= List of jazz fusion albums =

A list of jazz fusion albums:

== 1960s ==
- Gary Burton - Duster (1967)
- Blood, Sweat & Tears - Blood, Sweat & Tears (1968)
- Miles Davis - In a Silent Way (1969)
- The Tony Williams Lifetime - Emergency! (1969)
- Frank Zappa - Hot Rats (1969)
- Chicago - The Chicago Transit Authority (1969)

== 1970s ==
- Miles Davis - Bitches Brew (1970), A Tribute to Jack Johnson (1971), On the Corner (1972), Get Up With It (1974), Dark Magus (1974),Agharta (1975), Pangaea (1975)
- Dreams - Dreams (1970)
- Chicago - Chicago (1970)
- Nucleus - Elastic Rock (1970), We'll Talk About It Later (1971)
- Larry Coryell - Spaces (1970), Larry Coryell at the Village Gate (1971)
- The Tony Williams Lifetime - Turn It Over (1970)
- Jimmy Smith - Root Down (1972)
- Billy Cobham - Spectrum (1973)
- The New Tony Williams Lifetime - Believe It (1975), Million Dollar Legs (1976)
- Alphonse Mouzon - Mind Transplant (1975), Virtue (1976), In Search of a Dream (1978)
- Soft Machine - Third (1970), Fourth (1971), Six (1973), Seven (1973), Bundles (1975), Softs (1976)
- National Health - National Health (1977), Of Queues and Cures (1978)
- Mahavishnu Orchestra - The Inner Mounting Flame (1971), Birds of Fire (1972), Between Nothingness and Eternity (1973), The Lost Trident Sessions (1973), Apocalypse (1974), Visions of the Emerald Beyond (1975)
- John McLaughlin - My Goal's Beyond (1971), Love Devotion Surrender (1973)
- Herbie Hancock - Crossings (1972), Head Hunters (1973), Thrust (1974)
- Frank Zappa - Waka/Jawaka (1972), The Grand Wazoo (1972), Sleep Dirt (1979)
- Matching Mole - Matching Mole (1972)
- Weather Report - Weather Report (1971), I Sing the Body Electric (1972), Sweetnighter (1973), Mysterious Traveller (1974), Tale Spinnin' (1975), Black Market (1976), Heavy Weather (1977), Mr. Gone (1978), 8:30 (1979)
- Return to Forever - Light as a Feather (1973), Hymn of the Seventh Galaxy (1973), Where Have I Known You Before (1974), Romantic Warrior (1976), Musicmagic (1977)
- Santana - Caravanserai (1972)
- Oregon - Distant Hills (1973), Winter Light (1974)
- Jeff Beck - Blow by Blow (1975), Wired (1976)
- David Sancious - Forest Of Feelings (1975)
- Lenny White - Venusian Summer (1975)
- Gilgamesh - Gilgamesh (1975)
- Jaco Pastorius - Jaco Pastorius (1976)
- Brand X - Unorthodox Behaviour (1976), Moroccan Roll (1977)
- Al Di Meola - Land of the Midnight Sun (1976), Elegant Gypsy (1977), Casino (1978)
- Stanley Clarke - Stanley Clarke (1974), School Days (1976)
- Chick Corea - The Leprechaun (1976), My Spanish Heart (1976)
- Ralph MacDonald - Counterpoint (1977)
- Gong - Gazeuse! (1977), Expresso II (1978)
- Jean-Luc Ponty - Imaginary Voyage (1976),Enigmatic Ocean (1977), Cosmic Messenger (1978)
- Brecker Brothers - Heavy Metal Be-Bop (1978)
- Ronnie Montrose - Open Fire (1978)
- Bruford - One Of A Kind (1979)
- Pat Metheny - Pat Metheny Group (1978), American Garage (1979)
- Friendship - Friendship (1979)

== 1980s ==
- Weather Report - Night Passage (1980), Weather Report (1982), Procession (1983), Domino Theory (1984), Sportin' Life (1985)
- Brecker Brothers - Detente (1980), Straphangin' (1981)
- Herbie Hancock - Mr. Hands (1980)
- Steps Ahead - Smokin' In The Pit (by Steps) (1980), Steps Ahead (1983), Magnetic (1986), Live In Tokyo 1986 (1994)
- Frank Zappa - Shut Up 'n Play Yer Guitar (1981)
- Miles Davis - We Want Miles (1982)
- Vital Information - Vital Information (1983)
- Yellowjackets - Mirage a Trois (1983)
- Allan Holdsworth - Road Games (1983), Metal Fatigue (1985), Atavachron (1986), Sand (1987), Secrets (1989)
- Wayne Shorter - Atlantis (1985), Joy Ryder (1988)
- Bill Connors - Step It (1985)
- Don Grolnick - Hearts and Numbers (1985)
- Mike Stern - Upside Downside (1986)
- Chick Corea - Chick Corea Elektric Band (1986), Eye of the Beholder (1988)
- Scott Henderson & Tribal Tech - Dr. Hee (1987)
- John Scofield - Blue Matter (1987), Loud Jazz (1988)
- Bob Berg - Short Stories (1987), Cycles (1988)
- Uzeb - Noisy nights (1988)
- Casiopea - Eyes of the Mind (1981)

== 1990s ==
- Chick Corea Elektric Band - Inside Out (1990)
- Jack DeJohnette - DeJohnette, Holland, Hancock, Metheny In Concert (1990 - DVD Only)
- Frank Zappa - Make A Jazz Noise Here (1991)
- Chad Wackerman - Forty Reasons (1991)
- Tribal Tech - Tribal Tech (1991), Illicit (1992), Face First (1993), Reality Check (1995), Thick (1999)
- Allan Holdsworth - Wardenclyffe Tower (1992), Hard Hat Area (1993), None Too Soon (1996)
- Bill Evans - Petite Blonde (1992)
- Shawn Lane - Powers of Ten (1992)
- Cynic - Focus (1993)
- Tom Coster - The Forbidden Zone (1994)
- Metro - Metro (1994)
- Wayne Krantz - 2 Drink Minimum (1995)
- Alain Caron - Rhythm 'n Jazz (1995)
- Mike Stern - Between The Lines (1996), Give and Take (1997)
- Pat Metheny Group - Imaginary Day (1997)
- Jonas Hellborg - Time Is the Enemy (1997)
- Steve Smith - Vital Tech Tones (1998)
- Derek Sherinian - Planet X (1999)
- Dave Weckl Band - Synergy (1999)

== 2000s ==
- Allan Holdsworth - The Sixteen Men of Tain (2000)
- Tribal Tech - Rocket Science (2000)
- Metalwood - Recline (2001)
- Derek Sherinian - Inertia (2001), Black Utopia (2003), Mythology (2004), Blood of the Snake (2006)
- CAB - CAB 2 (2001), CAB 4 (2003)
- Lindsey Boullt - Composition album (2007)
- Scott Henderson - Well to the Bone (2002), Live! (2005)
- Planet X - MoonBabies (2002), Quantum (2007)
- Christian McBride - Vertical Vision (2003)
- Alain Caron - 5 (2003)
- Garaj Mahal - Mondo Garaj (2003)
- Hiromi Uehara - Another Mind (2003), Brain (2004), Spiral (2006), Hiromi's Sonicbloom - Time Control (2007)
- Vital Information - Come On In (2004)
- Chick Corea Elektric Band - To the Stars (2004)
- Guthrie Govan - Erotic Cakes (2006)
- Karcius - Kaleidoscope (2006)
- Shawn Lane - The Tri-Tone Fascination (2001)
- Karizma - Document (2000)
- Scott Kinsey - Kinsethetics (2006)
- Metro - Express (2007)
- Allan Holdsworth, Alan Pasqua, Jimmy Haslip, Chad Wackerman - Blues for Tony (2009)

== 2010s ==
- Mike Prigodich - A Stitch In Time (CD) (2011)

== 2020s ==
- Paul Mercury - Quantum Entanglement (2020), The Family (2020)

== See also ==
- List of jazz albums
