= Live! (Scott Henderson album) =

Live album by Scott Henderson
- Released: 2005
- Recorded: 2004
- Genre: Blues, Fusion
- Length: 96:10 (2CDs)
- Label: Tone Center
- Producer: Scott Henderson & Mike Varney

Scott Henderson chronology
Well to the Bone (2002)	Live! (2005)

Professional ratings
Review scores
Source	Rating
Allmusic	4/5 stars

Live! is a 2005 live album by fusion / jazz guitarist Scott Henderson. It's a double-CD, recorded at the La Vee club in Los Angeles, mixed by Michael Landau. The album features live-versions of songs from Henderson's previous solo-releases and songs by his fusion-band Tribal Tech.

== Track listing ==
CD1:

1. "Slidin'" – 7:27
2. "Well To The Bone" – 4:08
3. "Sultan's Boogie" – 7:26
4. "Xanax" – 6:25
5. "Lady P" – 7:55
6. "Jakarta" – 7:26
7. "Tacos Are Good" – 5:38

CD2:

1. "Dog Party" – 9:20
2. "Fee Fi Fo Fum" – 8:58
3. "Meter Maid" – 4:52
4. "Nairobe Express" – 12:27
5. "Devil Boy" – 7:51
6. "Hillbilly In The Band" – 6:17

== Personnel ==
- Scott Henderson - Guitars
- Kirk Covington - Drums and vocals
- John Humphrey - Bass
