= Face First (Tribal Tech album) =

Studio album by Tribal Tech
- Released: July 20, 1993
- Recorded: April – May 1993
- Studios: Alpha Studios (Burbank, California); Cherokee Studios (Hollywood, California)
- Genre: Jazz fusion
- Length: 70:44
- Label: Zebra Records
- Producers: Scott Henderson; Gary Willis

Tribal Tech chronology
Illicit (1992)	Face First (1993)	Reality Check (1994)

Professional ratings
Review scores
Source	Rating
Allmusic	4/5 stars

Face First is the sixth album by jazz fusion band Tribal Tech. It was released in 1993. The album is more improvisational than the band's previous works, and features elements of funk, bop and blues. "Boat Gig" is the only track on the album that contains singing, with vocals by drummer Kirk Covington.

== Track listing ==
No.	Title	Writer(s)	Length
1.	"Face First"	Gary Willis	7:04
2.	"Canine"	Gary Willis	6:24
3.	"After Hours"	Scott Kinsey	7:23
4.	"Revenge Stew"	Scott Henderson	6:07
5.	"Salt Lick"	Scott Henderson	9:45
6.	"Uh... Yeah OK"	Tribal Tech	6:44
7.	"The Crawling Horror"	Scott Henderson	7:44
8.	"Boiler Room"	Kirk Covington	1:35
9.	"Boat Gig"	Scott Henderson	6:00
10.	"The Precipice"	Gary Willis	6:17
11.	"Wounded"	Gary Willis	5:39

== Personnel ==
Tribal Tech

- Scott Kinsey – keyboards, backing vocals (9)
- Scott Henderson – guitars, backing vocals (9)
- Gary Willis – bass, backing vocals (9)
- Kirk Covington – drums, vocals (9)

With:

- Dana Sue Collins – backing vocals (9)
- Brett Garsed – backing vocals (9)
- Cheryl Graul – backing vocals (9)

=== Production ===
- George Nauful – executive producer
- Jim Snowden – executive producer
- Scott Henderson – producer
- Gary Willis – producer
- T.J. Helmerich – engineer, mixing
- John Radzin – assistant engineer
- Wayne Steiner – assistant engineer
- Steve Hall – mastering at Future Disc (Hollywood, California)
- Michelle Laurençot – art direction, design
- Jeffrey Weiss – photography
- Nathaniel Welch – photo of Kirk Covington and Scott Kinsey
- K.C. Nichols for K.C. Communications – management
