= X (Tribal Tech album) =

Studio album by Tribal Tech
- Released: 26 March 2012
- Genre: Jazz fusion
- Length: 58:20
- Label: Tone Center
- Producers: Mike Varney; Scott Henderson; Gary Willis; Scott Kinsey

Tribal Tech chronology
Rocket Science (2000)	X (2012)

Professional ratings
Review scores
Source	Rating
All About Jazz	(very favorable)

X is the final album by the fusion jazz band Tribal Tech released 26 March 2012.

== Track listing ==
All compositions are from Tribal Tech.

1. "Mech X" – 4:52
2. "Got Faith 'N Phat" – 7:10
3. "Time Lapse" – 7:38
4. "Anthem" – 5:28
5. "Palm Moon Plaza" – 7:35
6. "Gravity" – 3:40
7. "Working Blue" – 7:01
8. "Ask Me A Question" – 5:24
9. "Let's Get Swung" – 5:07
10. "Corn Butter" – 4:25

== Personnel ==
=== Musicians ===
- Scott Henderson - guitar
- Gary Willis - bass
- Scott Kinsey - keyboards
- Kirk Covington - drums

=== Other credits ===
- Scott Kinsey - engineer, mastering, mixing
- Bret Linford - artwork
- Tony Masterantonio - cover art
- Mr. Suzuki - spoken word
- Steve Tavaglione - photography
- Masaki Toriawa - spoken word
