= Tore Down House =

Studio album by Scott Henderson
- Released: 1997
- Recorded: August 1996
- Studios: Ham Studios (Hollywood, California)
- Genres: Blues; Fusion
- Length: 63:51
- Label: Mesa Records
- Producers: Scott Henderson; Scott Kinsey

Scott Henderson chronology
Dog Party (1994)	Tore Down House (1997)	Well to the Bone (2002)

Professional ratings
Review scores
Source	Rating
AllMusic	4.5/5 stars

Tore Down House is an album by the guitarist Scott Henderson, released in 1997. The album contains three instrumental tracks; it includes a cover version of "Continuum", originally a Jaco Pastorius song, and a re-recording of "Same as You", which appeared on Henderson's Dog Party. Thelma Houston sings on "Meter Maid", among other songs.

== Critical reception ==
Stereo Review wrote that "wailing harp, percolating organ and punchy horns make a perfect foil for Scott's scalding, raunchy Strat tones." The Sydney Morning Herald thought that "what really makes this album work ... is Thelma Houston's wonderfully rich, gutsy vocals—a pleasant surprise."

== Track listing ==
All compositions by Scott Henderson, except "Continuum" written by Jaco Pastorius.

1. "Dolemite" – 5:52
2. "Tore Down House" – 7:37
3. "Meter Maid" – 4:29
4. "I Hate You" – 4:38
5. "Gittar School" – 5:10
6. "Xanax" – 5:38
7. "Continuum" – 4:00
8. "You Get Off On Me" – 3:53
9. "Mocha" – 7:29
10. "Harpoon" – 6:46
11. "Same as You" – 4:36

== Personnel ==
- Scott Henderson – guitars
- Scott Kinsey – keyboards
- Dave Carpenter – bass
- Kirk Covington – drums
- Pat O'Brien – harmonica
- Albert Wing – alto saxophone, tenor saxophone, flute, Fearless Horn Section leader
- Mike Nelson – baritone saxophone, tenor saxophone
- Eric Jorgenson – trombone
- Dan Fornero – trumpet, flugelhorn
- Walt Fowler – trumpet, flugelhorn
- Thelma Houston – vocals
- Masta Edwards – vocals on "I Hate You"
- T.J. Helmerich – backing vocals
- Mark Nonisa – backing vocals

== Production ==
- George Nauful – executive producer
- Jim Snowden – executive producer
- Scott Henderson – producer
- Scott Kinsey – producer
- T.J. Helmerich – engineer, mixing
- Steve Doahn – mix assistant, tracking assistant
- Pedro Sa-Chaves – mix assistant, tracking assistant
- Steve Hall – mastering at Future Disc (Hollywood, California)
- Richard Evans – art direction, design
- Daniel Ray – photography
