= Kinesthetics (album) =

Studio album by Scott Kinsey
- Released: October 17, 2006
- Recorded: February 11 & 12, 2004; December 22, 2004
- Genre: Jazz fusion
- Length: 67:08
- Label: Abstract Logix
- Producer: Scott Kinsey

Kinesthetics is a studio album by keyboardist Scott Kinsey, released in 2006. It features contributions from Tribal Tech bandmates Scott Henderson, Gary Willis, and Kirk Covington, as well as Vinnie Colaiuta, Michael Landau, and Steve Tavaglione. Jazz Rock World called Kinesthetics "the best jazz rock fusion CD in the last ten years".

Professional ratings
Review scores
Source	Rating
The Penguin Guide to Jazz Recordings	3/4 stars

== Track listing ==
All tracks are written by Scott Kinsey, except where noted.

1. "Kinesthetics" – 7:41
2. "This Is That" – 4:56
3. "Sometimes I..." (Steve Tavaglione) – 5:02
4. "The Combat Zone" – 8:13
5. "Quartet" – 5:36
6. "Wishing Tree" (Kinsey, Tavaglione) – 4:16
7. "Big Rock" – 4:42
8. "Uncle Pats Gypsy Van" – 5:10
9. "Under Radar (Intro)" (Kirk Covington, Kinsey) – 1:16
10. "Under Radar" – 5:48
11. "Shinjuku" – 5:33
12. "One for Jinshi" – 8:52

== Personnel ==
- Scott Kinsey – keyboards, acoustic piano, Yamaha VP-1, melodica, vocoder
- Scott Henderson – guitars (4, 11)
- Jinshi Ozaki – guitars (4)
- Michael Landau – guitars (12)
- Paul Shihadeh – bass (1, 12)
- Gary Willis – bass (2)
- Abraham Laboriel – bass (3, 10)
- Jimmy Earl – bass (4, 11)
- Robert Hurst – bass (5)
- Armand Sabal-Lecco – bass (7, 10)
- Kirk Covington – drums (1–3, 7–12)
- Cyril Atef – drums (3, 4, 8)
- Vinnie Colaiuta – drums (5)
- Ronald Bruner, Jr. – drums (11)
- Brad Dutz – percussion (1, 4, 7, 9, 10)
- Alex Acuña – percussion (2)
- Arto Tunçboyacıyan – percussion (2)
- Satnam Ramgotra – percussion (10)
- Steve Tavaglione – soprano saxophone, tenor saxophone, alto flute, C flute, bass clarinet, clarinet, EWI
- Walt Fowler – trumpet (3)
- Tim Hagans – trumpet (4, 12)

== Production ==
- Joachim Becker – executive producer
- Souvik Dutta – executive producer
- Joe Zawinul – executive producer
- Scott Kinsey – producer, arrangements, mixing, mastering, recording (1–5, 7, 9–11)
- Art Kinsey – recording (6), excerpts recording (8, 12), acoustic piano recording (9)
- David Weaver – piano technician
- Cheryl Graul – photography
- Powa – cover art
