= Illicit (album) =

Studio album by Tribal Tech
- Released: 4 August 1992
- Recorded: April 1992
- Studios: Cherokee Studios (Hollywood, California); Ground Control Studios (Burbank, California)
- Genre: Jazz fusion
- Length: 63:41
- Labels: Bluemoon Recordings; Mesa Records
- Producers: Scott Henderson; Gary Willis; Peter Kelsey

Tribal Tech chronology
Tribal Tech (1991)	Illicit (1992)	Face First (1993)

Professional ratings
Review scores
Source	Rating
Allmusic	4/5 stars

Illicit is an album by the fusion jazz band Tribal Tech released in 1992. The album was recorded during the L.A. Riots in April 1992 at Cherokee Studios, Hollywood, California.

== Track listing ==
1. "The Big Wave" (Gary Willis) – 6:31
2. "Stoopid" (Gary Willis) – 5:47
3. "Black Cherry" (Scott Henderson) – 6:42
4. "Torque" (Scott Henderson) – 6:02
5. "Slidin' Into Charlisa (Scott Henderson) – 7:32
6. "Root Food" (Scott Henderson) – 8:13
7. "Riot" (Tribal Tech) – 6:58
8. "Paha-Sapa" (Gary Willis) – 3:24
9. "Babylon" (Gary Willis) – 5:26
10. "Aftermath" (Tribal Tech) – 7:03

== Personnel ==
Tribal Tech

- Scott Kinsey – keyboards
- Scott Henderson – guitars
- Gary Willis – bass
- Kirk Covington – drums

=== Production ===
- George Nauful – executive producer
- Jim Snowden – executive producer
- Scott Henderson – producer
- Gary Willis – producer
- Peter Kelsey – co-producer, engineer, mixing
- Jimmy Busceme – assistant engineer
- T.J. Helmerich – guitar engineer
- Tom Baker – mastering at Future Disc (Hollywood, California)
- Michelle Laurençot – art direction
- Thom Thompson – cover concept
- Nathaniel Welch – photography
- K.C. Nichols for K.C. Communications – management

== "The Big Wave" ==
(Gubbio, Italy, March 1993) Scott Henderson, during the child-like intro of "The Big Wave":

"This is a tune that Willis wrote, it's..uhh...kinda about the situation in Los Angeles as far as the music scene, has anybody ever been there? Los Angeles people? You're not missing anything believe me.. All the jazz there sounds exactly like this. It's very happy and pleasant....So we hate it! So we're gonna play a tune dedicated to the situation and the Los Angeles jazz scene."
