= Dog Party =

Studio album by Scott Henderson
- Released: 1994
- Recorded: February 1994
- Studios: Studio Sound Recorders (North Hollywood, California); The Convent (Beverly Hills, California)
- Genres: Jazz fusion, blues, rock
- Length: 56:51
- Label: Bluemoon/Mesa
- Producer: Scott Henderson

Scott Henderson chronology
Reality Check (1994)	Dog Party (1994)	Tore Down House (1997)

Dog Party is an album by guitarist Scott Henderson. A departure from his jazz fusion style, the album explores blues and blues rock, with songs that have something to do with dogs.

== Reception ==
Professional ratings
Review scores
Source	Rating
AllMusic	4/5 stars

AllMusic gave the album a positive review, praising "Milk Bone", "Hound Dog", and "Hole Diggin'", concluding that the album is "a feast of stylish blues served with grace and feeling."

== Track listing ==
All tracks are written by Scott Henderson, except "Hound Dog".

No.	Title	Length
1.	"Hole Diggin'"	4:19
2.	"Fence Climbin' Blues"	6:54
3.	"Dog Party"	6:42
4.	"Same as You"	5:09
5.	"Milk Bone"	5:40
6.	"Hell Bent Pup"	5:20
7.	"Hound Dog"	4:03
8.	"Dog Walk"	5:09
9.	"Smelly Ol' Dog Blues"	7:55
10.	"Too Many Gittars"	4:38

== Personnel ==
- Scott Henderson – guitars, fourth guitar solo (10)
- Scott Kinsey – keyboards
- Willie Scoggins – first guitar solo (10)
- Steve Trovato – second guitar solo (10)
- Keith Wyatt – third guitar solo (10)
- T. J. Helmerich – fifth guitar solo (10)
- Richard Ruse – bass
- Kirk Covington – drums, vocals
- Mike Whitman – saxophone
- Stan Martin – trumpet
- Pat O'Brien – harmonica
- Linda Zegarelli – harmonica (4)
- Erin McGuire – vocals (4)

== Production ==
- George Nauful – executive producer
- Jim Snowden – executive producer
- Scott Henderson – producer
- T.J. Helmerich – engineer, mixing
- Tim Anderson – mix assistant, tracking assistant
- Bradley Cook – overdub assistant
- Eddy Schreyer – mastering at Future Disc (Hollywood, California)
- Michelle Laurençot – art direction, hand tinting
- Lori Stoll – photography
