= Spears (album) =

Studio album by Tribal Tech
- Released: August 10, 1985
- Recorded: June 1985
- Studios: Studio Sound (North Hollywood, California)
- Genre: Fusion
- Length: 44:00
- Label: Passport
- Producer: Scott Henderson

Tribal Tech chronology
Spears (1985)	Dr. Hee (1987)

Professional ratings
Review scores
Source	Rating
Allmusic	3/5 stars

Spears is the 1985 debut album by fusion band Tribal Tech, a project led by guitarist Scott Henderson and bassist Gary Willis.

== Track listing ==
- All songs written by Scott Henderson, except "Tribal" by Scott Henderson and Gary Willis.
1. "Caribbean" – 8:13
2. "Punkin Head" – 6:10
3. "Ivy Towers" – 4:49
4. "Tribal" – 2:12
5. "Spears" – 7:10
6. "Island City Shuttle" – 7:28
7. "Big Fun" – 7:58

== Personnel ==
- Scott Henderson – guitars
- Pat Coil – keyboards
- Gary Willis – bass
- Steve Houghton – drums
- Brad Dutz – percussion, mallets
- Bob Sheppard – saxophones, flute

== Production ==
- Brad Dutz – executive producer
- Scott Henderson – producer, arrangements
- Gary Willis – co-arrangements (4)
- Alan R. Hirschberg – engineer
- John Guggenheim – assistant engineer
- Steve Hall – mastering at Future Disc (Hollywood, California)
- Jim Snowden – project coordinator
- Lindah K. Laudenbaugh – art direction, design
- Mark Sokol – cover photography
- All songs published by Mango Prom Music
