= Well to the Bone =

Well To The Bone

Studio album by Scott Henderson
- Released: September 3, 2002
- Recorded: 2002
- Studios: Tommy Tedesco Studio at Musicians Institute (Hollywood, California)
- Genres: Blues, fusion
- Length: 64:52
- Label: Shrapnel
- Producer: Scott Henderson

Scott Henderson chronology
Tore Down House (1997)	Well To The Bone (2002)	Live! (2005)

Professional ratings
Review scores
Source	Rating
Allmusic	4/5 stars

Well To The Bone is a 2002 album by fusion/jazz guitarist Scott Henderson. It is his third solo-album, again returning to his blues-roots. It features a re-recording of the Tribal Tech song "Rituals".

== Track listing ==
1. "Lady P" – 7:14
2. "Hillbilly in the Band" – 5:06
3. "Devil Boy" – 6:41
4. "Lola Fay" – 6:24
5. "Well to the Bone" – 4:50
6. "Ashes" – 6:53
7. "Sultan's Boogie" – 6:30
8. "Dat's Da Way It Go" – 6:54
9. "That Hurts" – 6:16
10. "Rituals" – 8:01

== Personnel ==
- Scott Henderson – guitars
- John Humphrey – bass
- Kirk Covington – drums
- Scott Kinsey – electronic percussion
- Wade Durham – vocals (1, 3, 8)
- Thelma Houston – vocals (4, 5, 8)

== Production ==
- Joachim Becker – executive producer
- Mike Varney – executive producer
- Scott Henderson – producer, mixing
- Michael Landau – mixing
- T.J. Helmerich – recording
- Chad Carrier – assistant engineer
- Oscar Donez – assistant engineer
- Mehdi Hassine – assistant engineer
- Cynthia Weckert – assistant engineer
- Doug Wingert – assistant engineer
- Greg Calbi – mastering at Sterling Sound (New York City, New York)
- Bob Design (Trier, Germany) – artwork
- Cheryl Graul – photography
- Dave Stephens – cover design, disc label design
