= Tom Kennedy (musician) =

American double-bass and electric bass player

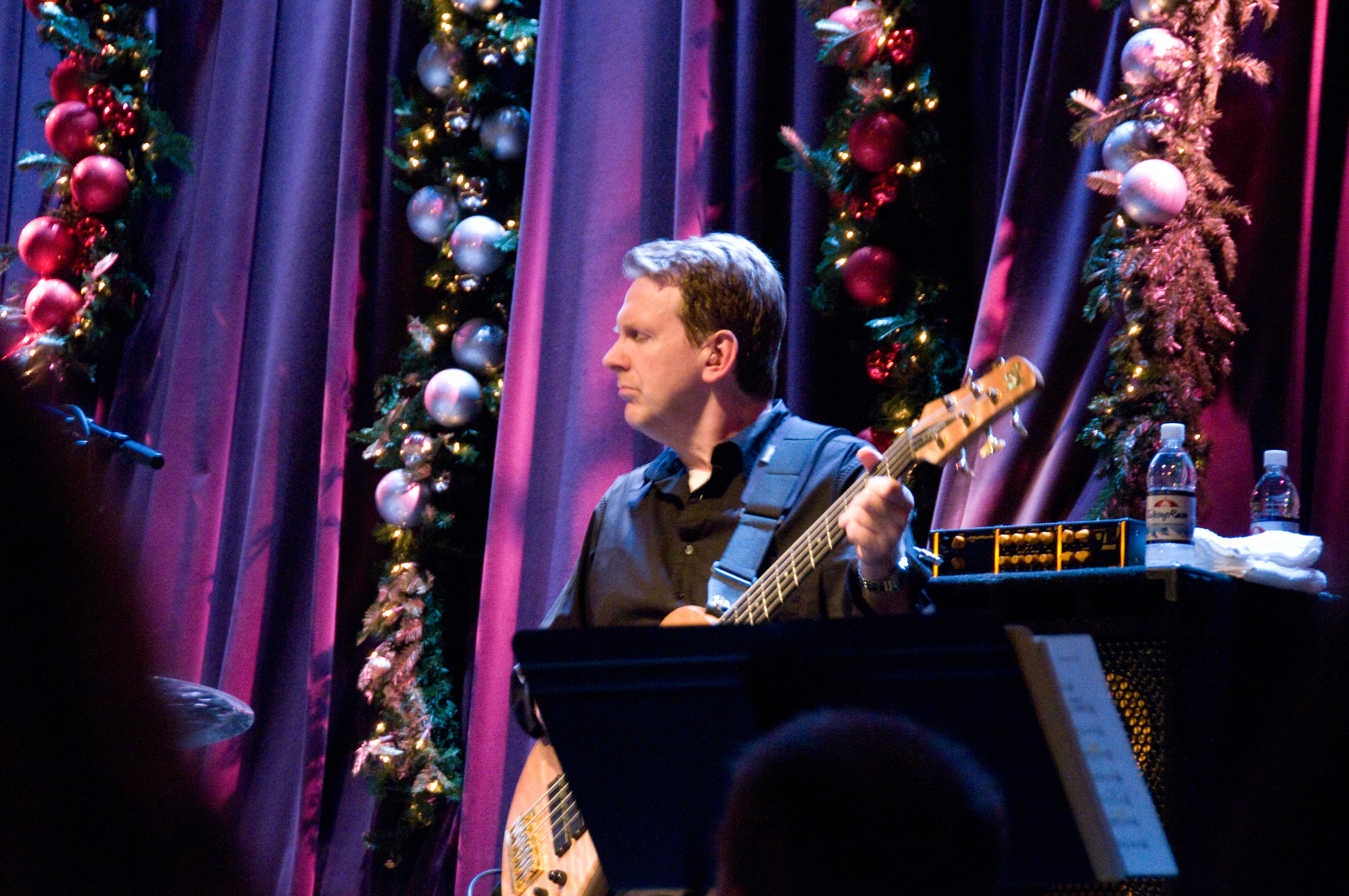
- Tom Kennedy

Background information
- Genres: Jazz, jazz fusion, swing
- Occupation: Musician
- Instrument: Bass
- Website: www.tomkennedymusic.com

Tom Kennedy is an American double-bass and electric bass player.

Tom Kennedy is the son of a professional trumpet player. He began playing acoustic bass at the age of nine on a double-bass brought home by his older brother, jazz pianist Ray Kennedy. Soon he began to perform with many nationally recognized artists passing through the Midwest.

Kennedy specialized in acoustic jazz until his introduction to the electric bass at the age of 17. Soon he was dividing his time between mainstream jazz and progressive jazz fusion. He moved to New York City in 1984.

== Select discography ==
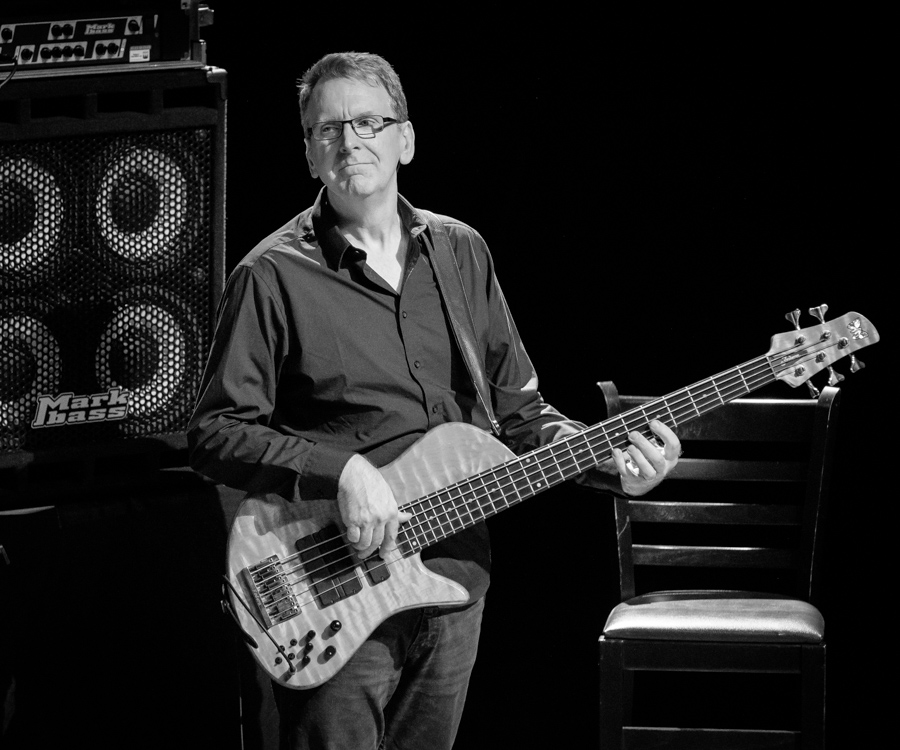
Tom Kennedy performing in 2018

=== As leader ===
- Basses Loaded (TKM, 1996)
- Bassics (Victoria, 2002)
- Just for the Record (CD Baby, 2012)
- Just Play! (Capri, 2013)
- Points of View (TKM, 2017)
- Stories (Autumn Hill 2021)
- New Start (Autumn Hill, 2024)
- The Summit (Autumn Hill, 2026)

=== As sideman ===
With Dave Weckl

- Master Plan (1990)

With Dave Weckl Band

- Rhythm of the Soul (1998)
- Synergy (1999)
- Transition (2000)
- The Zone (2001)
- Perpetual Motion (2002)
- Live (And Very Plugged In) (2003)
- Multiplicity (2005)
- Live in St. Louis at the Chesterfield Jazz Festival 2019 (2021)

With Bill Connors

- Step It (1984)
- Double Up (1986)
- Assembler (1987)

With others

- Hearts and Numbers by Don Grolnick
- I'll Remember April with Ray Kennedy
- The Infinite Desire by Al Di Meola
- Universe by Planet X
- Moonbabies by Planet X
- Inertia by Derek Sherinian
- All Over the Place by Mike Stern
- Mike Stern Band: New Morning – The Paris Concert (DVD)
