= Thick (album) =

Studio album by Tribal Tech
- Released: March 16, 1999
- Genres: Jazz fusion, free improvisation, space rock
- Label: Zebra Records

Tribal Tech chronology
Reality Check (1994)	Thick (1999)	Rocket Science (2000)

Professional ratings
Review scores
Source	Rating
Allmusic	4.5/5 stars
All About Jazz	(favorable)

Thick is an album by the fusion jazz band Tribal Tech released in 1999. As a contrast to Tribal Tech's previous recordings, the album features less compositional material and is based largely on improvisation.

== Track listing ==
All tracks composed by Scott Henderson, Gary Willis, Scott Kinsey and Kirk Covington.

1. "Sheik of Encino" – 6:50
2. "Party at Kinsey's" – 3:56
3. "Jalapeño" – 5:42
4. "Clinic Troll" – 3:43
5. "Thick" – 11:15
6. "You May Remember Me" – 4:45
7. "Slick" – 5:14
8. "Somewhat Later" – 2:46
9. "What Has He Had?" – 6:52

== Personnel ==
- Scott Henderson - guitar
- Gary Willis - bass
- Scott Kinsey - keyboards
- Kirk Covington - drums
