= Vital Tech Tones =

The Vital Tech Tones were a fusion trio composed of Vital Information drummer Steve Smith, Tribal Tech guitarist Scott Henderson, and Béla Fleck and the Flecktones bassist Victor Wooten. Their eponymous album was released by Tone Center in 1998. VTT2 followed in 2000. The band did not play concerts.

== Discography ==
- Vital Tech Tones (1998)
- VTT2 (2000)
