= Tribal Tech (album) =

Studio album by Tribal Tech
- Released: April 23, 1991
- Recorded: November – December 1990
- Studios: Castle Oaks Studios (Calabasas, California); Rumbo Recorders (Canoga Park, California); Ground Control Studios (Burbank, California)
- Genre: Jazz fusion
- Length: 1:05:29
- Label: Relativity Records
- Producers: Scott Henderson; Gary Willis; Peter Kelsey

Tribal Tech chronology
Nomad (1989)	Tribal Tech (1991)	Illicit (1992)

Professional ratings
Review scores
Source	Rating
Allmusic	4/5 stars
DownBeat	4.5/5 stars

Tribal Tech is the fourth album by the jazz fusion band Tribal Tech, released in 1991.

== Reception ==
DownBeat gave the album 4.5 stars. Reviewer Bill Milkowski wrote, "Henderson remains one of the strongest, most distinctive legato stylists among solid-body electric guitarists, ranking right up there with Allan Holdsworth. And his toe-curling licks on "Big Girl Blues" cut deep with Albert King intensity. This album confirms Henderson’s place at the top of the fusion heap, both as a player and as a composer".

== Track listing ==
1. "Signal Path" (Scott Henderson) – 6:26
2. "Big Girl Blues" (Scott Henderson) – 6:15
3. "Dense Dance" (Gary Willis, Scott Henderson) – 4:51
4. "Got Tuh B" (Gary Willis, Scott Henderson) – 6:43
5. "Peru" (Scott Henderson) – 7:23
6. "Elvis At The Hop" (Scott Henderson) – 4:34
7. "The Necessary Blonde" (Gary Willis, Scott Henderson) – 6:52
8. "Fight The Giant" (David Goldblatt) – 4:05
9. "Sub Aqua" (Scott Henderson) – 5:30
10. "Formula One" (Scott Henderson) – 4:44
11. "Wasteland" (Gary Willis) – 8:03

== Personnel ==
Tribal Tech

- David Goldblatt – keyboards
- Scott Henderson – guitars, guitar synthesizer
- Gary Willis – bass, synthesizers
- Joey Heredia – drums
- Brad Dutz – percussion

=== Production ===
- Scott Henderson – producer
- Gary Willis – producer
- Peter Kelsey – co-producer, engineer, mixing
- Mike Aarvold – assistant engineer
- Frank Salazar – assistant engineer
- Andy Udoff – assistant engineer
- Jeff Vaughn – assistant engineer
- Bernie Grundman – mastering at Bernie Grundman Mastering (Hollywood, California)
- David Bett – art direction
- Lori Stoll – photography
- Bill Detro Management – management
