= Scott Kinsey =

American keyboardist

- Kinsey in 2010

Background information
- Born: United States
- Genre: Jazz fusion
- Occupations: Musician; record producer
- Instrument: Keyboard
- Years active: 1980s–present
- Labels: Abstract Logix; Kinesthetic Music; Blue Canoe; Whirlwind; Heartcore
- Member of: Tribal Tech
- Education: Berklee College of Music
- Website: www.scottkinseymusic.com

Scott Kinsey is an American jazz-fusion keyboardist and member of the band Tribal Tech.

== Biography ==
Kinsey attended the Berklee College of Music in Boston. After graduating in 1991, he moved to Los Angeles and joined Tribal Tech that year, becoming part of the band's lineup with guitarist Scott Henderson, bassist Gary Willis, and drummer Kirk Covington. He recorded and toured with the group for approximately two decades, recording with them Illicit (1992), Face First (1993), Reality Check (1995), Thick (1999), Rocket Science (2000), and the reunion album X (2012).

Through Henderson, who had been a member of The Zawinul Syndicate in the 1980s – a group formed by Joe Zawinul following his Weather Report – Kinsey became interested in Zawinul's work.

Other musicians with whom Kinsey has collaborated with include Kurt Rosenwinkel, Philip Bailey, the WDR Big Band, Tim Hagans, and Bob Belden.

Kinsey has produced albums by Philip Bailey (Soul On Jazz), Joe Zawinul (Faces and Places), Tim Hagans (Imagination Animation and ReAnimation), Tribal Tech (TTX, Reality Check, Thick, Rocket Science), Scott Henderson (Dog Party, Tore Down House), Gary Willis (Bent), and James Moody (Homage).

Kinsey has also worked on film scores, contributing to the soundtracks of Ocean's Eleven and Analyze That, music composed by David Holmes, as well as Ocean's Twelve, Ocean's Thirteen, Code 46, Stander, Confessions of a Dangerous Mind, and Brown Sugar.

Kinsey was a protégé of Joe Zawinul, the executive producer of the European version of Kinsey's first album, Kinesthetics.

Together with his partner Mer Sal, Kinsey recorded the album Adjustments (2021).

== Discography ==
=== As leader/co-leader ===
- 2006: Kinesthetics (Abstract Logix)
- 2016: Near Life Experience (Abstract Logix)
- 2017: No Sleep (Kinesthetic Music)
- 2018: Arc Trio (Blue Canoe)
- 2019: We Speak Luniwaz (Whirlwind)
- 2019: Do It 1992 (Heartcore)[limited edition] – recorded in 1992; with Kurt Rosenwinkel
- 2021: Adjustments (Blue Canoe) – with Mer Sal
- 2024: Luniwaz Live – The Music of Joe Zawinul (Whirlwind) – live

=== As a member ===
Human Element
(With Arto Tunçboyacıyan, Gary Novak, Matt Garrison, and Ranjit Barot)

- Human Element (Abstract Logix, 2010)

Tribal Tech
(With Scott Henderson, Gary Willis, and Kirk Covington)

- Illicit (Bluemoon, 1992)
- Face First (Bluemoon, 1993)
- Reality Check (Mesa/Bluemoon, 1995)
- Thick (Cream, 1999)
- Rocket Science (ESC, 2000)
- X (Tone Center, 2012)

Uncle Moe's Space Ranch
(With Brett Garsed, Dennis Chambers, Gary Willis, and T. J. Helmerich)

- Uncle's Moe's Space Ranch (Tone Center, 2001)
- Moe's Town (Tone Center, 2007)

=== As sideman ===
With Bob Belden

- Princejazz (Somethin' Else, 1994)
- Tapestry (Blue Note, 1997)
- Black Dahlia (Blue Note, 2001)

With Tim Hagans

- Animation/Imagination (Blue Note, 1999)
- Re-Animation Live! (Blue Note, 1999) with Bob Belden
- Future Miles (ACT, 2002)

With Scott Henderson

- Dog Party (Mesa, 1994)
- Tore Down House (Mesa/Bluemoon, 1997)
- Well to the Bone (ESC, 2002)

With Gary Willis

- No Sweat (Alchemy, 1996)
- Bent (Alchemy, 1998)
- Larger Than Life (Abstract Logix, 2015)

With others

- Philip Bailey, Soul on Jazz (Heads Up, 2002)
- Jeff Berlin, Taking Notes (Denon, 1997)
- Ranjit Barot, Bada Boom (EMI, 2010)
- Sandeep Chowta, Matters of the Heart (Sony, 2013)
- Jimmy Earl, Renewing Disguises (Severn, 2014)
- Jimmy Herring, Lifeboat (Abstract Logix, 2008)
- David Holmes, Presents the Free Association (13 Amp, 2003)
- Robert Hurst, Bob Ya Head (Bebob, 2010)
- Michael Landau, Live (Tone Center, 2006)
- The Manhattan Transfer, The Chick Corea Songbook (4Q, 2009)
- Kurt Rosenwinkel, The Enemies of Energy (Verve, 2000)
- Michael Waldrop, Origin Suite (Origin, 2018)
- Gianfranco Continenza, The Past Inside The Present (ESC, 2007)
