= Just Add Water =

Just Add Water may refer to:

== Music ==
- Just Add Water (Suga Free album), 2006
- Just Add Water (Virgil Donati album), 1997
- Just Add Water, an album by Bobby Previte, 2002
- Leaving the End Open (working title: Just Add Water), an album by Hardline, 2009
- "Just Add Water", a single by Dave Dobbyn, 2000.
- "Just Add Water", a single by Cavetown, 2018
- "Just Add Water", a single by Bass Extremes, 2001

== Other uses ==
- Just Add Water (company), a video game developer based in England
- Just Add Water (film), a 2008 comedy
- Just Add Water (improv troupe), a Yale University student organization
- JAW: A Playwrights Festival, previously Just Add Water/West, an annual event produced by Portland Center Stage

== See also ==
- H2O: Just Add Water, an Australian children's TV series
- Expandable water toy
