= Nomad (Tribal Tech album) =

Studio album by Tribal Tech
- Released: February 16, 1990
- Recorded: April 1988
- Studios: Studio Sound Recorders (North Hollywood, California); Smoketree Ranch (Chatsworth, California)
- Genre: Fusion
- Length: 52:21
- Label: Relativity Records
- Producers: Scott Henderson; Gary Willis

Tribal Tech chronology
| Dr. Hee (1987) | Nomad (1990) | Tribal Tech (1991) |

Professional ratings
Review scores
| Source | Rating |
|---|---|
| Allmusic | 4/5 stars |

Nomad is the third album by fusion band Tribal Tech, a project led by guitarist Scott Henderson and bassist Gary Willis. The album was recorded in April 1988, but not released until 1990.

== Delay of release ==
Although Nomad was recorded and mixed in 1988, its release was delayed by nearly two years because Tribal Tech's previous label Passport Records went bankrupt, and the group had to search for another label and buy back the rights of the album. By 1989, Tribal Tech had been signed to Relativity Records, and Nomad was planned for release that summer. However, the album was not officially released until early 1990.

On the album's delay, Henderson told Guitar World: "I actually had to buy back my own record from the bank. But before they allowed me to do that, they ran an investigation on me to find out if I was anybody important–if I was some kind of million-seller rock star or something. And when they finally realized that it was actually a jazz record, that it wasn't going to be worth mega-bucks to them, they agreed to sell it to me, which took a few more months to negotiate. Once I got possession of the album, I had to shop for a new deal, which took another seven months."

== Track listing ==
1. "Renegade" (Gary Willis) – 5:51
2. "Nomad" (Scott Henderson) – 7:18
3. "Robot Immigrants" (Brad Dutz, David Goldblatt) – 5:09
4. "Tunnel Vision" (Gary Willis) – 4:43
5. "Elegy For Shoe" (David Goldblatt) – 4:09
6. "Bofat" (Scott Henderson) – 8:34
7. "No No No" (Gary Willis) – 5:53
8. "Self Defense" (Gary Willis) – 5:00
9. "Rituals" (Scott Henderson) – 5:44

== Personnel ==
Tribal Tech

- David Goldblatt – keyboards
- Scott Henderson – guitars
- Gary Willis – bass
- Steve Houghton – drums
- Brad Dutz – mallets, percussion

=== Production ===
- Cliff Cultreri – executive producer
- Scott Henderson – producer
- Gary Willis – producer
- Alan Hirshberg – basic track engineer
- Peter Kelsey – mixing, overdub engineer
- John Kliner – assistant engineer
- Bernie Grundman – mastering at Bernie Grundman Mastering (Hollywood, California)
- David Bett – art direction
- Lindah K. Lauderbaugh – cover art
