= Rocket Science (Tribal Tech album) =

Studio album by Tribal Tech
- Released: November 7, 2000
- Genre: Jazz fusion
- Length: 59:06
- Label: ESC Records

Tribal Tech chronology
Thick (1999)	Rocket Science (2000)	X (2012)

Professional ratings
Review scores
Source	Rating
Allmusic	3/5 stars
All About Jazz	(favourable)

Rocket Science is the tenth album by the jazz fusion band Tribal Tech released in 2000. It is also the last album of the band before the 2011 comeback.

== Track listing ==
1. "Saturn 5" – 7:24
2. "Astro Chimp" – 3:21
3. "Song Holy Hall" – 4:59
4. "Rocket Science" – 9:14
5. "Sojlevska" – 4:04
6. "Mini Me" – 6:17
7. "Space Camel" – 5:28
8. "Moonshine" – 5:18
9. "Cap'n Kirk" – 3:01
10. "The Econoline" – 10:00

== Personnel ==
- Scott Henderson - guitar
- Gary Willis - bass
- Scott Kinsey - keyboards
- Kirk Covington - drums
