= Planet X (Derek Sherinian album) =

Studio album by Derek Sherinian
- Released: July 13, 1999
- Recorded: The Leopard Room in Hollywood Hills
- Genres: Instrumental rock, progressive rock, progressive metal, jazz fusion
- Length: 47:45
- Label: Magna Carta
- Producers: Derek Sherinian, Tom Fletcher

Derek Sherinian chronology
Planet X (1999)	Inertia (2001)

Planet X is the first studio album by keyboardist Derek Sherinian, released on July 13, 1999 through Magna Carta Records. The album was devised after Sherinian left progressive metal band Dream Theater in January 1999. He then joined drummer Virgil Donati in forming a band also named Planet X, which released their own first album Universe in 2000. Guitarist Brett Garsed, who plays on Planet X, would later return on the band Planet X's album Quantum in 2007.

== Critical reception ==
Professional ratings
Review scores
Source	Rating
All About Jazz	Favorable
AllMusic	3/5 stars

Glenn Astarita at All About Jazz gave Planet X a positive review, calling it "prog-rock heaven with a few fusion bites thrown in for good measure" and "A highly entertaining effort featuring some almost superhuman ensemble work". He praised the "strong compositional and arranging skills" of Sherinian and Donati, and the "crunching guitar work" of Garsed.

Steve Huey at AllMusic gave the album three stars out of five. He, too, praised each musician's performance, as well as likening the compositional influences to that of Steve Vai and King Crimson.

== Track listing ==
All music is composed by Derek Sherinian and Virgil Donati, except where noted.

No.	Title	Length
1.	"Atlantis: Part 1. "Apocalypse 1470 B.C.""	6:59
2.	"Atlantis: Part 2. "Sea of Antiquity""	4:18
3.	"Atlantis: Part 3. "Lost Island""	5:38
4.	"Crab Nebulae"	4:07
5.	"Box"	5:05
6.	"Money Shot"	4:26
7.	"Day in the Sun"	4:58
8.	"State of Delirium"	2:48
9.	"Space Martini"	3:47
10.	"Brunei Babylon" (Sherinian, Donati, Brett Garsed)	5:39
Total length:		47:45

== Personnel ==
- Derek Sherinian – keyboards, production
- Brett Garsed – guitar
- Virgil Donati – drums
- Tony Franklin – bass
- Tom Fletcher – engineering, mixing, production
