= Taste (Australian band) =

Australian rock band

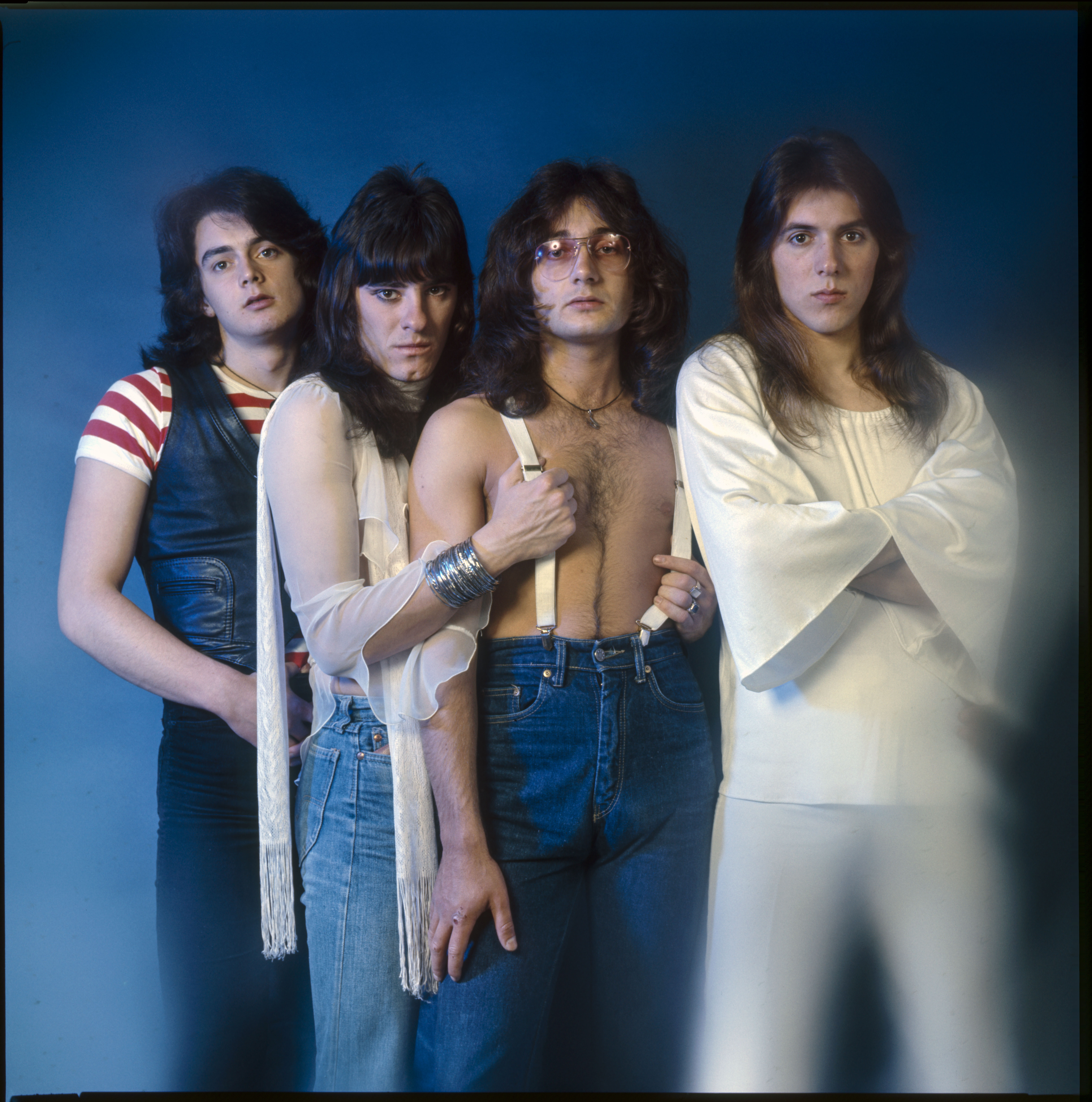
- Taste 1977 Virgil Donati, Ken Murdoch, Michael Tortoni, Joey Amenta

Background information
- Origin: Australia
- Genres: Pop rock, rock
- Years active: 1970–1978, 2005–present
- Labels: Warner Records, Bootleg, Phillips, Goset Music, Melodicrock Records
- Members: Ken Murdoch: Michael Tortoni; Joey Amenta; Damian Corniola
- Past members: Tony Farrimond: Virgil Donati

Taste were an Australian band, active in the 1970s, and was originally called Cloud Nine.

The band consisted of Ken Murdoch (guitars, vocals and keyboards), Michael Gemini (bass), Joey Amenta and Virgil Donati (drums).

In 1975, the group changed their name to Taste.

As Taste, the group released two studio albums which peaked inside the Australian top 20.

== Biography ==
=== 1970-1975: Cloud 9 ===
In 1970, Ken Murdoch and Michael Tortoni formed Cloud 9 (aka Cloud Nine) while still at high school. Cloud 9 issued a debut single on Warner Records, called "Say Goodbye" produced by Ian Molly Meldrum in 1973. In 1974, Virgil Donati and Tony Farrimond (vocals) joined and the band signed to RCA.

Cloud 9 released the album We're Just Good Friends… So Rock On and the singles "Summertime Blues" and "Take My Hand".

In 1975, Joey Amenta replaced Farrimond and the band changed their name to Taste. At the end of the year, the band signed to the Bootleg label.

=== 1976-1979: Taste ===
In June 1976, the band released "Tickle Your Fancy" / "Rock 'n' Roll Superstar", which peaked at number 18 on the Australian charts. Taste's debut album Tickle Your Fancy was released in July 1976 and peaked at number 19.The group's biggest hit came with "Boys Will Be Boys", which peaked at number 14 in January 1977. "A Little Romance" was followed by "Rebecca" proceeding the band's second album Knights of Love in September 1977.

=== 2005-present ===
The band re-formed in the mid 2000s and recorded album Rock is Dead.

Damian Corniola joined the group and together the group released Life On Earth.

In 2020, they released the EP Brothers Vol 1 which included "We All Stand Up" which garnered over 136 radio station add lists and the single "2020s Gone" which charted at No.6 in Madrid.

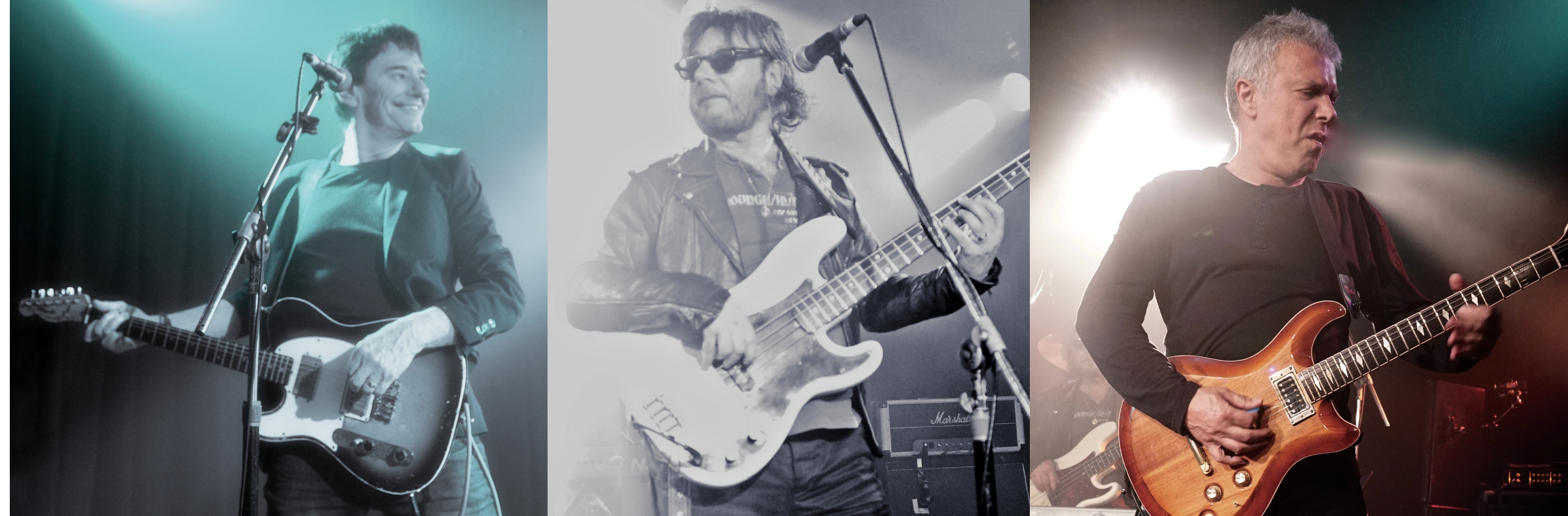
Taste 2018

== Discography ==
=== Albums ===
==== Studio albums ====
List of studio albums, with Australian positions
Title	Details	Peak chart positions
Title	Details	AUS
We're Just Good Friends… So Rock On (as Cloud Nine)	Released: 1975; Label: RCA (VPL1-0075); Formats: Cassette, LP	-
Tickle Your Fancy	Released: July 1976; Label: Bootleg (BLA 053); Formats: Cassette, LP	18
Knights of Love	Released: September 1977; Label: Philips (6357050); Formats: Cassette, LP	18
Rock is Dead	Released: 2007; Label: MelodicrockRecords; Formats: CD, download	-
Life On Earth	Released: 27 Mary 2016; Label: MelodicrockRecords; Formats: CD, download	-

==== Compilations ====
Title	Details
The Best of Taste	Released: 2015; Label: MR records; Formats: CD, download

=== Extended plays ===
Title	Details
Brothers Vol 1	Released: 17 December 2020; Label: Melodicrock Records (MRR109); Formats: CD, download, streaming

=== Singles ===
List of singles, with Australian chart positions
Year	Title	Peak chart positions	Album
Year	Title	AUS	Album
Credited as Cloud Nine
1973	"Say Goodbye"	-	
1975	"Summertime Blues"	-	We're Just Good Friends… So Rock On
1975	"Hi There"		We're Just Good Friends… So Rock On
Credited as Taste
1976	"Tickle Your Fancy"	49	Tickle Your Fancy
1976	"Degenerate Fool" / "Lone Rager"	-	Tickle Your Fancy
1976	"Boys Will Be Boys"	33	Knights of Love
1977	"A Little Romance"	53	Knights of Love
1977	"Rebecca"	92	Knights of Love
2016	"I Am God"	-	Life on Earth
2017	"Is It Just a Dream"	-	Life on Earth
2019	"Remedy"	-	
2020	"(We All) Stand Up"	-	Brothers Vol. 1
2020	"2020's Gone"	-	Brothers Vol. 1
