= Just Add Water (Virgil Donati album) =

Studio album by Virgil Donati
- Released: 1997
- Recorded: December 22, 1996
- Genre: Rock
- Length: 54:06
- Label: Vorticity
- Producers: Virgil Donati and T.J. Helmerich

Just Add Water is an instrumental album that was released by drummer Virgil Donati in 1997. Alongside Donati is Scott Henderson on guitar and Ric Fierabracci on bass. The entire album is a one-time-through, unrehearsed jam session that was recorded in the M.I. Studio in Hollywood on December 22, 1996. It was edited and produced by Donati and T.J. Helmerich, and released on Vorticity Records.

== Track listing ==
1. "The Arithmetic of Sin" – 2:28
2. "Concerning Female Beauty" - 9:09
3. "The Morals of Chess" - 1:49
4. "On Manners" - 11:56
5. "A Small Opening" - 2:50
6. "A Dispute" - 8:27
7. "Extremely Dirty" - 2:12
8. "How to Grow Great Women" - 7:13
