= Moving Forward =

Studio album by Bernie Williams
- Released: April 14, 2009
- Recorded: 2008–2009
- Genre: Jazz
- Label: Reform
- Producer: Loren Harriet, Bernie Williams

Bernie Williams chronology
The Journey Within (2003)	Moving Forward (2009)

Moving Forward is the second studio album by former New York Yankees outfielder turned jazz musician, Bernie Williams.

== Background ==
The album was released on April 14, 2009, through the independent label, Reform Records. Williams, who played lead and rhythm, composed nine of the 14 tracks on the album. Several well-known guests are featured on the album, including Bruce Springsteen, Dave Koz, and fellow athlete turned musician Wayman Tisdale.

Moving Forward made it on to five different Billboard charts, including 178 on the magazine's main chart, the Billboard 200, but it found its greatest success on the Top Contemporary Jazz chart, where it peaked at #2. In addition to the album, two singles also made it to the Billboard's Smooth Jazz Songs. "Go For It" made it to #1, while "Ritmo De Otono" peaked at #2.

== Reception ==
Professional ratings
Review scores
Source	Rating
Allmusic	4/5 stars

The album was met with positive reviews. Allmusic gave the album four out of a possible five stars, stating "while the four-time World Series champ's glory days are behind him as a ballplayer, he's Moving Forward towards a stellar career in music." Dave Sheinin from The Washington Post also gave the album a favorable review, stating that "if you can deal with some clichéd jazz-fusion production, there are some interesting songs, some virtuoso flourishes (many of them from Williams, whose talent as a guitarist is evident) and some cool moments".

The album received a nomination for Best Instrumental Album at the 10th Annual Latin Grammy Awards.

== Track listing ==
- All songs written by Bernie Williams, except where noted. Adapted from Allmusic.
1. "Moving Forward"- 5:22 (featuring Wayman Tisdale)
2. "Ritmo de Otoño"- 5:42 (featuring Dave Koz)
3. "Songo"- 5:02 (featuring Scott Henderson)
4. "Addicted to You"- 5:57
5. "Just Another Day"- 5:18 (featuring Jon Secada) (Secada, Miguel Morejon)
6. "He Reigns"- 5:53
7. "Lullaby for Beatriz"- 3:53
8. "Go for It"- 6:55 (featuring Mike Stern)
9. "Que Rico el Mambo"- 7:26 (Perez Prado)
10. "African Blues"- 5:16
11. "Chillin in the West"- 5:05
12. "Take Me Out to the Ball Game"- 3:02 (featuring Bob Sheppard) (Jack Norworth, Albert Tizer)
13. "Otro Dia Mas Sin Verte"- 5:19 (featuring Jon Secada) (Secada, Morejon)
14. "Glory Days"- 6:24 (featuring Bruce Springsteen) (Bruce Springsteen)

== Chart history ==
Chart (2009)	Peak position
Billboard 200	178
Billboard Top Contemporary Jazz	2
Billboard Jazz Albums	3
Billboard Top Heatseekers	6
Billboard Top Independent Albums	23
