= John Humphrey (bass player) =

Canadian musician

John Michael Humphrey is a bass player who has toured with guitarist Scott Henderson since 1998, performing with drummer, Kirk Covington, as a trio. Together they recorded Well To The Bone in 2003. Humphrey has also been employed as a bass instructor at the Musicians Institute in Hollywood.

Humphrey and Scott Henderson previously performed together in Jean-Luc Ponty's band during their "Fables" world tour in 1986.

During the years of 1990 through 1995 Humphrey played bass for Carole King. He recorded with her on her 1992 album The Colour of Your Dreams, and with her 1994 In Concert, and he participated in the PBS video production Carole King, In Concert.

Humphrey has previously toured as a member of the group Savoy Brown, recording with them on their 1981 albums Rock'n'Roll Warriors and Greatest Hits Live.

Humphrey has three brothers who are also professional musicians; actor Mark Humphrey plays the drums, Paul Humphrey plays keyboards and guitar, and Andy Humphrey is a guitarist. Paul and Andy are singer/songwriters as well.
