= Live from Oz =

Live album by Planet X
- Released: April 3, 2002
- Recorded: June 13, 2001
- Venue: The Corner Hotel (Richmond, Victoria)
- Genres: Instrumental rock, progressive metal
- Length: 72:56
- Label: Inside Out
- Producer: Planet X

Planet X chronology
Universe (2000)	Live from Oz (2002)	MoonBabies (2002)

Live from Oz is a live album by instrumental rock/progressive metal supergroup Planet X, released in 2002 through Inside Out Music.

== Critical reception ==
Professional ratings
Review scores
Source	Rating
AllMusic	3/5 stars

François Couture at AllMusic gave Live from Oz three stars out of five, saying that it "packs tons of energy" and praising each musician for their virtuosity.

== Track listing ==
No.	Title	Music	Length
1.	"Ignotus Per Ignotium"	Virgil Donati	7:46
2.	"Inside Black"	Donati, Tony MacAlpine, Derek Sherinian	5:16
3.	"Dog Boots"	Donati	3:55
4.	"Apocalypse 1470 B.C."	Donati, Sherinian	6:23
5.	"Sea of Antiquity"	Donati, Sherinian	4:20
6.	"Lost Island"	Donati, Sherinian	6:20
7.	"Derek Sherinian Solo"	Sherinian	2:41
8.	"Warfinger"	Donati, MacAlpine, Sherinian	4:36
9.	"Virgil Donati Solo"	Donati	4:00
10.	"Warfinger (Reprise)"	Donati, MacAlpine, Sherinian	1:51
11.	"Tony MacAlpine Solo"	MacAlpine	4:14
12.	"Her Animal"	Donati, MacAlpine, Sherinian	4:39
13.	"Europa"	Donati, MacAlpine, Sherinian	4:19
14.	"Pods of Trance"	Donati, MacAlpine, Sherinian	8:12
15.	Untitled ("Clonus")	Donati, MacAlpine, Sherinian	4:24
Total length:			72:56

== Personnel ==
- Tony MacAlpine – guitar, production
- Derek Sherinian – keyboard, production
- Virgil Donati – drums, production
- Dave LaRue – bass
- Albert Law – engineering
- Simon Phillips – mixing
- Brad Vance – mastering

== Release history ==
Region	Date	Label
Europe	April 3, 2002	Inside Out
North America	May 21, 2002	Inside Out
Japan	May 22, 2002	Inside Out
