= MoonBabies =

Studio album by Planet X
- Released: July 29, 2002
- Recorded: The Leopard Room and Coy Sound Studio Room in Hollywood Hills
- Genre: Instrumental rock, progressive rock, progressive metal, jazz fusion
- Length: 56:40
- Label: Inside Out
- Producer: Simon Phillips

Planet X chronology
| Live from Oz (2002) | MoonBabies (2002) | Quantum (2007) |

MoonBabies is the second studio album by instrumental rock/progressive metal supergroup Planet X, released in 2002 through Inside Out Music.

== Critical reception ==
Professional ratings
Review scores
| Source | Rating |
|---|---|
| All About Jazz | Favorable |
| AllMusic | 3/5 stars |

Glenn Astarita at All About Jazz gave MoonBabies a positive review, recommending it highly while praising the band's cohesiveness and each musician's technical craft. François Couture at AllMusic gave the album three stars out of five, remarking that "The music occasionally falls into the culprit of 'complex for complexity's sake'", but also saying it was "more varied and overall accomplished" than Planet X's 2000 debut album Universe. Guitarist Tony MacAlpine, in particular, was described as "a magician, often stealing the show with his inspired solos and soaring lead lines—recalling Allan Holdsworth in his prime."

== Track listing ==
| No. | Title | Music | Length |
|---|---|---|---|
| 1. | "MoonBabies" | Derek Sherinian, Virgil Donati | 5:39 |
| 2. | "The Noble Savage" | Donati, Tony MacAlpine, Sherinian | 6:14 |
| 3. | "Ataraxia" | Donati | 6:17 |
| 4. | "70 VIR" | MacAlpine, Donati | 4:02 |
| 5. | "Micronesia" | Donati | 5:56 |
| 6. | "Interlude in Milan" | Donati | 4:40 |
| 7. | "Digital Vertigo" | Donati, MacAlpine, Sherinian | 4:25 |
| 8. | "Ground Zero" | Donati | 6:03 |
| 9. | "Midnight Bell" | Donati | 3:56 |
| 10. | "Ignotus Per Ignotium" | Donati | 9:28 |
| Total length: | | | 56:40 |

== Personnel ==
- Tony MacAlpine – guitar
- Derek Sherinian – keyboard
- Virgil Donati – drums

Collaborators

- Tom Kennedy – bass (tracks 1, 4–6, 10)
- Billy Sheehan – bass (track 2)
- Jimmy Johnson – bass (tracks 3, 7–9)
- Simon Phillips – engineering, mixing, producer
- Albert Law – engineering
- Brad Vance – mastering

== Release history ==
| Region | Date | Label |
|---|---|---|
| Europe | July 29, 2002 | Inside Out |
| North America | August 13, 2002 | Inside Out |
| Japan | August 21, 2002 | Inside Out |
