= The Journey Within =

Studio album by Bernie Williams
- Released: July 15, 2003
- Recorded: Globe Studios (New York City)
- Genre: Jazz
- Label: GRP
- Producer: Lorren Harriet

Bernie Williams chronology
The Journey Within (2003)	Moving Forward (2009)

Professional ratings
Review scores
Source	Rating
AllMusic	4/5 stars
Entertainment Weekly	B
Rolling Stone	2/5 stars

The Journey Within is the debut album by Bernie Williams, who at the time of its release was still an outfielder for the New York Yankees. Released on July 15, 2003, by GRP Records, Williams played both lead and rhythm guitar on the album and composed seven of the album's songs. The album peaked at number 151 on the Billboard 200 and number 3 on the Top Contemporary Jazz albums chart.

== Marketing ==
The album's label, GRP, hoping to capitalize on Williams's popularity as a baseball player, released the album to coincide with the 2003 Major League Baseball All-Star Game. They also organized a Bernie Williams CD night at Yankee Stadium and distributed a sampler CD with proof of purchase of Kraft products.

== Track listing ==
1. "La Salsa en Mi" (Bernie Williams)-4:37
2. "The Way" (John DeNicola, Patti Maloney)-5:14
3. "Para Don Berna" (Bernie Williams)-3:23
4. "Desvelado" (Bernie Williams)-5:30
5. "Just Because" (Bernie Williams)-6:16
6. "Samba Novo" (Bernie Williams)-1:46
7. "Dust in the Wind" (Kerry Livgren)-3:28
8. "Stranded on the Bridge" (Bernie Williams)-4:43
9. "Bernie Jr." (Bernie Williams)-6:13
10. "Enter the Bond" (Bernie Williams)-5:03
11. "And So It Goes" (Billy Joel)-3:46
12. "Just Because" [Radio Mix] (Bernie Williams)-3:49
13. "The Williams Kids"-4:27

== Personnel ==
Credits adapted from album's liner notes.

=== Musicians ===
- Bernie Williams - lead guitar, rhythm guitar (1, 3–5, 8–10, 12), additional percussion (4, 10)
- Mike Alvarez - additional guitar (track 10)
- Kenny Aronoff - drums (tracks 1, 2, 5, 10, 12)
- David Benoit - additional piano (track 12)
- Rubén Blades - background vocals (track 1)
- Luis Conte - percussion (tracks 1, 2, 5, 12)
- Béla Fleck - banjo (tracks 1, 8)
- Jerry Hey - additional flugelhorn (track 12)
- Bashiri Johnson - percussion (tracks 3, 4, 8–10)
- B.J. Lequerica - background vocals (track 2)
- Shawn Pelton - drums (tracks 4, 8, 9)
- Tim Pierce - rhythm guitar (tracks 1, 2, 5, 7, 10, 12), lead guitar (10)
- Mark Rivera - saxophone (tracks 1, 2, 8, 9)
- David Sancious - keyboards (tracks 3, 4, 8, 9)
- Gilberto Santa Rosa - background vocals (track 1)
- Leland Sklar- bass (tracks 1, 2, 5, 10, 12)
- David Spinozza - rhythm guitar (tracks 3, 4, 8, 9)
- John Thomas - keyboards (tracks 1, 2, 5, 10, 12), piano and strings (11)
- Hiram Williams - cello (tracks 3, 7)
- Larry Williams - Fender rhodes (track 12)
- T-Bone Wolk - bass (tracks 4, 8, 9), acoustic bass (3)

=== Production ===
- Lorren Harriet - producer
- Tally Sherwood - engineer (tracks 1, 2, 5, 7, 10–12)
- Danny Bernini - engineer (tracks 3, 4, 6–11)
- Mike Alvarez - additional engineering (tracks 1, 4)
- Paul Brown - remixing
- Bud Harner - remixing
- Stephen Marcussen - mastering
- Hollis King - art direction
- LeRoy Neiman - paintings
- Jorge Alvarez - photography, back cover
- Kelly Pratt - release coordinator
- Robert Silverberg - release coordinator
- Bernie Williams - liner notes
- Paul McCartney - liner notes

== Charts ==
The Journey Within charted on several Billboard lists:

Chart (2003)	Peak position
US Billboard 200	157
US Top R&B/Hip-Hop Albums (Billboard)	72
US Top Contemporary Jazz Albums (Billboard)	3
US Heatseekers Albums (Billboard)	8
