= Dr. Hee =

Studio album by Tribal Tech
- Released: December 1, 1987
- Recorded: March – April 1987
- Studios: George Tobin Studios (North Hollywood, California)
- Genre: Fusion
- Length: 44:58
- Labels: Passport, Relativity Records
- Producers: Scott Henderson; Gary Willis

Tribal Tech chronology
Spears (1985)	Dr. Hee (1987)	Nomad (1990)

Professional ratings
Review scores
Source	Rating
Allmusic	4/5 stars

Dr. Hee is the second album by fusion band Tribal Tech, a project led by guitarist Scott Henderson and bassist Gary Willis.

== Track listing ==
1. "Dr. Hee" (Scott Henderson) – 6:52
2. "Outskirts" (Gary Willis) – 5:47
3. "Mango Prom" (Henderson) – 6:45
4. "Solemn" (Will Boulware) – 2:55
5. "Salsa Lastra" (Henderson) – 5:36
6. "Twilight In Northridge" (Henderson) – 5:19
7. "Seek And Find" (Boulware) – 4:52
8. "The Rain" (Henderson) – 1:46
9. "Ominous" (Willis) – 5:06

== Personnel ==
Tribal Tech

- Pat Coil – keyboards (1–3, 5), synthesizer programming (4, 7), acoustic piano (6)
- Scott Henderson – guitars (1–5, 7–9), acoustic guitar (6)
- Gary Willis – bass (1–7, 9), synthesizer programming (9)
- Steve Houghton – drums (1–7, 9)
- Brad Dutz – mallets (1–7, 9), percussion (1–7, 9), steel drums (8), bells (8)
- Bob Sheppard – saxophone (1–4, 7, 9), flute (2, 5), alto flute (6)

With:

- Will Boulware – keyboards (4, 7)

== Production ==
- Jim Snowden – executive producer
- Scott Henderson – producer
- Gary Willis – producer
- Alan Hirshberg – engineer
- John Kliner – assistant engineer
- Steve Hall – mastering at Future Disc (Hollywood, California)
- Lindah K. Laudenbaugh – art direction, design
- Randel Urbauer – cover photography
