= Universe (Planet X album) =

Studio album by Planet X
- Released: June 6, 2000
- Studio: The Leopard Room, Hollywood Hills
- Genre: Instrumental rock; progressive metal; jazz fusion
- Length: 56:16
- Label: Inside Out
- Producer: Planet X

Planet X chronology
Universe (2000)	Live from Oz (2002)

Universe is the first studio album by the instrumental rock/progressive metal band Planet X, released on June 6, 2000 through Inside Out Music. The album is essentially a continuation of keyboardist Derek Sherinian's 1999 debut solo release Planet X, but this time as a full band effort featuring guitarist Tony MacAlpine and drummer Virgil Donati.

== Critical reception ==
Professional ratings
Review scores
Source	Rating
All About Jazz	4/5 stars
AllMusic	4/5 stars

Glenn Astarita at All About Jazz gave Universe a positive review, recommending it for both "technically inclined prog-heads" and "those who feel that they've heard it all." He praised each musician for their technical prowess, but remarked that it was sometimes difficult to differentiate between MacAlpine's guitar and Sherinian's keyboard.

Robert Taylor at AllMusic gave Universe four stars out of five, saying that "Some of the selections tend to sound the same, but the inventive soloing of each player more than makes up it" and calling it "A fine effort by a very powerful trio".

== Track listing ==
All music is composed by Virgil Donati, Tony MacAlpine and Derek Sherinian, except where noted.

No.	Title	Length
1.	"Clonus"	4:15
2.	"Her Animal"	4:50
3.	"Dog Boots" (Donati)	3:36
4.	"Bitch" (Donati)	5:20
5.	"King of the Universe" (lyrics: Dick Smothers Jr.)	8:16
6.	"Inside Black"	5:12
7.	"Europa"	4:20
8.	"Warfinger"	5:38
9.	"Chocalate"	5:22
10.	"Pods of Trance"	4:48
11.	"2116"	4:39
Total length:		56:16

== Personnel ==
- Tony MacAlpine – guitar, production
- Derek Sherinian – keyboard, production
- Virgil Donati – drums, production
- Tom Kennedy – bass
- Dick Smothers Jr. – spoken vocals (track 5)
- Albert Law – engineering
- T. J. Helmerich – engineering
- Greg D'Angelo – engineering
- Tom Fletcher – mixing
- Gene Grimaldi – mastering
