= Bernie Williams =

Puerto Rican former professional baseball player and musician (born 1968)

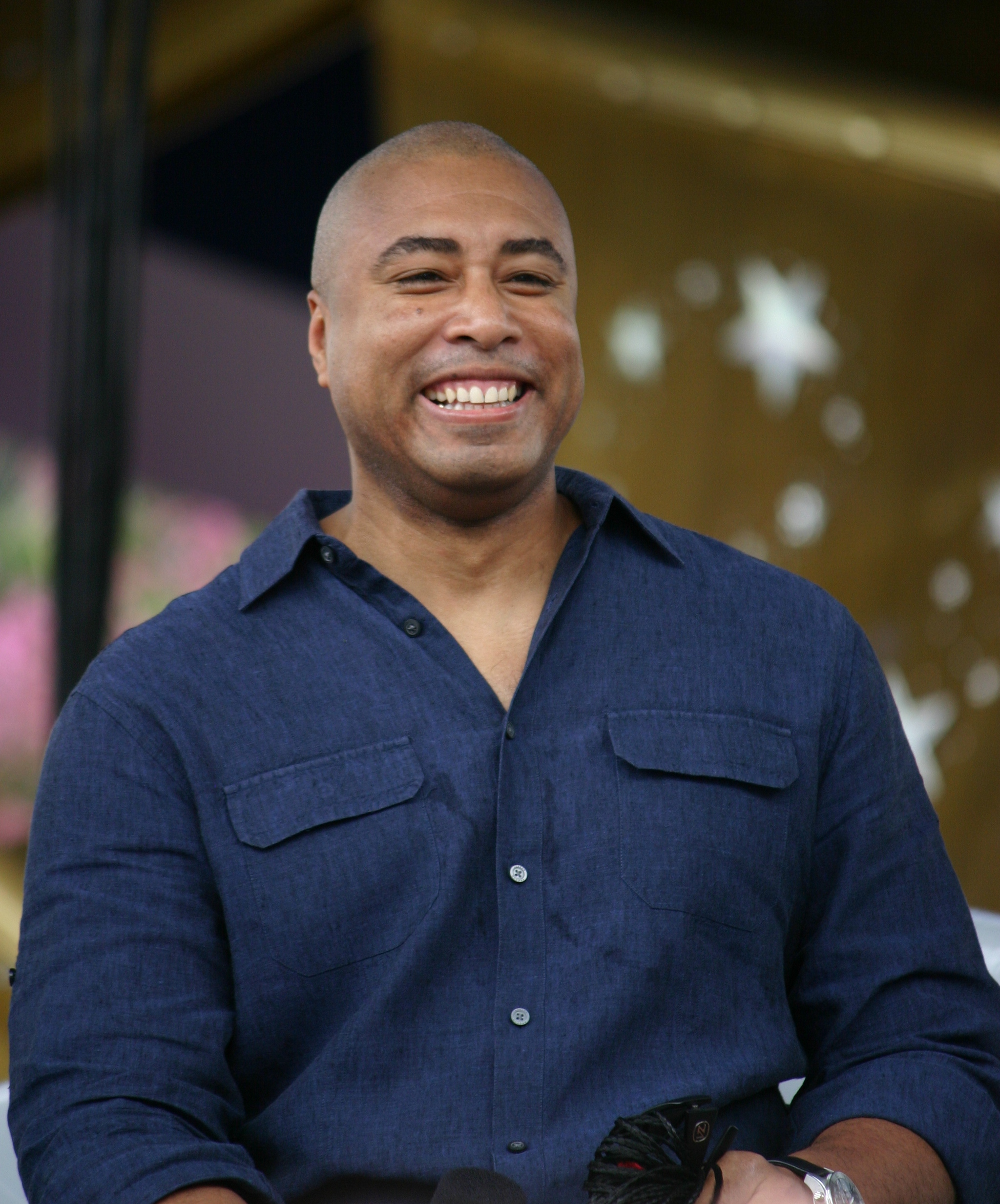
- Williams in 2011
- Center fielder
- Born: September 13, 1968 (age 58); San Juan, Puerto Rico
- Batted: Switch Threw: Right

MLB debut
- July 7, 1991, for the New York Yankees

Last MLB appearance
- October 1, 2006, for the New York Yankees

MLB statistics
- Batting average: .297
- Hits: 2,336
- Home runs: 287
- Runs batted in: 1,257
- Stats at Baseball Reference

Teams
- New York Yankees (1991–2006)

Career highlights and awards
- 5× All-Star (1997–2001); 4× World Series champion (1996, 1998–2000); ALCS MVP (1996); 4× Gold Glove Award (1997–2000); Silver Slugger Award (2002); AL batting champion (1998); New York Yankees No. 51 retired; Monument Park honoree
Medals
Athletics
Representing Puerto Rico
CAC Junior Championships (U20)
Silver medal – second place	1984 San Juan	4 × 100 m relay
CAC Junior Championships (U17)
Gold medal – first place	1984 San Juan	200 m
Gold medal – first place	1984 San Juan	400 m
Gold medal – first place	1984 San Juan	4 × 100 m relay
Gold medal – first place	1984 San Juan	4 × 400 m relay

Bernabé Williams Figueroa Jr. (born September 13, 1968) is a Puerto Rican former professional baseball player and current musician. He played his entire 16-year career in Major League Baseball (MLB) with the New York Yankees from 1991 through 2006.

A center fielder, Williams was a member of four World Series championship teams with the Yankees. He ended his career with a .297 batting average, 287 home runs, 1,257 runs batted in (RBI), 1,366 runs scored, 449 doubles, and a .990 fielding percentage. He was a five-time All-Star and won four Gold Glove Awards, a Silver Slugger Award, the American League (AL) batting title in 1998, and the 1996 AL Championship Series Most Valuable Player Award. Known for his consistency and postseason heroics, Williams is one of the most beloved Yankees. The team honored him by retiring his uniform number 51 and dedicating a plaque to him in Monument Park in May 2015. Williams is widely considered one of the greatest switch-hitting center fielders in the sport's history.

Williams is also a classically trained guitarist. Following his retirement from baseball, he has released two jazz albums. He was nominated for a Latin Grammy in 2009.

== Early life ==
Bernabé Williams Figueroa Jr. was born on September 13, 1968, in San Juan, Puerto Rico, to Bernabé Williams Sr., a merchant marine and dispatcher, and Rufina Figueroa, a retired principal and college professor. The Williams family lived in the Bronx until Bernie was one year old, when they moved to Puerto Rico.

Growing up, Williams played classical guitar as well as baseball. He was also active in track and field, winning medals at an international meet at the age of 15. At the 1984 Central American and Caribbean Junior Championships in Athletics in San Juan, Puerto Rico, Williams won gold in the 200 metres (m), 400 m, 4 × 100 m relay, and 4 × 400 m relay events for competitors under the age of 17, and the silver medal for the 4 × 100 m relay among competitors younger than 20.

== Achievements in track and field ==
Year	Competition	Venue	Position	Event	Notes
Representing Puerto Rico
1984	Central American and Caribbean Junior	San Juan, Puerto Rico	2nd	4 × 100 m relay	41.51
1984	Central American and Caribbean Junior Championships (U-17)	San Juan, Puerto Rico	1st	200 m	21.99 w
1984	Central American and Caribbean Junior Championships (U-17)	San Juan, Puerto Rico	1st	400 m	49.29
1984	Central American and Caribbean Junior Championships (U-17)	San Juan, Puerto Rico	1st	4 × 100 m relay	42.89
1984	Central American and Caribbean Junior Championships (U-17)	San Juan, Puerto Rico	1st	4 × 400 m relay	3:22.78

== Professional career ==
=== Minor leagues ===
In 1985, Roberto Rivera, a scout for the New York Yankees of Major League Baseball (MLB), discovered Williams and Williams' friend, Juan González. Though Rivera was not interested in González, who he perceived as not taking the game seriously, he wanted to sign Williams. However, Williams was a few months shy of his 17th birthday, when he would become eligible to sign with an MLB team. The Yankees put Williams in a training camp in Connecticut, near the home of scouting director Doug Melvin, who later had González on his Texas Rangers teams. After playing a few games in the Greater Hartford Twilight Baseball League on the Katz Sports Shop team, Williams was officially signed by the Yankees on his 17th birthday.

While playing in Minor League Baseball, Williams took a course on biology at the University of Puerto Rico, and considered undertaking a pre-medical track as an undergraduate student. Deciding that he could not excel at baseball and medicine at the same time, Williams decided to focus on baseball. Playing for Double-A Albany-Colonie Yankees, he continued to develop his athletic skills – particularly as a switch hitter. Although viewed as a great prospect by Yankee management, his rise to the majors was delayed by the solid outfield — Roberto Kelly, Danny Tartabull, and Jesse Barfield — that the team had developed in the early 1990s.

=== New York Yankees (1991–2006) ===
Williams managed to break into the majors in 1991 to replace the injured Roberto Kelly for the second half of that season. He batted .238 in 320 at bats. He was demoted to the minors until Danny Tartabull was injured, and Williams earned his stay at center by putting up solid numbers.

Williams had become the regular Yankees center fielder by 1993. However, Williams got off to a slow start that season, and Yankees' owner George Steinbrenner, impatient with Williams, insisted that Gene Michael, the team's general manager, trade him. Michael discussed trading Williams for Larry Walker with the Montreal Expos, but did not make the trade. In his first full season with the Yankees, Williams had a .268 batting average.

Throughout the early 1990s, Williams hit in the middle of the order as management tried to figure out where his best fit was.

==== 1995–1998 ====
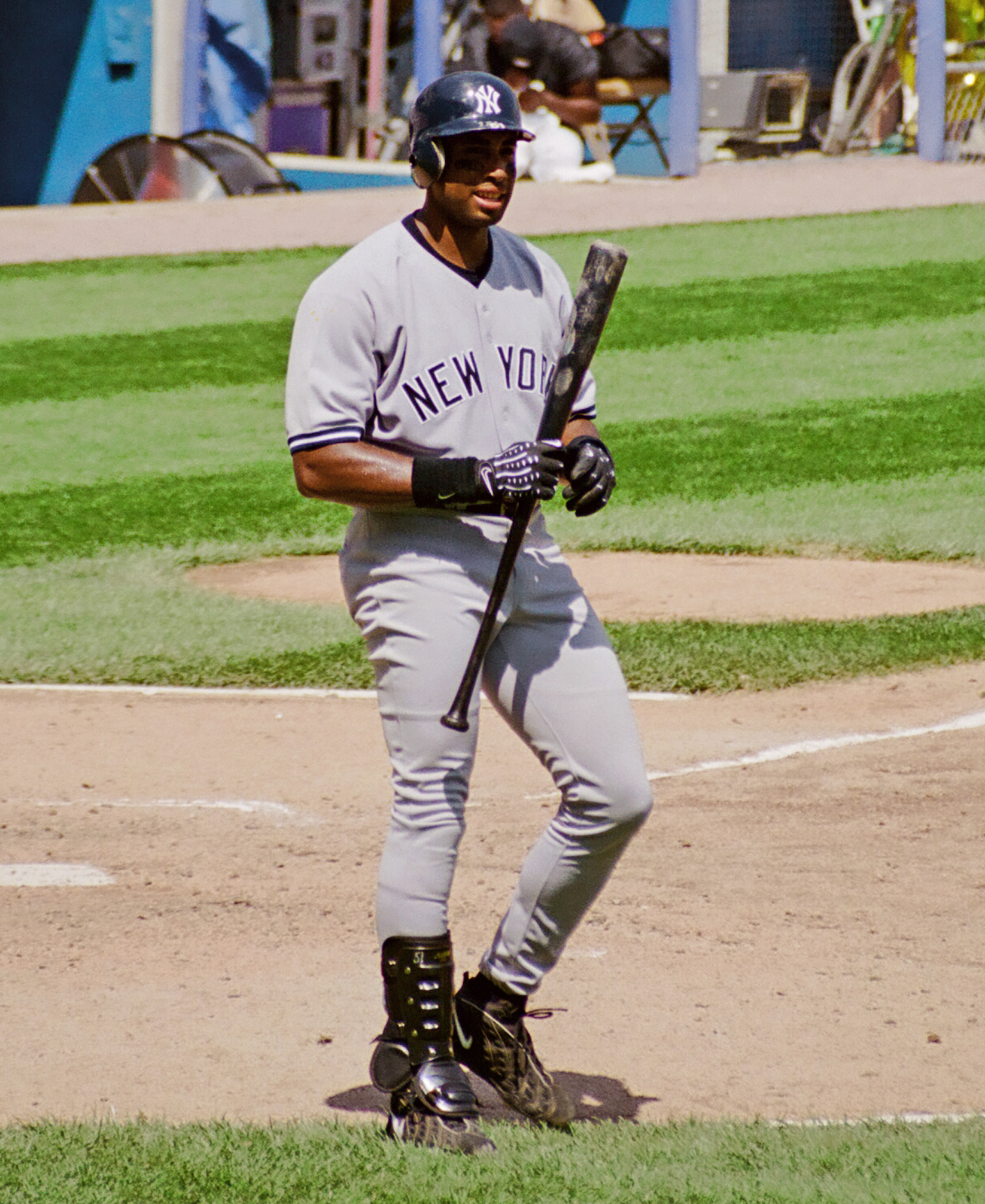
Williams in 1999

Manager Buck Showalter helped keep Williams with the Yankees through 1995, when Steinbrenner became frustrated by the team's difficulty in placing Williams in any of the traditional baseball player molds. He had good speed, but rarely stole bases. In center, he was highly capable at tracking down fly balls and line drives, but had a weak throwing arm. He was a consistent hitter but only had mild home run power.

In 1995, Steinbrenner again considered trading Williams, this time to the San Francisco Giants for Darren Lewis. The Yankees kept Williams, who went on to have a breakout season. He hit 18 home runs and led the team in runs, hits, total bases and stolen bases. Williams continued his hot hitting into the postseason, leading the Yankees with a .429 batting average in the 1995 American League Division Series (ALDS) against the Seattle Mariners.

After continuing to improve in 1996, Williams again showcased his skills to the baseball world in the postseason. He batted .467 in the ALDS against Texas and played a sparkling center field. He picked up where he left off in the ALCS against Baltimore, belting an 11th-inning walk-off homer in Game 1. Ending the ALCS with a .474 batting average and two homers, he was named the ALCS MVP. While Williams collected just four hits in the 1996 World Series, his clutch homer in the eighth inning of Game 3 helped spark the team's comeback from a 2–0 series deficit to capture the team's first championship since 1978.

Despite his success, following the 1997 season, Williams again was the subject of trade rumors, this time involving the Detroit Tigers. According to The New York Times sportswriter Murray Chass, Williams was nearly dealt to the Tigers for a package of young pitchers including Roberto Durán and first round draft pick Mike Drumright. Tigers general manager Randy Smith believed a deal had been reached and an official announcement was close, but Yankees general manager Bob Watson denied that was the case, and Williams remained a Yankee. Watson also discussed Williams with the Chicago Cubs in a potential trade involving Lance Johnson.

During the 1998 season, in which the Yankees went 114–48 to set a then-American League regular-season record, Williams finished with a .339 average, becoming the first player to win a batting title, Gold Glove award, and World Series ring in the same year. He finished seventh in American League Most Valuable Player voting.

==== 1999–2004 ====
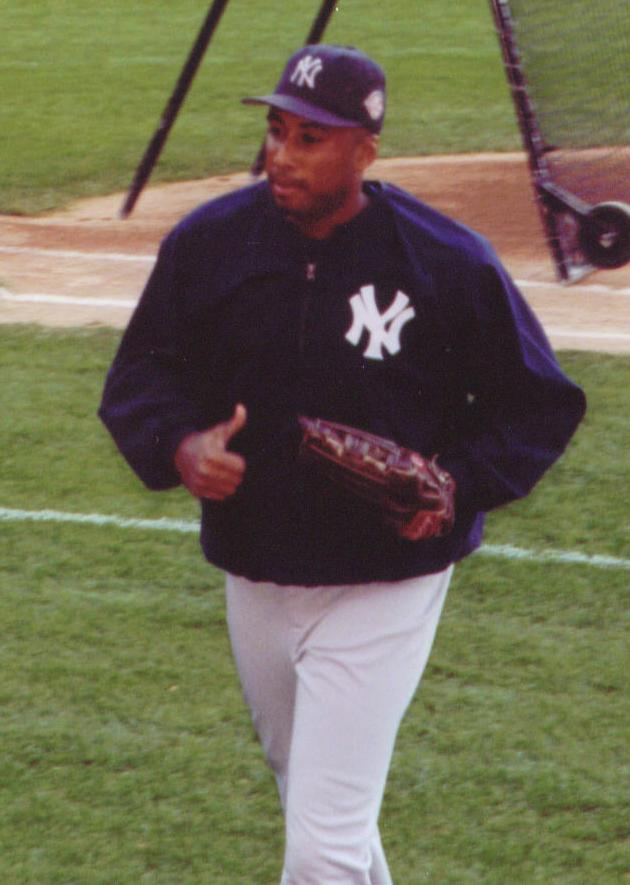
Williams in 2004

After the 1998 season, Williams signed a seven-year, $87.5-million contract with the Yankees, one of the largest in baseball at the time. The Boston Red Sox and Arizona Diamondbacks also bid for Williams on the free agent market. For the length of the contract, the Yankees made the playoffs every single year, and as a result Williams continued to add to his postseason statistics. He currently places in the top 5 of career postseason categories such as hits, runs scored, doubles, home runs, walks, and runs batted in, where he ranks first.

In 1999, Williams recorded 200+ hits for the first time in his career and won his third straight Gold Glove Award. He also finished third in the American League in batting average (.342), third in hits (202), fourth in on-base percentage (.435), fifth in bases on balls (100), and seventh in runs scored (116). In the following season, he once again won a Gold Glove Award and set career highs with 30 home runs and 121 runs batted in.

In 2001, Williams made his final All-Star team, maintaining a batting average above .300 for the seventh consecutive season. In 2002, Williams won the only Silver Slugger Award of his career, as he hit .333 and recorded a career-high 204 base hits. He finished tenth in American League Most Valuable Player voting.

The 2003 and 2004 seasons saw diminished production from Williams. In 2003, he tore his meniscus and missed a significant amount of time. Against the Florida Marlins in the 2003 World Series, Williams put up his best World Series performance, hitting .400 with two home runs. Williams finished the season with a .263 batting average and 15 home runs in 119 games played. The following season Williams hit 20 home runs and a .262 batting average.

==== 2005 ====
The last year covered by Williams’ contract, 2005, proved to be a difficult one. He started just 99 games in center field and 22 games as designated hitter, and his already weak arm was more noticeable as his fielding and batting abilities deteriorated. He had a career-worst .321 OBP and batting average on balls in play (.274). As expected, the Yankees announced on August 2, 2005, that they would not pick up the $15 million option on Williams' contract for the 2006 season, opting to pay a $3.5 million buyout instead. In December, Williams was offered arbitration by team general manager Brian Cashman to allow an additional month for negotiation. On December 22, the Yankees re-signed Williams to a 1-year, $1.5 million contract.

==== 2006 ====
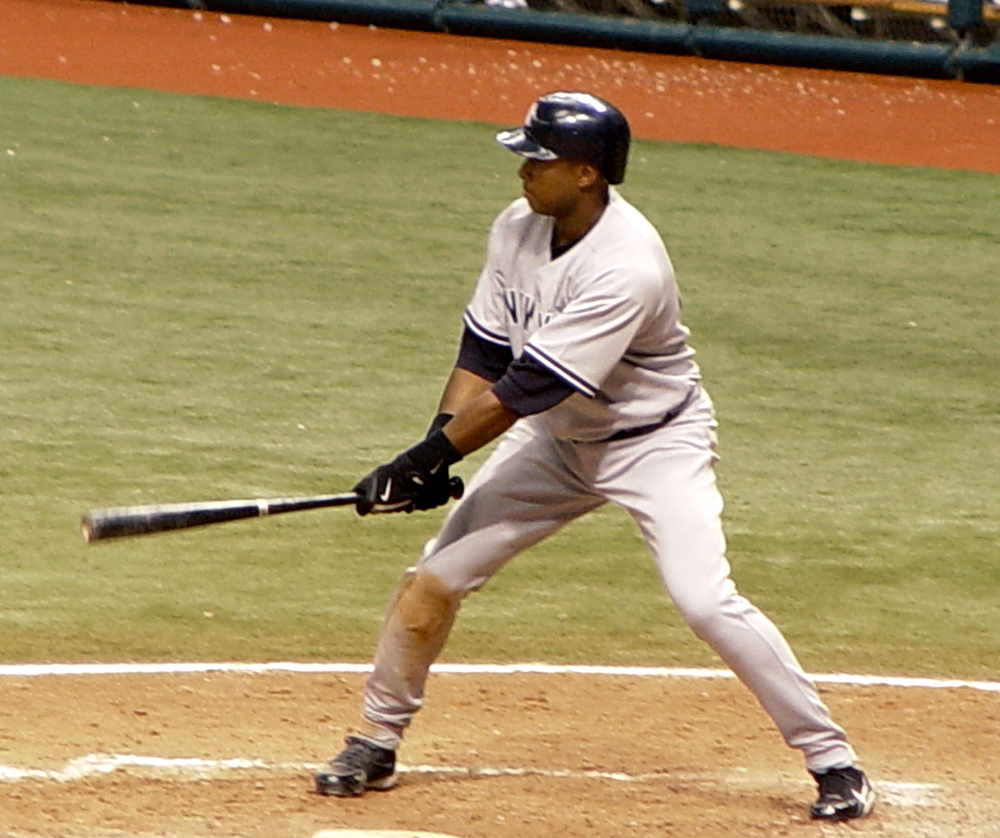
Bernie Williams at bat.

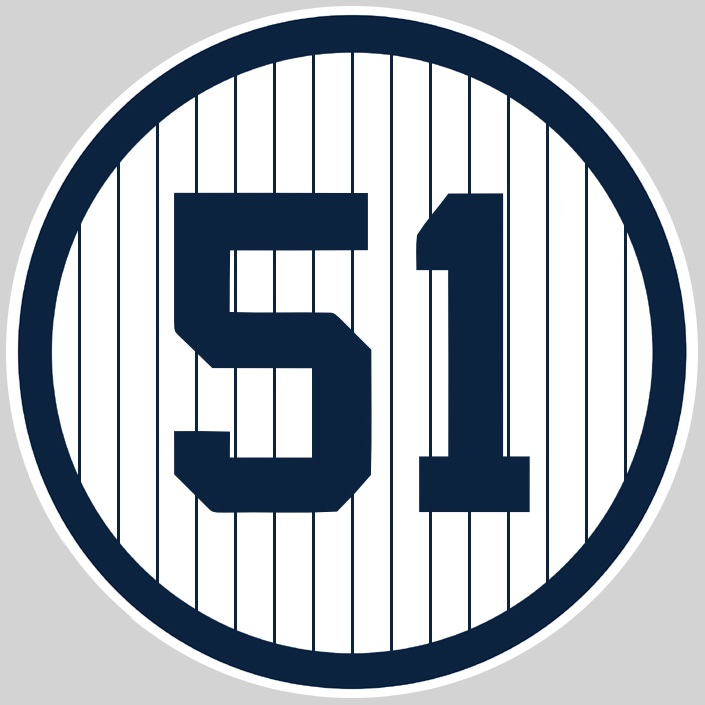
Bernie Williams's number 51 was retired by the New York Yankees in 2015.

In 2006, Williams saw a good amount of playing time in the corner outfield spots with both Hideki Matsui and Gary Sheffield out with wrist injuries, and did spot duty in center field on days when starting center fielder Johnny Damon was given time off to rest, playing more than was expected when he signed his one-year extension with the Yankees in 2006.

Williams played for Puerto Rico in the 2006 MLB World Baseball Classic, joining Carlos Delgado, Carlos Beltrán, Mike Lowell, Javier Vázquez, and José Vidro amongst others representing the U.S. territory in a team managed by St. Louis Cardinals third base coach Jose Oquendo. Williams hit two home runs in the 2006 WBC.

On July 26, 2006, Williams got his 2,300th career hit, becoming the 11th active player in the Majors with 2,300 or more career hits. Williams continued to climb the Yankees record books by hitting his 443rd career double on August 16, 2006, surpassing then-bench coach Don Mattingly for second-most as a Yankee. For the year, he walked only 7.3% of the time, a career-worst.

==== Out of contract ====
Williams' contract expired at the end of the 2006 season. He had hoped to return to the Yankees in 2007 and was willing to accept a role as a back-up outfielder and pinch hitter. The Yankees offered Williams an invitation to spring training as a non-roster invitee, giving him a chance to compete for a job. Williams, however, wanted a guaranteed roster spot and declined the invitation.

On September 21, 2008, Williams made his first return to Yankee Stadium since 2006 for the ceremonies preceding the final game at the stadium. He was the last former player to be introduced and received a standing ovation that lasted a minute and 42 seconds.

==== 2009 World Baseball Classic ====
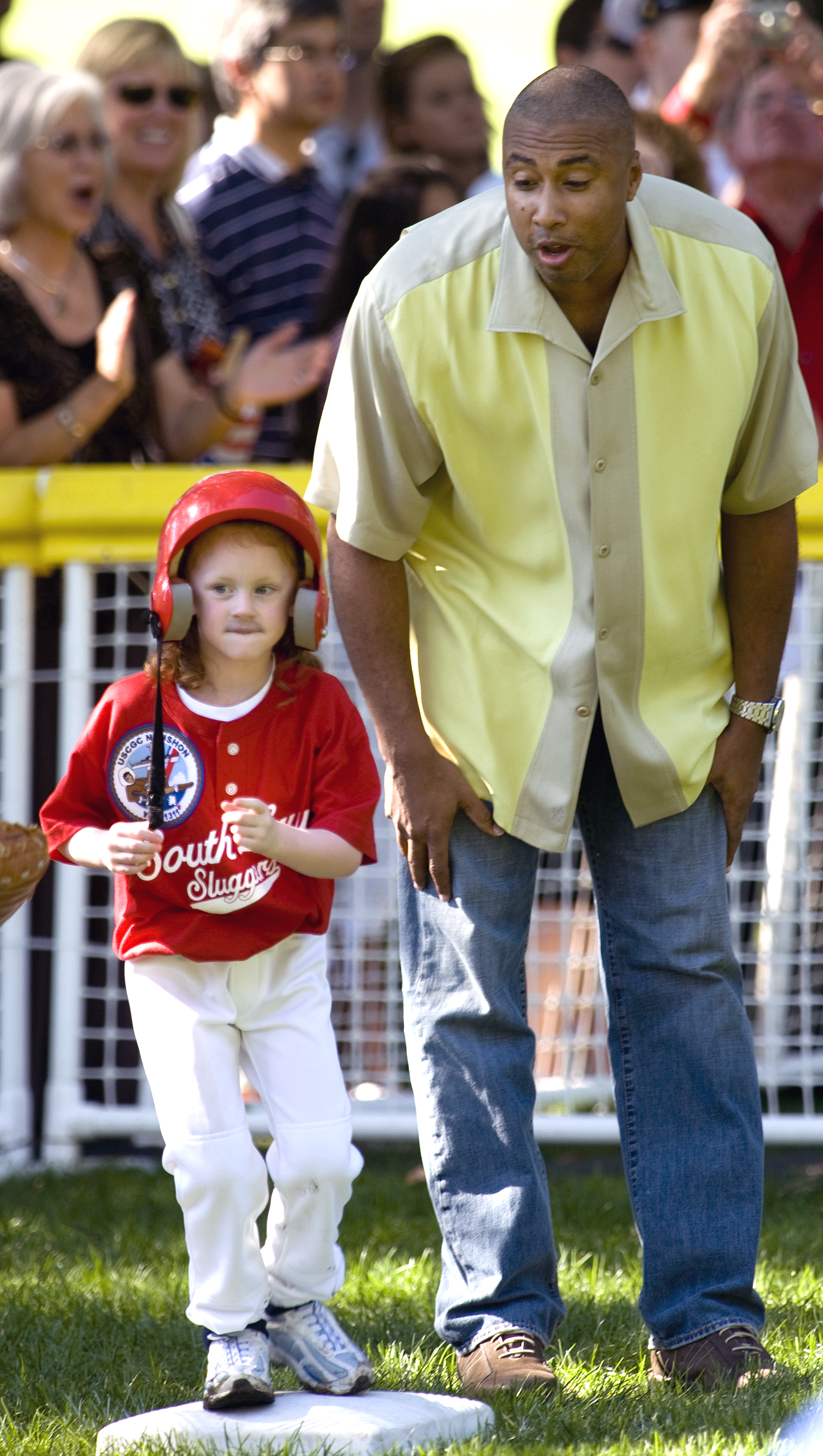
Williams coaching tee-ball in 2008

After two years of inactivity, Williams returned to action in 2008, playing for the Gigantes de Carolina in the Puerto Rico Baseball League. He was interested in gauging his condition prior to possibly participating in the 2009 World Baseball Classic. MLB.com reported on December 30, 2008, that Williams had injured his quad while playing for Carolina and may not be able to play in the World Baseball Classic for Puerto Rico.

On February 19, 2009, Williams worked out with the Yankees at the team's spring training complex. Williams hinted that if he performed well in the World Baseball Classic he might consider returning to the Yankees.

In March 2009 he played for Puerto Rico in the World Baseball Classic, going 0-for-5 with two walks; after the series concluded, he expressed interest in playing in the Major Leagues again.

==== Retirement ====
Though he did not appear in a Major League Baseball game after 2006, Williams did not officially retire until 2015. At the February 2011 retirement press conference for Andy Pettitte, Williams acknowledged that his career was over and stated that he would officially announce his retirement soon thereafter. Williams officially retired on April 24, 2015, with the Yankees.

== MLB statistics ==
Williams' major league stats:

Years	Games	AB	Runs	Hits	2B	3B	HR	RBI	SB	CS	BB	SO	AVG	OBP	SLG	OPS	E	FLD%
16	2,076	7,869	1,366	2,336	449	55	287	1,257	147	87	1,069	1,012	.297	.381	.477	.858	48	.990

== Career perspective ==
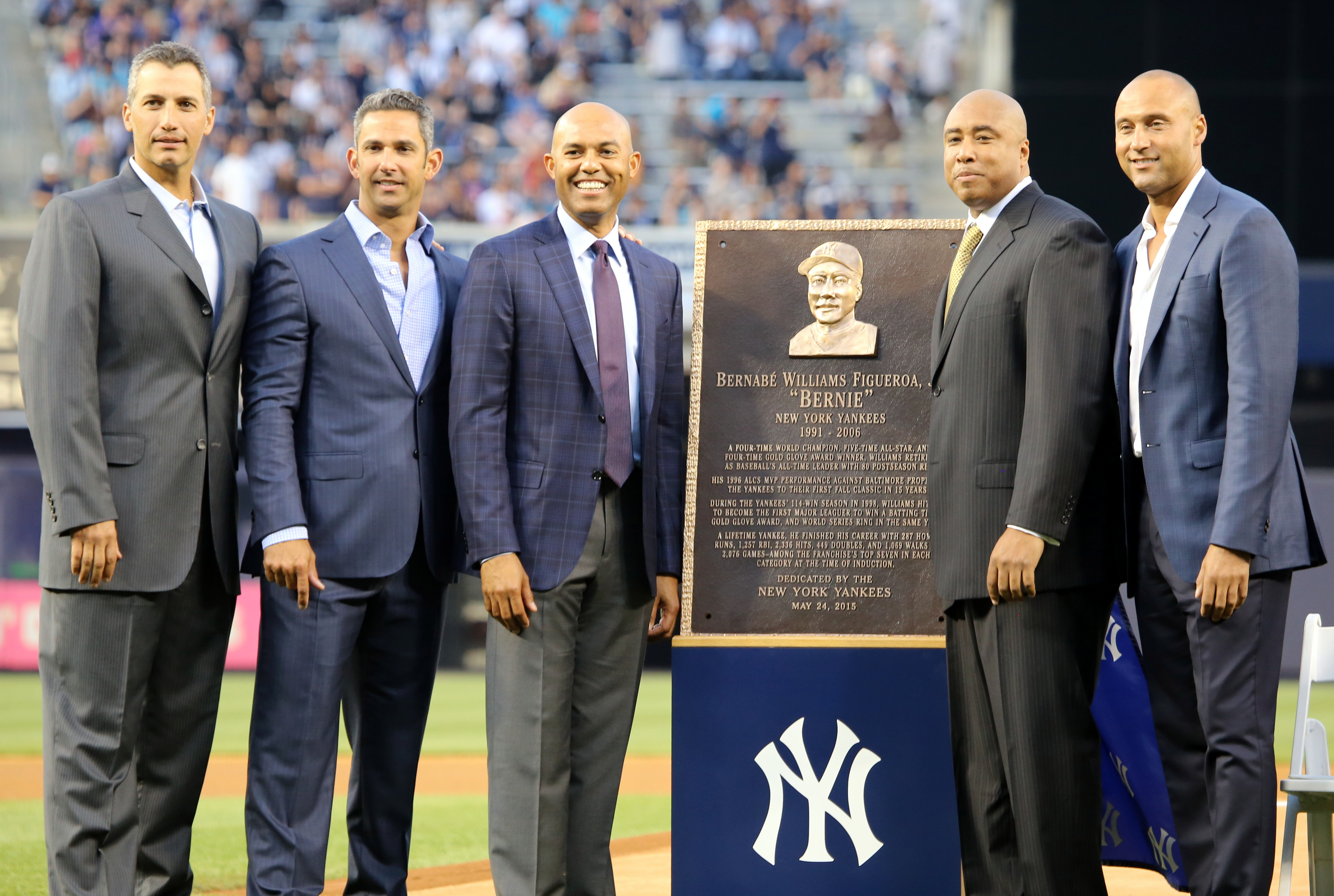
Williams with former teammates after the unveiling of his Yankee Stadium plaque. From left: Andy Pettitte, Jorge Posada, Mariano Rivera, Williams, and Derek Jeter.

As of 2026, he holds the career postseason record for runs batted in (80). He is also fifth all-time in postseason home runs (22) and third in games played (121) and runs scored (83) while being second in doubles (29), total hits (128), walks (71), and total bases (223). Standing on Yankee all-time lists as of the beginning of the 2026 season:

- 3rd all-time in doubles
- 5th all-time in walks
- 5th all-time in hits
- 6th all-time in extra-base hits
- 7th all-time in RBIs
- 8th all-time in home runs

Williams appeared on the Hall of Fame ballot for the first time in 2012. He received 55 votes for 9.6%. The next year, Williams received 19 votes (3.3%). Since he received votes on fewer than 5% of ballots, Williams was not eligible to appear on future ballots.

The Yankees announced in May 2014 that they would honor Williams with a plaque in Monument Park during the 2015 season. On February 16, 2015, the Yankees also announced that they would be retiring Williams' number 51. On May 24, the Yankees unveiled Williams's plaque and retired his number in a ceremony at Yankee Stadium.

== Music career ==
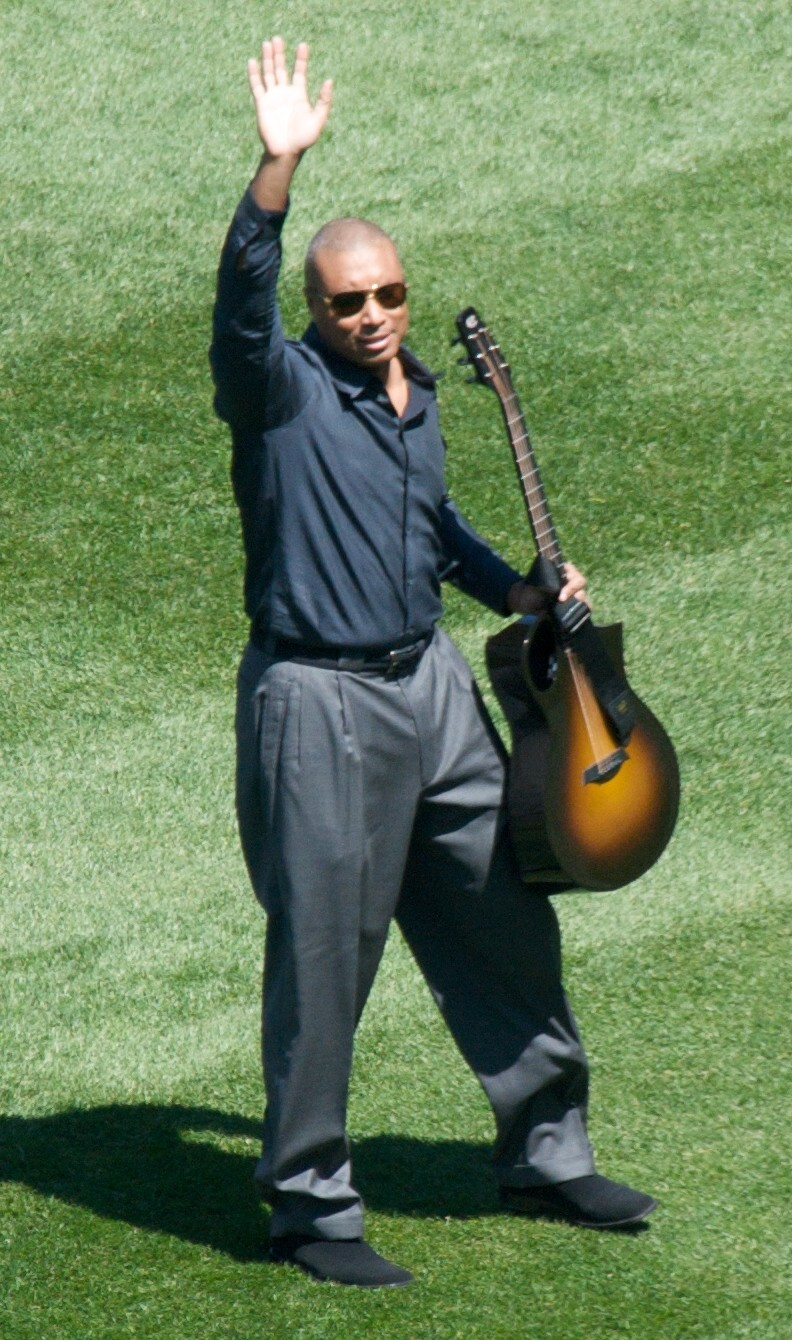
Williams greeting fans during a pregame musical performance at the new Yankee Stadium in 2009

A classically trained guitarist, Williams plays and composes music with influences that include jazz, classical, pop, Brazilian, and Latin sounds.

Williams signed with Paul McCartney's publishing company, MPL Communications, and his major label debut, The Journey Within, was released on June 22, 2003. In addition to playing lead and rhythm guitar, Williams composed seven songs for the album. Tracks like "La Salsa En Mi" and "Desvelado" mix his love of jazz with Latin rhythms. The first single was a remix of his "Just Because," featuring David Benoit. Other highlights include Williams' heartfelt tribute to his father, "Para Don Berna;" a reworking of the Baden Powell song, "Samba Novo;" and "La Salsa En Mi," featuring background vocals from 2003 Grammy Award winner Rubén Blades and salsa legend Gilberto Santa Rosa. Also joining Williams was an all-star ensemble of musicians including multiple Grammy-winning banjo player Béla Fleck, keyboardist David Sancious, percussionist Luis Conte, bassist Leland Sklar, guitarist Tim Pierce, and drummers Kenny Aronoff and Shawn Pelton, among others.

Following his career with the New York Yankees, Williams studied guitar and composition for a year at the State University of New York at Purchase in preparation for his album, Moving Forward, which was released on April 14, 2009, under the Reform Records label. The album features fourteen tracks and includes some collaborative tracks with other artists such as Bruce Springsteen, Patti Scialfa, Jon Secada, and Dave Koz. Williams was nominated for a Latin Grammy Award for Moving Forward.

In 2010, Williams participated in the World Rhythms Tour with Basia. On July 18, 2010, he performed at the 2010 Central American and Caribbean Games opening ceremony.

In July 2011, the book Rhythms of the Game: The Link Between Musical and Athletic Performance, co-authored by Williams, Dave Gluck, and Bob Thompson, with a foreword by Paul Simon, was published by Hal Leonard Publishing.

Williams was featured on the November/December 2011 cover of Making Music to discuss his life and career in music.

Williams received his Bachelor of Music from the Manhattan School of Music on May 13, 2016.

=== Discography ===
Albums

Year	Title	Chart positions	
Year	Title	US	U.S. Jazz
2003	The Journey Within: Released: July 15, 2003; Label: GRP	157	3
2009	Moving Forward: Released: April 14, 2009; Label: Reform	178	2

Singles

Year	Title	Peak chart positions	Album
Year	Title	Smooth Jazz Airplay	Album
2009	"Go for It"	1	Moving Forward
2009	"Ritmo De Otono" (Bernie Williams featuring Dave Koz)	1	Moving Forward
2010	"Moving Forward"	18	Moving Forward

== Philanthropy ==
Williams' love of music shines through in his philanthropy efforts with Little Kids Rock, a national nonprofit organization that works to restore and revitalize music education in disadvantaged U.S. public schools. Little Kids Rock honored the Yankees icon with the 2010 "Big Man of the Year" award at the annual Right to Rock celebration. Williams performed onstage with students and signed some guitars to be auctioned. With the money he helped raise, Williams delivered instruments to a school in the Bronx and gave the students a lesson in music and life.

In July 2018, Williams went to Puerto Rico to take part in a special episode of Bar Rescue on the Paramount Network to help people affected by Hurricane Maria, rebuilding a bar and baseball field.

== Personal life ==
Williams married Waleska on February 23, 1990 and had three children: Bernie Jr., Beatriz, and Bianca. A song on Williams' 2009 release, Moving Forward, is named after Beatriz: "Lullaby for Beatriz." This song is performed by Williams with his brother, Hiram Williams, playing the cello. This song was recorded in Puerto Rico at the Alpha Recording Studios.

On June 14, 2018, Williams stated he was divorced during an interview on ESPN's Highly Questionable.

Williams appeared on an episode of the sitcom Seinfeld as himself.

== Bibliography ==
- Posada, Jorge; Posada, Laura; Williams, Bernie (2009). Fit Home Team: The Posada Family Guide to Health, Exercise, and Nutrition the Inexpensive and Simple Way. Simon and Schuster. ISBN 9781439149614.
- Williams, Bernie; Gluck, Dave; Thompson, Bob (2011). Rhythms of the Game: The Link Between Musical and Athletic Performance. Hal Leonard Corporation. ISBN 978-1423499473.

== See also ==
- Afro–Puerto Ricans
- List of Major League Baseball career bases on balls leaders
- List of Major League Baseball career games played as a center fielder leaders
- List of Major League Baseball career hits leaders
- List of Major League Baseball career putouts as a center fielder leaders
- List of Major League Baseball career runs scored leaders
- List of Major League Baseball career runs batted in leaders
- List of Major League Baseball career home run leaders
- List of Major League Baseball players from Puerto Rico
- List of Major League Baseball players who spent their entire career with one franchise
- List of Puerto Ricans
- New York Yankees award winners and league leaders

Achievements
Preceded by Tim Salmon; Iván Rodríguez	American League Player of the Month; August 1997; May 1998	Succeeded by Juan González; Rafael Palmeiro
