= Planet X (band) =

Instrumental rock band

- Origin: United States
- Genres: Instrumental rock, progressive metal, jazz fusion
- Years active: 2000–2011
- Label: Inside Out
- Past members: Derek Sherinian; Virgil Donati; Alex Machacek; Dave LaRue; Tony MacAlpine; Brett Garsed; Tom Kennedy; Rufus Philpot; Ric Fierabracci
- Website: xplanetx.com

Planet X was an instrumental progressive metal supergroup, founded by keyboardist Derek Sherinian and drummer Virgil Donati. They were active for a decade, releasing three studio albums and a live album, each with a variety of guest musicians and oft-changing lineups.

== Background ==
After his four-year tenure with progressive metal band Dream Theater, Sherinian released his first solo album entitled Planet X in 1999. This concept was later expanded, in collaboration with drummer Virgil Donati, to form a group of the same name. Universe subsequently became Planet X's first studio album upon its release on June 6, 2000. For this recording, guitarist Tony MacAlpine was brought in to replace Brett Garsed, who had played on Sherinian's original Planet X album.

Live from Oz, a live album recorded during their 2002 Australian tour, was released on April 3 of that year. Their second studio album, MoonBabies, was released shortly after on July 29. It was produced by Simon Phillips. Five years later, Quantum, their third album, was released on May 18, 2007. This lineup featured two guest appearances from jazz fusion guitarist Allan Holdsworth, with Garsed returning for overall guitar duties.

On April 18, 2009, an announcement was made on Tony MacAlpine's MySpace profile that he had rejoined the group, with a new album set to be recorded later in the year. However, he later stated in an October 2012 interview that he was no longer a member of the group.

== Compositions and style ==
The band's style has been described as "metal fusion", with Sherinian stating that his intention upon founding Planet X was "to find musicians that played their instruments so fiercely, it would strike fear in the hearts of other musicians when they played". Their compositions are predominantly instrumental, save for the one-time spoken word by Dick Smothers Jr. on "King of the Universe" from Universe. Each composition typically comprises numerous and frenetic changes in time signature, with very heavy guitar work (including the use of seven-string guitars) and dense layering of all instruments.

The synergy between each musician and their instrument provides a very distinct and unique blend of musical styles. Keyboards usually serve as an introduction and to establish some form of background melody (often using dissonant intervals and chord progressions to create an ominous, space-like atmosphere), although Sherinian's signature keyboard solos are always a prominent feature. Rhythm and lead guitars tend to build up and progress independently (usually involving shredding and other advanced soloing techniques), whilst other times they work together with the keyboards in counterpoint and trade-offs, in addition to bass solos. All the while, Donati's drum work is dynamic and makes frequent use of polyrhythms, metric modulation and shifting tempos which fuse the styles of heavy metal, jazz and progressive rock.

== Band members ==
=== Last members ===
- Derek Sherinian – keyboard (2000–2011)
- Virgil Donati – drums (2000–2011)
- Dave LaRue – bass (2008–2011)
- Alex Machacek – guitar (2009–2011)

=== Past members ===
- Tony MacAlpine – guitar (2000–2006)
- Brett Garsed – guitar (2006–2009)
- Tom Kennedy – bass (2000–2003)
- Ric Fierabracci – bass (2003–2006)
- Rufus Philpot – bass (2006–2008)

== Discography ==
- 2000: Universe
- 2002: Live from Oz (live)
- 2002: MoonBabies
- 2007: Quantum
- 2023: Anthology (all four albums remastered by Simon Phillips)
