= Quantum (album) =

Studio album by Planet X
- Released: May 18, 2007
- Recorded: Beachwood Manor Studios in Burbank, California
- Genre: Instrumental rock, progressive metal, jazz fusion
- Length: 50:47
- Label: Inside Out
- Producer: Planet X

Planet X chronology
MoonBabies (2002)	Quantum (2007)

Quantum is the third studio album by instrumental rock/progressive metal supergroup Planet X, released in 2007 through Inside Out Music. Guitarist Allan Holdsworth was originally slated to feature on most tracks, but ended up not finishing the project. As a result, his solos remain only on "Desert Girl" and "The Thinking Stone".

== Critical reception ==
Professional ratings
Review scores
Source	Rating
AllMusic	4/5 stars

François Couture at AllMusic gave Quantum four stars out of five, calling it "a quantum leap above previous Planet X releases" and "a surprisingly mature album". He praised the album's stronger compositions and better diversity over previous Planet X material, and listed "Alien Hip Hop", "Matrix Gate", "Space Foam", "Kingdom of Dreams" and "Desert Girl" as highlights.

In a 2012 article by MusicRadar, ex-Dream Theater drummer Mike Mangini ranked the album tenth in his list of most influential drum albums.

== Track listing ==
All music is composed by Virgil Donati, except where noted.

No.	Title	Length
1.	"Alien Hip Hop"	7:13
2.	"Desert Girl"	6:05
3.	"Matrix Gate"	4:10
4.	"The Thinking Stone"	4:14
5.	"Space Foam" (Derek Sherinian, Donati, Rufus Philpot)	4:46
6.	"Poland"	5:23
7.	"Snuff"	4:59
8.	"Kingdom of Dreams"	6:48
9.	"Quantum Factor"	7:09
Total length:		50:47

== Personnel ==
- Derek Sherinian – keyboard, producer
- Virgil Donati – drums, orchestration, producer

Collaborators

- Brett Garsed – guitar, producer
- Allan Holdsworth – additional guitar solos (tracks 2, 4)
- Jimmy Johnson – bass (except tracks 5, 9)
- Rufus Philpot – bass (tracks 5, 9)
- Matt Flinker – engineering
- Jamie Black – engineering
- Steve Scanlon – mixing (except track 9), mastering
- Simon Phillips – mixing (track 9)

== Release history ==
Region	Date	Label
Austria, Germany, Switzerland	May 18, 2007	Inside Out
Rest of Europe	May 21, 2007	Inside Out
North America	May 22, 2007	Inside Out
