= Scott Henderson =

American guitarist (born 1954)

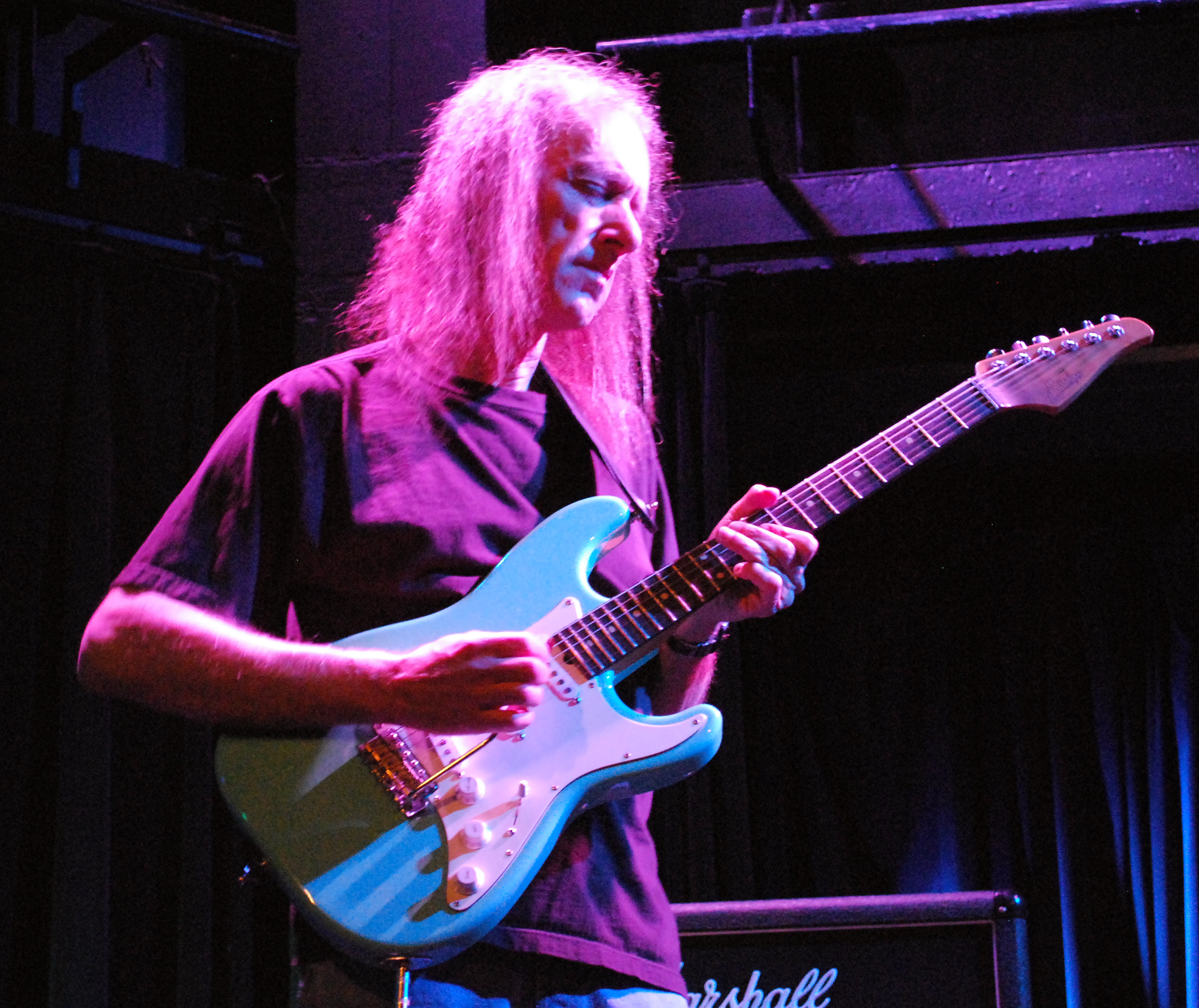
- Scott Henderson, 2010

Background information
- Born: August 26, 1954 (age 72); West Palm Beach, Florida, U.S.
- Genres: Jazz fusion, blues, instrumental rock
- Occupation: Musician
- Instrument: Guitar
- Labels: Passport, Relativity, Bluemoon, Tone Center, Atlantic, Zebra, Shrapnel
- Formerly of: Tribal Tech, Vital Tech Tones
- Website: www.scotthenderson.net

Scott Henderson (born August 26, 1954) is an American jazz fusion and blues guitarist best known for his work with the band Tribal Tech. He was born in West Palm Beach and raised in Lake Worth Beach.

== Biography ==
Henderson began his career as a blues-rock player. In addition to electric guitar (mostly Suhr models), Henderson plays electric sitar.

== Tribal Tech ==
Henderson formed Tribal Tech with bass player Gary Willis in 1984. In 1991 Henderson was named No. 1 Jazz Guitarist by Guitar World magazine, and in January 1992 he was voted Best Jazz Guitarist in Guitar Player magazine's Annual Readers' Poll.

Tribal Tech reunited and released an album entitled X in 2011, but in June 2014, Henderson posted on his message board that the band would again be dissolving.

== Other work ==
Since 1984, Henderson has taught at the Guitar Institute of Technology, which is part of the Musicians Institute in Hollywood, California.

== Discography ==
=== As leader ===
With Tribal Tech

- Spears (Passport Jazz, 1985)
- Dr. Hee (Passport Jazz, 1987)
- Nomad (Relativity, 1990)
- Tribal Tech (Relativity, 1991)
- Illicit (Bluemoon, 1992)
- Face First (Bluemoon, 1993)
- Reality Check (Bluemoon, 1995)
- Thick (ESC; Zebra, 1999)
- Rocket Science (ESC; Tone Center, 2000)
- X (Tone Center, 2012)

=== Solo albums ===
- Dog Party (Bluemoon, 1994)
- Tore Down House (Bluemoon, 1997)
- Well to the Bone (ESC; Blues Bureau International, 2002)
- Live! (Tone Center, 2005)
- Vibe Station (Scott Henderson Productions, 2015)
- People Mover (Scott Henderson Productions, 2019)
- Karnevel! (Scott Henderson Productions, 2024)

As Vital Tech Tones (with Steve Smith and Victor Wooten)

- Vital Tech Tones (Tone Center, 1998)
- VTT2 (Tone Center, 2000)

As HBC (with Jeff Berlin and Dennis Chambers)

- HBC (Tone Center, 2012)

=== As sideman ===
- Steve Bailey, Dichotomy (Victor [jp], 1992)
- Gregg Bissonette, Siblings (Dogs in Space Music, 1992)
- Gregg Bissonette, Gregg Bissonette (Mascot, 1998)
- Jeff Berlin, Champion (Passport Jazz, 1985)
- Tom Coster, The Forbidden Zone (JVC, 1994)
- Sandeep Chowta, Matters of the Heart (Sony, 2013)
- Billy Childs, I've Known Rivers (Stretch, 1995)
- Carl Verheyen, Trading 8s (Cranktone, 2009)
- Chick Corea, The Chick Corea Elektric Band (GRP, 1986)
- Dennis Chambers, Groove and More (Soul Trade, 2013)
- Gerald Gradwohl, Tritone Barrier (ESC, 2007)
- Virgil Donati, Just Add Water (Thunder Drum, 1997)
- Jean-Luc Ponty, Fables (Atlantic, 1985)
- Scott Kinsey, Kinesthetics (Abstract Logix, 2006)
- Bernie Williams, Moving Forward (Reform, 2009)
- Joe Zawinul, The Immigrants (Columbia, 1988)
- Joe Zawinul, Black Water (Columbia, 1989)
- Joe Zawinul, Vienna Nights: Live at Joe Zawinul's Birdland (BHM, 2005)
