= Virgil Donati =

Australian drummer (born 1958)

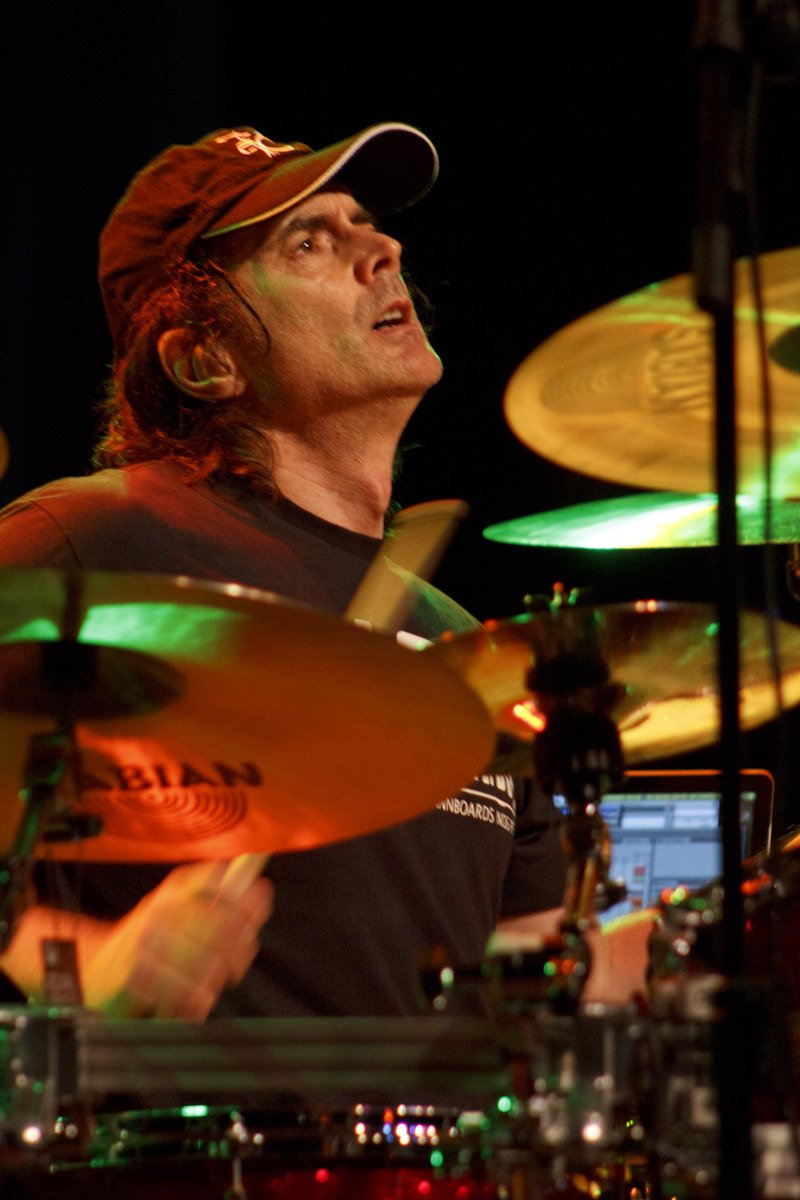
- Donati performing in 2011

Background information
- Born: 22 October 1958 (age 67); Melbourne, Australia
- Genres: Instrumental rock; hard rock; pop rock; progressive metal; neoclassical metal; jazz fusion
- Occupation: Musician
- Instruments: Drums, keyboards
- Years active: 1972–present
- Member of: Asia
- Formerly of: Planet X; Ring of Fire; CAB; The State; Allan Holdsworth; Southern Sons; Taste; Soul SirkUS; U.K.; Seven the Hardway
- Website: virgildonati.info

Virgil Donati (born 22 October 1958) is an Australian drummer. He holds the drum sticks in the traditional style and is also proficient at the keyboard. Donati formed Planet X with Derek Sherinian and was the band's principal composer on all their albums. He also performed in Melbourne with Jack Jones (Irwin Thomas) in a Van Halen tribute band known as Hans Valen before inviting Jones into Donati's own bands The State and Southern Sons. According to the All About Jazz website, Donati is "widely recognized as one of the most dedicated and technically advanced drummers of all time".

== Early life and career ==
Virgil Donati was born in Melbourne, Australia, of Italian descent. He got his first drumset at age two. He started playing soon after with his father's showband, and kept on doing these shows until he was around six years old. He then started taking piano lessons. He joined his first major rock band and signed with his first major record label at the age of 15. The band was first called Cloud Nine, but was later renamed Taste, with whom he recorded three albums. Soon after at age 16, Donati left school focusing mainly on the drums, but also piano. At age 19, he travelled to the U.S. to study with Philly Joe Jones, and at Dick Groves School in Los Angeles. He also took lessons from snare drum specialist Murray Spivack and Rob Carson.

== Success and bands ==
Donati returned to Australia at the age of 21. He then performed jazz with Allan Zavod and Brian Brown, and played with Peter Cupples' band. Before moving to Los Angeles, Donati furthered his success by performing with the likes of Tommy Emmanuel, Tina Arena, Jon Stevens and visiting international acts like Melissa Etheridge, Branford Marsalis, and Tribal Tech. Virgil also recorded and toured with his own bands Southern Sons, Loose Change and On The Virg. From the late 1990s and onwards Donati recorded and toured with acts like Derek Sherinian (with whom he formed the progressive fusion outfit Planet X), Steve Vai, Allan Holdsworth, Panzerballett with NDR Bigband, Michel Polnareff and Soul SirkUS. He played for Asia in "The Heat of the Moment" tour in 2024.

=== Influences ===
With his father's choice of records, including Louie Bellson and Buddy Rich albums, Donati quickly became a fan of those great jazz drummers, trying to emulate their solos. The first rock drummer to make a big impact on him was Ian Paice of Deep Purple. Donati said, "I was blown away with his playing, his clarity. Back in the early '70s he seemed to be an articulate drummer with a lot of soul in his playing. I loved his power and strength and the way he articulated his phrasing. I loved his approach." Other influences of his include John Bonham, Carl Palmer, Billy Cobham, Narada Michael Walden, Elvin Jones, Vinnie Colaiuta, Terry Bozzio, Neil Peart ,Tony Williams, Steve Gadd, and Philly Joe Jones. In a Modern Drummer magazine article of June 1999, Donati prefers playing with traditional grip. He says there, "I grew up playing traditional grip and persevered with it even under the physical duress of rock bands. I decided that it's just how I wanted to play. Now it's very natural for me. Besides, I've surmounted all the problems of being able to play with enough power. Traditional grip does not limit me in any way. There are certain movements around the drumset that feel good with traditional, and believe it or not, there're certain things I'll play that feel better in my left hand than in my right. That said, I would not necessarily recommend traditional grip. Frankly, I think the disadvantages involved with traditional grip outweigh the advantages. It is a far more difficult grip to maintain and to develop power with. Any student starting out would be better off focusing on matched. But for some reason, maybe just because it isn't used as much anymore, traditional grip seems to be more hip."

=== Reception ===
Virgil Donati is widely regarded as one of the most technically advanced drummers of all time. Bassist Bryan Beller, after performing with Donati and Mike Keneally, described him in a blog post with the following words: "Imagine the technical accuracy of Mike Mangini, the off-the-rails phrasing of Vinnie Colaiuta, the beat-displacement of Dave Weckl, and the rock sensibility of Tommy Aldridge, and that's pretty much Virgil Donati—all of it, all at once, all the time. Talk about being taken along for a ride". Dream Theater drummer Mike Portnoy called Donati "super, super technical" and cited him as a drummer he "can't replicate", saying that "[he] does things that I physically can't do."

Donati's piano playing can be heard on his 2016 album 'The Dawn of Time' as well as in various online videos where he's playing the like of Debussy and Ravel.

== Discography ==
=== Solo ===
- Stretch (1995, Musos Publications)
- Just Add Water (1997, Thunder Drum Records)
- Serious Young Insects (On The Virg band) (1999, Vorcity Music)
- Made in Australia (Gambale, Donati, Fierabracci) (2007, Wombat Records)
- In This Life (2013, Self-released)
- The Dawn of Time: Orchestral Works (2016, Self-released)
- Ruination (2019, Self-released)

=== With Planet X ===
- Universe (2000, InsideOut Music)
- Live from Oz (2002, InsideOut Music)
- MoonBabies (2002, InsideOut Music)
- Quantum (2007, InsideOut Music)
- Anthology (2023, self produced re-mastered collection of the 4 previous albums)

=== With Ring of Fire ===
- The Oracle (2001, Avalon Records)
- Burning Live Tokyo (2002, Frontiers, Marquee)
- Dreamtower (2002, Frontiers)
- Lapse of Reality (2004, King Records)

=== Jane Rutter ===
Blo (re-released as Titania's Dream with Peter Bowman)

=== With Southern Sons ===
- Southern Sons (1990, RCA)
- Nothing But the Truth (1992, RCA)
- Zone (1995, RCA)

=== With The State ===
- Elementary (1989)

=== With Icefish ===
- Human Hardware (2017)

=== Other ===
- Jon Stevens - Are U Satisfied (1993, Columbia Records)
- Derek Sherinian - Planet X (1999, Magna Carta)
- Ivan Grand Solberg, Golden State Mariachi Ministry - Lie Detector For Upgraded Strings And Orchestra (1999, Grand Fusion Science)
- Mark Boals - Ring of Fire (2000, Frontiers)
- Steve Walsh - Glossolalia (2000, Magna Carta)
- Joel Hoekstra - Undefined (2000)
- Uncle Moe's Space Ranch - Uncle Moe's Space Ranch (2001, Tone Center)
- Mark Boals - Edge of the World (2002, Frontiers)
- Erik Norlander - Music Machine (2003, Think Tank Media)
- Freakhouse - Beautiful Misery (2003, Reality Entertainment)
- Joel Hoekstra - The Moon Is Falling (2003)
- Bunny Brunel's L.A. Zoo - Revisited (2004, Mascot Records)
- Dave Weiner - Shove the Sun Aside (2005, Favored Nations)
- Sir Millard Mulch - How to Sell the F#@!ing Universe to Everybody Once and for All - Hemisphere III: Hermes (2005, Mimicry Records)
- Soul SirkUS - World Play (2005, Frontiers Records)
- Uncle Moe's Space Ranch - Moe's Town (2007, Tone Center)
- Alex Argento - EGO (2007, self-produced)
- Devil's Slingshot - Clinophobia (2007, Mascot Records)
- CAB - Theatre de Marionnettes (2009, Brunel Music)
- Derek Sherinian - Molecular Heinosity (2009, InsideOut Music)
- Seven the Hardway - Seven the Hardway (2010, Mascot Records)
- Tony MacAlpine - Tony MacAlpine (2011, FN Entertainment)
- Kiko Loureiro - Sounds of Innocence (2012, Victor Entertainment)
- Daniel Piquê - OLDBOY (websingle) (2013, Ultra Violence)
- Lalu - Atomic Ark (2013, Sensory Records)
- Synecron - Nathan Frost [2013, Nathan Frost]
- Semantic Saturation - Solipsistic (2013, Self-released)
- Nili Brosh - A Matter of Perception (2014)
- AFTERSHOCKS - Michael Kocab, Glenn Proudfoot, Virgil Donati, Billy Sheehan (2014)
- Beyond Turbines - Roberto Badoglio, Steve Hunt, Virgil Donati, Bjoessi Kluetsch (2015)
- Kazumi Watanabe - Spinning Globe (2016)
- Panzerballett - Planet Z (2020)
- Felipe Andreoli - Resonance (2021)
- Marco Sfogli - Welcome to Ooglyworld (2023)
- Riccardo Corso - Electric Vibe (2024)
- Panzerballett - Übercode Œuvre (2025)
- Asia - Indigo (2026)

== Videography ==
- Virgil Donati: Modern Drummer Festival 1997
- Virgil Donati: Live in Stockholm
- Visit Virgil's Online Store
- Virgil's Educational Lessons on isYOURteacher
- On The Virg: 'The Anatomy of Live'
