= T. J. Helmerich =

American musician and audio engineer

Todd Joseph “T. J.” Helmerich is an American musician and audio engineer.

Helmerich is known for developing a unique 8-finger style of playing his guitar, a technique he taught to a young Joel Hoekstra as one of his first guitar teachers. He has produced/engineered over 110 releases, working with some of the biggest names in the music industry. He has played/toured with Dweezil Zappa (Zappa Plays Zappa), Planet X (band), Autograph (American band), Paul Gilbert, Eddie Jobson, and others. He has been featured in popular guitar magazines nationally/internationally in ads, articles, reviews and lessons. Together with Australian guitarist Brett Garsed, the duo helped define the direction of instrumental guitar music throughout the 1990s and establish the genre now known as rock fusion.

Helmerich resides in North Hollywood, California. He teaches guitar and audio engineering courses at Musicians Institute in Hollywood, California, where he created their "Recording Institute of Audio Engineering" (RIT) program. He held the directors seat at RIT for 10 years and has taught at the college for over 20. He can be caught performing regularly with an "all-star" line up at the world-famous The Baked Potato club.

== Audio Engineering Credits ==
Please click on the following links:

== Releases as Musician ==
Helmerich has released 5 CDs with fellow guitarist Brett Garsed which are in the Rock/Jazz Fusion medium:

- Quid Pro Quo (1992)
- Exempt (1994)
- Under the Lash of Gravity (1999)
- Uncle Moe's Space Ranch (2001)
- Moe's Town (2007)

Helmerich has recorded guitar or vocals on the following releases:

- When Four Become One- (Vinyl 1985) Premonition
- Chicago's Class of 87'- (Vinyl 1987) Premonition
- Dog Party Scott Henderson
- Buzz Autograph (American band)
- Guitar on the Edge (Volumes 1–3) - Legato Records
- On the Brink - Monica Mancillas
- Centrifugal Funk - Legato Records
- Goovin' In Tongues Bobby Rock
- Guitarapalooza Vol. 1- Woo Music
- The Loner-Tribute to Jeff Beck- ESC Records
- Fearless - ZIV
- Serious Young Insects Virgil Donati
- Party with Yourself- Gnaposs
- Liquid Piece of Me- Sergio Buss
- Out of Body Bobby Rock
- Go with what you know Dweezil Zappa
- Outsider- Gnaposs
- This is Fusion Guitar Tone Center Records
- Return of the Son of... Dweezil Zappa

Helmerich's album with guitarist Brett Garsed, titled Uncle Moe's Space Ranch, received the following review from John Patterson of eer-music.com: "Strictly for those hip to the trip of loud, fast, and explosive. Enjoy axes dripping with riffs, bass that delivers seismically, drums that attack the primal bedrock and keys that will tie your ears in knots. T.J. had recorded a solo to vinyl first and then T.J./DJ scratched it in for the final mix. Unreal! These guys never cease to amuse and amaze me."
