= Tribal Tech =

American progressive fusion band

- Origin: Los Angeles, United States
- Genre: Jazz fusion
- Years active: 1984–2000, 2012–2014
- Labels: Passport Jazz, Relativity, Mesa, Zebra, Tone Center
- Past members: Scott Henderson; Gary Willis; Scott Kinsey; Kirk Covington; Pat Coil; Steve Houghton; Brad Dutz; Bob Sheppard; Will Boulware; David Goldblatt; Joey Heredia; Phil Nicholas; Hillary Jones

Tribal Tech was an American progressive fusion band, formed in 1984 by guitarist Scott Henderson and bass player Gary Willis. From 1993 forward the band included Scott Kinsey on keyboard and Kirk Covington on drums, and released ten albums that stretched the borders between blues, jazz, and rock. The band dissolved following the release of 2000's Rocket Science, with the various members pursuing solo careers. However, they re-formed to release another album, X, in 2012. In 2014, Henderson and Willis decided to disband once again.

== Personnel ==
Members:

- Scott Henderson - guitar
- Gary Willis - bass
- Scott Kinsey - keyboards
- Kirk Covington - drums

== Discography ==
- Spears (1985)
- Dr. Hee (1987)
- Nomad (1990)
- Tribal Tech (1991)
- Illicit (1992)
- Face First (1993)
- Primal Tracks (compilation) (1994)
- Reality Check (1995)
- Thick (1999)
- Rocket Science (2000)
- X (2012)
