= Kirk Covington =

American drummer

- Born: Kirk Leigh Covington; 1956 or 1957 (age 69–70); Midland, Texas, U.S.
- Genres: Jazz fusion
- Occupation: Musician
- Instrument: Drums
- Formerly of: Tribal Tech

Kirk Covington is an American drummer best known for his work with the jazz fusion group Tribal Tech.

Covington was born in Midland, Texas, where he attended the University of North Texas College of Music, where he met bassist Gary Willis, with whom he later joined Tribal Tech. Covington has performed or recorded with other musicians including Joe Zawinul, Robben Ford, Allan Holdsworth, Scott Henderson, and John Humphrey.

Covington has toured since 1998 with Scott Henderson and bass player John Humphrey, as a trio. In 2003 they recorded Well to the Bone.

Covington continues to play with former Tribal Tech partner Scott Kinsey, was a member of the group Volto! where he also played keyboards, and in 2008 formed his own trio, "CPT KIRK", with keyboardist Scott Tibbs and bassist Rufus Philpot.
