= Gary Willis =

American bassist and composer (born 1957)

Gary Willis (born 28 March 1957) is an American bassist and composer known foremost as the co-founder (with Scott Henderson) of the jazz fusion band Tribal Tech. Aside from his work in Tribal Tech, Willis has worked with numerous other jazz musicians including Wayne Shorter, Dennis Chambers, and Allan Holdsworth. "Slaughterhouse 3", released in 2006, continued his collaboration with drummer Kirk Covington as well as saxophonist Llibert Fortuny to form a modern jazz/funk/groove power-trio. Willis's latest solo CD Larger Than Life was released on the Abstractlogix label in 2015.

In addition to "Larger Than Life", Willis's solo career includes Retro from 2013, Actual Fiction from 2007, No Sweat from 1996 and Bent in 1998. Willis is also the author of four books for bass guitar, "Fingerboard Harmony for Bass", "The Gary Willis Collection", "Ultimate Ear Training for Guitar and Bass" and "101 Bass Tips" all published by Hal Leonard.

Willis, a Texas native, studied composition and improvisation at The University of North Texas College of Music, where he switched from guitar to bass. He is currently an instructor at the Catalonia College of Music in Barcelona, Spain.

Gary Willis uses his signature model Ibanez fretless 5-string bass guitar, Aguilar Amplifiers and D'Addario strings.

He is currently an instructor at Berklee's campus in Valencia, Spain.

== CD reviews ==
- Gary Willis | "Actual Fiction" and "Slaughterhouse 3"
- "Retro"
