= 7 (Sixx:A.M. EP) =

EP by Sixx:A.M.
- Released: December 13, 2011
- Recorded: November–December 2011
- Genres: Alternative rock, acoustic rock
- Length: 29:45
- Label: Eleven Seven Music
- Producer: Sixx:A.M.

Sixx:A.M. chronology
This Is Gonna Hurt (2011)	7 (2011)	Modern Vintage (2014)

7 is an EP by American hard rock trio Sixx:A.M., side project of Mötley Crüe's Nikki Sixx, released on December 13, 2011. The EP features 7 previously released songs from the band's previous two studio albums: The Heroin Diaries Soundtrack and This Is Gonna Hurt, in all-new acoustic stripped-down renditions.

The band has said several times that there is no meaning to the title of the EP being 7, except for the number of songs featured on it, and that it has no connection to the seven deadly sins, as many believed.

So far it is only available as a digital download and has not been released physically.

== Track listing ==
All lyrics are written by James Michael and Nikki Sixx.

No.	Title	Music	Length
1.	"Lies of the Beautiful People"	Nikki Sixx, James Michael, DJ Ashba, John "5" William Lowery	3:58
2.	"This Is Gonna Hurt"	Sixx, Michael, Ashba	4:46
3.	"Life Is Beautiful"	Sixx, Michael, Ashba	4:08
4.	"Help is on the Way"	Sixx, Michael, Ashba	4:06
5.	"Sure Feels Right"	Sixx, Michael, Ashba	4:08
6.	"Pray for Me"	Sixx, Michael, Ashba	4:29
7.	"Accidents Can Happen"	Sixx, Michael, Ashba	4:10
Total length:			29:45

== Personnel ==
- Nikki Sixx - bass guitar, backing vocals
- DJ Ashba - lead guitar, backing vocals
- James Michael - lead vocals, rhythm guitar, keyboards
