= P. R. Brown =

American artist and music video director

Paul R. Brown is an American graphic designer, photographer, and music video and commercial director.

== Biography ==
Brown's early career in graphic design started at Pentagram in London with Peter Saville and Brett Wickens, followed by Frankfurt Balkind in Los Angeles. From there he went to Capitol Records as an art director and then took the role of the Creative Director for October Films in New York.

In 1996, he founded the Bau-da Design Lab, which operates out of Los Angeles and New York. Brown is well known for his album designs for musicians such as Audioslave, Mötley Crüe, Korn, The Used, Godsmack, Papa Roach, and early in his career, he gained a particular notoriety for his work with Marilyn Manson. His career in the music video direction has included notable videos for a diverse array of musicians, including Carrie Underwood, My Chemical Romance, John Mayer, Three Days Grace, Billy Corgan (as well as Corgan's band, The Smashing Pumpkins), Evanescence, Seal, Audioslave, Prince, Jack White, Alicia Keys, Slipknot, Sevendust, Bullet for My Valentine, Avenged Sevenfold, Staind, Matisyahu, Mötley Crüe, Goo Goo Dolls, Miley Cyrus, Snoop Lion, Static-X, Green Day, and Death Cab for Cutie.

In 2008, Brown was nominated for a Grammy award for his work on the music video "Another Way To Die" by musicians Jack White and Alicia Keys. That same year, he directed a neo-noir web series for Crackle entitled Coma.

== Filmography ==
2022

- "Chris Watts" – SKYND
- "Armin Meiwes" – SKYND

2020

- "Fare Thee Well" – Stone Temple Pilots
- "The Chain" – Evanescence
- "Wasted on You" – Evanescence
- "The Game Is Over" – Evanescence

2019

- "The Hunted" – Saint Asonia

2018

- "Love Someone" – Lukas Graham
- "Don't Say You Love Me" – Fifth Harmony
- "Unheavenly Creatures" – Coheed and Cambria
- "Hi-Lo" – Evanescence

2017

- "Fabuless" – Stone Sour
- "Imperfection" – Evanescence

2016

- "Still Breathing" – Green Day

2015

- "Little Toy Guns" – Carrie Underwood
- "Better Place" – Saint Asonia

2014

- "One Fine Thing" – Harry Connick Jr.
- "Perdón" – Camila

2013

- "Pepsi Challenge" – Pepsi
- "Mad and the Monstrous trailer" – Square Enix
- "La Da Dee" – Cody Simpson
- "You Think You Know" – Device
- "Crushin" – Bushhawg
- "Diet Pepsi check out with Josh Duhamel" – Diet Pepsi
- "NFL/Pepsi Unbelievable moments – Pepsi Next
- "There's No Going Back" – Sick Puppies
- "Ashtrays and Heartbreaks" – Miley Cyrus & Snoop Lion
- "This is our Evolution" – Living Dead Lights
- "Rebel Beat" – Goo Goo Dolls
- "Hung Up" – Hot Chelle Rae
- "Two Black Cadillacs" – Carrie Underwood
- "Vilify" – Device
- "Wingman" – commercial
- "Apex Predator" – Otep

2012

- "Shooter" – short film, kickstarter-financed March 15, 2012
- "Riot" – Bullet for My Valentine
- "Little Spaceman" – Google commercial
- "Problem (The Monster Remix)" – Becky G featuring Will.i.am
- "Only One" – Sammy Adams
- "Stand Up" – All That Remains
- "Absolute Zero" – Stone Sour
- "Gone Sovereign" – Stone Sour
- "Code" – Mack
- "Zombies" – CHP PSA
- "McShake" – McDonald's
- "Scavenger Hunt" – Ford/American Idol
- "Hats Off to the Bull" – Chevelle
- "Comin' Around" – Josh Thompson
- "Angels & Stars" – Eric Turner featuring Lupe Fiasco and Tinie Tempah

2011

- "Hell in a Handbasket" – Meat Loaf
- "Face to the Floor" – Chevelle
- "Gimme All Your Lovin'" – Filter
- "Electric Eye" – As I Lay Dying
- "The Ghost" – The Hot Gates
- "Not Again" – Staind
- "Dance Without You" – Skylar Grey
- "C'mon" – B'z
- "Ate o Fim" – Madame Saatan
- "Respira" – Madame Saatan
- "Walking Dead Man" – Black Tide
- "That Fire" – Black Tide
- "Fireflies" – Ford/American Idol
- "Be Yourself" – Ford/American Idol
- "World" – Ford/American Idol
- "All This Beauty" – Ford/American Idol
- "Badass" – Saliva
- "The world" – Ford/American Idol
- "Don't Wanna Lie" – B'z
- "Lies of the Beautiful People" – Sixx:A.M.

2010

- "Blackline Commercial" – Harley Davidson
- "XM@$" – Corey Taylor
- "Sing" – My Chemical Romance
- "Digital (Did You Tell)" – Stone Sour
- "Nowhere" – Murderdolls
- "Hesitate" – Stone Sour
- "Issues" – Escape the Fate
- "Say You'll Haunt Me" – Stone Sour
- "My Dark Place Alone" – Murderdolls
- "Half of My Heart" – John Mayer
- "Believe" – American Idol/Ford
- "Frozen Moment" – American Idol/Ford
- "All Night Long" – Buckcherry
- "Kung Fu Fighting" – American Idol/Ford
- "Our Time Now" – American Idol/Ford
- "Your Betrayal" – Bullet for My Valentine
- "The Last Fight" – Bullet for My Valentine
- "Tonight" – Dommin

2009

- "Tattoos & Tequila" – Vince Neil
- "Snuff" – Slipknot (co-directed with Shawn Crahan)
- "Letter from a Thief" – Chevelle
- "Hazardous" – Vanessa Amorosi
- "Doesn't Mean Anything" – Alicia Keys
- "Break" – Three Days Grace
- "Smash the Control Machine" – Otep
- "Let Down" – Dead By Sunrise
- "Crawl Back In" – Dead By Sunrise
- "Still Unbroken" – Lynyrd Skynyrd
- "One Day" – Matisyahu
- "Move Along" – American Idol – Ford commercial
- "Energy" – American Idol – Ford commercial
- "Mixed Up" – American Idol – Ford commercial
- "Pocket Full of Sunshine" – American Idol – Ford commercial
- "We Will Rock You" – American Idol – Ford commercial
- "Chocolate Box" – Prince featuring Q-Tip
- "Crimson and Clover" – Prince
- "Sulfur" – Slipknot
- "The Letter" feat. Vanessa Amorosi – Hoobastank (co-directed with Jess Carfield)
- "Crüe Fest Live DVD" – Mötley Crüe/Buckcherry/Papa Roach/Trapt
- "White Trash Circus" – Mötley Crüe

2008

- "My Turn" – Hoobastank
- "Dead Memories" – Slipknot
- "Another Way to Die" (theme from Quantum of Solace) – Alicia Keys and Jack White
- "Elephants" – Rachael Yamagata
- "Crüe Fest Live DVD" – Mötley Crüe
- "Mutherfucker of the Year" – Mötley Crüe
- "Tomorrow" – Sixx:A.M.
- "Psychosocial" – Slipknot
- "Who's Going Home with You Tonight?" – Trapt
- "Five Star Band" – Mead commercial
- "Saints of Los Angeles" – Mötley Crüe
- "Pray for Me" – Sixx:A.M.
- "The Stone" – Ashes Divide
- "Hollywood's Not America" – Ferras
- "The Step and the Walk" – The Duke Spirit
- "Great Divide" – Hanson
- "Accidents Can Happen" – Sixx:A.M.

2007

- "Confrontation" – Otep
- "Amazing" – Seal
- "Breed" – Otep
- "Almost Easy" – Avenged Sevenfold
- "That's the Way (My Love Is)" – Smashing Pumpkins
- "Over You" – Daughtry
- "1973" – James Blunt
- "My World" – Emigrate
- "New York City" – Emigrate
- "Life Is Beautiful" – Sixx:A.M.
- "Tarantula" – Smashing Pumpkins
- "Sweet Sacrifice" – Evanescence
- "Cry Over Me" – Meat Loaf
- "February Song" – Josh Groban

2006

- "Ghost Flowers" – Otep
- "Different Than You" – The Exies
- "Oh! Gravity." – Switchfoot
- "Crazy Bitch" (2nd version) – Buckcherry
- "Next 2 You" – Buckcherry
- "Wanna Love U Girl (Remix Feat. Busta Rhymes & Pharrell)" – Robin Thicke
- "Let Love In" – Goo Goo Dolls
- "It's All Coming Back to Me Now" – Meat Loaf
- "Original Fire" – Audioslave
- "Outrageous" – Paul Simon
- "30/30-150" – Stone Sour
- "Stay with You" – Goo Goo Dolls
- "Cold (But I'm Still Here)" – Evans Blue
- "Promise (You and Me)" – Reamonn
- "Marching Bands of Manhattan" – Death Cab for Cutie

2005

- "King Without a Crown" – Matisyahu
- "Something Inside of Me" – Wicked Wisdom
- "Ugly" – Sevendust
- "Where Do You Draw the Line?" – From Autumn to Ashes
- "Brother" – Dark New Day
- "I'm the One" – Static-X
- "Same Old Situation" – Mötley Crüe
- "Sick Love Song" – Mötley Crüe
- "I Walked With a Zombie" – Wednesday 13
- "Walking Shade" – Billy Corgan

2004

- "If I Die Tomorrow" – Mötley Crüe
- "Lilacs and Lolita" – From Autumn to Ashes
- "Warhead" – Otep
- "Buried Alive" – Otep
- "Shut the Fuck Up" – Brides of Destruction
- "Lost Without Each Other" – Hanson

2003

- "The Only" – Static-X
- "Remember" – Presence
- "Brick By Brick" – Grade 8
- "Transdermal Celebration" – Ween
- "Down Again" – Chimaira
- "I Could Care Less" – DevilDriver

2002

- "Milligram Smile" – From Autumn to Ashes
- "Build Your Cages" – Pulse Ultra
- "Dead in Hollywood" – Murderdolls
- "Anger Rising" – Jerry Cantrell
- "My Last Serenade" – Killswitch Engage
- "Fiend" – Coal Chamber
