= The Heroin Diaries =

The Heroin Diaries may refer to:

- The Heroin Diaries: A Year in the Life of a Shattered Rock Star, a book by Nikki Sixx
- The Heroin Diaries Soundtrack, an album by Sixx's band Sixx:A.M.
- The Heroin Diaries - X-Mas In Hell, an EP by Sixx:A.M.
- "Heroin Diaries", a song by Ligeia from Bad News
