= X-Mas in Hell =

EP by Sixx:A.M.
- Released: June 10, 2008
- Genres: Hard rock, alternative metal
- Length: 13:21
- Label: Eleven Seven Music
- Producer: Sixx:A.M.

Sixx:A.M. chronology
The Heroin Diaries Soundtrack (2007)	X-Mas in Hell (2008)	Live Is Beautiful (2008)

X-Mas in Hell is an EP by Sixx:A.M., side project of Mötley Crüe's Nikki Sixx. It was released June 10, 2008, and was a digital download only release.

== Track listing ==
All tracks are written by Sixx:A.M..

No.	Title	Length
1.	"Life Is Beautiful/X-Mas in Hell Mix"	4:14
2.	"Life Is Beautiful/X-Mas in Hell Mix (w/ Spoken Word)"	4:43
3.	"Life Is Beautiful (X-Mas Mix)"	4:24
Total length:		13:21

== Personnel ==
- Nikki Sixx - bass guitar, backing vocals
- DJ Ashba - lead guitar, backing vocals
- James Michael - lead vocals, rhythm guitar, keyboards
