= Live Is Beautiful =

EP by Sixx:A.M.
- Released: November 25, 2008
- Recorded: Crüe Fest - July–August 2008
- Genres: Hard rock, alternative metal
- Label: Eleven Seven Music
- Producer: Sixx:A.M.

Sixx:A.M. chronology
X-Mas In Hell (2008)	Live Is Beautiful (2008)	This Is Gonna Hurt (2011)

Live Is Beautiful is a live EP by Sixx:A.M., a side project of Mötley Crüe's Nikki Sixx, released both with the deluxe edition of The Heroin Diaries Soundtrack and separately, in 2008. The eight songs on the EP were recorded live during various performances of the band during Mötley Crüe's Crüe Fest in the summer of 2008.

== Track listing ==
All tracks are written by Sixx:A.M..

No.	Title	Length
1.	"X-Mas in Hell" (Live)	2:03
2.	"Pray for Me" (Live)	4:39
3.	"Heart Failure" (Live)	5:09
4.	"Intermission" (Live)	1:51
5.	"Dead Man's Ballet" (Live)	5:32
6.	"Tomorrow" (Live)	5:08
7.	"Accidents Can Happen" (Live)	4:39
8.	"Life Is Beautiful" (Live)	5:48

== Personnel ==
Sixx: A.M.

- Nikki Sixx - bass guitar, backing vocals
- DJ Ashba - lead guitar, backing vocals
- James Michael - lead vocals, rhythm guitar, keyboards

Additional musicians

- Tony Palermo - drums, percussion
