= Lies of the Beautiful People =

Single by Sixx:A.M.

from the album This Is Gonna Hurt
- Released: March 1, 2011
- Recorded: February–July 2010
- Genre: Hard rock; heavy metal; industrial rock
- Length: 3:58
- Label: Eleven Seven
- Songwriters: Nikki Sixx; James Michael; DJ Ashba; John 5

Sixx:A.M. singles chronology
"Accidents Can Happen" (2008)	"Lies of the Beautiful People" (2011)	"This Is Gonna Hurt" (2011)

"Lies of the Beautiful People" is the first single from Sixx:A.M.'s second studio album This Is Gonna Hurt, released on March 1, 2011.

== Background ==
The song (along with the rest of the album) is a departure from the post-grunge found on The Heroin Diaries Soundtrack, moving into a more 1990s industrial rock sound found in that is influenced by artists like Filter and Stabbing Westward.

Eddie Trunk's internet blog has announced that the lead single from the album would be called "Lies of the Beautiful People" and was released on March 1, 2011. On February 15, 2011, it was announced that the music video for the single would premiere on Nikki's radio show website Sixx Sense on February 16, 2011, 12:00AM ET / 9:00PM CT.

On February 25, 2011, the single was released for purchase on the European iTunes Store. The music video, released on February 16, 2011. It contains an introduction by Nikki Sixx, and followed by changing live shots of the band, as well as photographs shot by Sixx himself, and taken from his second book This Is Gonna Hurt: Music, Photography and Life Through the Distorted Lens of Nikki Sixx, on which the album This Is Gonna Hurt is based on.

== Charts ==
=== Weekly charts ===
Chart (2011)	Peak position
Canada Rock (Billboard)	6
US Hot Rock & Alternative Songs (Billboard)	7

=== Year-end charts ===
Chart (2011)	Position
US Hot Rock & Alternative Songs (Billboard)	14
