= Tomorrow (Sixx:A.M. song) =

Single by Sixx:A.M.

from the album The Heroin Diaries Soundtrack
- Released: 2008
- Recorded: 2007
- Length: 4:05
- Label: Eleven Seven Music
- Songwriters: Nikki Sixx; James Michael; DJ Ashba; Scott Stevens
- Producer: Sixx:A.M.

Sixx:A.M. singles chronology
"Pray for Me" (2008)	"Tomorrow" (2008)	"Accidents Can Happen" (2008)

"Tomorrow" is the third single by Los Angeles–based band Sixx:A.M. It reached #33 on the U.S. Hot Mainstream Rock Tracks, not quite matching the #29 success of the previous single, "Pray for Me". This song is also featured in the soundtrack to the film Saw IV.

== Track listing ==
No.	Title	Length
1.	"Tomorrow"	4:05
