= Prayers for the Blessed =

Prayers for the Blessed, Vol. 2

Studio album by Sixx:A.M.
- Released: November 18, 2016
- Genres: Hard rock, alternative metal
- Length: 46:38
- Label: Eleven Seven Music
- Producer: James Michael

Sixx:A.M. chronology
Prayers for the Damned (2016)	Prayers for the Blessed, Vol. 2 (2016)	Hits (2021)

Singles from Prayers for the Blessed
- 1. "We Will Not Go Quietly" Released: October 17, 2016; 2. "Maybe It's Time" Released: August 22, 2020

Professional ratings
Review scores
Source	Rating
Allmusic	3/5 stars
Classic Rock	3/5 stars

Prayers for the Blessed (referred to as Prayers for the Blessed, Vol. 2 on its album cover) is the fifth and final studio album by American rock band Sixx:A.M. It is the second half of the Prayers for the Damned/Blessed double album. The first half, Prayers for the Damned, was released seven months earlier.

== Track listing ==
All tracks are written by DJ Ashba, James Michael and Nikki Sixx, except for track 8, written by Tom Evans and Pete Ham.

No.	Title	Length
1.	"Barbarians (Prayers for the Blessed)"	5:11
2.	"We Will Not Go Quietly"	4:21
3.	"Wolf at Your Door"	4:10
4.	"Maybe It's Time"	4:22
5.	"The Devil's Coming"	4:55
6.	"Catacombs" (Instrumental)	1:20
7.	"That's Gonna Leave a Scar"	4:11
8.	"Without You" (Badfinger cover)	4:04
9.	"Suffocate"	4:21
10.	"Riot in My Head"	4:46
11.	"Helicopters"	4:57
Total length:		46:38

== Credits ==
- DJ Ashba – lead guitar, composer, backing vocals
- James Michael – lead vocals, keyboards, composer
- Nikki Sixx – bass, composer, backing vocals
- Dustin Steinke – drums
