= This Is Gonna Hurt =

Studio album by Sixx:A.M.
- Released: May 3, 2011
- Recorded: February–July 2010
- Genres: Hard rock, alternative metal
- Length: 48:49
- Label: Eleven Seven Music
- Producer: Sixx:A.M.

Sixx:A.M. chronology
Live Is Beautiful (2008)	This Is Gonna Hurt (2011)	7 (2011)

Singles from This Is Gonna Hurt
- 1. "Lies of the Beautiful People" Released: March 1, 2011; 2. "This Is Gonna Hurt" Released: August 2, 2011; 3. "Are You with Me" Released: April 10, 2012; 4. "Help Is on the Way" Released: July 5, 2012; 5. "Skin" Released: November 29, 2012

This Is Gonna Hurt is the second studio album by Sixx:A.M., a side project of Mötley Crüe bassist Nikki Sixx, released on May 3, 2011. Like the first album which served as a companion soundtrack to Nikki Sixx's first book The Heroin Diaries: A Year in the Life of a Shattered Rock Star, this album is a companion to Sixx's second book, This Is Gonna Hurt: Music, Photography, And Life Through The Distorted Lens Of Nikki Sixx, which was released on April 12, 2011. Unlike its predecessor, This Is Gonna Hurt does not feature any spoken word.

== Release ==
The lead single from the album is "Lies of the Beautiful People" and was released on March 1, 2011. The first single "Lies of the Beautiful People" premiered on Sixx's radio show website "Sixx Sense" on February 16, 2011, and went on sale on March 1. The album was released on May 10, 2011, after being pushed back from a March 22, 2011, release date.

== Reception ==
Professional ratings
Review scores
Source	Rating
AllMusic	2.5/5 stars
Canoe.ca	2.5/5 stars
Melodic.net	4/5 stars
Revolver	4/5 stars
Rolling Stone	2.5/5 stars
Stuff.co.nz	(negative)
Ultimate Guitar Archive	(8.5/10)
Winnipeg Free Press	(mixed)

This Is Gonna Hurt debuted at #10 on the Billboard 200, selling 30,000 copies in its first week of release, and at #1 on the Hard Rock Charts.

== Track listing ==
All lyrics are written by James Michael and Nikki Sixx.

No.	Title	Music	Length
1.	"This Is Gonna Hurt"	Sixx, Michael, DJ Ashba	3:56
2.	"Lies of the Beautiful People"	Sixx, Michael, Ashba, "John 5" William Lowrey	3:58
3.	"Are You with Me Now" (listed on the cover as "Are You with Me")	Sixx, Michael, Ashba	4:02
4.	"Live Forever"	Sixx, Michael, Ashba	4:55
5.	"Sure Feels Right"	Sixx, Michael, Ashba	4:09
6.	"Deadlihood"	Sixx, Michael, Blair Daly	3:15
7.	"Smile"	Sixx, Michael	5:22
8.	"Help Is on the Way"	Sixx, Michael, Ashba	4:18
9.	"Oh My God"	Sixx, Michael, Ashba	5:35
10.	"Goodbye My Friends"	Sixx, Michael, Daly	5:57
11.	"Skin"	Michael, Daly	3:22
12.	"Codependence" (Japanese bonus track)	Sixx, Michael, Ashba	3:37
Total length:			48:49

== Charts ==
Chart (2014)	Peak position
Australian Albums (ARIA)	53
Canadian Albums (Billboard)	14
Finnish Albums (Suomen virallinen lista)	41
Italian Albums (FIMI)	70
Japanese Albums (Oricon)	43
Scottish Albums (Official Charts)	75
Swedish Albums (Sverigetopplistan)	28
UK Albums (Official Charts)	60
UK Rock & Metal Albums (Official Charts)	3
US Billboard 200	10
US Top Hard Rock Albums (Billboard)	1

== Personnel ==
The album's credits and personnel can be obtained from AllMusic.

Sixx:A.M.

- Nikki Sixx – bass guitar, backing vocals
- DJ Ashba – lead guitar, backing vocals
- James Michael – vocals, rhythm guitar, keyboards, drums, strings

Additional personnel

- Meghan "Shahnaz" Kabir – backing vocals

Production

- James Michael – production, engineering, mixing
- Dave Donnelly – mastering
- Kevin Llewellyn – cover painting
- Nikki Sixx – photography
- P. R. Brown – art design, photography
