= Modern Vintage =

Studio album by Sixx:A.M.
- Released: October 7, 2014
- Genres: Post-grunge, hard rock
- Length: 42:16
- Label: Eleven Seven Music
- Producer: James Michael

Sixx:A.M. chronology
This Is Gonna Hurt (2011)	Modern Vintage (2014)	Prayers for the Damned (2016)

Singles from Modern Vintage
- 1. "Gotta Get It Right" Released: August 5, 2014; 2. "Let's Go" Released: September 2014; 3. "Stars" Released: November 17, 2014; 4. "Drive" Released: April 20, 2015

Modern Vintage is the third studio album by American rock band Sixx:A.M.

Modern Vintage peaked at number 20 on the Billboard 200 on October 25, 2014. It topped the Billboard Hard Rock Charts, and reached number 5 on the Billboard Rock charts.

== Background ==
About the album, vocalist James Michael stated "It was exciting for us, because this is the first record where we didn't have an outside, kind of, peripheral thing, like a book or photography, to base it on. And we did that very intentionally... We wanted to find out who we had become as a band, and in order to do that, what we did is we went back and looked at all of the records that had inspired us over the years — Queen, ELO, Elton John, and Bowie and all of those artists. And when you look at their careers, they were all very song-based; all of those records were very song-based, very performance-based. And that's the spirit in which we wanted 'Modern Vintage' to be made."

== Reception ==
Professional ratings
Review scores
Source	Rating
AllMusic	4/5 stars
Metal Injection	4/5 stars
Pure Grain Audio	4/5 stars

In a positive review, Stephen Thomas Erlewine of AllMusic stated "The versatility of Modern Vintage -- it's undeniably anchored in classic hard rock sounds but feels restless in its cage -- is also a tip-off that Nikki Sixx is now pouring his creative energies into this band, not Mötley Crüe.... that kinetic crack is why Modern Vintage packs a real kick.

== Track listing ==
No.	Title	Length
1.	"Stars"	3:50
2.	"Gotta Get It Right"	3:12
3.	"Relief"	4:20
4.	"Get Ya Some"	3:27
5.	"Let's Go"	4:20
6.	"Drive" (The Cars cover)	4:30
7.	"Give Me a Love"	4:03
8.	"Hyperventilate"	3:40
9.	"High on the Music"	3:39
10.	"Miracle"	3:20
11.	"Before It's Over"	3:52
Total length:		42:16

Digital deluxe edition
No.	Title	Length
12.	"Before It's Over (Piano Ballad)"	3:05
13.	"Stars (Cinematic)"	3:14
14.	"Gotta Get It Right (Acoustic)"	3:06
15.	"Let It Haunt You (So Beautiful)"	4:09
Total length:		55:46

Japanese edition bonus track
No.	Title	Length
12.	"Relief (Acoustic)"

== Charts ==
Chart (2014)	Peak position
US Billboard 200	20
US Independent Albums (Billboard)	4
US Top Hard Rock Albums (Billboard)	1
US Top Rock Albums (Billboard)	5
US Indie Store Album Sales (Billboard)	13
Canadian Albums (Billboard)	22
Japanese Albums (Oricon)	41

== Credits ==
- Nikki Sixx – bass guitar, backing vocals
- DJ Ashba – lead guitar, backing vocals
- James Michael – lead vocals, rhythm guitar, piano
- Jeff Fabb – drums
