= Prayers for the Damned =

Prayers for the Damned, Vol. 1

Studio album by Sixx:A.M.
- Released: April 29, 2016
- Genre: Hard rock; alternative metal
- Length: 49:30
- Label: Eleven Seven
- Producer: James Michael

Sixx:A.M. chronology
Modern Vintage (2014)	Prayers for the Damned, Vol. 1 (2016)	Prayers for the Blessed (2016)

Singles from Prayers for the Damned
- 1. "Rise" Released: March 1, 2016; 2. "Prayers for the Damned" Released: July 12, 2016

Prayers for the Damned (referred to as Prayers for the Damned, Vol. 1 on its album cover) is the fourth studio album by American rock band Sixx:A.M. It is the first half of the Prayers for the Damned/Blessed double album. It was followed by the second half, Prayers for the Blessed seven months later.

== Release ==
In July 2015, Nikki Sixx announced that they would release two albums in 2016. On March 1, 2016, the band announced that the title of the first of these two albums would be "Prayers for the Damned" and released its lead single, "Rise". The first album was released on April 29, 2016.

== Reception ==
Professional ratings
Aggregate scores
Source	Rating
Metacritic	71/100
Review scores
Source	Rating
AllMusic	3/5 stars
Classic Rock	3.5/5 stars
Sputnikmusic	3/5

Prayers for the Damned received mixed to positive reviews from critics. On Metacritic, the album holds a score of 71/100 based on 4 reviews, indicating "generally favorable reviews".

== Track listing ==
All tracks are written by DJ Ashba, James Michael and Nikki Sixx.

No.	Title	Length
1.	"Rise"	3:54
2.	"You Have Come to the Right Place"	4:29
3.	"I'm Sick"	4:13
4.	"Prayers for the Damned"	4:40
5.	"Better Man"	4:58
6.	"Can't Stop"	3:34
7.	"When We Were Gods"	5:24
8.	"Belly of the Beast"	3:49
9.	"Everything Went to Hell"	4:40
10.	"The Last Time (My Heart Will Hit the Ground)"	3:45
11.	"Rise of the Melancholy Empire"	6:04
Total length:		49:30

Japanese edition bonus tracks
No.	Title	Length
12.	"Prayers for the Damned (Acoustic)"	4:24
13.	"Rise (Acoustic)"	3:44
Total length:		57:38

== Credits ==
- Nikki Sixx – bass guitar, composer, backing vocals
- DJ Ashba – lead guitar, composer, backing vocals
- James Michael – lead vocals, keyboards, composer
- Dustin Steinke – drums
- Melissa Harding – backing vocals
- Amber Vanbuskirk – backing vocals
- Dave Donnelly – mastering
- Joel Ferber – assistant engineer, music editor

== Charts ==
Chart (2016)	Peak position
Australian Albums (ARIA)	9
Austrian Albums (Ö3 Austria)	70
Belgian Albums (Ultratop Flanders)	60
Belgian Albums (Ultratop Wallonia)	98
Canadian Albums (Billboard)	12
Czech Albums (ČNS IFPI)	48
French Albums (SNEP)	84
German Albums (Offizielle Top 100)	55
Italian Albums (FIMI)	70
Japanese Albums (Oricon)	46
New Zealand Albums (RMNZ)	39
Scottish Albums (OCC)	22
Swedish Albums (Sverigetopplistan)	4
Swedish Hard Rock Albums (Sverigetopplistan)	2
Swiss Albums (Schweizer Hitparade)	26
Swiss Albums (Romandie)	15
UK Albums (OCC)	30
UK Rock & Metal Albums (OCC)	4
US Billboard 200	19
US Top Hard Rock Albums (Billboard)	2
