= Epiphone Blackbird =

The Epiphone Blackbird is the Epiphone Company's variant of the Gibson Thunderbird bass with a couple of differences. It still has the black hardware, a single on/off switch with no volume or tone knobs, a mahogany body with a flat-black finish, the normal Gibson Thunderbird bridge with an "opti grab" handle added, a 1.5" wide nut, and a similar (if not exactly the same) pickguard. The only differences seem to be a hard maple bolt-on neck and the two "deepsixx" humbucker pickups.

This is the signature model of Nikki Sixx of Mötley Crüe's Thunderbird.
