= The Heroin Diaries: A Year in the Life of a Shattered Rock Star =

Book written by Nikki Sixx and Ian Gittins

- Cover, designed by Paul Brown
- Author: Nikki Sixx, Ian Gittins
- Cover artist: Paul Brown
- Language: English
- Genre: Autobiography
- Publisher: Pocket Books
- Publication date: September 18, 2007
- Publication place: United States
- Media type: Print (hardback)
- Pages: 432
- ISBN: 978-0-7434-8628-6
- OCLC: 123115369
- Dewey Decimal: 782.42166/092 B 22
- LC Class: ML419.S614 A3 2007
- Preceded by: The Dirt (2001)
- Followed by: This Is Gonna Hurt (2011)

The Heroin Diaries: A Year in the Life of a Shattered Rock Star is a book co-written by Nikki Sixx, bassist of the rock band Mötley Crüe, and Ian Gittins. Additional reflections on the period from Sixx and others are interspersed throughout the book. The book also includes many black-and-white photographs, lyrics, random thoughts and artwork. The book was designed by Paul Brown, according to page 406. With his other band Sixx:A.M., Sixx recorded a concept album titled The Heroin Diaries Soundtrack as a musical accompaniment for the book. The album was released in 2007.

One quarter of the profits from sales of the book are donated to Running Wild in the Night, a charity initiative for abused and abandoned children.

== Story ==
The book is a 413-page collection of diary entries written from Christmas 1986 to Christmas 1987. In considerable detail, the diaries chronicle the recording of Mötley Crüe's album Girls, Girls, Girls and the subsequent Girls Girls Girls tour, ending with Sixx's near-death from a heroin overdose in late 1987, which inspires the band to quit heroin altogether. Themes include Sixx's relationships with then-girlfriend Vanity, the other members of Mötley Crüe, and his family as well as his drug dependency. Sixx's dark struggles with addiction and depression are leavened by humorous anecdotes about his wild lifestyle at the time.

== Release ==
At Borders in Los Angeles, the book sold out on the day it was released. This was partially because Sixx was holding a book signing at the store. The book debuted at #7 on the New York Times Book Review bestseller list for hardcover nonfiction.

== Album ==
Sixx's band Sixx:A.M. recorded The Heroin Diaries Soundtrack, an album of music inspired by the book. The album was released ahead of the book's publication. It entered the Billboard Independent chart at #7 in August 2007. Some tracks on the album feature spoken word featuring Sixx himself reading some of the book's lines.

== Musical adaptation ==
Sixx's book originally had a musical adaptation inspired by the book. The show was in pre-production when the pandemic happened, which had halted momentum. Before the plans were halted, there were various open calls for the role of Nikki Sixx

== Contributors ==
- Nikki Sixx (bassist and songwriter of Mötley Crüe)
- Tommy Lee (drummer of Mötley Crüe)
- Vince Neil (lead singer of Mötley Crüe)
- Mick Mars (guitarist of Mötley Crüe)
- Deana Richards (Sixx's mother)
- Ceci Comer (Sixx's younger sister)
- Tom Reese (Sixx's maternal grandfather)
- Doc McGhee (former manager of Mötley Crüe)
- Doug Thaler (business partnerto McGhee)
- Vanity (ex of Sixx)
- Tom Zutaut (Elektra Records A&R man)
- Fred Saunders (head of security on Mötley Crüe tours)
- Bob Timmons (drug counselor)
- Slash (lead guitarist of Guns N' Roses and Velvet Revolver)
- Sally McLaughlin (ex-girlfriend of Slash)
- Karen Dumont (Elektra Records employee)
- Bob Michaels (friend and neighbor to Sixx)
- Ross Halfin (British photographer)
- Jason Brice (unpaid assistant to Halfin)
- Bryn Bridenthal (Mötley Crüe publicist)
- Tim Luzzi (Sixx's bass technician)
- Joey Scoleri (record company executive and former radio DJ)
- Wayne Isham (music video director)
- Allen Kovac (current manager of Mötley Crüe)
- Steven Tyler (lead singer of Aerosmith)
- Sylvia Rhone (former CEO of Elektra Records)
- Rick Nielsen (lead guitarist of Cheap Trick)
- Bob Rock (producer of two Mötley Crüe albums)
- James Michael (songwriting partner to Sixx and lead singer for Sixx:A.M.)
- Ian Gittins (co-author of book)
- Ozzy Osbourne (lead singer of Black Sabbath and solo artist)
- Lita Ford (ex-girlfriend of Sixx)
- Alice Cooper (solo artist)
