= Sixx:A.M. =

American hard rock band (2007–2021)

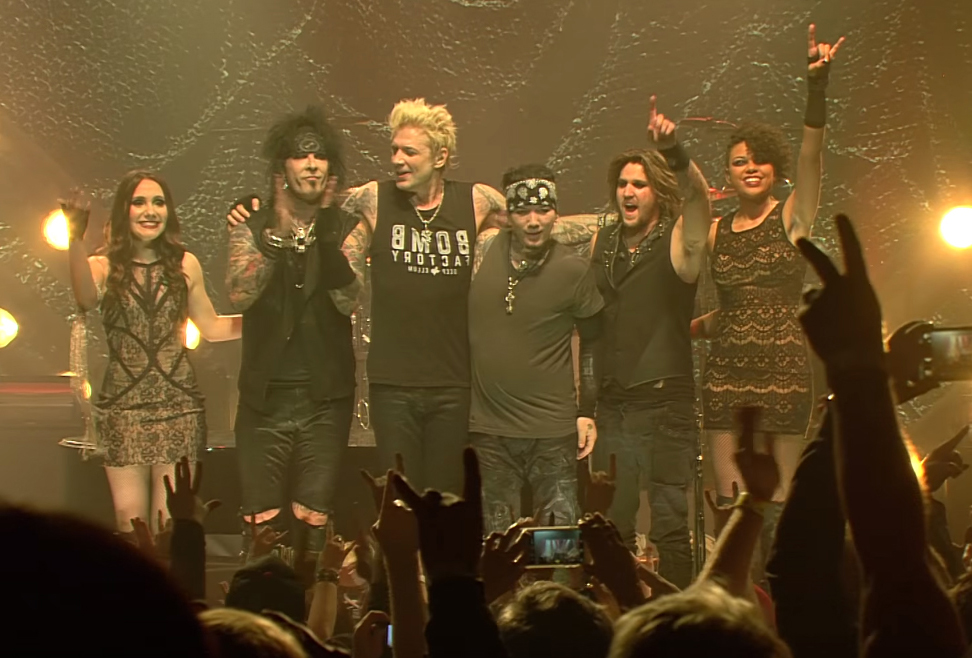
- Sixx:A.M. in 2015. From left to right: Melissa Harding, Nikki Sixx, James Michael, DJ Ashba, Dustin Steinke and Amber Vanbuskirk

Background information
- Origin: Los Angeles, California, U.S.
- Genres: Hard rock; alternative rock; alternative metal
- Years active: 2007–2021
- Label: Eleven Seven Music
- Past members: Nikki Sixx; DJ Ashba; James Michael
- Website: sixxammusic.com

Sixx:A.M. was an American rock band from Los Angeles, formed in 2007 by Nikki Sixx, DJ Ashba, and James Michael, and was a side project of Sixx, who was also at the time bass guitarist for Mötley Crüe. The group is best known for their songs "Life Is Beautiful" and "Lies of the Beautiful People". The name Sixx:A.M. is a combination of all of the members' last names (Sixx, Ashba, Michael).

Sixx:A.M. released five studio albums: The Heroin Diaries Soundtrack (2007), This Is Gonna Hurt (2011), Modern Vintage (2014) Prayers for the Damned and Prayers for the Blessed (both 2016), and three EPs; X-Mas In Hell (2008); Live Is Beautiful (2008), 7 (2011).

== History ==
=== Formation and The Heroin Diaries Soundtrack (2007–2008) ===
The band released The Heroin Diaries Soundtrack in 2007, which is based upon Sixx's autobiography, The Heroin Diaries: A Year in the Life of a Shattered Rock Star.

The band made their live debut at Crash Mansion on July 16, 2007. They performed five songs from the album, The Heroin Diaries Soundtrack. The album had no drummer because lead singer/rhythm guitarist James Michael programmed all the drums. Due to this, there was some curiosity as to who would be playing drums for them live. Former Beautiful Creatures drummer Glen Sobel ended up playing on tour with the band.

On October 25, 2007, Sixx:A.M. played another show opening for Korn. At the time of this show, Glen Sobel was on tour drumming with Elliott Yamin.

Originally the group stated they had no intention of touring. After constant support for the band and interest in a tour, they held a nationwide vote for tour dates. The tour was scheduled to start in spring 2008 but was postponed to the summer due to unforeseeable circumstances.

In 2008, Ashba and Michael assisted Sixx with the writing and recording of Mötley Crüe's studio album Saints of Los Angeles.

On April 15, 2008, Sixx:A.M. announced they would be touring as part of Mötley Crüe's Crüe Fest, along with Buckcherry, Papa Roach and Trapt. The tour began on July 1, 2008, in West Palm Beach, Florida. During Crüe Fest, Papa Roach drummer Tony Palermo served as a touring drummer for the band. A deluxe tour edition of The Heroin Diaries Soundtrack was released on November 25, 2008, which included a bonus live EP entitled Live Is Beautiful which features recorded performances from the band's summer tour.

=== This Is Gonna Hurt and Modern Vintage (2009–2014) ===
Sixx confirmed the work on a follow-up album to The Heroin Diaries Soundtrack in late 2008 after rumors that the band had begun writing for their second studio album during the tour in the summer of 2008.

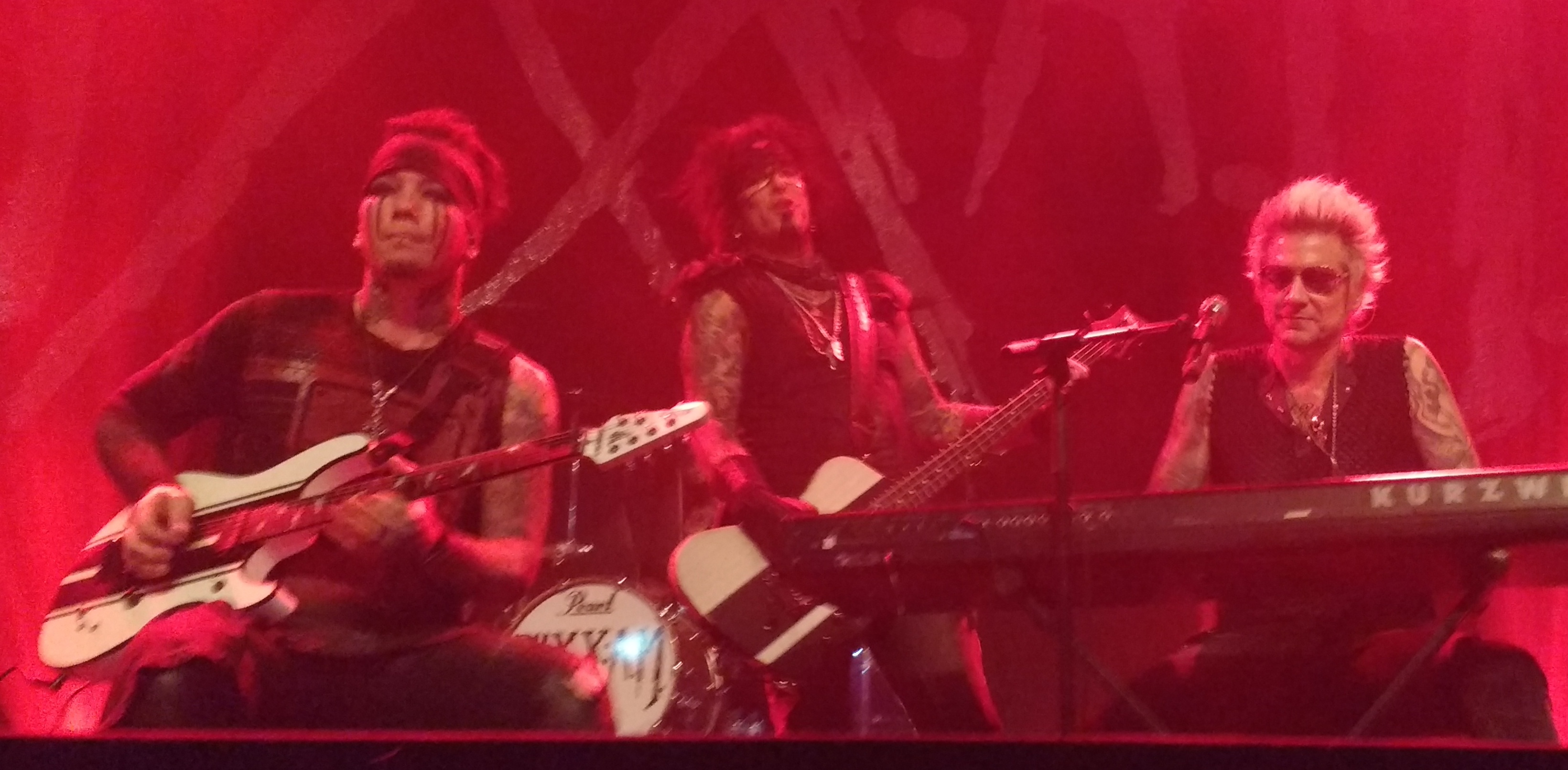
The band in 2016.

In April 2009, both James Michael and Sixx confirmed that the band was in the studio recording new material. Sixx added that the new material was "inspiring. it feels like we may have topped ourselves on this album coming up, and can't wait for you to hear what it sounds like." He also revealed that the new album, like the first, would be a concept album, but refused to reveal more details about the concept. He also added that a "surprise," possibly a new song, might be coming soon and that the album would probably be ready in mid/late 2010.

On February 19, 2010, Sixx revealed that the band was currently in the studio recording the new album, with some guitar tracks by Ashba already laid down, but bass still left to record. Sixx also said that there were over two albums' worth of material written, but as with the first album, it would probably end up being a single album with the best songs chosen so it wouldn't have fillers.

On May 27, 2010, Sixx revealed that all bass tracks for the upcoming album had been recorded and James Michael was reworking the lyrics before recording final vocals. Sixx also said music video director P. R. Brown was writing the treatment for the video for the first single to be released from the album, due in early 2011. On July 23, 2010, Sixx confirmed that the new album had been finished.

On September 4, 2010, it was announced that Sixx would be releasing a book entitled This Is Gonna Hurt, which would be accompanied by an album by Sixx:A.M. Some of the songs on the upcoming album were inspired by the author's photographs, and others inspired photographs of their own, as the book was part photo, part journal. The HarperCollins imprint William Morrow and Company announced that the book would be released on March 22, 2011, accompanied by the album on the same day.

On December 7, 2010, the band uploaded a video preview for the new album on their official website, stating that it would be released in April 2011. On January 3, 2011, another video preview by the band confirmed that the book would be released on April 12, 2011, with the album soon following on May 10, 2011, which was confirmed by Sixx. The lead single "Lies of the Beautiful People" was released on February 25, 2011. On February 15, 2011, Sixx announced through his Twitter and Facebook accounts that the music video for this song would premiere on the website for his radio show Sixx Sense on February 16, 2011. Sixx also announced that due to fan demand, the album's release date had been moved up to May 3, 2011.

On December 5, 2011, lead singer James Michael announced the band would be releasing an acoustic EP entitled 7 on December 13, 2011, featuring seven new acoustic renditions of songs from the band's previous two studio albums. Michael also hinted at an upcoming surprise release from the band.

On April 11, 2012, the band performed live for the first time in four years at the Revolver Golden Gods Awards at Club Nokia in Los Angeles. The band performed only two songs: "This Is Gonna Hurt" and "Are You with Me Now", also filming the music video for the latter at the show.

On November 21, 2012, the band announced via Twitter that they were working on new music.

On July 18, 2013, they released a song called "Relief"' for their third album.

On January 14, 2014, the band announced via its Facebook page that the final song on the next album would be titled "Let it Haunt You (So Beautiful)."

On July 31, 2014, the band announced that the title for their third album would be Modern Vintage. It was released on October 7, 2014.

=== Touring and Prayers for the Damned, Vol. 1 and Prayers for the Blessed, Vol. 2 (2015–2017) ===
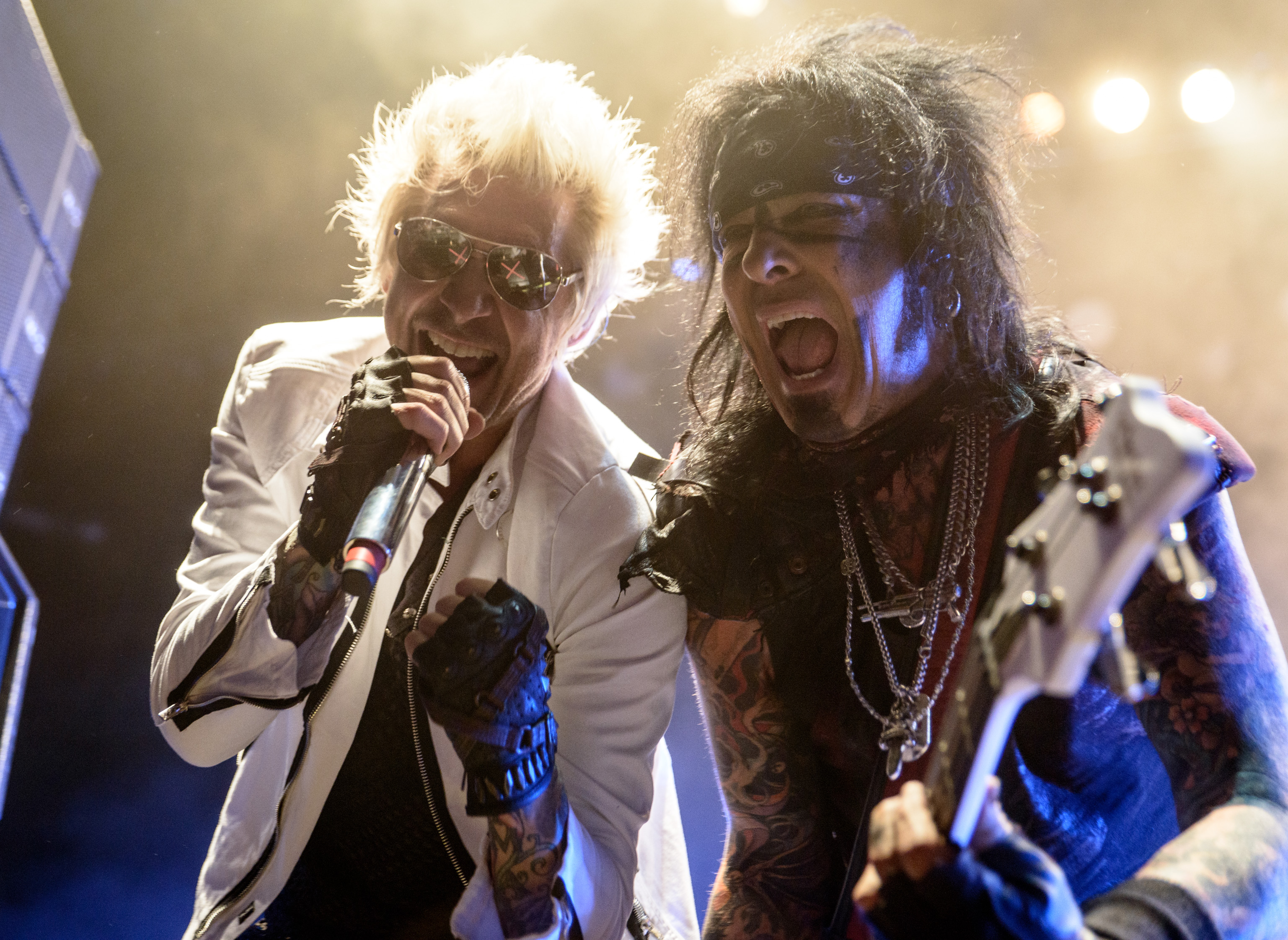
Michael and Sixx in 2016

The band made their Japanese debut at the Nippon Budokan on February 19, 2015, as part of VampPark Fest, hosted by the rock band Vamps.

On April 27, 2015, they performed their 10th live show with a full set at the Best Buy Theater in Times Square, NYC.

In July 2015, Sixx stated that Sixx:A.M. planned to release two new albums and do a worldwide tour in 2016. Also in 2015, Ashba left his other band, Guns N' Roses, to focus solely on Sixx:A.M.

On March 1, 2016, Sixx:A.M released a single called "Rise," the details of the first of their two newly recorded albums, Prayers for the Damned, and dates for a new US tour scheduled to take place during April and May 2016. "Rise" debuted live in an acoustic format with no PA at an invite-only session at the Sanctum Soho Hotel in London, England on February 23 ("Stars" from the Modern Vintage album and "Life Is Beautiful" from The Heroin Diaries Soundtrack were also played). Pre-orders for the album started on March 4, and the album was released on April 29. The second of the two albums is, Prayers for the Blessed, Vol. 2, was released on November 18.

In October 2017, Sixx:A.M. released a tenth anniversary edition of their debut album The Heroin Diaries Soundtrack to commemorate its tenth anniversary and Nikki Sixx's biography of the same name. The re-release additionally contained three re-imagined tracks, including the songs "Life Is Beautiful", "Accidents Can Happen", and "Girl With Golden Eyes".

In February 2018, Michael and Ashba created a new band, Pyromantic, while announcing that Sixx:A.M was on hiatus.

=== HITS and dissolution (2019–2021) ===
In March 2019, Sixx announced the band had recorded four new songs and also announced that they working on a greatest hits album. By September they released their first song in three years, "Talk to Me", in support of the #TalktoMe campaign against opioid addiction.

On August 22, 2020, the band returned with a remix of "Maybe It's Time", featuring various guest artists, for Artists for Recovery, a global recovery initiative. The song is also included on the Sno Babies soundtrack. In August 2021, the band announced their greatest hits album entitled Hits, which would include a radio mix of "Talk to Me" and three unheard songs, along with remixes of two of their past album tracks. It was released on October 22.

In October 2021, Michael said in an interview with Metal On Loud that the band has no plans of touring or writing new material after their hits album will be released. He said, "we never know what we're gonna do in the future, but for now, we're looking at this and saying, 'This [the Hits album] is a good way to wrap this up.'"

== Band members ==
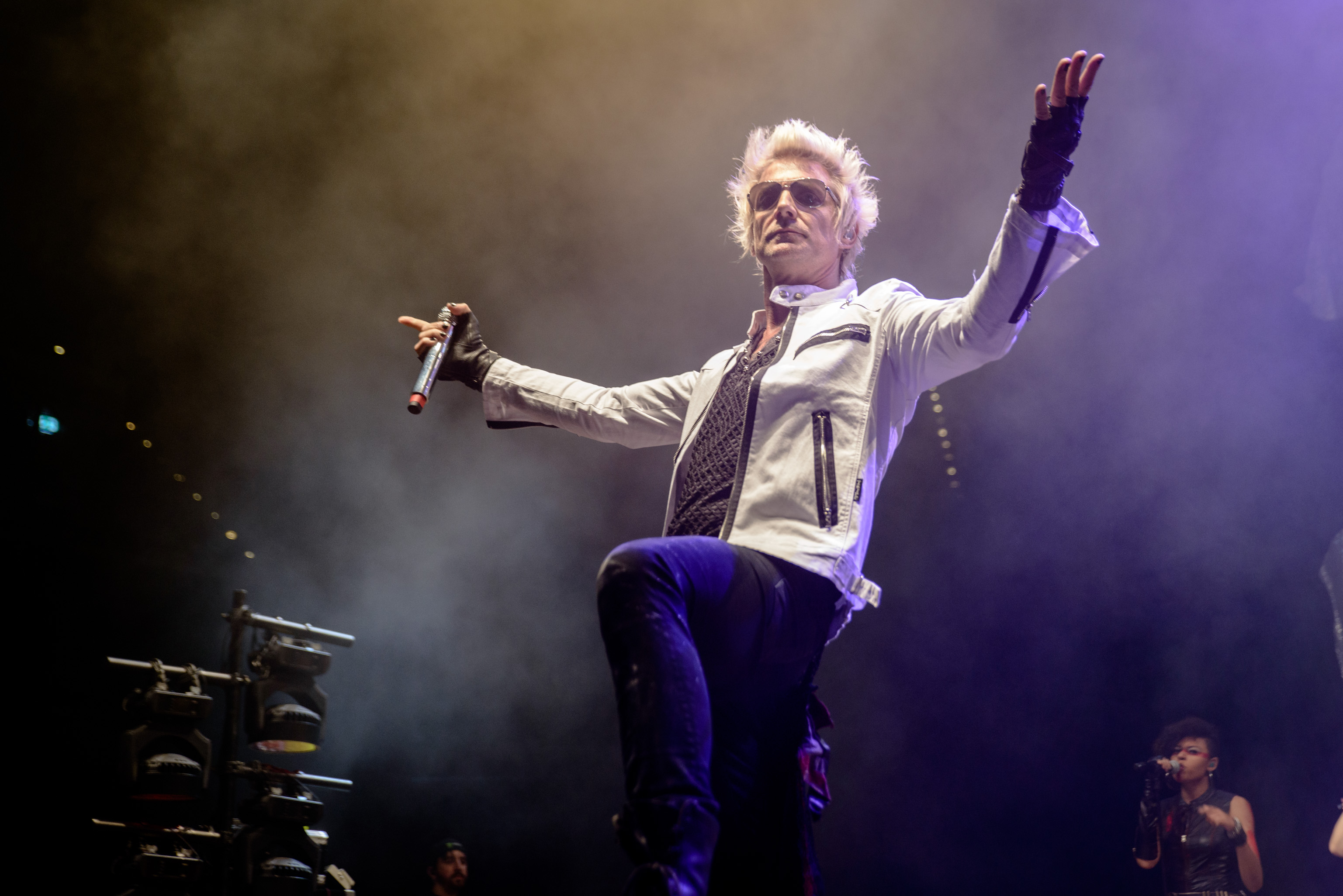
James Michael

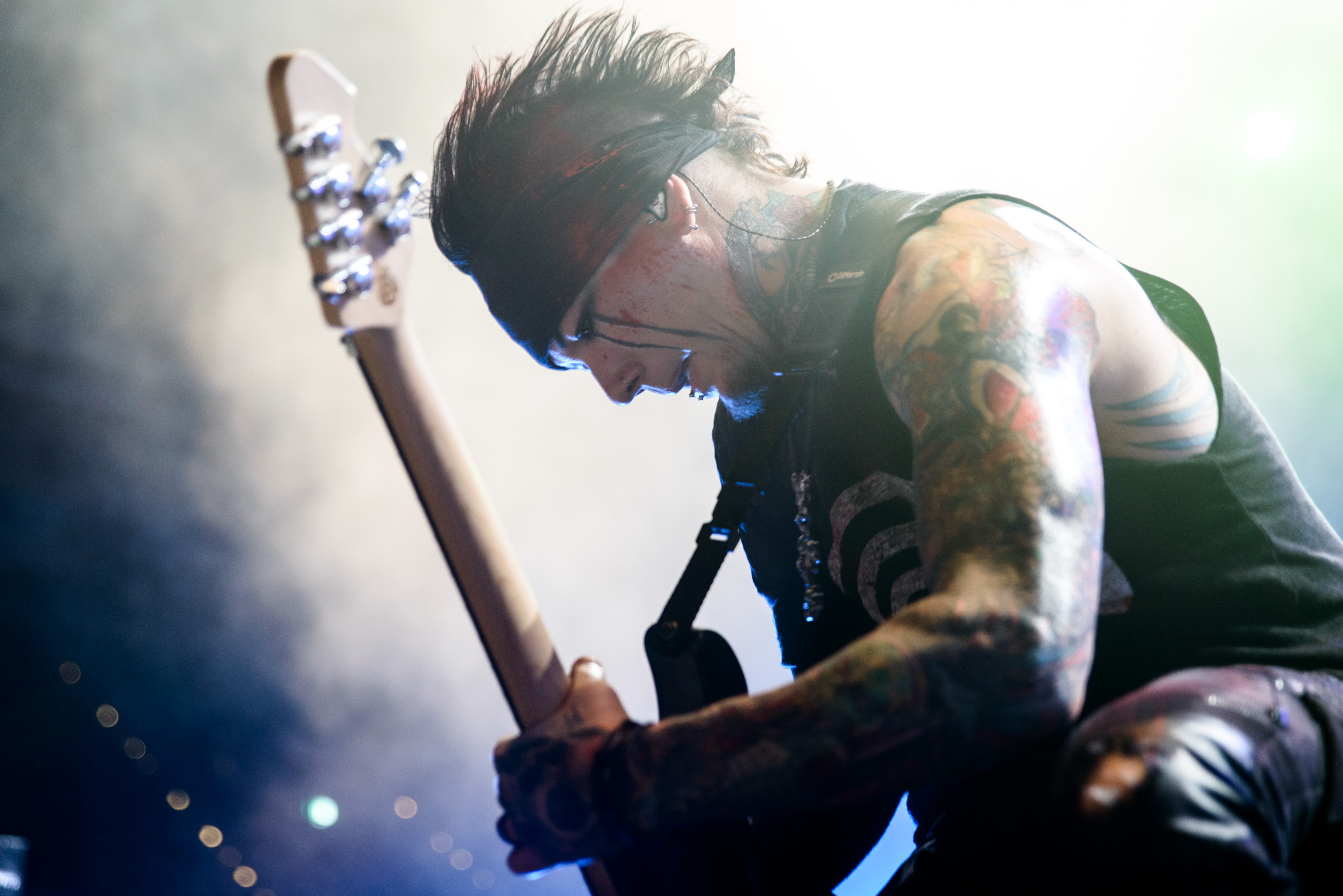
DJ Ashba

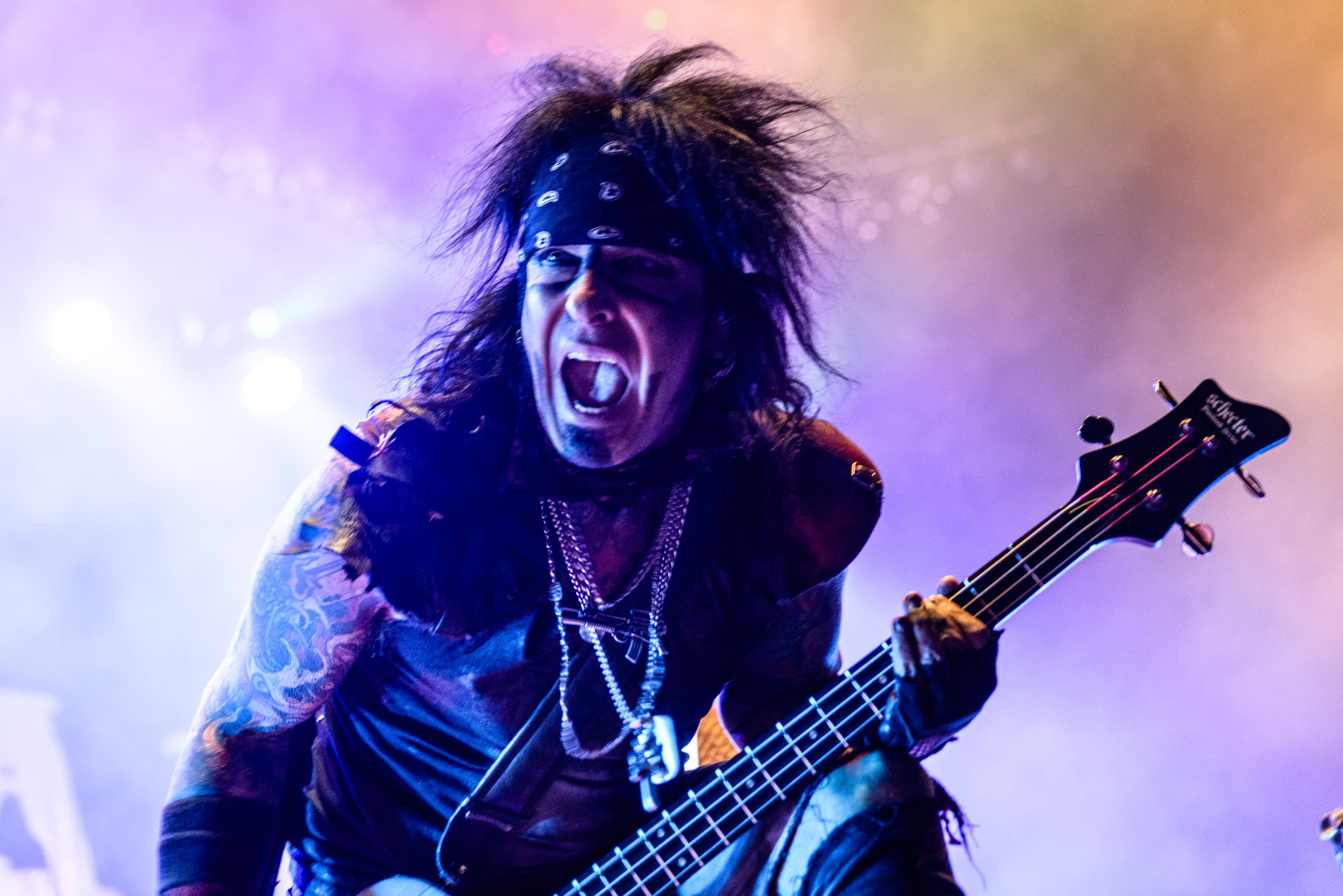
Nikki Sixx

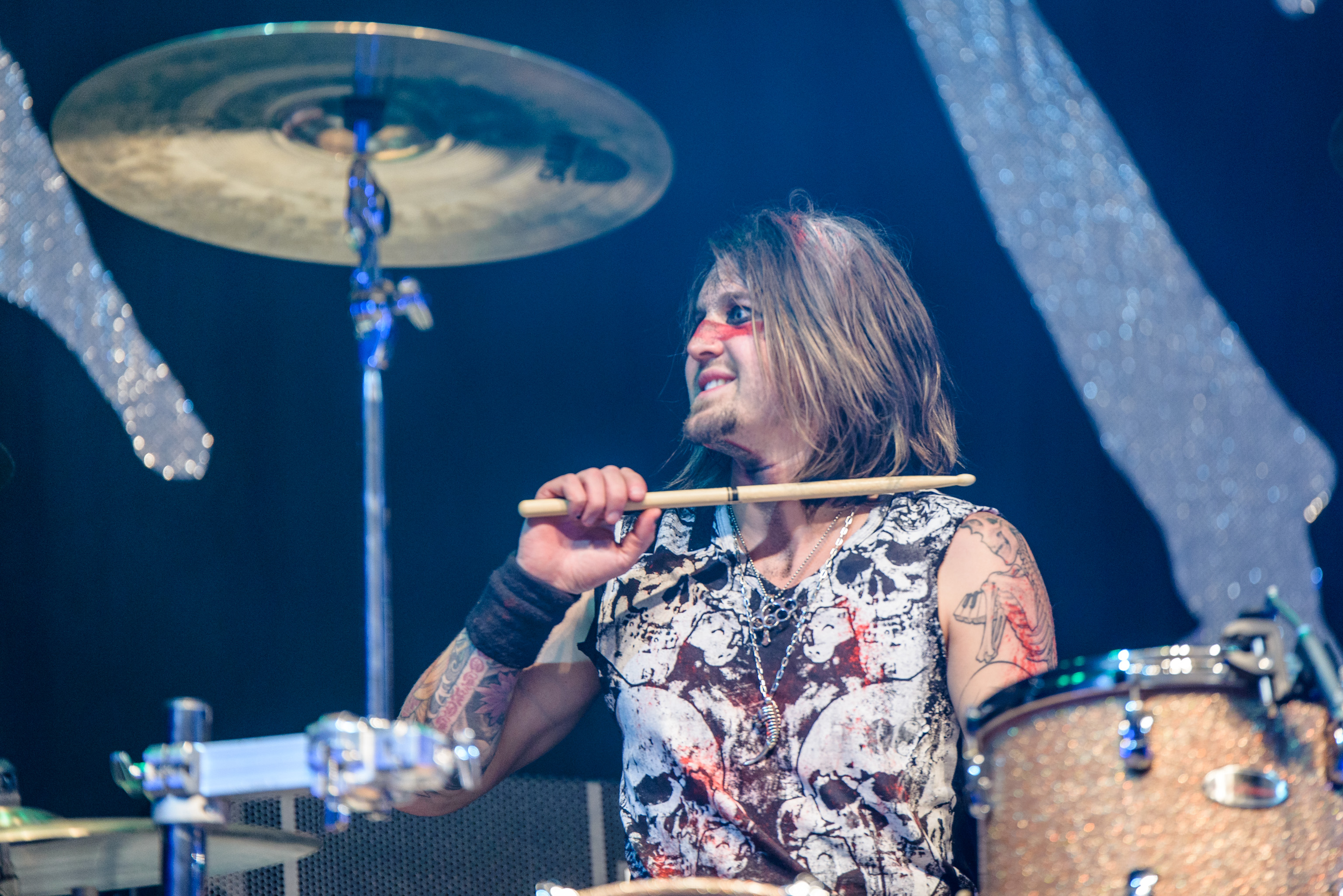
Dustin Steinke

Final lineup

- James Michael – lead vocals, rhythm guitar, keyboards, programming, piano (2007–2021); drums (2007–2011)
- DJ Ashba – lead guitar, backing vocals (2007–2021)
- Nikki Sixx – bass guitar, backing vocals (2007–2021)

Touring members

- Dustin Steinke – drums, percussion (2015–2021)
- Melissa Harding – backing vocals (2014–2021)

Former touring members

- Amber Vanbuskirk – backing vocals (2015–2017)
- Glen Sobel – drums, percussion (2007)
- Tony Palermo – drums, percussion (2008)

Studio musicians

- Jeff Fabb – drums, percussion on Modern Vintage (2014)
- Dustin Steinke – drums, percussion on Prayers for the Damned, Vol. 1 (2016) and Prayers for the Blessed, Vol. 2 (2016)

== Discography ==
Sixx:A.M. discography
- Studio albums: 5
- Extended plays: 3
- Singles: 11
- Video albums: 1

=== Studio albums ===
Year	Album details	Peak chart positions			
Year	Album details	US	AUS	CAN	UK
2007	The Heroin Diaries Soundtrack: Released: August 21, 2007; Label: Eleven Seven Music	26	—	54	70
2011	This Is Gonna Hurt: Released: May 3, 2011; Label: Eleven Seven Music	10	53	14	60
2014	Modern Vintage: Released: October 7, 2014; Label: Eleven Seven Music	20	31	22	69
2016	Prayers for the Damned, Vol. 1: Released: April 29, 2016; Label: Eleven Seven Music	19	9	12	30
2016	Prayers for the Blessed, Vol. 2: Released: November 18, 2016; Label: Eleven Seven Music	37	23	31	85

=== EPs ===
==== Remix ====
Year	Album details
2008	X-Mas In Hell: Released: June 10, 2008; Label: Eleven Seven Music; Format: DI
2011	7: Released: December 13, 2011; Label: Eleven Seven Music; Format: DI

==== Live ====
Year	Album details
2008	Live Is Beautiful: Released: November 25, 2008; Label: Eleven Seven Music; Format: CD

=== Singles ===
Year	Song	Peak chart positions						Certifications	Album
Year	Song	US Bub.	US Main.	US Alt.	CAN	CAN Rock	CZE Rock	Certifications	Album
2007	"Life Is Beautiful"	4	2	25	60	6	—	RIAA: Gold	The Heroin Diaries Soundtrack
2008	"Pray for Me"	—	29	—	—	—	—		The Heroin Diaries Soundtrack
2008	"Tomorrow"	—	33	—	—	—	—		The Heroin Diaries Soundtrack
2008	"Accidents Can Happen"	—	—	—	—	—	—		The Heroin Diaries Soundtrack
2011	"Lies of the Beautiful People"	—	1	31	—	6	13		This Is Gonna Hurt
2011	"This Is Gonna Hurt"	—	8	—	—	41	—		This Is Gonna Hurt
2012	"Are You with Me Now"	—	32	—	—	—	—		This Is Gonna Hurt
2014	"Gotta Get It Right"	—	12	—	—	—	8		Modern Vintage
2014	"Stars"	—	6	—	—	31	—		Modern Vintage
2015	"Drive"	—	—	—	—	—	—		Modern Vintage
2016	"Rise"	—	3	—	—	7	2		Prayers for the Damned, Vol. 1
2016	"Prayers for the Damned"	—	12	—	—	—	—		Prayers for the Damned, Vol. 1
2016	"We Will Not Go Quietly"	—	13	—	—	49	3		Prayers for the Blessed, Vol. 2
2019	"Talk to Me"	—	—	—	—	—	—		Hits
2020	"Maybe It's Time" (new version featuring Joe Elliott, Brantley Gilbert, Ivan Moody, Slash, Corey Taylor, Awolnation and Tommy Vext)	—	12	—	— (Note: "Maybe It's Time" did not enter the Billboard Canadian Hot 100, but peaked at number 45 on the Canadian Digital Song Sales chart.)	—	12		Sno Babies soundtrack
2021	"The First 21"	—	—	—	—	35	—		Hits

=== Promotional singles ===
- "Help Is On the Way"
- "Skin"
- "Let's Go"
- "You Have Come to the Right Place"
- "Barbarians (Prayers for the Blessed)"
- "Without You"
- "Life is Beautiful 2017"

=== As Featured Artists ===
- Thousand Foot Krutch - We Are (2024) (The End Is Where We Begin Reignited)

=== Music videos ===
Year	Song	Album	Director	Link
2007	"Life Is Beautiful"	The Heroin Diaries	P. R. Brown	
2008	"Accidents Can Happen"	The Heroin Diaries	P. R. Brown	
2008	"Pray for Me"	The Heroin Diaries	P. R. Brown	
2008	"Tomorrow"	The Heroin Diaries	P. R. Brown	
2011	"Lies of the Beautiful People"	This Is Gonna Hurt	P. R. Brown	
2011	"This Is Gonna Hurt"	This Is Gonna Hurt		
2012	"Are You with Me"	This Is Gonna Hurt		
2014	"Gotta Get It Right"	Modern Vintage	P. R. Brown	
2014	"Stars"	Modern Vintage		
2016	"We Will Not Go Quietly"	Prayers for the Blessed, Vol. 2	Wayne Isham	
2020	"Talk To Me"	Hits		
2020	"Maybe It's Time"	Prayers for the Blessed, Vol. 2	Ben Guzman	

=== Video albums ===
Year	Album details
2009	Crüe Fest: Released: March 24, 2009; Label: Mötley Records, Eleven Seven Music; Format: DVD
