= DJ Ashba =

American musician (born 1972)

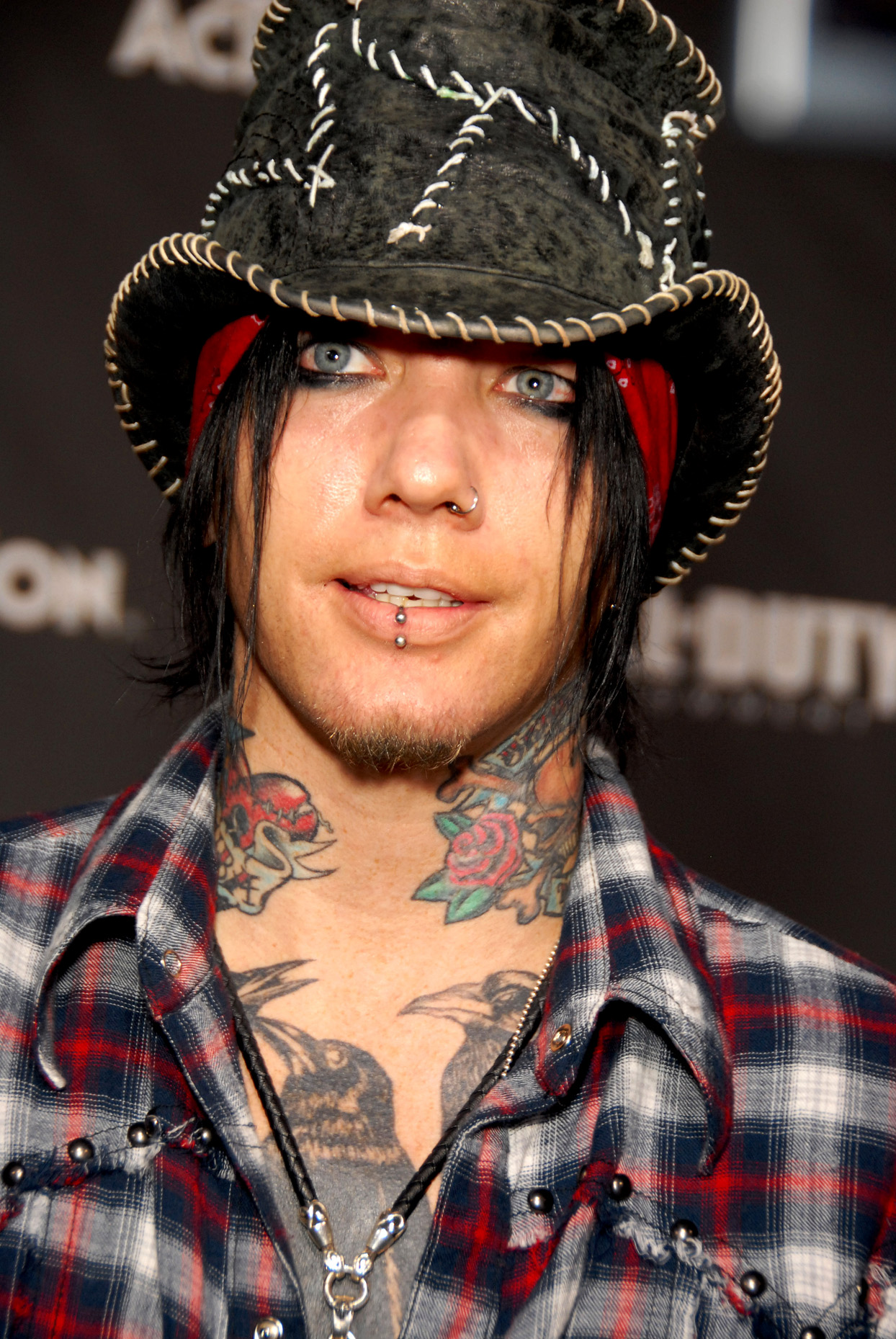
- Ashba, November 2010

Background information
- Also known as: Ashba
- Born: Daren Jay Ashba; November 10, 1972 (age 53); Monticello, Indiana, U.S.
- Genres: Alternative metal; hard rock; heavy metal; post-grunge
- Occupations: Guitarist; songwriter; record producer; graphic designer
- Instruments: Guitar; vocals
- Years active: 1987–present
- Labels: Eleven Seven; Warner Bros.
- Member of: Ashba
- Formerly of: BulletBoys; Beautiful Creatures; Sixx:A.M.; Guns N' Roses
- Website: djashba.com

Daren Jay Ashba (born November 10, 1972) is an American musician, guitarist, songwriter, record producer, and graphic designer. He was the lead guitarist of Sixx:A.M. He is also known for his work with hard rock bands BulletBoys, Beautiful Creatures, and Guns N' Roses. He has worked with various artists including Mötley Crüe, Drowning Pool, Marion Raven, Aimee Allen, and Neil Diamond.

== Biography ==
=== Early life ===
Ashba was born in Monticello, Indiana. He was raised in Fairbury, Illinois. His mother was a classically trained pianist who began teaching him about music as a toddler. Ashba performed in his first piano recital at the age of five, where he played Beethoven's "Ode to Joy". His next ambition was to learn the drums. He built kits out of garbage cans and pots and pans, until he finally acquired a real set at the age of six. When he was eight, he took a job detasseling corn in the fields to earn enough money to buy his first guitar out of the Sears catalog. He would ride to his job in the corn fields on the bus with a guitarist from a local band, who would teach him a new chord each day on a fretboard that they had carved into the back of a bus seat with a pocket knife. For his 16th birthday, his father took him to his first concert: Mötley Crüe's Girls, Girls, Girls Tour. He later said, "The crowd, the music, the lights! It was the night I realized that no matter what it takes, I was gonna be on that stage one day." At the age of 18, he packed up his possessions and moved to Hollywood to begin his career.

=== Solo, BulletBoys (1991–1999) ===
Eventually, he joined the group Barracuda and toured with the band for two years. In 1996, he released his debut instrumental album, Addiction to the Friction. In 1998, Ashba joined BulletBoys as part of the band's new lineup. It was during his time with the band that he met Joe Lesté of Bang Tango. In 1999, he departed the group to start a new band with Lesté, piecing together the band that would become Beautiful Creatures.

=== Beautiful Creatures (2000–2002) ===
After partnering with bassist Kenny Kweens, Ashba and Lesté hired session drummer Anthony Focx to become the group's second guitarist and Glen Sobel, another session drummer, was brought in to take over drums. This was the first lineup under the moniker Beautiful Creatures. Prior to naming, the band opened one show in Detroit, Michigan, for Kiss during their farewell tour after Ted Nugent pulled out. The band then signed with Warner Bros. and released their self-titled debut Beautiful Creatures, produced by Marilyn Manson cohort Sean Beavan, on August 14, 2001. Album track "1 A.M." was featured in the soundtrack for the 2001 horror film Valentine and TV series Smallville. "Ride" was featured on the soundtrack to the 2002 remake of Rollerball. Despite appearing at Ozzfest as part of the Rolling Rock Tour, the band was dropped from their label due to poor album sales. On February 13, 2002, the band announced that Ashba had left the group and the band found a replacement and continued on.

=== Solo (2003–2006) ===
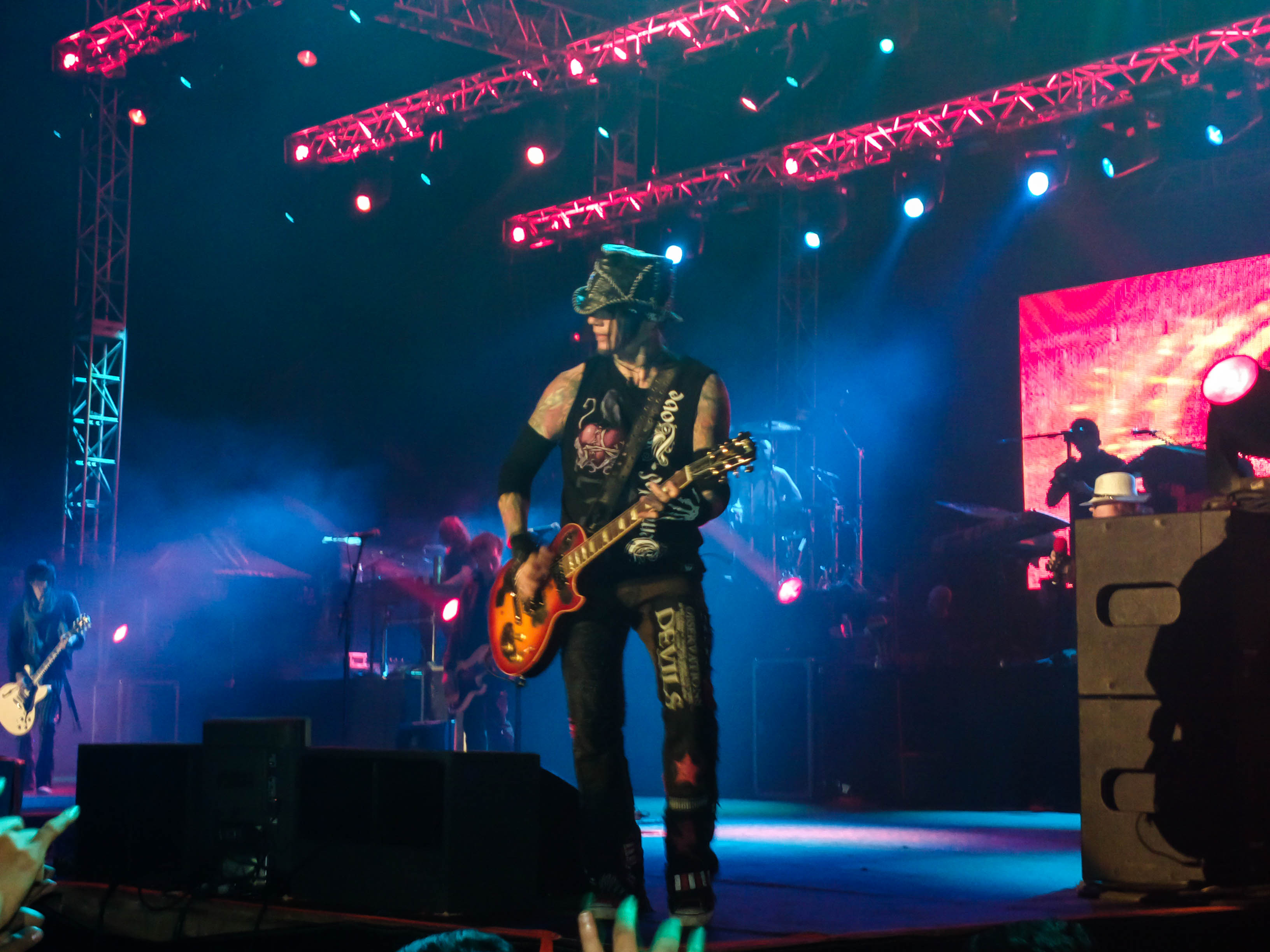
Ashba with Guns N' Roses during a concert in Bangalore

After his departure from Beautiful Creatures, he formed another solo band, ASHBA, with Bones Elias, bassist John Younger, and former Tuff guitarist Michael Thomas, who was Ashba's replacement in Beautiful Creatures before leaving the group in 2003. Also in 2003, Ashba was invited to participate in the group Brides of Destruction with Nikki Sixx and Tracii Guns but turned it down to focus on his solo project. In 2005, a small controversy was caused when it was suggested that neither Tommy Lee nor Mick Mars played on the new tracks for Mötley Crüe's compilation album Red, White & Crüe; duties were supposedly handled by Vandals drummer Josh Freese and Ashba as well as Mick being replaced by Ashba on their reunion tour. Ashba hit back at the rumors:

Just want to set the record straight. As much as I would love to play on tour with Mötley, it's simply not true...it's a rumor. I'll be in the studio and playing shows with ASHBA. I have all the respect in the world for Mötley Crüe and I can't wait to see Mick kick ass, as always.

=== Sixx:A.M. and Guns N' Roses (2007–2016) ===
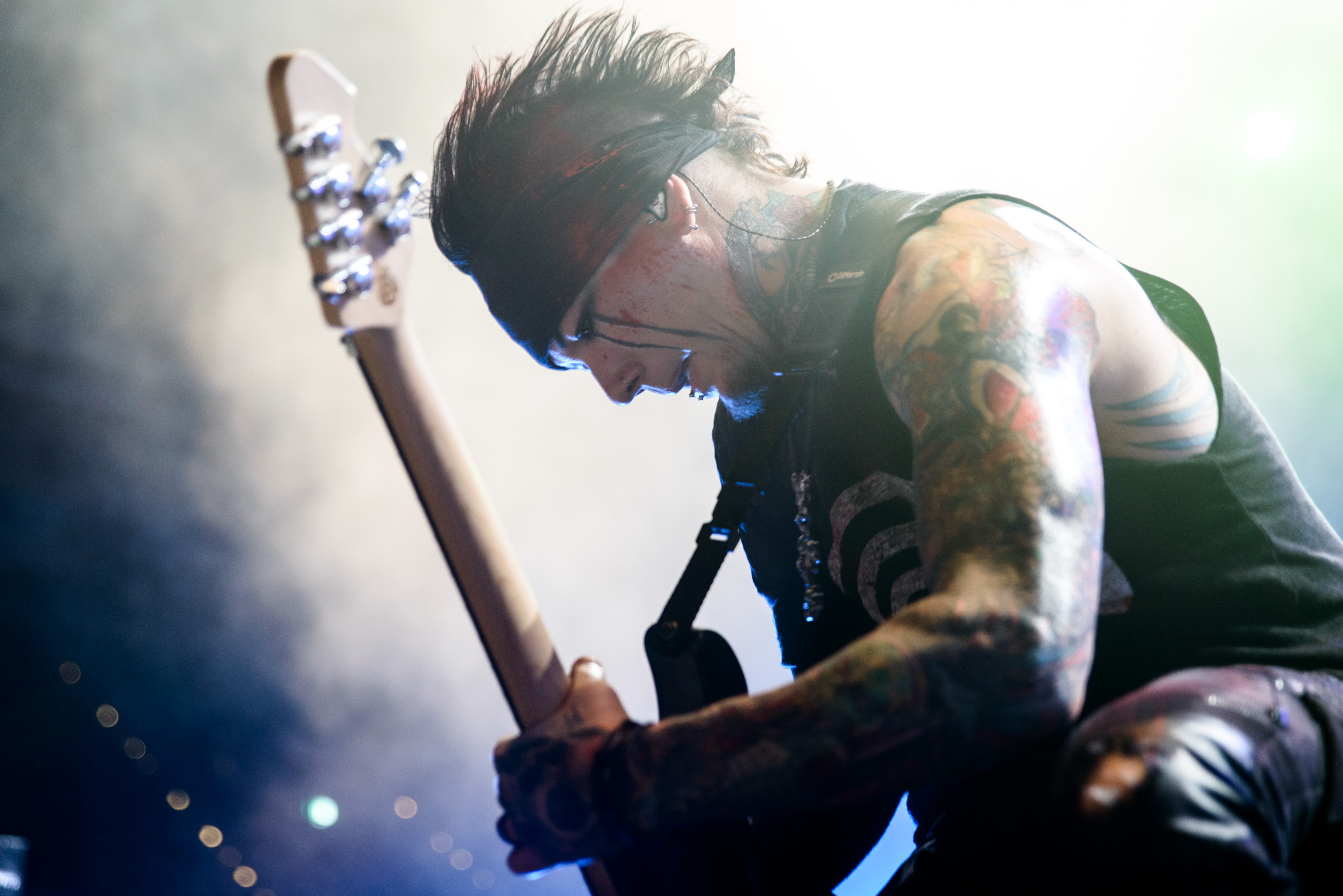
Ashba playing with Sixx:A.M. in 2016

In 2006 Ashba had set up Funny Farms Studios with Nikki Sixx. They began writing and producing, and performing music together which included collaborations with singer Marion Raven, whom Sixx had worked with before, on her Heads Will Roll EP and album Set Me Free. James Michael also is credited on the albums. In March 2007, Sixx penned "Reason I'm Alive" for Drowning Pool's new album Full Circle with both Sixx and Ashba co-producing the track.

Ashba released the critically acclaimed album The Heroin Diaries Soundtrack after collaborating with Mötley Crüe bassist Nikki Sixx and producer James Michael under the name Sixx:A.M. in August, 2007 serving as a soundtrack to Sixx's autobiography The Heroin Diaries: A Year in the Life of a Shattered Rock Star. The single "Life is Beautiful" reached #2 on the Billboard Hot Mainstream Rock Tracks. Originally the group stated they had no intention of touring. After constant support for the band and interest in a tour, they held a nationwide vote for tour dates. The tour was scheduled to start in spring 2008, but had been postponed to the summer due to unforeseeable circumstances. On April 15, 2008, Sixx:A.M. announced they would be touring as part of Mötley Crüe's Crüe Fest, along with Buckcherry, Papa Roach and Trapt. The tour began on July 1, 2008, in West Palm Beach, Florida. During Crüe Fest, Papa Roach drummer Tony Palermo served as a touring drummer for the band. A deluxe tour edition of The Heroin Diaries Soundtrack was released on November 25, 2008, which included a bonus live EP entitled Live Is Beautiful which features recorded performances from the band's summer tour. In April 2009, both James Michael and Nikki Sixx confirmed that the band was in the studio, recording new material. Sixx added that the new material is "inspiring. it feels like we may have topped ourselves on this album coming up, and can't wait for you to hear what it sounds like."

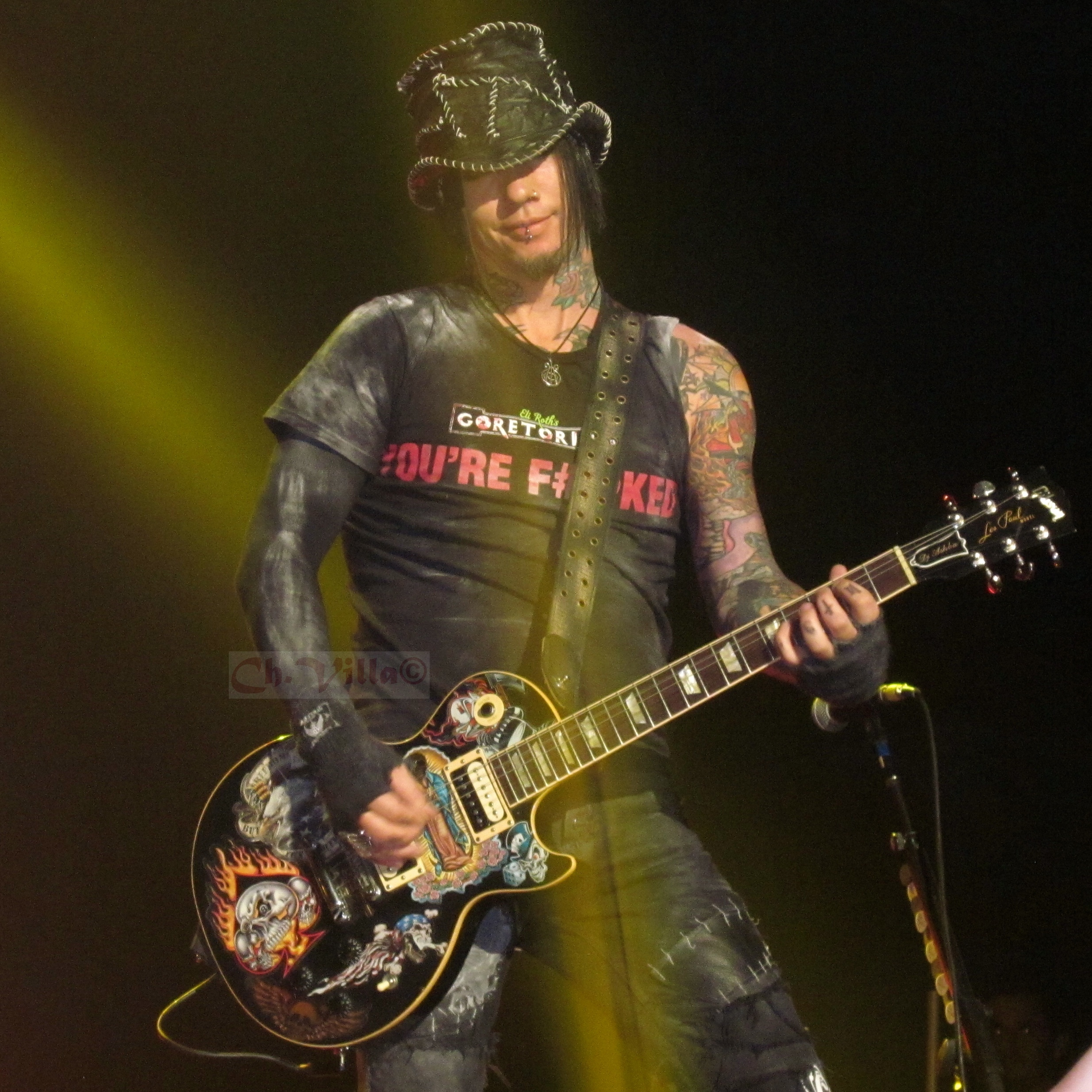
Ashba performing with Guns N' Roses in 2013

On March 23, 2009, Ashba was announced as the new lead guitarist of Guns N' Roses replacing Robin Finck, who had left the band to rejoin Nine Inch Nails. He first toured with the band as part of the Chinese Democracy Tour where on December 11, 2009, Guns N' Roses played in Taiwan, and continued with the band for the next five years.

On May 3, 2011, the Sixx:A.M. album This Is Gonna Hurt was released, followed by Modern Vintage in 2014, and their first headlining tour in the spring of 2015.

After balancing Sixx:A.M. and Guns N' Roses duties for years, and only appearing on the Appetite for Democracy 3D video release for the latter band, Ashba announced on July 27, 2015, that he was leaving the band, citing his commitment to his family and his other band. The statement read "I have reached a point in my life where I feel it's time to dedicate myself to my band Sixx:A.M., my adoring wife and family, and to the many new adventures that the future holds for me."

After leaving Guns N' Roses, Sixx A.M. released two albums in 2016, Prayers for the Damned and Prayers for the Blessed, before embarking on a world tour. Subsequent to the tour the group entered a hiatus, confirmed by Ashba and James Michael in February 2018.

=== Return to solo work and Sixx:A.M. reunions (2017-present) ===
In February 2018 Ashba and James Michael announced a collaborative project called Pyromantic, focused on mixing rock with pop and dance influences. By the following year Michael had exited the project.

In 2019 Sixx A.M. reunited to record and release the charity single "Talk to Me", and announced the impending release of several other tracks recorded for a greatest hits album.

By 2020 the Pyromantic project had evolved into a resurrection of the ASHBA name, now a solo project, with the release of the singles "Hypnotic", "Let's Dance", and "A Christmas Storm". The following year he released the cover single "Bella Ciao".

In 2021 Sixx A.M. released Greatest Hits, which featured three new songs. James Michael subsequently said that it was "a good way to kind of wrap of Sixx:A.M.'s body of work", while not ruling out future reunions.

=== Other work ===
Ashba owns two corporations, Ashba Media, Inc. and Ashbaland Inc. In 2003, he founded Ashba Media, Inc. This creative agency was announced the Agency of Record for Virgin Entertainment. AMI designs the look and feel of every Virgin Megastore. They also have other clients, such as Ovation guitars, Royal Underground and many more. Ashba contributed to Mötley Crüe's 2008 album Saints of Los Angeles penning all tracks with the exception of "This Ain't a Love Song". The title track "Saints of Los Angeles" was nominated for a Grammy the same year.

== Equipment ==
Guitars

- Schecter Guitar Research. As of 2016, now uses his own Schecter DJ Ashba signature model from the Schecter USA Custom Shop.
- Ernie Ball Music Man Axis guitars
- Gibson Les Paul guitars

Amps

- Mesa Boogie Dual Rectifier 100W heads, feeding Line 6 Spider Valve 412VS 240W 4X12 Guitar Speaker Cabinet Straight, loaded with Celestion Vintage 30s
- Two modified Line 6 POD pro amp modules - Line 6 Vetta HD and Vetta HD II Heads

Pedals

- Morley Dj Ashba Skeleton Wah Pedal
- Digitech Whammy Pitch-Shifting Guitar Effects Pedal
- GCX Ground Control PRO Midi Controller
- Ernie Ball 6166 Mono Volume Pedal,

== Personal life ==
Ashba married Nathalia Ashba (née Henao) on September 23, 2013, after one year of dating. In 2013, three Las Vegas police officers took Ashba and Henao on a ride in a police helicopter, ending with Ashba proposing marriage to Henao. The three police officers involved were punished by the department for improper and unauthorized use of a police vehicle. One officer retired in anticipation of demotion, one was transferred and the pilot was banned from flying for the metro police department. In February 2023, it was announced Ashba and Henao would be divorcing after nine years of marriage.

In 2024, Ashba was reported to be in a relationship with Kerri Kasem.

== Discography ==
=== Solo ===
- Addiction to the Friction (1996)
- Songs for the Demented Mind (2012)

=== With Beautiful Creatures ===
- Beautiful Creatures (2001)

=== With Guns N' Roses ===
- Appetite for Democracy 3D (2014)

=== With Sixx:A.M. ===
- The Heroin Diaries Soundtrack (2007)
- Live Is Beautiful (2008)
- This Is Gonna Hurt (2011)
- 7 (2011)
- Modern Vintage (2014)
- Prayers for the Damned (2016)
- Prayers for the Blessed (2016)

=== Production, songwriting and guest credits ===
Year	Album title	Band	Record label	Credits
2002	I'd Start a Revolution If I Could Get Up in the Morning	Aimee Allen	Elektra Unreleased	Guitars on "Revolution"
2003	Welcome to Blue Island	Enuff Z'Nuff	Perris Records	Guitars on "87 Days"
2003	Outlaw Volleyball	Original soundtrack	Sumthing Distribution	Composer, Primary Artist on "Feel This" and "Who Am I"
2005	Heads Will Roll EP	Marion Raven	Eleven Seven	Co-writer "Spit You Out"
2007	Set Me Free	Marion Raven	Eleven Seven/Warner Bros.	Co-writer "Set Me Free" and "Thank You For Loving Me"
2007	Full Circle	Drowning Pool	Eleven Seven	Co-producer on "Reason I'm Alive"
2007	The Heroin Diaries Soundtrack	Sixx:A.M.	Eleven Seven	Co-writer and producer
2007	Saints of Los Angeles	Mötley Crüe	Eleven Seven/Universal Music Group	Co-writer on all tracks except "This Ain't a Love Song"
2009	A Cherry Cherry Christmas	Neil Diamond	American, Columbia	Writer on "Meditations on a Winter (instrumental)"
2009	Whatever Gets You Off	The Last Vegas	Eleven Seven	Co-producer
2011	This Is Gonna Hurt	Sixx:A.M.	Eleven Seven	Co-writer and producer
2011	Memories of a Beautiful Disaster	James Durbin	Wind-Up Records	Co-writer "Crawling Home"
2014	Modern Vintage	Sixx:A.M.	Eleven Seven Music	Lead Guitar, Backing Vocals
2016	Prayers for the Damned	Sixx:A.M.	Eleven Seven Music	Lead Guitar, Composer, Backing Vocals
2016	Prayers for the Blessed	Sixx:A.M.	Eleven Seven Music	Lead Guitar, Composer, Backing Vocals
2021	The Body Remembers	Debbie Gibson	StarGirl Records	Guitars on "Legendary", "Freedom", and "What Are We Gonna Do?"
