= Nikki Sixx =

American musician (born 1958)

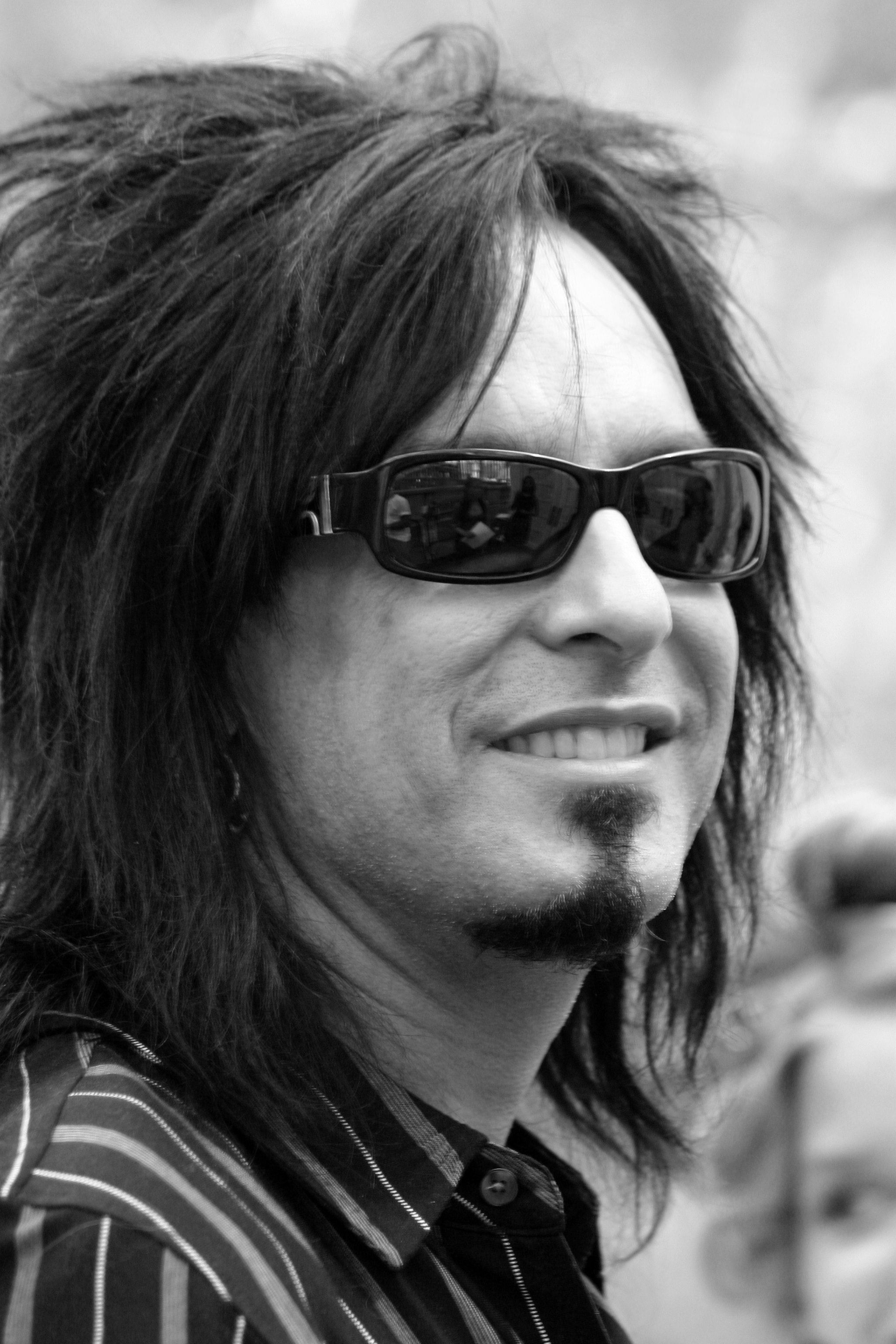
- Sixx in September 2007

Background information
- Born: Frank Carlton Serafino Feranna Jr. December 11, 1958 (age 67); San Jose, California, U.S.
- Genres: Heavy metal; hard rock; glam metal; alternative metal
- Occupations: Musician; songwriter; radio personality; record producer; author; photographer
- Instruments: Bass guitar; keyboards; vocals
- Years active: 1975–present
- Labels: Eleven Seven; Elektra; Mötley; Sanctuary; Leathür; Warner Music Group; Beyond
- Member of: Mötley Crüe
- Formerly of: Sixx:A.M.; Brides of Destruction; 58; London; Sister; L.A. Rats
- Website: nikkisixx.net

Nikki Sixx (born Frank Carlton Serafino Feranna Jr.; December 11, 1958) is an American musician, songwriter, record producer, author, photographer, and radio personality, best known as the co-founder, bassist, primary songwriter, and only constant member of the heavy metal band Mötley Crüe. Prior to forming Mötley Crüe, Sixx was a member of Sister before going on to form London with his Sister bandmate Lizzie Grey. In 2000, he formed side project group 58 with Dave Darling, Steve Gibb and Bucket Baker, issuing one album, Diet for a New America. Also in 2002, he formed the hard rock supergroup Brides of Destruction with L.A. Guns guitarist Tracii Guns. Formed in 2006, initially to record an audio accompaniment to Sixx's autobiography The Heroin Diaries: A Year in the Life of a Shattered Rock Star, his side band Sixx:A.M. featured songwriter, producer, and vocalist James Michael and guitarist DJ Ashba.

Sixx has also worked as a songwriter and/or producer for a number of artists and groups, such as Sex Pistols' guitarist Steve Jones, Lita Ford, Alice Cooper, Meat Loaf, Marion Raven, Drowning Pool, Saliva, and The Last Vegas, among others.

Sixx launched the clothing line "Royal Underground" in 2006 with Kelly Gray, formerly the co-president and house model of St. John. Initially the label concentrated on men's clothing before expanding into women's apparel. In 2010, Premiere Radio Networks launched the nationally syndicated rock/alternative music radio programs Sixx Sense and The Side Show Countdown, both of which were based in Dallas, Texas and hosted by Sixx and Jenn Marino.

== Early life ==
Frank Carlton Serafino Feranna Jr. was born on December 11, 1958, in San Jose, California. He was also raised in San Jose. He is of Italian descent on his father's side, from Calascibetta, Sicily. Sixx was partially raised by his single mother, Deana Richards, and by his grandparents after his father left the family. Feranna later moved in with his grandparents after his mother abandoned him. Feranna relocated several times while living with his grandparents. Feranna's uncle, husband of Deana's sister Sharon, is Don Zimmerman, producer and president of Capitol Records. Feranna had one full biological sister (born with Down syndrome; died circa 2000) and has one half-brother and a half-sister.

Feranna grew up listening to Deep Purple, Harry Nilsson, the Beatles, the Rolling Stones, Elton John, Queen, and Black Sabbath; he later discovered T. Rex, David Bowie, and Slade. While living in Jerome, Idaho, Feranna's youth was troubled; he became a teenage vandal, broke into neighbors' homes, shoplifted, and was expelled from school for selling drugs. His grandparents sent him to live with his mother, who had moved to Seattle. Feranna lived there for a short time and learned how to play the bass guitar, having bought his first instrument with money gained from selling a guitar he had stolen.

== Career ==
=== Early career, Sister, London (1975–1979) ===
At the age of 17, Feranna moved to Los Angeles and worked menial jobs such as working at a liquor store and selling vacuum cleaners over the phone while he auditioned for bands. He eventually joined the band Sister, led by Blackie Lawless, after answering an ad in The Recycler for a bass player. Soon after recording a demo, Feranna was fired from Sister along with bandmate Lizzie Grey.

Feranna and Grey formed the band London soon afterward, in 1978. During this time, Feranna legally changed his name to Nikki Sixx. After a number of lineup changes, London added former Mott the Hoople singer Nigel Benjamin to the group, and recorded a 16-track demo in Burbank. After the departure of Benjamin, along with the failure to find a replacement, Sixx departed London. The group would go on to feature Sixx's former Sister bandmate Blackie Lawless (later of W.A.S.P.), Izzy Stradlin (then of Hollywood Rose, later of Guns N' Roses) and drummer Fred Coury (later of Cinderella). In 2000, a number of the London demos recorded with Sixx were included on London Daze by Spiders & Snakes, led by former London guitarist Lizzie Grey.

=== Mötley Crüe (1981–present) ===
In 1981, Sixx founded Mötley Crüe alongside drummer Tommy Lee. They were later joined by guitarist Mick Mars through an ad in the local newspaper, and singer Vince Neil, with whom Lee had attended high school. The band self-recorded their debut album, Too Fast for Love, which was subsequently released in November 1981 on the band's own Leathür Records label. After signing with Elektra Records, they re-released the same album. The band then went on to record and release Shout at the Devil, raising the band to national fame. They issued three more albums during the 1980s, Theatre of Pain in 1985, Girls, Girls, Girls in 1987, and Dr. Feelgood in 1989. The latter ended up being their most successful record, staying in the charts for 114 weeks after its release. The duo of Sixx and Lee are called the "Terror Twins".

During his time with Mötley Crüe, Sixx became addicted to heroin. He is quoted in The Heroin Diaries as saying: "Alcohol, acid, cocaine... they were just affairs. When I met heroin it was true love." He estimates he overdosed "about half a dozen times". On December 23, 1987, Sixx overdosed on heroin and was reportedly declared clinically dead for two minutes before a paramedic revived him with two syringes full of adrenaline.

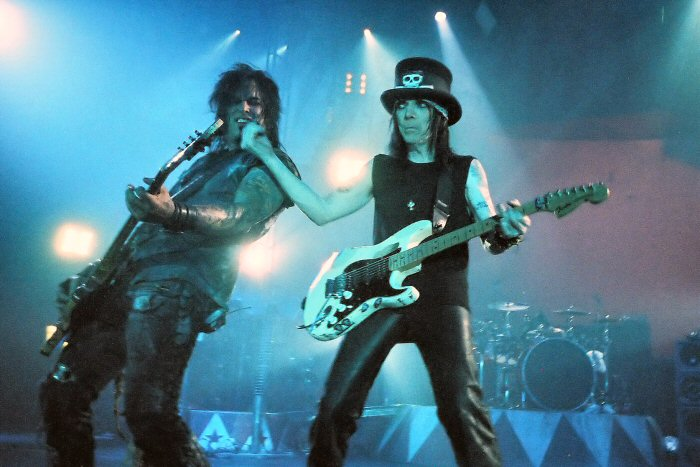
Nikki Sixx and Mick Mars performing onstage with Mötley Crüe, on June 14, 2005, in Glasgow, Scotland

After releasing the compilation album Decade of Decadence in 1991, Neil left the group, and was replaced by John Corabi, who formerly served with The Scream. They released one self titled album with Corabi, in 1994, before firing him in 1996. Afterwards, they reunited with Neil, with whom they released Generation Swine in 1997.

In 1999, Tommy Lee left the group to form Methods of Mayhem. He was replaced by former Ozzy Osbourne drummer Randy Castillo, with whom they released the album New Tattoo in 2000. The group went on hiatus soon afterward before reuniting in 2004, during which Sixx declared himself sober. A 2001 autobiography entitled The Dirt packaged the band as "the world's most notorious rock band". The book made the top ten on The New York Times Best Seller list and spent ten weeks there.

In 2006, Mötley Crüe completed a reunion tour, featuring all four original members, and embarked on a co-headlining tour with Aerosmith, called The Route of All Evil. In April 2008, the band announced the first Crüe Fest, a summer tour, that featured Sixx's side project Sixx:A.M., Buckcherry, Papa Roach and Trapt. On June 24, 2008, Mötley Crüe released their ninth studio album, Saints of Los Angeles, with Sixx credited as either writer or co-writer on all tracks.

Sixx wrote most of Mötley Crüe's material, including tracks such as "Live Wire", "Home Sweet Home", "Girls, Girls, Girls", "Kickstart My Heart", "Wild Side", "Hooligan's Holiday" and "Dr. Feelgood". In the 1990s, all four members began contributing to the material on the albums.

Netflix released The Dirt biopic based on the book of the same name that coincided with an 18-song soundtrack on March 22, 2019. Following the success of the movie and a new generation of fans, Mötley Crüe and Def Leppard announced The Stadium Tour in 2020. Due to Covid delays, the tour started on June 16, 2022, in Atlanta, GA at Truist Park Stadium and ended on November 14, 2023, at Marvel Stadium in Melbourne, Australia. The tour was massively successful selling out stadiums across 5 continents, North and Latin America, Europe, Australia and Japan.

In October 2024, the band released the “Cancelled” EP via Big Machine Label Group featuring three new songs, the bands first new music since 2019. This EP release coincided with Mötley Crüe's return to the Sunset Strip in Hollywood, CA for the Höllywood Takeöver - 3 historic club shows at The Troubadour, Roxy, and Whisky A Go Go - during which the band raised $350K to benefit Covenant House and support the fight to end youth homelessness through Mötley Crüe's Give Back Initiative.

In 2025, Mötley Crüe returned to Las Vegas for their third residency, the first in more than a decade, following 2 successful sold-out runs of Mötley Crüe Takes On Sin City (2012) and Evening In Hell (2013). The Las Vegas Residency 2025, at Dolby Live at Park MGM consisted of 10 exclusive performances from September 12 to October 3, 2025.

=== 58 (2000) ===
In 2000, Sixx formed the internet-based side project 58 with producer Dave Darling, guitarist Steve Gibb (formerly of Black Label Society and Crowbar) and drummer Bucket Baker. They released one single, titled "Piece of Candy", and their debut album, Diet for a New America, also in 2000 through Sixx's Americoma label and Beyond Records. The group did not tour, and was described by Sixx as "strictly an artistic thing."

=== Brides of Destruction (2002–2004) ===
Brides of Destruction were formed by Sixx and Tracii Guns in Los Angeles 2002 initially with the name Cockstar after Mötley Crüe went on hiatus and Guns left L.A. Guns. Sixx also invited former Beautiful Creatures guitarist DJ Ashba to join the group however he declined to focus on his solo band, ASHBA. Ashba would eventually join Sixx in Sixx:A.M.

After a few lineup changes, that included Sixx's former Mötley Crüe bandmate John Corabi, keyboardist Adam Hamilton and drummer Kris Kohls of Adema, the group was composed of Sixx, Guns, singer London LeGrand and drummer Scot Coogan formerly of Ednaswap and Annetenna.

They were advised by radio programmers that the name Cockstar would not be announced on air. They briefly adopted the moniker Motordog before settling on Brides of Destruction.

They entered the studio with producer Stevo Bruno to begin recording what would become Here Come the Brides. The Brides played their first show opening for Mudvayne and Taproot on November 14, 2002, at the Ventura Theatre in California.

After signing a deal with Sanctuary Records, the group released Here Come the Brides in 2004, with the album debuting at number 92 on the Billboard 200 selling over 13,000 copies. A tour of the US, Europe, including an appearance at Download Festival in the United Kingdom, and Australia followed.

On October 25, 2004, it was announced that the group were to go on hiatus while Sixx reunited with Mötley Crüe for a reunion tour. The group continued without Sixx, however, with Guns adding former Amen bassist Scott Sorry to the group as Sixx's replacement. The second Brides of Destruction album, titled Runaway Brides, released in 2005 featured three songs co-written by Sixx during the Here Come the Brides sessions.

=== Sixx:A.M. (2006–2017) ===
Sixx formed his own group Sixx:A.M. in 2006, to record an audio accompaniment to his memoir The Heroin Diaries: A Year in the Life of a Shattered Rock Star, with friends producer/songwriter James Michael and guitarist DJ Ashba (Guns N' Roses, formerly of Beautiful Creatures and BulletBoys). They recorded and released The Heroin Diaries Soundtrack in August 2007 through Eleven Seven. The single, "Life Is Beautiful", received a high ratio of radio and video play peaking at number 2 on the Mainstream Rock Tracks.

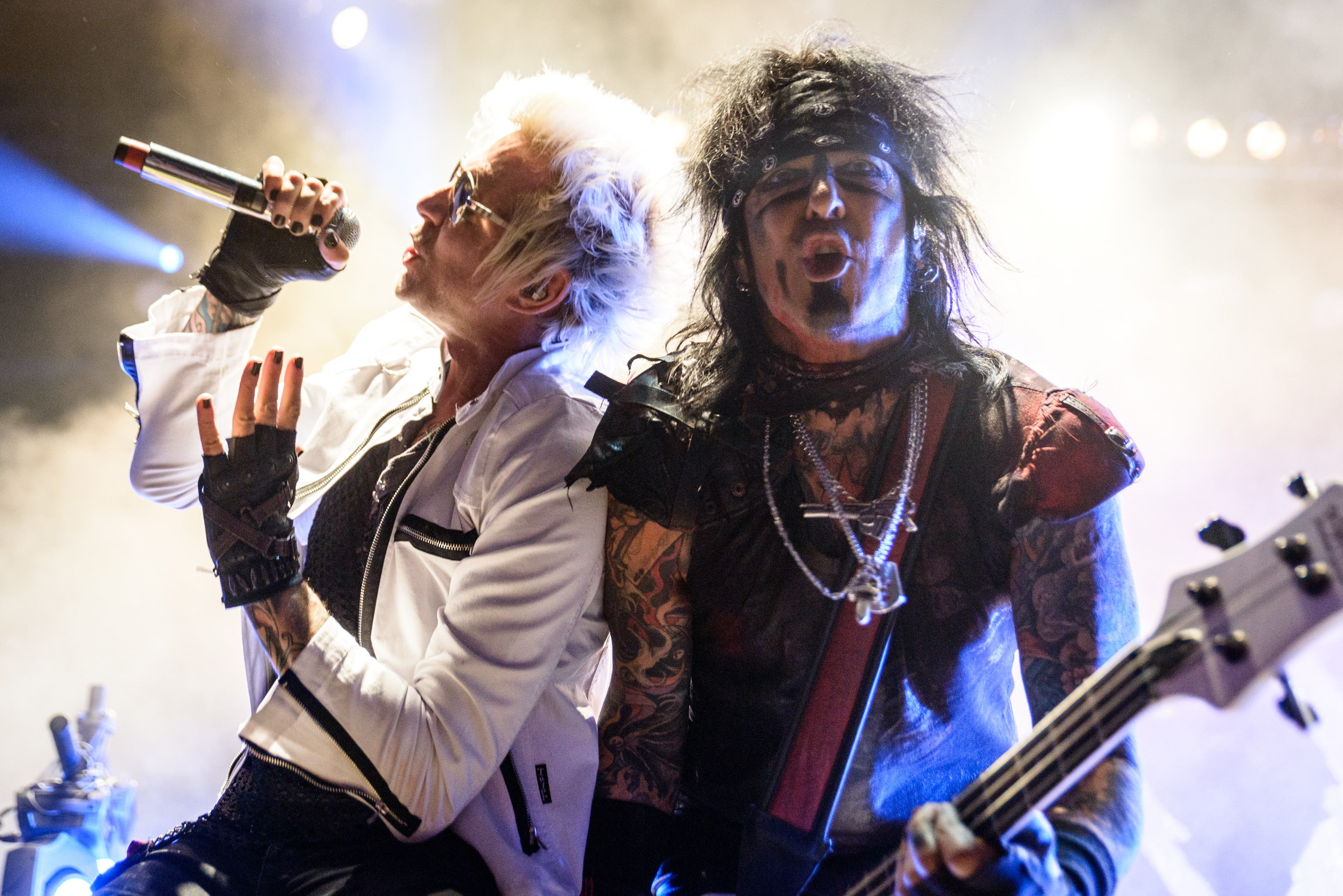
Sixx (right) performing as part of Sixx:A.M. with James Michael in 2016

The band made their live debut at the Crash Mansion on July 16, 2007. They performed five songs from the album, with former Beautiful Creatures drummer Glen Sobel filling in on the drums. On April 15, 2008, Sixx:A.M. announced they would be touring as part of Mötley Crüe's Crüe Fest. The tour began on July 1, 2008, in West Palm Beach, Florida. During Crüe Fest, Papa Roach drummer Tony Palermo served as a touring drummer for the band. A deluxe tour edition of The Heroin Diaries Soundtrack was released on November 25, 2008, which included a bonus live EP entitled Live Is Beautiful, which features recorded performances from the band's summer tour.

In April 2009, both Sixx and Michael confirmed that the band was in the studio, recording new material. Sixx added that the new material was "inspiring. it feels like we may have topped ourselves on this album coming up, and can't wait for you to hear what it sounds like."

In 2010, the group continued recording the album with plans to release it by the late 2010/early 2011 with the group bringing in Paul R. Brown to shoot the video for the album's first single. During an interview in July 2010, Sixx stated that the album was almost finished. This Is Gonna Hurt, the band's second studio album, was released on May 3, 2011. A third studio album, Modern Vintage, was released in 2014. Prayers for the Damned and Prayers for the Blessed were released in 2016.

The band went on hiatus in 2017, with other members DJ Ashba and James Michael forming a new band, Pyromantic.

In 2021, the band released a greatest HITS album to coincide with Nikki's fourth novel, THE FIRST 21.

In 2025, nearly a decade after the original release, a deluxe version of “Prayers for the Damned” and “Prayers for the Blessed” was released, featuring both albums together with brand-new renditions of “Maybe It’s Time” (Piano Version), “Prayers for the Damned” (Piano Version), and an alternative mix of “We Will Not Go Quietly."

== Other work ==
In 1989, Sixx was a featured guest artist on the album Fire and Gasoline by Steve Jones, formerly of the Sex Pistols. Sixx co-wrote and performed on the song, "We're No Saints". In 1991, Sixx played bass on "Feed My Frankenstein" on Alice Cooper's Hey Stoopid album. Sixx co-wrote the track "Die For You", along with Cooper and Mötley Crüe guitarist Mick Mars. In 2002, Sixx played on Butch Walkers first solo album "Left of Self Centered". In 2005, he collaborated with the Norwegian singer Marion Raven on two songs, "Heads Will Roll" and "Surfing the Sun", for Raven's debut album, Here I Am. A new version of "Heads Will Roll" appeared on Raven's 2006 EP Heads Will Roll and on her 2007 U.S. debut album, Set Me Free. In 2006, he was one of the songwriters for Meat Loaf's long-awaited album, Bat Out of Hell III: The Monster Is Loose.

In September 2007, Sixx released a book titled The Heroin Diaries: A Year in the Life of a Shattered Rock Star, a collection of his journal entries from 1986 and 1987 (when his heroin addiction was at its most dangerous). Written with British journalist Ian Gittins, it presents the present-day viewpoints of his bandmates, friends, ex-lovers, caretakers, business associates and family as they respond to specific passages. The book debuted and peaked at No. 7 on The New York Times Best Seller list. Along with Big & Rich (John Rich and Big Kenny Alphin), and James Otto, Sixx co-wrote "Ain't Gonna Stop" for Otto's 2008 Sunset Man CD on Warner Bros/Raybaw Records.

In May 2021, it was announced that Sixx along with Rob Zombie, John 5, and Tommy Clufetos formed a supergroup called L.A. Rats. Their debut track, "I've Been Everywhere", is from the soundtrack to the Liam Neeson film The Ice Road.

In 2023, Sixx was featured on Dolly Parton's studio album Rockstar, playing bass on the song "Bygones".

Dolly Parton also appeared on the 2025 version of Mötley Crüe's song "Home Sweet Home" feat. Dolly Parton to commemorate the song's 40th Anniversary.

== Equipment ==
=== Signature bass guitars ===
Sixx is most often seen playing Gibson Thunderbird bass guitars. Between 2000 and 2003, Gibson produced the Nikki Sixx Signature Blackbird. The Gibson Blackbird was for all intents and purposes a standard Thunderbird bass, but with a satin black finish, Iron Crosses on the fretboard instead of dots, an Iron Cross behind the classic Thunderbird logo, and Nikki Sixx's 'opti-grab' (a metal loop installed behind the bridge for hooking the little finger onto while playing). What also made this bass guitar interesting was the lack of volume or tone controls, being replaced by a single on/off switch. Although subtle, this helped give this Blackbird more tone and a higher output. This model was discontinued in 2003, but has recently been put back in production as the Epiphone Nikki Sixx Blackbird. Cosmetically the Epiphone Blackbird is identical to the Gibson original, but with a bolt-on single ply neck, solid mahogany body, different pickups and lower grade parts and manufacturing. The Epiphone model still kept the 'opti-grab,' designed and made first by his bass technician Tim Luzzi, and single on/off switch of the Gibson original. In 2008, Gibson announced a 'limited run' new Nikki Sixx signature bass. Like the original it features a neck through design made of mahogany and walnut, with maple 'wings' to form the body. Unlike the original 'Blackbird' bass, a clear 'satin black cherry' finish is given to the instrument, with red 'slash' X's on the 3rd, 5th, 7th and 12th frets. A mirror pickguard is also applied, with a red signature and two X's (6 x's on the whole bass guitar) is also a new addition. Unlike the Gibson Blackbird, the new signature featured volume and tone controls, the 'opti-grab', and an on/off switch.

== Personal life ==
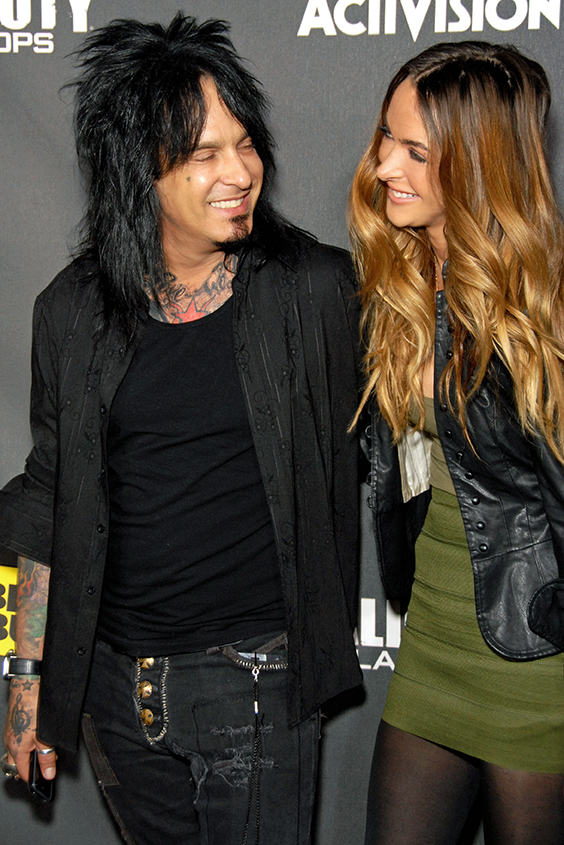
Nikki Sixx and Courtney Bingham in 2010

Nikki Sixx began dating singer Denise "Vanity" Matthews in 1986. They initially planned to marry in December 1987, but the wedding was postponed. Sixx ultimately called off the engagement in 1988. During their relationship, Sixx had a "V" tattooed on his bicep, which he turned into Roman numeral "VI" after their breakup. In his book The Heroin Diaries, he recalls that their bond was driven largely by their shared drug use. Sixx wrote that he viewed her "as a disposable human being, like a used needle." "Vanity also taught me how to really freebase: the first time I based was with Tommy when Mötley just started and only a few times after that. So up until then, I'd been mostly snorting or injecting. But as soon as she showed me the real ins and outs of cooking up a good rock…it was love. Not her. The drug," he said.

From May 1989 to November 1996, Sixx was married to his first wife, Playboy Playmate Brandi Brandt; they have three children: Gunner Nicholas Sixx (born January 25, 1991), Storm Brieann Sixx (born April 14, 1994), and Decker Nilsson Sixx (born May 23, 1995).

One month after the divorce from Brandt, Sixx married his second wife, actress and Playmate of the Month for September 1995, Donna D'Errico. Sixx and D'Errico have one daughter, Frankie-Jean Mary Sixx (born January 2, 2001). D'Errico has a son, Rhyan (born 1993), from a previous relationship. They separated shortly after their daughter's birth, and reconciled months later when Sixx completed rehab. They separated again on April 27, 2006, and divorced in June 2007, with D'Errico claiming irreconcilable differences.

Sixx dated tattoo artist Kat Von D from 2008 to 2010. A few months after their breakup, Sixx and Von D were spotted back together. Sixx was featured on an episode of Von D's reality television show LA Ink in 2008, in which Von D gave him a tattoo of Mick Mars, lead guitarist of Mötley Crüe. On August 25, 2010, Sixx issued a statement that their relationship had dissolved. It was reported on October 19, 2010, that Sixx and Von D had gotten back together. On October 27, 2010 Kat Von D confirmed to USA Today that indeed she and West Coast Choppers owner Jesse James were still together, debunking original reports that she and Sixx had reconciled.

On November 4, 2010, Sixx attended the Call of Duty: Black Ops Launch Party in Santa Monica, California with Courtney Bingham. On November 26, 2012, Nikki revealed to the public that he proposed to Bingham while vacationing in St. Barts. They were married on March 15, 2014.

Bingham gave birth to their first child together, Ruby Sixx on July 27, 2019. Sixx announced the birth through social media.

Sixx practices Transcendental Meditation, as he considers it an important self-help technique.

In 2017, Nikki partnered with Leica Camera for the photography exhibition “Conversation with Angels” at the Leica Gallery in Los Angeles. This exhibit was open from October 4 through November 5 and showcased Sixx' street photography from his travels all over the world.

During an interview with Wall of Sound, Sixx revealed he is working on a children's book with his wife and a coffee table poetry/photography book.

== Radio shows ==
Launched on February 8, 2010, Sixx Sense with Nikki Sixx broadcasts Monday through Friday from 7 p.m. to midnight local time on rock/alternative music stations. Each night, host Nikki Sixx discusses music and lifestyle topics as he gives listeners a backstage look at the world and mind of a rock star. Sixx was joined by co-host Kerri Kasem, from its first episode until March 28, 2014. On April 2, it was announced that radio personality Jenn Marino would be joining the show in Kasem's place. The show is based in Dallas, Texas in a studio in the Northpark Center.

Starting on May 7, 2012, KEGL in Dallas/Fort Worth, Texas moved the show to mornings, making it the only station to carry the show in the mornings at 6 to 10 AM local time instead of the evening's time slot. The show is customized for the Dallas/Fort Worth listeners for broadcast in the mornings on KEGL. Sixx said that bringing Sixx Sense to mornings "has always been our goal. Who better to start your morning with than a rock star and a hot chick? It's a dream come true to have a morning show on one of America's best rock stations." however, one year later, Sixx Sense returned to evenings at KEGL. In addition, recent episodes of "Sixx Sense" air 24/7 on its own iHeartRadio streaming page.

The Side Show with Nikki Sixx is a two-hour original weekend program. Airing Saturday or Sunday between 6 a.m. and midnight local time, Nikki Sixx will air top-charting songs, showcase new and emerging artists, and welcome guests from the worlds of music and entertainment. In October 2017 Sixx announced he would step down from Sixx Sense on December 31, 2017.

== Running Wild in the Night ==
With the formation of Sixx:A.M. and the release of The Heroin Diaries, Nikki Sixx teamed up with an already existing charity known as the Covenant House and created his own branch called Running Wild in the Night. In addition to partially funding the services the Covenant House provides on its own, Sixx's division also provides a creative arts and music program. Sixx has negotiated with people in his industry to provide the program with musical instruments and software.

A Portion of the profits from Sixx:A.M.'s album The Heroin Diaries Soundtrack and his autobiography, The Heroin Diaries: A Year in the Life of a Shattered Rock Star is donated to help the Covenant House. He continues to auction off personal items to fund Running Wild in the Night. As of April 2009, he had raised over $100,000.

== Discography ==
Title	Release	Label	Band
Burbank Demo 1980	1980	none	London
Too Fast for Love	1981	Elektra Records	Mötley Crüe
Shout at the Devil	1983	Elektra Records	Mötley Crüe
Theatre of Pain	1985	Elektra Records	Mötley Crüe
Girls, Girls, Girls	1987	Elektra Records	Mötley Crüe
Dr. Feelgood	1989	Elektra Records	Mötley Crüe
Mötley Crüe	1994	Elektra Records	Mötley Crüe
Generation Swine	1997	Elektra Records	Mötley Crüe
Diet for a New America	2000	Americoma/Beyond	58
New Tattoo	2000	Mötley Records	Mötley Crüe
Here Come the Brides	2004	Sanctuary Records Group	Brides of Destruction
The Heroin Diaries Soundtrack	2007	Eleven Seven	Sixx:A.M.
Saints of Los Angeles	2008	Eleven Seven	Mötley Crüe
This Is Gonna Hurt	2011	Eleven Seven	Sixx:A.M.
7	2011	Eleven Seven	Sixx:A.M.
Modern Vintage	2014	Eleven Seven	Sixx:A.M.
Prayers for the Damned, Vol. 1	2016	Eleven Seven	Sixx:A.M.
Prayers for the Blessed, Vol. 2	2016	Eleven Seven	Sixx:A.M.

=== Production and songwriting credits ===
Year	Album title	Band	Record label	Credits
1988	Lita	Lita Ford	RCA	Co-writer "Falling in and Out of Love"
1989	Fire and Gasoline	Steve Jones	MCA	Co-writer "We're No Saints...."
1991	Hey Stoopid	Alice Cooper	Epic	Co-writer "Die for You"
2002	Back into Your System	Saliva	Island	Co-writer "Rest in Pieces"
2003	Couldn't Have Said It Better	Meat Loaf	Polydor/Sanctuary	Co-writer "Couldn't Have Said It Better", "Love You Out Loud" and "Man of Steel"
2004	ForThemAsses	OPM	Suburban Noize	Co-writer "Horny"
2005	Here I Am	Marion Raven	Atlantic	Co-writer "Heads Will Roll" and "Surfing the Sun"
2005	Runaway Brides	Brides of Destruction	Shrapnel	Co-writer "Criminal", "This Time Around" and "Blown Away"
2006	Bat Out of Hell III: The Monster Is Loose	Meat Loaf	Virgin/Mercury	Co-writer "The Monster Is Loose"
2007	Set Me Free	Marion Raven	Eleven Seven/Warner Bros.	Co-writer "Set Me Free" and "Heads Will Roll"
2007	Full Circle	Drowning Pool	Eleven Seven	Co-writer and producer on "Reason I'm Alive"
2008	Sunset Man	James Otto	Warner Bros.	Co-writer "Ain't Gonna Stop"
2009	Whatever Gets You Off	The Last Vegas	Eleven Seven	Co-writer and producer on "I'm Bad", "Apologize" and "Cherry Red"
2010	Tattoos & Tequila	Vince Neil	Eleven Seven	Co-writer "Another Bad Day"
