= James Michael =

American record producer and musician

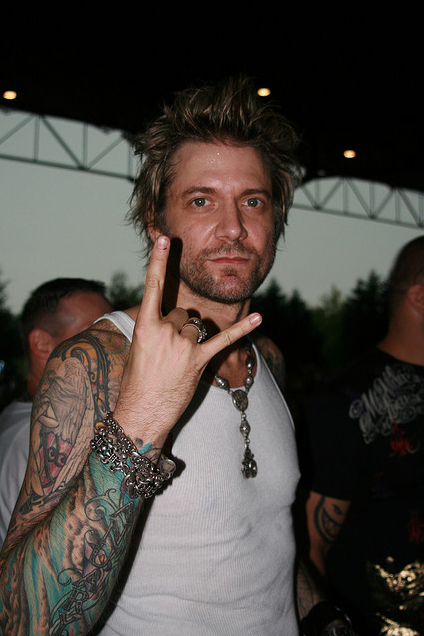
- Michael in 2008

Background information
- Born: James Andrew Michael
- Origin: Holland, Michigan, U.S.
- Genres: Alternative rock; hard rock; alternative metal; heavy metal
- Occupations: Record producer; sound engineer; songwriter; musician
- Instruments: Vocals; guitar; keyboards
- Formerly of: Sixx:A.M.
- Website: James Michael on YouTube

James Andrew Michael is an American record producer, sound engineer, mixer, songwriter, and musician. He was the lead singer of the rock band Sixx:A.M. Michael has worked as a producer, songwriter, and/or engineer/mixer with many rock and pop artists including Kelly Clarkson, Alanis Morissette, Meat Loaf, Mötley Crüe, HammerFall, Scorpions, Hilary Duff, The Rasmus, Papa Roach, Trapt, American Bang, Saliva, The Exies, Deana Carter, Sammy Hagar, Lillix, Sarah Kelly, Halestorm, Jack's Mannequin, Brides of Destruction, Marion Raven and Victoria Justice.

== Early life ==
Michael took piano lessons while growing up and sang in Holland High School's show choir, Vocal Dimensions. As a teen, he played in different local rock bands including The Way We Dress and Night Shift. In the late 1980s, he moved to Los Angeles to pursue his musical career.

== Career ==
Michael put out his first solo album in 2000 titled Inhale. Michael wrote, produced and mixed the entire album and often played all the instruments.

Michael is co-founder (along with Nikki Sixx and DJ Ashba) and lead singer of the rock band Sixx:A.M. The band's debut album, The Heroin Diaries Soundtrack, produced by Michael, was on the Billboard 200 album chart for 26 consecutive weeks and featured the No. 1 rock track of 2008 and gold-selling single "Life Is Beautiful". He also co-wrote and handled production for the band's second album, This Is Gonna Hurt, which debuted at No. 10 on the Billboard 200 and its second track, "Lies of the Beautiful People", went No. 1 on Active Rock radio.

Michael produced, mixed and co-wrote (alongside Sixx:A.M. bandmate DJ Ashba) Mötley Crüe's last studio album Saints of Los Angeles that debuted at No. 4 on the Billboard 200. He also co-wrote the song "Higher Than Heaven" for James Durbin's Memories of a Beautiful Disaster album released on November 21, 2011. He produced Papa Roach's new album, The Connection (as well as co-wrote the track "Where Did the Angels Go"), which debuted at No. 17 on the Billboard 200 chart. Other projects from around this time include writing the track "People Like Us" for the Kelly Clarkson Greatest Hits – Chapter One mixing Hinder's new album Welcome to the Freak Show and writing with and contributing vocals for Halestorm, plus writing and producing "Take a Hint" for Victoria Justice featured in the show Victorious.

He released a solo song "Learn to Hate You," which premiered on November 26, 2012.

Michael met up with Sixx and Ashba early in 2013 to start writing songs for a new Sixx:A.M. album, which turned out to be Modern Vintage, released in 2014. It debuted at #1 on the rock charts. The band followed up in 2016 with two albums Prayers for the Damned and Prayers for the Blessed, before going on a successful USA and European tour. The following year, they decided to take a hiatus.

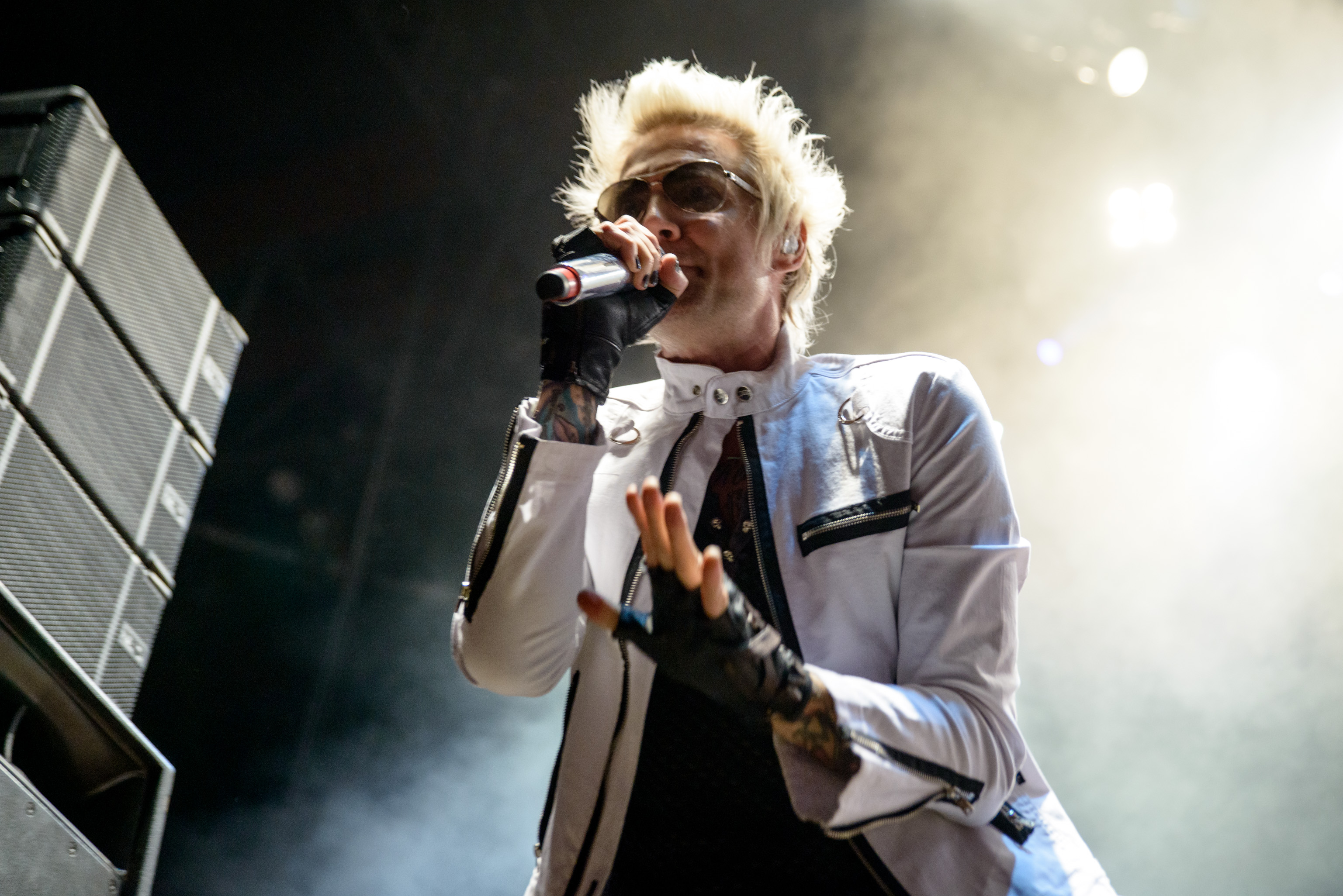
Michael performing with Sixx:A.M. in 2016

In 2019, Sixx:A.M. released their first song in three years, "Talk to Me," in support of the #TalktoMe campaign against opioid addiction. The following year, James performed on a remake of a Sixx:A.M. song, "Maybe It's Time," featuring Ivan Moody (Five Finger Death Punch), Tommy Vext (Bad Wolves), Arron Bruno (Awolnation), Joe Elliot (Def Leppard) and Slash (Guns N' Roses), all proceeds again were donated to the battle against opioid addiction, a cause important to James throughout his career.

In 2021, Sixx:A.M. released their Hits album, a compilation of fan favorites and a few new tracks most notably "The First 21."

James Michael's 2022 releases include The Retaliators movie theme, "21 Bullets," written by James and Nikki Sixx. He then released a solo recording, California Smile. He is currently working in his recording studios in both the US and UK/Ireland developing new rock and pop artists, focusing heavily on his strengths as a multi-instrumentalist, songwriter, lead vocalist, producer, and mixer.

== Partial discography ==
Discography
| Year | Artist | Album |
|---|---|---|
| 2000 | Solo | Inhale |
| 2000 | Mötley Crüe | New Tattoo |
| | Sammy Hagar | Ten 13: A little Bit More |
| 2002 | Saliva | Back into Your System: Rest in Pieces |
| 2003 | Meat Loaf | Couldn't Have Said It Better |
| 2004 | Hilary Duff | Hilary Duff: The Getaway |
| | Brides of Destruction | Here Comes the Brides: Only Get So Far/Brace Yourself |
| 2005 | Alanis Morissette | The Collection |
| 2005 | Lillix | Inside The Hollow |
| | Deana Carter | The Story of My Life: In a Heartbeat/The Girl You Left Me For |
| 2006 | Meat Loaf | Bat Out of Hell III: The Monster Is Loose |
| | Sarah Kelly | The Beauty of It All |
| | Jack's Mannequin | Snakes on a Plane Soundtrack: Bruised |
| 2007 | The Exies | A Modern Way of Living with the Truth |
| 2007 | Marion Raven | Set Me Free |
| 2007 | Sixx:A.M. | The Heroin Diaries Soundtrack |
| 2007 | Scorpions | Humanity: Hour I |
| 2008 | Sixx:A.M. | Live Is Beautiful |
| 2008 | Mötley Crüe | Saints of Los Angeles |
| | Trapt | Who's Going Home with You Tonight? |
| | Sixx:A.M. | X-Mas in Hell |
| 2009 | Papa Roach | Metamorphosis |
| 2010 | Meat Loaf | Hang Cool Teddy Bear |
| | American Bang | American Bang: Wild & Young/Angels |
| 2011 | Sixx:A.M. | This Is Gonna Hurt |
| 2011 | HammerFall | Infected |
| 2011 | James Durbin | Memories of a Beautiful Disaster |
| | The Rasmus | Justify |
| | Sixx:A.M. | 7 |
| 2012 | Papa Roach | The Connection |
| 2012 | Kelly Clarkson | Greatest Hits: Chapter One |
| 2012 | Halestorm | The Strange Case Of... |
| | Victoria Justice | Victorious: Take a Hint |
| | Solo | Learn to Hate You |
| | Hinder | Welcome to the Freak Show |
| 2014 | Sixx:A.M. | Modern Vintage |
| 2014 | Caleb Johnson | Testify |
| 2014 | HammerFall | (r)Evolution |
| 2016 | Bleeker | Erase You |
| | Sixx:A.M. | Prayers for the Damned |
| | Sixx:A.M. | Prayers for the Blessed |
| | In Flames | Battles: Drained |
| 2019 | Sixx:A.M. | Talk to Me |
| 2020 | Sixx:A.M. (new version featuring Joe Elliott, Brantley Gilbert, Ivan Moody, Slash, Corey Taylor, Awolnation and Tommy Vext) | Maybe It's Time |
| 2021 | Sixx:A.M. | Hits |
| 2022 | Motley Crue, Ice Nine Kills, Asking Alexandria and From Ashes To New | The Retaliators: 21 Bullets |
| | Solo | California Smile |
