= Life Is Beautiful (Sixx:A.M. song) =

Single by Sixx:A.M.

from the album The Heroin Diaries Soundtrack
- Released: 2007
- Recorded: 2007
- Genre: Hard rock; post-grunge
- Length: 3:35
- Label: Eleven Seven
- Songwriters: DJ Ashba; James Michael; Nikki Sixx
- Producer: Sixx:A.M.

Sixx:A.M. singles chronology
"Life Is Beautiful" (2007)	"Pray for Me" (2008)

"Life Is Beautiful" is debut single by American rock band Sixx:A.M., and lead single from their debut album, The Heroin Diaries Soundtrack. The song was written by Nikki Sixx, founding member of both Sixx:A.M. and Mötley Crüe. "Life Is Beautiful" quickly gained popularity and reached number two on the U.S. Hot Mainstream Rock Tracks chart and number 25 on the Hot Modern Rock Tracks chart.

== Song meaning ==
"Life Is Beautiful" is about Sixx's past drug addiction, the difficulties he encountered while addicted, and his realization that "Life Is Beautiful." Part of the chorus of the song, "Will you swear on your life, that no one will cry at my funeral", is a quote from Sixx's former roommate and co-lead guitarist from Ratt, Robbin Crosby. Years after being turned onto heroin by Sixx, Crosby died from a heroin overdose in 2002.

== Music video ==
The music video for the song features band's performance with lyrics and rough hand illustrations scrawled across the screen. The drummer in the video is Bones Elias from the bands Heaven Below and Julien-K.

== Track listing ==
No.	Title	Length
1.	"Life is Beautiful" (radio mix)	3:47

== Charts ==
=== Weekly charts ===
Weekly chart performance for "Life Is Beautiful"
Chart (2007–2008)	Peak position
US Bubbling Under Hot 100 (Billboard)	4
US Alternative Airplay (Billboard)	25
US Mainstream Rock (Billboard)	2

=== Year-end charts ===
Year-end chart performance for "Life Is Beautiful"
Chart (2007)	Position
US Mainstream Rock Songs (Billboard)	29

2008 year-end chart performance for "Life Is Beautiful"
Chart (2008)	Position
US Mainstream Rock (Billboard)	5
