= The Heroin Diaries Soundtrack =

Studio album by Sixx:A.M.
- Released: August 21, 2007
- Recorded: 2007
- Genres: Hard rock, alternative metal, spoken word
- Length: 51:01
- Label: Eleven Seven Music
- Producer: Sixx:A.M.

Sixx:A.M. chronology
The Heroin Diaries Soundtrack (2007)	X-Mas in Hell (2008)

Singles from The Heroin Diaries Soundtrack
- 1. "Life Is Beautiful" Released: 2007; 2. "Pray for Me" Released: 2008; 3. "Tomorrow" Released: 2008; 4. "Accidents Can Happen" Released: August 9, 2008

The Heroin Diaries Soundtrack, often referred to as simply The Heroin Diaries, is the debut studio album by Sixx:A.M., a side project of Mötley Crüe bassist Nikki Sixx. The band also features lead vocalist James Michael and guitarist DJ Ashba. The concept album serves as the companion soundtrack to Sixx's autobiography, The Heroin Diaries: A Year in the Life of a Shattered Rock Star, and is about Sixx's severe heroin addiction in 1987. The first single, "Life Is Beautiful," debuted at number 26 on the Billboard Mainstream Rock Tracks chart.

== Concept ==
Designed to be an accompaniment to The Heroin Diaries: A Year in the Life of a Shattered Rock Star, the autobiography of Mötley Crüe bassist Nikki Sixx co-written by Sixx and Ian Gittens that details his severe heroin addiction in 1987, The Heroin Diaries Soundtrack is a concept album that captures Sixx's basic story of his life during that time, although the album can stand alone. The story begins with the reasons for Sixx starting his diary, followed by his first (albeit temporary) abstinence from heroin, his relapse and mental and physical decline, his near-fatal overdose and out-of-body experience, and finally, his emotional recovery, which eventually led to long-term sobriety. The 13 tracks on the album each correspond to one month of his diary, which he kept from December 1986 to December 1987. Some of the tracks feature spoken word featuring Sixx himself reading some lines from the book.

== Release ==
"Life Is Beautiful", the first single off the album, was originally posted on Sixx's MySpace page; after "[picking] up momentum", it debuted at #26 on the Billboard rock singles chart. It peaked at number 2 on the Hot Mainstream Rock Tracks chart. The album was released on August 21, 2007. It has sold 344,000 copies to date in the U.S. as of May 2011.

=== Deluxe edition ===
A deluxe edition of The Heroin Diaries was released on November 25, 2008, exclusively on sale through Best Buy. The deluxe edition features the original album and a bonus live EP, entitled Live Is Beautiful. This EP was recorded from several performances over their summer 2008 tour on Crüe Fest. The EP is also sold separately for those who already have the original album.

=== 10th anniversary edition ===
On October 26, 2017, the band released the 10th anniversary edition of the album, which features additional tracks; re-recordings in alternate arrangements of "Life Is Beautiful", "Accidents Can Happen", and "Girl with Golden Eyes".

== Track listing ==
All lyrics are written by James Michael and Nikki Sixx, except where noted.

No.	Title	Music	Length
1.	"X-Mas in Hell" (instrumental with spoken word, lyrics by Sixx)	Nikki Sixx, DJ Ashba	2:10
2.	"Van Nuys"	James Michael	3:52
3.	"Life Is Beautiful"	Sixx, Ashba, Michael	3:36
4.	"Pray for Me"	Sixx, Ashba, Michael	4:14
5.	"Tomorrow"	Sixx, Scott Stevens, Michael, Ashba, David Walsh	4:05
6.	"Accidents Can Happen"	Sixx, Ashba, Michael	4:07
7.	"Intermission" (instrumental with spoken word, lyrics by Sixx)	Sixx, Ashba	2:20
8.	"Dead Man's Ballet"	Michael	5:25
9.	"Heart Failure"	Sixx, Ashba, Michael	4:58
10.	"Girl with Golden Eyes"	Sixx, Ashba, Michael	4:20
11.	"Courtesy Call"	Michael	4:41
12.	"Permission"	Michael	4:14
13.	"Life After Death" (instrumental with spoken word, lyrics by Sixx)	Sixx, Ashba	3:00
Total length:			51:01

10th anniversary edition bonus tracks
No.	Title	Length
14.	"Life Is Beautiful 2017"	4:30
15.	"Accidents Can Happen 2017"	4:12
16.	"Girl with Golden Eyes 2017"	4:44

== Reception ==
Professional ratings
Review scores
Source	Rating
About.com	4/5 stars
Allmusic	4/5 stars
The Gauntlet	4.5/5 stars
IGN.com	8/10 stars
Jukebox:Metal	5/5 stars
Sputnikmusic	4/5 stars

The Heroin Diaries Soundtrack, noted by many for showcasing a more emotional sound than, and a musical departure from Sixx's other band, Mötley Crüe, has been received very positively. Jim Kaz of IGN, praising the emotional lyrics of the album, called it "not really an album but rather a musical book. It is almost impossible to recommend any specific songs over others."

== Personnel ==
- Nikki Sixx – bass, backing vocals
- DJ Ashba – lead guitar, backing vocals
- James Michael – lead vocals, rhythm guitar, keyboards, drums, programming
