= Collection: The Shrapnel Years (Tony MacAlpine album) =

Greatest hits album by Tony MacAlpine
- Released: March 14, 2006
- Recorded: 1985–2001 at various locations
- Genres: Instrumental rock, neoclassical metal
- Length: 60:58
- Label: Shrapnel
- Producers: Tony MacAlpine, Mike Varney, Robert Margouleff, Larry Dennison, Glen Sobel, Brian Levi, Steve Fontano, Steve Smith

Tony MacAlpine chronology
Chromaticity (2001)	Collection: The Shrapnel Years (2006)	Tony MacAlpine (2011)

Professional ratings
Review scores
Source	Rating
AllMusic	3.5/5 stars

Collection: The Shrapnel Years is a compilation album by guitarist Tony MacAlpine, released on March 14, 2006, through Shrapnel Records. It includes tracks from six of MacAlpine's studio albums.

== Track listing ==
All music is composed by Tony MacAlpine.

No.	Title	Original album	Length
1.	"Wheel of Fortune"	Edge of Insanity	3:43
2.	"Agrionia"	Edge of Insanity	4:31
3.	"The Witch and the Priest"	Edge of Insanity	5:00
4.	"Edge of Insanity"	Edge of Insanity	4:21
5.	"Champion"	Freedom to Fly	5:14
6.	"Rats with Wings"	Madness	5:25
7.	"The Violin Song"	Premonition	6:01
8.	"Tower of London"	Premonition	4:15
9.	"The Sage"	Evolution	4:49
10.	"Time Table"	Evolution	6:20
11.	"Christmas Island"	Chromaticity	5:44
12.	"Chromaticity"	Chromaticity	5:35
Total length:			60:58

== Personnel ==
- Tony MacAlpine – guitar, keyboard (except track 7), production
- Jens Johansson – keyboard (track 7)
- Steve Smith – drums (tracks 1–4, 11, 12), production
- Mike Terrana – drums (tracks 5, 9, 10)
- Glen Sobel – drums (track 6) production
- Deen Castronovo – drums (tracks 7, 8)
- Billy Sheehan – bass (tracks 1–4)
- Larry Dennison – bass (tracks 5, 6), production
- Tony Franklin – bass (tracks 7–10)
- Barry Sparks – bass (tracks 11, 12)
- Mike Varney – production
- Robert Margouleff – production
- Brian Levi – production
- Steve Fontano – production
