= Live on Fire =

Live On Fire

Live album by Axel Rudi Pell
- Released: March 22, 2013
- Genre: Hard rock Speed metal Power metal Heavy metal
- Length: 1:50:31
- Label: SPV

Axel Rudi Pell chronology
Circle of the Oath (2012)	Live On Fire (2013)

Professional ratings
Review scores
Source	Rating
Jukebox:Metal	2/5 stars
Time For Metal - Magazin	8/10 stars

Live On Fire is the third live album by the German guitar-player Axel Rudi Pell.

== Track listing ==
=== CD Version: Disc 1 (Essigfabrik, Cologne, Germany (October 18, 2012)) ===
1. "The Guillotine Suite (Intro)" (from Circle of the Oath)
2. "Ghost In The Black" (from Circle of the Oath)
3. "Strong as A Rock" (from Kings and Queens)
4. "Before I Die" (from Circle of the Oath)
5. "The Masquerade Ball/Casbah/Dreaming Dead/Whole Lotta Love/Dreaming Dead" (from The Masquerade Ball/Between the Walls/The Crest)
6. "Drum Solo"
7. "Mystica/Mistreated/Mystica" (from Mystica)

=== CD Version: Disc 2 (Essigfabrik, Cologne, Germany (October 18, 2012)) ===
1. "Oceans of Time" (from Oceans of Time)
2. "Circle of the Oath" (from Circle of the Oath)
3. "Fool Fool" (from Black Moon Pyramid)
4. "Keyboard Solo/Carousel/Jam/Carousel" (from Oceans of Time)
5. "Tear Down The Walls/Nasty Reputation" (from The Masquerade Ball/Nasty Reputation)
6. "Rock the Nation" (from Mystica)

=== DVD Version: Disc 1 (Essigfabrik, Cologne, Germany (October 18, 2012)) ===
1. "The Guillotine Suite (Intro)"
2. "Ghost In The Black"
3. "Strong as A Rock"
4. "Before I Die"
5. "The Masquerade Ball/Casbah/Dreaming Dead/Whole Lotta Love/Dreaming Dead"
6. "Drum Solo"
7. "Mystica/Mistreated/Mystica"
8. "Oceans of Time"
9. "Circle of the Oath"
10. "Fool Fool"
11. "Keyboard Solo/Carousel/Jam/Carousel"
12. "Tear Down The Walls/Nasty Reputation"
13. "Rock the Nation"

=== DVD Version: Disc 2 (Rock of Ages Festival (July 28, 2012) + bonus features) ===
1. "The Guillotine Suite (Intro)"
2. "Ghost In The Black"
3. "Strong as A Rock"
4. "Before I Die"
5. "The Masquerade Ball/Casbah/Dreaming Dead/Whole Lotta Love/Dreaming Dead"
6. "Drum Solo"
7. "Mystica/Mistreated/Mystica"
8. "Oceans of Time"
9. "Circle of the Oath"
10. "Tear Down The Walls/Nasty Reputation"
11. "Rock the Nation"
12. "Axel Rudi Pell: The Home Story (bonus)"
13. "Axel Rudi Pell: Interview (bonus)"
14. "Hallelujah (Music Video) (bonus)"

== Credits ==
- Johnny Gioeli – vocals
- Axel Rudi Pell – guitar
- Volker Krawczak – bass guitar
- Fredy Doernberg – keyboard
- Mike Terrana – drums
