= Tony MacAlpine (album) =

Studio album by Tony MacAlpine
- Released: June 14, 2011
- Recorded: The Cottage (Pasadena, California)
- Genre: Instrumental rock, progressive metal
- Length: 54:11
- Label: Favored Nations
- Producer: Tony MacAlpine, Michael Mesker

Tony MacAlpine chronology
Collection: The Shrapnel Years (2006)	Tony MacAlpine (2011)	Concrete Gardens (2015)

Professional ratings
Review scores
Source	Rating
AllMusic	3.5/5 stars

Tony MacAlpine is the self-titled tenth studio album by guitarist Tony MacAlpine, released on June 14, 2011, through Favored Nations Entertainment (United States) and King Records (Japan, Korea and Taiwan). The album is MacAlpine's first solo release in ten years following Chromaticity (2001), and the first to feature his extensive use of seven- and eight-string guitars—a staple of his playing which began in the days he spent with Planet X throughout the 2000s.

== Track listing ==
All music is composed by Tony MacAlpine, except where noted.

No.	Title	Length
1.	"Serpens Cauda"	4:22
2.	"Ölüdeniz"	5:15
3.	"Fire Mountain"	4:23
4.	"Dream Mechanism"	4:18
5.	"10 Seconds to Mercury"	4:35
6.	"Flowers for Monday"	3:04
7.	"Angel of Twilight"	5:02
8.	"Pyrokinesis"	3:56
9.	"Blue Maserati"	4:41
10.	"Summer Palace"	4:35
11.	"Salar de Uyuni"	5:39
12.	"The Dedication" (Robert Schumann)	4:22
Total length:		54:12

Japanese edition bonus track
No.	Title	Length
13.	"Donostia"

== Personnel ==
- Tony MacAlpine – guitar, keyboard, drum programming, bass (except track 2), production
- Virgil Donati – drums (tracks 1, 5, 10)
- Marco Minnemann – drums (tracks 3, 4, 8, 12)
- Philip Bynoe – bass (track 2)
- Ulrich Wild – mixing (except track 6)
- Geoff Allen Ambrose – mixing (track 6)
- Raidar – mixing assistance (except track 6)
- Dave Collins – mastering
- Michael Mesker – executive production
