= Glen Sobel =

American drummer

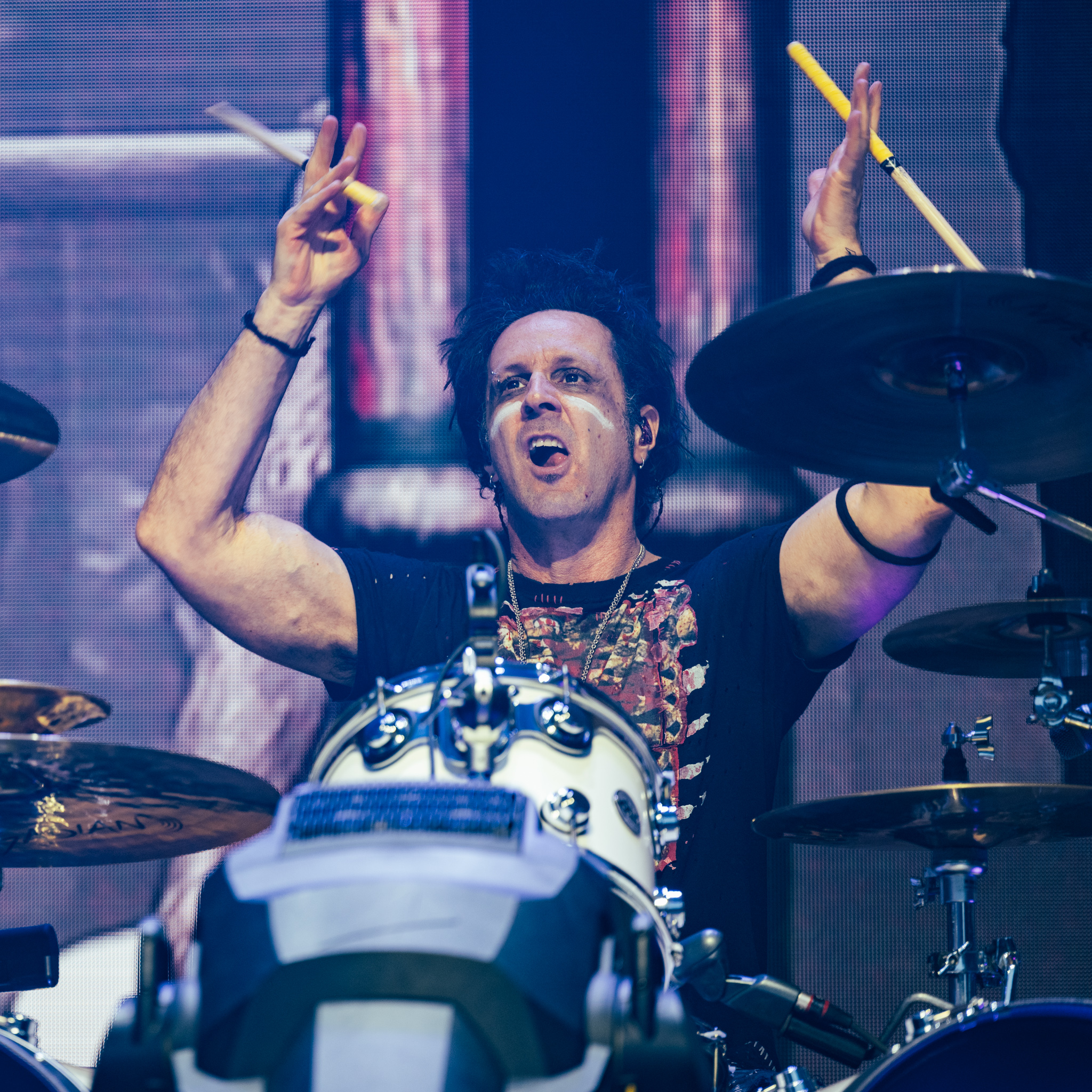
- Sobel performing with Alice Cooper in 2024

Background information
- Born: December 27, 1970 (age 55)
- Genres: Hard rock, progressive rock, heavy metal
- Instrument: Drums
- Years active: 1993–present
- Website: glensobel.com

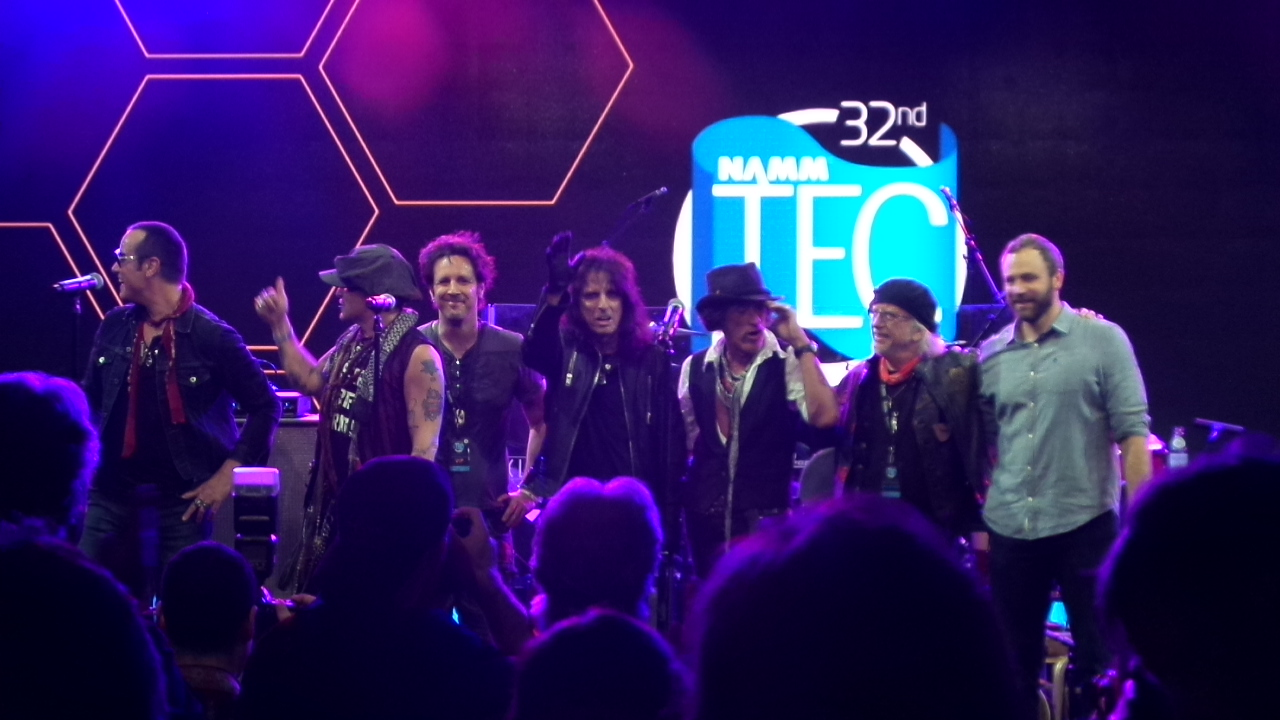
Glen Sobel performs with the Hollywood Vampires at the 32nd TEC Awards at NAMM in 2017.

Glen Sobel (born December 27, 1970) is an American drummer who has performed and recorded in many different genres. Mainly known for being the drummer for Alice Cooper since 2011, Sobel has worked with other musicians/groups, including Mötley Crüe, Hollywood Vampires, Richie Sambora, Orianthi, Beautiful Creatures, Chris Impellitteri, Gary Hoey, Tony MacAlpine, Jennifer Batten, Paul Gilbert, Saga, and Shark Island.

As a member of the house band at various events from 2011 to present, Sobel played behind such varied artists as Steven Tyler, Joe Perry, Sammy Hagar, Johnny Depp, Jim Carrey, Rob Halford, "Weird" Al Yankovic, Mike Myers, Sarah McLachlan, Michael McDonald, Robbie Krieger, Kesha, Arthur Brown, and others.

== Biography ==
A native of Los Angeles, Sobel began playing drums at the age of eleven. He studied drums throughout high school whilst playing in marching bands, jazz bands and other bands outside of school, ultimately winning a large drum-off competition in Los Angeles at the age of 19. This soon led to his first pro gig playing for guitar virtuoso Tony MacAlpine. Sobel recorded one record with MacAlpine in 1993, entitled Madness, which featured jazz saxophone luminary Branford Marsalis.

Switching musical gears, Sobel took gigs with SX-10, a rap/rock hybrid band with Sen Dog of Cypress Hill which featured many other rap luminaries of the day such as Everlast and Kottonmouth Kings. Soon after, Sobel accepted an offer to become a band member of Warner Bros. Records artists Beautiful Creatures whose line-up also featured Joe Leste of Bang Tango and DJ Ashba of Sixx: A.M. and Guns N' Roses. Beautiful Creatures participated in several tours in 2001 including Ozzfest, opening for Marilyn Manson and others.

The next few years saw Sobel playing on a number of tours and recording jobs including playing on the new version of "Heavy Action" (the Monday Night Football theme on ESPN) and touring with American Idol second runner up Elliott Yamin who scored a top ten smash in 2007.

Teaching jobs also followed with a faculty position in the drum department at Musician's Institute in Hollywood, which led to appearing and performing at various drum clinics and festivals in several countries such as Drum Daze in Columbus, Ohio, the Laguna Drum Festival in Mexico and various clinics throughout Asia and Europe.

In September 2010, Sobel got a last minute call to sub for an injured Matt Laug on the Vasco Rossi 2010 Indoor Tour of Italy. The tour saw crowds in excess of 40,000 people and Sobel filled in for five weeks.

In October 2015 during Mötley Crüe's farewell tour, Sobel filled in for Tommy Lee, who was unable to perform due to tendinitis in his wrist. Sobel played drums in both Alice Cooper and Mötley Crüe for five consecutive shows while Lee was recovering from his injury.

On January 21, 2017, Sobel performed with the Hollywood Vampires at the TEC Awards that honored Joe Perry with the Les Paul Award.

When not on the road, Sobel plays around Los Angeles with various artists including Def Leppard guitarist Vivian Campbell's band, Sir Sodoff and the Trainwrecks.

== Discography ==
=== Recordings ===
- (2023) Alice Cooper - Road
- (2018) Alice Cooper - A Paranormal Evening With Alice Cooper - At The Paris Olympia
- (2018) Adrian Galysh - Venusian Sunrise: 20th Anniversary Edition
- (2015) Hollywood Vampires - Hollywood Vampires
- (2014) Vasco Rossi - Sono Innocente
- (2013) Alice Cooper - Raise the Dead: Live at Wacken
- (2011) Tina Guo – The Journey
- (2009) Carly Patterson – Back to the Beginning
- (2008) Adrian Galysh – Earth Tones
- (2007) Paul Gilbert – Get Out of My Yard (guitar instructional DVD)
- (2007) Tiffany – I Think We're Alone Now: '80s Hits and More
- (2006) Jeff Scott Soto – Essential Ballads
- (2006) Shark Island – Gathering of the Faithful
- (2006) Tony MacAlpine – Collection: The Shrapnel Years
- (2005) Various artists – An All Star Tribute to Cher
- (2005) Beautiful Creatures – Deuce
- (2005) Gary Hoey – Monster Surf
- (2004) SX-10 – Rhymes in the Chamber
- (2004) Gary Hoey – The Best of Gary Hoey
- (2004) Impellitteri – Pedal to the Metal
- (2004) Various artists – Cypress Thrill (X-Ray)
- (2004) Jeff Scott Soto – Lost in the Translation
- (2004) Various artists – Hey! It's a Teenacide Pajama Party!
- (2004) Ken Tamplin and Friends – Wake the Nations
- (2003) Gary Hoey – Ho! Ho! Hoey: The Complete Collection
- (2002) Impellitteri – System X
- (2002) Impellitteri – The Very Best of Impellitteri: Faster Than the Speed of Light
- (2001) Beautiful Creatures – Beautiful Creatures
- (2001) Various artists – Straight Out of Cypress
- (2001) Gary Hoey – Best of Ho! Ho! Hoey
- (2000) Impellitteri – Crunch
- (2000) SX-10 – Mad Dog American
- (1999) Gary Hoey – Money
- (1999) Christian Anthony – Naked and Alive
- (1998) Gary Hoey – Hocus Pocus Live
- (1997) Jennifer Batten – Jennifer Batten's Tribal Rage: Momentum
- (1997) Saga – Pleasure & the Pain
- (1993) Tony MacAlpine – Madness

=== Movie soundtracks ===
- (2005) Tom Clancy's Rainbow Six: Lockdown
- (2002) Rollerball
- (2002) Narc
- (2001) Valentine
- (1998) Meet the Deedles

=== Television Soundtracks ===
- (2007) Monday Night Football Theme
- (2005) MTV's Trailer Fabulous
- (2001) Smallville
