= Mark Boals =

American singer

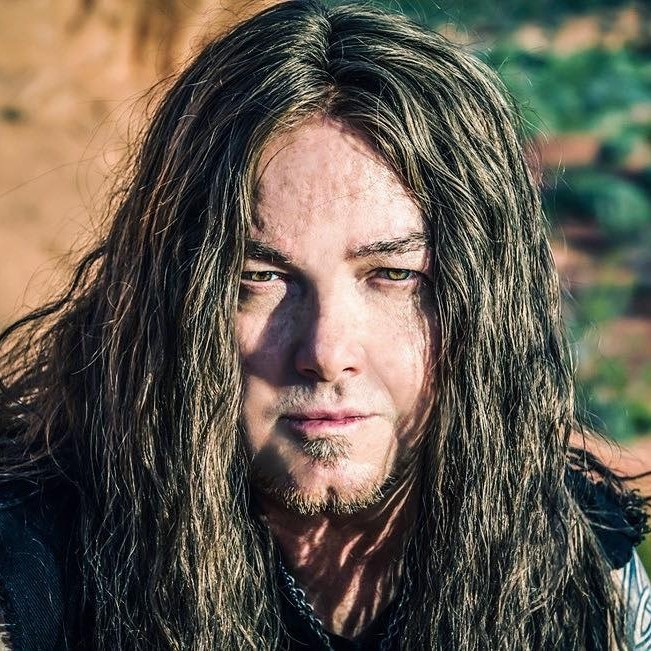
- Boals in 2019

Background information
- Born: December 5, 1958 (age 67); Youngstown, Ohio, U.S.
- Genres: Heavy metal, neoclassical metal, power metal, progressive metal
- Occupations: Singer, songwriter, musician
- Instruments: Vocals, bass
- Years active: 1981–present
- Website: markboalsofficial.com

Mark Robert Boals is an American heavy metal singer and occasional bassist, known for his vocals with Yngwie Malmsteen. Boals is also an occasional singer-songwriter and bassist for the band Foundry.

Boals' first album with Malmsteen, 1986's Trilogy, sold several million copies worldwide. As a young child, he learned to play the piano and bass guitar. Although Boals has never had any vocal lessons or training, as a teenager he gained experience as a vocalist in local groups. Boals is the founder and vocalist for the band Ring of Fire, and had a brief stint as the bassist for Dokken.

== Career ==
In 1982, Boals joined Savoy Brown and toured around Canada and the U.S. through 1983. Although several songs were written for a proposed new album, the record never materialized due to mainman Kim Simmonds running into legal problems at the time. During these years Boals also performed with his band Lazer.

While with Savoy Brown, Boals met Ted Nugent and joined his band as bassist in 1984 touring throughout the U.S. and opening up for Judas Priest in Europe. Deciding to focus on singing and being a frontman, Boals moved to California in 1985. He joined Yngwie Malmsteen's Rising Force and performed on the Trilogy album. Boals' first show with Malmsteen was at Day on the Green in San Francisco, CA in front of 80,000 fans. After leaving Yngwie in 1986, he gave up music for a time, trying to find himself in cinematography and working for Warner Brothers. In this period he recorded, with Mike Slamer, a soundtrack for the film White Water Summer (1987); he also appeared on Maestro Alex Gregory's "Paganini's Last Stand" (Priority Records) in 1992.

Boals' next venture was Billionaires Boys Club, a short lived supergroup featuring former Accept guitarist Jörg Fischer, future HammerFall bassist Magnus Rosén, and former Yngwie Malmsteen bandmate, drummer Anders Johansson. The group's sole album, Something Wicked Comes, was released on Polydor Records in 1993.

Then in 1996, Yngwie Malmsteen called Boals and asked if he wanted to perform on several songs on the cover album Inspiration. Boals accepted, and resumed his role as vocalist with Yngwie Malmsteen for the album Alchemy. The band subsequently went on tour.

In March 2000, Boals won the No.1 Vocalist Prize in the Japanese music magazines Burrn! and Young Guitar. At the end of that year, on the same day, his second solo CD, entitled Ring Of Fire and Yngwie Malmsteen's War To End All Wars, with Boals on vocals, were released. However, after many years of musical magic and friendship, the team of Malmsteen and Boals had decided to move in different directions, and Boals formed a new band, Ring of Fire, named after his solo album. At the beginning of this year, Ring of Fire recorded their subsequent debut The Oracle album at the George Bellas Studios in Chicago. Alongside Boals were George Bellas, Vitalij Kuprij, Virgil Donati and Philip Bynoe.

In addition Boals has participated in two exciting projects of Lion Music in Finland. He appears on the Jason Becker tribute "Warmth in the Wilderness", singing a version of David Lee Roth's "Hammerhead Shark" with Lars Eric Mattsson. Speaking about Mattsson, in 2005 he also recorded an album War with Boals lead singing on track "Deep In The Shadows". As Malmsteen urgently needed a singer for his current tour, Boals has toured again with him in Europe, but only as guest vocalist.

Also Boals is featured on vocals on two songs, "Into The Light" and "I Will Always Be There", for the Empire CD Hypnotica (2001). Another cool project where Boals took part in, was Genius: A Rock Opera trilogy by Daniele Liverani. There he was recording as the main character (Genius) on Episode 1: A human into dreams' world (2002) and Episode 2: In search of the little prince (2004). But he refused to sing on the last Episode because of personal reasons and was replaced by D. C. Cooper. In 2004 Boals recorded two songs for young Japanese guitarist named Takayoshi Ohmura. Ohmura's debut album, entitled "Nowhere To Go", features additional guest appearances by Doogie White (Yngwie Malmsteen, Cornerstone, ex-Rainbow) and Richie Kotzen (ex-Mr. Big, Poison). Commented Boals:

After I was asked by the representatives of Ohmura, I listened to his demo. I thought his music was good and he has a talent to play guitar, and I thought it'd be great to support this young Japanese musician. I also thought it would be great to share the vocals with the other singers, Richie Kotzen and Doogie White, so I recorded two songs here in L.A. and sent them to Japan.

Boals has also performed with Lana Lane, Indigo Dying, Empire and Chris Brooks.

2000s years Boals recorded 3 solo albums as well as three studio albums and one live DVD with his own band, Ring Of Fire. The project album called The Codex Boals recorded with Magnus Karlsson in 2007. The album project marks the return to recording after a 3 years hiatus for Boals. In 2007 Boals started looking for a serious, permanent band situation and Royal Hunt became a perfect opportunity for a singer to exploit and expand his vocal abilities.

In 2008 Boals appeared on his first Royal Hunt album Collision Course... Paradox 2. Boals also appeared on Uli Jon Roth's album titled Under A Dark Sky on which he shared vocal duties with Liz Vandall. The band with Boals toured the world from July – December 2008. In 2009, he also worked with such bands like Vindictiv and Wolf, and completed work on the latest Royal Hunt album X which was released in January 2010. Mark is also currently handling vocal duties in the band Seven The Hardway featuring guitarist Tony MacAlpine which released a self-titled album in August 2010.

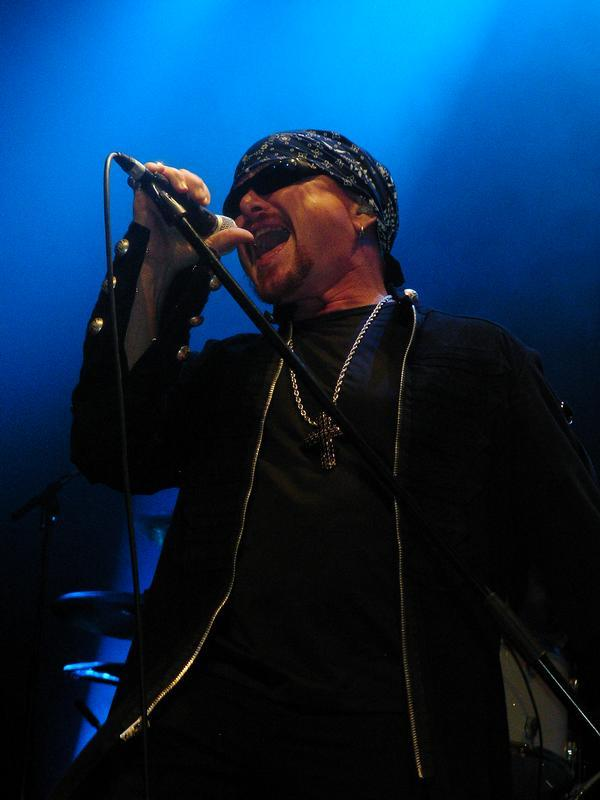
Boals with Royal Hunt in 2008

A press release dated June 19, 2011, announced that Boals would be recording vocals for the Wagnerian opera metal project Lyraka.

In 2012, he sang lead vocals for Joshua Perahia's band and their album, "Resurrection".

Since 2013, he performed with Dio Disciples, replacing former Judas Priest singer Tim "Ripper" Owens.

After singing backing vocals on Dokken's 2012 album Broken Bones and performing acoustic shows with Don Dokken for the past couple of years, Boals was announced as the new full-time Dokken bass player in November 2014 replacing Sean McNabb.

Boals also appears on an EP project from the band Metal Hell called Decadence, which includes Mark Zonder from Fates Warning.

2014 he started performing in the Las Vegas show, "Raiding the Rock Vault", as lead vocalists, and also plays guitar and bass.

2019 Boals started performing with other Las Vegas show called "Tenors of Rock".

Boals is also an occasional singer-songwriter and bassist for the band Foundry, who is produced by Linkin Park drummer Colin Brittain.

In 2025, Boals joined the melodic hard rock band Hearts On Fire and contributed to their debut album Sights & Wonders, released on July 25, 2025 by Pride & Joy Music. Two official videos accompanied the album's release, both directed, edited, and animated by Eitan Melody (EITANS DESIGNS).

== Discography ==
=== Solo releases ===
Title	Year	Format
Ignition	1998	Album
Ring of Fire	2000	Album
Edge of the World	2002	Album
All The Best!	2020	Album

=== Yngwie J. Malmsteen ===
Title	Year	Format
Trilogy	1986	Album
Inspiration	1996	Album
Alchemy	1999	Album
War to End All Wars	2000	Album

=== Foundry ===
Title	Year	Format
Thunder Rolls	2019	Single
Intoxicate	2019	Single
Not This Time	2019	Single
Another Way	2021	Single
Let You Go	2021	Single
Waiting For You	2021	Single

=== Shining Black ft. Mark Boals/Olaf Thorsen ===
Title	Year
Shining Black	2020
Postcards From The End Of The World	2022

=== Renaissance Rock Orchestra ===
Title	Year
A Song of Hope	2021

=== Maestro Alex Gregory ===
Title	Year
Paganini's Last Stand	1992

=== Billionaires Boys Club ===
Title	Year
Something Wicked Comes	1993

=== Thread ===
Title	Year
Thread	1996

=== Lana Lane ===
Title	Year
Project Shangri-La	2002

=== Erik Norlander ===
Title	Year
Music Machine	2003

=== Ring of Fire ===
Title	Year	Format
The Oracle	2001	
Burning Live in Tokyo	2002	Live album
Dreamtower	2003	
Lapse of Reality	2004	
Battle of Leningrad	2014	
Gravity	2022	

=== Empire ===
Title	Year
Hypnotica	2001

=== Genius (Rock Opera) ===
Title	Year	Notes
Part 1: A Human into Dreams' World	2002	
Part 2: In Search of the Little Prince	2004	

=== Takayoshi Ohmura ===
Title	Year
Nowhere to Go	2004

=== Lars Eric Mattsson ===
Title	Year
War	2005

=== Indigo Dying ===
Title	Year
Indigo Dying	2007

=== The Codex ===
Title	Year
The Codex	2007

=== Royal Hunt ===
Title	Year
Collision Course... Paradox 2	2008
X	2010
Dystopia	2020
Dystopia Part 2	2022

=== Uli Jon Roth ===
Title	Year	Format
Under A Dark Sky (Sky of Avalon)	2008	Album

=== Adrian Galysh ===
Title	Year
Tone Poet	2013

=== Vindictiv ===
Title	Year
Ground Zero	2009
World Of Fear	2015

=== Wolf ===
Title	Year	Notes
Ravenous	2009	backing vocals on one track

=== Seven the Hardway ===
Title	Year
Seven The Hardway	2010

=== Jayce Landberg ===
Title	Year	Format	Notes
Good Sleepless Night	2010	Album	Track 8

=== Iron Mask ===
Title	Year
Black as Death	2011
Fifth Son of Winterdoom	2013
Crimson Prophecy	2027

=== Holy Force ===
Title	Year
Holy Force	2011

=== Bogusław Balcerak's Crylord ===
Title	Year	Notes
Blood of the Prophets	2011	Tracks 4, 6, 11, 12
Gates of Valhalla	2014	Tracks 3, 9

=== Kuni ===
Title	Year
Rock	2011

=== Lyraka ===
Title	Year
Lyraka Volume 2	2012

=== Joshua Perahia ===
Title	Year
Resurrection	2012

=== Magnus Karlsson ===
Title	Year	Format	Notes
Free Fall	2013	Album	one track only

=== RavenBlack Project ===
Title	Year
Breaking Through the Mist	2013

=== Thunder Rising ===
Title	Year
Thunder Rising	2013

=== Marius Danielsen ===
Title	Year
Legend of Valley Doom	2013

=== Dramatica ===
Title	Year
Fall of Tyranny	2016

=== Vivaldi Metal Project ===
Title	Year
The Four Seasons	2016

=== Ark Storm ===
Title	Year
Voyage of the Rage	2018

=== Hearts On Fire ===
Title	Year	Format
Signs in the Sky	2025	Single
Restless Hearts	2025	Single
Sights & Wonders	2025	Album

=== Tribute albums ===
Title	Year	Format
Dragon Attack: A Tribute to Queen	1997	Album
We Will Rock You: A Tribute to Queen	2000	
Warmth in the Wilderness: A Tribute To Jason Becker	2001	
24/7/365: A Tribute To Led Zeppelin	2007	

=== Soundtracks ===
Title	Year	Format	Notes
Restless Heart (from the film "White Water Summer")	1987	Soundtrack	Recorded with Mike Slamer
