= Ring of Fire (band) =

American musical group

- Origin: Chula Vista
- Genres: Progressive metal; symphonic metal; neoclassical metal
- Years active: 2000–present
- Label: Frontiers Music
- Members: Mark Boals; Aldo Lonobile; Stefano Scola; Alfonso Mocerino
- Past members: Vitalij Kuprij; George Bellas; Steve Weingart; Philip Bynoe; Virgil Donati; Tony MacAlpine; Steve Weingart

Ring of Fire is an American progressive metal band from Chula Vista, California formed in 2000. Fronted by former Yngwie J. Malmsteen collaborator Mark Boals after the release of his solo album Ring of Fire, the band also included guitarist Tony MacAlpine, Planet X drummer Virgil Donati, grammy-award-winning bassist Philip Bynoe, and keyboardist Steve Weingart. Ring of Fire released three studio albums between 2001 and 2004, as well as a live album, Burning Live In Tokyo 2002. After disbanding, Boals, MacAlpine, and Donati later formed Seven the Hardway. Boals, MacAlpine, and keyboardist Vitalij Kuprij returned in 2014 with their fourth studio album Battle of Leningrad. On 20 February 2024, Kuprij died due to a cardiac arrest at 49 years old.

== Members ==
=== Actual ===
- Mark Boals – vocals (2001–2004, 2013–present)
- Aldo Lonobile – guitar (2022–present)
- Stefano Scola – bass (2022–present)
- Alfonso Mocerino – drums (2022–present)

=== Former members ===
- Vitalij Kuprij – keyboards (2001–2003, 2013–2024; his death)
- George Bellas – guitar (2001–2002)
- Virgil Donati – drums (2001–2004)
- Philip Bynoe – bass (2001–2004)
- Tony MacAlpine – guitar (2002–2004, 2013)
- Steve Weingart – keyboards (2004)

== Discography ==
=== Studio albums ===
- The Oracle (Avalon, 2001)
- Dreamtower (Frontiers Music, 2002)
- Lapse of Reality (King Records, 2004)
- Battle of Leningrad (Frontiers Music, 2014)
- Gravity (Frontiers Music, 2022)

=== Live album ===
- Burning Live in Tokyo 2002 (Frontiers/Marquee, 2002)

=== DVD ===
- Burning Live in Tokyo 2002 (Frontiers/Marquee, 2003)
