= Kenny Kweens =

American musician

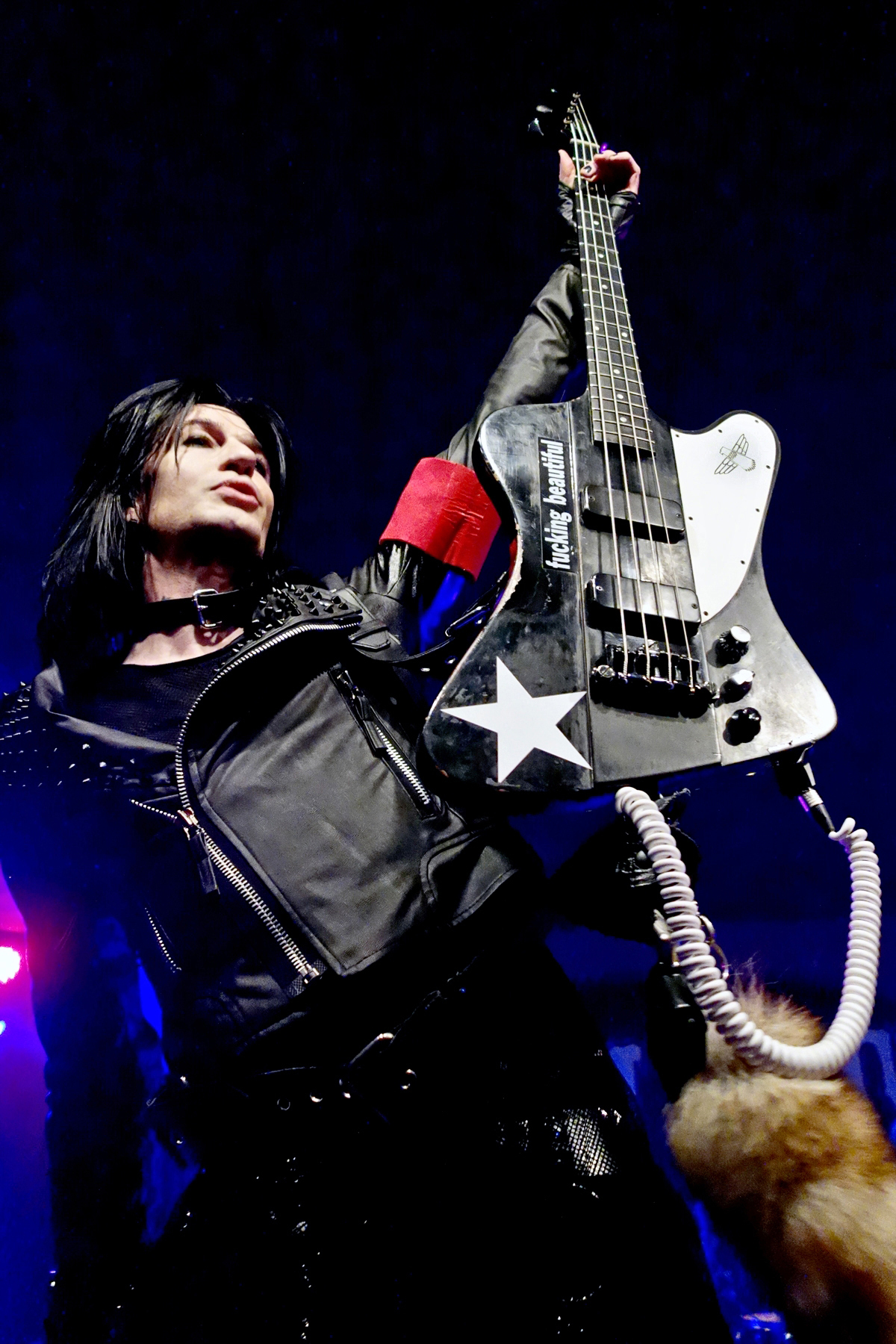
- Kweens performing

Background information
- Origin: New Orleans, LA, US
- Genres: Hard rock, heavy metal, glam metal
- Occupation(s): Musician, songwriter
- Instrument(s): Bass, guitar, vocals
- Years active: 1994–present
- Labels: Warner Bros., JVC, Spitfire, Sire, Alfa-Brunette, Hi/Fi, Perris

Kenny Kweens is an American musician. He is best known as the bassist in the hard rock band Beautiful Creatures. In 2009, Kweens also joined L.A. Guns (fronted by Phil Lewis), replacing previous bassist Scott Griffin. However, in 2011, Kweens departed, replaced by Griffin. On September 22, 2014, it was announced that Griffin had once again departed the band, and Kweens rejoined the band.

Prior to joining Beautiful Creatures, Kweens was a member of Shake the Faith, No. 9, Diamond Star Halo and Melody Black while in 2008 he formed his own solo project titled Villains of Vaudeville.

== History ==
=== Shake the Faith, No. 9 (1994–1996) ===
Kweens joined the group Shake the Faith, formed in Los Angeles, California by singer David Aragon in 1994, which featured former Black 'n Blue and current Kiss guitarist Tommy Thayer. They released one album, America the Violent in 1994. The group changed their name to No. 9 and recorded a CD for Hi/Fi/Sire Records titled Greatest Hits which was bought out by Geffen, however the group disbanded before its release.

Both groups had music featured on television shows such as The Real World, Road Rules, Buffy the Vampire Slayer and Mad About You.

=== Beautiful Creatures (2000–present) ===
In 1999, BulletBoys guitarist DJ Ashba and Bang Tango singer Joe Lesté formed Beautiful Creatures adding Kweens, guitarist Anthony Focx and drummer Glen Sobel. The group released Beautiful Creatures in 2001 through Warner Bros., and, after some lineup changes, Deuce in 2005 through JVC/Spitfire Records. In 2017, Beautiful Creatures released Deuce Deluxe, a remixed record that included a new song "Get You High" along with all the imported songs released on the European and Asian versions of Deuce.

Beautiful Creatures also toured and supported and number of acts such as Kiss, Genitorturers, Stephen Pearcy of Ratt, Faster Pussycat while they have also performed at festivals such as Ozzfest and Rocklahoma.

A number of songs by the group have featured on soundtracks for films such as Valentine, Rollerball, The Proposal and also television series such as Smallville and Sons of Anarchy.

=== Villains of Vaudeville (2008–present) ===
In 2008, Kenny Kweens moved to center mic as a vocalist to front his own project, Villains of Vaudeville. In 2013, Villains of Vaudeville released Villains De Vaudeville a 10-song full-length record produced by Tracy Swider, (Hate Times Nine). Villains of Vaudeville released 3 videos from that record "The Devil Is Waiting", "Demolition Baby" and "Black Heart Saints". On New Year's Eve December 31, 2021 Villains of Vaudeville released a 4-song EP titled, Sex, Drugs & The Devil's Music the tracks were produced and mixed by Lonny Paul and mastered by Anthony Focx (Beautiful Creatures).

=== L.A. Guns (2009–2011, 2014–2017) ===
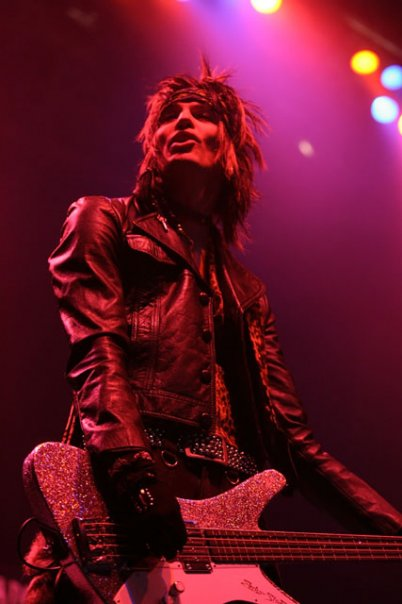
Kweens performing in 2011

In July 2009, Kweens was announced as the replacement for the departed Scott Griffin in the Phil Lewis fronted L.A. Guns. In January 2011, Kweens departed the band, with Griffin returning to the lineup.

On September 22, 2014, it was announced that Griffin had once again departed the band, and Kweens rejoined the band.

On October 13, 2017, L.A. Guns releases The Missing Peace record, the song 'The Devil Made Me Do It' is co-written by Kweens.

== Discography ==
Shake the Faith

- America the Violent (1994)

Beautiful Creatures

- Beautiful Creatures (2001)
- Deuce (2005)
- Deuce Deluxe (2017)

Villains of Vaudeville

- Villains De Vaudeville (2013)
- Sex, Drugs & The Devil's Music (2021)
