= Lapse of Reality =

Studio album by Ring of Fire
- Released: 20 September 2004
- Genres: Progressive metal, symphonic metal, neoclassical metal
- Length: 68:44
- Label: Frontiers Music

Ring of Fire chronology
| Burning Live in Tokyo 2002 (2002) | Lapse of Reality (2004) | Battle of Leningrad (2014) |

Lapse of Reality is the third album by the American progressive metal band Ring of Fire.

The album was released on 20 September 2004. Blabbermouth reported that Ring of Fire would publish on the Japanese label King Records. With their previous studio album Dreamtower, Ring of Fire had toured Japan and also made a live album from the tour, Burning Live in Tokyo 2002. However, the album came out on Frontiers Music.

== Reception ==
Rock Hard saw the album as very good, giving a score as high as 9 out of 10. Metal Express Radio gave an overall review score of A—the guitars being the best followed by the vocals and the keys. However, the reviewer also noted flaws in the vocals; "Boals tries to hit some high notes that end up sounding very strained". Nonetheless, Lapse of Reality was "possibly one of the best releases of 2004".

Norway's Scream Magazine only scored the album a 3 out of 6, arguing that Ring of Fire should consider slowing down the rate at which they released albums. Though Boals sang and MacAlpine played guitar well—at times Boals showed brilliance—the "songs are not nearly as exciting and catchy as those on, say, Dreamtower". Ring of Fire should show more creativity. Vampster also regarded the album as weak, beginning their review: "Another missed opportunity. It's sometimes quite depressing. A group of highly talented musicians come together, decide to start a project, and then the result is sometimes a work whose musical content is often only comprehensible to the protagonists". The reviewer found the album "half-hearted", where the diverse musicians had not been able to find common ground: "How on earth do these guys come up with the idea of recording melodic metal with fantasy themes?". There were exceptions, as "Perfect World" and "Machine" were tracks where the band hit what they aimed for. Moreover, the sound quality was "acceptable".

== Track listing ==
| No. | Title | Length |
|---|---|---|
| 1. | "Lapse of Reality" | 4:42 |
| 2. | "Saint Fire" | 4:54 |
| 3. | "Change" | 4:45 |
| 4. | "That Kind of Man" | 5:00 |
| 5. | "You Were There" | 5:28 |
| 6. | "Perfect World" | 5:31 |
| 7. | "Machine" | 4:23 |
| 8. | "The Key" | 5:32 |
| 9. | "Don't Know (What You're Talking About)" | 4:39 |
| 10. | "One Little Mystery" | 5:38 |
| 11. | "Darkfall" | 5:31 |
| 12. | "Faithfully" | 6:53 |
| 13. | "Lapse of Reality (Long Version)" | 5:48 |

== Personnel ==
- Mark Boals: vocals, bass
- Tony MacAlpine: guitar
- Philip Bynoe: bass
- Virgil Donati: drums
- Steve Weingart: keyboards
