= Maximum Security (Tony MacAlpine album) =

Studio album by Tony MacAlpine
- Released: 1987
- Studio: Prairie Sun Recording Studios (Cotati, California)
- Genre: Instrumental rock, neoclassical metal
- Length: 38:53
- Label: PolyGram
- Producer: Mike Varney

Tony MacAlpine chronology
Edge of Insanity (1986)	Maximum Security (1987)	Eyes of the World (1990)

Maximum Security is the second studio album by guitarist Tony MacAlpine, released in 1987 through PolyGram.

It is his only release to enter the U.S. Billboard 200, reaching No. 146 and remaining on that chart for eleven weeks.

== Critical reception ==
Professional ratings
Review scores
Source	Rating
AllMusic	4.5/5 stars

Andy Hinds at AllMusic gave Maximum Security 4.5 stars out of 5, calling it "much better" than MacAlpine's 1986 debut album Edge of Insanity, and "essential listening for anyone interested in instrumental guitar music"; its "captivating neoclassical/fusion forays are filled with plenty of beautiful melodies and hair-raising solos".

== Track listing ==
All music is composed by Tony MacAlpine, except where noted.

No.	Title	Length
1.	"Autumn Lords"	3:26
2.	"Hundreds of Thousands"	3:15
3.	"Tears of Sahara"	3:46
4.	"Key to the City"	4:38
5.	"The Time and the Test"	2:39
6.	"The King's Cup"	3:27
7.	"Sacred Wonder"	4:13
8.	"Etude #4 Opus #10" (Frédéric Chopin)	2:05
9.	"The Vision"	3:30
10.	"Dreamstate"	3:28
11.	"Porcelain Doll"	4:26
Total length:		38:53

== Personnel ==
- Tony MacAlpine – guitar, keyboard, bass
- George Lynch – additional guitar solos (tracks 3, 9)
- Jeff Watson – additional guitar solos (track 6)
- Mike Mani – keyboard programming
- Deen Castronovo – drums (tracks 1–3, 5, 6)
- Atma Anur – drums (tracks 4, 7, 9–11)
- Steve Fontano – engineering
- Dino Alden – engineering assistance
- George Horn – mastering
- Mike Varney – production

== Chart performance ==
Year	Chart	Position
1987	Billboard 200	146
