= Concrete Gardens =

Studio album by Tony MacAlpine
- Released: April 21, 2015
- Studio: Tony MacAlpine's home studio (Pasadena, California)
- Genre: Instrumental rock, progressive metal
- Length: 59:16
- Label: Sun Dog
- Producer: Tony MacAlpine, Michael Mesker

Tony MacAlpine chronology
Tony MacAlpine (2011)	Concrete Gardens (2015)	Death of Roses (2017)

Concrete Gardens is the eleventh studio album by guitarist Tony MacAlpine, released on April 21, 2015, through Sun Dog Records. The album was first announced by MacAlpine on his official website in October 2013, with more details in February and December 2014. An official release date was announced in March 2015, along with the cover art, different editions of the album, and a U.S. tour schedule. To further promote Concrete Gardens, a series of live studio performances of several songs were filmed for EMGtv, featuring guitarist Nili Brosh, drummer Aquiles Priester, and bassist Pete Griffin. Guitarist Jeff Loomis is featured as a guest soloist on "Square Circles".

== Critical reception ==
Professional ratings
Review scores
Source	Rating
Brave Words & Bloody Knuckles	8.0

Aaron Small at Brave Words & Bloody Knuckles gave Concrete Gardens a rating of 8.0, praising MacAlpine's skill at creating instrumental melodies in place of lyrics, "thereby building unique songs full of colourful character." He listed "Exhibitionist Blvd", "Man in a Metal Cage", "Napoleon's Puppet" and "Confessions of a Medieval Monument" as highlights, but criticism was directed at the final track, the instrumental piano piece "Maiden's Wish", for sounding out of place on the album and more appropriate for the early 1900s silent film era.

== Track listing ==
No.	Title	Length
1.	"Exhibitionist Blvd"	4:28
2.	"The King's Rhapsody"	4:45
3.	"Man in a Metal Cage"	4:20
4.	"Poison Cookies"	5:06
5.	"Epic"	5:00
6.	"Napoleon's Puppet"	5:13
7.	"Sierra Morena"	4:52
8.	"Square Circles"	5:12
9.	"Red Giant"	5:10
10.	"Confessions of a Medieval Monument"	5:43
11.	"Concrete Gardens"	5:03
12.	"Maiden's Wish"	4:19
Total length:		59:16

== Personnel ==
- Tony MacAlpine – guitar, keyboard, bass (tracks 2, 3, 5, 10), production
- Jeff Loomis – guitar solo (track 8)
- Aquiles Priester – drums
- Pete Griffin – bass (tracks 1, 4, 6–8)
- Lucky Islam – bass (track 9)
- Sean Delson – bass (track 11)
- Adair Daufembach – mixing
- Seva David Ball – mastering
- Michael Mesker – executive production
