= Diamonds Unlocked =

Studio album
- Released: 1 October 2007
- Recorded: April–June 2007
- Genre: Heavy metal, hard rock, speed metal
- Label: Steamhammer/SPV

chronology
Mystica (2006)	Diamonds Unlocked (2007)	Tales of the Crown (2008)

Professional ratings
Review scores
Source	Rating
AllMusic	3/5 stars
Jukebox:Metal	3/5 stars

Diamonds Unlocked is the twelfth album by German guitarist Axel Rudi Pell. It is a cover album released in September/October 2007. The album consists of 10 cover tracks and 1 self-written introduction track. Axel Rudi Pell attempted to make cover versions of tracks from typically "non-metal" artists including Phil Collins and Michael Bolton in order to show how these songs would be done in his signature melodic rock/metal style.

== Track listing ==
1. "The Diamond Overture" (Axel Rudi Pell) - 1:41
2. "Warrior" (Riot) - 3:42
3. "Beautiful Day" (U2) - 4:46
4. "Stone" (Chris Rea) - 6:36
5. "Love Gun" (Kiss) - 4:04
6. "Fools Game" (Michael Bolton) - 3:58
7. "Heartbreaker" (Free) - 6:55
8. "Rock the Nation" (Montrose) - 4:05
9. "In the Air Tonight" (Phil Collins) - 8:38
10. "Like a Child Again" (The Mission) - 4:48
11. "Won't Get Fooled Again" (The Who) - 6:12

Charts:

- Germany No. 60
- Switzerland No. 81

== Personnel ==
- Axel Rudi Pell - guitars
- Johnny Gioeli - vocals
- Ferdy Doernberg - keyboards, acoustic guitar on "Love Gun"
- Volker Krawczak - bass guitar, acoustic guitar on "Love Gun"
- Mike Terrana - drums, percussion
