= Live Insanity =

Live album by Tony MacAlpine
- Released: 1997
- Recorded: October 4, 1997
- Venue: The Roxy Theatre (West Hollywood, California)
- Genre: Instrumental rock, neoclassical metal
- Length: 49:50
- Label: Victor
- Producer: Tony MacAlpine

Tony MacAlpine chronology
Violent Machine (1996)	Live Insanity (1997)	Master of Paradise (1999)

Alternative cover
- 2002 reissue

Professional ratings
Review scores
Source	Rating
AllMusic	3.5/5 stars

Live Insanity is a live album by guitarist Tony MacAlpine, released in 1997 through Victor Entertainment and reissued on June 4, 2002 through Lion Music; the latter featuring different cover art and having apparently been released through license from Mike Terrana.

== Track listing ==
All music is composed by Tony MacAlpine, except where noted.

No.	Title	Length
1.	"The Vision"	5:02
2.	"The Sage"	4:45
3.	"Sacred Wonder"	4:19
4.	"Box Office Poison/Piano Solo" (MacAlpine, Frédéric Chopin)	11:11
5.	"Rusalka"	7:10
6.	"Carolina Blue"	4:47
7.	"Stream Dream"	4:40
8.	"King's Cup"	4:24
9.	"The Taker"	3:32
Total length:		49:50

== Personnel ==
- Tony MacAlpine – guitar, keyboard, production
- Mike Terrana – drums
- Ricky Riccardo – bass
