= Beautiful Creatures (album) =

Studio album by Beautiful Creatures
- Released: August 16, 2001
- Recorded: 2000–2001
- Studio: Bay 7 Studios, Valley Village, Los Angeles, California
- Genre: Hard rock; glam metal
- Length: 44:29
- Label: Warner Bros.
- Producer: Sean Beavan

Beautiful Creatures chronology
Beautiful Creatures (2001)	Deuce (2005)

Singles from Stone Sour
- 1. "Wasted" Released: 2001

Beautiful Creatures is the debut studio album by American hard rock band Beautiful Creatures. It was produced by Sean Beavan at Bay 7 Studios in Valley Village, Los Angeles, and was released on August 16, 2001, through Warner Bros. Records. The album peaked at number 29 on the Billboard Top Heatseekers, while the single "Wasted" peaked at number 37 on the Mainstream Rock Tracks.

Following the release of the album, Beautiful Creatures went on to promote the album, performing at Ozzfest 2001, from June 8 – August 12, 2001, the Rolling Rock Tour as well performing in Japan. The album received mixed reviews.

== Background ==
Former BulletBoys guitarist DJ Ashba and Bang Tango vocalist Joe LeSte first formed Beautiful Creatures, initially as Ego Star, in 1999. After adding bassist Kenny Kweens, guitarist Anthony Focx and drummer Glen Sobel, the band opened for Kiss during their reunion tour and, after one show, changed their name to Beautiful Creatures. After signing with Warner Bros. Records, the band began recording their album with producer Sean Beavan at Bay 7 Studios, Valley Village, Los Angeles, California.

== Critical reception ==
Professional ratings
Review scores
Source	Rating
Allmusic	3/5 stars
Canoe.ca	favorable
Exclaim!	favorable
PopMatters	mixed

Beautiful Creatures received generally mixed reviews upon release. Reviewing the album for AllMusic, Tom Semioli complimented on their "overwhelming appeal [that] lies in their command of traditional pop/rock songcraft bolstered by expert musicianship" and that "the songs found on this self-titled first offering would be praiseworthy in any genre."

Mike Bell of Canoe.ca stated the band were similar to Guns N' Roses and that they were "borrowing unapologetically and gluttonously from the Big Book of Rock Cliches." However, he also felt that "there's still something to them that you can't help but enjoy."

Exclaim! reviewer Craig Daniels stated that "the opening song, "1 A.M.," could easily be mistaken for vintage G'n'R, and actually stands alone as a pretty solid little rocker" and that LeSte "alternates from an AC/DC growl to an Axl howl."

Andrew Ellis, reviewing for PopMatters, described the album as "a rough and ready collection of uninspiring rockers, old school guitar licks and gravelly vocals" that "attempts to merge the aggression, street sass and sound of the incomparable Appetite for Destruction with the modern leanings of the contemporary rock scene." Though he states that "there's plenty of effort and determination shown by the band on solid rockers like "1 AM" and "Kick Out"" there was a "distinct lack of originality throughout the album."

=== Accolades ===
Publication	Country	Accolade	Year	Rank
Metal Hammer	United Kingdom	Top Albums of 2001	2001	11

== Track listing ==
All tracks are written by DJ Ashba and Joe LeSte, except where noted.

No.	Title	Writer(s)	Length
1.	"1 A.M."	Ashba, LeSte, Jeff Blue	3:25
2.	"Wasted"	Ashba, LeSte, Blue	3:28
3.	"Step Back"	Ashba, LeSte, Blue	3:20
4.	"Ride"		3:10
5.	"Wish"	Ashba, LeSte, Blue	4:23
6.	"Kick Out"		3:35
7.	"Blacklist"	Ashba, LeSte, Kenny Kweens	3:40
8.	"Kickin' For Days"		4:48
9.	"Time and Time Again"	Ashba, LeSte, Blue	4:12
10.	"Goin' Off"	Ashba, LeSte, Blue	3:43
11.	"New Orleans"		4:01
12.	"I Got It All"	Ashba, LeSte, Kweens	2:44
Total length:			44:29

== Charts ==
Chart (2009)	Peak Position
U.S. Billboard Top Heatseekers	29

== Personnel ==
All information is excerpted from the album's stated information and Allmusic.

=== Beautiful Creatures ===
- Joe LeSte – lead vocals, backing vocals
- DJ Ashba – lead guitar, rhythm guitar, acoustic guitar, backing vocals
- Anthony Focx – rhythm guitar, backing vocals
- Kenny Kweens – bass, backing vocals
- Glen Sobel – drums, backing vocals

=== Production ===
- Sean Beavan – producer, engineer, mixer
- Ed Roth – producer, keyboard
- Matt Ellingsen – engineer
- Eric Miller – engineer
- Jim Monti – assistant engineer
- Daniel M. Serta – assistant engineer
- Ted Jensen – mastering
- Jeff Blue – A&R
- Natalie Preston – A&R coordination
- Frank Maddocks – art direction, design
- James Minchin III – photography
- Melanie Nissen – photography
