= Beautiful Creatures (band) =

American rock band

- Origin: Los Angeles, California, U.S.
- Genres: Hard rock, glam metal, post-grunge
- Years active: 1999–2010, 2016–present
- Labels: Warner Bros., Spitfire, Perris
- Members: Joe Lesté; Anthony Focx; Kenny Kweens; Alex Grossi; Timmy Russell
- Past members: DJ Ashba; Glen Sobel; Michael Thomas; Matt Starr; Mark Simpson

Beautiful Creatures (sometimes abbreviated as BC) is an American hard rock band formed in 1999 by guitarist DJ Ashba and singer Joe Lesté of Bang Tango. The group's current lineup is composed of Lesté (lead vocals), Alex Grossi (lead guitar), Anthony Focx (rhythm guitar), Kenny Kweens (bass) and Timmy Russell (drums). Previously the group featured Michael Thomas and Glen Sobel among others while founder DJ Ashba is currently the lead guitarist for Sixx:A.M.

To date, Beautiful Creatures have released two albums – Beautiful Creatures (2001); Deuce (2005) and have had songs featured on soundtracks for films such as Valentine, Rollerball, The Proposal and also for television series such as Smallville and Sons of Anarchy.

== History ==
=== Formation and debut album (1999–2002) ===
In 1999, BulletBoys guitarist DJ Ashba and Bang Tango singer Joe Lesté formed the group adding former Shake The Faith bassist Kenny Kweens along with session drummer Anthony Focx. Focx eventually became the group's second guitarist with Glen Sobel, another session drummer, being brought in to replace him. This would be the first lineup under the moniker Beautiful Creatures. Prior to naming, the band opened one show in Houston, Texas, for Kiss during their reunion tour after Ted Nugent pulled out, performing with the name Hellstar. The band were given two more support slots in Detroit and East Lansing then entered the studio to record material for their debut album. The band were then signed to Warner Bros. and released self-titled debut Beautiful Creatures, produced by Marilyn Manson cohort Sean Beavan, on August 14, 2001. The album charted at number 38 on the Billboard Top Heatseekers while the single "Wasted" peaked at number 37 on the Mainstream Rock Chart. The band were added to the 2001 Ozzfest lineup playing from June 8 through to August 12 as well as the Rolling Rock Tour and later toured Japan. Album track 1 A.M. was featured in the soundtrack for the 2001 horror film Valentine and TV series Smallville. Ride was featured on the soundtrack to the 2002 remake of Rollerball. After the merger between Time Warner and AOL earlier in the year the band were eventually dropped after shake ups at the record label and abysmal record sales. By the end of 2001, the album had sold 25,490 copies.

=== Ashba and Sobel depart (2002) ===
On February 13, 2002, the band announced that Beautiful Creatures founder Dj ASHBA had left the group but that the band would find a replacement and continue on. Ashba released a statement showing that he left the band on good terms and that fans should welcome "the new addition to the band with open arms." Little over a month later, guitarist Michael Thomas had left to join Beautiful Creatures as the replacement to the recently departed Ashba. However, Thomas left the band in April 2003 to tour with Suki Jones (the first incarnation of Adler's Appetite) as a temporary replacement for Brent Muscat who was touring with Faster Pussycat. Thomas then joined former BC guitarist DJ Ashba's solo band simply titled ASHBA. Drummer Glen Sobel also departed the group and joined the backing band of singer/rapper Brooks Buford along with former members of Killgore and members of Hate Machine, Omniblank, Rehab and Tommy Lee's solo band.

=== Deuce (2003–2006) ===
Despite the losses the band regrouped adding lead guitarist Alex Grossi and drummer Matt Starr and began recording material for the follow-up to their self-titled debut. Produced and mixed by guitarist Anthony Focx, with additional by bass guitar Kenny Kweens, the band were to release second album Deuce on Japanese label JVC in 2004 with a US release due in early 2005 but the album was not released until April 21, 2005, in Japan and after signing with Spitfire Records the album was released in the US on August 23, 2005. By this point, guitarist Grossi had departed the band to join the new lineup of Quiet Riot and was replaced by Michael Thomas briefly and then by former Flotsam and Jetsam guitarist Mark Simpson. Drummer Starr was also replaced by Bang Tango drummer Timmy Russell. To support the album, that band announced a fall tour with industrial metal band The Genitorturers. After signing a deal with Perris Records for a European release of Deuce in 2006, the band embarked on a UK headlining tour with Stephen Pearcy of Ratt.

=== New album and recent events (2007–present) ===
In October 2007, frontman Lesté announced that the band were planning a new album as well as a European tour in January 2008:

'Rumors of a Beautiful Creatures European Tour for January 2008 [are] true. Dates will be announced soon. A new Beautiful Creatures CD is also a rumor to be true. Although no music at this time has been written or recorded, plans are being made for the band's third CD.'

Also in 2007, former guitarist DJ Ashba released the critically acclaimed album The Heroin Diaries Soundtrack after collaborating with Mötley Crüe bassist Nikki Sixx and producer James Michael under the name Sixx:A.M. in August 2007 serving as a soundtrack to Sixx's autobiography The Heroin Diaries: A Year in the Life of a Shattered Rock Star. The single Life is Beautiful reached No. 2 on the Billboard Hot Mainstream Rock Tracks. Former BC drummer Glen Sobel filled in as drummer for the group's live shows.

In early 2008, bassist Kenny Kweens started his own project titled Villains of Vaudeville with 3 songs posted online.

The band played a show on Valentine's Day with Faster Pussycat then in April were announced as one of the acts appearing at Rocklahoma 2008 on Sunday, July 13.

On October 8, 2008, the song "Anyone" from album Deuce was heard on the FX television series Sons of Anarchy after being licensed by the network.

In March 2009, drummer Timmy Russell departed the band to join Burn Halo fronted by former Eighteen Visions frontman James Hart. On March 24, it was announced that the song Freedom from Deuce would appear in the romantic comedy film The Proposal, starring Sandra Bullock and Ryan Reynolds, as well as on the official soundtrack. Also in March, Sixx:A.M. and former BC guitarist DJ Ashba was announced as the new guitarist for Guns N' Roses replacing Robin Finck, who had left the band to rejoin Nine Inch Nails.

On July 5, Kenny Kweens replaced the departed Scott Griffin in the Phil Lewis fronted L.A. Guns but still played with BC at the 3rd annual Rocklahoma. The last known documented lineup of Beautiful Creatures consists of Joe Leste on Vocals; Delta Starr on Guitar; Anthony Focx on Guitar; Kenny Kweens on Bass; and Justin Sandler on Drums. Bang Tango bassist Lance Eric has filled in for gigs on Bass as well.

On Nov 25, Joe Lesté collapsed on stage during a Bang Tango show in Chicago. This prompted numerous online rumours that the singer was "on his deathbed" but these were soon quashed by guitarist Alex Grossi:

'In response to the dozens of phone calls, text messages and e-mails regarding Joe LeSte, I would like to squash any rumors that he is dead or even close to it. Joe was indeed taken to the hospital on Wednesday evening right before a Bang Tango performance that was set to take place at The Portage Theater in Chicago. Without going into detail, I can tell you, without reservation that Joe is very much is alive and well and recovering in Chicago as I type this. We would like to thank everyone that came out to the shows during the past 2 weeks.'

Grossi then issued another update on Lesté's condition:

'I spoke with Joe yesterday and he sounded better. Essentially what happened was he went off his blood pressure medication last Monday, and by Wednesday his blood pressure spiked into stroke territory, that is when he went to the hospital. They have since stabilized him and are finishing up their tests today to make sure he is ok to fly home.'

In February 2017 it was officially announced that Beautiful Creatures had reformed with Leste, Focx. Kweens, Grossi and Russell and that they would be re-releasing their second album Deuce in a deluxed edition that will be remastered and remixed with bonus tracks.

== Musical style ==
AllMusic described the band's style as "hair dye and a mix of glammy hooks with gritty, hard-hitting post-grunge rock", and as heavily influenced by "metal, hard rock, and arena rock of the '70s and '80s".

== Discography ==
Studio albums

- Beautiful Creatures (2001)
- Deuce (2005)

== Members ==
=== Current ===
- Joe Lesté – vocals (1999–2010; 2016–present)
- Anthony Focx – rhythm guitar, drums (1999–2010; 2016–present)
- Kenny Kweens – bass (1999–2009; 2016–present)
- Alex Grossi – lead guitar (2003-2005-2008-2009; 2016-present)
- Timmy Russell – drums (2005–2009; 2016–present)

=== Former ===
- DJ Ashba – lead guitar (1999–2002)
- Glen Sobel – drums (1999–2003)
- Michael Thomas – lead guitar (2002–2003, 2005, 2007–2008)
- Matt Starr – drums (2003–2005)
- Mark Simpson – lead guitar (2005–2007)
