= Tales of the Crown =

Studio album by Axel Rudi Pell
- Released: 24 October 2008
- Genre: Heavy metal, hard rock, power metal
- Label: Steamhammer/SPV
- Producer: Axel Rudi Pell & Charlie Bauerfeind

Axel Rudi Pell chronology
Diamonds Unlocked (2007)	Tales of the Crown (2008)	The Crest (2010)

Professional ratings
Review scores
Source	Rating
Allmusic	link
Globaldomination	link
Jukebox:Metal	link
Metal Storm	link
Revelationz	link

Tales of the Crown is the thirteenth album by German speed/power metal guitarist Axel Rudi Pell. It released on 24 October 2008 by Steamhammer/SPV records. The album was #56 on the Sweden charts and #81 on the Switzerland charts.

== Track listing ==
All songs by Axel Rudi Pell.

1. "Higher" - 7:18
2. "Ain't Gonna Win" - 4:52
3. "Angel Eyes" - 4:58
4. "Crossfire" - 5:22
5. "Touching My Soul" - 6:32
6. "Emotional Echoes" - 5:07
7. "Riding on an Arrow" - 5:55
8. "Tales of the Crown" - 8:21
9. "Buried Alive" - 5:42
10. "Northern Lights" - 6:22

== Personnel ==
- Johnny Gioeli - Vocals
- Axel Rudi Pell - Guitar
- Volker Krawczak - Bass
- Mike Terrana - Drums
- Ferdy Doernberg - Keyboards

== Release history ==
- Germany / Austria / Switzerland - October 24, 2008
- Europe - October 27, 2008
- Spain / Portugal / France / UK - November 3
- USA - November 4, 2008
