= Shadow Zone (Axel Rudi Pell album) =

Studio album by Axel Rudi Pell
- Released: 29 April 2002
- Studio: Redhouse Studio
- Genre: Heavy metal, hard rock, power metal
- Length: 61:24
- Label: SPV GmbH
- Producer: Ulrich Pösselt; Axel Rudi Pell

Axel Rudi Pell chronology
The Masquerade Ball (2000)	Shadow Zone (2002)	Kings and Queens (2004)

Professional ratings
Review scores
Source	Rating
AllMusic	4/5 stars

Shadow Zone is the ninth studio album released by the heavy metal guitarist Axel Rudi Pell, as well as the second album released by the current line-up. The album was released in 2002 by SPV.

== Track listing ==
All songs by Axel Rudi Pell.

1. "The Curse of the Chains" (Intro) - 1:26
2. "Edge of the World" - 5:19
3. "Coming Home" - 7:04
4. "Live for the King" - 8:15
5. "All the Rest of My Life" - 8:05
6. "Follow the Sign" - 4:29
7. "Time of the Truth" - 8:20
8. "Heartbreaker" - 6:43
9. "Saint of Fools" - 5:00
10. "Under the Gun" - 6:48

== Personnel ==
- Axel Rudi Pell - guitar
- Johnny Gioeli - vocals
- Ferdy Doernberg - keyboards
- Volker Krawczak - bass
- Mike Terrana - drums
