= Eyes of the World (album) =

Studio album by MacAlpine
- Released: 1990
- Recorded: June 21 – November 13, 1989
- Studio: Fantasy Studios (Berkeley, California); Prairie Sun Recording Studios (Cotati, California)
- Genre: Hard rock, glam metal
- Length: 51:25
- Label: PolyGram
- Producer: Tony MacAlpine, Steve Fontano

MacAlpine chronology
Maximum Security (1987)	Eyes of the World (1990)	Freedom to Fly (1992)

Professional ratings
Review scores
Source	Rating
AllMusic	(No review)

Eyes of the World is a studio album by the band MacAlpine, released in 1990 through PolyGram. MacAlpine was a short-lived project by guitarist Tony MacAlpine, and the album is a departure from his previous work in that it is more commercially oriented, with none of his usual instrumental tracks in the style of neoclassical metal or piano études. According to MacAlpine himself, the project was indeed an attempt to emulate other hard rock acts at the time.

== Track listing ==
No.	Title	Lyrics	Music	Length
1.	"The World We Live In"	Alan Sehorn, Steve Fontano	Tony MacAlpine	4:06
2.	"The Hard Way"	Sehorn, Fontano	MacAlpine	4:14
3.	"Escape the Hell"	Sehorn	MacAlpine	5:00
4.	"Heartache Calling"	Sehorn	MacAlpine	5:07
5.	"Tear It Down"	Sehorn, Fontano	MacAlpine	4:40
6.	"Take Me Back"	MacAlpine	Sehorn	4:47
7.	"Wild Ride"	Sehorn, Fontano	MacAlpine	3:39
8.	"Cry a Tear"	Gina Demos	MacAlpine	4:48
9.	"Wrong to Love"	Demos	MacAlpine	5:31
10.	"Summer's Gone"	Demos	MacAlpine	4:33
11.	"Urban Days"	Sehorn	MacAlpine	5:00
Total length:				51:25

== Personnel ==
- Tony MacAlpine – guitar, keyboard, keyboard bass, keyboard programming, drum programming, percussion, production
- Alan Sehorn – lead vocals
- Mark Robertson – keyboard, vocals
- Mike Mani – keyboard programming, drum programming
- Billy Carmassi – drums (except tracks 3, 8, 11)
- Bill Zampa – drums (tracks 3, 8, 11)
- Mike Jacques – bass (track 1), vocals
- Randy Jackson – bass (tracks 2, 4, 9, 10)
- Juan Alderete – bass (tracks 3, 5–8, 11)
- Alan Lornie – violin
- Maria Khodorkosky – violin
- Maxine Prolman – violin
- Steve Fontano – tambourine, background vocals, keyboard programming, drum programming, engineering, mixing, production
- Kevin Chalfant – background vocals
- Bret Douglas – background vocals
- Melisa Kary – background vocals
- Christina Saxton – background vocals
- Davey Pattison – background vocals
- Tracy Hill – spoken vocals
- Neill King – engineering
- Wally Buck – engineering
- Jimmy Robinson – engineering
- Bob Misbach – engineering
- Michael Semanick – engineering
- Dave Luke – engineering
- Joe Marquez – engineering
- Mark Rayburn – engineering
- Michael Rosen – mixing
