= Bunny Brunel =

French-American jazz fusion musician (born 1950)

- Also known as: Bunny Brunel
- Born: Bernard Brunel; March 2, 1950 (age 76); Nice, France
- Genres: Jazz, jazz fusion
- Occupations: Bass guitarist, composer, arranger, producer
- Instrument: Bass guitar
- Years active: 1970–present
- Member of: CAB
- Website: bunnybrunelofficial.com

Bernard "Bunny" Brunel is a French-American bassist, composer, arranger, producer, and instrument designer best known for his work in jazz and jazz fusion. During a career spanning more than five decades, he has performed and recorded with musicians including Chick Corea, Herbie Hancock, Wayne Shorter, Tony Williams, Jack DeJohnette, Al Jarreau, Natalie Cole, Stevie Wonder, Dizzy Gillespie, Gloria Estefan, and Larry Coryell.

Brunel relocated from France to the United States in the late 1970s after Chick Corea hired him to record on the album Secret Agent, beginning a musical association that lasted nearly a decade. Since then he has maintained parallel careers as a solo recording artist, session musician, composer for film and television, educator, and designer of electric bass instruments. He is also a founding member of the jazz fusion band CAB.

== Early life and education ==
Brunel was born in Nice, France. He began studying solfège at the age of six and piano at age nine. Although he initially attended the École Hôtelière de Nice with the intention of pursuing a culinary career, his interests shifted toward music after discovering the bass guitar at age fifteen.

Largely self-taught as a bassist, Brunel supplemented his studies with approximately three months of instruction in arco (bowed) double bass technique at the Conservatory of Nice. He has cited acoustic bassists Ray Brown, Sam Jones, Ron Carter, Eddie Gómez, Miroslav Vitouš, and Stanley Clarke among his principal early influences.

== Discography ==
=== As leader ===
- Touch (Warner Bros., 1979)
- Ivanhoe (Inner City, 1982)
- Momentum (America, 1989)
- Dedication (Musidisc, 1992)
- For You to Play (Media 7, 1994)
- Bunny Brunel's L.A. Zoo (Tone Center, 1998)
- Led Boots (Mascot, 2000)
- Cafe Au Lait (Brunel Music, 2004)
- Touch (Nikaia, 2006)
- Invent Your Future (Nikaia, 2015)
- Bass Ball (2017)
- Bass Ball 2 (2023)

With CAB

- CAB (Tone Center, 2000)
- CAB 2 (Tone Center, 2000)
- Live (2002)
- CAB 4 (Favored Nations, 2003)
- Theatre de Marionnettes (2009)
- Live On Sunset (Nikaia, 2011)
- "Fusion Holidays", featuring Roman Miroshnichenko, Virgil Donati, Kaylene Peoples, Mahesh Balasooriya (Nikaia, 2022).

=== As sideman ===
With Allen Vizzutti

- Allen Vizzutti (Headfirst, 1981)
- Skyrocket (Overseas, 1981)
- Olympic Jazz Series (Domo, 1999)

With others

- Jan Akkerman, Jan Akkerman 3 (Atlantic, 1979)
- Sandeep Chowta, Matters of the Heart (Sony 2013)
- Chick Corea, Secret Agent (1978)
- Chick Corea, Tap Step (Warner Bros., 1980)
- Christine Delaroche, Au Feminin (Eurodisc, 1978)
- Osamu Kitajima, Dragon King (Arista, 1981)
- Didier Lockwood, Lockwood (1975)
- Kathi McDonald, Above & Beyond (Merrimack, 1999)
- Gayle Moran, I Loved You Then...I Love You Now (Warner Bros., 1979)
- Georges Moustaki, Live (Polydor, 1975)
- Georges Moustaki, Olympia (Polydor, 1978)
- Claude Nougaro, Pacifique (WEA, 1998)
- Michel Polnareff, Ze Tour (Enough/Universal 2007)
- Kazumi Watanabe, Kilowatt (Gramavision, 1989)
