= Evolution (Tony MacAlpine album) =

Studio album by Tony MacAlpine
- Released: October 10, 1995
- Recorded: July 1995
- Studio: Prairie Sun Recording Studios (Cotati, California)
- Genre: Instrumental rock
- Length: 54:36
- Label: Shrapnel
- Producer: Tony MacAlpine, Steve Fontano

Tony MacAlpine chronology
Premonition (1994)	Evolution (1995)	Violent Machine (1996)

Evolution is the sixth studio album by guitarist Tony MacAlpine, released on October 10, 1995 through Shrapnel Records.

== Critical reception ==
Professional ratings
Review scores
Source	Rating
AllMusic	4/5 stars

Robert Taylor at AllMusic gave Evolution four stars out of five, calling it a "predominantly shred-oriented session" and "one of Macalpine's more complete releases", while remarking that it provides a "promising glimpse into his more fusion-oriented endeavors he would explore with Planet X and CAB." He also noted "Time Table" and "Futurism" as highlights.

== Track listing ==
All music is composed by Tony MacAlpine, except where noted.

No.	Title	Length
1.	"The Sage"	4:48
2.	"Oversea Evolution"	4:49
3.	"Eccentrist"	5:51
4.	"Time Table"	6:20
5.	"Seville"	6:05
6.	"Futurism"	5:13
7.	"Etude H5/Opus No. 10" (Frédéric Chopin)	1:45
8.	"Powerfield"	4:18
9.	"Plastic People"	4:20
10.	"Sinfonia"	5:35
11.	"Astarias KV467No. 21 (Note: All editions besides the original Shrapnel pressing have "Astarias" spelled as "Asturias" on the back cover and liner notes.)" (Wolfgang Amadeus Mozart)	5:32
Total length:		54:36

== Personnel ==
- Tony MacAlpine – guitar, keyboard, mixing, producer
- Mike Terrana – drums
- Tony Franklin – bass
- Steve Fontano – engineering, mixing, production
- Kenneth K. Lee Jr. – mastering
