= Theatre de Marionnettes =

Studio album by CAB
- Released: October 20, 2009
- Recorded: 2008
- Studio: Gigi Studios, Laguna Niguel; North Allen Studio, Gildon Studios, North Hollywood
- Genre: Instrumental rock, jazz fusion
- Length: 59:37
- Label: Brunel
- Producer: Bunny Brunel, Tony MacAlpine

CAB chronology
CAB 4 (2003)	Theatre de Marionnettes (2009)

Theatre de Marionnettes is the fourth studio album by the band CAB, released on October 20, 2009, through Brunel Music. It marked the replacement of drummer Dennis Chambers, who performed on all previous CAB albums, with Virgil Donati.

== Track listing ==
No.	Title	Writer(s)	Length
1.	"The Prankster"	Sandeep Chowta, Bunny Brunel	5:23
2.	"Katputli"	Brunel	4:23
3.	"The Sultan of Brunel"	Chowta	3:40
4.	"Purple Mars"	Tony MacAlpine	6:02
5.	"The Ventriloquist"	MacAlpine	4:41
6.	"Just Do It"	Brunel	5:24
7.	"Rain"	MacAlpine	4:07
8.	"The Pub"	MacAlpine	4:24
9.	"Another Day"	Brunel	4:24
10.	"Jaco Rocco Circus"	Brunel	6:35
11.	"Theatre de Marionnettes"	Brunel	6:07
12.	"High Cloud"	Brunel	4:27
Total length:			59:37

Bonus track
No.	Title	Writer(s)	Length
13.	"The Puppeteer"	Brunel	6:20

== Personnel ==
- Tony MacAlpine – guitar, keyboard (tracks 4, 5, 7, 8), mixing, production
- Freddie Fox – guitar (tracks 1, 6, 10)
- Bernard Torelli – guitar (track 12), mixing, mastering
- Patrice Rushen – clavinet, keyboard (track 10), piano (tracks 11, 13)
- Bunny Brunel – keyboard (tracks 6, 9, 12), bass, mixing, production
- Sandeep Chowta – keyboard (tracks 1, 3)
- Chick Corea – electric piano
- Michel Polnareff – piano (track 6)
- Brian Auger – Hammond organ
- Virgil Donati – drums
- Jeff Elliott – trumpet
- Doug Webb – saxophone
- Tyrone Fernandes – mastering
