= CAB 2 =

Studio album by CAB
- Released: February 20, 2001
- Recorded: Warp Studio in Woodland Hills, Los Angeles; B&B Studio in Tarzana, Los Angeles
- Genre: Instrumental rock, jazz fusion
- Length: 72:10
- Label: Tone Center
- Producer: Bunny Brunel

CAB chronology
CAB (2000)	CAB 2 (2001)	CAB 4 (2003)

Professional ratings
Review scores
Source	Rating
All About Jazz	Favorable
AllMusic	4/5 stars

CAB 2 is the second studio album by the rock/jazz fusion band CAB, released on February 20, 2001 through Tone Center Records. The album was nominated for Best Contemporary Jazz Album at the 2002 Grammy Awards.

== Track listing ==
No.	Title	Music	Length
1.	"Decisions"	Bunny Brunel	9:12
2.	"Madeline"	Tony MacAlpine	8:29
3.	"Dennis"	Brunel	5:14
4.	"For Joe"	Brunel	7:11
5.	"South Side"	MacAlpine	7:25
6.	"Song for My Friend"	Brunel	4:41
7.	"Temperamental"	Brunel	9:40
8.	"Top Spin"	Brunel	8:06
9.	"Wah Wah"	Brunel	7:00
10.	"Sunday"	MacAlpine	5:12
Total length:			72:10

== Personnel ==
- Tony MacAlpine – guitar, keyboard
- Brian Auger – keyboard, Hammond organ
- Bunny Brunel – keyboard, bass, engineering, production
- Dennis Chambers – drums
- Joe Ayoub – engineering
- Bernard Torelli – engineering, mixing
- Emmy Moreau – engineering
- Christopher S. Latham - engineering

== Awards ==
Title	Event	Award	Result
CAB 2	2002 Grammys	Best Contemporary Jazz Album	Nominated
