= Battle of Leningrad (album) =

Studio album by Ring of Fire
- Released: 20 January 2014
- Genres: Progressive metal Neoclassical metal
- Length: 52:20
- Label: Frontiers Music

Ring of Fire chronology
Lapse of Reality (2004)	Battle of Leningrad (2014)	Gravity (2022)

Battle of Leningrad is the fourth album by the American progressive metal band Ring of Fire.

The album was released on Frontiers Music in January 2014. Following a lengthy hiatus, Ring of Fire had reconvened in 2012. They made Battle of Leningrad as a concept album about the siege of Leningrad during World War II. From the previous albums, singer Mark Boals and guitarist Tony MacAlpine remained, adding keyboardist Vitalij Kuprij and two Finnish musicians, Timo Tolkki on bass and Jami Huovinen on drums. It was produced by Tolkki.

== Reception ==
Metal.de scored the album 7 out of 10. It was a "must-buy" for fans of neoclassical metal, and "the playing skills of the individual artists are, unsurprisingly, pretty much beyond reproach"; however, the album was up and down in quality. There was inconsistency, particularly because select songs could feel incoherent and "more like a string of different song sections than a cohesive piece". The reviewer also frowned upon the song "Firewind" almost veering "into AOR territory". The same score was given by Rock Hard. Heavymetal.dk lowered the score slightly to 6. "In spite of the large variation between the tracks, it somewhat loses its flair as time passes by, as it nonetheless becomes too similar-sounding". At times it was "cheesy and over the top".

Norway's Scream Magazine rated the album as mediocre, giving a dice throw of 3 (out of 6). The production and mix was not good, especially Kuprij's keyboard which were barely audible, and the arrangements were not satisfactory either, with "MacAlpine's leads stumbling into the songs almost at random". The "entire production reeks of the copy-paste principle". With the album being "a disappointment", the reviewer felt the musicians should concentrate on other projects "if they don't put more soul into the cooperation next time". Similar reviews include 3/6 from Eternal Terror and 5/10 from Metal Express Radio.

In American media, both Times Leader and KNAC radio gave 4 out of 5. Battle of Leningrad was "a neoclassical metalhead’s dream come true", wrote the latter, and the reviewer was stunned on several occasions, both because of the songwriting and performance by the lead performers. Similarly, DPRP gave 8 of 10 score. A distinction was that this review also gave credit to the cover designer, Felipe Machado Franco.

The Norwegian edition of Metal Hammer gave an even stronger review, 9 out of 10, for being "flawlessly executed", "pure art and a demonstration of power". Though the style was far from new, the album only contained strong songs. "Technical finesse, delicate arrangements and exquisite transitions permeate every single song", wrote the reviewer. Another very high score was 5/5 from Dangerdog Music Reviews.

== Track listing ==
No.	Title	Length
1.	"Mother Russia"	5:11
2.	"They're Calling Your Name"	4:05
3.	"Empire"	5:36
4.	"Land of Frozen Tears"	4:43
5.	"Firewind"	7:41
6.	"Where Angels Play"	4:56
7.	"Battle of Leningrad"	6:14
8.	"No Way Out"	5:14
9.	"Our World"	4:14
10.	"Rain"	4:26

== Personnel ==
- Mark Boals: vocals, bass
- Tony MacAlpine: guitar
- Timo Tolkki: bass
- Jami Huovinen: drums
- Vitalij Kuprij: keyboards
