= CAB 4 =

Studio album by CAB
- Released: September 23, 2003
- Recorded: Gigi Studios in Laguna Hills, California; T-Mac Studios in Pasadena, California; 623 Sound Studios in Venice; Track Star Studios in San Diego
- Genre: Instrumental rock, jazz fusion
- Length: 66:52
- Label: Favored Nations
- Producer: Bunny Brunel, Tony MacAlpine

CAB chronology
CAB 2 (2001)	CAB 4 (2003)	Theatre de Marionnettes (2009)

CAB 4 is the third studio album by the instrumental rock/jazz fusion band CAB, released on September 23, 2003 through Favored Nations.

== Critical reception ==
Professional ratings
Review scores
Source	Rating
All About Jazz	Favorable

Todd S. Jenkins at All About Jazz gave CAB 4 a positive review, calling it an improvement over the first two albums and "arguably the best effort yet from a group that bears further watching." All musicians were praised for their contributions and technical mastery, with Jenkins calling the band "a remarkable unit, their interplay marked by dime-turning tightness, their solos brilliantly exposed and crafted."

== Track listing ==
No.	Title	Writer(s)	Length
1.	"Hold On"	Bunny Brunel	4:35
2.	"One for the Road"	Tony MacAlpine	7:01
3.	"Shizuka"	MacAlpine	5:24
4.	"Tony Mac"	Brunel	8:33
5.	"Raymond"	Brunel	6:31
6.	"BB's Rhumba"	Brunel	4:53
7.	"Bass Ackward"	Brunel	4:51
8.	"Cloud 10"	MacAlpine	6:17
9.	"Alphonse"	Brunel	6:25
10.	"Jam & Toast"	Brunel	6:09
11.	"Dede"	Brunel	6:13
Total length:			66:52

== Personnel ==
- Tony MacAlpine – guitar, keyboard, production
- Patrice Rushen – clavinet, Rhodes piano, piano
- Brian Auger – keyboard, Hammond organ
- Bunny Brunel – keyboard, percussion programming, bass, engineering, mixing, production
- Dennis Chambers – drums
- Bernard Torelli – percussion programming, engineering, mixing, mastering
- Karma Auger – engineering
- Lance Jacobson – engineering
