= Ring of Fire (Mark Boals album) =

Studio album by Mark Boals
- Released: 22 November 2000
- Genre: Heavy metal
- Length: 50:22
- Label: Frontiers Records; FR CD 079
- Producer: Mark Boals

Mark Boals chronology
Ignition (1998)	Ring of Fire (2000)	Edge of the World (2002)

Professional ratings
Review scores
Source	Rating
Allmusic	link

Ring of Fire is the second studio album released by Mark Boals. After the album, Mark and others who worked on the album formed the band Ring of Fire, in its name.

== Track listing ==
All songs written by Mark Boals/Tony MacAlpine except where noted.

1. "Ring of Fire" – 4:01
2. "Atlantis" – 7:33 (Boals/Vitalij Kuprij)
3. "Bringer of Pain" – 4:04
4. "Betrayer" – 3:38 (Boals)
5. "Keeper of the Flame" – 4:59 (Boals)
6. "The Hunted" – 3:19 (Boals)
7. "The Quest" – 4:11 (Boals)
8. "Dreamer" – 6:11
9. "Death Row" – 3:42
10. "Alone" – 5:17
11. "Battle of the Titan" – 3:27
12. "Nessun Dorma" (bonus track for Japan) - 3:25 (Giacomo Puccini)

== Personnel ==
- Mark Boals – vocals, guitars and bass guitar
- Tony MacAlpine – guitars and bass guitar
- Vitalij Kuprij – keyboards
- Virgil Donati – drums

== Production ==
- Engineer – Barry Conley
- Mixing – Barry Conley
- Cover art – Eric Philippe
