= The Best of Axel Rudi Pell: Anniversary Edition =

Best Of Axel Rudi Pell: Anniversary Edition

Compilation album by Axel Rudi Pell
- Released: 2009
- Genre: Heavy metal
- Length: 78:00
- Label: Steamhammer/SPV

The Best Of Axel Rudi Pell: Anniversary Edition is the fifth compilation from German guitar player Axel Rudi Pell. It was released in 2009 on Steamhammer Records. The album showcases 12 tracks from the past ten years since 1999 of the current line up, with the exceptions of "Carousel" and "Oceans of Time" which feature previous drummer Jörg Michael.

== Track listing ==
All tracks written by Axel Rudi Pell except where indicated.

1. "Edge of the World"
2. "Carousel"
3. "Strong as a Rock"
4. "Beautiful Day" (Paul Hewson, Dave Evans, Larry Mullen Jr., Adam Clayton)
5. "Mystica"
6. "Forever Angel (Acoustic)"
7. "The Masquerade Ball"
8. "Rock the Nation"
9. "Oceans of Time"
10. "Tear Down the Walls"
11. "Ain't Gonna Win"
12. "In the Air Tonight" (Phil Collins)

== Personnel ==
- Vocals - Johnny Gioeli
- Guitars - Axel Rudi Pell
- Bass - Volker Krawczak
- Drums - Mike Terrana and Jörg Michael (tracks 2 and 9)
- Keyboards - Ferdy Doernberg
