= Axel Rudi Pell =

German guitarist (born 1960)

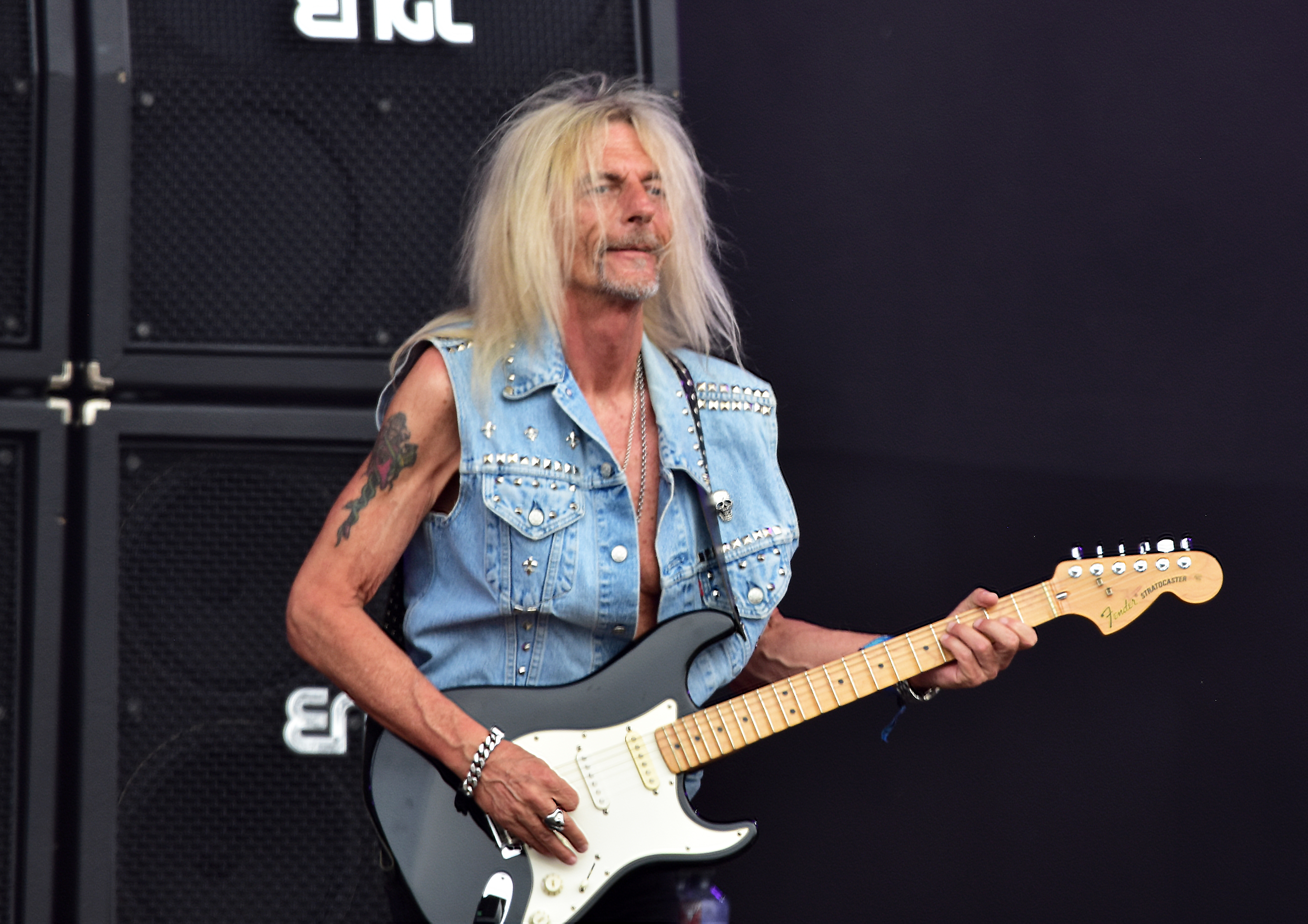
- Pell in 2024

Background information
- Born: 27 June 1960 (age 66); Bochum, West Germany
- Genres: Hard rock; heavy metal; power metal; neoclassical metal; speed metal (early)
- Instrument: Guitar
- Years active: 1981–present
- Label: SPV
- Member of: Axel Rudi Pell
- Formerly of: Steeler
- Website: axel-rudi-pell.de
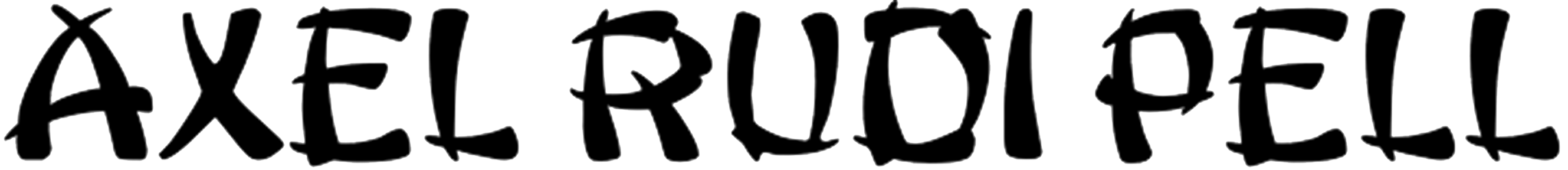

Axel Rudi Pell (born 27 June 1960) is a German hard rock guitarist. Formerly of the speed metal band Steeler, he has pursued a solo career since the late 1980s–early 1990s with the eponymous band Axel Rudi Pell, working with a number of vocalists; the longest-serving, since 1998, being Johnny Gioeli of Hardline.

== Career ==
Pell began his musical career with Steeler (1984–88) before leaving in 1988 to pursue a solo career. During this time, he has worked with drummers such as Jörg Michael and Mike Terrana, and singers including Charlie Huhn, Johnny Gioeli of Hardline, Jeff Scott Soto, and Rob Rock. Gioeli remains the longest-serving vocalist of the band, having joined in 1998 for the album Oceans of Time, his first musical appearance since the 1992 Hardline album Double Eclipse.

Pell often states that his music revolves around a knight in shining armor embarking on various adventures. Each album continues a new quest, with songs told as separate stories. His primary guitar influence has been Ritchie Blackmore of Deep Purple.

SPV Records released a live DVD on 25 February 2008, titled Live over Europe, which features the full performance from the Rock Hard Festival in 2007 and includes a bonus disc with live footage from Pell's personal archive. In 2012, the live concert CD/DVD Live on Fire was released.

In 2013, former Rainbow drummer Bobby Rondinelli joined the band, replacing Mike Terrana after his departure that year. Terrana chose to pursue other projects, including joining the supergroup The Ferrymen, featuring Rainbow singer Ronnie Romero. Pell celebrated his 25th anniversary as a solo artist in 2014, headlining the Bang Your Head festival in Balingen, Germany, on 11 July 2014. The event featured the band's second and third singers, Rob Rock and Jeff Scott Soto, along with special guests Joerg Michael, Ronnie Atkins, John Lawton, drummer Vinny Appice, and former Rainbow members Graham Bonnett, Doogie White and keyboardist Tony Carey. The show consisted of three acts: a short Steeler reunion and brief Axel Rudi Pell set with singers Rob Rock and Jeff Scott Soto, a full modern Axel Rudi Pell performance with vocalist Johnny Gioeli and current band members, and a final act featuring various Deep Purple and Rainbow covers with a full ensemble.

In 2019, the band celebrated its 30th anniversary with the release of a double live album, XXX – 30th Anniversary Live. The songs were recorded at various dates during the Knights Call 2018 tour. According to the group's Facebook page, the band was unaware they were being recorded, but after hearing the audio, they were impressed and decided to release it to commemorate the anniversary. It was released in June 2019 on CD and LP. Their most recent compilation, The Ballads 6, was released in early 2023.

On 5 February 2020, the band announced on Facebook that their next album, Sign of the Times, would be released on 24 April 2020. In March 2020, due to the ongoing COVID-19 pandemic, the release date was delayed to 8 May 2020. A supporting tour was postponed to 2021 and later delayed again until 2022. In late 2020, Pell announced another covers album, Diamonds Unlocked II, released on 30 July 2021, similar in style to 2007's Diamonds Unlocked. Pell is known for extensive touring, primarily in Germany and his hometown of Bochum. While he rarely tours internationally, he has performed occasional one-off shows in London in recent years. There has been strong demand for appearances in other countries. The band is also a regular presence at music festivals, particularly Wacken Open Air, where they have performed since the late 1990s.

Lost XXIII was released on 15 April 2022. The group appeared at the Sweden Rock Festival in 2024. In the same year, they released their latest album, Risen Symbol. The band will release their twenty-third album, Ghost Town, on 20 March 2026.

== Band members ==
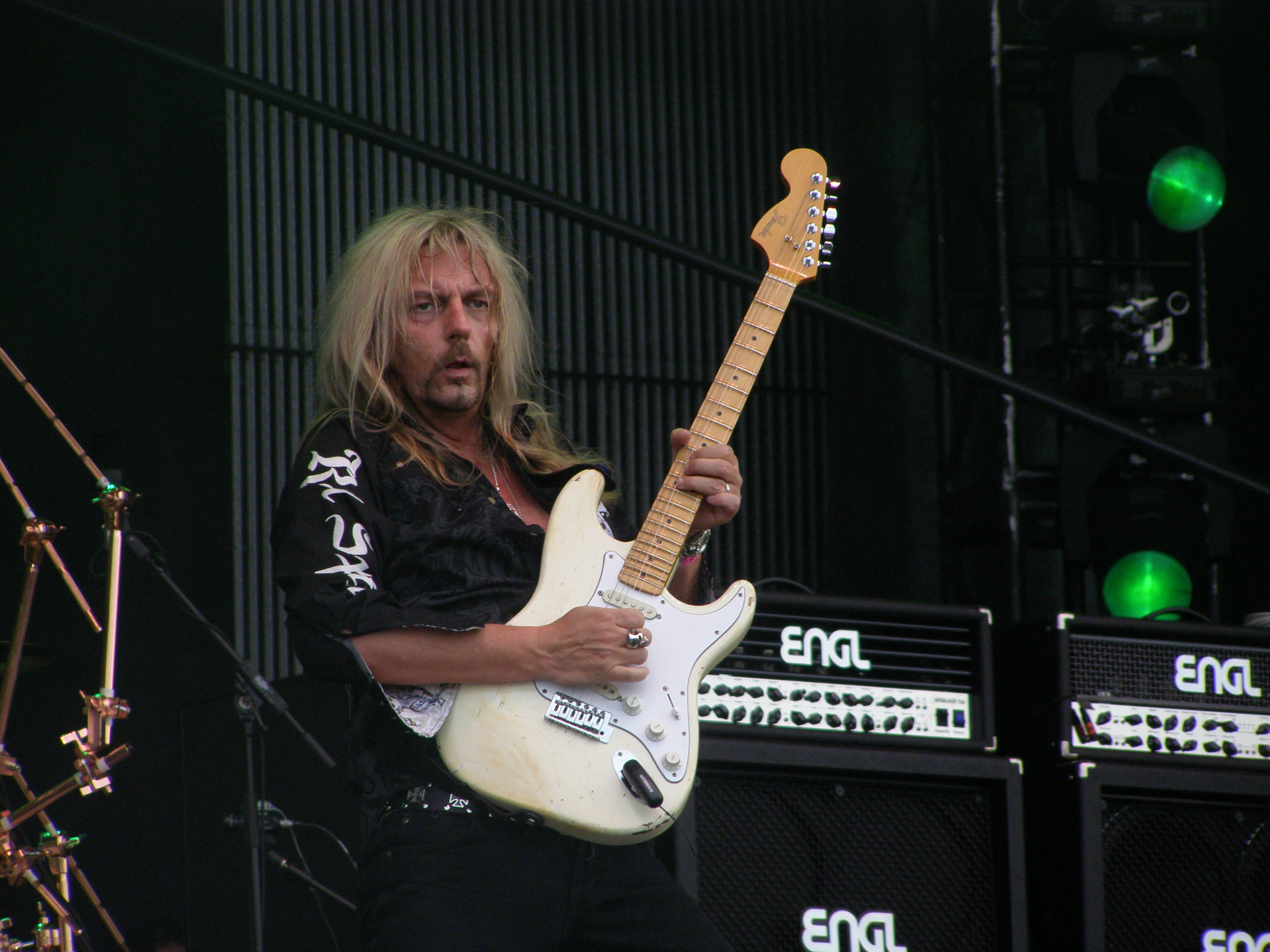
Pell at Wacken Open Air 2009

=== Current ===
- Axel Rudi Pell — guitar (1989–present)
- Johnny Gioeli — lead vocals (1998–present)
- Ferdy Doernberg — keyboards (1997–present)
- Volker Krawczak — bass guitar (1989–present)
- Bobby Rondinelli — drums (2013–present)

=== Past ===
==== Vocals ====
- Charlie Huhn (1989)
- Rob Rock (1991)
- Jeff Scott Soto (1992–97)

==== Bass ====
- Jörg Deisinger (1989)
- Thomas Smuszynski (1989)

==== Drums ====
- Jörg Michael (1989–98)
- Mike Terrana (1998–2013)

==== Keyboards ====
- Georg Hahn (1989)
- Rüdiger König (1989)
- Kai Raglewski (1991–92)
- Julie Greaux (1993–96)
- Christian Wolff (1997)

== Discography ==
=== With Steeler ===
- Steeler (1984)
- Rulin' the Earth (1985)
- Strike Back (1986)
- Undercover Animal (1988)

=== Solo ===
==== Albums ====
- Wild Obsession (1989)
- Nasty Reputation (1991)
- Eternal Prisoner (1992)
- Between the Walls (1994)
- Black Moon Pyramid (1996)
- Magic (1997)
- Oceans of Time (1998)
- The Masquerade Ball (2000)
- Shadow Zone (2002)
- Kings and Queens (2004)
- Mystica (2006)
- Diamonds Unlocked (2007) (cover album)
- Tales of the Crown (2008)
- The Crest (2010)
- Circle of the Oath (2012)
- Into the Storm (2014)
- Game of Sins (2016)
- Knights Call (2018)
- Sign of the Times (2020)
- Diamonds Unlocked II (2021) (cover album)
- Lost XXIII (2022)
- Risen Symbol (2024)
- Ghost Town (2026)

==== Compilations ====
- The Ballads (1993)
- The Ballads II (1999)
- The Wizard's Chosen Few (2000)
- The Ballads III (2004)
- The Best of Axel Rudi Pell: Anniversary Edition (2009)
- The Ballads IV (2011)
- The Ballads V (2017)
- The Ballads VI (2023)

==== Live ====
- Made in Germany (1995)
- Knights Live (2002)
- Live on Fire (2013)
- Magic Moments: 25th Anniversary Special Show (2015)
- XXX Anniversary Live (2019)

==== DVDs ====
- Knight Treasures (Live and More) (2002)
- Live Over Europe (2008)
- One Night Live (2010)
- Live on Fire (2013)
- Magic Moments 25th Anniversary Special Show (2015)

=== Guest appearances ===
- Onkel Tom Angelripper – Ein schöner Tag... (1996) – guest guitar
- Roland Grapow – The Four Seasons of Life (1997) – guitar solo on "The Winner"
- Rob Rock – Eyes of Eternity (2003) – guitar solo on "The Hour of Dawn"
- Doro – 25 Years in Rock... and Still Going Strong (2010) – guest guitar on "East Meets West" (Warlock cover)
- Enrichment – EP 2012 (2012) – guest guitar on "Reanimate Your Roots (featured version)"
- Wolfpakk – Rise of the Animal (2015) – guest guitar on "Rise of the Animal"
- The Carsten Lizard Schulz Syndicate – The Day the Earth Stopped Turning (2015) – guest guitar
- FB1964 – Störtebeker (2017) – guest guitar on "Victual Brothers"
- Secret Discovery – Truth, Faith, Love (2023) – guest guitar on "In My Life"
