= Violent Machine =

Studio album by Tony MacAlpine
- Released: 1996
- Recorded: July 1996
- Studio: Shime Sound Studio (Los Angeles)
- Genre: Instrumental rock
- Length: 40:35
- Label: Metropolis
- Producer: Tony MacAlpine

Tony MacAlpine chronology
Evolution (1995)	Violent Machine (1996)	Live Insanity (1997)

Alternative cover
- 2002 reissue

Professional ratings
Review scores
Source	Rating
AllMusic	3.5/5 stars

Violent Machine is the seventh studio album by guitarist Tony MacAlpine, released in 1996 through Metropolis Records (North America) and in 1997 through Victor Entertainment (Japan); it was reissued on May 7, 2002 through Lion Music, with the latter featuring different cover art and having apparently been released without the authorization of MacAlpine or Metropolis.

== Track listing ==
All music is composed by Tony MacAlpine, except where noted.

No.	Title	Length
1.	"Violent Machine"	3:42
2.	"Unfortunate Lazarus"	3:58
3.	"Circus du Soleil"	4:41
4.	"Sophisticated Domination"	5:02
5.	"Chopin Etude #12 Opus 10" (Frédéric Chopin)	2:42
6.	"Shoe Shine Cyber Boy"	3:27
7.	"Carolina Blue"	4:32
8.	"Mr. Destructive"	5:19
9.	"ARS Nova"	3:08
10.	"Space Ritual"	4:04
Total length:		40:35

Japanese edition
No.	Title	Length
1.	"Violent Machine"	3:42
2.	"Unfortunate Lazarus"	3:58
3.	"Hatred to Love" (same song as "Space Ritual" but with vocals)	4:04
4.	"Circus du Soleil"	4:41
5.	"Sophisticated Domination"	5:02
6.	"Chopin Etude #12 Opus 10" (Frédéric Chopin)	2:42
7.	"Shoe Shine Cyber Boy"	3:27
8.	"Carolina Blue"	4:32
9.	"Little Gem"	5:12
10.	"ARS Nova"	3:08
11.	"Out of Touch"	4:43

== Personnel ==
- Tony MacAlpine – guitar, keyboard, mixing, production
- Jerome Jones – vocals ("Hatred to Love")
- Mike Terrana – drums
- Kevin Chown – bass
- Damir Šimić-Shime – engineering, mixing
- Bob Fisher – mastering

Note: Although the back of the CD tray inlay for the 1996 Metropolis edition shows/lists Ricky Ricardo on bass, the liner notes in the cover booklet state: "All Bass Tracks Performed by Kevin Chown." The 2002 Lion edition correctly lists and shows Kevin Chown on bass, as does the back of the CD tray inlay.
