= Mike Terrana =

American drummer (born 1960)

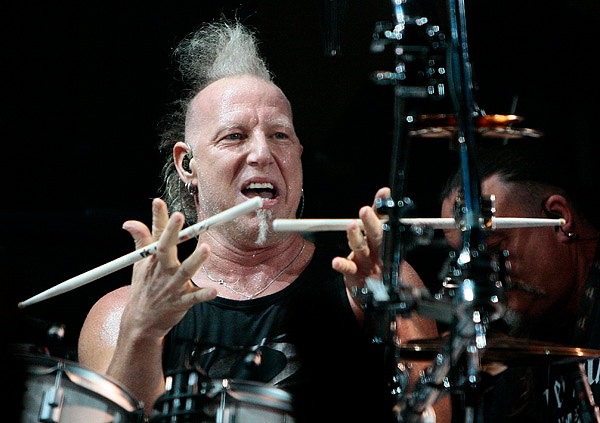
- Terrana performing in 2012

Background information
- Born: January 21, 1960 (age 66); Buffalo, New York, U.S.
- Genres: Instrumental rock; power metal; neoclassical metal; heavy metal; progressive metal; jazz fusion
- Occupation: Drummer
- Years active: 1978–present
- Member of: TERRANA; Beauty of the Beat; Kreyson
- Formerly of: Hanover Fist; Vision Divine; Avalanch
- Website: terrana.com

Mike Terrana (born January 21, 1960) is an American hard rock and heavy metal drummer.

== Career ==
His first professional work was in 1984, with the MCA band Hanover Fist from Toronto, Canada. Between 1987 and 1997, he was based in Los Angeles and collaborated with various guitarists, including Yngwie Malmsteen, Tony Macalpine, and Steve Lukather, as well as bands like Kuni and Beau Nasty.

In 1997, Terrana relocated to Europe—first to the Netherlands for six months and then to Germany. He worked with German bands and artists such as Rage, Gamma Ray, Savage Circus, Axel Rudi Pell, Roland Grapow, and Masterplan.

In 2016, Terrana joined the Italian heavy metal band Vision Divine. In 2017, he became a member of the metal bands Avalanch (Spain) and Kreyson (Czechia).

Since 2020, he has been sharing drumming videos on TikTok. As of January 2025, he has over 648,000 followers.

== Discography ==
Solo

- Shadows of the Past (1998)
- Man of the World (2005)
- Sinfonica (2011)

Artension

- Into the Eye of the Storm (1996)
- Phoenix Rising (1997)
- Sacred Pathways (2001)
- New Discovery (2002)
- Future World (2004)

Axel Rudi Pell

- The Ballads II (1999)
- The Wizard's Chosen Few (2000)
- The Masquerade Ball (2000)
- Shadow Zone (2002)
- Knights Live (2002)
- Kings and Queens (2004)
- The Ballads III (2004)
- Mystica (2006)
- Diamonds Unlocked (2007)
- Tales of the Crown (2008)
- The Best of Axel Rudi Pell: Anniversary Edition (2009)
- The Crest (2010)
- The Ballads IV (2011)
- Circle of the Oath (2012)

Avalanch

- El Ángel Caído 2017 (2017)
- Hacia La Luz – Directo desde Madrid (2018)
- El secreto (2019)
- The Secret (2019)

Beau Nasty

- Dirty But Well Dressed (1989)

Ferdy Doernberg

- Storytellers Rain (2001)
- Till I Run Out of Road (2004)

Downhell

- A Relative Coexistence (2008)

Driven

- Self-Inflicted (2001)

Emir Hot

- Sevdah Metal (2008)

Empire

- Chasing Shadows (2007)

Jean Fontanille

- Unknown Parameter Value (2008)

Roland Grapow

- Kaleidoscope (1999)

Haggard

- Tales of Ithiria (2008) (as narrator)

Hanover Fist

- Hungry Eyes (1985)

Tony Hernando

- The Shades of Truth (2002)
- Ill (2005)
- TH III – Live! (CD/DVD, 2006)
- Actual Events (2009)

Kuni

- Looking for Action (1988)

Kiko Loureiro

- No Gravity (2005)
- Fullblast (2009)

Marco Iacobini

- The Sky There'll Always Be (2013)

Tony MacAlpine

- Freedom to Fly (1992)
- Evolution (1995)
- Violent Machine (1996)
- Live Insanity (1997)

Yngwie Malmsteen

- The Seventh Sign (1993)
- I Can't Wait (1994)
- Best Of (2000)
- Archive Box (2001)

Masterplan

- MK II (2007)
- Time to Be King (2010)

Metalium

- Millennium Metal – Chapter One (1999)

Razorback

- Deadringer (2007)

Rage

- Welcome to the Other Side (2001)
- Best of – All G.U.N. Years (2001)
- Unity (2002)
- Soundchaser (2003)
- From the Cradle to the Stage (2004)
- Speak of the Dead (2006)
- Full Moon in St. Petersburg (2007)

Vision Divine

- When All the Heroes Are Dead (2019)

Savage Circus

- Of Doom and Death (2009)

Damir Šimić-Shime

- The Quest (1998)
- Live in Zagreb (2002)
- Demomstratus (2004)

Stuart Smith

- Heaven & Earth (1998)

Squealer

- Made for Eternity (2000)
- Under the Cross (2002)

Taboo Voodoo

- Somethin's Cookin' (2003)

Tarja Turunen

- What Lies Beneath (2010)
- Act I: Live in Rosario (2012)
- Colours in the Dark (2013)
- Beauty and the Beat (2014)
- Luna Park Ride (2015)
- The Shadow Self (2016)

The Dogma

- Black Roses (2006)

Tracy G

- Deviating from the Set List (2003)

John West

- Mind Journey (1997)

Zillion

- Zillion (2004)

Theodore Ziras

- Superhuman (2008)

Kee Marcello

- Judas Kiss (2013)

The Ferrymen

- The Ferrymen (2017)
- A New Evil (2019)
- One More River to Cross (2022)

Other releases

- Tribute to Accept (Metalium track "Burning") (1999)
- Holy Dio – A Tribute to the Voice of Metal: Ronnie James Dio (1999)

== Videography ==
Axel Rudi Pell

- Knight Treasures (Live and More) (2002)
- Live Over Europe (DVD, 2008)
- One Night Live (DVD, 2010)
- Live on Fire (DVD, 2012)

Rage

- From the Cradle to the Stage Live (DVD, 2004)
- Full Moon in St. Petersburg Live (DVD, 2007)

Tony Hernando

- Tony Hernando THIII Live (DVD, 2006)

Tony MacAlpine

- Starlicks Master Session (VHS, 1992)
- Live in L.A. (DVD, 1997)

Yngwie Malmsteen

- Live at Budokan (DVD, 1994)

Tarja Turunen

- Act I: Live in Rosario (2012)
- Beauty and the Beat (2014)

Terrana solo DVDs

- Rhythm Beast Performance (2007)
- Double Bass Mechanics (1996)
- Beginning Rock Drums (1995)
