= CAB (album) =

Studio album by CAB
- Released: March 7, 2000
- Recorded: B&W Studios in Woodland Hills, Los Angeles, California; MI Studios in Hollywood, Los Angeles, California
- Genre: Instrumental rock, jazz fusion
- Length: 52:02
- Label: Tone Center
- Producer: Bunny Brunel

CAB chronology
CAB (2000)	CAB 2 (2001)

Professional ratings
Review scores
Source	Rating
AllMusic	3/5 stars

CAB is the self-titled first studio album by the band CAB, released on March 7, 2000, through Tone Center Records.

== Track listing ==
No.	Title	Writer(s)	Length
1.	"Night Splash"	Bunny Brunel	5:20
2.	"CAB"	Brunel	7:16
3.	"So There Is Love"	Tony MacAlpine	3:41
4.	"Just Perfect"	Brunel	5:05
5.	"One for Stern"	Brunel	6:59
6.	"The Watcher"	MacAlpine	3:47
7.	"Atamanashi"	Brunel, Kazumi Watanabe	5:23
8.	"Boogie Me"	Brunel	4:39
9.	"Elastic Man"	MacAlpine	5:15
10.	"Bernard"	Brunel	4:37
Total length:			52:02

== Personnel ==
- Tony MacAlpine – guitar, keyboard
- Bunny Brunel – keyboard, bass, engineering, mixing, production
- Dennis Chambers – drums
- Brian Auger – organ
- Barry Rudolph – engineering, mixing
- Dallan Beck – engineering
