= Master of Paradise =

Studio album by Tony MacAlpine
- Released: November 2, 1999
- Recorded: Early 1999
- Studio: Clear Lake Audio (North Hollywood, Los Angeles); Allen Street Studios (New York City)
- Genre: Heavy metal, instrumental rock
- Length: 49:37
- Label: Shrapnel
- Producer: Tony MacAlpine

Tony MacAlpine chronology
| Live Insanity (1997) | Master of Paradise (1999) | Chromaticity (2001) |

Master of Paradise is the eighth studio album by guitarist Tony MacAlpine, released on November 2, 1999 through Shrapnel Records. This album marks the first (and so far only) time MacAlpine himself sang on any of his releases; only two of the tracks are instrumental.

Early pressings suffered from a mastering error which resulted in the overall volume being very low. This was corrected on later pressings, but yet another manufacturing error arose afterwards which remained uncorrected, this time involving the track listing: the order was printed incorrectly on the back cover, along with an image of MacAlpine mistakenly reversed to show him playing a left-handed guitar. The correct track listing is shown below.

== Critical reception ==
Professional ratings
Review scores
| Source | Rating |
|---|---|
| AllMusic | 3/5 stars |

Steve Huey at AllMusic gave Master of Paradise three stars out of five, saying that it was not a stylistic departure from MacAlpine's previous albums while highlighting MacAlpine's singing: "The results aren't always incredible, but MacAlpine generally gets the job done, solidly if unspectacularly." He also likened his neoclassical guitar work to that of Yngwie Malmsteen and recommended the album for fans of shred guitar.

== Track listing ==
All tracks are written by Tony MacAlpine, except where noted.

| No. | Title | Length |
|---|---|---|
| 1. | "Maker Is King" | 3:49 |
| 2. | "Tears of Darkness" | 5:24 |
| 3. | "Live to Die" | 6:50 |
| 4. | "Circus" | 4:14 |
| 5. | "Still" | 5:05 |
| 6. | "Master of Paradise" | 6:14 |
| 7. | "Time" | 5:18 |
| 8. | "Imagination" | 4:55 |
| 9. | "Final Hour" | 4:32 |
| 10. | "Au bord d'une source" (Franz Liszt) | 3:16 |
| Total length: | | 49:37 |

Misprinted edition / Japanese (Victor Entertainment) and Korean (Seoul Records) editions
| No. | Title | Length |
|---|---|---|
| 1. | "Tears of Darkness" |
| 2. | "Live to Die" |
| 3. | "Circus" |
| 4. | "Still" |
| 5. | "Time" |
| 6. | "Master of Paradise" |
| 7. | "Imagination" |
| 8. | "Maker Is King" |
| 9. | "Final Hour" |
| 10. | "Au bord d'une source" |

== Personnel ==
- Tony MacAlpine – vocals, guitar, keyboard, engineering, production
- Atma Anur – drums
- Larry Dennison – bass
- Brian Levi – engineering, mixing
- Albert Law – editing, mastering
