= Freedom to Fly =

Studio album by Tony MacAlpine
- Released: 1992
- Recorded: Clear Lake Audio (Burbank, California)
- Genre: Instrumental rock
- Length: 43:07
- Label: Shrapnel
- Producer: Robert Margouleff

Tony MacAlpine chronology
Eyes of the World (1990)	Freedom to Fly (1992)	Madness (1993)

Professional ratings
Review scores
Source	Rating
AllMusic	(No review)

Freedom to Fly is the third studio album by guitarist Tony MacAlpine, released in 1992 through Shrapnel Records (United States) and Roadrunner Records (Europe).

== Track listing ==
All music is composed by Tony MacAlpine, except where noted.

No.	Title	Length
1.	"Ice Princess"	4:48
2.	"Box Office Poison"	4:51
3.	"Salvation"	5:25
4.	"Freedom to Fly"	3:47
5.	"Champion"	5:12
6.	"Stream Dream"	4:23
7.	"Albania"	4:37
8.	"Chopin Etude #2 Opus #25" (Frédéric Chopin)	1:33
9.	"Disciples of Fear"	4:11
10.	"Capistrano"	4:20
Total length:		43:07

== Personnel ==
- Tony MacAlpine – guitar, keyboard, piano
- Mike Terrana – drums
- Larry Dennison – bass
- Robert Margouleff – mixing, production
- Brant Biles – engineering, mixing
- Colin Mitchell – mixing assistance
- Rusty Richards – mixing assistance
- Bernie Grundman – mastering
