= Deuce (Beautiful Creatures album) =

Studio album by Beautiful Creatures
- Released: August 23, 2005
- Recorded: 2002–2005
- Genre: Hard rock
- Label: Spitfire

Beautiful Creatures chronology
Beautiful Creatures (2001)	Deuce (2005)

Professional ratings
Review scores
Source	Rating
AllMusic	4/5 stars

Deuce is the second studio album by American rock band Beautiful Creatures. It was released in 2005 under the Spitfire label.

== Track listing ==
All tracks by Beautiful Creatures.

1. "Anyone" – 2:40
2. "Freedom" – 2:56
3. "Unforgiven" – 3:53
4. "Save Me" – 3:28
5. "Superfly" – 2:47
6. "Empty" – 3:37
7. "Never" – 2:29
8. "Straight to Hell" – 2:48
9. "The Unknown" – 0:42
10. "Ton of Lead" – 5:30
11. "Brand New Day" – 3:10
12. "Thanks" – 3:32
13. "I Won't Be the One" – 0:17
14. "Starr Cross" (Japanese bonus track) – 5:32
15. "I Still Miss You" (Japanese bonus track) – 4:31

== Personnel ==
Band

- Joe Lesté – vocals
- Alex Grossi – lead guitar
- Anthony Focx – guitar, vocals (background), producer, engineer, mixing
- Kenny Kweens – bass
- Matt Starr – drums

Additional musicians

- Michael Thomas – guitar
- Glen Sobel – drums
- Roxy Saint – additional vocals on "Never"

Additional personnel

- James Book – producer, engineer
- Mark Chalecki – mastering
- Kenny Kweens & Sean Reed – art direction, design
