= Chromaticity (album) =

Studio album by Tony MacAlpine
- Released: August 7, 2001
- Recorded: 2001
- Studio: Neverland Studio (Novato, California); Barry Sparks' home studio (Arizona)
- Genre: Instrumental rock, progressive metal, jazz fusion
- Length: 50:45
- Label: Shrapnel
- Producer: Tony MacAlpine, Steve Smith

Tony MacAlpine chronology
Master of Paradise (1999)	Chromaticity (2001)	Collection: The Shrapnel Years (2006)

Chromaticity is the ninth studio album by guitarist Tony MacAlpine, released on August 7, 2001 through Shrapnel Records.

== Critical reception ==
Professional ratings
Review scores
Source	Rating
AllMusic	3/5 stars

Glenn Astarita at AllMusic gave Chromaticity three stars out of five, saying that "Simply put, MacAlpine possesses enormous chops!" He also praised the contributions of drummer Steve Smith and bassist Barry Sparks.

== Track listing ==
All music is composed by Tony MacAlpine, except where noted.

No.	Title	Length
1.	"Christmas Island"	5:43
2.	"Chromaticity"	5:35
3.	"City Beneath the Sea"	6:14
4.	"Digitalis Destructi"	4:39
5.	"Isis"	5:21
6.	"Prince of Light"	4:36
7.	"Still Valley"	5:05
8.	"Avenger"	5:08
9.	"Eye of the Soul"	6:08
10.	"Etude Nr. 8 Op. 10" (Frédéric Chopin)	2:16
Total length:		50:45

== Personnel ==
- Tony MacAlpine – guitar, keyboard, piano, production
- Steve Smith – drums, production
- Barry Sparks – bass
- Robert M. Biles – engineering
- Bernie Torelli – mixing, mastering
