= Premonition (Tony MacAlpine album) =

Studio album by Tony MacAlpine
- Released: 1994
- Recorded: Prairie Sun Recording Studios (Cotati, California)
- Genre: Instrumental rock
- Length: 53:28
- Label: Shrapnel
- Producer: Tony MacAlpine, Mike Varney

Tony MacAlpine chronology
Madness (1993)	Premonition (1994)	Evolution (1995)

Premonition is the fifth studio album by guitarist Tony MacAlpine, released in 1994 through Shrapnel Records.

== Critical reception ==
Professional ratings
Review scores
Source	Rating
AllMusic	2.5/5 stars

Robert Taylor at AllMusic calls Premonition "very monotonous with less than memorable melodies and little variety in [MacAlpine's] guitar sound" and "A slightly better than average release in a tired genre." He nonetheless praised MacAlpine's fast guitar work and the "excellent" contributions of drummer Deen Castronovo, but remarked that "the predictable song structures limit the possibilities of the music."

== Track listing ==
All music is composed by Tony MacAlpine, except where noted.

No.	Title	Length
1.	"Opus 28 #18" (Frédéric Chopin)	0:49
2.	"The Violin Song"	6:00
3.	"Ghost of Versailles"	4:30
4.	"Tower of London"	4:15
5.	"Rusalka"	7:15
6.	"Rondeau Partita #2" (Johann Sebastian Bach)	1:22
7.	"Gila Monster"	3:37
8.	"The Czar"	5:22
9.	"Maestro di Cappella"	4:30
10.	"Inflection"	5:13
11.	"Opus 28 #3" (Chopin)	0:53
12.	"Animation"	5:05
13.	"Winter in Osaka"	4:37
Total length:		53:28

== Personnel ==
- Tony MacAlpine – guitar, keyboard (except tracks 2, 10), production
- Jens Johansson – keyboard (tracks 2, 10)
- Deen Castronovo – drums
- Tony Franklin – bass
- Steve Fontano – engineering
- Shawn Morris – engineering
- Joe Marquez – engineering
- Arjan MacNamara – engineering, mastering
- Mark "Mooka" Rennick – overdubbing, mixing, mastering
- Mike Varney – executive production
