= Edge of Insanity =

- Cover art by Guy Aitchison

Studio album by Tony MacAlpine
- Released: January 1986
- Recorded: 1985
- Studio: Prairie Sun Recording Studios (Cotati, California)
- Genre: Instrumental rock, neoclassical metal
- Length: 41:17
- Label: Shrapnel
- Producer: Mike Varney

Tony MacAlpine chronology
Edge of Insanity (1986)	Maximum Security (1987)

Alternative cover
- Japanese edition

Edge of Insanity is the first studio album by guitarist Tony MacAlpine, released in 1986 through Shrapnel Records. In 2014, nearly thirty years after its release, MacAlpine performed the album in full during a series of shows in California and Baja California.

== Critical reception ==
Professional ratings
Review scores
Source	Rating
AllMusic	2.5/5 stars
Collector's Guide to Heavy Metal	4/10
Kerrang!	3/5 stars

In a contemporary review, Paul Henderson of Kerrang! defined MacAlpine's technical abilities on guitar and piano as "quite phenomenal", but found his playing "totally cold" and with "a serious lack of rock 'n' roll attitude", while, in contrast, praised "the masterful, superbly sympathetic, yet also inspired" performance of bassist Billy Sheehan and drummer Steve Smith.

Andy Hinds of AllMusic described Edge of Insanity as following "the rough blueprint of Yngwie [Malmsteen]'s model" and praised MacAlpine's "impressive licks" and "exciting guitar/keyboard interplay". However, he remarked that "his second album, Maximum Security, is much better." Canadian journalist Martin Popoff gave the same judgement, but considered Edge of Insanity "nicely intimate, versatile and not embarassingly recorded."

In a 2009 article by Guitar World magazine, Edge of Insanity was ranked fourth on the all-time top ten list of shred albums. The staff wrote: "The album that launched Mike Varney's Shrapnel Records, Edge of Insanity shows off Tony MacAlpine's fearsome shred chops not only on the six-string ("Quarter to Midnight") but also on the ivories ("Chopin, Prelude 16, Opus 28")."

== Track listing ==
All music is composed by Tony MacAlpine, except where noted.

Side one
No.	Title	Length
1.	"Wheel of Fortune"	3:43
2.	"The Stranger"	3:59
3.	"Quarter to Midnight (Live Solo)"	2:24
4.	"Agrionia"	4:31
5.	"Empire in the Sky ^{†}"	5:54

Side Two
No.	Title	Length
6.	"The Witch and the Priest"	3:33
7.	"The Taker"	3:22
8.	"Chopin, Prelude 16, Opus 28" (Frédéric Chopin)	1:20
9.	"Edge of Insanity"	4:18
10.	"The Raven"	4:13
11.	"No Place in Time"	4:00
Total length:		41:17

Japanese edition bonus track
No.	Title	Length
12.	"Birds of Prey (Billy's Boogie)"	3:45
Total length:		45:02

^† – On some reissues of the album, "Empire in the Sky" is split into two tracks.

== Personnel ==
Musicians

- Tony MacAlpine – guitars, keyboards, bass (track 7)
- Billy Sheehan – bass (except track 3, 7 and 8)
- Steve Smith – drums

Production

- Mike Varney – producer
- Steve Fontano – engineer
- George Horn – mastering at Fantasy Studios, Berkeley, California
- Mike Mani – keyboards programming
