= The Crest (album) =

Studio album by Axel Rudi Pell
- Released: 2010
- Genre: Heavy metal, hard rock, power metal
- Length: 55:05
- Label: Steamhammer/SPV

Axel Rudi Pell chronology
Tales of the Crown (2008)	The Crest (2010)	Circle of the Oath (2012)

The Crest is the fourteenth album by German speed/power metal guitarist Axel Rudi Pell, and was released in 2010 on Steamhammer/SPV records.

== Deluxe edition ==
On November 22, 2010, a deluxe edition of the Crest was released, which along with new artwork and additional photos and a 24-page booklet, also contains a second disc containing songs performed in the last Axel Rudi Pell DVD One Night Live, as well as an extended version of "Dreaming Dead" which has a longer guitar solo.

== Reception ==
Professional ratings
Review scores
Source	Rating
Allmusic	3.5/5 stars
About.com	3.5/5 stars
Fury Rocks	9.5/10 stars
Lords of Metal	(9.4/10)
Jukebox:Metal	4/5 stars

Charts: Austria #68; Sweden #45; Switzerland #38; Germany #22.

== Track listing ==
All songs by Axel Rudi Pell

1. "Prelude of Doom" (intro) - 1:32
2. "Too Late" - 5:58
3. "Devil Zone" - 6:08
4. "Prisoner of Love" - 5:56
5. "Dreaming Dead" - 7:39
6. "Glory Night" - 5:45
7. "Dark Waves of the Sea (Oceans of Time Part II: The Dark Side)" - 8:00
8. "Burning Rain" - 5:44
9. "Noblesse Oblige (Opus #5 Adagio Contabile)" - 4:08
10. "The End of Our Time" - 6:15
11. "Dreaming Dead (Extended Version)" - 11:06 (Only available in the Deluxe Edition)

Disc 2 of Deluxe Edition:

1. "Tear Down the Walls" - 6:27
2. "Strong as a Rock" - 8:14
3. "Medley: The Masquerade Ball / Casbah / Tales of the Crown" - 14:37
4. "Drum Solo" - 4:32
5. "Rock the Nation" - 6:10
6. "The Temple of the King" - 9:20
7. "Mystica" - 9:47
8. "Fool Fool / Eternal Prisoner" - 13:33

== Personnel ==
- Johnny Gioeli - Vocals
- Axel Rudi Pell - Guitar
- Volker Krawczak - Bass
- Mike Terrana - Drums
- Ferdy Doernberg - Keyboards
