= Mystica (Axel Rudi Pell album) =

Studio album by Axel Rudi Pell
- Released: August 25, 2006
- Recorded: February – May, 2006
- Genre: Heavy metal, hard rock, power metal
- Length: 58:07
- Label: Steamhammer/SPV
- Producer: Axel Rudi Pell, Charlie Bauerfeind

Axel Rudi Pell chronology
Kings and Queens (2004)	Mystica (2006)	Diamonds Unlocked (2007)

Mystica is the eleventh album by German melodic hard rock and power metal guitarist Axel Rudi Pell, released in 2006.

== Track listing ==
1. "The Mysterious Return" (Intro) - 1:18
2. "Fly to the Moon" - 5:33
3. "Rock the Nation" - 5:29
4. "Valley of Sin" - 7:10
5. "Living a Lie" - 5:27
6. "No Chance to Live" - 6:18
7. "Mystica" - 8:26
8. "Haunted Castle Serenade (Opus #4 Grazioso E Agresso)" - 3:52
9. "Losing the Game" - 4:35
10. "The Curse of the Damned" - 9:57

== Personnel ==
- Johnny Gioeli - vocals
- Axel Rudi Pell - guitar
- Volker Krawczak - bass guitar
- Mike Terrana - drums
- Ferdy Doernberg - keyboards
