= Seven the Hardway =

US progressive rock band

Seven the Hardway is a US progressive rock band formed in 2009 consisting of Tony MacAlpine, Virgil Donati, Mark Boals, Doug Shreeve and Stefanía Daniel.

Their self-titled debut album, released in August 2010 on Mascot/Provogue Records, was mixed by Roy Z and mastered by Maor Appelbaum. It features artwork by Dale O’Dell but does not feature band members Shreeve and Daniel as MacAlpine recorded all the guitars and bass.

In January 2011, Nili Brosh joined the band replacing Stefania Daniel.

== Discography ==
- Seven the Hardway (2010)
