= CAB (band) =

American jazz fusion band

- Origin: United States
- Genres: Jazz fusion; instrumental rock; funk
- Years active: 2000–present
- Labels: Tone Center; Favored Nations
- Members: Sam Aliano; Mitch Forman; Doug Webb; Bunny Brunel
- Past members: Tony MacAlpine; Brian Auger; Patrice Rushen; Dennis Chambers; David Hirschfelder; Virgil Donati
- Website: cabband.com

CAB is an American jazz fusion supergroup founded by Bunny Brunel, Dennis Chambers, and Tony MacAlpine. Since their formation in 2000, they have released four studio albums and two live albums. Their second album, CAB 2, received a nomination for Best Contemporary Jazz Album at the 2002 Grammy Awards. Other members who have been a part of CAB include Patrice Rushen, Virgil Donati, David Hirschfelder, and Brian Auger.

When asked about the band's name, Brunel said:

...Center Tone Records wanted me to record an album with Dennis Chambers and Tony MacAlpine. [I thought I’d create an acronym of our last names] Chambers, Alpine, and Brunel. I didn’t know that MacAlpine was an ‘M’ and not separate from the ‘A.’ But we thought it was a good way to carry the music... CAB, so we left it like that.

— Bunny Brunel, All About Jazz

== Discography ==
=== Studio albums ===
- 2000: CAB
- 2001: CAB 2
- 2003: CAB 4
- 2009: Theatre de Marionnettes

=== Live albums ===
- 2002: Live!
- 2011: Live on Sunset
