= Madness (Tony MacAlpine album) =

Studio album by Tony MacAlpine
- Released: 1993
- Studio: Clear Lake Audio (North Hollywood)
- Genre: Instrumental rock
- Length: 43:40
- Label: Shrapnel
- Producer: Tony MacAlpine, Glen Sobel, Larry Dennison, Brian Levi

Tony MacAlpine chronology
| Freedom to Fly (1992) | Madness (1993) | Premonition (1994) |

Professional ratings
Review scores
| Source | Rating |
|---|---|
| AllMusic | (no review) |

Madness is the fourth studio album by guitarist Tony MacAlpine, released in 1993 through Shrapnel Records.

== Track listing ==
All music is composed by Tony MacAlpine, except where noted.

| No. | Title | Length |
|---|---|---|
| 1. | "Naked Nancy" | 3:29 |
| 2. | "Peruvian Power Layback" | 4:46 |
| 3. | "Albert's Fat Sister" | 3:17 |
| 4. | "Restaurant at the End of the Universe" | 5:06 |
| 5. | "Realm of the Flying Monkeys" | 4:50 |
| 6. | "Prelude #8 Opus 28" (Frédéric Chopin) | 2:10 |
| 7. | "Confrontation With the Electric Bees" (MacAlpine, Larry Dennison, Glen Sobel) | 3:27 |
| 8. | "Dr. Garlic Breath" (MacAlpine, Dennison, Sobel) | 3:51 |
| 9. | "Houses in Motion" | 4:33 |
| 10. | "Muffin Bandits" | 2:46 |
| 11. | "Rats With Wings" | 5:25 |
| Total length: | | 43:40 |

== Personnel ==
- Tony MacAlpine – guitar, keyboard, producer
- Gina Demos – guitar (track 4)
- Glen Sobel – drums, producer
- Larry Dennison – bass, producer
- Branford Marsalis – saxophone
- Matt Finders – trombone
- Lee Thornburg – trumpet
- Brian Levi – engineer, mixing, producer
- Colin Mitchell – engineering assistant
- Bernie Grundman – mastering
