= Tony MacAlpine =

American musician and composer (born 1960)

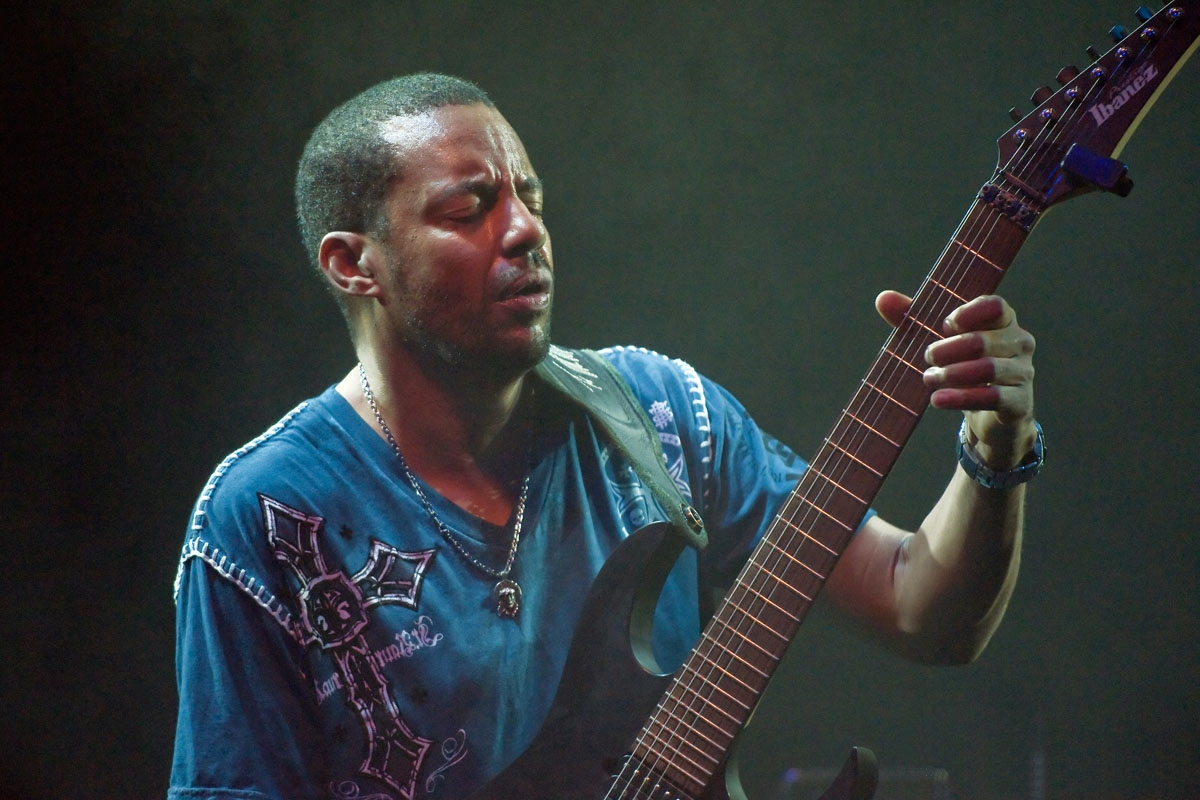
- MacAlpine performing in Zoetermeer, 2012

Background information
- Also known as: T-Mac
- Born: August 29, 1960 (age 66); Springfield, Massachusetts, U.S.
- Genres: Instrumental rock; neoclassical metal; progressive metal; heavy metal; hard rock; jazz fusion
- Occupations: Musician; composer; producer
- Instruments: Guitar, keyboards, piano
- Years active: 1984–present
- Labels: Shrapnel; PolyGram; Favored Nations
- Formerly of: Planet X; Ring of Fire; CAB; Seven the Hardway
- Website: tonymacalpine.com

Tony MacAlpine (born August 29, 1960) is an American musician and composer. In a career spanning four decades, he has released twelve studio albums. MacAlpine is best known as an instrumental rock and heavy metal solo guitarist, although he has worked with many different bands and musicians in guest appearances and collaborations.

== Biography ==
Having started playing piano at the age of five and guitar at twelve, MacAlpine studied classical piano and violin for a number of years at the Springfield Conservatory of Music in Massachusetts, as well as various music programs at the University of Hartford in Connecticut. One of his musical influences is Frédéric Chopin, to whom he pays homage in his interpretations of the latter's études, which are featured on the majority of his studio albums.

Together with his first studio releases, Edge of Insanity (1986) and Maximum Security (1987), he had a prominent role on other works during the popular shred era, including keyboard performances on the debut albums of fellow guitarists Vinnie Moore (Mind's Eye, 1986) and Joey Tafolla (Out of the Sun, 1987). Soon after his own debut, he played guitar in a heavy metal supergroup named M.A.R.S. (MacAlpine/Aldridge/Rock/Sarzo), which resulted in the 1986 album Project: Driver.

As part of a band effort named 'MacAlpine', Eyes of the World was released in 1990 as a more commercially oriented attempt to emulate other hard rock acts at the time. The venture was short-lived, and his subsequent album Freedom to Fly (1992) was a return to his instrumental-based work. A further consecutive string of instrumental albums followed throughout the 1990s, most of them through the renowned Shrapnel Records label: Madness (1993), Premonition (1994), Evolution (1995) and Violent Machine (1996). For his last album of the decade, Master of Paradise (1999), MacAlpine briefly assumed singing duties in an effort to experiment with different styles. After the release of Chromaticity in August 2001, he took an extended hiatus from recording solo albums and worked with a variety of other musicians and bands, most notably with supergroups CAB and Ring of Fire. Nearly a decade later, in June 2011, he released his self-titled eleventh studio album through guitarist Steve Vai's Favored Nations label.

From 2001 to 2005, MacAlpine played both guitar and keyboards in Vai's touring band The Breed. He is featured on the band's DVD release Live at the Astoria London (2003), along with two DVDs of the G3 tour: G3: Live in Denver (2004) and G3: Live in Tokyo (2005). During that time, he was also the guitarist for progressive metal supergroup Planet X, alongside keyboardist Derek Sherinian and drummer Virgil Donati. He played with them for three albums in the first part of the decade—Universe (2000), Live from Oz (2002) and MoonBabies (2002)—and rejoined them in 2009 for a string of live performances, and at that time a possible new album. His most recent collaborations have included Seven the Hardway, a progressive metal group with whom he released their self-titled album in 2010, and a guest appearance on Sherinian's seventh studio album Oceana (2011). In the second half of 2012, MacAlpine toured Europe and Asia as part of PSMS (Portnoy/Sheehan/MacAlpine/Sherinian), an instrumental supergroup. Instrumental Inspirations, a DVD of their live material, was released October 21, 2012. Additionally, in an October 2012 interview, he stated that he was working on new studio material (one of them being a "strictly classical record" recorded solely on piano), as well as a new album with Ring of Fire. Battle of Leningrad, Ring of Fire's fourth studio album, was released on January 28, 2014.

MacAlpine's twelfth studio album, Concrete Gardens, was released on April 21, 2015.

== Style and influence ==
MacAlpine was highly influential in the neoclassical metal genre, becoming known for his instrumental rock style of playing that displays highly advanced shred techniques; one of his most oft-used techniques being 'sweep tapping', a variation of sweep picking. He has incorporated elements of classical, jazz, fusion, hard rock and heavy metal on both guitar and keyboard, and has been described as a virtuoso by Jason Ankeny at AllMusic.

== Equipment ==
- Edge of Insanity: Kramer guitars, DiMarzio pickups, Peavey amplification
- Project: Driver: B.C. Rich guitars, DiMarzio pickups, GHS strings, Peavey and Rockman amplification
- Maximum Security: B.C. Rich guitars, DiMarzio pickups, Peavey amplification, Ibanez effects
- Eyes of the World: Mason Bernard guitars, DiMarzio pickups, Dean Markley strings, Peavey amplification, Baldwin keyboards
- Freedom to Fly: Peavey guitars, Seymour Duncan pickups, GHS strings, Peavey amplification, Baldwin pianos
- Madness: Washburn Mercury series guitars, Seymour Duncan pickups, Dean Markley strings, Hughes & Kettner amplification
- Premonition: Washburn guitars, Seymour Duncan pickups, Dean Markley strings, Hughes & Kettner amplification
- Evolution: B.C. Rich guitars, Seymour Duncan pickups, Hughes & Kettner amplification
- Chromaticity: Carvin guitars and amplification
- Tony MacAlpine: Ibanez guitars, DiMarzio pickups, Ernie Ball strings, Hughes & Kettner amplification, Source Audio effects, Toontrack software

MacAlpine became a prominent user of seven-string guitars after joining Planet X and still plays them regularly, along with eight-string guitars. A long-time endorsee of Carvin guitars (notably the T-Mac and DC series), he switched to Ibanez in 2010. Since 2011 he has played a customized RG Prestige eight-string model with EMG pickups, while his seven- and six-string models use DiMarzios. For amplification, he uses the Hughes & Kettner TriAmp for studio recording and the Coreblade model for live touring. An Ernie Ball wah and volume pedal completes his live setup. A detailed diagram of his 2011 gear can be found at Guitar Geek.

== Personal life ==
MacAlpine currently resides in Pasadena, California. On August 25, 2015, he posted on his Facebook profile that he may have developed colon cancer, which forced cancellation of some dates on his tour to promote Concrete Gardens. In August 2016 he wrote on his personal website, "I have been feeling back to normal and tests indicate that all is well in medical land. Deep and sincere thanks to you all for your wonderful support through this very difficult last 12 months."

MacAlpine also revealed in an interview with Herman Li that, among his traumatic experiences, his wife had died and the release of his new record was a way for him to get back into creativity.

== Discography ==
=== Solo studio albums ===
- 1986: Edge of Insanity
- 1987: Maximum Security
- 1992: Freedom to Fly
- 1993: Madness
- 1994: Premonition
- 1995: Evolution
- 1996: Violent Machine
- 1999: Master of Paradise
- 2001: Chromaticity
- 2011: Tony MacAlpine
- 2015: Concrete Gardens
- 2017: Death of Roses
- 2021: Equilibrium

=== Solo live albums ===
- 1997: Live Insanity

=== Solo compilation albums ===
- 2006: Collection: The Shrapnel Years

=== MacAlpine ===
- 1990: Eyes of the World

=== Vinnie Moore ===
- 1986: Mind's Eye
- 1999: The Maze
- 2006: Collection: The Shrapnel Years (compilation)

=== Planet X ===
- 2000: Universe
- 2002: Live from Oz (live)
- 2002: MoonBabies

=== CAB ===
- 2000: CAB
- 2001: CAB 2
- 2002: CAB Live at The Baked Potato
- 2003: CAB 4
- 2008: Theatre de Marionnettes
- 2010: Live on Sunset
- 2001: CAB Live at the Baked Potato: First and Second Set (DVD)
- 2002: CAB Live at The Musician Institute (DVD)

=== Mark Boals ===
- 2000: Ring of Fire
- 2002: Edge of the World

=== Steve Vai ===
- 2003: Live at the Astoria London
- 2004: G3: Live in Denver
- 2005: G3: Live in Tokyo

=== Ring of Fire (band) ===
- 2003: Dreamtower
- 2004: Burning Live in Tokyo (live)
- 2004: Lapse of Reality
- 2014: Battle of Leningrad

=== Other appearances ===
- 1986: Project: Driver – M.A.R.S. (with Tommy Aldridge, Rob Rock and Rudy Sarzo)
- 1987: Out of the Sun – Joey Tafolla
- 1998: The Quest - Damir Šimić-Shime
- 1999: VK3 – Vitalij Kuprij
- 2004: Eric Clapton's Guitar Festival - "I'm the Hell Out of Here" (with Steve Vai)
- 2007: Clinophobia – Devil's Slingshot (with Virgil Donati and Billy Sheehan)
- 2007: Ze re Tour 2007 – Michel Polnareff
- 2010: On Revolute – Dave Weiner
- 2010: Seven the Hardway – Seven the Hardway (with Virgil Donati and Mark Boals)
- 2011: Oceana – Derek Sherinian
- 2012: Plains of Oblivion – Jeff Loomis
- 2012: Instrumental Inspirations – PSMS (with Mike Portnoy, Billy Sheehan and Derek Sherinian) (DVD)
- 2013: Live in Tokyo – PSMS (with Mike Portnoy, Billy Sheehan and Derek Sherinian)
- 2018: Enfin! – Michel Polnareff
