= Philip Bynoe =

- Genres: Instrumental rock, Hard rock, Heavy metal, R&B, Jazz
- Instruments: Bass guitar, keyboards, cello

Philip Earl Bynoe is an American musician best known for his work with Steve Vai. He has been the bass player of Vai's touring band since 2012, a role he previously held from 1996 to 2000. He has also played on four of Vai's studio albums.

Other artists Bynoe has worked with include Kevin Eubanks and The Tonight Show Band, Dorian Holley, Slash, and Charlie Farren. He has been a member of the heavy metal band Warlord since 2013, and was formerly a member of Ring of Fire.

Bynoe attended the Berklee College of Music in Boston. He studied with Wit Brown. He changed bands several times in the ensuing years, until Nuno Bettencourt of Extreme introduced Bynoe to drummer Mike Mangini. Bynoe and Mangini played together in the Rick Berlin Band. They entered and won a rhythm section competition in Massachusetts. Mangini later got Bynoe an audition with Steve Vai.

Bynoe has received three Grammy Award nominations for his work. In 2005, he received an Emmy Award for his work on the soundtrack for a remake of Reefer Madness. Bynoe continues recording, touring and playing. He also teaches bass and ensemble work at the L.A. Music Academy in Pasadena.

Now playing with A - Z (2025).

Bynoe appears on the soundtrack of the 2008 film Repo! The Genetic Opera.
