= Gianfranco Continenza =

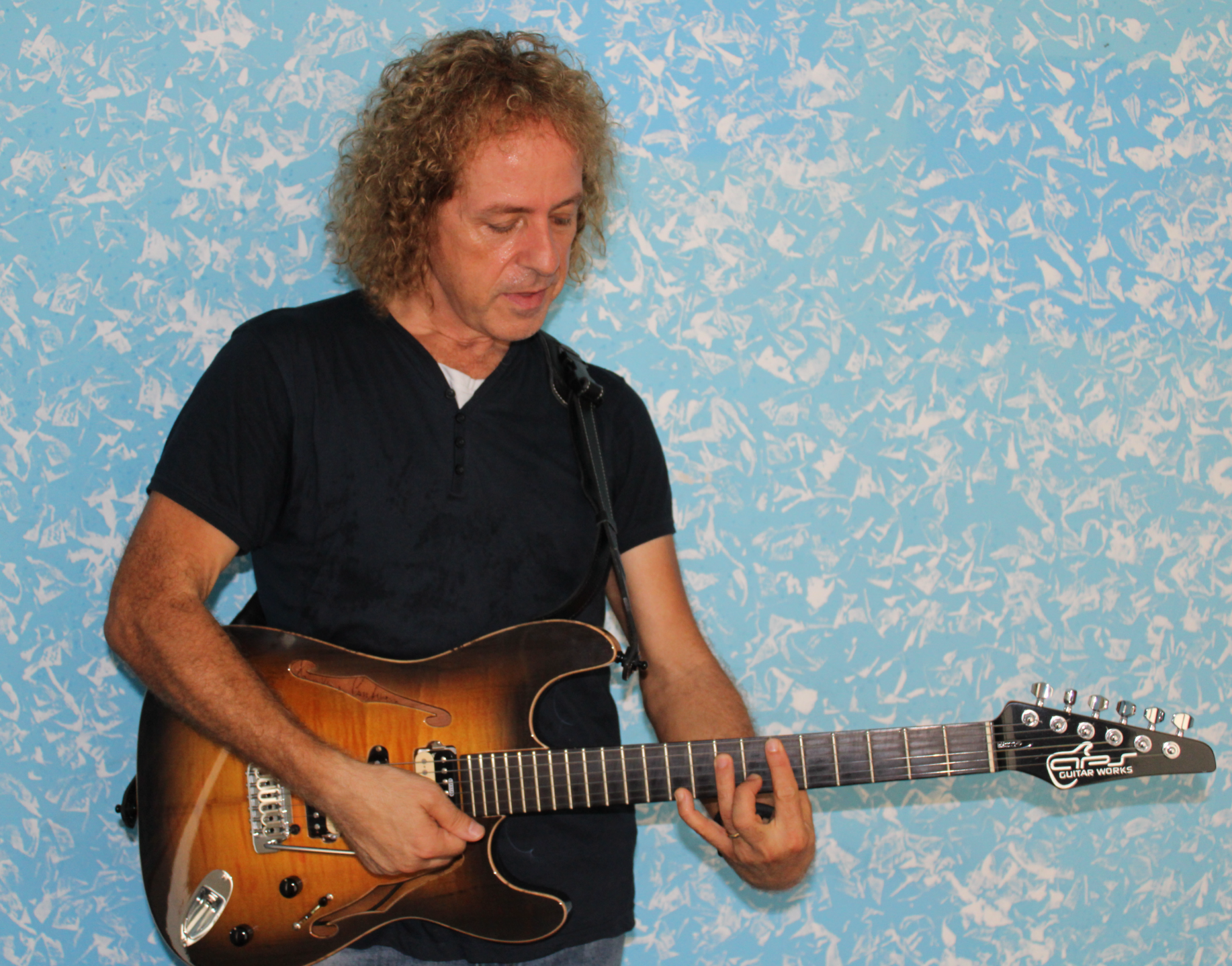

Background information
- Born: February 1, 1968 (age 58); Turin, Italy
- Genres: Jazz; Jazz fusion; Funk
- Occupations: musician, composer, author
- Instrument: guitar
- Years active: 1986-present
- Labels: ESC Records, Videoradio, Never Sleeping Records
- Website: gianfrancocontinenza.com

Gianfranco Continenza (born February 1, 1968) is an Italian guitarist from Pescara, Abruzzo.

== Biography ==
He approached the study of the guitar at the age of 8, learning the basics from his father Nino, jazz guitarist, and listening to Miles Davis, Wes Montgomery, John Coltrane, Charlie Parker, Bill Evans, Oscar Peterson, as well as Jimi Hendrix, Led Zeppelin, Deep Purple, Van Halen.

He moved with his family from Turin, where he was born, to Pescara, he played in several local bands and in 1986 he recorded the guitar in two songs, "At the End of the Last Chapter" and "Lucy Cruel", respectively third track of side A and first track of side B of the LP Hard Incursion by the Unreal Terror, considered one of the most promising Italian heavy metal bands of that years.

In September 1992 he graduated with honors from the Musicians Institute in Hollywood, California, specializing in different musical styles, from jazz and jazz-fusion to rock, from blues and funk to Latin music.

His teachers Joe Diorio, Scott Henderson, Don Mock, Jeff Berlin, Jennifer Batten, Gary Willis, Howard Roberts, Jamie Findlay, Jeff Richman, Mike Miller, Peter Sprague, Ron Eschéte, Steve Trovato and Tommy Tedesco, particularly influenced his musical style, which is characterized by the use of complex rhythmic, harmonic and melodic textures, such as odd and mixed time signature, quartal harmonies and modal scales, as well as for the application of techniques such as the dispersion of the octave, the chromatic passages, the extended intervals, the superimposed scales, the string skipping and other.

Back in Italy, he joined his career as a composer with that of teacher at the P.M.I. (Professional Musicians Institute), the C.M.A. (Contemporary Music Academy), the conservatory of music "Luisa D'Annunzio" in Pescara and in masterclass, performing live and studio music, and gained acclaim as a fusion guitar wizard.

In 2008 he participated in the Bratislava Jazz Days, considered one of the most important festivals of European jazz music, in which it was also filmed in Italy as part of a special by Rai 3 dedicated to him.

In 2016 he performed in concert in Tirana, Albania, and was a guest of the television programs Top Show and Wake Up broadcast by Top Channel.

In Italy he has participated in various jazz festivals, including the Fiorenza Jazz '03 of Fermo, the Jazz sotto la torre of Palena of 2008, and the Eddie Lang Jazz Festival of Monteroduni of 2023.

In 2000 he performed with the Cuban percussionist Ernesto Rodríguez Guzmán, known as Ernesttico, and the Neapolitan bassist Pippo Matino at the historic Kabala Jazz Club in Pescara, where was recorded the bootleg CD Live At Kabala Jazz Club.

Together with the bassist Francis Hylton and the drummer Rick Latham, he founded the trio HCL Funk Reaction (the acronym HCL consists of the initials of the surnames of the three members, Hylton, Continenza, Latham).

His first solo album, The Past Inside The Present, featuring Dante Melena, Maurizio Rolli, Angelo Trabucco, Scott Kinsey, and Bill Evans, reached number one in ranks among the top 100 albums in the jazz-fusion category of Tower Records, and was the second best-selling album by ESC Records in 2008.

Dusting The Time, his second album, to which collaborated Dino D'Autorio, Lorenzo Feliciati, Mark Egan, Michael Manring, Tetsuo Sakurai, Adriano Brunelli, Federico Righi, Walter Martino, Don Mock, Sergey Boykov, Alessandro Centofanti, Ernesttico, John Beasley, Bob Mintzer, Enrico Corli, Nicolo Pasello, Emanuele Marchi and Paolo Marchi, was highly appreciated by critics and in 2014 was also reviewed in USA as one of the best jazz-fusion records of the year.

In 2019 was released his third album Vertical Horizons with the collaboration of the bassist Michael Manring and the drummer Oreste Sbarra.

His interpretation of John McLaughlin's "One Word" was included in the 2008 collection Mahavishnu Re-Defined - A Tribute To John McLaughlin, a double album of 24 tracks written or inspired by the British guitarist, conceived by guitarist Jeff Richman who recruited famous guitarists to rework the classical material of the Mahavishnu Orchestra.

His original song "Mahavishnology" was included in the 2010 collection Mahavishnu Re-Defined II - A Tribute To John McLaughlin, the second volume in double album of the musical project Mahavishnu Re-Defined, in which Gianfranco Continenza participated, among others, with Surinder Sandhu, Steve Vai, David Torn, Allen Hinds, George Colligan, Kai Eckhardt and Michael Manring.

His original song "Back to Beck"was included in the collection The Loner 2 - A Tribute To Jeff Beck, a double album of 24 tracks dedicated to the iconic British guitarist, released in the 2014 by ESC Records.

He collaborated on the studio recordings of the albums of Adriano Brunelli, Sergey Boykov, Massimo Severino and Nicola Trivarelli.

He collaborates as consultant, endorser and demonstrator with DV Mark, Mama Pickups and Fattoria Mendoza companies.

He plays Jacoland and APS guitars, for which he designed his own GC signature models.

The Heaven Jazz “Gianfranco Continenza Signature” guitar, meticulously studied together with the Parma luthier Fausto Fiorini, was presented in September 2007, in Milan, at the MEET, the Italian organization that supports digital culture and creative technology.

He edits several jazz guitar columns and publishes jazz-fusion guitar lessons in various magazines, including Chitarre and Guitar Club, in Italy, and Just Jazz Guitar in the US.

In 2019 he published a guitar method on the creative use of modal scales in improvisation, with foreword by Mark Egan.

== Discography ==
=== As leader ===
- 2008 The Past Inside The Present (ESC)
- 2011 Face the Truth, (ESC)
- 2013 Dusting the Time (Videoradio)
- 2019 Vertical Horizons (Never Sleeping)

=== As sideman ===
- 1986 Unreal Terror, Hard Incursion (Action Label Productions)
- 2008 Adriano Brunelli, Art of B(r)ass (Adriano Brunelli)
- 2014 Sergey Boykov, Falling Skies (Power Prog)
- 2017 Massimo Severino, The Branched Tree Jazz Suite in 6 Movements (Hydra Music)
- 2018 Nicola Trivarelli Project Organ Trio, Strange Kind of Blues (Real Illusions)
- 2021 Alessandro Chiozzi, Circulating Energy (Settetre Music)

== Bibliography ==
- 2019 - Il chitarrista Jazz/Fusion e l’improvvisazione modale creativa (Masciulli Edizioni).
