= Valvassori =

Valvassori is an Italian surname from Lombardy, literally meaning 'Vavasours'. Notable people with the surname include:

- Domenico Valvassori (1627–1689), Italian Roman Catholic prelate
- Gabriele Valvassori (1683–1761), Italian architect
- Giuseppe Valvassori (fl. 18th century), Italian architect
- Leonardo Valvassori, American-Canadian bassist, cellist and audio engineer

== See also ==
- Vavassori
