= Musicians Institute =

Private music school in Los Angeles, California

- Former names: Guitar Institute of Technology; Musicians Institute of Technology
- Type: Private for-profit music school
- Established: 1977
- President: Todd Berhorst
- Faculty: 450
- Students: 1,425
- Location: Los Angeles, California, United States; 34°06′03″N 118°20′14″W
- Campus: Urban
- Website: mi.edu

Musicians Institute (MI) is a private for-profit music school in Los Angeles, California. MI students can earn Certificates and – with transfer of coursework taken at Los Angeles City College – Associate of Arts Degrees, as well as Bachelor of Music Degrees in either Performance or Composition. The college was founded in 1977.

== History ==
=== Founders Howard Roberts and Pat Hicks ===
Musicians Institute was founded as The Guitar Institute of Technology in 1977 as a one-year vocational school of guitarists and bassists. Its curriculum and pedagogical style was shaped by guitarist Howard Roberts (1929–1992). Pat Hicks (né Patrick Carroll Hicks; born 1934), a Los Angeles music industry entrepreneur, was the co-founder of Musicians Institute. He is credited for providing the organizational structure and management that rapidly transformed Howard Roberts' educational philosophy into a major music school. The school opened in March 1977 with three guitar instructors: Joe Diorio, Ron Eschete and Don Mock. Mock, a Seattle guitarist whom Roberts had brought to Los Angeles, taught full-time until 1983 and contributed to the development of the guitar curriculum; he later directed and produced instructional guitar videos for the school.

Programs added under Roberts and Hicks include:

- 1978: Bass Institute of Technology (BIT)
- 1980: Percussion Institute of Technology (PIT)
- 1987: Vocal Institute of Technology (VIT)
- 1991: Keyboard Institute of Technology (KIT)
- 1993: Recording Institute of Technology (RIT)
- 1994: Bachelor of Music Degree

=== Early curricular offerings ===
At the time of its founding, formal education in rock and roll at institutions of higher learning was limited mostly to universities and conservatories offering jazz studies, which were few. At the founding of the Musicians Institute, Jazz studies was, and is today, a strong component of the curricular offerings. In early days of the Musicians Institute, the demand for musicians and music industry professionals with comprehensive collegiate credentials in the field of contemporary music was low. Yet, the demand for contemporary music professionals was high. Roberts, when he founded the school, wanted to give aspiring rock and roll musicians a conservatory experience. Nowadays, comprehensive music education in higher education, from bachelors to doctorates, covers rock and roll from several perspectives, including literature, musicology, history, performing arts, technology, business, and law. For musicians working towards degrees in performance, proficiency in rock and roll is standard, particularly for aspiring session musicians.

The rise of contemporary musicians holding comprehensive academic credentials over the last 50 years is partly the result of more universities offering programs in the field, which, in turn, has increased the demand for contemporary oriented music educators with academic credentials at universities. Because the Musicians Institute was an innovator in rock and roll in higher education – and thirty-two years ago began offering bachelor of music degrees – its alumni are well-represented as educators of contemporary music at institutions of higher learning.

Japanese businessman Hisatake Shibuya (born 1937) bought the school in 1994 and Musicians Institute began developing new programs to keep abreast of the modern music industry. Programs added under Shibuya include:

- 2000: Independent Artist Program (IAP)
- 2000: Audio Engineering
- 2000: Guitar Craft Academy (GCA)
- 2002: Music Business Program (MBP)
- 2016: DJ Performance and Production (DJP)
- 2016: Associate of Science in Music Business (AS.MB)
- 2017: MI Online (MIO)
- 2018: Artist Producer and Entrepreneur (APE)
- 2018: Master in Music Degree (MM)

On 25 August 2007, the Los Angeles City Council adopted a resolution declaring 25 August 2007, "Musicians Institute Day in the City of Los Angeles" in recognition of its achievements over three decades during its 30th anniversary celebration. The resolution was presented by Eric Garcetti, seconded by Tom LaBonge, and passed by a vote of twelve to zero out of fifteen, three being absent.

=== Former institutional and division names ===
Active names

- MI College of Contemporary Music™ (service mark & trade mark) (Note: "MI College of Contemporary Music™," United States Patent and Trademark Office Reg. No. 4662703, 20 December 2014 Reg. No. 4659008, 23 December 2014)
- MI Connects™ (service mark) (Note: "MI Connects™," United States Patent and Trademark Office Reg. No. 4056217, 5 November 2011) – online talent resource for students and alumni
- MI Musicians Institute™ (Note: "MI Musicians Institute™," United States Patent and Trademark Office Reg. No. 3630659, 2 June 2009 Reg. No. 3630655, 2 June 2009 Reg. No. 3380297, 12 February 2008 Reg. No. 3380290, 12 February 2008 Reg. No. 1598974, 29 May 1990)
- Guitar Craft Academy™ – for the design, construction, and maintenance of guitars and basses

Trademark names of Campus Hollywood

- Tricycle Entertainment™ (service mark – abandoned in 2004)

Former names

- Guitar Institute of Technology (service mark – became inactive 22 June 1990)
- Vocal Institute of Technology (service mark – became inactive 19 May 1989) (Note: "Vocal Institute of Technology™," United States Patent and Trademark Office Reg. 6 September 1988 Abandoned 19 May 1989)
- Bass Institute of Technology
- Percussion Institute of Technology
- Keyboard Institute of Technology
- Recording Institute of Technology (trademark – became inactive 5 December 2005)
- Film Institute of Technology (trademark – became inactive 5 December 2005)
- Encore Program
- World Institute of Percussion (launched in 1987)

Trademark notes

== Academics ==
The Musicians Institute offers instrumental performance programs for bass, drums, guitar, keyboard technology, and vocals. Music industry programs include audio engineering, Independent Artist Program, the Guitar Craft Academy and Music Business. The school offers Associate of Arts, Associate of Science, and Bachelor of Music degrees in addition to certificates.

The Institute of International Education, in its assessment of "Top 40 Specialized Institutions, 2009/10," from its publication, International Students: Leading Institutions by Institutional Type, ranked Musicians Institute 13 in the United States out of 40. Musicians Institute and its programs are registered by the state of California by the Bureau for Private Postsecondary Education. It has been an accredited institutional member of the National Association of Schools of Music (NASM) since 1981.

In 1992, new musicologist Robert Walser cited the Musicians Institute as one of the best-known schools for guitarist, one that has flourished outside the ivory tower, offering students broader professional training. But a trade-off, according to a review in the October 2012 issue of Performer Magazine, is that a lack of academic accreditation – specifically from the Western Association of Schools and Colleges – can make it challenging for students to transfer credits from MI to academic institutions. To meet the academic criteria for a Bachelor of Music Degree – 45 quarter units or 30 semester units in liberal arts – the Musicians Institute has a partnership with nearby Los Angeles City College (LACC) to study English, mathematics, natural science, social science, and humanities. LACC is accredited by the Western Association of Schools and Colleges (Note: "Musicians Institute 2013 & 2014 Course Catalog" (Archived 7 January 2015 at the Wayback Machine), p. 8) The Carnegie Foundation has designated the Musicians Institute as a "Special Focus Institute in Music."

== Facilities and constituent institutions ==
MI began in second floor rooms above Hollywood Wax Museum on Hollywood Boulevard. When MI celebrated its 30th anniversary in 2007, its facilities included over 75,000 square feet of studios, performance venues, classrooms, and practice rooms across several blocks in central Hollywood. In 2013, the Musician's Institute Stage was added as a venue for the Annual Mayhem Festival and The ESP Company, LTD, unveiled plans to expand its Campus Hollywood complex of schools in Los Angeles. From 2010 to 2013, ESP invested $47 million in new property with plans to expand its facility to exceed 180,000 square feet of adjoining buildings on or near Highland Avenue between Hollywood Blvd. and Sunset Boulevard as part of a reorganization and upgrade of existing Campus Hollywood properties that accommodate the Musicians Institute, Theatre of Arts, International Dance Academy, and Elegance International. The new facilities were planned to include a performance venue, student dormitory, and parking lots.

Constituent institutions of Campus Hollywood, Inc.:

1. Musicians Institute
2. Theatre of Arts, an acting school founded in 1927
3. Elegance International, a school for professional makeup artists
4. Los Angeles College of Music
5. International Dance Academy Hollywood

International sister educational institutions:

1. MI Japan (ja) – Tokyo, Osaka, Nagoya, Sendai and Fukuoka
2. UTB Video Academy (ja), Chiyoda, Tokyo, founded in 1998 under the auspices of United Television Broadcasting Systems, Inc. (ja)
3. ESP Entertainment, Kita-ku, Osaka

Other entities closely held by Hisatake Shibuya:

1. Hollywood Entertainment ESL, founded as a California corporation in 2012, active (as of 2015)
2. ESP Investment Holdings, Inc., founded as a California corporation in 2010, active (as of 2015)
3. ESP Gakuen, founded as a Japan corporation in 2001, registered as a foreign non-profit corporation in California, active (as of 2015)
4. Schecter Guitar Research, acquired by Shibuya in 1987 – Hisatake Shibuya, President
5. ESP Company, Limited, doing business as ESP Guitars, founded by Shibuya in 1975
6. United Television Broadcasting Systems, Inc. (ja), a Japanese language television station based in Los Angeles and syndicated in Japan
7. E.S.P. Shibuya Enterprises, Inc., founded as a California corporation in 1998, active (as of 2015)

Inactive entities that were closely held by Hisatake Shibuya:

1. Tricycle Records, Inc., founded as a California corporation in 2001, dissolved
2. ESP Co., LTD., doing business in California as ESP Real Estate Investment, Inc., registration surrendered
3. Entertainment Enterprises Hollywood, Inc., founded as a California corporation, dissolved
4. CHMG, Inc., founded as a California corporation, no longer active
5. Hollywood Pop Academy, Inc., founded in 2003 as a California corporation, no longer active

== Musicians Institute Press ==
The Musicians Institute Press is a division of the Musicians Institute, and is focused on instructional publications – print and video – by instructors of guitar, bass, drums, vocals, and film editing, audio engineering, composition, arranging, musicology, music theory, sight reading, sight singing, and the entertainment business. The publications are distributed by the Musicians Institute and Hal Leonard Corporation Performing Arts Publishing Group. Since 1997, the publishing imprint has been the "Musicians Institute Press." Before that, from about 1982 to 1997, the imprint was "Musicians Institute Publications."

== Notable faculty ==
Faculty – current and former

Guitar

- Chris Broderick
- Dean Brown
- Joe Diorio
- Don Mock
- Ron Eschete (Note: "Ron Eschete Interview", by Doug Perkins, Jazz Guitar Society blog (www.jazzguitarsociety.com), 12 September 2014 (retrieved 2 January 20145))
- Brett Garsed
- Paul Gilbert
- Jude Gold
- Scott Henderson (Note: "Henderson, Scott", Oxford Music Online, Oxford University Press (retrieved 5 January 2015); OCLC 5576124099)
- Steve Lynch
- Alex Machacek
- Pat Martino
- Doug Rappoport
- Howard Roberts
- Dale Turner
- Carl Verheyen
- Dave Weiner
- Keith Wyatt
- David Oakes
- Jamie Glaser
- Dave Hill
- Joe Elliott
- Jennifer Batten

Bass guitar

- Tim Bogert
- Louis Johnson
- Stuart Hamm
- Bob Magnusson
- Chuck Rainey
- Alexis Sklarevski
- Greg Weiss (son of Larry Weiss)

Vocal

- Debra Byrd, Chair (Note: "'Voice' Coach Debra Byrd Named Vocal Chair at Musicians Institute", by Michele Amabile Angermiller, Billboard, 4 October 2013)
- Anika Peress

Percussion

- Cengiz Baysal (tr)
- Efa Etoroma
- Chuck Flores
- Horacio Hernandez
- Thomas Lang
- Glen Sobel
- Ralph Humphrey

Keyboards

- Russell Ferrante
- Carl Schroeder
- Steve Weingart

Audio engineering

- TJ Helmerich

Music Industry, entrepreneurship

- Don Grierson
- Vicky Hamilton

Independent Artist program

- Lisa Harriton, Chair
- Marko DeSantis

Original Song Pre-Production

- Richie Zito

Guest instructors – current and former

Guitar

- Jimmy Boyle
- Kim Carroll
- Marty Friedman
- Steve Vai

Bass guitar

- Jaco Pastorius
- Alphonso Johnson
- Patrick "Putter" Smith
- Gary Willis

Percussion

- Thomas Lang
- Dom Famularo

Guitar Craft Academy

- Howard R. Paul

== Notable alumni ==
- Sharon Aguilar
- Howard Alden (Note: Howard Alden (DVD), Hamilton College Jazz Archive (2003); OCLC 55628013, 895054200)
- Juan Alderete
- Shane Alexander
- Ioannis Anastassakis (el)
- Viktoria Andersson (sv)
- Mateus Asato(br)
- Corrado Sgandurra (it)
- John Ballinger
- Jennifer Batten
- Cengiz Baysal (tr)
- David Becker
- Jean Marc Belkadi
- Jeff Berlin
- Curt Bisquera
- Roberto Bossard (de)
- Jimmy Boyle
- Rolf Brendel (de)
- Gunnlaugur Briem (de)
- Bishop Briggs
- Norman Brown (Note: The International Who's Who in Popular Music 2002, Andy Gregory (ed.), Europa Publications (2002); p. 65; OCLC 50172992 ISSN 1740-0163)
- Jeff Buckley (Note: "Extract from Dream Brother: The Lives And Music Of Jeff And Tim Buckley The Guardian, 16 December 2000 (Retrieved 13 September 2011))
- Bruce “Buck” Cameron
- Mike Campese
- Joacim Cans
- Sydnei Carvalho (br)
- Giacomo Castellano (it)
- Alberto Cereijo (es)
- Jeffero Chan (zh)
- Hinson Chou Tsz Yeung (zh)
- Tanya Chua
- Alessandro Cortini
- Rivers Cuomo
- ermi osman
- Demir Demirkan
- Marcus Deml (de)
- Michael Denning
- Francesco DiCosmo
- Kenan Doğulu
- Greg Edmonson
- Peter Engberg (fi)
- Backa Hans Eriksson (sv)
- Emil Ernebro (sv)
- Gustav Eurén (sv)
- Big Chris Flores
- Kevin Fowler
- John Frusciante
- Shane Gaalaas
- Frank Gambale (Note: "Gambale, Frank", Oxford Music Online, Oxford University Press (retrieved 5 January 2015); OCLC 5576125358)
- Greg Garman (es)
- Synyster Gates
- Isabell Gerschke (de)
- Terje Gewelt (Note: "Gewelt, Terje", Oxford Music Online, Oxford University Press (retrieved 5 January 2015); OCLC 5576124406)
- Roney "Giah" Giacometti
- Paul Gilbert
- Kat Graham
- Shruti Haasan
- Kenya Hagihara (ja)
- Scott Henderson
- Tony Hernando (es)
- Magos Herrera
- Jimmy Herring
- Rick Hill
- Allen Hinds
- Pelle Holmberg (sv)
- Gabriel Improta (pt)
- Cherno Jobatey (de)
- Amaire Johnson
- R.J.Jones (sv)
- Elli Kokkinou
- Folayan Kunerede
- Dave Kushner
- Charles Olivier
- Wolfgang Laab (de)
- Lex Lang
- Daniel LeBlanc
- JinJoo Lee
- Chris Letchford
- LaToya London
- Ray Luzier
- Matt McJunkins
- Christopher Maloney
- Guernica Mancini
- Paul Masvidal
- Meja
- Miri Miettinen (fi)
- Nikki Misery
- Teri Moïse (nl)
- Sonny Moorman
- Rafael Moreira
- Taps Mugadza
- OX (aka Samer El Nahhal)
- Naomi Namasenda
- Ant Neely
- Ehsaan Noorani
- Mark O'Leary
- Stefan Olsdal
- Naoki Osawa (ja)
- Anderson .Paak
- Phillip Michael Pacetti
- Mimi Page
- Toss Panos
- Satchel
- Patiparn Pataweekarn
- Marcus Paus
- Anel Paz
- Francisco Pachi Paz
- Ridho Hafiedz (ind)
- Rio (né Takeshi Kubo) (ja)
- Yannick Robert (fr)
- Rose Villain (né Rosa Luini) (it)
- Constantine Roussos
- Mitsuhisa Sakamoto (ja)
- Ilya Salmanzadeh
- John Shanks
- Scott Shriner
- Kelly Simonz (ja)
- Marcus Singletary
- Micah Sloat
- Chad Smith
- Ashwin Sood
- Jorma Styng (fi)
- Midori Tatematsu
- Bobbi Taylor
- Shane Theriot
- Carl August Tidemann
- Jasmine (né Chu Ting)
- Jerry Torr
- Les Townsend
- Steve Vai (Honorary)
- Leonardo Valvassori
- Eric Vandenberg
- Jakob Wahlberg (sv)
- Brooke White
- Nick Wong (zh)
- Aguai Wu (zh)
- Keith Wyatt
- Yammy (ja)
- Jennifer York
- Jeff Young
- Bibi Zhou
- Jeff Zwart (nl)

Language codes

hr = Croatian
de = German
el = Greek
es = Spanish
fi = Finnish
fr = French
ja = Japanese
it = Italian
nl = Dutch
pt = Portuguese
sv = Swedish
tr = Turkish
zh = Chinese
