= Irene Reid =

American jazz singer

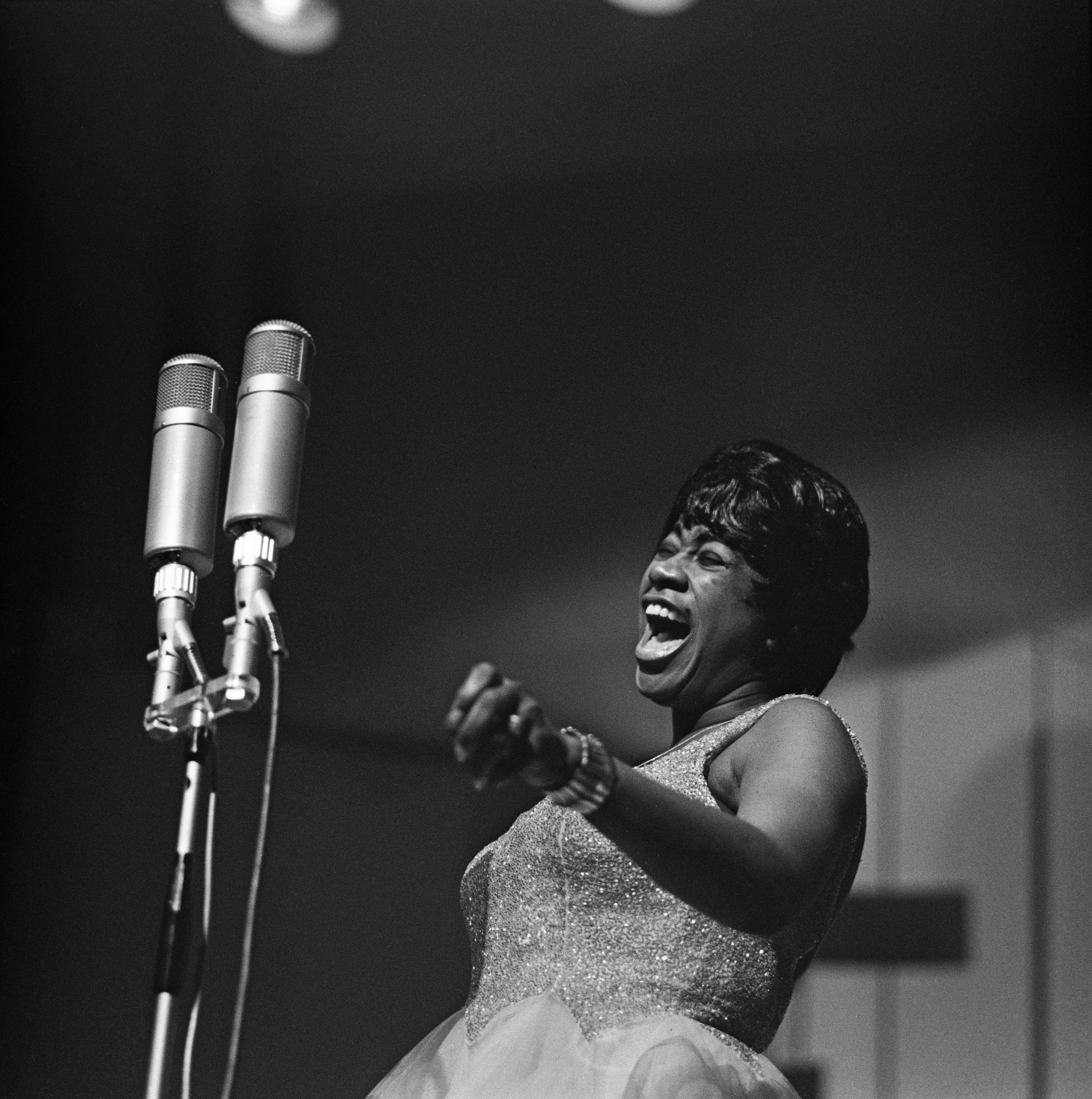
Irene Reid in 1962

Irene Reid (September 23, 1930 – January 5, 2008) was an American jazz singer.

== Early life ==
Reid was born and raised in Savannah, Georgia. She sang in church and in high school in Georgia, and moved to New York City in 1947 after her mother died.

== Career ==
Toward the end of 1947, she tried out for an amateur contest at the Apollo Theater in Harlem, and won the competition for five straight weeks. Soon after she was offered a slot as the featured vocalist with Dick Vance at the Savoy Ballroom, which she held from 1948 to 1950.

In 1961–62, Reid sang with Count Basie's orchestra, and recorded for Verve Records. She later performed in a Broadway production of the musical The Wiz. Additionally, she sang with Carmen McRae, Sarah Vaughan, Aretha Franklin, and B.B. King. Reid receded from fame in the 1970s and 1980s, but launched a comeback near the end of that decade. She appeared at the Savannah Jazz Festival in 1991, 1994, and 1996, and continued releasing albums on Savant Records in the 1990s and 2000s.

== Discography ==
- It's Only the Beginning (MGM, 1963)
- Room for One More (Verve, 1965)
- It's Too Late (Verve, 1966)
- A Man Only Does (What a Woman Makes Him Do) (Verve, 1967)
- I've Been Here All The Time... (Barry, 1968)
- The World Needs What I Need (Polydor, 1970)
- Two of Us (Glades, 1976)
- The Lady from Savannah (Birdland, 1989)
- Million Dollar Secret (Savant, 1997)
- I Ain't Doing Too Bad (Savant, 1999)
- The Uptown Lowdown (Savant, 2000)
- One Monkey Don't Stop No Show (Savant, 2002)
- Movin' Out (Savant, 2003)
- Thanks to You (Savant, 2004)
- The Queen of the Party: The Uptown Blues of Irene Reid (Savant, 2012)

With Count Basie

- Back with Basie (Roulette, 1962)
- Basie in Sweden (Roulette, 1962)

== Death ==
She died on January 5, 2008, from a cardiac arrest, aged 77.
