= Robert Benedetto =

American luthier of archtop jazz guitars

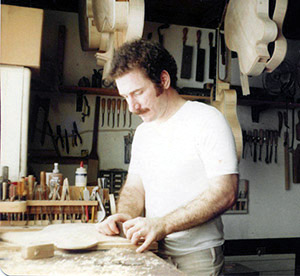
- Robert Benedetto in his shop, circa 1976
- Born: October 22, 1946 (age 79); The Bronx, New York City, New York, U.S.
- Occupation: Luthier
- Website: Benedetto Guitars

Robert Benedetto (born October 22, 1946, in The Bronx, New York) is an American luthier of archtop jazz guitars. In 1968, he made his first archtop guitar in New Jersey and has handcrafted nearly 850 musical instruments. His guitars appear on many recordings, videos, and TV and film soundtracks, and have been featured in books, magazines and museums (including the permanent collection of the Smithsonian Institution's National Museum of American History and the National Guitar Museum).

By the 1970s (he relocated to Florida in 1976), his reputation grew as he crafted archtop guitars for professional jazz players Bucky Pizzarelli, Chuck Wayne, Joe Diorio and Cal Collins, and in the 80s and 90s for Johnny Smith, Jack Wilkins, Ron Eschete, Martin Taylor, Howard Alden, John Pizzarelli, Andy Summers, Jimmy Bruno, Kenny Burrell and Pat Martino, among others, collectively known as “The Benedetto Players”. More recent jazz guitarists who play Benedetto guitars include Dan Faehnle, Joe Negri, Taylor Roberts, Chico Pinheiro and Andreas Varady.

Benedetto married Cindy Whyte in 1975 who has photographed and extensively documented Robert’s guitars and their players. In 1983, Benedetto began making violins for both orchestra and jazz artists. His most notable endorser was Stephane Grappelli.

In 1990 Benedetto relocated to East Stroudsburg, Pennsylvania. Shortly thereafter, in 1992, he offered an archtop guitar making course at his shop. In 1994 he published his book Making An Archtop Guitar, followed in 1996 with his instructional DVD Archtop Guitar Design & Construction. That same year Cindy organized the first of the ongoing Benedetto Players in Concert series.

Also in 1996, Benedetto made “La Cremona Azzurra” a blue archtop guitar commissioned by guitar collector Scott Chinery and exhibited at the Smithsonian Institution. Benedetto’s Blue Guitar was featured on the Smithsonian’s commemorative Blue Guitar poster.

In 2000, he published full-scale blueprints of a 17" Benedetto archtop guitar, followed in 2004 by the Mel Bay production of Benedetto: Body and Soul DVD, a biography by William Doyle.

From 1999 to 2006, Benedetto had a licensing agreement with Fender Musical Instruments to produce his models in their Custom Shop. He also redesigned the Guild Artist Award (later the Johnny Smith Award) and the Guild Stuart X-700.

In 2006, Benedetto ended his seven year licensing agreement with Fender and partnered with businessman/guitarist Howard Paul to open a small manufacturing facility in Savannah, Georgia, where the Benedetto staff makes a full line of archtop guitars.

In 2014, Benedetto partnered with Bill Neale to make Benedetto Amps, a line of American-made jazz amps.

In 2018, a Benedetto 50th Anniversary concert was presented by the Savannah Music Festival featuring Howard Alden, Chico Pinheiro, Romero Lubambo, "King" Solomon Hicks and Pat Martino. The Second Edition of his book "Making an Archtop Guitar" was published in 2018 (Centerstream Publishing/Hal Leonard ISBN 9781574243550).
