= Mort Weiss =

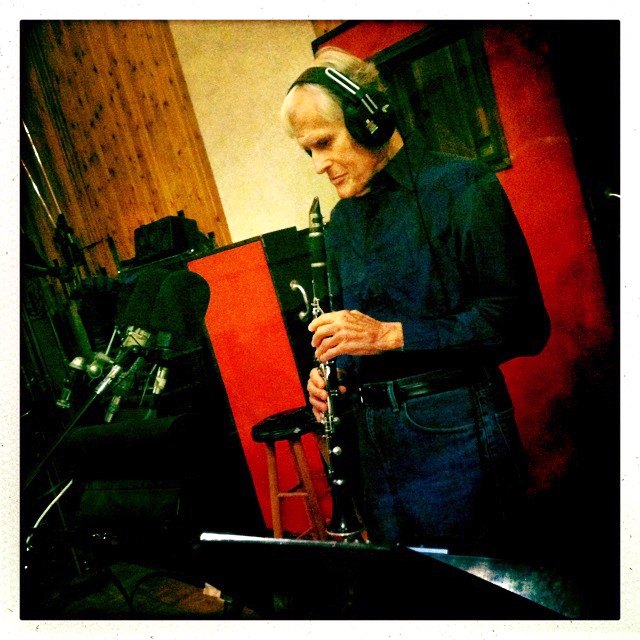

Background information
- Born: April 20, 1935; Philadelphia, Pennsylvania, U.S.
- Died: October 13, 2021 (aged 86) Woodbridge, Virginia, U.S.
- Genres: jazz
- Occupation: musician
- Instruments: clarinet, tenor saxophone
- Label: SMS Jazz

Mort Weiss (April 20, 1935 – October 13, 2021) was an American jazz clarinet player. On his first album as leader he performed with Joey DeFrancesco on the Hammond B3 organ, featured also on his second album B3 and Me (recorded in 2003 but not released until 2006). According to Scott Yanow, "Clarinet-organ groups are far from common. In fact, prior to Mort Weiss' debut CD with organist Joey DeFrancesco, it is possible that combination had never been utilized before." Weiss has performed with Bill Cunliffe, Sam Most, Ramon Banda, Dave Carpenter, Roy McCurdy, and Luther Hughes and has written essays for the website All About Jazz.

Weiss died October 13, 2021, in Woodbridge, Virginia, from a heart failure, at the age of 86.

== Career ==
Weiss began clarinet lessons when he was nine years old. After moving with his family to Los Angeles, he continued playing classical music. During his teens he studied with clarinetist Antonio Remondi of the Los Angeles Philharmonic Orchestra. After graduation and a year at the Westlake School of Music, the teenage Weiss soloed on T.V. programs with the Freddie Martin Orchestra, a.k.a. The Band of Tomorrow.

Weiss' exposure to jazz began with Dixieland. But when he heard a Charlie Parker record, he was hooked. He frequented jazz clubs, participating in after-hours jam sessions, and spending many hours in the woodshed honing his craft. Clarinetist Buddy DeFranco became his idol.

At the age of 19, Weiss was drafted into the Armed Services and played tenor saxophone in the Army band. In the ten years following his discharge, there was a dearth of work for jazz clarinetists and the tenor saxophone became his bread and butter. Weiss' life became lounges, minor jazz clubs, and work in R&B bands.

In the summer of 2001, Weiss read an advertising flyer that asked "Do You Want to Play Jazz?" It was enough to make him begin practicing and invite guitarist Ron Eschete to jam. Their collaboration led to a recording session that became No Place to Hide, the first album on Weiss's label SMS Jazz.

== Discography ==
- No Place to Hide (SMS Jazz, 2002)
- Mort Weiss Meets Joey Defrancesco (SMS Jazz, 2002)
- The Mort Weiss Quartet (SMS Jazz, 2002)
- The Four of Us: Live at Steamers (SMS Jazz, 2005)
- All Too Soon (SMS Jazz, 2008)
- Raising the Bar (SMS Jazz, 2009)
- I'll Be Seeing You (SMS Jazz, 2012)
