= Thundermother =

Swedish hard rock band

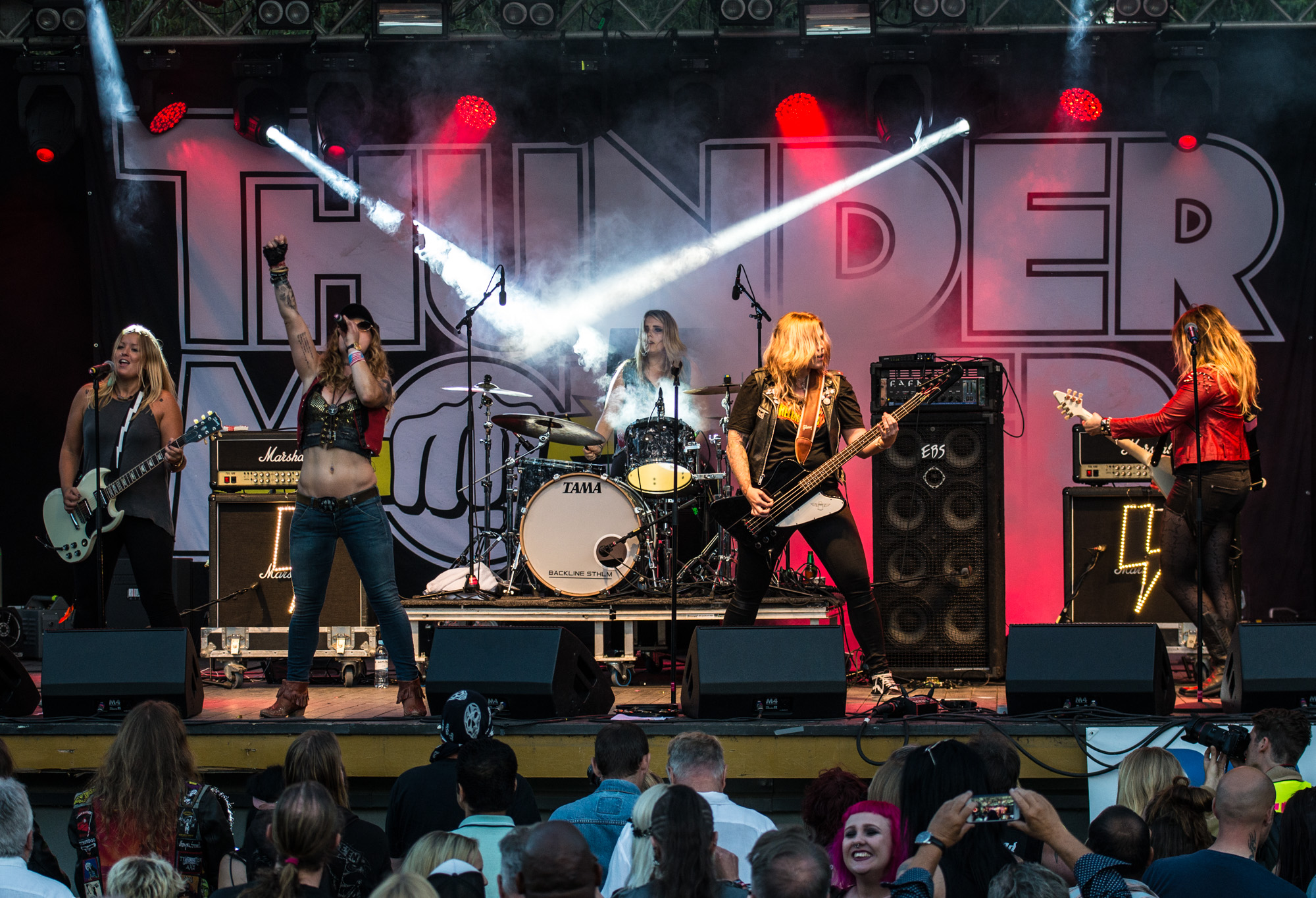
- Thundermother in Kungsträdgården 2016

Background information
- Origin: Växjö, Sweden
- Genre: Hard rock
- Years active: 2009–present
- Labels: Warner Music Sweden (2014), Despotz (2015–2019), AFM (2020–2025) Napalm Records (2025–present)
- Members: Filippa Nässil; Majsan Lindberg; Linnéa Vikström; Joan Massing
- Past members: Moa Munoz; Clare Cunningham; Giorgia Carteri; Linda Ström; Tilda Stenqvist; Sara Pettersson; Guernica Mancini; Emlee Johansson; Tomas Salonen; Nathalie Lejon; Mona Lindgren; Amanga Smångs; Evami Ringqvist; Rebecca Meiselbach; Sara Pettersson
- Website: thundermother.com

Thundermother is an all-female Swedish hard rock band founded by Filippa Nässil and Moa Munoz in Växjö 2009. The band has toured with Scorpions across Europe and North America, played with Kiss, Danish rock band D-A-D and Swedish rock band Backyard Babies. Thundermother has produced seven albums, the first album Rock'N'Roll Disaster came out in 2014 and the latest album Dirty and Divine was released February 2025.

== Formation ==
With the exception of the first lineup, Thundermother has consisted of all female musicians. The band has struggled with internal problems, including many defections from band members and internal cooperation difficulties.

The first line up in Växjö was Nathalie Lejon on vocals, Filippa Nässil on guitar, Moa Munoz on bass and Tomas Salonen on drums, their first show was in a youth center in Växjö in 2010 of April with the local band Wera as the support act.

The band had many different members in its early years, but from 2012 the band had a stable line-up. In March 2017, all band members except Filippa Nässil left the band. Nässil, who founded the band, chose to continue with a new line-up.

In February 2023, once again all band members except Filippa Nässil left the band. Again Nässil chose to continue the band with a new line-up.

One of Thundermother's co-founders, Moa Munoz, was the tour bass player for Olivia Rodrigo Guts World Tour.

== Tours ==
Thundermother has played at Sweden Rock Festival, Bråvalla Festivalen, Skogsröjet, Nova Rock Festival, Masters of Rock, Summer Breeze Open Air, Hard Rock Hell, Copenhell, Metaltown, Getaway Rock Festival and was the opening act for Kiss at the Kiss Kruise. They have also toured with D-A-D, Backyard Babies and Scorpions in Europe and North America.

Thundermother went on a new tour in 2025.

== Music ==
Thundermother's first two albums – Rock'N'Roll Disaster (2014) and Road Fever (2015) – were strongly influenced by AC/DC. The band's third album, Thundermother (2018), featured a new vocalist, Guernica Mancini.

In 2020, one week after the band released the album Heat Wave, the album was the sixth best-selling album in Germany, the eighth best-selling album in Sweden, and seventh on the Swedish hard rock top-list.

The album Black and Gold was released in 2022, followed by the latest album Dirty and Divine in 2025.

A live album, Live’n’Alive, will be released digitally on April 17, 2026 and physically July 10, 2026 via Napalm Records.

== Awards ==
In April 2021, Thundermother won the Gaffa Prize in the category Best Hard Rock/Metal Band of the Year.

== Current band members ==
- Filippa Nässil – guitar (2009–present)
- Linnéa Vikström – vocals (2023–present)
- Majsan Lindberg – bass (2019–2021, 2023–present)
- Joan Massing – drums (2023–present)

== Discography ==
=== Album ===
- 2014 – Rock n Roll Disaster
- 2015 – Road Fever
- 2018 – Thundermother
- 2020 – Heat Wave
- 2021 – Heat Wave (Deluxe Edition)
- 2022 – Black and Gold
- 2025 – Dirty and Divine
- 2026 – Live’n’Alive

=== Singles and EP ===
- 2015 – Deal with the Devil
- 2015 – It's Just a Tease
- 2015 – Rock 'n' Roll Sisterhood
- 2016 – Hellevator
- 2017 – We Fight for Rock N Roll
- 2017 – Whatever
- 2018 – Fire in the Rain
- 2018 – Revival
- 2020 – Driving in Style
- 2020 – Sleep
- 2021 – You Can't Handle Me
- 2022 – Watch Out
- 2022 – I Don't Know You
- 2022 – Hot Mess
- 2023 – I left My Licence in the Future
- 2024 – Speaking of the Devil
- 2024 – So Close
- 2024 – Dead or Alive
- 2025 – Bright Eyes
- 2025 – Can't Put Out the Fire
- 2026 - Bimbo Boost
