= Vavassori =

Vavassori is an Italian surname from Lombardy, literally meaning 'Vavasours'. Notable people with the surname include:

- Andrea Vavassori (born 1995), Italian tennis player
- Giovanni Vavassori (born 1952), Italian footballer and manager
- Giuseppe Vavassori (1934–1983), Italian footballer

== See also ==
- Valvassori
