= Ioannis Anastassakis =

- Origin: Greece
- Genre: Flamenco/ Rock fusion
- Instrument: Guitar
- Label: Wild Rose Angel Productions
- Website: https://www.ioannis.org

Ioannis Anastassakis is a Greek Flamenco and Rock guitarist, book author, and a music instructor at the American College of Greece.

== Early life and education ==
Anastassakis was born on the island of Crete. He began learning to play the guitar at age 12. He studied at the Philippos Nakas Conservatory in Athens and privately with Berklee College of Music alumnus, Stelios Karaminas. He graduated from the American College of Greece and subsequently studied at the Musicians Institute in Hollywood, California. He received a master's degree in guitar performance with specialization in flamenco under the tutelage of Juan Serrano from California State University, Fresno.

== Career ==
After graduation, Anastassakis taught guitar technique and began giving recitals and concerts in both Greece and the United States. In 2000, in collaboration with Nakas Conservatory, he founded the first Flamenco Guitar Department in Greece In 2006 Mel Bay Publication, published "Flamenco Journal", a book/DVD of his solo Flamenco guitar compositions.

In 2007 Anastassakis independently released his first Electric guitar album, Suspension Of Disbelief. The album consisted of both fast-paced flamenco style acoustic music and rock style electric guitar instrumental tracks.

In 2008 Anastassakis organized the first Greek Guitar Power Tour. This group of guitarists tours around Greece each year, presenting concerts, guitar classes, seminars, and organizing guitar contests. That same year his instruction book, The Art of Tremolo, was published by Mel Bay. This was followed by several more books on Flamenco and Electric Guitar.

In 2009 his second album of rock-fusion music Orbital Attempt, was released on the Wild Rose Angel Productions label. The album featured guest solos by Kiko Loureiro (Angra, Megadeth) and Brett Garsed, as well as the keyboard player Bob Katsionis. The instrumental tracks feature fast fingering and a variety of guitar techniques from flamenco to heavy metal rock riffs. Anastassakis was praised for his skill and technique, but criticized for squeezing in so many complex licks at the expense of musicality. The music is composed by Anastassakis.

Also in 2009, Anastassakis played a guest solo for the solo CD of Greek guitarist Kostas Vretos on his album Skin On Strings.

In early 2013, Ioannis produced the first CD of his online guitar coaching academy Elite Guitar Coaching, called "Elite Guitar Coaching Rising Stars, vol.1", with 13 original tracks, composed and recorded by his guitar students.

In 2014 Ioannis produced and released the first CD of Greek Guitar Power team, called Greek Guitar Power, Vol.1 with 12 original tracks composed by the members of the group.

== Discography ==
=== Solo Flamenco Guitar CDs ===
- Flamenco Live at Ioannina (2004)
- Flamenco Journal (2006)

=== Instrumental Electric Guitar CDs ===
- Suspension of Disbelief (2007)
- Orbital Attempt (2009)

=== with Elite Guitar Coaching ===
- Elite Guitar Coaching Rising Stars, Vol.1 (2013)

=== with Greek Guitar Power ===
- Greek Guitar Power, Vol.1 (2014)

=== Orbital Attempt - Track listing ===
1. "The Promised Land" – 5:46
2. "Astrochicken's Victorious Attack" – 5:37
3. "Weird Thing" – 7:21
4. "A Mi Madre (Soleares)" – 5:20
5. "Orbital Attempt" – 8:39
6. "Progressive Minds" – 11:24
7. "Veridiana (Rumba Flamenca)" – 4:04
8. "Abort Horizon" – 6:34
9. "The Greek Guitar Power Jam" – 8:29
10. "Guest Solos 2008" – 2:45
11. "The Greek Guitar Power Jam Backing Track" - 7:53

== Books and publications ==
- The Art of Rasgueado, Mel Bay Publications, 2004
- Guitar Journals: Flamenco, Mel Bay Publications, 2006
- MBGU Rock Guitar Masterclass Vol.1 - 60 Tapping Licks, Mel Bay Publications, 2007
- The Art of Tremolo, Mel Bay Publications, 2008
- MBGU Rock Guitar Masterclass Vol. 2 - 60 Sweeping Licks, Mel Bay Publications, 2010
