= Roney "Giah" Giacometti =

Brazilian filmmaker, composer and music producer

Roney Giah
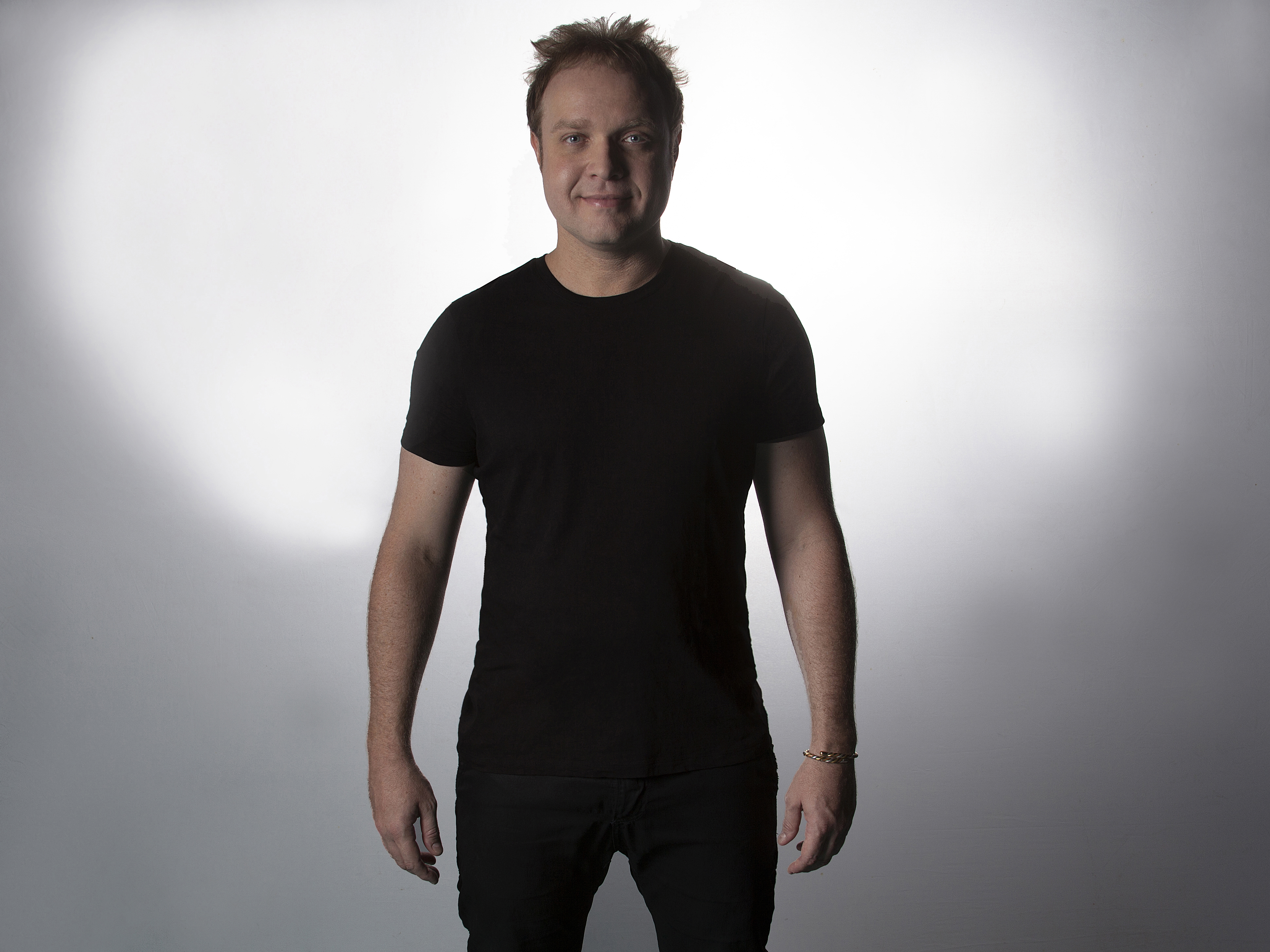
- Roney Giah

Background information
- Born: Roney "Giah" Giacometti; 11 August 1974 (age 52); São José dos Campos, São Paulo, Brazil
- Origin: São Paulo, Brazil
- Genres: Brazilian music, pop, jazz fusion
- Occupations: Singer-songwriter, guitarist, music producer, filmmaker, commercial director
- Instruments: Vocals, electric guitar, acoustic guitar
- Years active: 1988–present
- Website: roneygiah.com.br

Roney Giah (born 11 August 1974) is a Brazilian filmmaker, commercial director, composer, guitarist and music producer. He is the founder of DOIDDO Studio, a multidisciplinary creative studio specializing in advertising films, animation, artificial intelligence, games and digital experiences.

== Biography ==
Giah was born in São José dos Campos, in the state of São Paulo, and moved to the city of São Paulo during childhood. He began studying music at the age of six. In Brazil, he studied harmony and arrangement with Claudio Leal Ferreira, piano at the Centro Livre de Aprendizagem Musical (CLAM), founded by the Zimbo Trio, singing with Paulo Brito, Robson Nascimento and Isabêh, and guitar with Mané dos Santos, Rafael Bittencourt, Tomati, Pollaco and Sandro Haick. During his teenage years, he played in the bands Moscou Capitalista and Quelidon.

From 1993 to 1994, Giah studied at the Musicians Institute in Los Angeles, returning to Brazil in 1994. During this period, he studied with musicians including Pat Metheny, Scott Henderson, Frank Gambale, Joe Diorio, Joe Pass, Norman Brown, Stanley Jordan, Jennifer Batten and Cat Gray.

After returning to Brazil, Giah recorded his debut album, Semente, in 1996. It was released in 1997 and was nominated for the 1998 Sharp Award. In the same year, he was a finalist in the instrumental edition of the Visa Award and placed second at the Berklee/Souza Lima Festival in São Paulo. His composition “Argila”, from Semente, was also included on the Brazilian-artist compilation Pearl Brazilian Team 3.

In 2003, Giah graduated in sound engineering from the Instituto de Áudio e Vídeo (IAV) in São Paulo. He held a preliminary release of his second album, Mais Dias na Terra, in 2005. The album was officially launched in 2006 with a performance at the São Paulo Museum of Image and Sound. It was pre-selected for both the 2006 TIM Music Award and the 2006 Latin Grammy Awards.

In 2007, Giah was selected by the Brazilian mobile operator Oi to participate in its Oi Novo Som project. His song “Lembra?” was among the ten most-played songs in the project's Recife edition.

In 2008, Giah's composition “Translate the World” was featured on the soundtrack of the American film No Pain, No Gain. That year, he signed with British label Astranova Records for the release of the compilation Yesterday’s Tomorrow. The album combined material from Semente and Mais Dias na Terra with tracks produced for the compilation. Astranova promoted it through podcast programmes distributed in 107 countries. The deal followed the selection of “Amar com E” and “A Chuva” as Track of the Day on the music website GarageBand.

Also in 2008, “Amar com E” received an honorable mention in the World category of the John Lennon Songwriting Contest. Giah was the only Brazilian artist recognised in that edition.

In 2009, “Time Is So Still” received an honorable mention in the 16th annual Billboard World Song Contest. During the same period, Giah joined the catalogue of the American music-licensing company Jingle Punks, which supplied independent music for film, television and digital productions.

In 2010, “Time Is So Still” received another honorable mention, this time from Mike Pinder’s Songwars, a competition created by Mike Pinder, a founding member of The Moody Blues. Giah was also nominated in the International Artist category of Australia's Musicoz Awards for “Amar com E” and “Time Is So Still”. His album Queimando a Moleira was released that year.

In 2011, Giah and the Perseptom Vocal Band released the a cappella album Co'as Goela e Tudo. The album tied for runner-up in the Best Folk/World Album category of the Contemporary A Cappella Recording Awards.

During the same period, “Time Is So Still” and “Isto” entered the playlists of more than 150 American college radio stations and twice reached the Top 30 at individual stations.

In 2012, Giah released Pop em Pedaço Vol. 01 and Single Puzzle Piece Vol. 01 on CD and seven-inch vinyl. “Talentless Lover”, included on Single Puzzle Piece Vol. 01, received Suggested Artist Honors in the Song of the Year competition. In 2014, he released Pop em Pedaço Vol. 02, featuring Jorge Mautner on “O Vermelho da Sua Boca”.

Alongside his recording career, Giah worked as an audio producer and composer for advertising. In 2014, he founded Doiddo Films, initially focusing on directing advertising films and animation. As its activities expanded into artificial intelligence, games, branding and digital experiences, the company broadened its creative services through DOIDDO Studio, establishing a multidisciplinary creative operation.

In 2016, “Parkinsounds”, a project directed by Giah, received a Gold Lion and a Silver Lion at the Cannes Lions International Festival of Creativity, as well as two Gold and one Silver Clio Awards. In 2017, Giah received another Silver Lion at Cannes in the Entertainment for Music category. In 2019, he received his fourth Cannes Lion, a Gold Lion.

In 2018, the animated series Escolinha dos Deuses, created by Doiddo Films, won a project selection held by the Fox Group and entered development under Giah's direction. The production was intended for Nat Geo Kids.

In 2021, Giah's short film Gael: Seu Motorista Está a Caminho, starring Felipe Camargo and Luiz Carlos Vasconcelos, was selected for the Primeiros Quadros programme of the Rio de Janeiro International Short Film Festival, Curta Cinema. Giah also received a Best Director nomination for the film.

In 2022, Giah announced an agreement with the American production company Buffalo 8 to direct Lost Coyote, a feature film written by Gustavo Freitas and then in development.

== Discography ==
=== Albums and compilations ===
- Semente (1997)
- Mais Dias na Terra (2006; preliminary release in 2005)
- Yesterday’s Tomorrow (2008)
- Queimando a Moleira (2010)
- Co'as Goela e Tudo, with Perseptom Vocal Band (2011)
- Pop em Pedaço Vol. 01 (2012)
- Single Puzzle Piece Vol. 01 (2012)
- Pop em Pedaço Vol. 02 (2014)

=== Video ===
- Uma Tarde Onde Nasci — DVD (2006)

== Awards and nominations ==
=== Music ===
- 1998 — Sharp Award nomination for Semente.
- 1998 — Finalist in the instrumental edition of the Visa Award.
- 1998 — Runner-up at the Berklee/Souza Lima Festival.
- 2006 — Pre-selected for the TIM Music Award for Mais Dias na Terra.
- 2006 — Pre-selected for the Latin Grammy Awards for Mais Dias na Terra.
- 2008 — Honorable mention in the World category of the John Lennon Songwriting Contest for “Amar com E”.
- 2009 — Honorable mention in the 16th Billboard World Song Contest for “Time Is So Still”.
- 2010 — Honorable mention in Mike Pinder’s Songwars for “Time Is So Still”.
- 2010 — International Artist nomination at the Musicoz Awards.
- 2011 — Tied runner-up for Best Folk/World Album at the Contemporary A Cappella Recording Awards for Co'as Goela e Tudo.
- 2011 — Runner-up for Favorite Central/South American A Cappella Group at the A Cappella Community Awards.
- 2011 — Album of the Year at the Caiubi Awards for Co'as Goela e Tudo.
- 2012 — Suggested Artist Honors in the Song of the Year competition for “Talentless Lover”.

=== Film and advertising ===
- 2016 — Gold Lion at the Cannes Lions International Festival of Creativity for “Parkinsounds”.
- 2016 — Silver Lion at Cannes Lions for “Parkinsounds”.
- 2016 — Two Gold and one Silver Clio Awards for “Parkinsounds”.
- 2017 — Silver Lion at Cannes Lions in the Entertainment for Music category.
- 2019 — Gold Lion at Cannes Lions.
- 2021 — Best Director nomination at the Rio de Janeiro International Short Film Festival for Gael: Seu Motorista Está a Caminho.
