= Phillip Michael Pacetti =

Phillip Pacetti
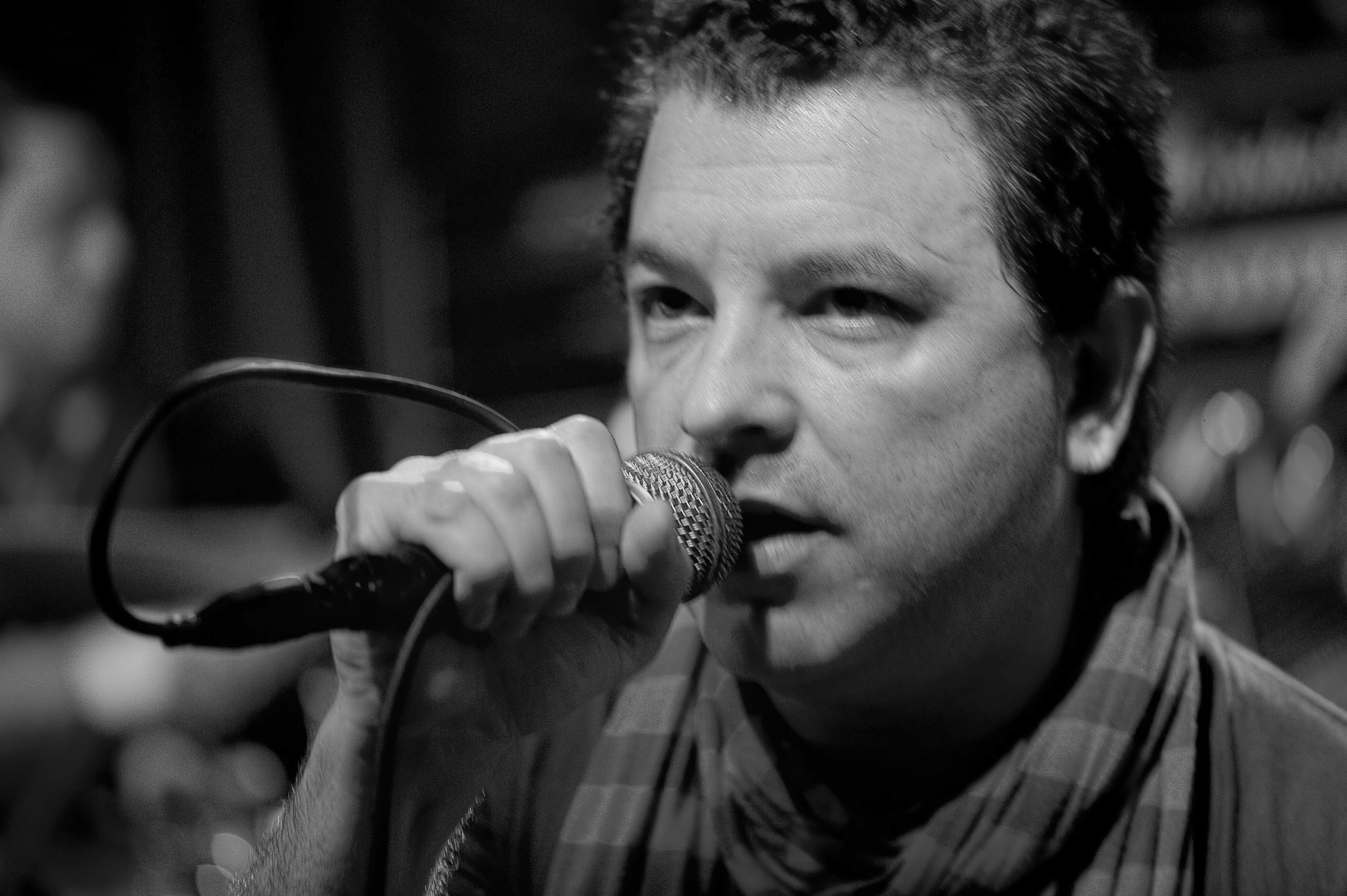
- Phillip Pacetti

Background information
- Genres: Psychedelic, Indie Rock, Neo-Psychedelic, Dream-Pop
- Occupations: Vocalist, Musician, songwriter, producer
- Instrument: Vocals, guitar
- Years active: 1990–present
- Labels: Poisoned Apple Recordings; Eleanore Recordings; Core Records

Phillip Pacetti known as "Philonious" is an American musician active since the 1990s

"Philonious" is a vocalist, guitarist, lyricist, songwriter and music producer who began his musical journey in the early 1990s with the Los Angeles band Grumblefish. The band was produced by Jonathan Melvoin (drummer for The Dickies, and Prince and The Revolution) Jonathan was the drummer on their debut album and performed at local shows with the band in Los Angeles for one year before recruiting Mark Aber Rooney, the son of Mickey Rooney and Jan Rooney. Grumblefish was a staple of the LA music scene and released three albums before disbanding in 1996. Philonious studied voice at Musician's Institute in Los Angeles, CA, and was cited by friends and fellow musicians for his extensive vocal range. He fronted the band Self Destructing Messengers which disbanded after their last performance in August 2010.

In 2018, he co-founded the band upper cases with local guitarist and songwriter Eddie Moroney in Raleigh, North Carolina. The current lineup also includes John Luton on drums, Josh Colton on keyboards, and Daniel Gardner on bass. The group has been performing regional shows in the area. Since 2022, they have been recording and releasing music through their label, BuzzColonyRecordings.
