= Howard R. Paul =

President and CEO of Benedetto Guitars

- Born: Howard R. Paul; November 15, 1960 (age 65); Petersburg, Virginia
- Citizenship: United States of America
- Education: University of North Carolina
- Occupations: Musician; CEO; Educator
- Organization(s): Benedetto Guitars, Incorporated
- Known for: Musician
- Military career
- Allegiance: United States
- Service years: 1987 - 1997
- Website: www.howardpaul.com

Howard R. Paul (born November 15, 1960, in Petersburg, Virginia) is president and CEO of Benedetto Guitars, a company he founded with American luthier Robert Benedetto in June 2006 after Benedetto's departure from a seven-year licensing agreement with Fender. Benedetto Guitars was begun in 1968 and is a boutique American archtop guitar manufacturer which builds hand-carved instruments.

== Education and military service ==
Paul joined Benedetto after a ten-year career as a U.S. Army logistics officer and ten years as an executive with Chatham Steel. He holds a degree in Political Science from the University of North Carolina at Greensboro and was commissioned as a lieutenant after completing Infantry Officer Candidate School in January 1987 and the U.S. Army Transportation School. He served tours of Desert Storm assigned to 3rd Army HQ and Somalia attached to the 10th Mountain Division.

== Musical background ==
Paul's musical background began at age four in Northfield, New Jersey with his first guitar. He began playing jazz at age ten and worked professionally beginning at age thirteen in Atlantic City, New Jersey. He has worked with Bob James, George Mesterhazy, Tony Monaco, Bucky Pizzarelli, Howard Alden, Jack Wilkins, Joe Beck, Andreas Oberg, Jimmy Bruno, Joe Negri, Gene Bertoncini, and Frank Vignola. He has performed at the Savannah Jazz Festival and Savannah Music Festival, Smithsonian Jazz Cafe, Napa Valley Opera House, The Jazz Standard, The Jazz Corner, The Jazz Kitchen, Kuumbwa Jazz Center, Yoshi's, The Blue Wisp, Silo Jazz, and Shanghai Jazz. His albums include Tony Monaco & Howard Paul: New Adventures (2014), Bob James & Howard Paul, Just Friends: The Hamilton Hall Sessions (2011), and Ali Ryerson Trio, Jamin' at the Jazz Corner (2008). He has recorded with Claire Frazier, bassist Ben Tucker, Bob Mastellar's Jazz Corner Allstars, singer Bobby Ryder, and guitarist Jerry Sims. He was inducted into the Savannah Coastal Jazz Hall of Fame / Savannah Jazz Festival in 2011.
