= Filippa Nässil =

Swedish songwriter, guitarist, vocalist, and producer (born 1986)

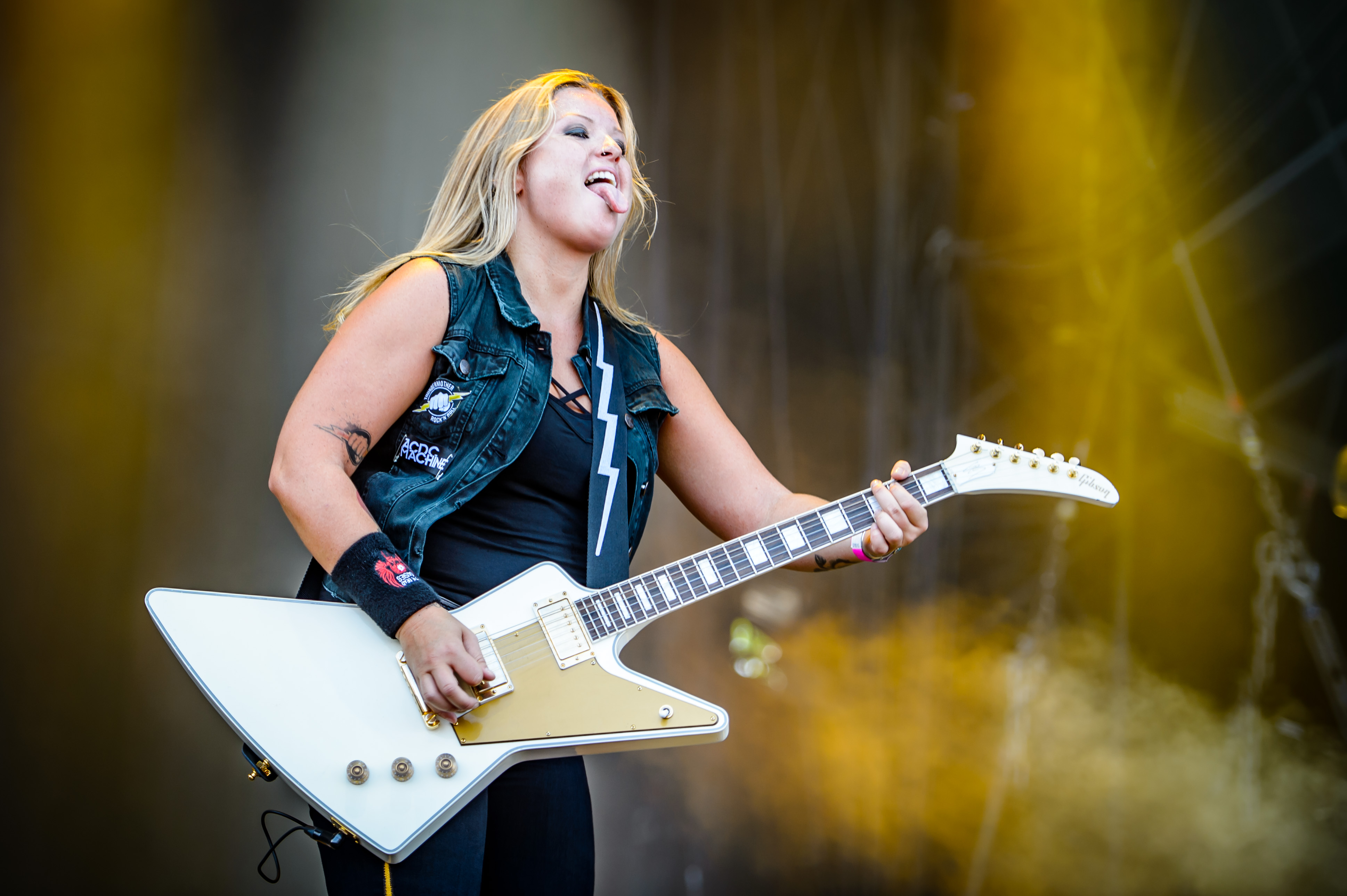
- Filippa Nässil at Wacken Open Air 2018

Background information
- Born: 8 September 1986 (age 39); Tryde in Skåne county, Sweden
- Genres: Heavy metal; hard rock; blues rock; rock music
- Occupations: Guitarist, Songwriter, Vocalist, Producer, Manager
- Instrument: Guitar, Vocalist
- Years active: 2009–present
- Labels: AFM Records, Despotz Records, Rasberry Rocks
- Member of: Thundermother, Filippa Nässil

Filippa Nässil (born 9 August 1986) is a Swedish musician, songwriter, guitarist, vocalist, producer and bandleader best known for being the guitarist in and founder of the Swedish hard rock band Thundermother and for having toured with Scorpions across Europe and North America. Nässil has also toured with Kiss, Danish rock band D-A-D and Swedish rock band Backyard Babies.

== Career ==
=== 2009–2023 ===
Nässil started to play electric guitar when she was 12 years old. She became very influenced by bands like AC/DC and Kiss. Nässil later started the band Thundermother in a basement in Växjö, Sweden, in 2009.

She moved to Stockholm to focus on her music career. There, she started another band called HIFLY. In 2015, HIFLY released two singles and the album Stop Messing Around. In 2014-2015, Nässil's band Thundermother released two albums, Rock N'Roll Disaster and Road Fever.

In 2016, Nässil launched her design of jewellery for rockers.

In 2017, four of the total five members of her band Thundermother announced that they were leaving Nässil's band. Nässil signed new members, and between 2018 and 2023 her band released four new albums. She has played and toured with her band Thundermother at Sweden Rock Festival, Bråvalla festival, Skogsröjet, Nova Rock Festival, Masters of Rock, Summer Breeze Open Air, Hard Rock Hell, Copenhell, Metaltown, and Getaway Rock Festival, and the band was the opening act for Kiss at the Kiss Kruise. Thundermother has also toured with D-A-D, Backyard Babies and Scorpions across Europe and North America.

=== 2023–present ===
In 2023, the band members of Thundermother left, and once again Nässil signed new members. 2025 the new album Dirty and Divine by Thundermother was released. Nässil went on a new European tour with her band in 2025.

In 2024, Nässil released the solo album American Diaries.

== Personal life ==
In 2024, Nässil gave birth to her first child together with her partner Pontus Snibb (Bonafide).

== Discography ==
=== Album from Hifly ===
- 2015 – Stop Messing Around

=== Albums from Thundermother ===
- 2014 – Rock N Roll Disaster
- 2015 – Road Fever
- 2018 – Thundermother
- 2020 – Heat Wave
- 2021 – Heat Wave (Deluxe Edition)
- 2022 – Black and Gold
- 2025 – Dirty and Divine

=== Album from Filippa Nässil ===
- 2024 – American Diaries
