= Taps Mugadza =

- Born: 1 April 1988 (age 36)
- Origin: Harare, Zimbabwe
- Genres: Pop
- Instrument(s): Vocals, piano, guitar
- Years active: 2009–present

Tapiwa "Taps" Mugadza, known professionally as Taps Mugadza or just Taps, is a Zimbabwean soul and pop singer.

== Personal life ==
Taps Mugadza was born in Harare, Zimbabwe and was found abandoned on the doorstep of an orphanage when he was two days old.

== Career ==
He began singing and playing music when he was 15. He sang at church and he competed in the Zimbabwean Idol competition and placed third overall.

Taps volunteered for the Christian mission organization, Rock of Africa, traveling with them in outreach programs and to dig wells in impoverished areas. The mission supported him on a trip to America in 2009 to find sponsors to secure his future in music. In May 2009, Taps was accepted as a student at the Musicians Institute in Hollywood. He graduated with the school's highest honor, 'Outstanding Artist' and both the head of his program and the president of the school said they had never had anyone as talented at Taps.

In 2014 he was a guest on the TV series TakePart Live. He also performed live on the TV series EXTRA that same year.

Taps writes and performs his own music and has worked with producers such as T-Collar, Moose, Pip Kembo, Boi-1da, and Quincy Jones.

Taps cover of Adele's "Hello" got Billboard recognition for one of the best 11 soul stirring covers, on the list. Other notable covers include "Make You Feel My Love" (Adele), "Jealous" (Labrinth), "Hallelujah" (Leonard Cohen), "You Are the Reason" (Calum Scott) and "Someone You Loved" (Lewis Capaldi) amongst many.

His song "Sober" was used in episode 9 of season 14 of the American TV series Criminal Minds in the episode entitled "Broken Wing".

== Discography ==
=== Singles ===
- 2015: "What Have I Done"
- 2016: "Wanna Hear Your Voice"
- 2017: "Invincible"
- 2017: "Waiting for You"
- 2018: "Sober"
