= Shane Alexander (musician) =

American singer-songwriter

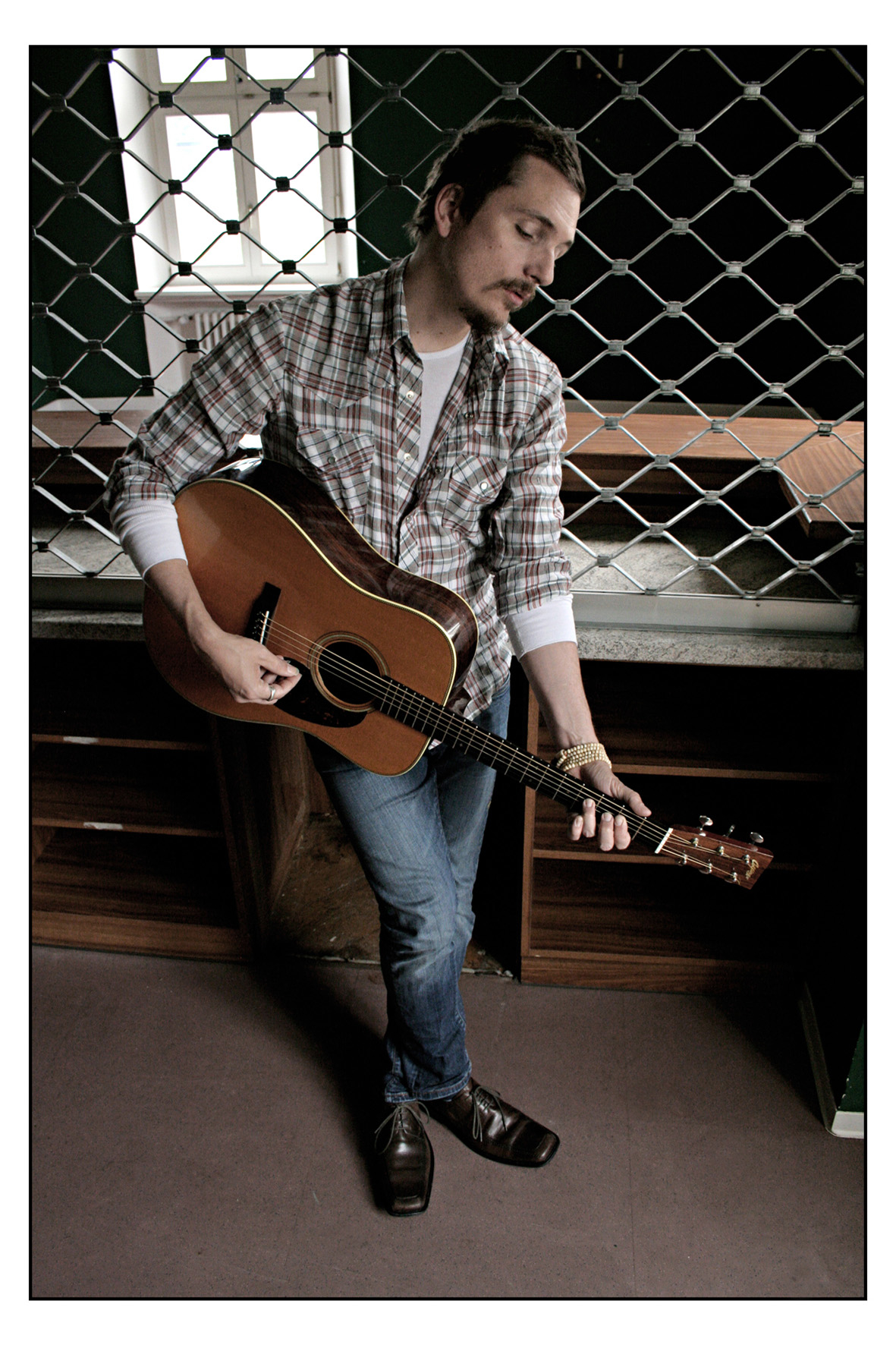

Background information
- Born: San Diego, California, United States
- Occupations: Singer-songwriter, performer, record producer
- Instruments: Guitar, vocals, keyboard, mandolin, banjo
- Website: www.shanealexandermusic.com

Shane Alexander is a contemporary American singer-songwriter and musician. Alexander was born in San Diego, California, raised in Pennsylvania and Maryland, and is currently residing in Southern California.

Alexander's songs range from dark and stirring to subtle and romantic, and are centered on evocative vocals and complex, soulful guitar playing. His smooth vocal style has drawn comparisons to singers Jeff Buckley, Jackson Browne and Art Garfunkel.

Dozens of his songs have appeared on television shows, including The Real World, Laguna Beach, Brothers & Sisters, Bones, Big Shots, White Collar, Criminal Minds, Catfish: The TV Show, and Wildfire.

He attended Indiana University of Pennsylvania and Musician's Institute in Hollywood, California.

== Early life and musical influences ==
Shane Alexander was 5 years old when he first heard Black Sabbath’s Iron Man. Hearing the song jolted the young Alexander's music consciousness.

Escaping a tumultuous time at home, Alexander often sought refuge at his grandmother's house, listening to a large collection of vinyl LPs that had belonged to his father. Artists such as Cat Stevens, Harry Chapin, the Beatles, Simon and Garfunkel, and The Moody Blues shaped the impressionable young Alexander's musical tastes. Simon and Garfunkel's Greatest Hits album particularly moved him, but it was the music of Neil Young whom he cites today as his biggest influence.

At 10 years old, Alexander received his first guitar from his grandmother. Alexander soon taught himself to play guitar and by 12 years old, had joined his first band. Countless followed throughout his teen years.

== Career ==
=== The early 1990s ===
Shane Alexander moved from his hometown in Butler, Pennsylvania to Los Angeles in the early 1990s. During those early years in California, he attended Musician's Institute in Hollywood and played guitar with the psychedelic instrumental band Trippin, led by virtuoso keyboardist and composer, Jim Michaelson. The band's spectacular live shows drew record crowds in Los Angeles. In 1994, legendary producer Richard Podolor (Alice Cooper, Steppenwolf, Iron Butterfly, Three Dog Night) spotted the band at Coconut Teaszer and invited Alexander to lend his emotive guitar playing to a project he was producing called Young Art. While working with Podolor, Alexander learned invaluable lessons about songwriting and arranging. Later joining the rock band Young Art, he performed as a guitarist and back-up singer. It was not long before Alexander began writing songs for the band as well. Alexander recorded two albums with the group, one produced by Podolor and the other produced by Richie Zito (Cheap Trick, Joe Cocker, Berlin).

In 1997, Alexander formed and fronted Damone with friends from Pennsylvania. The band toured the West Coast club circuit and enjoyed a steadily growing base of loyal fans. They were featured in an interview and fashion layout for Los Angeles Times magazine, and their song "She Likes the Ocean" was used on the extreme sports show Blue Torch, exposing the band to new fans all over the world. The band released a self-titled album and a four-song EP before disbanding in 2002. Just as they were splitting up, the band sold their name for a hefty sum to Damone, a new rock group on RCA records.

Around this time Alexander also began working at Irving Azoff's label Giant Records in the Finance Department. The following year he joined Azoff's executive office as an assistant and runner to the artists – a position that would get the aspiring songwriter up close and personal with The Eagles, Christina Aguilera, Seal, Jewel, Eddie Van Halen, Brian Wilson, Bush, and many other top acts.

=== 2003–2004: start of a solo career ===
In early 2003, Alexander began a busy schedule of writing and performing solo shows, sometimes performing with a revolving band on bass, drums, mandolin, piano, accordion, and lap steel.

Alexander produced and recorded a self-titled EP that was released in late 2003. The four song disc, described as a collection of "stripped down acoustic songs with vivid lyrics and haunting melodies," included the track "Last Day on Earth," which was later covered by 1980s New Wave band Berlin. Shane Alexander toured extensively on both coasts in 2004, beginning to bring his music to a wider audience.

=== 2004–2005: The Middle Way ===
In January 2005, Alexander released his debut full-length album The Middle Way, a collection of "rootsy, folk rock with intimate vocals and a rich instrumental backdrop." The album was critically acclaimed, particularly in Europe.

"The Open Road," the lead single from The Middle Way, received national airplay on numerous stations across the Netherlands, and Alexander signed with the Dutch label Lucky Dice Records. Beginning to tour internationally, Alexander performed at clubs and theaters in Canada, UK, Netherlands, Germany, Belgium, France, Austria, Sweden, and Denmark and across the United States. Alexander subsequently opened two US tours for Jewel and a west coast/Canada tour with Lisa Marie Presley in 2005.

=== 2006–2007: Stargazer ===
In 2006, Alexander released his second full-length album, Stargazer on his own imprint BuddhaLand Records. The album was produced by Heroes & Villains (Billy Mohler and Dan Burns) and featured some of Los Angeles’ most respected musicians: Charlie Paxon (James Blunt, Colin Hay, Anastacia) on drums; Billy Mohler (Macy Gray, Liz Phair, Herbie Hancock) on bass; Krister Axel on piano; Chris Pierce on harmonica; and veteran session ace Kim Bullard (Tori Amos, Goo Goo Dolls, David Crosby, Eddie Money) on Hammond organ. The album was recorded in only four days and tracked mostly live using vintage gear, giving the album a rich, timeless sound. The album was called "stunning" by Performing Songwriter Magazine. Several songs from Stargazer were licensed for television and film. More international touring followed.

=== 2008–2009: Sky Below ===
In late 2007, Alexander once again teamed up with Heroes & Villains to produce his third full-length album. Many musicians returned from Stargazer – drummer Charlie Paxon, Billy Mohler on electric guitar, piano, keyboards and bass, and Kim Bullard on Hammond organ, with additional performances from Chad Crawford (bass) and Jeff Friedl (drums). Toby Wright (Alice in Chains, Wallflowers, Chris Whitley, Trey Anastasio) mixed the record. Alexander sought to get back to a band sound on this album and added more up-tempo songs than in his previous effort. The album was released on BuddaLand Records in February 2008. Alexander supported the album with extensive touring in The United States and Europe and later that year, opened Seal's U.S. tour. Alone in front of the biggest audiences of his career, Alexander captivated audiences night after night.

Several songs from The Sky Below were licensed for television and film.

=== 2010–2011: Mono Solo ===
On June 1, 2010, Alexander released Mono Solo, his fourth full-length album. Billy Mohler, who co-produced Stargazer and The Sky Below, produced the album. The new collection marked a quantum leap, both in songwriting and in production, for Alexander. Inspired by stories picked up while touring the U.S. and Europe, the effect of the economic crisis on those around him, and the tragic death of a lifelong friend, each track on Mono Solo conveys a sense of reverence for life, love, and stability. "Corey's Song" is Alexander's farewell ode to Corey James Daum, who was killed in a drunk driving crash in Nashville. The album is dedicated to his friend.

The track "Carrollton" was licensed for the television show One Tree Hill on the WB Network before the album was even released.

In late 2010 Alexander signed with Warner Chappell Europe and Rough Trade Records Benelux. The album was released internationally in Spring 2011 and the single "Good as Gold" reached 126 on the Dutch pop chart. Alexander has been touring constantly across the United States and internationally in support of the album. In 2011, Shane Alexander opened for Styx and Yes in 22 cities during their cross-country Summer Tour.

=== 2012: The Greater Good ===
In spring of 2012, The Greater Good released their self-titled debut on the German label, Stockfisch Records. Recorded in Northeim, Germany the previous spring, the record features Alexander, NYC songwriter Eugene Ruffolo, and Dutch songwriter Dennis Kolen. The album, recorded in less than a week, has a stripped folk-pop sound with lush three-part vocal harmonies. The success of the first single, "All the Lonely Times" (Kolen) and second single, "Nowhere Fast" (Alexander/Silver) in the Netherlands led to the band's first Dutch tour in the fall of 2012.

=== 2013: Ladera ===
In April 2013, Alexander released his 5th album, Ladera. The production of the new album is far more sparse and ambient than his previous work, and pays tribute to many of Alexander's more psychedelic influences. Teaming up for the 4th time with producer Billy Mohler, and recorded at Mohler's Groundswell Studios in Culver City, CA, the latest collection also showcases Peter Adams (Five For Fighting, Josh Groban, Rickie Lee Jones) on keyboards and newcomer, Jesse Siebenberg (Supertramp, A Fine Frenzy, Lissie) on lapsteel. In spring of 2013, Alexander signed with Dutch label Harlem Recordings, a division of Suburban Records.

=== 2016: Bliss ===
In July 2016, Alexander released his 6th album, Bliss. The self-produced album was recorded in his own Buddhaland studio in Ventura County, CA.

=== 2019: A Life Like Ours ===
In September 2019, Shane released his 7th album, A Life Like Ours.

=== 2025: Forever Songs ===
In April 2025, Shane released his 8th album, Forever Songs.

== Discography ==
Album	Release Date
Damone	2000
Shane Alexander EP	2004
The Middle Way	2005
Stargazer	2006
The Sky Below	2008
Mono Solo	2010
Ladera	2013
Bliss	2016
A Life Like Ours	2019
Forever Songs	2025

== Song appearances ==
=== Television ===
ABC	Episode	Song	Album
Brothers & Sisters	Love Is Difficult	"Ripe"	Stargazer
Samantha Who	Episode	"Spaces in Between"	Stargazer
Big Shots	Episode	"Difference of Opinion"	The Sky Below
What About Brian?	Episode	"Ripe"	Stargazer
ABC Family	Episode	Song	Album
Wildfire	Goodbye	"Ripe"	Stargazer
Wildfire	Heartless	"Little Woman"	Stargazer
Wildfire	Episode	"One Track Mind"	The Middle Way
The Secret Life of the American Teenager	Three Moons Over Milford	"Spaces in Between"	Stargazer
CBS	Episode	Song	Album
Criminal Minds	DVD	"Living Out Loud"	The Middle Way
FOX	Episode	Song	Album
Bones	Spaceman in a Crater	"Shipwrecked"	Stargazer
USA	Episode	Song	Album
White Collar	All In	"Feels Like The End"	The Sky Below
MTV	Episode	Song	Album
The Real World	4 Episodes	"Saving Grace"	The Sky Below
Road Rules	Camped Out	"Difference of Opinion"	The Sky Below
Road Rules	Camped Out	"Feels Like the End"	The Sky Below
True Life	I Am Looking for My Child	"Outside the Lines"	The Sky Below
True Life	I Am Looking for My Child	"Ripe"	Stargazer
True Life	I Am Looking for My Child	"Spaces in Between"	Stargazer
True Life	I Am Looking for My Child	"Feels Like the End"	The Sky Below
Laguna Beach – The Real OC	Episode	"Ride the Tides"	Stargazer
My Life as Liz	Episode 104	"The Sky Below"	The Sky Below
Degrassi/The Next Generation	Holiday Road	"The Sky Below"	The Sky Below
Life On Tour	Web Series		
Teen Cribs	Episode 238	"Difference of Opinion"	The Sky Below
VH1	Episode	Song	Album
Basketball Wives	Episode	"Feels Like the End"	The Sky Below
WB	Episode	Song	Album
One Tree Hill	Last Day of Our Acquaintance	"Carrollton"	Mono Solo
One Tree Hill	Episode	"Feels Like The End"	The Sky Below
FX	Episode	Song	Album
Damages	You Got Your Prom Date Pregnant	"The Sky Below"	The Sky Below
DISCOVERY CHANNEL	Episode	Song	Album
Deadliest Catch	Season 10 Episode 16	"Keep You in Mind"	Mono Solo
DISCOVERY HEALTH	Episode	Song	Album
Dr. G Medical Examiner	Episode	"Feels Like the End"	The Sky Below
LIFETIME	Episode	Song	Album
What if God Were the Sun	Movie of the Week	"Shipwrecked"	Stargazer
NICKELODEON'S THE N	Episode	Song	Album
The Best Years	Dangerous Liaisons	"The Sky Below"	The Sky Below
What Goes On	Episode	"Where Were You"	Stargazer
SOAPS (the Netherlands)	Episode	Song	Album
Goede Tijden Slechte Tijden	Episodes	"Mina"	Shane Alexander EP

=== Film ===
Film	Starring	Song	Album
Jack and Jill vs. the World	Freddie Prinze Jr and Taryn Manning	"The Open Road"	The Middle Way
The House That Jack Built	Joe Montegna	"Feels like The End"	The Sky Below
The Ones	Kate Atkinson	"Front Porch Serenade"	Stargazer

=== Advertising ===
Eddie Bauer	Alpine Audio (Web)	Chevrolet
"Afterwhile"	"The Open Road"	"Everything As One"
"Keep You in Mind"		
"Feels Like the End"		
"Ride the Tides"		
"Miles for Days"		
