= Guernica Mancini =

Swedish singer

- Born: January 26, 1987 (age 38); Sweden
- Genres: Hard rock
- Years active: 2001-present
- Labels: Napalm Records
- Member of: The Gems
- Formerly of: Thundermother
- Website: www.guernicamancini.com

Guernica Mancini (born January 26, 1987) is a Swedish musician. She is the lead vocalist of the hard rock group The Gems.

Mancini was formerly the lead vocalist of the rock group Thundermother, having parted ways with the band in early February 2023.

== Biography ==
Mancini was 14 years old when she formed the all-female band "Banda Sept" which performed live all over Sweden.

In 2007, Mancini enrolled at the Musicians Institute in Los Angeles where she won a songwriting contest which led her to record with Black Eyed Peas music producer Darryl Swann. After leaving Musicians Institute, she formed the all-female band "Inglourious", performing at music venues around the United States such as House of Blues, Hard Rock Cafe, The Key and The Roxy.

Mancini teamed up with Jeff Young of Megadeth as the lead singer for his band "Souls on 11", going on tour and releasing a live performance DVD.

In 2023, Mancini and ex-Thundermother members Emlee Johansson and Mona Lindgren formed the rock band The Gems.
