= Don Mock =

American musician (1950–2025)

Background information
- Born: December 22, 1950; Port Angeles, Washington, United States
- Died: April 14, 2025 (aged 74) Seattle, Washington, United States
- Genres: Jazz, jazz-rock, fusion, blues
- Occupations: Guitarist, music educator, author, video producer
- Instrument: Guitar
- Years active: 1972–2025

Don Mock (December 22, 1950 – April 14, 2025) was an American jazz and fusion guitarist and music educator. He was one of the three guitar instructors with whom the Guitar Institute of Technology (GIT) — later part of the Musicians Institute — opened in Hollywood in March 1977, alongside Joe Diorio and Ron Escheté. He wrote instructional books for REH Publications and Alfred Music, and directed and produced instructional guitar videos for GIT and for REH's video line. Outside of music, Mock restored hydroplanes and served on the board of the Hydroplane and Raceboat Museum in Kent, Washington.

== Early life and Seattle career ==
Mock was born in Port Angeles, Washington, and attended West Seattle High School, where he was a schoolmate of drummer Dave Coleman Jr. The two played together in the blues-rock band Fiddler, which performed around Seattle until 1973. Mock has cited Mike Bloomfield, Jimi Hendrix and Eric Clapton among his early influences.

Turning toward jazz in the 1970s, Mock performed with bassist Gary Peacock, who was playing piano during that period, and with the Third stream group Matrix. He began teaching in 1972 at the Cornish School of the Allied Arts and at Olympic Junior College, both in Washington State.

Mock met Howard Roberts in the early 1970s after travelling to San Francisco to attend one of Roberts's guitar seminars, and subsequently organized seminars on Roberts's behalf in the Pacific Northwest.

== Guitar Institute of Technology ==
The Guitar Institute of Technology (GIT) opened in Hollywood on March 7, 1977, founded by the music entrepreneur Pat Hicks with a curriculum developed by Howard Roberts. Announcing the opening, Billboard reported that the faculty would include the guitarists Joe Diorio, Ron Escheté and Don Mock. The school opened to 57 students and three faculty members. In a 1991 Los Angeles Times profile of Escheté, the three were described as the guitar teachers with whom the school began. The Musicians Institute has likewise described Diorio, Escheté and Mock as its three original instructors.

Mock taught full-time at GIT until 1983, after which he continued part-time for about ten years, commuting between Seattle and Los Angeles. He contributed to the development of the school's guitar curriculum and also conducted seminars promoting GIT in the United States and Europe.

Among the guitarists who studied at GIT during Mock's years there were Scott Henderson, Frank Gambale, Paul Gilbert, Keith Wyatt and Allen Hinds. A 2016 Premier Guitar interview with Gilbert described Diorio, Mock and Henderson as the school's principal jazz and fusion instructors during his time there. In a 2025 Guitar Player interview, Hinds recalled Mock as a guitarist of complete fretboard command whose openness to different playing approaches made him an encouraging teacher.

Mock's work as an educator was also noted outside the United States. In a 2024 Ultimate Guitar feature, Zakk Wylde named Mock among the guitarists he considered most underrated, comparing his playing to that of John McLaughlin and praising the album Mock One. Following his death, the British magazine Guitar Techniques described him as one of the most important and influential contemporary guitar educators, linking his work at GIT, his REH videos and his books to his influence on successive generations of players.

== Instructional books and videos ==
Beginning in the 1970s, Mock worked with the publisher Roger E. Hutchinson on a series of guitar method books issued by REH Publications; his titles on modal harmony, symmetrical scales, arpeggio substitution and dominant-chord concepts were later reissued and expanded by Alfred Music. In 2010, the British magazine Jazzwise reviewed the reissue of Don Mock's Jazz Guitar Masterclass, describing it as one of the better instructional guides in the field and recommending it to intermediate and advanced players.

Mock also contributed a chapter, "Mastering 'Triads Over Bass Notes'," to the 1982 Musicians Institute Publications anthology Ten: Ten Top Guitarists Offer Their Insights to Guitar Artistry, which collected instructional essays by GIT faculty and visiting artists including Larry Carlton, Joe Pass, Tommy Tedesco, Joe Diorio, Jay Graydon, Ron Escheté, Robben Ford and Eddie Van Halen.

Selected instructional publications:

- Artful Arpeggios: Creative Substitution Principles for Improvising (REH Publications)
- Hot Licks (REH Publications)
- Fusion – Hot Lines (REH Publications)
- Guitar Secrets: Melodic Minor Revealed, Harmonic Minor Revealed, Symmetrical Scales Revealed (Alfred Music)
- Don Mock's Modal Mojo (Alfred Music, 2009)
- Don Mock's Mastering the Dominant Chord (Alfred Music)
- Don Mock's Jazz Guitar Masterclass (Alfred Music, 2009)

From the early 1980s, GIT added video production to its programme, and Mock directed much of the school's instructional video output. When REH Publications launched its instructional video line in the late 1980s, Mock was engaged as its principal director and producer, working on roughly one hundred titles over the following decade. Artists featured in REH videos he directed or produced included Joe Pass, Allan Holdsworth, Robben Ford, Scott Henderson, Herb Ellis, Steve Morse, Paul Gilbert, Pat Martino, Albert Collins, Frank Gambale, Al Di Meola, Keith Wyatt and Joe Diorio. Writing in Earshot Jazz, the critic Paul de Barros credited Mock's instructional videos for GIT with shaping a generation of guitarists.

Mock appeared as the featured artist on the instructional videos The Blues from Rock to Jazz and Jazz Guitar Rhythm Chops.

Mock released the jazz-rock fusion album Mock One in 1978, followed by Speed of Light.

== Later career and death ==
During the 1980s, Mock continued to perform while dividing his time between Los Angeles and Seattle. He formed an acoustic duo with guitarist Jamie Findlay, which expanded into a trio with Robben Ford.

In the 2000s, Mock joined Jay Roberts, son of Howard Roberts, at the Roberts Music Institute in Bellevue, Washington, where he contributed to the curriculum and taught contemporary guitar; the school later relocated to Snoqualmie. Mock and Roberts also performed together as a duo in the Seattle area, and Mock led a regular trio with bassist Steve Kim.

Mock died of prostate cancer on April 14, 2025, at the age of 74. In December 2025, the Musicians Institute published a previously unreleased archival recording of a performance he gave at the school, describing him as one of its first instructors.

== Hydroplane racing ==
Mock was a longstanding enthusiast of hydroplane racing. From the 1980s he built and raced 1/8-scale radio-controlled hydroplanes, a pursuit he continued for more than twenty years. A 2010 Kent Reporter article about a model exhibition at the Hydroplane and Raceboat Museum described him as a board member who had built model boats since childhood; his scale model of the 1982 Atlas Van Lines included a replica of the helmet worn by driver Chip Hanauer.

Mock served as a board member, later vice president, of the Hydroplane and Raceboat Museum in Kent, Washington, and produced video material for the museum. He led volunteer teams in the restoration of two Atlas Van Lines unlimited hydroplanes: the 1982 U-00, driven to the Gold Cup by Chip Hanauer, and the 1977 Atlas Van Lines, known as the "Blue Blaster", which was returned to running condition after more than four years of work and ran at Seafair in 2014.
