= Leonardo Valvassori =

Leonardo 'Leo' Valvassori is a Canadian bassist, cellist, and audio engineer of Italian origin.

Valvassori interned as a member of Ronnie Hawkins and the Hawks between 1981 and 1982. After undergoing three years of chemotherapy and cancer treatment, he went on to extend working relationships with singer Alannah Myles, Mississippi bluesman Mel Brown (as an original 'Homewrecker') and many Canadian artists and American blues musicians. Since 2006, he has been working with Martha Johnson, Mark Gane and Jocelyne Lanois writing songs and recording. He collaborated on the Martha and the Muffins record Delicate (released 2010), credited with "bass, keys, guitar, percussion, 'cello, 'cello cloud, key bass, loudhailer, loops, vocals, and bowed bass".
