= Allen Hinds =

American guitarist (born 1956)

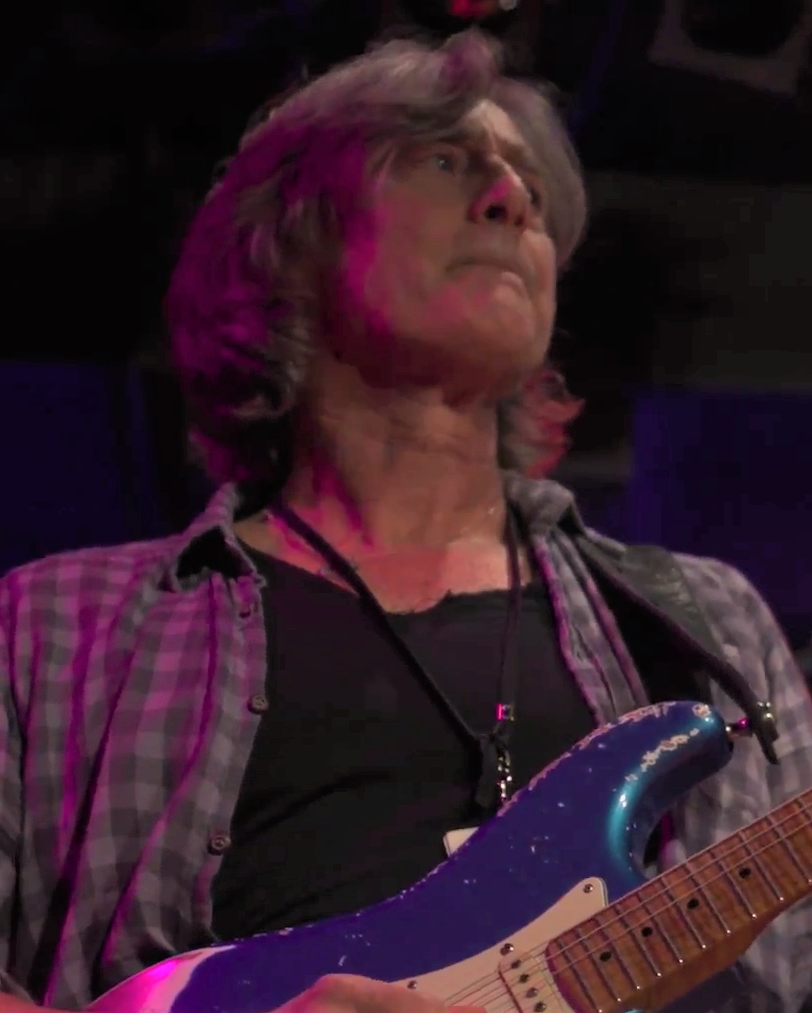

Background information
- Born: 1956 (age 69–70); Auburn, Alabama, United States
- Genres: Blues rock, jazz rock, funk rock, rock
- Occupations: Musician, songwriter
- Instruments: Electric guitar, acoustic guitar
- Years active: 1978–present
- Website: allenhinds.com

Allen Hinds (born 1956) is an American guitarist, who has recorded or performed with Natalie Cole, BeBe & CeCe Winans, The Crusaders, Hiroshima, Roberta Flack, Randy Crawford, Bobby Caldwell, James Ingram, Marilyn Scott, Eric Marienthal, Marc Antoine, Gino Vannelli and Boney James, among many others. His songs have appeared on the TV shows Lucky, JAG, Pawn Stars, Sons of Guns and Sliced, among others. He is also an instructor and artist in residence at the Musicians Institute in Hollywood, California, and has released a number of solo albums.

== Early life and career ==
Hinds was born in Auburn, Alabama, playing blues, R&B, jazz and fusion in his youth. He began playing professionally at clubs and frat parties in major colleges across the American south. He attended the Berklee College of Music, then moved to Los Angeles. He then studied at the Musicians Institute, where he is now a member of its teaching staff.

He has performed as a session musician for, and has performed with, Roberta Flack, Natalie Cole, The Crusaders, Hiroshima, BeBe & CeCe Winans, Marilyn Scott, Randy Crawford, Eric Marienthal, Bobby Caldwell, James Ingram, Marc Antoine, and Gino Vannelli.

== Discography ==
- Fact of the Matter (2005)
- Beyond it All (2006)
- Falling Up (2008)
- Monkeys and Slides (2011)
- Fly South (2016)
- The Good Fight (2024)
