= Ron Escheté =

American jazz guitarist (1948–2026)

- Born: Ronald Patrick Escheté; August 19, 1948; Houma, Louisiana, U.S.
- Died: May 20, 2026 (aged 77)
- Genre: Jazz
- Occupation: Musician
- Instrument: Guitar
- Years active: 1970–2026
- Labels: Muse, Concord Jazz
- Website: www.roneschete.com

Ronald Patrick Escheté (August 19, 1948 – May 20, 2026) was an American seven-string jazz guitarist. He was the first person to record a cover version of "Christmas Time Is Here", which Vince Guaraldi wrote for the 1965 television special A Charlie Brown Christmas.

== Life and career ==
When Escheté was 14, he began playing guitar. During the late 1960s, he studied classical guitar and flute at Loyola University in New Orleans. From 1969 to 1970, he worked in Las Vegas supporting singer Buddy Greco. He moved to Los Angeles, where he played with Dave Pike and Gene Harris.

Escheté was an educator from the early 1970s when he taught at community colleges in southern California. In the mid-1970s, he became one of the original instructors at the Guitar Institute of Technology (GIT) in Los Angeles, alongside Don Mock and Joe Diorio. The school later became part of the Musicians Institute. In the 1990s, he taught at California State University, Long Beach. He has written several instruction books, such as The Jazz Guitar Soloist and Melodic Chord Phrases.

His early influences were jazz guitarists Wes Montgomery, Jim Hall, and Howard Roberts. He has played with Ray Brown, Ella Fitzgerald, Dizzy Gillespie, Milt Jackson, and Diana Krall.

Escheté died suddenly on May 20, 2026, at the age of 77.

== Discography ==
=== As leader ===
- Spirit's Samba (JAS, 1977)
- To Let You Know I Care (Muse, 1979)
- Line-Up (Muse, 1981)
- Christmas Impressions (Music Is Medicine, 1982)
- A Beautiful Friendship (Discovery, 1982) with Dewey Erney
- The Second Set (Sounds Great, 1984) with Dewey Erney
- Stump Jumper (Bainbridge, 1986)
- Mo' Strings Attached (The Jazz Alliance, 1993)
- A Closer Look (Concord Jazz, 1994)
- Rain or Shine (Concord Jazz, 1995)
- Soft Winds (Concord Jazz, 1996)
- You'd Be So Nice To Come Home To (Resurgent, 1998) with Dewey Erney
- The Sunset Hour (Holt, 1998)
- Live at Rocco (RevJazz, 2000)
- No Place To Hide (SMS Jazz, 2001 [2003]) with Mort Weiss
- Still a Beautiful Friendship (Resurgent, 2002) with Dewey Erney
- Homeward Bound (RevJazz, 2003)
- In the Middle: Live at Spazio (RevJazz, 2006)
- All Too Soon (SMS Jazz, 2008) with Mort Weiss
- How My Heart Sings: Live at Steamers (BluePort, 2017)

=== As sideman ===
With Gene Harris

- Hot Lips (JAM, 1982)
- Nature's Way (JAM, 1984)
- Listen Here! (Concord Jazz, 1989)
- Black and Blue (Concord Jazz, 1991)
- Like a Lover (Concord Jazz, 1992)
- A Little Piece of Heaven [live] (Concord Jazz, 1993)
- Funky Gene's (Concord Jazz, 1994)
- Brotherhood (Concord Jazz, 1995)
- It's the Real Soul [live] (Concord Jazz, 1996)
- In His Hands (Concord Jazz, 1997)
- Down Home Blues (Concord Jazz, 1997) with Jack McDuff

With Stix Hooper

- We Went West (Stix Hooper Enterprises, 2015)
- Friends Across the Pond (A Tribute to the George Shearing Quintet) (Stix Hooper Enterprises, 2016)

With Dave Pike

- Times Out of Mind (Muse, 1976)
- On a Gentle Note (Muse, 1978)
- Let the Minstrels Play On (Muse, 1980)
- Moon Bird (Muse, 1983)

With others

- Ernestine Anderson, Be Mine Tonight (Concord Jazz, 1987)
- Ernestine Anderson, Now and Then (Qwest/WB, 1993)
- Ray Anthony, 1988 & All That Jazz (Aero Space, 1988)
- Lanny Aplanalp, Natural Colors (Autumn Down, 2002)
- Jeff Berlin, Taking Notes (Denon, 1997)
- Ray Brown, Don't Forget the Blues (Concord Jazz, 1986)
- Glenn Cashman, Glenn Cashman & The Southland Big Band! (Primrose Lane, 2009)
- Judy Chamberlain, Road Trip (JazzBaby, 2002)
- John Clayton & Jeff Clayton, The Clayton Brothers (Concord Jazz, 1979)
- James Darren, This One's from the Heart (Concord Jazz, 1999)
- Joey DeFrancesco, Falling in Love Again (Concord Jazz, 2003)
- Jan Deneau Trio, Different Shades of Blue (Maria, 1973)
- The Four Freshmen, Four Freshmen and Friends (Four Freshmen Society, 2015)
- Becky Gonzales Hughes, Late Bloomer (Primrose Lane, 2004)
- Tommy Gumina, Polycolors (Polytone, 1990)
- Niki Haris, Dreaming A Dream (BMG [Japan], 1997)
- Johnny Holiday, Johnny Holiday Sings (Contemporary, 1998 [2004])
- Luther Hughes, Luther Hughes & Cahoots (Contemporary, 1987)
- Jacintha, Jacintha Is Her Name (Groove Note, 2003)
- Milt Jackson, Big Mouth (Pablo, 1981)
- Rick Jarrett, Back to Romance (Soulful Sonance, 2001)
- Diana Krall, Live in Paris (Verve, 2002) [on bonus track (of Canadian release)]
- Craig Larson Trio, Legacy (Larson Jazz, 2002)
- Warne Marsh, Two Days in the Life of... (Interplay, 1987)
- Jack McDuff, Color Me Blue (Concord Jazz, 1992)
- Don Rader, Anemone (Jet Danger, 1980)
- Don Rader, A Foreign Affair (L&R/Bellaphon, 1991)
- Herman Riley, Herman (JAM, 1984)
- Charlie Shoemake, Strollin' (Chase, 1991)
- Andy Simpkins, Calamba (Discovery, 1989)
- Keely Smith, I'm in Love Again (Fantasy, 1985)
- Mary Stallings, I Waited for You (Concord Jazz, 1994)
- Mary Stallings, Spectrum (Concord Jazz, 1996)
- Dan St. Marseille, Retrospection (Resurgent, 1995)
- Mort Weiss, Mort Weiss Meets Joey DeFrancesco (SMS Jazz, 2002)
- Mort Weiss, The Three Of Us: The Mort Weiss Trio (SMS Jazz, 2003)
- Mort Weiss, The Four of Us: The Mort Weiss Quartet Live at Steamers (SMS Jazz, 2005)
- Gerry Wiggins, Celebrating Wig's 80th at the Jazz Bakery (Madwig Music, 2004)
- Steve Wilkerson & Joey DeFrancesco, It's A Blues Sorta Thing (Dane, 1999)
- James Zollar, Soaring With Bird (Naxos, 1997)
