= Savannah Jazz Festival =

Annual music festival in Georgia, U.S.

- Genre: Jazz
- Dates: September
- Location: Savannah, Georgia
- Coordinates: 32°08′09″N 81°09′12″W
- Years active: 1981–present
- Website: savannahjazz.org

The Savannah Jazz Festival is an annual celebration of jazz music located in Savannah, Georgia, United States. It takes place for eight days during the last full week in September each year. Events and performances take place in various venues throughout the city, culminating in three days at the historic Forsyth Park. Admission to the event is free.

The Festival is organized by the Coastal Jazz Association (CJA) with funding provided by the City of Savannah Department of Arts and Culture and Historical Resources, as well as other sponsors and CJA members.

== Coastal Jazz Association ==
In 1979, Teddy Adams, Ben Tucker, Randall Reese, Tom Glaser, and Ken Palmer started the Telfair Jazz Society. This went on to become the Coastal Jazz Association (CJA) in 1981.

According to the official Savannah Jazz Festival's website, “The CJA, which is a grassroots non-profit organization that was formed in 1981 in Savannah, Georgia to help Jazz flourish in the Coastal Empire by inspiring Jazz education through various scholarships, by fellowship with other musicians with shared interests and also sponsoring live performances within the city. The CJA is responsible for the annual Savannah Jazz Festival, provides assistance to local jazz artists in need and also hosts the Savannah Jazz Hall of Fame.”

== Origins of the Savannah Jazz Festival ==
The first Savannah Jazz Festival was held at Grayson Stadium on October 1, 1983, as a way for the late Ben Tucker to support those interested in learning more about jazz. It is a 501(c)3 not-for-profit organization which aims is to "inspire and grow audiences in the love of jazz music."
