= Weather Report discography =

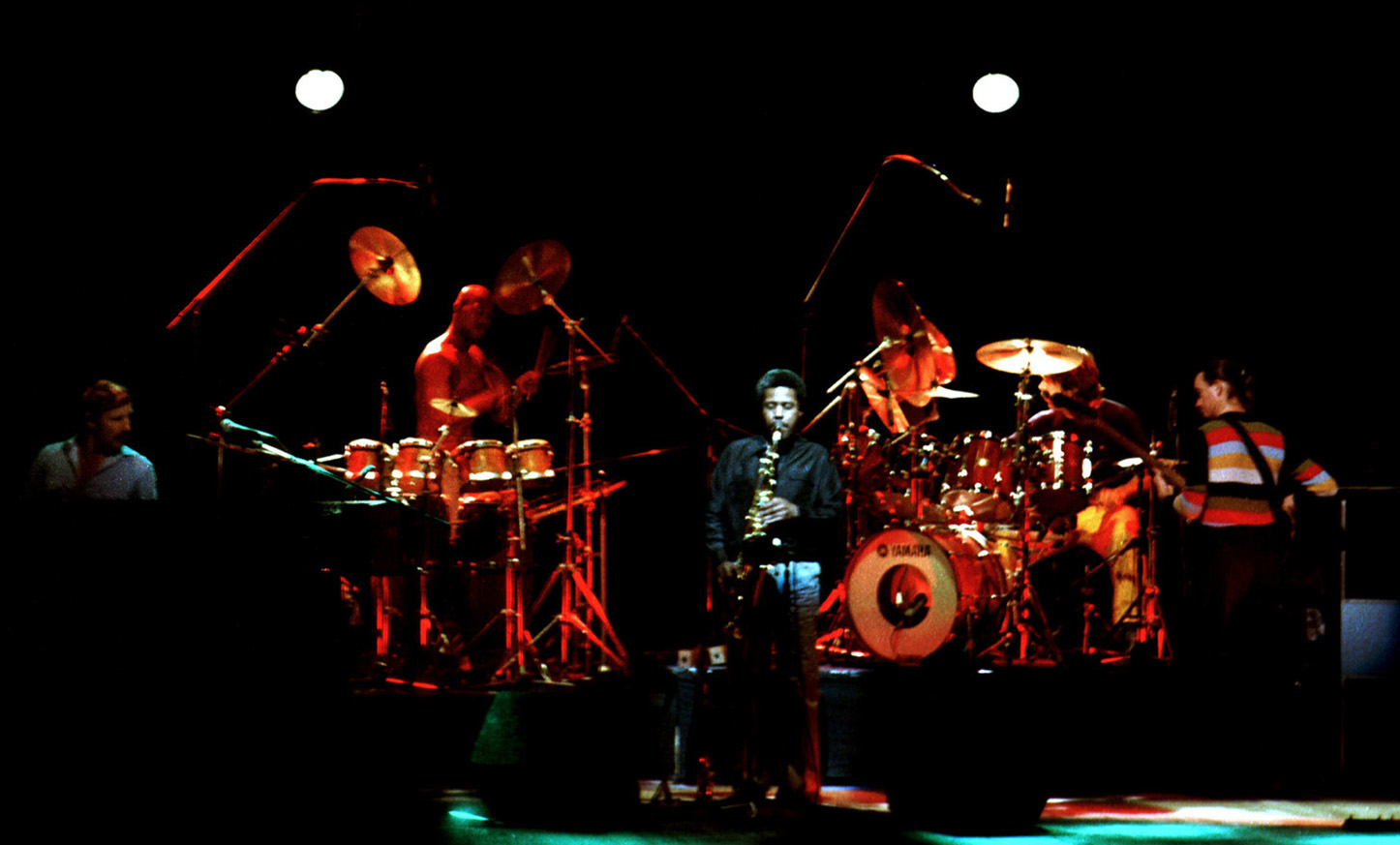
- Weather Report live June 11, 1981.
- Studio albums: 14
- Live albums: 4
- Compilation albums: 11
- Tribute albums: 2
- Singles: 5
- B-sides: 1
- Video albums: 6
- Unofficial releases: 10

The discography of Weather Report, an American jazz band with a career lasting sixteen years between 1970 and 1986, consists of fourteen studio albums, three live albums, eleven compilation albums, five singles, one B-side, and six video albums.

Weather Report's self-titled debut album Weather Report, released in 1971, caused a sensation in the jazz world and is still considered a classic of early fusion. It was awarded Album of the Year by Down Beat magazine's polls that year. In 1972 Weather Report released its second album, I Sing the Body Electric. The first side featured new studio recordings, while the second side was taken from live recordings of a concert in Tokyo, Japan. On 1973's Sweetnighter, Weather Report began to take a new more funk and groove-oriented direction.

Breakout album Mysterious Traveller, released in 1974, was the second of Weather Report's albums to win Down Beat's "Album of the Year" award. Released in 1975, Tale Spinnin' was Weather Report's most solid album to date. It won the Down Beat best album award for 1975.

By 1976's Black Market album, Weather Report's music had evolved further from open-ended funk jams into more melody and rock-oriented and concise forms. It continued Weather Report's ongoing run of success, selling well and being the fourth of the band's albums to win Down Beat's album of the year award. The band's next album was 1977's acclaimed Heavy Weather, which proved to be the band's most successful recording. It would dominate Weather Report's disc awards, including their last Down Beat "Album of the Year" award.

By 1978 the band released its eighth album, Mr. Gone. The album rose to No. 1 on the Billboard Jazz Albums chart. The 1979 double live album 8:30, recorded on the Mr Gone tour, won that year's Grammy Award for Best Jazz Fusion Performance. Weather Report's ninth studio album, Night Passage, was released in 1980, and its second eponymous release following the 1970 debut album was recorded in 1981 and released in 1982.

In 1983, the band released its eleventh studio album Procession, which showed the band returning to the "world music". It was praised by Down Beat for its "unity and joy" and it has come to be seen as one of the best Weather Report albums. Weather Report then recorded Domino Theory and Live in Japan in 1984, Sportin' Life in 1985, and the finale album This Is This! in 1986. By February 1986, Shorter left the band, and Zawinul dissolved the band in 1987.

Many video, compilation and live albums were released after the breakup of the band. Live and Unreleased was made available in 2002. In September 2006 Columbia/Legacy released a Weather Report box set, Forecast: Tomorrow. A DVD video of the 1976 Montreux Jazz Festival performance has become available as well. Columbia/Legacy have also re-released the 1984 Live in Japan concert on DVD.

== Studio albums ==
Year	Album	Peak chart positions						Certifications	Labels	Note
Year	Album	US Pop	US Jazz	US R&B	SWE	NOR	UK	Certifications	Labels	Note
1971	Weather Report	191	7	—	—	—	—		Columbia	
1972	I Sing the Body Electric	147	—	—	—	—	—		Columbia	Three tracks are recorded live
1973	Sweetnighter	85	2	41	—	—	—		Columbia	
1974	Mysterious Traveller	46	2	31	—	—	—		Columbia	
1975	Tale Spinnin'	31	3	12	—	—	—		Columbia	
1976	Black Market	42	2	20	—	—	—		Columbia	
1977	Heavy Weather	30	1	33	40	—	43	RIAA: Platinum	Columbia	
1978	Mr. Gone	52	1	—	42	—	47		ARC/Columbia	
1980	Night Passage	57	2	—	—	36	—		ARC/Columbia	One track is recorded live
1982	Weather Report	68	5	—	—	30	92		ARC/Columbia	
1983	Procession	96	3	46	—	—	—		Columbia	
1984	Domino Theory	136	5	—	—	—	54		Columbia	Three tracks are recorded live
1985	Sportin' Life	191	13	—	—	—	—		Columbia	
1986	This Is This!	195	13	—	—	—	—		Columbia	
"—" denotes releases that did not chart or were not released in that country.

== Live albums ==
Year	Album	Peak chart positions			Labels
Year	Album	BB 200	Jazz Albums	R&B	Labels
1972	Live in Tokyo	—	—	—	CBS/Sony
1979	8:30	47	3	—	ARC/Columbia
2002	Live and Unreleased	—	21	—	Columbia
2015	The Legendary Live Tapes: 1978–1981	—	7	50	Columbia

== Compilations ==
Year	Album	Peak chart positions
Year	Album	Billboard Jazz
1983	Die 70er Jahre Additional information Format: LP; Released: 1983; Recorded: 1971–1980; Genre: Jazz fusion Length: 42:23; Label: Zweitausendeins, CBS, 54 491 Track listing Side one: 1. "Black Market" (Joe Zawinul) – 6:30; 2. "Teen Town" (Jaco Pastorius) – 2:53; 3. "American Tango" (Zawinul, Miroslav Vitous) – 3:42; 4. "Umbrellas" (Zawinul, Vitous, Wayne Shorter) – 3:24; 5. "Second Sunday in August" (Zawinul) – 4:04; Side two: 1. "Birdland" (Zawinul) 5:59; 2. "Port of Entry" (Shorter) – 5:06; 3. "A Remark You Made" (Zawinul) – 7:40; 4. "Barbary Coast" (Pastorius) – 3:05	—
1990	Best of Weather Report Vol. I Additional information Format: CD; Released: 1990; Recorded: 1971–1986; Genre: Jazz fusion Length: 69:36; Label: Columbia 466996-2 Track listing: 1. "Birdland" (Joe Zawinul) – 5:59; 2. "And Then" (Zawinul) – 3:19; 3. "A Remark You Made" (Zawinul) – 6:52; 4. "Second Sunday in August" (Zawinul) – 4:04; 5. "Herandnu" (Alphonso Johnson) – 6:35; 6. "Tears" (Wayne Shorter) – 3:22; 7. "Elegant People" (Shorter) – 5:02; 8. "Eurydice" (Shorter) – 5:43; 9. "Man With the Copper Fingers" (Zawinul) – 6:12; 10. "Where the Moon Goes" (Zawinul, Lyrics by Nan O'Byrne and Zawinul ) – 7:47; 11. "Harlequin" (Shorter) – 4:00; 12. "Speechless" (Zawinul) – 5:56; 13. "Palladíum" (Shorter) – 4:45; Guest musicians: The Manhattan Transfer – Vocals on "Where the Moon Goes"; Maurice White – Vocals on "And Then"	—
1990	The Collection Additional information Format: CD; Released: 1990; Recorded: 1976–1980; Genre: Jazz fusion Length: 76:15; Label: Castle CCS CD 244 Track listing: 1. "Birdland" (Joe Zawinul) – 6:05; 2. "Teen Town" (Jaco Pastorius) – 2:55; 3. "The Juggler" (Zawinul) – 5:08; 4. "The Pursuit of the Woman with the Feathered Hat" (Zawinul) – 5:04; 5. "The Elders" (Wayne Shorter) – 4:21; 6. "Punk Jazz" (Pastorius) – 5:10; 7. "And Then" (Zawinul) – 3:22; 8. "Black Market" (Live) (Zawinul) – 9:36; 9. "A Remark You Made" (Live) (Zawinul) – 7:47; 10. "Night Passage" (Zawinul) – 6:32; 11. "Rockin' in Rhythm" (Duke Ellington, Irving Mills, Harry Carney) – 3:03; 12. "Fast City" (Zawinul) – 6:19; 13. "Madagascar" (Zawinul) – 10:53; Reissues: 1994 Griffin 254 (CD)	—
1993	Starbox Additional information Format: CD; Released: 19 November 1993; Recorded: 19??-19?? Genre: Jazz fusion Length: ??:?? Label: Sony 6907	—
1996	Birdland Additional information Format: CD; Released: 19 March 1996; Recorded: 19??-19?? Genre: Jazz fusion Length: ??:?? Label: Sony	—
1996	This Is Jazz, Vol. 10: Weather Report Additional information Format: CD; Released: 30 April 1996; Recorded: 1971–1978; Genre: Jazz fusion Length: 56:38; Label: Sony CK 64627 Track listing: 1. "Birdland" (Joe Zawinul) – 6:01; 2. "A Remark You Made" (Zawinul) – 6:53; 3. "Black Market" (Zawinul) – 6:32; 4. "Man in the Green Shirt" (Zawinul) – 6:31; 5. "Young and Fine" (Zawinul) – 6:57; 6. "The Moors" (Wayne Shorter) – 4:45; 7. "Mysterious Traveller" (Shorter) – 7:24; 8. "Orange Lady" (Zawinul) – 8:43; 9. "Teen Town" (Jaco Pastorius) – 2:52; Reissues: 2001 as Jazz Collection: Weather Report Sony 488634 (CD)	—
1998	This Is Jazz, Vol. 40: Weather Report – The Jaco Years Additional information Format: CD; Released: 28 April 1998; Recorded: 1975–1981; Genre: Jazz fusion Length: 54:54; Label: Columbia, Sony CK 65451 Track listing: 1. "Punk Jazz" (Jaco Pastorius) – 5:08; 2. "River People" (Pastorius) – 4:50; 3. "A Remark You Made" (Joe Zawinul) – 8:00; 4. "Havona" (Pastorius) – 6:00; 5. "Three Views of a Secret" (Pastorius) – 5:52; 6. "Teen Town" (Pastorius) – 6:05; 7. "Speechless" (Zawinul) – 5:57; 8. "Port of Entry" (Wayne Shorter) – 5:07; 9. "Barbary Coast" (Pastorius) – 3:07; 10. "Slang" (Pastorius) – 4:48	—
2002	The Best of Weather Report Additional information Format: CD; Released: 4 June 2002; Recorded: 1973–1980; Genre: Jazz fusion Length: 74:36; Label: Columbia/Legacy, Sony, 85400, 5076592, SICP-238 Track listing: 1. "Birdland" (Joe Zawinul) – 5:58; 2. "Mysterious Traveller" (Wayne Shorter) – 7:21; 3. "Boogie Woogie Waltz" (Zawinul) – 13:04; 4. "The Elders" (Shorter) – 4:20; 5. "Night Passage" (Zawinul) – 6:32; 6. "Freezing Fire" (Shorter) – 7:28; 7. "A Remark You Made" (Zawinul) – 6:52; 8. "Elegant People" (Shorter) – 5:05; 9. "Man in the Green Shirt" (Zawinul) – 6:28; 10. "Blackthorn Rose" (Shorter) – 4:59; 11. "Black Market" (Zawinul) – 6:29; Reissues: 2007 Sony BMG 88697127632, 238, Columbia Legacy 712763 (CD); 2008 Columbia 88697342352 (CD)	—
2006	Forecast: Tomorrow Additional information Format: 3-CD + 1-DVD Box set Released: 19 September 2006; Recorded: 1969–1985, 2005; Genre: Jazz fusion Length: 223:37 (Disc One: 78:38; Disc Two: 68:51; Disc Three: 76:08); Label: Columbia/Legacy 85570, Sony 82876855752; Producer: Bob Belden, Joe Zawinul, Wayne Shorter Track listing Disc One: 1. "In a Silent Way" (Joe Zawinul) – 4:17; 2. "Super Nova" (Wayne Shorter) – 4:48; 3. "Experience in E Major" (Excerpt) (Zawinul) – 5:42; 4. "Milky Way" (Shorter, Zawinul) – 2:31; 5. "Tears" (Shorter) – 3:23; 6. "Eurydice" (Full Version) (Shorter) – 10:44; 7. "Orange Lady" (Zawinul) – 8:42; 8. "Unknown Soldier" (Zawinul) – 7:58; 9. "Directions" (Take 1) (Zawinul) – 5:29; 10. "Surucucu" (Shorter) – 8:19; 11. "Second Sunday in August" (Zawinul) – 4:12; 12. "125th Street Congress" (Zawinul) – 12:14; Disc Two: 1. "Nubian Sundance" (Live) (Joe Zawinul) – 13:05; 2. "Blackthorn Rose" (Wayne Shorter) – 5:01; 3. "Badia" (Zawinul) – 5:21; 4. "Cannon Ball" (Zawinul) – 4:38; 5. "Black Market" (Zawinul) – 6:33; 6. "Three Clowns" (Shorter) – 3:24; 7. "Havona" (Jaco Pastorius) – 6:01; 8. "Birdland" (Zawinul) – 5:58; 9. "Palladíum" (Shorter) – 4:47; 10. "The Pursuit of the Woman With the Feathered Hat" (Zawinul) – 5:03; 11. "The Orphan" (Shorter, Zawinul) – 3:17; 12. "Sightseeing" (Shorter) – 5:35; Disc Three: 1. "Dream Clock" (Joe Zawinul) – 6:28; 2. "Three Views of a Secret" (Jaco Pastorius) – 5:53; 3. "Port of Entry" (Live) (Wayne Shorter) – 5:08; 4. "Dara Factor Two" (Zawinul, Shorter, Pastorius, Peter Erskine, Robert Thomas Jr.) – 4:27; 5. "Procession" (Zawinul) – 8:42; 6. "Plaza Real" (Shorter) – 5:28; 7. "The Well" (Shorter) – 3:57; 8. "D♭ Waltz" (Zawinul) – 11:12; 9. "Domino Theory" (Zawinul) – 6:10; 10. "Predator" (Shorter) – 5:20; 11. "Face on the Barroom Floor" (Shorter) – 3:58; 12. "Indiscretions" (Zawinul) – 4:06; 13. "125th Street Congress (DJ Logic Remix)" (Zawinul) – 5:04; DVD (Concert in Offenbach am Main, on September 29, 1978, for the German TV program Rockpalast): 1. "Black Market" (Joe Zawinul); 2. "Scarlet Woman" (Alphonso Johnson, Zawinul, Wayne Shorter); 3. "Young and Fine" (Zawinul); 4. "The Pursuit of the Woman With the Feathered Hat" (Zawinul); 5. "A Remark You Made" (Zawinul); 6. "River People" (Jaco Pastorius); 7. "Thanks for the Memory" (Leo Robin, Ralph Rainger); 8. "Delores" (Shorter) / "Portrait of Tracy" (Pastorius) / "Third Stone from the Sun" (Jimi Hendrix); 9. "Mr. Gone" (Zawinul); 10. "In a Silent Way" (Zawinul); 11. "Waterfall" (Zawinul); 12. "Teen Town" (Pastorius); 13. "I Got It Bad (and That Ain't Good)" (Duke Ellington, Paul Francis Webster) / "The Midnight Sun Will Never Set on You" (Lionel Hampton, Sonny Burke, Johnny Mercer); 14. "Birdland" (Zawinul); 15. Introductions; 16. "Fred & Jack" (Peter Erskine); 17. "Elegant People" (Shorter); 18. "Badia" (Zawinul); Personnel for the Offenbach Concert: Joe Zawinul – keyboards; Wayne Shorter – Saxophones; Jaco Pastorius – bass; Peter Erskine – drums	18
2007	Original Album Classics: Weather Report Additional information Format: 5-CD; Released: 29 October 2007; Recorded: 1972–1980; Genre: Jazz fusion Length: 225:57 (Disc One: 46:28; Disc Two: 44:41; Disc Three: 48:11; Disc Four: 36:55; Disc Five: 49:42); Label: Columbia Legacy 88697145472 Notes Reissue of I Sing The Body Electric (1972), Sweetnighter (1973), Mysterious Traveller (1974), Black Market (1976), and Night Passage (1980) in miniature cardboard sleeves with the original LP-artwork.	—
2008	Collections Additional information Format: CD; Released: 25 February 2008; Recorded: 1971–1983; Genre: Jazz fusion Length: 78:11; Label: Sony 88697252732 Track listing: 1. "Birdland" (Joe Zawinul) – 5:58; 2. "Black Market" (Zawinul) – 6:31; 3. "Night Passage" (Zawinul) – 6:33; 4. "Can It Be Done" (Wilson Tee) – 4:04; 5. "A Remark You Made" (Zawinul) – 6:52; 6. "Man in the Green Shirt" (Zawinul) – 6:29; 7. "Orange Lady" (Zawinul) – 8:42; 8. "Teen Town" (Jaco Pastorius) – 6:07; 9. "D♭ Waltz" (Zawinul) – 11:12; 10. "Cucumber Slumber" (Alphonso Johnson, Zawinul) – 8:22; 11. "Mysterious Traveller" (Wayne Shorter) – 7:21	—

== Singles ==
Year	Title
1973	"125th Street Congress" Additional information Single by Weather Report from the Album Sweetnighter; B-side: "Will" (Miroslav Vitous) – 2:37; Released: 1973; Format: 7", Promo; Recorded: February 1973; Genre: Jazz fusion Length: 2:58; Label: Columbia 4-45964; Writer(s): Joe Zawinul; Producer: Shoviza Productions, Joe Zawinul, Wayne Shorter
1973	"Boogie Woogie Waltz" (Stereo) Additional information Single by Weather Report from the Album Sweetnighter; B-side: "Boogie Woogie Waltz" (Mono) (Joe Zawinul) – ?:?? Released: 1973; Format: 7", Promo; Recorded: February 1973; Genre: Jazz fusion Length: ?:?? Label: Columbia 4-45883 DJ; Writer(s): Joe Zawinul; Producer: Joe Zawinul, Wayne Shorter
1978	"Birdland" Additional information Single by Weather Report from the Album Heavy Weather; Released: 1978; Format: 7" and 12"; Recorded: Late 1976 – Early 1977 at the Devonshire Sound Studios in North Hollywood, California; Genre: Jazz fusion Length: 3:45; Label: Columbia, CBS, ARC; Writer(s): Joe Zawinul; Producer: Joe Zawinul, Jaco Pastorius, Wayne Shorter 12" CBS S CBS 12 7701 track listing Side A: 1. "Birdland" – 5:59; Side B: 1. "River People" (Jaco Pastorius) – 4:47; 2. "A Remark You Made" (Zawinul) – 6:52; Versions: 1977 Columbia 3-10532 (7", Promo; U.S.); 1977 CBS S CBS 12 7701 (12". UK); 1977 Columbia AS 318 (12", Promo; U.S.); 1977 CBS CBS 5588 (7", Promo; Netherlands); 1977 CBS S CBS 5205 (7", Single; UK); 1978 "Birdland" / "Brown Street" ARC AS 713 (12", Promo; US)
1978	"River People" Additional information Single by Weather Report from the Album Mr. Gone; B-side: "Birdland" (Joe Zawinul) – 5:59; Released: 1978; Format: 7"; Recorded: May 1978; Genre: Jazz fusion Length: 4:47; Label: CBS, ARC; Writer(s): Jaco Pastorius; Producer: Joe Zawinul, Jaco Pastorius Versions: 1978 CBS CBS 6743 (7"; Netherlands); 1978 CBS S CBS 6743 (7", Promo; UK); 1978 "River People" (Jaco Pastorius) / "The Pursuit of the Woman with the Feathered Hat" (Zawinul) ARC ASD 515 (12" 33⅓ rpm, Promo; U.S.)
1983	"Procession" / "Where the Moon Goes" Additional information Single by Weather Report from the Album Procession; Released: 1983; Format: 2×12"; Recorded: 1983; Genre: Jazz fusion Label: CBS; Writer(s): Joe Zawinul; Producer: Joe Zawinul, Wayne Shorter Track listing Disc one: 1. "Procession" (Joe Zawinul) – 8:35; Disc two: 1. "Where the Moon Goes" (Zawinul, Lyrics by Nan O'Byrne and Zawinul) – 7:46

== B-sides ==
- 1990: "The Groove" (by Rodney Franklin) / "Birdland" (12") Old Gold (2) 1990

== Videography ==
Year	Title
1971	Beat Club 1971 Additional information Format: VHS; Released: August 1971; Recorded: July 1971 in Bremen, Germany; Aired: 9 August 1971 by Radio Bremen; Genre: Jazz fusion Length: ca. 10 mins Track listing: 1. "Waterfall" (Joe Zawinul); Weather Report: Joe Zawinul – Keyboards; Wayne Shorter – Saxophone; Miroslav Vitous – Bass; Alphonse Mouzon – Drums, voice; Dom Um Romão – Percussion
1976	Live at Montreux 1976 Additional information Format: VHS; Released: 1976; Recorded: 8 July 1976 at the Montreux Jazz Fest in Montreux, Switzerland; Genre: Jazz fusion Length: ca. 84 mins (DVD) Track listing: 1. "Elegant People" (Wayne Shorter) – 6:35; 2. "Scarlet Woman" (Alphonso Johnson, Shorter, Joe Zawinul) – 8:23; 3. "Come On, Come Over" / "Barbary Coast" (Jaco Pastorius) – 9:45; 4. "Portrait of Tracy" (Pastorius) – 5:22; 5. "Cannon Ball" (Zawinul) – 6:36; 6. "Black Market" (Zawinul) – 10:08; 7. "Rumba Mama" (Manolo Badrena, Alex Acuña) – 6:25; 8. Keyboard and Saxophone Duet (Zawinul, Shorter) – 5:12; 9. "Dr. Honoris Causa" / "Directions" (Zawinul) [DVD only] – 7:25; 10. "Badia" / "Gibraltar" (Zawinul) – 17:10; Weather Report: Joe Zawinul – Keyboards; Wayne Shorter – Saxophone; Jaco Pastorius – Bass; Alex Acuña – Drums; Manolo Badrena – Percussion; Reissues: 2006 Indie 0006 (DVD); 2007 Eagle Vision 39146/EREDV629, Rajon Vision RV0756 (DVD)
1978	Young and Fine Live! Additional information Format: VHS; Released: 1978; Recorded: 29 September 1978 at the Stadthalle in Offenbach, Germany for the German TV program Rockpalast; Aired: 1978; Genre: Jazz fusion Length: ca. 118 mins Track listing: 1. "Black Market" (Joe Zawinul) – 10:02; 2. "Scarlet Woman" (Alphonso Johnson, Wayne Shorter, Zawinul) – 9:23; 3. "Young and Fine" (Zawinul) – 6:46; 4. "The Pursuit of the Woman with the Feathered Hat" (Zawinul) – 6:48; 5. "A Remark You Made" (Zawinul) – 7:04; 6. "River People" (Jaco Pastorius) – 7:53; 7. "Thanks for the Memory" (Leo Robin, Ralph Rainger) – 3:47; 8. "Dolores" (Pastorius) / "A Portrait of Tracy" (Pastorius) / Slang (Pastorius) / "Third Stone from the Sun" (Jimi Hendrix) – 9:51; 9. "Mr. Gone (Zawinul) – 2:08; 10. "In a Silent Way" (Zawinul) – ?:??; 11. "Waterfall" (Zawinul) – 1:54; 12. "Teen Town" (Pastorius) – 8:09; 13. "I Got It Bad (and That Ain't Good)" (Duke Ellington, Paul Francis Webster) – 8:48; 14. "Birdland" (Zawinul) – 8:36; 15. "Fred and Jack" (Johnson, Shorter, Zawinul) – 6:17; 16. "Elegant People" (Zawinul) – 8:09; 17. "Badia" / "Boogie Woogie Waltz" (Zawinul) – 13:14; Weather Report: Joe Zawinul – Keyboards; Wayne Shorter – Saxophone; Jaco Pastorius – Bass; Peter Erskine – Drums; Reissues: 2006 Indie 91888 (DVD); Notes The DVD of the Stadthalle concert is also featured in the Forecast: Tomorrow Box set released in 2006.
1984	The Evolutionary Spiral Additional information Format: VHS; Released: 1984; Recorded: 1983–1984; Genre: Jazz fusion Length: ca. 22 mins Label: Sony Music Entertainment Track listing: 1. "Procession" (Joe Zawinul); 2. "Plaza Real" (Wayne Shorter); 3. "Two Lines" (Zawinul); Weather Report: Joe Zawinul – Keyboards; Wayne Shorter – Saxophone; Victor Bailey – Bass; Omar Hakim – Drums; José Rossy – Percussion
1984	Japan Domino Theory: Weather Report Live in Tokyo Additional information Format: VHS; Released: 1984; Recorded: 1984 in Japan; Genre: Jazz fusion Length: ??:?? Label: Hendring: HEN 2 030 D Track listing: 1. "D♭ Waltz" (Joe Zawinul); 2. Duet (Improvisation); 3. "Where the Moon Goes" (Zawinul, Lyrics by Nan O'Byrne and Zawinul); 4. Medley; 5. "8:30"; 6. "Black Market" (Zawinul); 7. "Elegant People" (Wayne Shorter); 8. "Swamp Cabbage" (Shorter); 9. "Badia" (Zawinul); 10. "A Remark You Made" (Zawinul); 11. "Birdland" (Zawinul); Weather Report: Joe Zawinul – Keyboards; Wayne Shorter – Saxophone; Victor Bailey – Bass; Omar Hakim – Drums, voice; Reissues: 2008 Mc 110389 (DVD)
2010	Live in Hamburg 1971 Additional information Format: DVD; Released: May 2010; Recorded: 1971; Genre: Jazz fusion Length: ??:?? Label: MVD HST001DVD Track listing: 1. "Umbrellas" (Wayne Shorter, Miroslav Vitous, Joe Zawinul); 2. "Orange Lady" (Zawinul); 3. "Waterfall" (Zawinul); 4. "Seventh Arrow" (Vitous); 5. "T.H." (Vitous); 6. "Morning Lake" (Vitous); 7. Improvised Medley including "Dr. Honoris Causa" (Zawinul); Weather Report: Joe Zawinul – Keyboards; Wayne Shorter – Saxophone; Miroslav Vitous – Bass; Alphonse Mouzon – Drums, voice; Dom Um Romão – Percussion

== Tribute albums ==
Year	Title
2000	Celebrating the Music of Weather Report Additional information Artist: Various Artists; Format: CD; Released: 22 February 2000; Recorded: 1999–2000; Genre: Jazz fusion Length: 58:24; Label: Telarc 83473; Producer: Jason Miles Track listing: 1. "Birdland" (Joe Zawinul) – 6:03; 2. "Elegant People" (Wayne Shorter) – 5:16; 3. "Badia" (Zawinul) – 5:34; 4. "Young and Fine" (Zawinul) – 4:57; 5. "Cannon Ball" (Zawinul) – 4:50; 6. "The Pursuit of the Woman With the Feathered Hat" (Zawinul) – 5:10; 7. "Mysterious Traveller" (Shorter) – 4:39; 8. "Harlequin" (Shorter) – 4:38; 9. "The Man in the Green Shirt" (Zawinul) – 6:03; 10. "Palladium" (Shorter) – 5:07; 11. "Cucumber Slumber" (Alphonso Johnson, Zawinul) – 6:07; Personnel: Michael Brecker; David Sanborn; Aaron Heick; Jay Beckenstein; Andy Narell; Randy Brecker; Marcus Miller; John Scofield; Dean Brown; Vinnie Colaiuta; Notes Tribute album to celebrate the 30th anniversary of Weather Report's formation.
2005	Mysterious Voyages: A Tribute to Weather Report Additional information Artist: Various Artists; Format: 2-CD; Released: 24 May 2005; Recorded: 2005; Genre: Jazz fusion Length: ??:?? Label: Tone Center B0009HLCMO, ESC 4039 Track listing Disc one: 1. Scott Kinsey – "Big Rock" – 4:38; 2. Marcus Miller – "Teen Town" – 4:56; 3. Yuri Honing and Michiel Borstlap – "Memory of Enchantment" – 4:12; 4. Trinity – "Weather Is Changing" – 7:57; 5. Michael Wolff Trio – "Pinocchio" – 5:30; 6. Tribal Tech – "You May Remember Me" – 4:44; 7. Jackie McLean – "Three Views of a Secret" – 7:40; 8. Kai Eckhardt – "Queen of Cups" – 9:11; 9. Ángel Celada – "Corner Pocket" – 7:17; 10. Richard S. & The Vibe Tribe – "Travels" – 8:29; 11. Rachel Z Trio – "On the Milky Way Express" – 6:09; 12. Gary Willis – "Emancipation" – 4:52; Disc two: 1. The White House – "Bombay" – 6:18; 2. Christian Jacob and Terje Gewelt – "A Remark You Made" – 5:19; 3. Rocco Zifarelli – "Havona" – 7:36; 4. Jim Beard – "Fever" – 5:51; 5. Acoustic Mania – "Birdland" – 5:38; 6. Torsten de Winkel – "Scarlet Woman" – 5:08; 7. Karizma – "Palladium" – 7:32; 8. Tony Grey – "White Woods" – 7:59; 9. Alex Gunia – "American Tango" – 9:10; 10. Slop Shop – "Overlook Hotel" – 4:33; 11. Mantra – "Mysterious Traveller" – 7:29; 12. Clive Stevens – "Beat 17" – 4:20; Notes 24 different groups of fusion musicians paying tribute to Weather Report.

== Unofficial releases ==
- 1971: Live in Vienna, November 1971 (LP)
- 1971: Berlin, September 3, 1971 (with Eje Thelin, Alan Skidmore, and John Surman) (LP)
- 1974: Solarization's (LP)
- 1978: In a Silent Phoenix (LP)
- 1978: Live Weather (LP)
- 1980: Hammersmith Affair (LP)
- 1980: Live Passage (LP)
- 1980: Paris Live 1980 (LP)
- 1981: At The Opera House 1981 (LP)
- 1998: Milky Way SELL 1140 (CD)
- 2000: Paris Live 1980, Vol. 1 Gemini (CD)
