= Live and Unreleased (album) =

Live album by Weather Report
- Released: October 1, 2002
- Recorded: November 27–28, 1975; September 10, 1977; November 30, 1977; July 12–13, 1980; June 3, 1983
- Genre: Jazz fusion
- Length: Total: 131:31; Disc One: 61:13; Disc Two: 70:25
- Label: Columbia
- Producer: Joe Zawinul, Ivan Zawinul, Bob Belden

Weather Report chronology
This is This! (1986)	Live and Unreleased (2002)	Forecast: Tomorrow (2006)

Professional ratings
Review scores
Source	Rating
AllMusic	4/5 stars
The Penguin Guide to Jazz Recordings	3.5/4 stars

Live and Unreleased is a compilation of live recordings of the jazz fusion band Weather Report, released on Legacy Recordings in 2002. The tracks are taken from live performances that took place from November 27, 1975 to June 3, 1983. It is their third official live recording after the Japan-only Live in Tokyo from 1972 and 8:30 from 1979, although previous albums such as Heavy Weather (1977) and Night Passage (1980) also included occasional live tracks.

The discs are sequenced in non-chronological fashion, with songs from different line-ups cross-faded into one another. The compositions "In a Silent Way" and "Directions" had both been recorded by Miles Davis during the tenure of Josef Zawinul and Wayne Shorter in the Davis band. Compositions appeared on the following Weather Report albums: "Waterfall" on the band's debut; "Dr. Honoris Causa" on I Sing the Body Electric; "Cucumber Slumber" on Mysterious Traveller; "Freezing Fire" and "Man in the Green Shirt" on Tale Spinnin'; "Elegant People" and "Black Market" on Black Market; "Teen Town" and "Rumba Mamá" on Heavy Weather; "River People" on Mr. Gone; "Fast City," "Night Passage," and "Port of Entry" on Night Passage; "Plaza Real," "Where the Moon Goes," and "Two Lines" on Procession. "Portrait of Tracy" appeared on Jaco Pastorius, and "Cigano" is a previously unissued song.

== Track listing ==
=== Disc one ===
No.	Title	Writer(s)	Venue/Date	Length
1.	"Freezing Fire"	Wayne Shorter	The New Victoria Theatre, London, November 27, 1975	8:14
2.	"Plaza Real"	Wayne Shorter	Hammersmith Odeon, London, June 3, 1983	7:04
3.	"Fast City"	Josef Zawinul	The Complex, Santa Monica, July 12, 1980	6:49
4.	"Portrait of Tracy"	Jaco Pastorius	Majestic Theater, Grand Rapids, November 30, 1977	5:57
5.	"Elegant People"	Wayne Shorter	Majestic Theater, Grand Rapids, November 30, 1977	4:28
6.	"Cucumber Slumber"	Alphonso Johnson, Josef Zawinul	The New Victoria Theatre, London, November 27, 1975	11:39
7.	"Teen Town"	Jaco Pastorius	The Rainbow, London, September 10, 1977	6:30
8.	"Man in the Green Shirt"	Josef Zawinul	The New Victoria Theatre, London, November 27, 1975	10:31

=== Disc two ===
No.	Title	Writer(s)	Venue/Date	Length
1.	"Black Market"	Josef Zawinul	The Rainbow, London, September 10, 1977	9:26
2.	"Where the Moon Goes"	Nan O'Byrne, Josef Zawinul	Hammersmith Odeon, London, June 3, 1983	12:05
3.	"River People"	Jaco Pastorius	Celebrity Theatre, Phoenix, Arizona, November 28, 1978	6:57
4.	"Two Lines"	Josef Zawinul	Hammersmith Odeon, London, June 3, 1983	8:15
5.	"Cigano"	Wayne Shorter	The New Victoria Theatre, London, November 27, 1975	3:59
6.	"In a Silent Way, Waterfall"	Josef Zawinul	Unknown venue, Phoenix, Arizona, November 28, 1978	5:45
7.	"Night Passage"	Josef Zawinul	The Complex, Santa Monica, July 13, 1980	5:53
8.	"Port of Entry"	Wayne Shorter	The Complex, Santa Monica, July 13, 1980	8:08
9.	"Rumba Mamá"	Alex Acuña, Manolo Badrena	The Rainbow, London, September 10, 1977	1:15
10.	"Directions/Dr. Honoris Causa"	Josef Zawinul	The New Victoria Theatre, London, November 27, 1975	8:38

== Personnel ==
Weather Report

- Joe Zawinul – keyboards
- Wayne Shorter – saxophones
- Alphonso Johnson – bass on "Freezing Fire", "Cucumber Slumber", "Man in the Green Shirt", "Cigano", and "Directions/Dr. Honoris Causa"
- Chester Thompson – drums on "Freezing Fire", "Cucumber Slumber", "Man in the Green Shirt", "Cigano", and "Directions/Dr. Honoris Causa"
- Jaco Pastorius – fretless bass on "Fast City", "Portrait of Tracy", "Elegant People", "Teen Town", "Black Market", "River People", "In a Silent Way/Waterfall", "Night Passage", and "Port of Entry"
- Alex Acuña – drums on "Portrait of Tracy", "Elegant People", "Teen Town", and "Black Market"; percussion on "Freezing Fire", "Cucumber Slumber", "Man in the Green Shirt", "Cigano", "Rumba Mamá", and "Directions/Dr. Honoris Causa"
- Manolo Badrena – percussion on "Portrait of Tracy", "Elegant People", "Teen Town", "Black Market", and "Rumba Mamá"
- Peter Erskine – drums on "Fast City", "River People", "In a Silent Way/Waterfall", "Night Passage", and "Port of Entry"
- Robert Thomas Jr. – percussion on "Fast City", "Night Passage", and "Port of Entry"
- Victor Bailey – bass on "Plaza Real", "Where the Moon Goes", and "Two Lines"
- Omar Hakim – drums on "Plaza Real", "Where the Moon Goes", and "Two Lines"
- José Rossy – percussion on "Plaza Real", "Where the Moon Goes", and "Two Lines"

Production

- Josef Zawinul, Wayne Shorter – original recording producers
- Josef Zawinul, Ivan Zawinul, Bob Belden – release producers
- Ivan Zawinul, Jim Anderson – mixing
- Fabiola Cáceres, Howard Fritzson – art direction
- Leigh Wells – cover illustration
