= List of awards and nominations received by Weather Report =

This article displays the awards and nominations of the Jazz band Weather Report.

== Grammy Awards ==
The Grammy Awards are awarded annually by the National Academy of Recording Arts and Sciences of the United States. Weather Report won one Grammy from six nominations.

Year	Nominee / work	Award	Result
1972	I Sing The Body Electric	Best Jazz Instrumental Album	Nominated
1979	8:30	Best Jazz Fusion Performance	Won
1981	Night Passage	Best Jazz Fusion Performance	Nominated
1982	Weather Report	Best Jazz Fusion Performance	Nominated
1983	Procession	Best Jazz Fusion Performance	Nominated
1985	Sportin' Life	Best Jazz Fusion Performance	Nominated

== DownBeat Awards ==
Year	Nominee / work	Award	Result
1971	Weather Report	Jazz Combo of the Year	Won
1972	Weather Report	Jazz Combo of the Year	Won
1973	Weather Report	Jazz Combo of the Year	Won
1974	Mysterious Traveller	Jazz Album of the Year	Won
1974	Weather Report	Jazz Combo of the Year	Won
1975	Weather Report	Jazz Combo of the Year	Won
1975	Tale Spinnin'	Jazz Album of the Year	Won
1976	Weather Report	Jazz Combo of the Year	Won
1976	Black Market	Jazz Album of the Year	Won
1974	Weather Report	Jazz Combo of the Year	Won
1977	Heavy Weather	Jazz Album of the Year	Won
1977	"Weather Report"	Jazz Group of the Year	Won
1978	"Weather Report"	Jazz Group of the Year	Won
1983	"Weather Report"	Jazz Group of the Year	Won

== Other accolades ==
- Heavy Weather, 1977 Record of the Year, Jazz Forum magazine People's Poll
- Swing Journal Silver Disc Award
- Playboy Jazz Record and Jazz Band of the Year
- Record World Instrumental Group of the Year
- Cash Box Record of the Year
