= Live and Unreleased =

Live and Unreleased may refer to:

- Live and Unreleased, an EP by The Urge, 2000
- Live and Unreleased (album), by Weather Report, 2002
