= Havona =

Havona may refer to:

- Havona, a term in the Urantia Book
- "Havona", a song by Weather Report from their 1977 album Heavy Weather
