= The Legendary Live Tapes: 1978–1981 =

Live album by Weather Report
- Released: November 20, 2015
- Recorded: June 1, 1978; June 23 and 28, 1978; October 1978; November 1978; January 1980; June 24, 1980; November 14, 1980; June 1, 1980; June 1981
- Genre: Jazz fusion
- Length: Total: 247:35; Disc one: 61:16; Disc two: 60:45; Disc three: 63:02; Disc four: 62:32
- Label: Columbia; Sony Legacy
- Producer: Peter Erskine

Weather Report chronology
| Forecast: Tomorrow (2006) | The Legendary Live Tapes: 1978–1981 (2015) |

The Legendary Live Tapes: 1978–1981 is a four-CD live recording of Weather Report on Columbia, Sony, released on November 20, 2015. Discs one and three are quintet recordings from 1980 to 1981, while discs two and four are quartet recordings from 1978. Most of the music was recorded on analog tape by the band's then drummer (and producer of this live album) Peter Erskine and front of house mixing engineer Brian Risner. In the liner notes, Erskine provides insight into Weather Report's live performances and life on tour via a song by song discussion.

== Track listing ==
The Legendary Live Tapes: 1978–1981 track listing
Disc one
| Track title | Composer | Track length | Date recorded | Lineup | Venue |
|---|---|---|---|---|---|
| 1) "8:30" | Joe Zawinul | 2:19 | June, 1980 | Joe Zawinul, Jaco Pastorius | Festival Hall, Osaka, Japan |
| 2) "Sightseeing" | Wayne Shorter | 7:34 | June, 1980 | Joe Zawinul, Wayne Shorter, Jaco Pastorius, Peter Erskine, Robert Thomas Jr. | Festival Hall, Osaka, Japan |
| 3) "Brown Street" | Shorter, Zawinul | 11:17 | 1 June 1980 | Joe Zawinul, Wayne Shorter, Jaco Pastorius, Peter Erskine, Robert Thomas Jr. | Festival Hall, Osaka, Japan |
| 4) "The Orphan" | Zawinul | 1:51 | unknown | Joe Zawinul, Wayne Shorter, Jaco Pastorius, Peter Erskine, Robert Thomas Jr. | unknown |
| 5) "Forlorn" | Zawinul | 4:11 | June, 1980 | Joe Zawinul, Wayne Shorter, Jaco Pastorius, Peter Erskine, Robert Thomas Jr. | Festival Hall, Osaka, Japan |
| 6) "Three Views of a Secret" | Jaco Pastorius | 7:33 | 24 June 1980 | Joe Zawinul, Wayne Shorter, Jaco Pastorius, Peter Erskine, Robert Thomas Jr. | Koseinenkin Hall, Tokyo, Japan |
| 7) "Badia / Boogie Woogie Waltz" | Zawinul | 10:58 | 14 November 1980 | Joe Zawinul, Wayne Shorter, Jaco Pastorius, Peter Erskine, Robert Thomas Jr. | Hammersmith Odeon, London, UK |
| 8) "Wayne Solo" | Shorter | 7:34 | June, 1981 (1 July) | Wayne Shorter, Joe Zawinul | Eastman Theatre, Rochester, New York, USA |
| 9) "Jaco Solo (Osaka 1980)" | Pastorius | 7:59 | 1 June 1980 | Jaco Pastorius | Festival Hall, Osaka, Japan |
Disc two
| Track title | Composer | Track length | Date recorded | Lineup | Venue |
| 1) "Joe and Wayne Duet" | Duke Ellington | 8:40 | 28 June 1978 | Joe Zawinul, Wayne Shorter | Tokyo, Japan |
| 2) "Birdland" | Zawinul | 6:18 | 28 June 1978 | Joe Zawinul, Wayne Shorter, Jaco Pastorius, Peter Erskine | Tokyo, Japan |
| 3) "Peter's Solo ("Drum Solo")" | Peter Erskine | 4:43 | November, 1978 | Peter Erskine | either Long Beach, Santa Monica, Berkeley or Phoenix (24, 25, 26, 28 November) |
| 4) "A Remark You Made" | Zawinul | 7:34 | 28 June 1978 | Joe Zawinul, Wayne Shorter, Jaco Pastorius, Peter Erskine | Tokyo, Japan |
| 5) "Continuum / River People" | Pastorius | 12:22 | 1978 (10 November) | Joe Zawinul, Wayne Shorter, Jaco Pastorius, Peter Erskine | Tower Theater, Philadelphia, PA, USA |
| 6) "Gibraltar" | Zawinul | 21:08 | 23 June 1978 | Joe Zawinul, Wayne Shorter, Jaco Pastorius, Peter Erskine | Festival Hall, Osaka, Japan |
Disc three
| Track title | Composer | Track length | Date recorded | Lineup | Venue |
| 1) "Fast City" | Zawinul | 8:38 | June/July 1980 | Joe Zawinul, Wayne Shorter, Jaco Pastorius, Peter Erskine, Robert Thomas Jr. | Japan (Note: on Disc Three the information in the liner notes are different from the cover's Date/Location/Lineup credits, but the recordings make it clear that the liner notes are correct) |
| 2) "Madagascar" | Zawinul | 17:44 | 14 November 1980 | Joe Zawinul, Wayne Shorter, Jaco Pastorius, Peter Erskine, Robert Thomas Jr. | Hammersmith Odeon, London, UK |
| 3) "Night Passage" | Zawinul | 10:07 | 14 November 1980 | Joe Zawinul, Wayne Shorter, Jaco Pastorius, Peter Erskine, Robert Thomas Jr. | Hammersmith Odeon, London, UK |
| 4) "Dream Clock" | Zawinul | 9:37 | 14 November 1980 | Joe Zawinul, Wayne Shorter, Jaco Pastorius, Peter Erskine, Robert Thomas Jr. | Hammersmith Odeon, London, UK |
| 5) "Rockin' in Rhythm" | Ellington, Harry Carney, Irving Mills | 4:21 | 14 November 1980 | Joe Zawinul, Wayne Shorter, Jaco Pastorius, Peter Erskine, Robert Thomas Jr. | Hammersmith Odeon, London, UK |
| 6) "Port of Entry" | Shorter | 12:35 | January 1980 (17, 18, 19 or 20th) | Joe Zawinul, Wayne Shorter, Jaco Pastorius, Peter Erskine | (Note: the possible venues by date: January 17: Premier Theater, Norfolk, VA. January 18: Capitol Theatre, Passaic, NJ. January 19: Stanley Theater, Pittsburgh January 20: Tower Theater, Upper Darby, Pa.) |
Disc four
| Track title | Composer | Track length | Date recorded | Lineup | Venue |
| 1) "Elegant People" | Shorter | 9:18 | 23 June 1978 | Joe Zawinul, Wayne Shorter, Jaco Pastorius, Peter Erskine | Festival Hall, Osaka, Japan |
| 2) "Scarlet Woman" | Zawinul, Shorter, Alphonso Johnson | 11:53 | 23 June 1978 | Joe Zawinul, Wayne Shorter, Jaco Pastorius, Peter Erskine | Festival Hall, Osaka, Japan |
| 3) "Black Market" | Zawinul | 13:14 | 28 June 1978 | Joe Zawinul, Wayne Shorter, Jaco Pastorius, Peter Erskine | Koseinenkin Hall, Tokyo, Japan |
| 4) "Jaco Solo" | Pastorius | 8:19 | 23 June 1978 | Jaco Pastorius | Festival Hall, Osaka, Japan |
| 5) "Teen Town" | Pastorius | 8:59 | 1978 (29 October) | Joe Zawinul, Wayne Shorter, Jaco Pastorius, Peter Erskine | Reading, PA, USA (Astor Theater) |
| 6) "Peter's Drum Solo" | Erskine | 3:59 | 23 June 1978 | Peter Erskine | Festival Hall, Osaka, Japan |
| 7) "Directions" | Zawinul | 6:50 | 23 June 1978 | Joe Zawinul, Wayne Shorter, Jaco Pastorius, Peter Erskine | Festival Hall, Osaka, Japan |

== Personnel ==
- Joe Zawinul – keyboards; ARP Quadra synthesizer bass (Disc 1 / tracks 1, 3); acoustic piano (Disc 2 / track 1); "Chicken Neck" (Disc 1 / track 8)
- Wayne Shorter – saxophones
- Jaco Pastorius – fretless bass; drums (Disc 1 / track 1)
- Peter Erskine – drums, timpani (Disc 2 / track 3)
- Robert Thomas Jr. – hand drums (Discs 1 and 3)

Technical

- Peter Erskine – producer
- Tony Zawinul – executive producer
- Brian Risner – live engineer / editing
- Rich Breen – mastering
- Jim Lane – product direction
- Tara Master – project direction
- Jeff Gilligan – art direction, design
- Shigeru Uchiyama – cover photo

== Chart performance ==
Chart performance for The Legendary Live Tapes: 1978–1981
| Chart (2015) | Peak position |
|---|---|
| US Jazz Albums (Billboard) | 7 |
| US Top R&B/Hip-Hop Albums (Billboard) | 50 |
