= 8:30 =

Live album by Weather Report
- Released: August 1979
- Recorded: November 28, 1978 (and other dates in late 1978)
- Venue: Terrace Theater, Long Beach, California (plus "other locations")
- Genre: Jazz fusion
- Length: 80:58
- Label: ARC, Columbia
- Producer: Joe Zawinul, Jaco Pastorius

Weather Report chronology
Mr. Gone (1978)	8:30 (1979)	Night Passage (1980)

8:30 is the second live album from the jazz fusion group Weather Report, issued in 1979 by ARC/Columbia Records. The album rose to No. 3 on the Billboard Jazz Albums chart and No. 47 on the Billboard 200 chart. 8:30 also won a Grammy Award for Best Jazz Fusion Performance.

== Recording ==
The album takes its name from the band's habit of starting their performance at 8:30 PM. At the time of the tour, the band was a quartet and would take the stage continuously for around two and a half hours, each of the members taking a solo. Wayne Shorter sometimes plays percussion instead of saxophone on stage, and on one of the studio tracks, the calypso inspired "Brown Street", Joe Zawinul's son Erich plays percussion with Erskine and Pastorius.

Jaco Pastorius played a notable solo on "Slang" which started with an out-of-time rendition of "Dolores" by Wayne Shorter, then melded a multi-part bass solo using a rack-mounted MXR digital delay, leading into references to "Third Stone from the Sun" by Jimi Hendrix, "Portrait of Tracy" from his solo work, then "The Sound of Music". He finished playing his bass with its own strap.

According to Peter Erskine, the band had planned for the entire album to be live, but an engineer accidentally erased some of the material, prompting the band to go into the studio to record the fourth side.

== Release ==
The album was originally a double gatefold LP. In the US, the reissue on CD dropped "Scarlet Woman", as the album's running time narrowly exceeds the Red Book standard's maximum running time for a single CD. The album was released as a 2-CD set outside the US.

== Critical reception ==
Professional ratings
Review scores
Source	Rating
AllMusic	4.5/5 stars
Christgau's Record Guide	B+
Music Week	4/4 stars
The Penguin Guide to Jazz Recordings	3/4 stars
Record Mirror	3.5/5 stars
The Rolling Stone Jazz Record Guide	3/5 stars
DownBeat	4/5 stars

Reviewing in Christgau's Record Guide: Rock Albums of the Seventies (1981), Robert Christgau wrote: "The live double their more bemused admirers have waited for years is indeed Weather Report's most (if not first) useful album. But it also defines their limits. This is a band that runs the gamut from the catchy to the mysterioso. Joe Zawinul is the best sound effects man since Shadow Morton. And when he gives himself room, Wayne Shorter can blow." Bill Meredith of Allmusic declared, "Weather Report is generally regarded as the greatest jazz fusion band of all time, with the biggest jazz hit ("Birdland") from the best jazz fusion album (1977's Heavy Weather). But the group's studio mastery sometimes overshadows the fact that it was also a live juggernaut -- so don't overlook the outstanding live and studio album from 1979, 8:30." DownBeat reviewer Douglas Clark assigned the album 4 stars. He wrote, "Weather Report live at last! . . . Weather Report is a good live act. In the past few years their stage show has become downright flashy, and these performances evoke vivid images . . . This is wonderful music".

== Track listing ==
All tracks are written by Joe Zawinul, except where noted.

Side One
No.	Title	Length
1.	"Black Market"	9:47
2.	"Scarlet Woman" (Alphonso Johnson, Wayne Shorter, Zawinul)	8:42

Side Two
No.	Title	Length
1.	"Teen Town" (Jaco Pastorius)	6:03
2.	"A Remark You Made"	8:01
3.	"Slang" (Pastorius)	4:45
4.	"In a Silent Way"	2:47

Side Three
No.	Title	Length
1.	"Birdland"	7:13
2.	"Thanks for the Memory" (Leo Robin, Ralph Rainger)	3:33
3.	"Medley: Badia/Boogie Woogie Waltz"	9:32

Side Four
No.	Title	Length
1.	"8:30"	2:36
2.	"Brown Street" (Zawinul, Shorter)	8:34
3.	"The Orphan"	3:17
4.	"Sightseeing" (Shorter)	5:34

== Personnel ==
- Joe Zawinul – keyboards, ARP Quadra synthesizer bass, Korg Vocoder VC-10, Sequential Circuits Prophet-5, percussion
- Wayne Shorter – tenor saxophone, soprano saxophone
- Jaco Pastorius – fretless bass guitar, percussion; drums on "8:30" & "Brown Street"
- Peter Erskine – drums
- Erich Zawinul – percussion on "Brown Street"
- The West Los Angeles Christian Academy Children's Choir – vocals on "The Orphan"
