= Night Passage (album) =

Studio album with a live track by Weather Report
- Released: November 1980
- Recorded: June 29, 1980 (#8); July 12/13, 1980 (#1–7)
- Venues: Festival Hall, Osaka, Japan
- Studio: The Complex (Los Angeles)
- Genre: Jazz fusion
- Length: 48:05
- Label: ARC/Columbia
- Producers: Joe Zawinul, Jaco Pastorius

Weather Report chronology
8:30 (1979)	Night Passage (1980)	Weather Report (1982)

Night Passage is the ninth studio album by Weather Report, released in 1980. The tracks were recorded on July 12 and 13, 1980, at The Complex studios in Los Angeles (before a crowd of 250 people who can be heard on a couple of tracks), except for "Madagascar", recorded live at the Festival Hall, Osaka, Japan on June 29 of the same year.

The album introduces a new member to the band, percussionist Robert Thomas Jr. Night Passage dials back the elaborate production of some of Weather Report's earlier releases (most notably 1978's Mr. Gone). What is lost in overdubs is made up in solo improvisation in the classic jazz tradition.

Jaco Pastorius re-recorded the seventh track on the album, "Three Views of a Secret", for his second solo studio album, Word of Mouth (1981).

== Critical reception ==
Professional ratings
Review scores
Source	Rating
AllMusic	4/5 stars
Robert Christgau	C+
Jazz Journal	(favourable)
The Penguin Guide to Jazz Recordings	3/4 stars
The Rolling Stone Jazz Record Guide	4/5 stars

Richard S. Ginell of AllMusic favourably found that "All things being relative, this is Weather Report's straight-ahead album, where the elaborate production layers of the late-'70s gave way to sparer textures and more unadorned solo improvisation in the jazz tradition, electric instruments and all." Mark Gilbert of Jazz Journal praised the album saying, "With this album, Weather Report restore interest and credibility. Past efforts have been guilty of all manner of vapid redundancy, but this has rich content, imagination, fire and passion." Don Heckman of High Fidelity called Night Passage "one of the finest albums Weather Report has ever made".

Night Passage was Grammy-nominated in the category of Best Jazz Fusion Performance, Vocal or Instrumental.

== Track listing ==
No.	Title	Writer(s)	Length
1.	"Night Passage"	Joe Zawinul	6:30
2.	"Dream Clock"	Zawinul	6:26
3.	"Port of Entry"	Wayne Shorter	5:09
4.	"Forlorn"	Zawinul	3:55
5.	"Rockin' in Rhythm"	Duke Ellington, Irving Mills, Harry Carney	3:02
6.	"Fast City"	Zawinul	6:17
7.	"Three Views of a Secret"	Jaco Pastorius	5:50
8.	"Madagascar" (live)	Zawinul	10:56

== Personnel ==
Weather Report

- Joe Zawinul – keyboards and synthesizers
- Wayne Shorter – saxophones
- Jaco Pastorius – fretless bass
- Peter Erskine – drums
- Robert Thomas Jr. – percussion

Production

- Brian Risner – engineer
- George Massenburg – engineer
- Jerry Hudgins – engineer
- Joseph Futterer – art direction
- Richie Powell – art direction
- Nicholas DeVore III – cover photography
- Pete Turner – cover photography
