= Weather Report (1982 album) =

Studio album by Weather Report
- Released: January 1982
- Recorded: July – August 1981
- Studio: The Power Station (New York City); Sound Castle (Los Angeles, California)
- Genre: Jazz fusion
- Length: 42:13
- Label: ARC/Columbia
- Producer: Joe Zawinul, Jaco Pastorius, Wayne Shorter

Weather Report chronology
| Night Passage (1980) | Weather Report (1982) | Procession (1983) |

Weather Report is the tenth studio album by the American jazz fusion band Weather Report, released in January 1982. It is the final album featuring bass guitarist Jaco Pastorius and drummer Peter Erskine in the rhythm section.

== Background ==
The album features an increasingly heavy use of synthesized orchestration from Josef Zawinul, who had been becoming even more dominant within the band's sound. Zawinul was by now frequently doubling the basslines on Quadra synthesizer, something which annoyed and alienated Pastorius, who also had reservations about Zawinul's electronic big band sound (and who was himself increasingly working on a side career with a mostly acoustic band).

The vast majority of the album was composed by Zawinul, with the exception of one Wayne Shorter piece and one collectively composed item assembled from a group jam. The center piece of the album is the three part "N.Y.C." The three movement suite starts with 41st Parallel, a bouncing groove showing off Erskine's unique touch on the drums. The second movement, The Dance, is a more traditional swing feel, but with Zawinul's synthesizer orchestration heavily laid on top. The final movement, Crazy About Jazz, is a cordial ending.

== Critical reception ==
Professional ratings
Review scores
| Source | Rating |
|---|---|
| AllMusic | 3/5 stars |
| The Penguin Guide to Jazz Recordings | 3/4 stars |
| The Rolling Stone Jazz Record Guide | 3/5 stars |

Richard S. Ginell of AllMusic claimed, "Though the creativity level seems to be on medium-tank here, the band could still startle the ear with surprising new sounds, a supremely pithy Wayne Shorter statement, or fresh Third World spices. Their ability to swing is never in doubt."

== Track listing ==
Side one

1. "Volcano for Hire" (Josef Zawinul) – 5:25
2. "Current Affairs" (Zawinul) – 5:54
3. "N.Y.C." (Zawinul) – 10:11
  - Part One: "41st Parallel"
  - Part Two: "The Dance"
  - Part Three: "Crazy About Jazz"

Side two

1. "Dara Factor One" (Zawinul) – 5:25
2. "When It Was Now" (Wayne Shorter) – 4:45
3. "Speechless" (Zawinul) – 5:58
4. "Dara Factor Two" (Zawinul, Shorter, Jaco Pastorius, Peter Erskine, Robert Thomas Jr.) – 4:27

== Personnel ==
Weather Report

- Joe Zawinul – electric keyboards, piano, synthesized horn/strings/brass/woodwind, clay drum, drum computer, percussion, voice, front cover concept
- Wayne Shorter – tenor and soprano saxophones
- Jaco Pastorius – bass guitar, percussion, vocals
- Peter Erskine – drums, drum computer, claves
- Robert Thomas Jr. – percussion

Production

- Neil Dorfsman – engineer (at the Power Station)
- Brian Risner – engineer (recording, mixing)
- Mitch Gibson – assistant engineer (at Soundcastle studios)
- Joseph Futterer – art direction
- Richie Powell – art direction
- Don Dixon – cover artwork
