= Weather Report =

American jazz fusion band

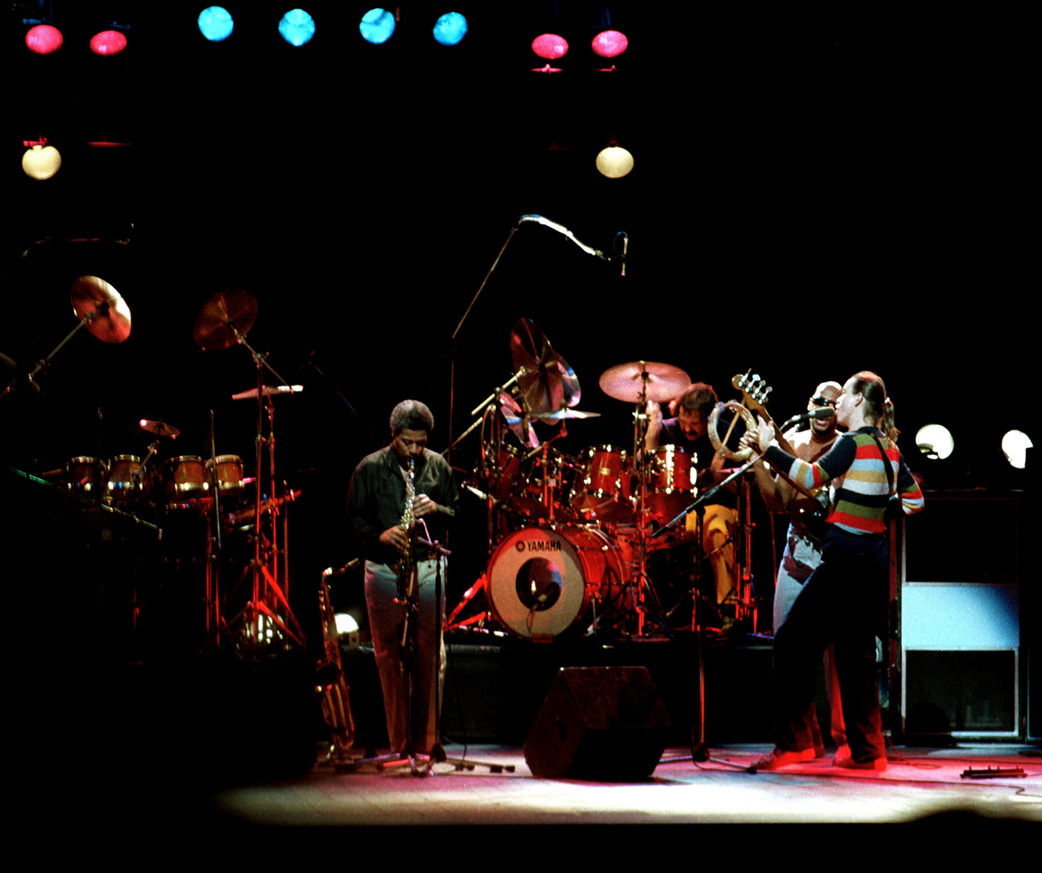
- Weather Report live June 11, 1981

Background information
- Origin: New York City, U.S.
- Genres: Jazz fusion; jazz-funk
- Years active: 1970–1986
- Labels: Columbia, ARC
- Past members: Joe Zawinul; Wayne Shorter; Jaco Pastorius; Miroslav Vitouš; Alphonse Mouzon; Don Alias; Airto Moreira; Muruga Booker; Dom Um Romão; Eric Gravatt; Greg Errico; Alphonso Johnson; Leon "Ndugu" Chancler; Narada Michael Walden; Chester Thompson; Alex Acuña; Manolo Badrena; Peter Erskine; Robert Thomas Jr. Omar Hakim; Victor Bailey; Mino Cinélu; Steve Gadd; Tony Williams; Andrew White

Weather Report was an American jazz fusion band active from 1970 to 1986. The band was founded in 1970 by Austrian keyboardist Joe Zawinul, American saxophonist Wayne Shorter, Czech bassist Miroslav Vitouš, American drummer Alphonse Mouzon and American percussionists Don Alias and Barbara Burton. The band was initially co-led by Zawinul and Shorter but as the 1970s progressed, Zawinul became the primary composer and creative director of the group. Other prominent members throughout the band's history included bassists Jaco Pastorius, Alphonso Johnson and Victor Bailey, drummers Chester Thompson, Peter Erskine and Omar Hakim, and percussionists Airto Moreira and Alex Acuña. A quintet of Zawinul and Shorter plus a bassist, a drummer, and a percussionist was the standard formation for Weather Report.

The band started as a free improvising group with avant-garde and experimental electronic leanings (pioneered by Zawinul); when Vitouš left Weather Report (due mostly to creative disagreements), Zawinul increasingly steered the band towards a funky, edgy sound incorporating elements of R&B and native musics from around the world. Zawinul used the latest developments in synthesizer technology, and he took advantage of a large variety of sounds and tone colors to make the band stand out. During the first half of their career, Weather Report were seen as one of the defining acts in modern jazz, winning the DownBeat "best album award" five times in a row.

Alongside bands such as Mahavishnu Orchestra, Return to Forever, and Herbie Hancock's Headhunters (all with members inspired by and partially responsible for the fusion-era work of Miles Davis), Weather Report is widely considered one of the defining bands of the jazz fusion genre.

== Musical style ==
Over their 16-year career, Weather Report explored various types of music, predominantly centered on jazz (initially the "free" variety), but also incorporating elements of art music, ethnic music, R&B, funk, and rock. While their work was categorized as "jazz fusion", the band members generally distanced themselves from that term.

From the start, Weather Report took the unusual approach of abandoning the traditional "soloist/accompaniment" demarcation of straight-ahead jazz and featured opportunities for continuous improvisation by every member of the band. That position remained consistent throughout the life of the band. From the point where Alphonso Johnson joined the band, individual solos became more prominent in concert, but were never allowed to overwhelm the collective approach. Initially, the band's music featured an improvisational method (similar to Miles Davis's Bitches Brew-period), but eventually that shifted to a more groove-oriented approach and catchier compositions (as epitomized by their 1977 hit single "Birdland").

Joe Zawinul's playing style was often dominated by quirky melodic improvisations (simultaneously bebop-, ethnic-, and pop-sounding) combined with sparse but rhythmic big-band chords or bass lines. Having originally made his name as a pioneering electric piano player, he went on to consistently develop the role of the synthesizer in jazz during his time with Weather Report. Working with companies such as ARP and Oberheim, Zawinul developed new ways of voicing and patching electronic tones for textures, ensemble roles (including emulations of traditional band instruments) and soloing. In Weather Report, he often employed a vocoder, as well as recorded sounds played (i.e., filtered and transposed) through a synthesizer, creating a very distinctive, often beautiful, synthesis of jazz harmonics and "noise" (which he referred to as "using all the sounds the world generates"). On some Weather Report tunes, however, Zawinul was criticized for allowing his synthesized arrangements to dominate the sound.

In the beginning let's say Weather Report was a joint thing. Then, after the second album there's no question about it, it became more and more my group. Wayne wanted it like that, but we were always 'partners in crime'. No Wayne, no Weather Report.

— Josef Zawinul on his gradual takeover of Weather Report

Wayne Shorter came to the group with a reputation as a dominant role as an instrumentalist, drawn from both his solo work and his contributions to Miles Davis' "second great quintet" during the 1960s. His choice not to follow the same approach with Weather Report led to some criticism of the group. During his time with Weather Report, Shorter was noted for generally playing saxophone with an economical, "listening" style. Rather than continually taking the lead, he generally added subtle harmonic, melodic, and/or rhythmic complexity by responding to other member's improvisations (although he could and did sometimes exercise a more frenetic style akin to that of John Coltrane or Michael Brecker). As a composer, he chose a more abstract, sometimes atonal and "free jazz" style of music, opposed to the sometimes flamboyant melodicism of the tunes written by Zawinul or Pastorius. Playing both tenor and soprano saxophones, Shorter continued to develop the role of the latter instrument in jazz, taking his cue from previous work by Coltrane, Sidney Bechet, Lucky Thompson, and Steve Lacy.

Weather Report maintained a consistent interest in a textured sound and developments in music technology and processing. Both Zawinul and original bassist Miroslav Vitouš experimented with electronic effects pedals (as generally used by rock guitarists) with Zawinul using them on electric piano and synthesizers and Vitouš on his upright bass (which he frequently bowed through distortion to create a second horn-like voice). The band's third bass player, Jaco Pastorius, popularized the use of fretless bass guitar, melodic bass soloing and extensive use of string harmonics, as well as consolidating the driving R&B pulse in the band's music (which had been brought in by his predecessor Alphonso Johnson).

With the exception of a brief quartet period between 1978 and 1979 (wherein other members could double on various percussion instruments), Weather Report's instrumentation always included both a drummer and a percussionist. For its first eight years of existence, the group had difficulty finding a permanent drummer, moving through about one drummer per year until Jaco Pastorius helped to recruit Peter Erskine in 1978. Peter Erskine and Omar Hakim were the only drummers who played with Weather Report for more than two years.

== History ==
=== 1970: Inception and formation ===
Joe Zawinul and Wayne Shorter had first met and become friends in 1959 while they were playing in Maynard Ferguson's Big Band. Zawinul went on to play with Cannonball Adderley's group in the 1960s, while Shorter joined Art Blakey's Jazz Messengers and then, in 1964, Miles Davis's second great quintet. During this decade, both men made names for themselves as being among the best composers in jazz.

Zawinul later joined Shorter in contributing to the initial fusion music recordings of Miles Davis, and both men were part of the studio groups that recorded the key Davis albums In a Silent Way (1969) and Bitches Brew (1970). Weather Report was initially formed to explore a more impressionistic and individualistic music (or, as Zawinul put it, "away from all that eight bars shit and then you go to the bridge...").

There is some dispute over how Weather Report initially formed. According to Zawinul, it began when he and Shorter recruited another Miles Davis associate, the classically trained Czech-born bass player Miroslav Vitouš, who had previously played with each of them separately (as well as with Herbie Mann, Bob Brookmeyer, Stan Getz, and Chick Corea). According to Vitouš himself, it was he and Shorter who actually founded Weather Report, with Shorter bringing in Zawinul afterwards. Whichever story is true, it was those three musicians – all composers – who formed the initial core of the project.

To complete the band, Zawinul, Shorter and Vitouš brought in McCoy Tyner's former drummer Alphonse Mouzon and began recording their debut album while looking for a full-time auxiliary percussionist. The initial recruits were session percussion player Don Alias and symphony orchestra percussionist Barbara Burton. During recording, Alias quarreled with Zawinul (allegedly due to Zawinul being too dictatorial over the percussion approach) and the innovative Brazilian percussionist Airto Moreira (yet another Davis alumnus) was brought in to complete the record. Guitarist John McLaughlin was also invited to join the group, but decided to pursue his solo career, instead.

=== 1971–1972: Avant-garde collective ===
Weather Report's debut album Weather Report featured a softer sound than would be the case in later years, predominantly using acoustic bass, with Shorter exclusively playing soprano saxophone. It built on the avant-garde experiments which Zawinul and Shorter had pioneered with Miles Davis on Bitches Brew live, including an avoidance of head-and-chorus composition in favor of continuous rhythm and movement. DownBeat magazine described the album as "music beyond category".

In 1972, Weather Report released its second album, I Sing the Body Electric. The first side featured new studio recordings, while the second side was taken from live recordings of a concert in Tokyo, featuring the full-band lineup of Zawinul, Shorter, Vitouš, Eric Gravatt, and Dom Um Romão (and later available in full as the 1972 Japan-only double album Live in Tokyo). The studio side used extended versions of the band including various guest performers, suggesting that Weather Report was not necessarily an integral jazz band, but might possibly work as an expandable project set up to realise the music of its three composers. The album also featured Zawinul's first use of a synthesizer (an instrument with which he would become synonymous within jazz) and of sound effects.

=== 1973: Move towards groove ===
On 1973's Sweetnighter, Weather Report began to abandon the primarily acoustic group improvisation format, and the band started to take a new direction. Primarily at Zawinul's instigation, Weather Report became more jazz funk- and groove-oriented, drawing more heavily on R&B influences and dense electric keyboard work while adding more structure to both the prewritten and the improvisational sections.

[Miroslav] loved funk, and he tried to play it, but he wasn't a funk player. It wasn't where he came from. He didn't connect up with how to go there. He could listen to it, talk about it, and he admired it, but that's not what came out of him, so that was something that held back where Joe wanted to go at the time I was with them. Melodically and rhythmically, Miroslav was great; what he did do, in terms of where I was coming from, was very unique. Miroslav was still playing acoustic, and it was an odd kind of a funk. It was very... interesting!

— Weather Report touring drummer Greg Errico on Miroslav Vitouš

Gravatt took his replacement in the studio sessions badly and quit the band at the end of recording, moving to Minneapolis to join the band Natural Life. Many years later, Zawinul paid tribute to Gravatt's skills and stated that he had been the finest of the band's "pure jazz" drummers as well as being "from the jazz side... my favorite of them all". With Gravatt gone and former drummer Herschel Dwellingham unavailable for touring, former Sly & the Family Stone drummer Greg Errico played on the Sweetnighter tour, but did not stay with the band afterwards.

At this point, Vitouš and Zawinul found themselves at creative loggerheads, since the former preferred Weather Report's original approach and the latter wished to continue further along the road to funk. Retrospectively, Zawinul accused Vitouš of being unable to play funk convincingly (something which Greg Errico corroborated) and claimed that he had not provided enough music for the band. Vitouš countered that he had in fact brought in compositions, but that Zawinul had been unable to play them. Vitouš has also accused Zawinul of having been "a first-class manipulator" primarily interested in commercial success. For his part, Zawinul would later recall Vitouš planning to concentrate on more bowed solos and getting the group to hire a second bassist to play the standard basslines, to which Zawinul's response was "why don't we get one bassist who can do all of that?" Zawinul claimed that "there was nothing disrespectful about it... we had to make this move. And history has proved us to have been right."

When Shorter sided with Zawinul, the original three-man partnership broke down acrimoniously and Vitouš left Weather Report, moving on to a solo career as composer and band leader. His final contribution to Weather Report was to play bass on a single track, which appeared on the band's 1974 album Mysterious Traveller ("American Tango", which he had co-written with Zawinul). Vitouš's departure marked the end of the first phase of Weather Report and the shift of overall creative dominance of the band to Josef Zawinul, although Shorter remained an integral, influential, and vital part of the project. Vitouš has subsequently accused both Zawinul and Shorter of having used foul play to edge him out of the band, to deny the scale of his contribution to Weather Report's history and creative approach, and to cheat him out of remuneration.

=== 1974–1975: Further into groove ===
Vitouš's replacement was the Philadelphian electric bass guitarist Alphonso Johnson (formerly a sideman for the pop-fusion player Chuck Mangione). Recruited by Shorter, Alphonso Johnson was a supple player more than capable of providing the funk element which Zawinul desired. He was also an early advocate of the Chapman Stick, which he can be heard playing on some of the live Weather Report recordings of the period.

According to Zawinul, new drummer Ishmael Wilburn apparently "lost heart" on tour (despite performing well in the studio). To shore up the music, the band hired another drummer, Darryl Brown, to play alongside him. At the end of the tour, both Wilburn and Brown left the band (as did Dom Um Romão) and Weather Report was, once again, drummerless.

For the next set of studio sessions, Weather Report added a new Brazilian percussionist (Alyrio Lima) and a new drummer, Leon "Ndugu" Chancler.

The new album, Tale Spinnin', was released in 1975. It was the first Weather Report album to feature a consistent rhythm section (rather than a varied set of drummers, percussionists, and bass players) since their debut. The album also made further strides in using technological improvements in synthesizers, even making use of the gigantic studio-based TONTO array.

During the same year, Shorter also recorded Native Dancer under his own name (with the Brazilian composer and vocalist Milton Nascimento). Tale Spinnin' won the DownBeat best album award for 1975 (the third Weather Report album to do so) and Native Dancer was the runner-up.

=== 1976: In transition ===
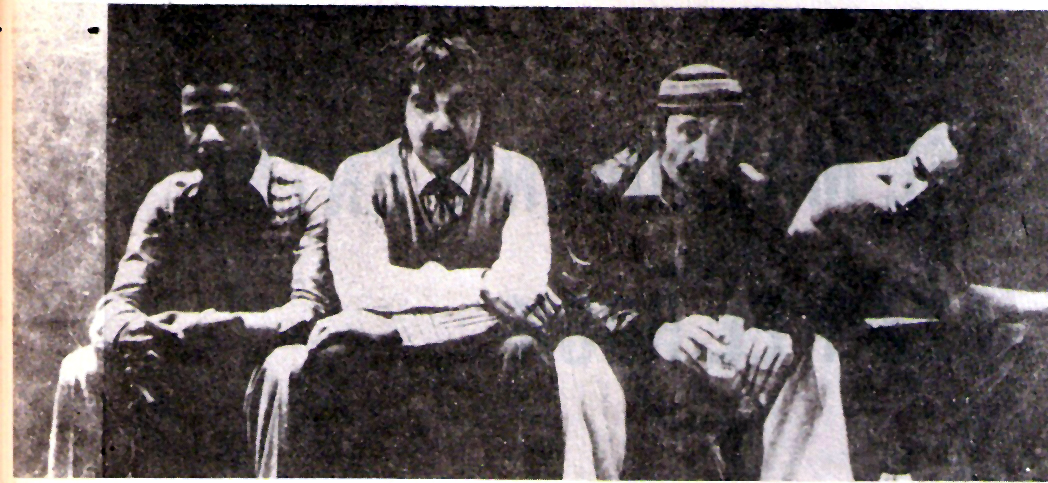
Weather Report in Argentina. L to R: Shorter, Erskine, Zawinul, and Pastorius

1976's Black Market album was perhaps the most rock-oriented work which the group had produced to date. Weather Report's music had evolved further from open-ended funk jams into more melody-oriented, concise forms, which also offered a greater mass-market appeal. Zawinul further consolidated his use of keyboard synthesizers, while Shorter experimented with an early form of wind synthesizer, the Lyricon.

However, the album was recorded during yet another period of change for the group, with multiple personnel shuffles. Although Alyrio Lima played percussion on one track, he was replaced during the sessions by Don Alias (his first appearance with the group since the debut album) and by Alex Acuña (a Peruvian drummer and conga player based in Las Vegas, who had played with Elvis Presley and Ike Turner, among others). Alphonso Johnson was also worn out from the strain put on the rhythm by the band's frequent changes of drummer. During a break in activity halfway through the recording of Black Market, Johnson opted to leave Weather Report to play with the Billy Cobham/George Duke Band (which featured a young John Scofield on guitar).

Prior to his departure, Johnson played on all but two of the new album's tracks. His replacement was Jaco Pastorius, a virtuoso fretless bass guitarist from Florida, who had been in touch with Zawinul for several years and who came in to play on "Cannonball" and his own composition "Barbary Coast". Zawinul and Shorter had assumed that new drummer Chester Thompson would be departing alongside his friend Johnson, and for the second set of sessions, they replaced him (on Pastorius' recommendation) with the former Mahavishnu Orchestra drummer Narada Michael Walden. Although Walden played on several album tracks, he ultimately proved unsuitable. Thompson returned for the final Black Market sessions, but left again after failing to gel as a rhythm section with Pastorius (whose style was much busier than that of Johnson). Thompson subsequently joined Genesis as their touring drummer.

Black Market continued Weather Report's ongoing run of success, selling well and being the fourth of the band's albums to win the album of the year award from DownBeat magazine. For the subsequent tour, Alex Acuña moved from percussion to the drum kit, and Don Alias was replaced by the young Puerto Rican percussionist Manolo Badrena, who had previously played with various Latin rock bands and with Art Blakey. The band made a very well-received appearance in July at the Montreux Jazz Festival 1976, which was filmed for future release.

=== 1977–1979: Jazz-rock stars ===
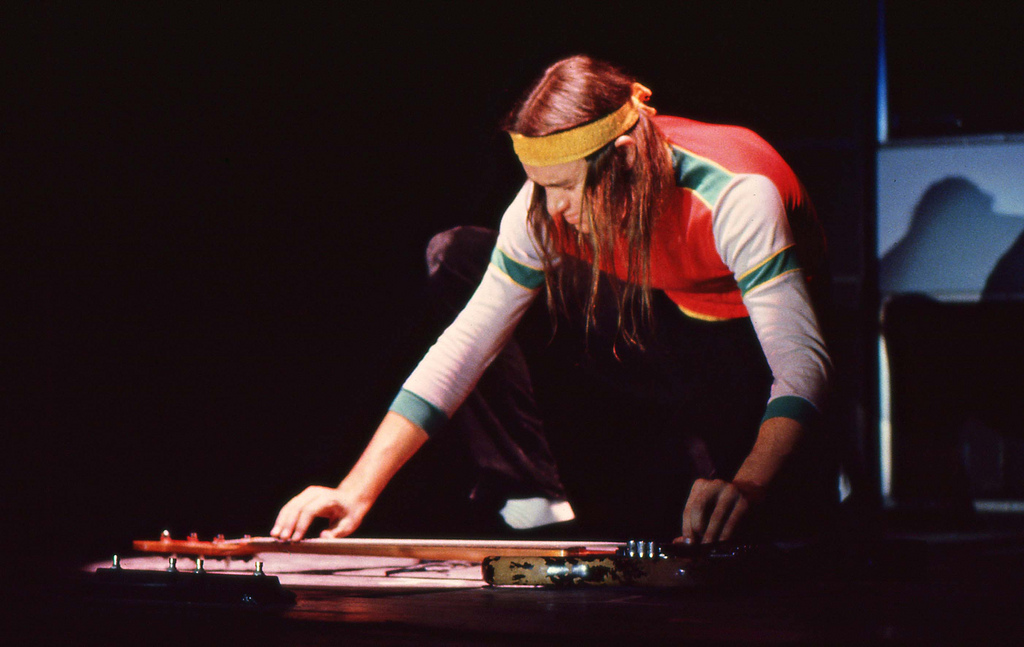
Pastorius, reaching to accentuate his bass guitar sound with harmonics

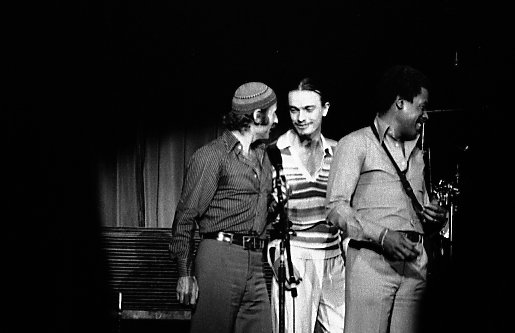
L-R: Zawinul, Pastorius, Shorter

The band's next album was 1977's acclaimed Heavy Weather, which proved to be the band's most successful recording in terms of sales, while still retaining wide critical acclaim. It included the band's biggest hit, the propulsive and danceable "Birdland" (highlighting Pastorius' singing bass lines and Zawinul's synthesized ensemble brass), which became a pop hit and later became a jazz standard. Weather Report appeared on the Burt Sugarman-produced series The Midnight Special, performing both "Birdland" and "Teen Town". Heavy Weather continued Weather Report's record of awards, including their last DownBeat Album of the Year award.

During this period, Pastorius' strong professional connection with Joni Mitchell (for whom he played bass throughout the latter half of the 1970s) led to another musical connection. Over the next few years, Mitchell hired the Weather Report line-up en masse (although without Zawinul in each case) to play on her studio albums Don Juan's Reckless Daughter (1977) and Mingus (1979).

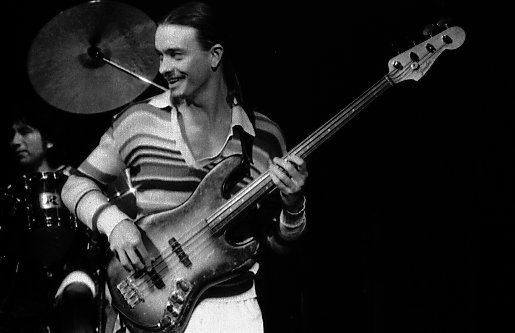
Jaco Pastorius, with bass guitar in Toronto, November 1977

During August 1978 the band joined Maurice White's vanity label ARC at Columbia. At the time they were once again without either a full-time drummer and percussionist, with Alex Acuña having returned to Las Vegas for a career as a studio musician and Manolo Badrena having been fired for "non-musical reasons". Shorter had been focusing most of his attention and compositional ideas into his solo work, while Zawinul was sketching out ideas for a solo album of his own, which involved moving away from a raw group sound in favor of constructing a far more orchestrated and experimental studio-based recording with multiple overdubs. However, Weather Report's contract and work schedule required another album, so Zawinul's solo work was absorbed into what became Weather Report's eighth album, Mr. Gone (1978).

The studio sessions made use of a variety of drummers – Pastorius played the kit on two tracks and further contributions came from Tony Williams, Steve Gadd, and Peter Erskine (the latter an ex-Stan Kenton/Maynard Ferguson drummer recruited to the project by Pastorius). Erskine became a full member of the band for the next tour and remained with Weather Report until 1982. The album also featured guest appearances from Deniece Williams and Earth Wind and Fire leader Maurice White. The album rose to No. 1 on the Billboard Jazz Albums chart.

Notoriously, Mr. Gone (1978) received only a one-star review rating from DownBeat after a string of group releases which had all pulled a five-star rating. The group arranged for a rebuttal interview with the magazine to defend their efforts. Zawinul and Pastorius were uncompromising in their contributions to the interview, Shorter more philosophical, and Erskine the most reticent of the four.

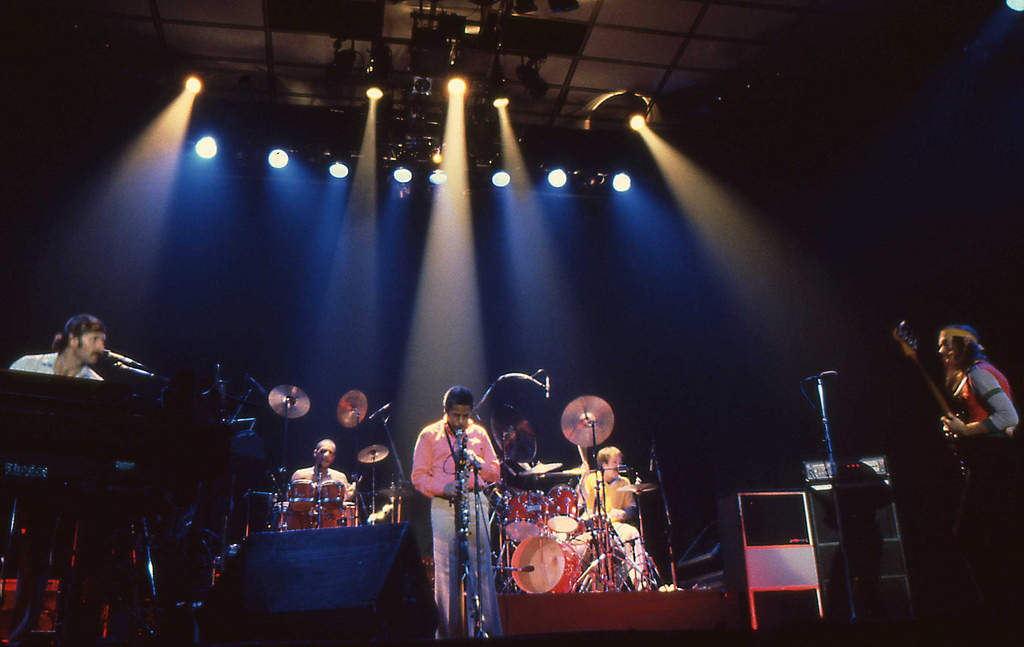
Weather Report performing in Amsterdam in 1980

By the late '70s, Weather Report was a quartet of Zawinul, Shorter, Pastorius, and Erskine, and (for the first time) had dispensed with the auxiliary percussionist role, which had been integral since the band's inception. Instead, all four members doubled on percussion at various points in live performances. Zawinul commented that this sleeker, less crowded sound provided more listening range and made the music less chaotic now that the band were focusing more on melody and harmony.

The larger scale and multimedia staging of the band's tours (complete with stagehands, laser and film projections) began to take on the kind of rock-star proportions mostly unknown in jazz circles. The 1979 double live album 8:30 (which won that year's Best Jazz Fusion Performance) was recorded on the Mr. Gone tour and captured the direct power and energy of this lineup of Weather Report. Zawinul later described this lineup as "one of the greatest bands of all time! That band was a hummer!"

Between March 2 and 4, 1979, Weather Report traveled to Havana, Cuba, to participate in the historic Havana Jam festival, a break in mutual Cuban/American political hostilities, which had American artists such as Stephen Stills, the CBS Jazz All-Stars, Bonnie Bramlett, Kris Kristofferson, Rita Coolidge, and Billy Joel play alongside Cuban artists such as Irakere, Pacho Alonso, Tata Güines, and Orquesta Aragón. Another featured performance was by the Trio of Doom (a short-lived teaming of Pastorius with John McLaughlin and Tony Williams). Weather Report's performance featured in Havana Jam '79, Ernesto Juan Castellanos' documentary celebrating the event.

=== 1980–1982: A tighter arrangement ===
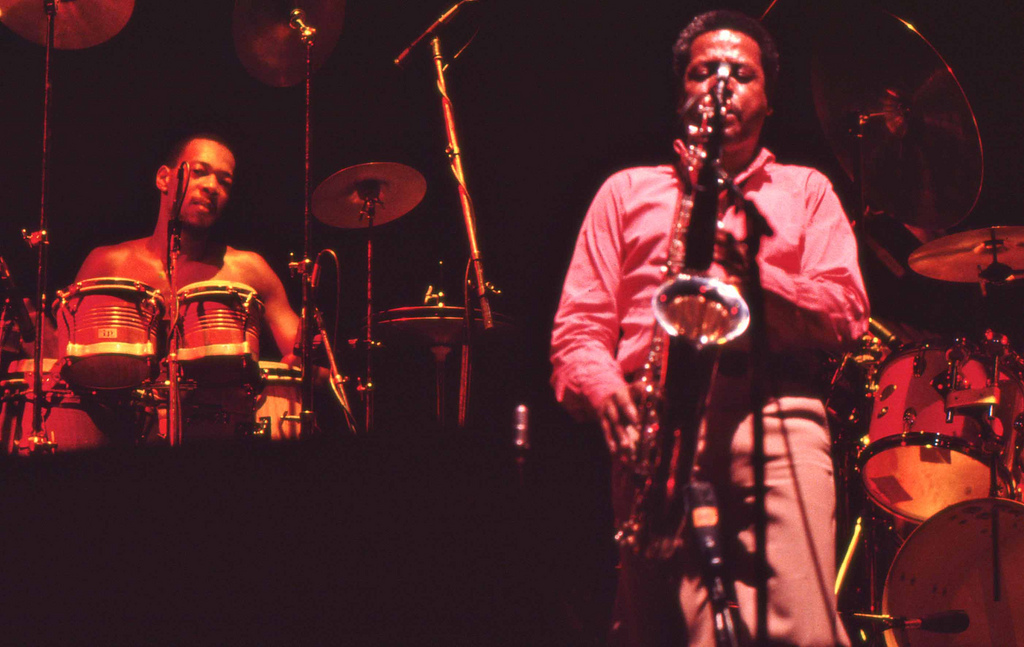
Drummer Thomas, left, and Shorter, performing in Amsterdam, in 1980

At the beginning of 1980, Pastorius recruited hand-drummer Robert Thomas Jr. (a fellow Floridan, with whom he had jammed previously) into the band. Thomas featured on the 1980 album Night Passage. A tighter and more traditional recording than previous releases, the record featured a more prominent role for Shorter, a strong element of bebop, and a nod to jazz's golden age via a high-speed cover of Duke Ellington's "Rockin' in Rhythm" (showing off Zawinul's pioneering and ever-increasing ability to create synthetic big-band sounds on his synthesizers).

By now, Pastorius was displaying signs of the mental instability and substance abuse problems that ultimately wrecked his career; the close relationship he'd previously shared with Zawinul was becoming strained as Zawinul lost patience with Pastorius' showmanship onstage (beginning to feel that it detracted from the music). Towards the end of the year, Pastorius began working on his long-delayed second solo album (Word of Mouth) (1981) in New York, while Zawinul worked on new Weather Report material in California.

Weather Report's next album Weather Report (1982) (their second eponymous release, following their 1971 debut) was recorded in 1981, although it was not released for another year. Zawinul's dominance as instrumentalist and composer (as well as group director) was even more pronounced on this album. Increasingly, the band's music was written out rather than improvised. At the same time, Pastorius was spending more of his creative attention on his Word of Mouth project: his only writing for the Weather Report album was his contribution to a single group-composed piece. Shorter (who only contributed one composition to the 1982 album, beyond group-written work) was already taking a less active approach. He later commented, philosophically, "For a long time in Weather Report, I abstained. I elected not to do things."

Erskine's own commitment to Word of Mouth (and his summer commitment to Steps Ahead) meant that his part also needed to be replaced; at the same time, Robert Thomas Jr. left the band. Reduced to a duo, and with tour commitments looming, Zawinul and Shorter were obliged to quickly assemble a new band.

=== 1982–1985: A new band ===
On the recommendation of Michał Urbaniak, Zawinul and Shorter recruited 23-year-old drummer Omar Hakim, a talented session player and multi-instrumentalist, who had played with a variety of musicians including Mike Mainieri, David Bowie, and Carly Simon. Hakim was immediately entrusted with recruiting the rest of the new lineup. Having failed to secure Marcus Miller as bass guitarist, he selected Victor Bailey (a recent graduate from the Berklee College of Music, with whom Hakim had played while backing Miriam Makeba). Hakim also recruited percussion/concertina player José Rossy, with whom he had worked in Labelle.

The new Weather Report went straight onto tour. The music developed on tour was later recorded for the 1983 album Procession, which showed the band beginning to make something of a return to the "world music" approach which it had pioneered in the mid-1970s, and featured a cameo appearance from The Manhattan Transfer.

Continuing with the same lineup, Weather Report recorded the Domino Theory album in 1984, with Hakim stepping into Jaco Pastorius' old role as Zawinul's co-producer. The album was Weather Report's first album to employ drum machines and samplers (the Emulator), deepening the band's involvement with cutting-edge music technology, and also featured a guest vocal from Carl Anderson.

Percussionist and singer Mino Cinélu replaced Rossy in the spring of 1984 and appeared on the band's video release Live in Japan (reissued on DVD in 2007). The same lineup played on 1985's Sportin' Life album, which included a cover of Marvin Gaye's "What's Going On" and appearances by singers Bobby McFerrin and Carl Anderson. In keeping with Zawinul's technological curiosity, the album heralded the arrival of MIDI, which allowed him to rapidly and inexpensively write, demonstrate, and record music via a set of synthesizers.

=== 1986: Final split ===
Both Zawinul and Shorter were beginning to realise that the refreshing nature of other projects was more satisfying than Weather Report work, and both generally felt that the band had run its course.

In February 1986, the San Diego Union-Tribune announced that Shorter had left the band to concentrate on solo work. Having reluctantly agreed with Shorter that he would no longer use the band name, Zawinul then ended Weather Report. The final album under the Weather Report name, This is This!, was released in June 1986 and fulfilled the band's contract with Columbia Records. Two of its tracks featured guitar work from Carlos Santana, and it also marked the return of Peter Erskine on drums, with Hakim only appearing on one track.

=== 1986–present: After Weather Report ===
Having split the band, Zawinul promptly attempted to reform it – after a fashion – as Weather Update. For this project, he reunited with recent Weather Report alumni Victor Bailey, Mino Cinélu, and Peter Erskine, but replaced Shorter with guitarist John Scofield. This lineup was short-lived, with Los Angeles session guitarist Steve Khan and former Weather Report percussionist Robert Thomas Jr. replacing Scofield and Cinélu prior to live appearances. Weather Update toured in 1986 and 1987 before Zawinul dissolved the band. From 1988 onwards, Zawinul went on to enjoy a successful nineteen-year career leading the world music/jazz ensemble The Zawinul Syndicate (which has continued, following Zawinul's death, as The Syndicate).

Rather than form another collective band, Wayne Shorter concentrated on his solo career and on work as a bandleader, which continued until his death on March 2, 2023.

In spite of the band's enduring popularity, a Weather Report reunion never occurred. The nearest that the band ever came to reuniting was when Zawinul and Shorter both played live with Miles Davis on July 10, 1991, in Paris (the only time when Zawinul is known to have shared a live stage with Davis). A projected mid-1990s reunion CD for Verve never materialized; according to Zawinul, disappointing sales for Shorter's 1995 CD High Life may have played a part in ending the idea.

Six of the band's members have since died. Zawinul himself died on September 11, 2007, in Vienna from skin cancer (Merkel cell carcinoma). He was predeceased by mid-period bass player Jaco Pastorius, who died on September 21, 1987, following a fatal beating in his hometown of Fort Lauderdale, Florida. Pastorius' successor on bass guitar, Victor Bailey, died on November 11, 2016 (apparently from complications from Charcot-Marie-Tooth disease and amyotrophic lateral sclerosis). Alphonse Mouzon, the first drummer, died on December 25, 2016, from cardiac arrest after neuroendocrine cancer. Dom Um Romão, the group's percussionist from 1971 to 1974, died in 2005 aged 79. Wayne Shorter died on March 2, 2023, at the age of 89.

== Grammy Awards ==
The Grammy Awards are awarded annually by the National Academy of Recording Arts and Sciences of the United States. Weather Report has won one Grammy from six nominations.

Year	Nominee / work	Award	Result
1972	"I Sing The Body Electric"	Best Jazz Performance by a Group	Nominated
1979	"8:30"	Best Jazz Fusion Performance, Vocal or Instrumental	Won
1981	"Night Passage"	Best Jazz Fusion Performance, Vocal or Instrumental	Nominated
1982	"Weather Report"	Best Jazz Fusion Performance, Vocal or Instrumental	Nominated
1983	"Procession"	Best Jazz Fusion Performance, Vocal or Instrumental	Nominated
1985	"Sportin' Life"	Best Jazz Fusion Performance, Vocal or Instrumental	Nominated

== Members ==
Image	Name	Years active	Instruments	Release contributions
	Joe Zawinul	1970–1987 (died 2007)	electric and acoustic pianos; synthesizer; organ; percussion; guitar	all releases
	Wayne Shorter	1970–1986 (died 2023)	soprano and tenor saxophones; lyricon; percussion	all releases
	Miroslav Vitouš	1970–1973	acoustic and electric basses	all releases from Weather Report (1971) to Mysterious Traveller (1974)
	Alphonse Mouzon	1970–1972 (died 2016)	drums; vocals	Weather Report (1971)
	Barbara Burton	1970–1971	percussion	Weather Report (1971)
	Don Alias	1970–1971; 1975–1977 (died 2006)	percussion	Weather Report (1971); Black Market (1976)
	Airto Moreira	1971	percussion	Weather Report (1971)
	Dom Um Romão	1971–1974 (died 2005)	percussion	all releases from Live in Tokyo (1972) to Mysterious Traveller (1974)
	Eric Gravatt	1972–1973	drums	Live in Tokyo (1972); I Sing the Body Electric (1972); Sweetnighter (1973)
	Andrew White	1972–1973 (died 2020)	English horn; electric bass	I Sing the Body Electric (1972); Sweetnighter (1973)
	Herschel Dwellingham	1972–1973	drums	Sweetnighter (1973)
	Muruga Booker	1972–1973	percussion	Sweetnighter (1973)
	Greg Errico	1973	drums	
	Alphonso Johnson	1973–1976	electric bass; chapman stick	Mysterious Traveller (1974); Tale Spinnin' (1975); Black Market (1976); Live and Unreleased (2002)
	Ishmael Wilburn	1973–1974	drums	Mysterious Traveller (1974)
	Darryl Brown	1973–1974	drums	
	Alyrio Lima	1974–1975	percussion	Tale Spinnin' (1975)
	Chuck Bazemore	1974 (died 2022)	drums	
	Leon "Ndugu" Chancler	1974–1975 (died 2018)	drums	Tale Spinnin' (1975)
	Chester Thompson	1975–1976; 1976	drums	Black Market (1976); Live and Unreleased (2002)
	Alex Acuña	1975–1978	drums; percussion	Black Market (1976); Heavy Weather (1977); Live and Unreleased (2002)
	Jaco Pastorius	1976–1982 (died 1987)	electric bass; drums; percussion	all releases from Black Market (1976) to Weather Report (1982); Live and Unreleased (2002); The Legendary Live Tapes: 1978–1981 (2015)
	Narada Michael Walden	1976	drums	Black Market (1976)
	Manolo Badrena	1976–1978	percussion; vocals	Heavy Weather (1977); Live and Unreleased (2002)
	Peter Erskine	1978–1982; 1986–1987	drums; percussion	all releases from Mr. Gone (1978) to Weather Report (1982); This is This! (1986); Live and Unreleased (2002); The Legendary Live Tapes: 1978–1981 (2015)
	Robert Thomas Jr.	1980–1982; 1986–1987	percussion	Night Passage (1980); Weather Report (1982); Live and Unreleased (2002); The Legendary Live Tapes: 1978–1981 (2015)
	Victor Bailey	1982–1987 (died 2016)	electric bass	all releases from Procession (1983) to This Is This (1986); Live and Unreleased (2002)
	Omar Hakim	1982–1986	drums; guitar; vocals	all releases from Procession (1983) to This Is This (1986); Live and Unreleased (2002)
	José Rossy	1982–1984	percussion; concertina	Procession (1983); Domino Theory (1984); Live and Unreleased (2002)
	Mino Cinélu	1984–1986	percussion; vocals; acoustic guitar	Sportin' Life (1985); This Is This (1986)
	John Scofield	1986	electric guitar	none
	Steve Khan	1986–1987	electric guitar	none

=== Lineups ===
Late 1970 – Early 1971	Early 1971	Early 1971 – Mid 1971	Mid 1971 – Early 1972
Wayne Shorter – soprano saxophone; Joe Zawinul – electric and acoustic pianos; Miroslav Vitouš – acoustic and electric basses; Alphonse Mouzon – drums, vocals; Don Alias – percussion; Barbara Burton – percussion	Wayne Shorter – soprano saxophone; Joe Zawinul – electric and acoustic pianos; Miroslav Vitouš – acoustic and electric basses; Alphonse Mouzon – drums, vocals; Barbara Burton – percussion; Airto Moreira – percussion	Wayne Shorter – soprano saxophone; Joe Zawinul – electric and acoustic pianos; Miroslav Vitouš – acoustic and electric basses; Alphonse Mouzon – drums, vocals; Barbara Burton – percussion	Wayne Shorter – soprano saxophone; Joe Zawinul – electric and acoustic pianos; Miroslav Vitouš – acoustic and electric basses; Alphonse Mouzon – drums, vocals; Dom Um Romão – percussion
Early 1972 – End 1972	End 1972 – Early 1973	Early 1973 – End 1973	End 1973 – Mid 1973
Wayne Shorter – soprano and tenor saxophones; Joe Zawinul – electric and acoustic pianos, synthesizer; Miroslav Vitouš – acoustic and electric basses; Eric Gravatt – drums; Dom Um Romão – percussion	Wayne Shorter – soprano and tenor saxophones; Joe Zawinul – electric and acoustic pianos, synthesizer; Miroslav Vitouš – acoustic and electric basses; Andrew White – English horn, electric bass; Eric Gravatt – drums; Herschel Dwellingham – drums; Dom Um Romão – percussion; Muruga Booker – percussion	Wayne Shorter – soprano and tenor saxophones; Joe Zawinul – electric and acoustic pianos, synthesizer; Miroslav Vitouš – acoustic and electric basses; Greg Errico – drums; Dom Um Romão – percussion	Wayne Shorter – soprano and tenor saxophones; Joe Zawinul – electric and acoustic pianos, synthesizer, organ, percussion, guitar; Alphonso Johnson – electric bass, chapman stick; Ishmael Wilburn – drums; Dom Um Romão – percussion
Mid 1973 – Mid 1974	Mid 1974 – End 1974	End 1974 – Mid 1975	Mid 1975 – End 1975
Wayne Shorter – soprano and tenor saxophones; Joe Zawinul – electric and acoustic pianos, synthesizer, organ, percussion, guitar; Alphonso Johnson – electric bass, chapman stick; Ishmael Wilburn – drums; Darryl Brown – drums; Dom Um Romão – percussion	Wayne Shorter – soprano and tenor saxophones; Joe Zawinul – electric and acoustic pianos, synthesizer, organ, percussion, guitar; Alphonso Johnson – electric bass, chapman stick; Chuck Bazemore – drums; Alyrio Lima – percussion	Wayne Shorter – soprano and tenor saxophones; Joe Zawinul – electric and acoustic pianos, synthesizer, organ, percussion, guitar; Alphonso Johnson – electric bass, chapman stick; Leon "Ndugu" Chancler – drums; Alyrio Lima – percussion	Wayne Shorter – soprano and tenor saxophones; Joe Zawinul – electric and acoustic pianos, synthesizer, organ, percussion, guitar; Alphonso Johnson – electric bass, chapman stick; Chester Thompson – drums; Alyrio Lima – percussion
End 1975 – Start 1976	Start 1976	Start 1976 – Early 1977	Early 1977 – Spring 1978
Wayne Shorter – soprano and tenor saxophones, lyricon; Joe Zawinul – electric and acoustic pianos, synthesizer, organ, percussion, guitar; Alphonso Johnson – electric bass, chapman stick; Chester Thompson – drums; Don Alias – percussion; Alex Acuña – percussion	Wayne Shorter – soprano and tenor saxophones, lyricon; Joe Zawinul – electric and acoustic pianos, synthesizer, organ, percussion, guitar; Jaco Pastorius – electric bass; Narada Michael Walden – drums; Don Alias – percussion; Alex Acuña – percussion	Wayne Shorter – soprano and tenor saxophones, lyricon; Joe Zawinul – electric and acoustic pianos, synthesizer, organ, percussion, guitar; Jaco Pastorius – electric bass; Chester Thompson – drums; Don Alias – percussion; Alex Acuña – percussion	Wayne Shorter – soprano and tenor saxophones, lyricon; Joe Zawinul – electric and acoustic pianos, synthesizer, organ, percussion, guitar; Jaco Pastorius – electric bass, drums, percussion; Alex Acuña – drums, percussion; Manolo Badrena – percussion, vocals
Spring 1978 – Early 1980	Early 1980 – Start 1982	Start 1982 – Spring 1984	Spring 1984 – Early 1986
Wayne Shorter – soprano and tenor saxophones, lyricon, percussion; Joe Zawinul – electric and acoustic pianos, synthesizer, organ, percussion, guitar; Jaco Pastorius – electric bass, drums, percussion; Peter Erskine – drums, percussion	Wayne Shorter – soprano and tenor saxophones, lyricon, percussion; Joe Zawinul – electric and acoustic pianos, synthesizer, organ, percussion, guitar; Jaco Pastorius – electric bass, drums, percussion; Peter Erskine – drums, percussion; Robert Thomas Jr. – percussion	Wayne Shorter – soprano and tenor saxophones, lyricon, percussion; Joe Zawinul – electric and acoustic pianos, synthesizer, organ, percussion, guitar; Victor Bailey – electric bass; Omar Hakim – drums, percussion, guitar; José Rossy – percussion, concertina	Wayne Shorter – soprano and tenor saxophones, lyricon, percussion; Joe Zawinul – electric and acoustic pianos, synthesizer, organ, percussion, guitar; Victor Bailey – electric bass; Omar Hakim – drums, percussion, guitar; Mino Cinélu – percussion, vocals, acoustic guitar
Early 1986 – February 1986	February 1986 – 1986 (As Weather Update)	1986 – 1987 (as Weather Update)
Wayne Shorter – soprano and tenor saxophones, lyricon, percussion; Joe Zawinul – electric and acoustic pianos, synthesizer, percussion; Victor Bailey – electric bass; Omar Hakim – drums, percussion, guitar; Peter Erskine – drums; Mino Cinélu – percussion, vocals, acoustic guitar	Joe Zawinul – electric and acoustic pianos, synthesizer, percussion; John Scofield – electric guitar; Victor Bailey – electric bass; Peter Erskine – drums; Mino Cinélu – percussion, vocals, acoustic guitar	Joe Zawinul – electric and acoustic pianos, synthesizer, percussion; Steve Khan – electric guitar; Victor Bailey – electric bass; Peter Erskine – drums; Robert Thomas Jr. – percussion

== Discography ==
=== Studio albums ===
Year	Album
1971	Weather Report
1972	I Sing the Body Electric
1973	Sweetnighter
1974	Mysterious Traveller
1975	Tale Spinnin'
1976	Black Market
1977	Heavy Weather
1978	Mr. Gone
1980	Night Passage
1982	Weather Report
1983	Procession
1984	Domino Theory
1985	Sportin' Life
1986	This Is This!

== Releases since the band's breakup ==
A "post band" Weather Report double CD called Live and Unreleased was made available in 2002, featuring vintage live recordings made during the late 1970s/early 1980s with various personnel. In September 2006, Columbia/Legacy released a Weather Report boxed set, Forecast: Tomorrow. It includes three CDs of mostly previously released material (from 1970 to 1985, excluding This is This!) and a DVD of the entire September 28, 1978, performance (with Erskine and Pastorius) in Offenbach, Germany, not previously available. A DVD video of the 1976 Montreux Jazz Festival performance (featuring the Heavy Weather lineup of Pastorius, Acuna, and Badrena) has become available, as well. Columbia/Legacy have also re-released the 1984 Live in Japan concert on DVD.

In 2011, the Zawinul estate, in conjunction with an independent label, released a 40th-anniversary commemorative trilogy of previously unavailable Weather Report live shows: In March Live in Berlin 1975 was released both on vinyl and as a CD/DVD set; in June the Live in Offenbach 1978 DVD was re-released together with a previously unavailable double CD of the complete show; in October Live in Cologne 1983 was released as both DVD and double CD.
