= Weather Report (1971 album) =

Studio album by Weather Report
- Released: May 12, 1971
- Recorded: February 16–18, 22 & March 17, 1971
- Genre: Jazz fusion
- Length: 40:05
- Label: Columbia
- Producer: Shoviza Productions

Weather Report chronology
Weather Report (1971)	Live in Tokyo (1972)

Joe Zawinul chronology
Zawinul (1971)	Weather Report (1971)	Live in Tokyo (1972)

Professional ratings
Review scores
Source	Rating
AllMusic	5/5 stars
Christgau's Record Guide	B
The Penguin Guide to Jazz Recordings	3/4 stars
The Rolling Stone Jazz Record Guide	3/5 stars
Sputnikmusic	4/5

Weather Report is the debut studio album by American jazz fusion band Weather Report, released on May 12, 1971, by Columbia Records. The album was reissued by Sony and digitally remastered by Vic Anesini in November 1991 at Sony Music Studios in New York City.

== Liner notes ==
Writing on the back sleeve of the album, Clive Davis, the then president of Columbia Records, opines: "There have always been two kinds of musicians-those who create and those who imitate. Weather Report creates. It is that rare thing in music, an original […] Together these gifted young musicians have created Weather Report, a soundtrack for the mind, the imagination, for opening up heads and hearts."

== Critical reception ==
Reviewing in Christgau's Record Guide: Rock Albums of the Seventies (1981), Robert Christgau called the album "In a Silent Way played mostly for atmosphere", and went on to write: "The Milesian demi-jazz of side two sounds pretty finky (no misprint intended), but the tone-poem impressionism of side one does its mysterious work. Highlight: the opening mood piece, 'Milky Way,' in which two Silent Way vets, soprano saxophonist Wayne Shorter and pianist Joe Zawinul, make sounds that suggest a carillon approaching a time warp."

== Track listing ==
Side A
No.	Title	Writer(s)	Length
1.	"Milky Way"	Wayne Shorter, Joe Zawinul	2:33
2.	"Umbrellas"	Shorter, Zawinul, Miroslav Vitouš	3:27
3.	"Seventh Arrow"	Vitouš	5:23
4.	"Orange Lady"	Zawinul	8:44

Side B
No.	Title	Writer(s)	Length
5.	"Morning Lake"	Vitouš	4:26
6.	"Waterfall"	Zawinul	6:20
7.	"Tears"	Shorter	3:25
8.	"Eurydice"	Shorter	5:45
Total length:			40:05

Note: "Eurydice (Full Length Unedited Version)", which runs for 10:44, appears on the later compilations Forecast: Tomorrow (2006) and The Columbia Albums 1971-1975 (2012).

== Personnel ==
Credits for Weather Report adapted from liner notes.

Weather Report

- Joe Zawinul – electric and acoustic piano
- Wayne Shorter – soprano saxophone
- Miroslav Vitouš – electric and acoustic bass
- Alphonse Mouzon – drums, voice
- Airto Moreira – percussion

Other musicians

- Barbara Burton – percussion (uncredited)
- Don Alias – percussion (uncredited)

Production

- Wayne Tarnowski – engineering
- Ed Lee – cover design
- Ed Freeman – cover photography
- Shoviza Productions, Inc. – production

== Awards ==
- "Jazz Album of the Year", DownBeat Readers Poll.
- Swing Journal magazine Grand Prix Award (a gold record given for winning the Journal's Readers' and Critics' polls).
