= Birdland (Weather Report song) =

Jazz/pop song written by Joe Zawinul of the band Weather Report

Single by Weather Report

from the album Heavy Weather
- Released: April 19, 1977
- Genre: Jazz fusion
- Length: 5:58
- Label: Columbia, CBS, ARC
- Songwriter: Joe Zawinul

"Birdland" is a jazz/pop song written by Joe Zawinul of the band Weather Report as a tribute to the Birdland nightclub in New York City, which appeared on the band's 1977 album Heavy Weather. The Manhattan Transfer won a Grammy Award with their 1979 version of the song, which had lyrics by Jon Hendricks. Quincy Jones won two Grammy Awards for the version of the piece he included on his 1989 album Back on the Block. The Cuban band Los Van Van included an extended interpolation of the piece in their song “Tim-Pop con Birdland”.

Intro of Birdland

== History ==
"Birdland" opens Heavy Weather, the 1977 album that marked the commercial peak of Weather Report's career. The composition is a tribute to the famous New York City jazz club named Birdland that operated on Broadway from 1949 through 1965 and hosted many great jazz musicians of the era. This was where Zawinul, who visited the club almost daily, heard performances by Count Basie, Louis Armstrong, Duke Ellington, and Miles Davis. It was also where he met his wife, Maxine. Looking back, Zawinul claimed, "The old Birdland was the most important place in my life." The song was also named in honor of Charlie Parker. According to Jaco Pastorius in a 1978 interview, the studio version of the song released on Heavy Weather was recorded in just one take.

The Penguin Guide to Jazz Recordings comments that “Birdland” typifies the formula that made the band successful, and “is one of only a handful of contemporary jazz tunes that everyone seems to have heard.”

== Personnel ==
- Joe Zawinul – Yamaha grand piano, ARP 2600 and Oberheim polyphonic synthesizer, melodica, vocals
- Wayne Shorter – soprano and tenor saxophones
- Jaco Pastorius – fretless bass, mandocello, vocals
- Manolo Badrena – tambourine
- Alex Acuña – drums

== Awards and honors ==
The Weather Report recording was inducted into the Grammy Hall of Fame in 2010.

== See also ==
- Maynard Ferguson
- Buddy Rich
- Quincy Jones
