= Live in Tokyo (Weather Report album) =

Live album by Weather Report
- Released: May 1, 1972
- Recorded: January 13, 1972
- Venues: Shibuya Kokaido Hall, Tokyo, Japan
- Genres: Jazz fusion; free jazz
- Length: 88:29
- Label: CBS/Sony
- Producer: Kiyoshi Itoh

Weather Report chronology
Weather Report (1971)	Live in Tokyo (1972)	I Sing the Body Electric (1972)

Professional ratings
Review scores
Source	Rating
AllMusic	4.5/5 stars
The Penguin Guide to Jazz Recordings	4/4 stars

Live in Tokyo is the third release and first live album by Weather Report. Originally released by CBS/Sony in Japan only, it was not released in the US until a 2014 CD reissue by Wounded Bird Records. Recording took place on January 13, 1972, one of five sold-out concerts played in Japan during that January. I Sing the Body Electric (1972) contained several tracks that were edited for the studio album, but can be heard as they were performed, in their entirety, on this live album.

== Track listing ==
1. Medley: "Vertical Invader" (Joe Zawinul) / "Seventh Arrow" (Miroslav Vitouš) / "T.H." (Vitouš) / "Doctor Honoris Causa" (Zawinul) – 26:14
2. Medley: "Surucucú" (Wayne Shorter) / "Lost" (Shorter) / "Early Minor" (Zawinul) / "Directions" (Zawinul) – 19:19
3. "Orange Lady" (Zawinul) – 18:14
4. Medley: "Eurydice" / "The Moors" (Shorter) – 13:49
5. Medley: "Tears" (Shorter) / "Umbrellas" (Shorter, Zawinul) – 10:54

== Personnel ==
Weather Report

- Joe Zawinul – electric and acoustic piano
- Wayne Shorter – soprano and tenor saxophones
- Miroslav Vitouš – bass
- Eric Gravatt – drums
- Dom Um Romão – percussion

Production

- Kiyoshi Itoh – producer
- Susumu Satoh – engineer
- Eiko Ishioka – design
- Yoshio Nakanishi – design
- Tadayuki Naitoh – photography
