= Mr. Gone (album) =

Studio album by Weather Report
- Released: September 1978
- Recorded: February–June 1978
- Studios: Devonshire, North Hollywood, California
- Genre: Jazz fusion
- Length: 37:30
- Label: ARC/Columbia
- Producers: Joe Zawinul, Jaco Pastorius

Weather Report chronology
Heavy Weather (1977)	Mr. Gone (1978)	8:30 (1979)

Mr. Gone is the eighth studio album by jazz fusion band Weather Report, released in 1978 by ARC/Columbia Records. The album reached number one on the Billboard Jazz Albums chart.

== Overview ==
As the group was still looking for a drummer following the departure of Alex Acuña, outside drummers Tony Williams and Steve Gadd appear along with Peter Erskine, who would become Acuña's replacement. Singers Deniece Williams and Maurice White also appear on the track "And Then." The Pastorius-penned "Punk Jazz" was later the title of a posthumous compilation of Jaco Pastorius's music.

The record became a center of controversy when DownBeat magazine gave it a one-star review. Zawinul went on to deliver a furious response to this review during a later interview.

According to Wayne Shorter, Joe Zawinul came up with the name "Mr. Gone" as a reference to Shorter who was absent while the band was working on that album. Shorter stated in an interview on the Questlove Supreme podcast, "I stayed another month in Brazil while they were making a record. They were making some music and they named it after me. Joe Zawinul said, 'Let's call this one, Mr. Gone.'"

== Critical reception ==
Professional ratings
Review scores
Source	Rating
AllMusic	3/5 stars
Christgau's Record Guide	B
The Penguin Guide to Jazz Recordings	2.5/4 stars
The Rolling Stone Jazz Record Guide	3/5 stars

Frederick I. Douglass of The Baltimore Sun proclaimed he tuned in and became "immersed in the electronic space sounds of Weather Report". Susan Toepfer of the New York Daily News claimed that Weather Report "continues to provide a couple outstanding cuts ('Mr Gone', 'Young and Fine') and compelling moments on even the most predictable selections".

Don Heckman of High Fidelity wrote "Still, despite Zawinul's electro-musical genius, despite the astonishing bass playing of Pastorius, despite the consistently rewarding improvisations of Shorter, and despite Pastorius' and Manolo Badrena's attempts to break out into exuberant vocalisms, this is a hard record to like without reservation". With that said the album was still named the Best Contemporary Jazz Album in High Fidelity's 1978 Critics Choice Poll.

Robert Christgau of The Village Voice gave a B grade, proclaiming "Like Black Market and Heavy Weather, this is short on rhythmic inspiration (four different drummers, no percussionists) and long on electric ivory. When I'm in the mood I can still get off on its rich colors and compositional flow." Music critic Jon Pareles later placed Mr. Gone in his ballot for The Village Voice's 1978 Pazz and Jop poll. Bill Milkowski of Jazzwise described Mr. Gone as "a collection of well-crafted confections".

== Track listing ==
No.	Title	Writer(s)	Length
1.	"The Pursuit of the Woman with the Feathered Hat"	Joe Zawinul	5:03
2.	"River People"	Jaco Pastorius	4:50
3.	"Young and Fine"	Joe Zawinul	6:55
4.	"The Elders"	Wayne Shorter	4:21
5.	"Mr. Gone"	Joe Zawinul	5:26
6.	"Punk Jazz"	Jaco Pastorius	5:09
7.	"Pinocchio"	Wayne Shorter	2:26
8.	"And Then"	Sam Guest	3:22

== Personnel ==
The recording and technical personnel were as follows:

Weather Report

- Joe Zawinul - modified Rhodes 88 electric piano, acoustic piano, two ARP 2600 synthesizers, Oberheim Polyphonic Synthesizer, Sequential Circuits Prophet-5 synthesizer, Mu-Tron Bi-Phase and Mu-Tron Volume Wah effects, kalimba, thumbeki drums, sleigh bells, melodica, high hat, vocals (tracks 1 & 5)
- Wayne Shorter - tenor, alto, and soprano saxophones, vocals (track 1)
- Jaco Pastorius - bass, drums (tracks 1–2), timpani (track 2), vocals (tracks 1–2 & 6)
- Peter Erskine - drums (tracks 1 & 7), hi hat (track 3), vocals (track 1)

Additional musicians

- Tony Williams - drums (tracks 5–6)
- Steve Gadd - drums (tracks 3 & 8)
- Manolo Badrena - vocal solo (track 1)
- Jon Lucien - vocals (track 1)
- Deniece Williams - vocals (track 8)
- Maurice White - vocals (track 8)

Production

- Alex Kazanegras - engineer
- Dave Mancini - second engineer
- Nancy Donald - cover design
- Lou Beach - cover illustration

== Charts ==
Chart (1978)	Peak position
US Billboard Top Jazz Albums	1
Swedish Pop Albums	47
UK Blues & Soul Top British Soul Albums	19
UK Pop Albums	47
