= Procession (album) =

Studio album by Weather Report
- Released: February 19, 1983
- Recorded: July – August 1982
- Studio: Power Station, New York City; Universal, Chicago; The Music Room, Pasadena; Fantasy, Berkeley; Sound Castle, Los Angeles
- Genre: Jazz fusion
- Length: 39:36
- Label: Columbia
- Producer: Joe Zawinul, Wayne Shorter

Weather Report chronology
| Weather Report (1982) | Procession (1983) | Domino Theory (1984) |

Procession is the eleventh studio album by the jazz fusion band Weather Report. It was released in 1983 through Columbia Records. Although several previous Weather Report tracks included wordless singing, and "And Then" from Mr. Gone included brief lyrics, "Where the Moon Goes" was the band's first track including lyrics throughout, sung by members of the Manhattan Transfer. The band would continue to feature vocals on the next three studio albums.

== Critical reception ==
Professional ratings
Review scores
| Source | Rating |
|---|---|
| AllMusic | 3/5 stars |
| The Penguin Guide to Jazz Recordings | 3/4 stars |
| The Rolling Stone Jazz Record Guide | 3/5 stars |

Richard S. Ginell of Allmusic, wrote "contrary to the conventional wisdom which claims that WR went downhill after the departure of Pastorius/Erskine, the new lineup actually recharged WR's creative batteries; the material here is superior to that of the previous two albums at least. Bailey, while not Jaco's technical equal, is mobile enough to project through the texture, and Hakim has the versatility and swinging Third World rhythmic influences that must have appealed to Zawinul...This is an unjustly overlooked Weather Report treasure."

Reviewing the album in Record, Steve Futterman dismissed Procession as being competently crafted but too similar to Weather Report's previous albums to be of any interest. Noting the band's change in lineup, he stated, "Integrating new members, finding what they can offer and letting them stir things up can give an established band a welcome jolt of creativity, of fresh ideas. But in Weather Report's case, the overwhelming control of co-leaders Joe Zawinul and Wayne Shorter has reined in the skills of bassist Victor Bailey, drummer Omar Hakim and percussionist José Rossy in service of highly crafted but essentially petrified music."

Charles McCollum of the Hartford Courant declared "The best part of any Weather Report effort is the interaction between Zawinul's multi-toned synthesizers and Shorter's blazing work on alto [sic] and tenor saxophones... Departures have done little to alter the consistent excellence of Weather Report's music and, if anything, Procession is one of the best albums the group has offered during its time together."

== Track listing ==
Side one

1. "Procession" (Josef Zawinul) – 8:42
2. "Plaza Real" (Wayne Shorter) – 5:30
3. "Two Lines" (Zawinul) – 7:43

Side two

1. "Where the Moon Goes" (Zawinul, lyrics by Nan O'Byrne and Zawinul) – 7:50
2. "The Well" (Shorter, Zawinul) – 4:00
3. "Molasses Run" (Omar Hakim) – 5:49

== Personnel ==
Weather Report

- Joe Zawinul – keyboards
- Wayne Shorter – tenor and soprano saxophones
- Omar Hakim – drums, guitar, vocals
- Victor Bailey – bass
- José Rossy – percussion, concertina

Additional musician

- The Manhattan Transfer – vocals (track 4)

Production

- Neil Dorfsman – engineer
- Tom Fouce – engineer
- Mitch Gibson – engineer
- Tom Miller – engineer
- John Lykes – cover artwork
- Bruce Talamon – photography
