= Tale Spinnin' =

Studio album by Weather Report
- Released: May 1975
- Recorded: February–April 4, 1975
- Studio: Wally Heider's Studio 3 (Hollywood)
- Genre: Jazz fusion
- Length: 43:01
- Label: Columbia
- Producers: Joe Zawinul, Wayne Shorter

Weather Report chronology
Mysterious Traveller (1974)	Tale Spinnin' (1975)	Black Market (1976)

Professional ratings
Review scores
Source	Rating
AllMusic	4/5 stars
Christgau's Record Guide	B−
The Penguin Guide to Jazz Recordings	3.5/4 stars
The Rolling Stone Jazz Record Guide	3/5 stars

Tale Spinnin' is the fifth studio album by Weather Report, recorded and released in 1975, featuring the addition of drummer Leon "Ndugu" Chancler, who was recruited after Joe Zawinul heard him play with Carlos Santana. Weather Report was recording in the studio next door to Ndugu, and asked him to join them for “one session”. That session ended up lasting a week and produced Tale Spinnin'. Ndugu was asked to join as a permanent member, but decided to stay with Santana.

Some Canadian copies of the album list a track entitled "Krampus" on the back of the sleeve. However, this track does not appear on the actual record.

== Release history ==
In addition to the usual 2-channel stereo version the album was also released by Columbia in 1975 in 4-channel quadraphonic sound on LP record and 8-track tape. The quad LP release was encoded in the SQ matrix system. The quad mixes were performed by Bruce Botnick.

The album was reissued in the UK on the Super Audio CD format in 2018 by Dutton Vocalion. This edition contains both the stereo and quad mixes.

== Track listing ==
Side A
No.	Title	Writer(s)	Length
1.	"Man in the Green Shirt"	Zawinul	6:29
2.	"Lusitanos"	Shorter	7:25
3.	"Between the Thighs"	Zawinul	9:33

Side B
No.	Title	Writer(s)	Length
1.	"Badia"	Zawinul	5:21
2.	"Freezing Fire"	Shorter	7:29
3.	"Five Short Stories"	Zawinul	6:56
Total length:			43:01

== Personnel ==
Weather Report

- Joe Zawinul – Rhodes piano, acoustic piano, melodica, TONTO synthesizer, ARP 2600 synthesizer, organ, steel drums, oud, mzuthra, West African talking drum, xylophone, cymbals, vocals
- Wayne Shorter – soprano and tenor saxophones
- Alphonso Johnson – electric bass
- Leon "Ndugu" Chancler – drums, tympani, marching cymbals
- Alyrio Lima – percussion

Production

- Bruce Botnick – engineer (recording, mixing)
- Wayne Shorter – engineer (mixing)
- Teresa Alfieri – cover design
- John Berg – cover design
