= Mysterious Traveller =

Studio album by Weather Report
- Released: June 1974
- Recorded: November 1973 – March 1974
- Studios: Devonshire Sound Studios, Los Angeles
- Genre: Jazz fusion
- Length: 48:17
- Label: Columbia
- Producers: Josef Zawinul, Wayne Shorter

Weather Report chronology
Sweetnighter (1973)	Mysterious Traveller (1974)	Tale Spinnin' (1975)

Professional ratings
Review scores
Source	Rating
All About Jazz	(favorable)
AllMusic	4.5/5 stars
Robert Christgau	B
The Penguin Guide to Jazz Recordings	4/4 stars
The Rolling Stone Jazz Record Guide	5/5 stars
Sputnikmusic	4/5 stars

Mysterious Traveller is the fourth studio album by the jazz and jazz fusion ensemble Weather Report, released in 1974. This was their final recording with founding bassist Miroslav Vitouš, who left due to creative differences. Vitouš was replaced by Alphonso Johnson. Another addition to the line-up is drummer Ishmael Wilburn, who stepped in after touring drummer Greg Errico declined an offer to join the band full-time.

The record is the band's first that predominantly uses electric bass and incorporates liberal uses of funk, R&B grooves, and rock that would later become part of their signature sound. Also, a greater emphasis on tightly-composed pieces became evident on this album, replacing the more open-ended improvisation formats used on the first three albums.

'Mysterious Traveller was voted album of the year by the readers of DownBeat magazine for 1974, garnering Weather Report's second overall win in that category, also garnering a five-star review from that publication along the way. The Penguin Guide to Jazz Recordings included the album in its suggested “core collection” of essential recordings.

The album peaked at number 2 in the Billboard Jazz Albums chart, number 31 in the R&B album chart, and number 46 in the Billboard 200.

== Track listing ==
Side A
No.	Title	Writer(s)	Length
1.	"Nubian Sundance"	Zawinul	10:40
2.	"American Tango"	Vitouš, Zawinul	3:40
3.	"Cucumber Slumber"	Johnson, Zawinul	8:22

Side B
No.	Title	Writer(s)	Length
1.	"Mysterious Traveller"	Shorter	7:21
2.	"Blackthorn Rose"	Shorter	5:03
3.	"Scarlet Woman"	Johnson, Shorter, Zawinul	5:46
4.	"Jungle Book"	Zawinul	7:25
Total length:			48:17

Bonus track in Sony Master Sound CD (1997)
No.	Title	Writer(s)	Length
8.	"Miroslav’s Tune"	Vitouš	5:25

== Personnel ==
=== Weather Report ===
- Joe Zawinul – electric and acoustic piano, synthesizer, guitar, kalimba, organ, tamboura, clay drum, tack piano, melodica
- Wayne Shorter – soprano & tenor saxophone, tack piano
- Miroslav Vitouš – acoustic bass (tracks 2 and 8)
- Alphonso Johnson – bass guitar
- Ishmael Wilburn – drums
- Skip Hadden – drums (tracks 1 & 4)
- Dom Um Romão – drums, percussion

=== Additional Personnel ===
- Ray Barretto – percussion (track 3)
- Muruga Booker – percussion (track 1)
- Steve Little – timpani (track 6)
- Don Ashworth – ocarinas & woodwinds (track 7)
- Isacoff – tabla, finger cymbals (track 7)
- Edna Wright – vocals (track 1)
- Marti McCall – vocals (track 1)
- Jessica Smith – vocals (track 1)
- James Gilstrap – vocals (track 1)
- Billie Barnum – vocals (track 1)

=== Production ===
- Ron Malo – sound engineer
- Teresa Alfieri – cover design
- Helmut Wimmer – cover artwork

== Chart performance ==
Chart (1974)	Peak position
Australia (Kent Music Report)	97
US Billboard 200	46
US Jazz Albums	2
US R&B Albums	31
Canada RPM Top 100 Albums	57
