= Alex Acuña =

Peruvian drummer and percussionist

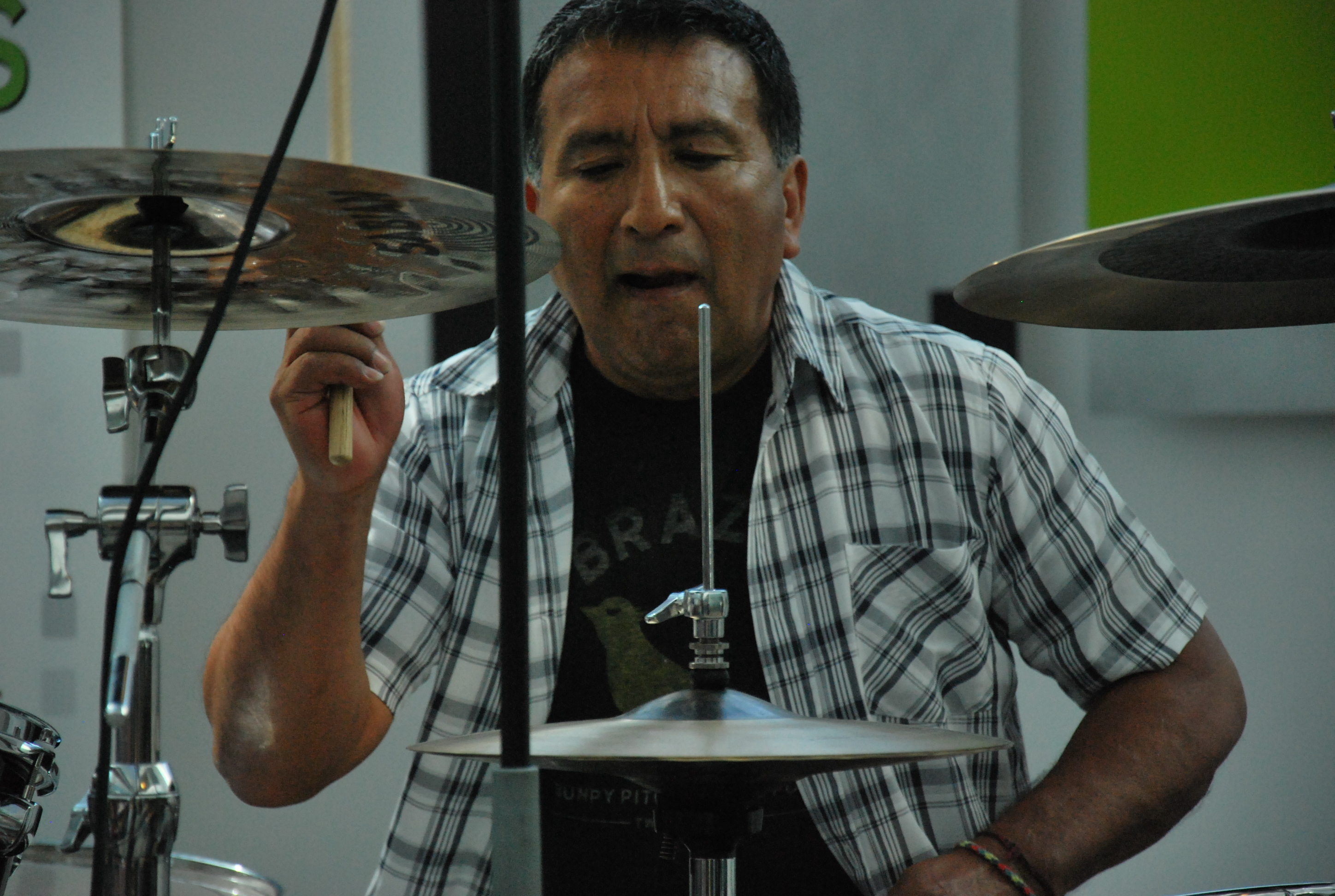
- Acuña in 2010

Background information
- Born: Alejandro Neciosup Acuña; December 12, 1944 (age 81); Pativilca, Barranca, Peru
- Genres: Jazz, jazz fusion, Afro-Cuban jazz, pop
- Occupation: Musician
- Instruments: Drums, percussion
- Formerly of: Weather Report; Koinonia

Alejandro Neciosup Acuña (born December 12, 1944), known professionally as Alex Acuña, is a Peruvian–American jazz drummer and percussionist. He has also worked as an educator at University of California, Los Angeles, and Berklee College of Music. LAMA, Musicians Institute, USC, CSUN.

== Background ==
Born in Pativilca, Peru, Acuña played in local bands such as La Orquesta de los Hermanos Neciosup from the age of ten. Acuña then followed his brothers and moved to Lima as a teenager. At the age of eighteen he joined the band of Perez Prado, and in 1965 he moved to San Juan, Puerto Rico. In 1974 Acuña moved to Las Vegas, working with artists such as Elvis Presley, The Temptations, and Diana Ross, and the following year he joined the jazz-fusion group Weather Report, appearing on the albums Black Market and Heavy Weather. While in New York City, Acuña recorded several songs under RCA records. Acuña decided to leave because of the genre limitations placed on him, in which RCA records only had him play Latin music.

Acuña left Weather Report in 1978, and became a session musician in California, recording and playing live with (amongst many others) Paul McCartney, Joni Mitchell, Ella Fitzgerald, Elvis Presley, Michael Jackson, Chick Corea, Whitney Houston, Plácido Domingo, former Weather Report bandmates Wayne Shorter and Joe Zawinul, Herbie Hancock, Carlos Santana, Antonio Carlos Jobim, Beck, Roberta Flack, U2, Al Jarreau and Marcos Witt. He appears on recordings by musicians as culturally diverse as Lee Ritenour, Johnny Clegg, Roy Orbison, YellowJackets, Lalo Schifrin, Milton Nascimento, Don Grusin, Dave Grusin, The Brecker Brothers, Arturo Sandoval, Vladislav Sendecki, Paquito d'Rivera, Gonzalo Rubalcaba, Brad Mehldau, BoDeans, Paco de Lucia, John Patitucci, Sadao Watanabe, Lyle Mays, Diana Ross, Sérgio Mendes, Robbie Robertson, Jackson Browne, Bette Midler, Jennifer Nettles, Christina Aguilera, Seal and Chris Botti.

In the 1980s Acuña also recorded and toured with the Christian jazz band Koinonia, which featured session musicians Abraham Laboriel, Justo Almario, Hadley Hockensmith, Harlan Rogers, and Bill Maxwell. He played on Willy DeVille's Crow Jane Alley album and in 1987 he teamed up with Elvis Presley's TCB Band for the Roy Orbison TV special "A Black and White Night". He played percussion on Blondie's number one hit "The Tide Is High" and also recorded more than 300 movies under the direction of Lalo Schifrin, Dave Grusin, Michel Legrand, Bill Conti, James Horner, James Newton Howard, John Williams, Alan Silvestri, Michael Giacchino, Christopher Beck, Maurice Jarre, Steve Jablonsky, John Powell, Atli Örvarsson and Heitor Pereira. In 1987, Acuña was summoned back to Perú by producer Ricardo Ghibellini to be the musical producer of Los Hijos del Sol, a group of Peruvians designed to promote Peruvian music worldwide.

== Equipment and instruments ==
Gon Bops Percussion:

- Alex Acuña Special Edition Congas
- Alex Acuña Signature Timbales
- Alex Acuña Special Edition Cajon
- Alex Acuña Signature Cajon
- Alex Acuña Special Edition Bongos
- Alex Acuña Bells
- Alex Acuña "Conquistador" Timbale Sticks

== Awards ==
- Best Latin/Brazilian Percussionist, Modern Drummer's Readers Poll.
