= Robert Thomas Jr. =

American drummer

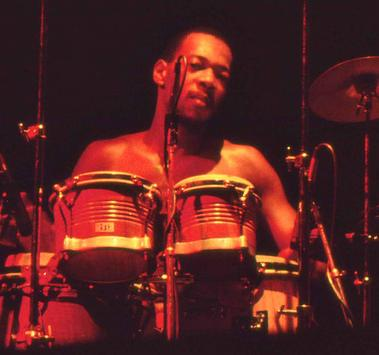
- Robert Thomas Jr. with Weather Report, Amsterdam, 1980

Background information
- Genre: Jazz
- Occupation: Musician
- Instruments: Drums, percussion, guitar, other
- Years active: 1960–current
- Label: Various
- Formerly of: Weather Report
- Website: Official site

Robert Thomas Jr. is an American jazz percussionist and hand drummer. He is known as an innovator in Be-bop and hand drumming, and has been nominated for two Grammy awards. He is also a visual artist, working as a painter.

== Life and career ==
Robert Thomas Jr. was born in Miami, the eldest of seven children, and grew up in North Miami Beach. He was encouraged by his fifth-grade teacher to play music, and not having an instrument, Thomas learned to play percussion on his desk. He sang in the choir at Oak Grove Missionary Baptist Church, and at age sixteen, began playing percussion with the Broomfield Family, a local group that performed in churches and nightclubs. He joined the ensemble as a roadie, but after playing percussion with the group at a private party, went on to play in the band. Although still under-age, he played with the group at such venues as the Castaway Hotel's Wreck Bar.

After graduating from high school, Thomas studied at Miami-Dade Community College. During this time, he discovered jazz, and began to play with saxophonist Jet Nero at the Gold Dust lounge and other artists including Ira Sullivan, Billy Marcus, Zoot Sims, Thad Jones, Monty Alexander and Mel Lewis. In the late 70s, Thomas played at a benefit with Jaco Pastorius in Miami Springs. Soon afterward, Thomas auditioned with Joe Zawinul and Wayne Shorter's jazz fusion group Weather Report at a live performance in New Haven, Connecticut. Thomas said afterward that they were looking for someone to play Be-bop, rather than Latin-style percussion. He settled in France, and continued to play with Weather Report until 1981, and in the short-lived Weather Update in 1986-7. After the group disbanded, Thomas resettled in Miami, and shortly afterward issued a solo CD of his own music In the Dreamtime on a local label. He continued to work with Zawinul until 1994.

Besides Weather Report, Thomas played with The Zawinul Syndicate, Jaco Pastorius' Word of Mouth band, and individual artists including Stan Getz, David Sanborn, Carlos Santana, Eddie Harris, Branford Marsalis, Herbie Mann, Ahmad Jamal and Roberto Perera. World artists he has played with include sitar player Amitava Chatterjee, and African artist Vinx. Thomas maintains an extensive discography and has issued several solo CDs. on which he plays an eclectic mix of instruments including conga drums, wind instruments, guitar and the African bow harp.

Thomas is married to Jane Thomas and has a son, Spencer.
