= Black Market (Weather Report album) =

Studio album by Weather Report
- Released: March 11, 1976
- Recorded: December 1975 – January 1976
- Studio: Devonshire Sound Studios (Los Angeles)
- Genre: Jazz fusion; world
- Length: 37:20
- Label: Columbia
- Producer: Joe Zawinul, Wayne Shorter

Weather Report chronology
Tale Spinnin' (1975)	Black Market (1976)	Heavy Weather (1977)

Professional ratings
Review scores
Source	Rating
AllMusic	4.5/5 stars
The Penguin Guide to Jazz Recordings	3.5/4 stars
The Rolling Stone Jazz Record Guide	4/5 stars
Sputnikmusic	4.5/5 stars

Black Market is the sixth studio album by American jazz fusion band Weather Report. Released in 1976, it was produced by Joe Zawinul and Wayne Shorter. It was recorded between December 1975 and January 1976 and released in March 1976 through Columbia Records.

This is Weather Report's first studio album to feature bass player Jaco Pastorius; he appears on two tracks, one of which was his own composition "Barbary Coast". The back cover photo shows Pastorius, Chester Thompson, and Alex Acuña with the band, although bass player Alphonso Johnson played on the majority of the record's tracks. The album draws heavily from African influences, and its style could be described as "world fusion". The second track, "Cannon Ball", is a tribute to saxophonist Julian "Cannonball" Adderley, Zawinul's employer for several years during the 1960s. Adderley died a few months before Black Market was recorded.

== Track listing ==
Side one
No.	Title	Writer(s)	Length
1.	"Black Market"	Joe Zawinul	6:28
2.	"Cannon Ball"	Zawinul	4:36
3.	"Gibraltar"	Zawinul	8:16
Total length:			19:18

Side two
No.	Title	Writer(s)	Length
4.	"Elegant People"	Wayne Shorter	5:03
5.	"Three Clowns"	Shorter	3:31
6.	"Barbary Coast"	Jaco Pastorius	3:19
7.	"Herandnu"	Alphonso Johnson	6:36
Total length:			18:20

== Personnel ==
Weather Report

- Joe Zawinul – Yamaha Grand Piano, Rhodes Electric Piano, 2 × ARP 2600, Oberheim Polyphonic Synthesizer, orchestration
- Wayne Shorter – Selmer soprano and tenor saxophones, Computone Lyricon
- Alphonso Johnson – electric bass
- Jaco Pastorius – electric fretless bass (tracks 2 & 6)
- Narada Michael Walden – drums (tracks 1–2)
- Chester Thompson – drums (tracks 1, 3–7)
- Alex Acuña – congas, percussion (tracks 2–5, 7)
- Don Alias – percussion (tracks 1 & 6)

Production

- Joe Zawinul – producer
- Wayne Shorter – co-producer
- Ron Malo – engineer
- Nancy Donald – cover design
- David McMacken – cover illustration
- Ed Caraeff – photography
