= Heavy Weather (album) =

Studio album by Weather Report
- Released: March 1977
- Recorded: December 1976 – January 1977; July 8, 1976 (Rumba Mamá)
- Studio: Devonshire, North Hollywood, California
- Genre: Jazz fusion
- Length: 37:50
- Label: Columbia
- Producer: Joe Zawinul, Jaco Pastorius, Wayne Shorter

Weather Report chronology
Black Market (1976)	Heavy Weather (1977)	Mr. Gone (1978)

Heavy Weather is the seventh album by Weather Report, released in 1977 through Columbia Records. By 1991, the release had sold 1,000,000 copies in the US alone; it would prove to be the band's most commercially successful album and one of the best sellers in the Columbia jazz catalog. DownBeat magazine gave Heavy Weather a five-star review, and later its readers voted it jazz album of the year.

The lineup for the album consisted of Weather Report founders Joe Zawinul (keyboards, synthesizers) and Wayne Shorter (saxophone), alongside Jaco Pastorius (bass), Alex Acuña (drums), and Manolo Badrena (percussion). It was produced and orchestrated by Zawinul, with additional production by Shorter and Pastorius, and engineered by Ron Malo.

The album opens with "Birdland", which on its own became a significant commercial success, unusual for an instrumental composition, and would go on to become a jazz standard. The melody had been performed live by the band as part of "Dr Honoris Causa", which was from Joe Zawinul's eponymous solo album. "Teen Town", a Pastorius composition where his bass takes the lead instrument role, is often considered a highlight of the album and of Pastorius's career. "Rumba Mamá", a percussion and vocal feature for Manolo Badrena and Alex Acuña, was recorded live at a summer 1976 concert in Montreux, Switzerland, which was also the subject of a DVD released in 2007.

== Critical reception ==
Professional ratings
Contemporary
Review scores
Source	Rating
The Penguin Guide to Jazz Recordings	3.5/4 stars
The Rolling Stone Jazz Record Guide	5/5 stars

Dan Oppenheimer said in a June 1977 review for Rolling Stone that he felt the band had moved away from their earlier music, losing a lot of the space, melodies and airy feel that set them apart from other jazz-rock bands, but gaining a new bassist who "has been instrumental in developing their busier, talkative style", and that while their music previously "went up and up only, becoming more ethereal as it went, the new bottom makes all the difference in the world".

=== Legacy ===
Professional ratings
Legacy
Review scores
Source	Rating
AllMusic	5/5 stars
ARTISTdirect	5/5 stars
The Encyclopedia of Popular Music	5/5 stars

Richard Ginell commented in a retrospective review for AllMusic that it was released "just as the jazz-rock movement began to run out of steam"; however, he felt that "this landmark album proved that there was plenty of creative life left in the idiom."

In February 2011, Heavy Weather was inducted into the Grammy Hall of Fame.

The album was included in Robert Dimery's 1001 Albums You Must Hear Before You Die.

In 2000, it was voted No. 822 in Colin Larkin's All Time Top 1000 Albums.

The singer Bilal names it among his 25 favorite albums, citing the interplay between Jaco Pastorius and Joe Zawinul.

== Track listing ==
Side A
No.	Title	Writer(s)	Length
1.	"Birdland"	Zawinul	5:57
2.	"A Remark You Made"	Zawinul	6:51
3.	"Teen Town"	Pastorius	2:51
4.	"Harlequin"	Shorter	3:59

Side B
No.	Title	Writer(s)	Length
1.	"Rumba Mamá"	Badrena, Acuña	2:11
2.	"Palladíum"	Shorter	4:46
3.	"The Juggler"	Zawinul	5:03
4.	"Havona"	Pastorius	6:01

Besides some CD reissues there is also an "Expanded Edition" with three bonus tracks

- Black Market (live) 9:25
- Teen Town (live) 6:30
- Birdland (live) 6:36

== Personnel ==
Weather Report

- Joe Zawinul – ARP 2600 on all tracks except "Rumba Mamá", Rhodes electric piano on all tracks except "Birdland", "Rumba Mamá", and "Havona", Yamaha grand piano on "Birdland", "Harlequin", "The Juggler", and "Havona", Oberheim polyphonic synthesizer on all tracks except "Rumba Mamá", "Palladíum", and "The Juggler", vocals on "Birdland", melodica on "Birdland" and "Teen Town", guitar and tabla on "The Juggler".
- Wayne Shorter – Soprano saxophone on all tracks except "A Remark You Made" and "Rumba Mamá", tenor saxophone on "Birdland", "A Remark You Made", and "Palladíum"
- Jaco Pastorius – Fretless bass on all tracks except "Rumba Mamá", mandocello on "Birdland" and "The Juggler", vocals on "Birdland", drums on "Teen Town", steel drums on "Palladíum"
- Alex Acuña – Drums on all tracks except "Teen Town" and "Rumba Mamá", congas and tom-toms on "Rumba Mamá", handclaps on "The Juggler"
- Manolo Badrena – Tambourine on "Birdland", congas on "Teen Town", "Rumba Mamá", and "Palladíum", vocals on "Harlequin" and "Rumba Mamá", timbales on "Rumba Mamá", percussion on "Palladíum" and "The Juggler"

Production

- Joe Zawinul – producer and orchestrator
- Jaco Pastorius – co-producer
- Wayne Shorter – assistant producer
- Ron Malo – engineer
- Jerry Hudgins – assistant engineer
- Brian Risner – assistant engineer and chief meteorologist
- Frank Tozour – Sony reissue remastering
- Nancy Donald – design
- Lou Beach – illustration
- Keith Williamson – photography

== Charts ==
=== Weekly charts ===
Chart (1977)	Peak position
Swedish Albums (Sverigetopplistan)	40
US Billboard 200	30
US Top Jazz Albums (Billboard)	1
US Top R&B/Hip-Hop Albums (Billboard)	33

=== Year-end charts ===
Chart (1977)	Position
US Billboard 200	100
US Top Jazz Albums (Billboard)	5

Chart (1978)	Position
US Top Jazz Albums (Billboard)	42

== Certifications ==
Certifications for Heavy Weather
Region	Certification	Certified units/sales
United States (RIAA)	Platinum	1,000,000^{^}
^{^} Shipments figures based on certification alone.

== Release history ==
The album was first released in LP format worldwide throughout Columbia Records, CBS Records, Sony Records, and other minor record labels. In 1984, it was first released in CD format in the U.S. on Columbia Records. In 1992, the album was remastered, and, in 2002, published in Super Audio CD format.

See the table below for a more comprehensive list of the album releases.

Year	Format	Label	Country	Note
1977	LP & Cassette	Columbia (PC 34418)	Canada, U.S.	—
1977	LP & Cassette	CBS, Sony (25AP 357)	Japan	—
1977	LP & Cassette	CBS ([CBS ][S ]81775)	Italy, Netherlands, UK, U.S.	—
1977	LP & Cassette	Suzy (CBS 81775/P 1977)	Yugoslavia	Published as Heavy Rain
1977	LP & Cassette	CBS (SBP 234974)	Australia	—
1979	LP & Cassette	Supraphon, CBS (1115 2490)	Czechoslovakia	Published as Weather Report
1981	LP & Cassette	Columbia (HC 44418)	U.S.	—
1983	LP & Cassette	CBS (CBS 32358)	Europe	—
1984	CD	Columbia (CK 34418)	U.S.	—
1991	CD	Columbia (468209 2)	U.S.	—
1992	CD	Columbia (CK 47481)	U.S.	Remastered
1994	CD, Gold CD	Columbia, Legacy, Master Sound (CK 64427)	U.S.	Remastered
1997	CD, MD	Columbia, Legacy (CK 65108)	Europe, U.S.	Remastered
2002	SACD	Columbia, Legacy (CS 65108)	U.S.	Remastered
