= List of jazz fusion musicians =

The following are notable jazz fusion performers or bands.

For performers of smooth jazz, a more radio-friendly, pop-infused variant of fusion, see List of smooth jazz performers.

Name	Instrument	Year	Style	Jazz fusion connections	Jazz fusion recordings
A					
John Abercrombie	Guitar	1944–2017	Progressive jazz, jazz fusion, post bop	Billy Cobham, Jack DeJohnette, Brecker Brothers, Gateway, Kenny Kirkland	As leader: Timeless (1975), with Gateway: Gateway (1975)
Alex Acuña	Percussion	1944	Jazz, jazz fusion, Afro-Cuban jazz	Weather Report, John Patitucci, Joe Zawinul, Vladislav Sendecki, Larry Carlton, Alphonso Johnson, Brent Fischer, Koinonia, Abraham Laboriel	With Weather Report: Black Market (1976), Heavy Weather (1977)
Don Alias	Percussion	1939–2006	Jazz, jazz fusion	Miles Davis, David Sanborn, Herbie Hancock, Chick Corea, Michael Brecker, Jaco Pastorius, Pat Metheny, Weather Report, Jack DeJohnette	With Miles Davis: Bitches Brew (1970), On the Corner (1972), with Jeremy Steig: Energy (1971), Fusion (1972), with The Tony Williams Lifetime: Ego (1971), with Carlos Santana and John McLaughlin: Love Devotion Surrender (1973), with Dave Liebman: Sweet Hands (1975), with Weather Report: Black Market (1976), with Jaco Pastorius: Jaco Pastorius (1976), Word of Mouth (1981), Invitation (1983), The Birthday Concert (1995), with Miroslav Vitous: Miroslav (1978), with Mike Stern: Time in Place (1988), Jigsaw (1989), Odds or Evens (1991), Give and Take (1997), with Marcus Miller: The Sun Don't Lie (1993), with John McLaughlin: The Promise (1995), with Pat Metheny Group: Imaginary Day (1997)
Brian Auger	Keyboards	1939	Jazz fusion	Brian Auger and the Trinity, CAB	With Brian Auger and the Trinity: Open (1967), Streetnoise (1969), Befour (1970), with Brian Auger's Oblivion Express: A Better Land (1971), Second Wind (1972), Closer to It! (1973), Straight Ahead (1974), with CAB: CAB (2000), CAB 2 (2001), CAB 4 (2003), Theatre de Marionnettes (2009)
Kinan Azmeh	Clarinet	1976	Jazz fusion	Hewar	
B					
Victor Bailey	Bass	1960	Jazz, jazz fusion, pop	Joe Zawinul, Weather Report, Larry Coryell, Billy Cobham, Vladislav Sendecki	As leader: Low Blow (1999), That's Right! (2001), with Weather Report: Weather Report (1982 album) (1982), Procession (1983), Domino Theory (1984), Sportin' Life (1985), This Is This! (1986), with Steps Ahead: Live in Tokyo 1986 (1986), Magnetic (1986), Vibe (NYC, 1995), with Larry Coryell and Lenny White: Electric (2005), with Joe Zawinul: World Tour (1998), Faces & Places (2002), Brown Street (2007)
Ginger Baker	Drums	1939-2019	Jazz, jazz fusion, blues-rock, psychedelic rock, hard rock, world music	Ginger Baker's Air Force, Ginger Baker's African Force	As leader: Ginger Baker's Air Force (1970), Ginger Baker's Air Force II (1970), Horses & Trees (1986)
Louis Banks	Keyboards	1941	Jazz, film score, theatre, world music	John McLaughlin	
Jennifer Batten	Guitar	1957	Instrumental rock, hard rock, electronica, progressive rock, jazz fusion	Jeff Beck, Jennifer Batten's Tribal Rage	
Jim Beard	Keyboards	1960	Jazz fusion	John Scofield, Wayne Shorter, John McLaughlin, Mike Stern, Dennis Chambers, Bob Berg	
Jeff Beck	Guitar	1944-2023	Blues-rock, jazz fusion, instrumental rock, hard rock, electronica, progressive rock	The Jeff Beck Group, Upp	As leader: Blow by Blow (1975), Wired (1976)
Jay Beckenstein	Saxophone	1949	Jazz fusion	Spyro Gyra	
Jeff Berlin	Bass	1953	Jazz, jazz fusion, progressive rock	Bill Bruford, Patrick Moraz	
Warren Bernhardt	Keyboards	1938	Jazz, jazz fusion	Mike Mainieri, Steps Ahead, Kazumi Watanabe	With Jeremy Steig: Jeremy & The Satyrs (1968), This Is Jeremy Steig (1969), with Mike Mainieri: Journey Thru an Electric Tube (1968), White Elephant (1972), Wanderlust (1981), Free Smiles (1978), Live at the Seventh Avenue South (1996), with Kazumi Watanabe: To Chi Ka (1980), Dogatana (1981), with Steps Ahead: Modern Times (1984), Magnetic (1986)
Richard Bona	Bass	1967	Jazz fusion, world fusion	Larry Coryell, Brecker Brothers, Kenny Kirkland, Mike Stern, Steve Gadd, Pat Metheny Group, Zawinul Syndicate	
Michael Brecker	Saxophone	1949–2007	Jazz, jazz fusion, funk, R&B, rock	Herbie Hancock, Chick Corea, Kenny Kirkland, Jaco Pastorius, Vladislav Sendecki, Pat Metheny, Steps Ahead	
Randy Brecker	Trumpet	1945	Jazz, fusion, funk, R&B, rock	Brecker Brothers, Billy Cobham, Kenny Kirkland, Frank Zappa, Vladislav Sendecki, Jaco Pastorius	
Jack Bruce	Bass	1943–2014	Blues-rock, psychedelic rock, jazz fusion, hard rock, acid rock	John McLaughlin, Dick Heckstall-Smith, Jon Hiseman, Larry Coryell, Mitch Mitchell, Tony Williams Lifetime, Tony Williams, Kenny Kirkland, Larry Young	
Bill Bruford	Drums	1949	Progressive rock, instrumental rock, jazz fusion	Allan Holdsworth, Dave Stewart, Jeff Berlin	As leader: Feels Good to Me (1978), One of a Kind (1979), The Bruford Tapes (1979), Gradually Going Tornado (1980)
Bunny Brunel	Bass	1950	Jazz fusion	Chick Corea, Herbie Hancock, Wayne Shorter, CAB	
Hiram Bullock	Guitar	1955–2008	Jazz, jazz fusion	Jaco Pastorius, Brecker Brothers, Marcus Miller, Steps Ahead	
Tony Bunn	Bass	1957	Jazz, jazz fusion, funk	Michal Urbaniak, Harold Ivory Williams, Dennis Chambers	
Gary Burton	Vibraphone	1943	Jazz, jazz fusion	Larry Coryell, Pat Metheny, John Scofield, Peter Erskine, Mitchel Forman, Keith Jarrett, Chick Corea, Dave Holland	As leader: Duster (1967)
Donald Byrd	Trumpet	1932–2000	Jazz, jazz fusion, funk	Harvey Mason, Alphonse Mouzon	As leader: Electric Byrd (1970), Ethiopian Knights (1971)
C					
Larry Carlton	Guitar	1948	Jazz, smooth jazz, jazz fusion, pop, rock	Steve Lukather, Robben Ford, Kenny Kirkland	
Alain Caron	Bass	1955	Jazz, jazz fusion	Uzeb, Didier Lockwood	
Dennis Chambers	Drums	1959	Jazz, jazz fusion, funk music, Latin rock	John Scofield, Brecker Brothers, John McLaughlin, Mike Stern, Cristiano Parato	
Bill Chase	Trumpet	1934–1974	Jazz rock	Chase	As leader: Chase (1971), Ennea (1972), Pure Music (1974)
Jonathan Chua	Drums	1990	Jazz, jazz fusion, progressive rock, funk, bebop, post bop, hard bop	Dick Lee, Jeremy Monteiro	With The Sam Willows: Take Heart (2016)
Stanley Clarke	Bass	1951	Jazz, jazz fusion, funk, rock, pop, R&B	Return to Forever, Chick Corea, Jeff Beck, SMV, George Duke, Kenny Kirkland	As leader: Stanley Clarke (1974), School Days, with Return to Forever: Light as a Feather (1973), Hymn of the Seventh Galaxy (1973), Where Have I Known You Before (1974), Romantic Warrior (1976), Musicmagic (1977)
Billy Cobham	Drums	1944	Jazz, jazz fusion, post-bop, funk, progressive rock, rock and roll, soul	Miles Davis, Mahavishnu Orchestra, Jack Bruce, Kenny Kirkland, John McLaughlin, Vladislav Sendecki	As leader: Spectrum (1973), with Mahavishnu Orchestra: The Inner Mounting Flame (1971), Birds of Fire (1972), Between Nothingness and Eternity (1973), The Lost Trident Sessions (1973)
Vinnie Colaiuta	Drums	1956	Jazz, jazz fusion, rock, funk, thrash metal, heavy metal	Frank Zappa, Chick Corea, Jeff Beck, Herbie Hancock, John McLaughlin, Christian McBride, Five Peace Band	
Bill Connors	Guitar	1949	Jazz, jazz fusion	Return to Forever, Stanley Clarke	With Return to Forever: Hymn of the Seventh Galaxy (1973), with Stanley Clarke: Stanley Clarke (1974), with Corea, Clarke & White: Forever (2011)
Chick Corea	Keyboards	1941–2021	Jazz, jazz fusion, post bop, Latin jazz, classical music, avant-garde jazz	Return to Forever, Five Peace Band, Chaka Khan	As leader: Return to Forever (1972), The Leprechaun (1976), My Spanish Heart (1976), with Return to Forever: Light as a Feather (1973), Hymn of the Seventh Galaxy (1973), Where Have I Known You Before (1974), Romantic Warrior (1976), Musicmagic (1977)
Larry Coryell	Guitar	1943–2017	Jazz, jazz fusion, jazz rock, post-bop, free jazz	The Eleventh House, John McLaughlin	As leader: Barefoot Boy (1971), Introducing Eleventh House with Larry Coryell (1974), with Gary Burton: Duster (1967)
Tom Coster	Keyboards	1941	Jazz fusion, crossover jazz	Billy Cobham, Larry Coryell, Frank Gambale, Vital Information	
Kirk Covington	Drums	1956/1957-	Jazz fusion	Tribal Tech, Gary Willis, Scott Henderson, John Humphrey, Allan Holdsworth, Joe Zawinul	
D					
Miles Davis	Trumpet	1926–1991	Jazz, hard bop, bebop, cool jazz, modal, fusion, third stream, jazz-funk jazz rap	Wayne Shorter, John McLaughlin, Herbie Hancock, Billy Cobham, Chick Corea, Dave Holland, Jack DeJohnette, Joe Zawinul, Tony Williams	As leader: Filles de Kilimanjaro (1969), In a Silent Way (1969), Bitches Brew (1970), Miles Davis at Fillmore: Live at the Fillmore East (1970), A Tribute to Jack Johnson (1971), Live-Evil (1971), On the Corner (1972), Black Beauty: Live at the Fillmore West (1973), In Concert (1973), Big Fun (1974), Get Up With It (1974), Agharta (1975), Pangaea (1975), Dark Magus (1977), We Want Miles (1982), Star People (1983), Live at the Fillmore East, March 7, 1970: It's About That Time (2001), The Cellar Door Sessions 1970 (2005), Bitches Brew Live (2011)
Torsten de Winkel	Guitar	1965	World fusion, jazz fusion	Michael Brecker, Billy Cobham, Alphonse Mouzon, Steve Smith, Pat Metheny	
Elton Dean	Saxophone	1946–2006	Free jazz, jazz fusion, post-bop	Soft Machine	With Soft Machine: Third (1970), Fourth (1971), Fifth (1972), as leader: Elton Dean (1971)
Jack DeJohnette	Drums	1942-2025	Jazz, jazz fusion, new age	Miles Davis, Keith Jarrett, Kenny Kirkland, John Scofield, John Abercrombie, Dave Holland, Gateway, Compost, Trio Beyond	With Freddie Hubbard: Straight Life (1970), First Light (1971), with Miles Davis: Live-Evil (1971), On the Corner (1972), Black Beauty: Live at the Fillmore West (1973), Big Fun (1974), with Joe Zawinul: Zawinul (1971), with Joe Farrell: Moon Germs (1972), with John Abercrombie and Jan Hammer: Timeless (1974), with Gateway: Gateway (1975), with Terje Rypdal and Miroslav Vitous: Terje Rypdal / Miroslav Vitous / Jack DeJohnette (1978), To Be Continued (1981), with Michael Brecker: Michael Brecker (1987), Nearness of You: The Ballad Book (2001)
Orhan Demir	Guitar	1954	Jazz fusion, post-bop		
Joe DeRenzo	Drums	1958	Jazz fusion, world music	Yellowjackets	
Al Di Meola	Guitar	1954	Jazz, jazz fusion, Latin jazz, world fusion	Return to Forever, Stanley Clarke, Jan Hammer, Jean-Luc Ponty, John McLaughlin	As leader: Land of the Midnight Sun (1976), Elegant Gypsy (1977), Casino (1978), Splendido Hotel (1980)
Virgil Donati	Drums	1958	Progressive metal, jazz fusion	Planet X, Derek Sherinian, Tribal Tech, Scott Henderson, Tony MacAlpine	
George Duke	Keyboards	1946–2013	Jazz fusion, R&B, funk, alternative rock music, rock and roll, jazz pop	Frank Zappa, Jean-Luc Ponty, Stanley Clarke, Billy Cobham, Kenny Kirkland, Steps Ahead	
E					
Jimmy Earl	Bass	1957	Jazz, jazz fusion	The Crusaders, Stanley Clarke, Chick Corea, Pino Daniele, Robben Ford, Cleto and the Cletones	
Mark Egan	Bass	1951	Jazz, jazz fusion	Elements, Pat Metheny Group	
Peter Erskine	Drums	1954	Jazz, jazz fusion	Weather Report, Steely Dan, Jaco Pastorius, Brent Fischer, Bob Mintzer, Yellowjackets, Steps Ahead, Maynard Ferguson, Stan Kenton, Eliane Elias	
Bill Evans	Piano	1958	Jazz, jazz fusion	Miles Davis, John McLaughlin	
F					
Joe Farrell	Saxophone	1937–1986	Jazz, jazz funk, fusion, crossover jazz, hard bop	John McLaughlin, Chick Corea, Jack DeJohnette, Dave Holland, Chick Corea, Herbie Hancock, Return to Forever, Fuse One, Flora Purim	As leader: Moon Germs (1972), Penny Arcade (1973), Upon This Rock (1974), Canned Funk (1975), with Chick Corea: Tones for Joan's Bones (1968), The Leprechaun (1976), The Mad Hatter (1978), with Herbie Hancock: Mwandishi (1971), with Return to Forever: Light as a Feather (1973), Return to Forever (1972), Musicmagic (1977), Live (1977), with Billy Cobham: Spectrum (1973), with Santana: Welcome (1973), with The Jeff Lorber Fusion: Soft Space (1978), Water Sign (1979), with Flora Purim: Carry On (1979), with Fuse One: Fuse One (1980), Silk (1981), Ice (1984), with Bunny Brunel: Ivanhoe (1983)
Carl Filipiak	Guitar	1950	Jazz, jazz fusion, rock	Scott Ambush, Bob Berg, Will Calhoun, Dennis Chambers, Lafayette Gilchrist, Mike Pope, Victor Wooten	
Brent Fischer	Bass	1964	Jazz, jazz fusion, funk, Latin jazz, world music	Alex Acuna, Peter Erskine, Steve Khan	
Béla Fleck	Banjo	1958	Jazz, jazz fusion, bluegrass, folk, classical, world music	Trio!, Chick Corea, Bela Fleck and the Flecktones	
Robben Ford	Guitar	1951	Blues, jazz/fusion, rock	Yellowjackets, Chick Corea, Kenny Kirkland	
Mitchel Forman	Keyboards	1956	Jazz fusion, jazz	John McLaughlin, Wayne Shorter, John Scofield, Mike Stern, Dave Samuels, Gary Burton, Pat Metheny, Simon Phillips, Bill Evans	
Russ Freeman	Guitar	1960	Smooth jazz, jazz fusion, jazz-pop	The Rippingtons	
Bill Frisell	Guitar	1951	Jazz, jazz fusion, alternative country, experimental rock, world music		
G					
Frank Gambale	Guitar	1958	Jazz fusion, smooth jazz, jazz, instrumental rock	Jean-Luc Ponty, Chick Corea Elektric Band, Vital Information, Return to Forever	
Kenny Garrett	Saxophone	1960	Jazz, jazz fusion	Miles Davis, Marcus Miller, Chick Corea, John McLaughlin, Five Peace Band	
Matt Garrison	Bass	1970	Jazz, jazz fusion	Pat Metheny, Joe Zawinul, John McLaughlin, Dennis Chambers	
Jerry Goodman	Violin	1949	Jazz, jazz fusion	Mahavishnu Orchestra, John McLaughlin, Jan Hammer	
John Goodsall	Guitar	1953	Progressive rock, jazz fusion	Brand X, Bill Bruford	
Danny Gottlieb	Drums	1953	Jazz, jazz fusion, rock	Mahavishnu Orchestra, Elements, Pat Metheny	
Steve Grossman	Saxophone	1951	Jazz fusion, hard bop, cool jazz	Miles Davis, Jan Hammer, Masabumi Kikuchi, Teruo Nakamura	As leader: Some Shapes to Come (1974)
Don Grolnick	Keyboards	1948–1996	Jazz, jazz fusion	Mike Mainieri, Mike Stern, Brecker Brothers, Dreams, Steps Ahead	
Trilok Gurtu	Percussion	1951	Jazz, jazz fusion, world music	John McLaughlin, Pat Metheny, Joe Zawinul	
H					
Omar Hakim	Drums	1959	Jazz, jazz fusion, pop	Miles Davis, Weather Report, Kazumi Watanabe, Marcus Miller, Victor Bailey	
Stuart "Stu" Hamm	Bass	1960	Fusion, country, classical	Frank Gambale, Joe Satriani, Steve Vai, Bx3	
Jan Hammer	Keyboards	1948	Jazz fusion, synthpop, pop rock	Mahavishnu Orchestra, Jeff Beck, Al Di Meola, John Abercrombie, Jack DeJohnette, Stanley Clarke, Billy Cobham	
Herbie Hancock	Keyboards	1940	Jazz, bebop, post bop, jazz fusion, hard bop, jazz-funk, funk, R&B, electro funk, classical	Miles Davis, Jaco Pastorius, Bennie Maupin, Paul Jackson, Mike Clark, Chick Corea, Tony Williams, Wayne Shorter, Marcus Miller, Jack DeJohnette, Dave Holland, Pat Metheny	As leader: Mwandishi (1971), Crossings (1972), Sextant (1973), Head Hunters (1973), Thrust (1974), Man-Child (1975), Flood (1975), Secrets (1976), V.S.O.P. (1977), Mr. Hands (1980), with Miles Davis: Filles de Kilimanjaro (1969), In a Silent Way (1969), Bitches Brew (1970), A Tribute to Jack Johnson (1971), Live-Evil (1971), On the Corner (1972), Big Fun (1974), Get Up With It (1974), with Chick Corea: Tones for Joan's Bones (1968), The Mad Hatter (1978), with Miroslav Vitouš: Infinite Search (1970), with Freddie Hubbard: Red Clay (1970), Straight Life (1971), First Light (1971), with Joe Zawinul: Zawinul (1971), with Wayne Shorter: Native Dancer (1975), with Jaco Pastorius: Jaco Pastorius (1976), Word of Mouth (1981), Invitation (1983), with Lenny White: Big City (1977), with The Tony Williams Lifetime: The Joy of Flying (1978)
Jonas Hellborg	Bass	1958	Jazz, jazz fusion, jazz metal	John McLaughlin, Shawn Lane	
Joe Henderson	Saxophone	1937–2001	Hard bop, post-bop, jazz fusion, world fusion	Ron Carter, Leon "Ndugu" Chancler, Chick Corea, Freddie Hubbard, Flora Purim, Vladislav Sendecki, Miroslav Vitouš	As leader: Multiple (1973), The Elements (1974), Canyon Lady (1975), with Miroslav Vitouš: Infinite Search (1970), with Herbie Hancock: Mwandishi (1970), with Freddie Hubbard: Straight Life (1970), with Flora Purim: Butterfly Dreams (1973), Encounter (1977), with Rick Laird: Soft Focus (1976)
Scott Henderson	Guitar	1954	Jazz fusion, jazz-funk, blues	Jean-Luc Ponty, Jeff Berlin, Joe Zawinul, Chick Corea Elektric Band, Tribal Tech, Gary Willis, Vital Tech Tones, Victor Wooten, Steve Smith	
Allan Holdsworth	Guitar	1946–2017	Jazz fusion, jazz, free jazz, instrumental rock, progressive rock	Tony Williams Lifetime, Jean-Luc Ponty, Bill Bruford, Chad Wackerman, Jeff Berlin, Jack Bruce, Frank Gambale	As leader: Road Games (1983), Metal Fatigue (1985), Atavachron (1986), Sand (1987), Secrets (1989), Hard Hat Area (1993)
Dave Holland	Bass	1946	Jazz, jazz fusion	Miles Davis, Chick Corea, Pat Metheny, Joe Henderson, Herbie Hancock, Jack DeJohnette	
Bob Holz	Drums	1958	Jazz, jazz fusion	Larry Coryell	As leader: " Silverthorne" (2019), " Visions: Coast To Coast Connection" (2018), " Visions and Friends" (2017), " A Vision Forward" (2016)
Adam Holzman	Keyboards	1958	Jazz, jazz fusion	Miles Davis	
Hugh Hopper	Bass	1945–2009	Jazz fusion, progressive rock, experimental	Soft Machine	With Soft Machine: Third (1970), Fourth (1971), Fifth (1972), Six (1973), as leader: Hopper Tunity Box (1977)
Greg Howe	Guitar	1963	Progressive rock, instrumental rock, hard rock, jazz fusion	Dennis Chambers, Stuart Hamm, Victor Wooten, Billy Sheehan	
Freddie Hubbard	Trumpet	1938–2008	Hard-bop, soul jazz, post-bop, jazz fusion, jazz-funk	Ron Carter, Billy Cobham, Jack DeJohnette, Herbie Hancock, Joe Henderson, Keith Jarrett, Airto Moreira, Lenny White	As leader: Red Clay (1970), Straight Life (1971), First Light (1971), Sky Dive (1972)
Brian Hughes	Guitar	1955	Smooth jazz, jazz fusion, blues		
Steve Hunt	Keyboards	1958	Jazz, jazz fusion	Stanley Clarke, Allan Holdsworth	
Gary Husband	Drums	1960	Jazz, jazz fusion, progressive rock	Allan Holdsworth, John McLaughlin, Mike Stern, Jack Bruce, Billy Cobham	
J					
Anthony Jackson	Bass	1952	Jazz, jazz fusion, R&B, funk	Chick Corea, Kenny Kirkland, Al Di Meola, Mike Stern, Dave Weckl, Michal Urbaniak, Mitchel Forman, Frank Gambale	
Paul Jackson	Bass	1947–2021	Jazz, jazz funk, jazz fusion, funk	Herbie Hancock, The Headhunters	
Keith Jarrett	Keyboards	1945	Jazz, Western classical music, jazz fusion, free improvisation	Miles Davis, Jack DeJohnette, Chick Corea	As leader: Expectations (1972), with Miles Davis: The Cellar Door Sessions 1970 (2005)
Alphonso Johnson	Bass	1951	Jazz, jazz fusion, funk	Weather Report, Billy Cobham, Kenny Kirkland	
Jimmy Johnson	Bass	1956	Jazz, jazz fusion, rock, folk rock	Allan Holdsworth, Planet X	
Percy Jones	Bass	1947	Jazz fusion, avant-garde jazz	Brand X, Soft Machine	With Brand X: Unorthodox Behaviour (1976), Moroccan Roll (1977)
K					
Ryo Kawasaki	Guitar	1947	Jazz fusion	Kenny Kirkland, Teruo Nakamura, Gil Evans, Elvin Jones, Chico Hamilton, Steve Gadd, Michael Brecker, Steve Grossman, Dave Liebman, Anthony Jackson, Harvey Mason, George Benson	
Steve Khan	Guitar	1947	Jazz, jazz fusion	Brecker Brothers, Joe Zawinul, Larry Coryell, Dave Weckl, Dennis Chambers, Anthony Jackson, Kenny Kirkland, John Patitucci, Jack DeJohnette, Brent Fischer	
Benjamin Kheng	Guitar	1990	Jazz, jazz fusion, progressive rock, funk, bebop, post bop, hard bop	Dick Lee, Jeremy Monteiro	With The Sam Willows: Take Heart (2016)
Masabumi Kikuchi	Keyboards	1939–2015	Avant-garde jazz, hard bop, jazz fusion	Al Foster, Steve Grossman, Dave Liebman, Reggie Lucas, Airto Moreira, Sam Morrison, James Mtume	As leader: Poo-Sun (1970), All About Dancing Mist (1971), Susto (1981), One-Way Traveller (1982), with Kochi: Wishes (1976)
Himiko Kikuchi	Keyboards	1953	Jazz, Jazz Fusion	Bingo Miki & the Inner Galaxy Orchestra, Takuro Yoshida, Tsunehiko Kamijō, Mayumi Itsuwa	As Leader: Don't Be Stupid (Continental, 1980), Flashing (Continental, 1981), All Right (Continental, 1982), Woman (Continental, 1983), Reverse It (Continental, 1984), 森羅万象 (Continental, 1985), Flying Beagle (CBS/Sony, 1987), Sevilla Breeze (CBS/Sony, 1988), Beam (RCA, 1993)
Scott Kinsey	Keyboards		Jazz fusion	Scott Henderson, Gary Willis, Kirk Covington, Tribal Tech	
Kenny Kirkland	Keyboards	1955–1998	Jazz, electro fusion, jazz fusion, hard bop, neo bop, post bop, funk, R&B, rock	Michal Urbaniak, Miroslav Vitous, George Duke, Herbie Hancock, Tony Williams, Brecker Brothers, Jaco Pastorius, Teruo Nakamura, Terumasa Hino, Ryo Kawasaki, Gil Evans, Stanley Clarke, Ursula Dudziak, Carla Bley, Crosby, Stills, Nash & Young, Dizzy Gillespie, Ron Carter, Hubert Laws, Pat LaBarbera, Marcus Miller, Tito Puente, Wynton Marsalis, Branford Marsalis	
Wayne Krantz	Guitar	1956	Jazz fusion	Michael Brecker, Billy Cobham, Dennis Chambers, Anthony Jackson	
L					
Abraham Laboriel	Bass	1947	Jazz fusion, jazz-funk, Latin jazz	Koinonia, Alex Acuña, Justo Almario	
Tim Landers	Bass	1956	Jazz fusion	Steve Smith, Vital Information, Mike Stern, Al Di Meola, Michael Brecker, Billy Cobham, Frank Gambale	
Shawn Lane	Guitar	1963–2003	Instrumental rock, jazz fusion, world fusion	Jonas Hellborg	
Dave Liebman	Saxophone	1946	Jazz, jazz fusion	John Abercrombie, Miles Davis, Masabumi Kikuchi, John Scofield	As leader: Lookout Farm (1974)
Didier Lockwood	Violin	1956	Jazz fusion, post-bop, jazz	Surya, Tony Williams, Magma, Vladislav Sendecki, ZAO, Michal Urbaniak	
Kiko Loureiro	Guitar	1972	Heavy metal, power metal, thrash metal, jazz fusion	Virgil Donati, Yaniel Matos, Cuca Teixeira, Neural Code	
Jeff Lorber	Keyboards	1952	Smooth jazz, jazz pop, crossover jazz, jazz fusion	The Jeff Lorber Fusion, Chick Corea, Joe Farrell, Randy Brecker, Dave Weckl	
Steve Lukather	Guitar	1957	Hard rock, pop rock, progressive rock, jazz fusion	El Grupo, Jan Hammer, Larry Carlton	
M					
Tony MacAlpine	Guitar	1960	Instrumental rock, neo-classical metal, jazz fusion, heavy metal, progressive metal, hard rock	CAB, Planet X	
Alex Machacek	Guitar	1972	Jazz, jazz fusion, experimental	Terry Bozzio, BPM, Planet X	
Mike Mainieri	Vibraphone	1938	Jazz fusion, post-bop	Steps Ahead, Michael Brecker, Steve Gadd, Kenny Kirkland, Mike Stern, Steve Smith	As leader: Journey Thru an Electric Tube (1968), White Elephant (1972), Free Smiles (1978), Love Play (1977), Wanderlust (1981), An American Diary (1995), Live at the Seventh Avenue South (1996), An American Diary: The Dreamings (1997), Northern Lights (2006), with Billy Cobham: Simplicity of Expression: Depth of Thought (1978), with Steve Khan: The Blue Man (1978), with Dave Liebman: What It Is (1980), with Kazumi Watanabe: To Chi Ka (1980), Dogatana (1981), One for All (1999), with Steps Ahead: Step by Step (1980), Smokin' in the Pit (1981), Paradox (1982), Steps Ahead (1983), Modern Times (1984), Magnetic (1986), N.Y.C. (1989), Yin-Yang (1992), Live in Tokyo 1986 (1994), Vibe (1995), with Marcus Miller: Suddenly (1983), with Andy Summers: World Gone Strange (1991)
Harvey Mason	Drums	1947	Jazz-funk, hard bop, crossover jazz, jazz fusion	Herbie Hancock, The Headhunters, Brecker Brothers, Kenny Kirkland	
Bennie Maupin	Saxophone	1940	Post bop, jazz fusion	Miles Davis, Herbie Hancock, The Headhunters, Jack DeJohnette, Mike Clark	
Lyle Mays	Keyboards	1953	Jazz, jazz fusion	Pat Metheny	
Marilyn Mazur	Percussion	1955	Jazz, jazz fusion	Miles Davis, Wayne Shorter	
Christian McBride	Bass	1972	Jazz, jazz fusion	Five Peace Band, Chick Corea, John McLaughlin, Pat Metheny, Vinnie Colaiuta	
John McLaughlin	Guitar	1942	Jazz fusion, jazz, world fusion, post-bop	Miles Davis, Tony Williams Lifetime, Mahavishnu Orchestra, Al Di Meola, Trio of Doom, Shakti	As leader: My Goal's Beyond (1971), Love Devotion Surrender (1973), with Mahavishnu Orchestra: The Inner Mounting Flame (1971), Birds of Fire (1972), Between Nothingness and Eternity (1973), The Lost Trident Sessions (1973), Apocalypse (1974), Visions of the Emerald Beyond (1975)
Pat Metheny	Guitar	1954	Jazz, jazz fusion, world fusion, post-bop, jazz-rock, jazz-pop, crossover jazz	Pat Metheny Group, Gary Burton, Chick Corea, Dave Holland, Kenny Kirkland, Jaco Pastorius, John Scofield, Jack DeJohnette, Herbie Hancock, Michael Brecker	As leader: Bright Size Life (1976), Watercolors (1977), Pat Metheny Group (1978), American Garage (1979)
Barry Miles	Keyboards	1947	Jazz, jazz fusion	Al Di Meola, John Abercrombie	
Marcus Miller	Bass	1959	Jazz, jazz fusion, R&B, rock, funk	Brecker Brothers, Miles Davis, Kenny Kirkland, Mike Mainieri, Harvey Mason, Wayne Shorter, Tony Williams, Herbie Hancock, George Duke, Chick Corea, Stanley Clarke, Victor Wooten, Vladislav Sendecki, SMV	
Mike Miller	Guitar	1953	Jazz, jazz fusion, rock, pop	Chick Corea Elektric Band, Chad Wackerman	
Mitch Mitchell	Drums	1947–2008	Rock, psychedelic rock, hard rock, jazz fusion	Jack Bruce, Larry Coryell	
Adonis Mitzelos	Guitar	1961	world fusion, jazz fusion, Progressive rock, psychedelic rock	Scott Ambush, Tom Schuman, Joel Rosenblatt, Arto Tunçboyacıyan, Ara Dinkjian, Scott Kreitzer, PLJ Band	Beyond the Light
Patrick Moraz	Keyboards	1948	Progressive rock, electronic, jazz fusion	Chick Corea, Bill Bruford	
Airto Moreira	Drums	1941	Jazz, jazz fusion, world fusion	Joe Zawinul, Wayne Shorter, Chick Corea, Return to Forever, Dave Holland, Jack DeJohnette, John McLaughlin, Keith Jarrett, Kenny Kirkland, Al Di Meola, Zakir Hussain, George Duke	As leader: Free (1972)
Steve Morse	Guitar	1954	Progressive rock, hard rock, heavy metal, jazz fusion	Dixie Dregs, Jerry Goodman	
Alphonse Mouzon	Drums	1948-2016	Jazz, jazz fusion	Weather Report, The Eleventh House, Miles Davis, Larry Coryell, Patrick Moraz, Al Di Meola, Wayne Shorter, Herbie Hancock, Kenny Kirkland, Jaco Pastorius	As leader: Mind Transplant (1975)
Idris Muhammad	Drums	1939–2014	Jazz, jazz funk, crossover jazz	John Scofield	As leader: Power of Soul (1974), House of the Rising Sun (1976)
N					
Teruo Nakamura	Bass	1942	Avant-garde jazz, jazz fusion	Michael Brecker, Randy Brecker, Barry Finnerty, Steve Gadd, Steve Grossman, Marcus Miller, Alphonse Mouzon, Lenny White	As leader: Unicorn (1973), Rising Sun (1976), Route 80 (1981), Super Friends (1985)
P					
Alan Pasqua	Keyboards	1952	Rock, hard rock, jazz, jazz fusion	Tony Williams, Allan Holdsworth	With The New Tony Williams Lifetime: Believe It (1975), Million Dollar Legs (1976), with Allan Holdsworth: Metal Fatigue (1985), Atavachron (1986), Sand (1987), Secrets (1989), with Allan Holdsworth, Jimmy Haslip and Chad Wackerman: Blues for Tony (2010)
Jaco Pastorius	Bass	1951–1987	Jazz, jazz fusion, big band	Weather Report, Herbie Hancock, Kenny Kirkland, Pat Metheny, Trio of Doom, Flora Purim, Airto Moreira, Al Di Meola, Vladislav Sendecki, Mike Stern, Biréli Lagrène	As leader: Jaco Pastorius (1976)
John Patitucci	Bass	1959	Jazz, jazz fusion	Chick Corea, Wayne Shorter, Herbie Hancock, John Abercrombie, Michael Brecker, Randy Brecker, Tony Williams, Airto Moreira, Flora Purim, Chick Corea Elektric Band	
Nicholas Payton	Trumpet	1973	Jazz, jazz fusion	Chick Corea, The Headhunters	
Simon Phillips	Drums	1957	Hard rock, heavy metal, jazz fusion, jazz	Jack Bruce, Jeff Beck, RMS	
Frank Pilato	Guitar	1982	Jazz fusion, Avant-garde jazz, Classical Music, Rock	Jeff Berlin, Gary Willis, Mitchel Forman, Dave Carpenter	
Chris Poland	Guitar	1957	Thrash metal, instrumental rock, jazz fusion, progressive metal	OHM	
Jean-Luc Ponty	Violin	1942	Jazz, jazz fusion, bebop	John McLaughlin, Mahavishnu Orchestra, Frank Zappa, Al Di Meola, Kenny Kirkland, Stanley Clarke, Bela Fleck, Return to Forever	As leader: Imaginary Voyage (1976), Enigmatic Ocean (1977), Cosmic Messenger (1978)
Chris Potter	Saxophone	1971	Post-bop, jazz, jazz fusion	Wayne Krantz, Mike Mainieri, Dave Holland, Kenny Kirkland, John Patitucci, Jack DeJohnette, John Scofield	
Julian Priester	Trombone	1935	Avant-garde jazz, jazz-funk, jazz fusion, post-bop	Leon "Ndugu" Chancler, Eric Gravatt, Dave Holland, Herbie Hancock, Pat Metheny, Sun Ra, Billy Cobham	As leader: Love, Love (1974), with Herbie Hancock: Mwandishi (1970), Crossings (1972), Sextant (1973), V.S.O.P. (1977), with Billy Cobham: Inner Conflicts (1978), with Sun Ra: Lanquidity (1978)
Flora Purim	Vocals	1942	Jazz, jazz fusion, world fusion	Return to Forever, Airto Moreira, Chick Corea, George Duke, Alphonso Johnson	As leader: Butterfly Dreams (1973)
R					
Mike Ratledge	Keyboards	1943	Psychedelic rock, progressive rock, jazz fusion	Soft Machine	With Soft Machine: Third (1970), Fourth (1971), Fifth (1972), Six (1973), Seven (1973), Bundles (1975), Softs (1976)
Terje Rypdal	Guitar	1947	Jazz, jazz fusion	Jack DeJohnette, Kenny Kirkland, Miroslav Vitous, Jean-Luc Ponty	As leader: Terje Rypdal (1971)
S					
Carlos Santana	electric Guitar	1947	Latin rock, rock, blues rock, funk, jazz fusion, salsa, pop, free jazz	John McLaughlin, Don Alias, Larry Young, Billy Cobham, Jan Hammer, Tom Coster	With Santana: Caravanserai (1972), Welcome (1973), Lotus (1974), Borboletta (1974), collaboration with John McLaughlin: Love Devotion Surrender (1973)
Gar Samuelson	Drums	1958–1999	Jazz fusion, heavy metal, speed metal, thrash metal	Chris Poland, Robertino "Pag" Pagliari	
John Scofield	Guitar	1951	Jazz, jazz fusion	Miles Davis, Billy Cobham, George Duke, Dennis Chambers, Jack DeJohnette, Kenny Kirkland, Pat Metheny, Mike Stern	With Miles Davis: Star People (1983)
Tom Scott	Saxophone	1948	Post bop, jazz pop, crossover jazz, smooth jazz, jazz fusion	Jaco Pastorius, Alphonse Mouzon, Stanley Clarke, Kenny Kirkland, Tony Williams, John Patitucci, Randy Brecker	
Vladislav Sendecki	Keyboards	1970	Jazz, jazz fusion, jazz-funk, electro funk, funk, bebop, post bop, hard bop, progressive jazz, classical music, avant-garde jazz, electronica, progressive rock, film score, theatre, world fusion, world music	Alex Acuña, Victor Bailey, Till Brönner, Brecker Brothers, Philip Catherine, Mino Cinelu, Billy Cobham, Larry Coryell, Klaus Doldinger, Urszula Dudziak, Mike Gibbs, Peter Herbolzheimer, Gary Husband, Al Jarreau, Quincy Jones, Biréli Lagrène, Nils Landgren, Didier Lockwood, Bobby McFerrin, Charlie Mariano, Vince Mendoza, Marcus Miller, Airto Moreira, Nils Petter Molvaer, Zbigniew Namysłowski, Mike Oldfield, Jaco Pastorius, Maria Schneider, Lew Soloff, Tomasz Stanko, Markus Stockhausen, Jarek Śmietana, Colin Towns, Lenny White, Buster Williams, Michał Urbaniak	
Derek Sherinian	Keyboards	1966	Progressive metal, progressive rock, jazz fusion	Planet X, Tony MacAlpine, Simon Phillips, Steve Lukather, Al Di Meola, Dream Theater	
Wayne Shorter	Saxophone	1933-2023	Jazz, crossover jazz, post-bop, hard bop, jazz fusion	Miles Davis, Weather Report, Herbie Hancock, Kenny Kirkland, Tony Williams, Jaco Pastorius, Marcus Miller, Joe Zawinul	As leader: Native Dancer (1975), with Miles Davis: Filles de Kilimanjaro (1969), In a Silent Way (1969), Bitches Brew (1970), Miles Davis at Fillmore: Live at the Fillmore East (1970), Big Fun (1974), Live-Evil (1971), with Joe Zawinul: Zawinul (1971), with Weather Report: Weather Report (1971), I Sing the Body Electric (1972), Live in Tokyo (1972), Sweetnighter (1973), Mysterious Traveller (1974), Tale Spinnin' (1975), Black Market (1976), Heavy Weather (1977), Mr. Gone (1978), 8:30 (1979), Procession (1983), Domino Theory (1984), Sportin' Life (1985), This Is This! (1986), with Herbie Hancock: Man-Child (1975), with Jaco Pastorius: Jaco Pastorius (1976), Word of Mouth (1981), with Marcus Miller: The Sun Don't Lie (1993)
Steve Smith	Drums	1954	Jazz, jazz fusion, post-bop, rock	Vital Information, Steps Ahead, Jean-Luc Ponty, Larry Coryell, Victor Wooten, Mike Stern, Randy Brecker, Scott Henderson, Frank Gambale, Tony MacAlpine, Allan Holdsworth, Stanley Clarke	
Peter Sprague	Guitar	1955	Jazz, jazz fusion	Chick Corea, Pat Metheney	
Jeremy Steig	Flute	1942	Jazz, jazz fusion	Jan Hammer, Eddie Gómez	
Mike Stern	Guitar	1953	Jazz, jazz fusion, post-bop	Miles Davis, Brecker Brothers, Peter Erskine, John Patitucci, Jack DeJohnette, Don Alias, Kenny Kirkland, Dennis Chambers, Richard Bona, Kenny Garrett, Bela Fleck, Steps Ahead, Bunny Brunel, Jaco Pastorius, Cristiano Parato	
Dave Stewart	Keyboards	1950	Progressive rock, jazz fusion	Bill Bruford	
Daryl Stuermer	Guitar	1952	Progressive rock, jazz fusion	Jean-Luc Ponty, George Duke, Kenny Kirkland	
Andy Summers	Guitar	1942	Progressive rock, jazz fusion, post-punk, new wave, reggae	Soft Machine	
T					
Masayoshi Takanaka	Guitar	1953	Jazz fusion, Jazz, Pop, City Pop, Rock, Samba	Sadistic Mika Band, Takanaka	As Leader: Seychelles (1976), Takanaka (1977), An Insatiable High (1977), Brazilian Skies (1978), On Guitar (1978), Jolly Jive (1979), T-Wave (1980), Finger Dancin' (1980), The Rainbow Goblins (1981), Alone (1981), Saudade (1982), Can I Sing? (1983), 夏・全・開 (Open All Summer) (1984), Traumatic - Far Eastern Detectives (1985), Jungle Jane (1986), Rendez-Vous (1987), Sweet Noiz Magic (1987), Hot Pepper (1988), Gaps! (1989), Nail the Pocket (1990), Ballade (1991), Fade to Blue (1992), Aquaplanet (1993), Wood Chopper's Ball (1994), Guitar Wonder (1996), The White Goblin (1997), Bahama (1998), Walkin' (1999), Hunpluged (2000), Guitar Dream (2001), The Moon Rose (2002), Surf & Turf (2004), Sadistic Takanaka (2006), Summer Road (2009), Karuizawa Daydream (2010), Ukulele Seychelles (2011), 40th Year Rainbow (2011)
Roberto Tola	Guitar	1966	Jazz, Smooth Jazz, Jazz Fusion, Latin Jazz	Billy Cobham, Bob Mintzer, Eric Marienthal	As Leader: Bein' Green (2017), Colors (2020), Kon Tiki (2021), Under The Leo Sign (2023)
Jannick Top	Bass	1947	Jazz fusion	Magma, Didier Lockwood	
David Torn	Guitar	1953	Jazz fusion, avant-garde jazz	Bill Bruford	
U					
Hiromi Uehara	Keyboards	1979	Jazz, jazz fusion, post-bop	Simon Phillips, Anthony Jackson, Chick Corea, Stanley Clarke	As leader: Another Mind (2003), Brain (2004), Spiral (2005), Time Control (2007), Beyond Standard (2008), Voice (2011), Move (2012)
Michal Urbaniak	Violin	1943	Jazz, jazz fusion	Larry Coryell, Miles Davis, Kenny Kirkland, Didier Lockwood, Anthony Jackson, Vladislav Sendecki	
V					
Miroslav Vitouš	Bass	1947	Jazz, jazz fusion, jazz funk	Chick Corea, Weather Report, Joe Zawinul, Jack DeJohnette, Jan Hammer, Kenny Kirkland, Miles Davis, Wayne Shorter	As leader: Infinite Search (1970), with Larry Coryell: Spaces (1970), Planet End (1975), with Joe Zawinul: Zawinul (1971), with Weather Report: Weather Report (1971), I Sing the Body Electric (1972), Live in Tokyo (1972), Sweetnighter (1973), Mysterious Traveller (1974), with Flora Purim: Stories to Tell (1974), with Terje Rypdal and Jack DeJohnette: Terje Rypdal / Miroslav Vitous / Jack DeJohnette (1978), To Be Continued (1981)
W					
Chad Wackerman	Drums	1960	Jazz fusion, jazz, rock	Frank Zappa, Allan Holdsworth, John Patitucci	
Kazumi Watanabe	Guitar	1953	Jazz, jazz fusion	Bill Bruford, Kenny Kirkland, Wayne Shorter, Patrick Moraz, Marcus Miller, Richard Bona, Peter Erskine, Mike Mainieri	
Sadao Watanabe	Saxophone	1933	Jazz, jazz fusion	Jack DeJohnette, Miroslav Vitous, Chick Corea, George Duke, Kenny Kirkland, Kazumi Watanabe, Tony Williams, Marcus Miller, Nicholas Payton	As leader Round Trip (1970)
Dave Weckl	Drums	1960	Jazz, jazz fusion, Latin jazz, post-bop	Anthony Jackson, Chick Corea, Mike Stern, Cristiano Parato	
Steve Weingart	Keyboards	1966	Jazz, jazz fusion, funk	Virgil Donati, Robben Ford, Frank Gambale, Steve Lukather, Tony MacAlpine, Mike Miller, Simon Phillips, John Patitucci, Dave Weckl, Victor Wooten	
Lenny White	Drums	1949	Jazz, jazz fusion	Miles Davis, Return to Forever, Al Di Meola, Jaco Pastorius, Stanley Clarke, Brecker Brothers, Chick Corea, Kenny Kirkland, Marcus Miller, Michal Urbaniak, Larry Coryell, Vladislav Sendecki	
Gary Willis	Bass	1957	Jazz, jazz fusion	Scott Henderson, Kirk Covington, Tribal Tech, Allan Holdsworth, Dennis Chambers, Wayne Shorter	With Allan Holdsworth: Metal Fatigue (1985), with Tribal Tech: Tribal Tech (1991), Illicit (1992), Face First (1993), Thick (1999), Rocket Science (2000), X (2012), with Dennis Chambers: Outbreak (2002)
Tony Williams	Drums	1945–1997	Jazz, jazz fusion	Miles Davis, The Tony Williams Lifetime, John McLaughlin, Larry Young, Jack Bruce, Allan Holdsworth, Jaco Pastorius, Stanley Clarke, Herbie Hancock, Kenny Kirkland, Wayne Shorter, Marcus Miller	With The Tony Williams Lifetime: Emergency! (1969), Turn It Over (1970), with The New Tony Williams Lifetime: Believe It (1975), Million Dollar Legs (1976)
Victor Wooten	Bass	1964	Jazz, jazz fusion	Béla Fleck and the Flecktones, Vital Tech Tones, SMV, Chick Corea Elektric Band, Larry Coryell	With Béla Fleck and the Flecktones: Béla Fleck and the Flecktones (1990), Flight of the Cosmic Hippo (1991)
Robert Wyatt	Drums	1945	Jazz fusion, progressive rock, experimental rock	Soft Machine	With Soft Machine: Third (1970), Fourth (1971)
Y					
Larry Young	Keyboards	1940–1998	Jazz, jazz fusion	Miles Davis, John McLaughlin, Tony Williams, Joe Henderson, Lenny White	With The Tony Williams Lifetime: Emergency! (1969), with John McLaughlin: Devotion (1969), Love Devotion Surrender (1973), with Miles Davis: Bitches Brew (1970)
Z					
Frank Zappa	Guitar	1940–1993	Progressive rock, jazz fusion, classical, avant-garde, computer music	Randy Brecker, George Duke, Jean-Luc Ponty, Chad Wackerman, Jack Bruce, Kenny Kirkland	As leader: Hot Rats (1969), Waka/Jawaka (1972), The Grand Wazoo (1972)
Joe Zawinul	Keyboards	1932–2007	Jazz, jazz fusion, world fusion music	Miles Davis, Weather Report, Wayne Shorter, Chick Corea, Herbie Hancock, Kenny Kirkland, Jaco Pastorius, Alphonso Johnson, Peter Erskine	As leader: Zawinul (1971), Di•a•lects (1986), World Tour (1998), Faces & Places (2002), Brown Street (2007), with Miles Davis: In a Silent Way (1969), Bitches Brew (1970), Miles Davis at Fillmore: Live at the Fillmore East (1970), Live-Evil (1971), Big Fun (1974), with Weather Report: Weather Report (1971), I Sing the Body Electric (1972), Live in Tokyo (1972), Sweetnighter (1973), Mysterious Traveller (1974), Tale Spinnin' (1975), Black Market (1976), Heavy Weather (1977), Mr. Gone (1978), 8:30 (1979), Weather Report (1982 album) (1982), Procession (1983), Domino Theory (1984), Sportin' Life (1985), This Is This! (1986)

== Bassists ==
- Steve Bailey
- Victor Bailey
- Jeff Berlin
- Richard Bona
- Brian Bromberg
- Jack Bruce (1943–2014)
- Bunny Brunel
- Tony Bunn (born 1957)
- Alain Caron
- Stanley Clarke
- Jimmy Earl
- Mark Egan
- Brent Fischer
- Jimmy Haslip
- Anthony Jackson
- Paul Jackson
- Alphonso Johnson
- Percy Jones
- Abraham Laboriel
- Tim Landers
- Dave LaRue
- Marcus Miller
- John Myung
- Teruo Nakamura
- Jaco Pastorius (1951–1987)
- John Patitucci
- Tetsuo Sakurai
- Sandra Riley Tang
- Jannick Top
- Miroslav Vitouš
- Oytun Ersan
- Tal Wilkenfeld
- Gary Willis
- Victor Wooten

== Drummers and percussionists ==
- Dennis Chambers
- Billy Cobham
- Bill Bruford
- Chad Szeliga
- Jonathan Chua
- Vinnie Colaiuta
- Kirk Covington
- Jack DeJohnette
- Joe DeRenzo
- Virgil Donati
- Peter Erskine
- Danny Gottlieb
- Trilok Gurtu
- Omar Hakim
- Bob Holz
- Gary Husband
- Akira Jimbo
- Narelle Kheng
- Harvey Mason
- Marilyn Mazur
- Mitch Mitchell (1947–2008)
- Airto Moreira
- Alphonse Mouzon
- Simon Phillips
- Gar Samuelson (1958–1999)
- Steve Smith
- Christian Vander
- Chad Wackerman
- Dave Weckl
- Lenny White
- Tony Williams (1945–1997)
- Robert Wyatt

== Guitarists ==
- John Abercrombie
- Masahiro Andoh
- Gustavo Assis-Brasil
- Jennifer Batten
- Jeff Beck
- Walter Becker
- Tommy Bolin (1951–1976)
- Hiram Bullock
- Larry Carlton
- Bill Connors
- Larry Coryell
- Torsten de Winkel
- Al Di Meola
- Orhan Demir
- Barry Finnerty
- Robben Ford
- Russ Freeman
- Bill Frisell
- Frank Gambale
- John Goodsall
- Guthrie Govan
- Nathan Hartono
- Scott Henderson
- Allan Holdsworth
- Greg Howe
- Brian Hughes
- Ryo Kawasaki
- Gideon King
- Kaki King (Some jazz fusion recordings)
- Steve Khan
- Benjamin Kheng
- Wayne Krantz
- Shawn Lane (1963–2003)
- Kiko Loureiro
- Steve Lukather
- Tony MacAlpine
- Alex Machacek
- John McLaughlin
- Pat Metheny
- Mike Miller
- Gary Moore
- Steve Morse
- Issei Noro
- Chris Poland
- Lee Ritenour
- Roberto Tola
- Terje Rypdal
- John Scofield
- Peter Sprague
- Mike Stern
- Daryl Stuermer
- Andy Summers
- David Torn
- Masayoshi Takanaka
- Kazumi Watanabe
- Gábor Szabó
- Frank Zappa (1940–1993)

== Keyboardists ==
- Brian Auger
- Louis Banks
- Chick Corea
- Tom Coster
- Eumir Deodato
- George Duke
- Donald Fagen
- Russell Ferrante
- Clare Fischer
- Mitchel Forman
- Jan Hammer
- Herbie Hancock
- Adam Holzman
- Steve Hunt
- Bob James
- Keith Jarrett
- Scott Kinsey
- Himiko Kikuchi
- Kenny Kirkland (1955–1998)
- Simon Kiselicki
- Jeff Lorber
- Lyle Mays
- Barry Miles
- Patrick Moraz
- Mike Ratledge
- Vladislav Sendecki
- Derek Sherinian
- Ruslan Sirota
- Dave Stewart
- Hiromi Uehara
- Steve Weingart
- Joe Zawinul (1932–2007)
- Minoru Mukaiya

== Saxophonists ==
- Gato Barbieri (1932–2016)
- Michael Brecker (1949–2007)
- Elton Dean (1945–2006)
- Joe Farrell (1937–1986)
- Kenny Garrett
- Steve Grossman
- Joe Henderson (1937–2001)
- Ron Holloway
- Dave Liebman
- Eric Marienthal
- Bennie Maupin
- Bob Mintzer
- Chris Potter
- Tom Scott
- Wayne Shorter
- Dave Sanborn
- Grover Washington Jr
- Sadao Watanabe
- Kenny G

== Trumpeters and flugelhornists ==
- Randy Brecker
- Bill Chase (1934–1974)
- Miles Davis (1926–1991)
- Freddie Hubbard (1938–2008)
- Nicholas Payton
- Don Ellis (1934–1978)

== Other instruments ==
- Kinan Azmeh (clarinet)
- Gary Burton (vibraphone)
- Béla Fleck (banjo)
- Jerry Goodman (violin)
- Didier Lockwood (violin)
- Mike Mainieri (vibraphone)
- Jean-Luc Ponty (violin)
- Julian Priester (trombone)
- Zbigniew Seifert (violin)
- Jeremy Steig (flute)
- Michał Urbaniak (violin)

== Bands ==
- Aghora
- Animals as Leaders
- Animal Logic
- Arcana
- Area
- The Aristocrats
- Atheist
- Ayers Rock
- Azteca
- Ginger Baker's Air Force
- Backwater
- Begnagrad
- Blackbyrds
- Blood Sweat & Tears
- Brand X
- Bruford
- BWB
- CAB
- Caldera
- Casiopea
- Centipede
- Jimmy Chamberlin Complex
- Chicago
- Chon
- Chick Corea Elektric Band
- Colosseum
- Colosseum II
- The Crusaders
- Cynic
- Den Za Den
- Dirty Loops
- Dixie Dregs
- Dreams
- Earth Wind and Fire
- Elements
- Ephel Duath
- Farmers Market
- Fattburger
- Fer2et 3a Nota
- Fermata
- Finnforest
- Béla Fleck and the Flecktones
- Free Moral Agents
- Galactic
- Gamalon
- Gilgamesh
- Gong
- Gorguts
- Gamalon
- Garaj Mahal
- Ian Gillan Band
- Gutbucket
- Hatfield and the North
- The Headhunters
- The Heliocentrics
- Henry Cow
- Hiroshima
- Hobo
- If
- Indonesia 6
- Into The Moat
- Isis
- Isotope
- Jaga Jazzist
- Jazz Is Dead
- Jazz Q
- Journey (1973–1977 only)
- Jutro
- Kayo Dot
- Kneebody
- Koinonia
- Kostarev Group
- Korni Grupa
- Kraan
- Leb i Sol
- Lighthouse (band)
- Liquid Tension Experiment
- Lydian Collective
- Mahavishnu Orchestra
- Maneige
- Manfred Mann's Earth Band
- Manfred Mann Chapter Three
- Manteca
- Mark-Almond
- Marbin
- Matching Mole
- Dave Matthews Band
- Medeski Martin & Wood
- Mezzoforte
- Na Lepem Prijazni
- National Health
- Niacin
- Nucleus
- The Number Twelve Looks Like You
- Oko
- OHM
- OHMphrey
- Opafire
- Oregon
- Ozric Tentacles
- Pages
- Passport
- Perigeo
- Phish
- Physical Therapy
- Pierre Moerlen's Gong
- Planet X
- Predmestje
- Return to Forever
- Rippingtons
- The Sam Willows
- Santana
- SBB
- Neal Schon
- September
- Shakatak
- Shakti
- The Shuffle Demons
- Skaldowie
- The Slip
- Smak
- Snarky Puppy
- Soft Machine
- Solstice
- Spyro Gyra
- Steely Dan
- Steps Ahead
- Stimela
- T-Square
- Tako
- Ten Wheel Drive
- Thank You Scientist
- Time
- Traffic
- Tribal Tech
- United Jazz and Rock Ensemble
- Uzeb
- Vital Information
- Vital Tech Tones
- War
- Weather Report
- The Tony Williams Lifetime
- Yellowjackets
