= Dialect (disambiguation) =

A dialect is a variety of spoken or written language.

Dialect(s) may also refer to:

- Dialect continuum, a range of dialects varying at the distant ends
- Dialect (computing), a small variant of a programming language
- Di•a•lects, a 1986 album by Joe Zawinul

== See also ==
- Dialectic, a method of argument
- Eye dialect
