= Living in Paradise =

Living in Paradise may refer to:

- Vivre au paradis, a.k.a. Living in Paradise, a 1998 Algerian film
- Living in Paradise, a 1988 album by Fattburger
- Living in Paradise, a 2004 album by Jesse Colin Young
- "Living in Paradise", song by Elvis Costello from This Year's Model
