= In My Wildest Dreams (Tom Grant album) =

Studio album by Tom Grant
- Released: 1992
- Genre: Jazz
- Length: 51:39
- Label: Verve Forecast
- Producer: Tom Grant; Wayne Brathwaite

Tom Grant chronology
Edge of the World (1990)	In My Wildest Dreams (1992)	The View From Here (1993)

Professional ratings
Review scores
Source	Rating
AllMusic	2/5 stars

In My Wildest Dreams is a 1992 album by keyboardist Tom Grant featuring David Grant and Wayne Braithwaite.

== Track listing ==
All tracks are written by Tom Grant, except "I've Just Begun to Love You", written by Wayne Brathwaite

No.	Title	Length
1.	"Monkey Magic"	5:59
2.	"Mambo to the Moon"	6:31
3.	"Show Me the Way"	5:18
4.	"In My Wildest Dreams"	6:22
5.	"I've Just Begun to Love You"	5:51
6.	"Time Traveler"	6:14
7.	"Squeeze and Please"	5:43
8.	"Love on Ice"	5:26
9.	"Heidi's Song"	4:15
Total length:		51:39

== Musicians ==
- Tom Grant – Keyboards, Vocals
- Phil Baker – Bass
- Dan Balmer – Guitar
- Wayne Brathwaite – Bass, Composer, Keyboards
- Sharon Bryant – Vocals
- Bruce Carter – Drums
- James Clisset – Harmonica
- Valerie Day – Percussion, Vocals
- Diane Garisto – Background Vocals
- Omar Hakim – Drums
- George Howard – Sax (Soprano)
- Bashiri Johnson – Percussion
- Curtis King – Background Vocals
- Marlon McClain – Guitar (Rhythm)
- Danny Schauffler – Sax (Soprano), Sax (Tenor)
- Terry Silverlight – Drums
- Kirk Whalum – Sax (Soprano)

== Production ==
- Tom Grant – Producer, Programming
- John Golden – Mastering
- Michael Allaire – Engineer
- Wayne Brathwaite – Producer, Programming
- Eulis Cathey – Executive Producer
- Guy Eckstine – Executive Producer
- Douglas Durbrow – Engineer, Producer
- James Clisset – Assistant Engineer
- Mitchell Kanner – Art Direction
- Anton Kimball – Illustrations

Track information and credits verified from the album's liner notes.
