= Omar Hakim =

American drummer, arranger and composer (b. 1959)

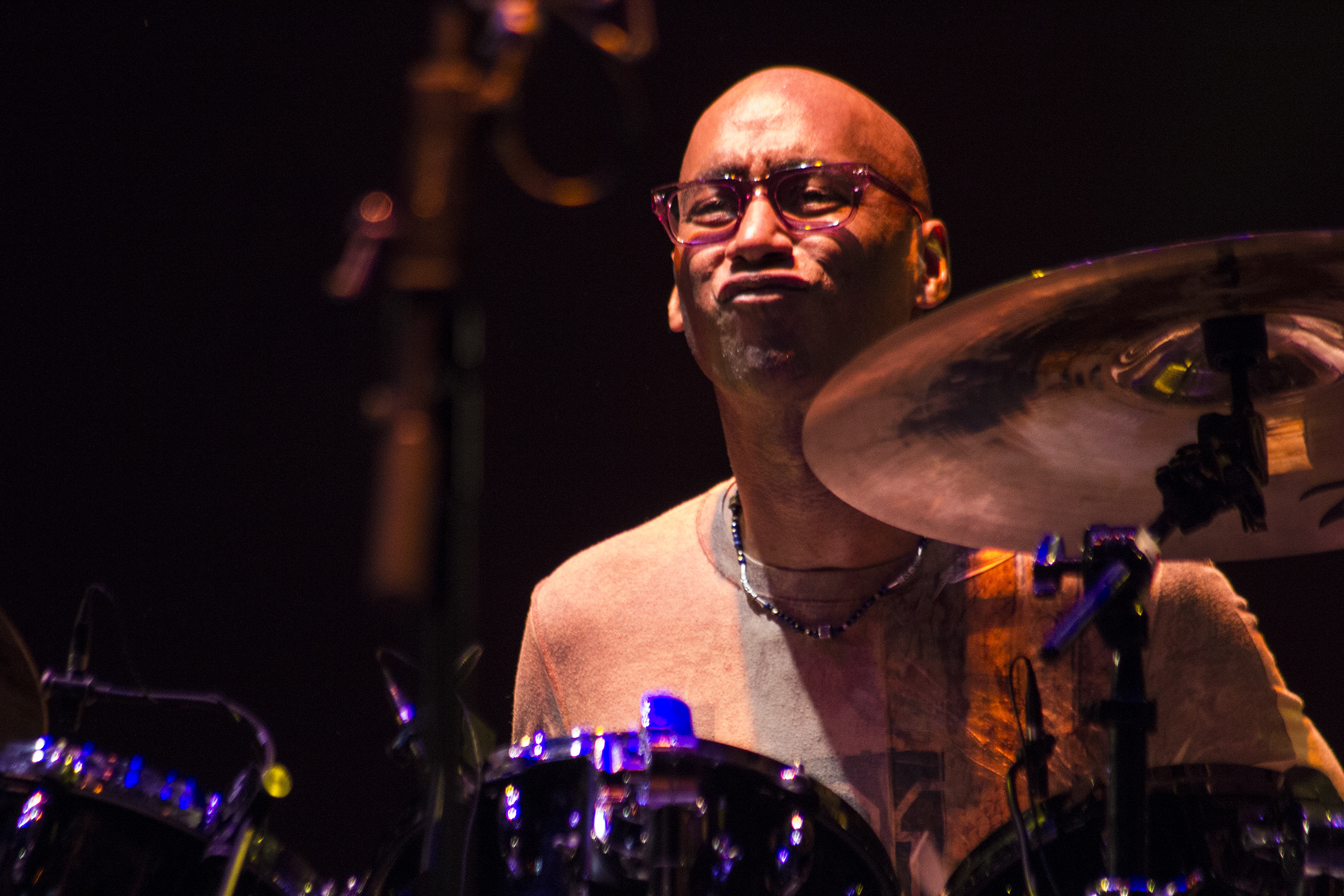
- Hakim on the drums in 2012

Background information
- Born: February 12, 1959 (age 67); New York City, New York, United States
- Genres: Jazz; jazz fusion; pop; funk; rock
- Occupations: Musician; record producer; arranger; composer
- Instruments: Drums
- Years active: 1980–present

Omar Hakim (born February 12, 1959) is an American drummer, producer, arranger and composer. His session work covers jazz, jazz fusion, and pop music. He has worked with Weather Report, David Bowie, Foo Fighters, Chic, Sting, Madonna, Dire Straits, Bryan Ferry, Journey, Kate Bush, George Benson, Miles Davis, Daft Punk, Mariah Carey, the Pussycat Dolls, David Lee Roth, Celine Dion, and Thundercat.

== Early life ==
Hakim was born in New York City on February 12, 1959. His father, Hasaan Hakim, was a trombonist. Omar started playing the drums at the age of five, and first performed in his father's band four or five years later.

== Career ==
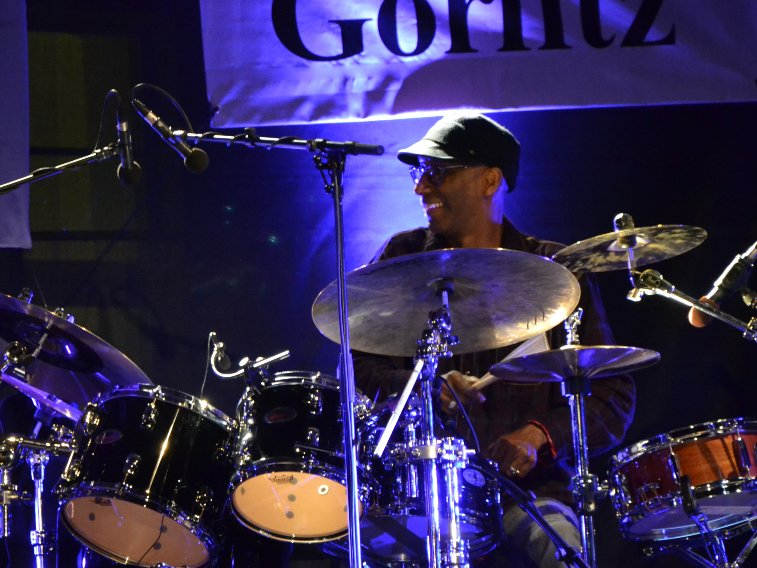
Omar Hakim performing at Jazztage Görlitz, 1 June 2012

Hakim first came to major attention backing Carly Simon in 1980, and joined Weather Report in 1982. He played drums on David Bowie's most commercially successful album, 1983's Let's Dance, as well as the follow-up, Tonight, in 1984. Bowie described Hakim as "a fascinating drummer, with impeccable timing" and "always fresh in his approach".

At the end of 1984, Hakim joined Dire Straits as drummer while recording their fifth album Brothers in Arms at the now-abandoned AIR Studios in Montserrat. Hakim temporarily replaced the band's then-permanent drummer Terry Williams, who had been sidelined and released from the recording sessions by producers Mark Knopfler and Neil Dorfsman, as his drumming performance was felt to be unsuitable for the desired sound of the album after most of the album tracks had been recorded. Hakim re-recorded all the drum tracks on the album within three days and then left for other commitments. Hakim and Williams are both credited on the album, however the drums on most tracks on the final album were performed by Hakim, apart from the hit single "Walk of Life" and the improvised drum crescendo at the beginning of "Money for Nothing". (According to another interview with Neil Dorsman, Williams played toms and tom fills throughout “Money for Nothing” and "Walk of Life", while Hakim played drums on all the remaining tracks on the album).

Hakim was also part of the band for Sting's album The Dream of the Blue Turtles, which was released in June 1985.

"By this time, Hakim was teaching himself to program drum machines, which put him in even greater demand as a pop, rock, and R&B session musician, and landed him work with Madonna." He kept working in jazz fusion, playing with Roy Ayers, George Benson, Miles Davis, Lee Ritenour, Joe Sample, David Sanborn, and John Scofield across the 1980s and 1990s. His debut album as leader, Rhythm Deep, was released in December 1989, also featured his singing, and was nominated for a Grammy Award in 1990.

In the 1990s, Hakim developed further in electronic percussion, which gave him more opportunities as a session musician: he recorded with pop stars Mariah Carey, Celine Dion, and Jewel. His jazz career had faded by the mid-1990s. His second album as leader, The Groovesmith, was released in 2000.

On June 18, 2015, Journey announced that Hakim would replace longtime drummer Deen Castronovo on their North American tour after Castronovo was arrested for domestic violence in Salem, Oregon.

Hakim was featured on the cover of Modern Drummer in 2014, and was on the cover of DrumHead in 2017.

Hakim became the Chairman of the Percussion Department of Berklee College of Music in 2017, replacing the previous Department Chair, John Ramsey.

On September 3, 2022, Hakim appeared at the Taylor Hawkins Tribute Concert at Wembley Stadium performing on sets with Nile Rodgers, Josh Homme, Chris Chaney, Gaz Combes, Geddy Lee and Alex Lifeson of Rush, Paul McCartney, Chrissie Hynde and Foo Fighters members.

== Television ==
Between 1988 and 1989 Hakim appeared regularly as the house band drummer in The Sunday Night Band during the first half season of the acclaimed music performance program Sunday Night on NBC late-night television. After being temporarily replaced by drummer J. T. Lewis for the remainder of that season, Hakim reappeared in the band for the second season in the fall of 1989, when the program returned under the new name Night Music.

== Personal life ==
Hakim is married to and performs with jazz pianist Rachel Z.

== Discography ==
=== As leader/co-leader ===
- Rhythm Deep (GRP, 1989)
- The Groovesmith (Oh Zone Entertainment, 2000)
- The Trio of OZ, The Trio of OZ (OZmosis, 2010)
- The Omar Hakim Experience, We are One (OZmosis, 2014)
- OZmosys, Eyes To The Future, Vol. 1 EP (OZmosis, 2019)

=== As a member ===
Great Jazz Trio
With Hank Jones and John Patitucci

- Stella by Starlight (Eighty-Eight's, 2006)
- July 5 th - Live at Birdland NY (Eighty-Eight's, 2007)
- July 6 th - Live at Birdland NY (Eighty-Eight's, 2007)

=== As sideman ===
With Victor Bailey

- Bottom's Up (Atlantic, 1989)
- Low Blow (Zebra, 1999)
- That's Right! (ESC, 2001)

With David Bowie

- Let's Dance (EMI America, 1983)
- Tonight (EMI America, 1984)

With Jonathan Butler

- Deliverance (GRP, 1990)
- Heal Our Land (Jive, 1990)

With Mariah Carey

- Mariah Carey (Columbia, 1990)
- Merry Christmas (Columbia, 1994)

With Chic

- Live at the Budokan (Sumthing Else Music Works, 1999) – live
- In Japan (Charly, 2002) – compilation
- A Night in Amsterdam (Universe Italy, 2006)

With Miles Davis

- Tutu (Warner Bros., 1986) – rec. 1985
- Music from Siesta (Warner Bros., 1987) – soundtrack
- Amandla (Warner Bros., 1989) – rec. 1988–1989

With Dire Straits

- Brothers in Arms (Vertigo, 1985)

With George Benson

- In Your Eyes (Warner Bros., 1983)
- Love Remembers (Warner Bros., 1993)

With Najee

- Najee's Theme (Capitol, 1986)
- Tokyo Blue (Capitol, 1990)
- Just an Illusion (Capitol, 1992)
- Love Songs (Blue Note, 2000) – compilation
- Embrace (N-Coded, 2003)

With Lee Ritenour

- Festival (GRP, 1988)
- Larry & Lee (GRP, 1995)
- World of Brazil (GRP, 2005)

With Special EFX

- Confidential (GRP, 1989)
- Double Feature (GRP, 1988)
- Just Like Magic (GRP, 1990)
- Peace of the World (GRP, 1991)
- Genesis (Shanachie, 2013)

With Joe Sample

- Spellbound (Warner Bros., 1989)
- Ashes to Ashes (Warner Bros., 1990)

With Neal Schon

- Late Nite (Columbia, 1989)
- I on U (Favored Nations Entertainment, 2005)

With Sting

- The Dream of the Blue Turtles (A&M, 1985)
- Bring On the Night (live) (A&M, 1986)

With Kazumi Watanabe

- Mobo Vol. 1 (Gramavision, 1984)
- Mobo Vol. 2 (Gramavision, 1984)

With Weather Report

- Procession (Columbia, 1983)
- Domino Theory (Columbia, 1984)
- Sportin' Life (Columbia, 1985)
- This Is This! (Columbia, 1986)
- Live and Unreleased (Columbia, 2002) – live rec. 1975–1983
- Forecast: Tomorrow (Columbia, 2006) – compilation
- Live in Cologne 1983 (Art of Groove, 2011)[2CD] – live rec. 1983

With others

- Laurie Anderson, Homeland (Nonesuch, 2010) – rec. 2007–2010
- Roy Ayers, Africa, Center of the World (Polydor, 1981)
- Philip Bailey, Inside Out (Columbia, 1986)
- Anita Baker, Giving You the Best That I Got (Elektra, 1988)
- Jay Beckenstein, Eye Contact (Windham Hill Jazz, 2000)
- Birdy, Fire Within (Atlantic, 2013)
- Richard Bona, Scenes from My Life (Columbia, 1999)
- Michael Brecker, Now You See It...Now You Don't (GRP, 1990)
- Bobby Broom, Clean Sweep (Arista GRP, 1981)
- Tom Browne, Love Approach (GRP, 1979)
- Kate Bush, Before the Dawn (Concord, 2016) – live rec. 2014
- Tracy Chapman, Matters of the Heart (Elektra, 1992)
- Judy Collins, Fires of Eden (Columbia, 1990)
- Steve Cropper, Fire It Up (Provogue, 2021)
- Céline Dion, Let's Talk About Love (Columbia, 1997)
- Jerry Douglas, Traveler (Membran, 2012)
- Will Downing, A Dream Fulfilled (Island Records, 1991)
- Will Downing, Love's the Place to Be (Mercury, 1993)
- Will Downing, Moods (Mercury, 1995)
- Urszula Dudziak, Sorrow Is Not Forever...But Love Is (Keytone, 1983)
- EOB, Earth (Capitol, 2020) – rec. 2012–2020
- Gil Evans, Lunar Eclypse (New Tone, 1992) – rec. 1981
- Everything But the Girl, The Language of Life (Atlantic, 1990)
- Foo Fighters, Medicine at Midnight (RCA, 2021) - rec. 2019-2020
- Julia Fordham, Julia Fordham (Circa, 1988)
- Peter Frampton, Premonition (Virgin, 1986)
- Bob Geldof, Deep in the Heart of Nowhere (Mercury, 1986)
- Tom Grant, In My Wildest Dreams (Verve Forecast, 1992)
- Conan Gray, Found Heaven (Republic, 2024)
- Dave Grusin, Migration (GRP, 1989)
- Sammy Hagar, I Never Said Goodbye (Geffen, 1987)
- Sophie B. Hawkins, Tongues and Tails (Columbia, 1992)
- Roger Hodgson, Hai Hai (A&M, 1987)
- Bruce Hornsby, Harbor Lights (RCA, 1993) – rec. 1992
- Toninho Horta, Foot On The Road (Verve Forecast, 1994)
- Mick Jagger, Primitive Cool (Columbia, 1987)
- Bob James, Ivory Coast (Warner Bros., 1988)
- Stanley Jordan, Magic Touch (Blue Note, 1985)
- Don Johnson, Heartbeat (Epic, 1986)
- Chaka Khan, ck (Warner Bros., 1988)
- Carole King, City Streets (Capitol, 1989)
- Dave Koz, Hello Tomorrow (Concord, 2010)
- Urban Knights, Urban Knights (GRP, 1995)
- Jennifer Lopez, The Reel Me (Epic, 2003)
- Darlene Love, Paint Another Picture (Columbia, 1990)
- Carmen Lundy, Old Devil Moon (JVC, 1997)
- Mike Mainieri, Live at Seventh Avenue South (NYC, 1996) – live
- Cheb Mami, Dellali (Virgin, 2001)
- Bobby McFerrin, Beyond Words (Blue Note, 2002)
- Al Di Meola, Kiss My Axe (Tomato, 1992)
- Marcus Miller, The Sun Don't Lie (PRA, 1993)
- The O'Jays, Emotionally Yours (EMI, 1991)
- Joan Osborne, Relish (Polydor, 1995)
- Michel Petrucciani, Playground (Blue Note, 1991)
- Daft Punk, Random Access Memories (Columbia, 2013) – rec. 2008–2012
- The Rippingtons, Curves Ahead (GRP, 1991)
- Nelson Rangell, Truest Heart (GRP, 1993)
- Lionel Richie, Louder Than Words (Mercury, 1996)
- David Lee Roth, Diamond Dave (Magna Carta, 2003)
- David Sanborn, As We Speak (Warner Bros., 1981)
- John Scofield, Still Warm (Gramavision, 1986)
- Rob Thomas, ...Something to Be (Atlantic, 2005)
- Knut Værnes Trio, Updates (Curling Legs, 2018) – rec. 2017
- Grover Washington Jr., Soulful Strut (Columbia, 1996)
- Aziza Mustafa Zadeh, Dance of fire (Columbia, 1995)
- V.A., Celebrating the Music of Weather Report (Telarc, 2000)
