= Vladislav Sendecki =

Polish jazz musician

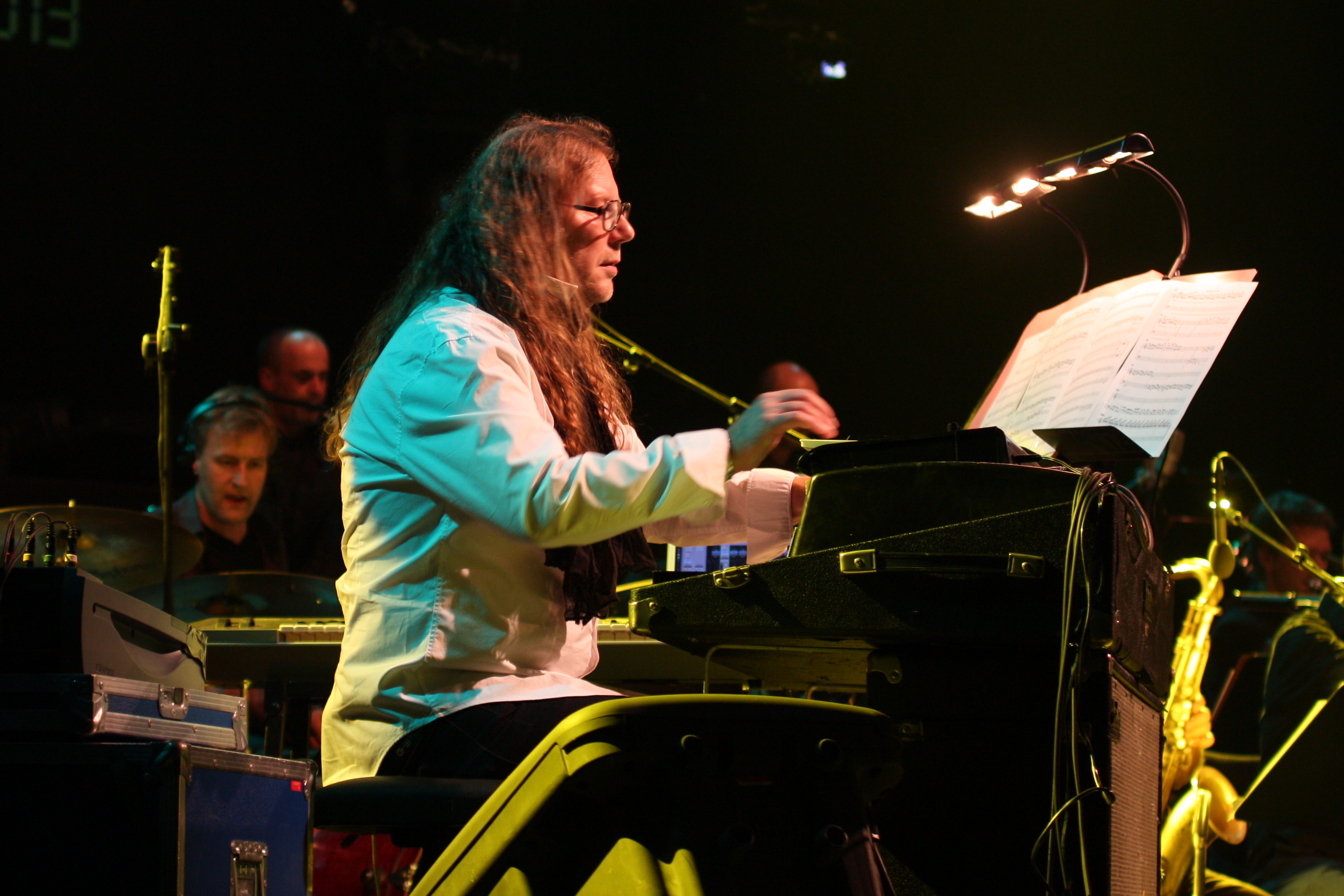
Władysław Sendecki

Vladyslav Sendecki, known as Vladislav Sendecki, (born 1955 in Gorlice) is a Polish jazz pianist. In Polish, his name is spelled Władysław Sendecki. Since 1996 he has been permanently associated with the NDR Big Band as a composer and pianist. Sendecki is one of the top five pianists in the world according to the New York Village Voice.

He has worked with Billy Cobham, Victor Bailey, Michael Brecker, Randy Brecker, Philip Catherine, Arild Andersen, Ray Anderson, Till Brönner, Joao Bosco, Cher, Mino Cinelu, Larry Coryell, Urszula Dudziak, David Gilmour, Mike Gibbs, Steve Gray, Joe Henderson, Peter Herbolzheimer, Gary Husband, Al Jarreau, Quincy Jones, Nils Landgren, Joe Lovano, Didier Lockwood, Bobby McFerrin, Charlie Mariano, Vince Mendoza, Marcus Miller, Airto Moreira, Nils Petter Molvaer, Janusz Muniak, Zbigniew Namysłowski, Mike Oldfield, Maria Schneider, Lew Soloff, Tomasz Stanko, Markus Stockhausen, Jarek Śmietana, Colin Towns, Lenny White, Buster Williams, Michał Urbaniak, Leszek Zadlo, Klaus Doldinger's Passport, Biréli Lagrène and Jaco Pastorius,

== Discography ==
- Birthday - Extra Ball, co-leader with Jarek Śmietana (Muza SX-1414, 1976)
- Aquarium Live Nr 3 - Extra Ball (Poljazz Z-SX-0671, 1977)
- Aquarium Live No. 5 - Władysław Sendecki Sun Ship (PolJazz – Z-SX 0686, Klub Płytowy PSJ - Biały Kruk Czarnego Krążka – XXVII, 1978)
- Music For My Friends - Big Band Katowice (Polskie Nagrania Muza – SX 1560, Polish Jazz – Vol. 52, 1978/Polish Jazz Deluxe - Polskie Nagrania Muza – PNCD 1052)
- Follow Us - Władysław Sendecki Sun Ship (Polskie Nagrania Muza – SX 1941, Polish Jazz – Vol. 61, 1980/Polskie Nagrania Muza – PNCD 1061, Polish Jazz Deluxe, 2006)
- 1980 - Krystyna Prońko - Jutro zaczyna się tu sezon music by Władysław Sendecki (Wifon – LP-014, MC-0146, 1980/Krystyna Prońko 72-92 Vol.2, MJM Music PL – 134M, 1992)
- Follow Your Kite - Zbigniew Namysłowski Air Condition (Polskie Nagrania Muza – SX 2303, 1980)
- Zbigniew Namysłowski – Air Condition (PolJazz – PSJ-85, 1981)
- Zbigniew Namysłowski – Air Condition (Inner City Records – IC 1130, 1981/Affinity – AFF 83, 1982)
- Recital - duo with Michał Urbaniak (Four Leaf Clover Records – FLC 5073/Tonpress - SX-T 98, 1983)
- Urbaniax – Burning Circuits with Urszula Dudziak & Michał Urbaniak (Sonet – SNTF 917, 1984)
- Polish Jazz Ensemble - Polski Jazz Ensemble - co-leader with Leszek Zadlo, feat. Janusz Stefański, Bronisław Suchanek (Poljazz – PSJ - 141, 1986)
- Stuttgart Aria with Jaco Pastorius, Bireli Lagrene, Peter Lübke (Jazzpoint Records – JP 1019, 1986)
- Listen To My Story (UBM Records – UBM 1120, 1987)
- Men from Wilnau (Antilles - 90910-1, 1988)
- Songs for Poland with Michał Urbaniak (UBX Productions Inc./Sonet – SNTF 1025, 1988)
- Jamin' (UBM Records – UBM 1125, 1988)
- Message From The Floor No. 709 with Gabriel Magos (Atmosfera Production – 01, 1989)
- Four plus Six (Jazzline – JL 11144-2, 1992)
- Wagnerama Feat. Mike Kilian – Haunted (MCA Records - MCD 32888, 1994)
- Stay By My Side/Various - Stars '95 (MCA Records - MCD 32346, 1995)
- Mike Kilian - Ice Age (MCA Records - MCD 32666, 1995)
- Seelenlandschaften feat. Joachim-Ernst Berendt, Philip Catherine, (Audio (7) - 8759, 1997)
- Like a Bird (Audio Bauer Musikverlag – 4018489087890, 2000)
- Milster - Angelika Milster & The Berlin International Orchestra (Electrola – 7243 5 41841 2 3, EMI – 7243 5 41841 2 3, 2002)
- Opus Absolutum feat. Charlie Mariano, Vitold Rek, Martin France (Taso Music Production - TMP CD 509, 2003)
- A Tribute to Raymond Scott (Herzog Records, 2005)
- Poetic Jazz - Danzarina with Lech and Pawel Wieleba, Jan-Peter Klöpfel (PJRecords, 2005)
- Piano (Provocateur Records - PVC1039, 2007)
- Electric Treasures with Markus Stockhausen, Arild Andersen, Patrice Héral (Aktivraum - AR 10107, 2008)
- Solo Piano at Schloss Elmau (ACT - ACT 9485-2, 2010)
- Vladyslav Sendecki/Atom String Quartet: Le Jardin Oublié / My Polish Heart (Neuklang - NLP4202, 2018)
- Vladyslav Sendecki & Jürgen Spiegel: Two In The Mirror (Skip Records - 8954583, 2019)
