= Grannies on Safari =

US television program

- Written by: Regina S. Fraser; Pat A. Johnson
- Starring: Regina S. Fraser; Pat A. Johnson
- Theme music composer: Orbert Davis, Individual episode compositions by Allan Phillips
- Country of origin: United States
- Original language: English
- No. of seasons: 3 (Season 4 coming mid-2013)
- No. of episodes: 19 (additional 9 coming mid-2013)

Production
- Producers: Regina S. Fraser; Pat A. Johnson; Tracye Campbell (2008); Maria Dugandzic-Pasic (2012)
- Production locations: Chicago, Illinois
- Running time: 30 minutes including opening and closing credits
- Production companies: The Art Explorers, Brave New World, Luminair Media

Original release
- Network: PBS; Travel Channel International
- Release: May 1, 2006

Grannies on Safari is a travel program syndicated in the U.S. with hosts Regina S. Fraser and Pat A. Johnson. The program began airing in 2006 on Chicago's WTTW. Soon after, it was syndicated internationally by the UK Travel Channel and has been seen in over 117 countries and heard in 16 languages. The most recent third season can be viewed in over 300 PBS stations and on APT digital channel Create TV in the U.S.

== Show overview ==
The Grannies on Safari is hosted by intrepid travelers Regina Stewart Fraser and Pat Anita Johnson. The English-language program focuses on international cultural, artistic and culinary interchange in off-the-beaten-path places in urban and rural settings. Both hosts are particularly interested in women's empowerment activities. The program provides a visual outlet to acquaint viewers with the exceptional products and activities of women who economically sustain themselves and their villages with their arts and crafts.

The following countries have been featured in the Grannies on Safari program: Antigua, Argentina, Barbados, Botswana, Canada, India, Japan, Morocco, Peru, Poland, Puerto Rico, South Africa, South Korea, Turkey, Uruguay, Virgin Islands (U.S. and British) and Zanzibar.

Season 4 of the Grannies on Safari will release in the summer of 2013 and will feature new travel destinations in China, Croatia, Cuba, Ireland, Israel, Mongolia and Russia.

=== Hosts ===
As world travelers, Fraser and Johnson have visited over 140 countries. They have hosted their own radio shows on BlogTalkRadio to discuss travel tips, shopping and multi-generational travel. They currently blog for the Huffington Post and have contributed articles to AARP.com, Sharecare.com and American Airline's Black Atlas. Their articles include advice on travel destinations from Washington to Mongolia, from Durban to Dubrovnik. They also write about issues they encounter as grandparents, women and breast cancer survivors.

Fraser, born in 1942, is a retired airline promotions executive who developed the Grannies on Safari concept for television in 2005. She is also president of the Grannies on Safari production company, The Art Explorers Inc. Fraser was inspired to travel at an early age because of her father, renown trumpeter Rex Stewart, who toured globally while playing for the Duke Ellington Orchestra.

Fraser serves on the board of the Chicago Jazz Philharmonic. She was part of the Durban Sister Cities Committee that helped Durban, South Africa become a sister city to the City of Chicago in 1997. Her interest in South Africa also spawned other efforts to bring cultural events, like the first Zulu opera, to Chicago.

Johnson, born in 1944, was invited by Fraser to join her in the program development of the Grannies on Safari. Prior to joining the Grannies, Johnson was the first executive director of the Museum of the African Diaspora in San Francisco. She was also the executive director of the Jamaica Center for the Arts and Learning in New York City and founding director of the South Dallas Cultural Center in Texas.

Johnson was an assistant commissioner and director of the Chicago Artists International Program (CAIP), a division of the Chicago Department of Cultural Affairs, from 1983 to 1993. She organized CAIP to support bilateral international cultural exchange between 300 artists and arts administrators from Chicago and 60 countries during a 10-year program supported by the U.S. Department of State, private foundations, and corporations. She also contributed to articles and books written for the program. She has traveled extensively as a cultural specialist and worked as a consultant for many arts and cultural organizations and taught a graduate level course in International Arts Management at Columbia College in Chicago.

Both women are proud grandmothers and have survived breast cancer. In 2012, Granny Regina competed in the 7th annual Dancing with the Chicago Celebrities to help raise money for breast cancer awareness.

=== Speaking ===
When they are not traveling, the Grannies entertain and educate audiences and school children with stories about the places they've been and people they've met. In 2011, the Grannies on Safari were selected as the first celebrity duo to participate in the Flat Stanley educational project. They are recognized as the Flat Grannies on Safari and have appeared in schools in Chicago as well as Ulan Bator, Mongolia to encourage exchange and student communication between the U.S. and schools abroad.

In 2011, the Grannies, with a group of American tourists, arrived in Egypt one day after the beginning of the Arab Spring Revolution. Together, the Grannies experienced this moment in Egyptian history and spoke about it to international audiences. They were eventually evacuated from Luxor, Egypt to Athens, Greece where they were met by the U.S. Ambassador to Greece and his delegation.

The Grannies frequently speak about their show, their travels and life as women and grandmothers at national and international events. They have participated as speakers for AARP's annual "Life@50" in 2011 and 2012, the national Black Women's Expo, Chicago's Lincoln Park Zoo and for many other organizations.

== Media ==
=== DVD ===
Beginning in 2008, the Art Explorers Inc. began releasing seasons of the Grannies on Safari in chronological order. To date, three volumes including 19 episodes have been released. The DVD releases do not have subtitles enabled for the hearing impaired.

In August 2013, the Grannies on Safari will be distributed by Questar Entertainment in a single pack set which includes 19 episodes. Questar will also handle distribution for video on demand for Seasons One, Two and Three of the Grannies on Safari.

=== Books ===
- A Grannies on Safari Book: The Search for Jabulani's Family by Pat Johnson and Regina Fraser, (Art Explorer's Inc., October 2011) ISBN 978-0979204906
- A Grannies on Safari Book: A Travel Journal by Regina Fraser and Pat Johnson, (Art Explorer's Inc., January 2012),
- Grannies to the Rescue: Finding Jabulani's Family, eBOOK by Regina Fraser and Pat Johnson, Art Explorer's Inc. in association with Tiger Stripe Publishing, November 2012, ASIN B00AOUWXRE
- Grannies to the Lookout: Finding the Big Five, eBOOK by Regina Fraser and Pat Johnson, Art Explorer's Inc. in association with Tiger Stripe Publishing, November 2012, ASIN B00AOZMMEI
- Granny Regina's Favorite International Recipes: A Grannies on Safari Cookbook by Regina S. Fraser, (Grannies on Safari, April 2013) ISBN 978-0979204920

== Awards ==
- 2011 Midwest Emmy nomination – Arts/Entertainment Programming
- 2011 Midwest Emmy nomination – Musical Composition/Arrangement
- 2008 Midwest Emmy nomination – Arts/Entertainment Programming
- 2008 Chicago Emmy Award – Musical Composition/Arrangement
- 2008 Chicago Emmy nomination -‐ Arts/Entertainment Programming

== Episodes ==
=== Season 1 ===
Season 1 first aired on American Public Television in May 2006.

1. South Africa: A Country of Cultural Mosaics
2. South Africa: On Safari!
3. Discovering the Wonders of Morocco
4. Istanbul: Ancient Crossroads
5. Japan: The Contemporary and the Ancient
6. South Korea: Off The Beaten Path

=== Season 2 ===
Season 2 first aired on American Public Television in 2008.

1. Ottawa: Canada's Best Kept Secret
2. Poland: Warsaw and Kraków: Sophisticated Sister Cities
3. Cruising the Caribbean: Barbados, Antigua, Saint Lucia
4. Buenos Aires: European Charm with a Latin Beat
5. Montevideo: Uruguay's City of the Drums
6. Toronto: A Cultural and Ethnic Mix
7. San Juan: Bienvenidos, Paradise

=== Season 3 ===
Season 3 first aired on American Public Television in May 2011.

1. India: The Golden Triangle
2. Peru: Its Coastal Cultural Heritage
3. Western Cape, South Africa and Botswana
4. Varanasi: India's Spiritual Capital and Bangalore - A Commercial Star
5. Peru: Cusco & Machu Picchu
6. Tanzania: Exotic Zanzibar

=== Season 4 ===
Season 4 is coming to American Public Television Summer/Fall 2013.

1. Cuba: The Colors of Cuba
2. Croatia: The Inner Splendor
3. Russia: Moscow & the Trans-Siberian Railway
4. Ireland: The Gathering
5. Tel Aviv & Jaffa: Two Vibrant Israeli Neighborhoods
6. The Land of Genghis Khan: Mongolia and China
7. Croatia: The jewels of the Adriatic
8. Israel: A Spiritual Journey
9. Ireland: Belfast and Dublin: Iconic Cities
