= Fattburger =

American jazz group

- Origin: San Diego, California, U.S.
- Genres: Contemporary jazz, jazz fusion, funk, jazz-funk
- Years active: 1986–present
- Labels: Shanachie, Blue Note, Capitol, Intima, Sin-Drome, Golden Boy Jazz
- Members: Kevin Koch; Evan Marks; Mark Hunter; Tommy Aros; Allan Phillips
- Past members: Carl Evans Jr.; Steve Laury; Hollis Gentry
- Website: www.fattburger.com

Fattburger is a jazz group, best categorized in the jazz-funk, contemporary jazz, or jazz fusion subgenres. The band was formed by saxophonist Hollis Gentry, keyboardist Carl Evans Jr., bassist Mark Hunter, drummer Kevin Koch, and guitarist Steve Laury in San Diego during the early 1980s and 2000s. Tommy Aros soon joined as a percussionist.

In 1986, the band was the first major area act to perform at the Adams Avenue Street Festival in Normal Heights, San Diego.

After their first album, Gentry left the band to pursue a solo career but came back as a part-time member in the 1990s. After the release of Come & Get It, Steve Laury left to embark on a solo career. As a result, their next album, On a Roll, was the first recording of Fattburger as a four-piece band, although Kiko Cibrian appeared as a studio guitarist. After their album Work to Do (2004), Hollis Gentry died on September 5, 2006 and Carl Evans Jr. died on April 10, 2008.

Fattburger reunited to play at the Anthology jazz club on June 26, 2009 with Allan Phillips as a new keyboardist.

Fattburger's most commercially successful albums include Sizzlin' and T.G.I.F.attburger!

== Discography ==
=== Albums ===
Title	Year	Label
One of a Kind	1986	Golden Boy Jazz
Good News	1987	Intima
Living in Paradise	1988	Intima
Time Will Tell	1989	Intima
Come & Get It	1990	Capitol
The Best of Fattburger	1992	Blue Note
On a Roll	1993	Sin-Drome
Livin' Large	1995	Shanachie
All Natural Ingredients	1996	Shanachie
Sugar	1998	Shanachie
Fattburger.com	2000	Shanachie
T.G.I.F.attburger!	2001	Shanachie
Sizzlin'	2003	Shanachie
Work to Do!	2004	Shanachie
Greatest Hits	2007	Shanachie

=== Selected singles ===
Title	Release date	Album	Notes
Almost an Angel	1990	Come and Get It	
Anything's Possible	1995	Livin' Large	written by Kevin Koch & Evan Marks
Daydreaming	1988	Living in Paradise	
Eva	1987	Good News	written by Carl S. Evans, Jr.
Good News	1987	Good News	written by Carl S. Evans, Jr. & Ricky Lawson
Imagine That	1988	Living in Paradise	written by Carl S. Evans, Jr.
Imagine This	1993	On a Roll	written by Carl S. Evans, Jr.
In the Street	1993	On a Roll	written by Carl S. Evans, Jr.
Just Got Lucky	1993	On a Roll	written by Mark Shapiro
Monica	1989	Time Will Tell	written by Steve Laury
Night After Night	1990	Come and Get It	
One More Time	1988	Living in Paradise	
Seduction	1993	On a Roll	written by Marcel East & Carl S. Evans, Jr.
Show Me the Honey	1998	Sugar	written by Carl S. Evans, Jr.
Sizzlin'	2003	Sizzlin'	written by Carl S. Evans, Jr.
South Coast Samba	1993	On a Roll	written by Mark Hunter & Mitch Manker
Spice	1998	Sugar	written by Chuck Loeb
The Doctor	1987	Good News	written by Carl S. Evans, Jr.
The Mark of Zorro	1987	Good News	written by Carl S. Evans, Jr.
The Whole Truth	1987	Good News	written by Carl S. Evans, Jr.; Mark Hunter; and Steve Bruce Laury
Tronco's Party Time	1993	On a Roll	written by Kiko Cibrian
Who Put the Meat in My Bed	1989	Time Will Tell	written by Mark Hunter & Steve Laury
You've Got Mail!	2000	Fattburger.com	written by Carl S. Evans, Jr.

== See also ==
- Jazz-funk
- List of smooth jazz performers
- List of funk musicians
- List of jazz fusion artists
