= You Hardly Know Me =

Studio album by Tom Grant
- Released: 1981
- Recorded: 1981
- Genre: Smooth jazz, R&B
- Label: WMOT Records
- Producer: Tom Grant

Tom Grant chronology
Mystified (1976)	You Hardly Know Me (1981)	Tom Grant (1983)

Singles from You Hardly Know Me
- 1. "Heaven Is Waiting" Released: 1981; 2. "You Hardly Know Me" Released: 1981

You Hardly Know Me is the second album by Tom Grant, released in 1981 on WMOT Records.

"Heaven Is Waiting" is Grant's only entry on the Billboard Hot Soul Singles chart, peaking at No. 76.

== Track listing ==
All tracks are written by Tom Grant, except where noted.

Side A
No.	Title	Writer(s)	Length
1.	"The Imposter"		3:54
2.	"Heaven Is Waiting"	Tom Grant, Gregg Tripp	3:56
3.	"Whatever Feels Right"		3:59
4.	"So Free"		3:48
5.	"Workers Of The World"		3:50

Side B
No.	Title	Length
6.	"You Hardly Know Me"	4:04
7.	"High School Fantasies"	4:44
8.	"Big Charlie"	4:37
9.	"Brain Damage"	4:34

== Charts ==
Singles

Year	Single	Chart	Position
1981	"Heaven Is Waiting"	US Billboard Hot Soul Singles	76
