= Hollis Gentry =

American saxophonist (1954–2006)

- Born: Hollis Vernon Gentry III; December 3, 1954; Corpus Christi, Texas, U.S.
- Died: September 5, 2006 (aged 51) San Diego, California, U.S.
- Genre: Jazz
- Occupations: Musician; songwriter; producer
- Instrument: Saxophone

Hollis Vernon Gentry III (December 3, 1954 – September 5, 2006) was an American saxophonist, music producer and composer of smooth jazz and Latin jazz.

Gentry grew up in San Diego and founded the funk band Power at the age of fifteen. Power opened for Cannonball Adderley in 1972 when Gentry was at college. He next played with Bruce Cameron. In 1980 he earned a master's degree in music from the University of California, San Diego. He was known in the mid-1980s in San Diego and southern California as a founding member of the smooth jazz group Fattburger, with whom he recorded several albums. He also worked with Joe Sample, Stanley Clarke, Nathan East, Larry Carlton, Nancy Wilson, Barry White, Freddie Hubbard, Al Jarreau, Thelma Houston, Randy Crawford, Alphonse Mouzon, Gaea Schell, Rob Mullins and David Benoit. Under his own name, he released the albums Hollis Gentry's Neon and For the Record.

He was one of the founders of the music company NETunes, where he was Senior Vice President and A & R for Latin Jazz, World-Beat and Reggae Music.

In September 2004, Gentry was involved in a serious car accident, which cost him the ability to play the saxophone. He died of cancer on September 5, 2006, aged 51.
