= Fer2et 3a Nota =

Fer'et Aa Nota
- Origin: Beirut, Lebanon
- Genres: Fusion
- Years active: 2013–present
- Members: Wajdi Abou Diab (Piano); Zaher Hamadeh (Bass Guitar); Ali Sabbah (Guitars); Raghid Jureidini (Alto Saxophone); Petra Hawi (Vocals); Jihad Zgheib (Drums); Ayman Sleiman (Percussion)
- Past members: April Centrone (Drums)

Fer'et Aa Nota (or Fer2et 3a Nota) (Arabic: فرقت ع نوطة meaning either: "Missed it by a note" or "The note's band") is a Lebanese band that plays fusion between Oriental music, Jazz, Blues and Rock, all rapped up in a genuine Lebanese spirit and lyrics. The band, formed of six members, was founded in 2013 and has one studio album '"حJazz"' (2014).

== Debut album, other projects ==
Fer'et Aa Nota started writing and composing original songs since they were first founded in June 2013. After winning the Audience Prize in a bands competition in Beirut, the band started finalising their original songs, and in April 2014, chose eight original songs, recorded and mixed them at Audio Addicts Studios in Hamra, Beirut. The album was mastered at The Soundmasters in London.
Their debut album was named "حJazz" and contains eight original tracks all written, composed and arranged by the members of the band. Fer'et Aa Nota's first studio album release concert happened at "Al Madina Theater" in Beirut on June 27, in a concert that was both crowd-pleasing and a critical success. The album was released physically at the Lebanese Virgin Megastore and digitally on iTunes, Google Play, AmazonMP3 and others in July 2014.
Ever since, the band has been performing gigs and concert in Beirut and all over Lebanon. The band is also known for re-arranging old classical Arab music, like Muwashshah, and performing new and original versions of them.
In June 2015, in an interview with As-Safir Newspaper, the band announced that a Muwashshah album is in the works, without announcing any release date.
