= Tom Grant (jazz musician) =

American jazz pianist, vocalist (born 1946)

- Born: February 22, 1946 (age 80); Portland, Oregon, U.S.
- Genres: Jazz fusion, smooth jazz
- Occupation: Musician
- Instruments: Piano, vocals
- Years active: 1971–present
- Labels: Chase Music Group, Verve, Shanachie, Windham Hill, Nu-Wrinkle
- Website: www.tomgrant.com

Tom Grant (born February 22, 1946) is an American smooth jazz/jazz fusion pianist and vocalist.

== Biography ==
Tom Grant was born in Portland, Oregon, to a musical family. His father was a tap dancer who owned a record store in Portland, and his brother, Mukunda Goswami, was an avant-garde jazz pianist (as Michael Grant) until becoming a pioneer from the beginning of the Hare Krishna movement.

Grant learned to play piano and drums when he was young. After graduating from the University of Oregon, he traveled to New York City in 1970 with Native American saxophonist Jim Pepper. This led to Grant touring and recording with jazz greats Woody Shaw, Charles Lloyd, and Tony Williams.

Grant cut his first solo record for Timeless in 1976, and in 1979 he formed his own band. Beginning in 1983, Grant started recording a series of jazz-influenced pop albums that have variously been called "New Adult Contemporary", "Quiet Storm", "Contemporary Jazz" and "Smooth Jazz"; each have been best-sellers in the lite jazz market. He has composed music for TV and radio.

Grant has been featured on CNN and was a guest on a March 1993 episode of The Tonight Show with Jay Leno.

== Discography ==
=== Studio albums ===
- Mystified (1976)
- You Hardly Know Me (1981)
- Tom Grant (1983)
- Heart of the City (1984)
- Just The Right Moment (1985)
- Take Me to Your Dream (1986)
- Night Charade (1987)
- Mango Tango (1988)
- Edge of the World (1990)
- In My Wildest Dreams (1992)
- The View From Here (1993)
- Instinct (1995)
- Have Yourself a Merry Little... (1996)
- Lip Service (1997)
- Tune It In (2000)
- Santa Claus Is Going To Town (2001)
- Solo Piano (2003)
- Nice Work If You Can Get It (2004)
- Side By Side (2005)
- Winter Warm (2007)
- Life is Good (2008)
- Delicioso (2009)
- There's a Kitty Under the Christmas Tree (2014)
- The Light Inside My Dream (nu-Wrinkle, 2015)
- Sipping Beauty (nu-Wrinkle, 2017)
- Blue Sapphire with Phil Baker (2019)
- Omniphoria (2026)

=== Compilation albums ===
- Hands: The Tom Grant Collection (1994)
- Reprise (2001)

=== As sideman ===
With Charles Lloyd

- Autumn in New York (Destiny, 1979)

With Tony Williams

- Play or Die (P.S. Productions, 1980)
