= Low Blow (album) =

Studio album by Victor Bailey
- Released: 1999
- Recorded: February–March 1999
- Studios: Carriage House Studios, Stamford, Connecticut
- Genre: Jazz fusion
- Length: 57:24
- Label: ESC Records
- Producer: Victor Bailey

Professional ratings
Review scores
Source	Rating
Allmusic	3/5 stars

Low Blow is an album by Victor Bailey released in 1999. "Graham Cracker" is a tribute to Larry Graham.

== Track listing ==
All tracks composed by Victor Bailey; except where noted.

1. "Low Blow" – 3:11
2. "Sweet Tooth" – 5:58
3. "City Living" – 6:11
4. "Do You Know Who/Continuum" (music: Jaco Pastorius; lyrics: Victor Bailey) – 5:17
5. "Knee-Jerk Reaction" – 7:25
6. "She Left Me" – 5:03
7. "Graham Cracker" – 5:40
8. "Babytalk" – 5:53
9. "Feels Like a Hug" – 5:26
10. "Brain Teaser" – 7:20

== Personnel ==
- Victor Bailey – vocals (1, 4), bass (1, 2, 4–8, 10), Mu-Tron bass (3), keyboards (4, 6, 7), grand piano (7), synth lead (9), synth bass (9), pick bass (9)
- Michael Bearden – grand piano (1, 2, 6), keyboards (1)
- Henry Hey – additional keyboards (1, 6), keyboards (9)
- Jim Beard – keyboards (3, 5), Fender Rhodes (3, 9), Wurlitzer electric piano (5, 8, 10)
- Wayne Krantz – guitars (1–3, 5–7, 9, 10)
- Omar Hakim – drums (1, 2, 4, 6)
- Dennis Chambers – drums (3, 5, 7–10)
- Kenny Garrett – soprano saxophone (2, 7)
- Bill Evans – soprano saxophone (3, 6), saxophone (9)

== Production ==
- Joachim Becker – executive album producer
- Ricky Schultz – executive producer
- Victor Bailey – producer, arrangements
- Andy Katz – recording
- Arty Skye – mixing
- Tom Filligamo – assistant engineer
- John Montagnese – assistant engineer
- Joe Peccerillo – assistant engineer
- Ted Jensen – mastering at Sterling Sound (New York City, New York)
- Bob Trier – design, cover design
- Eddie "Samba Agau" Francois – photography
