= Dogatana =

Studio album by Kazumi Watanabe
- Released: 1981
- Recorded: Spring–fall 1981
- Studio: Power Station, New York City; Nippon Columbia, Tokyo
- Genre: Fusion, acoustic
- Label: Denon (Nippon Columbia)
- Producer: Kazumi Watanabe, Mike Mainieri (co-producer)

Dogatana is a 1981 album by Japanese jazz guitarist Kazumi Watanabe. As usual for Watanabe, it features many acclaimed musicians. The album, compared to other Watanabe works, makes prominent use of acoustic guitars and is characterized by guitar "duets" between guitar tracks.

It was released on Columbia Records, then re-released many times. The sleeve reads: "This album is dedicated to the memories of Akira Aimi".

== Track listing ==
1. "Nuevo Espresso"
2. "Loosey Goosey"
3. "Ti-Fa-Let"
4. "Island"
5. "Diana"
6. "Waterfall Autumn"
7. "Please Don't Bundle Me"
8. "Haru No Tsurara"

== Personnel ==
- Kazumi Watanabe - Ovation Adamas guitar (1, 2, 4, 5, 6, 7), Roland MC-4 (3, 8), Arp odyssey (3, 8), prophet 5 (3, 8), prophet 1 (8), Aria double neck (3, 8)
- Mike Mainieri - vibraphone (1)
- Osamu Ishida - Ovation Adamas (2)
- June Yamagishi - Ovation Adamas (2)
- Larry Coryell - Ovation Adamas (7)
- Dave Liebman - alto flute (4)
- Warren Berhardt - piano (6)
- Nobuyoshi Ino - bass (8)
- Hideo Yamaki - drums (8)

== Additional personnel ==
- Scott Litt, James Farber - recording, mixing
- Aki Ikuta - art direction
- Kenji Sugiyama - design
- Nobuyuki Kuwabara - illustrations
