= Himiko Kikuchi =

Japanese jazz pianist and composer

- Born: Himiko Kikuchi (菊池 ひみこ); March 2, 1953 (age 73); Sendai, Miyagi Prefecture, Japan
- Genres: Jazz; jazz fusion
- Occupations: Musician; composer; arranger
- Instruments: Piano; keyboards
- Years active: 1965–present

Himiko Kikuchi (菊池 ひみこ, Kikuchi Himiko; born March 2, 1953) is a Japanese jazz pianist, keyboardist, composer and arranger.

== Early life ==
Kikuchi was born in Sendai, Miyagi Prefecture, on March 2, 1953. Raised in Shiogama, she began studying classical piano at the age of 7, under the tutelage of Ruiko Koga of Miyagi Gakuin Women's University's Music Department, and Tokyo University of the Arts Professor Takako Horie. When she was 12 years old, she won second prize at the Yamaha Electone Competition for her performance of Johann Sebastian Bach's Toccata and Fugue in D minor.

== Music career ==
After performing with vocalists and musicians such as Takuro Yoshida, Tsunehiko Kamijō, and Mayumi Itsuwa, Kikuchi began studying under jazz pianist Sadayasu Fujii around 1975. On July 11, 1979, Kikuchi was the keyboardist for Bingo Miki & the Inner Galaxy Orchestra during their set at Montreux Jazz Festival in Switzerland.

In 1980, Kikuchi released her debut studio album, Don't Be Stupid, through the Teichiku Records sublabel Continental. The following year, she arranged the tracks for the 1981 album Cool "C" by American musician Richie Cole. Her next albums, Flashing (1981), All Right (1982), Woman (1983), and Reverse It (1984), were all issued by Continental.

The 1987 album Flying Beagle and 1988 album Sevilla Breeze were released by CBS/Sony Records.

Kikuchi composed the music for the 1993 film Yakuza Ladies Revisited 2; her album Beam, released through RCA Records, serves as the film's soundtrack.

In 2002, Kikuchi served as music director and led an orchestra at the 17th National Cultural Festival, held in Tottori Prefecture, performing the song "Furusato - Home in My Soul". In 2005, she performed the song once more at the opening ceremony of the 17th National Lifelong Learning Festival, held in the same prefecture. The same year, she received the 30th Tottori City Cultural Award.

Flashing (1981), Kikuchi's second album was reprinted as a Tower Records exclusive in 2014.

In 2021, Kikuchi and her husband Masatsugu Matsumoto held the "Himiko Kikuchi and Masashi Matsumoto 50th Anniversary Concert in Music" to commemorate the 50th anniversary of both of their musical careers.

In 2024, Flying Beagle and Sevilla Breeze, both albums from the CBS/SONY period were reissued as a Tower Records exclusive in a 2023 remaster.

== Personal life ==
Kikuchi is married to guitarist Masatsugu Matsumoto. She moved to Tottori with him in 1999.

== Discography ==
All albums released under the Continental label were released to streaming services including Spotify and YouTube Music on May 28, 2024, with the albums released under the CBS/Sony Records label following on October 8, 2024.

=== Studio albums ===
==== As leader ====
- Don't Be Stupid (Continental, 1980)
- Flashing (Continental, 1981)
- All Right (Continental, 1982)
- Woman (Continental, 1983)
- Reverse It (Continental, 1984)
- Shinra Banshou (森羅万象) (Continental, 1985)
- Flying Beagle (CBS/Sony, 1987)
- Sevilla Breeze (CBS/Sony, 1988)
- Beam (RCA, 1993)

As leader, released under different name

- Himiko Kikuchi Big Band - Himiko Kikuchi Big Band Live (Flying Beagle Corporation, 2000)
- Himiko Kikuchi & Yume Festa Gasshoudan - Furusato～Home In My Soul (ふるさと～Home In My Soul) (Flying Beagle Corporation, 2005)
- Himiko Kikuchi Double Quartet - DQ * The Live! (Toei Music Publishing and Flying Beagle Corporation, 2007)
