= To Chi Ka =

Studio album by Kazumi Watanabe
- Released: May 25, 1980
- Recorded: March 4–26, 1980
- Genre: Fusion
- Label: Columbia

To Chi Ka is a fusion album by Kazumi Watanabe. It was recorded and mixed in March 1980 during a prolific period for Watanabe and then released in May 1980. Several jazz and rock musicians play on the album, some of whom would collaborate with Watanabe on other projects. The album contains many improvisational tracks.

== Track listing ==
1. "Liquid Fingers" 4:57
2. "Black Canal" 6:46
3. "To Chi Ka" 3:35
4. "Cokumo Island" 8:52
5. "Unicorn" 4:45
6. "Don't Be Silly" 5:42
7. "Sayonara" 5:29
8. "Manhattan Flu Dance" 6:03

== Personnel ==
- Kazumi Watanabe – guitars
- Mike Mainieri – vibraphone
- Kenny Kirkland – piano
- Marcus Miller – bass
- Tony Levin – fretless bass
- Peter Erskine – drums
- Steve Jordan – percussion
- Sammy Figueroa – percussion
- Warren Bernhardt – keyboards
- Michael Brecker – tenor saxophone on #4
