= This Is This! =

Studio album by Weather Report
- Released: August 26, 1986
- Recorded: December 1985
- Genre: Jazz fusion
- Length: 45:41
- Label: Columbia
- Producer: Joe Zawinul, Wayne Shorter

Weather Report chronology
Sportin' Life (1985)	This Is This! (1986)	Live and Unreleased (2002)

Joe Zawinul chronology
Sportin' Life (1985)	This Is This! (1986)	Di•a•lects (1986)

Professional ratings
Review scores
Source	Rating
AllMusic	3/5 stars
The Penguin Guide to Jazz Recordings	3/4 stars

This Is This! is the fourteenth and final studio album by Weather Report, released in August 1986. The band thought that it had fulfilled its contract with Columbia Records through the release of the previous album, Sportin' Life. This, however, was not the case, and the band had to release one more record. It was their only album to feature no compositions by saxophonist Wayne Shorter.

== Track listing ==
All tracks are written by Joe Zawinul, except where noted.

Side one

1. "This Is This" – 7:06
2. "Face the Fire" – 2:34
3. "I'll Never Forget You" – 7:51
4. "Jungle Stuff, Part I" (Mino Cinélu) – 4:43

Side two

1. "Man with the Copper Fingers" – 6:12
2. "Consequently" (Victor Bailey) – 4:56
3. "Update" – 6:08
4. "China Blues" – 6:11

== Personnel ==
Weather Report

- Joe Zawinul – keyboards, cover concept
- Wayne Shorter – saxophones
- Victor Bailey – bass
- Mino Cinélu – percussion, vocals
- Peter Erskine – drums
- Omar Hakim – drums (track 6)

Additional musicians

- Carlos Santana – guitar (tracks 1 & 5)
- Marva Barnes – vocals
- Colleen Coil – vocals
- Siedah Garrett – vocals
- Darryl Phinnessee – vocals

Production

- Howard Siegel – engineer
- Paul Ericksen – engineer
- Tony Lane – cover artwork
- Nancy Donald – cover artwork
- Lou Beach – cover illustration
