= Domino Theory (album) =

1984 studio/live album by Weather Report

Studio album with live recordings by Weather Report
- Released: April 1984
- Recorded: 1983
- Venue: Koseinenkin Hall (Osaka, Japan)
- Studio: The Music Room (Pasadena, California); Sound Castle and Lion Share Recording Studios (Los Angeles, California)
- Genre: Jazz fusion
- Length: 47:28
- Label: Columbia
- Producer: Joe Zawinul, Wayne Shorter, Omar Hakim

Weather Report chronology
Procession (1983)	Domino Theory (1984)	Sportin' Life (1985)

Professional ratings
Review scores
Source	Rating
Allmusic	2.5/5 stars
The Rolling Stone Jazz Record Guide	3/5 stars

Domino Theory is the twelfth studio album by jazz fusion band Weather Report, released in April 1984. It is the second studio album to feature the Hakim-Bailey-Rossy rhythm section. The album contains seven tracks, three of which were recorded live.

The title of the album is a reference towards the American geopolitical theory of the same name which gained popularity between the 1950s and 1980s.

== Track listing ==
All tracks composed by Joe Zawinul, except where noted.

Side one

1. "Can It Be Done" (Wilson Tee) – 4:02
2. "D♭ Waltz" – 11:10
3. "The Peasant" – 8:16

Side two

1. "Predator" (Wayne Shorter) – 5:21
2. "Blue Sound - Note 3" – 6:52
3. "Swamp Cabbage" (Shorter) – 5:22
4. "Domino Theory" – 6:09

== Personnel ==
Weather Report

- Joe Zawinul – keyboards, synthesizers
- Wayne Shorter – saxophones
- Victor Bailey – bass
- Omar Hakim – drums
- José Rossy – percussion
- Carl Anderson – vocals (1)

Production

- Joe Zawinul – producer
- Omar Hakim – co-producer
- Wayne Shorter – co-producer
- Bernie Fromm – engineer
- Mitch Gibson – engineer
- Tom Suzuki – engineer
- Larry Ferguson – assistant engineer
- Bernie Grundman – mastering at A&M Studios (Hollywood, California)
- Tony Lane – cover design
- Nancy Donald – cover design
