= Dialects (album) =

Studio album by Joe Zawinul
- Released: June 1986
- Recorded: 1985
- Studio: The Music Room, Pasadena, California
- Genre: Jazz fusion, soul jazz, world fusion
- Length: 42:21
- Label: Columbia
- Producer: Joe Zawinul

Joe Zawinul chronology
This Is This! (1986)	Dialects (1986)	The Immigrants (1988)

Professional ratings
Review scores
Source	Rating
AllMusic	5/5 stars

Dialects, stylized as Di•a•lects and alternatively known as Di•a•lects, Music for solo synthesizers and voices, is the fourth studio album by Joe Zawinul which was released in 1986. It was created by Zawinul alone with his programmed synths and rhythm machines, using vocoders on his own vox and importing Bobby McFerrin's improvised onomatopoeics and a vocal trio singing in a Zawinul-created language on other tracks."

== Reception ==
Pablo Guzmán at Spin said, "Zawinul prefers an old-fashioned full-frontal attack, synthesizers sounding clarion calls of change. His album is basically synths and voices . Zawinul's rhythmic and harmonic riffs, plus his bop/funk arrangements, all add up to this LP sounding like Prince and his keyboards slipped thru a time warp darkly and hooked up with young Miles and Diz."

The AllMusic reviewer concluded, "This is an important, overlooked album because it proves that electronic instruments can reach your emotions and shake your body when played by someone who has bothered to learn how to master them."

== Track listing ==
All tracks composed by Joe Zawinul

1. "The Harvest" – 6:04
2. "Waiting for the Rain" – 7:38
3. "Zeebop" – 4:50
4. "The Great Empire" – 3:57
5. "Carnavalito" – 6:18
6. "6 A.M./Walking on the Nile" – 7:06
7. "Peace" – 6:49

== Personnel ==
Musicians

- Joe Zawinul – synthesizers, vocals
- Bobby McFerrin – vocals
- Carl Anderson – vocals
- Dee Dee Bellson – vocals
- Alfie Silas – vocals

Production

- Joe Zawinul – producer, design
- George Butler – executive producer
- Peter Kelsey – engineer
- Paul Ericksen – second engineer
- Bernie Grundman – mastering
- Corvalan-Condliffe Management – management
- Joseph Futterer – art direction
- Richie Powell – art direction
- Vivian Bremner – illustration

== See also ==
- Weather Report, Sportin' Life (1985)
