= Zawinul (album) =

Studio album by Joe Zawinul
- Released: May 1971
- Recorded: August 6 – October 28, 1970
- Studio: Atlantic Studios, New York City
- Genre: Jazz fusion, hard bop, soul jazz
- Length: 35:45
- Label: Atlantic
- Producer: Joel Dorn

Joe Zawinul chronology
The Rise and Fall of the Third Stream (1968)	Zawinul (1971)	Weather Report (1971)

Zawinul is the third studio album by jazz composer and pianist Joe Zawinul recorded in 1970 by Zawinul performing music arranged for two electric pianos, flute, trumpet, soprano saxophone, two contrabasses, and percussion. The album reached number 17 in the Billboard Jazz album charts.

== Reception ==
The Allmusic review by Richard S. Ginell awarded the album 4 stars, stating, "Conceptually, sonically, this is really the first Weather Report album in all but name, confirming that Joe Zawinul was the primary creative engine behind the group from the beginning".

Professional ratings
Review scores
Source	Rating
Allmusic	4/5 stars
Rolling Stone	(not rated)
The Rolling Stone Jazz Record Guide	4/5 stars
The Penguin Guide to Jazz Recordings	4/4 stars

== Track listing ==
All compositions by Joe Zawinul

1. "Doctor Honoris Causa" – 13:48
2. "In a Silent Way" – 4:51
3. "His Last Journey" – 4:36
4. "Double Image" – 10:32
5. "Arrival in New York" – 2:01
- Recorded at Atlantic Recording Studios, New York, N.Y

== Personnel ==
Musicians

- Joe Zawinul – acoustic and electric piano
- Herbie Hancock – electric piano
- George Davis – flute (tracks 1–3 & 5)
- Hubert Laws – flute (track 4)
- Woody Shaw – trumpet (tracks 1–2, 4–5)
- Jimmy Owens – trumpet (track 3)
- Earl Turbinton – soprano saxophone (tracks 1–3 & 5)
- Wayne Shorter – soprano saxophone (track 4)
- Miroslav Vitouš – bass
- Walter Booker – bass
- Billy Hart – percussion
- David Lee – percussion
- Joe Chambers – percussion
- Jack DeJohnette – melodica (track 3), percussion (track 4)

Production

- Gene Paul – recording engineer
- Lew Hahn – recording and remixing engineer
- Ed Freeman – cover design and photography

== Chart performance ==
Year	Chart	Position
1971	Billboard Jazz Albums	17

== See also ==
- In a Silent Way (1969) – "In a Silent Way"
- The Complete Bitches Brew Sessions (1998) – "Double Image"
