= Allan Phillips =

- Origin: Maracaibo, Venezuela
- Genres: Jazz, pop, rock, reggae, Latín, film score, funk, Brazilian, classical
- Occupations: Music producer, composer, arranger, and musician
- Instruments: Percussion, keyboard, strings, and winds
- Years active: 1976–present
- Website: AllanPhillips.com

Allan Phillips is a music producer, composer, arranger, and musician. His musical style is a blend of contemporary music with ethnic elements from around the world. In 2011, his composition Moon/Luna Llena was chosen as a wake up call song for the astronauts aboard the Space Shuttle Endeavour’s STS-134 mission commanded by Capt. Mark Kelly. Also in 2011, music he composed and produced for Clark Marketing Solutions earned three Awards of Distinction from the 2011 Communicator Awards in the categories of audio production, jingle production and video production/use of graphics for work created for automotive client Diamond Valley Honda.

== Biography ==
Born in Maracaibo, Venezuela. Allan Phillips' early musical roots are in Afro-indigenous street music, and over the years he has expanded his craft into a blend of Latin, pop, funk, jazz, African, hip hop, dance, Caribbean/reggae, rock, soul/R&B, Brazilian, Mediterranean, Asian, European, country, ambient/new age, and classical.

Currently Performs with:

- The Soul Collective
- Gene Perry
- Sol e Mar
- Peter Pupping

== Compositions/arrangements and orchestrations ==
- Composed and produced the music score for season 1 and 2 of the PBS series Grannies on Safari.
- Arranged and produced the music for the Macy's Thanksgiving Day Parade in New York and The Rose Parade in Pasadena, CA., 2008
- Film:
  - World Dance Workout (DVD), 2006
  - Tijuana Jews (feature), 2005
  - Family Values in the Goddess Years, 1999
  - Love Always (feature), 1996
  - Break of Dawn (feature), 1988
- Theatre:
  - Rule My World (Urban Opera), 2009
  - The New Mambo Kings (Musical), 2009
  - Latin Gems (Musical), 2004
  - Latin Twist (Musical), 2000
  - Blood Wedding (Play), 1983

== Discography and Production ==
Year	Artist	Album name	Genre	Label
2016	Debora Galán	All About Love	Smooth Latin Jazz	Unsigned (Debora Galan Publishing)
2015	Nirvana Singh	Sounds of Nirvana	World Music	Momenta Records
2015	LBJ	“U” (single)	Jazz	LBJ Records
2015	Mariea Antoinette	Straight From tde Harp (Special Edition)	Jazz	Maasai/Infinity
2015	Sandra Sandia	¡Alegria!	Latin	DeFontaines Records
2015	LBJ	tde Music & tde Moment!	Jazz	LBJ Records
2015	Bartd Beasley	Run On to Detroit (single)	Pop	BBR
2015	Gila Cadry	DNA Enchantment	New Age	Independent
2015	Mair Ratdburn	Nada Te Turbe (single)	Religious	MRM
2015	Mariea Antoinette	Angels (single)	Holiday	Piwai
2015	Piwai	African Turquoise (Vol. I)	World	Piwai Music
2015	Andre Stevens-Thomas	Me & My Band (single)	AC	Independent
2014	Mariea Antoinette	Straight From The Harp	Jazz	Maasai/Infinity
2014	Tom Barabas	Encore!	Jazz	TBA
2013	Mair Rathburn	Lo, How a Rose	Holiday	MRM
2013	Ruby Blue	Revealed	Jazz	Ruby Records
2013	Lee Hartley	Whole Lotta Somethin'	Jazz	LHR
2013	Native Vibe	In The Land of Muses	Jazz	Third Beat Records
2012	Ted Herman Orchestra/Featuring Lee Hartley & Larry Capeloto	Swinging Big!	Big Band	TH
2012	Nirvana Singh	Sounds of Nirvana	World Music	Momenta Records
2011	Robert Incelli	Asi Se Goza!	Latin Jazz	RIC Records
2011	Katia Riquelme	Living in a Car	Rock	Petalo Blue, L.L.C.
2011	Natalya Phillips	Whisper	Singer/songwriter	TOL
2011	Peter Pupping Band	Cafe Pacifico	Latin	
2011	Jose Molina Serrano	Moon/Luna Llena (single)	Adult Contemporary	
2010	Natalya Phillips	You Remind Me of Christmas (single)	Holiday	TOL
2010	Ross Carlson	If She Asks	Instrumental	RCE
2010	Bradley Leighton	Holiday of Lights	Holiday	Pacific Coast Jazz
2010	Rob Mehl	Neat, With A Twist	Tropical rock	Seaside
2010	Paula Prophet	From Me To You	Jazz	PCJ
2010	Monette Marino Keita	Coup d'Eclat	World Music	Djembefola Productions
2009	Allan Phillips	Ethnic Alchemy 2	World-Electronic	APM
2009	Rob Mehl	Out of the Blue	TropRock	Seaside
2009	Pat Murphy	The PH Project	Pop	PMP
2009	Eva Ayllón	Kimba Fá	World Music	Times Square records
2008	Danny Green	With You In Mind	Jazz	Alante Rec.
2008	Sandra Sandia	Sandra Sandia	Children's Music	DF Music
2008	Bradley Leighton	Soul Collective	Jazz/Funk	Pacific Coast Jazz
2008	Peter Pupping	Sea Journey	Instrumental	Guitar Sounds
2008	Native Vibe	Across The Globe	World Music	TBR
2007	Gene Perry	Mi Tambor	Salsa/Latin Jazz	Masakote
2007	Robert Incelli	Baila Conmigo	Salsa	Rcacharra
2007	Ajna	Dance With The Universe	World Music	Ajna
2007	Zosia	Zosia	Pop/Folk	Boczanowski
2006	Khausak	Romance	Andean	Khausak
2006	Allan Phillips	Ethnic Alchemy 1	World-Electronic	APM
2006	Israel Maldonado	Grateful	Reggae/Pop	IMM
2006	Leonard Tucker	This Christmas	Christmas	LeonardTucker.com
2006	Bradley Leighton	Back To The Funk	Jazz	Pacific Coast Jazz
2006	Pablo Mendez	Latin Soul	Latin/Instrumental	Pablo Mendez
2006	Bob Boss	3 Trios +	Jazz	Samizdat
2005	Various Artists	Cool Summer Vol.4	Jazz	Jazziz
2005	Sharon Ory	Spirit Presence	Meditation	Guided Meditation
2005	DANNY	A New Orleans Musical	Musical	Foxworthy
2005	Peter Pupping	Where It Started	Contemporary Jazz	Guitar Sounds TM
2005	Ahoté	Turning Point	New-age/folklore	Northwind Prod.
2005	Delmundo	At The Edge Of The World	Flamenco	Delmundo Music
2005	Burt Brion	Say The Word	Jazz/Pop	Mister B
2005	Malamaña	Malamaña	Flamenco	Kunze&Tidwell
2005	Bradley Leighton	Just Doin' Our Thang	Jazz	Pacific Coast Jazz
2005	Javid	Silk Road	New Flamenco	Javid
2005	Robert Incelli	Master Jam	Latin Jazz	Valentino Prod.
2005	Native Vibe	Luna De Nosara	Latin/Jazz/Rock	Third Beat Records
2005	Mair Rathburn	How Can I Keep...	Classical Harp	THR Music
2005	Marquinho	Marq. Misterio	Brazilian	Aguerre
2005	Jazziz	Cool Summer vol.4	Jazz	Jazziz
2004	Mike Stauffer	Layover In London	Indie Rock	SDIR
2004	Joselo	Christmas Album	Andean/Christmas	Inka
2004	Fire Prince	Blessing In Disguise	Rock	Swigart
2004	Primo	Para Ti, Primo	Salsa	Primomuzik
2004	Jaime Valle	Vital Signs	Latin Jazz	Blueport Jazz
2004	Iza	Carry My Love	Adult Contemporary	Northwind Prod.
2003	Glenn Carson	Timeless	Pop-Soul	Upclose
2003	Ruby Blue	Skin	Jazz	Etoile Prod.
2003	Khausak	Love Songs	Andean/Instrumental	Khausak
2003	Rob Mehl	Just Give Me The Keys	Folk/Rock/Caribbean	RM
2003	Joselo	For Ever In My Heart	Andean	Inka
2003	Ben Eager	Resolution	Jazz	Biffco
2002	SD All Stars	My Port Of Call	Jazz/Big Band	IVRYS
2002	Solemar	Percussion Avalanche	Brazilian/Cuban	Solemar group
2002	Illari	Aquamarine	Andean/new-age	Chronos
2002	Allen Singer	In Tradition	Folk	Allen Singer
2002	Kai	Heroes, Saints & Angels	Rock	Swigart
2001	Michel Blood	It's Your Turn Tonight	Pop	Musivation
2001	Maria Yracébúrú	A Story Of Prophecy Fulfilling	World Music	Apache Rhythms
2001	Joselo	Inka Show	Andean	Inka
2000	Robert Incelli	From Bolivar To L.A.	Latin Jazz	Tonga
2000	Up With People	A Common Beat	Pop	UWP
2000	Jose Ivan Quiceno	Por El Camino	Latin	QC
2000	Carlos Olmeda	Spanish 101 For Lovers	Latin/Folk	BellaNova
1999	Jose Serrano	Only By Grace	Latin Fusion	JavazzMano
1999	Big Mountain	Things To Come	Reggae/Pop	Rebel Ink
1999	Orchestral	90's Love Songs	Instrumental	NMG
1999	Big Mountain	Rainbow Drive	Reggae/Pop	PONY C. (Japan)
1998	Native Vibe	Spirits	Afro Jazz	Domo
1998	Illari	Blue Symphony	Andean/new-age	Chronos
1999	Carlos Rivas	No Fue En Vano	Salsa	MEXSAL
1998	Del Mundo	Out Of This World	Flamenco	Delmundo
1998	Roberto Valdez	Gypsy Heart	Gypsy/Classical	EGRC
1998	La Conciencia	Solo Un Juego	Salsa	HRM
1998	Allan Phillips	Caribbean Mood	Caribbean	World Disc
1997	Copal	Despues Del Silencio	Andean	Copal Records
1997	African Dawn	Voices	African	World Disc
1997	Up With People	Roads	Pop	UWP
1996	Allan Phillips	Voices Of Change	African	World Disc
1996	Jaime Valle	Third Voyage	Latin Jazz	World Jazz
1996	Roberto Valdez	Gypsy's Cocktail	Gypsy/Classical	EGRC
1995	Voices	I'll Be Home For Christmas	Christmas	MCA
1995	Tyro Styles	Serious Lover	Reggae	ReggaeWize
1995	Joseph Advento	All Of My Life	Pop	JOA
1995	Papa	The Steel Drum	Caribbean	Quanah
1994	Jaime Valle	Different World	Latin Jazz	World Jazz
1994	Marilee Hall	Come Touch Me	Pop	MHP
1994	Nee	My Father's Son	Afro Jazz	Palmusic
1994	Carlos Murillas	Romantic Harp II	Instrumental	MHM
1994	Fried Bananas	Fried Bananas	Rock/Reggae	FBM
1993	Acoustic Variations	A.V.	Mixed	Orphan
1993	ELE	Sigueme	Pop	Palmusic
1993	Under The Lake	Dive In	Fusion Jazz	Palmusic
1993	Dr. Chico	The Art Of Hip Hop	Caribbean	Palmusic
1992	Jose Ivan Quiceno	A World Of Music	Latin Folk	QC
1992	Luder Palacios	Feelings On Piano	Instrumental	Palmusic
1992	Jaime Valle	Round Midnight	Latin Jazz	Palmusic
1992	Carlos Guedes	Toda America	Latin Jazz	Heads Up
1992	Kumara	Al Sonar	Andean/Pop	Palmusic
1992	Alma Del Sur	Alma Del Sur	South American	Narada
1991	Carlos Murillas	Romantic Harp I	Instrumental	MHM
1991	Bill Macpherson	Jungle Party	Afro Jazz	Palmusic
1990	Agape	Spanglische	Latin Jazz	L & P
1989	Artefacto	Synthesis	Techno	Quartz Intl.
1989	Lédé	A Mother's Love	Pop/R&B	E3 Company
1989	Gloria España	Ojos Verdes	Pop	E3 Company
1989	Gail Mc Neil	You'll Do Fine	R&B	E3 Company
1989	Raxx	Tejiendo Banderas	Rock	Quartz Intl.
1988	Toda Via	Cielo Azul	Rock-Pop	Quartz Intl.
1985	Jose Herrera	Gente De Hoy	Pop	Quartz Intl.
1981	Nuevo Son	A Mover La Gente	Salsa	
1981	Los Fulleros	Los Fulleros III	Gaita	L'Scala
1982	Leida Torrealba	Vitanse	Christmas	L'Scala
1981	Rullio	Chistes	Christmas	L'Scala
1980	Los Fulleros	Los Fulleros II	Gaita	Suramericana
1979	Los Favos	La Contradanza	Gaita	Favorito

== Awards and nominations ==
- Produced Eva Ayllon album Kimba Fa, which was nominated for a 2009 Latin Grammy nomination in the Best Folk Album category
- 2008 Emmy for the musical score of Grannies on Safari
- Allan Phillips was part of Alex Acuña's team in his Grammy nominated album Acuarela de Tambores
- Produced albums winners of 14 San Diego Music Awards
- Winner of 5 U.C.S.D outstanding artist awards
