= Orhan Demir =

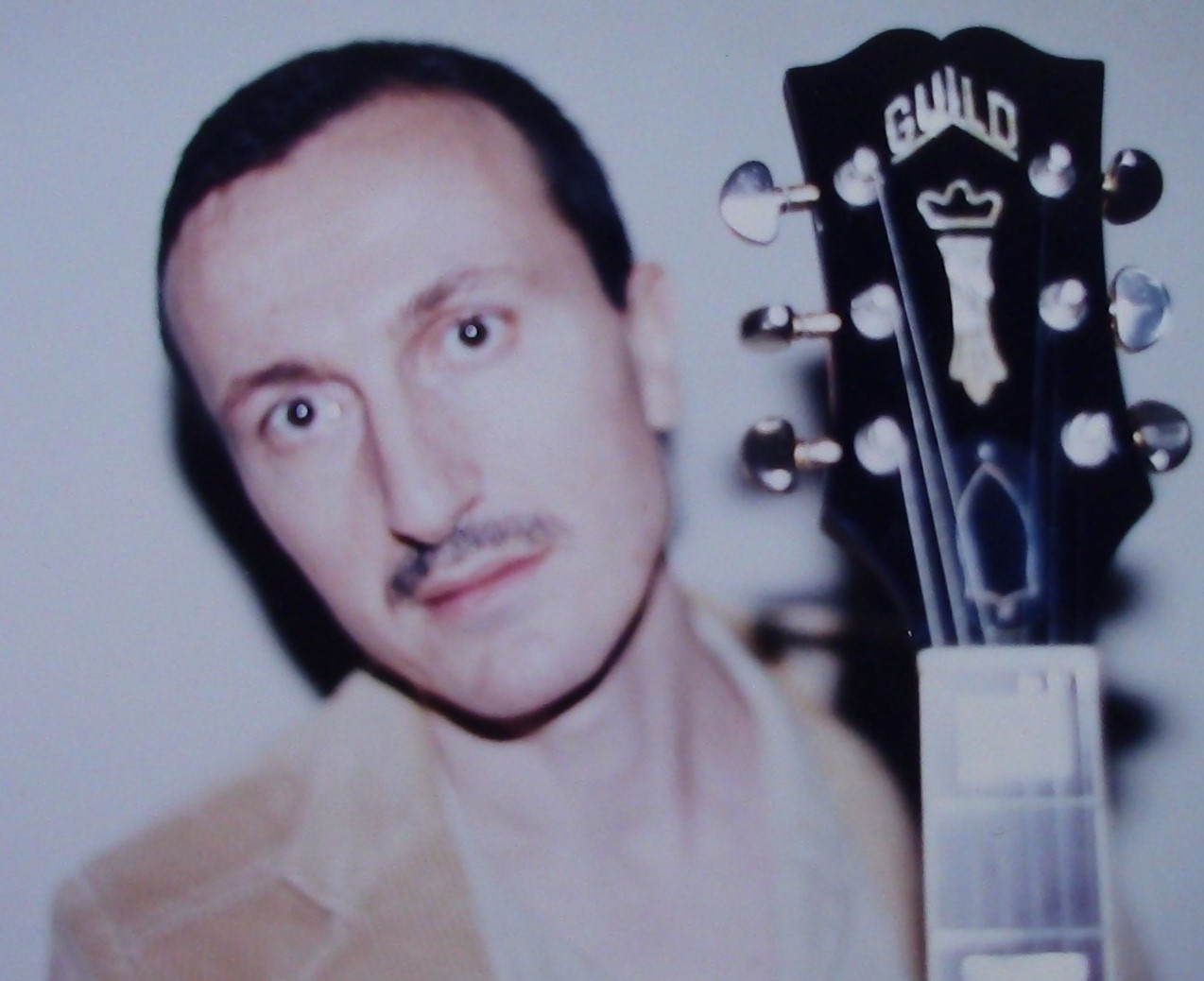
- Demir in the early 2000s

Background information
- Genre: Jazz
- Label: Hittite Records

Orhan Demir (Turkish: [oɾˈhan ˈdemiɾ]; born 1954 in Istanbul, Turkey) is a Canadian jazz guitarist. His first release, in 1986, was The Way I See You; his second release, in 1987, was North West; the third album was 1989's Windmill; in 1990 he released the solo acoustic album Sultan of Strings, followed by Hot Cargo (1993), Originals (1997), Guitar Plus (1998), Originals Vol. 2 (2018), Freedom in Jazz (2019), Freedom in Jazz Vol. 2 (2020), and the Ziggurat DVD (2021). Orhan Demir recordings received great reviews from Jazz Times, Down Beat, Guitar World, Cadence, Options, Coda, Jazz Journal and others.

== Brief Biography ==
Demir, born September 29, 1954, in Istanbul, immigrated to Canada in 1977. His albums were cited by respected magazines such as DownBeat.

Orhan Demir's style is an interesting blend of Be-Bop rhythms set against a middle-eastern scale played with a fast picking technique. He has been compared to Django Reinhardt.

== Musicians ==
- Orhan Demir - guitar
- Neil Swainson - acoustic bass
- Barry Elmes - drums
- Rick Lazaroff - electric bass
- Jack Vorvis - drums
- Thomas Oreynicki - bass
- Francois Briere - t. saxophone
- Perry Pansieri - drums

== Selected discography ==
- The Way I See You (1986)
- Northwest (1988)
- Windmill (1989)
- Sultan Of Strings (1990)
- Hot Cargo (1993)
- Guitar Plus (1998)
- Originals (1997)
- Originals Vol.2, (2018)
- Freedom in Jazz, (2019)
- Freedom in Jazz, Vol.2 (2020)
- Ziggurat in 2021.
- Freedom in Jazz, Vol. 3 (2023).
- Wicked Demon (2025)
