= Sportin' Life (Weather Report album) =

Studio album by Weather Report
- Released: June 25, 1985
- Recorded: August – September 1984
- Genre: Jazz fusion
- Length: 39:09
- Label: Columbia
- Producers: Joe Zawinul, Wayne Shorter

Weather Report chronology
Domino Theory (1984)	Sportin' Life (1985)	This Is This! (1986)

Professional ratings
Review scores
Source	Rating
Allmusic	3.5/5 stars
The Penguin Guide to Jazz Recordings	3/4 stars

Sportin' Life is the thirteenth studio album by American jazz fusion band Weather Report which was released in June 1985 through Columbia Records. Although featuring many more vocal performances than any of their previous studio albums, words are rare and most vocals are chants from guest musicians such as Bobby McFerrin or Carl Anderson. The album is named after a character from Porgy and Bess. Sportin' Life was to have been the last Weather Report studio album, but due to contractual obligations with Columbia the band had to release a follow-up, This Is This!, in 1986.

== Track listing ==
All tracks composed by Joe Zawinul, except where indicated.

Side one

1. "Corner Pocket" – 5:46
2. "Indiscretions" – 4:05
3. "Hot Cargo" – 4:41
4. "Confians" (Mino Cinélu) – 5:07

Side two

1. "Pearl On the Half Shell" (Wayne Shorter) – 4:06
2. "What's Going On" (Renaldo Benson, Alfred Cleveland, Marvin Gaye) – 6:29
3. "Face on the Barroom Floor" (Shorter) – 3:59
4. "Ice-Pick Willy" – 5:00

== Personnel ==
Weather Report

- Joe Zawinul – keyboards
- Wayne Shorter – saxophones
- Omar Hakim – drums, background vocals (track 4)
- Victor Bailey – bass, background vocals (track 4)
- Mino Cinélu – percussion, lead vocals and acoustic guitar on (track 4)

Additional musicians

- Bobby McFerrin – vocalist (tracks 1, 3, 5, 8)
- Carl Anderson – vocalist (tracks 1, 3, 8)
- Dee Dee Bellson – vocalist (tracks 1, 3, 8)
- Alfie Silas – voice (tracks 1, 3, 8)

Production

- Howard Siegel – engineer
- Tony Lane, Nancy Donald – art direction
- Jerry McDonald – album artwork
