= Victor Bailey (musician) =

American bassist (1960–2016)

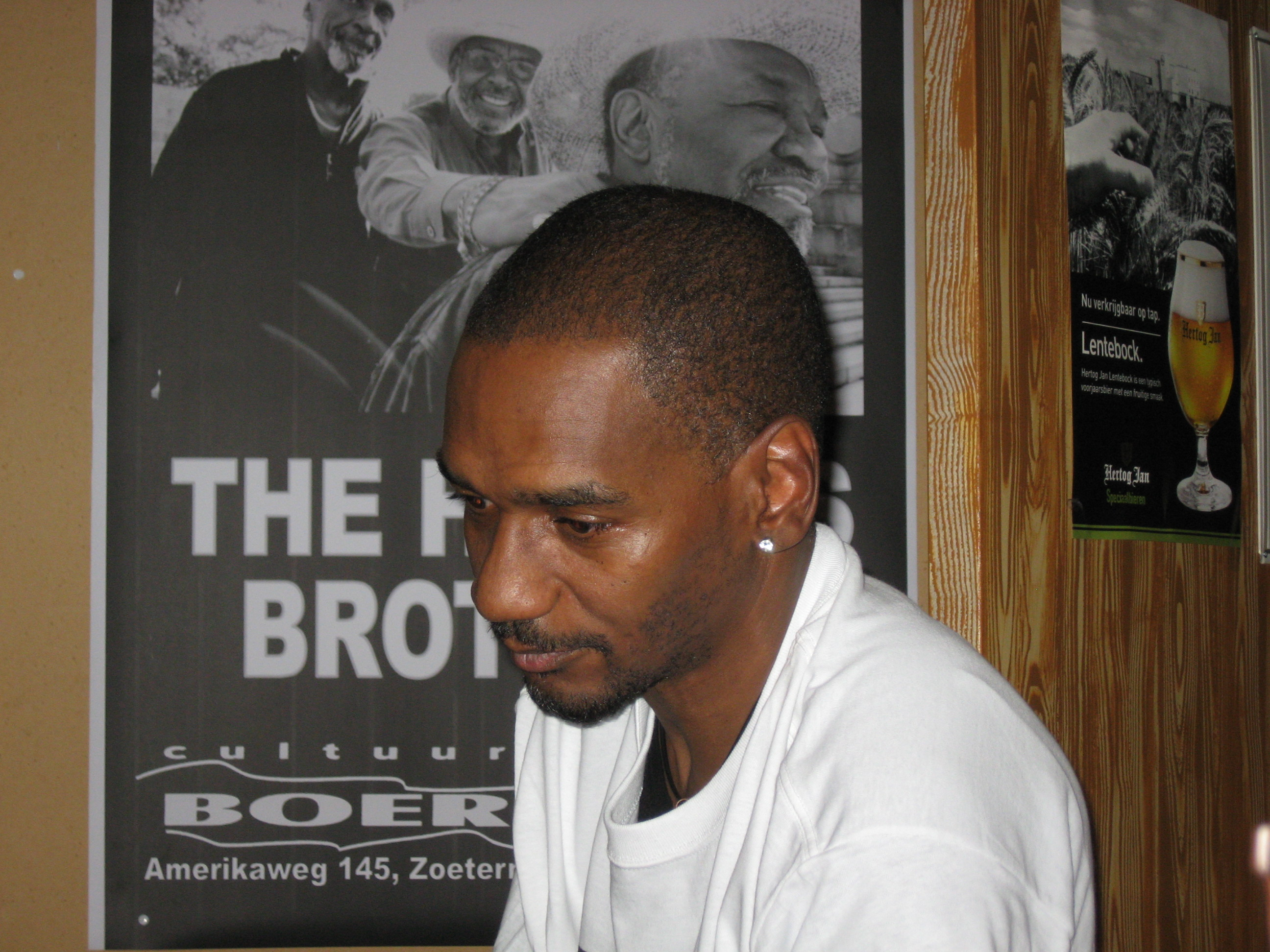
- Bailey in 2008

Background information
- Born: March 27, 1960; Philadelphia, Pennsylvania, U.S.
- Died: November 11, 2016 (aged 56) Stafford, Virginia, U.S.
- Genres: Jazz, jazz fusion, pop
- Occupation: Musician
- Instrument: Bass
- Years active: 1980–2016
- Labels: Atlantic, Zebra, ESC, Chesky
- Formerly of: Weather Report

Victor Bailey (March 27, 1960 – November 11, 2016) was an American bass guitar player. He was the bassist for Weather Report during their final years from 1982 to 1986, and launched a solo career in 1988. As a musician, Bailey was known for his signature scat-bass solos.

== Biography ==
Born in Philadelphia, on 27 March 1960, Victor Randall Bailey was raised by a highly musical family. His father, Morris Bailey Jr., was an active musician and composer, while his uncle, Donald "Duck" Bailey, was a jazz drummer, who played on numerous Blue Note records (e.g., Jimmy Smith Trio, Hampton Hawes, Carmen McRae, Dizzy Gillespie). As a child, Bailey played the drums, but ultimately switched to bass guitar after the bassist in his neighborhood band walked out of a band practice. Because young Victor took an immediate liking to the instrument, his father encouraged him to become a bass player. Beginning in 1978, at the age of 18, Bailey attended the Berklee College of Music in Boston after being disqualified from naval service due to asthma.

Like his father, Bailey suffered from Charcot–Marie–Tooth disease for most of his adult life. As the disease progressed, Bailey began using a cane to offset his weakened legs. The weakness finally spread to his upper body, necessitating his 2015 retirement from performing and from his teaching position at Berklee College of Music. He died on 11 November 2016 in Stafford, VA, likely from complications from Charcot-Marie-Tooth disease and amyotrophic lateral sclerosis (Lou Gehrig's disease).

Bailey played a 1986 Pensa-Suhr J-4 koa bass and a fretless Ibanez Roadstar among others. His instruments were auctioned by Skinner. The J-4 sold for $10,455 US Bailey had a series of remarkable contributions as the main bassist for American jazz fusion band Weather Report, for which he played on four of their studio albums between 1983 and 1986.

Fender released a Victor Bailey Signature acoustic bass guitar, as well as the Victor Bailey Jazz Bass (Artist series), available in 4, 5-string, fretted and fretless versions. Bailey also used Markbass amplifiers.

== Discography ==
=== As leader/co-leader ===
- Bottom's Up (Atlantic, 1989)
- Petite Blonde with Dennis Chambers, Mitch Forman, Chuck Loeb, and Bill Evans (Lipstick, 1992)
- Low Blow (Zebra, 1999)
- That's Right! (ESC, 2001)
- Electric with Larry Coryell and Lenny White (Chesky, 2005)
- Traffic with Larry Coryell and Lenny White (Chesky, 2006)
- Slippin' 'n' Trippin' (Studio V Productions, 2009)

=== As a member ===
Weather Report

- Procession (Columbia, 1983)
- Domino Theory (Columbia, 1984)
- Sportin' Life (Columbia, 1985)
- This Is This! (Columbia, 1986)

Steps Ahead

- Magnetic (Elektra, 1986)
- Vibe (NYC, 1995)

=== As sideman ===
- Michael Brecker, Now You See It... (Now You Don't) (GRP, 1990)
- Omar Hakim, Rhythm Deep (GRP, 1989)
- Urban Knights, Urban Knights I (GRP, 1995)
