= The White Goblin (Masayoshi Takanaka album) =

Niji Densetsu II: The White Goblin

Studio album by Masayoshi Takanaka
- Released: 25 June 1997
- Genres: Jazz fusion, progressive rock, funk, pop
- Length: 59:17
- Label: EMI
- Producer: Masayoshi Takanaka

Masayoshi Takanaka chronology
Guitar Wonder (1996)	Niji Densetsu II: The White Goblin (1997)	Bahama (1998)

Niji Densetsu II: The White Goblin (Japanese: 虹伝説II～THE WHITE GOBLIN～) is the twenty-sixth studio album by Japanese musician, producer and composer Masayoshi Takanaka, released by EMI in 1997. The album features a much darker jazz fusion style compared to its predecessor The Rainbow Goblins along with progressive rock, funk and pop.

== Background ==
Niji Densetsu II: The White Goblin is the first-ever vinyl pressing on yellow translucent vinyl, housed in a gatefold sleeve with folded insert. It was re-released as part of the 40th anniversary of The Rainbow Goblins. Additionally, the album is inspired by The White Goblin by Ul de Rico.

== Reception ==
The album was reviewed by CDJournal.

== Track listing ==
All music is composed and arranged by Masayoshi Takanaka. Adapted from LP liner notes:

No.	Title	Length
1.	"Heaven and Earth"	5:36
2.	"Who?"	4:30
3.	"Away"	5:31
4.	"Goblin's Theme"	5:26
5.	"Cave City"	4:51
6.	"March for Colors"	3:34
7.	"Monochrome"	5:09
8.	"Smoke"	4:47
9.	"Died Out"	5:20
10.	"Gray"	4:17
11.	"Into the Sky"	5:45
12.	"Morning of Creation ~ You Can Never Come to This Place"	4:31
Total length:		59:17

== Personnel ==
Credits and personnel adapted from liner notes.

- Masayoshi Takanaka – guitars, programming (all tracks except 2, 10)
- Ulful Keisuke – guitars (3)
- Char – guitars (8)
- Chuei Yoshikawa – acoustic guitar (1)
- Satoshi Takebe – keyboard (10)
- Ken Yoshida – bass (1, 11)
- Ray Ohara – bass (2, 3, 5, 6)
- Shuichi "Ponta" Murakami – drums (8)
- Shinozaki Strings – strings (1, 12)
- Chris Mosdell – narration (1, 12)
- Janet L. Donnelly – narration (2, 3, 5)
- Chris Pepper – narration (4, 6-11)
- Naoki "Taro" Suzuki – additional programming (1, 6, 8, 9)
- Koji Takata – additional programming (3, 5, 7), programming (4)
- Keiji Tanabe – additional programming (9), programming (11)
- Tetsuo Otake – programming (10)

== Charts ==
This album reached number 30 on the Oricon Albums Chart, and spent six weeks in that chart.

== Release history ==
Release history for The White Goblin
Region	Date	Formats	Label	Ref.
Japan	25 June 1997	CD	EMI	
Japan	17 November 2021	CD (Remastered)	Universal Music Japan	

== Into the Sky ==
The single Into the Sky was the closing theme of Sports Urugusu.

== See also ==
- List of best-selling singles in 1997 (Japan)
- The Rainbow Goblins
