= Portillo (surname) =

Portillo is a surname of Castilian origin, specifically San Vicente de la Barquera in Santander, Spain.

Portillo literally means "small port", from Latin portus.

== Popularity ==
Currently in Spain there are 6,554 people using Portillo as last name. It is the 725th most common surname in Spain.

Persons named Portillo in Spain by province:

| City Where Portillo is Common | By Region in Spain | Persons Named Portillo |
|---|---|---|
| Málaga | 127° | 1 376 |
| Guadalajara | 264° | 362 |
| Sevilla | 556° | 696 |
| Canarias | 770° | 366 |
| Barcelona | 1 327° | 870 |
| Baleares | 1 384° | 358 |
| Madrid | 1 646° | 856 |

== People with this name ==
- Álex Portillo (born 1992), Spanish footballer
- Alfonso Portillo (born 1951), Guatemalan ex-president
- Alonso Hernández del Portillo (1543–1624), Spanish historian
- Blanca Portillo (born 1963), Spanish actress
- César Portillo (born 1968), Venezuelan basketball player
- Chantal Portillo (born 1957), French writer
- Dick Portillo, founder of Portillo's Restaurants
- Edwin Portillo (born 1962), Salvadoran footballer and manager
- Erik Portillo (born 2000), Swedish ice hockey player
- Gabe Portillo, American bass player for P.O.D
- Isaac Portillo (born 1994), Salvadoran footballer
- Javier G. Portillo (born 1982), Spanish footballer
- Jesús Portillo (born 1999), Argentine footballer
- José López Portillo (1920-2004), former President of Mexico
- Lourdes Portillo (born 1944), Chicana filmmaker
- Luis Gabriel Portillo (1907-1993), Professor, politician, exile and writer
- María Portillo (born 1972), Peruvian marathon runner
- María Portillo Ramírez (born 1999), Mexican tennis player
- Michael Portillo (born 1953), British politician and television presenter
- Miguel Alfredo Portillo (born 1982), Argentine footballer
- Pablo Portillo (born 1984), Mexican singer
- Patricia Portillo (born 1974), Spanish freestyle skier
- Rafael Portillo (1916–1995), Mexican filmmaker
- Samuel Portillo (born 1994), Argentine-Paraguayan footballer
- Sergio Portillo (born 1955), Venezuelan/American painter and sculptor
- Veronica Portillo (born 1977), American reality show contestant

== See also ==
- Portillo (disambiguation)
- Portillo's Restaurants
