= Jake H. Concepcion =

Jake Hernandez Concepcion
- Born: January 13, 1936; Philippines
- Died: December 4, 2017 (aged 81)

Jake Hernandez Concepcion (13 January 1936 – 4 December 2017) was a saxophone player and session musician. Born in the Philippines, Concepcion spent the majority of his career in Japan.

== Early life ==
Concepcion was born in the Philippines on 13 January 1936. He moved to Japan on his own in 1959 at the age of 23.

== Discography ==
- Screen Music for Car-Mania (with The Sound Limited) (1972)
- Emotion (1973)
- Resa (1978)
- Pieces Of Love (1981)
- J (1983)
- Jake Concepcion Plays Standards: Misty (1985)
- Unchained Melody (1991)

== Additional credits ==
Full list of additional credits/collaborations showing year, album, artist, and credit.

Year	Album	Artist	Credit
1976	Seychelles	Masayoshi Takanaka	Saxophone
1977	Takanaka	Masayoshi Takanaka	Alto saxophone
1978	Benisuzume	Yumi Matsutoya	Saxophone, clarinet, chorus
1978	Mignonne	Taeko Onuki	Saxophone, flute
1978	Lupin III Original Soundtrack	You & The Explosion Band, Sandra Hohn, Tommy Snyder/You & The Explosion Band	Saxophone
1981	A Long Vacation	Eiichi Ohtaki	Flute
1983	Reincarnation	Yumi Matsutoya	Saxophone, flute
1983	Mint	Meiko Nakahara	Saxophone
1985	Traumatic Kyokutotanteyidan	Masayoshi Takanaka	Saxophone
1986	S.P.O.R.T.S.	T-Square	Saxophone
1986	36.5 °C	Miyuki Nakajima	Alto saxophone, soprano saxophone
1988	Mi-ha	Chisato Moritaka	Tenor saxophone
1991	Artisan	Tatsuro Yamashita	Tenor saxophone
1993	Wagamama na Actress	Miho Nakayama	Saxophone
1996	Deep Lip French	Miho Nakayama	Saxophone
1996	True	L'Arc-en-Ciel	Alto saxophone, clarinet
1999	Fever Fever	Puffy AmiYumi	Tenor saxophone
