= Brasilian Skies =

Studio album by Masayoshi Takanaka
- Released: July 21, 1978
- Recorded: 1978
- Studios: PolyGram Studios, Rio de Janeiro; Westlake Studios, Los Angeles
- Genre: Jazz fusion
- Length: 47:33
- Label: Kitty Records
- Producer: Masayoshi Takanaka

Masayoshi Takanaka chronology
An Insatiable High (1977)	Brasilian Skies (1978)	On Guitar (1978)

Brasilian Skies is the fourth studio album by Japanese musician, producer and composer Masayoshi Takanaka, released by Kitty Records on July 21, 1978. It was initially released on vinyl and cassette. The album features jazz fusion with bossa nova, samba, and progressive rock and soul.

== Background ==
Masayoshi traveled to Brazil in 1978 to record part of the album at PolyGram's studios in Barra da Tijuca, Rio de Janeiro. The remainder of the record was recorded at Westlake Studios in Los Angeles, California.

In 2018, Masayoshi held a 40th anniversary tour of the album's release in Japan with the theme of Brasilian Skies. The five-show concert tour commenced on September 22 at the Hitomi Memorial Hall in Tokyo and ended on October 28 in Osaka. A live album recording from his performance at the Tokyo Hibiya Open-Air Concert Hall on October 13 was released on May 22, 2019.

== Track listing ==
All music is composed by Masayoshi Takanaka, except the song, "I Remember Clifford" by Benny Golson, and the song, "Star Wars Samba" by John Williams. All arrangements by Masayoshi Takanaka.

Brasilian Skies track listing
No.	Title	Length
1.	"Beleza Pula"	7:53
2.	"Brasilian Skies"	5:53
3.	"Nights"	4:54
4.	"I Remember Clifford"	5:25
5.	"Star Wars Samba"	3:45
6.	"Disco 'B'"	6:39
7.	"Funky Holo Holo Bird"	6:16
8.	"Izu Amanatsu Nattō Uri" (伊豆甘夏納豆売り)	6:49
Total length:		47:33

== Personnel ==
Credits and personnel adapted from liner notes

- Masayoshi Takanaka – guitar, production, remixing
- Haruko Kuwana – backing vocals
- Maria Aparecida De Souza – backing vocals
- Maria Helena Violin – backing vocals
- Maria Rita Kfouri – backing vocals
- Marlo Henderson – guitar
- Daudeth De Azevedo – cavaquinho
- Ryuichi Sakamoto – keyboards, strings
- Sergio Carvalho – keyboards
- Kiyosumi Ishikawa – keyboards
- Greg Phillinganes – keyboards
- Scott Edwards – bass guitar
- Abraham Laboriel – bass guitar
- Sergio Barrozo Neto – bass guitar
- Sergio Portillo – bass guitar
- Getao Takahashi – bass guitar
- James Gadson – drums
- Shigeru "Shi-chan" Inoue – drums
- Wilson das Neves – drums
- Jeff Porcaro – drums
- Keiko Yamakawa – harp
- Motoya Hamaguchi – percussion, flute
- Paulinho da Costa – percussion
- Hermes Coutesini – percussion
- Elizeu Félix – percussion
- Antenor Marques Filho – percussion
- Nilton Delfino Marçal – percussion
- Luna do Pander – percussion
- Altamiro Coelho Rosa – percussion
- Tokio Shibata – production assistance
- Hiromi Yasuda – production assistance
- Cláudio Conde – music coordination
- Naomi Niimura – music coordination
- Olivia Page – music coordination
- Masaru Takagi – engineering, remixing
- Ary Carvalhaes – engineering
- Stephen Hodge – engineering
- Julinho – assistant engineer
- Dave Rideau – assistant engineer
- Koichi Chigi – design
- Hidenori Taga – executive production

== Charts ==
Chart performance for Brasilian Skies
Chart (2026)	Peak position
US Top Contemporary Jazz Albums (Billboard)	14

== Release history ==
Release history for Brasilian Skies
Region	Date	Formats	Label	Ref.
Japan	July 21, 1978	Vinyl; cassette	Kitty Records	
Japan	1987	CD	Kitty Records	
Japan	June 26, 2013	CD (Remastered)	Universal Music Japan	

== See also ==
- 1978 in Japanese music
