= Mignonne (album) =

Studio album by Taeko Ohnuki
- Released: September 21, 1978
- Genre: City pop
- Length: 42:45
- Language: Japanese
- Label: RCA/RVC
- Producer: Eji Ogura

Taeko Ohnuki chronology
Sunshower (1977)	Mignonne (1978)	Romantique (1980)

Singles from Mignonne
- 1. "じゃじゃ馬娘" Released: 21 September 1978

Professional reviews
Review scores
Source	Rating
Sputnikmusic	4.0/5

Mignonne is the third studio album by Japanese singer-songwriter Taeko Onuki (spelled "Ohnuki" at the time of release), released on 21 September 1978 by RCA/RVC. The album features the song "4:00 A.M.", which has become Onuki's most popular song, with over 147 million streams on Spotify as of May 2026.

== Background ==
Onuki expressed feeling a lack of control working with Eji Ogura on the production of Mignonne. As it was her first album with RCA/RVC, Onuki felt that the label wanted the album to sell well and therefore did not allow her as much creative freedom as she had had in the past.

== Track listing ==
All tracks are written by Taeko Ohnuki.

Side A
No.	Title	Length
1.	"じゃじゃ馬娘 (Jajauma Musume)"	4:55
2.	"横顔 (Yokogao)"	3:24
3.	"黄昏れ (Tasogare)"	3:43
4.	"空をとべたら (Sora Wo Tobetara)"	3:40
5.	"風のオルガン (Kaze No Organ)"	3:20

Side B
No.	Title	Length
6.	"言いだせなくて (Iidasenakute)"	3:52
7.	"4:00 A.M."	5:34
8.	"突然の贈りもの (Totsuzen No Okurimono)"	5:02
9.	"海と少年 (Umi To Syounen)"	3:22
10.	"あこがれ (Akogare)"	5:53

== Personnel ==
Credits adapted from the album's liner notes.

=== Musicians ===
- Taeko Onuki — vocals
- Ichizô Seo — chorus (track 1)
- Michiru Maki — chorus (track 1)
- Michiko Ogata — chorus (track 1)
- Tatsushi Umegaki — chorus (tracks 1, 7, 10)
- Hide Kotaro — chorus (tracks 7, 10)
- Kayoko Iju — chorus (tracks 6, 7, 9, 10)
- Natsuko Wada — chorus (tracks 6, 7, 9, 10)
- Hiroko Suzuki — chorus (tracks 6, 7, 9, 10)
- Chuei Yoshikawa — guitar (tracks 3–5, 10)
- Kimio Mizutani — guitar (tracks 1)
- Kiyoshi Sugimoto — guitar (tracks 2, 4)
- Masaki Matsubara — guitar (tracks 6, 9)
- Masayoshi Takanaka — guitar (track 10)
- Shigeru Suzuki — guitar (tracks 1–5, 9, 10)
- Tsunehide Matsuki — guitar (tracks 1, 7, 8)
- Tsugutoshi Gotō — bass (tracks 1, 4, 5)
- Kenji Takamizu — bass (track 2)
- Haruomi Hosono — bass (tracks 3, 6–10)
- Tatsuo Hayashi — drums (tracks 1, 4)
- Kiyoshi Tanaka — drums (tracks 2, 5)
- Yukihiro Takahashi — drums (tracks 3, 9, 10)
- Shuichi "Ponta" Murakami — drums (track 6)
- Yuichi Togashiki — drums (tracks 7, 8)
- Hideo Ichikawa — keyboards (track 2)
- Hiroshi Shibui — keyboards (tracks 1, 2, 4, 5)
- Ryuichi Sakamoto — keyboards (tracks 6–9), piano (tracks 3, 10)
- Keiko Yamakawa — harp (track 5)
- Matsue Yamahata — harp (tracks 6, 8)
- Kiyoshi Saito — horns (track 1)
- Shunzo Sunahara — horns (track 1)
- Jake H. Concepcion — flute (track 7), saxophone (track 1)
- Mitsuru Soma — flute (track 4)
- Yukio Eto — flute (track 4)
- Yasuaki Shimizu — tenor saxophone (track 6)
- Shigeharu Mukai — trombone (track 3)
- Eiji Arai — trombone (tracks 6, 7)
- Harumi Mita — trombone (tracks 6, 7)
- Sumio Okada — trombone (tracks 6, 7)
- Yasuo Hirauchi — trombone (tracks 6, 7)
- Michio Kagiwada — trombone (track 7)
- Mamoru Otake — trumpet (tracks 6, 7)
- Shin Kazuhara — trumpet (tracks 6, 7)
- Kumiyama Tokiichi— trumpet (tracks 6, 7)
- Ohno Group — strings (tracks 3, 8–10)
- Tomato Strings Ensemble — strings (tracks 1, 5)
- Motoya Hamaguchi — percussion (tracks 3, 6–10)
- Masahito "Pecker" Hashida — percussion (tracks 1, 4, 5)

=== Technical and design ===
- Eji Ogura — producer
- Ichizô Seo — arrangements (tracks 1, 2, 4, 5, 10)
- Ryuichi Sakamoto — arrangements (tracks 3, 6–9)
- Shigeki Miyata — recording supervisor
- Eiji Uchinuma — recording engineer
- Tamotsu Yoshida — recording engineer
- Kōchū Onishi — photographer
- Kenichi Makimura — director
- Yoshio Sugiyama — hair and make-up
- Minoru Maeda — stylist

== Charts ==
On 23 May 2018, a vinyl version of Mignonne, remastered by Bernie Grundman, was released. The 2018 remastered vinyl version charted on the Oricon music charts with a peak position of 30.

== See also ==
- 1978 in Japanese music
