= Alone (Masayoshi Takanaka album) =

Studio album by Masayoshi Takanaka
- Released: 10 December 1981
- Recorded: 1981
- Genres: Jazz fusion; funk; pop
- Length: 46:43
- Label: Kitty
- Producer: Masayoshi Takanaka

Masayoshi Takanaka chronology
The Rainbow Goblins (1981)	Alone (1981)	Saudade (1982)

Alone is the tenth studio album by Japanese musician, producer, and composer Masayoshi Takanaka, released by Kitty Records on 10 December 1981. Musically, Alone blends jazz fusion with elements of city pop, funk, and touches of electronic music. The album features the title track "Alone". Another track, "Penguin Dancer", gained renewed attention after being sampled by Grimes.

== Background ==
Alone followed the release of The Rainbow Goblins in 1981.

== Track listing ==
All tracks are written by Masayoshi Takanaka, except lyrics on "Penguin Dancer" by Choux Suzuki.

Alone track listing
No.	Title	Length
1.	"Speed Of Love"	5:17
2.	"Feedback's Feel"	5:51
3.	"Alone"	5:41
4.	"The Night Delay"	6:18
5.	"She's Rain"	6:21
6.	"リオの夢"	7:36
7.	"はいやぁ～っ！"	4:24
8.	"Penguin Dancer"	5:15
Total length:		46:43

== Personnel ==
Credits and personnel adapted from liner notes

- Bass guitar: Getao Takahashi (tracks: A1, A3), Masakazu Goto (tracks: B4), Yasuo Tomikura (tracks: A2, A4-B2)
- Drums: Masahiro Miyazaki (tracks: B4); Yuichi Togashiki (tracks: A1-B3)
- Keyboards: Haruo Togashi (tracks: A4, B2), Hiroki Inui (tracks: A1, A3); Kiyosumi Ishikawa (tracks: A2, B1, B4); Yoshinobu Maruyama (tracks: A1, B3); Yuji Kawashima (tracks: A1, A3-B2, B4)
- Percussion: Makoto Kimura (tracks: B4); Susumu Ohno (tracks: B4); Yuki Sugawara (tracks: A2, A3, B2, B4)
- Strings – Kato Grop (tracks: A4, B1)
- Violin – Masahiro Takekawa (tracks: B3)
- Vocals – Choux Suzuki (tracks: A1, B3), Masaki Ueda (tracks: A1)
- Producer, arranger, composer, electric guitar: Masayoshi Takanaka
- Lyricist: Choux Suzuki (tracks: B4)

== Charts ==
The album reached number 5 on the Oricon chart. The album reached number 6 in the Music Labo albums chart, having debuted at number 10. It reached number 5 on the Cash Box of Japan LPs chart published on 23 January 1982, but no Japanese chart was published in either the preceding or following weeks.

== Release history ==
Release history for Alone
Region	Date	Formats	Label	Catalogue number
Japan	10 December 1981	Vinyl; cassette	Kitty Records	28MK0025; 28CK0030
Japan	1990	CD	Kitty Records	KTCR-1019
Japan	24 May 1997	CD (reissue)	Universal Music Japan	KTCR-1549

== See also ==
- 1981 in Japanese music
