= Can I Sing? =

Studio album by Masayoshi Takanaka
- Released: 5 October 1983
- Recorded: 1983
- Genre: Jazz fusion; funk; pop
- Length: 38:36
- Label: Kitty
- Producer: Masayoshi Takanaka

Masayoshi Takanaka chronology
Saudade (1982)	Can I Sing? (1983)	Natsu Zen Kai (1984)

Can I Sing? is the twelfth studio album by Japanese musician, producer, and composer Masayoshi Takanaka, released by Kitty Records on 5 October 1983.

== Charts ==
The album reached number 2 on the Oricon chart. It reached number 2 on the Music Labo albums chart, having debuted at number 7. It reached number 2 on the Cash Box of Japan LPs chart published on 12 November 1983, but no Japanese chart was published the following week.

== Single ==
The single Jumping Take Off reached number 70 on the Oricon Singles Chart.

== Track listing ==
All music is composed by Masayoshi Takanaka.

No.	Title	Lyrics	Length
1.	"Tokyo…Singin' in the City"	Diane Silverthorn	3:19
2.	"我ら星の子" (Warera Boshi no Ko, "Us Children of the Stars")		3:39
3.	"Sail on Fire"	Chris Mosdell	4:24
4.	"Straight from Your Heart"	Mosdell	3:42
5.	"Jumping Take Off"		4:16
6.	"Santigo Bay Rendez-Vous"	Silverthorn	4:26
7.	"Funk'n'Roll Train"		2:53
8.	"Cry Baby Cry"		4:19
9.	"Noon"	Etsuko Kisugi	3:04
10.	"Can I Sing…For You"		4:36

== Personnel ==
Credits and personnel adapted from liner notes.

- Masayoshi Takanaka – electric guitar, other instruments, arrangements, string arranement (4)
- Yuji Toriyama – rhythm guitar, additional keyboards, programming
- Ken Morimura – keyboards, horn arrangement (7), string arrangement (10)
- Yuji Kawashima – additional keyboards (1, 2, 6–8)
- Chiharu Mikuzuki – bass guitar (1, 7–10)
- Getao Takahashi – bass guitar (2)
- Kayoko Ishu – aria (2)
- Masahiro Miyazaki – drums (3, 4, 7, 9, 10)
- Eve – chorus (3, 4)
- Yoshihiro Naruse – bass guitar (3)
- Yuhji Nakamura – bass guitar (4, 6)
- Kato Group – strings (4)
- Takao Kisugi – vocals (9)
- Ohno Group – strings (10)
- Masayoshi Tananaka – producer
- Teruaki Igarashi – engineer
- Susumu Yamazaki – assistant engineer
- Studio Champ – cover design
- Hiroyuki Ishikura – cover illustration
- Masayoshi Sukita – photography
- Choux Suzuki – A&R, creative director
- Hidenori Taga – executive producer

== See also ==
- 1983 in Japanese music
