= On Guitar =

Studio album by Masayoshi Takanaka
- Released: November 25, 1978
- Recorded: 1978
- Studios: Sound City Studio, Media Studio
- Genres: Jazz fusion; city pop; jazz-funk
- Length: 43:28
- Label: Victor
- Producer: Hiroshi Tanaka

Masayoshi Takanaka chronology
Brasilian Skies (1978)	On Guitar (1978)	Jolly Jive (1979)

On Guitar is a studio album by Japanese musician, producer, and composer Masayoshi Takanaka, released by Invitation Records in November 1978. The album's initial release was distributed on vinyl and cassette tape, and was re-released on CD in 1994. The album is part of the Professional High-Technique Series, a set of three albums released in 1978 by Victor Entertainment. These albums, intended for instrument instruction, feature material focused on guitar, bass, and drums. Tsugutoshi Gotō's On Bass and Hiro Tsunoda's On Drums are the other two albums in the series.

This album features a mix of original songs and covers from established acts such as Bobby Womack, Billy Joel, George Benson, Carlos Santana, and Earth, Wind & Fire. The original record release came with a sheet detailing the effect pedals used.

Despite it being his fifth LP released, it is not mentioned on Takanaka's website, and Jolly Jive is widely considered to be his fifth album.

== Track listing ==
Side A
No.	Title	Writer(s)	Length
1.	"Breezin'"	Bobby Womack	5:50
2.	"Blue Curacao"	Masayoshi Takanaka	5:28
3.	"Just the Way You Are"	Billy Joel	5:08
4.	"Mambo Jambo"	Perez Prado	3:11

Side B
No.	Title	Writer(s)	Length
5.	"Samba Pa Ti"	Carlos Santana	5:44
6.	"Rainbow"	Masayoshi Takanaka	6:13
7.	"That's the Way of the World"	Earth, Wind & Fire	6:14
8.	"We're All Alone"	Boz Scaggs	5:38
Total length:			43:28

== Personnel ==
Credits and personnel adapted from liner notes

- A&R, associate producer – Hiroshi Tanaka
- Art direction – Ryu Inishie
- Bass – Getao Takahashi, Haruomi Hosono
- Coordinator – Shingi Kurata
- Design – Front Publicity Inc.
- Drums – Robert Brill, Yukihiro Takahashi
- Engineer – Osamu Yamanishi, Shozo Inomata
- Assistant engineer – Shuji Yamaguchi
- Executive producer – Akira Higashimoto
- Guitar, producer, arranger – Masayoshi Takanaka
- Keyboards – Kiyosumi Ishikawa
- Recording directed by Toyoho Ryujin
- Mastered by Shizuo Nomiyama
- Musical assistance – Akitoshi Kimura
- Percussion – Motoya Hamaguchi, Pecker
- Photography by Yoichi Iwase, Yukio Hasemi
- Recorded by Osamu Yamanishi, Shozo Inomata

== Charts ==
Chart performance for On Guitar
Chart (2026)	Peak position
US Top Contemporary Jazz Albums (Billboard)	5
US Top Jazz Albums (Billboard)	18

== Release history ==
Release history for On Guitar
Region	Date	Formats	Label	Ref.
Japan	November 25, 1978	Cassette	Invitation	
Japan	November 25, 1978	Vinyl	Invitation	
Japan	June 25, 1994	CD	Invitation	
Japan	July 20, 2016	CD (remastered)	Invitation	
Japan	March 22, 2025	Vinyl (Limited edition reissue)	Invitation	

== See also ==
- 1978 in Japanese music
