= The Rainbow Goblins (album) =

Studio album by Masayoshi Takanaka
- Released: 10 March 1981
- Recorded: 1981
- Studios: Kitty Izu Studio, Izu; Polydor Studio, Tokyo; KRS Studio
- Genres: Jazz fusion, funk, pop
- Length: 68:31
- Label: Kitty Records
- Producer: Masayoshi Takanaka

Masayoshi Takanaka chronology
Finger Dancin' (1980)	The Rainbow Goblins (1981)	Alone (1981)

The Rainbow Goblins (虹伝説, Niji Densetsu; lit. "Legend of the Rainbow") is the ninth studio album by Japanese musician, producer, and composer Masayoshi Takanaka, released by Kitty Records on 10 March 1981.

Inspired by the picture book of the same name by Italian artist Ul de Rico, Takanaka set out to create a fully realized concept album. Influenced by progressive rock bands like King Crimson and Pink Floyd, he blended his signature guitar work with layered arrangements and vivid soundscapes to match the book's visual and narrative depth. The result is one of his most ambitious and imaginative works.

== Background ==
The Rainbow Goblins tells the story of seven goblins who each survive by stealing the colors of rainbows. We follow them as they journey through valleys, forests, and mountains in search of the legendary Valley of Rainbows. As they close in on their goal, nature turns against them. In the end, the rainbow pulls its colors away, and the goblins are defeated, ending with the powerful final track, "You Can Never Come to This Place", featuring a guitar solo from Takanaka.

On release day, 10 March 1981, the album was performed live in full at Nippon Budokan and released on video. Several songs, however, were cut from the final footage.

In recent years, The Rainbow Goblins has gained new recognition as interest in city pop and jazz fusion has grown. The creator of "Takanaka Vibes" was inspired by the video.

== Reception ==
The album has been described as an "iconic" "touchstone".

== Track listing ==
All tracks are written by Masayoshi Takanaka.

The Rainbow Goblins track listing
No.	Title	Lyrics	Length
1.	"Prologue"		3:16
2.	"Once Upon A Song"		5:10
3.	"Seven Goblins"		3:10
4.	"The Sunset Valley"	Choux Suzuki	4:20
5.	"The Moon Rose"		5:38
6.	"Soon"		6:26
7.	"Magical Night Light"		1:52
8.	"Rainbow Paradise"	Masayoshi Takanaka	5:04
9.	"Thunderstorm"		3:11
10.	"Rising Arch"		4:48
11.	"Just Chuckle"	Choux Suzuki	3:42
12.	"Rainbow Was Reborn"		5:55
13.	"Plumed Bird"		7:31
14.	"You Can Never Come To This Place"		8:05
Total length:			1:08:31

== Personnel ==
Credits and personnel adapted from liner notes

- 高中正義 [Masayoshi Takanaka] — guitar, composer, arrangements
- 星勝 [Katz Hoshi] — string arrangements
- 田中章弘 [Akihiro Tanaka] — bass
- 宮崎まさひろ [Masahiro Miyazaki] — drums
- 井上茂 [Shigeru Inoue] — drums
- 村上 "PONTA" 秀一 [Shuichi "PONTA" Murakami] — drums
- Susumu Yamazaki — percussion
- Kiyosumi Ishikawa — keyboards
- 小林泉美 [Izumi "Mimi" Kobayashi] — keyboards
- 木村誠 [Makoto Kimura] — percussion
- 菅原裕紀 [Yuki Sugawara] — percussion
- Koji Satsuma — saxophone
- Roy Garner — narrator
- Producer — Masayoshi Takanaka
- Coordinator [Production Coordination] — Akira Inoue
- Cover Art, Design [Card] — Tsunemi Morimoto
- Engineer [Mixer – Assistant] — Masahiro Taira, Susumu Yamazaki, 清水高志 [Takashi Shimizu]
- Executive Producer — Hidenori Taga
- Management [Artist Management], A&R [Direction] — Choux Suzuki
- Mixed By — Susumu Ohno, Ken Takagi
- Photography By — 三浦憲治 [Kenji Miura], Yoichi Nagata

== Charts ==
The album Niji Densetsu reached number 4 on the Music Labo albums chart, having debuted at number 7. The album reached number 2 on the Cash Box LPs chart, and number 3 on the Oricon chart.

== Awards ==
The album won a planning award (企画賞) at the 23rd Japan Record Awards.

== Use ==
The track "Thunderstorm" was the theme music of pro-wrestler Genichiro Tenryu.

== Single ==
"You Can Never Come To This Place" was released as a single in 1981. In 2025, it was included in The Smashing Machine soundtrack, which caused it be streamed more often.

== Release history ==
Release history for The Rainbow Goblins
Region	Date	Formats	Label	Ref.
Japan	10 March 1981	Vinyl; cassette	Kitty Records	
Japan	1984	CD	Kitty Records	
Japan	25 July 1990	CD (reissue)	Universal Music Japan	

== See also ==
- 1981 in Japanese music
