= Sunshower (Taeko Ohnuki album) =

Studio album by Taeko Onuki
- Released: July 25, 1977
- Recorded: May 13, 1977 – June 6, 1977
- Studios: Sound City, Tokyo; Crown Studio, Tokyo; Sound City (mixing); TOYO KASEI, Tokyo (mastering)
- Genre: City pop
- Length: 44:00
- Language: Japanese
- Label: PANAM
- Producers: Seiji Kuniyoshi; Akira Ikuta; Taeko Onuki (co-producer)

Taeko Onuki chronology
Grey Skies (1976)	Sunshower (1977)	Mignonne (1978)

Singles from Sunshower
- 1. "Summer Connection" Released: July 5, 1977; 2. ""Tokai" / "Kusuri wo Takusan"" Released: August 8, 2015

Sunshower (stylized in all caps) is the second studio album by Japanese singer-songwriter Taeko Onuki (spelled "Ohnuki" at the time of release), released on July 25, 1977. The album combines elements of J-pop, smooth jazz, rock and city pop. Despite being a commercial failure, with low sales at the time of its release, Sunshower slowly garnered critical acclaim and attention.

== Background ==
Recorded and released in 1977, Sunshower was Onuki's second solo album following the breakup of Sugar Babe in 1975, and her last original album under the PANAM label. According to the producer Seiji Kuniyoshi, it was more crossover-flavored than the first album (Note: Taeko Ohnuki (1976) Grey Skies.) which was closer to Sugar Babe. In those days, crossover was established and everyone was influenced more or less, so this direction was set naturally in the meeting for album production. It was decided that all songs would be arranged by Ryuichi Sakamoto, and also that the most talked-about musicians at the time would participate. On the other hand, they were thinking about adding a something like "authentic" flavor to it. At such time, in April 1977, a four-day benefit concert entitled the "Rolling Coconut Review" in Tokyo was held, and since Stuff participated in it, Kuniyoshi and others attended it in order to watch that jazz-funk band's stage. "Oh, this is it!" they got excited and had negotiation on the participation of the drummer Chris Parker on the spot. Kuniyoshi said it became a critical factor in determining the result of this album.

They decided to call in Parker from New York for 26 days from May 13 to June 6, and all the arrangements had to be completed before the drummer entered the studio. As a result, it was made in the shortest time among the albums that Onuki has made.

"When it comes to Sunshower," Onuki said, "the record company was not too keen on it, and also around that time the contracted agency dissolved, then there were none of others around me, leaving only Sakamoto and me. So, "I'll make it as I like!" I felt that way, regardless of whether the sales would well or not." According to her, just then, came so-called fusion or crossover, she was listening to it all the time, and she ended up being interested in the sound production and being sound oriented entirely. "In spite of I was a vocalist after all, I forgot about singing a little," she said, "I wonder if the sound was a little too noticeable, but I think it was a good album in those days. Also Sakamoto really put a lot of effort into it and made good arrangements".

In 2015, a 7" vinyl single coupled with "Tokai" and "Kusuri wo Takusan" was released as a limited edition. (Note: Taeko Ohnuki (2015) "Tokai" / "Kusuri wo Takusan".)

== Songs ==
Time (Is) of Sputnikmusic pointed out that the album benefits from two things: "it has the infectious catchiness of your regular old pop song in unison with soothing harmonies and a smoking hot band laying down grooves bound to worm its way into your head, and it has the capability to experiment with the pop art form and could afford to take risks with deep cuts such as the delicate ambiance of 'Sargasso Sea' and the classical-meets-funk fusion 'Furiko no Yagi' to back it up."

=== Side A ===
- "Summer Connection" – The opening number, "energetic and uplifting." The lyrics were written in the image of summer.
- "Kusuri wo Takusan" (くすりをたくさん; literally: "A Lot of Medicine") – A song criticizing the over-prescription of medicine. Rolling Stone's Jon Blistein wrote, "the funkiest song you'll ever hear about neurotic patients and the doctors all too happy to feed their angst with lots and lots of prescription drugs."
- "Nani mo Iranai" (何もいらない; literally: "I don't need anything") – Back then, Onuki was negative about the society and the surrounding environment, and she felt like washing away the whole world like rain and starting over from the beginning.
- "Tokai" (都会; literally: "City") – Yannick Gölz of laut.de wrote that the groove on this number "is alive, and the play of piano, drums and brass sounds dynamic, but the vocals of Onuki carry a formless melancholy in itself." According to Onuki, she has lived in Tokyo for a long time, been always particular about the city and the town, has sung such songs, and though it's often said that the loneliness, still she likes the city. However here, denies and criticizes the bright lights in the city. This is a her favorite song, and she said, "'Tokai' has a good arrangement, [...] . It's a bit like Stevie Wonder."
- "Karappo no Isu" (からっぽの椅子; literally: "Empty Chair") – A song about the loneliness in living alone, which was sung at Sugar Babe's last concert, too. It was made with the image of slow numbers in jazz, but Onuki didn't mean to make it completely jazz.

=== Side B ===
- "Law Of Nature" – It was composed in the image of Todd Rundgren's Utopia which Onuki liked. She said that it too, is a song which is critical, or raises a question and that it focuses on the desire to be natural.
- "Dare no Tame ni" (誰のために; literally: "For Whom") – According to Onuki, it's exactly a feeling of "a cry from the weak"—an appeal to the fact that you can't be recognized without a status or an honor and describes how much you can stick to your belief.
- "Silent Screamer" – This song is about the desire to escape, too and it's strong that an image of driving a car at a breakneck speed. According to Onuki, back then, the energy was quite full and at least in the music, she wanted to run wild.
- "Sargasso Sea" – A song sang on the theme of the Sargasso Sea, known for the legend of the ships being stranded and entangled with algae. Gölz said that it is a highlight of the second half and created some of the record's most fascinating musical textures: "Through fast, shrill synthesizer tremolos and from conspicuous high tones, the song creates a lost, nautical ambient atmosphere, short piano melodies create a sense of secluded wanderlust [...] —a striking contrast to the hitherto urban ambience."
- "Furiko no Yagi" (振子の山羊; literally: "Goat of the Pendulum") – The music was composed by Sakamoto and has the intro part by symphonic orchestra. It is symbolically described that things like end-time of humankind and the reincarnation.

== Artwork ==
Regarding the cover artwork based on white, Japanese studies scholar Laurence Green of SOAS University of London described that there's something about the cover art that presents a quiet, comfortable confidence, resting pretty in a chic, distinctly Japanese minimalism of white, and its unadorned style has utterly modernist in outlook, and yet somehow also avant-garde, primitive in its simplicity.

== Reception ==
Professional reviews
Review scores
Source	Rating
Sputnikmusic	4.7/5

Compared to her first album which drew a certain amount of attention, sales were lackluster. However, after that the album recognized as a masterpiece at the dawn of city pop and reissued repeatedly in the country.

As pop music adjusted to streaming delivery and city pop became popular among artists of the sample-based microgenres known as vaporwave and future funk, the album attracted the interest worldwide. The people playing on the album—including a pre-Yellow Magic Orchestra Ryuichi Sakamoto and Haruomi Hosono both, and Tatsuro Yamashita as well as Yasuaki Shimizu—also contributed to its status. (Note: "It's unbelievable to think we were all just 20-year-olds, because of how good everything sounds," Ohnuki looked back over the musicians playing on the album, and added, "Well, except the singing. [Laughs]")

Gölz described in laut.de that in this album, Onuki distilled the "Shape of J-Pop to Come" (Note: See The Shape of Jazz to Come.)—city pop—out of the zeitgeist. "The mixture of jazz, funk and pop gave birth to the album, it seems timeless in its pure beauty, yet so clearly shaped by the aesthetic conceptions of the time, which was able to only come about in exactly this line-up." Writing for Red Bull Music Academy Daily, Patrick St. Michel said that the album "proved to be a landmark in Japan's 'New Music' years, with limber jazz-fusion songs and easygoing grooves featuring lyrics about the over-prescription of medication." Laurence Green of SOAS University of London called it the best Japanese city pop album, saying, "In the midst of the floaty electric piano chords and noodling organ lines, it lays out a playground of musicianship in which Onuki can deliver some of the most irresistibly catchy top lines in the City Pop sub-genre." Time (Is) in Sputnikmusic wrote, "I won't go as far to say it's the 'definitive' City Pop album, but for a genre with very little to offer outside watered-down jazz funk clichés and folk pastiches, it's the closest you'll ever get to 'definitive'," and added, "To languor in decades of obscurity [...] without so much as seeing widespread reappraisal is unbecoming of an album like Sunshower, and only goes to show how ahead of its time it is [...] ."

== 2007 remastered CD ==
In 2007, the album CD was remastered and reissued in a limited edition as one of "Taeko Onuki CROWN YEARS Paper Sleeve Collection". It was supervised by Onuki and included mini-LP replica paper sleeve, three bonus tracks, and liner notes newly written by herself.

=== Bonus tracks ===
- "Summer Connection" was released as a single on 5 July 1977, (Note: Taeko Ohnuki (1977) "Summer Connection".) and was recorded by a different arrangement and players from the track on the album.
- "Heya" (部屋; literally: "Room"), the above single's coupling song, never previously appeared on any albums. This is an Onuki's favorite song, "I wanted to write the lyrics with the watercolor-like image such as red, the color of the sun," she said.
- "Kouryou" (荒涼; literally: "Bleakness") by lyrics: Yumi Matsutoya and music/arrangement: Masataka Matsutoya, was included in Masataka Matsutoya's album Yoru no Tabibito —Endless Flight— that Onuki participated as a guest vocalist. (Note: Masataka Matsutoya (1977) Yoru no Tabibito —Endless Flight— (夜の旅人 —Endless Flight—; literally: Night Traveler —Endless Flight—).)

== Release history ==
Region	Date	Format	Label	Catalog	Note	Ref.
Japan	July 25, 1977	LP	PANAM	GW-4029		
Japan	July 25, 1977	Cassette	CROWN	DCT-2196		
Japan	1984	2LP	PANAM	GWX-159/160	Grey Skies / SUNSHOWER, two-in-one reissue.	
Japan	September 21, 1984	LP	PANAM	GW-4107		
Japan	July 21, 1990	CD	PANAM	CRCP-28009		
Japan	May 21, 1991	2CD	PANAM	CRCP-28047	Grey Skies / SUNSHOWER, two-in-one reissue.	
Japan	July 21, 1993	CD	PANAM	CRCP-30012		
Japan	May 21, 1995	CD	PANAM	CRCP-141		
Japan	May 21, 1997	2CD	PANAM	CRCP-188/9	Grey Skies / SUNSHOWER, two-in-one reissue.	
Japan	October 3, 2007	CD	PANAM	CRCP-20409	"Taeko Ohnuki CROWN YEARS Paper Sleeve Collection".; Digitally remastered, limited edition.	
Japan	December 8, 2010	CD	PANAM	CRCP-20462	Blu-spec CD.; Oricon Weekly Albums Chart #82 (September 4, 2017).	
Japan	August 2, 2014	LP	PANAM	CRJ-1011	HMV record shop limited edition. (Note: Limited to 500 copies, it was re-pressed in 2016 and reached the 6th press in 2019.)	
Japan	October 8, 2016	Cassette	PANAM	CRT-1080	HMV record shop edition.	
Japan	August 8, 2020	LP	CROWN	CRJ-1016/1017	Numbered gatefold 2LP reissue.	

== Track listing ==
All tracks are written by Taeko Ohnuki, arranged by Ryuichi Sakamoto except where noted.

Side A
No.	Title	Length
1.	"Summer Connection"	4:29
2.	"くすりをたくさん (Kusuri wo takusan)"	4:07
3.	"何もいらない (Nani mo iranai)"	4:00
4.	"都会 (Tokai)"	5:09
5.	"からっぽの椅子 (Karappo no isu)"	5:35

Side B
No.	Title	Music	Length
1.	"Law of Nature"		3:46
2.	"誰のために (Dare no tame ni)"		5:30
3.	"Silent Screamer"		3:31
4.	"Sargasso Sea"		2:46
5.	"振子の山羊 (Furiko no yagi)"	Ryuichi Sakamoto	5:40

=== 2007 remastered CD ===
No.	Title	Lyrics	Music	Arranger	Length
1.	"Summer Connection"				4:30
2.	"Kusuri wo Takusan"				4:09
3.	"Nani mo Iranai"				4:01
4.	"Tokai"				5:10
5.	"Karappo no Isu"				5:34
6.	"Law of Nature"				3:47
7.	"Dare no Tame ni"				5:30
8.	"Silent Screamer"				3:32
9.	"Sargasso Sea"				2:47
10.	"Furiko no Yagi"		Ryuichi Sakamoto		5:40
11.	"Summer Connection"				4:12
12.	"Heya"				3:24
13.	"Kouryou"	Yumi Matsutoya	Masataka Matsutoya	Masataka Matsutoya	3:45

== Personnel ==
Credits adapted per album's liner notes. (Note: Romanized Japanese was available for many of credits on the liner notes, therefore in that case it was based on that representations.)

=== Musicians ===
- Ryuichi Sakamoto – keyboards (tracks 1–10)
- Yuh Imai – keyboards (tracks 1, 5)
- Kazumi Watanabe – guitar (tracks 3, 6)
- Kenji Ohmura – guitar (tracks 1–2, 4, 10)
- Tsunehide Matsuki – guitar (tracks 1, 3, 5, 6, 8, 10)
- Kohichi Hara – guitar (track 7)
- Haruomi Hosono – bass (tracks 2, 4, 7)
- Tsugutoshi Goto – bass (tracks 1, 3, 5, 6, 8, 10)
- Christopher Parker – drums (tracks 1–8, 10), tambourine (track 3)
- Nov Saitoh – percussion (tracks 1–3, 5–8, 10)
- Shigeharu Mukai – trombone (track 8)
- Yasuaki 'Sec' Shimizu – saxophone (tracks 4–5)
- Tatsuro Yamashita – background vocal (tracks 1–2, 4)
- Taeko Ohnuki – background vocal (tracks 1–2, 4)

=== Production ===
- Seiji Kuniyoshi – producer
- Akira Ikuta – producer
- Taeko Ohnuki – co-producer
- Ryuichi Sakamoto – musical direction and arrangements
- Shinich Tanaka – engineering
- Hiroko Horigami, Masako Hikasa – assistance
- Kazuhiro Sato – art direction
- Tohru Ohnuki – photography

=== 2007 remastered CD ===
==== Musicians (bonus tracks) ====
- Ryuichi Sakamoto – keyboards (tracks 11–12)
- Shigeru Suzuki – electric guitar (tracks 11–12)
- Tsunehide Matsuki – electric guitar (track 11)
- Akihiro Tanaka – bass (tracks 11–12)
- Shuichi Murakami – drums (track 11)
- Nov Saitoh – percussion (tracks 11–13)
- Chuei Yoshikawa – acoustic guitar (track 12)
- Tatsuo Hayashi – drums (tracks 12–13)
- Masataka Matsutoya – keyboards, vocal (track 13)
- Haruomi Hosono – Bass (track 13)
- Ryusuke Seto – Acoustic Guitar (track 13)

==== Production ====
- Taeko Ohnuki – supervision
- Yoshiro Nagato (BELIEVE IN MAGIC) – creative direction
- Masao Nakazato (ONKIO HAUS) – mastering
- Takashi Kubo (NIPPON CROWN) – production
- Sakae Yoshimoto (BELIEVE IN MAGIC) – design
- Kyoko Ooki (NIPPON CROWN) – design cooperation
- Seiji Kuniyoshi, Natsuko Harada (PROMAX), Masami Hikasa, Kennichi Makimura – cooperation

== Cover versions ==
Song	Artist(s)	Appearance	Release date	Format	Catalog	Ref.
"Tokai"	COUCH	Oto no Bouquet —Taeko Onuki Cover Collection—; (音のブーケ 大貫妙子 カヴァー集)	March 2, 2008	CD	CXCA-1225	
"Tokai"	Asako Toki	Summerin'	June 25, 2008	CD	RZCD-45913	
"Tokai"	Yasuyuki Okamura+Ryuichi Sakamoto	Onuki Taeko Tribute Album —Tribute To Taeko Onuki—; (大貫妙子トリビュート・アルバム —Tribute to Taeko Onuki—)	December 18, 2013	2CD	RZCM-59438/9	
"Tokai"	Erika.	unjour	June 19, 2013	CD	shiningwill-n-1	
"Nani mo Iranai"	RYUSENKEI (featuring Atsuko Hiyajo)	Natural Woman; (ナチュラル・ウーマン)	November 4, 2009	CD	HRAD-00041	

== See also ==
- 1977 in Japanese music

== Bibliography ==
- Anon.[a] (July 5, 1977). Samā Konekushon サマー・コネクション [Summer Connection] (7" 45 rpm vinyl) (in Japanese). 大貫妙子. PANAM / CROWN. ZP-29.
- Anon.[c] (November 25, 1977). Yoru no Tabibito —Endless Flight— 夜の旅人 —Endless Flight— [Night Traveler —Endless Flight—] (LP) (in Japanese). Masataka Matsutoya. PANAM / CROWN. GW-4033.
- Anon. (October 30, 1983). "MUSICIAN FILE Ōnuki Taeko Tettei kenkyū" MUSICIAN FILE 大貫妙子徹底研究 [Musician File: Taeko Ohnuki Intensive Study]. Myūjikku Sutedi ミュージック・ステディ [Music Steady] (monthly magazine) (in Japanese). Vol. 3, no. 4. ステディ出版 [Steady Publishing].
- Anon. (July 10, 2014). "News". HMV Record Shop ONLINE (in Japanese). ローソンエンタテインメント [Lawson Entertainment]. Archived from the original on June 24, 2015.
- Anon.[a] (August 24, 2016). "News". HMV Record Shop ONLINE (in Japanese). ローソンエンタテインメント.
- Anon.[b] (September 28, 2016). "News". HMV Record Shop ONLINE (in Japanese). ローソンエンタテインメント. Archived from the original on July 29, 2017.
- Anon. (February 19, 2019). "News". HMV Record Shop ONLINE (in Japanese). ローソンエンタテインメント.
- Anon.[a] (n.d.). "Ōnuki Taeko - Saishin Nyūsu" 大貫妙子 – 最新ニュース [Taeko Ohnuki - Latest News]. NIPPON CROWN (in Japanese). Archived from the original on October 12, 2007.
- Anon.[b] (n.d). 作品 [Works]. ORICON NEWS (in Japanese). Oricon.

1. "SUNSHOWER".
2. "Grey Skies/Sunshower".
3. "SUNSHOWER".
4. "SUNSHOWER".
5. "SUNSHOWER".

- Anon.[c] (n.d). 新譜情報 [New Releases Information]. CDJournal.com (in Japanese). シーディージャーナル [CDJournal].

1. "Sanshawā [saihatsu]" サンシャワー [再発] [SUNSHOWER [reissue]].
2. "Gurei Sukaizu～Sanshawā [2CD] [saihatsu]" グレイ・スカイズ～サンシャワー [2CD] [再発] [Grey Skies – SUNSHOWER [2CD] [reissue]].
3. "SUNSHOWER [kami jaketto shiyō] [gentei]" SUNSHOWER [紙ジャケット仕様] [限定] [SUNSHOWER [paper sleeve] [limited]].
4. "SUNSHOWER [Blu-spec CD]" [SUNSHOWER [Blu-spec CD]].
5. ""Oto no Būke" Ōnuki Taeko Kavāshū" 「音のブーケ」大貫妙子カヴァー集 [Oto no Bouquet —Taeko Onuki Cover Collection—].
6. "Summerin'".
7. "Ōnuki Taeko Toribyūto Arubamu～Tribute to Taeko Onuki～ [Dejipakku Shiyō] [2CD]" 大貫妙子トリビュート・アルバム～Tribute to Taeko Onuki～ [デジパック仕様] [2CD] [Ohnuki Taeko Tribute Album —Tribute To Taeko Ohnuki— [digipack] [2CD]].
8. "unjour".

- Anon.[d] (n.d.). Erika.（西恵利香）cover Album 「unjour」 [Erika. (Rika Nishie) cover Album unjour]. shining.shop-pro.jp (in Japanese). シャイニングウィル [Shining-will].
- Blistein, Jon (May 2, 2019). "City Pop: Why Does the Soundtrack to Tokyo's Tech Boom Still Resonate?". Rolling Stone. Penske Business Media.
- Gölz, Yannik (n.d.). "Ciry Pop - der Soundtrack zum japanischen Wirtschaftswunder" [City Pop - The Soundtrack to The Japanese Economic Miracle]. laut.de (in German).
- Green, Laurence (February 23, 2018). "Taeko Ohnuki – Sunshower [*The* best Japanese City Pop album]". animewondering.
- St. Michel, Patrick (December 22, 2017). "Taeko Onuki of Sugar Babe on Her Journey in Japanese Music". Red Bull Music Academy Daily. Red Bull Music Academy.
- Time (Is) (February 6, 2018). "Review: Taeko Onuki - Sunshower". Sputnikmusic.
- Kaneko, Atsutake (July 1, 2016). "Ōnuki Taeko ga kataru, nanika o nasu node wanaku mirai e tsunageru to iu jinseikan" 大貫妙子が語る、何かを成すのではなく未来へ繋げるという人生観 [Not Achieving Something, but for the Future, Taeko Ohnuki Talks about Her View of Life]. CINRA.NET (in Japanese). CINRA.
- Kuniyoshi, Seiji (October 3, 2007). SUNSHOWER (CD reissue booklet) (in Japanese). Ohnuki Taeko. PANAM / CROWN. CRCP-20409.
- Ohnuki, Taeko (September 25, 1976). Grey Skies (Taeko Ohnuki album) (LP) (in Japanese). PANAM / CROWN. GW-4023.
- Ohnuki, Taeko (July 5, 1977). SUNSHOWER (LP) (in Japanese). PANAM / CROWN. GW-4029.
- Ohnuki, Taeko (October 3, 2007). SUNSHOWER (CD reissue booklet) (in Japanese). PANAM / CROWN. CRCP-20409.
- Ohnuki, Taeko (August 25, 2015). Tokai / Kusuri wo Takusan 都会 / くすりをたくさん [City / A Lot of Medicine] (7" 45 rpm vinyl) (in Japanese). PANAM / CROWN. CRK-1021.
