= An Insatiable High =

Studio album by Masayoshi Takanaka
- Released: December 1, 1977
- Studio: Larrabee Sound Studios, North Hollywood, California
- Genre: Jazz fusion
- Length: 41:29
- Label: Kitty
- Producer: Masayoshi Takanaka

Masayoshi Takanaka chronology
Takanaka (1977)	An Insatiable High (1977)	Brasilian Skies (1978)

An Insatiable High is the third studio album by Japanese musician, producer and composer Masayoshi Takanaka, released by Kitty Records in 1977. The album features performances from the American R&B and jazz group Tower of Power, and vocal performances from American session musician Jim Gilstrap.

== Track listing ==
Adapted from LP liner notes:

No.	Title	Length
1.	"Sexy Dance"	5:54
2.	"Malibu"	6:15
3.	"An Insatiable High"	10:12
4.	"E.S.P."	4:11
5.	"M5"	4:21
6.	"Sundrops"	5:10
7.	"Good (Bad?) Old Days"	5:26
Total length:		41:29

== Personnel ==
Adapted from LP liner notes:

- Masayoshi Takanaka – guitar, string arrangement (4), composer
- Lee Ritenour – guitar
- Abraham Laboriel – bass guitar (1, 4, 6)
- Chuck Rainey – bass guitar (2, 3, 5, 7)
- Patrice Rushen – keyboards (1–4, 6, 7)
- Jun Fukamachi – keyboards (3, 5), string arrangement (2)
- Harvey Mason – drums (1, 3–6)
- Ed Greene – drums (2, 7)
- Shuichi Murakami – drums (4)
- Motoya Hamaguchi – percussion (1, 3–5)
- Steve Forman – percussion (1, 3–6)
- Paulinho da Costa – percussion (2, 3, 5, 7)
- Elise Krentzel – lyrics (1)
- Roy Alfred – lyrics (4)
- Julia Tillman Waters – backup vocals (1, 4, 6)
- Maxine Willard Waters – backup vocals (1, 4, 6)
- Maxine Anderson – backup vocals (1, 4, 6)
- Jim Gilstrap – backup vocals (4)
- Katz Hoshi – string arrangement (7)

Tower of Power (1, 4, 5)

- Emilio Castillo – tenor saxophone
- Lenny Pickett – tenor saxophone
- Steve Kupka – baritone saxophone
- Greg Adams – trumpet, horn arrangement
- Mic Gillette – trumpet

Additional personnel and production

- Katsuya Yasumuro – executive producer
- Tokio Shibata – production manager
- Bob Stone – recording
- Teruaki Kitagawa – recording, mixing
- Isao Sakai – design
- Masayoshi Sukita – photography
- Hiroshi Tanaka – management
- Naomi Niimura – coordinator
- Olivia Page – coordinator

== See also ==
- 1977 in Japanese music
