= Natsu Zen Kai =

Studio album by Masayoshi Takanaka
- Released: 10 July 1984
- Recorded: 1984
- Genre: Jazz fusion; funk; pop
- Length: 40:21
- Label: Kitty
- Producer: Masayoshi Takanaka

Masayoshi Takanaka chronology
Can I Sing? (1983)	Natsu Zen Kai (1984)	Traumatic Kyokutotanteyidan (1985)

Natsu Zen Kai (Japanese: 夏・全・開) is the thirteenth studio album by Japanese musician, producer, and composer Masayoshi Takanaka, released by Kitty Records on 10 July 1984.

== Reception ==
The album was reviewed by CDJournal.

== Charts ==
The album reached number 6 on the Oricon chart. It reached number 7 on the Music Labo albums chart, having debuted at that position. It reached number 7 on the Cash Box LPs chart published on 18 August 1984, but no Japanese chart was published the following week.

== Track Listing ==
All lyrics are written by Chris Mosdell; all music is composed by Masayoshi Takanaka.

No.	Title	Length
1.	"ようこそ、夏の王国へ (Welcome to Club Tropicalypso)"	4:02
2.	"Paradizzy"	2:53
3.	"Eyelands"	3:55
4.	"Cuban Heels"	4:24
5.	"大航海時代 (A Letter to the Great Khan)"	5:18
6.	"Dancing to Cat Guitar"	3:57
7.	"Summertime Blues"	4:37
8.	"Return Ace" (instrumental)	4:21
9.	"Neptune" (instrumental)	5:08
10.	"Oyasumi" (instrumental)	1:52

== Personnel ==
Credits and personnel adapted from liner notes.

- Masayoshi Takanaka – guitar (all tracks), OB-8, DMX & DSX synthesizers (1–3, 5, 7, 9), vocals (1–3, 5, 6), arrangements (all tracks except 4)
- Chris Mosdell – rap (1, 6)
- Cindy – vocals (1)
- Mimi Kobayashi – keyboards (1)
- Eve – chorus (2–7)
- Ken Morimura – synthesizer & arrangements (4), keyboards (8, 9)
- Orquesta del Sol – rhythm section & horns (4)
- Yuji Toriyama – synthesizer (8, 10), guitar (10)
- Masayoshi Takanaka – producer
- Tatsuyo Morokaji, Susumu Yamazaki – engineers
- Kinichiro Maeda – mastering
- Studio Champ – design concept
- Shimpai Asai, Kenji Miura – photography
- Choux Suzuki – director, A&R
- Hidenori Taga – executive producer

== See also ==
- 1984 in Japanese music
