= Portillo =

Portillo may refer to:

- Portillo (surname), including a list of people with the surname
- Portillo de Toledo, Spain
- Portillo, Valladolid, Spain
- Portillo, Chile
- Portillo's Restaurants
- Portillo, Adjuntas, Puerto Rico, a barrio of Adjuntas, Puerto Rico
