= Traumatic Kyokutotanteyidan =

1985 album by Masayoshi Takanaka

Studio album by Masayoshi Takanaka
- Released: 20 July 1985
- Recorded: 1985
- Genres: Jazz fusion; funk; pop
- Length: 40:54
- Label: Eastworld
- Producer: Masayoshi Takanaka

Masayoshi Takanaka chronology
| Natsu Zen Kai (1984) | Traumatic Kyokutotanteyidan (1985) | Jungle Jane (1986) |

Traumatic Kyokutotanteyidan (Japanese: TRAUMATIC 極東探偵団 or トラマティック極東探偵団), released in the US as Traumatic, is the fourteenth studio album by Japanese musician, producer, and composer Masayoshi Takanaka, released by Eastworld on 20 July 1985. The album title translates to 'The Traumatic Far East Detective Agency'.

== Reception ==
The album has been reviewed by Billboard and CDJournal.

== Charts ==
The album reached number 6 in the Music Labo albums chart, having debuted at number 7. It appeared in the Cash Box of Japan LPs charts.

== Awards ==
The album won an excellent album award (優秀アルバム賞, yūshū album-shō) at the 27th Japan Record Awards.

== Singles ==
The songs "Nagisa Moderato", "China", "Teaser" and "The Line is Busy", which are included in this album, were released as singles.

=== Nagisa Moderato ===
The single Nagisa Moderato (渚・モデラート) reached number 30 on the Oricon Singles Chart. In 2011, this song came third in a popularity poll of Takanaka's songs.

=== China ===
The single China has been reviewed by CDJournal.

=== Teaser ===
In the United States, the single Teaser reached number 87 in the Billboard Hot Black Singles chart, and number 82 in the Cash Box Black Contemporary Singles chart. The song was placed in rotation in that country. The single has been reviewed by Billboard and Cash Box.

=== The Line is Busy ===
The single The Line is Busy has been reviewed by Billboard. Cash Box said this was a record to watch. The song was placed in rotation in the United States. Personnel include Tom Browne.

== Track listing ==
All music is composed by Masayoshi Takanaka.

| No. | Title | Lyrics | Length |
|---|---|---|---|
| 1. | "Teaser" | Jeff Brown | 4:52 |
| 2. | "China" | Brown | 5:12 |
| 3. | "The Line Is Busy" | | 5:03 |
| 4. | "Nagisa-Moderato" (渚・モデラート) | Lilika Shinzato of Eve | 4:40 |
| 5. | "Traumatic" | | 4:22 |
| 6. | "Jackie's Trail" | Brown | 4:26 |
| 7. | "Chase" | | 4:13 |
| 8. | "Struttin' on Broadway" | Brown | 3:00 |
| 9. | "Lagoon Music" | | 4:57 |

== Personnel ==
Credits and personnel adapted from liner notes.

- Masayoshi Takanaka – electric and acoustic guitars, programming, arrangements
- Hiroshi Shinkawa – electric and acoustic pianos, synthesizers, arrangements
- Rickie C. Mangum, Billy T. Scott – backing vocals, rap
- Eve, Fumiko Hiratsuka, Jamillah Muhammed, Eunice Peterson, Robyn Sansone – backing vocals
- Jun Aoyama – additional toms on "Teaser"
- Yumi Matsutoya, Akiko Yano – vocals on "China"
- Motoya Hamaguchi, Nobu Saito – percussion on "China," "Nagisa-Moderato" and "Jackie's Trail"
- Toshihiro Nakanishi – strings on "China" and "Nagisa-Moderato"
- Tom Browne – trumpet on "The Line Is Busy"
- Kyoko Kashida – narrator on "Traumatic"
- Jake H. Concepcion – saxophone on "Traumatic"
- Masayoshi Takanaka – producer
- Ken Sugaya – director
- Toshio Tamakawa – recording
- Juri Kawai, Moira Marquis, Andrew Spiegelman, Kinya Takayama, Shinichi Yano – assistant engineers
- Ron Saint Germain – mixing
- Kohshi Yamagishi – mastering
- Yoshio Okabe – artist manager
- Kenichi Nomura, Noriyuki Ohta – A&R coordinators
- Goh Hotoda – NYC production coordinator
- Kei Ishizaka – executive producer

== See also ==
- 1985 in Japanese music
