= Saudade (Masayoshi Takanaka album) =

Studio album by Masayoshi Takanaka
- Released: 10 September 1982
- Recorded: 1982
- Genre: Jazz fusion; funk; pop
- Length: 43:55
- Label: Kitty
- Producer: Narada Michael Walden

Masayoshi Takanaka chronology
Alone (1981)	Saudade (1982)	Can I Sing? (1983)

Saudade is the eleventh studio album by Japanese musician, producer, and composer Masayoshi Takanaka, released by Kitty Records on 10 September 1982.. Saudade was the first Japanese instrumental album to hit number one on the Oricon charts in the same year it released in. Takanaka celebrated the 40th anniversary of the release of the album with a National Japanese tour in September 2022.

== Reception ==
Professional ratings
Review scores
Source	Rating
Music Week	2/3 stars

The album was praised by the reviewer in Music Week. The album was given a two star rating, which meant that the reviewer predicted the album would achieve a "fair" level of sales.

== Charts ==
The album reached number 1 on the Oricon charts. The album reached number 2 in the Music Labo albums chart, having debuted at number 15. It was number 2 in the Cash Box of Japan LPs chart published on 23 October 1982, but no Japanese chart was published in either the preceding or following weeks.

== 40th anniversary tour ==
In 2022, Takanaka did a tour, called "Takanaka Super Live 2022 Saudade", to commemorate the 40th anniversary of Saudade.

== Track listing ==
All tracks are written by Masayoshi Takanaka, except where noted.

1. A Fair Wind – 4:32
2. Saudade – 3:41
3. Eona – 5:36
4. Breakin' Loose – 4:46
5. Ride 'em High – 3:52
6. Chill Me Out (lyrics by Narada Michael Walden) – 4:37
7. New York Strut – 5:40
8. The Forest of My Heart (Walden) – 4:54
9. Manifestation (Walden) – 6:10

== Personnel ==
Credits and personnel adapted from liner notes.

- Masayoshi Takanaka – guitar, vocals, arrangements
- Joaquin Liévano – guitar
- Frank Martin – keyboards, vocals
- T. M. Stevens – bass, vocals
- Narada Michael Walden – drums, arrangements
- Sheila E. – percussion
- Randy Jackson, Leslie Ann Jones, Kelly Kool, Wanda Walden – vocals
- Andy Narell – steel pans on "Saudade"
- Patrick Cowley – synthesizer on "Chill Me Out"
- Narada Michael Walden – producer
- Masayoshi Takanaka – associate producer
- Susan Brill, Kazuo Munakata – project coordination
- Dave Frazer – basic track engineer
- Leslie Ann Jones – overdub engineer, remix
- Elisa Romano – assistant engineer
- Koichi Chigi – design
- Masayoshi Sukita – photography
- Choux Suzuki – artist management, direction
- Greg DiGiovine – project supervision
- Hidenori Taga – executive producer

== See also ==
- 1982 in Japanese music
