= List of Lupin III soundtracks =

List of Lupin III soundtracks discography

This list of Lupin the Third soundtracks contains collections of music from anime productions in the Lupin the Third franchise. The series follows the globetrotting criminal capers of gentleman thief Lupin III and his gang.

A large number of albums covering the Lupin III franchise have been released by publishers Columbia Music Entertainment and VAP. At least one soundtrack album has been released for each animated series, movie, special, and OVA, in addition to compilation and remix albums. Bandleader Yuji Ohno has composed most of the series' music, beginning with the second television series in 1977. Lupin III soundtracks typically fall under the genre of jazz.

== First television series ==
The music for the first series was created by Takeo Yamashita, with vocal performances on tracks by Charlie Kosei.

Two singles were released on December 10, 1971, and January 20, 1972.

The Original BGM Collection was released as an LP by Nippon Columbia on March 25, 1980. This was later reissued on CD on March 14, 2007, for the 40th anniversary of the original Manga.

Music from the series was also released on 2 albums, Lupin III 71' Me Tracks published by VAP on February 21, 1999 and Lupin III The 1st Series Music Anthology, published by Nippon Columbia on March 21, 2003. The songs and background music on both albums were using tapes that had sound effects layered on-top of the music. Due to a loss of the original master tape for the background music, the music from the series was recreated by Takeo Yamashita and released as Rebirth From '71 Series on January 21, 2003.

== Second television series ==
A trio of albums were released containing music from the second TV series.

=== Lupin III Original Soundtrack ===
Lupin III Original Soundtrack

Soundtrack album by You & The Explosion Band, Sandra Hohn, Tommy Snyder/You & The Explosion Band
- Released: 1978 (Vinyl), October 21, 1994 (CD)
- Recorded: Akasaka Music Studio and Sound City
- Length: 41:28
- Label: Columbia

In 1978, Columbia released a vinyl album titled Lupin III Original Soundtrack, which contained several pieces from the second TV series. Interspersed between tracks are small selections of dialogue from the show. It was later re-released to CD in 1994.

==== LP ====
All tracks written and arranged by Yuji Ohno; except where noted.

Side A

1. "Theme From Lupin III" – 3:48
2. "Silhouette" – 4:24
3. "I Miss You Babe (Yes, I Do)" (Yoko Narahashi, Yuji Ohno) – 4:34
4. "Red Roses For The Killer" – 4:48
5. "Goodnight Moon-Shadow" – 2:58

Side B

1. "Dangerous Zone" – 4:10
2. "Sunset Flight" – 2:10
3. "Magnum Dance ~ Lonely For The Road" – 8:09
4. "Lovin' You (Lucky)" (Yoko Narahashi, Yuji Ohno) – 3:20
5. "Love Theme" – 3:02

==== CD ====
1. "Theme From Lupin III" – 3:48
2. "Silhouette" – 4:24
3. "I Miss You Babe (Yes, I Do)" – 4:34
4. "Red Roses For The Killer" – 4:48
5. "Goodnight Moon-Shadow" – 2:58
6. "Dangerous Zone" – 4:10
7. "Sunset Flight" – 2:10
8. "Magnum Dance ~ Lonely For The Road" – 8:09
9. "Lovin' You (Lucky)" – 3:20
10. "Love Theme" – 3:02

==== Personnel ====
- Noriko Iida, Seiji Suzuki, Yuji Ohno – Producer
- Akira Yoshikawa, Yasuji Takahashi, Yoshimitsu Takahashi – Co-Producer
- Atsushi Kitamura, Mikio Shimizu – Director
- Tomiharu Iyobe – Engineer
- Vocals – Tommy Snyder – Vocals ("Lovin' You (Lucky)")
- Sandi A. Hohn – Vocals ("I Miss You Babe, (Yes I Do)")
- Akira Okazawa, Kenji Takamizu – Bass
- Seiji Tanaka, Yasushi Ichihara – Drums
- Larry Sunaga – Percussion
- Keiko Yamakawa – Harp
- Minoru Kuribayashi, Yuji Ohno – Keyboards
- Minoru Soma, Takeshi Shinohara, Yukio Eto – Flute
- Jake H. Concepcion, Tadataka Harada, Takeru Muraoka – Saxophone
- Katsuyuki Sugimoto, Kazuo Usui, Shigeharu Mukai, Tadataka Fukui – Trombone
- Hitoshi Kazuhara, Kenichi Sano, Koji Hadori*, Kunitoshi Shinohara, Masanobu Arao – Trumpet

=== Lupin III Original Soundtrack 2 ===
Lupin III Original Soundtrack 2

Soundtrack album by Yuji Ohno, Sandra Hohn, Tommy Snyder/You & The Explosion Band
- Released: 1978 (Vinyl), October 21, 1994 (CD)
- Recorded: Recorded at Sound City, Teichiku Studio
- Length: 39:46
- Label: Columbia

In 1978, Columbia released a vinyl album titled Lupin III Original Soundtrack 2, which contained several pieces from the second TV series as well as The Mystery of Mamo. It was later re-released to CD in 1994.

==== LP ====
All tracks arranged and composed by Yuji Ohno.

Side A

1. "Lupin III '79" – 3:14
2. "Tornado" – 2:14
3. "Love In Sao Paulo" – 3:34
4. "Sphynx" – 5:34
5. "Spiral Flight ~ Saint Germant a La Nuit Tombante" – 5:23

Side B

1. "Wild Crisis" – 2:25
2. "The Way To The Oasis" – 4:37
3. "Super Hero" – 2:58
4. "Zantetsuken" – 2:55
5. "Funny Walk In Old Fashion" – 3:16
6. "Love Squall" – 3:31

==== CD ====
All tracks arranged and composed by Yuji Ohno.

1. "Lupin III '79" – 3:14
2. "Tornado" – 2:14
3. "Love In Sao Paulo" – 3:34
4. "Sphynx" – 5:34
5. "Spiral Flight ~ Saint Germant a La Nuit Tombante" – 5:23
6. "Wild Crisis" – 2:25
7. "The Way To The Oasis" – 4:37
8. "Super Hero" – 2:58
9. "Zantetsuken" – 2:55
10. "Funny Walk In Old Fashion" – 3:16
11. "Love Squall" – 3:31

==== Personnel ====
- Noriko Iida, Yuji Ohno – Producer
- Yuji Ohno – Arrangements, Composer
- Tomiharu Iyobe – Recording, Mixing
- Yujiro Kasai – Cutting
- Fumihiko Kazama – Accordion
- Michio Nagaoka – Bass
- Makiko Hirayama – Biwa
- Kayoko Ishu Group – Chorus
- Takeru Muraoka – Clarinet
- Yuichi Togashiki – Drums
- Akira Fujiyama, Nozomi Nakatani, Shyozo Nakagawa – Flute
- Tsunehide Matsuki – Guitar
- Minoru Kuribayashi – Hammond Organ
- Keiko Yamakawa – Harp
- Yuji Ohno – Keyboards
- Pepe Anai – Percussion
- Kiyoshi Saito, Takeru Muraoka – Saxophone
- Koso Sakata – Shakuhachi
- Suzuki Group – Strings
- Eiji Arai – Trombone
- Fumio Shiroyama, Shin Kazuhara*, Yoshihiro Nagakawa, Yoshikazu Kishi – Trumpet
- Hiromitsu Katada – Tsuzumi
- Sandra Hohn – Vocals ("Love Squall")
- Tommy Snyder – Vocals ("Super Hero")

=== Lupin III Original Soundtrack 3 ===
Lupin III Original Soundtrack 3

Soundtrack album by Yuji Ohno, Noboru Kimura, Bobbi/You & The Explosion Band
- Released: December 10, 1979 (Vinyl), November 21, 1994 (CD)
- Recorded: Sound Inn
- Length: 41:16
- Label: Columbia

In 1979, Columbia released a vinyl album titled Lupin III Original Soundtrack 3, which contained several pieces from the second TV series as well as The Castle of Cagliostro. It was later re-released to CD in 1994.

==== LP ====
All tracks arranged and composed by Yuji Ohno.

Side A

1. "Lupin III '80" – 3:40
2. "You Are Like Breeze" – 2:48
3. "Vicious Glory" – 2:27
4. "Love Is Everything" – 3:58
5. "C-Dag – Toward The Patrol Line" – 3:04
6. "A Monmartre" – 5:06

Side B

1. "Mysterious Journey" – 3:11
2. "Passart" – 3:47
3. "Fire Treasure" – 3:07
4. "Tropical Wave" – 2:47
5. "Leave You" – 4:20
6. "Samba Temperado – C-Dag" – 2:55

==== CD ====
All tracks arranged and composed by Yuji Ohno.

1. "Lupin III '80" – 3:40
2. "You Are Like Breeze" – 2:48
3. "Vicious Glory" – 2:27
4. "Love Is Everything" – 3:58
5. "C-Dag – Toward The Patrol Line" – 3:04
6. "A Monmartre" – 5:06
7. "Mysterious Journey" – 3:11
8. "Passart" – 3:47
9. "Fire Treasure" – 3:07
10. "Tropical Wave" – 2:47
11. "Leave You" – 4:20
12. "Samba Temperado – C-Dag" – 2:55

==== Personnel ====
- Yuji Ohno – Arrangements, Composer, Producer
- Noriko Iida – Executive Producer
- Atsushi Kitamura, Norikazu Yoshimura – Director
- Tomiharu Iyobe – Recording, Mixing
- Yujiro Kasai – Cutting
- Akira Okazawa – Bass
- Yasushi Ichihara – Drums
- Kiyoshi Hagiya, Takao Naoi – Guitar
- Yuji Ohno – Keyboards
- Takahito Sunaga – Percussion

== Lupin the Third: The Woman Called Fujiko Mine Original Soundtrack ==
Lupin the Third: The Woman Called Fujiko Mine Original Soundtrack

Soundtrack album by Naruyoshi Kikuchi, Pepe Tormento Azcarar, Ichiko Hashimoto, Masako Hayashi, Takashi Matsudaira, Hiroki Hiroko, Sara Yoshida, Masayasu Tzboguchi, NIKIIE
- Released: December 19, 2012
- Label: Nippon Columbia

The official soundtrack of Lupin the Third: The Woman Called Fujiko Mine was released by Nippon Columbia on December 19, 2012, and features 42-tracks. It was released on US iTunes on January 29, 2013.

=== Track listing ===
All tracks written and arranged by Naruyoshi Kikuchi.

No.	Title	Length
1.	"Scar" (聖痕)
2.	"New Wuthering Heights" (新・嵐が丘)
3.	"The Woman Called Fujiko – 1" (峰不二子という女-1)
4.	"Despair and Pleasure" (絶望と享楽)
5.	"Temptation" (誘惑)
6.	"Creep" (潜行)
7.	"The Man Called Lupin – 1" (ルパン三世という男-1)
8.	"The Samurai Called Goemom – 1" (石川五エ門という男-1)
9.	"Zantetsu Sword – 1" (斬鉄の剣-1)
10.	"Oblivion" (忘却)
11.	"Fraulein Eule 1 – Ritual" (フロイライン・オイレ1-儀式)
12.	"Case Report I – Distraction" (症例I-錯乱)
13.	"The Guy Called Jigen – 1" (次元大介という男-1)
14.	"Indigo Blue – 1" (インディゴ・ブルー1)
15.	"Tosca, From Act 1 "Ed io venivo a lui tutta dogliosa"" (歌劇「トスカ」第一幕より「悲しみに暮れて知らせに来たのに」)
16.	"Pleasure Principle" (快楽原理)
17.	"Fraulein Eule 2 – Amnesiac" (フロイライン・オイレ2-喪失)
18.	"The Guy Called Jigen – 2" (次元大介という男-2)
19.	"The Woman Called Fujiko – 2" (峰不二子という女-2)
20.	"Case Report II – Disassociation" (症例II-解離)
21.	"Latin From 20,000 Feet Above" (上空20000フィートのラテン)
22.	"Thief Theorem" (泥棒の定理)
23.	"Tattoo Her" (見世物小屋の女)
24.	"Oscar, Beautiful Rose (Invention in a Minor BMW 784)" (美少年オスカー(2声のインベンション第13番 イ短調 BWV 784))
25.	"Fraulein Eule 3 – Spellbound" (フロイライン・オイレ3-呪縛)
26.	"The Man Called Lupin – 2" (ルパン三世という男-2)
27.	"Elegy – 1" (エレジー1)
28.	"Tosca, From Act 2 "Vissi d'arte, vissi d'amore"" (歌劇「トスカ」第二幕よりアリア「歌に生き、恋に生き」)
29.	"Case Report III – Borderline Case" (症例III-境界)
30.	"Hypnotic Beat" (ヒプノティック・ビート)
31.	"The Samurai Called Goemon – 2" (石川五エ門という男-2)
32.	"Zantetsu Sword – 2" (斬鉄の剣-2)
33.	"The Man Called Lupin – 3" (ルパン三世という男-3)
34.	"Bogus Memory" (虚偽記憶)
35.	"Obsession" (オブセッション)
36.	"Owl Man" (梟男)
37.	"Glaucus Park" (グラウコス・パーク)
38.	"The House of Fujiko" (不二子の館)
39.	"Stigmata" (スティグマ)
40.	"Phantasm" (幻影)
41.	"Indigo Blue – 2" (インディゴ・ブルー2)
42.	"Elegy – 2" (エレジー2)
43.	"Duty Friend (TV Size)"

== Films ==
=== Lupin III: The Castle of Cagliostro BGM Soundtrack ===
Lupin III: The Castle of Cagliostro BGM Soundtrack

Soundtrack album by Yuji Ohno, Bobbi
- Released: November 21, 1994
- Length: 43:56
- Label: Columbia

In 1994, Columbia released a CD containing excerpts from the score of The Castle of Cagliostro, as well as tracks that were composed for but not used in the film.

1. "Toward the Patrol Line (Variation)" – 2:52
2. "Fire Treasure (Variation 1)" – 1:51
3. "Sneakin'" – 3:24
4. "Fire Treasure (Variation 2)" – 2:12
5. "A Riddle of Underground Waterworks" – 1:51
6. "Fire Treasure (Variation 3)" – 2:58
7. "Strange Sensation" – 3:25
8. "Fire Treasure" – 3:07
9. "You Are Like Breeze (Variation)" – 2:59
10. "Wedding" – 1:50
11. "In the Lun-Lun Feeling" – 1:37
12. "Tropical Wave (Variation)" – 3:20
13. "The Plot of the Earl" – 1:30
14. "Mystery Zone" – 1:41
15. "Lone Wolf" – 2:55
16. "Uncanny Night" – 2:38
17. "Mysterious Journey (Variation)" – 3:59

=== Lupin vs The Clone ===
Also known as The Mystery of Mamo outside Japan, Lupin vs The Clone was the first Lupin film to be released. Lupin vs The Clone Music File was released by Columbia under the "Lupin III Chronicle" brand on November 19, 2003.

No.	Title	Length
1.	Untitled (生きていたルパン <映画BGM-M-1>)
2.	Untitled (ルパン三世'79<TVサイズ/オープニング80">)
3.	Untitled (賢者の石<映画BGM-M-18>)
4.	Untitled (「銭形マーチ」ヴァリエーション<映画BGM-M-5T2>)
5.	Untitled (「スーパーヒーロー」ヴァリエーション<映画BGM-M-7>)
6.	Untitled (不二子<映画BGM-M-8>)
7.	Untitled (ルパン三世 愛のテーマ<映画BGM-M-9>)
8.	Untitled (ラヴ・スコール<映画BGM-M-10>)
9.	Untitled (「ルパン音頭」ヴァリエーション<映画BGM-ルパン音頭B>)
10.	Untitled (死への手引き<映画BGM-M-13T2>)
11.	Untitled (全力疾走<映画BGM-M-15T2>)
12.	Untitled (「ルパン三世のテーマ」ヴァリエーション<映画BGM-M-19T2>)
13.	Untitled (デンジャラス・ゾーン DANGEROUS ZONE<台詞無し>)
14.	Untitled (TRAP IN THE DARK 2<ルパン三世1977-M18>)
15.	Untitled (確執<映画BGM-M-4>)
16.	Untitled (燃える水<映画BGM-M-24>)
17.	Untitled (荒野は果てしなく<映画BGM-M-23Slow>)
18.	Untitled (凌辱<映画BGM-M-4短いもの>)
19.	Untitled (よれよれルパン<映画BGM-M-100T2>)
20.	Untitled (コロシアム<映画BGM-M-29T5>)
21.	Untitled (悪の足跡<映画BGM-M-29AT2>)
22.	Untitled (迷い道<映画BGM-M-101B>)
23.	Untitled (黒い陰謀 WILD CRISIS<短縮版>)
24.	Untitled (わが身は永遠に part1<映画BGM-ハープOnlyT2>)
25.	Untitled (分析される賢者の石<映画BGM-M-37>)
26.	Untitled (マモーの偏愛<映画BGM-M-43>)
27.	Untitled (「銭形マーチ」ヴァリエーション<映画BGM-M-44T2>)
28.	Untitled (「銭形マーチ」ヴァリエーション<映画BGM-マーチD>)
29.	Untitled (「銭形マーチ」ヴァリエーション<映画BGM-M-44B>)
30.	Untitled (わが身は永遠に part4<映画BGM-M-53>)
31.	Untitled (わが身は永遠に part2<映画BGM-M-55>)
32.	Untitled (奪還へ<映画BGM-M-57T2>)
33.	Untitled (わが身は永遠に part5<映画BGM-M-59ハープDB>)
34.	Untitled (ワイルド・クライシス<映画BGM-M-30T3>)
35.	Untitled (大疾走<映画BGM-M-61>)
36.	Untitled (光線<映画BGM-M-63T2>)
37.	Untitled (燃えるマモー<映画BGM-シンセ&ソリーナ>)
38.	Untitled (マモーの断末魔<映画BGM-M-23>)
39.	Untitled (私がオリジナルだ<映画BGM-M-66T2>)
40.	Untitled (道は魔の世界へ<映画BGM-M-67T3>)
41.	Untitled (ルパン三世のテーマ<映画BGM-M-69T3>)
42.	Untitled (ルパン音頭・バリエーション<映画BGM-ルパン音頭>)
43.	Untitled (わが身は永遠に part3<映画BGM-M-34>)
44.	Untitled (夢とたわむれて(ラヴ・スコール)<映画BGM-M-27>)
45.	Untitled (トルネイド(次元大介のテーマ)<映画BGM-M-104>)
46.	Untitled (ユートピア<映画BGM-M-105FI>)
47.	Untitled (ホップ・ステップ・スキップ・アベニュー<映画BGM-M-102>)
48.	Untitled (砂漠に夕焼け<映画BGM-M-21>)
49.	Untitled (オアシスへ<映画BGM-M-106B>)

=== Castle of Cagliostro Music File ===
Castle of Cagliostro Music File was released on CD by Columbia Music Entertainment on May 21, 2003. The catalog number is COCX-32227.The album contains additional tracks that were recorded during production but never used.

No.	Title	Length
1.	Untitled (プロローグ / 新ルパン三世BGM / BOX PartII・未収録TV-BGM No. 88)
2.	Untitled (ジャンプ! / M-15 / 映画用編集版 / 初収録)
3.	Untitled (日の当たる大通りで / 新ルパン三世BGM / BGMコレクションVol.1)
4.	Untitled (炎のたからもの＜OP映画サイズ＞ 歌：ボビー / − / 初収録)
5.	Untitled (ルンルン気分で / M-11 / カリオストロの城BGM集)
6.	Untitled (ルパン三世'80＜カーチェイス1＞ / 映画用編集版 / 初収録)
7.	Untitled (ルパン三世'80＜カーチェイス2＞ / 映画用編集版 / 初収録)
8.	Untitled (悪の栄光 / ーー / ルパン三世・3)
9.	Untitled (クラリスとの出逢い / 新ルパン三世BGM / 初収録)
10.	Untitled (古城へ / 新ルパン三世BGM / 初収録)
11.	Untitled (摩訶不思議 / M-6 / カリオストロの城BGM集)
12.	Untitled (伯爵登場 / 新ルパン三世BGM / BOX PartII・未収録TV-BGM No. 80)
13.	Untitled (レストランの男〜スパゲッティ争奪戦 / 新ルパン三世BGM / 初収録)
14.	Untitled (団体様のおつきだァ〜新ルパン三世BGM / BOX PartII・未収録TV-BGM No. 43)
15.	Untitled (不二子の探索 / 新ルパン三世BGM / 初収録)
16.	Untitled (五エ門登場 / 新ルパン三世BGM / 初収録)
17.	Untitled (銭形警部到着 / 新ルパン三世BGM / 初収録)
18.	Untitled (作戦タイム / Mー19 / BOX PartII ・カリオストロの城未収録BGM No. 17)
19.	Untitled (ルパ銭作戦 / Bridge-3 / BOX PartII ・カリオストロの城未収録BGM No. 17)
20.	Untitled (忍び足 / M-3 / カリオストロの城BGM集)
21.	Untitled (消えたルパン / Bridge-5 / 初収録)
22.	Untitled (ミステリー・ゾーン / M-20 / カリオストロの城BGM集)
23.	Untitled (屋根からジャンプ / Mー15 / 映画用編集版 / 初収録)
24.	Untitled (クラリスの部屋へ / M-6Bridge / BOX PartII ・カリ城未収録BGM No. 21)
25.	Untitled (炎のたからものバリエーションIII / カリオストロの城Ob / カリオストロの城BGM集)
26.	Untitled (クラリスの危機 / 新ルパン三世BGM / BOX PartII ・未収録TV-BGM No. 97)
27.	Untitled (恐怖の一夜 / M-21(M-4) / カリオストロの城BGM集)
28.	Untitled (バラとクラリス(「炎のたからもの」アレンジ曲) / M-16テーマVib,Fl / 初収録)
29.	Untitled (地下牢の人影 / 新ルパン三世BGM / 初収録)
30.	Untitled (伯爵の陰謀 / Mー1 / カリオストロの城BGM集)
31.	Untitled (非常線突破 バリエーション / Mー15 / カリオストロの城BGM集)
32.	Untitled (ゴート札の歴史 / M-2 / 初収録曲)
33.	Untitled (ルパンを探せ / M-22 / BOX PartII カリオストロの城未収録BGM No. 19)
34.	Untitled (サンバ・テンペラード / ルパン三世・3)
35.	Untitled (指輪を取るクラリス / 新ルパン三世BGM / 初収録)
36.	Untitled (出動はない... / 映画『ルパン三世』BGM / BOX PartII 映画「ルパン三世」未収録BGM#5)
37.	Untitled (大食いルパン / 新ルパン三世BGM / 初収録)
38.	Untitled (ルパンの回想 / 新ルパン三世BGM / 初収録)
39.	Untitled (ウェディング / パストラーレ ヘ長調 BWV590 第3楽章 / カリオストロの城BGM集)
40.	Untitled (異義アリ!〜ルパンの囁き〜指輪奪取〜司祭の正体 / 新ルパン三世BGM / 初収録)
41.	Untitled (ルパン三世80 / 予告用テーマ / BOX PartII ・ルパン三世80（予告用テーマ2）)
42.	Untitled (ニセ札工房への突入 / 新ルパン三世BGM / 初収録)
43.	Untitled (炎のたからもの・アレンジ曲 / カリオストロの城 / BOX Part IIカリオストロの城未収録BGM No. 7)
44.	Untitled (今宵の斬鉄剣は一味ちがうぞ / 新ルパン三世BGM / 初収録)
45.	Untitled (哀愁の一匹狼 / M-5 / カリオストロの城BGM集)
46.	Untitled (時計塔の取り引き / 新ルパン三世BGM / 初収録)
47.	Untitled (ルパン落下 / 新ルパン三世BGM / 初収録)
48.	Untitled (クラリスを救え! / 新ルパン三世BGM / 初収録)
49.	Untitled (C-DAG / 映画用編集版 / 初収録)
50.	Untitled (ミステリアス・ジャーニー / − / ルパン三世・3)
51.	Untitled (炎のたからもの バリエーションIII / カリオストロの城Ob ＊映画使用編集 / 初収録)
52.	Untitled (炎のたからもの＜ED映画サイズ＞ 歌：ボビー / − / 初収録)
53.	"M-15 Bridge"
54.	"M-2Bridge"
55.	"M-5Vl"
56.	"M-4"
57.	"Bridge-1"
58.	"Bridge-2T4"
59.	"M-12'"
60.	"Hamm.Org A"
61.	"Hamm.Org B"
62.	"M-17BT2"
63.	"Jump! ME T1"
64.	"Jump! ME T2"
65.	"M-16オーバーハイム,chamb"

=== Farewell to Nostradamus ===
The soundtrack for the film Farewell to Nostradamus was released on CD by VAP on July 1, 1995. The catalog number is VPCG-84254.

No.	Title	Length
1.	"Theme from Lupin III '89"
2.	"Zenigata's Power Game" (銭形体力勝負)
3.	"First Class Contact" (ファースト・クラス・コンタクト)
4.	"Highjack" (ハイ・ジャック)
5.	"High Tech Tower, Earth Building" (ハイラクタワー・アースビル)
6.	"Aim for the Vault" (狙うは金庫室)
7.	"Prediction Execution Unit" (予言実行部隊)
8.	"Sky Gate" (スカイゲート)
9.	"At Execution Island" (処刑島にて)
10.	"Philip's Memories" (フィリップの形見)
11.	"Boy Sergio" (少年セルジオ)
12.	"Warming... It Lifts" (あたためて・・・あげる。)
13.	"If You Want" (イフ・ユー・ウォント)
14.	"Chris' Intrigue" (クリスの企み)
15.	"Tania's Disappearance" (ターニャ消失)
16.	"Prediction for the End of the Century" (世紀末大予言)
17.	"Move Out" (行動開始)
18.	"Disappearance Ground 1000M" (潜入地上1000M)
19.	"The Women Now" (女たちは今)
20.	"Aim for the Top" (狙物は天辺)
21.	"Genocide Chute" (ジェノサイド・シュート)
22.	"Julia" (ジュリア)
23.	"Chaser" (チェイサー)
24.	"Discouraged Inspector" (警部、意気消沈)
25.	"Eye Spell" (瞳の呪文)
26.	"Leslie's Miscalculation" (ライズソの誤算)
27.	"High Tech Tower Falls Apart" (崩れゆくハイテクの塔)
28.	"Welcome to the Playroom" (プレイルームへようこそ)
29.	"Linear Bathtub Coaster" (リニア・バスタブ・コースター)
30.	"After the Smoke Cleared" (煙は空を焦がすまで)
31.	"Continuation of Love" (愛のつづき 歌：坂上伊織)

=== Dead or Alive ===
The soundtrack for Dead or Alive was released on July 1, 1996, by VAP. The catalog number is VPCG-84605.

No.	Title	Length
1.	"Theme from Lupin III '96" (THEME FROM LUPIN III〈'96バージョン〉)
2.	"Opening" (オープニング)
3.	"Secret of the Drifting Island" (漂流島の秘密をあばけ)
4.	"Escape and Escape" (逃げろや逃げろ)
5.	"The Man Called "The Headhunter General"" ("首飾り将軍"と呼ばれる男)
6.	"Soldier Fujiko's Appearance!" (戦士不二子、登場！)
7.	"Secret Police Crisis" (国家秘密警察クライシス)
8.	"Advertising Balloon Begins the Plan" (アドバルーンで作戦開始！)
9.	"Beautiful, Mysterious Princess Emrra!" (神秘の美姫エメラ)
10.	"Emera Gets It!" (エメラはいただいた！)
11.	"Cornered Lupin" (追いつめられるルパンたち)
12.	"Beautiful, Dangerous Oleander" (美しく危険なオーリエンダー)
13.	"Hard Fighting Man Zenigata!" (男・銭形、奮戦す！)
14.	"Late Night on the Streets of Zufu" (ズフの街の夜は更けて)
15.	"Side Street of Yabaize" (裏通りはヤバイぜ)
16.	"Ole's Fate Sways" (運命に揺れるオーリ)
17.	"Dictator's Evil Influence Falls on Oleander?" (独裁者の魔手に夾竹桃は散るか？)
18.	"Resistance Punishing" (レジスタント・パニッシュ)
19.	"Pay Attention to the Nano Machine!" (ナノマシンに気をつけろ！)
20.	"Who Wins!? Lupin and the General" (どっちが勝つか!?ルパンと将軍)
21.	"Golden Battle" (黄金の大決戦)
22.	"Sweet Trap Damage (Media youth)" (Damageの甘い罠（media youth）)
