= Seychelles (album) =

Studio album by Masayoshi Takanaka
- Released: July 1, 1976
- Recorded: 1976
- Studios: Polydor Studio, Tokyo
- Genres: Jazz fusion, city pop, jazz-funk
- Length: 40:21
- Label: Kitty Records
- Producer: Masayoshi Takanaka

Masayoshi Takanaka chronology
Seychelles (1976)	Takanaka (1977)

Seychelles is the debut studio album by Japanese musician, producer and composer Masayoshi Takanaka, released by Kitty Records in July 1976. The album's initial release was distributed on cassette tape, and was re-released as a CD in 1984. The album is named after the Seychelles islands in the Indian Ocean.

== Reception ==
According to The Japan Times, Takanaka's debut album Seychelles "helped pioneer Japan's rock-fusion scene". The record's tracks are characterized by melodic guitar solos with a slight tropical vibe.

== Track listing ==
All music is composed by Masayoshi Takanaka.

Side A
No.	Title	Lyrics	Length
1.	"Oh! Tengo Suerte"	Yukihiro Takahashi	4:12
2.	"Tokyo Reggie" (トーキョー レギー)	Yukihiro Takahashi	4:20
3.	"Shinkirō no Shima e" (蜃気楼の島へ; To the Mirage Island)		3:38
4.	"Akogare no Sēsheru Shotō" (憧れのセーシェル諸島; Dreaming of the Seychelles Islands)		6:08

Side B
No.	Title	Lyrics	Length
5.	"Funkee Mah-Chan"		5:02
6.	"Sayonara...... Fuji-san" (サヨナラ...... Fuji さん)	Yukihiro Takahashi	4:28
7.	"Bādoairando Kyūkō" (バードアイランド急行; Bird Island Express)		3:42
8.	"Tropic Birds"		8:50
Total length:			40:21

== Personnel ==
Credits and personnel adapted from liner notes

- Masayoshi Takanaka – producer, composer, arranger, guitar, percussion, lead vocals
- Yukihiro Takahashi – lyrics (tracks 1, 2, 6)
- Tsugutoshi Gotō – bass
- Yosui Inoue – chorus
- Tatsuo Hayashi – drums, percussion
- Akio Itoh – engineer
- Susumu Ohno – engineer
- Yasunori Kitajima – engineer
- Atsuya Yasumuro – executive producer
- Hiroshi Imai – keyboards
- Tan Tan – lead vocals, chorus
- Motoya Hamaguchi – percussion
- Nobuo Saitoh – percussion
- Yasuo Azuma – photography
- Jake H. Concepcion – saxophone

== Charts ==
Chart performance for Seychelles
Chart (2026)	Peak position
US Top Contemporary Jazz Albums (Billboard)	11

== Release history ==
Release history for Seychelles
Region	Date	Formats	Label	Ref.
Japan	July 1976	Cassette	Kitty Records	
Japan	July 1984	CD	Kitty Records	
Japan	May 25, 1995	CD (Remastered)	Universal Music Japan	
Japan	March 1, 2006	CD (Limited edition reissue)	Universal Music Japan	
Japan	March 22, 2023	Vinyl (Limited edition reissue)	Universal Music Japan	
Japan	August 7, 2024	Vinyl (Limited edition reissue)	Universal Music Japan	

== See also ==
- 1976 in Japanese music
