= Chantal Portillo =

French writer (born 1957)

Chantal Portillo (born 26 March 1957) is a French writer. She has published several books such as À mains nues (1995, winner of the prix Bleu-Citron), La Femmepluie (1999), Journal d’une vieille sournoise et vilaine, en plus (2002) and Petite Punaise blanche (2005).

She has also written a book on the disappeared Chadian politician Ibni Oumar Mahamat Saleh.
