= Ul de Rico =

Italian artist and author

- Born: February 17, 1944; Udine, Friuli-Venezia Giulia, Italy
- Died: August 3, 2023 (aged 79); Udine, Friuli-Venezia Giulia, Italy
- Website: https://www.uldericoart.it/

Ulderico, Conte de Maniago Gropplero di Troppenburg (February 17, 1944 - August 3, 2023), also known as Count Ul de Rico, was an Italian-born artist and author of illustrated children's books, most notably The Rainbow Goblins (1978) and its sequel The White Goblin (1996).

Count Ul de Rico was also a major artistic contributor to the children's fantasy film The NeverEnding Story, based on the book of the same name by Michael Ende.

== Biography ==
=== Early life ===
Ul de Rico was born in 1944 in Udine, Italy. He lived in Munich for many years, studying at the Munich Academy. He studied painting under Professor Franz Nagel and, under the tutelage of Professor Rudolf Heinrich, received his diploma in stage and costume design.

=== Career ===
The Rainbow Goblins was published in 1977 in Germany, and was translated into English in the same year by Stanley Baron. It is a story of seven goblins, each a different color of the rainbow, who travel through the land catching rainbows and stealing their color. The work was praised for its enchanting oil-on-oak illustrations, which vividly draw the reader into the world of the goblins; and its simple story, which teaches children about color as well as reverence for natural beauty.

In 1980, Ul de Rico wrote and illustrated The Ring of the Nibelung: Wagner's epic drama, an interpretation of the extraordinary 15-hour Richard Wagner opera series Der Ring des Nibelungen. His story was a simplified, truncated version of the full play cycle, which took several creative liberties, the most noticeable of which was the use of the three Norns as narrators throughout the story, rather than merely for Götterdämmerung, as in the original. The oil-on-oak color paintings were all designed similarly: the painting was ringed by the three Norns and their golden rope, and the top half of the painting showed a different scene from the bottom. The top image and bottom image were connected thematically, but not sequentially within the story.

In 1982, he illustrated Richard Adams' short novel The Legend of Te Tuna, a story based on characters from Polynesian mythology. His paintings complemented Adams' poetic verse quite effectively.

Ul de Rico also served as an artist for films: in 1980, he painted the skies and clouds in the film Flash Gordon. He also served as a concept artist for the The NeverEnding Story. His work was similarly vivid and fantastic; the production team based many of their storyboards and animations on his creations from the novel. de Rico also illustrated covers for music albums.

In 1996, Ul de Rico painted a sequel to his original Goblins story entitled The White Goblin. The paintings were of a similar vein to his previous work, but many were nearly devoid of color and were a stark contrast to the effulgence of the originals. This was done deliberately, as the White Goblin had a more ecologically sinister plot than his brethren, one that involved habitat destruction and the subjugation of natural resources for his own selfish ends. This book seems appropriate for an age group somewhat older than that of the first. The moral lessons (as well as the story, illustrations and language) are more complex and profound than before.

Towards the end of his career, Ul de Rico retired in France.

== Death ==
Ul de Rico died in Udine on August 3, 2023; he was 79 years old.

== Legacy ==
In 1981 and 1997, Japanese musician Masayoshi Takanaka released jazz/rock albums entitled The Rainbow Goblins and The White Goblin that were based on Ul de Rico's books of the same name. On his 1999 album Slowdeath (The Permanent Cry), the rapper Doseone reads an excerpt from the first and last chapter of The Rainbow Goblins. In 2017, the band Primus released The Desaturating Seven, a concept album also inspired by the text and art of The Rainbow Goblins.

== Style ==
Ul de Rico paintings carry a slightly surreal theme which allows readers to be drawn into their colorful imaginary world while still being reminded of the beautiful natural world which inspired them.

=== Selected works ===
- The Rainbow Goblins (1978)
- The Ring of the Nibelung (illustrations plus compilation of extracts from Wagner's text) (1980)
- The Legend of Te Tuna (1982) (illustrations), by Richard Adams
- The White Goblin (1996)

=== Films ===
- Flash Gordon (1980) - artist: clouds
- Die Unendliche Geschichte (1984) - character design
