= Taeko Onuki =

Japanese singer-songwriter and musician (born 1953)

Taeko Ōnuki
- Born: Ōnuki Taeko (大貫 妙子); November 28, 1953 (age 72); Suginami, Tokyo, Japan
- Occupations: Musician; songwriter
- Musical career
- Genres: City pop; new wave; world music; jazz
- Instruments: Vocals; guitar; keyboard; piano
- Years active: 1971–present
- Formerly of: Sugar Babe
- Website: onukitaeko.jp

Taeko Ōnuki (大貫 妙子, Ōnuki Taeko; born November 28, 1953), sometimes romanized as Taeko Ohnuki, is a Japanese singer-songwriter and musician who achieved success and popularity during the 1970s and 80s in the city pop music scene.

== Early life and career ==
Taeko Onuki was born in Suginami Ward, Tokyo, in 1953. Her father was Kenichiro Onuki, a member of the Japanese Special Attack Units during the Second World War.

In 1973, she formed the group Sugar Babe with Tatsuro Yamashita and Kunio Muramatsu. Audiences did not respond very warmly, and the group disbanded three years later. In 1976, Onuki began her solo career by releasing the album Grey Skies, which carried the same sound as Sugar Babe. Her second landmark album, Sunshower was released the following year in 1977 and had a much different style, mixing pop music and jazz. In 1978 she released her third album, Mignonne, in which she worked with producer Eji Ogura, but the album didn't sell as well as hoped. She took a two year break from music afterwards. Beginning from 1980, she released her "Europe" trilogy of albums: Romantique, Aventure and Cliché, taking on a more electronic sound.

== Later career ==
In 1998, she won the 21st Japan Academy Award for Best Music Award in the movie Tokyo Biyori. She sung the theme song for the Japanese dub of Kirikou and the Sorceress, "Hadaka no Kiriku".

From October 5, 2005, she served as Wednesday navigator (DJ) of the program "Night Stories / The Universe" of FM radio station J-WAVE in Tokyo. On November 2, 2006, the soundtrack for the Game Boy Advance game Mother 3 was released, featuring the song "We miss you ~ The theme of love ~", which Onuki sang. She also sang the theme song for Animal Crossing: The Movie based on Nintendo's Animal Crossing video game series.

In 2009, Onuki covered Eiichi Ohtaki's song "Kimi wa Tennen Shoku" for the album A Long Vacation. In 2020, the movie Words Bubble Up Like Soda Pop was released, for which Onuki sang the insert song "Yamazakura".

On March 11, 2022, Onuki participated in the Shuichi "Ponta" Murakami tribute concert "One Last Live", performing "Tokai" and "Mon doux Soleil".

On February 7, 2026, Onuki performed live at The Wiltern in Los Angeles, marking the first time she had performed outside of Japan.

== Discography ==
=== Albums ===
Studio albums
Title	Year	Label
Songs (with Sugar Babe)	1975	Niagara
Grey Skies (グレイ-スカイス)	1976	PANAM/Crown
Sunshower (サンシャワー)	1977	PANAM/Crown
Mignonne (ミニヨン)	1978	RCA/RVC
Romantique (ロマンテイク)	1980	RCA/RVC
Aventure (アファチュ-ル)	1981	RCA/RVC
Cliche (クリシェ)	1982	RCA/RVC
Signifie (シニフェ)	1983	Dear Heart/RVC
Cahier (カイエ)	1984	Dear Heart/RVC
Copine (こピン)	1985	Dear Heart/MIDI
Comin' Soon (カミング・ス-ン)	1986	Dear Heart/MIDI
A Slice of Life (スライス・オブ・ライフ)	1987	Dear Heart/MIDI
Purissima (プリッシマ)	1988	Dear Heart/MIDI
New Moon	1990	Dear Heart/MIDI
Drawing	1992	Eastworld/Toshiba EMI
Shooting Star in the Blue Sky	1993	Eastworld/Toshiba EMI
Tchou! (チャオ！	1995	Eastworld/Toshiba EMI
Lucy (ル -シ-)	1997	Eastworld/Toshiba EMI
Attraction (アトラクシオン)	1999	Eastworld/Toshiba EMI
Ensemble (アンサンブル)	2000	Eastworld/Toshiba EMI
Note (ノ-ト)	2002	Eastworld/Toshiba EMI
One Fine Day (ワン・ファイン・デイ)	2005	Eastworld/Toshiba EMI
UTAU (ウタウ; with Ryuichi Sakamoto)	2010	Eastworld/Toshiba EMI
Tint (テイント; with Ryota Komatsu)	2015	Universal Music Japan

Self-cover albums
Title	Year	Label
Pure Acoustic (ピュア・アコースティック)	1996	Eastworld/Toshiba EMI
Boucles d'Oreilles (ブックル・ドレイユ)	2007	SMDR GT Music

Live albums
Title	Year	Label
Live '93 Shooting Star in the Blue Sky	1996	Eastworld/Toshiba EMI
Taeko Onuki Meets Akira Senju: Symphonic Concert 2016	2016	Pony Canyon
Pure Acoustic 2018	2018	Columbia

Soundtracks
Title	Year	Label
Africa Animal Puzzle	1985	Dear Heart/RVC
Tokyo Biyori	1997	Eastworld/Toshiba EMI
Tokyo Oasis	2011	VAP
