= Sergio Portillo =

Sergio Portillo is a Venezuelan-American painter, sculptor, and illustrator best known for using paints that have human ashes in them.
