= Masayoshi Takanaka =

Japanese musician, producer and composer (born 1953)

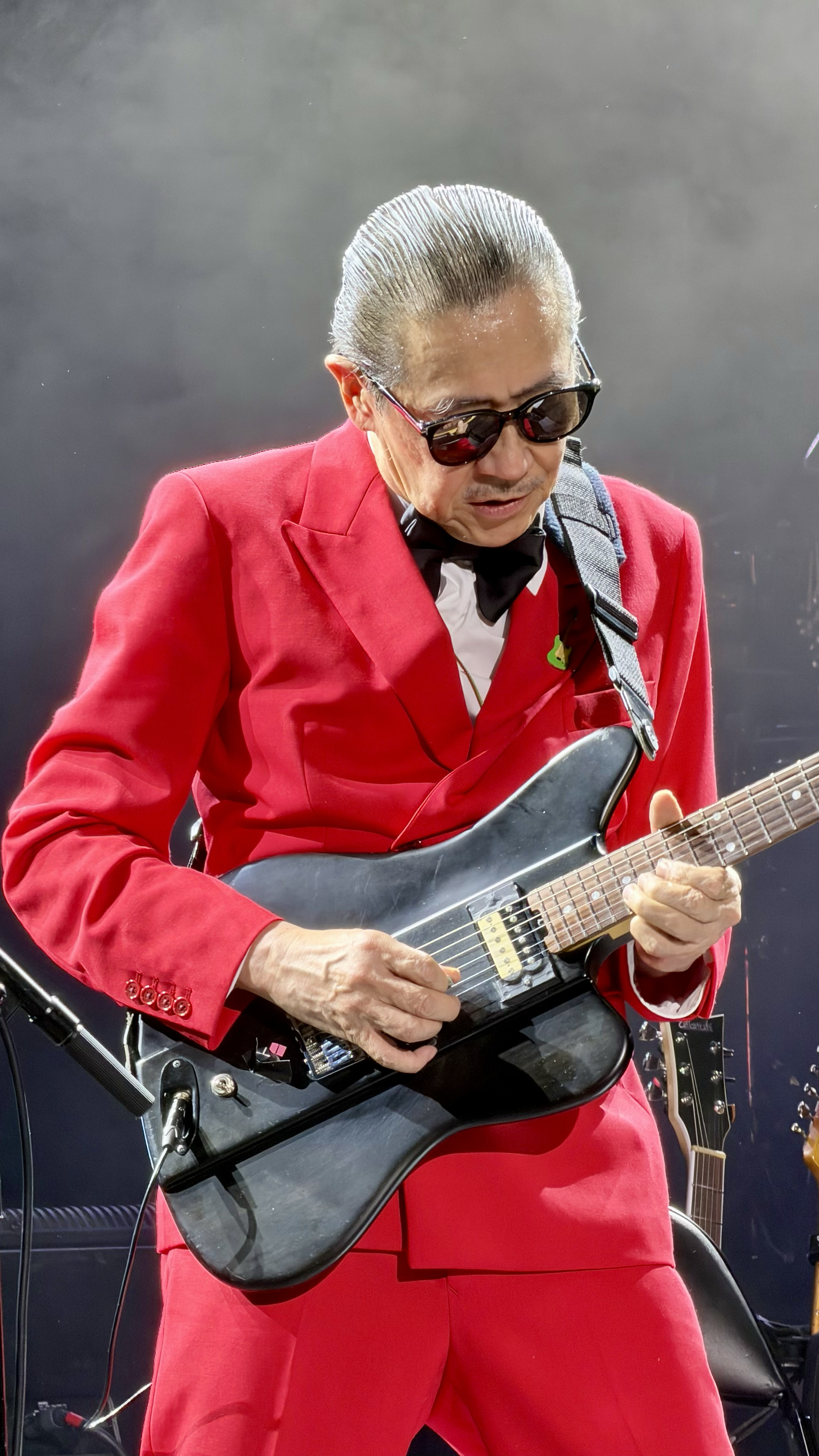
- Takanaka in 2026

Background information
- Born: Masayoshi Ryū (劉 正義); March 27, 1953 (age 73); Kita, Tokyo, Japan
- Genres: Jazz; jazz fusion; city pop; rock; funk; pop; samba; disco
- Occupations: Musician; producer; composer
- Instruments: guitar; bass guitar; vocals
- Years active: 1970–present
- Labels: Lagoon, Kitty
- Formerly of: The Evil, Brush?!, Flied Egg, Sadistic Mika Band, Sadistics, Bacco
- Website: takanaka.com

Masayoshi Takanaka (Note: Japanese: 高中 正義, romanized: Takanaka Masayoshi) (born March 27, 1953) is a Japanese musician and record producer. Known for his virtuosic guitar playing and skilled musicianship, Takanaka rose to fame and achieved commercial success during the 1970s and 1980s. He composes and performs across various different music genres. In a career spanning over 50 years, Takanaka has released more than 20 albums and continues to perform.

== Early life and education ==
Takanaka was born in the Akabane district in Kita, Tokyo, to a Chinese father from Nanjing and a Japanese mother whose surname was Takanaka. His father immigrated to Japan after World War II and later married his mother. Soon after Masayoshi's birth, the family moved to Ōimachi in Shinagawa, where they ran a mahjong parlor called Sangenkaku in the local shopping district.

When he was in the fourth grade, Masayoshi was naturalized as a Japanese citizen, changing his name from Masayoshi Liu (劉 正義) to Masayoshi Takanaka (高中 正義). He began his formal education at Ono Gakuen Elementary School, a private institution, but transferred to Musashi Institute of Technology Junior High School (now Tokyo City University Junior High School) since Ono became an all-girls school at the secondary level. Although he spent most of his time playing guitar, his grades remained excellent. He attempted to transfer to Hibiya High School in order to pursue Tokyo University, but due to the group school assignment system in place at the time, he was instead placed at Kudan High School, a result he found disappointing. He opted instead to remain on the internal track and attend Musashi Institute of Technology High School.

Takanaka was introduced to music at a young age; his parents had records at home. Located near his home were dance halls where people learned to dance, especially Latin dances like the cha-cha-cha and the mambo, as his mother had particularly enjoyed those genres. In addition, his house was right next to a late-night café, so there was always music playing. He later recalled going to sleep while hearing the vibrations of "Mambo No. 5".

Early on, Takanaka was only familiar with Japanese music, listening to Hibari Misora and the Crazy Cats. When he was around sixth grade, Takanaka's elder brother introduced him to the Beatles and the Ventures. Together they watched A Hard Day's Night (1964) and it was to Takanaka's shock to learn about Western music after having only known about Japanese music for so long. Soon after, he asked for an electric guitar and started taking lessons.

Takanaka's first guitar was an inexpensive Japanese model by the brand Teisco. Initially, he did not have an amplifier. Since he could not read music, he bought a book which taught him how to play guitar. However, the examples were all children's songs and simple guitar exercises. Around this time, Takanaka's musical tastes shifted towards Cream, Eric Clapton and Led Zeppelin, whom he tried to emulate. However, he has said his biggest influence was Alvin Lee of Ten Years After.

After school, there were kids who were older than Takanaka that would take over his classroom and have band practice. He would watch them and learn their techniques. While initially only observing, he started to improve at playing guitar; some of the older kids would ask him to play with them. He would even join them in going to a kissaten after school.

The first time Takanaka was on stage was at a Christmas party with some of the older classmates. He also took part in band contests from as early as ninth grade. However his band did not make it past the first round.

== Career ==
=== Debut ===
In the late 1960s, Takanaka joined a band called Escape, performing regularly at U.S. military bases around Tokyo. In winter 1970, at 17 years old, he played in a band named The Evil, with whom he recorded what are currently the earliest known live recordings of his playing. These performances took place at the AIRMAN'S Club in Fuchū, and consisted mainly of covers of Grand Funk Railroad and Jimi Hendrix.

His first professional break came in his senior year of high school during a concert by the band Apryl Fool. One of the members, drunk onstage, shouted to the crowd, "Can someone play guitar for me?" Without hesitation, Takanaka, still wearing his school uniform, jumped onstage and played. That spontaneous moment marked the beginning of his professional music career.

He soon joined Hiro Yanagida's group and performed as a backing musician at Nobuyasu Okabayashi's "Kurui-zaki" self-written/self-performed concert at Hibiya Open-Air Concert Hall in July 1971. In August, he supported Strawberry Path, a band led by Shigeru Narumo and Hiro Tsunoda, at the Hakone Aphrodite rock festival. A month later, he officially joined the group, which was then renamed Flied Egg.

Although he wanted to play guitar, he was initially assigned to bass, accepting reluctantly. Under Narumo's mentorship, Takanaka received daily lessons in music theory and guitar technique, which laid the foundation for his later style. Simultaneously, through Narumo's introduction, he began working as a studio bassist, and later guitarist, kicking off his professional life in the recording industry.

For a lot of the projects he was a studio musician on, a lot of freedom was given to him. Based on simple instruction, he would improvise which enabled him to showcase his guitar playing.

=== Sadistic Mika Band ===
In 1972, after Flied Egg disbanded, he joined the Sadistic Mika Band formed by Kazuhiko Kato. They released their debut self titled album in 1973, and from there he began working as a professional guitarist, where he began to develop his unique style.

Around this time, Takanaka started listening to different types of music. In the beginning, it was mostly British artists like T. Rex and David Bowie. He was also a fan of Santana. After that, he took an interest in Black artists like Marvin Gaye and Stevie Wonder. Up to that point, most of the music he played had been in an 8-beat style. Around this time, however, he started to appreciate the appeal of the 16-beat rhythm, recognizing its complexity.

The band's second album, Kurofune, was recorded in England and released on November 5, 1974. The album sold poorly but is now considered a milestone in Japanese rock. In September 2007, Rolling Stone Japan ranked it number 9 on their list of the "100 Greatest Japanese Rock Albums of All Time".

The band fragmented after the divorce of two of its main members. After the Sadistic Mika Band disbanded in 1975, he formed the Sadistics with remaining band members Yukihiro Takahashi, Tsugutoshi Goto, and Yutaka Imai. The following year, in 1976, he released his first solo album, Seychelles, and has since continued to pursue Sadistics and solo activities. The other members also began to place more emphasis on their solo activities.

=== Solo career ===
After the Sadistics disbanded, he began working as a solo artist, releasing one or two solo albums every year, consisting mainly of his own original songs and guitar instrumental songs. Throughout the 1970s and 1980s, Takanaka continued his output, releasing over twenty albums and singles under Kitty Records until 1984 and EMI from 1985 to 2000. In 1982, Saudade reached number one on the Oricon Albums Chart. In 2000, he formed his own record label, Lagoon Records.

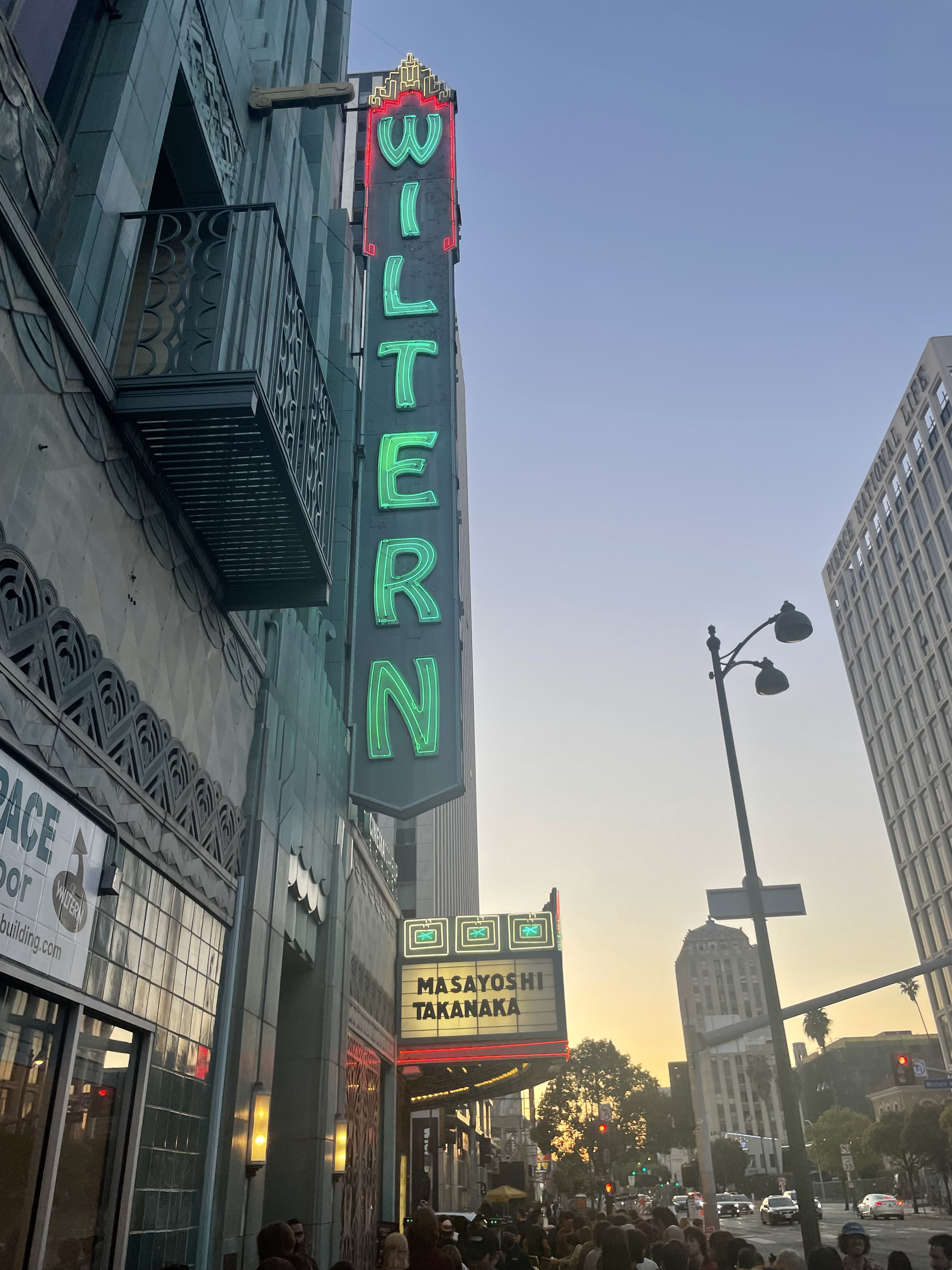
Marquee advertising Takanaka's 2025 concert in Los Angeles

Takanaka is known for his flashy guitars, including a gold colored Fender Stratocaster. He also has a trademark "lagoon-blue" Yamaha SG guitar that he plays during live performances. In 2004, at his performance in Crossover Japan '04, Takanaka unveiled his iconic custom-made surfboard guitar. In this performance, the surfboard is painted light blue with his name in cyan text, however it would later be changed to red with white text. This guitar was used in a 2008 performance of "Beleza Pula" at Super Takanaka Live, one of Takanaka's most popular concerts, and has since become highly famous across the world due to its unique design. In 2014, at the 13th Tokyo Jazz Festival, Takanaka also demonstrated a custom-built guitar which featured a model train set.

He has collaborated with several other musical acts, notably Little Richard, Santana, and Tina Turner.

=== 21st century ===
Takanaka has enjoyed a global resurgence in popularity since the mid-2010s, driven largely by younger audiences outside Japan discovering his music online. His 1981 song "Penguin Dancer" was sampled by Grimes on her song "Butterfly" in 2015. His 1979 song "Blue Lagoon" was named the 14th-best guitar instrumental by Young Guitar Magazine in 2019. In 2025, he performed two sold out shows at the Wiltern Theatre in Los Angeles in his first US performance in 40 years. Takanaka was visibly surprised and entertained by his frenzied reception.

In April 2026, he began his first world tour featuring shows in London, Brooklyn, Chicago, San Francisco, Los Angeles, Sydney, Melbourne and Auckland. All of the shows sold out almost instantly.

== Discography ==
=== Studio albums ===
- Seychelles (1976)
- Takanaka (1977)
- An Insatiable High (1977)
- Brasilian Skies (1978)
- On Guitar (1978)
- Jolly Jive (1979)
- T-Wave (1980)
- Finger Dancin' (1980)
- The Rainbow Goblins (1981)
- Alone (1981)
- Saudade (1982)
- Can I Sing? (1983)
- Natsu Zen Kai (1984)
- Traumatic Kyokutotanteyidan (1985)
- Jungle Jane (1986)
- Rendez-Vous (1987)
- Hot Pepper (1988)
- Gaps! (1989)
- Nail the Pocket (1990)
- O' Holy Night (1990)
- Ballade (1991)
- Fade to Blue (1992)
- Aquaplanet (1993)
- Wood Chopper's Ball (1994)
- Guitar Wonder (1996)
- The White Goblin (1997)
- Bahama (1998)
- Walkin' (1999)
- Hunpluged (2000)
- Guitar Dream (2001)
- The Moon Rose (2002)
- Surf & Turf (2004)
- Sadistic Takanaka (2006)
- Natsudo (Summer Road) (2009)
- Karuizawa Daydream (2010)
- Ukulele Seychelles (2011)
- 40th Year Rainbow (2011)
- Takanaka Sings (2013)
- My Favorite Songs (2015)

=== Collaboration albums ===
- Little Richard Meets Masayoshi Takanaka (1992) (with Little Richard)
- Covers (1995) (with Pauline Wilson)

=== Selected compilation albums ===
- All Of Me (1979)
- Masayoshi Takanaka I (1980)
- Masayoshi Takanaka II (1980)
- Super Selection (1981)
- Super Selection II (1981)
- Horizon Dream (1981) (with Jun Fukamachi and Carioca)
- Fantasic Guitar World (1982) (with Kazumi Watanabe)
- Horizon Dream Vol. 2 (1982) (with Mimi Izumi Kobayashi and Carioca)
- Familia by Takanaka (1981)
- JUMP SHOT (1982)
- Takanaka '76-'82 (1983)
- With Sadistics 全曲集 (1985)
- Singing And Playing (1985)
- Go-On (1985)
- Ready To Fly / The Best (1986)
- Sweet Noiz Magic (1987)
- Best One (1988)
- Best on the Beach (1992)
- On The Highway (Takanaka Best) (1992)
- The Lover (1993)
- Takanaka Spirits (1994)
- Best Of Me (Takanaka Anthology 1976-1984) (1995)
- Winter Days & Starry Nights (1996)
- Remix The Best (1996)
- Super Takanaka Best (1997)
- The Best 2001 (2001)
- Papa's Lagoon (2001)
- Re-Mix Lagoon (2001)
- Best Collection (2002)
- Takanaka The Box - Kitty Years (2004)
- Blue Lagoon (2004)
- Golden Best (2004)
- Sounds Of Summer - The Very Best Of Masayoshi Takanaka (2005)
- Prime Selection (2006)
- Super Collection Kitty Years (2012)
- Golden☆Best EMI Years (2013)
- Essential Best 1200 (2018)
- Takanaka All Time Super Best (2021)
- Takanaka All Time Super Best - Selection (2022)
- Golden☆Best (2022)

=== Live albums ===
- Super Takanaka Live! (1980)
- Rainbow Goblins Story/ Live at Budokan (1981)
- Ocean Breeze (1982)
- Rainbow Goblins Story / Live at Budokan (1986)
- Jungle Jane Tour Live (1986)
- One Night Gig (1991)
- Covers (1995) (with Pauline Wilson)
- Niji Densetsu II - Live at Budokan - Time Machine to the Past (1997)
- The Man with the Guitar (Recorded at Liveteria) (2001)
- 30th Anniversary Power Live With Friends (2001)
- 2002 Live + Season's Greetings! (2002)
- Crossover Japan '05 Live (2005)
- Super Studio Live! (2014)
- Super Best Live 2023 Ultra Seven-T (2025)
- Debut 50th Anniversary The Rainbow Goblins Final (2025)
- Takanaka Super Live 2025 Black Ship in LA (2026)

=== Videos ===
- Takanaka Super Live (1981)
- Takanaka & Santana - Summer Live Super Session (TV Broadcast) (1981)
- Rainbow Goblins Story / Live at Budokan (1981)
- Takanaka World (1981)
- Guitar Fantasia (1982)
- Go On (1985)
- Jungle Jane Tour (1986)
- Hot Pepper Tour Live (1998) (TV Broadcast)
- The Party's Just Begun (1989)
- One Night Gig (1991)
- Caribbean Dream (1992) [Lost Laserdisc]
- For Lovers (1992) [Lost Laserdisc]
- Takanaka On The Highway (1992) [Lost Laserdisc]
- Takanaka On The Beach (1992) [Lost Laserdisc]
- Best on the Wind (1994) [Lost Laserdisc]
- Covers - Live At The Complex (1995)
- Niji Densetsu II - Live at Budokan - Time Machine to the Past (1997)
- Takanaka Live 2003 (2003)
- Takanaka Super Live 2004 (2004)
- Takanaka Super Live 2005 (2005)
- Crossover Japan '05 Live (with Issei Noro) (2005)
- Takanaka Super Live 2007 (2007)
- Takanaka Super Live 2008 (2008)
- Takanaka Super Live 2009 (2010)
- Takanaka Super Live 2010 (2011)
- Takanaka 40th Debut Anniversary - Super Collection (2012)
- Takanaka Super Live 2012 (2013)
- 60th Birthday Anniversary Live Takanaka Was Reborn (2014)
- Super Takanaka Live 2015 ～My Favorite Songs (2016)
- 45th Debut Anniversary - The Best (2017)
- Christmas Special 2017 Live (2018)
- Brasilian Skies 40th (Super Live 2018) (2019)
- Super Live 2019 - Blue Lagoon 40th Anniversary - Christmas Special (2020)
- Super Live 2020 - Rainbow Finger Dancin' - Christmas Special (2021)
- Debut 50th Anniversary - Super Live 2021 (2022)
- Takanaka Super Live 2022 ~ Saudade 40th Anniversary (2023)
- SUPER BEST LIVE 2023 ULTRASEVEN-T TOUR FINAL @ Zepp Haneda (Livestream) (2023)
- Super Best Live 2023 ULTRASEVEN-T (2024)
- Takanaka Super Live 2025 BLACK SHIP in LA (2025)

=== Singles ===
- Sweet Agnes / Tokyo Reggie (1976)
- Sweet Agnes / I Remember You (1976)
- Mambo No. 5 (Disco Dango) / Oh! Tengo Suerte (1977)
- Mambo No. 5 (Disco Dango) / April Wave (1977)
- Star Wars Samba / Beleza Pula (1978)
- Parallel Turn / Taj Mahal (1979)
- Blue Lagoon / Ready to Fly (1980)
- My Secret Beach / Early Bird (1980)
- You Can Never Come To This Place / Soon (1981)
- Alone / Speed of Love (1981)
- White Lagoon (1981)
- Saudade / Chil Me Out (1982)
- Chill Me Out / A Fair Wind (1982)
- Jumping Take Off / Tears Of The Sun (1983)
- To You / Eona (1983)
- Blue Lagoon / Finger Dancin' (1984)
- Welcome To Club Tropicalypso / Dancing To Cat Guitar (1985)
- Nagisa・Moderato / The Line Is Busy (1985)
- China / China (Extended Club Mix) (1985)
- Teaser / Chase (1985)
- Epidaurus / Illusion (1985)
- Santa Claus Is Coming To Town / The Young And The Restless (1986)
- Shake It / Jungle Jane (1986)
- Warm Summer Woman / When You're Near Me (1986)
- Bad Chicken / Summer You (1987)
- Smoother / Standing On The Edge Of Love (1987)
- Shady Lady / Blue Lagoon (New Version) (1988)
- Biscayne Blue / Pimienta (Hot Pepper) (1988)
- The Party's Just Begun / Suite "Keys" (1989)
- Can You Feel It / Dancin' In Jamaica (1990)
- Ballade 2U / Nagisa '91 (1991)
- Blue Shark / Triggerfish (1993)
- Another Summer Day / Two Of Us (1993)
- Guitar Wonder (Herbal Ecstasy Sadistic Mix) / Nagisa Moderato (Super Depth Mix) / Another Summer Day (Lo-Fl Summer Mix) / Ready To Fly (Alphaville Mix) (1996)
- Takajazz / Guitar Wonder / Sunday After Casino / En Aranjues Con Tu Amor (1996)
- Blue Lagoon (Readymade Mix) / Blue Lagoon (Bonus Beats) (2003)
- Blue Lagoon 2003 - Hot Summer Breeze / Blue Lagoon 2003 - Hot Summer Breeze (Sunaga t Experience's Du Jazz Mix) (2003)

=== Appears on ===
- The Evil – Live At Fuchu (1970)
- Brush!? – Brush (1971)
- Nobuyasu Okabayashi - Oira Ichi Nuketa (1971)
- Nobuyasu Okabayashi - Okabayashi Nobuyasu Jisaku-Jien Concert: Kurizaki (1971)
- Garo – Garo 3 (1972)
- 泉谷しげる – 春夏秋冬 (1972)
- 泉谷しげる – 地球はお祭りさわぎ (1972)
- Maki Asakawa – ブルー・スピリット・ブルース = Blue Spirit Blues (1972)
- Flied Egg – Dr. Siegel's Fried Egg Shooting Machine (1972)
- Flied Egg – Good Bye (1972)
- Yōsui Inoue = 井上陽水 – 陽水II／センチメンタル (1972)
- なぎらけんいち – 万年床 / なぎらけんいち参上 (1972)
- 柳田ヒロ – Hiro (1972)
- 日暮し – 日暮し(1973)
- Bruce Bauer – Kids - Members Of Nature's Revival (1973)
- 井上陽水 – 氷の世界 (1973)
- Sadistic Mika Band – Sadistic Mika Band (1973)
- 杉田二郎 – 旅立つ彼 - Portrait Of Jiro Sugita (1973)
- 風車 – 風車 (1973)
- Seiji Yamashita – 猫一匹うらぶれ哀し (1973)
- Buzz – Buzz Live! (1973)
- Hiro Yanagida – Hirocosmos (1973)
- よしだたくろう – Live '73 (1973)
- 泉谷 しげる – 光と影 (1973)
- Chie – 23 - Twenty-Three Years Old (1974)
- 遠藤賢司 – Kenji (1974)
- Sadistic Mika Band – Black Ship (1974)
- 野坂昭如 – 分裂唄草紙 (1974)
- Various – Polydor New Sounds Wave (1974)
- Sadistic Mika Band – Hot! Menu (1975)
- 玉木宏樹 & S.M.T – Time Paradox (1975)
- Tin Pan Alley – キャラメル・ママ (1975)
- かまやつひろし = Monsieur* – あゝ、我が良き友よ (1975)
- 長谷川きよし – 街角 (1975)
- Kosetsu Minami – かえり道 (1975)
- いまなりあきよし, Hope Band と 新室内楽協会 – 無風地帯 (1975)
- 下田逸郎 – 銀の魚 = Silver Fish (1975)
- Takashi Nishioka = 西岡たかし – 哀しい歌 (1975)
- 遠藤賢司 – Hard Folk Kenji (1975)
- Eikichi Yazawa – The Star In Hibiya (1976)
- Masao Kusakari = 草刈正雄 – Second (1976)
- 佐井好子 = Yoshiko Sai – 密航 (1976)
- Sadistic Mika Band – Mika Band Live In London (1976)
- 杉田二郎 – 前夜 (1976)
- 井上陽水 – 招待状のないショー (1976)
- Hitoshi Komuro, Takuro Yoshida, Yosui Inoue, Shigeru Izumiya – Christmas (1976)
- 小椋 佳 – 道草 (1976)
- 来生たかお* – 浅い夢 (1976)
- Jun Fukamachi – Spiral Steps (1976)
- Buzz – Gentle Mind From Buzz (1976)
- Hiromasa Suzuki – High-Flying (1976)
- 小室等 – 父の歌 (1977)
- Akiko Yano = 矢野顕子 – いろはにこんぺいとう(1977)
- Masaki Ueda – 上田正樹 (1977)
- Flying Kitty Band Featuring Ogura Kei, Hoshi Katz, And Yasuda Hiromi – 5･4･3･2･1･0 (1977)
- 桑名正博 – マサヒロ・II (1977)
- Sadistics – Sadistics (1977)
- 日暮し – ありふれた出来事 (1977)
- Jun Fukamachi – Triangle Session (1977)
- Jorge Santana – Jorge Santana (1978)
- Rajie = ラジ – Love Heart = ラヴ・ハート (1978)
- Yellow Magic Orchestra = イエロー・マジック・オーケストラ – Yellow Magic Orchestra = イエロー・マジック・オーケストラ (1978)
- 井上陽水 – "White" (1978)
- Samba Calioca (Carioca) – Sunny Place Carnival (1978)
- Yukihiro Takahashi – Saravah! (1978)
- 泉谷しげる – 泉谷しげるライブ サブ・トータル (1978)
- Katsuo Ohno – Windward Hill (1978)
- Sadistics – We Are Just Taking Off (1978)
- Taeko Ohnuki = 大貫妙子 – Mignonne = ミニヨン (1978)
- Kumiko Hara = 原久美子 – No Smoking = ノー・スモーキング (1978)
- Bacco – Cha Cha Me (1979)
- 井上陽水 – Sneaker Dancer = スニーカーダンサー (1979)
- Naoya Matsuoka & Wesing – The Wind Whispers (1979)
- Led Shock = レッドショック – Red Or Led (1979)
- Sadistics – The Live Show (1979)
- 日暮し – 記憶の果実 (1979)
- Izumi Kobayashi – Coconuts High (1981)
- Carl Carlton – The Bad C.C. (1982)
- 加藤和彦 = Kazuhiko Katoh – あの頃、マリー・ローランサン (1983)
- Yuji Toriyama – 鳥山雄司 (1983)
- 鳴瀬喜博 – Base Metals (1983)
- 呂方, 小虎隊 – 可會遺忘 / 忍着淚說Good-bye (1984)
- 中森明菜 = Akina Nakamori – Possibility = ポシビリティ (1984)
- Nina Atsuko – Loco Island (1984)
- The Pro-Wrestling All Stars – The Pro-Wrestling 2 (1984)
- Jackie Chan = ジャッキー・チェン* – The Boy's Life (1985)
- Kazuo Shiina – The First Mission - Original Soundtrack (1985)
- 張學友 – Smile (1985)
- Sue Cream Sue – Suecréalisme (1986)
- Takuro Yoshida = 吉田拓郎 – Samarkand Blue (サマルカンド・ブルー) (1986)
- 新田一郎 – バリバリ伝説 Part I 筑波篇 (1986)
- Yoko Oginome – ラズベリーの風 = Raspberry Wind (1986)
- Terry Herman – Sand Beige (1986)
- Jackie Chan – 成龍 (1986)
- 新田一郎* – Legend Of BariBari Part II Suzuka Soundtrack = バリバリ伝説 Part II 鈴鹿篇 (1987)
- Ray Ohara – Picaresque (1987)
- Sadistic Mica Band – 天晴 (1989)
- Sadistic Mika Band – Seiten / Sadistic Mika Band Live In Tokyo (1989)
- 周慧敏 – 情迷 (1990)
- Minoru Mukaiya – Tickle The Ivory (1993)
- Yuzo Hayashi – Make Merry (1994)
- Yumi Arai = 荒井由実* – Yumi Arai The Concert With Old Friends 1996.8.13.14.15 Nakano-Sunplaza (1996)
- Takuro Yoshida = 吉田拓郎 – Minna Daisuki = みんな大好き(1997)
- Anri – Moonlit Summer Tales (1998)
- Detective Conan Main Theme (Target version) (1998)
- Yukinojo Mori – Poetic Evolution (1999)
- 劉虹嬅 = Ginny – 好好愛我 (2001)
- Fudge – Sometime Summertime (2003)
- Lily, Hiro Tsunoda, Masayoshi Takanaka - Lily in Love (2003)
- Various – あの頃、マリー・ローランサン2004 - A Tribute To K.Yasui & K.Kato (2004)
- Sadistic Mikaela Band – Narkissos (2006)
- Sadistic Mica Band – Live In Tokyo (2007)
- Hiroshi Sato – Oracle (2012)
