= Paul Neagu =

British - Romanian sculptor

- Born: 1938; Bucharest, Romania
- Died: 2004 (aged 65–66); London, UK
- Known for: Sculpture, Performance Art, Drawing, Painting
- Notable work: Going Tornado, Horizontal Rain, Blinds Bite
- Movement: Contemporary art

Paul Neagu (1938–2004) was a Romanian-British artist, born in Romania and living in England from 1970 onwards, who worked in diverse media such as drawing, sculpture, performance art and watercolor. He died on 16 June 2004 in London.

His influences included Cubism, Marcel Duchamp, Constantin Brâncuși and Joseph Beuys.

His works can be found in public collections including, among others, the British Museum, London, le Fond départemental d'art contemporain, Seine Saint-Denis, Bobigny, France, the Hugh Lane Municipal Gallery of Modern Art, Dublin, the Musee Cantonal de Beaux Arts, Lausanne, Switzerland, the National Museum of Art of Romania, Bucharest, the Philadelphia Museum of Art, Philadelphia, USA, and the Tate Gallery, London. One of the works in Tate's collection, 36 Possibilities Realised Simultaneously, dating 1973-1974, reflects a variety of styles, from oil paint, pencil, ink and gesso. This work captures an early phase of Neagu's first years in the UK, when, in order to experiment as much as possible outside what was expected of him in the new art context, he created a fictitious art group, Generative Art Group, composed of other four artists invented by Neagu.

Paul Neagu featured numerous solo and group exhibitions internationally:

2026: Group exhibition at the occasion of the unveiling of the Trestieni Collection in Brussels, Belgium: "Hidden Treasures of the Neo-Avant-Garde: The Trestieni Collection Unveiled".

2022-2023: Solo exhibition in Timisoara, Romania at the National Museum of Art: "Paul Neagu. A Retrospective".

One of his works, Going Tornado (1974), was used as an album cover for the Bruford album Gradually Going Tornado from 1980.

"For Paul Neagu, art is an expression of 'desire in the face of the systems that attempt to inhibit it', as he writes, and desire involves 'the recovery' of what he calls, variously, the 'hyphen,' the 'abstract', the 'gamma', all of which involve the 'bodily', conveyed particularly through the 'figural essence of sculpting, paintings, drawings'. Neagu's works, whatever their medium, are certainly full of desire, as their visceral energy suggests." Donald Kuspit
