= Olive's Step =

Studio album by Kazumi Watanabe
- Released: September 25, 1977
- Recorded: June 1977
- Studios: Nippon Columbia 1st Studio, Tokyo (Japan)
- Genre: Jazz fusion
- Length: 41:46
- Labels: Better Days; YX-7580-ND
- Producer: Kazumi Watanabe

Kazumi Watanabe chronology
Milky Shade (1976)	Olive's Step (1977)	Mermaid Boulevard (1978)

Professional ratings
Review scores
Source	Rating
AllMusic	3/5 stars

Olive's Step is the sixth album by Japanese guitarist Kazumi Watanabe. The album was released on LP by Better Days label of Nippon Columbia in 1977.

== Track listing ==
Side A
No.	Title	Music	Length
1.	"Olive's Step"	Kazumi Watanabe	4:58
2.	"Inner Wind"	Kazumi Watanabe	4:44
3.	"Mellow Sunshine"	Kazumi Watanabe	6:47
4.	"Movin' Nozzle"	Kazumi Watanabe	4:34
Total length:			19:31

Side B
No.	Title	Music	Length
1.	"Sky"	Kazumi Watanabe	6:37
2.	"Little Apple"	Kazumi Watanabe	3:06
3.	"Dindi"	Antônio Carlos Jobim	6:45
Total length:			22:15

== Personnel ==
- Kazumi Watanabe - Electric guitar (A1-A4, B1-3), Acoustic guitar (A1, A3), Clap Hand(B3)
- Ryuichi Sakamoto - Electric piano (A1-A4), Clavinet (A1), Piano (A2), ARP Odyssey (A2, A4), Yamaha Polyphonic Synthesizer (A2-A4), Solina (A4)
- Hiroshi Matsumoto - Electric piano (B1-B3), ARP Odyssey (B1), Piano (B2-B3), Solina (B2), Clap Hand(B3)
- Tsugutoshi Goto - Electric bass (A1-A4)
- Nobuyoshi Ino - Electric bass (B1-B3), Clap Hand(B3)
- Hiro Tsunoda - Drums (A1-A4)
- Arihide Kurata - Drums (B1-B3), Clap Hand(B3)
- Tatsuji Yokoyama - Percussion (B1-B3)

== Production ==
- Producer - Kazumi Watanabe
- Assistant Producers & Management Office - Zen Production Inc.
- Recording Director - Tomohiro Saito
- Mixing & Remixing Engineer – Kaoru Iida
- Cover Design – Sign-Satoshi Saitoh, Mobuo Izumi
- Art stuff - Hideo Nakata (Mok)
- Cover Photo – Tadayuki Naitoh
- Liner notes - Masamichi Okazaki
- Liner notes - Eiichi Yoshimura (COCB-54209)

== Release history ==
Region	Date	Label	Format	Catalog	Note
Japan	September 25, 1977	Better Days	30cmLP	YX-7580-ND	
Japan	August 5, 1977	Better Days	30cmLP	YX-7581	
Japan	October 21, 1993	Better Days	12cmCD	COCA-11113	
Japan	September 21, 2001	Better Days	12cmCD	COCB-31637	remaster
Japan	December 22, 2004	J-room	12cmCD	COCB-53292	remaster, Peper jacket, KAZUMI BOX
Japan	September 1, 2010	Better Days	12cmCD	COCB-53918	HQCD, KAZUMI WATANABE EARLY YEARS BOX
Japan	September 1, 2010	Columbia Music Entertainment, Inc.	Music download	387861525	iTunes Store
Japan	September 1, 2010	Columbia Music Entertainment, Inc.	Music download	B6ja2j2g4ob4xqvhqkzsl6joehe	Google Play Music
Japan	October 24, 2012	Columbia Music Entertainment, Inc.	Music download	COKM-30934	mora AAC-LC 320kbps
Japan	February 26, 2014	Columbia Music Entertainment, Inc.	Music download	B00IG2CIRM	Amazon.com
Japan	July 19, 2017	Better Days	12cmCD	COCB-54210	UHQCD
