= Endless Way =

Studio album by Kazumi Watanabe
- Released: September 25, 1975
- Recorded: July 7, 1975
- Studio: Nippon Columbia 1st Studio, Tokyo
- Genre: Jazz, fusion
- Length: 41:46
- Label: Columbia; YQ-7511-N
- Producer: Takuo Morikawa

Kazumi Watanabe chronology
Monday Blues (1975)	Endless Way (1975)	Mudari Spirit of Song (1976)

Professional ratings
Review scores
Source	Rating
AllMusic	3/5 stars

Endless Way is the third album by Japanese guitarist Kazumi Watanabe. The album was released as a vinyl LP by the Better Days label of Nippon Columbia in 1975.

== Track listing ==
All music is composed by Kazumi Watanabe

Side A
No.	Title	Length
1.	"On The Horizon"	14:15
2.	"Sadness"	5:16
Total length:		19:31

All music is composed by Kazumi Watanabe

Side B
No.	Title	Length
1.	"Endless Way"	11:35
2.	"The Second Wind"	10:40
Total length:		22:15

== Personnel ==
- Kazumi Watanabe - Electric guitar
- Hidefumi Toki - Soprano saxophone (A1, B2)
- Shigeharu Mukai - Trombone (A1, A2, B2)
- Nobuyoshi Ino - Bass
- Arihide Kurata - Drums

== Production ==
- Producer - Takuo Morikawa
- Mixing and remixing engineer – Kaoru Iida
  Recorded on 7, 10, 11 July 1975 at Nippon Columbia 1st Studio
- Artist management – Michihiko Anjoh, Yoshikazu Nagaya
- Cover design – Sign
- Cover photo – Shin Takaoka
- Liner notes - Eiichi Yoshimura (COCB-54209)

== Release history ==
Region	Date	Label	Format	Catalog	Note
Japan	September 25, 1975	Nippon Columbia	30cmLP	YQ-7511-N	
Japan	August 5, 1977	Better Days	30cmLP	YX-7581	
Japan	December 22, 2004	Better Days	12cmCD	COCB-53292	
Japan	September 1, 2010	Better Days	12cmCD	COCB-53917	HQCD, Remaster, Kazumi Watanabe Early year box
Japan	September 1, 2010	Columbia Music Entertainment, Inc.	Music download		iTunes Store
Japan	September 1, 2010	Columbia Music Entertainment, Inc.	Music download		Amazon
Japan	September 1, 2010	Columbia Music Entertainment, Inc.	Music download		Google Play Music
Japan	July 19, 2017	Better Days	12cmCD	COCB-54209	UHQCD
