= Tokyo Joe =

Tokyo Joe may refer to:

- Tokyo Joe (film) (1949), starring Humphrey Bogart
- Tokyo Joe (album), by Ryuichi Sakamoto and Kazumi Watanabe
- "Tokyo Joe" (Bryan Ferry song), from the album In Your Mind
- a nickname for Ken Eto (1919–2004), Japanese-American mobster and FBI informant
- The ring name of professional wrestler Mr. Hito
- The ring name of professional wrestler Tsuneharu Sugiyama
