= The Bruford Tapes =

Live album by Bruford
- Released: 1979
- Recorded: 12 July 1979
- Genres: Jazz fusion, progressive rock
- Length: 43:37
- Labels: E.G. Records; CD issued by Winterfold Records
- Producer: Michael Billeter

Bruford chronology
| One of a Kind (1979) | The Bruford Tapes (1979) | Gradually Going Tornado (1980) |

The Bruford Tapes is a live 1979 album by the British band Bruford, only issued in the United States, Canada and Japan. It was recorded on July 12, 1979 in Roslyn, New York State and originally broadcast on WLIR radio. Shortly before the tour, guitarist Allan Holdsworth left the band and was replaced by his student John Clark (appearing as "the unknown John Clark" on the album sleeve), who had played with the prog group Quasar. The show features extended performances of material from the group's previous two albums Feels Good to Me and One of a Kind.

== Reception ==
Professional ratings
Review scores
| Source | Rating |
|---|---|
| AllMusic | 4/5 stars |
| The Penguin Guide to Jazz | 3/4 stars |

In a review for AllMusic, Paul Collins wrote: "This is one of the best Bruford albums of this period; those who found the studio releases of these songs to be too cold will be won over by the improvisational intensity of this live show."

The authors of The Penguin Guide to Jazz Recordings called the music "strongly melodic, freewheeling and built round Bruford's ringing percussion."

John Kelman of All About Jazz commented: "The Bruford Tapes, with its combination of high volume intensity, detailed long-form writing and reckless improvisational abandon, does nothing to assuage those looking for easy categorization. It is, however, as fine an example as you're apt to find of the kind of unrestricted exploration and cross-pollination once seen on major labels, but now more often relegated to the small independents."

== Track listing ==
Side one
| No. | Title | Writer(s) | Length |
|---|---|---|---|
| 1. | "Hells Bells" | Dave Stewart, Alan Gowen | 4:02 |
| 2. | "Sample And Hold" | Bill Bruford, Stewart | 6:18 |
| 3. | "Fainting In Coils" | Bruford | 6:34 |
| 4. | "Travels With Myself - And Someone Else" | Bruford | 4:37 |

Side two
| No. | Title | Writer(s) | Length |
|---|---|---|---|
| 5. | "Beelzebub" | Bruford | 3:28 |
| 6. | "The Sahara Of Snow (Part One)" | Bruford | 4:46 |
| 7. | "The Sahara Of Snow (Part Two)" | Bruford, Eddie Jobson | 3:07 |
| 8. | "One Of A Kind (Part Two)" | Bruford, Stewart | 8:06 |
| 9. | "5g" | Bruford, Stewart, Jeff Berlin | 2:39 |

2005 remaster bonus track
| No. | Title | Writer(s) | Length |
|---|---|---|---|
| 10. | "The Age Of Information" | Bruford, Stewart |

== Personnel ==
- Bill Bruford – drums & percussions
- Dave Stewart – electric piano, synthesizer, electronics
- Jeff Berlin – bass guitar, vocal on 10
- John Clark – electric guitar
