= Bill Bruford =

English drummer

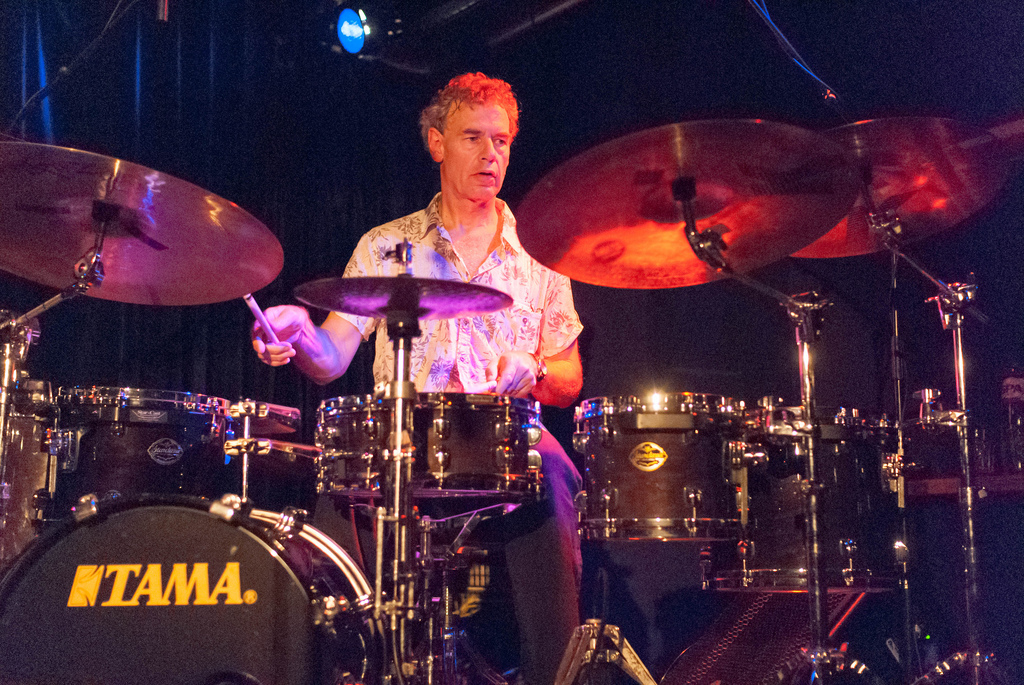
- Bruford performing in 2008

Background information
- Born: William Scott Bruford; 17 May 1949 (age 77); Sevenoaks, Kent, England
- Genres: Art rock; avant-garde; jazz; jazz fusion; new wave; instrumental rock; progressive rock
- Occupations: Musician; songwriter; producer; record label owner; musicologist; writer
- Instruments: Drums; percussion
- Years active: 1967–2009; 2022–present (Note: Bruford announced his retirement from performing and recording on 1 January 2009. His final public gig was with his band Earthworks on 31 July 2008. Bruford was retired from public performance (save for a short stint with the Surrey covers band Ann Bailey's Soul House) until he returned to live music in joining the jazz band Pete Roth Trio, formed in 2022, and making an appearance at the John Wetton Tribute Concert at Trading Boundaries in 2023.)
- Labels: Polydor; E.G.; Voiceprint; Winterfold; Summerfold
- Member of: Pete Roth Trio
- Formerly of: Mabel Greer's Toyshop; Yes; King Crimson; Gong; National Health; U.K.; Bruford; Earthworks; Anderson Bruford Wakeman Howe; Bruford Levin Upper Extremities
- Website: billbruford.com

William Scott Bruford (born 17 May 1949) is an English drummer and percussionist. He is known for his work from the late 1960s to the 1990s, primarily as both a founding member of Yes and as a member of three forms of King Crimson.

Bruford co-founded Yes in 1968 and recorded five albums with them, including The Yes Album, Fragile (both 1971) and Close to the Edge (1972). He left Yes in 1972, and spent the rest of the 1970s recording and touring with numerous groups. Most prominently, he performed with King Crimson; then after they disbanded in 1974, he worked with Roy Harper and U.K., and toured with Genesis in 1976 as a part of their A Trick of the Tail promotional tour. In 1978 he formed his own group, Bruford, who were active until 1980.

During the 1980s Bruford returned to King Crimson for three years in their Discipline line-up, consisting of him and Robert Fripp along with Americans Tony Levin and Adrian Belew. He performed on their albums Discipline (1981), Beat (1982) and Three of a Perfect Pair (1984), until the group disbanded again in 1984. After this, he collaborated with several artists (including Patrick Moraz and David Torn) and formed his own electric jazz band, Earthworks, in 1986. He then played with his former Yes bandmates in the supergroup Anderson Bruford Wakeman Howe, which eventually led to a very brief second stint in Yes. Bruford played in King Crimson for his third and final tenure from 1994 to 1997 as part of the Double Trio, then continued with a new acoustic configuration of Earthworks.

In 2009, Bruford announced his retirement from professional drumming. He pursued other projects, including the operation of his two record labels, Summerfold and Winterfold, releasing an autobiography, and speaking and writing about music. In 2016, he received a doctorate in music from the University of Surrey. In that year Bruford ranked No. 16 on Rolling Stone's list of the "100 Greatest Drummers of All Time". In 2017, Bruford was inducted into the Rock and Roll Hall of Fame as a member of Yes. In 2022, after a 13-year hiatus, he returned to live performance as a member of the Pete Roth Trio.

== Early life ==
Bruford was born on 17 May 1949 in Sevenoaks, Kent, the third child of Betty and John Bruford, a veterinary surgeon. He has a brother, John, and a sister, Jane. He attended New Beacon School in Sevenoaks, followed by Tonbridge School in Tonbridge, a boarding school. Bruford decided to take up drumming at thirteen after watching American jazz drummers on the BBC2 television series Jazz 625, and practised the instrument in the attic of his house. He cites Max Roach, Joe Morello, Art Blakey and Ginger Baker as the most influential drummers on him as a young man. Around this time, Bruford's sister bought him a pair of drum brushes as a birthday present, and Bruford would practise using them on album sleeves after he was told the sound resembled a snare drum while watching Jazz 625. Bruford recalled it as "a perfect education". Though he was given a single snare drum at first, Bruford gradually built a full drum kit. He later took a few lessons from Lou Pocock, a member of the Royal Philharmonic Orchestra.

During his time at boarding school, Bruford befriended several fellow jazz fans, one of them a drummer who gave Bruford lessons in improvisation and a tutorial book by American jazz drummer Jim Chapin. In 1966 and 1967, Bruford performed in the Breed, an R&B/soul four-piece with Stu Murray on guitar, Mike Freeman on saxophone, Ray Bennett (who would later play with Peter Banks's Flash) on bass, and Doug Kennard on guitar and vocals. After leaving school, Bruford took a gap year before he intended to study economics at Leeds University. In January 1968, he unsuccessfully auditioned for a place in Savoy Brown at a pub in Battersea, but he "hung around until the end and told them they had the wrong guy ... I talked my way into it". His tenure only lasted three gigs because he "messed with the beat", and followed this with a brief stint in the psychedelic rock band Paper Blitz Tissue. Bruford then spotted an ad in a music shop from the Noise, who were looking for a drummer to play with them for a six-week residency at the Piper Club in Rome, Italy. He remembered the experience as "ghastly", felt his bandmates could not play properly, and had to hitchhike back to London with his kit.

== Career ==
=== 1968–1974: Yes and King Crimson ===
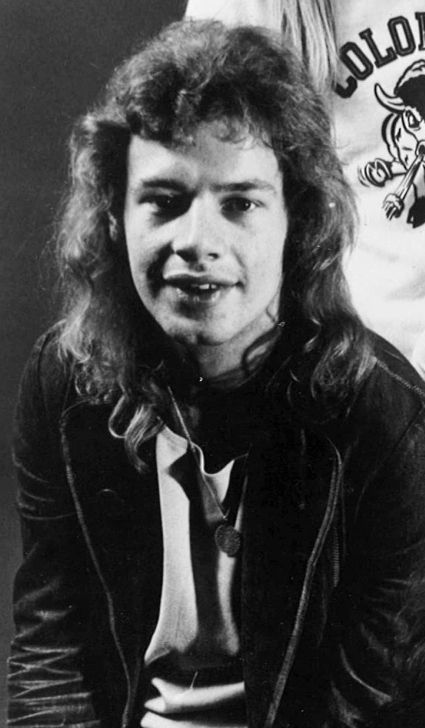
Bruford in 1972

Following his return to London, the 19-year-old Bruford settled into a flat in north London and placed an advertisement for drum work in Melody Maker. It was spotted by singer Jon Anderson of the psychedelic rock band Mabel Greer's Toyshop, formed of bassist Chris Squire and guitarist Clive Bayley, who sought a replacement for their departing drummer, Bob Hagger. The four met on 7 June 1968; Anderson was so impressed with Bruford that he invited him to play with the band that evening at the Rachel McMillan College in Deptford. Their entire set consisted of "In the Midnight Hour" by Wilson Pickett as it was the only song they all knew how to play through, but Bruford was impressed with the band's ability to sing in harmony. Following the gig, Bruford had several offers to join soul bands, one of which earned as much as £30 a week, but chose to remain with Anderson and Squire, who took charge in forming a new band. The four entered rehearsals, which ended in Peter Banks replacing Bayley on guitar, Tony Kaye on keyboards, and the group changing their name to Yes.

Bruford played on Yes's first five studio albums during his initial tenure: Yes (1969), Time and a Word (1970), The Yes Album (1971), Fragile (1971), and Close to the Edge (1972). He received a writing credit on just five tracks: "Harold Land", "Yours Is No Disgrace", "Heart of the Sunrise", "And You and I", and "Five Per Cent for Nothing", a 35-second track on Fragile that was his first attempt at composition. His main interest was allowing the drums to "be heard" as Squire played his bass often in the higher register, and so developed a style that involved "unusual beat placement" and time signatures. He developed his musical understanding during this time, learning "how to read the horizontal lines, but not the vertical notes." Bruford recalled Yes being hot blooded and argumentative, with personality conflicts being the eventual reason for his exit. These, for him, included problems in understanding other members' accents, differences in social backgrounds, and many other issues that set the band in a constant state of friction between Anderson, Squire, and himself.

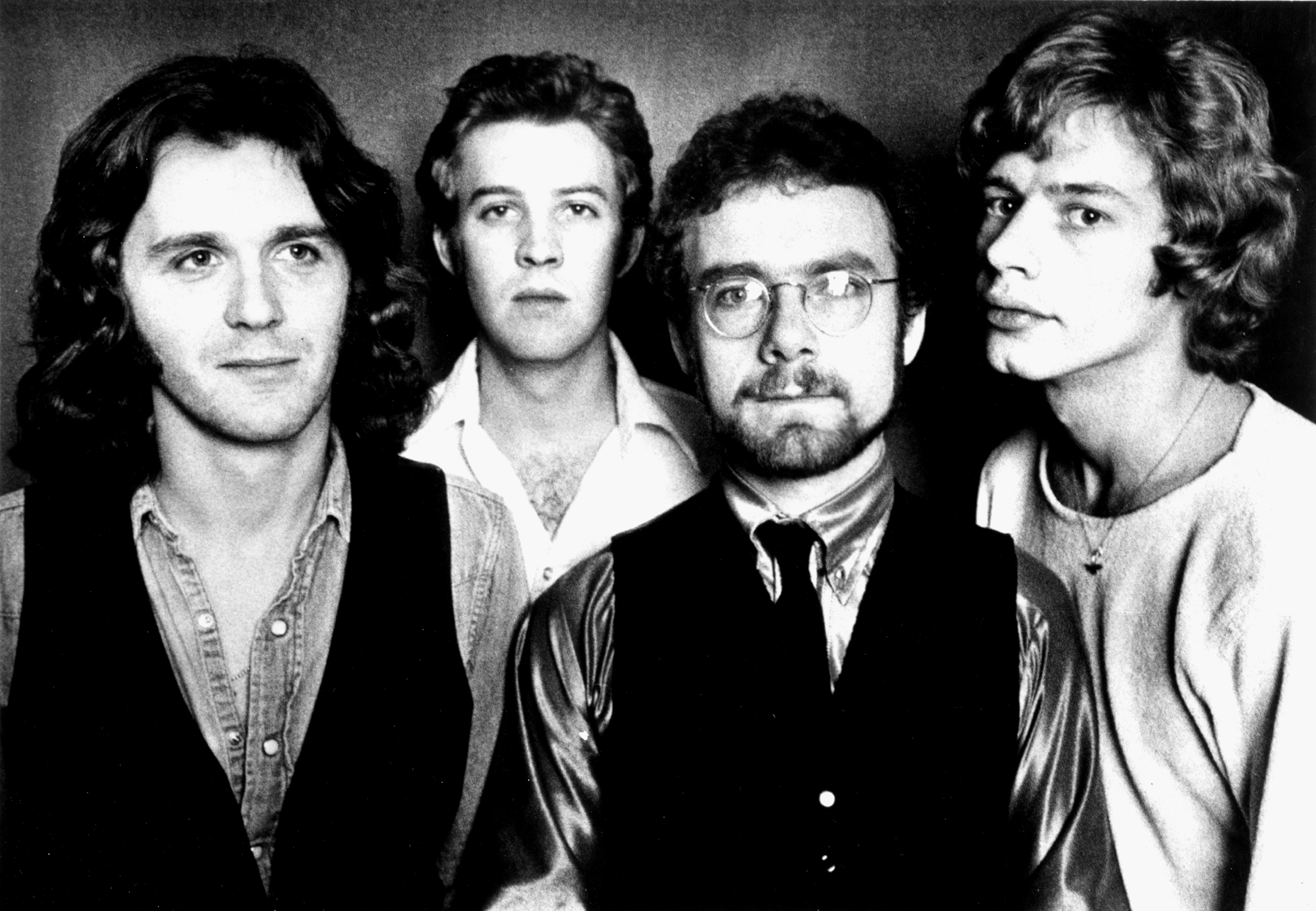
King Crimson in 1974. From left: John Wetton, David Cross, Robert Fripp, and Bruford

In July 1972, after Close to the Edge had been recorded, Bruford quit to join King Crimson, later explaining: "King Crimson was one of the only gigs for a rock drummer where you could play in 17/16 and still stay in decent hotels". Rehearsals began in September 1972, followed by an extensive UK tour. His instinct to remember complicated drum parts was shown when he learned how to play the long percussion and guitar part in the middle of "21st Century Schizoid Man", "by listening to it and just learning it." Bruford cites the six months free jazz percussionist Jamie Muir was in the band as highly influential on him as a player. Bruford is featured on Larks' Tongues in Aspic (1973), Starless and Bible Black (1974), Red (1974) and the live album USA (1975). Robert Fripp disbanded King Crimson in September 1974.

=== 1974–1980: Genesis, Bruford, and U.K. ===
After leaving King Crimson, Bruford felt his "sense of direction was rather stymied" and was unsure on his next step. In late 1974, he became a temporary member of the Anglo-French band Gong for a European tour after drummer Laurie Allan was busted for drugs at a border. Bruford then chose to wait for an appealing offer while earning money as a session musician. The sessions were few, however, and the ones that he was a part of he called "unmitigated disasters". In 1975, Bruford played drums on Fish Out of Water by Chris Squire, HQ by Roy Harper, and At the Sound of the Bell by Pavlov's Dog. Later in the year, he performed as guest percussionist for the jazz fusion band Brand X, featuring Phil Collins on drums. Bruford then joined National Health for several live performances, but declined an offer to join full-time as there were already many writers in the group, and felt his contributions to the music, the majority of which was already written, would have caused problems.

By mid-1976, Bruford had rehearsed with Ray Gomez and Jeff Berlin in the US but plans to form a group failed, partly due to the members living far away from each other. He wished not to force a band together, so he decided to "watch, wait, observe and absorb". From March to July 1976, Bruford toured with Genesis on their 1976 tour of North America and Europe, supporting A Trick of the Tail. It was their first album and tour after original frontman Peter Gabriel had left, leaving drummer Phil Collins to sing lead vocals. Bruford had known Collins for several years and suggested sitting in the drum seat until Genesis found a permanent replacement. Bruford is featured on the Genesis: In Concert film and the live albums Seconds Out (1977) and Three Sides Live (1982). In late 1976, Bruford became involved in a tentative rock trio with Rick Wakeman and John Wetton, but they soon disbanded. According to Bruford, "A&M Records was unwilling to let its 'star,' Wakeman, walk off with a used, slightly soiled King Crimson rhythm section, and the idea folded." Bruford then rejoined National Health for a short stint.

In 1977, Bruford recorded his debut solo album Feels Good to Me (1978), with Dave Stewart (keyboards), Jeff Berlin (bass), and Allan Holdsworth (guitar). This was Bruford's first attempt at songwriting on a substantial level, and he spent a lot of time developing tunes on the piano. The four stuck together and became a full-time band named Bruford, which also featured Annette Peacock on vocals, Kenny Wheeler on flugelhorn, and John Goodsall on rhythm guitar. Later in 1978, Bruford reunited with John Wetton and formed the progressive rock group U.K. After their debut album U.K. (1978) and several tours, Holdsworth and Bruford left the group due to disagreements on the group's musical direction. Bruford resumed activity in his own group to release One of a Kind (1979). Almost entirely instrumental, the album contains some spoken lines by Bruford during the introduction to "Fainting in Coils". Subsequent gigs spawned the live releases Rock Goes to College and The Bruford Tapes (1979). Their final album, Gradually Going Tornado (1980), features backing vocals from Canterbury scene stalwarts Barbara Gaskin and Amanda Parsons, as well as Georgina Born on cello. Unfinished songs for a projected fourth album were recorded in 1980, but remained unreleased until 2017.

=== 1981–1993: King Crimson, Earthworks, ABWH, and Yes ===
In 1981, Bruford returned to King Crimson in a new formation with Fripp, Tony Levin, and Adrian Belew. The four recorded Discipline (1981), Beat (1982), and Three of a Perfect Pair (1984), all featuring Bruford on an acoustic and Simmons electronic hybrid kit. Bruford embraced the Simmons drums for the next fifteen years as it allowed him to play programmed chords, samples, tuned pitches, and sound effects, which expanded his musical palette. In 1984, Fripp disbanded the group; Bruford picked the live album Absent Lovers: Live in Montreal (1998) as one of the best rock albums he played on.

In 1983, Bruford formed a duo with Swiss keyboardist and former Yes member Patrick Moraz after he learned that Moraz was living close to him in Surrey. The project had Bruford develop a "real taste for improvising". Under the name Moraz/Bruford, the two released Music for Piano and Drums (1983) and Flags (1985), two albums recorded on acoustic instruments. The albums were supported with several live shows, including a tour of Japan. Also in 1985, Bruford was approached by Jimmy Page to be the drummer for his new band with Paul Rodgers and Pino Palladino named the Firm. He recalled: "We rehearsed briefly, but I think decided we were mutually unsuited!"

In 1986, Bruford formed his jazz group Earthworks with Django Bates, Iain Ballamy and Mick Hutton (later replaced by Tim Harries), with initial assistance from Dave Stewart. By then, electronic drum technology had improved to Bruford's satisfaction and he resumed using the Simmons kit. The band toured the US club circuit through 1987.

Bruford put Earthworks on hold in late 1988, after Jon Anderson invited him to play on a new album that also featured past Yes members Rick Wakeman and Steve Howe. Bruford was under the impression that he was performing on an Anderson solo album, but the four went on to become a group and named themselves Anderson Bruford Wakeman Howe (ABWH). Bruford later remarked that while ABWH could have been an interesting group had they been given time to develop instead of being pushed immediately into a recording studio, for him it was primarily a business-motivated arrangement which he took on so that he could pay for Earthworks. Bruford was attracted to the idea of recording on Montserrat, and convinced Anderson to have Tony Levin on bass. Anderson Bruford Wakeman Howe (1989) was supported by a world tour, and in 1990, while recording a second album, ABWH merged with Yes to become an eight-member formation. Union (1991), featuring tracks from both groups, was criticised by almost the entire band; Bruford called it "the worst record I've ever been on". He took part in the subsequent Union Tour in 1991 and 1992, and though he enjoyed the enthusiastic audiences in large venues and performing with former bandmates, he found the experience "pretty horrible". After the tour, Bruford and Howe became involved in an orchestral project that reinterpreted Yes songs with an orchestra, entitled Symphonic Music of Yes (1993).

Bruford resumed with Earthworks in January 1991, and the group released a studio and live album. After Bates left, Bruford disbanded the group in 1993. After this, their record label pushed for Bruford and Holdsworth to form a new band, but neither were too keen on the idea and the idea fell through. In the early 1990s, Bruford became an active drum clinician and taught small groups in several universities.

=== 1994–2009: King Crimson, Earthworks II, final collaborations, and retirement ===
King Crimson re-emerged once more in 1994 as a six-piece band, consisting of its 1980s line-up with the additions of Pat Mastelotto sharing drumming duties with Bruford, and Trey Gunn on Chapman Stick. Dubbed the "double trio" configuration, they released Vrooom (1994), Thrak (1995), and two live albums, B'Boom: Live in Argentina (1995) and Thrakattak (1996). After Bruford and Fripp discussed the idea of holding improvisational performances together and invited Gunn and Levin to join them, Fripp conceived the ProjeKcts idea of having different subsets of King Crimson working separately as a way of developing new material for the band. The first group, ProjeKct One, performed live at the Jazz Cafe in London from 1–4 December 1997. Bruford then left the group, and King Crimson altogether, mainly due to his frustration with rehearsals, which he felt came to nothing. This also marked the end of Bruford using the Simmons electronic drums due to the high overhead costs, the time required to program the kit, and the lackluster Japanese model that was made after the original manufacturer went bankrupt.

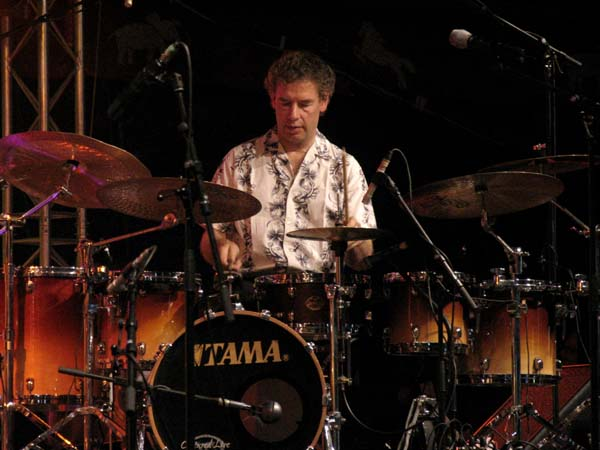
Bruford at the Moers Festival in Germany, 2004

After King Crimson, Bruford focused on acoustic jazz, partly because he felt jazz required a return to a beginning jumping-off point. In 1997 he formed a new line-up of Earthworks, using the group as a base for British musicians and to give them experience of performing internationally. This line-up involved pianist Steve Hamilton, saxophonist Patrick Clahar, and double bassist Geoff Gascoyne, soon replaced by Mark Hodgson. Although Earthworks underwent further line-up changes with Tim Garland replacing Clahar as saxophonist in 2001, Gwilym Simcock replacing Hamilton as pianist in 2004, and Laurence Cottle replacing Hodgson on bass circa 2005, the revived band maintained a consistent, predominantly acoustic post-bop approach focusing on Bruford's compositions. During 2005, Earthworks temporarily combined with Garland's Underground Orchestra to form the Earthworks Underground Orchestra.

During his final stint with Earthworks, Bruford collaborated with others in the final twelve years of his career. These included a collaboration with Americans Eddie Gomez and Ralph Towner in 1997, the jazz-rock band Bruford Levin Upper Extremities in 1998, a duo with Dutch pianist Michiel Borstlap from 2002 to 2007, the contemporary composer Colin Riley with the Piano Circus collective in 2009, and presenting drum clinics. In 2003, Bruford established two record labels: Winterfold Records, which cover his early releases including his guitar and rock-oriented music, and Summerfold Records, focusing on his jazz output, mostly from post-1987. Both are distributed by Voiceprint Records.

Bruford's final public gig was with Earthworks on 31 July 2008 at Ronnie Scott's in London. In January 2009, at the age of 59, Bruford announced that he was retiring from performing and recording, after 41 years, effective from 1 January. Among the various reasons for retiring were his growing performance anxiety that "was making life intolerable", his diminishing stamina required to tour and perform on an international scale, and what he perceived as a bleak future for the style of drumming that appealed to him. The final studio album he played on was Skin and Wire: Play the Music of Colin Riley (2009) by Piano Circus. Bruford had kept a diary of his gigs throughout his career, and logged 2,885 gigs.

=== 2009–2022: Retirement ===
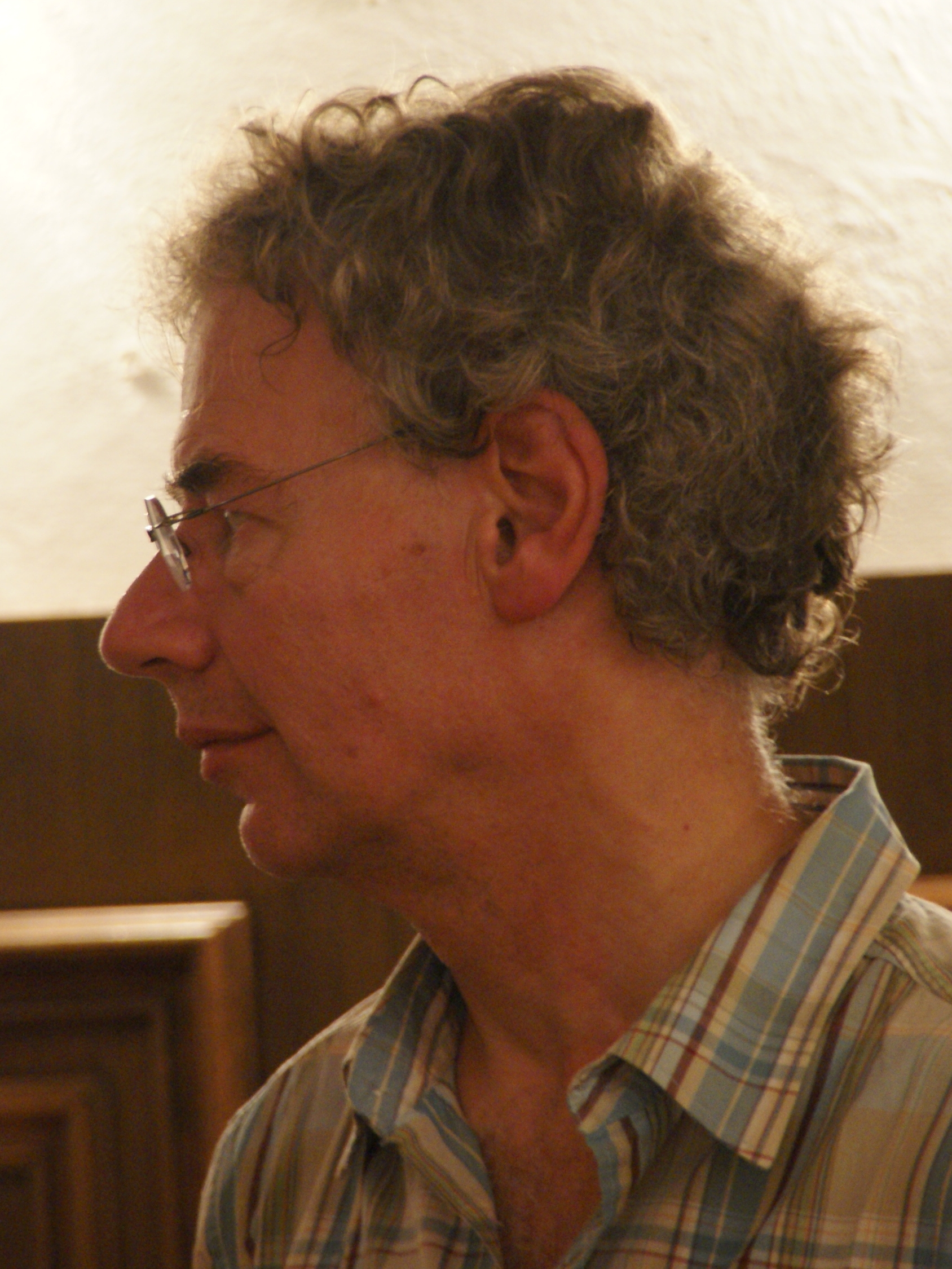
Bruford in 2009, the first year of his 13-year hiatus as a performer

In early 2009, Bruford published his autobiography. Not long into his retirement, Bruford had a brief, low key stint in Ann Bailey's Soul House, a nine-piece band performing Motown and soul covers in Ewhurst, Surrey.

In February 2016, after four and a half years of study, Bruford received a PhD degree in Music from the University of Surrey. He had wanted to do something related to music following his retirement, and considered his missed opportunity in pursuing higher education in the late 1960s as a factor in his decision to enter academia. The University of Surrey offered to award Bruford an honorary doctorate, but he wanted to put in the effort and work for his degree, which focused on creativity and music performance, specifically with a drum kit. Bruford's thesis, "Making it work: Creative music performance and the Western kit drummer", was posted online in May 2016. Bruford has since written various journal articles, book chapters and liner notes, and presented guest lectures at universities and music institutions in Europe and North America.

In April 2017, Bruford was inducted into the Rock and Roll Hall of Fame as a former member of Yes. He attended the ceremony, but did not perform or deliver an acceptance speech. In March 2018, Bruford introduced Yes at their two London shows during their 50th Anniversary Tour. Later that year, Bruford published his second book, Uncharted: Creativity and the Expert Drummer. It is an adaptation of his PhD dissertation.

In October 2020, Bruford put much of his personal collection of instruments, microphones, tour cases, and other equipment from his career, up for sale, totalling 258 separate listings. In August 2021, his back catalogue of music from Bruford, Moraz/Bruford, and Earthworks were made available on digital streaming platforms for the first time. In January 2022, Bruford launched his own YouTube channel to share videos from his career with additional "thoughts and anecdotes". Later in 2022, a 6-CD career-spanning box set of tracks which he had played on was released, entitled Making a Song and Dance: A Complete-Career Collection. This was followed by a 3-CD archival set, The Best of Bill Bruford – The Winterfold & Summerfold Years, in October 2024.

=== 2022–present: Return to music ===
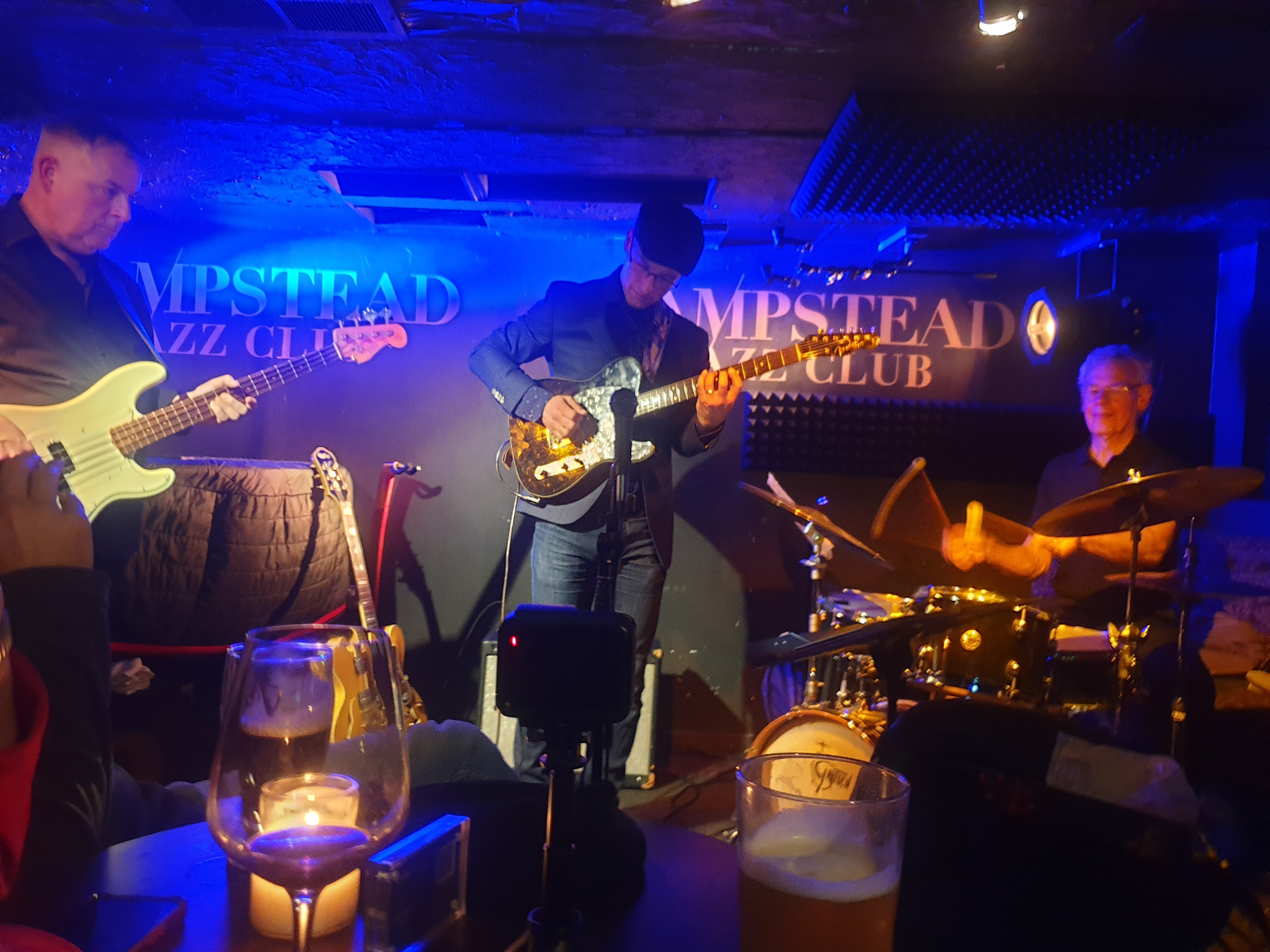
The Pete Roth Trio performing at the Hampstead Jazz Club on 1 November 2024. From left to right are Mike Pratt (bass), Pete Roth (guitar) and Bill Bruford (drums).

In 2022, Bruford ended his retirement to join the Pete Roth Trio, a jazz group led by guitarist Pete Roth who was his former drum technician over 20 years prior. Bruford described his return to drumming as "explosive, unexpected, and very sudden. I remember passing someone else's kit one day, sitting down, and feeling exhilarated all over, urgently and violently keen to start all over again." The band began playing small venues mostly in the south-east of England, but moved to international dates, touring through 2025-6. A live album, Group Chat, followed in October 2026.

On 3 August 2023, Bruford made an unannounced appearance at the John Wetton tribute concert in East Sussex, playing a live run-through of Bryan Ferry's cover of "Let's Stick Together", which Wetton had played on, with Phil Manzanera, Guy Pratt, and Chris Difford.

== Band timeline ==
- Yes (1968–1972, 1991–1992)
- King Crimson (1972–1974, 1981–1984, 1994–1997)
- Gong (November – December 1974)
- National Health (1975–1977)
- Trigger (Roy Harper Band) (1975)
- Genesis (as concert drummer on A Trick of the Tail Tour, 1976)
- Absolute Elsewhere (1976)
- Bruford (1977–1980)
- U.K. (1978)
- Bill Bruford's Earthworks (Mark I: 1986–1993, Mark II: 1997–2008)
- Anderson Bruford Wakeman Howe (1988–1990)
- ProjeKct One (1997)
- Network of Sparks (1999)
- Bruford Levin Upper Extremities (1998–2000)
- Pete Roth Trio (2022–present)

== Personal life ==
Bruford married his wife Carolyn in March 1973; they live in Surrey. They have three children, including Alex, who was the drummer of the indie rock band Infadels.

At Bruford's wedding reception, Jon Anderson met Jamie Muir, who inspired Anderson to read Autobiography of a Yogi which became the origin of Yes's double album Tales from Topographic Oceans (1973).

Bruford described himself as a "lapsed atheist".

== Songwriting ==
When interviewed in 1982, Bruford commented on his ability to compose for King Crimson. "It's very hard to know how to communicate in a band like that where the individuals are competent enough to produce their own kinds of sounds, it's very hard to write for a band like that."

== Legacy ==
Many other drummers have cited Bruford as an influence, including Danny Carey, Mike Portnoy, Matt Cameron, Brann Dailor, Tim "Herb" Alexander, Gene Hoglan, Aaron Harris, Chad Cromwell, Ben Koller, Chris Pennie, Steve Arrington, Mac McNeilly, Morgan Simpson, Eric Kretz, and Martin Dosh. In addition, other artists have been quoted expressing admiration for his work including Neil Murray, Jimmy Keegan, and Adrian Younge.

== Awards ==
In 1990, the readers of Modern Drummer voted him into that magazine's Hall of Fame.

== Books ==
- Bill Bruford: The Autobiography. Yes, King Crimson, Earthworks and More (2009)
- Uncharted: Creativity and the Expert Drummer (2018)

== Discography ==
=== As band leader ===
Bruford

- Feels Good to Me (1978)
- One of a Kind (1979)
- The Bruford Tapes (1979, live recording)
- Gradually Going Tornado (1980)
- Rock Goes to College (2006, live recording)

Bill Bruford's Earthworks

- Earthworks (1987)
- Dig? (1989)
- All Heaven Broke Loose (1991)
- Stamping Ground: Bill Bruford's Earthworks Live (1994, live recording)
- Heavenly Bodies (1997)
- A Part, and Yet Apart (1999)
- The Sound of Surprise (2001)
- Footloose and Fancy Free (2002, live recording)
- Random Acts of Happiness (2004, live recording)
- Earthworks Underground Orchestra (2006, live recording)

Bill Bruford with Ralph Towner and Eddie Gomez

- If Summer Had Its Ghosts (1997)

Compilations

- Master Strokes: 1978–1985 (1986)
- Making a Song and Dance: A Complete-Career Collection (2022)
- The Best of Bill Bruford – The Winterfold & Summerfold Years (2024)

=== As co-leader ===
Anderson Bruford Wakeman Howe

- Anderson Bruford Wakeman Howe (1989)
- An Evening of Yes Music Plus (1993)
- Live at the NEC (2012)

Bruford Levin Upper Extremities

- Bruford Levin Upper Extremities (1998)
- B.L.U.E. Nights (2000, live recording)

Moraz/Bruford

- Music for Piano and Drums (1983)
- Flags (1985)
- In Tokyo Live 1985 (2009)
- Live In Maryland 1983 (2012)

Bill Bruford/Michiel Borstlap

- In Concert in Holland (2004, live recording)
- Every Step a Dance, Every Word a Song (2004)
- In Two Minds (2007)

=== As band member ===
Yes

- Yes (1969)
- Time and a Word (1970)
- The Yes Album (1971)
- Fragile (1971)
- Close to the Edge (1972)
- Yessongs (1973, live recording)
- Yesterdays (1975; compilation)
- Union (1991)
- Symphonic Music of Yes (1993)
- Union Live (2011, live recording)

King Crimson

- Larks' Tongues in Aspic (1973)
- Starless and Bible Black (1974)
- Red (1974)
- USA (1975, live recording)
- Discipline (1981)
- Beat (1982)
- Three of a Perfect Pair (1984)
- Absent Lovers (1998, live recording)
- VROOOM (1994)
- THRAK (1995)
- B'Boom: Live in Argentina (1995, live recording)
- THRaKaTTaK (1996, live recording)
- Live at the Jazz Café (1999, live recording as part of The ProjeKcts box set)
- VROOOM VROOOM (2001, live recording)

U.K.

- U.K. (1978)
- Concert Classics, Vol. 4 (1999, re-released as Live in America and Live in Boston)
- Ultimate Collector's Edition (2016)

Pete Lockett's Network of Sparks featuring Bill Bruford

- One (1999)

Pete Roth Trio featuring Bill Bruford

- Group Chat (2026, live recording)

=== Guest appearances ===
- Rick Wakeman – The Six Wives of Henry VIII (1973)
- Chris Squire – Fish Out of Water (1975)
- Steve Howe – Beginnings (1975)
- Roy Harper – HQ (1975)
- Various Artists – Peter and the Wolf (1975)
- Pavlov's Dog – At the Sound of the Bell (1976)
- Absolute Elsewhere – In Search of Ancient Gods (1976)
- Genesis – Three Sides Live (1982; live recording)
- Genesis – Genesis Archive 2: 1976-1992 (2000; live recording)
- Genesis – Seconds Out (1977, live recording)
- Annette Peacock – X-Dreams (1978)
- Steve Howe – The Steve Howe Album (1979)
- The Roches – Keep on Doing (1982)
- Al Di Meola – Scenario (1983)
- Annette Peacock – Been in the Streets Too Long (1983)
- Jamaaladeen Tacuma - Renaissance Man (1984)
- Patrick Moraz – Time Code (1984)
- David Torn – Cloud About Mercury (1986)
- Dave Stewart and Barbara Gaskin – Up from the Dark (1986)
- Akira Inoue – Tokyo Installation (1986)
- Anri – Trouble in Paradise (1986)
- The New Percussion Group of Amsterdam, Bill Bruford, and Keiko Abe – Go Between (1987)
- Kazumi Watanabe – The Spice of Life (1987)
- Dave Stewart and Barbara Gaskin – As Far as Dreams Can Go (1988)
- Kazumi Watanabe – The Spice of Life Too (1988)
- Nobuhide Saki - Yume O Yobe (1988)
- David Torn – Door X (1990)
- Steve Howe – Turbulence (1991)
- Joe Hisaishi – Paradise on Earth (1994)
- Tony Levin – World Diary (1995)
- National Health – Missing Pieces (1996)
- Steve Hackett – Genesis Revisited (1996)
- Buddy Rich Big Band – Burning for Buddy: A Tribute to the Music of Buddy Rich, Vol. 2 (1997)
- Gordian Knot – Emergent (2003)
- World Drummers Ensemble – A Coat of Many Colours (2006)
- Piano Circus – Skin and Wire, The Music of Colin Riley (2009)
- Leon Alvarado – Strangers in Strange Places (2010)

== Notes ==
Footnotes

Citations

Sources

- Bruford, Bill (2009). Bill Bruford: The Autobiography. Yes, King Crimson, Earthworks and More. Jawbone Press. ISBN 978-1906002237.
- Hedges, Dan (1982). Yes: An Authorized Biography. Sidgwick & Jackson. ISBN 978-0-283-98751-9.
- Morse, Tim (1996). Yesstories: "Yes" in Their Own Words. St Martin's Press. ISBN 978-0-312-14453-1.
- Welch, Chris (2008). Close to the Edge – The Story of Yes. Omnibus Press. ISBN 978-1-84772-132-7.
