= Pete Roth Trio =

British jazz group

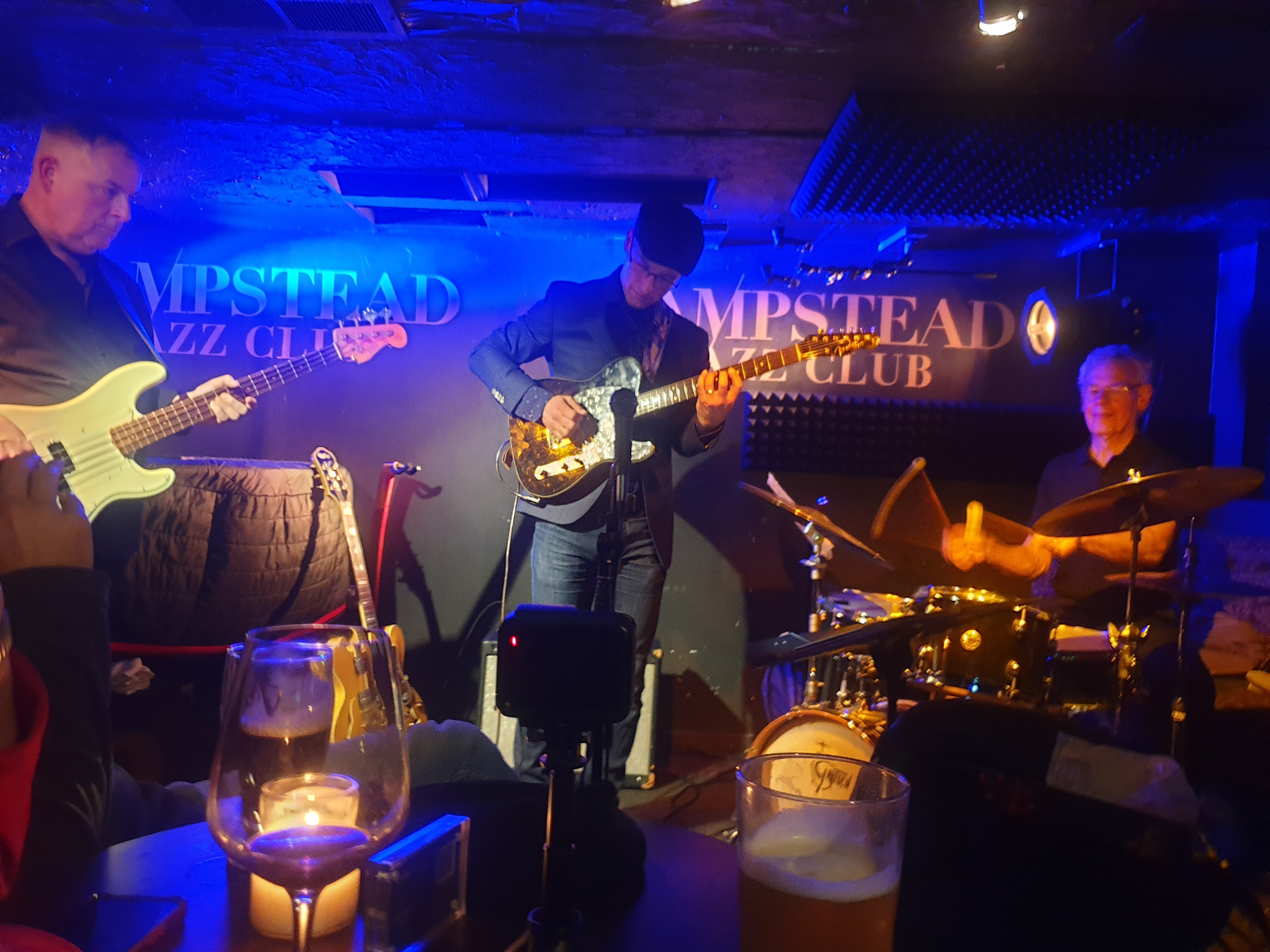
- The Trio in 2024. From left: Mike Pratt, Pete Roth and Bill Bruford

Background information
- Origin: United Kingdom
- Genre: Jazz
- Years active: 2022–present
- Members: Bill Bruford; Pete Roth; Mike Pratt
- Website: peterothtrio.com

The Pete Roth Trio are a British jazz music group formed in 2022. They are a guitar jazz trio with guitarist Pete Roth, bassist Mike Pratt and drummer Bill Bruford (formerly of Yes and King Crimson). They are sometimes billed as the Pete Roth Trio featuring Bill Bruford.

== History ==
Bill Bruford had retired from performing for 13 years, when he got the urge to start drumming again. He approached German-born guitarist Pete Roth, who lived locally to Bruford. Roth had been a student of Bruford's and then a drum tech and road manager for Bruford's Earthworks band 20 years earlier. They started rehearsing together. Roth suggested Mike Pratt on bass, leading to a trio, initially acoustic but soon moving to electric guitar and bass. The band then started playing for audiences. They played a live show in February 2024, then started touring from September 2024. They currently tour internationally, and have played dates in Europe and Japan.

Sets in 2025 included "Billie's Bounce", "Summertime", and an interpretation of Dvořák's "New World Symphony".

A live album with DVD, Group Chat, was released 11 September 2026.
