= One of a Kind (Bruford album) =

Studio album by Bruford
- Released: June 1979
- Recorded: January–February 1979
- Studios: Trident Studios, London
- Genre: Jazz rock
- Length: 46:28
- Label: EG/Polydor
- Producer: Bill Bruford

Bruford chronology
Feels Good to Me (1978)	One of a Kind (1979)	The Bruford Tapes (1979)

Singles from One of a Kind
- 1. "Hell's Bells" Released: 18 April 1980

One of a Kind is the second solo album by the drummer Bill Bruford, and the first proper album by his band Bruford. Released in 1979 on EG Records, it is a collection of instrumentals in a style that can loosely be defined as jazz rock. Bruford features guitarist Allan Holdsworth, bassist Jeff Berlin, and keyboardist Dave Stewart. "Forever Until Sunday" and "The Sahara of Snow" had originally been performed at 1978 concerts by Bruford and Holdsworth’s previous band U.K. They were intended for a studio album, but were never properly recorded by U.K. as Bruford kept the pieces for himself when he and Holdsworth exited the band. U.K. bandmate Eddie Jobson co-wrote "The Sahara of Snow" and reprises his violin part on "Forever Until Sunday". Stewart's "Hell's Bells" utilizes a fragment penned by his former National Health colleague Alan Gowen (the 3-chord pattern underlying the guitar solo). Holdsworth's "The Abingdon Chasp" is the only piece he wrote for Bruford.

== Reception ==
Professional ratings
Review scores
Source	Rating
AllMusic	4.5/5 stars
The Penguin Guide to Jazz	3/4 stars
DownBeat	4/5 stars

In a review for AllMusic, Dave Connolly wrote: "Good-humored twists and turns abound in the music... Those who enjoy their fusion with a healthy dose of rock will find One of a Kind a fair match for anything from Return to Forever or Brand X."

The authors of The Penguin Guide to Jazz Recordings called the music "strongly melodic, freewheeling and built round Bruford's ringing percussion."

John Kelman of All About Jazz praised the "firmly-cemented group sound, and... consistent set of compositions," and commented: "The same characteristics found on Feels Good to Me are evident on One of a Kind, with everyone demonstrating palpable growth... the magic of One of a Kind is that it remains compelling and accessible... Solos flow organically throughout the long-form compositions, integrated in ways that makes them feel a part of the larger whole."

Exposé Online's Jeff Melton stated: "From the get-go, this collection of ten tracks stands as a maelstrom of chops, arranging skills and inspired ensemble playing... the dynamics between drums, keys and fretless bass provide a high profile, capable structure for Holdsworth's top-flight soloing ability."

In an article for Sounds of Surprise, Matt Phillips wrote: "it's music that breathes... played by empathetic, truly virtuosic musicians. But is it rock, jazz, prog or fusion? Who knows, but it's some of the greatest British instrumental music of all time."

== Track listing ==
All tracks are written by Bill Bruford, unless otherwise noted.

Side one
No.	Title	Writer(s)	Length
1.	"Hell's Bells"	Dave Stewart; Alan Gowen	3:32
2.	"One of a Kind, Pt. 1"		2:20
3.	"One of a Kind, Pt. 2"	Bruford; Stewart	4:00
4.	"Travels with Myself – And Someone Else"		6:10
5.	"Fainting in Coils"		6:33
Total length:			22:35

Side two
No.	Title	Writer(s)	Length
1.	"Five G"	Jeff Berlin; Bruford; Stewart	4:41
2.	"The Abingdon Chasp"	Allan Holdsworth	4:50
3.	"Forever Until Sunday"		5:46
4.	"The Sahara of Snow, Pt. 1"		5:18
5.	"The Sahara of Snow, Pt. 2"	Bruford; Eddie Jobson	3:23
Total length:			23:58

2005 remaster bonus track
No.	Title	Writer(s)	Length
11.	"Manacles" (live 1979)	Bruford; Stewart	7:25
Total length:			7:25

== Personnel ==
- Allan Holdsworth – electric guitar, acoustic guitar (midsection of "The Abingdon Chasp")
- Dave Stewart – keyboards, synthesizers, electronics
- Jeff Berlin – bass guitar
- Bill Bruford – drums & percussions, voice of the Mock Turtle (intro to "Fainting in Coils")

with

- Eddie Jobson – violin ("Forever Until Sunday")
- Anthea Norman Taylor – voice of Alice (intro to "Fainting in Coils")
- Sam Alder – narrator (intro to "Fainting in Coils")
- John Clark – electric guitar ("Manacles")

=== Production ===
- Alwyn Clayden – art direction, design
- Sheila Rock – photography
- John Shaw – photography
- Stephen W Tayler – engineer, production assistant
