= Music for Piano and Drums =

Studio album by Moraz and Bruford
- Released: 1983
- Recorded: October 1983
- Studios: Gallery Studios, Chertsey, Surrey, England
- Genres: Jazz; progressive rock; free improvisation
- Length: 43:23
- Label: E.G. Records CD issued by Winterfold Records
- Producers: Bill Bruford, Patrick Moraz

Moraz and Bruford chronology
| Music for Piano and Drums (1983) | Flags (1985) |

Music for Piano and Drums is the first studio album by a duo consisting of Swiss keyboardist Patrick Moraz and English drummer Bill Bruford. Both were members of Yes at different times (Bruford from 1968- 1972 and Moraz from 1974-1977), and the two had played together on Yes bassist Chris Squire's solo album Fish Out of Water in 1975.

The album was recorded while Moraz was in The Moody Blues and Bruford was in King Crimson. As the album title suggests, the album features eight instrumentals performed on grand piano and acoustic drum kit (Bruford was known for playing electric drums at this time). After touring briefly to support the album, Moraz & Bruford recorded a second album two years later, Flags.

== Reception ==
Professional ratings
Review scores
| Source | Rating |
|---|---|
| AllMusic | 3/5 stars |
| The Penguin Guide to Jazz | 2.5/4 stars |

The Penguin Guide to Jazz Recordings says of both Music for Piano and Drums and Flags: "There are one or two alarming moments when one might be listening to The Carpenters jamming at home. Then it's Stravinsky; then..."

Bill Milkowski of JazzTimes stated: "The most daring tracks are the two improv pieces: 'Living Space' showcases Bruford's deft touch with brushes in an engaging dialogue with Moraz, and the frantically swinging 'Any Suggestions' has Bruford keeping a steady boppish pulse on the ride cymbal while matching Moraz's rapid-fire keyboard runs with Max Roach-like snare and tom-tom statements."

Writing for All About Jazz, John Kelman commented: "Albums like this always tend to challenge the preconception that there has to be a fuller ensemble. Stark and spacious at times, equally rich and full at others, Moraz and Bruford create a broad tapestry with only two instruments that, considering their primary occupations at the time, must have come as quite a surprise to many of their fans."

== Track listing ==
1. "Children's Concerto" (Moraz) - 4:54
2. "Living Space" (Moraz, Bruford) - 3:53
3. "Any Suggestions" (Moraz, Bruford) - 5:39
4. "Eastern Sundays" (Moraz) - 6:48
5. "Blue Brains" (Moraz) - 4:49
6. "Symmetry" (Moraz) - 3:42
7. "Galatea" (Moraz) - 5:22
8. "Hazy" (Moraz) - 6:25

== Personnel ==
- Patrick Moraz – grand piano
- Bill Bruford – acoustic drums

Technical

- Barry Radman - recording engineer
- Geoff Halpin, Jon Barraclough - sleeve design
- Ralph Augsburger - cover painting
