= The Spice of Life (Kazumi Watanabe album) =

Studio album by Kazumi Watanabe
- Released: 1987
- Genre: Jazz fusion
- Label: PolyGram

Kazumi Watanabe chronology
Mobo Splash (1985)	The Spice of Life (1987)	The Spice of Life Too (1988)

Professional ratings
Review scores
Source	Rating
Allmusic	4.5/5 stars

The Spice of Life is an album by jazz fusion guitarist Kazumi Watanabe, with Jeff Berlin on bass and Bill Bruford on drums. It was originally released in 1987, under the PolyGram label.

== Track listing ==
1. "Melanchoe" – 3:29
2. "Hiper K" – 5:38
3. "City" – 4:28
4. "Period" – 6:38
5. "Unt" – 5:48
6. "Na Starovia" – 4:43
7. "Lim-Poo" – 4:50
8. "J.F.K." – 4:55
9. "Rage In" - 6:19 (bonus track for re-issue in 2004)

== The Spice of Life in Concert DVD ==
In 2004 a DVD was distributed by Geneon of a concert that took place on May 22, 1987, entitled "The Spice of Life in Concert". It features a 12 piece concert, and has an interview of Kazumi Watanabe. In addition to the original 8 tracks on "The Spice of Life", it includes a drum solo by Bill Bruford, a bass solo by Jeff Berlin, "Sayonara" (from the 1980 album To Chi Ka) and "Half Blood" (from the 1983 album Mobo). (Originally, in 1987, a LD was distributed in Japan, but it went out of print quickly.)

=== Track listing ===
1. "Melanchoe"
2. "Hiper K"
3. "City"
4. "Period"
5. "Na Starovia"
6. "Bass solo"
7. "Sayonara"
8. "Half Blood"
9. "Lim-Poo"
10. "Drums solo"
11. "J.F.K."
12. "Unt"

== Personnel ==
- Kazumi Watanabe – guitar, main performer
- Jeff Berlin – electric bass
- Bill Bruford – electric drums

Recorded and Mixed by Adam Moseley
