= Gradually Going Tornado =

Studio album by Bruford
- Released: 15 February 1980
- Recorded: October & November 1979
- Studios: Surrey Sound Studios, Surrey, England
- Genres: Jazz fusion, progressive rock
- Length: 46:02
- Label: Polydor Records
- Producers: Bill Bruford; Ron Malo

Bruford chronology
The Bruford Tapes (1979)	Gradually Going Tornado (1980)

Gradually Going Tornado is the third and final studio album by Bruford. It was co-produced by Bruford and Ron Malo, the latter known from his work with Weather Report. The music on the album leans closer to progressive rock than the jazz fusion oriented sound of the band’s previous albums. More of Bruford's lyrics are featured as well, for the first time sung by bassist Jeff Berlin. "Land's End" incorporates music keyboardist Dave Stewart had previously composed for the National Health album Of Queues and Cures (1978). Guitarist Allan Holdsworth left the group before recording began, and recommended John Clark as his replacement. Clark was listed as “the Unknown John Clark” on the album sleeve as part of a running joke highlighting his obscurity in comparison to Holdsworth.

The title of the album was taken from the British-based Romanian artist Paul Neagu who did a performance under the name "Gradually Going Tornado" in London in 1974. Neagu created the album's cover art.

== Reception ==
Professional ratings
Review scores
Source	Rating
AllMusic	3.5/5 stars
The Penguin Guide to Jazz	2.5/4 stars

In a review for AllMusic, Lee Bloom wrote: "This is intelligent fusion -- intricately crafted, high energy, and technically impressive... Gradually Going Tornado, if not Bruford's most successful effort, is certainly among the finest music produced in the progressive rock/fusion genre."

The authors of The Penguin Guide to Jazz Recordings called the music "strongly melodic, freewheeling and built round Bruford's ringing percussion."

John Kelman of All About Jazz commented: "The Bruford Tapes demonstrated a more raucous energy than Bruford's first two releases, but the follow-up studio album, Gradually Going Tornado, proved that the group was capable of generating the same kind of power in the studio."

== Track listing ==
Side one
No.	Title	Writer(s)	Length
1.	"Age Of Information"	Bill Bruford, Dave Stewart	4:41
2.	"Gothic 17"	Bruford, Stewart	5:07
3.	"Joe Frazier"	Jeff Berlin	4:41
4.	"Q.E.D."	Bruford, Stewart	7:46

Side two
No.	Title	Writer(s)	Length
5.	"The Sliding Floor"	Bruford, Stewart, Berlin	4:58
6.	"Palewell Park"	Bruford	3:57
7.	"Plans For J.D."	Bruford	3:50
8.	"Land's End"	Stewart	10:20

2005 remaster bonus track
No.	Title	Writer(s)	Length
9.	"5g" (Live)	Bruford, Stewart, Berlin	7:21

== Personnel ==
- Dave Stewart – keyboards, synthesizers
- John Clark – electric guitar
- Jeff Berlin – bass guitar, lead vocals
- Bill Bruford – drums

Guests:

- Georgie Born – cello (“Gothic 17”)
- Amanda Parsons, Barbara Gaskin – backing vocals (“Land’s End”)

Technical:

- Ron Malo – co-producer, engineer
- Pete Buhlman – engineer, tape operator
- Martin Moss – engineer, second engineer
- Paul Neagu – art direction, design

== Charts ==
Album - Billboard (United States)

Year	Chart	Position
1980	Pop Albums	191
