= Jeff Berlin =

American jazz fusion bassist (born 1953)

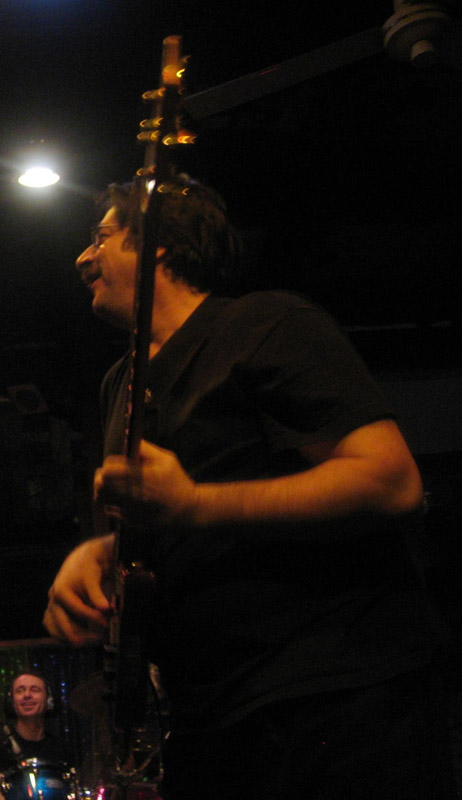
- Berlin performing in 2007

Background information
- Born: Jeffrey Arthur Berlin; January 17, 1953 (age 73); Queens, New York, U.S.
- Genres: Jazz rock progressive rock
- Occupation: Musician
- Instruments: Bass, vocals
- Years active: 1970 — Present
- Labels: Denon, Rock Empire, Random Act

Jeffrey Arthur Berlin (born January 17, 1953) is an American jazz rock bassist and composer. He first came to prominence in the 1970s as a member of the band Bruford, led by drummer Bill Bruford.

== Musical career ==
Berlin was born on January 17, 1953, in Queens, New York. He studied violin from 5 until 15 years of age, when he was inspired to play bass guitar after seeing the Beatles. He attended Berklee College of Music to study bass. He was influenced by Jack Bruce, Paul McCartney, Tim Bogert, and Jack Casady early on, and later by Rocco Prestia and Jaco Pastorius.

After session work with Patrick Moraz, David Liebman and Patti Austin, he gained widespread international attention in 1977 when British musician Bill Bruford handpicked him for his debut album Feels Good to Me. He played in Bruford's namesake band until 1980. His Bruford bandmate Allan Holdsworth employed Berlin for his 1983 Warner Brothers album Road Games.

Berlin continued to record and tour throughout the 1980s, 1990s and 2000s.

== Style and appreciation ==
In a review for Berlin's album Low Standards, Bass Musician Magazine said: "Anytime I mention [Jeff Berlin], there seems to be a ripple in the force and the wave of Berlin supporters or antagonists come to the surface and spout-off their opinions. No matter where you stand regarding Jeff's musical philosophy, no one can reasonably deny the simple fact that Jeff seriously knows his craft and is one of the major players of our time."

Berlin's melodic, lead-bass playing style was heavily influenced by that of Jaco Pastorius; despite this, Berlin has repeatedly stated his distaste for Jaco imitators.

== Personal life ==
On August 30, 2013, Berlin married Gabriela Sinagra, a jazz singer and vocal coach from Rosario, Argentina.

== Discography ==
=== Solo ===
- 1985 Champion (Passport Jazz)
- 1986 Pump It! (Passport Jazz)
- 1997 Taking Notes (Denon)
- 1998 Crossroads (Denon)
- 2000 Star Licks Master Sessions: Jeff Berlin (Star Licks Productions) (VHS)
- 2000 In Harmony's Way (M.A.J. Records, multiple re-releases)
- 2004 Lumpy Jazz (M.A.J.)
- 2006 Aneurythms/Ace of Bass (M.A.J.)
- 2006 Mel Bay Jeff Berlin-Bass Logic from the Players School of Music (Mel Bay Publications) (DVD)
- 2010 High Standards (King Japan / M.A.J.)
- 2013 Low Standards (Random Act)
- 2022 Jack Songs (Jeff Berlin Music Group)

=== As sideman ===
- 1976 Patrick Moraz – The Story of I (Charisma (UK), Atlantic (US/Canada), Voiceprint (reissue))
- 1976 Esther Phillips – Capricorn Princess
- 1976 Patti Austin – End of a Rainbow (CTI)
- 1976 David Matthews with Whirlwind - Shoogie Wanna Boogie (CTI)
- 1977 Ray Barretto – Eye of the Beholder (Atlantic)
- 1977 David Liebman – Light'n Up, Please! (A&M)
- 1977 Ernie Krivda – Satanic (Inner City)
- 1977 Bruford – Feels Good to Me
- 1978 Don Pullen – Montreux Concert (Atlantic)
- 1979 David Sancious – Just As I Thought
- 1979 Bruford – One of a Kind (Winterfold)
- 1980 Bruford – Gradually Going Tornado (Winterfold)
- 1980 Passport - Lifelike
- 1980 Joe Diorio – 20th Century Impressions
- 1981 Bruford – The Bruford Tapes (Winterfold)
- 1981 Herbie Mann – Mellow
- 1983 Allan Holdsworth – Road Games
- 1983 Janis Ian – Uncle Wonderful
- 1984 Clare Fischer and Salsa Picante – Crazy Bird
- 1985 Shumate-Reno Jazz Quintet – Hurricane
- 1986 Bruford - Master Strokes: 1978–1985
- 1986 T Lavitz – Storytime
- 1987 Henderson-Berlin-Smith-Lavitz – Players
- 1987 Kazumi Watanabe – The Spice of Life
- 1988 Kazumi Watanabe – The Spice of Life Too
- 1993 k.d. lang – Even Cowgirls Get the Blues
- 1993 Anderson Bruford Wakeman Howe – An Evening of Yes Music Plus
- 1994 Nathan Cavaleri Band – Nathan
- 1995 Richie Kotzen – The Inner Galactic Fusion Experience
- 1995 Michael Zentner – Playtime
- 2002 Novecento – Featuring...
- 2006 Chambers - Jeff Berlin-Fiuczynski-Lavitz – Boston T Party
- 2006 Bruford – Rock goes to College - (2006 DVD Winterfold Records)
- 2012 Henderson-Berlin-Chambers – HBC (Tone Center)
- 2013 Nick Miller – My Memories
