= Flags (Moraz and Bruford album) =

Studio album by Moraz-Bruford
- Released: 14 June 1985
- Recorded: January 1985
- Studios: Aquarius Studios, Geneva
- Genre: Progressive rock
- Length: 38:11
- Label: E.G.
- Producers: Bill Bruford, Patrick Moraz

Moraz-Bruford chronology
Music for Piano and Drums (1983)	Flags (1985)	Live in Tokyo (2009)

Flags is a 1985 album by the duo of keyboardist Patrick Moraz and drummer Bill Bruford. Unlike their debut Music for Piano and Drums, which featured only the two instruments in the album's title, this recording expanded their musical palette by incorporating Kurzweil 250 synthesizer and Simmons electronic percussion. During the recording of this album, Moraz was a member of The Moody Blues, while Bruford's band King Crimson had just begun a hiatus that would last for ten years. Flags features ten original instrumentals, mostly derived from the duo improvising or working with sketches. There is also a drum solo Bruford based on Max Roach's "The Drum Also Waltzes".

== Background and recording ==
Reflecting on the cover of Max Roach's "The Drum Also Waltzes", Bill Bruford remarked, "Being largely improvised and afro-centric, 'The Drum Also Waltzes' was not slavishly constrained by an original text or chart. It was open enough for other drummers to make their drums also waltz. So I didn't notate and then regurgitate Roach's version of events. I played as much of the original as seemed necessary, before my improvisations, which were unlike Roach's."

== Reception ==
Professional ratings
Review scores
Source	Rating
AllMusic	3/5 stars
The Penguin Guide to Jazz	3/4 stars

The Penguin Guide to Jazz Recordings says of both Flags and Music for Piano and Drums: "There are one or two alarming moments when one might be listening to The Carpenters jamming at home. Then it's Stravinsky; then..."

In an article for Jazz Times, Bill Milkowski called the album "an overproduced studio outing," and wrote: "The album opens on a decidedly sour note with the bombastic, overproduced 'Temples of Joy,' which sounds like the theme to an '80s sitcom. Moraz's classical/prog-rock pretensions spill over on other schlocky numbers" including "the grandiose title track."

Writing for All About Jazz, John Kelman noted that "the chemistry between the two is clearly evident," and commented: "more ambitious than Music for Piano and Drums from a production perspective, Flags is clearly a completely different record, based more on overt structure and through-composition that manages to demonstrate the potential power of the duo.

== Track listing ==
1. "Temples of Joy" (Moraz) - 4:51
2. "Split Seconds" (Moraz, Bruford) - 4:37
3. "Karu" (Moraz) - 3:45
4. "Impromptu Too!" (Moraz) - 3:30
5. "Flags" (Moraz) - 4:27
6. "Machines Programmed by Genes" (Moraz, Bruford) - 5:13
7. "The Drum Also Waltzes" (Max Roach) - 2:51
8. "Infra Dig" (Moraz, Bruford) - 3:12
9. "A Way with Words" (Moraz, Bruford) - 1:36
10. "Everything You've Heard Is True" (Moraz, Bruford) - 6:09

== Personnel ==
- Patrick Moraz – grand piano, synthesizer, claves on "The Drum Also Waltzes", electronics
- Bill Bruford – acoustic and electric drums, percussions

Technical

- Jean Ristori, Barry Radman – engineer
- Rob O'Connor – design, art direction
- Gered Mankowitz – photography
