= Kazumi Watanabe =

Japanese jazz fusion guitarist (born 1953)

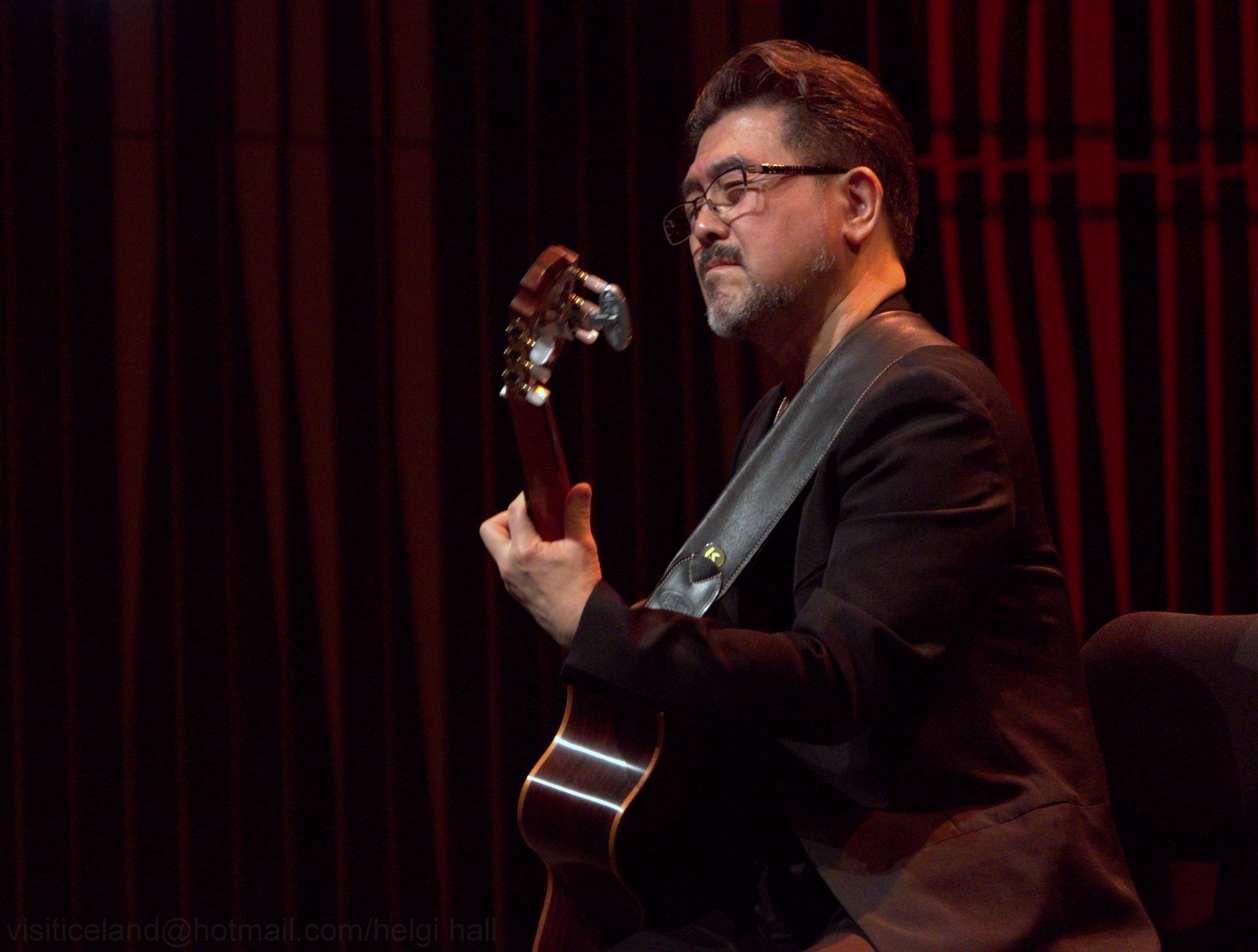
- Watanabe performing in 2011

Background information
- Born: October 14, 1953 (age 73); Tokyo, Japan
- Genres: Jazz, jazz fusion
- Occupations: Musician, composer
- Instrument: Guitar
- Years active: 1969–present
- Labels: Columbia, Denon, Gramavision, Warner
- Website: www.kazumiwatanabe.net

Kazumi Watanabe (Japanese: 渡辺 香津美, Hepburn: Watanabe Kazumi; born October 14, 1953 in Tokyo) is a Japanese guitarist. Other guitarists such as Luke Takamura and Sugizo have cited him as an influence.

== Career ==
Watanabe learned guitar at the age of 12 from Sadanori Nakamure at the Yamaha Music School in Tokyo. He released his first album in 1971. In 1979, he formed a jazz rock band with some of Japan's leading studio musicians, and recorded the album Kylyn. During that year, he toured with the pop band Yellow Magic Orchestra.

In the 1980s, he toured as guest soloist with Steps, the Brecker Brothers, and Word of Mouth, led by Jaco Pastorius. Watanabe created the jazz-rock/jazz-fusion band Mobo in 1983 with Mitsuru Sawamura (saxophone), Ichiko Hashimoto (piano), Gregg Lee (bass), Shuichi Murakami (drums), and Kiyohiko Senba.

During the eighties Watanabe released the jazz-rock albums To Chi Ka (1980), Mobo Club (1983), Mobo Splash (1985), and Spice of Life (1987). A DVD was issued from the tour which featured drummer Bill Bruford and bassist Jeff Berlin, who also played on the record.

In the 1990s Kazumi assembled an all-Japanese line-up called Resonance Vox (Vagabonde Suzuki on bass, Rikiya Higashihara on drums, Yahiro Tomohiro on percussion). This band has released several adventurous fusion albums.

On February 27, 2024, he collapsed at his home in Karuizawa and was transported by ambulance. On March 31 of the same year, as a result of scrutiny, it was reported on the official website that he was diagnosed with cerebral stem hemorrhage with impaired consciousness and that he was hospitalized, and that he would cancel all artist activities scheduled for this year based on the doctor's diagnosis and concentrate on treatment.

== Discography ==
=== As leader ===
- Infinite (Express, 1971)
- Endless Way (Columbia, 1975)
- Monday Blues (RCA, 1976)
- Milky Shade (Union, 1976)
- Olive's Step (Better Days, 1977)
- Guitar Work Shop (Flying Dog, 1977)
- Lonesome Cat (Denon, 1978)
- Kaleidoscope (Denon, 1978)
- Mermaid Boulevard (Alfa, 1978)
- Tokyo Joe (Denon, 1978)
- Village in Bubbles (Better Days, 1978)
- Kylyn (Better Days, 1979)
- Kylyn Live (Better Days, 1979)
- To Chi Ka (Better Days, 1980)
- Dogatana (Denon, 1981)
- Mobo (Domo, 1984)
- Mobo I (Gramavision, 1984)
- Mobo II (Gramavision, 1984)
- Mobo Live (Domo, 1985)
- Mobo Splash (Domo, 1985)
- The Spice of Life (Domo, 1987)
- The Spice of Life Too (Gramavision, 1988)
- Kilowatt (Gramavision, 1989)
- Romanesque (Domo, 1990)
- Pandora (Polydor, 1991)
- O-X-O (Domo, 1992)
- Resonance Vox (Domo, 1993)
- Esprit (Domo, 1996)
- Dandyism (Domo, 1998)
- One for All (EmArcy, 1999)
- Beyond the Infinite (Dozo, 2001)
- Guitar Renaissance (EWE, 2003)
- Mo' Bop II (East Works, 2004)
- Guitar Renaissance II (EWE, 2005)
- Guitar Renaissance III (EWE, 2006)
- Kaihogen (Cube, 2006)
- Guitar Renaissance IV (EWE, 2007)
- Acoustic Flakes (EWE, 2009)
- Jazz Impression (EWE, 2009)
- Tricoroll (EWE, 2011)
- Mo' Bop III (EWE, 2011)
- Guitar Renaissance V (EWE, 2012)
- Live at Iridium (EWE, 2012)
- Spinning Globe (Warner, 2013)
- En Vivo! (Victor, 2015)
- Gracim (Warner, 2016)
- Lotus Night (Warner, 2016)

=== As sideman ===
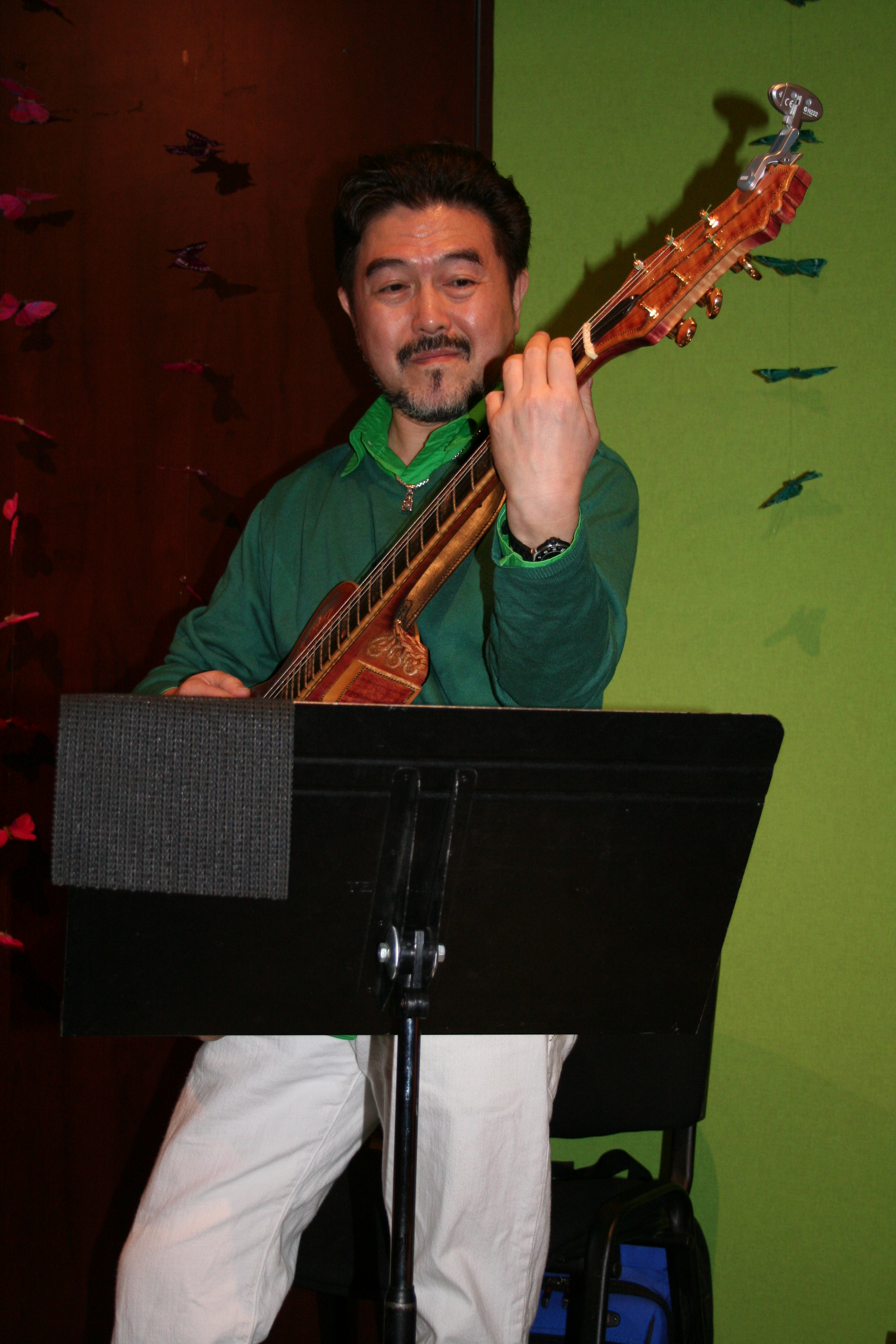
Watanabe performing in 2006

- Jimmy Hopps, Mudari: Spirit of Song (Denon, 1977)
- Hideki Matsutake, Live Space Fantasy (For Life, 1978)
- Jaco Pastorius, Word of Mouth Band 1983 Japan Tour (Rhino, 2012)
