= One for All (Kazumi Watanabe album) =

Live album by Kazumi Watanabe
- Released: 16 June 1999
- Recorded: 31 March 1999, The Bottom Line, New York
- Genre: Jazz, fusion
- Label: Polydor Japan
- Producer: Koko Tanikawa, Kazumi Watanabe

One for All is a 1999 album by Kazumi Watanabe. It was recorded live in New York, at the Bottom Line, on 31 March 1999 between 7:30 PM and 9:30 PM, according to the album's booklet. It features many famous musicians from all over the world such as Akiko Yano, John Patitucci and Larry Coryell.

== Track listing ==
All songs arranged by Watanabe and Tanikawa, except tracks 2 (Yano) and 4 (Mainieri).

1. "Havana" (Koko Tanikawa)
2. "Water Ways Flow Backward Again" (Akiko Yano)
3. "Libertango" (Ástor Piazzolla)
4. "Somewhere" (Leonard Bernstein)
5. "Afro Blue" (Mongo Santamaria)
6. "One for All" (Watanabe)
7. "Milestones" (Miles Davis)

== Personnel ==
- Kazumi Watanabe - guitars
- Mike Mainieri - vibraphone
- John Patitucci - bass
- Larry Coryell - guitar
- Akiko Yano - piano
- Mino Cinelu - drums

=== Additional personnel ===
- Doug Epstein - recording, mixing
- Billy Eric, Tom Filogomo - engineer assistants
- Greg Calbi - mastering
- Toshifumi Kusano - photography
- Yutaka Katayama - artwork director
- Hiromi Saeki - coordination
- Kazuhiko Koike - executive producer
- Mixed at The Warehouse Recording Studio, mastered at Sterling Sound
