= Kilowatt (album) =

Studio album by Kazumi Watanabe
- Released: 1989
- Genre: Jazz fusion
- Length: 51:54
- Label: Gramavision
- Producer: Akira Yada

Kazumi Watanabe chronology
The Spice of Life Too (1988)	Kilowatt (1989)	Romanesque (1990)

Professional ratings
Review scores
Source	Rating
Allmusic	2.5/5 stars

Kilowatt is an album by jazz fusion guitarist Kazumi Watanabe, originally released on audio cassette in 1989. In 1991 it was released again on cassette, CD and LP.

== Track listing ==
All tracks by Kazumi Watanabe except where noted.

1. "1000 Mega" - 4:58
2. "Capri" - 4:10
3. "No One" (Watanabe/Brunel) - 5:33
4. "Jive" (Watanabe/Brunel) - 3:48
5. "Papyrus" - 4:50
6. "Sunspin" - 5:15
7. "Pretty Soon" (Brunel) - 5:37
8. "Bernard" (Brunel) - 4:42
9. "Dolphin Dance" (Herbie Hancock) - 6:59
10. "Good Night Machines" (Watanabe/Moraz/Brunel) - 6:18

== Personnel ==
- Kazumi Watanabe - guitars, synth guitars, keyboards
- Bunny Brunel - bass, synth bass, keyboards
- John Wackerman - drums, synth drums, electric vibes

=== Additional Musicians ===
- Wayne Shorter - sax (2, 8)
- Patrick Moraz - keyboards (1, 2, 4, 8, 10)
- Alex Acuna - percussion (2, 3, 4, 5, 7, 8)
