= Mo' Bop II =

Studio album by Kazumi Watanabe
- Released: 2004
- Recorded: 2004
- Genre: Fusion
- Label: East Works Entertainment

Mo' Bop II is an album by guitarist Kazumi Watanabe. It was released in 2004 and features only two other members in the lineup, besides Watanabe. The album is part of a project called "New Electric Trio" which began in 2003 with Mo' Bop and continued till 2006 with Mo' Bop III. The album is characterized by a heavy fusion sound.

== Track listing ==
1. "Cleopatra's Dream" 6:08
2. "Blue Spiral" 7:40
3. "Mystic Sand" 5:53
4. "Mosaic Stone" 7:22
5. "Dante’s Point" 10:10
6. "Cry Me A River" 5:06
7. "Death Valley" 8:22
8. "Havana" 3:44
9. "Favor Return of Ensyu Swallow" 5:04

== Personnel ==
- Kazumi Watanabe - guitars
- Richard Bona - electric Fretted and Fretless Bass
- Horacio Hernandez - drums, percussion
