= The Spice of Life Too =

Studio album by Kazumi Watanabe
- Released: 1988
- Recorded: February and March 1988
- Studio: Great Linford Recording Studio, Milton Keynes; Trident II, London, England
- Genre: Jazz fusion
- Length: 41:58
- Label: Gramavision Records
- Producer: Akira Yada

Kazumi Watanabe chronology
The Spice of Life (1987)	The Spice of Life Too (1988)	Kilowatt (1988)

Professional ratings
Review scores
Source	Rating
AllMusic	4.5/5 stars

The Spice of Life Too is an album by jazz fusion guitarist Kazumi Watanabe; featuring Bill Bruford, Jeff Berlin and Peter Vettese. It was released on the Gramavision record label in 1988. The original title released in Japan is "The Spice of Life 2" with a different cover.

== Reception ==
AllMusic awarded the album with 4.5 stars and its review by Paul Kohler states: "A continuation of Spice of Life with stronger compositions and a hint of softer tones, it's very nice!"

== Track listing ==
1. "Andre" (Kazumi Watanabe) – 5:10
2. "We the Planet" (Watanabe) – 5:20
3. "Fu Bu Ki " (Watanabe, Bill Bruford, Jeff Berlin) – 5:10
4. "Rain" (Watanabe) – 4:57
5. "Small Wonder" (Bruford) – 5:05
6. "Concrete Cow" (Watanabe, Berlin) – 5:22
7. "Kaimon" (Watanabe) – 5:35
8. "Men and Angels" ( Bruford) – 5:35

== Personnel ==
- Kazumi Watanabe – guitars
- Bill Bruford – Simmons SDX electronic drums
- Jeff Berlin – bass
- Peter Vettese – keyboards
