= Monday Blues =

Studio album by Kazumi Watanabe
- Released: 1975
- Recorded: October 1974
- Genre: Jazz, fusion
- Length: 36:46
- Label: Ariola Japan; RVL-5502

Kazumi Watanabe chronology
Infinite (1971)	Monday Blues (1975)	Mudari (1976)

Monday Blues is the second album by Japanese guitarist Kazumi Watanabe. The album was released on LP by RCA label of RVC Corporation in 1975.

== Track listing ==
Side A
No.	Title	Music	Length
1.	"Monday Blues"	Kazumi Watanabe	7:59
2.	"A Child Is Born"	Thad Jones	2:09
3.	"Good Vibes"	Hidefumi Toki	8:10
Total length:			18:18

Side B
No.	Title	Music	Length
1.	"On The Horizon"	Kazumi Watanabe	10:30
2.	"'Round Midnight"	Thelonious Monk, Cootie Williams	6:05
3.	"Here's That Rainy Day"	Jimmy Van Heusen	1:53
Total length:			18:28

== Personnel ==
- Kazumi Watanabe – electric guitar
- Hidefumi Toki – alto & soprano saxophone
- Fumio Itabashi – piano
- Tutomu Okada – bass
- Motohiko Hino – drums

== Production ==
- Liner notes – Youzou Iwanami

== Release history ==
Region	Date	Label	Format	Catalog	Note
Japan	1975	RCA	30cmLP	RVL-5502	
Japan	1980	RCA	30cmLP	PG-1505	
Japan	September 21, 1987	BMG JAPAN	12cmCD	R28H-2820	
Japan	November 21, 1997	BMG JAPAN	12cmCD	BVCJ-7423	
Japan	May 23, 2007	BMG JAPAN	12cmCD	BVCJ-37581	Paper Sleeve, K2 24bit Remastered
