= Mermaid Boulevard =

Studio album by Kazumi Watanabe and The Gentle Thoughts
- Released: February 28, 1978
- Recorded: October 17– 29, 1977
- Studio: Studio A, Shibaura, Tokyo
- Genre: Jazz fusion
- Length: 37:38
- Label: Alfa
- Producer: Shunsuke Miyazumi

Kazumi Watanabe chronology
Olive's Step (1977)	Mermaid Boulevard (1978)	Lonesome Cat (1978)

Vinyl cover

Mermaid Boulevard is Kazumi Watanabe's sixth studio album, released in 1978.

== Track listing ==
All tracks are written by Kazumi Watanabe except where noted.

No.	Title	Length
1.	"Mermaid Boulevard"	7:09
2.	"Neptune"	4:03
3.	"Waltz for Sweet"	3:54
4.	"Q" (Louis Johnson, George Johnson)	3:53
5.	"Sugar Loaf Express" (Lee Ritenour)	6:34
6.	"Poppy's Walk"	4:49
7.	"Gentle Afternoon"	4:49

== Personnel ==
- Kazumi Watanabe – guitar, guitar synth
- Ernie Watts – tenor saxophone, flute
- Patrice Rushen – electric piano, clavinet
- Jun Fukamachi – synthesizer, strings arrangement
- Lee Ritenour – guitar, arrangements
- Anthony Jackson – bass guitar
- Harvey Mason – drums
- Steve Forman – percussion
- Minako Yoshida – backing vocals

== Production ==
1. Executive producer – Kunihiko Murai
2. Producer – Shunsuke Miyazumi
3. Engineers – Phil Schier, Norio Yoshizawa
4. Re–mixing Engineer – Phil Schier
5. Assistant engineers – Joan Schier, Yasuhiko Terada, Atsushi Saito
6. Art Direction – Aijiro Wakita
7. Illustration – Koichi Sato
8. Photography – Hiroshi Seo

== Release history ==
Region	Date	Label	Format
Japan	February 28, 1978	Alfa	LP
United States		Inner City	LP
Japan	October 29, 1997	Alfa	CD
