= Feels Good to Me =

Studio album by Bruford
- Released: 6 January 1978
- Recorded: August 1977
- Studios: Trident, London
- Genre: Jazz rock
- Length: 46:58
- Label: EG/Polydor
- Producers: Robin Lumley, Bill Bruford

Bruford chronology
Feels Good to Me (1978)	One of a Kind (1979)

Feels Good to Me is the first solo studio album by former Yes and King Crimson drummer Bill Bruford. The band Bruford grew out of the line-up assembled for this album. The album features guitarist Allan Holdsworth, bassist Jeff Berlin, keyboardist Dave Stewart, and ECM stalwart Kenny Wheeler on fluegelhorn. Bruford also enlisted singer-songwriter Annette Peacock (who performs two of Bruford's lyrics, and contributes one of her own) and Brand X guitarist John Goodsall (who plays rhythm on the title track only). Dave Stewart was a pivotal figure in the music of the Canterbury scene with groups like Egg, Hatfield and the North and National Health, but despite his strong playing (and co-writing) presence, the album does not sound much like the Canterbury bands, and is instead closer to contemporaries Brand X (whose keyboardist Robin Lumley co-produced the album with Bill Bruford).

== Reception ==
Professional ratings
Review scores
Source	Rating
AllMusic	4.5/5 stars
The Penguin Guide to Jazz	3/4 stars

In a retrospective review for AllMusic, Thom Jurek praised the way the performers handled the material, and opined that "Bruford has yet to issue a solo recording as powerful as Feels Good to Me."

The authors of The Penguin Guide to Jazz Recordings stated: "The combination of Kenny Wheeler and Annette Peacock gives Feels Good to Me an obvious cachet, but it's Bruford's torrential drumming with its ringing snare drum sound that makes the record special."

John Kelman of All About Jazz called the album "a landmark recording" due to "the sheer chemistry between the core members," and noted that "the kind of compositional depth and maturity of Feels Good to Me came completely out of left field." He commented: "what is so refreshing about Feels Good to Me is its complete lack of compromise; there's no question that this is the album Bruford wanted to make, and it weathers the test of time incredibly well."

Writing for Progrography, Dave Connolly remarked: "Of the solo Bruford albums, this is the best... Bruford the band is as unique here as the people in it."

Exposé Online's Jon Davis wrote: "These musicians were presenting a completely new way of blending jazz and rock that didn't sound like any of the previous 'fusion' groups... Every single track on the album brings something new to the table... the combination of these players at this moment in time is simply magical."

== Track listing ==
All tracks are written by Bill Bruford, except where noted.

Side one
No.	Title	Writer(s)	Length
1.	"Beelzebub"		3:16
2.	"Back to the Beginning"		7:09
3.	"Seems Like a Lifetime Ago (Part One)"		2:30
4.	"Seems Like a Lifetime Ago (Part Two)"		4:25
5.	"Sample and Hold"	Bruford; Dave Stewart	5:12

Side two
No.	Title	Writer(s)	Length
6.	"Feels Good to Me"		3:49
7.	"Either End of August"		5:27
8.	"If You Can't Stand the Heat..."	Bruford; Stewart	3:20
9.	"Springtime in Siberia"	Bruford; Stewart	2:43
10.	"Adios a la pasada (Goodbye to the Past)"	Bruford; Annette Peacock	7:55

2005 remaster bonus track
No.	Title	Writer(s)	Length
11.	"Joe Frazier" (live)	Jeff Berlin	4:39

== Personnel ==
- Bill Bruford – drums, percussion, vocals (2)
- Allan Holdsworth – electric guitar
- Dave Stewart – keyboards
- Jeff Berlin – bass

with

- Kenny Wheeler – flugelhorn (on tracks 3, 7, 9)
- Annette Peacock – lead vocals (2, 3, 10)
- John Goodsall – rhythm guitar (6)

Production

- Produced by Robin Lumley & Bill Bruford
- Tape operators: John Brand, Colin Green, Stephen Short
- Engineer: Stephen W Tayler
- Equipment technicians: Peter Revill, Mick Rossi
