= Bruford (band) =

British jazz-fusion band

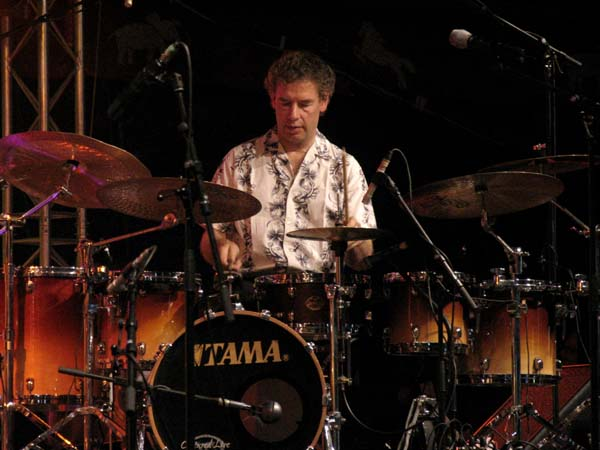
- Band leader Bill Bruford

Background information
- Years active: 1977–1980
- Past members: Bill Bruford; Allan Holdsworth; Annette Peacock; Dave Stewart; Jeff Berlin; John Clark

Bruford were a band assembled and led by British drummer Bill Bruford (former Yes and King Crimson), originating in the late 1970s.

Bill Bruford formed the jazz-fusion band for his debut solo album Feels Good to Me, with keyboardist Dave Stewart (formerly Hatfield and the North), American virtuoso bassist Jeff Berlin and guitarist Allan Holdsworth (formerly Soft Machine and Pierre Moerlen's Gong). This first album also featured Annette Peacock on occasional vocals and British jazz stalwart Kenny Wheeler on flugelhorn. Bruford and Holdsworth then joined the progressive rock group U.K. After Bruford and Holdsworth left U.K., a second album One of a Kind enlisted the same line-up as the first album (minus Peacock and Wheeler) and was all instrumental. On the live album The Bruford Tapes (a show originally broadcast for radio station WLIR), guitarist John Clark (formerly of Quasar) replaced Holdsworth. Clark remained and bassist Berlin sang vocals for the first time on the third album, Gradually Going Tornado, which also featured "Joe Frazier", Berlin's first composition for the group.

Bruford were active at the end of a vibrant decade for fusion music, with groups like Mahavishnu Orchestra, Return to Forever and Brand X getting much attention. Though Bruford followed in the tradition of these bands, the ensemble was unprofitable and were dropped by EG Records in 1980.

A complete boxed set of Bruford recordings was released by Bill Bruford's own Winterfold records label in October 2017. The unreleased material comprises a complete show at London's The Venue and 18 demos for Bruford's intended fourth studio album. These tracks are rough "works in progress" that were never properly finished and recorded when Bruford were dropped by EG Records. The CD remixes were completed by Jakko Jakszyk.

== Band members ==
- Bill Bruford – drums, percussion, vibraphone (1976–1980), piano (1980)
- Jeff Berlin – bass (1976–1980), vocals (1980)
- Dave Stewart – keyboards, piano, synthesizers (1976–1980)
- Allan Holdsworth – guitar (1976–1979; died 2017)
- Annette Peacock – vocals (1977)
- John Clark – guitar (1979–1980)

Timeline

== Discography ==
=== Studio albums ===
- Feels Good to Me (1978 E.G. Records)
- One of a Kind (1979 E.G. Records)
- Gradually Going Tornado (1980 E.G. Records)

=== Live album ===
- The Bruford Tapes (1979 E.G. Records)

=== Compilations ===
- Master Strokes 1978–1985 (1985 E.G. Records)
- Rock goes to College (2006 DVD Winterfold Records)
- Seems Like A Lifetime Ago (2017)
