= Tokyo Joe (album) =

Compilation album by Ryuichi Sakamoto and Kazumi Watanabe
- Released: 1982
- Genre: Electronica, Synthpop, Fusion
- Length: 50:12
- Label: Nippon Columbia (originally), Denon (re-release)

Tokyo Joe is a 1982 compilation album by Ryuichi Sakamoto and guitarist Kazumi Watanabe. It includes tracks from the albums Thousand Knives (1978), Kylyn (1979), Kylyn Live (1979) and the track "Tokyo Joe" which appeared on a various artists anthology Tokyo-Paris-London-New York, Dancing Night. Originally released in Japan in 1982, the album was later re-released also in Western countries during the 1990s.

== Track listing ==
1. "Tokyo Joe" (Bryan Ferry)
2. "The End of Asia" (Ryuichi Sakamoto)
3. "Zai Gvang Dong Shoo Nian" (Akiko Yano)
4. "I'll Be There" (Akiko Yano, Ryuichi Sakamoto)
5. "E-Day Project" (Ryuichi Sakamoto)
6. "Thousand Knives" (Ryuichi Sakamoto)
7. "The River Must Flow" (Gino Vannelli)
8. "Akasaka Moon" (Kazumi Watanabe)

== Personnel ==
- Ryuichi Sakamoto - keyboards, drums, marimba,
- Kazumi Watanabe - guitar, bass, vocals
- Akiko Yano - keyboards, electric piano, vocals, synthesizer
- Ray J. O'Hara - bass
- Haruomi Hosono - cymbal
- Shigeharu Mukai - trombone
- Shuichi Murakami - drums
- Toshiyuki Honda - saxophones
- Yukihiro Takahashi - drums, vocals
- Motoya Hamaguchi - drums
- Shigeya Hamaguchi - percussion
- Yasuaki Shimizu - tenor saxophone
- Ohno Ensemble - strings
- Hideki Matsutake - synthesizer
