= East to Wes =

Studio album by Emily Remler
- Released: May 1988
- Recorded: May 1988
- Studio: Penny Lane Studios, New York
- Genre: Jazz, hard bop
- Length: 50:19
- Label: Concord Jazz
- Producer: Carl E. Jefferson

Emily Remler chronology
Together (1985)	East to Wes (1988)	This Is Me (1990)

East to Wes is a studio album by the jazz guitarist Emily Remler. She was accompanied by the pianist Hank Jones, who had played on Firefly (1981), her first record, the double bass player Buster Williams and the drummer Marvin "Smitty" Smith.

The recording was Remler's tribute to Wes Montgomery. For the liner notes, Nat Hentoff wrote that Remler said about her composition "East to Wes" that it was an "impression of the earlier bossa nova stuff he did. Wes was one of the greater improvisers I ever heard. His feeling was happy, his soul was beautiful."

== Reception ==
Professional ratings
Review scores
Source	Rating
AllMusic	4/5 stars
The Penguin Guide to Jazz	4/4 stars
The Rolling Stone Jazz & Blues Album Guide	4/5 stars
The Virgin Encyclopedia of Jazz	4/5 stars

For the AllMusic reviewer, Ken Dryden, this is a highly recommended recording, considering that "The late guitarist's last CD to be released before her premature death is her finest effort".

In the 9th edition of The Penguin Guide to Jazz Recordings, Richard Cook and Brian Morton awarded the album a full 4 stars, calling it "impeccable" and "the best example of her work." They wrote: "While conceived as a Montgomery homage, Remler's playing actually shows how unlike Wes she really was: harder of tone, her solos more fragmented yet equally lucid."

Critic John Fordham stated that Remler's Wes Montgomery tributes "are as good a tribute to the boss as anyone has come out with, full of that breezily funky swing and singing sound."

Writing for JazzFuel, Matt Fripp commented: "East To Wes may have all the hallmarks of a tribute album, but in reality it used the music of the guitar great as a springboard for her own explorations... Whilst not necessarily her most original work East to Wes is considered by many to be an excellent example of her skills as a guitarist."

Gear Diary's Michael Anderson remarked: "The song selection is great, as are her compositions; but for me the highlight is Remler's playing. Going from Firefly to THIS is simply stunning – she has complete harmonic mastery of the instrument and tosses off complex structures and builds amazing harmonies in every song."

Writer Tom Williams called the album "Remler's most celebrated work," and noted that it "balances tradition with modernity well." He stated: "The technical faculty demonstrated on the album is incredible and, yet, to the author's knowledge, is certainly not widely taught."

== Track listing ==
No.	Title	Length
1.	"Daahoud" (Clifford Brown)	5:16
2.	"Snowfall" (Claude Thornhill)	6:36
3.	"Hot House" (Tad Dameron)	5:41
4.	"Sweet Georgie Fame" (Blossom Dearie - Sandra Harris)	5:36
5.	"Ballad for a Music Box" (Emily Remler)	7:22
6.	"Blues for Herb" (Emily Remler)	6:24
7.	"Softly, as in a Morning Sunrise" (Sigmund Romberg - Oscar Hammerstein II)	8:11
8.	"East to Wes" (Emily Remler)	6:12

== Personnel ==
- Emily Remler – electric guitar (all tracks), Ovation Adamas acoustic guitar (on track #2)
- Hank Jones – piano
- Buster Williams – double bass
- Marvin Smith – drums
