= Take Two (Emily Remler album) =

Studio album by The Emily Remler Quartet
- Released: June 1982
- Recorded: June 1982
- Studio: Soundmixers, New York
- Genre: Jazz, hard bop
- Length: 42:24
- Label: Concord Jazz
- Producer: Carl E. Jefferson

The Emily Remler Quartet chronology
Firefly (1981)	Take Two (1982)	Transitions (1983)

Take Two is the second studio album by jazz guitarist Emily Remler. The record is credited to The Emily Remler Quartet, and Remler was joined on the recording by pianist James Williams, bassist Don Thompson, and drummer Terry Clarke. Williams was best known at the time for his four years with The Jazz Messengers, and Thompson and Clarke frequently worked together as part of the Jim Hall Trio.

Jazz musician and critic Leonard Feather wrote at the liner notes of this album that "Emily Remler has made a swift and admirable advance from promising but uncertain youngster to creative and fast growing professional" and defined Take Two as a "carefully planned and brilliant executed set of performances".

== Reception ==
Professional ratings
Review scores
Source	Rating
AllMusic	4/5 stars
The Rolling Stone Jazz Record Guide	3/5 stars

The AllMusic review by Scott Yanow stated: "Emily Remler's second recording as a leader finds the 24-year-old guitarist still very much playing in the Wes Montgomery vein, although showing her own musical personality here and there".

Gear Diary's Michael Anderson noted that the album "shows some significant growth as an artist, bandleader, composer and guitarist," and commented: "The song 'Waltz for my Grandfather' is gorgeous and a favorite, and her reading of Coltrane's 'Afro Blue' is stellar. For many, THIS was the moment when they really took notice – she was more than just a good young guitarist with promise."

== Track listing ==
No.	Title	Length
1.	"Cannonball" (Cannonball Adderley)	4:48
2.	"In Your Own Sweet Way" (Dave Brubeck)	4:52
3.	"For Regulars Only" (Dexter Gordon)	6:43
4.	"Search For Peace" (McCoy Tyner)	5:17
5.	"Pocket Wes" (Emily Remler)	6:45
6.	"Waltz for my Grandfather" (Emily Remler)	6:35
7.	"Afro Blue" (Mongo Santamaría)	2:24
8.	"Eleuthra" (Monty Alexander)	6:20

== Personnel ==
- Emily Remler – electric guitar
- James Williams – piano
- Don Thompson – bass
- Terry Clarke – drums
