= Catwalk (Emily Remler album) =

Studio album by Emily Remler
- Released: 1985
- Recorded: August 1984
- Studio: Coast Recorders Studios, San Francisco
- Genre: Jazz
- Length: 39:51
- Label: Concord Jazz
- Producer: Carl E. Jefferson

Emily Remler chronology
| Transitions (1983) | Catwalk (1985) | Together (1985) |

Catwalk is an album by guitarist Emily Remler. She was accompanied by John D'earth on trumpet, Eddie Gomez on bass and Bob Moses on drums. The seven compositions were written by Remler.

Jazz critic Nat Hentoff wrote about Emily Remler and her musicians at the liner notes of this album: "She, of course, is hardly the sole reason for how well this album works. Her colleagues are not just casual studio acquaintances. This group has been working together quite a lot, and so these are true conversations, interweaving diverse temperaments and backgrounds into a mosaic full of supple, subtle surprises."

== Reception ==
Professional ratings
Review scores
| Source | Rating |
|---|---|
| AllMusic | 4.5/5 stars |
| The Penguin Guide to Jazz Recordings | 3/4 stars |
| The Rolling Stone Jazz & Blues Album Guide | 3/5 stars |

For the AllMusic reviewer Scott Yanow "Although she never became an innovator, Remler certainly had a lot to offer the jazz world and this fairly adventurous effort was one of the finest recordings of her short career."

Writing for JazzFuel, Matt Fripp called the album "a massive step forwards in her career," and commented: "The first of Remler's releases to feature exclusively original compositions, it showcases a melting pot of influences such as Brazilian music, Indian sounds, Latin and African polyrhythms. The album is certainly eclectic."

Gear Diary's Michael Anderson called the album "excellent," and remarked: "She has found a great voice on the guitar, writes solid songs, and has teamed up with musicians who work well with her and keep things going at a very high level throughout."

== Track listing ==
All compositions by Emily Remler.

| No. | Title | Length |
|---|---|---|
| 1. | "Mocha Spice" | 4:26 |
| 2. | "Catwalk" | 7:19 |
| 3. | "Gwendolyn" | 4:35 |
| 4. | "Antonio" | 4:25 |
| 5. | "Pedals" | 6:54 |
| 6. | "Five Years" | 5:48 |
| 7. | "Mozambique" | 7:44 |

== Personnel ==
- Emily Remler – electric guitar
- John D'earth – trumpet
- Eddie Gomez – bass
- Bob Moses – drums
