= Cookin' at the Queens: Live in Las Vegas 1984 & 1988 =

Live album by Emily Remler
- Released: 2024
- Recorded: May 28, 1984 and September 19, 1988
- Venues: 4 Queens Hotel & Casino, Las Vegas,Nevada
- Genres: Jazz, hard bop
- Length: 155:49
- Label: Resonance
- Producers: Zev Feldman and Bill Milkowski

Emily Remler chronology
This Is Me (1990)	Cookin' at the Queens: Live in Las Vegas 1984 & 1988 (2024)	-

Cookin' at the Queens: Live in Las Vegas 1984 & 1988 is an album by guitarist Emily Remler. It is the first release under her name since This Is Me in 1990 and the first official live recording in her discography.

== Background ==
This compilation presents two radio broadcast, expanded with previously unheard material that was initially cut due to time limitations. While some of this content has circulated online through amateur recordings like YouTube, this official release, offers an extra hour of music that has not been available to the public before.

According to George Cole's review in the web magazine Jazz News, the release of this recording originates from the work of Alan Grant, who was a jazz DJ, producer and musician deeply involved in the jazz scene. In New York City, during the 1950s and 1960s, Grant made jazz more accessible to general audiences by putting on live shows at well-known jazz clubs such as the Half Note and Birdland. He also presented Friday night performances at the Village Vanguard.

Later in his career, Grant moved to Las Vegas, where he continued to support live jazz shows for fifteen years. A key part of his work there was "Monday Night Jazz", a program aired on the local radio station KNPR. This show, recorded at the French Quarter Lounge inside the 4 Queens Hotel & Casino, gained significant popularity and was eventually distributed as "Jazz Night from Las Vegas", which broadcast live jazz to over 150 public radio stations worldwide. The program ran from 1982 to 1996, ending when the hotel declared bankruptcy.

The American Archive of Public Broadcasting site describes 'Four Queens Jazz Night From Las Vegas' as an outstanding live performance radio program offering mainstream jazz by both established and emerging musicians. It housed a valuable archive, recording performances by musicians such as Eddie 'Cleanhead' Vinson, Victor Feldman, Charlie Rouse, and Eddie 'Lockjaw' Davis, while playing a big role in showcasing rising talents such as Ray Pizzi.

Remler's performances from 1984 and 1988 were captured on tape by jazz musician, engineer and producer Brian Sanders, who provides background information in the album's liner notes. He recorded each show using twelve-channel equipment and basic microphones, achieving remarkable sound quality, as described by George Cole.

Throughout the week, the artists typically played three sets, with Sanders usually recording two of them. For these engagements, Remler was backed by Las Vegas-based musicians. The 1984 show featured a quartet with pianist Cocho Arbe, bassist Carson Smith (who also played in the 1988 trio), and drummer Tom Montgomery, who played at numerous Las Vegas hotels and clubs for four decades. The drummer for the 1988 trio was John Pisci, a musician who worked in Las Vegas for over 25 years.

== Reception ==
Professional ratings
Review scores
Source	Rating
AllMusic	4.5/5 stars
All About Jazz	4/5 stars

Thom Jurek of AllMusic hailed the recordings, noting that, when these live recordings took place, "Remler was riding high in the jazz spotlight with an evolved playing style, stellar compositions, an adventurous spirit, and exquisite taste."

In the opinion of Michael Ullman from The Arts Fuse online magazine, the quality of recorded sound, especially of the later session, is near-perfect, "Everywhere Remler plays disciplined, clean, purposeful lines. She's precise as well as lyrical: she seems to have thought things through even as she invents."

Marc Myers wrote in Jazz Wax: "Emily's playing here is extraordinary. Her swing and improvisation sail along with an airy groove and delicate intensity. Her chords are meaty and soulful. And she's never dull or plodding."

== Track listing ==
=== 3-LP Set (Resonance HLP-2076) ===
Side A
No.	Title	Writer(s)	Length
1.	"Moanin'"	B. Timmons	9:43
2.	"How Insensitive (Insensatez)"	A. C. Jobim, V. de Moraes, N. Gimbel	9:52
3.	"Autumn Leaves"	J. Kosma, J. Prévert, J. Mercer	8:03
Total length:			26:98

Side B
No.	Title	Writer(s)	Length
1.	"Polka Dots and Moonbeams"	J. Van Heusen, J. Burke	10:00
2.	"Samba De Orfeu"	L. Bonfa, A. Maria	8:52
3.	"Hot House / What Is This Thing Called Love?"	T. Dameron / C. Porter	5:58
Total length:			24:01

Side C
No.	Title	Writer(s)	Length
1.	"You Don't Know What Love Is"	D. Raye, G. de Paul	11:00
2.	"West Coast Blues"	W. Montgomery	11:56
3.	"Tenor Madness"	S. Rollins	4:50
Total length:			27:06

Side D
No.	Title	Writer(s)	Length
1.	"Out Of Nowhere"	J. Green, E. Heyman	8:19
2.	"Manhã de Carnaval"	L. Bonfa, A. Maria	13:35
3.	"Cisco"	P. Martino	6:14
Total length:			27:68

Side E
No.	Title	Writer(s)	Length
1.	"Yesterdays"	J. Kern, O. Harbach	8:18
2.	"All Blues"	M. Davis	13:35
Total length:			21:53

Side F
No.	Title	Writer(s)	Length
1.	"Someday My Prince Will Come"	F. Churchill, L. Morey	9:02
2.	"So What / Impressions"	M. Davis / J. Coltrane	11:13
3.	"D-Natural Blues"	W. Montgomery	8:18
Total length:			28:33

=== Disc one ===
1. "Moanin'" (B. Timmons) – 9:43
2. "How Insensitive (Insensatez)" (A. C. Jobim, V. de Moraes, N. Gimbel) – 9:52
3. "Autumn Leaves" (J. Kosma, J. Prévert, J. Mercer) – 8:03
4. "Polka Dots And Moonbeams" (J. Burke, J. Van Heusen) – 10:01
5. "Samba de Orfeu" (L. Bonfá, A. Maria) – 8:52
6. "Hot House / What Is This Thing Called Love?" (T. Dameron / C. Porter) – 5:58
7. "You Don't Know What Love Is" (D. Raye, G. De Paul) – 11:00
8. "West Coast Blues" (W. Montgomery) – 11:56
9. "Tenor Madness" (S. Rollins) – 4:50

=== Disc two ===
1. "Out of Nowhere" (J. Green, E. Heyman) – 8:19
2. "Manha De Carnaval" (L. Bonfá, A. Maria) – 13:35
3. "Cisco" (P. Martino) – 6:14
4. "Yesterdays" (J. Kern, O. Harbach) – 8:18
5. "All Blues" (M. Davis) – 13:15
6. "Someday My Prince Will Come" (F. Churchill, L. Morey) – 9:02
7. "So What / Impressions" (M. Davis / J. Coltrane) – 11:13
8. "D-Natural Blues" (W. Montgomery) – 8:18

== Personnel ==
- Emily Remler – guitar
- Cocho Arbe – piano (CD1, CD2, track 1)
- Carson Smith – bass (CD1, CD2)
- Tom Montgomery – drums (CD1, CD2, track 1)
- John Pisci – drums (CD2, tracks 2–8)

=== Production ===
- Producer and liner notes – Zev Feldman and Bill Milkowski
- Executive producer – George Klabin
- Recording engineer – John Veselack (May 28, 1984); Brian Sanders (September 18, 1988)
- Audio remastering – George Klabin and Fran Gala
- Photography – Tom Copi (front and back cover photos); Brian McMillen (booklet photos)
- Art direction – Burton Yount
- Album graphics – Gordon H. Jee
