= Transitions (Emily Remler album) =

Studio album by Emily Remler
- Released: March 1984
- Recorded: October 1983
- Studio: Mastermind Sound Studios, New York
- Genre: Jazz
- Length: 35:12
- Label: Concord Jazz
- Producer: Carl E. Jefferson

Emily Remler chronology
Take Two (1982)	Transitions (1984)	Catwalk (1985)

Transitions is the third studio album by jazz guitarist Emily Remler. She was accompanied by John D'earth on the trumpet and by bassist Eddie Gomez and drummer Bob Moses in the rhythm section.

In the liner notes of this album Leonard Feather gathered Emily Remler's opinion about her choice of this group of musicians for this recording. She said: "Basically this is a guitar trio with a horn added" and "This left me responsible for all the harmony in the accompaniment", explaining that "I'm describing the chord changes, with nobody else behind me, which is quite a responsibility — specially on my own tunes, which have hard changes. Also, I have to supply the harmonic aspects of the accompaniments to solos."

== Reception ==
Professional ratings
Review scores
Source	Rating
AllMusic	4.5/5 stars
The Penguin Guide to Jazz Recordings	3/4 stars
The Rolling Stone Jazz & Blues Album Guide	3/5 stars

For the AllMusic reviewer Scott Yanow "this is one of the strongest of the six Emily Remler Concord recordings" he stated that it "was a strong step forward, as she started to really get away from her early Wes Montgomery/Herb Ellis influence and find a voice of her own".

Journalist Michael J. West wrote in JazzTimes that "Transitions" "marked an increasing focus on her own compositions and a step away from bebop conservatism."

The authors of The Penguin Guide to Jazz Recordings praised Remler's "instinct for fine, unexplored melody," and remarked: "All round, it's a remarkable performance and contributes to one of the very best guitar jazz records of the decade."

The Washington Post's Mike Joyce stated: "there's no piano... As a result, the harmonic responsibilities for the group... rest with Remler, and she meets the challenge head-on... Throughout, each of the musicians develops a distinctive voice, yet together they achieve a smooth, cohesive blend."

== Track listing ==
No.	Title	Length
1.	"Nunca mais" (Emily Remler)	4:56
2.	"Searchin'" (Duke Ellington-Steve Allen)	6:08
3.	"Transitions" (Emily Remler)	7:56
4.	"Del Sasser" (Sam Jones)	6:44
5.	"Coral" (Keith Jarrett)	6:07
6.	"Ode To Mali" (Emily Remler)	4:41

== Personnel ==
- Emily Remler – electric guitar
- John D'earth – trumpet
- Eddie Gomez – bass
- Bob Moses – drums
