= Together (Larry Coryell and Emily Remler album) =

Studio album by Larry Coryell & Emily Remler
- Released: 1985
- Recorded: August 1985
- Studios: Coast Recorders, San Francisco
- Genre: Jazz
- Length: 45:17
- Label: Concord Jazz
- Producer: Carl E. Jefferson

Larry Coryell chronology
Equipoise (1985)	Together (1985)	Le Sacre Du Printemps (1985)

Emily Remler chronology
Catwalk (1985)	Together (1985)	East to Wes (1988)

Together is a jazz album by the American guitarists Larry Coryell and Emily Remler, released by Concord Jazz in 1985. They recorded it directly to two track the same year.

== Reception ==
Professional ratings
Review scores
Source	Rating
AllMusic	4.5/5 stars
Los Angeles Times	5/5 stars
The Penguin Guide to Jazz	3/4 stars
The Virgin Encyclopedia of Jazz	4/5 stars

AllMusic awarded the album 4.5 stars. Its review by Scott Yanow says, "This interesting and one-time matchup features Larry Coryell and Emily Remler on a set of guitar duets. It is easy to tell the two players apart, yet their styles were quite complementary. Highlights of the date (which has four standards, Pat Martino's "Gerri's Blues" and two Coryell originals) include "Joy Spring", "How My Heart Sings" and "How Insensitive"."

In The Penguin Guide to Jazz, the reviewers Richard Cook and Brian Morton wrote, "'Together' delivers fulsomely, a warm, approachable album which does not lack for subtleties. Recommended."

Leonard Feather, writing for the Los Angeles Times, called the album "the best guitar duo album of the year", and stated that "Coryell and Remler interact brilliantly".

== Track listing ==
1. "Arubian Nights" (Larry Coryell) – 5:50
2. "Joy Spring" (Clifford Brown) – 5:44
3. "Ill Wind" (Harold Arlen, Ted Koehler) – 6:27
4. "How My Heart Sings" (Earl Zindars) – 5:43
5. "Six Beats, Six Strings" (Coryell) – 6:57
6. "Gerri’s Blues" (Pat Martino) – 5:29
7. "How Insensitive" (Antônio Carlos Jobim, Norman Gimbel) – 8:27

== Personnel ==
- Larry Coryell – electric guitar (Gibson Super 400 circa 1967) and acoustic guitar (Ovation Adamas - tracks (1 & 5))
- Emily Remler – electric guitar (Borys) and acoustic guitar (Ovation Adamas - tracks (1 & 5))
