= Ill Wind (1934 song) =

1983 song

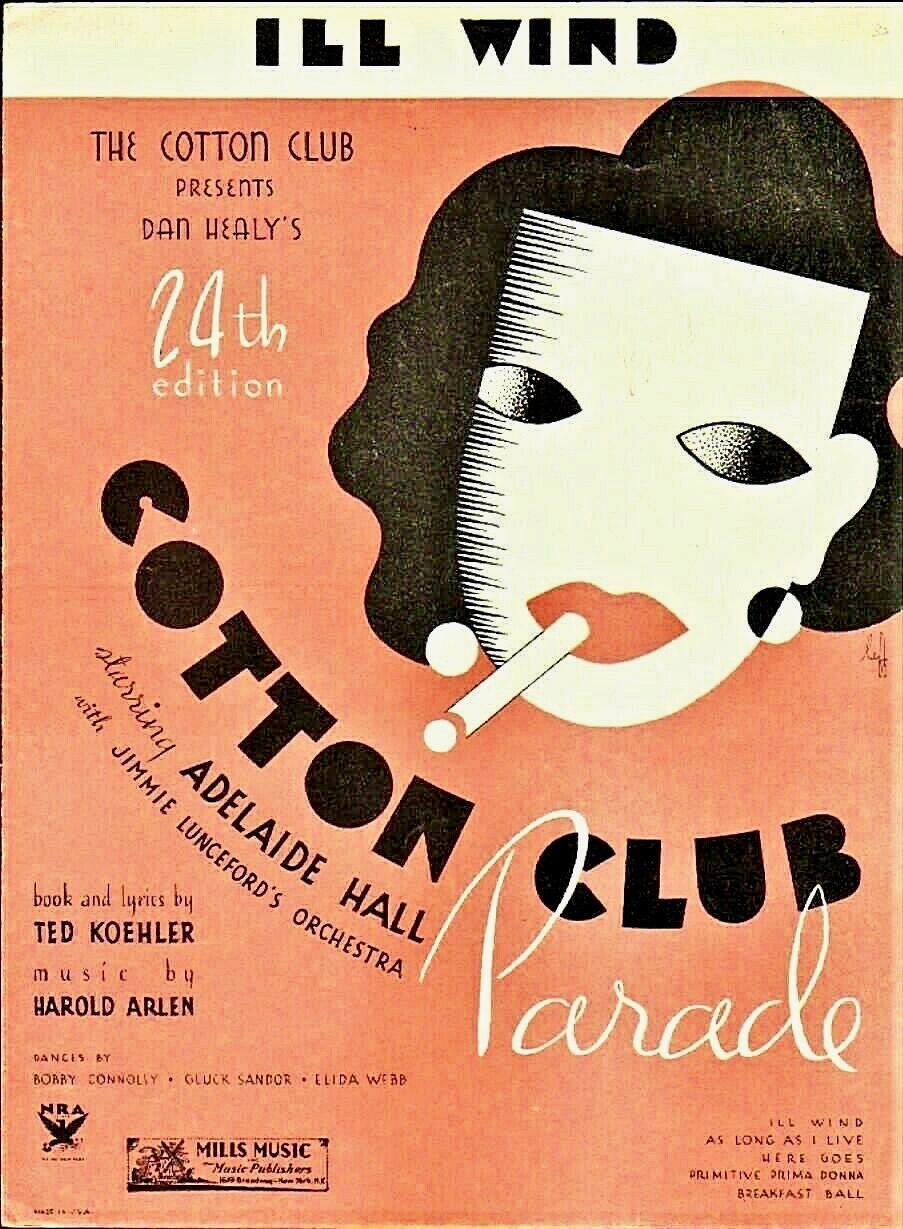

Song
- Released: 1934
- Genre: Traditional pop
- Songwriters: Harold Arlen; Ted Koehler

"Ill Wind (You're Blowin' Me No Good)" is a song composed by Harold Arlen with lyrics by Ted Koehler; the melody came to Arlen while he was visiting Anya Taranda, a model who later became his wife. It was written for Arlen and Koehler's last Cotton Club show in 1934, and sung by Adelaide Hall.

Hall explained how the song was presented on the Cotton Club stage:

I [...] starred in Cotton Club Parade, where I sang "Ill Wind", which Harold Arlen had written for me. There were twenty-four girl dancers behind me, all dressed in grey, and I was in pink. It was the first show ever that they had nitrogen smoke from the floor on stage.

The song is featured in the 1984 Francis Ford Coppola film The Cotton Club, where it is sung by Lonette McKee; the character she plays in the film has similarities to Adelaide Hall in real life.

== Notable recordings ==
- Maxine Sullivan (1939)
- Lena Horne - Moanin' Low (1942)
- Frank Sinatra - In the Wee Small Hours (1955)
- Dinah Washington - Dinah! (1956)
- Ben Webster - Soulville (1957)
- Billie Holiday - All or Nothing at All (1958)
- Ella Fitzgerald - Ella at the Opera House (1958), Ella Fitzgerald Sings the Harold Arlen Songbook (1961)
- Horace Silver - Further Explorations (1958)
- Stan Kenton - Standards in Silhouette (1959)
- Howard McGhee - Sharp Edge (1961)
- Sarah Vaughan - After Hours (1961), Send in the Clowns (1981)
- Earl Grant - Midnight Sun (1962)
- Lee Morgan - Cornbread (1967)
- Larry Coryell/Emily Remler - Together (1985)
- Australian recording artist Kate Ceberano - Kate Ceberano and her Septet (1986)
- Adelaide Hall - Live at the Riverside Studios (Riverside Studios) (Jay Productions Ltd./TER Ltd. CDVIR 8312, 1990)
- Michael Brook featuring Michael Stipe, Jimmy Scott, and Flea - Albino Alligator soundtrack (1997)
- Lils Mackintosh - Seasons (1997)
- Bobby Caldwell - Come Rain or Come Shine (1999)
- June Christy - A Friendly Session, Vol. 1 (2000) with the Johnny Guarnieri Quintet
- Audra McDonald - Happy Songs (2002)
- Mina - Mina per Wind (Vol.2) (2002)
- Debbie Harry (in a medley with "Stormy Weather") - Hal Willner's Stormy Weather: The Music of Harold Arlen (2003)
- Patti LuPone - The Lady with the Torch (2006)
- Noisettes - Wild Young Hearts (2009)
- Johnny Dankworth - Too Cool for the Blues (2010)
- Norah Jones with the Charlie Haden Quartet West - Sophisticated Ladies (2010)
