= Aydın Esen =

Turkish jazz musician

Aydın Esen (born 1962) is a Turkish jazz musician who plays keyboards and electronics.

== Career ==
The son of a trumpeter, Esen began music lessons at the age of five in Turkey and attended a music conservatory, continuing for 13 years. His background was in classical music although he also enjoyed playing drums. At the age of ten, he began sneaking out of school to play with other musicians and as a teenager he led several groups in a variety of styles. Esen first came to the United States when he was awarded a four-year scholarship to Berklee College of Music where he reportedly completed all of his classes within one year. After studying at the New England Conservatory of Music and Juilliard, he had opportunities to play with Gary Burton, Eddie Gomez, Pat Metheny and Emily Remler.

in 1989, he won the 1st prize at the Martial Solal Piano Competition in Paris.

He has worked with Dave Liebman and Wolfgang Muthspiel.

His composition "scape-X" (commissioned by Big Basel Festival) was premiered by the Ensemble Phoenix Basel with him as a soloist at the Big Basel Festival in January 2020.

== Discography ==
=== As leader ===
- Pictures (Bellaphon, 1989)
- So Many Lifetimes (JMS, 1989)
- Aydin Esen (JMS, 1990)
- Anadolu (Columbia, 1992)
- Timescape (Doublemoon, 1998)
- Living (Universal/EmArcy, 2001)
- Dialogo (Material, 2005)
- Light Years (Extinction, 2006)

=== As sideman ===
- Ranjit Barot, Bada Boom (EMI, 2010)
- Jonatha Brooke, Plumb (Blue Thumb, 1995)
- Tommy Campbell, My Heart (Jazz City, 1989)
- Kai Eckhardt, Honour Simplicity Respect the Flow (Naim, 2000)
- Daniel Humair, Edges (Label Bleu, 1991)
- Wolfgang Muthspiel, Timezones (Amadeo, 1989)
- Emily Remler, This Is Me (Justice, 1990)
- Steve Smith, Flashpoint (Tone Center, 2005)
- Miroslav Vitous, Music of Weather Report (ECM, 2016)
- Miroslav Vitous, Ziljabu Nights (Intuition, 2016)
