= Downhome Sophisticate =

Studio album by Corey Harris
- Released: 2002
- Genre: Blues
- Label: Rounder
- Producers: Corey Harris, Jamal Millner

Corey Harris chronology
Live at Starr Hill 1/27/01 (2001)	Downhome Sophisticate (2002)	Mississippi to Mali (2003)

Downhome Sophisticate is an album by the American blues musician Corey Harris, released in 2002.

The album peaked at No. 4 on Billboard's Blues Albums chart. Harris promoted the album by touring with his band, 5X5.

== Production ==
The album was produced by Harris and Jamal Millner. Millner also played guitar on Downhome Sophisticate. Henry Butler played piano on "Black Maria".

== Critical reception ==
Professional ratings
Review scores
Source	Rating
AllMusic	4.5/5 stars
Robert Christgau	A−
Ottawa Citizen	4.5/5 stars
(The New) Rolling Stone Album Guide	4/5 stars

Robert Christgau noted that the "rock-type poetry ... makes like social conditions are as real as love and dreams." The Washington Post stated that "on 'Santoro', which concerns social injustice and racial profiling, Harris vents his frustration in a voice that rises just above a whisper to ask: 'So why you figure they be so jumpy on the trigger. So quick like that, to assassinate black?'"

Bass Player called the album "a revelation—a nasty, Old School blues album with tinges of boogie-woogie, African soul, hip-hop, blazing yet sensitive slide guitar, and pristine production." The Commercial Appeal thought that the album "shows that one can embrace roots and still be forward looking ... Rarely has traditional sounded more modern." The Ottawa Citizen opined that "this definitely isn't for your 12-bar, hard-core crowd, but for those who're a little more interested in where the blues and grown-up R&B might be headed in the not-to-distant future."

AllMusic wrote that "it's an easy leap for Harris from folklore to urgent urban settings; his depiction of a police car as a fearsome, prowling Biblical beast makes 'Santoro' especially disturbing."

== Track listing ==
1. "Giddyup" - 0:18
2. "Frankie Doris" - 2:52
3. "Money on My Mind" - 3:31
4. "Don't Let the Devil Ride" - 2:10
5. "Keep Your Lamp Trimmed and Burning" - 2:53
6. "Capitaine" - 2:06
7. "Santoro" - 2:36
8. "Fire on the Radio" - 0:27
9. "Fire" - 5:09
10. "BB" - 2:18
11. "Downhome Prelude" - 0:09
12. "Downhome Sophisticate" - 3:17
13. "Sista Rose" - 6:28
14. "Black Maria" - 4:32
15. "Chinook" - 2:30
16. "Money Eye" - 4:04
17. "Where the Yellow Cross the Dog" - 1:53
18. "F'shizza (Santoro Remix)" - 5:40
