= John D'earth =

American jazz trumpeter

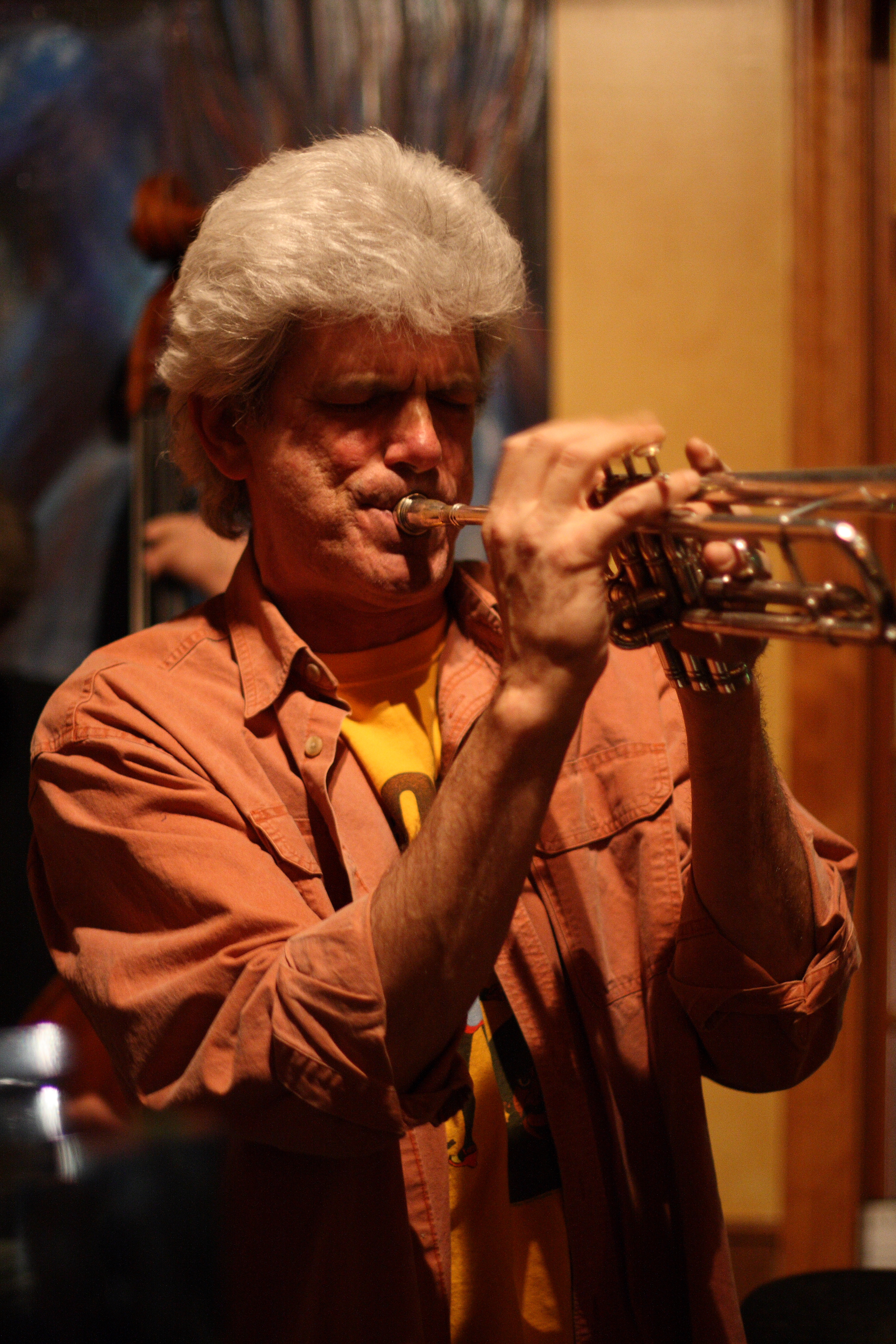
- Performing Casco, Maine 2008

Background information
- Born: John Edward Dearth II; March 30, 1950 (age 76); Framingham, Massachusetts United States
- Origin: Holliston, Massachusetts United States
- Genres: Jazz, hard bop, post-bop
- Occupations: Musician; Composer; Professor
- Instrument: trumpet
- Years active: 1967–present
- Labels: Vanguard, Double-Time
- Website: dearthworks.com

John D'earth (born March 30, 1950) is an American post-bop/hard bop jazz trumpeter born in Framingham, Massachusetts, who has appeared on recordings by Dave Matthews and Bruce Hornsby as well as recording a number of CDs on his own. He currently resides in Charlottesville, Virginia.

== Early life ==
John Edward Dearth II was born in 1950 in Framingham, Massachusetts, growing up in nearby Holliston. His father had survived the Pacific theater of World War II and was "obsessed" with jazz. D'earth, who added the apostrophe to his name later in life, says of his progenitor, "He was a maniac for music and for jazz music. He was my first teacher. He revealed to me mysteries of art and music that are priceless."

His father would blast his records throughout the night, driving the family crazy. He would also sit with his two-year-old son, teaching him to play drum brushes on a metal tray. His father was "drawn to the complexities of be-bop" with its raw rhythms and stylings. "He hated white bands that were corny and tight," D'earth states. "Those were prejudices too, and I learned some of those prejudices early on."

The D'earth family lived in a house from the 1690s that had been The Littlefield Tavern during the Colonial era. D'earth's parents divorced when he was eight, around the time he got his first trumpet. He immediately walked out into the yard and played it to the trees, discovering scales on his own.

Louis Armstrong and His Hot Five was D'earth's favorite band, but he also appreciated classical music. Jazz instruction wasn't so easy to find in the early 1960s, but D'earth crossed paths with Henry "Boots" Mussulli, who was a veteran of the big band days.

This Sicilian alto saxophone player and arranger had opened the Sons of Italy Crystal Room, a speakeasy that presented acts like Count Basie and Roy Eldridge in nearby Milford. He was part of a group of jazz instructors who helped form Berklee College of Music.

One day Mussulli sat a young D'earth next to him and called a friend and simply said, "Listen." He and D'earth began improvising on the Charlie Parker be-pop classic "Confirmation". When done, Mussulli picked the receiver and said, "Fourteen" — then hung up. That experience changed D'earth's life, confirming his musical gift. As a teenager, DownBeat said of his performance at the Newport Jazz Festival that he played "like a young Freddie Hubbard."

On Mussulli's impact D'earth says:

What he taught me about professionalism and what it is to really know your stuff ... to be uncompromising with yourself about it ... I learned that from him, and everything unfolds from there. You've got to know two things in jazz: Tell your story and don't copy people.

D'earth met Robert Jospé, a jazz drummer who would later relocate to Charlottesville and become a UVA music instructor, in 1967 at The Cambridge School of Weston, a preparatory high school near Boston. They started a group named Fire and Ice, and "began a collaboration that continues today."

== Career ==
D'earth attended Harvard University briefly only to drop out and pursue his musical career. In his early years he played in Bob Moses' innovative bands. He co-founded the group Cosmology (Vanguard Records) with bandmates drummer Robert Jospe and singer Dawn Thompson — whom D'earth later married. Jospé, D'earth, and Thompson, whom he met in New York, came to Charlottesville in 1981 for a summer and decided to settle there. Before heading for New York City, Thompson had helped found the famed Prism Coffeehouse musical venue in Charlottesville.

D'earth serves as Director of Jazz Performance at the University of Virginia and was at one point the jazz artist in residence at Virginia Commonwealth University. D'earth was music teacher at The Tandem School in Charlottesville from the early to mid-1980s.

D'earth regularly plays at Miller's Downtown on the Charlottesville pedestrian mall with other musicians including JC Kuhl, Pete Spaar, Jamal Millner, DJ Harrison, Pureum Jin, Brian Caputo, Wells Hanley, Adam Larrabee, Brian Jones, and many others. He often played at Fellini's No. 9 with Devonne Harris (drums), Bob Hallahan (piano), and Pete Spaar (upright bass).

D'earth makes frequent appearances with younger up-and-coming players as well as older mainstay musicians alike in the Richmond, Virginia, area. D'earth is known for his work with musicians such as Miles Davis, Buddy Rich, Dave Matthews Band, and Emily Remler. He has recorded for Vanguard Records, ENJA Records, DoubleTime Jazz, and his own Cosmology label.

== Discography ==
Solo

On (Cosmology, 2013)

1. Yo, Susannah
2. What Woody Do (Adam's Vamp)
3. Prelude II
4. Outside Insight
5. Market
6. Goodbye Secret King (for LeRoi Moore)
7. Lady on a Train
8. We Shall See
9. Water Is The Blood of Earth
- John D'earth - trumpet, flugelhorn
- Pete Spaar - bass
- Wells Hanley - piano
- Devonne Harris - drums
- J.C. Kuhl - tenor saxophone

Restoration Comedy (Double-Time, 2000)

- John D'earth - trumpet, composer, producer
- Howard Curtis - drums
- Mike Richmond - upright bass
- Mulgrew Miller - piano
- Jerry Bergonzi - sax

Thursday Night Live at Millers (Cosmology, 1998)

- John D'earth - trumpet
- Dawn Thompson - vocals
- Jeff Decker and Bobby Read - saxophones
- Jamal Millner - guitar
- Wells Hanley - piano
- Pete Spaar - upright bass
- Robert Jospé - drums
- guest Doug Bethel - trombone
- produced by Greg Howard

One Bright Glance (Enja, 1990)

- John D'earth - trumpet, composer
- John Abercrombie - guitar, guitar synthesizer
- Marc Johnson - bass
- Howard Curtis - drums
- Steve Gaboury - producer, engineer

With Thompson D'earth

When the Serpent Flies (Cosmology, 2006)

- Dawn Thompson - vocals
- John D'earth - trumpet and flugelhorn
- J.C. Kuhl - tenor saxophone
- Jamal Millner - guitar
- Daniel Clarke - piano
- Pete Spaar - double bass
- Brian Caputo - drums
- produced by Greg Howard

Mercury (Cosmology, 2001)

- Dawn Thompson - vocals
- John D'Earth - trumpet
- Carter Beauford - drums
- Dave Matthews - vocals
- Jamal Millner - guitar
- Bobby Read - sax
- Wells Hanley - piano
- Pete Spaar - upright bass
- produced by Greg Howard

=== As sideman ===
With Ray Anderson

- Big Band Record (Gramavision, 1994) with the George Gruntz Concert Jazz Band

With Emily Remler

- Transitions (Concord Records, 1983)
- Catwalk (Concord, 1985)

== Honors, awards, distinctions ==
- D'earth appears in The Biographical Encyclopedia of Jazz, by Leonard Feather and Ira Gitler

(Oxford University Press, 1999); pages 175–76.

== Personal ==
D'earth appeared regularly with his vocalist wife Dawn Thompson, who died August 31, 2017, after surviving nine years with brain cancer. She was born in Alexandria, Virginia, on October 9, 1946.
