= In a Sentimental Mood =

1935 Duke Ellington song

Composition by Duke Ellington
- Published: 1935
- Genre: Jazz
- Composer: Duke Ellington
- Lyricist: Manny Kurtz

"In a Sentimental Mood" – first 9 bars on tenor saxophone

"In a Sentimental Mood" is a jazz composition by Duke Ellington. He composed the piece in 1935 and recorded it with his orchestra during the same year. Lyrics were written by Manny Kurtz; Ellington's manager Irving Mills gave himself a percentage of the publishing, so the song was credited to all three. Other popular versions in 1935/36 were by Benny Goodman and by Mills Blue Rhythm Band. The opening notes of the song's melody resemble Gershwin's 1926 "Someone To Watch Over Me".

== Background ==
According to Ellington, the song was born in Durham, North Carolina. "We had played a big dance in a tobacco warehouse, and afterwards a friend of mine, an executive in the North Carolina Mutual Insurance Company, threw a party for Amy. I was playing piano when another one of our friends had some trouble with two chicks. To pacify them, I composed this there and then, with one chick standing on each side of the piano." The recording featured solos by Otto Hardwicke, Harry Carney, Lawrence Brown, and Rex Stewart.

Ellington recorded a version with John Coltrane which appears on Duke Ellington and John Coltrane (1963). The original was recorded in F major, starting on D minor and with the bridge in D♭ major. But the Ellington and Coltrane version was performed in B♭ minor or D♭ major, with an interlude in A major.

A section
Dm Dm(M7)	Dm7 Dm6	Gm Gm(M7)	Gm7 Gm6
Dm	Dm D7	Gm7 C7	F

B section
Db Bbm7	Ebm7 Ab7	Db Bb7	Ebm7 Ab7
Db Bbm7	Ebm7 Ab7	Gm7	C7

== Other versions ==
- Duke Ellington – Piano Reflections (1953)
- Django Reinhardt and Stéphane Grappelli – Quintette du Hot Club de France (1937)
- Sonny Rollins – Sonny Rollins with the Modern Jazz Quartet (1953)
- Art Tatum and Roy Eldridge – The Tatum Group Masterpieces, Vol. 2 (1955)
- Ella Fitzgerald and Duke Ellington – Ella Fitzgerald Sings the Duke Ellington Song Book (1957)
- Chico Hamilton and Eric Dolphy – The Original Ellington Suite (feat. Eric Dolphy) (1958)
- Tommy Flanagan – The Tommy Flanagan Trio (1960)
- Sarah Vaughan – for her album After Hours (1961)
- Duke Ellington and John Coltrane – Duke Ellington & John Coltrane (1962)
- Lucky Thompson – Lucky Strikes (1964)
- Nancy Wilson with Hank Jones – But Beautiful (1969)
- McCoy Tyner – Atlantis (1974)
- Arthur Blythe - In the Tradition (1979)
- Emily Remler – Firefly (1981)
- Michael Brecker – with Steps Ahead for their album Magnetic (1986)
- Michel Petrucciani with Jim Hall and Wayne Shorter for their live album Power of three (Blue Note, 1987).
- Johnny Mathis – for his album In a Sentimental Mood: Mathis Sings Ellington (1990)
- Roseanna Vitro – Reaching for the Moon (1991)
- Tony Bennett – included in the album Bennett Sings Ellington: Hot & Cool (1999)
- Alex Bugnon – Soul Purpose (2001)
- Larry Coryell – Inner Urge (2001)
- Mac Miller – "Diablo" (2014)
- Shai Maestro – Human (2021)
- Pasquale Innarella & Andrea Zanchi – Cultural Bridge (2025)

== Appearances in other media ==
In the Netherlands, the chords at the beginning are a well-known part of the song since the 1960s, due to its use as the theme of Simon Carmiggelt, one of the country's most famous writers, when he was reading his columns on national television.

== See also ==
- List of 1930s jazz standards
