= Jamal Millner =

American guitarist (born 1971)

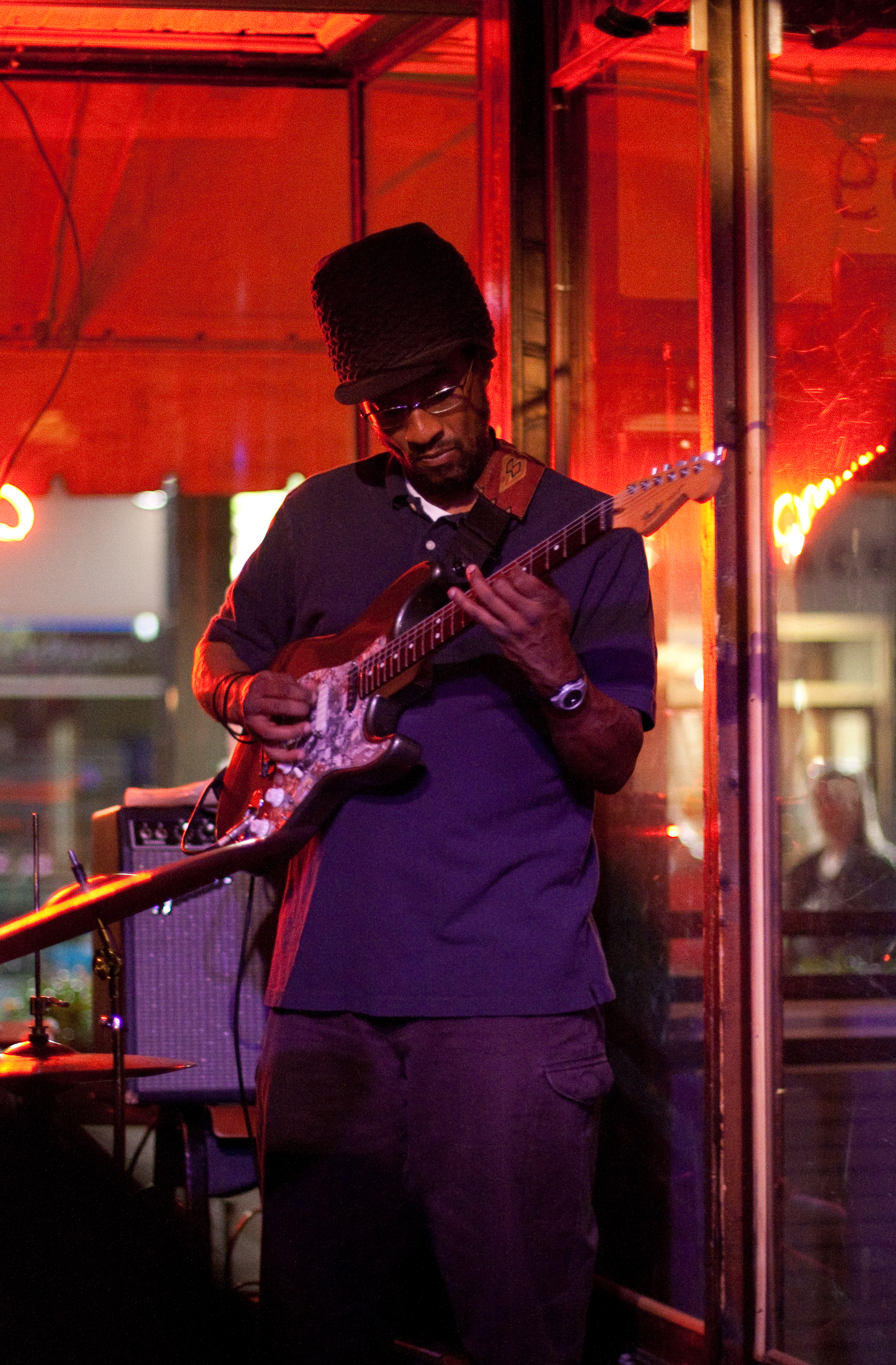
- With John D'earth; At Miller's, May 13, 2010; Charlottesville, Virginia

Background information
- Born: February 26, 1971 (age 55); West Virginia, U.S.
- Genres: Black American Music; Western European Art Music
- Occupation: Musician
- Instrument: Guitar

Jamal Millner (born February 26, 1971) is an American guitarist from West Virginia, who was a member of the band 5x5 led by Corey Harris.

== Early life ==
His parents went to "lots of shows". When he was four they took him to a Taj Mahal show and he got up on stage and played his plastic guitar. This was his very first "gig".

== Discography ==
=== As leader ===
- Phatness (1997)

=== As sideman ===
- 2018 : To Everyone in All the World: A Celebration of Pete Seeger - John McCutcheon - Guitar (Electric)
- 2015 : Live! From Turtle Island - Corey Harris - Composer
- 2009 : Chioggia Beat - Morwenna Lasko - Engineer, Guitar (Electric)
- 2003 : Box of the Blues - Various artists - Producer, Guitar
- 2003 : Mississippi to Mali - Corey Harris - Engineer, Photography
- 2003 : Sleeping Lines - Plink - Guitar
- 2002 : Downhome Sophisticate - Corey Harris - Producer, Arranger, Composer
- 2001 : Untethered - Gar Ragland - Composer
- 1999 : Greens from the Garden - Corey Harris and the 5x5 - Guitar, Producer, Arranger
- 1999 : Live at the End of the World - Baaba Seth - Producer
- 1996 : Between White and Black - Barbara Martin - Bottleneck Guitar
