= Daily Bread (Corey Harris album) =

Studio album by Corey Harris
- Released: 2005
- Genre: Blues
- Label: Rounder
- Producers: Scott Billington, Steve Reynolds

Corey Harris chronology
Mississippi to Mali (2003)	Daily Bread (2005)	Zion Crossroads (2007)

Daily Bread is an album by the American blues musician Corey Harris, released in 2005.

== Production ==
The album was produced by Scott Billington and Steve Reynolds. Olu Dara played trumpet on "Mami Wata" and "The Peach". The album was recorded in a week, with Harris choosing to do only a few takes of each song.

== Critical reception ==
Professional ratings
Review scores
Source	Rating
AllMusic	4.5/5 stars
Philadelphia Daily News	B+
The Province	B
The Tampa Tribune	A

The Chicago Tribune thought that Harris's "strategy is to jam blues effortlessly as possible with Jamaican reggae, African dance music and Chicago soul, and mostly it works—his gently grooving version of the late Little Milton's signature 'A Nickel and a Nail' is the album's peak." The Philadelphia Daily News deemed the album "a rootsy yet contemporary global folk fete festooned with sinewy African high life, Jamaican reggae, New Orleans blues and jazz flavors."

The Chicago Sun-Times considered it to be one of the 10 best blues album of 2005, writing that "the ethnomusicolical bluesman sometimes comes off as a know-it-all, but this well-crafted disc remembers that making music is supposed to be fun, not a classroom exercise." The Tampa Tribune concluded that "from the title track forward, Harris embarks on a global journey of African-influenced roots music."

AllMusic wrote that "perhaps the most amazing thing about this album is how ultimately American it sounds ... in spite of its Caribbean and African lilt, a testament to how well Harris pulls all these different international strands together without losing sight of where his musical journey began."

== Track listing ==
1. "Daily Bread" (Billington, Harris)
2. "I See Your Face" (Holt)
3. "Got to Be a Better Way" (Harris, Reynolds)
4. "A Nickel and a Nail" (Robey, Robinson)
5. "The Sweetest Fruit" (Harris)
6. "Mami Wata" (Dara, Harris)
7. "Lamb's Bread" (Walker)
8. "Just in Time" (Dennis)
9. "Khaira" (Traditional)
10. "Big String" (Billington, Harris)
11. "More Precious Than Gold" (Harris)
12. "The Bush Is Burning" (Harris)
13. "The Peach" (Dara, Harris)
