= Firefly (Emily Remler album) =

Studio album by Emily Remler
- Released: April 1981
- Recorded: April 1981
- Studio: Coast Recorders, San Francisco
- Genre: Jazz
- Length: 39:39
- Label: Concord Jazz
- Producer: Carl E. Jefferson

Emily Remler chronology
Firefly (1981)	Take Two (1982)

Firefly is the debut album by jazz guitarist Emily Remler. She was accompanied by pianist Hank Jones, bassist Bob Maize, and drummer Jake Hanna.

== Reception ==
Professional ratings
Review scores
Source	Rating
AllMusic	3/5 stars
The Penguin Guide to Jazz	3/4 stars
The Rolling Stone Jazz & Blues Album Guide	3/5 stars

A review by AllMusic called the album an example of bop bordering on hard bop. For the 1980s it would not be considered groundbreaking, but the album sounded like it could have come out of the height of the bop era in the 1960s.

In the 7th edition of the Penguin Guide to Jazz on CD, Richard Cook and Brian Morton wrote: "Firefly is fluent if a little anonymous, although she handles the diversity of 'Strollin' and 'In A Sentimental Mood' without any hesitation."

Writing for JazzFuel, Matt Fripp stated: "Firefly was an essential step in putting [Remler] firmly on the map as a jazz guitar player, proving to the old guard that she was more than capable of carrying the torch... On the back of the Firefly success, Remler was offered an extension on her contract with Concord Jazz for three additional albums."

Gear Diary's Michael Anderson called Firefly "a straight-ahead record... that showed great artistry and potential," and commented: "It came around the time that the 'young lions' such as Wynton Marsalis were revisiting the classic sounds from before fusion, and this recording fit in well with that crowd and got her more attention than she might have a couple of years earlier. The record was uneven, but had enough fire and promise to gain Remler a reputation."

In the CD liner notes, Maggie Hawthorn commented: "Remler did the arrangements but she notes that there were no rehearsals - just considerable warmth and empathy among the participants".

== Track listing ==
No.	Title	Length
1.	"Strollin'" (Horace Silver)	5:29
2.	"Look to the Sky" (Antonio Carlos Jobim)	5:23
3.	"Perk's Blues" (Remler)	4:06
4.	"Firefly" (Remler)	4:05
5.	"Movin' Along" (Wes Montgomery)	5:30
6.	"A Taste of Honey" (Ric Marlow, Bobby Scott)	2:09
7.	"Inception" (McCoy Tyner)	5:09
8.	"In a Sentimental Mood" (Duke Ellington, Manny Curtis, Irving Mills)	7:48

== Personnel ==
- Emily Remler – electric guitar
- Hank Jones – piano
- Bob Maize – bass
- Jake Hanna – drums
