= Greens from the Garden =

Studio album by Corey Harris
- Released: 1999
- Genre: Country blues
- Length: 60:03
- Label: Alligator
- Producer: Corey Harris

Corey Harris chronology
Fish Ain't Bitin' (1997)	Greens from the Garden (1999)	Vu-Du Menz (2000)

Greens from the Garden is an album by the American musician Corey Harris, released in 1999. The album title was inspired by a Buddy Guy comment about Harris's country blues. Harris considered the album to be roots music. "Wild West", about gun violence, was released as a single. Harris supported the album with North American and Australian tours.

== Production ==
Greens from the Garden was produced by Harris, although Alligator Records asked him to remix it with an outside producer. It is a concept album, likening the vegetables that go into a pot of greens to various Black musical styles. The album contains spoken interludes in which Harris and his family reflect on the cultural role of land and nourishment. Henry Butler played piano on two tracks. Members of the Dirty Dozen Brass Band backed Harris on "Congo Square Rag". "Teabag Blues" is an outtake from the Mermaid Avenue recording sessions to which Harris contributed; the lyrics are by Woody Guthrie and the harmony vocals are provided by Billy Bragg. "Eh la Bas" and "Pas Parlez" are sung in French. "Nola Rag" is about Harris's days busking in New Orleans. The version of the traditional "Just a Closer Walk with Thee" is played in a reggae style. "Sweet Black Angel" is a version of the Lucille Bogan song.

== Critical reception ==
Professional ratings
Review scores
Source	Rating
Edmonton Journal	4/5 stars
The Gazette	8/10
The Penguin Guide to Blues Recordings	4/4 stars
Rolling Stone	4/5 stars
The Tampa Tribune	4/4 stars
The Virgin Encyclopedia of Nineties Music	4/5 stars

The Independent called Harris "one of the young, black neo-country-blues stylists currently attempting to wrest the form back from the straitjacketing notions of technical dexterity imposed upon it by a generation of white guitar-heroes." The Washington Post opined that "like Taj Mahal, a kindred spirit, Harris possesses a voice and personality that are hard to resist no matter what the tune or setting." The Edmonton Journal wrote that "Harris's superb solo feature on National steel and vocal, 'Sweet Black Angel', has a hint of underlying fun, and he matches it every step of the way with confident picking."

The Des Moines Register said that Harris "has echoed prewar acoustic blues better than anyone in recent years, and his raw talent grounds the album." Newsday stated that Harris "combines New Orleans stomp with country-flavored fingerpicking, Caribbean rhythms and ragtime." The Morning Call and Nashville Scene included Greens from the Garden on their lists of the best albums of 1999. The Tampa Tribune noted that "this has to be the most impressive blues release of the year."

The Penguin Guide to Blues Recordings awarded the album a "crown" symbol, indicating a "truly exceptional" album that belongs in any "basic blues library".

== Track listing ==
Greens from the Garden track listing
No.	Title	Length
1.	"Introduction to the Greens"	0:48
2.	"Basehead"	4:41
3.	"Honeysuckle"	4:23
4.	"Tapado"	0:39
5.	"Eh la Bas"	5:50
6.	"Interlude"	0:40
7.	"Wild West"	4:04
8.	"In the Kitchen with Momma"	0:22
9.	"Sweet Black Angel"	4:08
10.	"Pas Parlez"	4:30
11.	"Interlude"	0:13
12.	"Lynch Blues"	6:16
13.	"Greens Back in the Day"	1:20
14.	"Congo Square Rag"	1:44
15.	"Diddy Wah Diddy"	2:31
16.	"Ites"	1:14
17.	"Just a Closer Walk with Thee"	5:56
18.	"Nola Rag"	4:56
19.	"Epilogue"	0:49
20.	"Teabag Blues"	4:59
Total length:		60:03
