= Jack of Diamonds (song) =

American traditional folk song

Jack of Diamonds (a.k.a. Jack o' Diamonds and Jack of Diamonds (Is a Hard Card to Play)) is a traditional folk song. It is a Texas gambling song that was popularized by Blind Lemon Jefferson. It was sung from the point of view of a railroad man who had lost money playing conquian. At least twelve artists recorded the tune before World War II. It has been recorded under various titles such as "A Corn Licker Still in Georgia" (Riley Puckett) and "Rye Whiskey" (Tex Ritter).

The song is related to "Drunkard's Hiccoughs", "Johnnie Armstrong", "Todlen Hame", "Bacach", "Robi Donadh Gorrach", "The Wagoner's Lad", "Clinch Mountain", "The Cuckoo", "Rye Whiskey", "Saints Bound for Heaven", "Separation", and "John Adkins' Farewell." This family of tunes originally comes from the British Isles, though it is most well known in North America. The lyrics may originate in the American Civil War song "The Rebel Soldier" and the melody from the Scottish song "Robie Donadh Gorrach", known by Nathaniel Gow as "An Old Highland Song".

== Covers ==
The following artists, among others, have included the song in their repertoire.

- Blind Lemon Jefferson (1926)
- Tex Ritter (a very early recording, for which he is famous)
- Skip James
- John Lee Hooker (on the album Jack o' Diamonds: 1949 Recordings, released 2004)
- John Jacob Niles
- Odetta (on Odetta Sings Ballads and Blues, 1956)
- Lonnie Donegan released it as a single in 1957 (available on Rock Island Line: The Singles Anthology 1955-1967, released 1985)
- Betty Johnson recorded a version for Atlantic Records in 1958.
- Mance Lipscomb
- Ramblin' Jack Elliott (on multiple LPs)
- The Fendermen 1960 on the album Mule Skinner Blues
- Eric Von Schmidt on "The Folk Blues Of Eric Von Schmidt" released in 1963.
- The Byrds on the compilation album Preflyte
- The Daily Flash, a 1960s Seattle-based folk rock group, released their version as a single in June 1966 (available on a 1998 compilation box Nuggets: Original Artyfacts from the First Psychedelic Era, 1965–1968, Rhino Records).
- Fairport Convention recorded a version on their debut album. Credited to Bob Dylan and Ben Carruthers, it featured lyrics based on the original.
- Tarbox Ramblers used it to open their first album.
- Waylon Jennings (with the .357s on the album Waylon Forever)
- Corb Lund and the Hurtin' Albertans (on their album Five Dollar Bill)
- Dave Matthews
- Tommy Jarrell
- Corey Harris (on the album Fish Ain't Bitin', released in 1997)
- Nick Cave & the Bad Seeds (on the album B-Sides & Rarities, released 22 March 2005.)
- P.W. Long (on the album We Didn't See You On Sunday, released 1997.)
- Alexander Hacke & Danielle de Picciotto (on the 2008 album Ship Of Fools)
- The Ramblin' Riversiders
- Scott H. Biram (on the album Nothin' But Blood, released 2014)
- The Charlatans
- Big Brother and the Holding Company

== See also ==
- The Cuckoo (song), often titled "Coo Coo" or "Coo Coo Bird", was recorded by Clarence Ashley in 1929 and contains a similar reference to the Jack of Diamonds. A cover version was recorded by Big Brother and the Holding Company as "Coo Coo."
