= Fish Ain't Bitin' =

1997 album by Corey Harris

Studio album by Corey Harris
- Released: 1997
- Genre: Blues, country blues
- Label: Alligator
- Producer: Larry Hoffman, Corey Harris

Corey Harris chronology
Between Midnight and Day (1995)	Fish Ain't Bitin' (1997)	Greens from the Garden (1999)

Fish Ain't Bitin' is the second album by the American musician Corey Harris, released in 1997 through Alligator Records. Harris supported the album with a North American tour that included shows opening for B.B. King. Fish Ain't Bitin' won a W. C. Handy Award for the best acoustic blues album of 1997.

== Production ==
The album was co-produced by Larry Hoffman, who also arranged the horns. Harris was inspired by the music of New Orleans, where he had lived for several years. He used a National steel guitar. Harris used a tuba and two trombones on some of the tracks. "God Don't Ever Change" is a cover of the Blind Willie Johnson song. "Bumble Bee Blues" is a cover of the Memphis Minnie song. "Jack O'Diamonds" is a version of the song popularized by Blind Lemon Jefferson. "Worried Life Blues" was written by Big Maceo. "5-0 Blues" is about police brutality. The title track was influenced by Harris's childhood catfishing excursions.

== Critical reception ==
Professional ratings
Review scores
Source	Rating
AllMusic	4/5 stars
Robert Christgau	A−
DownBeat	3/5 stars
Orlando Sentinel	5/5 stars
The Penguin Guide to Blues Recordings	4/4 stars
Pittsburgh Post-Gazette	3/4 stars
(The New) Rolling Stone Album Guide	4/5 stars
Seattle Post-Intelligencer	B+
Uncut	4/5 stars

The Pittsburgh Post-Gazette called Harris "more than an imitator," writing that "like many of his musical ancestors, Harris has turned the stuff of his life into a musical anthology." The Orlando Sentinel noted that, "in addition to a distinctive, gravelly baritone with wonderful sustain, he has an exceptionally strong sense of rhythm and knows how to write a good tune." The Calgary Herald deemed the album "a delicious acoustic blues disc that captures that back porch blues feel of old and yet remains completely contemporary."

The Times Colonist determined that "Harris throws everything from New Orleans brass bands to rap into his unique, and it all comes out majestic and inspired country blues." The Michigan Chronicle concluded that the album "demonstrates the same haunting majesty that powered the [blues] during its pre-World War II, pre-electric phase." Robert Christgau opined that "as much as Harris's cross-rhythms and vocal panoply honor his readings of the classics, his virtuosity springs to life on originals."

The Chicago Tribune listed Fish Ain't Bitin' as the best blues album of 1997. OC Weekly included the album on its list of the best of the 1990s.

== Track listing ==
No.	Title	Length
1.	"High Fever Blues"
2.	"Frankie and Johnnie"
3.	"Berry Owens Blues"
4.	"Take Me Back"
5.	"Fish Ain't Bitin'"
6.	"Preaching Blues"
7.	"Bumble Bee Blues"
8.	"God Don't Ever Change"
9.	"5-0 Blues"
10.	"Mama Got Worried"
11.	"Worried Life Blues"
12.	"High Fever Blues (Solo Version)"
13.	"Jack o'Diamonds"
14.	"If You Leave Me"
15.	"Moosemilk Blues"
16.	"You've Got to Move"
17.	"Clean Rag"
