= Sporting song =

Type of folk song

A sporting song is a folk song which celebrates fox hunting, horse racing, gambling and other recreations.

Although songs about boxers and successful racehorses were common in the nineteenth century, few are performed by current singers. In particular fox-hunting is considered politically incorrect. The most famous song about a foxhunter, "D'ye ken John Peel" was included in The National Song Book in 1906 and is now often heard as a marching tune. A. L. Lloyd recorded two EPs of sporting ballads; "Bold Sportsmen All" (1958) and "Gamblers and Sporting Blades (Songs of the Ring and the Racecourse)" (1962). The High Level Ranters and Martin Wyndham-Read recorded an album called "English Sporting Ballads" in 1977. Logan English recorded an album American Gambling Songs in the 1950s. John Jacob Niles recorded American Folk and Gambling Songs. The Prospect Before Us (1976) by The Albion Dance Band contains two rarely heard hunting songs.

In the UK, The Watersons are the best-known performers of hunting songs. They sang "Dido, Bendigo" and "The White Hare of Howden" on their second album "The Watersons" (1966). The ballad " I'Anson's Racehorse" appears on A Yorkshire Garland (1966). Steeleye Span recorded "The Hills of Greenmore", an Irish fox-hunting song on their first album. "Skewball" is a song about a racehorse. Notable versions include those by Woody Guthrie, Peter, Paul and Mary, Lonnie Donegan, Steeleye Span and Joan Baez. "Morrisey and the Russian Sailor" (Roud 2150) recounts a Bare-knuckle boxing match between an Irishman and a Russian. As a folk-song it has been found in Ireland, the USA, Canada and Australia. It has been recorded by Joe Heaney. A well-known Irish reel "The Foxhunter" was recorded as an instrumental by The Chieftains, Lúnasa and many others.

Gambling songs often present the situation from the point of view of a repentant, aging gambler, looking back on his wasted life. The most famous such song is "The House of the Rising Sun". Lonnie Donegan recorded "Gamblin' Man" as the B-side to "Putting on the Style" and took "Jack O' Diamonds" to number 1 in the UK in 1957. Other games such as tennis, boating and croquet were middle-class pursuits and are not mentioned in folk-songs. However, a collection of Victorian and Edwardian parlour songs, Play the Game was recorded by Ian Partridge, Peter Savidge and Jennifer Partridge with The Song and Supper Club in 2001. Whaling could be considered a type of hunting, but whaling songs are usually classed as sea shanties.

The obvious successors to these songs are football songs, but they rarely describe actual matches. There are a number of Irish songs written by amateur songwriters from Ireland which celebrate notable achievements in hurling and Gaelic football. Rugby songs tend to be obscene. Country music songs such as "Those Gambler’s Blues” (1930) by Jimmie Rodgers continue the tradition of lamenting the effect of gambling.

== External references ==
- Morrisey and the Russian Sailor
- John Jacob Niles Gambling songs

== See also ==
- Football chant
