= Hot House (composition) =

Jazz composition by Tadd Dameron

"Hot House" is a bebop standard, composed by American jazz musician Tadd Dameron in 1945. Its harmonic structure is identical to Cole Porter's "What Is This Thing Called Love?" (see contrafact). The tune was made famous by Dizzy Gillespie and Charlie Parker as a quintet arrangement and become synonymous with those musicians; "Hot House" became an anthem of the bebop movement in American jazz. The most famous and referred to recording of the tune is by Parker and Gillespie on the May 1953 live concert recording entitled Jazz at Massey Hall, after previously recording it for Savoy records in 1945 and at Carnegie Hall in 1947. The tune continues to be a favorite among jazz musicians and enthusiasts:

- In 1962, Bud Powell recorded it on his Bouncing with Bud album for Delmark records
- In 1964, Charles McPherson played it with Carmell Jones on his Prestige album Bebop Revisited! for the Prestige label
- In 1976, Barry Harris who was the pianist on the 1964 version played a trio version on his Barry Harris Plays Tadd Dameron - Xanadu Records
- In 1982, Chaka Khan covered the tune as part of "Be Bop Medley," on her album Chaka Khan.
- In 1988, Emily Remler was the first jazz guitarist to record it, on her album East To Wes. According to the liner notes by Nat Hentoff the composition was one of Remler's favorites from the Be-bop era.
- In 1990, Mal Waldron & Steve Lacy covered the tune on their album Hot House.
- In 1998, trumpeter Arturo Sandoval covered the tune on his big band album Hot House.
- In 1999, guitarist Larry Coryell covered the tune on his album Private Concert.
- In 2001 it was arranged for big band for Warner Brothers Publications; this was recorded later on the big band CD Up Your Brass.
- In 2010, tenor saxophonist James Moody performed the tune on his Grammy-winning final recording Moody 4B.

== See also ==
- List of jazz contrafacts
