= Sheryl Bailey =

American jazz guitarist and educator (born 1966)

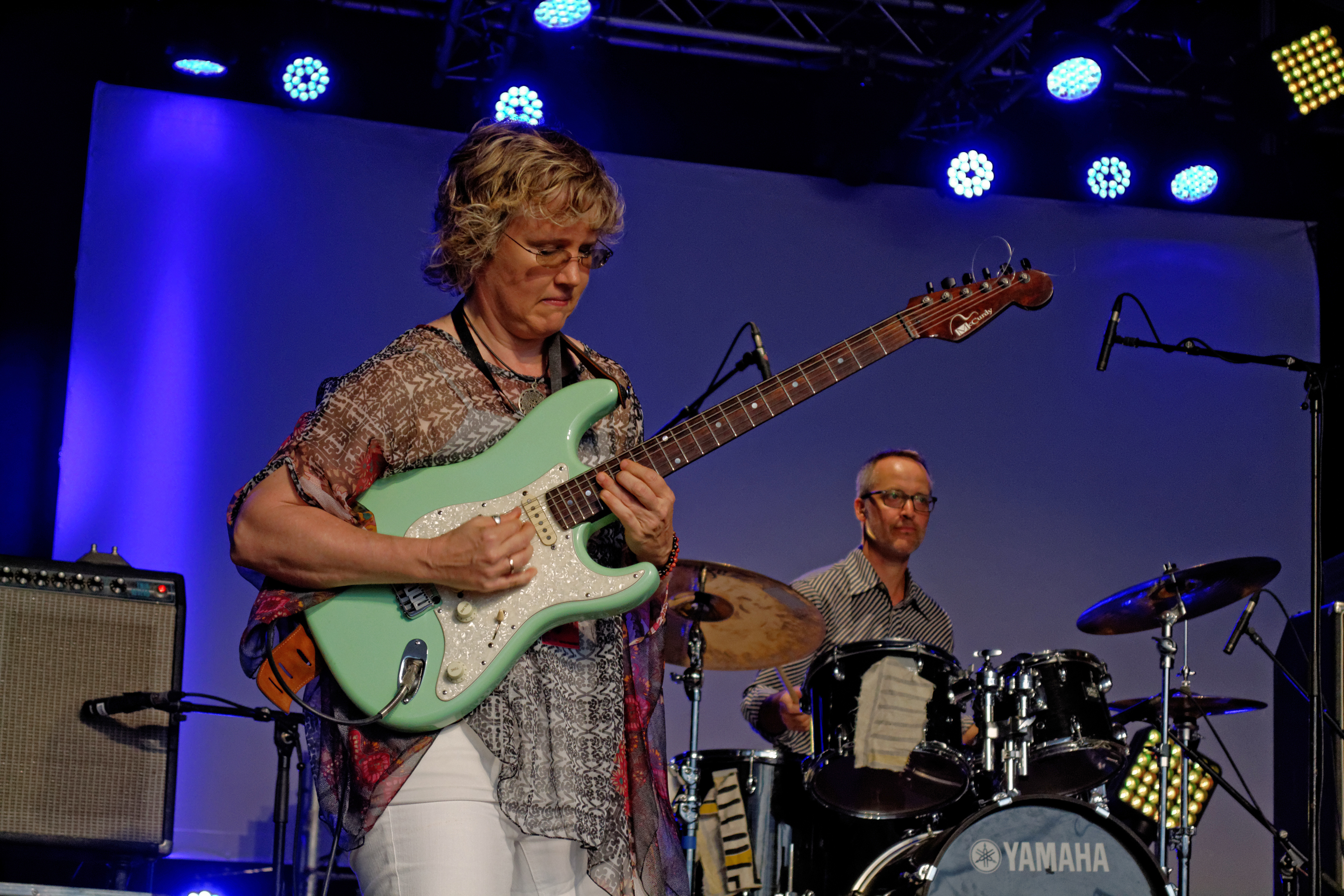
- Bailey with David Krakauer, Festival de Cornouaille, Quimper, Brittany, 2014

Background information
- Born: May 20, 1966 (age 59); Pittsburgh, Pennsylvania, U.S.
- Genres: Jazz
- Occupation: Musician
- Instrument: Guitar
- Labels: Orchard, Pure, MCG Jazz, Whaling City Sound
- Website: www.sherylbailey.com

Sheryl Bailey (born May 20, 1966) is an American jazz guitarist and educator. She teaches guitar at the Berklee College of Music in Boston.

== Biography ==
Bailey grew up in Pittsburgh, Pennsylvania, and started playing guitar at 13. At first she was primarily interested in rock music, but she discovered jazz after hearing guitarist Wes Montgomery on the radio. She attended Berklee College of Music in Boston, and after college she taught music at Towson State University in Baltimore. In 1998, she moved to New York City to pursue a career as a performer. She released her first album, Little Misunderstood, in 1995 with George Colligan, Vince Loving, and Chris Battistone. In 2001, Bailey she released Reunion of Souls with guitarist Chris Bergson, Ashley Turner, and Sunny Jain. Stewart Mason of Allmusic called one of the tracks "charming" and one "perfectly sweet" but said the album was "nothing groundbreaking". This was followed in 2002 by The Power of 3, which contained eight tracks all written by Bailey. Allmusic's Rick Anderson said that each track was "a gem" and "more complex than you'd guess at first listen". He said the album was "highly recommended". Her next album was Bull's Eye! in 2004.

In 2006, Bailey released Live @ The Fat Cat and was a headline act at the Pittsburgh Jazz Festival. Her sixth album, A New Promise, was released by MCG Jazz on February 2, 2010, and was a tribute to jazz guitarist Emily Remler.

In the August 10 edition of DownBeat, reviewer Phillip Booth called Bailey "one of the new greats of her chosen instrument". She has taught at Berklee, summer workshops at Stanford University, and the Collective School of Music in New York City.

== Discography ==
=== As leader ===
Year released	Title	Label	Personnel/Notes
1995	Little Misunderstood	Oasis Productions Limited	With George Colligan (keyboards), Glenn Cashman (tenor sax), Chris Battistone (trumpet), Vince Loving (electric bass), Dave Ephross (acoustic bass), Jon Seligman (drums), Lenny Robinson (drums), and Rob White (percussion).
2001	Reunion Souls	PureMusic Records	With Chris Bergson (guitar), Ashley Turner (bass) and Sunny Jain (drums).
2002	The Power Of 3	PureMusic Records	With Gary Versace (Hammond B-3 organ) and Ian Froman (drums).
2004	Bull’s Eye	PureMusic Records	With Gary Versace (Hammond B-3 organ) and Ian Froman (drums).
2006	Live At The Fat Cat	PureMusic Records	With Gary Versace (Hammond B-3 organ) and Ian Froman (drums).
2010	A New Promise	MCG Jazz	With "Three Rivers Jazz Orchestra": Mike Tomaro (co-director, soprano and alto saxophones); Jim Guerra (alto saxophone); Eric DeFade (tenor saxophone); Rick Matt (tenor saxophone); Jim Germann (baritone saxophone); Steve Hawk (co-director, lead trumpet); Joe Herndon (trumpet); Steve McKnight (trumpet); James Moore (trumpet); Ralph Guzzi (trumpet); Reggie Watkins (lead trombone); Clayton DeWalt (trombone); Ross Garin (trombone); Christopher Carson (bass trombone); Paul Thompson (bass); David Glover (drums). Special guests: Jay Ashby (trombone, percussion); Marty Ashby (acoustic guitar); Hendrick Meurkens (vibes).
2013	A Meeting Of Minds	Cellar live Records	With Ron Oswanski (Hammond B-3 organ) and Ian Froman (drums).
2015	Plucky Strum	Whaling City Sound	With Harvie S (bass)
2017	Plucky Strum Departure	Whaling City Sound	With Harvey S (bass)
