= Equipoise (Larry Coryell album) =

Studio album by Larry Coryell
- Released: 1986
- Recorded: January 8, 1985
- Studio: Van Gelder Studio, Englewood Cliffs, New Jersey
- Genre: Jazz
- Length: 38:35
- Label: Muse
- Producer: Joe Fields

Larry Coryell chronology
A Quiet Day in Spring (1985)	Equipoise (1986)	Together (1986)

Equipoise is an album by guitarist Larry Coryell which was recorded in 1985 and released on the Muse label.

Professional ratings
Review scores
Source	Rating
AllMusic	4/5 stars

== Track listing ==
All compositions by Larry Coryell except where noted

1. "Unemployed Floyd" – 6:50
2. "Tender Tears" – 8:07
3. "Equipoise" (Stanley Cowell) – 4:43
4. "Christina" (Buster Williams) – 5:15
5. "Joy Spring" (Clifford Brown) – 6:41
6. "First Things First" – 6:59

== Personnel ==
- Larry Coryell – guitar
- Stanley Cowell – piano
- Buster Williams – bass
- Billy Hart – drums
- Pamela Sklar – flute (track 1)
