= This Is Me (Emily Remler album) =

Studio album by Emily Remler
- Released: October 19, 1990
- Recorded: 1990
- Studio: Ocean Way Studios (Hollywood, CA); Skyline Studios (New York City, NY)
- Genre: Jazz, jazz fusion
- Length: 54:18
- Label: Justice Records
- Producer: Jeffrey Weber

Emily Remler chronology
East to Wes (1988)	This Is Me (1990)	Cookin' at the Queens: Live in Las Vegas 1984 & 1988 (2024)

This Is Me is the seventh studio album by jazz guitarist Emily Remler. It was her first excursion into electric jazz-pop and her last recording, completed shortly before her death. It is an ambitious production in which up to 14 musicians participated at the 11 original Remler cuts that make up this work.

== Reception ==
Professional ratings
Review scores
Source	Rating
AllMusic	3/5 stars
The Rolling Stone Jazz & Blues Album Guide	4/5 stars
The Virgin Encyclopedia of Jazz	3/5 stars

AllMusic praised Remler's "musical integrity" and "the warm and lyrical nature of her playing."

Jazz musician and critic Leonard Feather questioned how much of the album had been "shaped by [Remler's] arrangers or co-writers (David Benoit, Russ Freeman et al) and whether she really felt this was her finest hour."

Jesse Sendejas Jr. of the Houston Press wrote that the album's "11 tracks showcase [Remler's] versatility," and stated: "Especially against the crossover-ready frameworks of the songs, you can hear every sound Remler studied over the years, her interpretations of all she took in while falling in love with jazz at Berklee or from playing in dimly-lit New Orleans music halls."

Gear Diary's Michael Anderson commented: "This is my absolute favorite recording of hers – she brings the chops, vision, harmonic technique, compositional acumen and style of East to Wes fully to bear in a new realm – and the results are one of the best albums of the genre. The melodies are catchy, solos are inventive, and best of all – it is more guitar-centric than ever without being an ego trip."

== Track listing ==
All compositions by Emily Remler

No.	Title	Length
1.	"Deep in a Trance"	5:24
2.	"Majestic Dance"	4:49
3.	""E" Samba"	6:15
4.	"Love Colors"	4:50
5.	"Dark Passage"	4:46
6.	"You Know What I'm Saying"	4:51
7.	"Song For Maggie"	5:37
8.	"Around The Bend"	5:11
9.	"Carenia"	6:18
10.	"Simplicidaje"	4:53
11.	"Second Childhood"	3:24

== Personnel ==
- Emily Remler – guitar (1–9, 11), guitar synthesizer (10)
- David Benoit – keyboards (1, 4)
- Bill O'Conell – acoustic piano (2, 3, 7, 9, 10)
- Aydin Esen – keyboards (5), acoustic piano (5)
- Russ Freeman – keyboards (6, 8), programming (6, 8)
- Romero Lubambo – acoustic guitar (9, 10)
- Jimmy Johnson – bass (1, 4)
- Lincoln Goines – bass (2, 3, 5, 7, 9, 10)
- Jeff Porcaro – drums (1, 4)
- Ricky Sebastian – drums (2, 3, 5, 7)
- Daduka Fonseca – drums (9, 10)
- Luis Conte – percussion (1, 4, 6, 8, 11)
- Jeffrey Weber – percussion (1, 4)
- Jay Ashby – percussion (2), trombone (3, 5, 7, 9, 10)
- Edson Aparecido da Silva ("Café") – percussion (2, 3, 9, 10)
- Maúcha Adnet – vocals (10)

=== Production ===
- Richard Deutsch – executive producer, management
- Jeffrey Weber – producer
- Clark Germain – recording, mixing (1–9, 11)
- Dan Bosworth – recording assistant
- Francis Manzella – recording assistant
- Katherine Miller – recording assistant
- David Schiffman – recording assistant
- Paul Wickliffe – recording assistant, mixing (10)
- Bernie Grundman – mastering at Bernie Grundman Mastering (Hollywood, California)
- Perry Stevens – guitar technician
- Rubén Esparza – design
- Brian White – illustration
- Marc Norberg – photography
- Joel Marion – photography
