= For All Seasons (Henry Butler album) =

Studio album by Henry Butler
- Released: 1996
- Recorded: 1995
- Genre: Jazz
- Label: Atlantic Jazz

Henry Butler chronology
Blues & More (1992)	For All Seasons (1996)	Blues After Sunset (1998)

For All Seasons is an album by the American musician Henry Butler, released in 1996. Butler supported the album with a North American tour. After touring the album, Butler decided to concentrate more on blues- and New Orleans-based music.

== Production ==
Butler returned to recording in the summer of 1995, after spending several years teaching at Eastern Illinois University. He recorded the album with Herman Jackson on drums and Dave Holland on bass. Steve Turre contributed on trombone. Butler composed five of the album's songs.

== Critical reception ==
Professional ratings
Review scores
Source	Rating
AllMusic	4/5 stars
Chicago Sun-Times	3.5/4 stars
Fort Worth Star-Telegram	4/5 stars
The Rolling Stone Jazz & Blues Album Guide	4.5/5 stars

The Chicago Tribune wrote that "the dizzying right-hand virtuosity that Butler offers on the opening track, 'Blues for All Seasons', the unconventionally aggressive rhythms he brings to Antonio Carlos Jobim's 'How Insensitive' and the rambunctious, technically audacious solo he plays on 'St. Louis Blues' place Butler among the top jazz pianists working today." The St. Louis Post-Dispatch determined that Butler "has a very rich and personal sound (strongly blues-'n'-bop-based), although one hears influences of such well-known pianists as Ahmad Jamal."

The Star Tribune said that "Butler has the amazing facility to spin a variety of melodic and rhythmic lines at once, as if each hand had a brain." The Fort Worth Star-Telegram concluded that Butler mixes "a loose, fast-forward stride style with the focus and intelligence of a committed jazzman."

AllMusic called the album "one of Butler's strongest jazz dates and finds him displaying his individuality on basic but viable chord structures."

== Track listing ==
No.	Title	Length
1.	"Blues for All Seasons"
2.	"How Insensitive"
3.	"St. Louis Blues"
4.	"A Winter's Blues"
5.	"Souvenir d'un Amour"
6.	"Without a Song"
7.	"Spring Jam"
8.	"Love in Autumn"
