= Concord Jazz Festival =

Annual event in Concord, California, US

Coordinates: 37.95907°N 121.938219°W

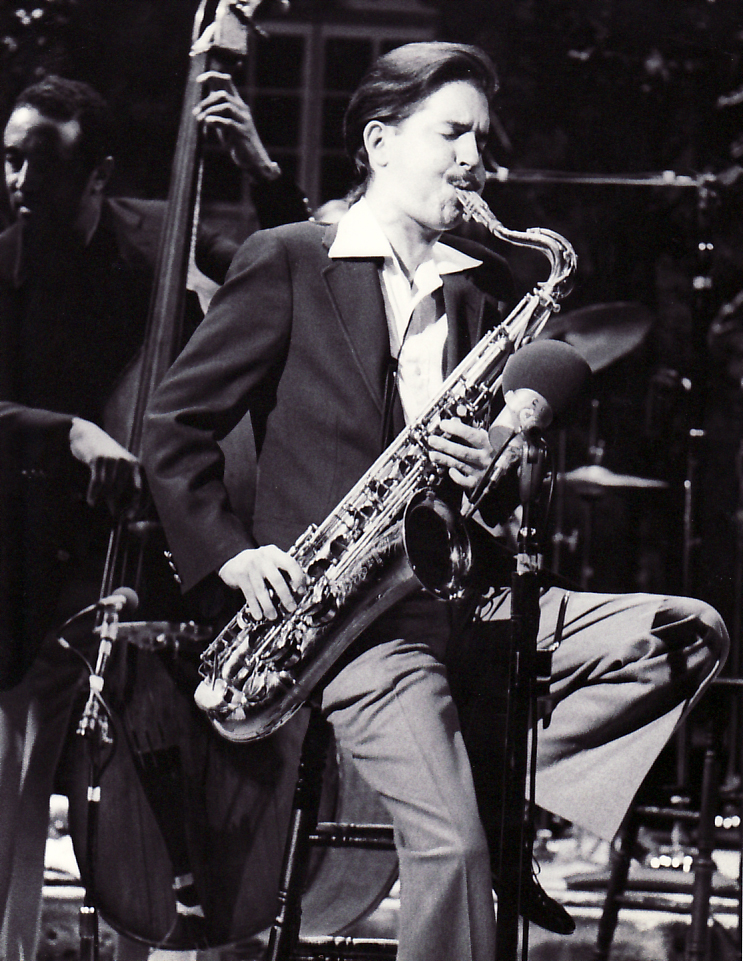
Scott Hamilton (sax) and Ray Brown (bass) at the festival in 1979

The Concord Jazz Festival is an annual event that was established in 1969 in Concord, California.

The festival was launched by Carl Jefferson, a car dealer and jazz enthusiast, who managed to get a group of friends to support the concept. The city agreed to pay for half the cost. The first festival was held on 26 January 1969 in an 8-acre park called the Concord Boulevard Neighborhood Park (later renamed Dave Brubeck Park), adjacent to Concord High School. It attracted 17,000 attendees. Performers in subsequent years included Oscar Peterson, Pearl Bailey, Peter Nero, George Shearing, Ella Fitzgerald, Gerry Mulligan, and Dave Brubeck. In May 1975 the Concord Pavilion was opened as a home for the festival. It is an amphitheater in the Concord hills, featuring a roofed area with no walls that covers 3,500 seats, plus room for 4,500 more on the surrounding lawns. The pavilion is used for many other purposes.

Carl Jefferson founded Concord Records in 1973, with the Concord Jazz label. In 2004 the Concord Music Group was formed by the merger of Concord Records with Fantasy Records. The labels have released many classic albums.

== Live recordings ==
A few of the live recordings that have been made at the festival:

- Seven, Come Eleven by jazz guitarists Herb Ellis and Joe Pass, 29 July 1973
- "The L.A. Four Scores!" The L.A. Four, 1975
- Sugarloaf Suite, Charlie Byrd, 1980
- Dynamite "Live" at The Concord Jazz Festival Don Menza (1980)
- The Woody Herman Big Band Live at the Concord Jazz Festival 1981, with Stan Getz.
- "Concord on a Summer Night" by The Dave Brubeck Quartet, 8 August 1982, on the Concord Jazz label, with liner notes by Carl Jefferson.
- Live at the 1990 Concord Jazz Festival Third Set Ernestine Anderson
- Fujitsu-Concord 26th Jazz Festival, Charlie Byrd and various artists, 1995.
