= Steve Reynolds (sound engineer) =

American audio engineer and record producer

Steve Reynolds is an American, New Orleans–based audio engineer and record producer. Formerly a co-owner of Ultrasonic Studios, Reynolds has worked with such artists as Rebirth Brass Band, Irma Thomas, Troy "Trombone Shorty" Andrews, Kermit Ruffins, and The Radiators. In 2004, under the name of Tangle Eye, Reynolds and fellow New Orleans producer Scott Billington created Alan Lomax's Southern Journey Remixed, a funk, hip-hop, and bluegrass remix of Alan Lomax's recordings for the Library of Congress.

Reynolds now works as an instructor at NOCCA|Riverfront for their media arts program and as a freelance engineer around New Orleans. In 2007, he won a Best Contemporary Blues Album Grammy for engineering Irma Thomas's After the Rain.
