= Mississippi to Mali =

Studio album by Corey Harris
- Released: 2003
- Recorded: between March 2002 & September 2003
- Genre: Blues, reggae
- Length: 64:57
- Label: Rounder

Corey Harris chronology
Downhome Sophisticate (2002)	Mississippi to Mali (2003)	Daily Bread (2005)

Professional ratings
Review scores
Source	Rating
AllMusic	4.5/5 stars
The Penguin Guide to Blues Recordings	3.5/4 stars

Mississippi to Mali is an album by Corey Harris. It was released in 2003 through Rounder Records.

== Track listing ==
1. "Coahoma" (Harris) - 1:49
2. "Big Road Blues" (Traditional) - 3:05
3. "Special Rider Blues" (James) - 4:54
4. "Tamalah" (Toure) - 6:41
5. "Back Atcha" (Thomas) - 3:27
6. "Rokie" (Traditional) - 3:46
7. "La Chanson des Bozos" (Traditional) - 4:20
8. "Mr. Turner" (Harris) - 4:43
9. "Cypress Grove Blues" (James) - 3:02
10. "Station Blues" (Traditional) - 2:41
11. ".44 Blues" (Traditional) - 7:28
12. "Njarka" (Toure) - 3:56
13. "Charlene" (Harris) - 5:01
14. "Catfish Blues" (Petway) - 6:39
15. "Dark Was the Night, Cold Was the Ground" (Johnson) - 3:28
