= Marty Ashby =

American jazz guitarist

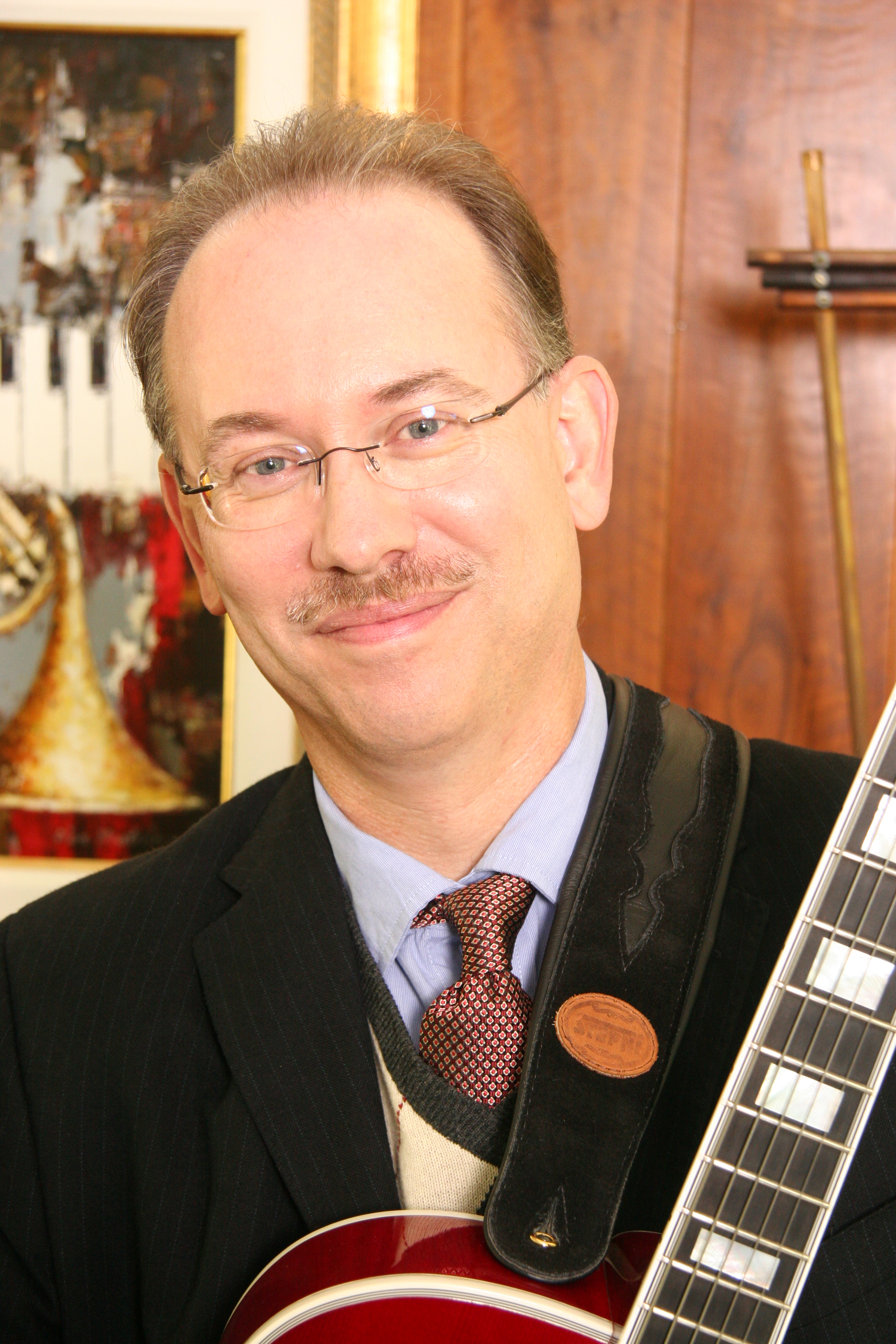

Background information
- Born: Baldwinsville, New York
- Genres: Jazz
- Occupations: Musician, producer
- Instrument: Guitar
- Labels: Manchester Craftsmen's Guild
- Website: martyashby.com

Marty Ashby is a music producer, concert organizer, and jazz guitarist. Since 1987 he has been the executive producer of MCG Jazz, a program of the Manchester Craftsmen's Guild, where he has produced more than 2,000 concerts and 40 recordings on the MCG Jazz label, including five Grammy Award winners. He has also performed with a number of jazz groups and is an adjunct professor at Oberlin College.

== Early life ==
Ashby grew up in Baldwinsville, New York. He began playing guitar at age seven, and a year later was performing in his family's band, 'The Ashby Family'. After graduating from high school in three years, Ashby attended the Ithaca College music program on scholarship at age 16. During his time at university, Ashby helped to produce several local jazz festivals.

== Career ==
In 1982 Ashby moved to New York City. He held three jobs and worked as a musician for a variety of performing arts groups including The Cleveland Orchestra, Ohio Ballet, National Symphony and finally The Pittsburgh Symphony Orchestra. He also worked at small scale jazz events and festivals.

In 1987 Ashby left the Pittsburgh Symphony and founded MCG Jazz, a program of the Manchester Craftsmen's Guild. He has since produced about 2,000 concerts, including jazz concert series and one-time events, as well as developed youth jazz education and outreach projects.

In 1994 Ashby co-founded the MCG Jazz label with Bill Strickland, and has since produced about 40 recordings, including five GRAMMY Award winners and a series of educational DVDs produced from the MCG archive collection. Artists produced by Ashby include Sheryl Bailey and Nancy Wilson.

As a guitarist, Ashby performed and recorded with Slide Hampton, Claudio Roditi, Nancy Wilson, Paquito D'Rivera, Herbie Mann, Phil Woods, The Dizzy Gillespie All-Star Big Band. In 2010 he conducted and performed for as part of the Pittsburgh's 21st Century Swing Band's album, Pittsburgh Jazz Legacy.

Ashby has acted as artistic advisor and producer for jazz concerts and festivals around the United States, including the Animal Crackers jazz series in Racine, Wisconsin, Jazz on the Circle at Severance Hall in Cleveland, Ohio, and the Jazz at Seven Springs Festival in Champion, Pennsylvania.

Ashby is an adjunct professor at Oberlin Conservatory of Music at Oberlin College where he teaches a Business of Jazz course to jazz performance majors and the Mary Pappert School of Music at Duquesne University. In September 2012, Ashby was presented with the Century Club Award. He is also a member of the National Academy of Recording Arts and Sciences (NARAS), the Latin Academy of Recording Arts and Sciences (LARAS) and a member of the Society of American Magicians (SAM). Ashby is the EPP Goldman-Sachs fellow at the National Museum of American History (NMAH).

As of 2017, Ashby continues to be the executive producer of MCG Jazz. He was named as Pittsburgh's 2017 Jazz Hero by the Jazz Journalists Association.
