= Robert Jospé =

American jazz drummer

- Birth name: Robert D. Jospé
- Born: April 17, 1950 (age 74); Manhattan, New York
- Origin: New York, New York
- Genres: jazz, fusion, rock
- Occupation(s): musician, instructor
- Instrument: drums
- Years active: 1969–present
- Labels: Random Chance Records
- Website: www.robertjospe.com

Robert Jospé (born April 17, 1950, in Manhattan, New York) is an American jazz drummer based in Charlottesville, Virginia. His parents were Belgian and had a love of music they passed on to him. Jospé is the band leader and drummer with the band Inner Rhythm, which received positive reviews in the Washington Post.

== Biography ==
=== Early ===
Born in Manhattan on April 17, 1950, Robert Jospé was first inspired by his Belgian parents love of music. He began playing the drums at the age of fourteen. He went on to have his first professional performance in France at sixteen.

=== Education ===
While attending the Cambridge School of Weston in Weston, Massachusetts, Jospé enrolled in the Berklee College of Music summer session and began formal training on drums. Upon graduating from the Cambridge School, Jospé moved to New York City to attend New York University.

In October 2009 Jospé completed the Remo Health Rhythms Facilitators Training Workshop in Princeton, New Jersey.

=== Career ===
Over the subsequent dozen years Jospé performed actively in the New York City music scene, becoming a co-leader of the fusion band Cosmology with Dawn Thompson and John D'earth. He performed with acts like Dave Liebman, John Scofield, and John Abercrombie.

Jospé formed Inner Rhythm in 1990 with a self-titled CD released the same year. Hands On was released in 2004, reaching number four on JazzWeek. The tracks "Time to Play" and "Blue Blaze" received four stars in DownBeat. Random Chance Records released his Heart Beat in 2006. In 2009 Inner Rhythm released the EP Inner Rhythm Now!

In addition to his many public appearances, Jospé and his group have played numerous private events and house concerts — including a performance with Tony Bennett in Germany in 2004.

== Robert Jospé Express ==
The Robert Jospé Express formed in 2012 when the former keyboard player for the Dave Matthews Band, Butch Taylor, began playing gigs at Fellini's in Charlottesville. Bassist Dane Alderson joined the band a few months later. In October 2014 the group released a double CD entitled Classics. The track "Doin'It Up" included guitarist Brian Mesko.

== University of Virginia ==
In 1989 Jospé joined the University of Virginia music department faculty. He teaches jazz drumming and a rhythmic fluency course he's titled "Learn to Groove". He performs with UVA faculty jazz ensemble The Free Bridge Quintet. Jospé contributed to the online educational component of Jazz by UVA with fellow instructor Scott DeVeaux and jazz writer Gary Giddins.

== Grants ==
Since 1992 Jospé has received an annual grant from the Virginia Commission for the Arts for The World Beat Workshop, his "educational, interactive, lecture/demonstration". The program highlights history and styles of African-influenced dance music throughout the Americas. Robert has also received funding through the Virginia Museum of Fine Arts.

== Rhythm and Resilience ==
Jospé created Rhythm and Resilience as a pilot program In 2009 with Tussi Kluge. The program was designed to improve the well-being of participants through mindfulness and drumming. Jospé began leading classes at the Albemarle-Charlottesville Regional Jail. Rhythm and Resilience was offered monthly to the public as a free community program funded by the Kluge Foundation.

== Honors, awards, distinctions ==
- Jospé was awarded Artist, Educator of the Year, by Charlottesville Jazz Society in 2012.
- Jospé has been featured in Jazz Times Magazine, Modern Drummer, UVAMagazine.org, and The Savvy Musician.
