= Emily Remler =

American jazz guitarist (1957–1990)

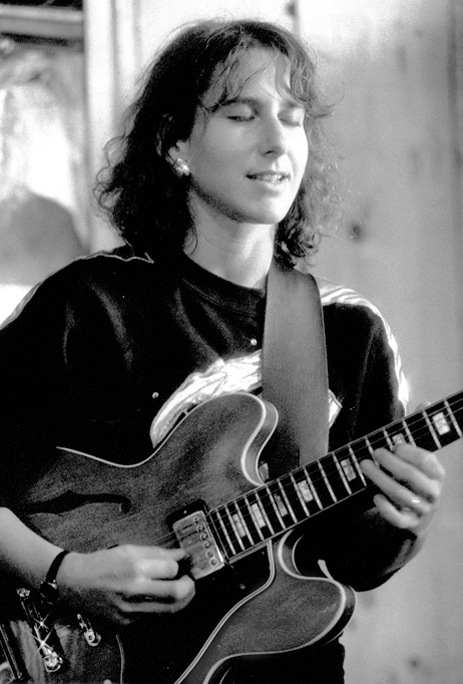
- Remler in 1984

Background information
- Born: September 18, 1957; Englewood Cliffs, New Jersey, U.S.
- Died: May 4, 1990 (aged 32) Sydney, Australia
- Genres: Jazz
- Occupation: Musician
- Instrument: Guitar
- Years active: 1976–1990
- Label: Concord Jazz

Emily Remler (September 18, 1957 – May 4, 1990) was an American jazz guitarist, bandleader and composer active from the late 1970s until her death in 1990.

== Early life and influences ==
Born in Englewood Cliffs, New Jersey, Remler began playing guitar at age ten. She listened to pop and rock guitarists like Jimi Hendrix and Johnny Winter. At the Berklee College of Music in the 1970s, she listened to jazz guitarists Charlie Christian, Wes Montgomery, Herb Ellis, Pat Martino, and Joe Pass.

Her primary source of inspiration was Wes Montgomery, as said by her former boyfriend at the time guitarist Steve Masakowski, “She spent a lot of time trying to develop the thumb technique, and playing octaves.”

== Career ==
Remler settled in New Orleans, where she played in blues and jazz clubs, working with bands such as Four Play and Little Queenie and the Percolators before beginning her recording career in 1981. She was praised by jazz guitarist Herb Ellis, who referred to her as "the new superstar of guitar" and introduced her at the Concord Jazz Festival in 1978.

In a 1982 interview with People magazine, she said: "I may look like a nice Jewish girl from New Jersey, but inside I'm a 50-year-old, heavy-set black man with a big thumb, like Wes Montgomery."

Her first album as a band leader, Firefly, gained positive reviews, as did Take Two and Catwalk. She recorded Together with guitarist Larry Coryell. She participated in the Los Angeles version of Sophisticated Ladies from 1981 to 1982 and toured for several years with Astrud Gilberto. She also made two guitar instruction videos.

In 1985, she won Guitarist of the Year in Down Beat magazine's international poll, and performed in that year's guitar festival at Carnegie Hall. In 1988, she was artist-in-residence at Duquesne University and the next year received the Distinguished Alumni award from Berklee. Bob Moses, the drummer on Transitions and Catwalk, said, "Emily had that loose, relaxed feel. She swung harder and simpler. She didn't have to let you know that she was a virtuoso in the first five seconds."

Remler married Jamaican jazz pianist Monty Alexander in 1981; the marriage ended in 1984. Thereafter, she had a brief relationship with Coryell following her first divorce.

Her first guitar was her brother's Gibson ES-330. She played a Borys B120 hollow-body electric towards the end of the 1980s. Her acoustic guitars included a 1984 Collectors Series Ovation and a nylon-string Korocusci classical guitar that she used for bossa nova.

When asked how she wanted to be remembered she remarked, "Good compositions, memorable guitar playing and my contributions as a woman in music...but the music is everything, and it has nothing to do with politics or the women's liberation movement."

== Death ==
Remler suffered longstanding opioid use disorder, which is believed to have contributed to her death. In May, 1990, she died of heart failure at the age of 32 while on tour in Australia.

Remler is buried in Block 4, Row 2, Grave 18 (Section 2, Field of Ephron) at New Montefiore Cemetery, New York.

== Tributes ==
The album Just Friends: A Gathering in Tribute to Emily Remler, Volume 1 (Justice Records JR 0502-2) was released in 1990, and Volume 2 (JR 0503-2) followed in 1991. Performers from these two albums included guitarists Herb Ellis, Leni Stern, Marty Ashby, and Steve Masakowski; bassists Eddie Gómez, Lincoln Goines, and Steve Bailey; drummer Marvin "Smitty" Smith; pianists Bill O'Connell and David Benoit; and saxophonist Nelson Rangell, among others.

David Benoit wrote the song "6-String Poet", from his album Inner Motion (GRP, 1990), as a tribute to Remler.

The 1995 book Madame Jazz: Contemporary Women Instrumentalists by Leslie Gourse includes a posthumous chapter on Remler, based on interviews conducted while she was alive.

In 2002, West Coast guitarist Skip Heller recorded with his quartet a song called "Emily Remler" in her memory, released as track No. 5 on his record Homegoing (Innova Recordings).

Jazz guitarist Sheryl Bailey's 2010 album A New Promise was a tribute to Emily Remler. Aged 18, Bailey first saw Remler perform, at the University of Pittsburgh Jazz Festival in 1984 - she was inspired to take her own guitar studies. Bailey said "She paved the way for me. ... I really wanted to hear Emily's person in me when I played. It meant a lot to me to do this tribute and pay homage to her and to say thank you." On the album, Bailey collaborated with Pittsburgh's Three Rivers Jazz Orchestra and producer Marty Ashby on eight tracks, including three composed by Remler ("East to Wes", "Mocha Spice", and "Carenia").

An upcoming documentary about her entitled Firefly: The Emily Remler Story has been slated for release in 2027. Directed by Al Naffah and produced by Aletheian Pictures in co-operation with Berklee College of Music, Musicians Institute and the Emily Remler Estate, the film features rare archive material including unreleased interviews with Emily herself and contributions by Sheryl Bailey, Martin Taylor (guitarist), Emily Roberts, Bob Moses (musician), John D'earth, Marty Ashby, Jennifer Batten, Robert Jospé, Mimi Fox, Bill Milkowski, Jocelyn Gould and others.

== Discography ==
=== As leader/co-leader ===
Year released	Title	Label	Personnel/Notes
1981	Firefly	Concord	With Hank Jones (piano), Bob Maize (bass) and Jake Hanna (drums)
1982	Take Two	Concord	With James Williams (piano), Don Thomson (bass) and Terry Clarke (drums).
1983	Transitions	Concord	With John D'earth (trumpet), Eddie Gomez (bass) and Bob Moses (drums).
1985	Catwalk	Concord	With John D'earth (trumpet), Eddie Gomez (bass) and Bob Moses (percussion).
1985	Together	Concord	With Larry Coryell.
1988	East to Wes	Concord	With Hank Jones (piano), Buster Williams (bass) and Marvin "Smitty" Smith (drums).
1990	This Is Me	Justice	With David Benoit (keyboards), Jimmy Johnson and Lincoln Goines (bass), Luis Conte, Edson Aparecido da Silva "Café" and Jeffrey Weber (percussion), Jay Ashby (percussion and trombone), Jeff Porcaro, Ricky Sebastian and Duduka Da Fonseca (drums), Romero Lubambo (acoustic guitar), Maúcha Adnet (vocals).
2024	Cookin' at the Queens: Live in Las Vegas 1984 & 1988	Resonance	With Cocho Arbe (piano), Carson Smith (bass), Tom Montgomery and John Pisci (drums).

=== As guest ===
Year recorded	Leader	Title	Label
1981	The Clayton Brothers	It's All In The Family	Concord
1985	Ray Brown	Soular Energy	Concord
1986	John Colianni	John Colianni	Concord
1986	Rosemary Clooney	Rosemary Clooney Sings the Music of Jimmy Van Heusen	Concord
1989	David Benoit	Waiting for Spring	GRP
1989	Susannah McCorkle	No More Blues	Concord
1990	Susannah McCorkle	Sabia	Concord
1990	Richie Cole	Bossa International	Milestone

=== Videos ===
- 1990: Bebop and Swing Guitar (VHS, reissued on DVD in 2008)
- 1990: Advanced Jazz and Latin Improvisation (VHS, reissued on DVD in 2008)
- 2005: Sal Salvador, Joe Pass, Mundell Lowe, Charlie Byrd, Emily Remler, Tal Farlow – Learn Jazz Guitar Chords With 6 Great Masters! (DVD, DVD-Video)
- 2005: Emily Remler, Joe Pass, Tuck Andress, Brian Setzer, Joe Beck, Duke Robillard – Learn Jazz Guitar With 6 Great Masters! (DVD, DVD-Video)
