= Bill Milkowski =

American jazz writer (born 1954)

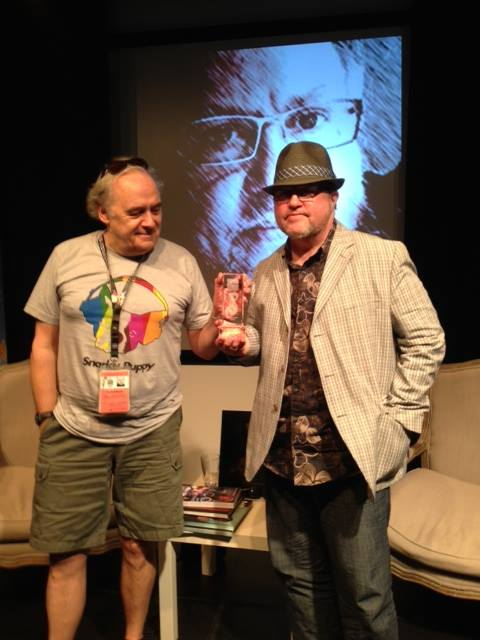
- Milkowski receives the Bruce Lundvall Award from Andre Ménard of the Montreal Jazz Festival.
- Born: September 26, 1954 (age 72); Milwaukee, Wisconsin, U.S.
- Occupation: Journalist
- Years active: 1976–present
- Website: www.billmilkowski.com

Bill Milkowski (born September 26, 1954) is an American jazz critic, journalist, and biographer. Since the 1970s, he has written thousands of articles for magazines and album liner notes. He has written for DownBeat, JazzTimes, Jazziz, The Absolute Sound, Paste, Jazzthing (in Germany), and Guitar Club (in Italy). He is the author of a biography of bassist Jaco Pastorius, a biography of The Rolling Stones guitarist Keith Richards, an annotated history of jive music, a collection of interviews, and a biography of saxophonist-composer Michael Brecker.

In 2018, Milkowski was part of a "Jazz Democracy" panel discussion at the United Nations for International Jazz Day. He received a Lifetime Achievement Award from the Jazz Journalists Association in 2011. He received the Bruce Lundvall Award from the Montreal International Jazz Festival in 2015.

== Biography ==
Born in Milwaukee, Wisconsin, Milkowski studied journalism in college, earning a bachelor's degree in 1977 from the University of Wisconsin–Milwaukee, where he also served as editor of the campus newspaper, the UWM Post. He combined his interests in music and journalism when he began working as freelance music critic at the Milwaukee Journal Sentinel in 1977. He co-published the city's alternative bi-weekly newspaper, Cityside, from December 1977 to May 1979 and served as editor of the monthly Milwaukee magazine from 1979 to 1980. He moved to New York in September 1980 after accepting a position as managing editor for the Long Island-based weekly entertainment publication Good Times, where he worked for two years.

As a New York-based freelance music writer from 1983 to 1993, Milkowski contributed cover stories, interviews, record reviews, and opinion pieces on jazz, rock, and blues musicians for numerous national magazines. In September 1993, he moved to New Orleans, where he continued freelancing for several national music magazines while also appearing weekly as an overnight DJ ("The Milkman") at radio station WWOZ.His first book, JACO: The Extraordinary and Tragic Life of Jaco Pastorius, The World's Greatest Bass Player (Miller-Freeman Books) was published in April 1995 during the week of the birth of his daughter. It was translated for editions in Italy, Spain, Slovakia, France, Bulgaria, and Japan. After returning to New York in 1997, Milkowski published Rockers, Jazzbos & Visionaries (Billboard Books, 1998) and Swing It! An Annotated History of Jive (Billboard Books, 2001). An updated and revised 10th Anniversary Edition of his Jaco Pastorius biography was published in 2005 by Backbeat Books. He wrote Legends of Jazz (White Star Publishers) in 2011 and that same year co-wrote Here And Now: The Autobiography of Pat Martino (Backbeat Books). His book Keith Richards: A Rock 'n' Roll Life (White Star Publishers) came out in 2012. His most recent work is Ode to a Tenor Titan: The Life and Times and Music of Michael Brecker (Backbeat Books).

Milkowski was a consultant on the 2014 documentary film Jaco, produced by Metallica bassist Robert Trujillo, and appeared on panel discussions with its premiere at film festivals in New York City, Washington D.C., Cape May, New Jersey, Montreal, and Buenos Aires.

As a record producer, Milkowski oversaw recordings for guitarist Phil deGruy (Innuendo Out the Other, NYC, 1995), guitarist Pat Martino (All Sides Now, Blue Note, 1998) and produced the compilation Come Together: A Guitar Tribute to The Beatles (NYC, 1993) as well as tracks on the compilations World Christmas (Metro Blue, 1996) and Who Loves You: A Tribute to Jaco Pastorius (JVC, 2001).

== Awards and honors ==
- Helen Oakley Dance-Robert Palmer Award for Excellence in Magazine Writing, Jazz Journalists Association, 2004
- Lifetime Achievement Award, Jazz Journalists Association, 2011
- Bruce Lundvall Award, Montreal International Jazz Festival, 2015

== Bibliography ==
- Bass Heroes: From the Pages of Guitar Player (contributor). Miller Freeman, 1993. ISBN 0-87930-274-7.
- JACO: The Extraordinary and Tragic Life of Jaco Pastorius (1st edition). Miller Freeman, 1995. ISBN 0-8793-0361-1.
- Down Beat: 60 Years of Jazz (contributor). Hal Leonard Books, 1995. ISBN 0-7935-3491-7.
- The Guitar in Jazz (contributor; edited by James Sallis). University of Nebraska Press. 1996. ISBN 0-8032-4250-6.
- Guitar World Presents Stevie Ray Vaughan (contributor). Hal Leonard Books, 1991997. ISBN 0-7935-8080-3.
- Rockers, Jazzbos and Visionaries. Billboard Books, 1998. ISBN 0-8230-7833-7.
- The Oxford Companion to Jazz (contributor; edited by Bill Kirchner). Oxford University Press, 2000. ISBN 0-19-512510-X.
- Swing It! An Annotated History of Jive. Watson-Guptill Publications 2001. ISBN 0-8230-7671-7.
- The Billboard Illustrated Encyclopedia of Music (contributor). Watson-Guptill Publications, 2003. (ISBN) 0-8230-7869-8.
- The Illustrated Encyclopedia of Jazz & Blues (contributor). Flame Tree Publishing, 2005. ISBN 1-84451-181-2.
- JACO: The Extraordinary and Tragic Life of Jaco Pastorius: Deluxe Edition. Backbeat Books, 2005. ISBN 0-87930-859-1.
- Voices in Jazz Guitar (by Joe Barth; foreword by Bill Milkowski). Mel Bay Publications, 2006. ISBN 978-0-7866-7679-8.
- Down Beat: The Great Jazz Interviews: A 75th Anniversary Anthology (contributor). Hal Leonard Books, 2009. ISBN 978-1-4234-6384-9.
- Legends of Jazz [text, Bill Milkowski; foreword, Joe Lovano]. White Star Publishers, 2011. ISBN 978-88-544-0604-9.
- Here and Now! The Autobiography of Pat Martino (co-author). Backbeat Books, 2011. ISBN 978-1617130274.
- Ode to a Tenor Titan: The Life and Times and Music of Michael Brecker. Backbeat Books, 2021 ISBN 9781493053766.
