= Henry Butler =

American musician and educator (1948–2018)

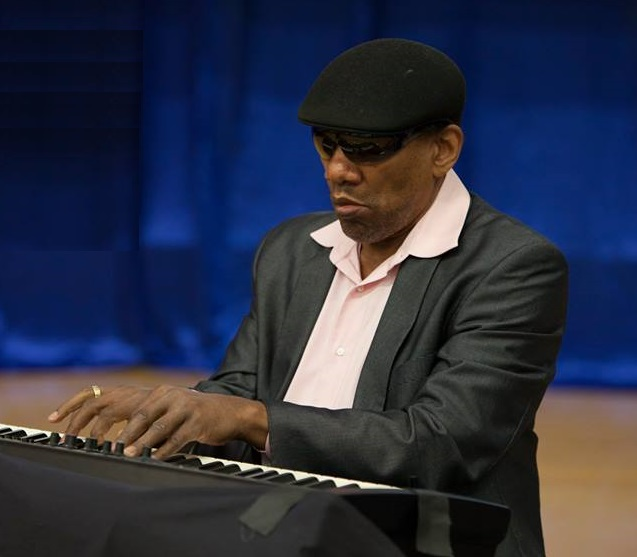
- Butler in 2015

Background information
- Born: September 21, 1948; New Orleans, Louisiana, U.S.
- Died: July 2, 2018 (aged 69) New York City, New York, U.S.
- Genres: Jazz, New Orleans blues
- Occupation: Musician
- Instrument: Piano
- Labels: MCA, Windham Hill, Basin Street

Henry Butler (September 21, 1948 – July 2, 2018) was an American jazz and blues pianist. He learned piano, drums, and saxophone in school. He completed a BA and MA, and taught at the New Orleans Center for Creative Arts. He worked as a soloist and in groups in Los Angeles and New York City. Despite his blindness, he spent time as a photographer and had his work exhibited in galleries.

== Biography ==
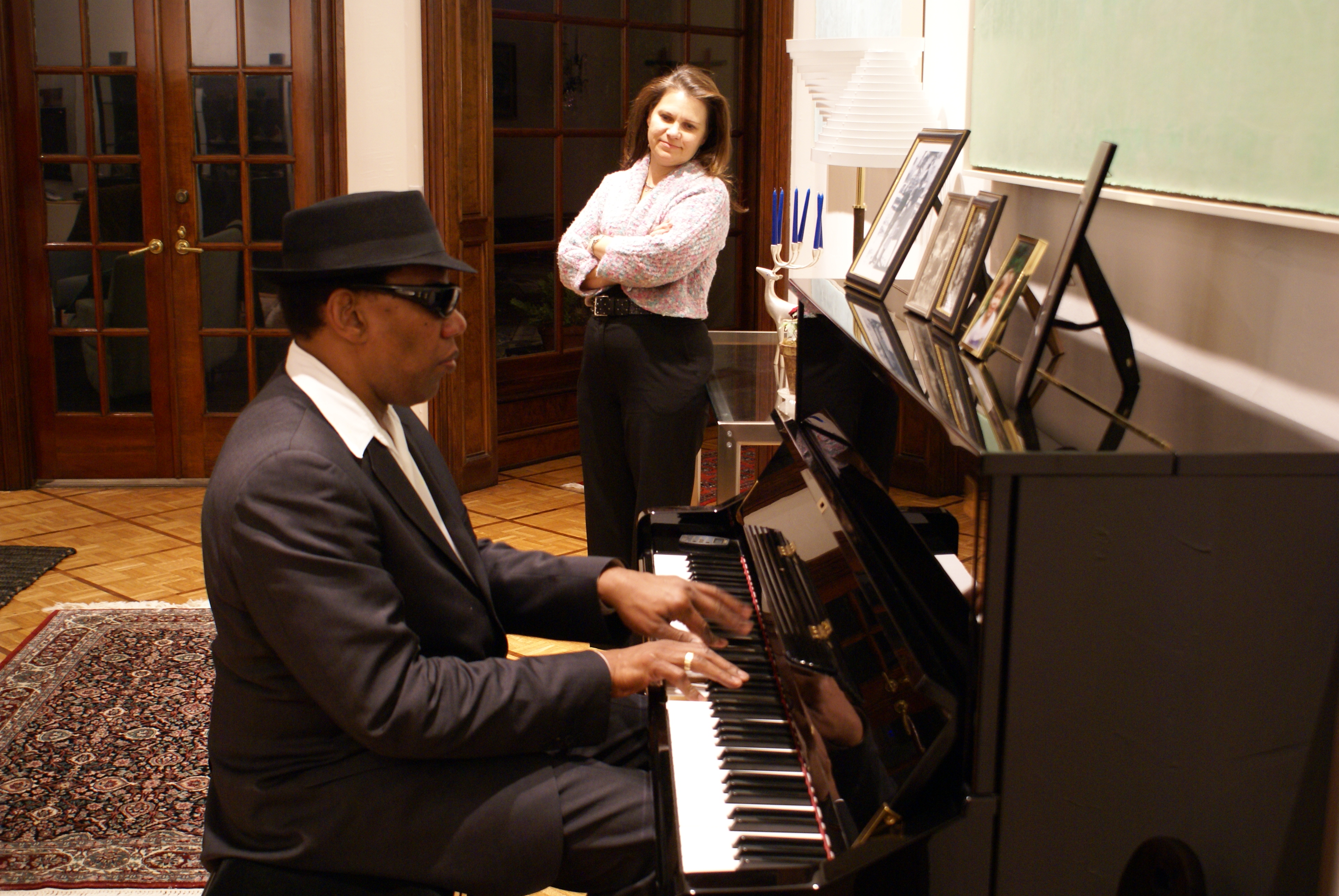
Butler after opening for B.B. King at the Kodak Theatre in Hollywood, California, in January 2007

Butler was born in New Orleans, and was blinded by glaucoma in infancy. His musical training began at the Louisiana State School for the Blind, where he learned to play valve trombone, baritone horn, and drums before concentrating on singing and piano.

Butler was mentored at Southern University in Baton Rouge, Louisiana, by clarinetist and educator Alvin Batiste. Butler later completed a MA (Music) at Michigan State University in 1974 and received a 2009 MSU Distinguished Alumni Award.

He taught at Eastern Illinois University from 1990 to 1996, then he returned to New Orleans. In 1993, he founded a series of jazz camps for blind and visually impaired young musicians, which were featured in a 2010 documentary titled The Music's Gonna Get You Through.

In August 2005, Hurricane Katrina devastated Butler's home in the Gentilly section of New Orleans. His 1925 Mason & Hamlin piano was wrecked by flood waters that rose to nearly eight feet inside his house.

In the wake of Katrina's damage, Butler left New Orleans and moved to Boulder, Colorado, then Denver. He spoke of the Colorado period as "a trying exile". In 2009, Butler moved to New York City.

Beginning in 1984, Butler pursued photography as a hobby after attending art exhibits in Los Angeles and asking friends to describe what they saw. His methods and photos were featured in the HBO2 documentary Dark Light: The Art of Blind Photographers that aired in 2010. Butler's photographs were shown in galleries in New Orleans.

Butler died of cancer in New York City on July 2, 2018, at the age of 69.

== Praise ==
Butler was known for his technique and his ability to play in many styles of music. In 1987, music critic Jon Pareles of The New York Times wrote that Butler "revels in fluency and facility, splashing chords all over the keyboard and streaking through solos with machine-gun articulation". In 1998, critic Howard Reich of the Chicago Tribune described Butler as "an enormous intellect matched by unusual physical strength".

== Discography ==
=== As leader ===
- Fivin' Around (MCA, 1986)
- The Village (MCA, 1987)
- Orleans Inspiration (Windham Hill, 1990)
- Blues & More (Windham Hill, 1992)
- For All Seasons (Atlantic, 1996)
- Blues After Sunset (Black Top, 1998)
- Vu-Du Menz with Corey Harris (Alligator, 2000)
- The Game Has Just Begun (Basin Street, 2002)
- Homeland (Basin Street, 2004)
- Pianola Live (Basin Street, 2008)
- Viper's Drag with Steven Bernstein (Impulse!, 2014)
