= Corey Harris =

American blues and reggae musician (born 1969)

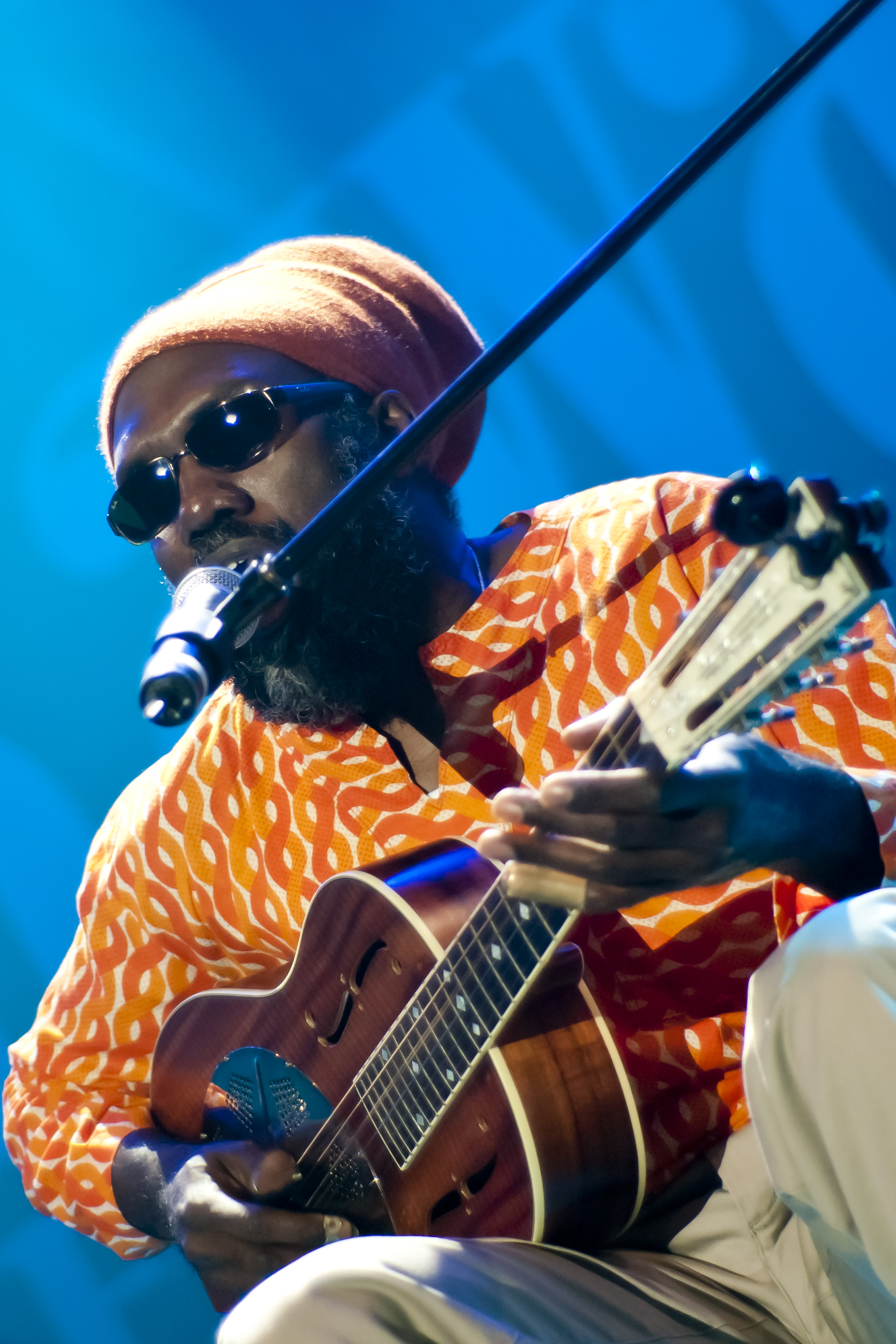

Background information
- Born: February 21, 1969 (age 57); Denver, Colorado, United States
- Genres: Blues, reggae
- Occupation: Musician
- Instruments: Vocals, guitar
- Years active: 1995–present
- Labels: Alligator, Rounder, Telarc
- Members: Chris Whitley (keyboards), Paul Dudley, (drums) Gordon Jones (saxophone), Teresa Jones (bass)
- Website: https://coreyharris.net

Corey Harris (born February 21, 1969) is an American blues and reggae musician, currently living in Charlottesville, Virginia. In the 1990s, along with Keb' Mo' and Alvin Youngblood Hart, he was a prominent acoustic guitar blues player.

== Biography ==
Harris was born and raised near Denver, Colorado. He graduated from Bates College in Lewiston, Maine with a bachelor's degree in 1991, and was awarded an honorary doctorate in 2007. Harris received a Thomas J. Watson Fellowship for language studies in Cameroon in his early twenties, before taking a teaching post in Napoleonville, Louisiana under the Teach For America program. His debut solo album Between Midnight and Day (1995) was produced by Larry Hoffman, who discovered him in 1994 in Helena, Arkansas. The record included covers of Sleepy John Estes, Fred McDowell, Charlie Patton, Muddy Waters, and Bukka White. His second recording with Hoffman, Fish Ain't Bitin', was the recipient of the 1997 W. C. Handy Award for Best Acoustic Blues Album of the Year. Recorded in New Orleans, it featured Harris' original songs, vocal, and guitar backed on certain tracks by a trio of tuba and two trombones arranged by producer Hoffman. In 2002, Harris collaborated with Ali Farka Toure on his album Mississippi to Mali, fusing blues and Toure's music from northern Mali. In 2003, he contributed to the Northern Blues release Johnny's Blues: A Tribute To Johnny Cash.

Harris has lived and traveled widely in West Africa, an influence that has permeated much of his work. Harris has toured worldwide. He has an (electric) band as well; formerly known as the "5 x 5", now it is called The Corey Harris Band. He helped Billy Bragg and Wilco to write the music for "Hoodoo Voodoo" on Mermaid Avenue, an album consisting entirely of songs with lyrics by Woody Guthrie. He also appeared as a musician and vocalist on the album and its sequels, Mermaid Avenue Vol. II and Mermaid Avenue Vol. III.

In 2003, he was featured on the 2003 PBS television mini-series The Blues, in an episode directed by Martin Scorsese.

In September 2007, the John D. and Catherine T. MacArthur Foundation announced that Harris was among 24 people named MacArthur Fellows for 2007.

== Discography ==
=== Solo ===
- 1995: Between Midnight and Day (Alligator)
- 1997: Fish Ain't Bitin' (Alligator)
- 1999: Greens from the Garden (Alligator)
- 2000: Vu-Du Menz with Henry Butler (Alligator)
- 2001: Live at Starr Hill 1/27/01 (Njumba)
- 2002: Downhome Sophisticate (Rounder)
- 2003: Mississippi to Mali (Rounder)
- 2005: Daily Bread (Rounder)
- 2007: Zion Crossroads (Telarc)
- 2009: blu.black (Telarc)
- 2011: Father Sun Mother Earth (Njumba)
- 2012: Motherless Child (with Lutan Fyah)
- 2013: Fulton Blues
- 2013: Rasta Blues Experience Live
- 2014: Fulton Blues (Deluxe Edition)
- 2015: Live! from Turtle Island
- 2016 Live in Vienna
- 2018 Free Water Way
- 2019 Louisa County Blues
- 2024 Chicken Man

=== Contributions to others ===
- 1998: Mermaid Avenue
- 2000: Mermaid Avenue Vol. II
- 2003: Johnny's Blues: A Tribute To Johnny Cash (Northern Blues)
- 2005: Come to the Mountain: Old Time Music for Modern Times
- 2012: Mermaid Avenue Vol. III, issued as part of Mermaid Avenue: The Complete Sessions
