= Concord Jazz =

American record company and label

- Parent company: BMG Rights Management
- Founded: 1973
- Founder: Carl Jefferson
- Distributor: Universal Music (worldwide distribution)
- Genre: Jazz
- Country of origin: U.S.
- Location: Los Angeles, California
- Official website: concordjazz.com

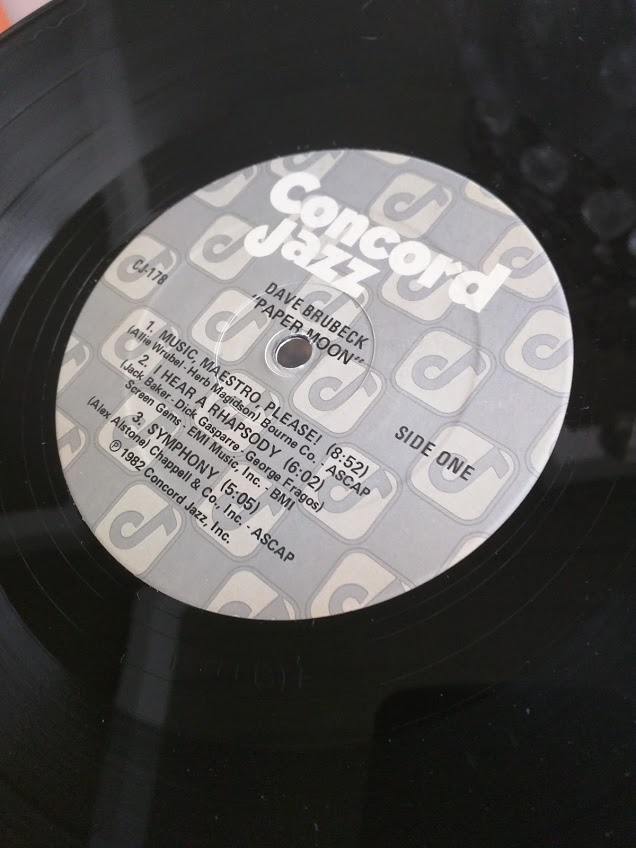
Concord Jazz label

Concord Jazz is a record company and label founded in 1973 by Carl Jefferson, the former owner of Jefferson Motors Lincoln Mercury dealership in Concord, California. The label was named after the city in the East San Francisco Bay area, and the jazz festival which Jefferson also began. The label issued recordings by Art Blakey, Cannonball Adderley, Stan Getz, Ray Brown, Rosemary Clooney, Chick Corea, Eliane Elias, and Kurt Elling.As of 2026, It is owned by BMG Rights Management.

== Artists ==
- Cannonball Adderley
- Howard Alden
- Herb Alpert
- Monty Alexander
- Steve Allen
- Eden Atwood
- George Barnes
- Ray Barretto
- Count Basie
- Art Blakey
- Terence Blanchard
- Willie Bobo
- Ruby Braff
- Randy Brecker
- Butcher Brown
- Ray Brown
- Dave Brubeck
- Charlie Byrd
- Frank Capp
- Betty Carter
- Ray Charles
- Rosemary Clooney
- John Collins
- Bing Crosby
- Jorge Dalto
- Buddy DeFranco
- Kurt Elling
- Herb Ellis
- Tal Farlow
- Chris Flory
- Stan Getz
- Nubya Garcia
- Vince Guaraldi
- Scott Hamilton
- Gene Harris
- Donald Harrison
- Barney Kessel
- Henry Mancini
- Tania Maria
- Rob McConnell
- Dave McKenna
- Marian McPartland
- Carmen McRae
- Peter Nero
- Joe Pass
- Nat Pierce
- Tito Puente
- Benny Reid
- Emily Remler
- Poncho Sanchez
- George Shearing
- Carol Sloane
- Cal Tjader
- Mel Tormé
- Joe Venuti
