= Carl Jefferson =

American jazz record producer (1919–1995)

Carl Jefferson (December 10, 1919 – March 29, 1995) was an American jazz record producer, and was the founder of the Concord Records label.

== Biography ==
Jefferson was born in Alameda, California. Prior to entering the music business, he owned and operated Jefferson Motors, a Lincoln & Mercury dealership located on Willow Pass Road in Concord, California. In 1969, he organized a jazz festival, the Concord Summer Festival, at the Concord Avenue Park; several years later it was renamed the Concord Jazz Festival and took its new home at the Concord Pavilion which Jefferson was a huge proponent of being built and located in Concord, CA. He founded Concord Records in 1972 to offer many of his favorite musicians an outlet for recording; the label initially specialized in guitarists (Herb Ellis, Charlie Byrd, Barney Kessel, Emily Remler) but soon branched out into swing (George Barnes & Ruby Braff, Scott Hamilton, Warren Vache, Dan Barrett, Howard Alden, Ken Peplowski), Great American Songbook (Carmen McRae, Rosemary Clooney, Mel Tormé, Marty Paich), and latin jazz (Cal Tjader, Tito Puente, Mongo Santamaría, Poncho Sanchez). Jefferson acted as producer for well over 500 recording sessions.
