= You Don't Know What Love Is =

Song
- Written: 1941
- Composer: Gene de Paul
- Lyricist: Don Raye

"You Don't Know What Love Is" is a popular song of the Great American Songbook, written by Don Raye (lyrics) and Gene de Paul (music) for the Abbott and Costello film Keep 'Em Flying (1941), in which it was sung by Carol Bruce. The song was deleted from the film prior to release. The song was later included in Behind the Eight Ball (1942), starring the Ritz Brothers. "You Don't Know What Love Is" was again sung by Carol Bruce; it was her third and final film until the 1980s.

After Miles Davis recorded an instrumental version of the song in 1954, it became a jazz standard, with Dinah Washington releasing a soulful pop-flavored vocal version a year later, along with a searing Modern Jazz take by Anita O'Day, accompanied by Jimmy Rowles and Tal Farlow. Other noteworthy recordings were made by Billie Holiday (with string arrangements by Ray Ellis), Sonny Rollins, and Chet Baker.

== Other versions ==
- Jan Savitt (1941)
- Louis Armstrong - (1942)
- Chet Baker - Chet Baker Sings and Plays (1955)
- Art Blakey - Art Blakey!!!!! Jazz Messengers!!!!! (1961)
- John Coltrane - Ballads (1962)
- Larry Coryell - Lady Coryell (1968)
- Elvis Costello - Piano Jazz: McPartland/Costello (2005)
- Miles Davis - Walkin' (1954)
- Eric Dolphy - Last Date (1964)
- Booker Ervin - Heavy!!! (1968)
- Ella Fitzgerald - (1941)
- Marvin Gaye - The Soulful Moods of Marvin Gaye (1961)
- Benny Goodman
- Earl Hines with Billy Eckstine - (1941)
- Billie Holiday
- Freddie Hubbard - Outpost (1981)
- Chrissie Hynde, of the Pretenders (2019)
- Ahmad Jamal - Poinciana (1963)
- Harry James
- Lee Konitz - Motion (reissue) (1961)
- Gloria Lynne - I Wish You Love (1964)
- Warne Marsh - Warne Marsh Trios (1975)
- Anita O'Day - An Evening With Anita O'Day (1955)
- Sonny Rollins - Saxophone Colossus (1956)
- Charlie Rouse - Yeah! (1961)
- Nina Simone - Tribute to Billie Holiday (2008)
- June Tabor - Some Other Time (1989)
- Lennie Tristano - The New Tristano (1961)
- Dinah Washington - For Those in Love (1955)
- Tony Bennett and Bill Evans - The Complete Tony Bennett/Bill Evans Recordings (2009)
- George Benson - Tenderly (1989)
- Cassandra Wilson - Blue Light ‘til Dawn (1993)
- Diamanda Galás - All the Way (2017)
