= Offering (Larry Coryell album) =

Studio album by Larry Coryell
- Released: 1972
- Recorded: January 17, 18, 20, 1972
- Studio: Vanguard 23rd Street Studios, New York City
- Genre: Jazz, jazz fusion
- Length: 38:50
- Label: Vanguard
- Producer: Daniel Weiss

Larry Coryell chronology
Barefoot Boy (1971)	Offering (1972)	The Real Great Escape (1973)

Professional ratings
Review scores
Source	Rating
AllMusic	4/5 stars
Christgau's Record Guide	C+
The Rolling Stone Jazz Record Guide	3/5 stars

Offering is a jazz album by guitarist Larry Coryell, released by Vanguard Records in 1972. Coryell's sidemen were Steve Marcus on soprano sax, Mervin Bronson on bass, Mike Mandel on electric piano, and Harry Wilkinson on drums. The album was produced by Daniel Weiss and engineered by Jeff Zaraya.

== Track listing ==
All tracks written by Larry Coryell, except where noted

Side one

1. "Foreplay" – 8:11
2. "Ruminations" (Doug Davis) – 4:17
3. "Scotland I" – 6:26

Side two

1. "Offering" (Harry C. Wilkinson) – 6:37
2. "The Mediation of November 8th" – 5:12
3. "Beggar's Chant"(Davis) – 8:07

== Personnel ==
Musicians

- Larry Coryell – guitar
- Steve Marcus – soprano sax
- Mike Mandel – electric piano (with fuzz-wah)
- Mervin Bronson – bass
- Harry Wilkinson – drums

Production

- Jeff Zaraya – engineering
- Daniel Weiss – producer
- Jules Halfant – art direction
- France Ing – cover photo
- John Jonas Gruen – back cover photo

== Chart performance ==
Chart (1972)	Peak position
U.S. Billboard Top Jazz Albums	20
