= Planet End =

Studio album by Larry Coryell
- Released: 1975
- Recorded: 1969/1974
- Studio: Vanguard's 23rd Street, New York City
- Genre: Jazz, jazz fusion
- Length: 34:06
- Label: Vanguard
- Producer: Daniel Weiss

Larry Coryell chronology
The Restful Mind (1975)	Planet End (1975)	Aspects (1976)

Professional ratings
Review scores
Source	Rating
AllMusic	3/5 stars
The Penguin Guide to Jazz Recordings	2.5/4 stars
The Rolling Stone Jazz Record Guide	3/5 stars

Planet End is an album by jazz guitarist Larry Coryell, released in 1975 by Vanguard Records. The album was produced by Daniel Weiss and engineered by David Baker. It was Coryell's final recording for Vanguard and reached number 39 on the 1976 Jazz Albums chart. The album consists of tracks recorded in 1974 by the then-current line-up of Coryell's band the Eleventh House (before Danny Trifan was replaced by John Lee on bass); plus two outtakes from the March 1969 sessions that produced the 1970 album, Spaces.

== Track listing ==
No.	Title	Writer(s)	Length
1.	"Cover Girl"	Alphonse Mouzon	5:37
2.	"Tyrone"	Larry Young	11:35
3.	"Rocks"	Randy Brecker, Michael Brecker	4:48
4.	"The Eyes of Love"	Larry Coryell	3:21
5.	"Planet End"	Coryell	8:45

== Personnel ==
=== 1974 tracks ===
The Eleventh House

- Larry Coryell – guitar (1,3)
- Mike Lawrence – trumpet (1,3)
- Mike Mandel – electric piano & synthesizer (1,3)
- Danny Trifan – bass (1,3)
- Alphonse Mouzon – drums, percussion (1,3)

Larry Coryell solo

- Larry Coryell – all instruments (4)

=== 1969 tracks ===
- Larry Coryell – guitar (2,5)
- John McLaughlin – guitar (2,5)
- Chick Corea – electric piano (2)
- Miroslav Vitous – bass (2,5)
- Billy Cobham – drums (2,5)

== Charts ==
Chart (1976)	Peak position
U.S. Billboard Jazz Albums	39
