= Inner Urge =

Inner Urge is a composition by jazz saxophonist Joe Henderson.

It may also refer to:

- Inner Urge (Joe Henderson album), a 1964 album featuring the above composition
- Inner Urge (Larry Coryell album), a 2001 album featuring the above composition
