= Yoron Israel =

American jazz drummer (born 1963)

Yoron Dael Israel (born November 24, 1963, in Chicago) is an American jazz drummer.

Israel learned to play organ and trumpet as a child, then switched to drums. As a high school student, he played in an R&B group led by his uncle. He took his bachelor's degree at Roosevelt University and his master's degree at Rutgers, then became the drummer in a house band for a Chicago jazz club and worked with Hank Crawford, David Friedman, Von Freeman, and Ira Sullivan. He relocated to New York City in 1989 and played that year with Henry Threadgill, Kenny Burrell, and Jay Hoggard. In the 1990s he worked with Charles Fambrough, Art Farmer, Jim Hall, Roy Hargrove, Tom Harrell, Ahmad Jamal, Abbey Lincoln, Joe Lovano, Russell Malone, Sonny Rollins, Vanessa Rubin, Horace Silver, Ronald Muldrow and James Williams. He also toured with Tony Bennett and with Steve Coleman in 1995. He taught at Rutgers from 1995 and is now an assistant professor at Berklee College of Music.

== Discography ==
With Kenny Burrell

- Guiding Spirit (Contemporary, 1989)

With Larry Coryell

- Monk, Trane, Miles & Me (HighNote, 1999)
- New High (HighNote, 2000)
- Inner Urge (HighNote, 2001)

With David "Fathead" Newman

- Cityscape (HighNote, 2006)
- Life (HighNote, 2007)
- Diamondhead (HighNote, 2008)
- The Blessing (HighNote, 2009)

With Ahmad Jamal

- Chicago Revisited: Live at Joe Segal's Jazz Showcase (Telarc, 1993)

With John Stein

- Interplay (Azica Records, 2004)
