= Early Spring =

Early Spring can refer to:

- Early Spring (1956 film), a Japanese film
- Early Spring (1959 film), a South Korean film featuring Kang Hyo-shil
- Early Spring (1986 film), a Danish film
- Early Spring (painting), a hanging scroll painting by Guo Xi, completed in 1072
- Early Spring (album), a 1988 album by Alphonse Mouzon

== See also ==
- Spring (disambiguation)
