= Spaces (Larry Coryell album) =

Studio album by Larry Coryell
- Released: 1970
- Recorded: March 1970
- Studio: Vanguard's 23rd Street Studios, New York City (NY)
- Genre: Jazz, jazz fusion
- Length: 37:02
- Label: Vanguard
- Producer: Daniel Weiss

Larry Coryell chronology
| Coryell (1969) | Spaces (1970) | Larry Coryell at the Village Gate (1971) |

Professional ratings
Review scores
| Source | Rating |
|---|---|
| AllMusic | 4/5 stars |
| Christgau's Record Guide | B |
| The Penguin Guide to Jazz Recordings | 3.5/4 stars |
| The Rolling Stone Jazz Record Guide | 4/5 stars |

Spaces is an album by jazz guitarist Larry Coryell that was released in 1970 by Vanguard Records. Coryell is accompanied by John McLaughlin on guitar, Chick Corea on electric piano, Miroslav Vitouš on bass, and Billy Cobham on drums. The album was produced by Daniel Weiss and engineered by David Baker and Paul Berkowitz.

The album is sometimes considered to have started the jazz fusion genre. All of the participating musicians went on to form prominent fusion bands in the 1970s: McLaughlin and Cobham co-founded Mahavishnu Orchestra, Corea founded Return to Forever, Vitouš formed Weather Report (with Wayne Shorter and Joe Zawinul), and Coryell went on to start the Eleventh House in 1972.

== The Sessions ==
“The first day was strange”, said Coryell of the sessions, “because Chick and Billy and John had just come from sessions with Miles. They had definitely been taking some different approaches to the music at those sessions, because when I threw down the first piece, “Tyrone” by Larry Young, the cats did not play it straight. They were all going into outer space…almost nothing we played that first day made the cut: it seems as if we got most of the music that went on the record on the second day. It just took a while to get comfortable with each other and the material…Spaces did not do that great upon initial release, but when Vanguard reissued it a few years later, it sold 250,000 copies. Not bad for a record that sounded very little like traditional jazz and nothing like rock.”

Two discarded tracks from the two-day Spaces sessions, "Tyrone" and "Planet End", were released on Planet End in 1975, along with contemporary material by Coryell's then-current band, The Eleventh House (from the book Bathed In Lightning by Colin Harper, Jawbone Press, 2014).

== Track listing ==
| No. | Title | Length |
|---|---|---|
| 1. | "Spaces (Infinite)" (Julie Coryell) | 9:23 |
| 2. | "Rene's Theme" (Réne Thomas) | 4:12 |
| 3. | "Gloria's Step" (Scott LaFaro) | 4:32 |
| 4. | "Wrong Is Right" (Larry Coryell) | 9:02 |
| 5. | "Chris" (Julie Coryell) | 9:32 |
| 6. | "New Year's Day in Los Angeles 1968" (Larry Coryell) | 0:21 |

== Personnel ==
- Larry Coryell – guitar
- John McLaughlin – guitar (1,2,4,5)
- Chick Corea – electric piano (5)
- Miroslav Vitouš – double bass (1,3,4,5)
- Billy Cobham – drums (1,3,4,5)

Production

- Dave Baker – engineer, mixing
- Paul Berkowitz – assistant
- Daniel Weiss – producer
