= Dunlop Cry Baby =

American guitar pedal

Cry Baby
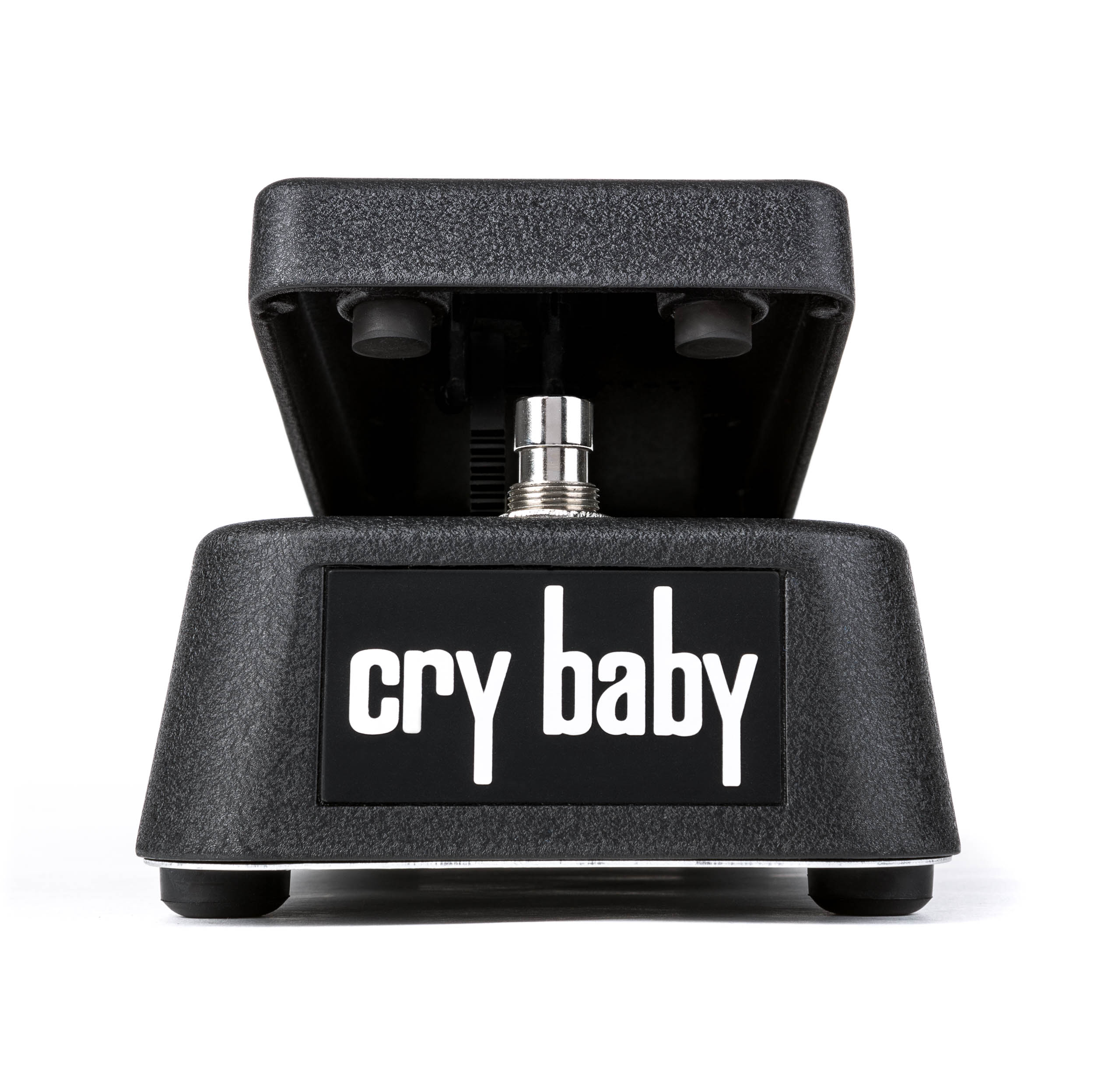
- The Original GCB95 Cry Baby Wah
- Manufacturer: Dunlop Manufacturing, Inc.
- Dates: 1966 – present

Technical specifications
- Effects type: Wah-wah
- Hardware: Analog

Controls

Input/output

The Dunlop Cry Baby is a wah-wah pedal, manufactured by Dunlop Manufacturing, Inc. The name Cry Baby was from the original pedal from which it was copied, the Thomas Organ/Vox Cry Baby wah-wah, first manufactured in 1966. Thomas Organ/Vox failed to register the name as a trademark, leaving it open for Dunlop. More recently, Dunlop manufactured the Vox pedals under licence, although this is no longer the case.

The said wah-wah effect was originally intended to imitate the supposed crying tone that a muted trumpet produced, but became an expressive tool in its own way. It is used when a guitarist is soloing, or to create a "wacka-wacka" funk styled rhythm. The original pedals were popularized by guitarists such as Jimi Hendrix, Eric Clapton, and David Gilmour, although many artists have developed signature sounds with them since.

== Models ==
- GCB95 – Also known as the "Cry Baby Original". Typically the lowest priced model. Bypass switch has improved over the years therefore loss of tone is not as bad. From 1966 until sometime in 2003 this pedal was produced with a black inductor, which is still available as a spare part from Dunlop. Dunlop began using the red Fasel inductor in this pedal in 2003, so some Revision "H" models have the black inductor, while others have the red Fasel inductor. Revision "I" and upward all have the red Fasel inductor.
- GCB95G – Gold-plated Cry Baby Wah celebrating 50 years since the original pedal hit the market in 1967.
- GCB95F Classic – A Cry Baby with a Fasel (classic Italian-made) inductor and a Hot Potz 100K Ohm potentiometer.
- CBM95 Cry Baby Mini Wah – Three different wah voicings—Low, Vintage, GCB95—into a housing that's half the standard size.
- 95Q – A Switchless Cry Baby with a Q control (which varies the intensity of the wah effect), a volume boost, and the auto-return function.
- 535Q – Features tone shifting abilities using the Q control, six different wah ranges, and a volume boost.
- CBM105Q Cry Baby Mini Bass Wah – Delivers the same sound and functionality as the popular 105Q at half the size with a lighter aluminum housing.
- 105Q Cry Baby Bass Wah – A Cry Baby designed for bass guitars that only affects the mid and high frequencies. Features Q and Volume controls and comes in a white housing. Although designed for use with bass guitar, HIM guitarist Linde Lindström actually uses the 105Q with regular guitar because he finds it "more aggressive" than a normal guitar wah.
- Limited Edition (1999) – Purple, White, Red or Hammertone Gray.
- EW95V Mister Cry Baby Super Volume – Doubles as a wah pedal and a volume boosting pedal. It can provide a volume boost of up to 16 decibels.
- JH1D Jimi Hendrix Cry Baby Wah – Reproduces Hendrix's wah tone as heard on classics such as "Voodoo Child (Slight Return)."
- JHM9 Jimi Hendrix Cry Baby Mini Wah – This pedal is crafted to deliver the same dynamic tonal sweep of the original Italian-made Thomas Organ wah Jimi Hendrix used with half the footprint of a standard wah pedal.
- JH1FW Jimi Hendrix Fuzz-wah – A combination of the Jimi Hendrix Signature Wah and the Jimi Hendrix Fuzz. It can be used as a Wah Pedal, a Fuzz Pedal, or both at the same time.
- BG95 Buddy Guy Signature Cry Baby Wah – Features the legendary Fasel Inductor and two distinct selectable voices—Deep for a big and throaty sound and BG for Buddy's bell-like tone.
- DB01 Dimebag Darrell Signature Cry Baby Wah – Features an extended sweep for more lows and highs, a fine-tune knob, a side-mounted 6-way frequency selector, and a switchable boost with LEDs to indicate wah and boost status.
- ZW45 Zakk Wylde Signature Cry Baby Wah – Delivers Zakk Wylde's characteristically thick and cutting tone with a heavy-duty raw-metal casting. Introduced by Dunlop in 2005.
- SW95 Slash Signature Cry Baby Wah – Combines high gain distortion with the Classic circuit for Slash's cutting lead tone, with LEDs to indicate effect status. Introduced by Dunlop in 2007.
- SC95 Slash Signature Cry Baby Wah – Features a custom-wound resonance inductor, a huge dynamic range, and a wide sweep with LEDs to indicate effect status. Introduced by Dunlop in 2012.
- EVH95 Eddie Van Halen Signature Cry Baby Wah – Based on EVH's own "Holy Grail" wah pedal, this Cry Baby Wah features a custom inductor, pot, and an extra wide frequency sweep.
- KH95 Kirk Hammett Signature Cry Baby Wah – Captures Kirk Hammett's thick top end and full dynamic range with custom graphics and tread.
- JC95 Jerry Cantrell Signature Cry Baby Wah – Features a dark, punchy voice and a wide sweep with a control on the side for fine-tuning the toe-down frequency. Introduced by Dunlop in 2010. The lyrics to the Alice in Chains' song "Black Gives Way to Blue" are printed on the base plate of the pedal.
- JB95 Joe Bonamassa Signature Cry Baby Wah – Voiced by a vintage-style Halo Inductor for added harmonic content and growl.
- TM95M Tak Matsumoto Signature Cry Baby Wah – Tak Matsumoto's signature Cry Baby.
- JP95 John Petrucci Signature Cry Baby Wah – Based on John Petrucci's rack wah settings, this Cry Baby Wah features Volume, Q, and six EQ controls for tonal control over your wah sound.
- BD95 Billy Duffy Signature Cry Baby Bass Wah – The Billy Duffy Cry Baby Wah combines two different wahs in a single housing.
- GZR95 Geezer Butler Signature Cry Baby Bass Wah – The first signature Bass Cry Baby, named for longtime Black Sabbath bassist Geezer Butler. Based on the 95Q but tweaked for bass, with a midrange bite as opposed to the envelope filter-like funk sweep of the 105Q. Has switchless auto-return operation, and a Q knob inside the pedal preset to Butler's favorite setting. Introduced summer 2017.

With the exception of the GCB95F and most of the artist signature models, many of the newer Cry Baby models use a single-pole switch instead of true-bypass; using single-pole switching instead of true-bypass adds significant impedance, which can affect the tone.

In addition to the floor pedal models, Dunlop also offers Cry Baby module DCR2SR, where the circuitry and tone controls are housed in a single rack unit; a floor rocker pedal only acts as a controller for the module. Up to six controller pedals can be connected to a single module, if multiple pedals need to be spread out on a larger stage.

== See also ==
- Thomas Organ Company
- Vox (musical equipment)
