= Funky Snakefoot =

Album by Alphonse Mouzon

Studio album by Alphonse Mouzon
- Released: 1974
- Recorded: December 10–12, 1973
- Genre: Jazz-funk
- Length: 44:06
- Label: Blue Note

Alphonse Mouzon chronology
The Essence of Mystery (1972)	Funky Snakefoot (1974)	Mind Transplant (1975)

Funky Snakefoot is the second album by American jazz drummer Alphonse Mouzon recorded in 1973 and released on the Blue Note label.

== Reception ==
The AllMusic review by Jason Ankeny awarded the album 4½ stars stating "Alphonse Mouzon is celebrated largely for his drumming skills, the brilliant Funky Snakefoot is first and foremost a showcase for his keyboard prowess. Galvanized by its thick, greasy Arp, Moog, and organ solos, the album recalls Blue Note contemporaries like Gene Harris, albeit augmented by Mouzon's monster rhythms. Add his ragged-but-right vocals to the mix and Funky Snakefoot veers closer to mainstream R&B than virtually anything else the label ever released, but there's no denying the ferocity or virtuosity of this music".

Professional ratings
Review scores
Source	Rating
AllMusic	4.5/5 stars
The Rolling Stone Jazz Record Guide	1/5 stars

== Track listing ==
All compositions by Alphonse Mouzon, except where noted

1. "I've Given You My Love" (Mark Langford) – 4:43
2. "You Don't Know How Much I Love You" (Elvena Mouzon) – 4:40
3. "I Gotta Have You" – 2:46
4. "My Life Is So Blue" (Mark Langford) – 4:37
5. "Funky Snakefoot" – 3:45
6. "My Little Rosebud" (Elvena Mouzon) – 2:02
7. "A Permanent Love" (Elvena Mouzon) – 4:20
8. "The Beggar" (Mary Highsmith) – 4:35
9. "Oh Yes I Do" (Mark Langford) – 4:35
10. "Tara, Tara" (Mary Highsmith) – 3:35
11. "Where I'm Drumming From" – 1:20
12. "Ism" (Larry Coryell) – 3:08

- Recorded at Electric Lady Studios in New York City on December 10, 11 & 12, 1973

== Personnel ==
- Alphonse Mouzon – drums, vocals, synthesizer, tack piano
- Randy Brecker – trumpet (tracks 1, 5, 7, 9 & 12)
- Barry Rogers – trombone (tracks 1, 5, 7, 9 & 12)
- Andy Gadsden – tenor saxophone (tracks 1, 5, 7, 9 & 12)
- Harry Whitaker – piano, clavinet
- Leon Pendarvis – electric piano, organ
- Richie Resnicoff – guitar
- Mark Harowitz – pedal steel guitar, banjo
- Gary King – electric bass
- Ray Armando – conga, bongo
- Angel Allende, Steve Berrios – percussion
