= The Man Incognito =

Studio album by Alphonse Mouzon
- Released: 1976
- Recorded: December 2, 1975
- Genre: Jazz-funk
- Length: 39:20
- Label: Blue Note
- Producer: Skip Drinkwater

Alphonse Mouzon chronology
Mind Transplant (1975)	The Man Incognito (1976)	Virtue (1977)

Produced By Skip Drinkwater Co-Produced By Alphonse Mouzon

The Man Incognito is the fourth album by American jazz drummer Alphonse Mouzon recorded in 1975 and released on the Blue Note label.

== Reception ==
The AllMusic review by Robert Taylor awarded the album 2 stars stating "Most of the arrangements here are repetitive and were obviously meant to be used as dance music. Fusion fans are encouraged to steer clear of this one, as it amounts to nothing more than a '70s disco session -- and a boring one at that".

Professional ratings
Review scores
Source	Rating
AllMusic	2/5 stars
The Rolling Stone Jazz Record Guide	2/5 stars

== Track listing ==
All compositions by Alphonse Mouzon

1. "Take Your Troubles Away" - 5:03
2. "Snake Walk" - 3:49
3. "Before You Leave" - 4:26
4. "Just Like The Sun" - 6:30
5. "You Are My Dream" - 3:30
6. "New York City" - 4:06
7. "Without A Reason" - 4:09
8. "Mouzon Moves On" - 3:41
9. "Behind Your Mind" - 4:06

- Recorded at Sound Labs in Los Angeles, California on December 2, 1975

== Personnel ==
- Alphonse Mouzon - drums, percussion, vocals, synthesizer
- Gary Grant - trumpet
- George Bohanon - trombone
- Ray Pizzi - tenor saxophone, alto saxophone
- Tom Scott - tenor saxophone, baritone saxophone, Lyricon
- David Benoit - piano, electric piano
- Dave Grusin - piano, electric piano, clavinet
- Dawilli Gonga, Ian Underwood - moog synthesizer
- David T. Walker - guitar (track 6)
- Lee Ritenour - guitar, electric guitar
- Tim DeHuff - electric guitar
- Charles Meeks - electric bass
- Emil Richards - cymbals, percussion
- Victor Feldman - conga, bongo, percussion
- Marty McCall, Jackie Ward, Caroline Willis - vocals
