= Two for the Road (Larry Coryell & Steve Khan album) =

Live album by Larry Coryell & Steve Khan
- Released: 1977
- Genre: Jazz fusion, pop, rock
- Length: 56:32
- Label: Arista
- Producer: Steve Khan

Larry Coryell chronology
| Twin House (1977) | Two for the Road (1977) | Live in Europe (1977) |

Professional ratings
Review scores
| Source | Rating |
|---|---|
| Allmusic | 4/5 stars |

Two for the Road is a live album by American jazz fusion guitarists Larry Coryell and Steve Khan that which was released by Arista Records in 1977.

== Reception ==
AllMusic awarded the album 4 stars and its review by Eugene Chadbourne states: "Intermittently on the road as an acoustic duo between gaps in the schedules of their respective ultra-hip fusion bands, Larry Coryell and Steve Khan managed to record several shows and then panned the tape stream to find the nuggets for posterity. There are choices that might have been made out of the fashions of the day, such as the version of Chick Corea's "Spain" that opens the album's first side. Thankfully there are also selections that are here because both guitarists must have realized they were playing magnificently".

== Track listing ==
All tracks are written by Larry Coryell except where noted.

| No. | Title | Length |
|---|---|---|
| 1. | "Spain" (Chick Corea/Joaquín Rodrigo) | 5:30 |
| 2. | "Bouquet" (Bobby Hutcherson) | 5:20 |
| 3. | "Son of Stiff Neck" (Coryell/Steve Khan) | 5:35 |
| 4. | "JuJu" (Wayne Shorter) | 3:08 |
| 5. | "St. Gallen" | 7:10 |
| 6. | "Footprints" (Shorter) | 5:30 |
| 7. | "General Moto's Well Laid Plan" (Steve Swallow) | 5:07 |
| 8. | "Toronto under the Sign of Capricorn" (Bonus track) | 8:38 |
| 9. | "For Philip and Django" (Bonus track) | 4:32 |
| 10. | "Rodrigo Reflections" (Bonus track) | 7:22 |

== Personnel ==
- Larry Coryell – guitar
- Steve Khan – guitar
