= New High =

Studio album by Larry Coryell
- Released: April 11, 2000
- Recorded: September 10, 1999
- Studio: Van Gelder Studio, Englewood Cliffs, NJ
- Genre: Jazz
- Length: 50:02
- Label: HighNote; HCD 7052
- Producer: Don Sickler

Larry Coryell chronology
Monk, Trane, Miles & Me (1999)	New High (2000)	Inner Urge (2001)

New High is an album by guitarist Larry Coryell which was recorded in 1999 and released on the HighNote label the following year.

== Reception ==
Professional ratings
Review scores
Source	Rating
Allmusic	4/5 stars

In his review on Allmusic, Stewart Mason states "A better-than-average standards date, Larry Coryell's New High finds the guitarist in a supportive small-combo setting, playing a solid mix of some well-chosen standards and a fine pair of originals. ... Larry Coryell has taken some heat from jazz purists for his too-regular forays into easy listening jazz-pop, but New High is a more-than-respectable piece of solid post-bop". In JazzTimes, Jim Ferguson called it " an album that is beautifully played and recorded" noting "the opening moments of this most recent album leave little doubt that he's in a blowing, straightahead frame of mind and in command of an expert combo".

== Track listing ==
All compositions by Larry Coryell except where noted

1. "Bags' Groove" (Milt Jackson) – 8:02
2. "Like Sonny" (John Coltrane) – 5:46
3. "Funereal" – 5:04
4. "Ursula" (Harold Land) – 5:48
5. "John Charles" (Ronnie Mathews) – 7:53
6. "Spiral Staircase" (Mark Sherman) – 6:49
7. "Old Folks" (Willard Robison, Dedette Lee Hill) – 5:25
8. "New High" – 5:15

== Personnel ==
- Larry Coryell – guitar
- Shunzo Ono – trumpet (tracks 1, 3, 7 & 8)
- Ronnie Mathews – piano (tracks 1–6 & 8)
- Mark Sherman – vibraphone (tracks 1, 3, 6 & 8)
- Buster Williams – bass (tracks 1–6 & 8)
- Yoron Israel – drums (tracks 1–6 & 8)
