= The Essence of Mystery =

Studio album by Alphonse Mouzon
- Released: 1973
- Recorded: December 13–15, 1972
- Genre: Jazz-funk
- Length: 42:15
- Label: Blue Note

Alphonse Mouzon chronology
The Essence of Mystery (1973)	Funky Snakefoot (1974)

The Essence of Mystery is the debut album by American jazz drummer Alphonse Mouzon recorded in 1972 and released in 1973 on the Blue Note label.

== Reception ==
The AllMusic review by Ron Wynn awarded the album 3 stars stating "Some frenetic drumming and good jazz/rock arrangements".

Professional ratings
Review scores
Source	Rating
AllMusic	3/5 stars
The Rolling Stone Jazz Record Guide	3/5 stars

== Track listing ==
All compositions by Alphonse Mouzon

1. "The Essence of Mystery" - 4:55
2. "Funky Finger" - 3:40
3. "Crying Angels" - 5:23
4. "Why Can't We Make It" - 3:27
5. "Macrobian" - 5:14
6. "Spring Water" - 6:27
7. "Sunflower" - 4:27
8. "Thank You Lord" - 4:02
9. "Antonia" - 4:40

- Recorded at A&R Studios in New York City on December 13, 14 & 15, 1972

== Personnel ==
- Alphonse Mouzon - drums, timpani, tabla, percussion, electric piano, clavinet, Mellotron, vocals
- Buddy Terry - soprano saxophone
- Sonny Fortune - alto saxophone
- Larry Willis - piano, electric piano
- Buster Williams - bass
- Wilbur Bascomb Jr. - electric bass
