= Bob Thompson (musician, born 1942) =

American pianist

- Born: Robert H. Thompson; December 12, 1942 (age 83); Jamaica, Queens, New York, U.S.
- Genres: Jazz, gospel
- Occupations: Musician, composer, arranger
- Instrument: Piano
- Years active: 1970s–present

Robert H. "Bob" Thompson (born December 12, 1942) is an American jazz pianist, composer, and arranger based in West Virginia, whose music career has spanned for over 50 years. He is the featured house pianist for West Virginia's Public Broadcasting nationally syndicated show, Mountain Stage, and is the founding member of The Bob Thompson Unit.

== Early life ==
Thompson was born in Jamaica, Queens, New York, where as a teenager, he began his music career as the bass singer of a do-wop group called The Chanters. He later on moved to Charleston, West Virginia in the mid-1960s to attend West Virginia State College, where he first played the trumpet, but later on switched to the piano in order to join a jazz band. After switching to the piano, Thompson played with several jazz bands such as The Modern Jazz Interpreters, and Joi.

== Music career ==
In 1981, Thompson released his debut album Morning Star, under the Rainbow Records label, followed by his second album 7 In, 7 Out, released in 1984; he then signed with Intima Records, where he released his next three albums, Brother's Keeper (1986), Say What You Want (1988), and Wilderness (1989). Thompson then signed with Ichiban Records, where he released five more albums, Love Dance (1992), followed by The Magic in Your Heart (1993), Ev'ry Time I Feel the Spirit (1996), Lady First (1997), and Spirit (2003).

Throughout his career, Thompson has played with several musicians such as guitarist Larry Coryell, violinist John Blake Jr., guitarist Kevin Eubanks, and drummer Omar Hakim, and has also toured internationally, performing in Europe, Africa and South America. His music was also featured in the "Local Forecast" segments on The Weather Channel during the 1980s and 1990s.

Since 1991, Thompson has been the featured house pianist for West Virginia's Public Broadcasting nationally syndicated show, Mountain Stage. He is also the co-producer and host of the holiday jazz show, Joy to the World, which is broadcast on radio stations nationwide, and internationally on the Voice of America. In addition, he is the founder and member of the jazz fusion band, The Bob Thompson Unit.

In 2015, Thompson was inducted into the West Virginia Music Hall of Fame.

== Discography ==
- 1981: Morning Star (Rainbow Records)
- 1984: 7 In, 7 Out (Rainbow Records)
- 1986: Brother's Keeper (Intima Records)
- 1988: Say What You Want (Intima Records)
- 1989: Wilderness (Intima Records)
- 1992: Love Dance (Ichiban Records)
- 1993: The Magic in Your Heart (Ichiban Records)
- 1996: Ev'ry Time I Feel the Spirit (Ichiban International)
- 1997: Lady First (Ichiban International)
- 2003: Spirit (Ichiban Records)

Discography citation:
