= Twin House =

Studio album by Larry Coryell & Philip Catherine
- Released: 1977
- Studio: Olympic
- Genre: Jazz fusion
- Length: 40:30
- Label: Elektra
- Producer: Siegfried Loch

Larry Coryell chronology
The Lion and the Ram (1976)	Twin House (1977)	Two for the Road (1977)

Philip Catherine chronology
Guitars (1975)	Twin House (1977)	Splendid (1978)

Twin House is an album by American guitarist Larry Coryell and Belgian guitarist Philip Catherine, released by Elektra Records in 1977. The duo recorded a second album, Splendid, in 1978.

== Reception ==
Professional ratings
Review scores
Source	Rating
AllMusic	4/5 stars
The Penguin Guide to Jazz Recordings	3/4 stars
The Rolling Stone Jazz Record Guide	4/5 stars

AllMusic awarded the album four stars and its review by Robert Taylor states: "The first of two fine guitar duet recordings with Phillip Catherine. Of the two, Catherine's sound is more rooted in the tradition of Django Reinhardt and tends to be more introspective. Coryell is his usual incorrigible self; however, Catherine's presence seemed to inspire more experimentation and intelligent playing on Coryell's part".

== Track listing ==
1. "Ms. Julie" (Larry Coryell) – 5:27
2. "Homecomings" (Philip Catherine) – 5:57
3. "Airpower" (Catherine) – 4:02
4. "Twin House" (Catherine) – 4:54
5. "Mortgage on Your Soul" (Keith Jarrett) – 3:01
6. "Gloryell" (Jimmy Webb) – 7:16
7. "Nuages" (Django Reinhardt) – 5:18
8. "Twice a Week" (Catherine) – 4:42

== Personnel ==
- Larry Coryell – guitar
- Philip Catherine – guitar
