= Barefoot Boy =

Studio album by Larry Coryell
- Released: 1971
- Studio: Electric Lady, New York
- Genre: Jazz fusion
- Length: 40:35
- Label: Flying Dutchman
- Producer: Bob Thiele

Larry Coryell chronology
Fairyland (1971)	Barefoot Boy (1971)	Offering (1972)

Barefoot Boy is Larry Coryell's only studio album for the Flying Dutchman label, a company created by Impulse! Records founder Bob Thiele. The album was produced by Thiele with assistance from Lillian Seyfert and engineered by Eddie Kramer. Barefoot Boy was recorded at Electric Ladyland, New York, United States.

== Reception ==
Professional ratings
Review scores
Source	Rating
AllMusic	4.5/5 stars
Christgau's Record Guide	B+
The Penguin Guide to Jazz Recordings	2/4 stars
The Rolling Stone Jazz Record Guide	3/5 stars

At AllMusic, Jim Newsom wrote, "This recording is a noteworthy example of the possibilities inherent in the early days of fusion, blending the electrifying energy of rock with the improvisational excitement of jazz."

== Track listing ==
No.	Title	Length
1.	"Gypsy Queen" (Gábor Szabó)	11:50
2.	"The Great Escape" (Coryell)	8:39
3.	"Call to the Higher Consciousness" (Coryell)	20:00

== Credits ==
- Larry Coryell – guitar
- Steve Marcus – soprano saxophone (1, 2), tenor saxophone (3)
- Mike Mandel – piano (3)
- Mervin Bronson – bass (2, 3)
- Roy Haynes – drums
- Lawrence Killian – conga
- Harry Wilkinson – percussion
- Bob Thiele – producer
- Lillian Seyfert – assistant producer
- Eddie Kramer – sound mixer
- Bob Palmer – liner notes
- Bob Gruen – cover & liner photographs
