= The Lion and the Ram =

Studio album by Larry Coryell
- Released: 1976
- Studio: Long View Farm, North Brookfield, Massachusetts
- Genre: Jazz fusion
- Length: 35:17
- Label: Arista
- Producer: Larry Coryell

Larry Coryell chronology
Aspects (1976)	The Lion and the Ram (1976)	Twin House (1977)

Professional ratings
Review scores
Source	Rating
Allmusic	2/5 stars

The Lion and the Ram is an album by the American guitarist Larry Coryell that was released as by Arista Records in 1976.

== Reception ==
At AllMusic, Wilson McCloy stated, "The Lion and the Ram is an underrated gem in the Coryell catalogue. It contains mostly acoustic guitar music and several outstanding original compositions. 'Bicentennial Head Fest', 'The Fifties', 'Domesticity', and 'Bach Lute Prelude' are fine examples of exciting, yet subtle and eclectic, improvisation-oriented guitar music."

== Track listing ==
All compositions by Larry Coryell except where noted

1. "Larry's Boogie" – 3:31
2. "Stravinsky" – 3:17
3. "Toy Soldiers" – 7:40
4. "Short Time Around" (Larry Coryell, Julie Coryell) – 4:01
5. "Improvisation on Bach Lute Prelude" – 2:00
6. "Songs for My Friend's Children" (Mike Mandel) – 2:45
7. "Bicentennial Head Fest" – 3:19
8. "Domesticity" – 3:26
9. "The Fifties" – 2:12
10. "The Lion and the Ram" (Joe Beck, Larry Coryell, Julie Coryell) – 4:26

== Personnel ==
- Larry Coryell – guitars, vocals
- Joe Beck – Fender Rhodes bass, string synthesizer, guitar
- Mike Mandel – piano, bass synthesizer
- Danny Toan – guitar on "Toy Soldiers"
- Michael Urbaniak – violin on "The Lion and the Ram"
