= Comin' Home (Larry Coryell album) =

Studio album by Larry Coryell
- Released: 1984
- Recorded: August 28, 1984
- Studio: Van Gelder Studio, Englewood Cliffs, NJ
- Genre: Jazz
- Length: 37:04
- Label: Muse
- Producer: Michael Cuscuna

Larry Coryell chronology
| Return (1979) | Comin' Home (1984) | Bolero (1981) |

Comin' Home is an album by guitarist Larry Coryell which was recorded in 1984 and released on the Muse label.

== Reception ==
Professional ratings
Review scores
| Source | Rating |
|---|---|
| AllMusic | 4.5/5 stars |

The AllMusic review by Scott Yanow stated "This is one of guitarist Larry Coryell's most straight-ahead sets, a bop-flavored session recorded in one day with a fine quartet that had just played a week at the Village Vanguard. ... Throughout, Larry Coryell shows that he could have been a top bop stylist if he had wanted to pursue that direction, instead of his more innovative and eclectic path".

== Track listing ==
All compositions by Larry Coryell except where noted

1. "Good Citizen Swallow" – 6:08
2. "Glorielle" – 7:52
3. "Twelve and Twelve" – 4:53
4. "No More Booze, Minor Blues" – 7:32
5. "Confirmation" (Charlie Parker) – 6:14
6. "It Never Entered My Mind" (Richard Rodgers, Lorenz Hart) – 4:25

== Personnel ==
- Larry Coryell – guitar
- Albert Dailey – piano
- George Mraz – bass
- Billy Hart – drums
- Julie Coryell – track 6 vocals
