= Alphonse Mouzon =

American musician and vocalist (1948–2016)

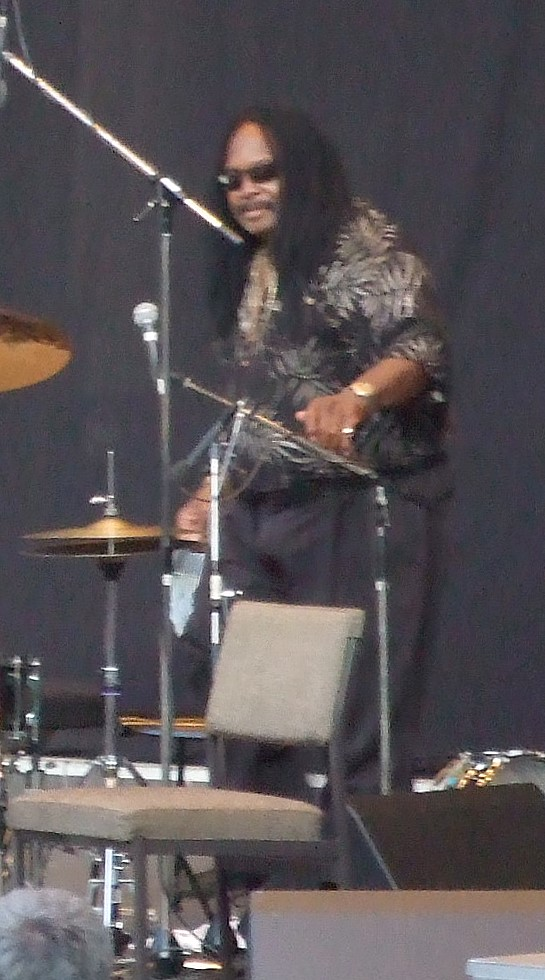
- Mouzon in 2009

Background information
- Born: Alphonse Lee Mouzon; November 21, 1948; Charleston, South Carolina, U.S.
- Died: December 25, 2016 (aged 68) Granada Hills, Los Angeles, California, U.S.
- Genres: Jazz, jazz fusion, jazz-funk, disco
- Occupations: Musician, record label owner
- Instruments: Drums, keyboards, vocals
- Years active: 1970–2016
- Labels: Blue Note, Tenacious

Alphonse Lee Mouzon (November 21, 1948 – December 25, 2016) was an American musician and vocalist, most prominently known as a jazz fusion drummer. He was also a composer, arranger, producer, and actor. Mouzon gained popularity in the late 1960s and early 1970s. He was the owner of Tenacious Records, a label that primarily released Mouzon's recordings.

== Biography ==
=== Early life ===
Mouzon, of African, French, and Blackfoot descent, was born on November 21, 1948, in Charleston, South Carolina. He received his first musical training at Bonds-Wilson High School, and moved to New York City upon graduation. He studied drama and music at the City College of New York, as well as medicine at Manhattan Medical School. He continued receiving drum lessons from Bobby Thomas, the drummer for jazz pianist Billy Taylor. He played percussion in the 1968 Broadway show Promises, Promises, and he then worked with pianist McCoy Tyner. He spent a year as a member of the jazz fusion band, Weather Report. After that Mouzon signed as a solo artist to the Blue Note label in 1972.

=== Career ===
Mouzon's visibility increased during his tenure with guitarist Larry Coryell's Eleventh House fusion band from 1973 to 1975. Albums from this period include Introducing the Eleventh House, Level One, Mind Transplant (a solo album), and in 1977, a reconciliation recording with Coryell entitled Back Together Again.

Mouzon recorded Mind Transplant in 1974 with guitarists Lee Ritenour and Tommy Bolin who had previously played on Billy Cobham's Spectrum.

He recorded four R&B albums: The Essence of Mystery (Blue Note, 1972), Funky Snakefoot (Blue Note, 1973), The Man Incognito (Blue Note, 1976) (including "Take Your Troubles Away"), and in the 1980s By All Means, which featured Herbie Hancock, Lee Ritenour, the Seawind Horns, and Freddie Hubbard.

Mouzon performed with many prominent jazz fusion musicians. In 1991, he performed with Miles Davis on the movie soundtrack album entitled Dingo. Mouzon composed the song The Blue Spot for the jazz club scene, and appeared as an actor and drummer in the Tom Hanks-directed film, That Thing You Do in 1996. Alphonse Mouzon played the role of Miles in the film The Highlife, which was exhibited at a film festival in Houston in 2003. He also can be seen with Michael Keaton and Katie Holmes in the film First Daughter, and as Ray in the movie The Dukes, along with Robert Davi, Chazz Palminteri and Peter Bogdanovich.

Mouzon played with Stevie Wonder, Eric Clapton, Jeff Beck, Carlos Santana, Patrick Moraz, Betty Davis, and Chubby Checker. Robert Plant, lead singer of Led Zeppelin, during his acceptance speech for induction into the 1995 Rock and Roll Hall of Fame, listed Alphonse Mouzon as one of the band's influences from American music.

In 1992, Mouzon formed Tenacious Records, and released his album The Survivor. Subsequent releases on Tenacious Records, including re-issues of earlier albums, included On Top of the World, Early Spring, By All Means, Love Fantasy, Back to Jazz, As You Wish, The Night is Still Young, The Sky is the Limit, Distant Lover, Morning Sun, and Absolute Greatest Love Songs and Ballads.

The 1981 album Morning Sun was his most successful album in Southeast Asia, particularly in the Philippines. Most songs in the album, notably the title track, were extensively played on various FM and AM radio stations during that time, and are still being used in advertisements, commercials, social events, and radio news programmes in that country.

Mouzon played on a recording with Albert Mangelsdorff (trombone), and Jaco Pastorius (bass), named Trilogue. Originally recorded in 1976, and re-released in 2005, this performance was from November 6, 1976, at the Berlin Jazz Days.

In 2014, Mouzon was invited by producer Gerry Gallagher to record with Latin rock legends El Chicano, as well as David Paich, Brian Auger, Alex Ligertwood, Ray Parker Jr., Lenny Castro, Vikki Carr, Pete Escovedo, Peter Michael Escovedo, Jessy J, Marcos J. Reyes, Siedah Garrett, Walfredo Reyes Jr., Salvador Santana, and Spencer Davis, and is featured on drums on two tracks Make Love and The Viper, that are part of Gallagher's most recent studio album due to be released in 2019.

=== Health problems and death ===
On September 7, 2016, Mouzon was diagnosed with neuroendocrine carcinoma, a rare form of cancer. His son, Jean-Pierre Mouzon, reported his father had died of cardiac arrest at his home in Granada Hills, Los Angeles, California, on December 25, 2016, at the age of 68.

== Awards and honors ==
- Listed in the second edition of Marquis Who's Who in Entertainment and Who's Who in the World
- Voted the No. 2 best multi-instrumentalist in the 1995 Jazziz Magazine Annual Readers' Poll

== Discography ==
=== As leader/co-leader ===
- The Essence of Mystery (Blue Note, 1973)
- Funky Snakefoot (Blue Note, 1974)
- Mind Transplant (Blue Note, 1975)
- The Man Incognito (Blue Note, 1976)
- Live at Berlin Jazz Days with Trilogue (MPS, 1977)
- Virtue (MPS, 1977)
- Back Together Again with Larry Coryell (Atlantic, 1977)
- In Search of a Dream (MPS, 1978)
- Baby Come Back (Metronome, 1979)
- Morning Sun (Pausa, 1981)
- By All Means (Pausa, 1981)
- Distant Lover (Highrise, 1982)
- The Sky Is the Limit (Pausa, 1985)
- The Eleventh House with Larry Coryell (Pausa, 1985)
- Back to Jazz (L+R, 1986)
- Love, Fantasy (Optimism, 1987)
- Early Spring (Optimism, 1988)
- As You Wish with Final Notice (Jazzline, 1989)
- Now with Infinity (Inak, 1991)
- Nevertheless with Just Friends (In+Out, 1992)
- The Survivor (Tenacious, 1992)
- On Top of the World (Tenacious, 1994)
- The Night Is Still Young (Tenacious, 1996)
- Fusion Jam with Tommy Bolin (1999)
- Live in Hollywood (Tenacious, 2001)
- Jazz in Bel-Air (Tenacious, 2008)
- Angel Face (Tenacious, 2011)

=== As a member ===
Weather Report

- Weather Report (Columbia, 1971)

Fania All-Stars

- Live (Fania, 1978)

=== As sideman ===
With Larry Coryell

- Introducing Eleventh House with Larry Coryell (Vanguard, 1974)
- Level One (Arista, 1975)
- Planet End (Vanguard, 1975)
- At Montreux (Vanguard, 1978)
- The Coryells (Chesky, 2000)
- January 1975 (Promising Music, 2014)
- Seven Secrets (Savoy, 2016)

With Herbie Hancock

- Directstep (CBS/Sony, 1979)
- Mr. Hands (Columbia, 1980)
- Monster (Columbia, 1980)
- Magic Windows (Columbia, 1981)

With Robin Kenyatta

- Stompin' at the Savoy (Atlantic, 1974)
- Beggars and Stealers (Muse, 1977)

With McCoy Tyner

- Sahara (Milestone, 1972)
- Song for My Lady (Milestone, 1973) – rec. 1972
- Song of the New World (Milestone, 1973)
- Enlightenment (Milestone, 1973) – live

With Jasper van 't Hof

- However (MPS, 1978)
- Live in Montreux (Pausa, 1980)
- Nevertheless (In+Out, 1992)

With others

- Arild Andersen, A Molde Concert (ECM, 1982)
- Carl Anderson, Fantasy Hotel (GRP, 1992)
- Roy Ayers, Ubiquity (Polydor, 1970)
- Donald Byrd, Caricatures (Blue Note, 1976)
- Doug Carn, Spirit of the New Land (Black Jazz, 1972)
- Norman Connors, Dance of Magic (Cobblestone, 1972)
- Joe Cuba, Cocinando La Salsa (Fania, 2008)
- Betty Davis, Crashin' from Passion (P-Vine, 1995)
- Miles Davis, Dingo (Warner Bros., 1991)
- Gil Evans, Gil Evans (Ampex, 1970)
- Roberta Flack, Feel Like Makin' Love (Atlantic, 1974)
- Rodney Franklin, Learning to Love (Columbia, 1982)
- Carlos Garnett, The New Love (Muse, 1978)
- Tim Hardin, Bird on a Wire (Columbia, 1971)
- Bobbi Humphrey, Dig This! (Blue Note, 1972)
- Paul Jackson, Black Octopus (Eastworld, 1978)
- Paul Jackson Jr., Never Alone (Blue Note, 1996)
- Alphonso Johnson, Moonshadows (Epic, 1976)
- Kimiko Kasai, Butterfly (CBS/Sony, 1979)
- John Klemmer, Magic and Movement (Impulse!, 1974)
- Joachim Kühn, Hip Elegy (MPS/BASF, 1976)
- Rolf Kühn, Cucu Ear (MPS, 1980)
- Azar Lawrence, Prayer for My Ancestors (Furthermore, 2008)
- Les McCann, Invitation to Openness (Atlantic, 1972)
- Eugene McDaniels, Headless Heroes of the Apocalypse (Atlantic, 1971)
- Al Di Meola, Land of the Midnight Sun (Columbia, 1976)
- Patrick Moraz, The Story of I (Atlantic, 1976)
- Teruo Nakamura, Unicorn (Three Blind Mice, 1973)
- Tony Newton, Mysticism & Romance (NCI, 1978)
- Passport, Talk Back (WEA, 1988)
- Freda Payne, Supernatural High (Capitol, 1978)
- Wayne Shorter, Odyssey of Iska (Blue Note, 1971)
- Jeremy Steig, Temple of Birth (Columbia, 1975)
- Charles Sullivan, Genesis (Strata-East, 1974)
- Bill Summers, Feel the Heat (Prestige, 1977)
- Narada Michael Walden, Sending Love to Everyone (Walden, 1995)
- Torsten de Winkel, Mastertouch (EMI, 1985)
