= Steve Marcus =

American jazz musician (1939–2005)

Steve Marcus (September 18, 1939 – September 25, 2005) was an American jazz saxophonist.

== Biography ==
Marcus was born in The Bronx, New York, United States. He studied at the Berklee College of Music in Boston, Massachusetts, between 1959 and 1961. He gained experience playing in the bands of Stan Kenton, Herbie Mann and Larry Coryell from 1963 to 1973. His first album as a leader included an arrangement of the Beatles' song, "Tomorrow Never Knows". He worked with jazz drummer Buddy Rich for the last twelve years of Rich's life. After Rich died, Marcus led the band and renamed it Buddy's Buddies.

His song "Half a Heart" (1968) has a riff very similar to the famous saxophone riff of "Baker Street" by Gerry Rafferty (recorded in 1977, released in 1978).

Marcus died in September 2005 in New Hope, Pennsylvania.

== Discography ==
=== As leader/co-leader ===
- Tomorrow Never Knows (Vortex, 1968)
- Count's Rock Band (Vortex, 1969)
- The Lord's Prayer (Vortex, 1969)
- Green Line with Miroslav Vitous, Sonny Sharrock, Daniel Humair (Nivico, 1970)
- Something with Jiro Inagaki & Soul Media (Nippon Columbia, 1971) – recorded in 1970
- Sometime Other Than Now (Flying Dutchman, 1976)
- Steve Marcus & 2o1 (Red Baron, 1992)
- Smile (Red Baron, 1993)
- Count's Jam Band Reunion (Tone Center, 2001) – recorded in 2000
- Steve Marcus Project (Mighty Quinn Productions, 2007)

=== As a member ===
The Jazz Composer's Orchestra

- The Jazz Composers Orchestra (JCOA, 1968)[2LP]

Bob Thiele Collective

- Lion Hearted (Red Baron, 1993)

=== As sideman ===
With Larry Coryell

- Barefoot Boy (Flying Dutchman, 1971)
- Offering (Vanguard, 1972)
- The Real Great Escape (Vanguard, 1973)

With Stan Kenton

- Stan Kenton / Jean Turner (Capitol, 1963)
- Artistry in Bossa Nova (Capitol, 1963)

With others

- Gary Burton, Tennessee Firebird (RCA, 1967)
- Herbie Mann, Live at the Whisky a Go Go (Atlantic, 1969) – live
- Young Rascals, Once Upon a Dream (Atlantic, 1968)
