= Coryell (album) =

Studio album by Larry Coryell
- Released: 1969
- Studio: Apostolic (New York)
- Genre: Jazz fusion, psychedelic rock
- Length: 39:37
- Label: Vanguard
- Producer: Daniel Weiss

Larry Coryell chronology
Lady Coryell (1968)	Coryell (1969)	Spaces (1970)

Coryell is an album by jazz guitarist Larry Coryell, released in 1969 by Vanguard Records. The album was produced by Daniel Weiss and engineered by David Baker, Paul Berkowitz and Randy Rand.

== Reception ==
Professional ratings
Review scores
Source	Rating
AllMusic	4/5 stars
Christgau's Record Guide	B+
The Penguin Guide to Jazz Recordings	3/4 stars
The Rolling Stone Jazz Record Guide	4/5 stars

Mark Allan of AllMusic calls the album a "strong outing" from "this sensational guitarist", singling out the track "The Jam with Albert". He says Coryell's "masterful playing is especially impressive compared to his ill-advised singing".

== Track listing ==
All tracks are written by Larry Coryell except where noted.

No.	Title	Length
1.	"Sex"	3:54
2.	"Beautiful Woman"	4:36
3.	"The Jam with Albert"	9:19
4.	"Elementary Guitar Solo #5"	6:52
5.	"No One Really Knows" (Julie Coryell, Larry Coryell)	5:08
6.	"Morning Sickness"	5:22
7.	"Ah Wuv Ooh" (Julie Coryell, Larry Coryell)	4:24

== Personnel ==
- Larry Coryell – guitar, bass, keyboards, vocals
- Mike Mandel – keyboards
- Chuck Rainey – guitar, bass guitar
- Mervin Bronson – bass guitar
- Albert Stinson – bass guitar

Guests

- Jim Pepper – flute, saxophone
- Ron Carter – bass
- Bernard Purdie – drums

Production

- David Baker – engineering
- Paul Berkowitz – engineering
- Daniel Weiss – producer
- Julie Coryell – liner notes
- Ed Friedner – mixing
- Randy Rand – engineering
- Mike Sullivan – cover design, photo design
- Jules E. Halfant – cover design
