= L'Oiseau de Feu, Petrouchka =

Studio album by Larry Coryell
- Released: 1983
- Recorded: March 21–22, 1983
- Studio: Mediasound, New York City
- Genre: Jazz
- Length: 38:42
- Label: Philips
- Producer: Teo Macero

Larry Coryell chronology
Bolero (1981)	L'Oiseau de Feu, Petrouchka (1983)	Just Like Being Born (1984)

Professional ratings
Review scores
Source	Rating
Allmusic	2/5 stars

L'Oiseau de Feu, Petrouchka is a solo album by American guitarist Larry Coryell that was released by Philips Records in 1983.

== Reception ==
Allmusic awarded the album with 2 stars.

== Track listing ==
1. "L'Oiseau de Feu" (Igor Stravinsky, Larry Coryell) – 16:46
  1. Introduction
  2. L'Oiseau de feu et sa Danse
  3. Variation de l'Oiseau de feu
  4. Ronde des princesses
  5. Dance infernale du roi Kashchei
  6. Berceuse
  7. Finale
2. "Petrouchka" (Igor Stravinsky, Larry Coryell) – 21:56
  1. First Scene
  2. Second Scene
  3. Third Scene
  4. Fourth Scene

== Personnel ==
- Larry Coryell – guitar
