= Cedars of Avalon =

Studio album by Larry Coryell
- Released: September 17, 2002
- Recorded: December 4, 2001
- Studio: Van Gelder, Englewood Cliffs, NJ
- Genre: Jazz
- Length: 58:12
- Label: HighNote; HCD 7093
- Producer: Don Sickler

Larry Coryell chronology
Inner Urge (2001)	Cedars of Avalon (2002)	The Power Trio Live in Chicago (2002)

Cedars of Avalon is an album by guitarist Larry Coryell, recorded in 2001 and released on the HighNote label the following year.

== Reception ==
Professional ratings
Review scores
Source	Rating
AllMusic	4/5 stars
The Penguin Guide to Jazz Recordings	3/4 stars

In his review on AllMusic, Ken Dryden states "One gets the feeling that the musicians were so comfortable playing together that they were actually a working quartet; the feeling of each track is of first-take freshness while being as close to perfection as possible... This is yet another outstanding release by Larry Coryell". On All About Jazz, C. Andrew Hovan called it a "most enjoyable mainstream set that might surprise some Coryell fanatics but which will easily please all".

== Track listing ==
All compositions by Larry Coryell except where noted

1. "Cedars of Avalon" – 5:14
2. "Bemsha Swing" (Denzil Best, Thelonious Monk) – 7:44
3. "Fantasy in D" (Cedar Walton) – 6:34
4. "Theme for Ernie" (Fred Lacey) – 7:01
5. "Limehouse Blues" (Philip Braham, Douglas Furber) – 2:37
6. "D-Natural Blues" (Wes Montgomery) – 6:28
7. "What's New?" (Bob Haggart, Johnny Burke) – 7:29
8. "Newest Blues" (Walton) – 6:12
9. "It Could Happen to You" (Jimmy Van Heusen, Burke) – 6:11
10. "Shapes" – 2:42

== Personnel ==
- Larry Coryell – guitar
- Cedar Walton – piano (tracks 1–4 & 6–9)
- Buster Williams – bass (tracks 1–4 & 6–9)
- Billy Drummond – drums (tracks 1–4 & 6–9)
