= Piano Jazz: McPartland/Costello =

Live album by Marian McPartland with guest Elvis Costello
- Released: 12 July 2005
- Recorded: 6 May 2003
- Genre: Vocal Jazz
- Length: 53:31
- Label: JVC Japan; Jazz Alliance
- Producer: Shari Hutchinson

Marian McPartland with guest Elvis Costello chronology
Il Sogno (2004)	Piano Jazz: McPartland/Costello (2005)	My Flame Burns Blue (2006)

Piano Jazz, Piano Jazz: McPartland/Costello or Maria McPartland's Piano Jazz(2005) is an album by Marian McPartland, in collaboration with Elvis Costello. The album is a collaboration between Costello and McPartand made for the NPR radio program Piano Jazz. The album expresses Mcpartland's interpretation of standards and ballads.

== Track listing ==
No.	Title	Length
1.	"Conversation"	2:47
2.	"At Last"	3:56
3.	"Conversation"	4:03
4.	"My Funny Valentine"	3:44
5.	"Conversation"	4:39
6.	"Almost Blue"	2:48
7.	"Conversation"	2:36
8.	"The Very Thought of You"	3:49
9.	"Conversation"	2:38
10.	"Gloomy Sunday"	3:24
11.	"Conversation"	2:11
12.	"You Don't Know What Love Is"	4:58
13.	"Conversation"	3:32
14.	"They Didn't Believe Me"	3:54
15.	"Conversation"	1:46
16.	"I'm in the Mood Again"	2:42
17.	"Conversation"	0:05
