= Level One (The Eleventh House album) =

Studio album by the Eleventh House
- Released: 1975
- Studio: Electric Lady, New York City
- Genre: Jazz, jazz fusion
- Length: 34:42
- Label: Arista
- Producer: Skip Drikwater, Vince Cirrincione Tom Tom Paine

Larry Coryell chronology
Introducing Eleventh House with Larry Coryell (1974)	Level One (1975)	The Restful Mind (1975)

Professional ratings
Review scores
Source	Rating
AllMusic	4/5 stars

Level One is an album by Larry Coryell and the Eleventh House, released in 1975 by Arista Records. The album reached number 23 on Billboard magazine's jazz album chart and number 163 on the Billboard Top LPs chart. Robert Taylor states in his AllMusic review, "This is a forgotten gem from the fusion era."

== Track listing ==
=== Side one ===
1. "Level One" (Mike Mandel) – 3:02
2. "The Other Side" (Michael Lawrence) – 4:35
3. "Diedra" (Mandel) – 3:56
4. "Some Greasy Stuff" (Alphonze Mouzon) – 3:30
5. "Nyctaphobia" (Mouzon) – 4:04

=== Side two ===
1. "Suite" (Larry Coryell) – 5:32

A. Entrance
B. Repose
C. Exit

2. "Eyes of Love" (Coryell) – 2:25
3. "Struttin' with Sunshine" (Coryell) – 3:20
4. "That's the Joint" (John Lee) – 4:03

== Personnel ==
- Larry Coryell – guitar
- Michael Lawrence – flugelhorn, trumpet
- Mike Mandel – keyboards
- Steve Khan – 12-string guitar on "Level One"
- John Lee – bass guitar
- Alphonse Mouzon – drums, percussion

== Chart performance ==
Chart (1975)	Peak position
US Billboard Top LPs & Tape	163
US Billboard Jazz Albums	23
