= The Real Great Escape =

Studio album by Larry Coryell
- Released: 1973
- Recorded: 1973
- Studio: 23rd Street, New York
- Genre: Jazz fusion, psychedelic rock
- Length: 35:48
- Label: Vanguard
- Producer: Daniel Weiss

Larry Coryell chronology
Offering (1972)	The Real Great Escape (1973)	Introducing Eleventh House with Larry Coryell (1974)

Professional ratings
Review scores
Source	Rating
AllMusic	1.5/5 stars
Christgau's Record Guide	B−
The Penguin Guide to Jazz Recordings	2/4 stars
The Rolling Stone Jazz Record Guide	4/5 stars

The Real Great Escape is Larry Coryell's eighth album as a leader. The album was released 1973 on the Vanguard label featuring Steve Marcus on saxophone, Mervin Bronson on bass, Mike Mandel on keyboards, Harry Wilkinson on drums. The album peaked number 35 on the Jazz Albums chart.

== Track listing ==
Side one

1. "The Real Great Escape" (Larry Coryell) – 7:33
2. "Are You Too Clever" (Julie Coryell) – 5:24
3. "Love Life's Offering" (Larry Coryell) – 3:21

Side two

1. "Makes Me Want To Shout" (Larry Coryell) – 5:23
2. "All My Love's Laughter" (Jimmy Webb) – 4:23
3. "Scotland II" (Julie Coryell, Larry Coryell) – 5:03
4. "P.F. Sloan" (Jimmy Webb) – 4:01

Sources: and

== Personnel ==
Adapted from AllMusic and the album's liner notes.

Band

- Mervin Bronson – bass
- Larry Coryell – guitar, ARP synthesizer, vocals
- Mike Mandel – piano, ARP Synthesizer
- Steve Marcus – soprano sax, tenor sax
- Harry Wilkinson – drums

Additional musicians

- Earl DeRouen – congas
- Julie Coryell – additional vocals
- Bryan Wells – horn arrangements

Production

- Joel Brodsky – photography
- Vince Cirrincione – direction
- Tom Paine – direction
- Danny Weiss – producer
- Jeff Zaraya – engineer
- Jules Halfant – art direction and design

== Chart performance ==
Chart (1973)	Peak position
U.S. Billboard Jazz Albums	35
