= Introducing Eleventh House with Larry Coryell =

Introducing the Eleventh House with Larry Coryell

Studio album by the Eleventh House
- Released: May 1974
- Recorded: June 1973
- Studio: Vanguard 23rd Street Studio, New York City
- Genre: Jazz fusion
- Length: 44:22
- Label: Vanguard
- Producer: Danny Weiss

Larry Coryell chronology
The Real Great Escape (1973)	Introducing the Eleventh House with Larry Coryell (1974)	Level One (1975)

Professional ratings
Review scores
Source	Rating
AllMusic	4.5/5 stars
Christgau's Record Guide	B−
Creem	B+
The Rolling Stone Jazz Record Guide	5/5 stars

Introducing the Eleventh House with Larry Coryell is the debut album by the Eleventh House, released in 1974 by Vanguard Records.

== Track listing ==
No.	Title	Length
1.	"Birdfingers" (Coryell)	3:10
2.	"The Funky Waltz" (Mouzon)	5:12
3.	"Low-Lee-Tah" (Coryell)	4:20
4.	"Adam Smasher" (Mandel)	4:33
5.	"Joy Ride" (Mandel)	6:11
6.	"Yin" (Wolfgang Dauner)	6:06
7.	"Theme for a Dream" (Coryell)	3:29
8.	"Gratitude A So Low" (Coryell)	3:24
9.	"Ism-Ejercicio" (Coryell)	4:02
10.	"Right on Y'all" (Mouzon)	4:20

== Personnel ==
- Randy Brecker – French horn, trumpet
- Larry Coryell – guitar
- Mike Mandel – piano, synthesizer
- Danny Trifan – bass
- Alphonse Mouzon – drums, percussion
