= The Restful Mind =

Studio album by Larry Coryell
- Released: 1975
- Studio: 23rd Street, New York City
- Genre: Jazz fusion
- Length: 34:28
- Label: Vanguard
- Producer: Daniel Weiss

Larry Coryell chronology
Level One (1975)	The Restful Mind (1975)	Planet End (1975)

The Restful Mind is an album by jazz guitarist Larry Coryell. It was recorded at Vanguard Records' New York City studio, and was released by Vanguard in 1975. It features Coryell on acoustic and electric guitars, along with three of the four members of the band Oregon, who were also recording for Vanguard at the time: Ralph Towner appears on guitar, Glen Moore on bass, and Collin Walcott on percussion. The album includes improvisations on two compositions by the French Baroque composer Robert de Visée, an adaptation of Maurice Ravel's "Pavane pour une infante défunte" (here translated as "Pavane for a Dead Princess"), and four Coryell originals.

Tracks from the album were reissued on the 2000 anthology String Alchemy: From Eclectic to Electric, as well as the Oregon compilation albums Jade Muse: The Best of Oregon (2003) and Best of the Vanguard Years (2006).

== Reception ==
Professional ratings
Review scores
Source	Rating
AllMusic	4/5 stars
The Penguin Guide to Jazz Recordings	4/4 stars
The Rolling Stone Jazz Record Guide	4/5 stars

In a review for AllMusic, Robert Taylor noted that the album features "a more reflective and relaxed Coryell," and commented: "His tendency to fall back on his chops was always a weak spot in his playing, but it is thankfully absent here. Both of the 'Improvisation' pieces are highlights in Coryell's career, which along with the other beautiful selections, make this one of his best, and certainly most overlooked, recordings."

The authors of The Penguin Guide to Jazz called The Restful Mind "a very special record that manages to avoid all the pitfalls usually associated with crossover projects that aim to marry jazz and classical music," and wrote: "This is Coryell at his thoughtful best and a long way removed from the Hendrix-inspired wailer of former years... it comes across as fresh and as inventive as ever."

== Track listing ==
All tracks written by Larry Coryell, except where noted

=== Side one ===
1. "Improvisation on Robert de Visee's Menuet II" – 8:13
2. "Ann Arbor" – 5:01
3. "Pavane for a Dead Princess" (Maurice Ravel) – 5:40

=== Side two ===
1. "Improvisation on Robert de Visee's Sarabande" – 5:20
2. "Song for Jim Webb" – 3:15
3. "Julie La Belle" – 4:07
4. "The Restful Mind" – 3:12

== Personnel ==
- Larry Coryell – acoustic guitar, electric guitar
- Ralph Towner – guitar
- Glen Moore – double bass
- Collin Walcott – congas, tabla

Production

- Producer – Daniel Weiss
- Engineer – David Baker
