= Fairyland (album) =

Live album by Larry Coryell
- Released: 1971
- Recorded: June 18, 1971
- Venue: Montreux Jazz Festival, Montreux, Switzerland
- Genre: Jazz fusion
- Length: 32:12
- Label: Mega/Flying Dutchman
- Producer: Bob Thiele

Larry Coryell chronology
Larry Coryell at the Village Gate (1971)	Fairyland (1971)	Barefoot Boy (1971)

Professional ratings
Review scores
Source	Rating
Allmusic	3/5 stars

Fairyland is a live album by jazz guitarist Larry Coryell. All songs were recorded on June 18, 1971 at the Montreux Jazz Festival in Switzerland and originally released by Mega Records on their Flying Dutchman Series. Coryell is accompanied by Chuck Rainey on bass and Bernard Purdie on drums.

== Track listing ==
All tracks are written by Larry Coryell except where noted.

No.	Title	Length
1.	"Souls Dirge"	9:39
2.	"Eskdalemuir"	8:38
3.	"Stones" (Doug Davis)	7:08
4.	"Further Explorations for Albert Stinson"	6:47

== Personnel ==
- Larry Coryell – guitar, vocals
- Chuck Rainey – bass
- Bernard Purdie – drums
