= Larry Coryell at the Village Gate =

1971 live album by Larry Coryell

Live at the Village Gate

Live album by Larry Coryell
- Released: 1971
- Recorded: January 21–22, 1971
- Venue: Village Gate, New York City
- Genre: Jazz, jazz fusion
- Length: 36:55
- Label: Vanguard
- Producer: Jack Lothrop

Larry Coryell chronology
Spaces (1970)	Live at the Village Gate (1971)	Fairyland (1971)

Professional ratings
Review scores
Source	Rating
AllMusic	4/5 stars
Christgau's Record Guide	B+
The Penguin Guide to Jazz Recordings	3/4 stars
The Rolling Stone Jazz Record Guide	3/5 stars

Larry Coryell at the Village Gate is a live album by jazz guitarist Larry Coryell that was recorded on January 21 and 22, 1971, at the Village Gate in New York City. It was released by Vanguard Records. This was the first Coryell album on which his wife Julie sang. The album included a cover version of a song by Jack Bruce with whom Coryell toured in 1968.

Rolling Stone stated the album showed Coryell with a power-trio in rock form. In his memoir, Coryell stated that Bronson and Wilkinson formed a tight rhythm section, although it may seem an odd combination. His son Murali appeared on the album jacket.

== Track listing ==
No.	Title	Length
1.	"The Opening" (Larry Coryell)	6:30
2.	"After Later" (Larry Coryell)	6:01
3.	"Entardecendo en Saudade" (Chick Corea)	8:02
4.	"Can You Follow?" (Jack Bruce)	9:33
5.	"Beyond These Chilling Winds" (Larry Coryell, Julie Coryell)	8:05

== Personnel ==
- Larry Coryell – guitar, vocals
- Julie Coryell – vocals on "Beyond These Chilling Winds"
- Mervin Bronson – bass
- Harry Wilkinson – drums
