= Mind Transplant =

Studio album by Alphonse Mouzon
- Released: 1975
- Recorded: December 4–6, 9–10, 1974
- Genre: Jazz-funk, fusion
- Length: 33:03
- Label: Blue Note
- Producer: Skip Drinkwater

Alphonse Mouzon chronology
Funky Snakefoot (1973)	Mind Transplant (1975)	The Man Incognito (1976)

Mind Transplant is the third album by American jazz drummer Alphonse Mouzon recorded in 1974 and released on the Blue Note label.

== Reception ==
The AllMusic review by Robert Taylor awarded the album 4½ stars stating "Raw and powerful, the music herein is what made fusion such a viable musical style... Easily one of the best fusion recordings of all time".

Professional ratings
Review scores
Source	Rating
AllMusic	4.5/5 stars
The Rolling Stone Jazz Record Guide	1/5 stars

== Track listing ==
All compositions by Elvena Mouzon

1. "Mind Transplant" - 4:05
2. "Snow Bound" - 3:05
3. "Carbon Dioxide" - 4:38
4. "Ascorbic Acid" - 3:26
5. "Happiness Is Loving You" - 4:09
6. "Some of the Things People Do" - 3:40
7. "Golden Rainbows" - 6:56
8. "Nitroglycerin" - 3:04

- Recorded at Wally Heider Sound Studio III in Los Angeles, California on December 4 (tracks 2, 5 & 7), December 5 (track 6), December 6 (tracks 3 & 8) and December 9 & 10 (tracks 1 & 3), 1974

== Personnel ==
- Alphonse Mouzon - drums, vocals, synthesizer, electric piano, organ, arranger, conductor
- Jerry Peters - electric piano, organ
- Tommy Bolin, Lee Ritenour - guitar
- Jay Graydon - guitar, voice bag on "Snow Bound", programming
- Henry Davis - electric bass

Produced by Skip Drinkwater Arranged By Alphonse Mouzon
