= Boléro (Larry Coryell album) =

Studio album by Larry Coryell
- Released: 1981
- Recorded: April 18, 1981 – November 1983
- Studio: Tonstudio, Stuttgart, Germany; Scovil Productions, Norwalk, Connecticut
- Genre: Jazz, jazz fusion
- Length: 58:51
- Label: String
- Producer: Gabriel Kleinschmidt, Brian Keane

Larry Coryell chronology
Comin' Home (1979)	Boléro (1981)	L'Oiseau de Feu, Petrouchka (1983)

Alternative cover
- 1993 CD Release

Boléro is an album by jazz guitarist Larry Coryell that was released by String Records in 1981. The album was released on CD in 1993 by Evidence and includes the tracks from the LP At the Airport (1983) recorded with guitarist Brian Keane.

== Reception ==
Professional ratings
Review scores
Source	Rating
AllMusic	4/5 stars
The Penguin Guide to Jazz	2.5/4 stars

AllMusic awarded the album with 4 out of 5 stars. The Penguin Guide to Jazz review gave 2.5 stars out of 4 and said, "Coryell had already tackled Ravel (and Robert de Visee) on The Restful Mind and it was inevitable that he would add "Boléro" to "Pavane for a Dead Princess". Ravel was a perfectly logical focus for Coryell and he also tackles the prelude from "Le Tombeau De Couperin", lending it an elaborate contrapuntal feel that almost buries the intriguing modal progression that links it to the gypsy and flamenco traditions that intrigue both men."

Coryell performed the "Improvisation on Boléro" at the Guitar Legends Festival in Seville, October 1991.

== Track listing ==
1. "Improvisation on Boléro" (Maurice Ravel) – 7:27
2. "Nothing is Forever" (Coryell) – 3:20
3. "Something for Wolfgang Amadeus" (Coryell) – 3:53
4. "Prelude from Tombeau de Couperin" (Ravel) – 1:42
5. "Elegancia Del Sol" (Coryell) – 3:37
6. "Fancy Frogs" (Coryell) – 3:55
7. "6th Watch Hill Road" (Coryell) – 4:09
8. "Blues in Madrid" (Coryell) – 3:03
9. "Motel Time" (Coryell) – 1:51
10. "At The Airport" (Keane, S. Schneider) – 4:30
11. "Brazilia" (Keane) – 7:18
12. "A Piece for Larry" (Keane) – 2:42
13. "La Pluie" (Coryell) – 3:35
14. "Waltz No.6" (Coryell) – 4:26
15. "Logical Solution" (Keane) – 3:52
16. "Warm Weather" (Keane) – 2:40
17. "Patty's Song" (Keane) – 2:52
18. "Lines" (Coryell) – 6:07

== Personnel ==
- Larry Coryell – 6-string and 12-string guitars
- Brian Keane – 6-string and 12-string guitars
