= Lady Coryell =

Studio album by Larry Coryell
- Released: 1969
- Recorded: 1968
- Genre: Jazz, jazz fusion
- Length: 39:29
- Label: Vanguard
- Producer: Larry Coryell, Danny Weiss

Larry Coryell chronology
Lady Coryell (1969)	Coryell (1969)

Lady Coryell is the debut album by jazz fusion guitarist Larry Coryell, recorded when he was 25.

== Reception ==
Professional ratings
Review scores
Source	Rating
AllMusic	3/5 stars
The Penguin Guide to Jazz Recordings	3/4 stars
The Rolling Stone Jazz Record Guide	3/5 stars
The Village Voice	B+

Lady Coryell was mostly ignored upon release but later received positive reviews. Robert Christgau stated, "Larry Coryell is the greatest thing to happen to the guitar since stretched gut" and "this is far more satisfying but still crabbed and uneven". The Rolling Stone Jazz Record Guide had a mostly positive review, saying that Larry Coryell was "one of the most creative and accomplished modern electric guitarists." Jim Todd, writing for AllMusic, stated, "This 1968 set is for anyone who felt let down when the early '70s promise for a truly creative, genre-busting fusion of jazz and rock swiftly disappeared in a wave of vapid, show biz values and disco frippery", but also stated that "the album's only lapse is the country corn of 'Love Child Is Coming Home', where Coryell tries to transcend one genre too many."

== Track listing ==
All tracks are written by Larry Coryell except where noted.

No.	Title	Length
1.	"Herman Wright"	3:21
2.	"Sunday Telephone"	2:27
3.	"Two Minute Classical"	2:08
4.	"Love Child Is Coming Home"	2:31
5.	"Lady Coryell"	6:31
6.	"The Dream Thing"	2:23
7.	"Treats Style" (Jimmy Garrison)	5:42
8.	"You Don't Know What Love Is" (Gene de Paul, Don Raye)	2:35
9.	"Stiff Neck"	7:12
10.	"Cleo's Mood" (Junior Walker)	4:20

== Personnel ==
- Larry Coryell – guitars, bass, vocals
- Jimmy Garrison – bass (on 7)
- Bob Moses – drums
- Elvin Jones – drums (on 7 and 9)
