= Shining Hour =

Studio album by Larry Coryell
- Released: 1990
- Recorded: October 20, 1989
- Studio: Van Gelder, Englewood Cliffs, NJ
- Genre: Jazz
- Length: 48:40
- Label: Muse; MR 5360
- Producer: Don Sickler

Larry Coryell chronology
| Air Dancing (1988) | Shining Hour (1990) | American Odyssey (1990) |

Shining Hour is an album by guitarist Larry Coryell, recorded in 1989 and released on the Muse label.

== Reception ==
Professional ratings
Review scores
| Source | Rating |
|---|---|
| AllMusic | 4/5 stars |
| The Penguin Guide to Jazz Recordings | 3/4 stars |

The AllMusic review by Scott Yanow stated, "Larry Coryell will always be best known for arguably being the first fusion guitarist, but his career has been quite wide-ranging ever since the late '60s. On Shining Hour, he mostly sticks to jazz standards ... Coryell, whose playing works well in this (for him) rare setting although he is not really a boppish improviser".

== Track listing ==
1. "Nefertiti" (Wayne Shorter) – 6:30
2. "Apathy Rains" (Brian Torff) – 6:20
3. "Yesterdays" (Jerome Kern, Otto Harbach) – 5:35
4. "Floyd Gets a Gig" (Larry Coryell) – 5:40
5. "The Duke" (Dave Brubeck) – 4:45
6. "My Shining Hour" (Harold Arlen, Johnny Mercer) – 5:00
7. "The Sorcerer" (Herbie Hancock) – 6:10
8. "All the Things You Are" (Kern, Oscar Hammerstein II) – 8:40

== Personnel ==
- Larry Coryell – guitar
- Kenny Barron – piano
- Buster Williams – bass
- Marvin Smith – drums
