= Diamondhead (album) =

Studio album by David "Fathead" Newman
- Released: January 29, 2008
- Recorded: October 23, 2007
- Studio: M&I Recording Studios (New York City)
- Genre: Jazz
- Length: 55:25
- Label: HighNote
- Producer: David "Fathead" Newman, Houston Person

David "Fathead" Newman chronology
Life (2007)	Diamondhead (2008)	The Blessing (2009)

Diamondhead is an album by American saxophonist David "Fathead" Newman which was recorded in 2007 and released on the HighNote label early the following year.

== Reception ==
Professional ratings
Review scores
Source	Rating
AllMusic	4/5 stars
All About Jazz	3.5/5 stars
All About Jazz	2.5/5 stars
The Penguin Guide to Jazz Recordings	3/4 stars

In his review on AllMusic, Thom Jurek states "It is a solid jazz date with some wonderful post-hard bop and soul-jazz touches here. ... This is a stellar little quintet date and offers living proof that Walton, Fuller, and Newman show no signs of slowing down". On All About Jazz, Douglas Payne noted "David "Fathead" Newman has had a remarkably consistent recording career over the last half century (and markedly prolific since signing onto HighNote) and Diamondhead is one of the purest of pleasures in his capacious catalog" while Martin Longley was less enthusiastic writing "The Diamondhead isn't really attempting any innovation, so he can hardly be dismissed for this album's lack of surprises. On the level of a relaxed, inviting glide, it's a very organic, warm-hearted set"

== Track listing ==
All compositions by David Newman except where noted.

1. "Diamondhead" – 7:40
2. "Can't We Be Friends?" (Paul James, Kay Swift) – 5:24
3. "New York State of Mind" (Billy Joel) – 4:27
4. "Cedar's Blues" (Cedar Walton) – 5:35
5. "My Full House" – 5:40
6. "Skylark" (Hoagy Carmichael, Johnny Mercer) – 7:27
7. "Star Eyes" (Gene de Paul, Don Raye) – 7:36
8. "Mama-Lou" – 5:17
9. "It's You or No One" (Jule Styne Sammy Cahn) – 6:19

== Personnel ==
- David "Fathead" Newman – tenor saxophone, alto saxophone, flute
- Curtis Fuller – trombone
- Cedar Walton – piano
- Peter Washington – bass
- Yoron Israel – drums
