= Monk, Trane, Miles & Me =

Studio album by Larry Coryell
- Released: January 26, 1999
- Recorded: May 28, 1998
- Studio: Van Gelder, Englewood Cliffs, NJ
- Genre: Jazz
- Length: 56:34
- Label: HighNote; HCD 7028
- Producer: Don Sickler

Larry Coryell chronology
Cause and Effect (1998)	Monk, Trane, Miles & Me (1999)	New High (2001)

Monk, Trane, Miles & Me is an album by the guitarist Larry Coryell, recorded in 1998 and released on the HighNote label the following year.

== Reception ==
Professional ratings
Review scores
Source	Rating
AllMusic	4.5/5 stars
The Penguin Guide to Jazz Recordings	3.5/4 stars

In his review on AllMusic, Michael G. Nastos states: "This recording properly acknowledges Coryell's main influences, swings nicely, delves into his under-appreciated mellow side, and reaffirms his status as an enduring jazz guitarist who still has plenty to say ... this finely crafted recording ranks with any of his many better-to-best dates". In JazzTimes, Jim Ferguson wrote: "Once a young lion of jazz guitar, Coryell is gradually becoming one of its greatest seasoned veterans, as this material strongly suggests".

== Track listing ==
All compositions by Larry Coryell except where noted

1. "Star Eyes" (Gene DePaul, Don Raye) – 6:45
2. "Alone Together" (Arthur Schwartz, Howard Dietz) – 5:48
3. "Trinkle, Tinkle" (Thelonious Monk) – 5:30
4. "Fairfield County Blues" – 5:59
5. "Patience" (Santi Debriano) – 7:12
6. "Up 'Gainst the Wall" (John Coltrane) – 6:24
7. "Naima" (Coltrane) – 6:09
8. "All Blues" (Miles Davis) – 7:39
9. "Almost a Waltz" – 5:08

== Personnel ==
- Larry Coryell – guitar
- Willie Williams – tenor saxophone (tracks 3 & 6)
- John Hicks – piano (tracks 1, 4, 5 & 7)
- Santi Debriano – bass
- Yoron Israel – drums
