= The Blessing (David "Fathead" Newman album) =

Studio album by David "Fathead" Newman
- Released: May 5, 2009
- Recorded: December 12, 2008
- Studio: Van Gelder Studio, Englewood Cliffs, NJ
- Genre: Jazz
- Length: 55:06
- Label: HighNote; HCD 7195
- Producer: David "Fathead" Newman, Houston Person

David "Fathead" Newman chronology
Diamondhead (2008)	The Blessing (2009)

The Blessing is the final studio album by American saxophonist David "Fathead" Newman, recorded in the year 2008 and released under HighNote label the following year (2009).

== Reception ==
Professional ratings
Review scores
Source	Rating
Allmusic	4.5/5 stars

In his review on Allmusic, Ken Dryden states: "David "Fathead" Newman's last recording session took place just a few weeks before his death from pancreatic cancer. Although he obviously doesn't exhibit the power heard on his earlier recordings, like Charlie Rouse and Stan Getz before him (fellow cancer victims who recorded not long prior to their deaths), Newman more than holds his own throughout the date... Newman benefited from frequent recording opportunities with HighNote during his last years, and he went on top with this fine effort.". On All About Jazz, Andrew Velez observed: "What an apt name The Blessing is for David Newman's final recording before his death ended a long career last January (2009). He played for more than a decade with Ray Charles and alongside Herbie Mann, Aretha Franklin and Roy Ayers, among many others. For this last studio session he was in fine form".

== Track listing ==
1. "SKJ" (Milt Jackson) – 6:23
2. "Someone to Watch Over Me" (George Gershwin, Ira Gershwin) – 5:47
3. "As Time Goes By" (Herman Hupfeld) – 4:55
4. "Manhã de Carnaval" (Luiz Bonfá, Antônio Maria) – 5:27
5. "Smile" (Charlie Chaplin) – 6:33
6. "Romantic Night" (David Leonhardt) – 7:31
7. "Chelsea Bridge" (Billy Strayhorn) – 5:59
8. "Whispers of Contentment" (Leonhardt) – 5:24
9. "The Blessing" (David "Fathead" Newman) – 7:07

== Personnel ==
- David "Fathead" Newman – tenor saxophone, flute
- Steve Nelson – vibraphone
- David Leonhardt – piano
- Peter Bernstein – guitar
- John Menegon – bass
- Yoron Israel – drums
