= Aspects (The Eleventh House album) =

Studio album by Larry Coryell and The Eleventh House
- Released: 1976
- Recorded: 1976
- Studio: 23rd Street Studio, New York City
- Genre: Jazz, jazz fusion
- Label: Arista
- Producer: Danny Weiss

Larry Coryell chronology
Planet End (1975)	Aspects (1976)	The Lion and the Ram (1977)

Professional ratings
Review scores
Source	Rating
Allmusic	2/5 stars
The Rolling Stone Jazz Record Guide	3/5 stars

Aspects is a 1976 album by Larry Coryell and The Eleventh House.

== Track listing ==
=== Side one ===
1. "Kowloon Jag" (Larry Coryell) – 5:48
2. "Titus" (Danny Toan) – 5.30
3. "Pyramids" (Mike Mandel) – 5:22
4. "Rodrigo Reflections"* (Larry Coryell) – 4:38

=== Side two ===
1. "Yin-Yang" (John Lee, Gerry Brown) – 4:44
2. "Woman of Truth and Future" (Mike Mandel) – 6:08
3. "Ain't It Is" (John Lee) – 5:03
4. "Aspects" (Larry Coryell) – 4:25

== Personnel ==
- Larry Coryell – electric and acoustic guitars
- Terumasa Hino – trumpet, flugelhorn
- Mike Mandel – keyboards
- John Lee – bass guitar
- Gerry Brown – drums

Guests

- Randy Brecker – trumpet
- David Sanborn – alto saxophone
- Michael Brecker – tenor saxophone
- Steve Khan – acoustic guitar
- Danny Toan – rhythm guitar
- James Mtume – percussion
