= Inner Urge (Larry Coryell album) =

Studio album by Larry Coryell
- Released: January 23, 2001
- Recorded: February 23, 2000
- Studio: Van Gelder Studio, Englewood Cliffs, NJ
- Genre: Jazz
- Length: 54:57
- Label: HighNote; HCD 7064
- Producer: Don Sickler

Larry Coryell chronology
New High (2001)	Inner Urge (2001)	Cedars of Avalon (2002)

Inner Urge is an album by guitarist Larry Coryell which was recorded in 2000 and released on the HighNote label the following year.

== Reception ==
Professional ratings
Review scores
Source	Rating
Allmusic	4/5 stars

In his review on Allmusic, Ken Dryden states "This very enjoyable session is heartily recommended". All About Jazz said "The possibilities that Inner Urge offers are those, in large part, of bebop. Consistent in his presentation, Coryell remains out front on each tune as a relaxed, unpretentious and brilliant presence ... Inner Urge presents a locked-in group for the joyful exploration of jazz, which drives the inner urge of them all".

== Track listing ==
All compositions by Larry Coryell except where noted

1. "Compulsion" (Harold Land) – 5:30
2. "Abra Cadabra" (Santi Debriano) – 5:45
3. "Inner Urge" (Joe Henderson) – 5:25
4. "Tonk" (Ray Bryant) – 4:48
5. "Dolphin Dance" (Herbie Hancock) – 8:01
6. "Allegra's Ballerina Song" – 6:48
7. "In a Sentimental Mood" (Duke Ellington, Manny Kurtz, Irving Mills) – 5:50
8. "Turkish Coffee" – 3:59
9. "Terrain" (Land) – 8:51

== Personnel ==
- Larry Coryell – guitar
- Don Sickler – trumpet (tracks 1 & 9)
- John Hicks – piano (tracks 1–7 & 9)
- Santi Debriano – bass (tracks 1–3, 5–7 & 9)
- Yoron Israel – drums (tracks 1–7 & 9)
