= Early Spring (album) =

Studio album by Alphonse Mouzon
- Released: 1988
- Studio: George Tobin Recording Studios, North Hollywood, California; Juniper Recording Studio, Burbank, California
- Genre: Jazz
- Length: 47:58
- Label: Optimism Records
- Producer: Alphonse Mouzon

Alphonse Mouzon chronology
Love, Fantasy (1987)	Early Spring (1988)	As You Wish (1989)

Early Spring is a studio album by American jazz drummer Alphonse Mouzon, produced by Mouzon himself and released in 1988 via Optimism Records. The album peaked at No. 10 on the US Billboard Top Contemporary Jazz Albums chart.

== Guest performers ==
Guest artists on the album include Ronnie Laws and Ernie Watts.

== Critical reception ==
Professional ratings
Review scores
Source	Rating
AllMusic	3/5 stars

Scott Yanow of Allmusic, in a 3/5-star review, remarked "Drummer Alphonse Mouzon covers a lot of ground on this set, ranging from poppish R&B to straight jazz."

== Tracklisting ==
No.	Title	Writer(s)	Length
1.	"Early Spring"	Alphonse Mouzon	5:14
2.	"Alone in Paris"	Alphonse Mouzon	5:38
3.	"Come Fly with Me"	Alphonse Mouzon	4:03
4.	"We Almost Made It"	Alphonse Mouzon	6:03
5.	"The Lady in Red"	Alphonse Mouzon	4:32
6.	"Seven Steps to Heaven"	Miles Davis, Victor Feldman	4:17
7.	"I Can Give You Love"	Alphonse Mouzon	6:31
8.	"Waterfall"	Alphonse Mouzon	4:02
9.	"By All Means"	Alphonse Mouzon	7:38
