= Murali Coryell =

American blues guitarist and singer

Murali Coryell (born October 27, 1969) is an American blues guitarist and singer. Best known for performing live in small venues in New York State, Coryell has also opened for George Thorogood, Gregg Allman, B.B. King and Wilson Pickett. While touring the United States, he uses local session musicians for his performances rather than traveling with a regular backing band.

== Life and career ==
Murali Coryell was born to Julie Coryell and famed jazz fusion guitarist Larry Coryell. Murali's first interest was in playing the drums but, in a move he calls "inevitable", he switched to guitar at a young age. Wanting to avoid competition with his father and his brother, Julian, he perfected his own more mainstream style of soul and blues which draws comparisons to Jimi Hendrix and Carlos Santana. Others have likened his style to the Memphis soul produced by labels such as Hi and Stax Records.

Coryell graduated from Staples High School in Westport, Connecticut, in 1987. He received a BA in music theory and composition from the SUNY New Paltz Music Department in 1992.

The title of his second album 2120 was a reference to 2120 South Michigan Avenue, the address of now-defunct R&B record label Chess Records. Coryell's maternal grandmother was the actress Carol Bruce.

In 2014, Coryell was nominated for a Blues Music Award in the 'DVD of the Year' category for Adventures Live.

== Discography ==
- Eyes Wide Open (1995)
- 2120 (1999)
- The Coryells (2000) – with Larry and Julian Coryell
- Strong as I Need to Be (2003)
- The Future of Blues – EP (2005)
- Don't Blame it on Me (2007)
- The Same Damn Thing (2008)
- Sugar Lips (2009)
- Live (2012)
- Restless Mind (2014)
- Mr. Senator (2016)
- Made in Texas (2019)
