= The Eleventh House =

Jazz fusion group

- Origin: New York City, New York, U.S.
- Genres: Jazz fusion, jazz-funk
- Years active: 1973–1975; 2015–2017
- Labels: Vanguard, Arista; 429 Records
- Past members: Larry Coryell; Randy Brecker; Mike Mandel; Danny Trifan; John Lee; Alphonse Mouzon; Michael Lawrence; Terumasa Hino; Gerry Brown; Murali Coryell

The Eleventh House was a jazz fusion group of the 1970s, led by guitarist Larry Coryell. The band was formed in 1972 and disbanded in 1975. Other members included Mike Mandel (keyboards) and Alphonse Mouzon (drums). Shortly after forming (with just one gig under their belt), the band recorded their first album entitled Introducing Eleventh House with Larry Coryell in 1973, followed by Live in Montreux and Level One in 1974. The final album of their first incarnation, Aspects, was released in 1976, though Live in Montreux was their last release in 1978.

The band reunited in 2012 for some concerts and recorded a studio album Seven Secrets prior to Coryell's death on February 19, 2017. Coryell and Mouzon recorded two studio albums Back Together Again (Atlantic, 1977) and The 11th House (Pausa, 1985), whose personnel included former The Eleventh House members.

== Discography ==
=== Studio albums ===
- Introducing The Eleventh House with Larry Coryell (Vanguard, 1974)
- Level One (Arista, 1975)
- Aspects (Arista, 1976)
- Seven Secrets (Savoy, 2017)

=== Live albums ===
- Larry Coryell & The Eleventh House At Montreux (Vanguard, 1978) - recorded July 4, 1974
- Riviera '76 (LMLR, 2025)
- Larry Coryell & The Eleventh House January 1975 (Promising Music, 2014)
