= Carol Bruce =

American actress and singer (1919–2007)

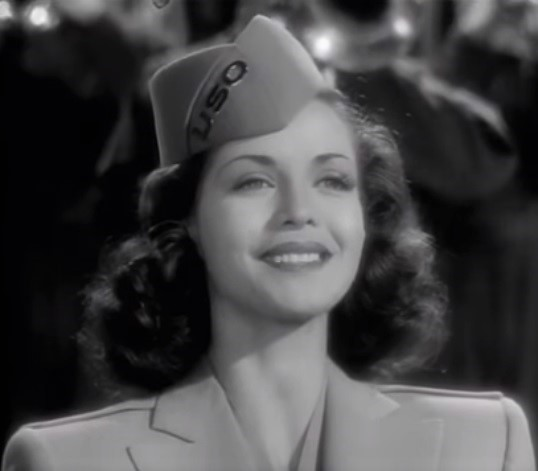
- Bruce in Keep 'Em Flying (1941)
- Born: Shirley Levy; November 15, 1919; Manhattan, New York, U.S.
- Died: October 9, 2007 (aged 87); Woodland Hills, California, U.S.
- Occupations: Actress; singer
- Years active: 1937–2000
- Spouse: Milton Nathanson (m. 1945; div. 1963)
- Children: 1

Carol Bruce (born Shirley Levy; November 15, 1919 – October 9, 2007) was an American band singer, Broadway star, and film and television actress. She had the recurring part of Mama Lillian Carlson on TV's WKRP in Cincinnati.

== Early years ==
Bruce was born Shirley Levy into a Jewish family, in Manhattan, New York, to Beatrice and Harry Levy. She had a sister, Marilyn. Because of her family's moving, she attended Jamaica High School, Girls' High School, and New Utrecht High School before graduating from Erasmus Hall High School in Brooklyn, New York. Although she studied violin for eight years, she never took singing lessons.

== Singing ==
Bruce began her career as a singer in the late 1930s with Larry Clinton and his band. She sang with Ben Bernie's orchestra in 1940–1941. She recorded several tracks, including "I'll Be Around", "Embraceable You" and "Abraham", with Red Norvo's Oversea Spotlight Band in 1943 for the war effort V-Disc program.

== Stage ==
Bruce made her Broadway debut in Louisiana Purchase, with songs by Irving Berlin, who discovered her at a nightclub in Newark, New Jersey. She was the first actress to play the role of Julie in a Broadway production of Jerome Kern and Oscar Hammerstein II's Show Boat since the 1932 Broadway revival. Bruce played the role onstage in 1946 and garnered favorable comparisons to Helen Morgan, who had originated the role onstage in 1927 and repeated it in both the 1932 revival and the 1936 film.

Her other Broadway credits include New Priorities of 1943, Along Fifth Avenue (1949), Do I Hear a Waltz?, Henry, Sweet Henry, and A Family Affair.

== Radio ==
Bruce's radio debut came on The Horn and Hardart Children's Hour. She sang on Carton of Pleasure and The Henny Youngman Show.

== Television ==
Carol Bruce played the part of Lillian Carlson in WKRP in Cincinnati, appearing in 10 of the 90 episodes. She was also in 5 of the 47 episodes of the sequel The New WKRP in Cincinnati.

== Personal life ==
Bruce's only marriage to Milton Nathanson, which ended in divorce, produced a daughter, Julie, an actress, singer and playwright who married jazz guitarist Larry Coryell. Bruce's grandchildren, Murali and Julian Coryell, are both musicians. Bruce was Jewish.

== Death ==
Bruce died from chronic obstructive pulmonary disease at the Motion Picture & Television Country House and Hospital in Woodland Hills, California, aged 87. She was survived by her sister and two grandsons. Upon her death, she was cremated and her ashes given to her cousin.

== Filmography ==
=== Film ===
Year	Title	Role	Notes
1941	This Woman Is Mine	Julie Morgan	
1941	Keep 'Em Flying	Linda Joyce	
1942	Behind the Eight Ball	Joan Barry	
1969	The Girl Who Returned	A voice role	
1980	American Gigolo	Mrs. Solan	
1987	Planes, Trains & Automobiles	Joy	
1996	The Land Before Time IV: Journey Through the Mists	Old One (Voice)	

=== Television ===
Year	Title	Role	Notes
1949	Jazz Concert	Self	Episode: #1.3
1949	The Lamb's Gambol	Self	Episode: #1.5
1949	The Fifty-Fourth Street Revue	Self	Episode: #1.1 & #1.2
1949	Cavalcade of Stars	Self	Episode: Carol Bruce, Josh White, Alice Pearce
1949–1951	The Ed Sullivan Show	Self	Episode: Tony Martin, Carol Bruce, #4.5 & The Oscar Hammerstein Story featuring Lena Horne, Wally Cox, Mimi Benzell, Robert Merrill, Charles Winninger
1950	The Silver Theatre		Episode: Happy Marriage
1950–1951	Showtime, U.S.A.	Self	Episode: #1.5 & #1.38
1951	Musical Comedy Time	Maisie Doll	Episode: Miss Liberty
1951	Studio One		Episode: The King in Yellow
1951	The Sam Levenson Show	Self	Episode: Carol Bruce and daughter
1951	This Is Show Business	Self	Episode: Binnie Barnes, Carol Bruce, Jackie Miles, Teddy Hale
1951	Wonderful Town, U.S.A.	Self	Episode: Brooklyn
1952	The Milton Berle Show	Self	Episode: #4.35
1952	The Eyes Have It	Self	Episode: Carol Bruce, Rudy Vallee
1952	Curtain Call		Episode: The Promise
1953	Chance of a Lifetime	Self	Episode: Carol Bruce
1954–1957	Armstrong Circle Theatre	Hurricane Diane	Episode: Hit a Blue Note, Lost $2 Billion: The Story of Hurricane Diane & Thief of Diamonds
1959	One Night Stand	Self	Episode: Lou Holtz
1960	Sounds of Home	Vidalia	TV Special
1961	The Witness	Mildred Hall	Episode: Dillinger
1963	General Hospital	Jennifer Talbot	TV series
1963	Girl Talk	Self	Episode: Carol Bruce, Marilyn Cantor Baker, Helene Hanff
1965	The Merv Griffin Show	Self	Episode: Buddy Hackett, Carol Bruce, Jay Kennedy, Dr. Cleo Dawson
1970	Love of Life	Amanda Randolph	Episode: Episode dated 13 August 1970
1979–1982	WKRP in Cincinnati	Lillian Carlson	10 episodes
1980	Charlie's Angels	Mrs. Pattison	Episode: Three for the Money
1981	Knots Landing	Annette Cunningham	Episode: Squeezeplay, Moving In & The Surprise
1984	Diff'rent Strokes	Miss Gilbert	Episode: The Wedding
1984	Too Close for Comfort	Sally Ruth	Episode: Home Is Where the Bart Is
1985	The Twilight Zone	Mrs. Whitford	Episode: Dead Woman's Shoes/Wong's Lost and Found Emporium
1986	Our House	Mrs. Findley	Episode: Home Again
1987	Rags to Riches		Episode: Pilot
1987–1988	Perfect Strangers	Mrs. 'Muffy' Endicott& Margaret	Episode: Tux for Two & High Society
1988	Marblehead Manor	Margaret Stonehill	Episode: Pilot
1989	Hooperman		Episode: In the Still of My Pants
1990	Doogie Howser, M.D.	Mrs. Beatrice Portmeyer	Episode: Academia Nuts
1991	The Golden Girls	Lucille	Episode: Older and Wiser
1991	Jake and the Fatman	Mrs. Clark	Episode: It Never Entered My Mind
1991	Equal Justice	Mrs. Thomason	Episode: What Color Are My Eyes?
1991–1992	The New WKRP in Cincinnati	Lillian 'Mama' Carlson	5 episodes
1992	The New WKRP in Cincinnati	Lillian 'Mama' Carlson	Archive footage, episode: Donovan, Don't Leave Us
1995	Live Shot	Shirley	Episode: What Price Episode?
1995	Party of Five	Sarah's Grandmother	Episode: Grand Delusions
1997	Diagnosis Murder	Constance Lockwood	Episode: The Murder of Mark Sloan
1997	Pacific Palisades	Mrs. Fitzpatrick	Episode: Desperate Measure
1997	Profiler	Petra Strauss	Episode: Three Carat Crisis

=== Short film ===
Year	Title	Role	Notes
1937	Koo Koo Korrespondance Skool	Singer	
1938	Larry Clinton and His Orchestra	Self	
1942	Swing's the Thing	Self	
1946	Headline Bands	Self	Archive footage
