= Fuzz-wah =

Fuzz-wah Pedal
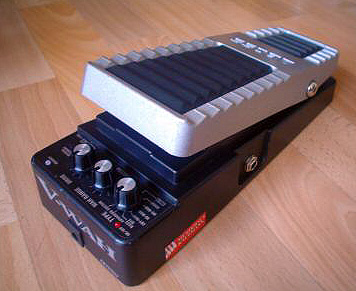
- BOSS PW-10 V-Wah combines wah-wah and other effects like distortion in a modern version of the classic pedal.

Distortion Tool
- Classification: electronophone
- Developed: 1968

Related instruments
- Fuzz, Wah-wah pedal

Musicians
- Jimi Hendrix, Jerry Garcia, Cliff Burton, Eric Clapton

A fuzz-wah pedal is an effects unit containing both a fuzzbox and wah-wah pedal in series, allowing the user to distort ("wah") and use "fuzz" sounds as aesthetic effects on electric guitar or bass. They were developed to combine the sounds of psychedelic bands of the late 1960s–'70s.

== Origin ==
The "fuzz" concept was accidentally created in Nashville in 1961 by a malfunction in bassist Grady Martin's amplifier during a solo on a track.

The Wah-wah pedal started out as a knob that was created by a British engineer and guitarist Dick Denney in hopes that the guitar would be able to imitate certain aspects of the human voice. Later on in the 1960s, guitarist Del Casher was introduced to the sound the knob could create and thought to make it into a pedal. This made it easier to use and manipulate while in the act of playing guitars, since it no longer required a hand to be used.

== Design ==
Fuzz-wah pedals normally come with at least two knobs, enabling the player to select either effect independently or together. When both are in use at once, the fuzz effect is always before the wah, allowing the wah-wah to process the richer harmonic content of the distorted sound and produce a vivid effect. The Fuzz-wah was meant to combine the two unique sounds of "fuzz" and "Wah" distortion, and make them both accessible while a guitarist was playing.

== Musicians ==
King Crimson bassist John Wetton used a fuzz-wah for his distinctive distortion sound. Jerry Garcia, guitarist of the Grateful Dead, used a Morley Fuzz Wah during that band's 1973-74 tours. Metallica's Cliff Burton used a chrome Tel-Ray Morley Power Wah Fuzz pedal for his solo sound in early days of Metallica (later switched over to Power Wah Boost in order to overdrive front end of the Mesa tube amps better for more or less identical effect). Jimi Hendrix is greatly admired by guitarists and music lovers for his wildly expressive, original sounds using fuzz and wah, but he did so with separate fuzz and wah pedals.
