= Larry Coryell =

American jazz guitarist (1943–2017)

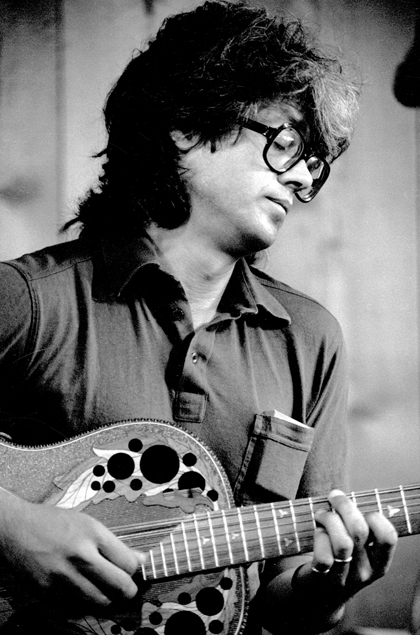
- Coryell in 1979

Background information
- Born: Lorenz Albert Van DeLinder III; April 2, 1943; Galveston, Texas, U.S.
- Died: February 19, 2017 (aged 73) New York City, U.S.
- Genres: Jazz, jazz fusion, free jazz, pop, rock, classical
- Occupation: Musician
- Instrument: Guitar
- Years active: 1965–2017
- Labels: Vanguard, Arista, Novus, Muse, Shanachie, Chesky, Wide Hive, Patuxent

Larry Coryell (born Lorenz Albert Van DeLinder III; April 2, 1943 – February 19, 2017) was an American jazz guitarist, widely considered the "godfather of fusion". Alongside Gábor Szabó, he was a pioneer in melding jazz, country and rock music. Coryell was also a music teacher and a writer, penning a monthly column for Guitar Player magazine from 1977 to 1989. He collaborated with a number of other high-profile musicians, including Miles Davis, John McLaughlin, Chick Corea, Charles Mingus, Wayne Shorter, Miroslav Vitouš, Billy Cobham, Lenny White, Emily Remler, Al Di Meola, Paco de Lucía, Steve Morse and others.

== Early life ==
Larry Coryell was born in Galveston, Texas, United States. He never knew his biological father, a musician. He was raised by his stepfather Gene, a chemical engineer, and his mother Cora, who encouraged him to learn piano when he was four years old.

In Coryell's teens, he switched to guitar. After his family moved to Richland, Washington, he took lessons from a teacher who lent him albums by Les Paul, Johnny Smith, Barney Kessel, and Tal Farlow. When asked what jazz guitar albums influenced him, Coryell cited On View at the Five Spot Cafe by Kenny Burrell, Red Norvo with Strings, and The Incredible Jazz Guitar of Wes Montgomery. He liked blues and pop music and tried to play jazz when he was eighteen. He said that hearing Wes Montgomery changed his life.

Coryell graduated from Richland High School, where he played in local bands the Jailers, the Rumblers, the Royals, and the Flames. He also played with the Checkers from Yakima. Coryell then moved to Seattle to attend the University of Washington.

== Career ==
=== 1960s ===
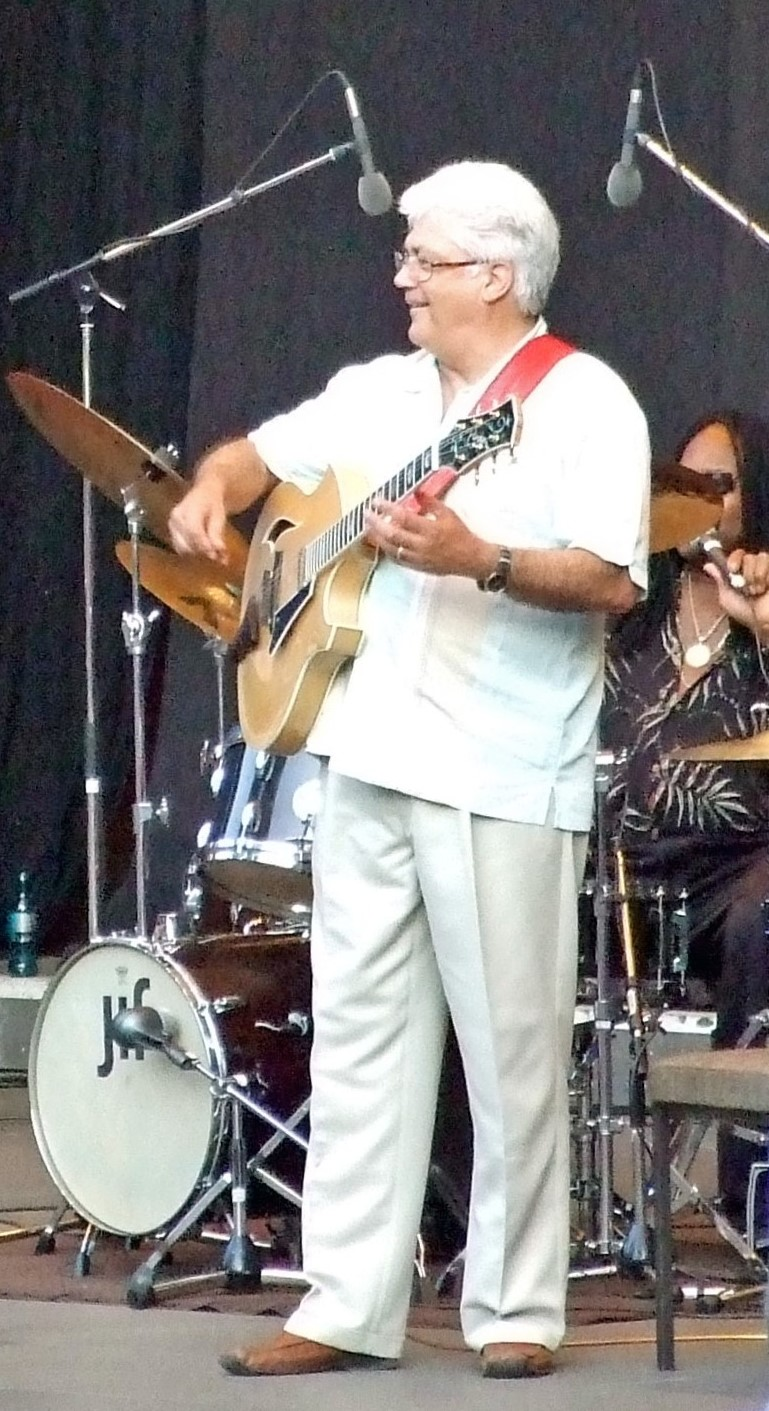
Coryell at Jazz im Palmengarten, Frankfurt am Main, 2009

In September 1965, Coryell moved to New York City, where he attended Mannes School of Music. After moving to New York, he listened to classical composers such as Bartók, Debussy, Ravel, Stravinsky, and Shostakovich.

Coryell replaced guitarist Gábor Szabó in Chico Hamilton's quintet. His challenge, at the time, was to combine the bluesy, psychedelic rock 'n' roll of Cream (especially Eric Clapton's guitar style) and The Jimi Hendrix Experience with his jazz training. Of the latter, Coryell first saw them live in 1967 at the Manhattan nightclub The Scene and was "very impressed" by them. Coryell's continued attendance to The Scene exposed him to further music of a similar ilk, catching the performances of Frank Zappa, Buddy Guy, The Velvet Underground, Stevie Winwood, The Doors and others.

In 1969, former Miles Davis Quintet drummer Tony Williams invited Coryell to join his new band, The Tony Williams Lifetime. While flattered by the invitation, he politely declined and suggested, in his place, his British friend and NY newcomer John McLaughlin, then known as "Johnny Mac." It was a career-making move for McLaughlin. Because of his tenure with the Lifetime, he was invited to join Davis's electric band, recording In a Silent Way (1969), the Bitches Brew (1970) double-album and Jack Johnson (1971).

=== 1970s ===
In the 1970s, Coryell led the group Foreplay with Mike Mandel, a friend since childhood, although the albums of this period, Barefoot Boy, Offering, and The Real Great Escape, were credited only to Larry Coryell.

In the wake of the success of John McLaughlin's Mahavishnu Orchestra he formed The Eleventh House in 1973, with drummer Alphonse Mouzon.

Their debut album, Introducing Eleventh House with Larry Coryell (1974), peaked at No. 163 in Billboard 200 and stayed 11 weeks in the charts. It was deemed unfocused and overindulgent when compared with the quintet's inspiration source, the Mahavishnu Orchestra. Coryell himself admitted to such, stating that the record was a "search party", a product of a group still in search of its identity.

Larry Coryell recorded with Al Di Meola on Return to Forever drummer Lenny White's solo debut, Venusian Summer (1975). Coryell and Di Meola traded solos on "Prince of the Sea", the album's last track. The pairing caused a stir on the fusion community, with fans wondering who played what solo. Coryell reveals this was the only time he and Di Meola played together with electric guitars.

Although enthusiastic about his contemporaries – namely Bill Connors, Allan Holdsworth, Di Meola and McLaughlin – in retrospect Coryell offered the following of mid-1970s fusion:

What happened, in my opinion, was that guitar playing just got too fast, [...] and it also got highly competitive. For years I thought, "All I want to do is become the number one-rated guitarist in DownBeat by the time I'm 30." It was that whole adolescent attitude, placing more importance on the arriving than on the striving. Everything just got so intense.

When fusion started losing steam Coryell turned to the acoustic guitar, recording duet albums with Steve Khan and Philip Catherine. The latter was responsible for Coryell's career turn, showing him in 1976 the Django Reinhardt song "Nuages". He also strengthened, in parallel, his role as a music educator. He gave private lessons and started writing a monthly column for Guitar Player magazine.

In 1978, Larry Coryell started a working relationship with Miles Davis. Davis had hip surgery and went to convalesce in Connecticut at the house of Elena Steinberg, a friend of Coryell's wife Julie. They started working on several pieces, including an unnamed "adagio" and a James Brown-like vamp in a 12/8 meter with trumpet and synthesizer. Larry Coryell recalls that his encounters with Miles Davis in the late 1970s unfolded against the backdrop of his own worsening alcoholism, and that Miles immediately perceived this vulnerability. While Davis himself kept beer chilled on the porch during his recovery in Connecticut, he casually handed Coryell a nearly empty bottle to finish and dryly remarked, “Once an alcoholic, always an alcoholic,” a comment that Coryell recognized as both perceptive and unsettling. These moments of shared drinking were not convivial bonding so much as stark reflections of mutual excess and self-awareness, occurring alongside cocaine use, erratic behavior, and physical decline. Coryell presents Miles as sharp, ironic, and unflinchingly honest about addiction, using humor and provocation rather than sympathy, and the episodes left Coryell with the sense that Miles saw through him completely—understanding his struggles even as both men remained trapped in destructive patterns at the time.

A year later Coryell formed The Guitar Trio with John McLaughlin and Paco de Lucia. The group toured Europe briefly, releasing a video recorded at Royal Albert Hall in London entitled Meeting of the Spirits.

=== 1980s ===
Larry Coryell and John McLaughlin took part on the making of Paco de Lucía's Castro Marín (1981). Recorded at Tokyo in December 1980, Castro Marín remains one of the most obscure titles in his catalogue. Coryell and Paco played as duo on the fifth track, "Convite (Rumba)", and as a trio on the next track "Palenque".

Coryell's alcoholism and drug abuse eventually cost him his spot on The Guitar Trio, in the early 1980s. Of his struggles in that period, he said:

By the late 70s. I had gotten successful; [...]. I did some big tours, did some television... People magazine stories, and all that horseshit. I got arrogant. The grandiosity set in. I forgot how I had gotten there. I had forgotten about the hard work, that struggle. I got lazy. But I would later come to realize that what I had to do was go back and do all that work again - practice constantly, listen to other people's music, study other people's phrasing, work on learning new tunes and old standards, work on horn lines and piano lines, practice scales. My slogan became G.O.Y.A. (Get Off Your Ass). I had to work like a madman, especially when I didn't want to work. And it took a lot of humility. It was the beginning of the end of arrogance.

When Coryell overcame his self-exile and his bout with alcoholism, he took on his most challenging project yet: solo versions of three Igor Stravinsky ballets: L'oiseau de feu, Petrouchka (1982) and Le sacre du printemps (1983).

Coryell prepared for three months for recording Le sacre du printemps. He became so "obsessed" by it that he got hand sores and blisters hands from over-rehearsing his parts. Three weeks before the recording sessions Coryell got cold feet, calling producer Teo Macero to say he was quitting the project. Macero convinced him otherwise, and he finally recorded the whole piece on March 21, 1983, on the vernal equinox. In the end he was proud of it, a "milestone" in his life. "It's like, if you can tackle Stravinsky, you can tackle anything," he said on an interview to DownBeat.

One year later, Coryell collaborated with award-winning classical guitarist Kazuhito Yamashita on a guitar duo rendition of Antonio Vivaldi's The Four Seasons, a Japan-only release. "All I remember about this record is how amazingly this young Japanese guitarist played", Coryell wrote on his autobiography. He also said he had "fun" playing the "music of Vivaldi, of all people." The concert was also released on LaserDisc.

In 1985, Coryell recorded Together with fellow guitarist Emily Remler, who died in 1990.

=== 2000s ===
Since 2008, Coryell toured in a duo with fusion guitarist Roman Miroshnichenko.

=== 2010s ===
Starting in 2010, Coryell toured with a trio that included pianist John Colianni.

== Artistry ==
=== Inspiration ===
Coryell’s speaks about his first encounter with Indian raga music, when he first heard a Ravi Shankar record in 1962. What struck him immediately was the way the strings were bent, something that resonated with what he had already absorbed from musicians like Chuck Berry. Beyond that, he was drawn to the sustained drone and the depth of expression in the music, which made him feel an immediate sense of affinity with it. Coryell attributes his sense of connection with Indian music to shared folk origins. He heard strong traces of the blues in raga: the plaintive quality, the twang, and even a kind of vocalized gasp or cry that gives the music its emotional weight.

== Personal life ==
Coryell was first married to writer-actress Julie Nathanson (1947–2009), daughter of actress Carol Bruce. She appeared on the covers of several of his albums (including Lady Coryell, Larry Coryell at the Village Gate and The Lion and the Ram) and later wrote the book Jazz-Rock Fusion, which was based on interviews with many of Coryell's peers, including Chick Corea and John McLaughlin. She also sang intermittently with Coryell, including one track on the 1984 album Comin' Home. The couple had two sons (Murali Coryell (b. 1969) and Julian Coryell (b. 1973), both professional guitarists, before divorcing in 1985. Thereafter, he had a brief romance with fellow jazz guitarist and artistic collaborator Emily Remler.

In 1988, Coryell remarried, to Connecticut native Mary Schuler; they divorced in 2005. Two years later, he married his last wife, Tracey Lynn Piergross, in Orlando, Florida, where he resided until his death in 2017.

After overcoming his alcohol and heroin addictions in 1981, Coryell began practicing Nichiren Buddhism. In November 2016, Coryell condemned Donald Trump following his election to the presidency of the United States. "This is an unacceptable situation", he said to Bill Milkowski of DownBeat.

We cannot let all the work we've done as jazz musicians to help relationships between people … we can't let all that go to hell. And that's what this election is going to do. It'll take us back to the Dark Ages and people will think that it's OK to be prejudiced again. Well, I don't accept it. We have to stand up. … [Trump is] an impostor, a huckster, and he's got to go. And because I'm a Buddhist I'm going to chant about it and try to turn poison into medicine, and just get deeper and deeper into my music.

Shortly after these comments were published, Coryell wrote to Downbeat to apologize and retract:

I am no longer angry about the election; I accept it. I have musician friends who did not vote my way. I have no place implying, as I did in the article, that their votes were insincere or illegitimate... Also—and this is very important—I believe that I have a responsibility to transcend politics, focusing instead on finding ways to touch people's hearts through music. I never want to forget all the great players who mentored me in the art of demonstrating restraint regarding hot-button issues; these men and women advised me to exercise discretion, and to behave with exemplary humanity. ...My comments did nothing to further the cause of our music. I apologize.

== Death ==
Coryell died of heart failure on February 19, 2017, in a New York City hotel room at the age of 73. He had performed at the Iridium Jazz Club in Manhattan on the preceding two days.

Coryell's last opera, based on Leo Tolstoy's novel Anna Karenina, was presented at the 2017 World of Guitar opening, featuring the Moscow Symphony along with Roman Miroshnichenko, Serbian classical guitarist Nenad Stephanovich, and Slovenian opera soloists. The world premiere was dedicated to Coryell, the "godfather of fusion". The opera was completed by Miroshnichenko and Stephanovich after the death of Coryell.

== Discography ==
=== As leader/co-leader ===
- Lady Coryell (Vanguard Apostolic, 1969) – rec. 1968
- Coryell (Vanguard Apostolic, 1969)
- Spaces (Vanguard Apostolic, 1970)
- Barefoot Boy (Flying Dutchman, 1971)
- Fairyland (Mega, 1971) – live
- Larry Coryell at the Village Gate (Vanguard, 1971) – live
- Offering (Vanguard, 1972)
- The Real Great Escape (Vanguard, 1973)
- Introducing Eleventh House with Larry Coryell (Vanguard, 1974)
- Planet End (Vanguard, 1975)
- Level One (Arista, 1975)
- The Restful Mind (Vanguard, 1975)
- The Lion and the Ram (Arista, 1976)
- Basics (Vanguard, 1976)
- Aspects (Arista, 1976)
- Back Together Again with Alphonse Mouzon (Atlantic, 1977)
- Two for the Road with Steve Khan (Arista, 1977)
- Twin House with Philip Catherine (Elektra, 1977)
- At Montreux with Eleventh House (Vanguard, 1978)
- European Impressions (Arista Novus, 1978)
- Better Than Live with the Brubeck Brothers (Direct-Disk Labs, 1978)
- Standing Ovation: Solo (Mood, 1978)
- Difference (Egg, 1978)
- Splendid with Philip Catherine (Elektra, 1978)
- Return (Vanguard, 1979)
- Tributaries with John Scofield, Joe Beck (Arista Novus, 1979)
- Live! with Philip Catherine, Joachim Kühn, (Elektra, 1980)
- Boléro (String, 1981)
- The Larry Coryell/Michael Urbaniak Duo (Keytone, 1982)
- Scheherazade (Philips, 1982)
- L'Oiseau de Feu, Petrouchka (Philips, 1983)
- Le Sacre Du Printemps (Philips, 1983)
- Facts of Life with Michał Urbaniak (SWS, 1983)
- Just Like Being Born with Brian Keane (Flying Fish, 1984)
- A Quiet Day in Spring with Michał Urbaniak (Steeplechase, 1984)
- Comin' Home (Muse, 1984)
- Together with Emily Remler (Concord Jazz, 1985)
- Equipoise (Muse, 1986)
- Dedicated to Bill Evans and Scott La Faro with Miroslav Vitous (Jazzpoint, 1987)
- Toku Do (Muse, 1988)
- Air Dancing (Jazzpoint, 1988)
- Dragon Gate (Shanachie, 1989)
- Visions in Blue: Coryell Plays Ravel & Gershwin (Little Major, 1989)
- Shining Hour (Muse, 1989)
- American Odyssey (DRG, 1990)
- Don Lanphere/Larry Coryell (Hep, 1990)
- Twelve Frets to One Octave (Shanachie, 1991)
- Live from Bahia (CTI, 1992)
- Fallen Angel (CTI, 1993)
- I'll Be Over You (CTI, 1995)
- Sketches of Coryell (Shanachie, 1996)
- Spaces Revisited (Shanachie, 1997)
- Private Concert (Acoutic Music Records, 1998)
- Cause and Effect with Steve Smith, Tom Coster, (Tone Center, 1998)
- Monk, Trane, Miles & Me (HighNote, 1999)
- From the Ashes with L. Subramaniam (Water Lily Acoustics, 1999)
- New High (HighNote, 2000)
- The Coryells (Chesky, 2000)
- The Power Trio Live in Chicago (Highnote, 2001)
- Moonlight Whispers (Pastels, 2001)
- Count's Jam Band Reunion with Steve Marcus, Steve Smith, Kai Eckhardt (Tone Center, 2001)
- Inner Urge (HighNote, 2001)
- Cedars of Avalon (HighNote, 2002)
- Three Guitars with Badi Assad, John Abercrombie (Chesky, 2003)
- Tricycles (In+Out, 2003)
- The Four Seasons with Kazuhito Yamashita (BMG, 2004)
- Electric with Victor Bailey, Lenny White (Chesky, 2005)
- Traffic with Victor Bailey, Lenny White (Chesky, 2006)
- Laid Back & Blues (Rhombus, 2006)
- Impressions: The New York Sessions (Chesky, 2008)
- Earthquake at the Avalon (In-Akustik, 2009)
- Larry Coryell with the Wide Hive Players (Wide Hive, 2011)
- Montgomery (Patuxent Music, 2011)
- Duality with Kenny Drew Jr. (Random Act, 2011)
- The Lift (Wide Hive, 2013)
- Heavy Feel (Wide Hive, 2015)
- Barefoot Man: Sanpaku (Purple Pyramid, 2016)
- Seven Secrets with Eleventh House (Savoy, 2016)
- Last Swing with Ireland (Angel Air, 2021)
- Live at the Sugar Club (Angel Air, 2022)

=== As a member ===
The Free Spirits

- Out of Sight and Sound (ABC, 1967) – rec. 1966
- Live at the Scene February 22nd 1967 (Sunbeam, 2011) – live

Fuse One

- Fuse One (CTI, 1980)
- Ice (Electric Bird, 1984)

=== As sideman ===
With Gary Burton

- Duster (RCA Victor, 1967)
- Lofty Fake Anagram (RCA Victor, 1967)
- A Genuine Tong Funeral (RCAVictor, 1968) – rec. 1967
- Gary Burton Quartet in Concert (RCA Victor, 1968) – live

With Paco de Lucia

- Castro Marín (Philips, 1981)
- Entre Dos Aguas (Philips, 1983)

With Teo Macero

- Impressions of Charles Mingus (Palo Alto, 1983)
- Acoustical Suspension (Doctor Jazz, 1985)

With Leslie Mándoki

- Children of Hope (Gong, 1986)
- Out of Key... with the Time (Sony, 2002)

With Herbie Mann

- Memphis Underground (Atlantic, 1969)
- Memphis Two-Step (Embryo, 1971)
- Mellow (Atlantic, 1981)

With Steve Marcus

- Tomorrow Never Knows (Vortex, 1968)
- Count's Rock Band (Vortex, 1969)

With Charles Mingus

- Three or Four Shades of Blues (Atlantic, 1977)
- Me Myself An Eye (Atlantic, 1979)
- Something Like a Bird (Atlantic, 1980)

With Don Sebesky

- Don Sebesky & the Jazz Rock Syndrome (Verve, 1968)
- The Distant Galaxy (Verve, 1968)
- I Remember Bill (RCA Victor, 1998)

With L. Subramaniam

- Blossom (Crusaders, 1981)
- Spanish Wave (Milestone, 1983)
- Mani & Co. (Milestone, 1986)

With Michal Urbaniak

- Fusion III (CBS, 1975)
- Miles of Blue (Sony, 2009)

With Kazumi Watanabe

- Dogatana (Better Days, 1981)
- One for All (Polydor Japan, 1999)

With others

- The 5th Dimension, Earthbound (ABC, 1975)
- Laurindo Almeida, Sharon Isbin, 3 Guitars 3 (Pro Arte, 1985)
- Jon Anderson, 1000 Hands: Chapter One (Opio Media, 2019)
- Chet Baker, Chet Baker / Wolfgang Lackerschmid (Sandra, 1980)
- Bob Baldwin, Cool Breeze (Shanachie, 1997)
- Randy Brecker, Score (Solid State, 1969)
- Charlie Byrd, Herb Ellis, Mundell Lowe, The Return of the Great Guitars (Concord Jazz, 1996)
- Royce Campbell, Six by Six (Paddle Wheel/King, 1994)
- Ron Carter, In Memory of Jim (Somethin' Else, 2014)
- Billy Cobham, By Design (Fnac Music, 1992)
- Tom Collier, Across the Bridge (Origin, 2015)
- Wolfgang Dauner, Knirsch (MPS, 1972)
- Joey DeFrancesco, Wonderful! Wonderful! (HighNote, 2012)
- Al Di Meola, Super Guitar Trio and Friends (TDK, 2001)
- Roman Miroshnichenko, Surreal (7Jazz, 2013)
- Tim Eyermann, Now & Then (Living Tree, 1998)
- Tal Farlow, All Strings Attached (Verve, 1987)
- Ricky Ford, Future's Gold (Muse, 1983)
- David Garfield, Jazz Outside the Box (Creatchy, 2018)
- Art Garfunkel, Up 'til Now (Columbia, 1993)
- Stu Goldberg, Solos-Duos-Trios (MPS, 1978)
- Stephane Grappelli, Young Django (MPS, 1979)
- Stefan Grossman, Friends Forever Guitar Collaborations (Stefan Grossman's Guitar Workshop, 2008)
- Chico Hamilton, The Dealer (Impulse!, 1965)
- Roland Hanna, Gershwin Carmichael Cats (CTI, 1982)
- Donald Harrison, The Power of Cool (CTI, 1991)
- Jazz Composer's Orchestra, The Jazz Composer's Orchestra (JCOA, 1968)
- Fumio Karashima, Round Midnight (Full House, 1983)
- Ithamara Koorax, Ithamara Koorax Sings the Luiz Bonfa Songbook (Paddle Wheel, 1996)
- Bireli Lagrene, & Special Guests (In-Akustik, 1986)
- Arnie Lawrence, Look Toward a Dream (Project 3, 1968)
- Michael Mantler, Movies (WATT Works, 1978)
- John McLaughlin, Paco de Lucia, Meeting of the Spirits (Alpha Centauri, 1982)
- Bob Moses, Love Animal (Amulet, 2003)
- Alphonse Mouzon, The Sky Is the Limit (Tenacious, 1996)
- Mark Murphy, September Ballads (Milestone, 1988)
- Chico O'Farrill, Nine Flags (Impulse!, 1966)
- Anca Parghel, Jazz, My Secret Soul (Intercont Music, 1994)
- Jim Pepper, Pepper's Pow Wow (Embryo, 1971)
- Sonny Rollins, Don't Ask (Milestone, 1979)
- Sigi Schwab, Solo's Duo's and Trio's (Keytone, 1982)
- Steve Smith, The Best of Steve Smith (ToneCenter, 2009)
- Brian Tarquin, Orlando in Heaven (Purple Pyramid, 2017)
- Dylan Taylor, One in Mind (Blujazz, 2017)
- Leon Thomas, Blues and the Soulful Truth (Flying Dutchman, 1973)
- Bob Thompson, Wilderness (Intima, 1989)
- Eddie Cleanhead Vinson, You Can't Make Love Alone (Mega/Flying Dutchman, 1971)
- Jack Walrath, Out of the Tradition (Muse, 1992)
- Jimmy Webb, And So: On (Reprise, 1971)
- Lenny White, Venusian Summer (Nemperor, 1975)
- Larry Young, Spaceball (Arista, 1976)

== Videography ==
- L. Subramaniam Violin From the Heart (1999) – directed by Jean Henri Meunier (includes a scene of Coryell performing with L. Subramaniam)
- Meeting of the Spirits /1979 (2003) – live performance in London featuring Coryell, John McLaughlin, and Paco de Lucia
- Super Guitar Trio and Friends in Concert /1990 (2005) – live performance featuring Coryell, Al Di Meola, and Biréli Lagrène
- Super Guitar Trio: Live in Montreux /1989 (2007) – live performance featuring Coryell, Al Di Meola, and Biréli Lagrène
- Three Guitars: Paris Concert /2004 (2012) – live performance featuring Coryell, Badi Assad, and John Abercrombie

== Bibliography ==
- Barth, Joe (2006). Voices in Jazz Guitar. Pacific, Missouri: Mel Bay. ISBN 0786676795.
- Coryell, Julie; Friedman, Laura (1978). Jazz-rock fusion: the people, the music. USA: Dell Publishing Co., Inc. ISBN 0-440-54409-2.
- Coryell, Larry (January 30, 1975). "Larry Coryell speaks on modern electric ecleticism". DownBeat. Vol. 42, no. 2. Chicago, IL. pp. 18, 36. ISSN 0012-5768.
- Coryell, Larry (September 1975). "Larry Coryell reminisces". Guitar Player. Vol. 9, no. 9. Saratoga, CA. ISSN 0017-5463.
- Coryell, Larry (2007). Improvising: My Life in Music. Hal Leonard Corporation. ISBN 978-0879308261.
- Denyer, Ralph (April 1975). "Larry Coryell". Guitar. Vol. 3, no. 9. London. pp. 18–22.
- Hoefer, George (June 29, 1967). "Larry Coryell - Now!". DownBeat. Vol. 34, no. 13. Chicago, IL. pp. 17–19. ISSN 0012-5768.
- "Larry Coryell's European impressions". International Musician and Recording World. Vol. 1, no. 7. New York, NY. July 1979. pp. 28–29, 31. ISSN 0307-1472.
- Milkowski, Bill (May 1984). "Larry Coryell: back to the roots". DownBeat. Vol. 51, no. 5. Chicago, IL. ISSN 0012-5768.
- Ness, Bob (May 9, 1974). "Have You Dug... Larry Coryell". DownBeat. Vol. 41, no. 9. Chicago, IL. p. 16. ISSN 0012-5768.
- Tesser, Neil (February 26, 1976). "Larry Coryell: leveling off". DownBeat. Vol. 43, no. 4. Chicago, IL. p. 12. ISSN 0012-5768.
