= Windows (composition) =

1966 Chick Corea jazz standard

Song
- Written: 1966
- Genre: Jazz
- Composer(s): Chick Corea

"Windows" is a jazz composition in 3/4 time by Chick Corea. It has become a jazz standard, and is among the earliest of Corea's compositions to have achieved this status.

== Background ==
Corea first recorded "Windows" under the title "Uph" on a session led by Mercer Ellington on January 5, 1966. This session was later published on the compilation album Duke Ellington - New Mood Indigo. Joining Corea were Paul Gonsalves, Aaron Bell, and Louis Bellson, all sideman of the Duke Ellington Orchestra.

In August 1966, "Windows" was recorded for the Hubert Laws album Laws' Cause, featuring Corea on piano, and issued in 1969. The same track would later appear on the 1973 compilation album Inner Space. In March 1967, Corea recorded the piece as part of Stan Getz's band, with the results included on the album Sweet Rain. ("Windows" also appears on the Getz album Live At Montreux 1972, again with Corea on piano.)

A year later, in 1968 Corea recorded "Windows" under his own name, accompanied by bassist Miroslav Vitouš and drummer Roy Haynes; this version would appear on the 1975 album Circling In as well as the 1988 CD release of Now He Sings, Now He Sobs. A 1997 performance, featuring Corea, vibraphonist Gary Burton, guitarist Pat Metheny, bassist Dave Holland, and Haynes, is included on the album Like Minds. "Windows" would later appear on the 2006 Corea album Super Trio (Live at the One World Theatre, April 3rd, 2005).

== Other recordings ==
- Hubert Laws – Carnegie Hall (CTI 1973)
- Lee Konitz and Hal Galper – Windows (SteepleChase, 1976)
- Joe Pass – Virtuoso No. 2 (Pablo, 1976)
- Flora Purim – Encounter (Milestone, 1977)
- Groove Holmes – Shippin' Out (Muse, 1978)
- Marian McPartland – At the Festival (Concord, 1979)
- Mike Stern – Standards (and Other Songs) (Atlantic, 1992)
- Bobby McFerrin – Beyond Words (Blue Note, 2002)
- Eldar Djangirov – Three Stories (Sony Masterworks, 2011)
