= Tones for Joan's Bones =

Studio album by Chick Corea
- Released: April 20, 1968
- Recorded: November 30 & December 1, 1966
- Studio: Atlantic Studios, New York City
- Genre: Jazz
- Length: 39:54
- Label: Atlantic/Vortex
- Producer: Herbie Mann

Chick Corea chronology
Tones for Joan's Bones (1968)	Now He Sings, Now He Sobs (1968)

Tones for Joan's Bones is the debut album by American jazz pianist Chick Corea, recorded in 1966 and released on Vortex Records—a subsidiary of Atlantic—in April 1968. The quintet features saxophonist Joe Farrell, trumpeter Woody Shaw, and rhythm section Steve Swallow and Joe Chambers.

Corea had previously recorded with Mongo Santamaria, Sonny Stitt, Dave Pike, Hubert Laws, Blue Mitchell and Cal Tjader. This was the first Corea album to feature Joe Farrell, who would go on to record with Corea many times, including in the first and last lineups of Return to Forever. Farrell and Woody Shaw had played with Corea in Willie Bobo's band, and Shaw would record with Corea again on the 1969 album Is. Tones for Joan's Bones was produced by flautist Herbie Mann, with whom Corea had recorded four albums the previous year.

"Litha" was later recorded by Stan Getz, appearing on the 1967 album Sweet Rain, with Corea on piano. "Tones for Joan's Bones" and "Straight Up and Down" were both recorded by Blue Mitchell for his album Boss Horn, which features Corea, and which was recorded several weeks before Corea's album. "Straight Up and Down" later appeared as the closing track of Like Minds in 1998, which features Corea, Gary Burton, Pat Metheny, Dave Holland and Roy Haynes. In 2011, the Jazz at Lincoln Center Orchestra included "Tones for Joan's Bones" in its first Chick Corea retrospective concert.

The album has been re-issued on CD paired with the Miroslav Vitouš album Mountain in the Clouds (a.k.a. Infinite Search, a.k.a. The Bass, 1970). The four tracks from Tones for Joan's Bones, along with two previously unreleased tracks from the same session, were released on the 1973 compilation Inner Space.

== Reception ==
Professional ratings
Review scores
Source	Rating
AllMusic	4.5/5 stars
The Penguin Guide to Jazz Recordings	4/4 stars
DownBeat	4.5/5 stars

In a 1968 review for DownBeat, Harvey Pekar awarded the album 4.5 stars, and commented: "Here's a real sleeper. Corea and his sidemen are not among the most well-known performers in jazz, but they've cut a splendid record." The authors of The Penguin Guide to Jazz awarded the album 4 stars, and stated: "Given that he had already been playing for 20 years, there is no reason to regard Tones as the work of a prodigy... he felt under no particular pressure to record as a leader, and approached the first session... with a very relaxed attitude. That is evident in every track. The title-piece is a jazz classic and the opening 'Litha' deserves to be better known."

Jim Todd, writing for AllMusic, awarded the album 4.5 stars, calling it "a blazing, advanced hard bop set" and stating: "Anybody with an interest in this vital and exciting period will find this session indispensable." John Fordham included Tones for Joan's Bones in his list of Corea's 10 greatest recordings, and commented: "the 25-year-old reflected the soulfully punchy hard bop jazz style that the rock-dominated 60s were already displacing. But since he was partnered here by such savvy experts in the method as trumpeter Woody Shaw, saxophonist Joe Farrell and bassist Steve Swallow, and he was unveiling his signature fusion of direct, songlike lyricism and driving swing with a side order of formal classical elegance, it was a memorable entrance just the same."

== Track listing ==
Side one
No.	Title	Writer(s)	Length
1.	"Litha"	Chick Corea	13:33
2.	"This is New"	Kurt Weill, Ira Gershwin	7:37

Side two
No.	Title	Writer(s)	Length
1.	"Tones for Joan's Bones"	Chick Corea	6:11
2.	"Straight Up and Down"	Chick Corea	12:33

== Personnel ==
- Chick Corea – piano
- Woody Shaw – trumpet (tracks 1–2, 4)
- Joe Farrell – tenor saxophone, flute (tracks 1–2, 4)
- Steve Swallow – double bass
- Joe Chambers – drums
