= Dedicated to Bill Evans and Scott LaFaro =

Studio album by Larry Coryell and Miroslav Vitouš
- Released: 1987
- Recorded: May 13th, 1987
- Studio: Calren Studios, Germany
- Genre: Jazz
- Length: 45:14
- Label: Jazzpoint Records
- Producer: Larry Coryell; Miroslav Vitouš

Larry Coryell chronology
Equipoise (1986)	Dedicated to Bill Evans and Scott LaFaro (1987)	Toku Do (1987)

Miroslav Vitouš chronology
Emergence (1985)	Dedicated to Bill Evans and Scott LaFaro (1987)	Atmos (1992)

Dedicated to Bill Evans and Scott LaFaro is an album by the American guitarist Larry Coryell and the Czech bass player Miroslav Vitouš, which was released by Jazzpoint Records in 1987.

The album is credited to the "Larry Coryell/Miroslav Vitouš Quartet", which is explained in the liner notes that it includes the two musicians who provided the inspiration; pianist Bill Evans and bass player, Scott LaFaro.

== Track listing ==
1. "Some Day My Prince Will Come" (Larry Morey, Frank Churchill) – 4:56
2. "Nardis" (Miles Davis) – 3:37
3. "Solar" (Miles Davis) – 4:18
4. "Some Other Time" (Leonard Bernstein, Betty Comden, Adolph Green) – 5:17
5. "Corcovado" (Antônio Carlos Jobim) – 4:46
6. "Autumn Leaves" (Joseph Kosma, Jacques Prévert) – 5:32
7. "My Romance" (Richard Rodgers, Lorenz Hart) – 5:33
8. "Stella By Starlight" (Victor Young, Ned Washington) – 6:52
9. "The Peacocks" (Jimmy Rowles) – 6:23

== Personnel ==
- Larry Coryell – guitar
- Miroslav Vitouš – bass
