= Geisse =

Geisse is a surname. Notable people with the surname include:

- Eduardo Figueroa Geisse (1916–2000), Chilean engineer, economist, businessman
- Gunnar Geisse (born 1962), German musician
- John Geisse (1920–1992), American businessman
- Manuel Aguirre Geisse (1909–2001), Chilean politician
