= Sweet Rain =

Studio album by Stan Getz
- Released: Last week of July 1967
- Recorded: March 21 and 30, 1967
- Studio: Van Gelder, Englewood Cliffs, New Jersey
- Genre: Jazz
- Length: 37:29
- Label: Verve; V6-8693
- Producer: Creed Taylor

Stan Getz chronology
Voices (1966)	Sweet Rain (1967)	What the World Needs Now: Stan Getz Plays Burt Bacharach and Hal David (1968)

Sweet Rain is a jazz album by Stan Getz, released on the Verve record label in 1967. It features the tenor saxophonist in a quartet setting with Chick Corea, who was just 25 at the time, on piano; Ron Carter on bass; and Grady Tate on drums.

== Background ==
In December 1966, vibraphonist Gary Burton left Getz's quartet. Getz decided to return to a lineup including a piano and selected the upcoming pianist and composer Chick Corea, who had previously performed with Mongo Santamaría and Herbie Mann, among others, for the spot. Getz then began incorporating Corea's advanced conceptions of harmony and meter into the group's sound, which are fully on display in Sweet Rain. Along with other jazz albums recorded in 1967—such as Miles Davis's Sorcerer and Nefertiti and Wayne Shorter's Schizophrenia—Sweet Rain reflected "the loosening of form which had followed the introduction of modal improvisation."

Corea later said that his early time with Getz "taught me a lot of much-appreciated discipline. ... It was very much a learning experience." During that time, though, Getz was still struggling with substance abuse and bouts of unpredictable and sometimes violent behavior. Corea soon had his fill of it and left Getz to join Burton's quartet with Steve Swallow and Roy Haynes, both of whom were also Getz alumni. Corea and Burton would go on to have a long and fruitful partnership, producing such classic albums as Crystal Silence. Getz and Corea would eventually team up again for the fusion album Captain Marvel, recorded in 1972 but not released until 1975.

== Repertoire ==
Sweet Rain is bookended by two Corea originals, "Litha" and "Windows". Corea had first recorded both of them the previous year, the former on his debut album, Tones for Joan's Bones, and the latter with Mercer Ellington under the title "Uph" and then with Hubert Laws for the album Laws' Cause, which wasn't released until 1969. Corea subsequently recorded "Windows" a number of other times. The title track, by Michael Gibbs, "become a standard after Getz's tender treatment here". The program is rounded out with performances of "O Grande Amor" by Antônio Carlos Jobim, with whom Getz had collaborated on his most famous album, Getz/Gilberto, and Dizzy Gillespie's "Con Alma". Jazz critic Ted Gioia called this an "excellent recording" of the Gillespie jazz standard, with "the contrasting and evolving rhythmic conceptions of the different members of the band. ... Getz thrives in this labyrinth, delivering a poised, fluid solo."

== Reissues ==
Verve Records originally released the album on compact disc in 1983. A remastered version in digipak format appeared in 2008. Both CD editions feature only the original five tracks from the 1967 LP.

== Reception ==
The AllMusic review by Steve Huey states that Sweet Rain is "one of Stan Getz's all-time greatest albums" and that it's "his first major artistic coup after he closed the book on his bossa nova period, featuring an adventurous young group that pushed him to new heights in his solo statements." Huey also writes, "The neat trick of Sweet Rain is that the advanced rhythm section work remains balanced with Getz's customary loveliness and lyricism. Indeed, Getz plays with a searching, aching passion throughout the date .... Technical perfectionists will hear a few squeaks on the LP's second half (Getz's drug problems were reputedly affecting his articulation somewhat), but Getz was such a master of mood, tone, and pacing that his ideas and emotions are communicated far too clearly to nit-pick. Corea's spare, understated work leaves plenty of room for Getz's lines and the busily shifting rhythms of the bass and drums, heard to best effect in Corea's challenging opener 'Litha.'" Huey concludes, "The quartet's level of musicianship remains high on every selection, and the marvelously consistent atmosphere the album evokes places it among Getz's very best. A surefire classic."

Gioia, in his History of Jazz, calls the album "a major musical statement", on which Corea was already "a mature piano stylist and composer", with "a clean, sharply articulated piano sound, a mix of modal and impressionist harmonies, and a driving on-top-of-the-beat rhythmic feel".

Steve Wyzard's retrospective review for Jazz Music Archives says, "Sweet Rain would do nothing less than epitomize Stan's 'sound' for the rest of his career: smaller ensembles, unassuming formats, and the wistful, ethereal tones that only he could produce. ... [E]veryone is given ample soloing space, with Stan soaring above it all."

Professional ratings
Review scores
Source	Rating
AllMusic	5/5 stars
The Penguin Guide to Jazz Recordings	3.5/4 stars

== Track listing ==
1. "Litha" (Chick Corea) – 8:30
2. "O Grande Amor" (Antônio Carlos Jobim, Vinicius de Moraes) – 4:44
3. "Sweet Rain" (Mike Gibbs) – 7:12
4. "Con Alma" (Dizzy Gillespie) – 8:06
5. "Windows" (Corea) – 8:57

Recorded on March 21 (Tracks 1–3) and March 30 (Tracks 4–5), 1967.

== Personnel ==
=== Musicians ===
- Stan Getz – tenor saxophone
- Chick Corea – piano
- Ron Carter – bass
- Grady Tate – drums

=== Additional personnel ===
- Producer – Creed Taylor
- Engineer – Rudy Van Gelder
- Cover photograph – Tom Zimmerman
- Director of engineering – Val Valentin
- Original liner notes – Johnny Magnus

== Charts ==
Chart performance for Paradise State of Mind
Chart (1967)	Peak position
US Top LPs (Billboard)	195
US Jazz LPs (Billboard)	5

Chart (2024)	Peak position
Croatian International Albums (HDU)	20
