= Perger =

Perger is a surname, which is an older version of "Berger". The first letter did not change from "P" to "B", which was common in the late Middle Ages. The word "Perg" or later "Berg" means mountain, so the name describes someone, who lived on a mountain. Mostly that persons were related to the government, or they were the governor of their region one millennium ago. Someone in this position was the lord of the mountain. In old German language that would be the "Herr vom Perg" or the "Pergherr", which is the origin of "Perger". The name comes quite likely from the German-speaking part of the Alps, which is Austria (with its languages Burgenland Croatian, Slovene, Hungarian, Czech, Slovak, and Romani), Germany (Bavaria and Baden-Wuerttemberg), South Tyrol in Italy (with its languages German, Italian, and Ladin), and Switzerland (with its languages German, French, Italian, and Romansh), but it could be originated everywhere in the German language area, where a hill or a mountain was populated. In comparison to the name "Berger" it is rather rare. A similar even rarer name with the same meaning is "Pergher" or "Bergher", still displaying the "h". The reason for the varying spellings is the development of the German language in different regions of the German language area and its regions of language transitions in the last thousand years.

- Andreas Paolo Perger (born 1970), Austrian/ German/ Italian contemporary guitarist, improviser, and composer
- Denis Perger (born 1993), Slovenian footballer
