= Feio =

Feio may refer to:

- Feio River, a river of Paraná state in southern Brazil
- Moto Grosso Feio, an album by Wayne Shorter recorded on April 3, 1970
- Gonçalo Feio, a Portuguese football coach
- Renato Feio, a Brazilian herpetologist
