= Odyssey of Iska =

Studio album by Wayne Shorter
- Released: July 1971
- Recorded: August 26, 1970
- Studio: A&R Studios, New York City
- Genre: Avant-garde jazz
- Length: 39:27
- Label: Blue Note; BST 84363
- Producer: Duke Pearson

Wayne Shorter chronology
Super Nova (1969)	Odyssey of Iska (1971)	Second Genesis (1974)

Odyssey of Iska is the fourteenth studio album by American jazz composer and saxophonist Wayne Shorter, released on Blue Note Records in 1971. Musicians include guitarist Gene Bertoncini, bassists Ron Carter and Cecil McBee and drummer Billy Hart, along with multiple percussionists.

== History and concept ==
Odyssey of Iska was the outcome of the second recording session with Shorter that was produced by Duke Pearson. (The first session, Moto Grosso Feio on April 3, 1970, was not issued until 1974.) With the exception of Ron Carter there was a completely different line-up, although with a similar instrumentation: Shorter's saxophone as the only horn, guitar instead of keyboards, two double bass players, and various percussion instruments including marimba and vibraphone. The same emphasis on percussion is also found on a recording date led by Joe Zawinul only some two weeks before, on August 10, where Wayne Shorter had a guest appearance on "Double Image" (released on Zawinul).

Wayne Shorter had just married Ana Maria Patricio, whom he had met four years earlier. The name "Iska" in the album title refers to their daughter. She was born around the time the record was made.

One of the percussionists on Odyssey of Iska, Frank Cuomo, is the father of rock group Weezer's frontman, Rivers Cuomo. The other drummers are Billy Hart and Alphonse Mouzon.

== Reception ==
Professional ratings
Review scores
Source	Rating
All About Jazz	(quite favourable)
AllMusic	3/5 stars

The AllMusic review by Scott Yanow states: "On the verge of joining Weather Report (referred to in the liner notes as "Weather Forecast"), it is not surprising that Shorter's originals include titles such as "Wind", "Storm", and "Calm". These moody works were never covered by other jazz players but they work quite well in this context, launching melancholy flights by Shorter."

== Track listing ==
All compositions by Wayne Shorter except where noted.

1. "Wind" – 8:00
2. "Storm" – 8:22
3. "Calm" – 3:25
4. "Depois do Amor, o Vazio" (After Love, Emptiness) (Bobby Thomas) – 11:40
5. "Joy" – 9:00

== Personnel ==
- Wayne Shorter – tenor saxophone, soprano saxophone
- Gene Bertoncini – guitar
- Ron Carter, Cecil McBee – bass
- Billy Hart, Alphonse Mouzon – drums
- Frank Cuomo – drums, percussion
- David Friedman – vibraphone, marimba
