= Virtue (Eldar Djangirov album) =

Studio album by Eldar Djangirov
- Released: 2009
- Genre: Jazz
- Label: Sony Masterworks

Eldar Djangirov chronology
Re-Imagination (2007)	Virtue (2009)	Three Stories (2011)

Virtue is a jazz album released in 2009 by new Sony Masterworks. It is the fourth album by the Kyrgyzstan-born, New York-based musician Eldar Djangirov.

The album was released when Djangirov was 22 years old. In the album, pianist Djangirov worked with bassist Armando Gola and drummer Ludwig Afonso. Djangirov was also aided and abetted by guests saxophonist Joshua Redman, saxophonist Felipe Lamoglia, and trumpeter Nicholas Payton. There are ten original compositions among which eight were written or co-written by Djangirov. Djangirov commented, "In many ways, you could think of it as a soundtrack to my direct experiences since I've moved to New York City."

== Background ==
Throughout the album, "Exposition" starts with a bing-bang sound, and it follows with a call and response between piano and sax, featuring the energy and frenzy of urban bustle. Djangirov adds some electric piano under Redman’s solo, then follows the reprise of the melody with a ripping and echo-effected synthesizer solo. A similar pattern is shown on "Blues Sketch in Clave", but with Felipe Lamoglia on tenor sax. In "Insensitive", the trio becomes gentler, Djangirov’s Chopinesque piano introduction shifting to a more abstract journey, with rapid-fire lyricism.

In "Estate", swinging support from bassist Armando Gola and drummer Ludwig Afonso provide a strong jazz sensibility and balance out Djangirov's tendency at times to move more towards a classical style of playing. "Estate" is a slow and delicate piece which allows Djangirov to show his emotions; there is absence of complex chord patterns. "Iris", is another delicate ballad which showcases Djangirov’s strengths by combining classical melody with the jazz feelings. Electric bassist Armando Gola seeps through the melody to add delicate lines, and the piece is closed with delicate solo piano. In "Blackjack", Djangirov properly solos first, but he gives most impressive setting to trumpeter Peyton, who solos against a spare but funky background. When the melody returns, however, there is synth again. Throughout Virtue, Djangirov manages to avoid clichés.

From the start, Djangirov took an experimental approach to this project. He said, "I came up with intricate frameworks but allowed it to expand in a rhapsodic way," he explains. "That means I didn't limit myself. I didn't write with any idea of form, like A-A-B-A. Instead, I set my goals and priorities, priorities by experimenting with harmonic movements, melodic ideas, and rhythmic codes. Through this, I was able to shape and develop these ideas which eventually became the basis for the compositions for this album." After laying the compositional foundation of Virtue, Djangirov brought Gola and Afonso into the mix because their musical priorities were similar to those of Djangirov. Equally important, they established an intuitive communication that was critical to transforming those ideas into compelling performances. Eventually they reached a point where, as Djangirov puts it, "we all feel like we know where this train is going. We listen constantly to each other as we play. If somebody goes in an unexpected direction, we don't go against him; we move and breathe together. We rely on each other. It comes from following our impulses rather than 'reading' this note at that exact time."
