= Adam Pierończyk =

Polish jazz saxophonist and composer (born 1970)

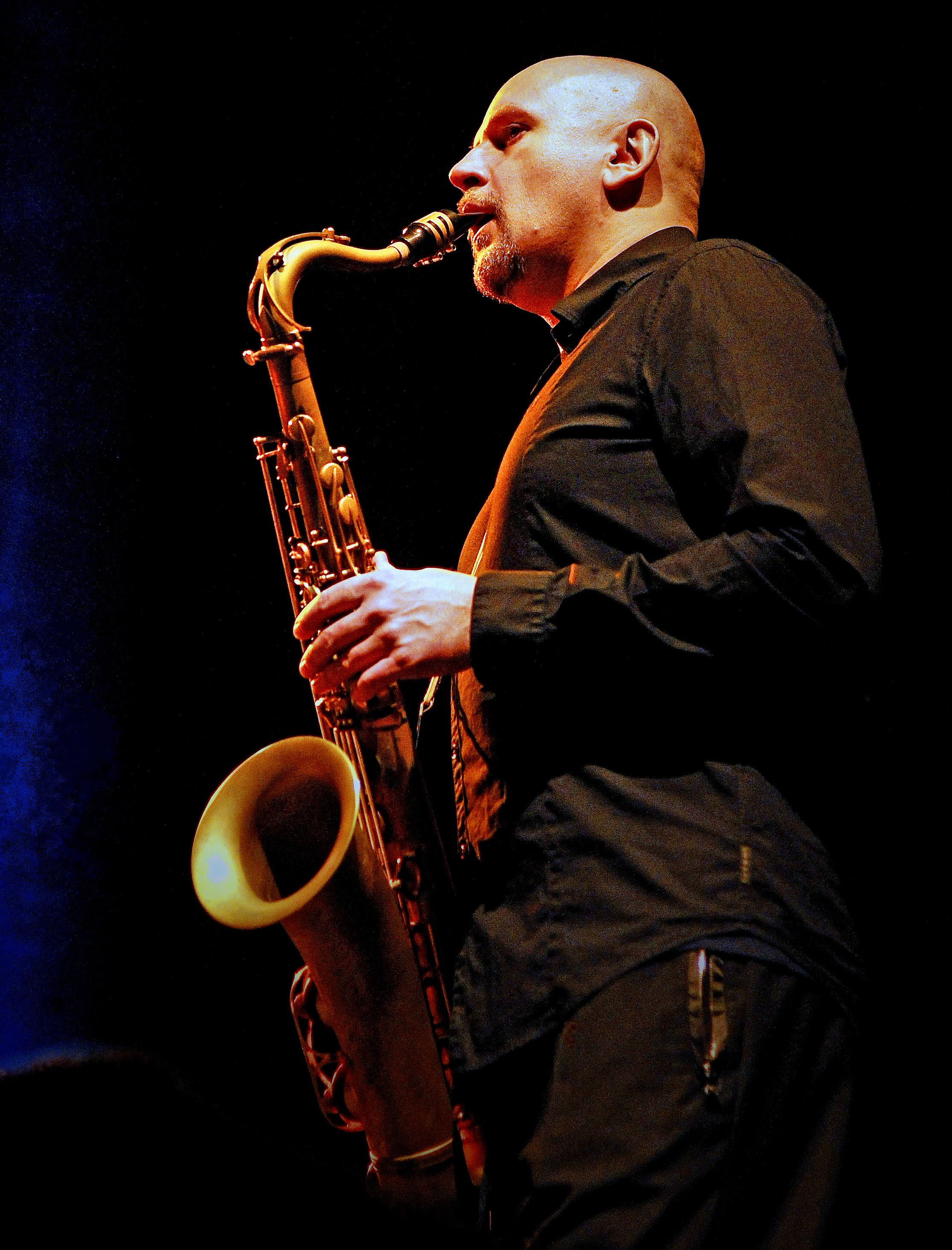
Pierończyk in 2011

Adam Pierończyk (born 24 January 1970) is a Polish jazz saxophonist and composer. He plays tenor and soprano saxophones, as well as the zoucra.

== Early life ==
Pierończyk was born in Elbląg, Poland, on 24 January 1970. He learned the piano for three years from the age of eight, and later switched to saxophone. After moving with his parents to Germany, he "enrolled in the jazz department at the Higher Music School".

== Later life and career ==
Pierończyk has won awards from the Polish magazine Jazz Forum: New Hope of Polish Jazz in 1997, and the readers' choice as Best Soprano Saxophonist in 2003 and 2004. His tribute to pianist/composer Krzysztof Komeda, Komeda: The Innocent Sorcerer, was released in 2010. His Adam Pierończyk Quartet, from around the same time, was based on saxophone and trombone, without chordal instruments.

== Playing style ==
The Jazz Book by Joachim-Ernst Berendt describes Pierończyk as an "emotionally enormously powerful stylist [...] whose playing is deeply founded in the great black tenor [saxophone] tradition". His playing on Adam Pierończyk Quartet was described by a New York City Jazz Record reviewer as: "folk-futurist along the lines of Ornette Coleman, [...with] nursery-rhyme melodies that seem to change key every few bars, stringing together fragmented phrases".

== Discography ==
As leader/co-leader

Title / co-leader	Recorded	Label	Released	Notes
Temathe - Water Conversations	1995–10	TEMATHE / Germany	1996–01	In Saarbrücken, Germany with Jan Oestreich, Christian Fischer
Anniversary Concert for Hestia	1996–06	DUX & Hestia / Poland	1996–08	Duet with Leszek Możdżer. Live.
Few Minutes in the Space	1997–02	GOWI Records / Poland (CDG 43)	1997–05	In Kraków, Poland. Trio with Adam Kowalewski, Jacek Olter, Zbigniew Namyslowski
Live in Sofia /with Leszek Możdżer	1998?	NOT TWO / Poland (MW 701-2)	1998–05	Live in Sofia, Bulgaria
Plastinated Black Sheep	1999–03	NOT TWO & HiFi / Poland (MW 710-2)	1999–06	with Ed Schuler, Jacek Kochan
19-9-1999 /with Leszek Możdżer	1999–09	Polish Institute in Kyiv & J.R.C. Jazz / Ukraine	2000–04	In Ukraine
Adam Pierończyk Digivoco /feat. Gary Thomas	2000–11	PAO Records / Austria (PAO 10230)	2001–06	in Freiling, Austria /with Gary Thomas, Gunnar Geisse, Maurice de Martin, Tadeusz Sunday
Plastiline Black Sheep as Plastiline Black Sheep	2001–05	Meta Records / Germany (Meta 012)	2001–09	In Berlin with Johannes Fink, Maurice de Martin
Amusos	2002–09	PAO Records / Austria (PAO 10900)	2003–10	In Berlin with Mina Agossi, Henning Sieverts, Adam Kowalewski, Tadeusz Sudnik, Daniel Schroeteler
Busem Po São Paulo	2005–07	META Records / Germany	2006–05	In São Paulo, Brazil. Trio with Krzysztof Dziedzic, Robert Kubiszyn, Guello, Anna Serafinska.
Live in Berlin	2005–11	META Records / Germany	2007–01	Live in Berlin. Trio with Ed Schuller, Krzysztof Dziedzic.
Live at A38	2007–07	SP Records, Poland (SPDVD 01/08)	2008–08	[DVD-Video] Live in Budapest, Hungary. Trio with Andrzej Swies, Krzysztof Dziedzic.
El Buscador	2008–01	JazzWerkstatt Berlin / Germany (JW 064)	2010–01	In Gdansk, Poland. Quartet with Adrian Mears, Anthony Cox, Krzysztof Dziedzic.
A-Trane Nights	2008–01	For Tune / Poland (0040(028))	2014–10	Live in Berlin, Germany. Quartet with Adrian Mears, Anthony Cox, Krzysztof Dziedzic.
Komeda – The Innocent Sorcerer	2009–11	JazzWerkstatt Berlin /Germany (JW 104)	2010–11	In Warsaw, Poland with Gary Thomas, Nelson Veras, Anthony Cox, Lukasz Zyta
Gajcy Szyc Pierończyk /with Borys Szyc	2009–12	Muzeum Powstania Warszawskiego	2010–03	Poetry by Tadeusz Gajcy. In Niepolomice, Poland.
The Planet of Eternal Life	2013–06	JazzWerkstatt Berlin / Germany (JW 149)	2013–11	In Peitz, Germany. solo soprano saxophone album.
Migratory Poets /feat. Anthony Joseph	2014–11	For Tune / Poland (0061(039))	2015–04	In Katowice, Poland with Anthony Joseph, Nelson Veras, Robert Kubiszyn, John B. Arnold
Wings /with Miroslav Vitous	2015–08, 2015–09	For Tune / Poland (0084(054))	2015–11	In Gdansk, Poland
Monte Albán	2016–03	Jazz Sound / Poland (JS020 )	2016–10	In Mexico with Robert Kubiszyn, Hernan Hecht
Live at NOSPR /with Miroslav Vitous	2016–03	Jazz Sound / Poland (JS021)	2019–11	Live in Katowice, Poland
Ad-lib Orbits /with Miroslav Vitous	2016–07	PAO Records / Austria (PAO11320)	2017–06	In Prague, Czech Republic
