= Universal Syncopations II =

Studio album by Miroslav Vitouš
- Released: June 15, 2007
- Recorded: November 2004 – April 2005
- Studio: Universal Syncopation Studios, Italy
- Genre: Jazz
- Length: 50:32
- Label: ECM; ECM 2013
- Producer: Miroslav Vitouš

Miroslav Vitouš chronology
Universal Syncopations (2003)	Universal Syncopations II (2007)	Remembering Weather Report (2009)

Universal Syncopations II is an album by Czech bassist Miroslav Vitouš recorded between November 2004–April 2005 and released June 15, 2007 on ECM.

== Reception ==
Professional ratings
Review scores
Source	Rating
AllMusic	3.5/5 stars
The Penguin Guide to Jazz Recordings	3.5/4 stars

The AllMusic review by Alex Henderson states, "The interesting thing is that while Universal Syncopations 2 stresses ensemble playing and team work, parts of the album are quite free; this disc offers an inside/outside perspective, sometimes moving into mildly avant-garde territory but never favoring outright chaos. A quintessentially ECM aesthetic is very much at work on this solid effort, which will be enthusiastically welcomed by those who complain that Vitouš hasn't recorded often enough as a leader."

== Track listing ==
All tracks composed, arranged, and directed by Miroslav Vitouš

No.	Title	Length
1.	"Opera"	11:16
2.	"Breakthrough"	5:32
3.	"The Prayer"	7:06
4.	"Solar Giant"	4:42
5.	"Mediterranean Love"	5:09
6.	"Gmoong"	6:13
7.	"Universal Evolution"	9:04
8.	"Moment"	2:58

== Personnel ==
=== Musicians ===
- Miroslav Vitouš – bass, meditation bowl (track 8)
- Gary Campbell (tracks 1, 2, 4, 5) – soprano saxophone
- Bob Mintzer (tracks 1, 6), Gary Campbell (tracks 3, 7), Bob Malach (track 8) – tenor saxophone
- Bob Malach (track 8) – tenor saxophone
- Bob Mintzer (tracks 1, 6 & 7) – bass clarinet
- Randy Brecker – trumpet (tracks 1 & 6)
- Daniele di Bonaventura – bandoneon (track 5)
- Gerald Cleaver (except 1, 6 & 8), Adam Nussbaum (track 1) – drums
- Vesna Vaško-Cáceres – voice (track 8)
- Unnamed choir and orchestra

=== Technical personnel ===
- Miroslav Vitouš – producer, recording
- Andrea Luciano – assistant mixing engineer
- Sascha Kleis – design
- Robert Zlatohlávek, Tomáš Vodňanský – photography
