= StAR (album) =

Studio album by Jan Garbarek
- Released: October 1991
- Recorded: January 1991
- Studio: Rainbow Studios; Oslo, Norway
- Genre: Jazz
- Length: 41:58
- Label: ECM; ECM 1444
- Producer: Manfred Eicher

Jan Garbarek chronology
Ragas and Sagas (1990)	StAR (1991)	Atmos (1993)

Miroslav Vitouš chronology
Trio Music Live in Europe (1986)	StAR (1991)	Atmos (1991)

Peter Erskine chronology
Aurora (1988)	StAR (1991)	Sweet Soul (1991)

StAR is an album by Norwegian saxophonist Jan Garbarek recorded in January 1991 and released on the ECM October later that year. The trio features Miroslav Vitouš—who wrote most of the album—and Peter Erskine.

== Reception ==
The AllMusic review by Rick Anderson awarded the album 4 stars and states "The tunes may be somewhat interchangeable, but the music is virtuosic, thoughtful and thoroughly lovely, at times heart-tugging. Makes you wish these three would get together more often"

Professional ratings
Review scores
Source	Rating
AllMusic	4/5 stars
The Penguin Guide to Jazz Recordings	3.5/4 stars

== Track listing ==
All compositions by Miroslav Vitouš except as indicated

1. "Star" (Jan Garbarek) – 6:15
2. "Jumper" – 4:21
3. "Lamenting" – 6:08
4. "Anthem" (Peter Erskine) – 6:16
5. "Roses for You" – 5:39
6. "Clouds in the Mountain" – 4:38
7. "Snowman" (Erskine, Garbarek, Vitouš) – 5:21
8. "The Music of My People" (Erskine) – 3:42

== Personnel ==
- Jan Garbarek – soprano saxophone, tenor saxophone
- Miroslav Vitouš – bass
- Peter Erskine – drums
