= Journey's End (album) =

Studio album by Miroslav Vitouš
- Released: 1983
- Recorded: July 1982
- Studio: Talent Studio; Oslo, Norway
- Genre: Jazz
- Length: 40:09
- Label: ECM 1242
- Producer: Manfred Eicher

Miroslav Vitouš chronology
| Trio Music (1982) | Journey's End (1983) | Emergence (1986) |

Journey's End is an album by Czech bassist Miroslav Vitouš recorded in July 1982 and released on ECM the following year. The quartet features reed player John Surman, pianist John Taylor, and drummer Jon Christensen.

== Reception ==
The AllMusic review by David R. Adler awarded the album 4 stars stating "Journey's End is highly recommended to those willing to search for it."

Professional ratings
Review scores
| Source | Rating |
|---|---|
| AllMusic | 4/5 stars |
| The Penguin Guide to Jazz Recordings | 4/4 stars |

== Track listing ==
All compositions by Miroslav Vitouš except as indicated

1. "U Dunaje U Prešpurka" - 9:18
2. "Tess" (John Surman) - 5:56
3. "Carry On, No. 1" (Surman, John Taylor, Jon Christensen, Vitouš) - 5:08
4. "Paragraph Jay" (Surman) - 6:16
5. "Only One" - 7:14
6. "Windfall" (Taylor) - 6:17

== Personnel ==
- Miroslav Vitouš – double bass
- John Surman – soprano saxophone, baritone saxophone, bass clarinet
- John Taylor – piano
- Jon Christensen – drums
