= Winter Sun Crying =

Live album by William Parker & the ICI Ensemble
- Released: January 12, 2011
- Recorded: December 20, 2009 at Muffathalle, Munich
- Genre: Jazz
- Length: 62:49
- Label: NEOS Jazz; NEOS 41008

William Parker chronology
I Plan to Stay a Believer (2001-2008)	Winter Sun Crying (2011)	Uncle Joe's Spirit House (2010)

Winter Sun Crying is a live album by American jazz bassist William Parker with the German ICI Ensemble which was recorded as part of their Composer in Dialogue series in 2009 and released on the NEOS Jazz label.

== Reception ==
Professional ratings
Review scores
Source	Rating
AllMusic	4/5 stars

In his review for AllMusic, arwulf arwulf states "Winter Sun Crying may be enjoyed among the freest of William Parker's many imaginatively conceived and fully liberated recordings".

== Track listing ==
All compositions by William Parker & the ICI Ensemble

1. "Bells" - 8:10
2. "Train" - 2:59
3. "Winter Sun Crying" - 4:24
4. "Earth" - 3:12
5. "Moon" - 5:04
6. "Orphans" - 4:37
7. "Explosion" - 2:48
8. "Tears" - 3:03
9. "Hope" - 2:36
10. "Sky" - 3:14
11. "Grandmother" - 2:12
12. "Circle" - 4:00
13. "Hello" - 3:02
14. "Revolution" - 6:56
15. "Let's Change The World" - 6:39

== Personnel ==
- William Parker - bass, piccolo trumpet, shakuhachi, double reeds
- David Jäger - soprano saxophone, tenor saxophone
- Roger Jannotta - alto saxophone, piccolo, flute, clarinet
- Markus Heinze - baritone saxophone, tenor saxophone
- Christofer Varner - trombone, sampler
- Johanna Varner - cello
- Martin Wolfrum - piano, keyboard
- Gunnar Geisse - laptop, laptop guitar
- Georg Janker - double bass, G2
- Sunk Pöschl - drums
