= Uncle Joe's Spirit House =

Album by William Parker

Studio album by William Parker Organ Quartet
- Released: 2010
- Recorded: January 22, 2010; The Gallery Recording Studio, Brooklyn, NY
- Genre: Jazz
- Length: 64:30
- Labels: Centering; CENT1004
- Producer: William Parker

William Parker chronology
Winter Sun Crying (2009)	Uncle Joe's Spirit House (2010)	Tender Exploration (2010)

Uncle Joe's Spirit House is an album by American jazz double bassist William Parker, which was recorded in 2010 and released on the Centering label.

== Reception ==
Professional ratings
Review scores
Source	Rating
AllMusic	4.5/5 stars

In his review for AllMusic, arwulf arwulf states "Bassist William Parker's exceptionally fine and friendly-to-listen-to album Uncle Joe's Spirit House has been warmly received as a comparatively "inside" listening experience, because unlike virtually anything else in his discography prior to its release in 2010, this is a study in organ combo jazz... with every recording he sends out into the world, William Parker's personal blend of spirituality, surreality, and musicality references every aspect of his—and our—existence" The All About Jazz review noted "Uncle Joe's Spirit House is a deeply personal offering from a musician whose role as a scene leader and social activist is as significant as his instrumental prowess".

== Track listing ==
All compositions by William Parker

1. "Uncle Joe's Spirit House" - 9:01
2. "Jacques' Groove" - 2:13
3. "Ennio's Tag" - 5:41
4. "Document for LJ" - 10:44
5. "Let's Go Down to the River" - 7:19
6. "Buddha's Joy" - 8:47
7. "The Struggle" - 8:46
8. "Theme for the Tasters" - 7:47
9. "Oasis" - 4:12

== Personnel ==
- William Parker - bass
- Darryl Foster - tenor saxophone
- Cooper-Moore - organ
- Gerald Cleaver - drums
