= Now He Sings, Now He Sobs =

Studio album by Chick Corea
- Released: December 1968
- Recorded: March 14, 19 and 27, 1968
- Studio: A&R Studios, New York City
- Genre: Jazz, post-bop, free jazz
- Length: 40:24 Original LP; 68:48 CD reissue
- Label: Solid State; SR 3157; Blue Note; 1988 CD reissue {CDP 7 90055 2}
- Producer: Sonny Lester

Chick Corea chronology
Tones for Joan's Bones (1968)	Now He Sings, Now He Sobs (1968)	Is (1969)

Now He Sings, Now He Sobs is the second studio album by Chick Corea, released in December 1968 on Solid State Records. It features Corea in a trio with bassist Miroslav Vitouš and drummer Roy Haynes. In 1988 it was reissued on CD by Blue Note with eight bonus tracks recorded at the same sessions.

All of the tracks on the original album are improvisations based on Corea’s ideas, with some being entirely free improvisations (such as "The Law of Falling and Catching Up" and "Fragments"). Vitous and Haynes would reunite with Corea as an acoustic trio on Trio Music (ECM, 1982), Trio Music, Live in Europe (ECM, 1986), and The Trio Live From The Country Club (Stretch, 1996). The trio also backed saxophonist Toshiyuki Honda on the album Dream (Eastworld, 1983).

The bonus tracks released on the CD include a cover of Thelonious Monk's composition "Pannonica" and the Wood/Mellin standard "My One and Only Love". All eight pieces had originally been issued in 1975 on Circling In, a Blue Note “twofer”.

According to Corea, the album title comes from the I Ching, which contains a section called "Now He Sings; Now He Sobs — Now He Beats The Drum; Now He Stops." He recalled: "The poetry of that phrase fit the message of the trio's music... the gamut of life experiences — the whole human picture and range of emotions."

== Reception ==
Professional ratings
Review scores
Source	Rating
AllMusic	4.5/5 stars
MusicHound Jazz	5/5 stars
The Penguin Guide to Jazz Recordings	4/4 stars
The Rolling Stone Jazz Record Guide	4/5 stars

DownBeat's reviewer awarded the original release zero stars, refusing to assign a rating because he didn't know what to think of it.

In 1999, the single "Now He Sings, Now He Sobs" was given the Grammy Hall of Fame Award.

In a review for AllMusic, Stephen Thomas Erlewine described the album as "the place where [Corea] put all the pieces in motion for his long, adventurous career," and wrote: "There's an intellectual rigor balanced by an instinctual hunger that makes for music that's lively and challenging while also containing a patina of comfort... it captures the pianist at the brink: it's kinetic, exciting, and filled with endless possibilities."

The authors of The Penguin Guide to Jazz Recordings awarded the album a full 4 stars, calling it "a fine, solid jazz set with some intelligently handled standard material."

The editors of MusicHound Jazz awarded the album a full 5 stars, and writer Ralph Burnett noted that it "features Corea's best original writing and a superb trio."

Will Layman of PopMatters included the recording in his article "The 11 Best Chick Corea Albums," and stated: "Can an artist sum up their career in what was essentially a debut? Yes." On a similar note, The Guardian's John Fordham included the album in his list of Corea's "10 Greatest Recordings," noting that it "found him at a crossroads, pulled between the swing of the classic acoustic jazz-piano trio and the more free-associative future he would soon briefly explore," and praising his "powerful and intuitive partners," who "follow his every move."

Author and drummer Michael Stephans called the album "a piano trio classic," and commented: "Many musicians and listeners alike believe it to be one of the greatest modern jazz trio records ever made. Corea is in top form, and Haynes and Vitous are responsive, supportive, and daring in their accompaniment and solos."

Writer and historian Loren Schoenberg remarked: "it is refreshing to go back to this... to hear how original his style sounded bounding out of the context of the 1960s... Corea's compositions and free-flowing concept set him apart from the pack even at this early date."

The singer Bilal named it among his 25 favorite albums, explaining: "I think that's just one of the best jazz trio albums ever. Mostly every jazz musician I talk to love that album. It's just a classic."

== Track listing ==
All tracks are originals by the performers, except where noted.

Original release

1. "Steps - What Was" – 13:53
2. "Matrix" – 6:29
3. "Now He Sings, Now He Sobs" – 7:05
4. "Now He Beats the Drum, Now He Stops" – 10:40
5. "The Law of Falling and Catching Up" – 2:28

1988 CD release

1. "Matrix" – 6:25
2. "My One and Only Love" (Guy Wood, Robert Mellin) – 3:35
3. "Now He Beats the Drum, Now He Stops" – 10:34
4. "Bossa" – 4:41
5. "Now He Sings, Now He Sobs" – 7:05
6. "Steps - What Was" – 13:49
7. "Fragments" – 4:02
8. "Windows" – 3:09
9. "Pannonica" (Thelonious Monk) – 2:58
10. "Samba Yantra" – 2:39
11. "I Don't Know" – 2:40
12. "The Law of Falling and Catching Up" – 2:25
13. "Gemini" – 4:21

== Personnel ==
- Chick Corea – piano
- Miroslav Vitouš – bass
- Roy Haynes – drums
- Sonny Lester – producer

== See also ==
- Trio Music (ECM, 1982)
- Trio Music Live in Europe (ECM, 1986)
