= Miroslav Vitous Group =

Miroslav Vitouš Group

Studio album by the Miroslav Vitouš Group
- Released: February 1981
- Recorded: July 1980
- Studio: Talent Studio; Oslo, Norway
- Genre: Jazz
- Length: 47:07
- Label: ECM 1185
- Producer: Manfred Eicher

Miroslav Vitouš chronology
First Meeting (1980)	Miroslav Vitouš Group (1981)	Trio Music (1982)

Miroslav Vitouš Group is an album by the Miroslav Vitouš Group recorded in July 1980 and released on ECM in 1981. The quartet features saxophonist John Surman, pianist Kenny Kirkland, and drummer Jon Christensen.

== Reception ==
A contemporaneous review published in the Jazz Journal described Miroslav Vitous Group as "a fine recording of great melodic strength and variety". Though critiquing aspects of Kirland and Surman's performances, the review concluded that Vitous had "at last produced a heavyweight recording, worthy of the talent that has always lurked in the electronic thickets".

More recent reappraisals of Miroslav Vitous Group have reflected the original critical consensus, with the AllAboutJazz critic, John Kelman, concluding that it was "good too — exceptionally good, in fact". However, writing for AllMusic, Thom Jurek was more critical, describing Miroslav Vitous Group as "more a record of extended moments than consistently engaging pieces".

Professional ratings
Review scores
Source	Rating
AllMusic	3/5 stars
The Rolling Stone Jazz Record Guide	3/5 stars
AllAboutJazz	5/5 stars

== Track listing ==
All compositions by Miroslav Vitouš except as indicated

1. "When Face Gets Pale" - 5:46
2. "Second Meeting" (Jon Christensen, Kenny Kirkland, John Surman, Vitouš) - 4:52
3. "Number Six" (Surman) - 5:50
4. "Inner Peace" (Kirkland) - 7:21
5. "Interplay" (Christensen, Kirkland, Surman, Vitouš) - 9:56
6. "Gears" - 6:29
7. "Sleeping Beauty" (Christensen, Kirkland, Surman, Vitouš) - 4:59
8. "Eagle" - 1:54

== Personnel ==
=== Miroslav Vitouš Group ===
- John Surman – soprano saxophone, baritone saxophone, bass clarinet
- Kenny Kirkland – piano
- Miroslav Vitouš – double bass
- Jon Christensen – drums
