= Second Genesis (album) =

Studio album by Wayne Shorter
- Released: May 1974
- Recorded: October 11, 1960
- Studio: Universal Recorders, Chicago
- Genre: Hard bop
- Length: 35:07 original LP
- Label: Vee-Jay; VJS 3057
- Producer: Sid McCoy

Wayne Shorter chronology
| Odyssey of Iska (1971) | Second Genesis (1974) | Moto Grosso Feio (1974) |

Professional ratings
Review scores
| Source | Rating |
|---|---|
| AllMusic | 4/5 stars |
| The Penguin Guide to Jazz Recordings | 3/4 stars |

Second Genesis is the second album by jazz saxophonist Wayne Shorter recorded by the Vee-Jay label in 1960 but not released until 1974. It was his second session as leader, performing with his Jazz Messengers boss Art Blakey on drums, pianist Cedar Walton and bassist Bob Cranshaw. Walton joined Blakey's Messengers the following year, following the departure of Bobby Timmons.

== Track listing ==
All compositions by Wayne Shorter except where noted.

1. "Ruby and the Pearl" (Ray Evans, Jay Livingston) – 5:53
2. "Pay as You Go" – 3:39
3. "Second Genesis" – 4:09
4. "Mr. Chairman" – 3:13
5. "Tenderfoot" – 3:24
6. "The Albatross" – 5:21
7. "Getting to Know You" (Oscar Hammerstein II, Richard Rodgers) – 4:16
8. "I Didn't Know What Time It Was" (Lorenz Hart, Richard Rodgers) – 5:12

Bonus tracks on some CD reissues

9. "Ruby and the Pearl" [Take 2] (Evans, Livingston) – 7:40
10. "Mr. Chairman" [Take 3] – 3:17
11. "Tenderfoot" [Take 1] – 2:50
12. "The Albatross" [Take 1] – 5:16
13. "Getting to Know You" [Take 1] (Hammerstein, Rodgers) – 4:34

== Personnel ==
- Wayne Shorter – tenor saxophone
- Cedar Walton – piano
- Bob Cranshaw – double-bass
- Art Blakey – drums
