= Trio Music =

Studio album by Chick Corea, Miroslav Vitous and Roy Haynes
- Released: October 4, 1982
- Recorded: November 1981
- Genre: Jazz
- Length: 74:52
- Label: ECM 1232/33
- Producer: Manfred Eicher

Chick Corea chronology
Three Quartets (1981)	Trio Music (1982)	Touchstone (1982)

Miroslav Vitouš chronology
Miroslav Vitous Group (1981)	Trio Music (1982)	Journey's End (1983)

Roy Haynes chronology
Vistalite (1979)	Trio Music (1982)	True or False (1986)

Trio Music is a double album by Chick Corea, recorded in November 1981 and released by ECM Records in October of the following year. The trio features bassist Miroslav Vitous and drummer Roy Haynes.

== Background ==
The album peaked at number seventeen on Billboard's Jazz Albums chart. The record is this trio’s successor to the 1968 classic Now He Sings, Now He Sobs and the precursor of their 1986 Trio Music, Live in Europe. The album was also issued as single CD edition.

== Reception ==
Professional ratings
Review scores
Source	Rating
AllMusic	4/5 stars
The Penguin Guide to Jazz Recordings	3/4 stars
The Rolling Stone Jazz Record Guide	4/5 stars
The Virgin Encyclopedia of Jazz	4/5 stars

In a review for AllMusic, Scott Yanow wrote: "The first half of this two-fer... is sometimes a touch lightweight even with moments of interest... However, the second album... comes across quite well as Corea does justice to the spirit of Monk without losing his own strong musical personality."

Peter Marsh of the BBC stated: "ECM has always brought out the best in Corea, with the label's tendency towards introspection stripping away most of the fussiness and bombast that makes some of his other recordings a bit hard to stomach. The trio setting is a sympathetic frame for Corea's pianistic talents for much the same reasons."

Writing for Between Sound and Space, Tyran Grillo commented: "Highly recommend for the lovely Monk set alone, but give the improvisations a chance, and you will surely find a wealth of colors to explore again and again."

== Track listing ==
Disc one: “Trio Improvisations”

1. "Trio Improvisation 1" (Chick Corea, Roy Haynes, Miroslav Vitouš) – 3:26
2. "Trio Improvisation 2" (Corea, Haynes, Vitouš) – 3:51
3. "Trio Improvisation 3" (Corea, Haynes, Vitouš) – 3:08
4. "Duet Improvisation 1" (Corea, Vitouš) – 4:26
5. "Duet Improvisation 2" (Corea, Vitouš) – 5:26
6. "Trio Improvisation 4" (Corea, Haynes, Vitouš) – 4:40
7. "Trio Improvisation 5" (Corea, Haynes, Vitouš) – 7:43
8. "Slippery When Wet" (Corea) – 6:01

Disc two: “The Music of Thelonious Monk”

1. "Rhythm-a-ning" (Thelonious Monk) – 5:06
2. "'Round Midnight" (Bernie Hanighen, Monk, Cootie Williams) – 5:15
3. "Eronel" (Monk) – 4:38
4. "Think of One" (Monk) – 4:28
5. "Little Rootie Tootie" (Monk) – 4:50
6. "Reflections" (Monk) – 6:47
7. "Hackensack" (Monk) – 6:13

== Personnel ==
- Chick Corea – piano
- Miroslav Vitouš – bass
- Roy Haynes – drums

=== Production ===
- Manfred Eicher – producer
- Martin Wieland – recording and mixing engineer

== Chart performance ==
Year	Chart	Position
1983	Billboard Jazz Albums	17
