= Super Nova (Wayne Shorter album) =

Studio album by Wayne Shorter
- Released: 1969
- Recorded: August 29 & September 2, 1969
- Studio: A&R, New York City
- Genre: Post-bop
- Length: 37:55
- Label: Blue Note; BST 84332
- Producer: Duke Pearson

Wayne Shorter chronology
Schizophrenia (1969)	Super Nova (1969)	Odyssey of Iska (1971)

Super Nova is the twelfth album by Wayne Shorter, recorded in 1969 and released on the Blue Note label. The album features five originals by Shorter and an arrangement of "Dindi" by Antônio Carlos Jobim. "Water Babies", "Capricorn" and "Sweet Pea" were originally recorded in 1967 during sessions with Miles Davis that would eventually be released in 1976 as the album Water Babies.

Keyboardist Chick Corea appears on drums rather than his typical role, and bassist Walter Booker plays acoustic guitar on “Dindi”.

== Reception ==
Professional ratings
Review scores
Source	Rating
AllMusic	4/5 stars
The Penguin Guide to Jazz Recordings	3/4 stars
The Philadelphia Inquirer	4/4 stars
The Rolling Stone Jazz Record Guide	5/5 stars

The AllMusic review by Scott Yanow stated: "The influence of Miles Davis' early fusion period is felt throughout the music but there is nothing derivative about the often-surprising results. As with Wayne Shorter's best albums, this set rewards repeated listenings.".

== Track listing ==
All compositions by Wayne Shorter except where noted.

1. "Supernova" – 4:52
2. "Swee-Pea" – 4:36
3. "Dindi" (Antônio Carlos Jobim) – 9:35
4. "Water Babies" – 4:53
5. "Capricorn" – 7:47
6. "More Than Human" – 6:12
- Recorded August 29 (1–2, 4–5) and September 2 (3 & 6), 1969.

== Personnel ==
- Wayne Shorter – soprano saxophone
- John McLaughlin – acoustic and electric guitar (tracks 1–2, 4–5)
- Sonny Sharrock – electric guitar
- Chick Corea – drums, vibes
- Miroslav Vitouš – bass
- Jack DeJohnette – drums, kalimba
- Airto Moreira – percussion
- Walter Booker – acoustic guitar (track 3)
- Maria Booker – vocals (track 3)
- Niels Jakobsen – claves
