= Trio Music, Live in Europe =

Live album by Chick Corea
- Released: October 1986
- Recorded: September 1984
- Venues: Willisau; Reutlingen Switzerland
- Genre: Jazz
- Length: 61:50
- Label: ECM 1310
- Producer: Manfred Eicher

Chick Corea chronology
Septet (1985)	Trio Music, Live in Europe (1986)	The Chick Corea Elektric Band (1986)

Miroslav Vitouš chronology
Emergence (1986)	Trio Music Live in Europe (1986)	StAR (1991)

Roy Haynes chronology
True or False (1986)	Trio Music Live in Europe (1986)	Encounters (1990)

Trio Music, Live in Europe is a live album by American jazz pianist Chick Corea recorded in Switzerland in September 1984 and released on ECM in October 1986. The trio features rhythm section Miroslav Vitouš and Roy Haynes.

== Reception ==
The AllMusic review by Michael G. Nastos awarded the album 4 stars stating "Close to perfect, undeniably strong, willful, and musical beyond compare, Trio Music, Live in Europe belongs in your collection, and is simply as good as modern progressive mainstream jazz gets."

Professional ratings
Review scores
Source	Rating
AllMusic	4/5 stars
The Penguin Guide to Jazz	2.5/4 stars

== Track listing ==
All compositions by Chick Corea except as indicated

1. "The Loop" - 6:29
2. "I Hear a Rhapsody" (Jack Baker, George Fragos, Dick Gasparre) - 6:40
3. "Summer Night / Night and Day" (Al Dubin, Harry Warren / Cole Porter) - 14:23
4. "Prelude No. 2 / Mock Up" (Alexander Scriabin / Corea) - 12:19
5. "Transformation" (Miroslav Vitouš) - 5:09
6. "Hittin' It" (Roy Haynes) - 5:19
7. "Mirovisions" (Vitouš) - 11:30

== Personnel ==
- Chick Corea – piano
- Miroslav Vitouš – bass
- Roy Haynes – drums

== See also ==
- Now He Sings, Now He Sobs (Solid State, 1968)
- Trio Music (ECM, 1982)
