= Andreas Paolo Perger =

Austrian musician

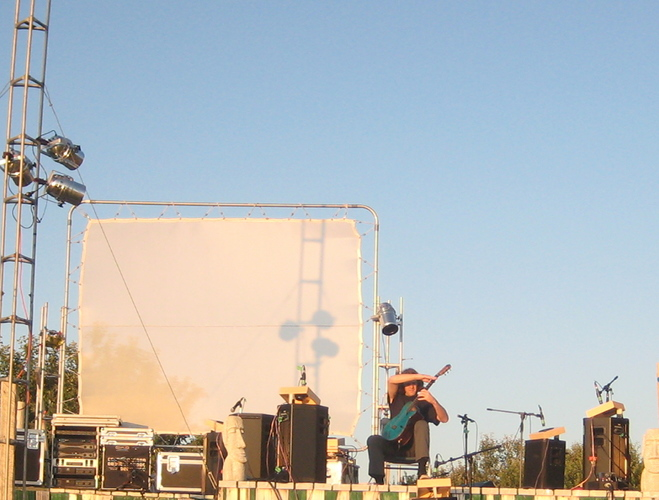
Andreas Paolo Perger playing "Concert for 5.1 surround guitar" at the 4th Electric Eclectics Festival, Canada 2009

Andreas Paolo Perger playing "Concert for 5.1 surround guitar" at the 4th Electric Eclectics Festival, Canada 2009. One movement, Duration: 39.14min, Help!

Andreas Paolo Perger (born 1970 in Munich, Germany) is a contemporary Austrian guitarist, improviser, and composer of German-Polish and Austrian-Italian descent. His music, autobiographical in nature, draws from variety of traditional and contemporary influences, such as contemporary jazz, new music, improvised music, and electronic music. Perger uses a variable and open concept of guitar playing, improvising, and composing. He plays the 5.1 Surround Guitar and the classical concert guitar.

== Musical style ==
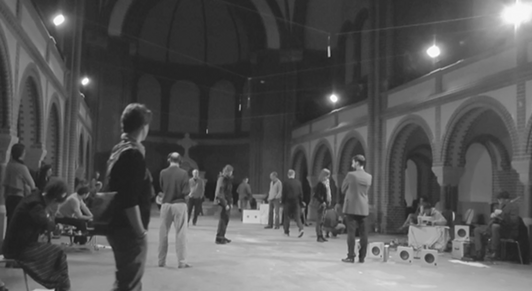
The audience walks through the spatially placed orchestra during the premiere of "Work for Orchestra 1" at St. Johannes-Evangelist Church, Berlin 2013.

His music balances narrative and abstract moments with their relationships to the composed and/or improvised overall texture. Some works are made of, or include, interactive and/or room-related elements (Cinema Series, Orchestra Series). Inspired by the spatial choral work of Johann Sebastian Bach at the St. Thomas Church, Leipzig and the spatial orchestral work Prometeo of Luigi Nono, he developed an extended instrument and an improvising and composing method for his multi-perspective spatial idea of guitar and ensemble music.

His playing style is adapted from classical guitar, using a classical right-hand technique to express complex harmonic structures and quick jazz-inspired melodic lines while sustaining impulsive strumming in the manner of the Spanish rasgueado, a typical colour in flamenco, and enhanced with playing techniques between tone and noise. He also uses hand symbols, the electronic sounds of the guitar amplifier, and various materials like wood, metal, and paper.

Perger's music ranges from pieces for classical or electric guitar, duo works for guitar and cello, string quartets, jazz rock trios and quartets, to room-related interactive group improvisations and compositions for video, electronics and guitar, based on lo-fi electronic sounds and found footage material, reflecting the guitar in a contemporary new media context. His composing technique emphasizes improvisation. He also works with modular playing, improvising, and composing concepts (Concert for 5.1 surround guitar, relief, gravure).

== Improvisation, composition, installation ==
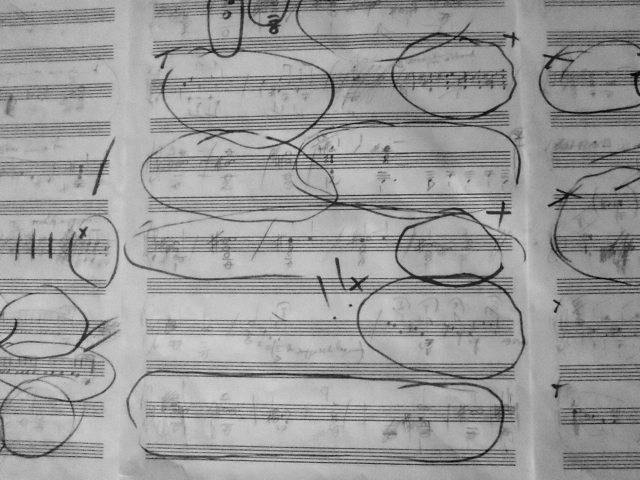
Sketches of chords and motives for improvised composition like "Concert for 5.1 concert guitar", "Relief", and "Gravur/ Gravure".

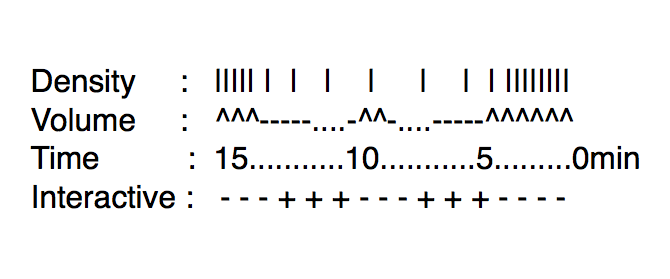
This sketch of the score for "Work for orchestra 1" shows how the improvised composition is structured with the playing instructions density, volume, time, and interactive.

The relation between improvisation and composition, adapted for guitar and ensembles is a main topic in the music of Perger.

Together with the relation between sound and its spatial and social context (installation, social sculpture), it forms the framework condition for the open and variable musical concept, aiming to integrate various subjective musical positions in consistent musical works combining focused musical imagination with open-process oriented thinking.

The two sketches at the side give an insight in tonal and structural organization of the improvised compositions. An interactive layer is already included in the score of the "Work for Orchestra 1". Process, realization, and documentation eventually form the complete finished work adding a relevant amount of intuition and not calculated spontaneity.

== 5.1 surround guitar, sound art ==
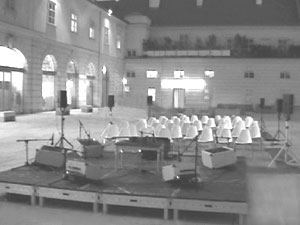
The picture shows the installation of "Concert for 5.1 surround guitar" at Tonspur_live, Vienna 2007.

Andreas Paolo Perger playing "Concert for 5.1 surround guitar" at Tonspur_live, Vienna 2007. One movement, Duration: 39.55min, Help!

His instrument, an electric concert guitar, is the result of several years of development in cooperation with Stevens Custom Guitars and Huber Amps. Though similar in size to a classical concert guitar, it is made to sound like a warm electric guitar, but with a broader spectrum of harmonics at higher frequencies. It also offers the option to create real 5.1 surround sound opening up the guitar towards sound art and installation emphasizing the spatial and sculptural aspects of sound.

It enables sending each of its six strings to one separate channel of an amplifier, and further to six separate loudspeakers in a room. It is played with finger technique on medium steel strings and sounds like an electric guitar. The instrument was built in 1998. It was presented at the Frankfurt Music Fair in 1999. The first radio live transmission (surround > stereo), and the first surround live concert took place in Munich in 2002. After several more years of technical and musical development, the Huber preamplification was added in 2007. Surround guitar concerts in Vienna 2007, Prague 2008, Munich, Hamburg, Münster, Lüneburg, Meaford, Ontario (Canada), and Berlin 2009, followed.

The solo guitar album Relief, recorded 2011 at "Studio am Fernsehturm" in Berlin, represents ten improvised compositions on the instrument in CD quality. The title refers to the acoustic relief arising while listening to the music with stereo headphones.

== Concert guitar, concert improvisation, composition ==
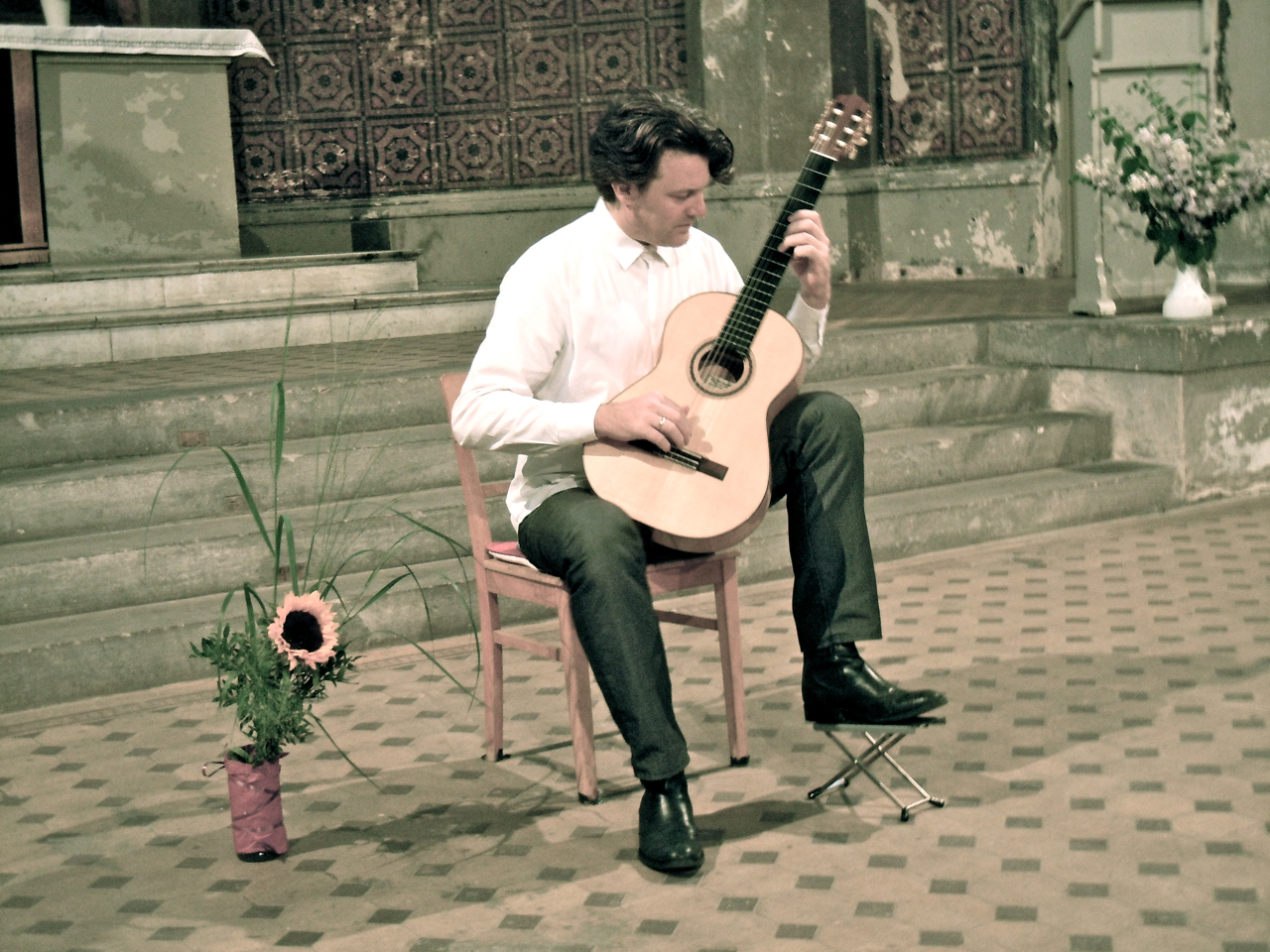
Andreas Paolo Perger playing "Gravur/Gravure" at Zionskirche Berlin, 2014-07-31.

Andreas Paolo Perger playing "Gravur/Gravure" at Zionskirche Berlin, 2014-08-21. Five movements, Duration: 43 minutes, Help!

The classical concert guitar has always fascinated Perger. Because of its specialization as a concert instrument for the interpretation of compositions, it is a challenge for concert improvisation. Beside his interpretations of classical music and his own compositions for concert guitar he continuously followed the idea of getting a more open and less categorized musical experience than usually associated with the traditional instrument. Therefore, he integrated improvisation into his music and playing technique of the interpretation-oriented instrument and developed a personal sound vocabulary. A last step in this process was the adaption of his module-based improvising and composing method completed on the 5.1 surround guitar.

"Gravure/Gravure", improvised compositions for concert guitar were performed regularly weekly at the "Zionskirche" Berlin from July 2014 until March 2019. The outstanding sound of the room from August Orth supported the interactive aspect of the music. During the concerts of several hours in length always new situationally inspired composition variants developed on the base of the over the time slowly changing source material. The compositions originated from the concert improvisations reflected the instrument in a pluralistic multilayered way and enfolded a wide dynamic and tonal pulse in the acoustics of the church. On 2017.08.10 the berlin daily newspaper B.Z. wrote in the category Classical: „The austrian concert guitarist Andreas Paolo Perger proves his great talent for improvisation.“ A concert-excerpt is to be heard in the movie "Beyond Words" by Urszula Antoniak. Ten of the compositions are published by the classical music publishing house Edition Margaux as sheet music. The concert series ended in a fire in which no one was injured.

== Groups and ensembles ==
The video shows Andreas Paolo Perger and the ICI Ensemble at Schwere Reiter, Munich 2008. Two movements, Duration: 22.56min, Help!

From 1993 to 1999 Perger played and recorded modern jazz orientated guitar music with his own groups, the Andreas Perger trio and quartet. CDs like Heart Pop and Ethnomorphocology arose. The late saxophonist Monty Waters was featured on the CD Happiness is a Warm Gun and joined the band a few times for live concerts. With the saxophonist Johannes Enders he played some duo concerts.

Starting from his work with the concert guitar, he played solo concerts with his improvisations and compositions for the electric guitar. In this context he played one of his compositions together with the "Leipziger Streichquartett" at the Bach Night at Zeche Zollverein in Essen, Germany, where he was invited to perform his solo pieces and improvisations. Another collaboration in this context took place with classical cellist Adrian Brendel. Concerts with contemporary improvisers such as Franz Hautzinger, Sebastiano Tramontana, Christofer Varner, the ICI Ensemble, and Tobias Delius followed.

== Works for Orchestra 1–3 ==
Premiere of the concert video "Andreas Paolo Perger – Work for Orchestra 1 – An interactive work genesis" by Carlos Bustamante, 2013

"Work for Orchestra 1 – An interactive work genesis" was premiered at St. Johannes-Evangelist-Church in Berlin in June 2013. The lineup consisted of Klaus Janek (db, e), Antonis Anissegos (e-p), Biliana Voutchkova (vl), Hilary Jeffery (trb), Alessandra Eramo (voc, e), Andreas Paolo Perger (e-gtr, c), Hannes Lingens (dr), Audrey Chen (vc, voc, e), Sabine Vogel (fl), Tobias Delius (ts), Roy Carroll (e), and Elena Kakaliagou (frh). The concert video was directed by Carlos Bustamante and premiered at the Arsenal Cinema Berlin in December 2013. It is the first work of a series of nine, that will be completed during the next years.

"Work for Orchestra 2 – An interactive work genesis" was premiered at St. Johannes-Evangelist-Church in Berlin in June 2015. The lineup consisted of Biliana Voutchkova (vl), Klaus Janek (db, e), Antonis Anissegos (e-p), Hilary Jeffery (trb), Michael Thieke (clar), Alessandra Eramo (voc, e), Andreas Paolo Perger (e-gtr, c), Yorgos Dimitriadis (dr), Audrey Chen (vc, voc, e), Sabine Vogel (fl), Gunnar Geisse (laptop-gtr), Elena Kakaliagou (frh), Almut Kühne (voc), Chris Dahlgren (viola da gamba), Katrin Mickiewicz (vla). The playing figures were made by Edouard Steinhauer. Alexander di Vasos drew the music during the concert. The concert video was directed by Carlos Bustamante.

"Work for Orchestra 3 – An interactive work genesis" was premiered on the 2017.05.26 at St. Elisabeth-Church in Berlin on the occasion of "36th German Evangelical Church Congress 2017". An expert jury awarded twenty-two works of known artists and musicians to be presented in the cultural program. The cultural newspaper "Zeig Dich" of the Kirchentag writes a.o. "The guitarist, improviser, and composer Andreas Paolo Perger mirrors the baroque union of interpretation, improvisation, and composition on contemporary forms. At the same time the recourse on duct and verve of the romantic brings contemporary sound-microscopy and sound-spontaneity in moving narrative correlations."

The lineup consisted of Andreas Paolo Perger (e-gtr, c), Alessandra Eramo (voc, e), Audrey Chen (vc, voc), Biliana Voutchkova (vl), Chris Dahlgren (viola da gamba), Elena Kakaliagou (frh), Emilio Gordoa (vib), Hilary Jeffery (trb), Matthias Bauer (db), Magda Mayas (p), Michael Thieke (clar), Mia Zabelka (e-vl), Paul Schwingenschlögl (tpt), Robin Hayward (tba), Roy Carroll (e), Sabine Vogel (fl). Works of the artists Jörg Laue, Antonio Panetta, and Bernd Aury were shown in the direct environment of the concert. The film recording for the concert video was directed by Carlos Bustamante. The sound recording by Christian Bader.

== Sound installation at Berlin Central Station (S15) ==
The opening of the new S15 line at Berlin Central Station also marked the launch of a site-specific sound installation with art video projections by Andreas Paolo Perger. The multi-channel sound system was realized according to his specifications. The sound installation is complemented daily from 3:00 p.m. by the large-scale video installation. The video art was also specifically designed to align with the architecture and overall design of the new S15 area. Together, sound and image create an audiovisual experience that shapes the atmosphere of the space and offers moments of reflection within the rhythm of everyday travel. If you would like to experience the sound and video art created for Berlin Central Station beyond your visit, you can also explore it online and take a part of the spatial experience with you on your journey.

== Biography ==
Born as Austrian in Munich, Andreas Paolo Perger grew up there and in Bolzano/Bozen. After receiving piano lessons at the age of three, he got classical guitar lessons from age seven and jazz guitar lessons from age eleven. Writing songs and forming bands was the only thing he did between age eleven and age seventeen. At a local music school, he learned classical guitar and electric guitar besides music theory and band workshops. He started to give guitar lessons, played in several bands and did solo performances with improvisations on the classical guitar.

From age twenty, he studied jazz guitar at the Berklee College, Boston. After that, he studied five years classical guitar with Prof. Barbara Probst-Polášek, master student of Andrés Segovia, at the Munich Conservatory. In these years he additionally studied jazz guitar on his own and went to master classes and lessons with John Scofield, John McLaughlin, Joe Pass, and Mike Stern. Probst-Polášek helped him adapt his jazz-related compositions to the instrument, encouraging him to write a concert for guitar and string quartet, which later was recorded as a studio project with the musicians of the Modern String Quartet. He also studied with Leo Brouwer during an improvisation master class at the Music Academy Marktoberdorf. The music for the CD Big City, a solo album with original compositions for the electric guitar, was written during a work in residence in New York in 1996. After its publishing in 1999 it was reviewed as "highly recommendable". Studies with Evan Parker, Frederic Rzewski and the late Wolfgang Stryi during an Ensemble Modern academy master class helped him to combine and balance improvisation and composition. Additionally he did free studies of video art and electronic music.

His experience with room-related compositions finally led to his form of contemporary guitar and guitar music, which is identified by bringing together the sound of the electric guitar and the diversity of timbres of the classical guitar, while using vintage electronic with its warm and dynamic sound of the vacuum tube to open up an additional spatial layer. His work could be described as rooted in tradition and inspired by contemporary musical concepts, which also gets obvious in his music for the classical concert guitar.

In 1997 he was awarded "Newcomer of the Year" of the German newspaper "Süddeutsche Zeitung". He also works as studio guitarist for cinema and television and did soundtracks for art-videos.

== Concerts ==
Andreas Paolo Perger performed his music in Germany, Austria, Italy, Switzerland, Czech Republic, Poland, and Canada at numerous venues and festivals for classical music, experimental music, contemporary jazz, and in the context of contemporary art and sound art. Performances of his music occurred a.o. at the Musicacademy Wroclaw, Poland, the Transart Bolzano, Italy, the Bach Night at Zeche Zollverein Essen, Germany, the Tonspur_live Vienna, the international festival "Jazz an der Donau", Germany, the 4th Electric Eclectics Festival, Canada, and the Institut Intermédií Praha/ Prague, Czech Republic.

== Discography ==
1. Relief (2011) Artist Edition
2. "Österreich oond dee Velt in 1938" Lindo Records (2008/ Sampler "Projekt 8")
3. Ethnomorphocology (2000) Fenn Music
4. Big City (1999) Fenn Music
5. Heart Pop (1999) Fenn Music
6. Standards (1998) Academica/ Fenn Music
7. Visions in Multitrack (1998) Academica/ Fenn Music
8. Liebe in den Zeiten der Cola/ Love in the age of cola (1998) Academica/ Fenn Music
9. Spielt Werke von/ Plays works of Bach, Giuliani, Torroba, Martin (1996) Academica/ Fenn Music
10. Konzert für Gitarre und Streichquartett – Kompositionen für Konzertgitarre/ Concert for guitar and string quartet – Compositions for concert guitar (1996) Academica/ Fenn Music
11. Seelenmann/ Soul Man (1996) Academica/ Fenn Music
12. Happiness is a warm gun (1996) Academica/ Fenn Music
13. Frühe Bänder/ Early Tapes (1996) Academica/ Fenn Music

== Videos ==
1. Documentary concert video "Work for Orchestra 3 – An interactive work genesis" by Carlos Bustamante, Berlin 2017 (1:25h)
2. Documentary concert video "Work for Orchestra 2 – An interactive work genesis" by Carlos Bustamante, Berlin 2015 (1:00h)
3. Documentary concert video "Work for Orchestra 1 – An interactive work genesis" by Carlos Bustamante, Berlin 2013 (1:10h)
4. Europäische Originale/ European Originals – Rome/ London/ Paris/ Vienna 2005, (4 x 50min)
5. Isarufer im Herbst/ Isar-bank in autumn (2003, 50min)
6. Dynamic Video 1–10 (2002, 50min)
7. S15 Berlin Central Station - Sound installation (2026, online version)

== Music and video formats on this page ==
If your computer is not already prepared for playing .ogg and .ogv files, please follow the instruction for downloading the corresponding plug in here: Help! (Also visible beside the media files above)
