= Toku Do =

Studio album by Larry Coryell
- Released: 1988
- Recorded: September 8, 1987
- Studio: Van Gelder, Englewood Cliffs, NJ
- Genre: Jazz
- Length: 47:40
- Label: Muse; MR 5350
- Producer: Don Sickler

Larry Coryell chronology
Dedicated to Bill Evans and Scott LaFaro (1987)	Toku Do (1988)	Air Dancing (1988)

Toku Do is an album by guitarist Larry Coryell which was recorded in 1987 and released on the Muse label.

== Reception ==
Professional ratings
Review scores
Source	Rating
AllMusic	3.5/5 stars
DownBeat	4/5 stars

The AllMusic review by Scott Yanow stated, "Despite the exotic title, this is one of three fairly straight-ahead sets that guitarist Larry Coryell recorded for Muse from 1985-89. ... Excellent playing all around".

== Track listing ==
1. "Moment's Notice" (John Coltrane) – 6:03
2. "'Round Midnight" (Thelonious Monk, Cootie Williams, Bernie Hanighen) – 8:43
3. "Toku Do" (Buster Williams) – 6:57
4. "November Mood" (Stanley Cowell) – 6:03
5. "Just Friends" (John Klenner, Sam M. Lewis) – 8:21
6. "My Funny Valentine" (Richard Rodgers, Lorenz Hart) – 6:31
7. "Sophisticated Lady" (Duke Ellington, Irving Mills, Mitchell Parish) – 5:02

== Personnel ==
- Larry Coryell – guitar
- Stanley Cowell – piano
- Buster Williams – bass
- Beaver Harris – drums
