= Inner Space (album) =

Compilation album by Chick Corea
- Released: 1973
- Recorded: August 10, November 30 & December 1, 1966; March 27, 1968
- Studio: Atlantic Studios, New York City; A&R Studios, New York City
- Genre: Jazz
- Length: 75:08
- Label: Atlantic

Professional ratings
Review scores
Source	Rating
AllMusic	4/5 stars
The Rolling Stone Jazz Record Guide	3/5 stars
The Penguin Guide to Jazz Recordings	3/4 stars

Inner Space is a compilation album of Chick Corea music released by Atlantic Records in 1973. The album contains all four tracks from Corea's 1968 debut album, Tones for Joan's Bones as well as two previously unreleased tracks ("Inner Space" & "Guijira") from the same recording sessions and two tracks ("Windows" & "Trio for Flute, Bassoon and Piano") originally released on Hubert Laws' 1969 LP Laws' Cause.

== Release history ==
The album was first released as a double LP by Atlantic Records in 1973. Early CD re-issues omit two tracks, "Tones for Joan's Bones" and "This Is New", but the 2008 release on the Collectables Records label restores them.

"Windows" was recorded August 10, 1966 and originally released on Hubert Laws' 1969 LP Laws' Cause.

== Track listing ==
All tracks composed by Chick Corea except where noted.

=== Original double LP release ===
Side A

1. "Straight Up and Down" – 12:32
2. "This Is New" (Kurt Weill, Ira Gershwin) – 7:36

Side B

1. "Tones for Joan's Bones" – 6:03
2. "Litha" – 13:28

Side C

1. "Inner Space" – 9:18
2. "Windows" – 8:45

Side D

1. "Guijira" – 12:19
2. "Trio for Flute, Bassoon and Piano" – 5:07
- Tracks A1 to C1, D1 recorded at Atlantic Recording Studios, New York City, N.Y. on November 30 & December 1, 1966.
- Track C2 recorded at Atlantic Recording Studios, New York City, N.Y. on August 10, 1966.
- Track D2 recorded at A&R Studios, New York City, N.Y. NYC, March 27, 1968.
- Re-mixed at Atlantic Recording Studios, New York City, N.Y. in May, 1972.

=== Abridged CD re-issue ===
1. "Straight Up and Down" – 12:32
2. "Litha" – 13:28
3. "Inner Space" – 9:18
4. "Windows" – 8:45
5. "Guijira" – 12:19
6. "Trio for Flute, Bassoon and Piano" – 5:07

The 2008 release on the Collectables label restores "This Is New" and "Tones for Joan's Bones".

== Personnel ==
- Chick Corea – piano (on all tracks)
- Steve Swallow – bass (except "Windows" & "Trio for Flute, Bassoon and Piano")
- Joe Chambers – drums (except "Windows" & "Trio for Flute, Bassoon and Piano")
- Joe Farrell – tenor saxophone, flute (except "Windows" and "Trio for Flute, Bassoon and Piano")
- Woody Shaw – trumpet (except "Windows" & "Trio for Flute, Bassoon and Piano")

on "Windows"

- Hubert Laws – flute
- Ron Carter – bass
- Grady Tate – drums

on "Trio for Flute, Bassoon and Piano"

- Karl Porter – bassoon
- Hubert Laws – flute
