= Universal Syncopations =

Studio album by Miroslav Vitouš
- Released: September 29, 2003
- Recorded: 2002 & March 2003
- Studio: Universal Syncopation Studios, Italy (2002); Rainbow Studios, Oslo (2003)
- Genre: Jazz
- Length: 53:32
- Label: ECM; ECM 1863
- Producer: Manfred Eicher

Miroslav Vitouš chronology
Atmos (1993)	Universal Syncopations (2003)	Universal Syncopations II (2007)

Universal Syncopations is an album by Czech jazz bassist Miroslav Vitouš recorded between 2002–2003 and released on ECM later that year.

== Reception ==
Universal Syncopations was received positively by critics upon release, with John Fordham describing it, in his review for The Guardian, as "a wonderful contemporary jazz set [...] in which all the players reconsider their histories to maximise the intensity of the present." In a similarly positive review, Thom Jurek of AllMusic wrote, "Universal Syncopations is by turns a return to not the old forms, but rather to the manner of illustrating harmonic concepts in a quintet setting that allows for a maximum space between ensemble players while turning notions of swing, counterpoint, and rhythmic invention on their heads... Universal Syncopations is one of the most gorgeous sounding and toughly played dates of the calendar year."

Not all critics were as emphatically positive about the release. Writing for the BBC, Peter Marsh acknowledged the exceptional individual musical performances, but thought that there was at times a 'lack of cohesion' in the ensemble playing, making Universal Syncopations "a bit of a disappointment". In a similar vein, Thomas Conrad of the JazzTimes wrote that Universal Syncopations was most successful during the 'productive' synergies between Vitous, DeJohnette, Garbarek and Corea, noting that the three least satisfying tracks were those that included Wayne Bergeron, Valerie Ponomarev, Isaac Smith, and John McLaughlin. "Their weight interferes with the way this music dances on air", Conrad concluded.

Professional ratings
Review scores
Source	Rating
Allmusic	4/5 stars
The Penguin Guide to Jazz Recordings	4/4 stars
The Guardian	5/5 stars

== Track listing ==
All compositions by Miroslav Vitouš except as indicated.

1. "Bamboo Forest" - 4:37
2. "Univoyage" - 10:54
3. "Tramp Blues" - 5:19
4. "Faith Run" - 4:58
5. "Sun Flower" - 7:21
6. "Miro Bop" - 4:03
7. "Beethoven" (Jan Garbarek, Vitouš) - 7:18
8. "Medium" (Jack DeJohnette, Vitouš) - 5:09
9. "Brazil Waves" (Garbarek, Vitouš) - 4:26

== Personnel ==
- Miroslav Vitouš – double bass
- Jan Garbarek – soprano saxophone, tenor saxophone
- Chick Corea – piano
- John McLaughlin – guitar
- Jack DeJohnette – drums
- Wayne Bergeron – trumpet (tracks 2–4)
- Valery Ponomarev – trumpet, flugelhorn (tracks 2–4)
- Isaac Smith – trombone (tracks 2–4)

== Chart performance ==
Year	Chart	Position
2003	Billboard Top Jazz Albums	21
