= First Meeting (Miroslav Vitouš album) =

Studio album by Miroslav Vitouš
- Released: January 1980
- Recorded: May 1979
- Genre: Jazz
- Length: 46:51
- Label: ECM 1145
- Producer: Manfred Eicher

Miroslav Vitouš chronology
Guardian Angels (1979)	First Meeting (1980)	Miroslav Vitous Group (1981)

First Meeting is an album by Czech bassist Miroslav Vitouš recorded in May 1979 and released on ECM in January 1980. The quartet features reed player John Surman and rhythm section Kenny Kirkland and Jon Christensen.

== Reception ==
The AllMusic review by David R. Adler awarded the album 3 stars stating "Recommended but hard to find, First Meeting documents the strength of Vitouš' writing and playing."

Professional ratings
Review scores
Source	Rating
Allmusic	3/5 stars
The Rolling Stone Jazz Record Guide	3/5 stars
The Penguin Guide to Jazz Recordings	3.5/4 stars
DownBeat	4/5 stars

== Track listing ==
All compositions by Miroslav Vitouš except as indicated

1. "Silver Lake" - 10:52
2. "Beautiful Place To" - 5:11
3. "Trees" - 6:10
4. "Recycle" - 10:10
5. "First Meeting" (Miroslav Vitouš, Kenny Kirkland, John Surman, Jon Christensen) - 4:48
6. "Concerto in Three Parts" - 5:32
7. "You Make Me So Happy" - 4:33

== Personnel ==
- Miroslav Vitouš – double bass
- John Surman – soprano saxophone, bass clarinet
- Kenny Kirkland – piano
- Jon Christensen – drums
