= Three Stories (album) =

Studio album by Eldar Djangirov
- Released: April 5, 2011
- Genre: Modern Jazz
- Length: 70:00
- Label: Sony Masterworks

Eldar Djangirov chronology
Virtue (2009)	Three Stories (2011)	Breakthrough (2013)

Professional ratings
Review scores
Source	Rating
AllMusic	4/5 stars
All About Jazz	4.5/5 stars

Three Stories is an album by jazz pianist Eldar Djangirov, released on April 5, 2011, by Sony Masterworks. It is the seventh album released under his name and his first piano solo album, unlike his previous albums usually consisting of jazz trio.

== Background ==
As being a successful pianist even in his early years, Djangirov has gained undoubted fame as young jazz pianist, as earning 2008 Grammy Nomination for Best Contemporary Jazz Album. Unlike many other musicians who gain the fame in their youth and disappears as they grow, Djangirov has maintained his career and technique, and released his seventh album Three Stories in 2011. The 14 compositions enlisted in the album, each talking about three different stories, classical, standards, and originals, as the album title Three Stories suggests. The title also has another meaning, as "three-movement composition which consists of three musical 'narratives,' each telling a distinct story".

By this album, Eldar has demonstrated his definite talent in rearranging those standards in his own melodic way with few essential jazz techniques such as ragtime. When playing classical, Eldar demonstrates his exceptionally speedy and flawless playing with sterility. These ability of Eldar in both jazz and classical brings the comparison of Eldar with Keith Jarrett for creating a work with both classical and jazz influences. These talents are put together to form the originals of Eldar, to distinguish him from other jazz or classical musicians.

== Music ==
There are 3 different facets of the musics in this album: 3 originals, 3 classical pieces, and 8 standards.

== Reception ==
This album received many compliments from various media and sources. One reviewer noted that "Three Stories showcases a sense of touch and feel, and a thorough comprehension of the original compositions." Another reviewer asserted that "Three Storiesis certainly jazz piano, but it's the kind that belongs in a recital hall… Djangirov gets to the heart of every song." Also many has credited him not only with extraordinary talent for young musician, but also with the ability to cross the frontier between jazz and classical.

== Track listing ==
No.	Title	Writer(s)	Length
1.	"I Should Care"	Sammy Cahn	5:12
2.	"Prelude In C # Major"	Johann Sebastian Bach	3:58
3.	"Darn That Dream"	James Van Heusen	5:50
4.	"Windows"	Chick Corea	5:01
5.	"Etude Op. 2 No.1"	Alexander Scriabin	5:50
6.	"In Walked Bud"	Thelonious Monk	4:54
7.	"Three Stories"	Eldar Djangirov	5:44
8.	"So Damn Lucky"	Dave Matthews	4:18
9.	"Embraceable You"	George Gershwin	4:34
10.	"Russian Lullaby"	Djangirov	3:34
11.	"Air on a G String"	Bach	2:59
12.	"Impromptu"	Djangirov	5:46
13.	"Rhapsody in Blue"	Gershwin	15:00
14.	"Donna Lee"	Charlie Parker	3:20
