= Infinite Search =

Studio album by Miroslav Vitouš
- Released: 1970
- Recorded: October 8, 1969
- Studio: A&R Studios, New York
- Genre: Jazz fusion, post-bop, free funk
- Length: 47:20
- Label: Embryo Records, Atlantic Records
- Producer: Herbie Mann

Miroslav Vitouš chronology
Infinite Search (1970)	Purple (1970)

Infinite Search is the debut album by Czech jazz bassist Miroslav Vitouš. It was released in 1970, on Embryo Records. The same album has been released under three different titles. The second release is Mountain in the Clouds, a remixed and enhanced version of the same recordings (1972 US edition: Atlantic SD 1622 and 1972 German edition: Atlantic ATL 50 406), featuring one extra track, "Cérečka." The third is The Bass (1972 German edition: Hörzu Black Label SD 1622), also with the bonus track "Cérečka".

== Reception ==
At The Audiophile Man on 25 September 2016, journalist Paul Rigby notes that:

I was impressed... with the improv technique of John McLaughlin, who darts into the gaps like a shoal of fish occupying every available sea space. Fans of more contemporary jazz releases will be very familiar with Vitouš as a recording artist for ECM. If you are, then this album will be an eye-opening glimpse into the man’s glittering past. A superb album.

Professional ratings
Review scores
Source	Rating
AllMusic	4.5/5 stars
The Penguin Guide to Jazz Recordings	3.5/4 stars

== Track listing ==
No.	Title	Writer(s)	Length
1.	"Freedom Jazz Dance"	Eddie Harris	10:54
2.	"Mountain In The Clouds"	Miroslav Vitouš	1:51
3.	"When Face Gets Pale"	Miroslav Vitouš	7:38
4.	"Infinite Search"	Miroslav Vitouš	6:49
5.	"I Will Tell Him On You"	Miroslav Vitouš	11:00
6.	"Epilogue"	Miroslav Vitouš	6:57
7.	"Cérečka" (2013 Rhino Records CD reissue)	Miroslav Vitouš	2:45

== Personnel ==
Musicians

- Miroslav Vitouš – bass, leader
- Joe Henderson – tenor saxophone
- John McLaughlin – electric guitar
- Herbie Hancock – electric piano
- Jack DeJohnette – drums (all tracks except track #6)
- Joe Chambers – drums (track #6)

Production

- Herbie Mann – producer
- Dave Green – engineer
- Haig Adishian – album design
- Joel Brodsky – photography
