= Emergence (Miroslav Vitouš album) =

Studio album by Miroslav Vitouš
- Released: October 1986
- Recorded: September 1985
- Studio: Tonstudio Bauer; Ludwigsburg, W. Germany
- Genre: Jazz
- Length: 53:02
- Label: ECM 1312
- Producer: Manfred Eicher

Miroslav Vitouš chronology
Journey's End (1983)	Emergence (1986)	Trio Music, Live in Europe (1986)

Emergence is a solo album by Czech bassist Miroslav Vitouš recorded in September 1985 and released on ECM October the following year.

== Reception ==
The AllMusic review by David R. Adler awarded the album 3 stars stating "Emergence showcases Miroslav Vitouš in a solo bass setting, with no overdubs. It's austere and challenging, but Vitous is never ponderous; he sustains plenty of interest with his passion and staggering technique, dividing his time equally between pizzicato and arco statements... An excellent complement to other solo bass statements on ECM, most notably by Dave Holland and Gary Peacock".

Professional ratings
Review scores
Source	Rating
AllMusic	3/5 stars
The Penguin Guide to Jazz Recordings	3.5/4 stars

== Track listing ==
All compositions by Miroslav Vitouš except as indicated

1. "Epilogue" - 8:13
2. "Transformation" - 5:58
3. "Atlantis Suite: Emergence of the Spirit" - 4:53
4. "Atlantis Suite: Matter and Spirit" - 1:56
5. "Atlantis Suite: The Choice" - 1:58
6. "Atlantis Suite: Destruction into Energy" - 3:05
7. "Wheel of Fortune (When Face Gets Pale)" - 6:08
8. "Regards to Gershwin's Honeyman" - 3:28
9. "Alice in Wonderland" (Sammy Fain, Bob Hilliard) - 3:43
10. "Morning Lake for Ever" - 5:34
11. "Variations on Spanish Themes" - 8:38

=== Notes ===
- In 2011, Ricardo Villalobos and Max Loderbauer used samples of Emergence as the basis for the track "Reemergence" on the remix album Re:ECM.

== Personnel ==
- Miroslav Vitouš – double bass
