= Schizophrenia (Wayne Shorter album) =

Studio album by Wayne Shorter
- Released: May 1969; July 1995 (CD)
- Recorded: March 10, 1967
- Studio: Van Gelder, Englewood Cliffs, New Jersey
- Genre: Post-bop
- Length: 36:37
- Label: Blue Note; BST 84297; CDP 7243 8 32096 2 0
- Producer: Francis Wolff

Wayne Shorter chronology
Adam's Apple (1967)	Schizophrenia (1969)	Super Nova (1969)

Schizophrenia is the eleventh album by Wayne Shorter, recorded on March 10, 1967, and released on the Blue Note label in May 1969. The album features five Shorter compositions and an arrangement of James Spaulding's "Kryptonite". The album features Shorter with alto saxophonist/flautist Spaulding, trombonist Curtis Fuller, pianist Herbie Hancock, bassist Ron Carter and drummer Joe Chambers.

== Reception ==
The AllMusic review by Stephen Thomas Erlewine stated: "This music exists at the border between post-bop and free jazz – it's grounded in post-bop, but it knows what is happening across the border. Within a few years, he would cross that line, but Schizophrenia crackles with the excitement of Shorter and his colleagues trying to balance the two extremes".

Professional ratings
Review scores
Source	Rating
AllMusic	4.5/5 stars
DownBeat	4/5 stars
The Penguin Guide to Jazz Recordings	3/4 stars
The Rolling Stone Jazz Record Guide	4/5 stars

== Track listing ==
All compositions by Wayne Shorter except where noted.

1. "Tom Thumb" – 6:16
2. "Go" – 5:42
3. "Schizophrenia" – 6:50
4. "Kryptonite" (James Spaulding) – 6:29
5. "Miyako" – 5:00
6. "Playground" – 6:20

== Personnel ==
- Wayne Shorter – tenor saxophone
- Curtis Fuller – trombone
- James Spaulding – flute, alto saxophone
- Herbie Hancock – piano
- Ron Carter – bass
- Joe Chambers – drums
