= Atmos (album) =

Studio album by Miroslav Vitouš with Jan Garbarek
- Released: March 1993
- Recorded: February 1992
- Studios: Rainbow Studio; Oslo, Norway
- Genre: Jazz
- Length: 42:02
- Labels: ECM; ECM 1475
- Producer: Manfred Eicher

Miroslav Vitouš chronology
StAR (1991)	Atmos (1993)	Universal Syncopations (2003)

Jan Garbarek chronology
StAR (1991)	Atmos (1993)	Twelve Moons (1993)

Atmos is an album by Czech jazz bassist Miroslav Vitouš, featuring Norwegian jazz saxophonist Jan Garbarek, recorded in February 1992 and released on ECM the following year.

== Reception ==
Professional ratings
Review scores
Source	Rating
AllMusic	3/5 stars

The AllMusic review by Scott Yanow awarded the album 3 stars stating "Garbarek does emit some passion on soprano and Vitouš augments the music at times with some percussive sounds made by hitting his bass; once in awhile [sic] he also adds brief samples from what he calls 'the Miroslav Vitouš Symphony Orchestra Sound Library.' But in general this is a stereotypical ECM date, recommended to fans of that genre."

== Track listing ==
All compositions by Miroslav Vitouš except as indicated

1. "Pegasos" - 6:21
2. "Goddess" - 7:10
3. "Forthcoming" - 4:04
4. "Atmos" - 5:09
5. "Time Out Part 1" (Jan Garbarek, Miroslav Vitouš) - 2:50
6. "Direvision" - 4:51
7. "Time Out Part 2" (Garbarek, Vitouš) - 2:16
8. "Helikon" - 3:00
9. "Hippukrene" - 6:52

== Personnel ==
- Miroslav Vitouš – bass
- Jan Garbarek – soprano saxophone, tenor saxophone
