= Eldar Djangirov =

American jazz pianist

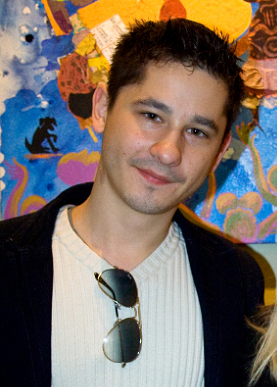

Background information
- Born: Eldar E. Djangirov; January 28, 1987 (age 39); Frunze, Kyrgyz SSR, Soviet Union
- Origin: United States
- Genres: Jazz
- Instrument: Piano
- Years active: 1996–present
- Website: www.eldarmusic.com

Eldar Djangirov (born January 28, 1987), also known as Eldar, is an American jazz pianist.

== Early life ==
He was born in Bishkek, Kyrgyz SSR, Soviet Union to Tatiana, a piano teacher, and Emil, a professor of mechanical engineering. He grew up in Kansas City, Missouri, from the age of 10 and also lived in San Diego, California, during his teenage years.

== Career ==
Eldar began playing the piano when he was three years old. The first piece he remembers learning was "C Jam Blues". He later took classical lessons and was "discovered" at age 9 by the late New York City jazz aficionado Charles McWhorter, who saw him play at a festival in Siberia. The family relocated to Kansas City, drawn there in large part by the city's jazz history. During his Kansas City years, even before reaching his teens, Eldar already started building a reputation as a child prodigy, appearing on Marian McPartland's NPR show, Piano Jazz, when he was only 12 years old, being the youngest performer to appear on her show. Eldar attended Interlochen Center for the Arts in his young teenage years. Eldar attended St. Elizabeth's grade school and the Barstow School in Kansas City. Eventually, the family moved to San Diego where he attended the Francis W. Parker School (San Diego), and then to the Los Angeles area where he attended University of Southern California's Thornton School of Music. Eldar's playing style is characterized by prodigious technique and musicality. Downbeat noted in a review by Bob Doerschuk: "his command of the instrument is beyond staggering." He was signed to Sony Music at 18 and released 5 albums. His album, "Re-imagination," was nominated for a GRAMMY. Eldar has extensively toured throughout Europe, Asia and North America.

Eldar has been variously compared to Art Tatum, Oscar Peterson, Herbie Hancock and more; yet he also seems to absorb harmonic expansiveness from McCoy Tyner and at times the lyrical sensitivity from Bill Evans. Eldar performed at Grammy Awards telecast and was honored the first time in many years as a jazz artist. Eldar has also been seen on Conan O'Brien, CBS Saturday Early Show, Jimmy Kimmel Live and CBS Sunday Morning.

== Personal life ==
As of 2007, he resided in New York City.

== Discography ==
=== As leader ===
Year recorded	Title	Label	Notes
2001	Eldar	D&D	
2003	Handprints	D&D	
2005	Eldar	Sony	Most tracks trio, with John Patitucci (bass), Todd Strait (drums); one track quartet, with Michael Brecker (tenor sax) added
2007	Live at the Blue Note	Sony	Most tracks trio, with Marco Panascia (bass), Todd Strait (drums); one track quartet with Chris Botti (trumpet) added; one track quartet with Roy Hargrove added; in concert
2007	Re-Imagination	Sony	With James Genus and Marco Panascia (electric bass; separately), Carlos Henriquez (double bass), David Lai (Fender Rhodes), DJ Logic (turntables, programming, effects), Mike Moreno (guitar), Todd Strait, Ali Jackson, and Terreon Gulley (drums; separately)
2009	Virtue	Sony	Some tracks trio, with Armando Gola (bass), Ludwig Afonso (drums); some tracks quartet with Felipe Lamoglia (sax) added; one track quartet with Nicholas Payton (trumpet) added; one track quartet with Joshua Redman (tenor sax, soprano sax) added
2011	Three Stories	Sony	Solo piano
2013	Breakthrough	Motéma Music	Most tracks trio, with Armando Gola (bass), Ludwig Afonso (drums); one track quartet with Chris Potter (tenor sax) added; one track quartet with Joe Locke (vibraphone) added
2013	Bach / Brahms / Prokofiev	Motéma Music	Solo piano; classical music
2015	World Tour Vol. 1	New Struggle Music	
2019	Letter to Liz	Twelve Tone Resonance	Solo piano
2020	’’Rhapsodize’’	Twelve Tone Resonance	

=== As sideman ===
Year recorded	Leader	Title	Label
2012	J. D. Allen	Grace	Savant
2013	Ali Jackson	Amalgamations	Sunnyside
