= Gunnar Geisse =

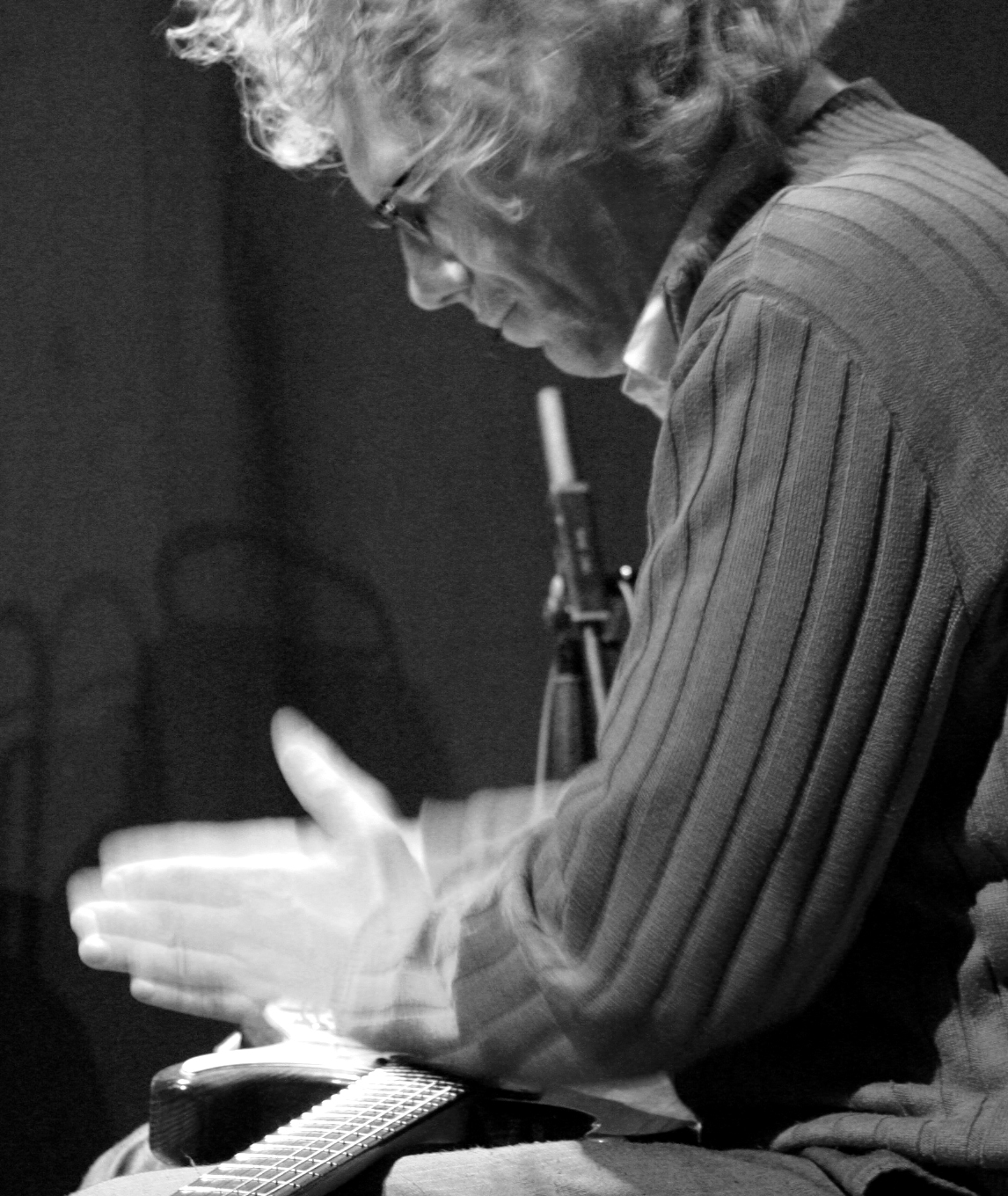
- Born: July 11, 1962 (age 64); Giessen, Germany
- Occupation: Musician

Gunnar Geisse (born 1962 in Gießen is a German musician, improviser, composer, and interpreter. He plays several string instruments including guitar, banjo, mandolin, and a variety of instruments from Central Asia, among them the Uzbek and the Persian dotâr. Gunnar Geisse has been living in Munich, Germany since 1985.

== Musical career ==
Gunnar Geisse began his career in his early youth as a rock guitarist. With the end of his schooling he gravitated in the direction of jazz. Attending an Ornette Coleman concert at the Moers Jazz Festival in Germany, he saw Coleman carried onto the stage in a coffin, jump out dressed in a glittering disco outfit and play in the free jazz style that he helped create. After this key experience, Geisse bought toy plastic saxophones for the members of his band and threw away his original plan to play jazz standards. It was during this time that improvisation and an experimental approach became the foundation of his understanding of music. His first professional engagement was with the "New York Broadway Ensemble" with which he toured throughout Europe for the next two years.

The avant-garde combo "Brother Virus" which along with Geisse included Werner Klausnitzer, Patrick Scales, and Maurice de Martin, achieved fame at the end of the 1980s. It would leave a major impression on Geisse. The band was invited to play at the Knitting Factory in New York, and was one of the first bands to play serious improvised music "live" on prime time German TV – Dagobert Lindlau's "Veranda". With "Brother Virus" Gunnar Geisse took the first steps on his own musical journey, a journey that was already apparent in his earlier development. In 1991 Enja Records released the "Brother Virus" album "Happy Hour".

Geisse lost the two middle fingers on his right hand in a mountain climbing accident in 1992. With the severity of the injury and subsequent operations, it was unclear as to whether Geisse would be able to continue his playing career. It was during his hospital stays that he was able to contemplate the implications of 20th century new music compositional techniques, and in so doing discovered his deep interest in structure. He wrote his first composition during one of his hospital stays. For him to have a good aural understanding of the piece, he proceeded to overdub the tracks – some 200 in total. Out of his interest in structure, Geisse worked together with the Institute for Experimental Physics at the University of Magdeburg in the area of complexity theory, non-linear phenomena and simulation, and inserted structural models of nature into his music. The recording was released under the title "AtEM".

While judging a music composition competition, Hans Zender - conductor of the SWR symphony orchestra und professor for composition at the College of Music and Arts in Frankfurt, Germany - took notice of Geisse's extraordinary music. Subsequently Gunnar Geisse received a stipend to compose at the prestigious Schloss Solitude Academy for one year. It was at Solitude that he composed "Das diskrete Jetzt" (The Discrete Now). He delved deeper into the phenomena of musical time. On a renewed search for natural structural references, he received suggestions and impetus from the Institute for Medical Psychology at LMU Munich on the theme "time and its perception". The classic compositional parameters of tempo, meter, and rhythm are pushed into the background by this broadening of perspective through a psychological perception of time.

Gunnar Geisse has received various awards and stipends, including the Musical Achievement Award of the City of Munich, and the Schloss Solitude Academy's Composition Stipend.

== Musical Collaborations ==
Gunnar Geisse has played with musicians from the three major areas of his musical life: experimental/improvised music, new music, and contemporary jazz. They include:

Richard Barrett, Marty Cook, Phil Durrant, Vinko Globokar, Barry Guy, Franz Hautzinger, Jason Kahn, Thomas Lehn, Michael Lentz, George Lewis, David Moss, Günter Müller, Olga Neuwirth, Phill Niblock, Evan Parker, Giancarlo Schiaffini, Ignaz Schick, Ed Schuller, Mike Svoboda, Gary Thomas, Wu Wei, Xu Fengxia.

Gunnar Geisse has worked with or played works of Hans-Jürgen von Bose, John Cage, Peter Maxwell Davies, Fred Frith, Gérard Grisey, Hans Werner Henze, Tom Johnson, Helmut Lachenmann, Anestis Logothetis, Chico Mello, Josef Anton Riedl, Gioacchino Rossini, Dieter Schnebel, James Tenney, Kurt Weill, Jörg Widmann, Christian Wolff, and Udo Zimmermann.

He has also played as soloist under the direction of Stefan Asbury, Paul Daniel, Peter Eötvös, Franck Ollu, and Lothar Zagrosek with the Bavarian Radio Symphony Orchestra (BR), The Bavarian State Opera Orchestra, the Stuttgart Radio Symphony Orchestra (SWR), the Stuttgart City Orchestra, and the Munich City Theatre Orchestra on Gärtnerplatz.

Gunnar Geisse was/is a member of the following ensembles: Brother Virus, le petit chien, ICI ensemble, Go Guitars, Berlin Jazz Composers Ensemble, Fractal Gumbo, NIE Quartett.

== Discography ==
- 2008 ICI ENSEMBLE & Olga Neuwirth, NEOS (to be released in the fall of 2008)
- 2007 Gunnar Geisse "MEtA", CS creative sources records
- 2007 ICI ENSEMBLE & George Lewis, PAO
- 2006 ICI ENSEMBLE "The Wisdom Of Pearls", PAO/BR
- 2005 GO GUITARS & SINGER PUR "Electric Seraphim", K&K Verlagsanstalt Edition Kloster Maulbronn
- 2003 Maurice de Martin BERLIN JAZZ COMPOSERS ENSEMBLE "Transylvaniana", CHAOS Records
- 2002 Marty Cook "Fractal Gumbo", TUTU records
- 2001 Adam Pierończyk "Digivooco" feat. Gary Thomas, PAO
- 2001 Michael Lentz & GO GUITARS "ENDE GUT. Sprechakte", edition selene/BR
- 2000 Gunnar Geisse "AtEM", NYX
- 2000 Drum For Your Life "Glückmann", Samara Tone
- 1999 le petit chien "woof.", Enja Records
- 1992 No Distance "different guitars", Outside Records
- 1991 Brother Virus "Happy Hour" (Knitting Factory NYC), TUTU/Enja Records
- 1987/88 Gunnar Geisse "ballads", MGI records/Intercord (also available as LP)

With William Parker

- Winter Sun Crying (NEOS Jazz, 2009 [2011]) - with the ICI Ensemble

== Literature ==
- Article "Süddeutsche Zeitung" 6 December 2007 "Außen Glanz innen Gräben"
- Article "Jazzzeit" N° 64, January/February, 2007, Sirus W. Pakzad, "Aus München?!"
- Article "Süddeutsche Zeitung", 5 May 2004, Tobias Söldener, "Fremde Welten"
- Article "Süddeutsche Zeitung - Münchner Kultur", 8 July 1999, Alex Rühle, "Eine Formel für musikalische Lust"
- Article "Süddeutsche Zeitung - Feuilleton", 18 May 1998, Markus Scherer, "Der Rhythmus des Seins"
- Article "Down Beat" 1993, Publisher: Kevin Maher, Review: "Brother Virus - Happy Hour", p. 48
- Article "JazzTimes" 1993, Publisher: Glenn Sabin, Review "Brother Virus - Happy Hour", p. 55
