= Miroslav Vitouš =

Czech jazz bassist (born 1947)

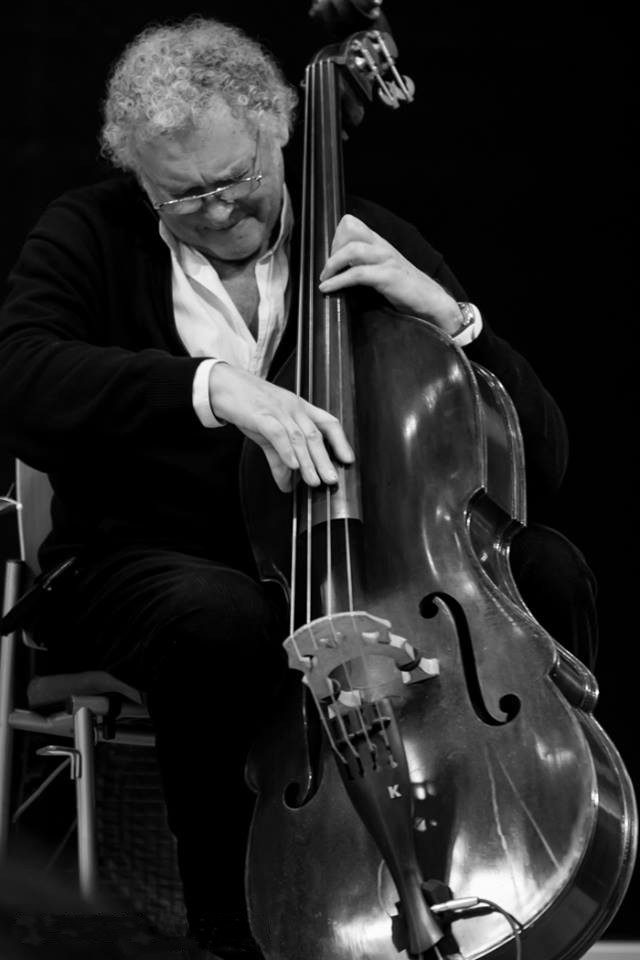
- Vitouš in 2014

Background information
- Born: Miroslav Ladislav Vitouš; 6 December 1947 (age 78); Prague, Czechoslovakia
- Genres: Jazz, jazz fusion, funk
- Occupations: Musician, songwriter
- Instruments: Double bass; bass guitar
- Years active: 1962–present
- Labels: ECM, Freedom
- Website: miroslavvitous.com

Miroslav Ladislav Vitouš (born 6 December 1947) is a Czech jazz bassist. He is known as a founding member of the ensemble Weather Report, and for working as a bandleader and alongside Chick Corea, Jack DeJohnette and others.

== Biography ==
=== Early life and education ===
Born in Prague, Vitouš began the violin at age six, switching to piano after about three years, and then to bass at age fourteen. As a young man in Europe, Vitouš was a competitive swimmer. One of his early music groups was the Junior Trio with his brother Alan on drums and Jan Hammer on keyboards. He studied music at the Prague Conservatory under František Pošta, and won a music contest in Vienna in 1966 that gave him a scholarship to the Berklee School of Music in Boston, which he attended one year before going to Chicago to play with a group co-led by the classically inclined trombonist Bob Brookmeyer and flugelhorn pioneer Clark Terry.

=== Early career (1967–1970) ===
Miles Davis saw Vitouš playing in Chicago with Brookmeyer and Terry in 1967 and invited him to join his own group playing at the Village Gate in New York City. It was with Davis that Vitouš first encountered saxophonist Wayne Shorter, keyboardist Herbie Hancock and the Davis-centric scene that was transforming mainstream jazz from late hard bop into what would be known as jazz fusion.

1968 saw the first of Vitouš's partnerships with several musicians who would be a major part of his soundscape over the course of his career. With vibraphonist Roy Ayers, Vitouš played on flautist Herbie Mann's album Windows Opened. He also split bass duties with Ron Carter on Ayers' Stoned Soul Picnic, produced by Mann. Vitouš played on a prolific run of Mann's albums released through 1971, including The Inspiration I Feel, electric bass on "Hold On, I'm Coming" from Memphis Underground, Live at the Whisky A Go Go, Stone Flute (again splitting the bass chair with Carter), and a cover of the Beatles' "Come Together" on Muscle Shoals Nitty Gritty.

Also in 1968, Vitouš and drummer Roy Haynes joined a Chick Corea-led trio, for what would be the first of several outings featuring Vitouš and one or both of them. At the end of the year they released the highly acclaimed Now He Sings, Now He Sobs. Some of the tracks recorded at this time were later included in Corea's 1975 album Circling In.

Finally, 1968 saw Vitouš join drummer Jack DeJohnette, with whom he would often collaborate over the length of his career, on The DeJohnette Complex, DeJohnette's debut album as bandleader. Vitouš and Eddie Gómez split duties on bass. Haynes, multireedist Bennie Maupin, and pianist Stanley Cowell rounded out the ensemble.

The following year, Vitouš recorded his debut album as a bandleader, Infinite Search for Mann's Embryo label (reissued in 1972 on Atlantic as Mountain In The Clouds and on a German label as The Bass). The album featured Hancock on the electric piano, Joe Henderson on tenor sax, John McLaughlin on electric guitar, and DeJohnette and Joe Chambers splitting duties on drums. In 2016, journalist Paul Rigby looked back at the album, calling it "superb" and "an eye-opening glimpse into [Vitouš]'s glittering past." That year, he recorded his contributions to guitarist Larry Coryell's Spaces with McLaughlin, Corea, and drummer Billy Cobham. Additional tracks from these sessions were later released on Coryell's 1975 album Planet End.

1969 was also the year that Vitouš first stepped into the recording studio with Wayne Shorter, with whom he'd played under Miles Davis' leadership two years prior. He played on Shorter's twelfth album, Super Nova, alongside McLaughlin, DeJohnette, Corea, and Brazilian percussionist Airto Moreira, among others.

1970 saw Vitouš continue as bandleader as he recorded Purple for Columbia, supported by McLaughlin, Cobham and the keyboardist and fellow Davis alum Joe Zawinul. He also split bass duties with Walter Booker on Zawinul's eponymous album, to which Shorter contributed soprano saxophone on one track. The album was released on Atlantic the following year.

Again under Shorter's leadership, he played in the 1970 sessions for what would be released in 1974 as Moto Grosso Feio, splitting bass duties with higher-billed fellow Davis alums Carter and Dave Holland. 1969 and 1970's various collaborations between combinations of Shorter, Vitouš, and Zawinul surrounded by other jazz musicians marked a transition to the next, joint stage of their careers.

=== Founding member of Weather Report (1970–1973) ===
In 1970, Shorter, Zawinul, and Vitouš formed the founding core of the jazz group Weather Report. There's some dispute over how the band initially coalesced. According to Zawinul, it began when he and Shorter recruited Vitouš, who had recently played with each of them separately. According to Vitouš himself, it was he and Shorter who actually founded Weather Report, with Shorter bringing in Zawinul afterwards. Given the fluidity of the scene's jazz lineups at the time, the recollections need not be mutually exclusive, and in any event, it was those three musicians who formed the initial core of the project.

Over their 16-year career, Weather Report explored various types of music, predominantly centered on jazz (initially the free variety), but also incorporating elements of art music, ethnic music, R&B, funk, and rock. While their work was often called jazz fusion, the band members generally distanced themselves from that term. From the start, the band took the unusual approach of abandoning the traditional soloist/accompaniment demarcation of straight-ahead jazz and featured opportunities for continuous improvisation by every member of the band.

Vitouš and Zawinul experimented with electronic effects pedals, which up to that time had primarily been used by rock guitarists. Zawinul used them on electric piano and synthesizers, and Vitouš on his upright bass, which he frequently bowed through distortion to create a second horn-like voice behind or alongside Shorter.

In reviews of Weather Report's first three albums republished in Christgau's Record Guide: Rock Albums of the Seventies, rock critic Robert Christgau situated the band as a keyboards-and-sax-centered development from the sound of Miles Davis' 1969 album In a Silent Way, on which Zawinul and Shorter had played, but Vitouš had not. Christgau also saw the Vitouš composition "Crystal" from I Sing the Body Electric as "a flop." "Crystal" was Vitouš's only solely authored contribution to the album whose sleeve featured a highly stylized illustration of a solitary figure standing before a keyboard, and Christgau found the song to be out of step with the literally and metaphorically "electric" direction of the rest of the record.

==== Creative differences and departure from Weather Report ====
[Miroslav] loved funk, and he tried to play it, but he wasn't a funk player. It wasn't where he came from. He didn't connect up with how to go there. He could listen to it, talk about it, and he admired it, but that's not what came out of him, so that was something that held back where Joe wanted to go at the time I was with them. Melodically and rhythmically, Miroslav was great; what he did do, in terms of where I was coming from, was very unique. Miroslav was still playing acoustic, and it was an odd kind of a funk. It was very... interesting!

— Weather Report touring drummer Greg Errico on Miroslav Vitouš

Vitouš and Zawinul were finding themselves at creative loggerheads, since the former preferred Weather Report's original lightly structured, improvisational approach and the latter wished to continue to integrate other popular African diaspora and African-American music styles. Retrospectively, Zawinul accused Vitouš of being unable to play funk convincingly (something corroborated by Greg Errico, a former Sly and the Family Stone drummer who briefly toured with the band) and claimed that he had not written enough songs. Vitouš countered that he had in fact brought in compositions, but that Zawinul had been unable to play them. Vitouš has also accused Zawinul of having been "a first-class manipulator" primarily interested in commercial success. When Shorter sided with Zawinul, the original three-man partnership broke down acrimoniously and Vitouš left Weather Report, moving on to a solo career as bandleader and composer.

Vitouš co-wrote with Zawinul and recorded his final contribution to Weather Report in 1973. This was "American Tango," which appeared on the band's fourth album Mysterious Traveller the following year. Vitouš was replaced in the subsequent sessions for Mysterious Traveller by electric bassist Alphonso Johnson. The record is the band's first to predominantly use electric bass and incorporate the liberal uses of funk, R&B grooves, and rock in what would develop into the hallmark of the band's signature late-period sound. At the same time, a more restricted compositional format became evident on this album, replacing the broadly open improvisation structures used on the first three albums.

Vitouš later said of his total experience with the band, "I enjoyed the beginning of it very much, but it turned into a little bit of a drag in the end because Joe Zawinul wanted to go in another direction. The band was seeking success and fame and they basically changed their music to go a commercial way into a black funk thing". He also felt aggrieved financially, commenting, "I was an equal partner and basically, I didn't get anything. We had a corporation together that was completely ignored. If you have a company and three people own it, and then two people say 'Okay, we don't want to work like this anymore. It's just two of us now', normally, they break down the stock and pay off the third person".

=== Later career (1974–present) ===
==== Collaborations ====
After leaving Weather Report, Vitouš's default mode was collaboration and work as a sideman with a wide range of partners, from his old bandleader Larry Coryell and the drummer and fellow Weather Report and Coryell alum Alphonse Mouzon to Stan Getz and Flora Purim. He has also worked with Freddie Hubbard and Michel Petrucciani.

==== Festivals and live performances ====
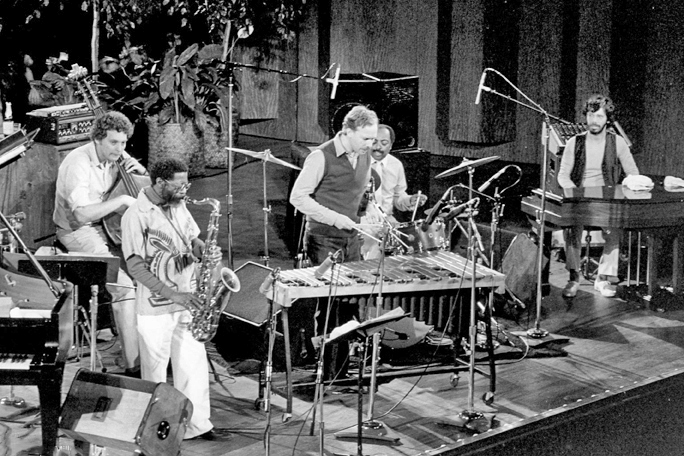
Vitous with Roy Haynes Quintet 1981

In 1981, Vitouš performed at the Woodstock Jazz Festival held in celebration of the tenth anniversary of the Creative Music Studio, and in 1984 he collaborated with fellow bassist Stanley Clarke. In 1988, Vitouš moved back to Europe to concentrate on composing but nonetheless continued to perform in festivals.

==== Albums on ECM ====
Vitouš joined the ECM stable of performers in 1978 to play in a trio with guitarist Terje Rypdal and DeJohnette; he had most recently been with Arista Records. ECM, founded in 1969, was developing a reputation for supporting genre-fluid releases that often freely mixed jazz, classical, and world music influences. ECM's stable of artists would trade contributions back and forth on one anothers' often dense and intellectual albums in a fluent manner that attracted both criticism and praise. Vitouš's classical, collaborative, and versatile bass and fluid give-and-take approach to band-leadership fit the sound of his new label and labelmates over the coming decades. The trio of Rypdal, Vitouš, and DeJohnette followed up their eponymous first album three years later with To Be Continued.

In 1979, Vitouš stepped back into the role of bandleader, recording and releasing First Meeting on ECM. 1980's Miroslav Vitous Group was later praised in a five-star review by John Kelman in All About Jazz as "exceptionally good." There followed an occasional run of Vitouš-led albums including Journey's End (1982), Atmos (1992—featuring saxophonist Jan Garbarek), Universal Syncopations (2003, with Garbarek, Corea, McLaughlin, and DeJohnette among others), and Universal Syncopations II (2004-2005). These received largely positive specialist reviews that often discussed them in the context of the ECM house sound: "highly recommended," "gorgeous sounding and toughly played," and "A quintessentially ECM aesthetic is very much at work on this solid effort, which will be enthusiastically welcomed by those who complain that Vitouš hasn't recorded often enough as a leader."

1982 brought Vitouš back with Corea and Haynes for the first time since the late 1960s, as they released Trio Music on ECM, following it up two years later with Trio Music Live in Europe. The three reunited again in 2001 for a concert in a series entitled "Rendezvous in New York" in celebration of Corea's 60th birthday. The album of the same name came out not on ECM but on Corea's Stretch label in 2003 and earned Corea a Grammy Award for Best Improvised Jazz Solo for the composition "Matrix".

Vitouš released the solo bass album Emergence on ECM in 1985. David R. Adler said in Allmusic of the bassist's performance in the solitary format, "Emergence showcases Miroslav Vitouš in a solo bass setting, with no overdubs. It's austere and challenging, but Vitous is never ponderous; he sustains plenty of interest with his passion and staggering technique, dividing his time equally between pizzicato and arco statements."

Vitouš and drummer Peter Erskine joined Garbarek on Garbarek's album StAR in 1991. The bassist later said of his rapport with the Norwegian saxophonist, "I am a Slavic musician and it is deeply inside of me. I consider [Garbarek] to be like my musical brother."

==== Miroslav Philharmonik ====
In 2005, Vitouš released Miroslav Philhamonik, an orchestra and choir virtual instrument he recorded at Dvořák Hall inside the Rudolfinum in Prague. The instrumental parts were performed by the Czech Philharmonic.

== Discography ==
=== As leader/co-leader ===
- 1969: Infinite Search (Embryo, 1970)
- 1970: Purple (CBS/Sony, 1970) – in Japan only
- 1976?: Magical Shepherd (Warner Bros., 1976)
- 1976?: Majesty Music (Arista, 1976)
- 1977?: Miroslav (Arista/Freedom, 1977)
- 1978: Guardian Angels with George Otsuka, John Scofield, Kenny Kirkland, Mabumi Yamaguchi (Trio, 1979)
- 1979: First Meeting (ECM, 1980)
- 1980: Miroslav Vitous Group (ECM, 1981)
- 1982: Journey's End (ECM, 1983)
- 1985: Emergence (ECM, 1986)
- 1992: Atmos with Jan Garbarek (ECM, 1993)
- 2002: Universal Syncopations (ECM, 2003)
- 2004–2005: Universal Syncopations II (ECM, 2007)
- 2006–2007: Remembering Weather Report with Michel Portal (ECM, 2009)
- 2010–2011: Music of Weather Report (ECM, 2016)
- 2015: Wings with Adam Pierończyk (For Tune, 2015)
- 2016: Live at NOSPR with Adam Pierończyk (Jazz Sound, 2019) – live
- 2016: Ziljabu Nights (Intuition, 2016)
- 2016: Ad-Lib Orbits with Adam Pierończyk (PAO, 2017)
- 2018: Moravian Romance with Emil Viklický (Venus, 2018) – live
- 2026: Mountain Call (ECM, recorded 2003 – 2010) with Jack DeJohnette, Esperanza Spalding, Bob Mintzer, Gary Campbell, Gerald Cleaver, members of Czech National Symphony Orchestra

=== As a member of Weather Report ===
- Weather Report (Columbia, 1971)
- I Sing the Body Electric (Columbia, 1972) – rec. 1971–1972
- Live in Tokyo (CBS/Sony, 1972) – live
- Sweetnighter (Columbia, 1973)
- Mysterious Traveller (Columbia, 1974) – rec. 1973–1974

=== As sideman ===
With Roy Ayers

- Stoned Soul Picnic (Atlantic, 1968)
- All Blues (Columbia, 1969)
- Herbie Mann Presents Comin' Home Baby Roy Ayers Quartet 1 (Columbia, 1969)
- Unchain My Heart (Columbia, 1970)

With Chick Corea

- 1968: Now He Sings, Now He Sobs (Solid State, 1968)
- 1968–1970: Circling In (Blue Note, 1975)
- 1981: Trio Music (ECM, 1982)
- 1984: Trio Music Live in Europe (ECM, 1986)
- 2001: Rendezvous in New York (Stretch, 2003)

With Larry Coryell

- Spaces (Vanguard, 1970) – rec. 1969
- Planet End (Vanguard, 1975) – rec. 1969–1974
- Dedicated to Bill Evans and Scott LaFaro (Jazzpoint, 1987)

With Herbie Mann

- Windows Opened (Atlantic, 1968)
- The Inspiration I Feel (Atlantic, 1968)
- Memphis Underground (Atlantic, 1969)
- Live at the Whisky a Go Go (Atlantic, 1969)
- Stone Flute (Embryo, 1970) – rec. 1969
- Muscle Shoals Nitty Gritty (Embryo, 1970) – rec. 1969
- Memphis Two-Step (Embryo, 1971) – rec. 1970

With Steve Marcus

- The Lord's Prayer (Vortex, 1969)
- Green Line (Nivico, 1970)

With Adam Pierończyk

- Wings (For Tune, 2015)
- Ad-Lib Orbits (PAO, 2017)
- Live at NOSPR (Jazz Sound, 2019)

With Enrico Rava and Franco D'Andrea

- Quatre (Gala, 1989)
- Earthcake (Label Bleu, 1991)

With Terje Rypdal

- Terje Rypdal / Miroslav Vitous / Jack DeJohnette (ECM, 1979)
- To Be Continued (ECM, 1981)
- Trio/Live in Concert (TDK, 2001)[DVD-Video]

With Wayne Shorter

- Super Nova (Blue Note, 1969)
- Moto Grosso Feio (Blue Note, 1974) – rec. 1970

With Joe Zawinul

- Zawinul (Atlantic, 1971) – rec. 1970
- Concerto Retitled (Atlantic, 1976) – compilation

With others

- Alpay, Tango & Latin (Dogan Music, 2001)
- Franco Ambrosetti, Light Breeze (Enja, 1998) – rec. 1997
- Amerie, All I Have (Columbia, 2002) – rec. 2001–2002
- Buck-Tick, Symphonic Buck-Tick in Berlin (Invitation, 1990)
- Donald Byrd, The Creeper (Blue Note, 1981) – rec. 1967
- Mariano Deidda, L'Incapacità di Pensare (Sette Ottavi/Warner, 2005)
- Jack DeJohnette, The DeJohnette Complex (Milestone, 1969) – rec. 1968
- Aydin Esen, Vinnie Colaiuta, Living (Universal/EmArcy, 2001)
- Antonio Farao, Daniel Humair, Takes On Pasolini (CAM Jazz, 2005)
- Stan Getz, The Song Is You (Laserlight, 1996) – rec. 1969
- Laszlo Gardony, The Secret (Antilles/Island, 1988) – rec. 1986
- Jan Garbarek, StAR (ECM, 1991)
- Tim Hardin, Bird on a Wire (Columbia, 1971)
- Jon Hassell, Earthquake Island (Tomato, 1978)
- Roy Haynes, A Life in Time (Dreyfus, 2007)[3CD + DVD-Video] – compilation
- Toshiyuki Honda, Dream (Eastworld, 1983)
- Daniel Humair, Edges (Label Bleu, 1991)
- Vic Juris & John Etheridge, Bohemia (Jazzpoint, 1988)
- Fumio Karashima, Hot Islands (Trio, 1979)
- Anders Koppel, Past Present Future (Cowbell Music, 2017)
- Steve Kuhn, Oceans in the Sky (Owl, 1990)
- Biréli Lagrène & Larry Coryell, And Special Guests (In-akustik, 1986)
- Maria Mena, Mellow (Columbia, 2004)
- Alphonse Mouzon, In Search of a Dream (MPS, 1978)
- Michal Pavlicek, Minotaurus (Panton, 1991)
- Flora Purim, Stories to Tell (Milestone, 1974)
- Fredy Studer, Seven Songs (veraBra, 1991)
- Jasper van 't Hof, Live in Montreux (Pausa, 1980)
- Sadao Watanabe, Round Trip (CBS/Sony, 1970)
- Lenny White, Big City (Nemperor, 1977)
- Janci Körössy, Ale Ne Pro Mne (Supraphon, 1965)
