= Moto Grosso Feio =

Studio album by Wayne Shorter
- Released: August 1974
- Recorded: April 3, 1970, or August 26, 1970
- Studio: A & R, New York City
- Genre: Jazz
- Length: 42:22
- Label: Blue Note; BN-LA014-G
- Producer: Duke Pearson

Wayne Shorter chronology
Second Genesis (1974)	Moto Grosso Feio (1974)	Native Dancer (1975)

Moto Grosso Feio is the thirteenth album by Wayne Shorter, recorded in 1970 but not released on the Blue Note label until 1974. The album features four originals by Shorter and an arrangement of "Vera Cruz" by Milton Nascimento. Some of the musicians include guitarist John McLaughlin, bassist/cellist Ron Carter, bassist Dave Holland, and drummers Jack DeJohnette and Micheline Pelzer.

== Reception ==
The AllMusic review by Scott Yanow stated that "the music (which is influenced by early fusion) has its interesting moments although it often wanders".

Professional ratings
Review scores
Source	Rating
AllMusic	3/5 stars

== Track listing ==
All compositions by Wayne Shorter except where noted.

1. "Moto Grosso Feio" – 12:30
2. "Montezuma" – 7:53
3. "Antigua" – 5:25
4. "Vera Cruz" (Milton Nascimento) – 5:12
5. "Iska" – 11:22

== Personnel ==
- Wayne Shorter — soprano saxophone, tenor saxophone
- John McLaughlin — 12-string guitar
- Chick Corea — marimba, drums, percussion
- Ron Carter — bass, cello
- Dave Holland — acoustic guitar, bass
- Jack DeJohnette — drums, thumb piano
- Miroslav Vitouš — bass (uncredited on album cover but mentioned as part of sessions in liner notes)
- Micheline Pelzer (credited as Michelin Prell) — drums, percussion
