= Stu Goldberg =

American jazz musician

- Born: Stuart Wayne Goldberg; 10 July 1954 (age 72); Malden, Massachusetts, U.S.
- Education: University of Utah (BA)
- Occupation: Jazz keyboardist

Stuart Wayne "Stu" Goldberg (born July 10, 1954 in Malden, Massachusetts) is an American jazz keyboardist.

Goldberg was born in Massachusetts but raised in Seattle, and played with Ray Brown at the Monterey Jazz Festival in 1971. He attended the University of Utah, taking his bachelor's in music in 1974, then relocated to Los Angeles. He played with the Mahavishnu Orchestra in 1975, and subsequently worked in the 1970s with Al Di Meola, Freddie Hubbard, Alphonse Mouzon, Michal Urbaniak, and Miroslav Vitous. He booked a tour of Europe in 1978 as a solo keyboardist, and released several albums under his own name and with Toto Blanke's Electric Circus. Returning to Los Angeles in 1985, he worked extensively in film soundtracks (including with Lalo Schifrin and Ira Newborn) and as a studio musician.

== Discography ==
- Solos-Duos-Trios with L. Subramaniam and Larry Coryell (MPS Records, 1978)
- Fancy Glance with John Lee and Gerry Brown (Sandra Music Productions, 1979)
- Friends with Toto Blanke's Electric Circus (Bacillus Records, 1979)
- Family with Toto Blanke's Electric Circus (Aliso Music, 1980)
- Piru (MPS, 1981)
- Eye of the Beholder (Pausa Records, 1982)
- Live with Palle Danielsson and Jon Christensen (MPS, 1983)
- Going Home (Rhombus Records, 2001)
