= Ann Burton =

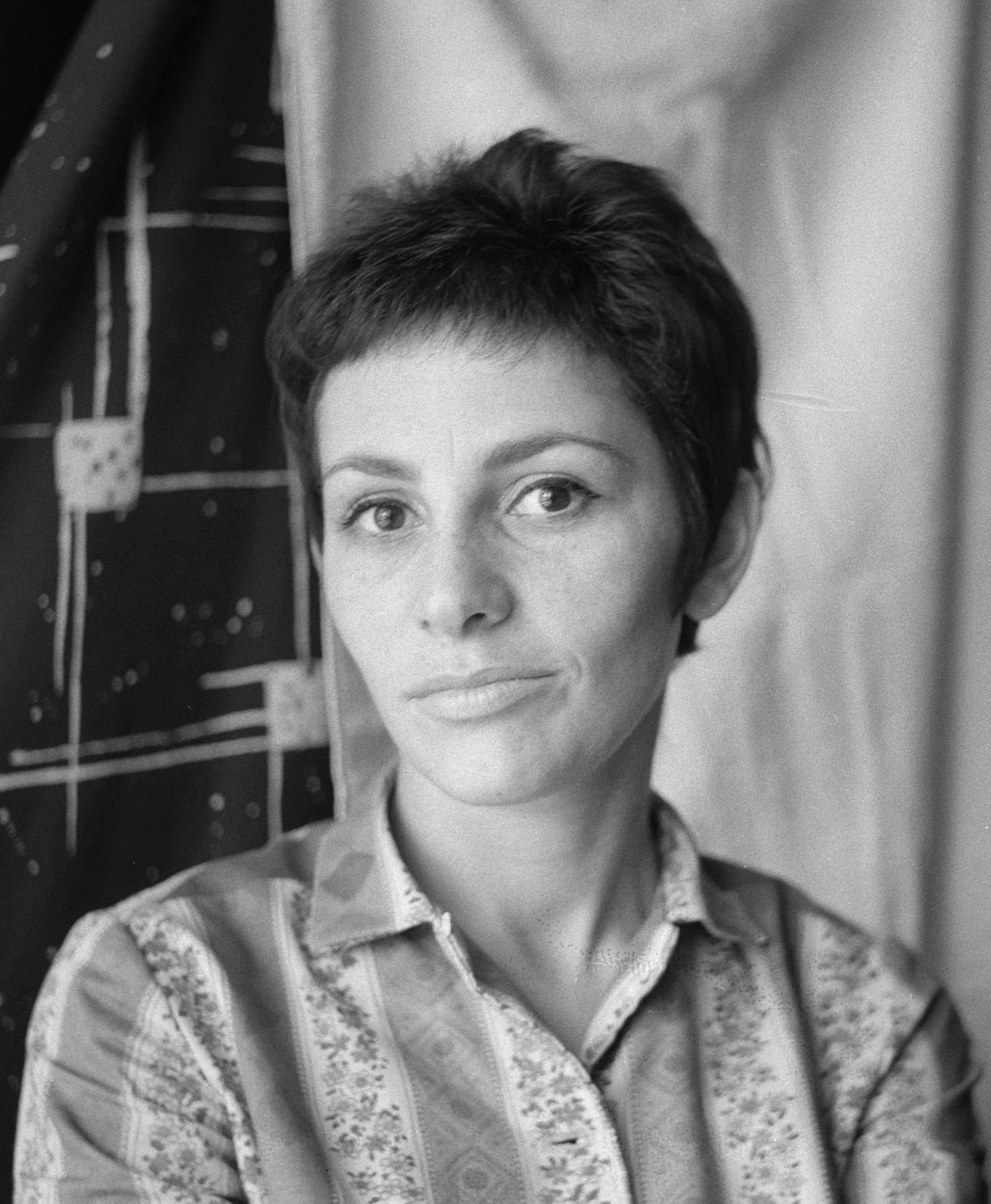
- Ann Burton in 1961

Background information
- Also known as: Johanna de Paauw
- Born: Johanna Rafalowicz; March 4, 1933; Amsterdam, Netherlands
- Died: November 29, 1989 (aged 56) Amsterdam, Netherlands
- Genres: Jazz
- Occupation: Singer
- Years active: 1965–1989
- Website: www.annburton.com

Ann Burton (March 4, 1933 – November 29, 1989) is the pseudonym of Johanna Rafalowicz (between 1938 and 1971: Johanna de Paauw), a Dutch jazz singer.

== Early life ==
In about 1930 the mother of Ann Burton (pseudonym of Johanna Rafalowicz) immigrated from Poland to the Netherlands. Ann was born in Netherlands and when she was 3 years old, in 1933, her mother married a diamond worker.

In 1938 Johanna's surname was changed to her stepfather's and she became Johanna de Paauw, which was her official name until 1971, when she again changed it back to Rafalowicz. During World War II her family faced Jewish persecution under German occupation and she went into hiding while her mother and stepfather survived the Nazi concentration camps.

However, the family became disrupted when her (step) parents were deprived of parental power. Johanna, who had Polish nationality, acquired Dutch nationality in 1957.

Johanna had never had singing lessons, but she had listened to American singers like Doris Day, Jo Stafford, Rosemary Clooney, Ella Fitzgerald and Sarah Vaughan. Later, Billie Holiday and Shirley Horn influenced her. She wanted to get into the music world and so in about 1955 she took the name Ann Burton inspired by the Welsh actor Richard Burton.

== Musical career ==
Ann Burton began her career as singer by a quintet in Luxemburg. She sang with bandleader Johnny Millstonford and performed in clubs with the orchestra of Ted Powder for American soldiers in Germany.

In the summer of 1958 she sang in the quartet of pianist Pia Beck in Scheveningen and in 1960 they toured with saxophonist Piet Noordijk in Spain and Morocco. Back in the Netherlands she sang again in Scheveningen. In 1965, she made an EP for Decca Records with the nl:Frans Elsen Trio. Later she joined Ramses Shaffy's group Shaffy Chantant.

In the late sixties she was noticed by John J. Vis, the director of the record company Artone, and he produced her first album "Blue Burton" in 1967. On this record the trio of Louis van Dijk, de:Jacques Schols and nl:John Engels, supplemented with de:Piet Noordijk, accompanied her. She became popular and the album received an Edison Award in 1969. A few more records in 1969 and 1972 were released in collaboration with John Vis.

In 1973, she toured Japan, where she became the most popular jazz singer, second only to Ella Fitzgerald. She made numerous albums with Masahiko Sato and Ken McCarthy and others. In the late seventies she worked in New York, where she made several albums, some of which were with Grady Tate and Buster Williams. Singer Helen Merrill produced the albums. For "New York State of Mind" Burton also received an Edison award. In the eighties she founded her own record label, Burtone, that produced her albums. In the period 1986–1988 she taught at the Amsterdam Conservatory.

Ann Burton died at the age of 56 due to throat cancer.

== Discography ==
=== Albums ===
Album	Tracks	Tracks
Ann Burton: 1965; EP 7"vinyl Decca BU 700 17	1 Sing a rainbow; 2 The wildest gal in town	3 Miss Otis regrets; 4 Kansas City
Blue Burton: 1967; with The Louis van Dijk Trio; LP Artone MDJ S-3063 Netherlands 1967; LP Avan-Guard BVL 016 Australia 1967; LP CBS S 52791 Netherlands 1970; LP EPIC/Sony ECPL-31 Japan 1972; CD Sony Music Media 496791 2 Netherlands 1999; CD Epic 25-8P-5115 Japan 2005	1 I Can't Give You Anything But Love 4:50; 2 Go Away Little Boy 6:50; 3 He Was Too Good To Me 3:40; 4 But Not For Me 3:40	5 It's Easy To Remember 4:25; 6 You've Changed 6:20; 7 The Good Life 2:30; 8 in the Wee Small Hours of the Morning 3:50; 9 Sunny 3:50
Ballads And Burton: 1969; with The Louis van Dijk Trio; LP CBS S 52807 Netherlands 1971; LP Artone XDJ S-5020 Netherlands 1969; LP Epic 20-3P-127 Japan Unknown	1 A Lovely Way to Spend an Evening 2:25; 2 Try a Little Tenderness 5:25; 3 Bang Bang 3:15; 4 Someone To Watch Over Me 7:10	5 The Shadow of Your Smile 5:10; 6 It Never Entered My Mind 5:25; 7 That Ole Devil Called Love 2:25; 8 Here's That Rainy Day 5:30
Ann Burton Sings For Lovers And Other Strangers: 1972; CBS S 6448	1 A Boy Named Charlie Brown 4:19; 2 Business Goes on as Usual 3:13; 3 Sweet William 2:10; 4 For No One 3:36; 5 "Got to Get You into My Life" 3:00	6 Little Man, You've Had a Busy Day 2:39; 7 Fire and Rain 2:50; 8 My Ship 3:13; 9 For All We Know 2:39; 10 Until It's Time for You to Go 5:08
Misty Burton: 1973 March 16 Tokyo; with The Kenny McCarthy Trio; vinyl, LP	1 Just a Little Lovin'; 2 Oh! Babe, What Would You Say?; 3 Blue Turning Grey Over You; 4 Don't Give Up on Me; 5 When a Woman Loves a Man; 6 You've Got a Friend	7 Flim Flam Man; 8 It's Too Late; 9 Ain't Misbehavin'; 10 Simple Song; 11 My Man; 12 It's a Pity to Say Goodbye
By Myself Alone: 1974; LP Philips 9299 441 Netherlands 1974; LP East Wind EW-7007 Japan 1974; LP Inner City Records IC 6026 US 1979; CD East Wind UCCJ-9004 Japan 2002	1 Come Rain or Come Shine 4:48; 2 Let Me Love You 5:10; 3 May I Come in 2:09; 4 Love Is a Necessary Evil 3:53; 5 Oh, My What a Shame 4:01; 6 By Myself 1:50	7 Yesterday & Yesterdays 2:53; 8 Birthday Song 2:50; 9 I Could Have Told You 808; 10 That Old Feeling 3:07; 11 Travelin' Light 4:59
Ann Burton – Louis van Dijk: 1976; CBS – CDCBS 26611	1 A Lovely Way To Spend An Evening 2:23; 2 Try A Little Tenderness 5:28; 3 Someone To Watch Over Me 7:12; 4 That Ole Devel Called Love 2:27; 5 The Shadow Of Your Smile 5:09; 6 It Never Entered My Mind 5:23; 7 Here's That Rainy Day 5:29	8 Bang Bang 3:16; 9 But Not For Me 3:41; 10 In The Wee Small Hours of the Morning 3:28; 11 I Can't Give You Anything But Love 5:00; 12 You've Changed 5:46; 13 The Good Life 2:37
Burton For Certain: 1977 June 1–2 Tokyo; Trio Records – PAP-25040; Vinyl, LP	1 I Thought About You 3:50; 2 If I Were a Bell 3:49; 3 Desperado 4:25; 4 You and Me Against the World 5:15; 5 Laughing on the Outside 6:27	6 You'd Be So Nice to Come Home To 4:11; 7 I Cover the Waterfront 3:38; 8 Rainy Days and Mondays 4:17; 9 Still Crazy After All These Years 3:32; 10 I Won't Cry Anymore 3:55; 11 Send in the Clowns 4:22
He's Funny That Way: 1977; LP Lob – LDC-1005; Japan	1 Exactly Like You; 2 You'd Be So Nice to Come Home To; 3 He's Funny That Way	4 Lover Come Back to Me; 5 Rainy Days and Mondays; 6 Ain't Misbehavin'
New York State Of Mind: 1979; LP CBS 84281 Netherlands 1980; LP Inner City Records IC 1094 US 1981; CD Tokuma Japan Communications TKCB-70050 Japan 1993	1 New York State of Mind; 2 You Started Something; 3 I Can Dream, Can't I?; 4 All or Nothing at All; 5 Come in From the Rain	6 Tell Me More and More, and Then Some; 7 The Night We Called It a Day; 8 Something So Right; 9 All too Soon; 10 Never Never Land
Some Other Spring: 1980; Tokio, April 26, 1980	1 Dream a Little Dream of Me 2:23; 2 The Very Thought of You 4:42; 3 Baubles, Bangles and Beads 3:28; 4 Thursday's Child 3:38; 5 It's a Pity to Say Goodnight 2:07	6 Skylark 3:50; 7 The Days of Wine and Roses 2:54; 8 What Is There to Say? 2:52; 9 Some Other Spring 3:13; 10 The End of a Love Affair 2:58
Ann Burton Sings...Vol.1: 1980; BURTONE LP BT 001 Producer: Helen Merrill; Vinyl, LP, Album; Netherlands	1 New York State Of Mind; 2 You Started Something; 3 I Can Dream, Can't I; 4 All Or Nothing at All; 5 Come Rain Or Come Shine	6 Tell Me More And More, And Then Some; 7 The Night We Called It A Day; 8 Something So Right; 9 All Too Soon; 10 Never Never Land
Skylark: 1980; LOBSTER CD LFA 3048; Producer: Keichiro Ebihara	1 Skylark 3:59; 2 Days Of Wine And Roses 2:57; 3 What Is There to Stay? 2:52; 4 Some Other Spring 3:21; 5 End of a Love Affair 3:00; 6 Dream a Little Dream of Me 2:31; 7 Very Thoughtful of You 4:53	8 Baubles, Bangles, and Beads 3:38; 9 Thursday's Child 3:46; 10 It's a Pity to Say Good-Night 2:21; 11 Rainy Days and Mondays 3:51; 12 Ain't Misbehaving 4:13; 13 Exactly Like You 3:32; 14 You'd Be So Nice to Come Home To 5:07; 15 He's Funny That Way 5:16
Ann Burton Collage: 1981; vinyl, LP; CBS – 85080 Netherlands	1 A Lovely Way To Spend An Evening 5:25; 2 Try A Little Tenderness 5:25; 3 New York State Of Mind 5:40; 4 In The Wee Small Hours of the Morning 3:50; 5 You Started Something 2:51; 6 The Shadow Of Your Smile 5:10; 7 A Boy Named Charlie Brown 4:19	8 I Can't Give You Anything But Love 4:50; 9 Someone To Watch Over Me 7:10; 10 It Never Entered My Mind 5:25; 11 But Not For Me 3:40; 12 Here's That Rainy Day 5:30; 13 The Good Life 2:30
Sentimental Touch: 1981 London; Albert van Dam; RCA LP TL 70465 en TOKUMA CD TKCB 70048 ('Songbirds'); Producer: Albert van Dam; vinyl, LP	1 Way back Home	
Am I Blue: May 1981; LP, Album Keytone Records KYT 711 Netherlands; CD, Album Keytone Records KYT 711 CD Japan	1 Can't Face the Music 5:00; 2 I'll Be Around 4:06; 3 Did I Remember 4:00; 4 Laughing at Life 4:29; 5 Am I Blue 2:45	6 I Wish on the Moon 5:16; 7 I Don't Want to Cry Any More 5:07; 8 On the Sentimental Side 3:00; 9 I Get Along Without You 5:15
Ann Burton Sings...Vol.2: 1983; LP Vinyl Burtone Records – BT 002; Netherlands|	1 Sooner Or Later; 2 This Is New; 3 Nobody's Heart; 4 What'll Do; 5 I Like You, You're Nice	6 Humpty Dumpty Heart; 7 After You; 8 You Fascinate Me So; 9 It Might As Well Be Spring
It Might As Well Be Love: 1984; LP, Album Turning Point Records TP 30002 Netherlands; LP, Album, Promo Timeless Records (3) RJL-8115 Japan	1 Sooner or Later 3:50; 2 This Is New 2:35; 3 Nobody's Heart 4:45; 4 What'll I Do 1:58; 5 I Like You, You're Nice 3:44	6 Humpty Dumpty Heart 3:28; 7 After You 4:37; 8 You Fascinate Me So 3:19; 9 It Might as Well Be Spring 3:58
Everything Happens: 1988; July 28, 2003	1 I Didn't Know What Time It Was; 2 Everything Happens; 3 Gentleman Friend; 4 Dreamer; 5 It Don't Mean a Thing, He Ain't Got Rhythm; 6 Time Was	7 Again; 8 Nice & Easy; 9 I Want Dance; 10 That's All; 11 Nobody Else But Me; 12 Afterthoughts
Ann Burton – Her American Recordings: 1989 July; BURTONE CD BT 004 Production: RAF Amsterdam; CD	1 Sooner Or Later 3:53; 2 This Is New 2:38; 3 Nobody's Heart 4:48; 4 What'll I Do 2:02; 5 I Like You, You're Nice 3:47; 6 Humpty Dumpty Man 3:33; 7 After You 4:42; 8 You Fascinate Me So 3:22; 9 It Might As Well Be Spring 4:01; 10 New York State Of Mind 5:08	11 You Started Something 2:56; 12 I Can Dream, Can't I 4:22; 13 All Or Nothing at All 4:13; 14 Come in From The Rain 3:42; 15 Tell Me More And More And Then Some 4:02; 16 The Night We Called It A Day 3:36; 17 Something So Right 4:34; 18 All Too Soon 3:36; 19 Never Never Land 4:43
REMEMBER 1966–1988: 2011; MZCF-1235	1 The Wildest Gal in Town; 2 Once; 3 When A Woman Loves A Man; 4 Put on a Happy Face; 5 Blue Turning Grey Over You; 6 But Beautiful; 7 Gypsy in My Soul; 8 I'm A Fool To Want You	9 In The Wee Small Hours in the Morning; 10 Me, Myself And I; 11 The End of a Love Affair; 12 This Is New; 13 Humpty Dumpty Heart; 14 Round About; 15 That Old Devil Called Love; 16 Everything Happens To Me...

== Bibliography ==
- Anneke Muller. Blue Burton. Schoorl: Conserve, 1999. ISBN nummer 90-5429-129-X
