= Pierre Courbois =

Dutch jazz drummer, bandleader, and composer (born 1940)

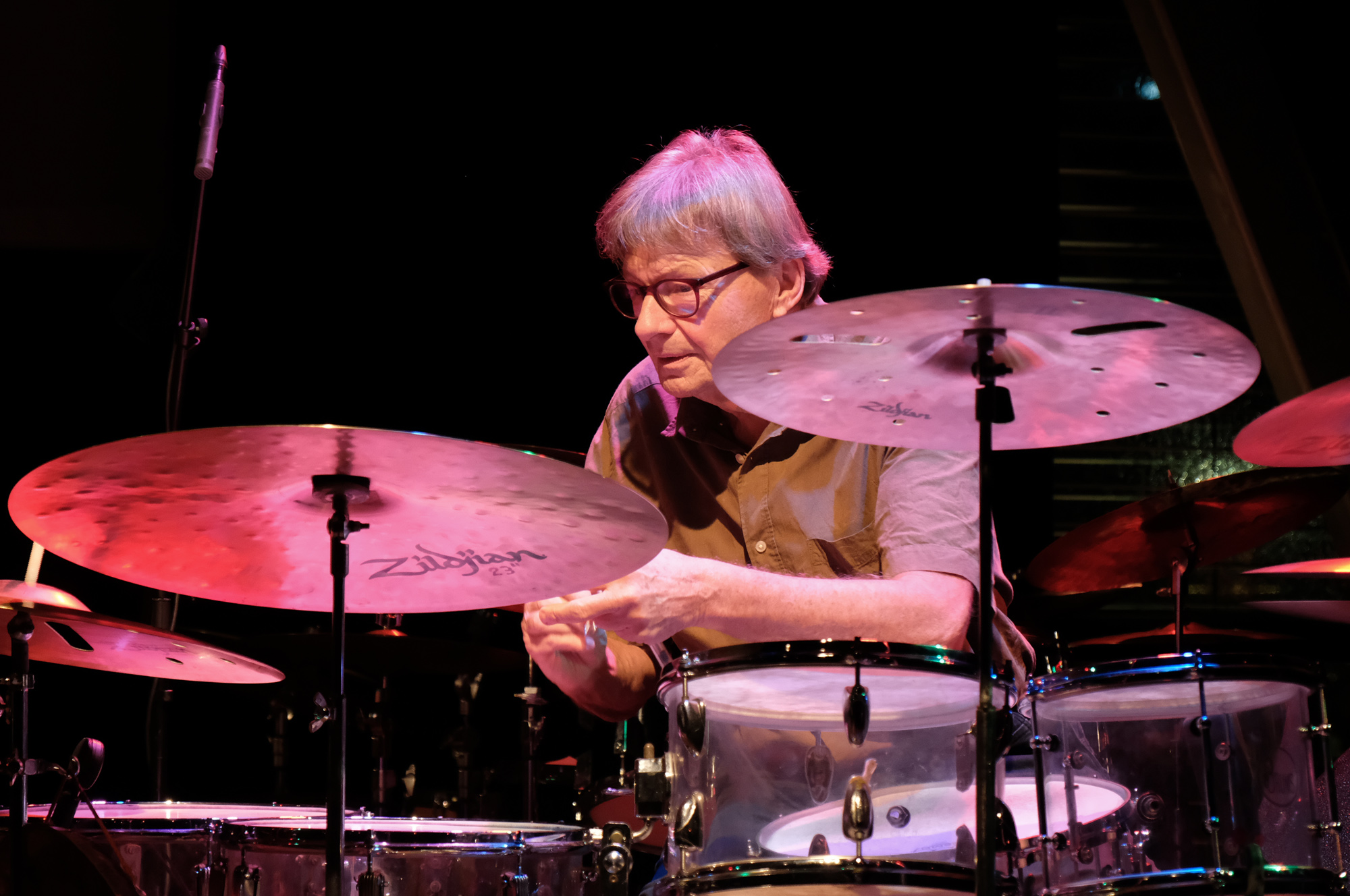

Pierre Courbois (born 23 April 1940 in Nijmegen, Netherlands) is a Dutch jazz drummer, bandleader, and composer.

== Career ==
He is the younger brother of actress Kitty Courbois. After studying percussion at the Hogeschool der Kunsten in Arnhem, Courbois left for Paris, the center of jazz in Europe in the early 1960s. He worked with pianist Kenny Drew, violinist Jean-Luc Ponty, saxophonists Eric Dolphy, Ben Webster, Stan Getz, and Johnny Griffin, and guitarist René Thomas.

Courbois was one of the first musicians in Europe to experiment with free jazz. In 1961 he became the drummer and leader of the (Original Dutch) Free Jazz Quartet. In 1965 he started another group, the Free Music Quintet, composed of international musicians. He also played and recorded with Gunter Hampel's Heartplants Group with Manfred Schoof and Alexander von Schlippenbach.

In 1969 Courbois founded the first European jazz-rock group, Association P.C. This ensemble, winner of the Down Beat poll, existed until 1975 with Toto Blanke, Sigi Busch, different keyboardists, including Jasper van 't Hof, Joachim Kühn and Sigi Kessler. In 1982 he founded New Association with Heribert Wagner, Ben Gerritsen and Ferdi Rikkers. He has also played with the pianists Mal Waldron, and Rein de Graaff, horn players Willem Breuker, Hans Dulfer and Theo Loevendie, and Ali Haurand's European Jazz Quintet with Gerd Dudeck, Leszek Zadlo and Alan Skidmore.

In 1992 Courbois started a quintet and for the first time in his career performed pieces all composed by himself. This ensemble surprised both the critics and the public with a return to the Charles Mingus tradition - thematic, melodic ensemble jazz and an experimentation with linear improvisation. In 1999 he founded the Double Quintet and in 2003 the Five Four Sextet, with Eric Vloeimans, Ilja Reijngoud, Jasper Blom, Paul van Kemenade, and Niko Langenhuijsen.

During the 1994 North Sea Jazz Festival the Bird Award, the highest award in the Dutch Jazz World, was bestowed upon Courbois. Since 2000 he has been a Knight of the Order of Orange-Nassau and in 2008 he received the VPRO / Boy Edgar Award.

== Discography ==
- Perpetuum Mobile with Jasper van 't Hof (Varajazz, 1981)
- Independence (Timeless, 1983)
- Live in Germany (A Records, 1996)
- Reouverture (Challenge, 1997)
- Unsquare Roots (Calibre, 2000)
- Revocation: Live at the Bimhuis (Daybreak, 2007)

With Association

- Earwax (Munich, 1970)
- Sun Rotation (MPS, 1972)
- Rock Around the Cock (MPS, 1973)
- Erna Morena (MPS, 1973)
- Mama Kuku (MPS, 1974)

With New Association

- To Be Continued (BV Haast, 1984)
- Four Wheel Drive (Inak, 1987)

With Compass

- Sanstitre (Traction Avant, 1987)

=== As sideman ===
With Gunter Hampel

- Heartplants (SABA, 1965)
- Music from Europe (ESP Disk, 1967)
- Gunter Hampel Group + Jeanne Lee (WERGO, 1969)
- Legendary: The 27th of May 1997 (Birth, 1998)

With others

- Willem Breuker, Contemporary Jazz from Holland: Litany for the 14th of June 1966 (Relax, 1966)
- Peter Brotzmann, Mayday (Corbett vs. Dempsey, 2010)
- Lol Coxhill, Ear of Beholder (Dandelion, 1971)
- Lol Coxhill, Jasper Van't Hof, Toverbal Sweet (Mushroom, 1972)
- Gerd Dudek, Leszek Zadlo, Alan Skidmore, III (Fusion, 1982)
- J. R. Monterose, Jon Eardley, Rein De Graaff, Body and Soul (Munich, 1970)
- Ramses Shaffy, Sunset Sunkiss (Philips, 1969)
- Mal Waldron, A Little Bit of Miles (Freedom, 1974)
- Mal Waldron, Blues for Lady Day (Black Lion, 1993)

== Electoral history ==
Electoral history of Pierre Courbois
Year	Body	Party	Pos.	Votes	Result		Ref.
Year	Body	Party	Pos.	Votes	Party seats	Individual	Ref.
2023	House of Representatives	Socialist Party	49 (Note: Courbois participated as a lijstduwer.)	102	5 / 150	Lost	
2026	Arnhem Municipal Council	Socialist Party	22	45	2 / 39	Lost	
