= Jean-François Jenny-Clark =

French jazz double-bass player and composer (1944–1998)

Jean-François "J.F." Jenny-Clark (12 July 1944 in Toulouse, France – 6 October 1998 in Paris) was a French double bass player. He was estimated as one of the most important bass players of European jazz.

Together with drummer Aldo Romano he provided the rhythm section for Don Cherry's European quintet of 1965, recorded with Steve Lacy and performed concerts with Keith Jarrett (around 1970) and for Jasper van 't Hof's group Pork Pie (with Charlie Mariano) (around 1975).

As a member of Diego Massons ensemble Musique Vivante he was interpreting contemporary music compositions by John Cage, Luciano Berio, Mauricio Kagel, Karlheinz Stockhausen, Pierre Boulez, or Vinko Globokar.

Together with Albert Mangelsdorff he led the German-French jazz ensemble, 1984 to 1987. Since 1985 Jenny-Clark was mainly working in an acclaimed trio with German pianist Joachim Kühn and Swiss drummer Daniel Humair.

== Discography ==
Title	Artists	Year
Togetherness	Don Cherry with Gato Barbieri	1965
Symphony for Improvisers	Don Cherry	1966
New Feelings	Giorgio Gaslini	1966
Zodiac	Barney Wilen	1966
Le Départ Bande Originale du Film	Krzysztof Komeda	1967
Le Nouveau Jazz	Barney Wilen	1967
Obsession	Gato Barbieri	1967
Sounds of Feeling	Joachim Kühn	1969
Bold Music	Joachim Kühn	1969
Our Meanings and our Feelings	Michel Portal	1969
Aus des sieben Tagen	Karlheinz Stockhausen	1969
Epistrophy	Steve Lacy	1969
Comme à la Radio	Brigitte Fontaine	1969
Paris is Wonderful	Joachim Kühn	1970
Sans Tambours Ni Trompettes	Martial Solal	1970
Orfeo Novo	Egberto Gismonti	1970
The Sun Is Coming Up	Ric Colbeck	1970
Laborintus 2	Luciano Berio	1970
For All It Is	Barre Phillips	1971
Jazzworkshop 1971	Norddeutscher Rundfunk	1971
Last Tango in Paris	Gato Barbieri	1972
Perception and Friends	Perception	1972
Bolivia	Gato Barbieri	1973
Transitory	Pork Pie	1974
Jazz a Confronto 11	Franco Ambrosetti	1974
Black Narcissus	Joe Henderson	1975
Three Originals	Albert Mangelsdorff	1975
Watch Devil Go	Jacques Thollot	1975
Une Bien Curieuse Planète	François Jeanneau	1975
Jazz a Confronto 15	Charlie Mariano	1975
Jazz a Confronto 17 / JAC's Anthology	Ambrosetti, Griffin, Grossman, d'Andrea	1975
Jazz a Confronto 28	Paris Quartet	1975
Ad Lib	Michel Graillier	1976
Sonata Erotica	Jean-Luc Ponty	1976
Lettres d'Amour et de Haine	Benito Merlino	1976
Ephémère	François Jeanneau	1977
Divieto Di Santificazione	Aldo Romano	1977
Invitation	Massimo Urbani	1977
Techniques Douces	François Jeanneau	1977
New Moon (Musica)	Steve Grossman	1978
Enrico Rava Quartet	Enrico Rava	1978
Invitation	Siegfried Kessler	1979
Sunbird	Gordon Beck	1979
Il Piacere	Aldo Romano	1979
Around 6	Kenny Wheeler	1979
Session in Paris, vol.2 - Colour of Dream	Masahiko Togashi	1979
You Better Fly Away	Clarinet Summit	1979
In Paris vol. 2	Chet Baker	1979
Le Voyage	Paul Motian	1979
Soli Solo...Plus	Divers	1979
Electronic Sonata for Souls Loved by Nature	George Russell Sextet	1980
En Direct d'Antibes	René Urtreger	1980
Live in Montreux	Albert Mangelsdorff	1980
Michel Petrucciani	Michel Petrucciani	1981
Stress	Marius Constant	1981
L'ombre Rouge – Bande Originale du Film	Michel Portal	1981
Dreamdrops	Michel Graillier	1982
Easy to Read	Kühn / Humair / Jenny-Clark	1986
Unison	Jean-François Jenny-Clark	1987
Men's Land	Michel Portal	1987
Welcome	Fasoli, Wheeler, Humair, Jenny-Clark	1987
Turbulence	Michel Portal	1987
9.11 pm Town Hall	Portal, Ducret, Kühn etc.	1988
Til C.	Grand Orchestre Bekummernis	1988
Just Friends	Helen Merrill	1989
From Time to Time Free	Kühn / Humair / Jenny-Clark	1989
Live au Thèâtre de la Ville	Kühn / Humair / Jenny-Clark	1989
La Petite Bouteille de Linge	John Greaves	1990
Land	Claudio Fasoli	1990
Destroy	Blue Ensemble	1990
Assolutamente	Jean Schwarz	1990
Years Old	Georges Paczynski	1991
Autumn in Paris	Masahiko Togashi	1991
Sans Titre	Mudai Trio	1992
Ternaire	Friedman, Humair, Jenny-Clark	1992
Carambolage	Kühn / Humair / Jenny-Clark	1992
Euro African Suite	Joachim Kühn and Ray Lema	1992
Domaines	Pierre Boulez	1992
A Winter's Tale	Tony Hymas / Jacques Thollot	1992
Nemo	Rémi Charmasson	1993
Sokoa Tanz	Blue Ensemble	1993
Usual Confusion	Kühn / Humair / Jenny-Clark	1993
The Kühn / Humair / Jenny-Clark Collection	Kühn / Humair / Jenny-Clark	1993
Canto	Jean Schwarz	1993
Open Architecture	Humair, Bergonzi, Jenny-Clark	1993
Seventy	Charlie Mariano	1993
Le Vivre	Nelly Pouget	1993
Any Way	Michel Portal	1993
Surrounded 1964–1987	Daniel Humair	1994
Half a Lifetime	Fredy Studer and Christy Doran	1994
Levin'Song	Paczynski, Levinson, Jenny-Clark	1994
Dernier Carat	Jenny-Clark, Adam, Guédon	1994
Les Jardins du Casino	Harry Beckett	1995
Un Ciel de Traine	Philippe Ducourtioux	1995
Europeana	Mike Gibbs w/ Joachim Kühn	1995
Robert Kaddouch sur France-Musique	Robert Kaddouch	1995
Dolorès	Jean-Louis Murat	1996
Anniversary	Flavio Ambrosetti	1996
Musique de l'Opéra de Quat'Sous	Kühn / Humair / Jenny-Clark	1996
Versions Jane	Jane Birkin	1996
Tomorrowland	Jasper Van't Hof	1996
Quatre Fois Trois	Daniel Humair	1997
Takiya ! Tokaya !	Jean-Marc Padovani	1997
French Touch	Richard Galliano	1998
Triple Entente	Kühn / Humair / Jenny-Clark	1998
Concerts Inédits	Richard Galliano	2000
A Demain	Frédéric Escoffier	2001
Solo	Jean-François Jenny-Clark	2003
