= Jasper van 't Hof =

Dutch jazz pianist and keyboard player

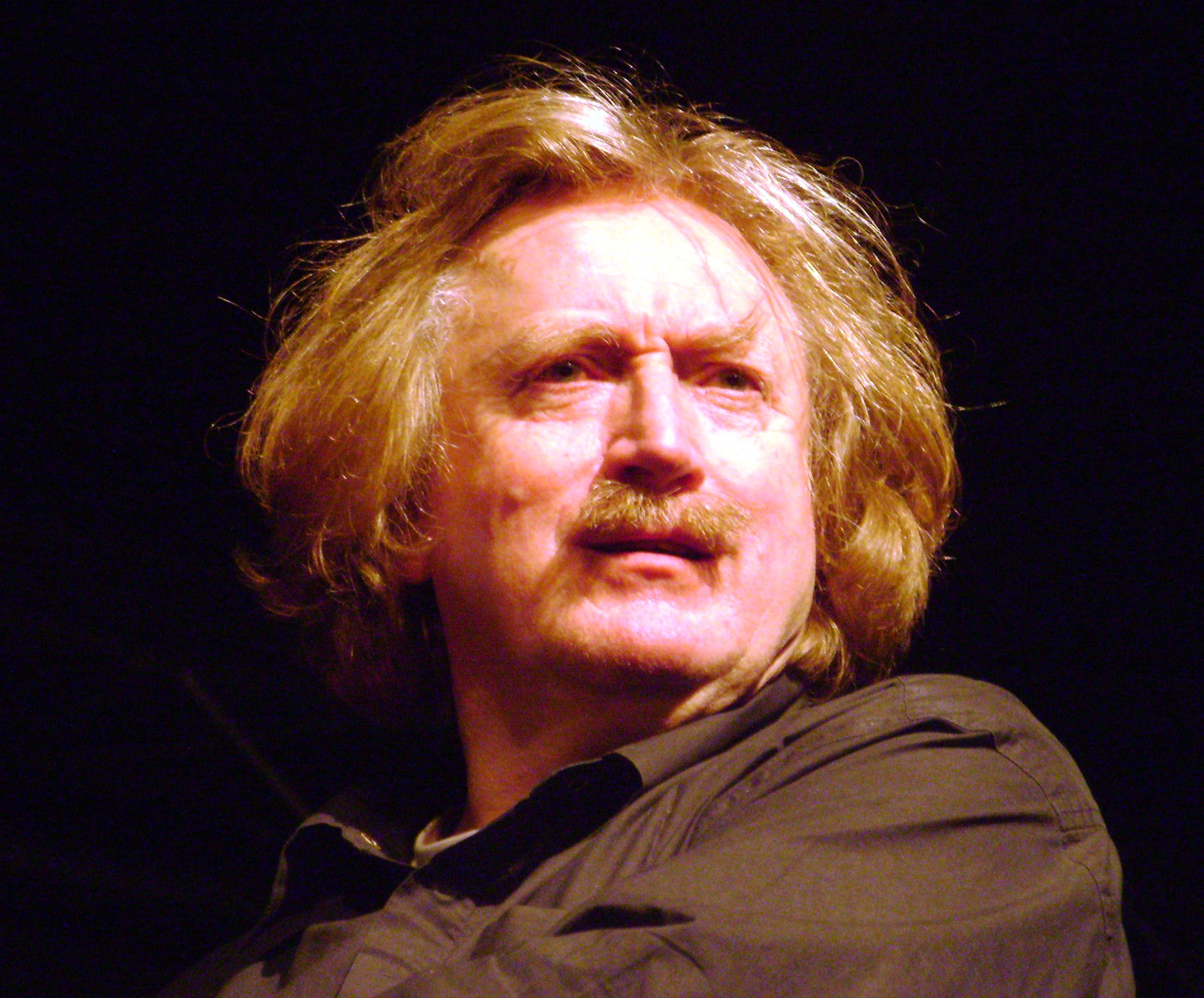
van't Hof (2008)

Jasper van 't Hof (born 30 June 1947) is a Dutch jazz pianist and keyboard player.

Van 't Hof was born in Enschede, Overijssel, Netherlands, and began studying piano at the age of five. He played in jazz bands at school, and by the age of 19 was playing at jazz festivals with drummer Pierre Courbois. In 1969, he became a member of Courbois' early European jazz rock band Association P.C., with German guitarist Toto Blanke. As part of Piano Conclave he played with pianists George Gruntz, Joachim Kühn, Wolfgang Dauner, and Keith Jarrett.

In 1974, he founded Pork Pie and teamed up with Philip Catherine (guitar), Charlie Mariano (saxophone), Aldo Romano (drums), and Jean-François Jenny Clark (bass guitar). He joined the band Eyeball with saxophonist Bob Malach and violinist Zbigniew Seifert. He had two bands: Face to Face with Danish bassist Bo Stief and saxophonist Ernie Watts and Pili Pili, featuring African singer Angelique Kidjo. He played keyboards with Archie Shepp, although he is best known for his solo piano playing.

For All About Jazz, John Kelman wrote: "Transitory's high point is the two-part title track. Orchestral in scope despite limited instrumentation, Van't Hof's strength as a textural player, comfortably blending impressionistic writing with freer concerns, is in full force."

== Discography ==
=== As leader ===
- Eye Ball (Keytone, 1974)
- The Door Is Open (MPS, 1976)
- The Selfkicker (MPS, 1977)
- However (MPS, 1978)
- Flowers Allover (MPS, 1978)
- Fairytale (MPS, 1979)
- The Wink to My Female Slave (Fleet, 1979)
- Live in Montreux (MPS, 1980)
- Visitors (Pop Eye, 1982)
- Balloons (MPS, 1983)
- Pili-Pili (Keytone, 1984)
- Hoomba-Hoomba (Virgin, 1985)
- Jakko (Jaro, 1987)
- Meditation (Keytone, 1987)
- Be in Two Minds (Jaro, 1988)
- Solo Piano (Timeless, 1989)
- Live 88 (Jaro, 1989)
- Hotel Babo (Jaro, 1990)
- Jazzbuhne Berlin '80 (Repertoire, 1990)
- Dinner for Two (MA Music, 1990)
- Blau (ACT, 1992)
- Stolen Moments (Jaro, 1992)
- Get Down (Hill Street, 1992)
- The Prague Concert (P&J Music, 1992)
- At the Concertgebouw (Challenge, 1994)
- Boogaloo (Jaro, 1994)
- Dance Jazz Live 95 (Jaro, 1995)
- Face to Face (Intuition, 1995)
- Blue Corner (ACT, 1996)
- Freezing Screens (Enja, 1996)
- Tomorrowland (Challenge, 1996)
- Nomansland (Jaro, 1997)
- Un Mondo Illusorio (Challenge, 1998)
- Incwadi Yothando (Jaro, 2000)
- Un Incontro Illusorio (Challenge, 2001)
- Brutto Tempo (Intuition, 2001)
- Ballads of Timbuktu (Jaro, 2002)
- Axioma (Jaro, 2003)
- NeverNeverLand (Jaro, 2005)
- The Yellow House (Connecting Cultures, 2006)
- Live at Quasimodo (Jaro, 2007)
- Pseudopodia (In+Out, 2008)
- Pangramm (FMR, 2008)
- Ukuba Noma Unkungabi (Jaro, 2011)
- Whybecause (Hote Marge, 2012)
- OEuvre (Q-rious Music, 2012)
- On the Move (Intuition, 2015)
- No Hard Shoulder (Very Open Jazz, 2016)
- Three of a Kind (Jaro, 2019)

=== As sideman ===
With Charlie Mariano

- Tea for Four (Leo, 1984)
- Plum Island (Mood, 1985)
- Innuendo (Lipstick, 1992)
- The Great Concert (Enja, 2009)

With others

- Uli Beckerhoff, Camporondo (Nabel, 1987)
- Philip Catherine, Sleep My Love (CMP, 1979)
- Pierre Courbois, Perpetuum Mobile (Varajazz, 1981)
- Lol Coxhill, Toverbal (Sweet Mushroom, 1972)
- David Friedman, Birds of a Feather (Traumton, 1999)
- Joachim Kuhn, Solo's and Duo's (Keytone, 1981)
- John Lee, Infinite Jones (Keytone, 1981)
- Heinz Sauer, Europaischer Jazz 2016 (Infraserv Hochst, 2016)
- Heinz Sauer, Hamburg Episode Live at Fabrik (Art of Groove, 2015)
- Sigi Schwab, Total Musik (Keytone, 1982)
- Sigi Schwab, Solo's, Duo's and Trio's (Keytone, 1982)
- Archie Shepp, Mama Rose (SteepleChase, 1982)
- Archie Shepp, The Fifth of May (L+R, 1987)
- Markus Stockhausen, Aqua Sansa (Fran, 1980)
- Kenny Wheeler, Greenhouse Fables (Sentemo, 1992)
- Jan Akkerman, Pleasure Point (WEA, 1982)
