= Impressions of New York =

Studio album by Rolf Kühn and Joachim Kühn
- Released: 1967
- Recorded: 1967
- Genre: Jazz
- Length: 33:05
- Label: Impulse!
- Producer: Bob Thiele

Rolf Kühn chronology
Re-Union in Berlin (1965)	Impressions of New York (1967)	Monday Morning (1968)

Impressions of New York is an album by German jazz clarinetist Rolf Kühn and his brother, pianist Joachim Kühn, featuring performances recorded in 1967 for the Impulse! label.

== Reception ==
The Allmusic review by Scott Yanow stated: "The music flows with a strong momentum, never losing one's interest. Rolf Kuhn easily keeps up with his younger sidemen, and the overall results feature strong development and some surprises. Recommended".

Professional ratings
Review scores
Source	Rating
Allmusic	4.5/5 stars

== Track listing ==
All compositions by Rolf Kühn

1. "Impressions Of New York - I: Arrival / The Saddest Day / Reality" - 17:50
2. "Impressions Of New York - II: Predictions" - 15:15

- Recorded in New York City in 1967

== Personnel ==
- Rolf Kühn – clarinet
- Joachim Kühn – piano
- Jimmy Garrison – double bass
- Aldo Romano – drums
