= Estate (album) =

Studio album by Michel Petrucciani
- Released: 1982
- Recorded: March / April / May 1982
- Genre: Jazz
- Label: IRD
- Producer: Maurizio Giammarco, Frederico Roa, Amedeo Sorrentino

Professional ratings
Review scores
Source	Rating
AllMusic	3/5 stars

Estate is an album by Michel Petrucciani. It was recorded in the Forum Recording Studio, Rome during the spring of 1982. The title is the Italian word for "summer", pronounced [eˈstaːtɛ].

== Recording and music ==
Pianist Petrucciani recorded the album at the age of 19, with bassist Furio Di Castri and drummer Aldo Romano. Some of the tracks are Petrucciani compositions.

== Reception ==
The AllMusic reviewer concluded: "Even though this can't be considered an essential release for Michel Petrucciani fans (especially with its brief playing time of under 35 minutes), it is an enjoyable session."

== Track listing ==
1. "Pasolini" (Aldo Romano) – 5:26
2. "Very Early" (Bill Evans) – 4:52
3. "Estate" (Bruno Martino) – 5:48
4. "Maybe Yes" (Michel Petrucciani) – 3:46
5. "I Just Say Hello" (Michel Petrucciani) – 6:18
6. "Tone Poem" (Charles Lloyd) – 4:08
7. "Samba Des Prophetes" (Aldo Romano/C. Nougaro) – 8:54

== Personnel ==
- Michel Petrucciani – piano
- Furio Di Castri – bass
- Aldo Romano – drums
