= Uli Beckerhoff =

German jazz composer, trumpeter, and academic

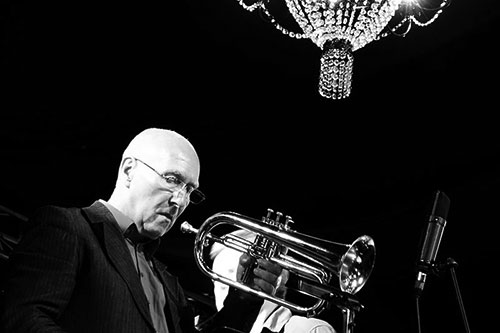
- Beckerhoff at Aarhus Jazzfestival, Denmark in 2015

Background information
- Birth name: Ulrich Beckerhoff
- Born: 6 December 1947 (age 77); Münster, North Rhine-Westphalia, Germany
- Genres: Jazz
- Occupation(s): Musician, composer, academic
- Instrument(s): Trumpet, Flugelhorn
- Website: ulrich-beckerhoff-jazz.com

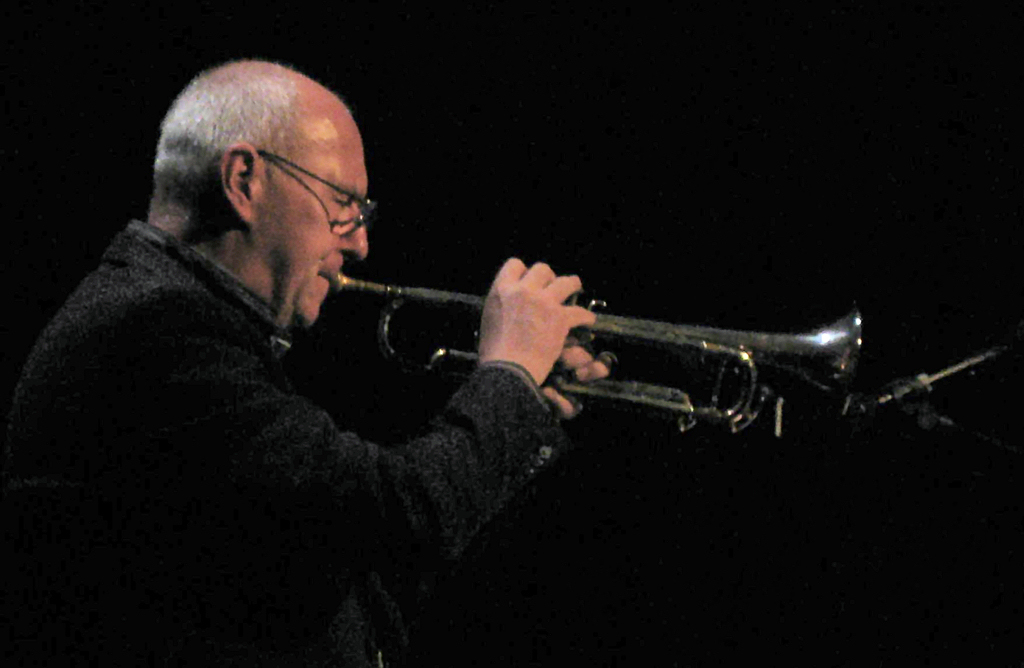
Uli Beckerhoff (2009)

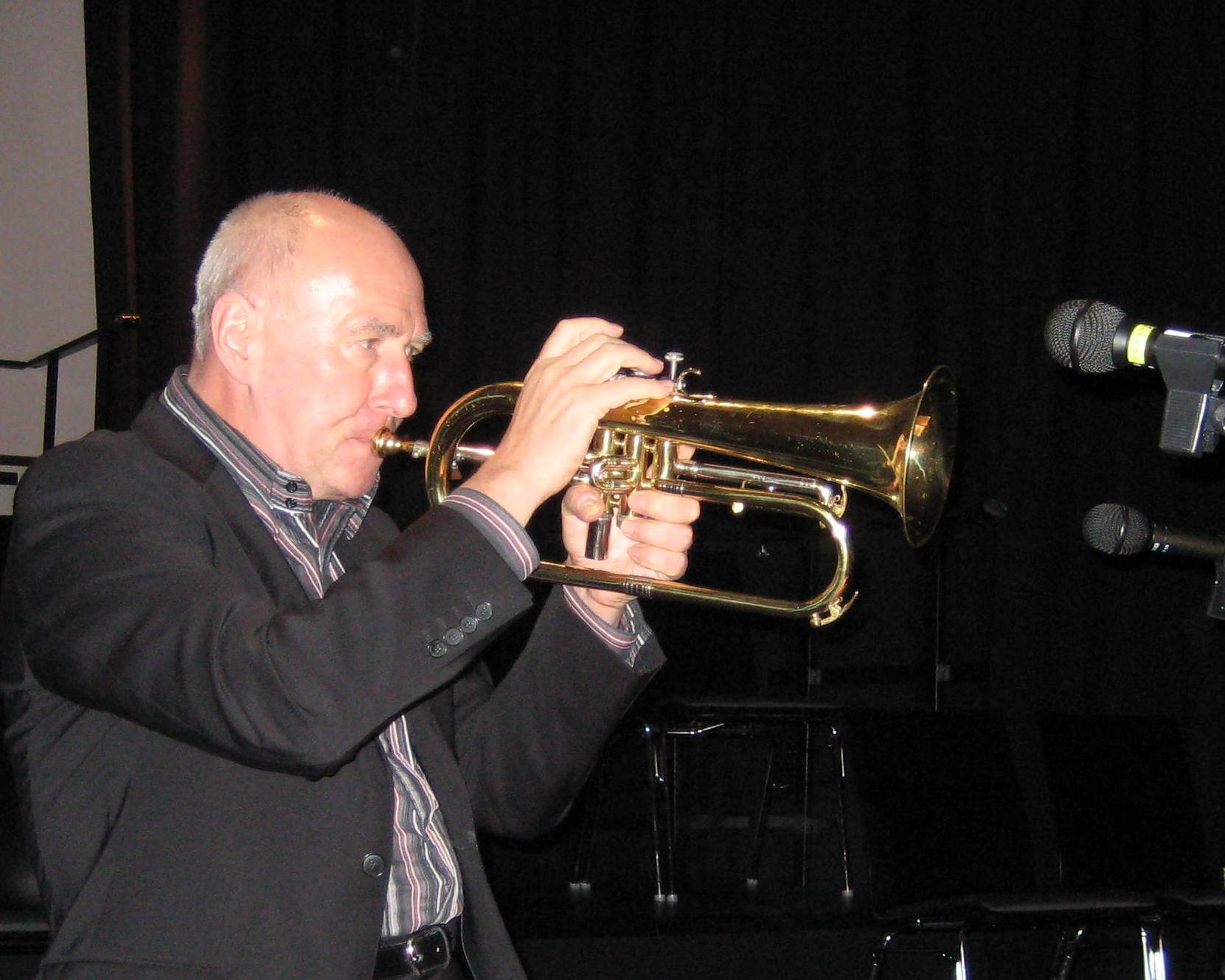
Uli Beckerhoff in Bremen, 9 May 2009

Ulrich (Uli) Beckerhoff (born 6 December 1947) is a German jazz composer, trumpeter, and academic. He was born in Münster.

Beckerhoff led the Uli Beckerhoff Trio with Jasper van 't Hof and John Stanley Marshall as the other two members.

Beckerhoff teaches at the Folkwang University of the Arts in Essen.

== Discography ==
=== As leader or co-leader ===
- Dedication (Fusion, 1981)
- Camporondo (Nabel, 1986) with Jasper van 't Hof, John Marshall
- Secret Obsession (Nabel, 1991) with John Abercrombie, Arild Andersen, John Marshall
- Private Life (Nabel, 1993)
- Das Geheimnis - Secret Of Love (Original Motion Picture Soundtrack of Secret of Love; Nabel, 1997)
- Cinema (Berthold Records, 2012) with Michael Berger, Stefan Ulrich
- Heroes (Dot Time Records, 2015)
- Diversity (Dot Time, 2018)
