= Ten Tales =

Studio album by Joe Lovano, Aldo Romano
- Released: 1990
- Recorded: May 8, 1989
- Studio: Armada Studio, Paris
- Genre: Jazz
- Length: 46:54
- Label: Owl Records
- Producer: Joe Lovano

Joe Lovano chronology
Worlds (1989)	Ten Tales (1990)	Landmarks (Joe Lovano album) (1990)

Professional ratings
Review scores
Source	Rating
AllMusic	3/5 stars
The Encyclopedia of Popular Music	4/5 stars
The Penguin Guide to Jazz	3/4 stars

Ten Tales is a studio album by American jazz saxophonist Joe Lovano and French jazz drummer Aldo Romano. The album was released in 1990, and consists of 10 original instrumental compositions recorded in Paris in 1989 plus jazz standard "Autumn in New York" composed by Vernon Duke.

== Track listing ==
No.	Title	Writer(s)	Length
1.	"Remanence"	Lovano, Romano	4:15
2.	"Dragons Are"	Lovano, Romano	3:18
3.	"Yellow Shadow"	Lovano, Romano	4:23
4.	"Moon Moth"	Lovano, Romano	3:25
5.	"Rain Season"	Lovano, Romano	4:05
6.	"Eternal Youth"	Lovano, Romano	4:35
7.	"Monologue for Two"	Lovano, Romano	5:46
8.	"Return Match"	Lovano, Romano	4:11
9.	"Sediments"	Lovano, Romano	3:36
10.	"Koua 1"	Lovano, Romano	3:08
11.	"Autumn in New York"	Vernon Duke	6:30
Total length:			46:54

== Personnel ==
Musicians

- Joe Lovano – producer, saxophones
- Aldo Romano – drums, photography, producer

Production

- Bernard Amiard – art direction, design
- Pascal Bodin – preparation for release
- Philippe Carles – liner notes
- Christof Déjan – engineer
- Jean-Marie Guérin – engineer
- Marc Le Hene – engineer
- Francois LeMaire – executive producer
- Christian Orsini – mastering
- Patxi – adaptation
- Jean-Jacques Pussiau – executive producer
- Patrick Saunders – translation
