= Gerry Brown (drummer) =

American jazz drummer

Gerry Brown (born November 9, 1951) is an American jazz drummer.

== Life ==
Brown was born in Philadelphia, Pennsylvania, United States. He began playing the drums at the age of five. He played with soul groups and played in high school with bassist John Lee, with whom he attended music academy in 1970. In 1971, he moved to New York, where he played for Lionel Hampton. In 1972 he moved to the Netherlands with Lee to join Chris Hinze's rock jazz group. With bassist John Lee as co-leader, he recorded a series of albums in the 1970s. Alongside Lee, he also worked for Jasper van 't Hof, Toto Blanke, Charlie Mariano, Eef Albers and Gary Bartz in the mid-1970s. Subsequently, they were members of Larry Coryell's The Eleventh House for two years; Brown also played for Stanley Clarke and Chick Corea. In 1979, he accompanied Didier Lockwood at the Montreux Jazz Festival.

Brown settled in Berlin for some time in 1982 and worked with George Gruntz, with Joachim Kühn, and with Chris Beckers, but also with Herb Geller, Anne Haigis and with Kraan until he returned to the United States. In 1986, he succeeded Billy Cobham in Consortium. For 14 years, he performed with Stevie Wonder (1992-2004). Since 2000, he has been the drummer for Diana Ross.

Brown also worked as a sideman on stage and on recordings, including ones with George Benson, Michał Urbaniak, Urszula Dudziak, Marcus Miller, Lionel Richie, Sonny Fortune, Alphonso Johnson, Roberta Flack, Joe Sample, Tom Harrell, Dave Samuels, Chuck Loeb, The George Gruntz Concert Jazz Band, the NDR Bigband (The Spirit of Jimi Hendrix) and Phil Collins. With bassist Nathan Watts, he recorded the instructional video R&B Drumming - Featuring Gerry Brown and his Motown Sound.

== Discography ==
- Infinite Jones (with John Lee, Chris Hinze, Gary Bartz) (Keytone, 1973; reissued on CD as Bamboo Madness)
- Mission Suite (with Chris Hinze, John Lee, Rob v/d Broek, Sigi Schwab)(Keytone, 1973)
- Mango Sunrise (with John Lee) (Blue Note, 1975)
- Still Can't Say Enough (with John Lee) (Blue Note, 1976)
- Medusa (with John Lee) (Columbia, 1977)
- Bamboo Magic (with Chris Hinze, John Lee, John Turner, Stefan Dietz, Philip Catherine, Reggie Lucas, Rob Franken, James Batton, Mtume, Sammy Figueroa, Randy Brecker, Michael Brecker) (Keytone 1978)
- Chaser (with John Lee) (Columbia, 1979)
- Brothers (with John Lee, Eef Albers, Darryl Thompson) (Mood Records, 1981)

With Return to Forever

- Musicmagic
- Live

== Bibliography ==
- Martin Kunzler. Jazz-Lexikon. Vol. 1: A–L (= rororo-Sachbuch. Bd. 16512). 2nd edition. Rowohlt (Reinbek bei Hamburg, 2004). ISBN 3-499-16512-0.
