= Chris Hinze =

Dutch flautist

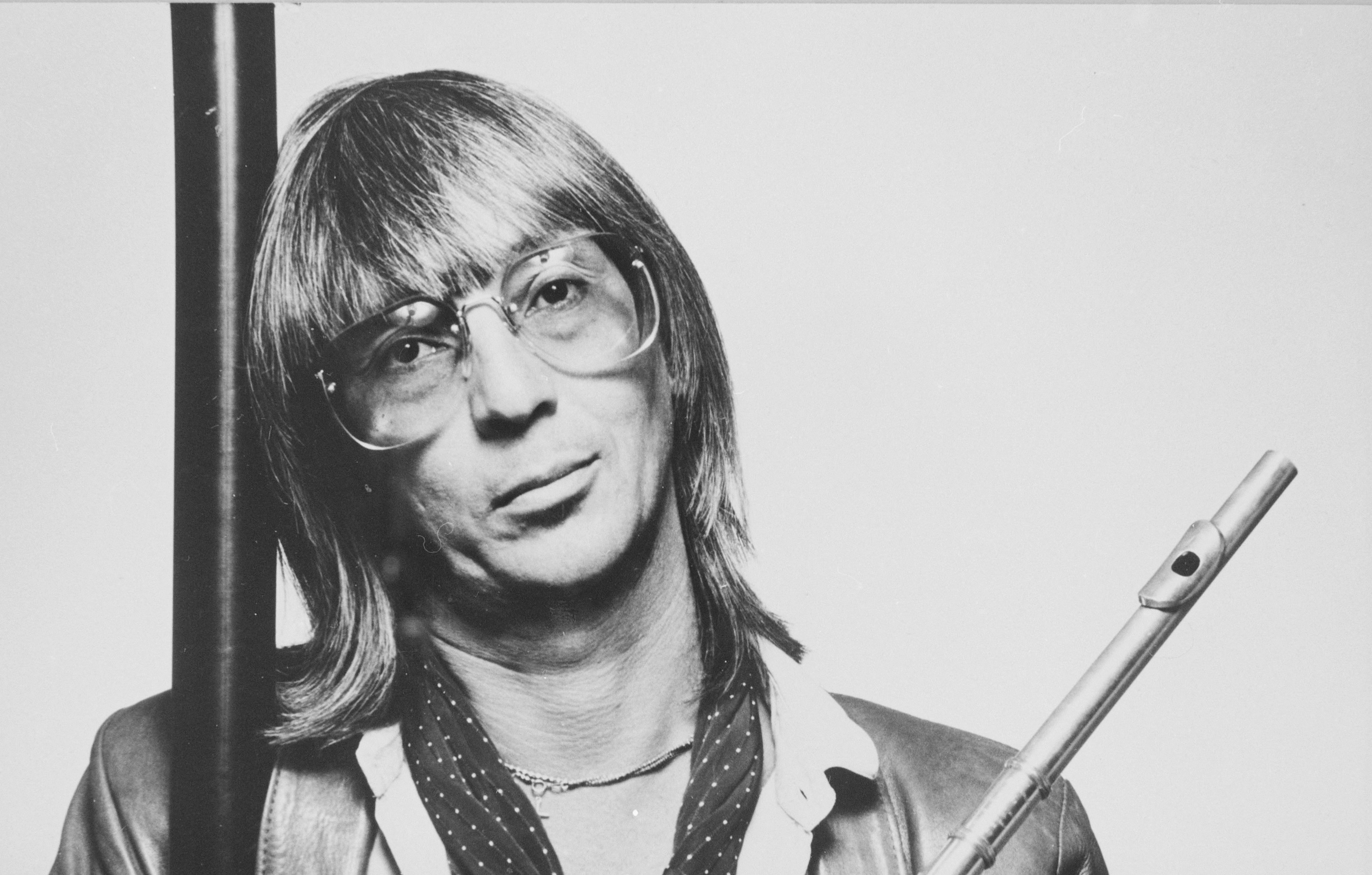
Chris Hinze (1982)

Christiaan Herbert "Chris" Hinze (born June 30, 1938, Hilversum, Netherlands) is a Dutch jazz and New age flautist.

== Life and work ==
Hinze initially performed publicly as a pianist until the mid-1960s, when he began studying flute at the Royal Conservatory of The Hague and then at Berklee College of Music. As a pianist, he played with Boy Edgar until 1966, but by 1967 was playing flute professionally with the bassist Dick van der Capellen. His first releases as a leader were issued in 1969, and in 1970, Hinze was awarded the Best Soloist prize at the Montreux Jazz Festival.

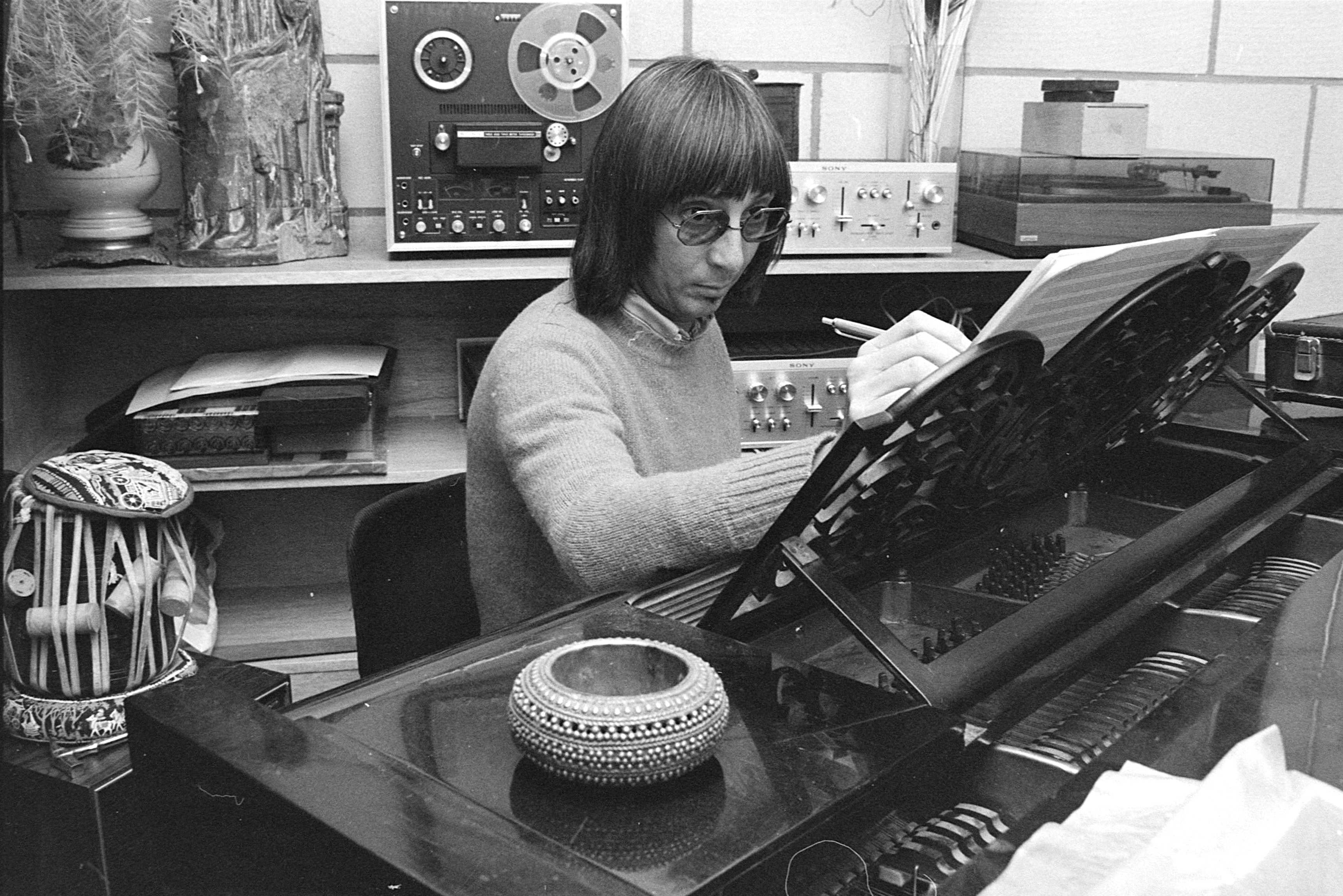
Chris Hinze in The Hague, 1977

In the 1970s, he formed his own ensemble, the Chris Hinze Combination, which included players such as Gerry Brown and John Lee, and which saw some success with arrangements of Baroque music in a jazz setting. He also founded the record label Keytone Records in the mid-1970s.

In the 1980s, Hinze played for several years in a duo with Sigi Schwab and continued touring with a new version of his Combination. He began studying the music of Tibet and South Asia in the middle of the decade, forming a world music ensemble which shifted toward more New age and electronic music styles rather than jazz.

== Discography ==
=== As leader ===
- Telemann My Way (CBS, 1969)
- Vivat Vivaldi! (CBS, 1970)
- Stoned Flute (CBS, 1970)
- Live at Montreux (CBS, 1971)
- Virgin Sacrifice (CBS, 1972)
- Who Can See the Shadow of the Sun (CBS, 1972)
- Hinze Plays Bacharach (CBS, 1973)
- Mission Suite (MPS/BASF, 1973)
- Sketches On Bach (CBS, 1974)
- Sister Slick (CBS, 1974)
- Variations On Bach (CBS, 1976)
- Bamboo Magic (Atlantic, 1978)
- Wide and Blue (Musicians, 1978)
- Summer Dance Live at Montreux Vol. II (Keytone, 1978)
- Impressies (CBS, 1979)
- Live at the Northsea Jazz Festival (Keytone, 1980)
- Flute and Mantras (Keytone, 1980)
- Barocco Con Fuoco (Ariola, 1981)
- Bamboo Reggae (Keytone, 1981)
- Backstage (Melosmusik, 1982)
- India Chintan (Keytone, 1983)
- Mirror of Dreams (Keytone, 1983)
- New Age Meditation Flute and Mantras Vol. 2 (Keytone, 1984)
- Saliah (Keytone, 1984)
- Meditation and Mantras (Keytone, 1986)
- Nazali (Keytone, 1986)
- Chelsea Bridge (Keytone, 1987)
- The Hunter (CBS, 1987)
- Inner Reflections (Keytone, 1989)
- China Dream (Keytone, 1990)
- African Dream (Keytone, 1991)
- Music for Relaxation (Keytone, 1992)
- Passage (Keytone, 1992)
- Princess of the Sea (Keytone, 1993)
- Tibet Impressions Featuring Tsurphu Home of the Karmapas (Keytone, 1994)
- Namaskar (Keytone, 1994)
- Senang (Keytone, 1996)
- Highlights (Keytone, 1996)
- Tibet Impressions Volume II (Music Tibet, 1997)
- Zen Silence (Keytone, 1998)
- Zen & the Art of Dance and Meditation (Keytone, 1998)
- Peaceful Mind - Music For Inner Balance (MasterTone, 1998)
- Power of Mind (MasterTone, 1999)
- Zen The Fire Within, 2001
- Akar Akar (Keytone, 2002)
- Live in Concert (Keytone, 2008)

=== As sideman ===
- Rob de Nijs, Chansons (EMI, 2008)
- Joachim Kuhn & Sigi Schwab, Solo's and Duo's (Keytone, 1981)
- John Lee & Gerry Brown, Infinite Jones (Keytone, 1974)
- Charlie Mariano, Charlie Mariano with the Chris Hinze Combination (Intercord, 1973)
- Charlie Mariano, Cascade (Keytone, 1974)
- Sigi Schwab, Guitarissimo (Nature, 1978)
- Sigi Schwab, Total Musik (Keytone, 1982)
- Sigi Schwab, Solo's Duo's and Trio's (Keytone, 1982)
- Zbigniew Seifert, Zbigniew Seifert (Capitol, 1977)
- Sly & Robbie, Hot Dub (Keytone, 1984)
- Jeremy Steig & James Moody, Flute Summit (Atlantic, 1973)
- Toots Thielemans & Philip Catherine, Toots Thielemans/Philip Catherine & Friends (Keytone, 1974)
- Toots Thielemans & Philip Catherine, Two Generations (Limetree, 1996)
- Rick van der Linden, Solo (Keytone, 1981)
- Louis van Dyke & Thijs van Leer, Metamorphose (CBS, 1972)
- Laurens van Rooyen, Silly Symphony (CBS, 1979)

== Bibliography ==
- Wim van Eyle, "Chris Hinze". The New Grove Dictionary of Jazz. 2nd edition, ed. Barry Kernfeld.
