= John Lee (bassist) =

American bassist

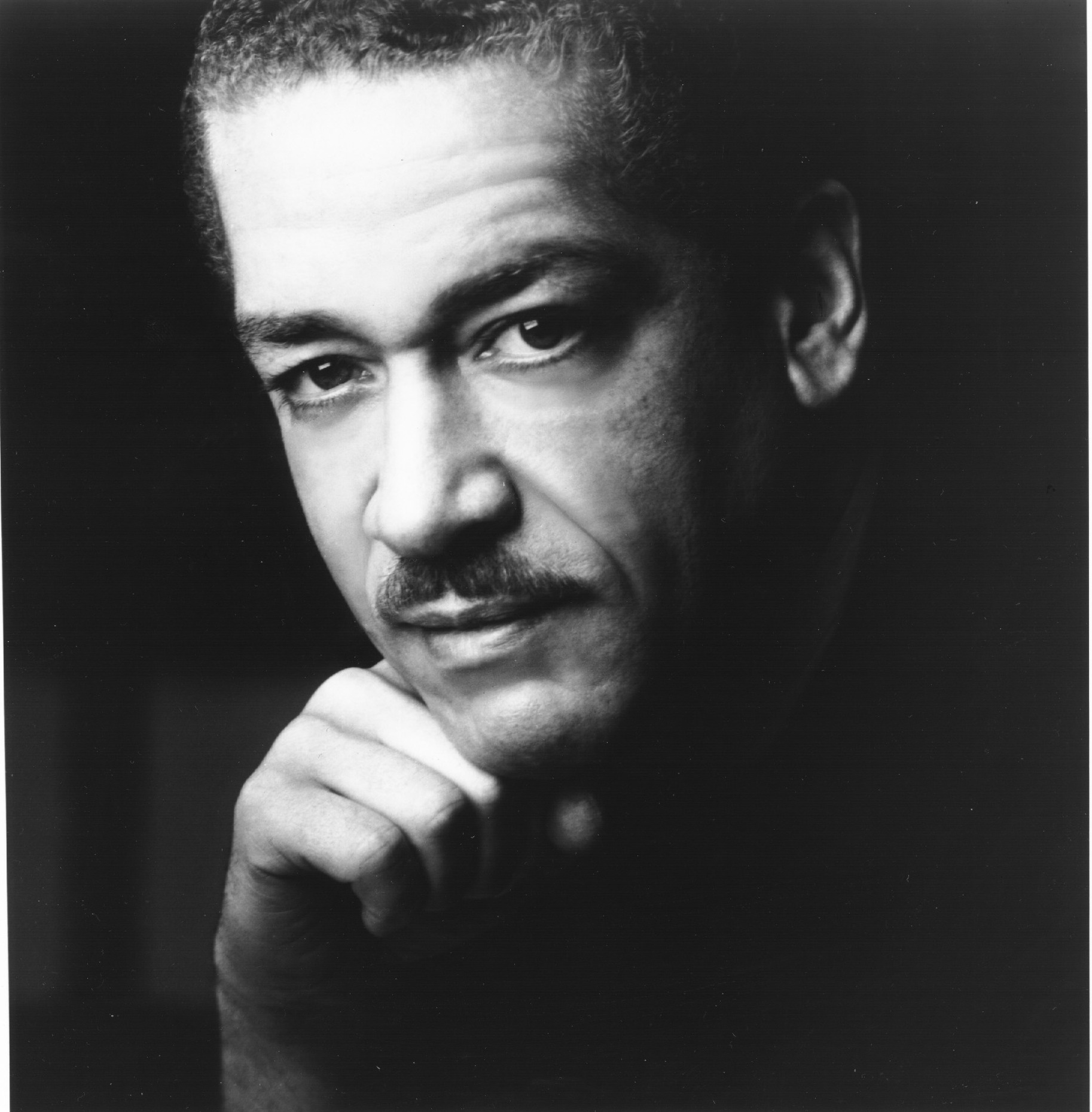
Lee in 2014

John Lee (born June 28, 1952, in Boston, Massachusetts, United States) is an American bassist, Grammy winning record producer and audio engineer.

As a bassist, Lee's career, starting in 1970, includes work with Dizzy Gillespie, Max Roach, Sonny Rollins, McCoy Tyner, James Moody, Jimmy Heath, Joe Henderson, Larry Coryell, Paquito D'Rivera, Gregory Hines, Aretha Franklin, Claudio Roditi, Joachim Kühn and Philip Catherine.

As a producer Lee has produced over 60 albums and CDs, and as a recording engineer he has recorded and mixed over 100 albums and CDs.

== Life and career ==
John Gregory Lee is the son of an African Methodist Episcopal (A.M.E.) minister, Rev. John W. Lee, and Harriet Holland Lee, who was a career social worker. He grew up in Greenwich, Connecticut, Amityville, New York, and Philadelphia, Pennsylvania. John began String Bass lessons in 1962 with Carolyn Lush. At Philadelphia's Overbrook High School, John met drummer Gerry Brown, with whom he also studied with at the Philadelphia Musical Academy (which is now the University of the Arts) from 1970 to 1972. In 1971 Lee also began performing with Carlos Garnett and Joe Henderson, and toured with Max Roach thru the spring of 1972 while still a student in Philadelphia. In August 1972 he and Brown relocated to Europe, with Den Haag, Holland as their base. Together they toured Europe and recorded in bands led by Chris Hinze, Charlie Mariano, Philip Catherine, Joachim Kühn, and Jasper Van't Hof. Lee moved to New York City in October 1974 and worked with Joe Henderson, Lonnie Liston Smith, and Norman Connors until joining The Eleventh House with Larry Coryell in December 1974. In 1975 John Lee and Gerry Brown signed a recording contract with Blue Note Records and formed a working band of their own. In 1977 they moved over to Columbia Records. Lee also began producing records in 1977. From 1982 to 1984, Lee worked with McCoy Tyner. In July 1984 Lee became Dizzy Gillespie’s bassist, touring and recording with Dizzy's Quintet, his Big Band, his Grammy winning “United Nation Orchestra”, and the “Back to the Future Band” that Dizzy co-lead with Miriam Makeba until January 1993 when Makeba died.

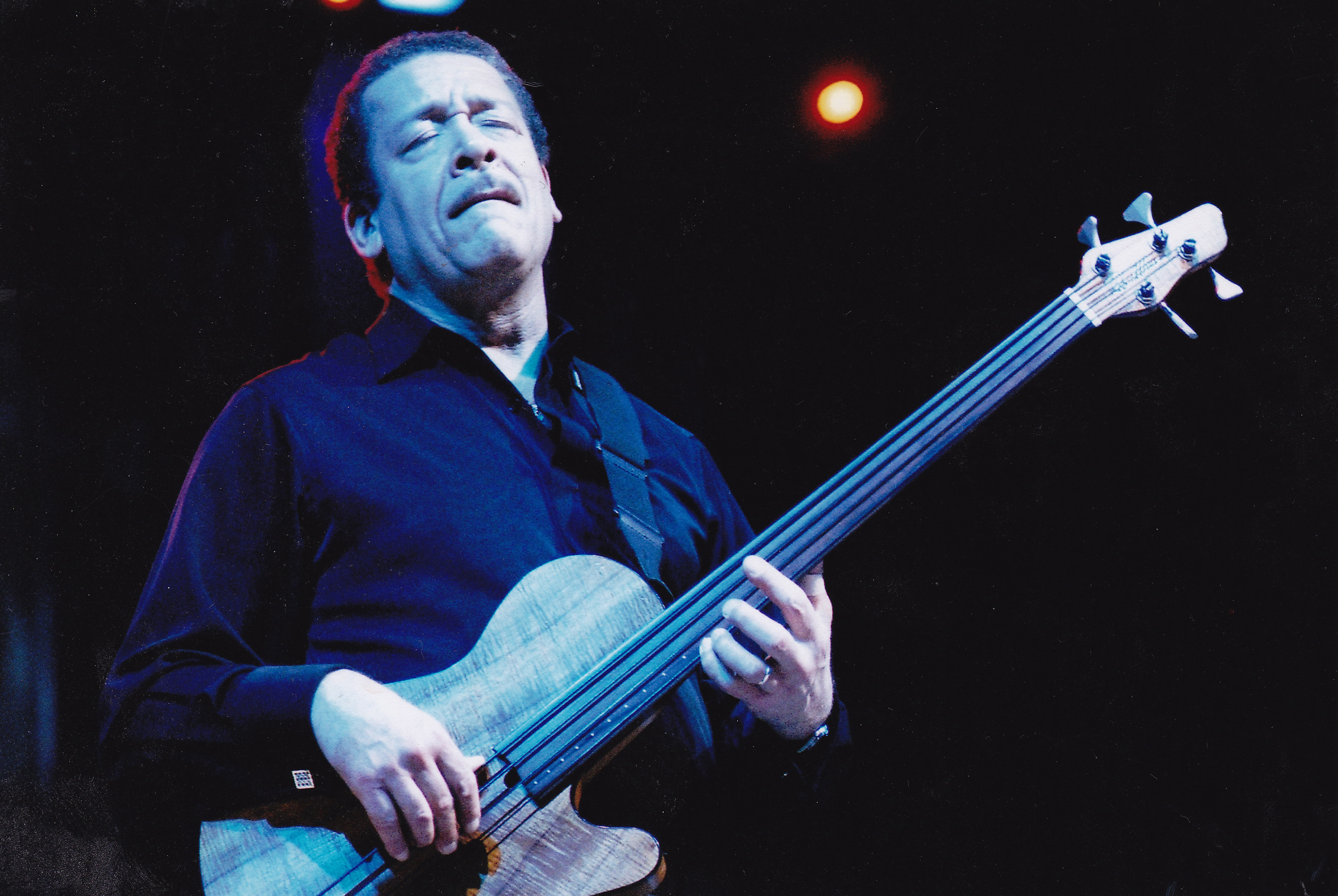
Lee at the North Sea Jazz Festival, 2014

Lee has performed at concert halls and jazz clubs in over 100 countries around the world. He has also toured in the bands of Sonny Rollins, James Moody, Aretha Franklin, Jimmy Heath, Pharoah Sanders, Jackie McLean, Gary Bartz, Gregory Hines, Hank Jones, Walter Davis Jr., Wolfgang Lackerschmid, Alphonse Mouzon, Claudio Roditi, Jon Faddis, Slide Hampton, Roy Hargrove, and Roberta Gambarini. Lee was also a founding member of “The Fantasy Band”’(1993-1996) with Chuck Loeb, Marion Meadows, and Dave Samuels. In 1996, at the bequest of Dizzy's wife Lorraine Gillespie and the Dizzy Gillespie Estate, Lee became the director and bassist of the Dizzy Gillespie Alumni All-Stars as well as the Dizzy Gillespie All-Star Big Band, and the Dizzy Gillespie Afro-Cuban Experience. They have recorded five albums and toured extensively around the world.

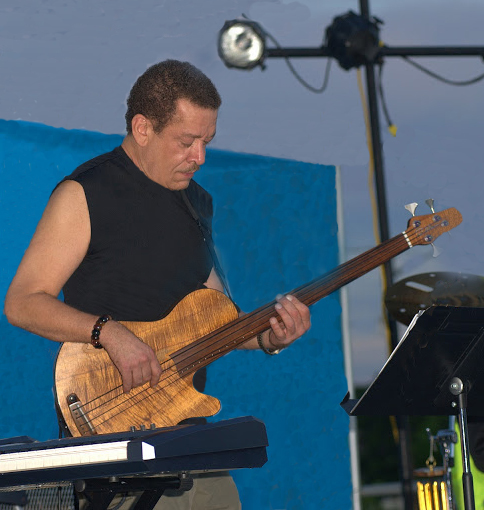

In 2009 John Lee co-founded the jazz recording label JLP (Jazz Legacy Productions), with partner Lisa Broderick.

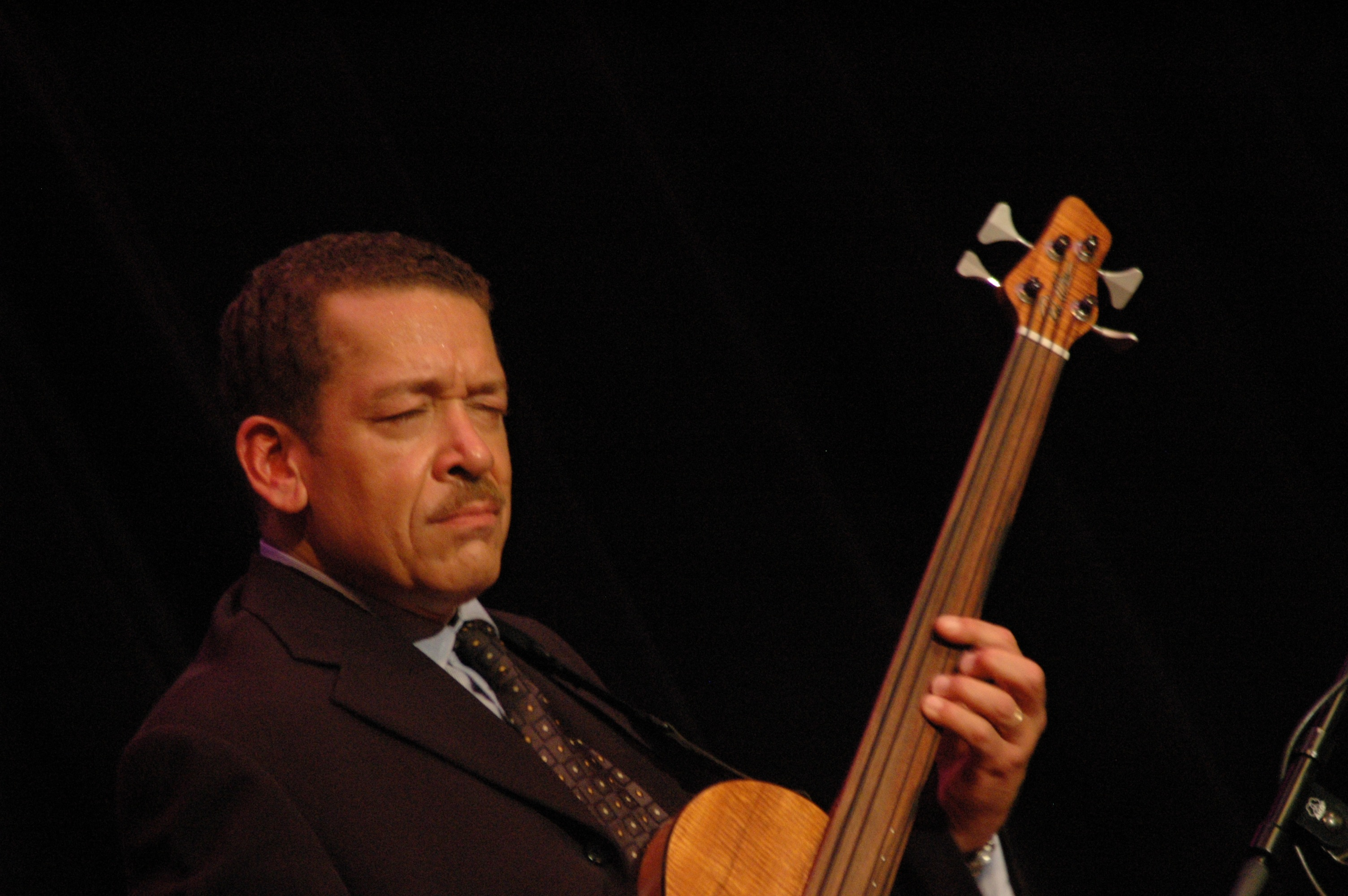

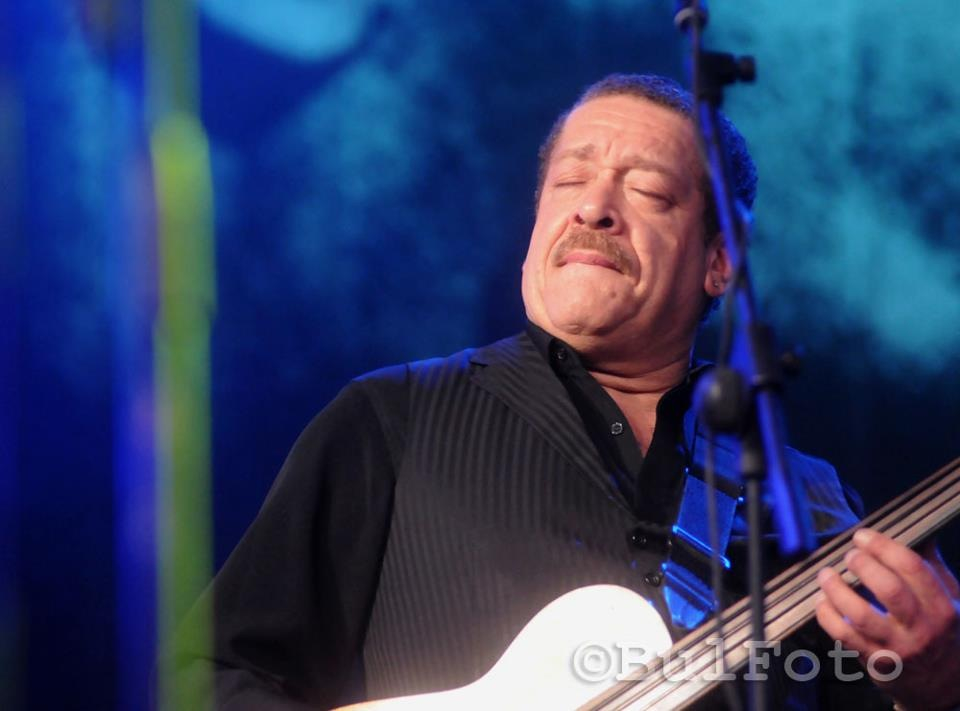

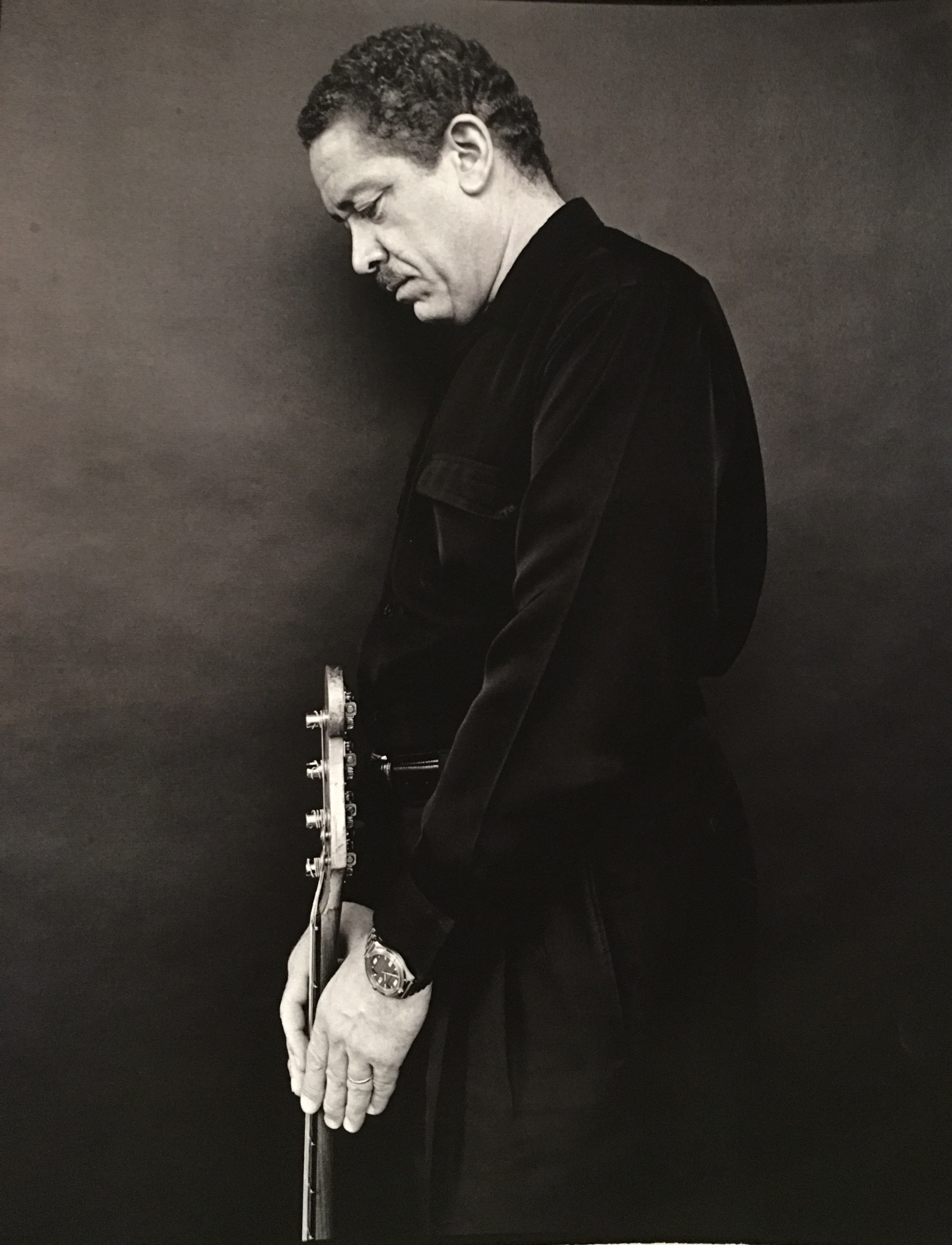

== Discography ==
=== Albums as a leader ===
- Infinite Jones 1973 (with drummer Gerry Brown) Keytone Records
- Bamboo Madness1973 (with drummer Gerry Brown) Limetree Records
- Mango Sunrise 1975 (with drummer Gerry Brown) Blue Note
- Still Can't Say Enough 1976 (with drummer Gerry Brown) Blue Note
- Medusa 1977 (with drummer Gerry Brown) Columbia
- Chaser 1978 (with drummer Gerry Brown) Columbia
- Brothers 1980 (with drummer Gerry Brown) Mood Records
- Brothers Reissue 1980 (with drummer Gerry Brown) CD Hot Wire Records EFA12839-2

=== Selected albums as a bassist ===
'With Chris Hinze

- Virgin Sacrifice 1972 CBS
- Mission Suite 1973 MPS
- Sister Slick 1974 CBS
- Parcival 1976 Philips 6629 006

With James Moody, Sahib Shihab, Jeremy Steig, Chris Hinze

- The Flute Summit 1973 Atlantic ATL 50 027

With Wim Stolwijk

- Clair-Obscure 1973 CBS S65234

With Charlie Mariano

- Cascade 1974 Limetree

With Toots Thielemans

- Philip Catherine and Friends 1974 Limetree

With Philip Catherine

- September Man 1975 Atlantic
- Guitars 1976 Atlantic
- Niram 1976 Warner Brothers BS 2950
- Selected Works 1974-1982 2017 Warner Music

With Jasper Van't Hof

- Eye-Ball 1974 Keytone
- However 1977 MPS 15 513

With Joachim Kuhn

- Cinemascope 1974 MPS/BASF
- Hip Elegy 1975 MPS/BASF
- Spring Fever 1976 Atlantic

With Toto Blanke

- Spider's Dance 1975 Vertigo – 6360 623

With Piano Conclave w/Gruntz, Dauner, Van't Hof, Kühn & Solal

- Palais Anthology 1975 MPS/BASF 20 227863

With Larry Coryell & The 11th House

- Level One 1975 Arista AL 4052
- Aspects 1976 Arista AL 4077
- January 1975, The Livelove Series Vol.1' 2014 RadioBremen/Promising Music 441202 CD
- The 11th House 1985 Metronome – 829 252-2
- Live At The Jazz Workshop Hi Hat Records HHCD014
- Seven Secrets 2016 Savoy Jazz SVY16137

With Larry Coryell

- Barefoot Man: Sanpaku 2016 Purple Pyramid CLO 0460

With Luther Allison

- Night Life 1976 Gordy G6-974S1

With Kalyan

- Kalyan 1977 MCA VIM-6126

With Art Webb

- Love Eyes 1977 Atlantic SD18226

With Bruce Fisher

- Red Hot 1977 Mercury SRM-1-1168

With Tony Silvester & The New Ingredient

- Magic Touch 1976 Mercury SRM-1-1105

With Mike Mandel

- Sky Music 1978 Vanguard 79409

With The Visitors, Earl & Carl Grubbs

- Motherland 1975 Muse 5094

With Eddie Henderson

- Runnin' To Your Love 1979 Capitol/EMI ST-11984

With Blue Note All-Stars

- Live at the Sunset Grill 1976 Blue Note

With Alphonse Mouzon

- Back Together Again 1977 Atlantic
- Poussez - Leave That Boy Alone 1977 Vanguard VSD 79433
- Star Edition 1979 MPS Records 0088.045

With CBS All-Stars

- Havana Jam, vol.1 1977 Columbia
- Havana Jam, vol.2 1977 Columbia

With Ellen McIlwaine

- Ellen McIlwaine 1978 United Artists UA-LA851

With Danny Toan

- Big Foot 1979 Sandra SMP 2105

With Stu Goldberg

- Fancy Glance 1979 in-akustik inak 8614

With Bob Malach

- People Music 1980 MPS 0068.258

With George Acogny

- First Steps In 1980 WEA/Strings 33.851

With Hubert Eaves

- Esoteric Funk 1977 East Wind UCCJ-9071

With McCoy Tyner

- Dimensions 1984 Elektra/Musician

With Dizzy Gillespie

- Live at the Jazz Plaza Festival, Havana, Cuba 1985 Yemaya YY9438
- Gillespie & Sanduval 1986 Habacan HABCD-2435
- Endlessly 1988 Impulse MCAD42153
- The Symphony Sessions 1989 Sion 181190
- A Night In Tunisia 1989 First Choice FC 4502
- Live at Blues Alley 1991 Blues Alley BAMSD 110003

With Dizzy Gillespie's Big Band

- Live at Royal Albert Hall 1988 BBC

With Dizzy Gillespie's United Nation Orchestra

- Live at the Royal Festival Hall 1989 ENJA - GRAMMY WINNER
- Strangers in Paradise 1990 Jazz Door 1269

With Claudio Roditi

- Samba Manhattan Style 1995 Reservoir
- Double Standards 1997 Reservoir
- Simpatico 2010 Resonance

With Fantasy Band

- The Fantasy Band 1993 DMP
- Sweet Dreams 1994 DMP CD-508
- The Kiss 1997 Shanachie 5028

With Bass Talk

- Play Da Bass 1997 Hot Wire Records HOT 9032C

With Young MC

- What's The Flavor? 1993 Capitol Records – CDEST 2198

With Mike Longo

- Dawn of a New Day 1997 CAP 927

With Slide Hampton

- Slide Plays Jobim 2002 Alleycat 20021
- Spirit Of The Horn (World of Trombones) 2003 MCG Jazz

With LLL Mental (Wolfgang Lackerschmid, Chuck Loeb, Marilyn Mazur)

- Mental 1997 HotWire 9029

With Dizzy Gillespie Alumni All-Stars

- Dizzy's 85th Birthday Celebration Shanachie 5040
- Dizzy's World Shanachie 5060

With Dizzy Gillespie All-Star Big Band

- Things to Come MCG Jazz MCGJ1009
- Dizzy's Business MCG Jazz MCGJ1023
- I'm Beboppin' Too 2009 Halfnote HN4540

With Nancy Wilson

- A Nancy Wilson Christmas MCG Jazz MCGJ1008

With Roy Hargrove and the RH Factor

- Hard Groove 2003 Verve

With Karl Latham

- Dancing Spirits Edition Musikat EDM0032

With Wolfgang Lackerschmid

- Gently But Deep

With Michael Urbaniak & Wolfgang Lackerschmid

- Polish Wind Minor Music Records GMBH 801121

With Stephanie Slesinger

- Angel Eyes 2004 Enja ENJ-94702

With Johannes Mössinger

- New York Trio Serenade 2003 Waterpipe Records 977 464

With Yotam Silberstein

- Brasil Jazz Legacy Productions JLP 1101016

=== Albums as a producer ===
- The New Love Carlos Garnett 1977 Muse 5133
- Fire Carlos Garnett 32 Jazz 32043
- Red Hot Bruce Fisher 1977 Mercury Records SRM-1-1168
- Love Eyes Art Webb 1977 Atlantic Records SD 18226
- Zbigniew Seifert 1977 Capitol Records
- Medusa 1978 Columbia Records
- Chaser John Lee & Gerry Brown 1979 Columbia Records
- Brothers (Eff Albers, Gerry Brown, John Lee, Darryl Thompson) 1980 Hot Wire EFA12839-2
- Bigfoot Danny Toan 1979 Sandra SMP 2105
- Private Concert Larry Coryell 1993 Acoustic Music Records
- Sweet Dreams Fantasy Band 1994 DMP CD-508
- The Kiss Fantasy Band 1997 Shanachie 5028
- LLL Mental (Wolfgang Lackerschmid, Chuck Loeb, Marilyn Mazur) Mental 1997 HotWire 9029
- Endless is Love Jon Lucien 1996 Shanachie 5031
- Tongo Hip Pocket 1997 TRC 9702
- Lavender Light Lavender Light 1994
- Lavender Light Light In The House 1996
- Once Upon A Time Shirley Marshall 1996 SAMA SO1-918
- Laura Heumer
- Judy Gajary
- Dizzy's 85th Birthday Celebration Dizzy Gillespie Alumni All-Stars 1997 Shanachie 5040
- Slide Plays Jobim Slide Hampton 2002 Alleycat 20021
- Live Saundra Santiago
- Soul Searchin' Winston Byrd 2004 D.Y.P. Limited
- Gordon James After Hours 2004 Caress Music
- Dizzy's World Dizzy Gillespie Alumni All-Stars 1999 Shanachie
- Things to Come Dizzy Gillespie Alumni All-Star Big Band MCG Jazz
- Dizzy's Business Dizzy Gillespie All-Star Big Band MCG Jazz
- I'm Beboppin' Too Dizzy Gillespie All-Star Big Band HalfNote HN4540
- Relentless Sharel Cassity Jazz Legacy Productions JLP0901001
- Spirit Cyrus Chestnut Jazz Legacy Productions JLP0901002
- Eloquence Steve Davis Jazz Legacy Productions JLP0901003
- Endurance Heath Brothers Jazz Legacy Productions JLP0901004
- Incorrigable One for All Jazz Legacy Productions JLP1001005
- Grace Michael Dease Jazz Legacy Productions JLP 1001007
- Resonance Yotam Silberstein Jazz Legacy Productions JLP 1001008
- 'Warriors The Cookers Jazz Legacy Productions JLP1001009
- Musicá Helio Alves Jazz Legacy Productions JLP1001010
- Journeys Cyrus Chestnut Trio Jazz Legacy Productions JLP1001011
- 'Uplift Monty Alexander Jazz Legacy Productions JLP1001012
- Source Benny Green Jazz Legacy Productions JLP1001014
- Resilience Tim Mayer Jazz Legacy Productions JLP1101015
- Brasil Yotam Silberstein Jazz Legacy Productions JLP1101016
- Respect vol.1 Roy Assaf Jazz Legacy Productions JLP11017
- Coexist Winard Harper Jazz Legacy Productions JLP1201018
- Blackside Mark Gross Jazz Legacy Productions JLP1201019
- Uplift 2 Monty Alexander Jazz Legacy Productions JLP1201020
- Togetherness Jimmy Heath Big Band Jazz Legacy Productions JLP1201022
- The Shadow Of Your Smile Roberta Gambarini 2013 Boundee Japan FNCJ-5553
- Blessings Antonio Hart Jazz Legacy Productions JLP1501023
- Angels Andy Scott Jazz Legacy Productions JLP1501021
- Melding Hank Jones & Steve Davis Jazz Legacy Productions JLP
- Helio Alves featuring Airto Jazz Legacy Productions JLP
- Coexisting Spirits Roberta Gambarini & Jimmy Heath Groovin' High Records
- Subtle Thrills Randa Ghossoub Luna Records
- Seven Secrets Larry Coryell's 11th House 2016 Savoy Jazz SVY16137
- Evolve Sharel Cassity Relsha Music 001
- Dedications Roberta Gambarini 2019 55 Records FNCJ-5566
- Jazz Batá 2 Chucho Valdez 2019 Mack Avenue (2019 Latin Grammy Winner - Best Latin Jazz Album)
- Light Blue Julien Hucq 2019 Early Bird Records
- Trombocalist Ron Wilkins 2020
