= Aldo Romano =

Italian jazz drummer (born 1941)

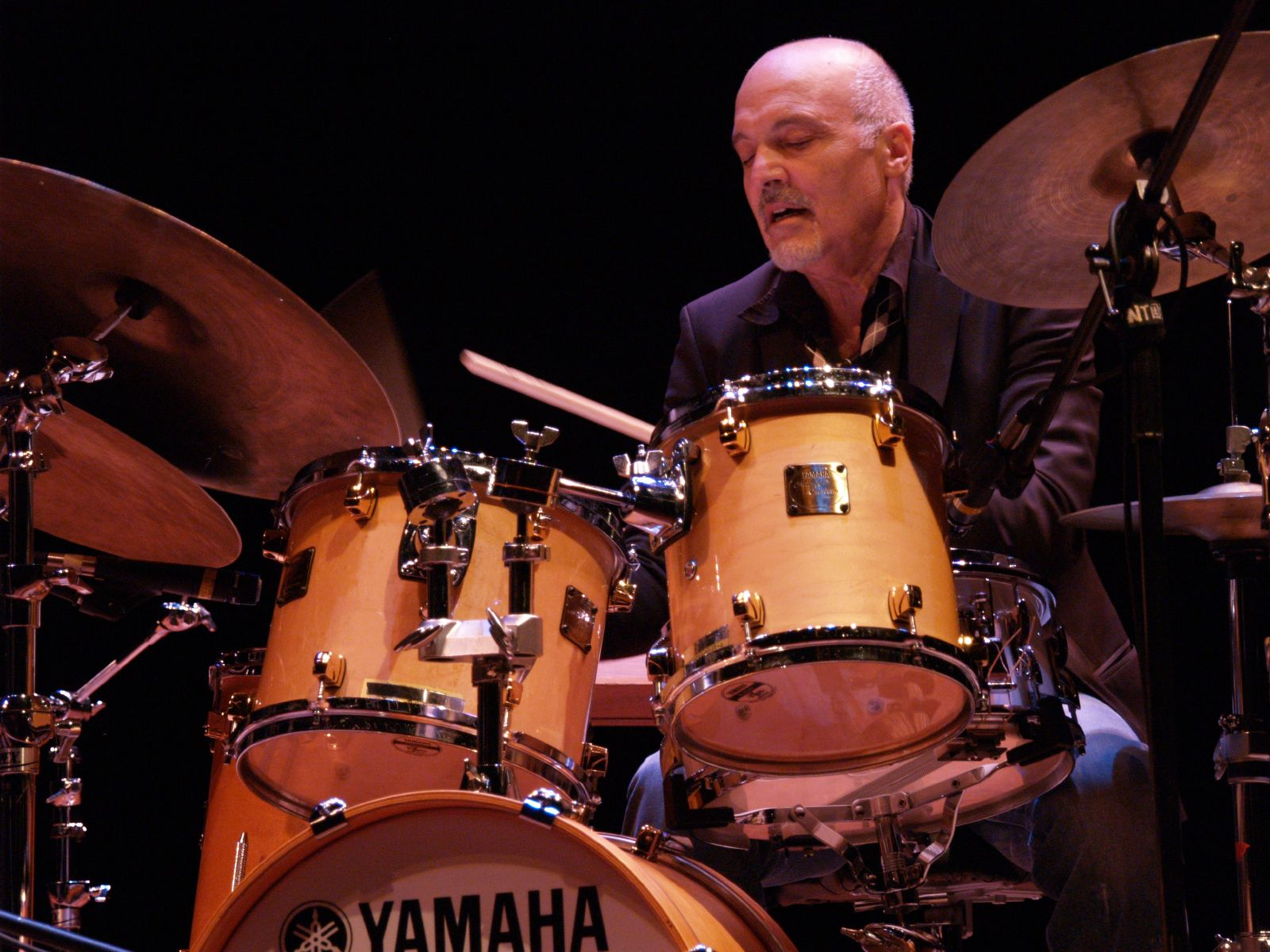
- Photo by Daniel Shen

Background information
- Born: 16 January 1941 (age 85); Belluno, Italy
- Genres: Avant-garde jazz, jazz fusion, rock
- Occupation: Musician
- Instrument: Drums
- Label: Owl

Aldo Romano (born 16 January 1941) is an Italian jazz drummer. He also founded a rock group in 1971.

== Biography ==
He was born in Belluno, Italy. Romano moved to France as a child and by the 1950s he was playing guitar and drums professionally in Paris, but he first gained attention when he started working with Don Cherry in 1963. He recorded with Steve Lacy, and would go on to tour with Dexter Gordon among others. In the 1970s, he moved into rock-influenced forms of jazz fusion and, in 1978, made his first album as a leader. In the 1980s, he returned to his earlier style for several albums. Although he has lived most of his life in France, he has retained an affection for Italy and has set up a quartet of Italian jazz musicians. Romano also played a role in starting the career of French pianist Michel Petrucciani. In 2004, he won the Jazzpar Prize.

== Discography ==
=== As leader/co-leader ===
- Divieto Di Santificazione with Jean-François Jenny-Clark (Horo, 1977)
- Il Piacere (Owl, 1979)
- Night Diary (Owl, 1980)
- Alma Latina (Owl, 1983)
- Ritual (Owl, 1988)
- Eric Barret/Aldo Romano/Henri Texier (Carlyne Music, 1988)
- To Be Ornette to Be (Owl, 1989)
- Ten Tales with Joe Lovano (Owl, 1990)
- Dreams & Waters (Owl, 1991)
- Yesterday's Tomorrow with Ron McClure, John Abercrombie (European Music Productions, 1991)
- Non Dimenticar (PolyGram, 1993)
- Prosodie (Verve, 1995)
- Intervista (Verve, 1997)
- Because of Bechet (EmArcy/Universal 2002)
- Threesome (Universal 2004)
- The Jazzpar Prize (Enja 2004)
- Corners (Label Bleu 2005)
- Chante (Dreyfus 2005)
- Flower Power (Naive, 2006)
- Etat De Fait (Dreyfus, 2007)
- Just Jazz (Dreyfus, 2008)
- Complete Communion to Don Cherry (Dreyfus, 2010)
- Desireless (Musica Jazz, 2010)
- Origine (Dreyfus 2010)
- Inner Smile (Dreyfus, 2011)
- Plays the Connection (Dreyfus, 2013)
- Liberi Sumus (Le Triton, 2014)
- Melodies En Noir & Blanc (Le Triton, 2017)
- La Belle Vie (Sunset, 2019)

=== As sideman ===
With Gordon Beck

- Sunbird (JMS-Cream, 1979)

With Philip Catherine Trio

- Transparence (1986)

With Don Cherry

- Togetherness (Durium, 1965)
- Live at Cafe Montmartre 1966 (3 volumes) (ESP-Disk, 1966)

With Paolo Damiani

- Poor Memory (Splasc(h), 1987)

With Michel Graillier

- Dream Drops (Owl, 1982)

With Franz Koglmann and Bill Dixon

- Opium for Franz (Pipe, 1977) – recorded in 1976; 3 tracks reissued on Opium (Between the Lines, 2001)

With Rolf Kühn and Joachim Kühn

- Impressions of New York (Impulse!, 1967)

With Steve Kuhn, Miroslav Vitous

- Oceans in the Sky (Owl, 1990)

With Steve Lacy

- Jazz Realities (Fontana, 1966)
- Disposability (RCA [Italy], 1966)
- Sortie (GTA, 1966)
- Epistophy (BYG Actuel, 1969)

With Michel Petrucciani

- Flash (Bingow, 1980)
- Michel Petrucciani (Owl, 1981)
- Estate (IRD, 1982)
- Playground (Blue Note, 1991)

With Enrico Rava

- Enrico Rava Quartet (ECM, 1978)

With Louis Sclavis, Henri Texier, and Guy Le Querrec

- Carnet de Routes (Label Bleu, 1995)
- Suite Africaine (Label Bleu, 1999)
- African Flashback (Label Bleu, 2005)
