= Toto Blanke =

Hans Otto Blanke
- Also known as: Toto Blanke
- Born: September 16, 1936; Paderborn
- Died: October 24, 2013 (aged 77); Hamburg
- Occupation: Musician
- Instrument: Guitar

Hans Otto Blanke (16 September 1936 - 24 October 2013), better known by his stage name Toto Blanke, was a German jazz guitarist.

== Career ==
Between 1957 and 1964, Blanke performed with Gunter Hampel and Otto Wolters while studying architecture in Braunschweig. In the early 1960s, he was a member of the City Gents dance band in Paderborn. In 1970, he started working with the rock jazz group Association P. C. In the 1960s he worked with Jeremy Steig, Rolf Kühn, Randy Brecker, Jan Akkerman and Philip Catherine. In 1975, Blanke released his first album “Spiders Dance” with Joachim Kühn, Charlie Mariano, John Lee and Gerry Brown.

In 2011, Blanke received the Culture Prize from his hometown Paderborn for his artistic work.
