= Rolf Kühn =

German musician (1929–2022)

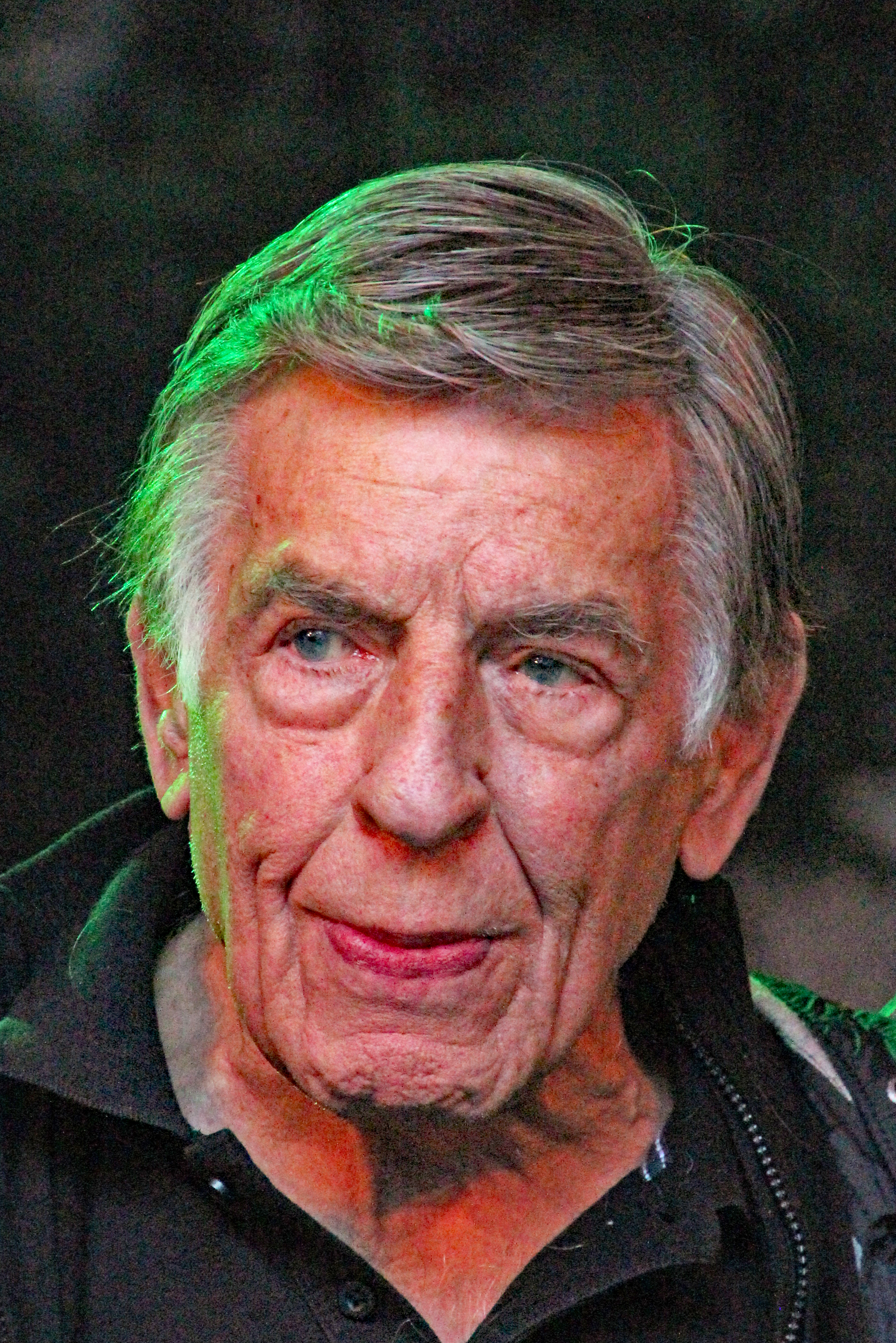
- Kühn in 2017

Background information
- Born: 28 September 1929; Cologne, Rhine Province, Prussia, Germany
- Died: 18 August 2022 (aged 92) Berlin, Germany
- Genres: Jazz
- Occupation: Musician
- Instruments: Clarinet, saxophone
- Formerly of: Joachim Kühn
- Website: rolf-kuehn.de

Rolf Kühn (29 September 1929 – 18 August 2022) was a German jazz clarinetist and saxophonist. He was the older brother of the pianist Joachim Kühn.

== Life and career ==
Kühn lived in the United States from 1956 to 1962. John Hammond favourably compared him with Benny Goodman. He moved to West Germany in 1962, where he became the director of the NDR Television Orchestra in Hamburg. He concurrently had a performing and recording career. Since the 1960s, his musical scope has encompassed not only traditional jazz but also free jazz and jazz-rock

In 2008, he founded band with Christian Lillinger, Ronny Graupe, and Johannes Fink.

Rolf Kühn died on 18 August 2022, at the age of 92.

== Discography ==
=== As leader ===
- Streamline (Vanguard, 1956)
- Rolf Kuhn and His Sound of Jazz (Urania, 1960)
- Rolf Kuhn feat. Klaus Doldinger (Brunswick, 1962)
- Solarius (Amiga, 1965)
- Nana Und Rolf in Action: Make Love! (Intercord, 1969)
- R. K. Sextet (Intercord, 1969)
- Devil in Paradise (MPS/BASF, 1971)
- The Day After (MPS, 1972)
- Connection '74 (MPS/BASF, 1974)
- Total Space (MPS/BASF, 1975)
- Symphonic Swampfire (MPS, 1979)
- Cucu Ear (MPS, 1980)
- Don't Split (L+R, 1983)
- As Time Goes By (Blue Flame, 1991)
- Big Band Connection (Blue Flame, 1993)
- Affairs (Intuition, 1997)
- Inside Out (Intuition, 1999)
- Internal Eyes (Intuition, 1999)
- Smile: Famous Themes from Hollywood (Intuition, 2003)
- Bouncing with Bud (In+Out, 2005)
- Close Up (Jazzwerkstatt, 2009)
- Rollercoaster (Jazzwerkstatt, 2009)
- Stop Time! (Sonorama, 2014)
- Stereo (MPS, 2015)
- Spotlights (MPS, 2016)
- Yellow + Blue (MPS, 2018)

With Joachim Kuhn

- Re-Union in Berlin (CBS, 1965)
- Transfiguration (SABA, 1967)
- Impressions of New York (Impulse!, 1968)
- Monday Morning Hor Zu (Black Label, 1969)
- The Kuhn Brothers & the Mad Rockers (Metronome, 1969)
- Bloody Rockers (BYG, 1969)
- Going to the Rainbow (BASF, 1971)
- Brothers (Intuition, 1996)
- East Berlin 1966 (Another Side (of Jazz), 2006)
- Lifeline (Impulse!, 2012)

=== As sideman ===
With Horst Jankowski

- Gaste Bei Horst Jankowski (Metronome, 1962)
- Follow Me (Intercord, 1972)
- Starportrait/Follow Me (Intercord, 1975)
- Wonderful (Opera, 2003)

With others

- Eddie Costa, At Newport (Verve, 1957)
- Buddy DeFranco, The Three Sopranos (2001)
- Klaus Doldinger, Jubilee (Atlantic, 1973)
- Tommy Dorsey, The Tommy Dorsey Orchestra (Brunswick, 1958)
- European Jazz Ensemble, 20th Anniversary Tour (Konnex, 1997)
- Urbie Green, The Persuasive Trombone of Urbie Green (Command, 1960)
- Urbie Green, The Message (RCA, 1986)
- Friedrich Gulda, Music for 4 Soloists and Band No. 1 (SABA, 1965)
- Friedrich Gulda, Austrian Jazz Art: Friedrich Gulda and His Big bands (Amadeo, 2004)
- Greetje Kauffeld, Young Girl Sunday Jazz (Sonorama, 2015)
- Eartha Kitt, Thinking Jazz (ITM, 1991)
- Albert Mangelsdorff, Albert Mangelsdorff (Fabbri Editori 1981)
- Albert Mangelsdorff, Early Discoveries (Jazzhaus, 2016)
- Oscar Pettiford, Germany 1958/1959 (Jazzhaus, 2013)
- George Wallington, The Workshop of the George Wallington Trio & Eddie Costa Trio (Norgran, 1975)
