= Joachim Kühn =

German jazz pianist (born 1944)

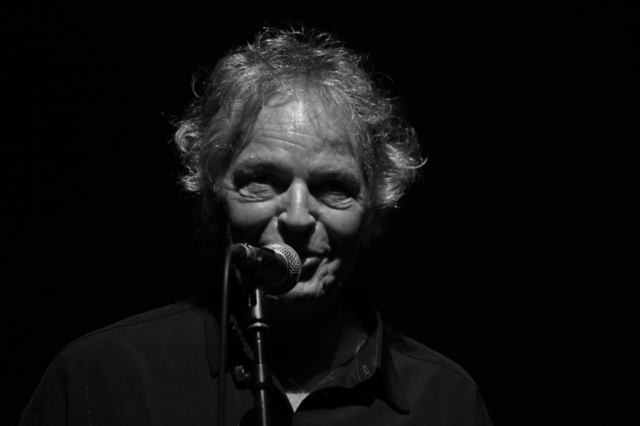
- Joachim Kühn, Jazz Festival in Ljubljana, Slovenia, 3 July 2014

Background information
- Born: Joachim Kurt Kühn; 15 March 1944 (age 82); Leipzig, Nazi Germany
- Genres: Classical, jazz, avant-garde jazz
- Occupations: Musician, songwriter, record producer
- Instruments: Piano, keyboards
- Years active: 1961 – present
- Labels: Impulse!, BYG Actuel, MPS, ACT

Joachim Kurt Kühn (born 15 March 1944) is a German jazz pianist.

== Biography ==
Kühn was born in Leipzig, Germany. He was a musical prodigy and made his debut as a concert pianist, having studied classical piano and composition, with Arthur Schmidt-Elsey. Influenced by his elder brother, clarinetist Rolf Kühn, he simultaneously grew interested in jazz. In 1961, he became a professional jazz musician. With a trio of his own, founded in 1964, he presented the first free jazz in the GDR. In 1966, he left the country and settled in Hamburg. Together with his brother, he played at the Newport Jazz Festival and recorded with Jimmy Garrison and Aldo Romano for Impulse!.

Kühn has largely lived in Paris since 1968 and worked with Don Cherry, Karl Berger, Slide Hampton, Phil Woods, Michel Portal, Barre Phillips, Eje Thelin, Ray Lema, Hellmut Hattler, and Jean-Luc Ponty. As a member of Pierre Courbois's Association P.C., he turned to electronic keyboards. During the second half of the 1970s, he lived in California and joined the West Coast fusion scene and recorded with Alphonse Mouzon, Billy Cobham, Michael Brecker, and Eddie Gómez.

Having settled near Paris again, he played in an acoustic trio with Jean-François Jenny-Clark and Daniel Humair since 1985. In the summer of 1996, he joined Ornette Coleman for two concerts at the Verona and Leipzig festivals, which opened the way for his Diminished Augmented System. In 2015 he formed the New Joachim Kühn Trio with Chris Jennings and Eric Schaefer.

== Discography ==
=== As leader/co-leader ===
Year recorded	Title	Label	Notes
1967	Impressions of New York	Impulse!	Quartet, with Rolf Kühn (clarinet), Jimmy Garrison (bass), Aldo Romano (drums)
1969	Sound of Feelings	BYG Actuel	Trio, with Jean-François Jenny-Clark and Aldo Romano
1970	Paris Is Wonderful	Byg Actuel	Trio, with Jean-François Jenny-Clark and Aldo Romano
1973	This Way Out	BASF/MPS	with Gerd Dudek, Peter Warren, Daniel Humair
1974	Cinemascope		
1976	Hip Elegy	MPS	with Terumasa Hino, Philip Catherine, John Lee, Naná Vasconcelos, Alphonse Mouzon
1976	Solo Now		with Albert Mangelsdorff, Gunter Hampel, Pierre Favre
1976	Springfever	Atlantic	Most tracks quartet, with Philip Catherine (guitar), John Lee (bass), Gerry Brown (drums); one track with Zbigniew Seifert (violin), Curt Cress (drums) added
1977	Charisma	Atlantic	Solo piano
1978	Sunshower	Atlantic	With Jan Akkerman and Ray Gomez (guitar), Tony Newton (electric bass, piccolo bass), Glenn Symmonds (drums), Willie Dee (vocals)
1979	Kiel/Stuttgart Live!	Inak	Duo, with Jan Akkerman (guitar, electric guitar, synthesizer); in concert
1980	Snow in the Desert	Atlantic	Solo piano
1981	Nightline New York	Inak	With Michael Brecker and Bob Mintzer (tenor sax), Eddie Gómez, Billy Hart (drums), Mark Nauseef (percussion)
1983	I'm Not Dreaming	CMP	With George Lewis (trombone), Ottomar Borwitzky (cello), Mark Nauseef (piccolo, tenor sax, percussion), Herbert Forsch (percussion)
1984	Distance	CMP	Solo piano
1985	Transformations	CMP	Solo piano; also known as Wandlungen
1985	Easy to Read	Owl	Trio, with Jean-François Jenny-Clark (bass), Daniel Humair (drums)
1988	From Time to Time Free	CMP	Trio, with Jean-François Jenny-Clark (bass), Daniel Humair (drums)
1988	Ambiance	Ambiance	Duo, with Walter Quintus (digital sound-board)
1988	Situations	Atlantic	Solo piano
1989	Live: Théâtre De La Ville, Paris, 1989	CMP	Trio, with Jean-François Jenny-Clark and Daniel Humair; in concert
1990	Dynamics	CMP	Solo piano
1990	Let's Be Generous	CMP	With Miroslav Tadic (guitar), Tony Newton (bass), Mark Nauseef (drums, percussion)
1991	Get Up Early	Ambiance	Duo, with Walter Quintus (digital sound-board)
1991	Carambolage	CMP	With the WDR Big Band
1991–92	Sometime Ago	New Edition	With Harry Beckett (trumpet, flugelhorn), Jerry Bergonzi (tenor sax), Jean-François Jenny-Clark and Jesper Lundgaard (bass), Thomas Alkier (drums); released 2006
1993?	Usual Confusion		Trio, with Jean-François Jenny-Clark and Daniel Humair
1994?	Joachim Kühn Plays Lili Marleen		Solo piano
1994	Europeana	ACT	With Radio Philharmonie Hannover NDR
1987–95	Joachim Kühn Birthday Edition / Europeana	ACT	Some tracks trio, with Jean-François Jenny-Clark (bass), Daniel Humair (drums); in concert; other tracks released on Europeana; released 2014
1995	Famous Melodies	Label Bleu	Solo piano
1995?	Abstracts	Label Bleu	Solo piano
1996	Colors: Live from Leipzig	Harmolodic/Verve	Duo, with Ornette Coleman (alto sax, trumpet, violin); in concert
1997?	Generations from (East) Germany	KlangRäume	Duo, with Connie Bauer
1998?	Triple Entente	Mercury/PolyGram France	Trio, with Jean-François Jenny-Clark and Daniel Humair
1999	The Diminished Augmented System	EmArcy	Solo piano
2001?	Universal Time		with Chris Potter, Scott Colley, Horacio 'El Negro' Hernandez, Michel Portal
2002?	Bach Now - Live		with Thomanerchor
2003	Piano Works I: Allegro Vivace	ACT	Solo piano
2004	Poison	In + Out	Trio, with Jean-Paul Celea (bass), Wolfgang Reisinger (drums)
2005?	Journey to the Centre of an Egg	Enja	with Rabih Abou-Khalil, Jarrod Cagwin
2006	Kalimba	ACT	Trio, with Majid Bekkas (guembri, oud, kalimba, vocals), Ramón López (drums)
2008	Piano Works IX: Live at Schloss Elmau	ACT	Duo, with Michael Wollny (piano); in concert
2008	Out of the Desert	ACT	With Majid Bekkas (vocals, guembri, kalimba, molo), Ramón López (drums, tabla), guests
2010	Chalaba	ACT	Trio, with Majid Bekkas (vocals, guembri, oud), Ramón López (drums, tabla, percussion)
2010	Out of the Desert Live	ACT	With Majid Bekkas (vocals, guembri, oud), Ramón López (drums, tabla, percussion), hr-Bigband / Frankfurt Radio Bigband; in concert
2011?	Wo!man	Archie Ball	Duo, with Archie Shepp
2011–12	Voodoo Sense	ACT	With Majid Bekkas (guembri, vocals, kalimba, balafon), Ramón López (drums, percussion); with Archie Shepp (tenor sax), Kouassi Bessan Joseph and Gouria Danielle (percussion, vocals), Dally Jean Eric (calabas), Gilles Ahadji (jembe), Abdessadek Bounhar (karkabou) added on some tracks
2012?	Lifeline	Boutique	with Rolf Kühn, John Patitucci, Brian Blade
2014?	Moscow	ACT	Duo, with Alexey Kruglov (alto sax)
2015	Beauty and Truth	ACT	Trio, with Chris Jennings (bass), Eric Schaefer (drums)
2017	Love & Peace	ACT	Trio, with Chris Jennings (bass), Eric Schaefer (drums)
2018	Piano Works XIII: Melodic Ornette Coleman	ACT	Solo piano
2020	Speaking Sound	ACT	Duo with violinist Mateusz Smoczyński
2021	Touch the Light	ACT	Solo piano
2024	Duo	ACT	Duo, with Michael Wollny (piano); in concert, 2023

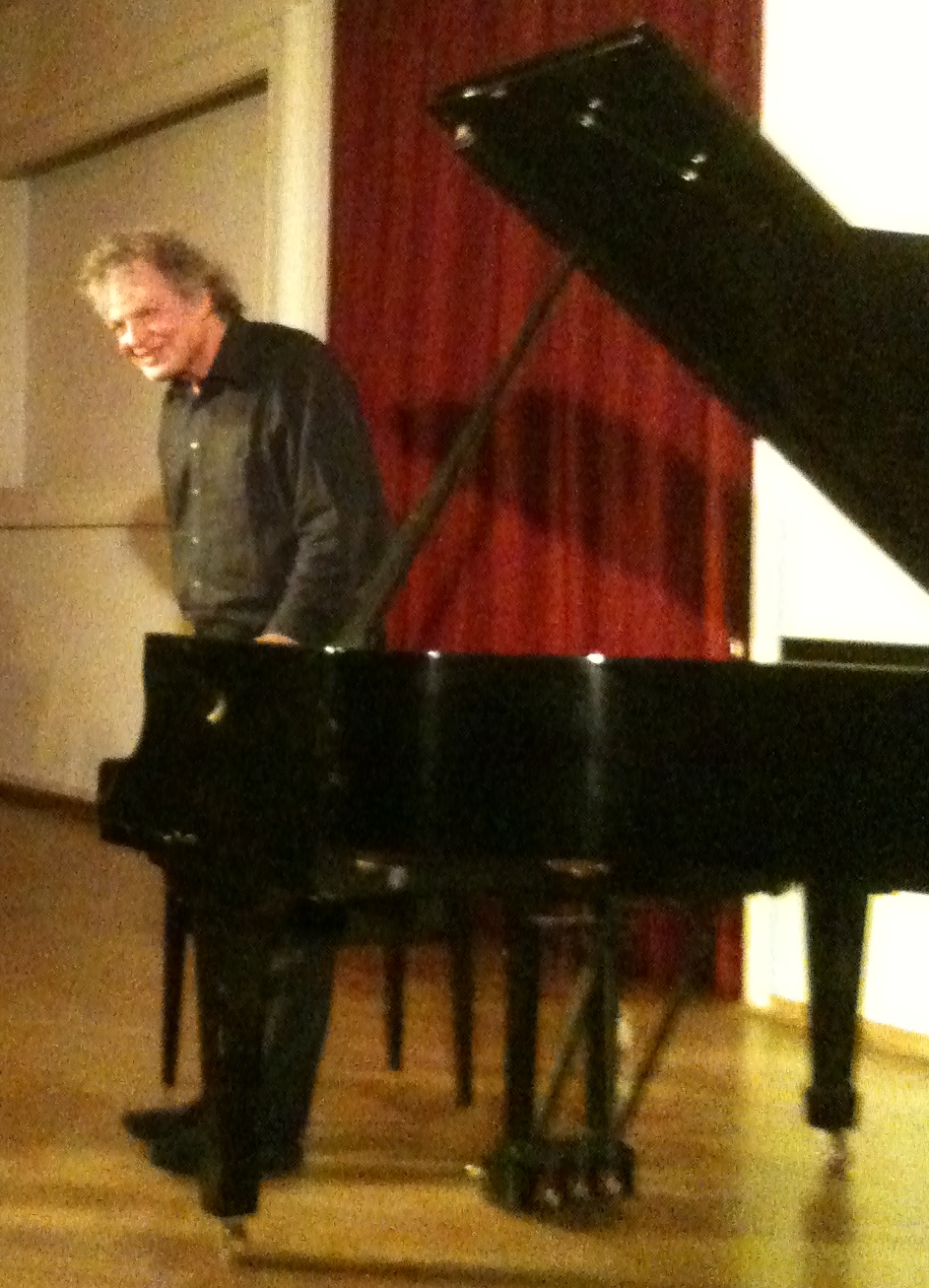
Joachim Kühn in March 2010

=== As sideman ===
- Jan Akkerman, Jan Akkerman (Atlantic, 1977)
- Gary Bartz, Lee Konitz, Jackie McLean and Charlie Mariano: Altissimo (Philips, 1973)
- Larry Coryell - Catherine - Kühn: Live! (Elektra, 1980)
- Association P.C. (Pierre Courbois) and Jeremy Steig: Mama Kuku (Live) (BASF/MPS, 1974)
- Joe Henderson Collective: Black Narcissus (Milestone, 1976)
- The Rolf Kühn Group: Solarius (Amiga, 1965)
- The Rolf Kühn Group: The Day After (BASF/MPS, 1972) featuring Phil Woods
- The Rolf Kühn Group: Connection 74 (BASF/MPS, 1974) featuring Randy Brecker
- Werner Müller Quintett, on side one of anthology Modern Jazz Studio Nr. 2 (Amiga, 1966)
- Zbigniew Namyslowski Quartet with Joachim Kühn: Live at Kosmos, Berlin (ITM, 1965, released, 2008)
- Zbigniew Seifert: Man of the Light (BASF/MPS, 1976) with Cecil McBee, Billy Hart, and Jasper van 't Hof
- SHQ, led by Karel Velebný - SHQ A Přátelé (Supraphon, 1965)
- Alan Silva: Seasons (BYG, 1971)
