= Thinking Out Loud (Frank Gambale album) =

Studio album by Frank Gambale
- Released: 1995
- Recorded: May 1995
- Studio: Milagro Sound Recorders in Glendale, California
- Genre: Smooth jazz, jazz fusion
- Length: 60:05
- Label: Victor
- Producer: Frank Gambale, Akira Taguchi

Frank Gambale chronology
Passages (1994)	Thinking Out Loud (1995)	Coming to Your Senses (2000)

Thinking Out Loud is the seventh studio album by guitarist Frank Gambale, released in 1995 through Victor Entertainment and reissued on 24 April 2001 through Samson Records.

== Critical reception ==
Professional ratings
Review scores
Source	Rating
AllMusic	2/5 stars

Scott Yanow at AllMusic awarded Thinking Out Loud two stars out of five. He described it as "sounding unexpectedly close to George Benson", but Gambale's compositions were criticised as weak ("funky but without soul or any worthwhile melodies") and Dave Weckl's performances as "remarkably dull automatic pilot drumming".

== Track listing ==
All music is composed by Frank Gambale

No.	Title	Length
1.	"Magritte"	6:50
2.	"Bondi Beach"	4:45
3.	"No-Neck Louie"	5:11
4.	"Gaudi"	5:51
5.	"Felicidad"	4:52
6.	"Dali"	5:58
7.	"Infinity"	6:10
8.	"A Lover's Night"	4:27
9.	"The Avengers Suite (Parts 1 and 2)"	9:28
10.	"My Little Viper"	6:33
Total length:		60:05

== Personnel ==
Thinking Out Loud is credited to the following:

- Frank Gambale – composition, guitar, mixing, production
- Libby Lavella – vocals
- Otmaro Ruíz – keyboard (tracks 1, 7, 9)
- David Goldblatt – keyboard (tracks 2, 4–6, 8)
- Brian Auger – Hammond organ
- Dave Weckl – drums
- Walfredo Reyes, Jr. – percussion
- Tim Landers – bass (tracks 1, 5, 6, 8, 9)
- Alphonso Johnson – bass (tracks 2–4, 7, 10)
- Robert M. Biles – engineering, mixing
- Matt Stephens – engineering assistance
- Tony Flores – engineering assistance
- Alan Yoshida – mastering
- Akira Taguchi – executive production
