= Kei Akagi =

Japanese American jazz pianist (born 1953)

- Born: March 16, 1953 (age 73); Japan
- Genres: Jazz, jazz fusion
- Instrument: Piano
- Website: www.aomori-net.ne.jp/~yamagen/kei/top.htm

Kei Akagi (ケイ 赤城/赤城 恵, Akagi Kei; born March 16, 1953) is a Japanese American jazz pianist. In particular, he is known for his work with the Airto Moreira/Flora Purim group and in Miles Davis's band in the late 1980s and early 1990s.

He was born in Japan, but lived in Cleveland, Ohio, for part of his childhood, until he moved back to Japan at the age of 12. He later returned to the United States at 22. He is associated with the Californian jazz scene at present. He is the Chancellor Professor of Music at the University of California, Irvine.

== Discography ==
=== As leader/co-leader ===
Year recorded	Title	Label	Year released	Notes
1983	Symphonic Fusion – The Earth	Nippon Columbia	1983	Soundtrack
1991	Playroom	Moo	1992	Some tracks trio, with Bob Harrison and John Patitucci (bass; separately), Tom Brechtlein (drums); most tracks quartet, with Rick Margitza (tenor sax, soprano sax) added
1991	Sound Circle	Paddle Wheel	1992	As The Asian American Jazz Trio; with Rufus Reid (bass), Akira Tana (drums)
1994?	Mirror Puzzle	Audioquest	1994	Quartet, with Rick Margitza (tenor sax, soprano sax), Charles Fambrough (bass), Willie Jones III (drums)
1998	New Smiles and Traveled Miles	Groove Note	2000	Trio, with Darek Oleszkiewicz (bass), Joe LaBarbera (drums)
1999	Viewpoint	Video Arts	2000	Trio
2001	Palette	Video Arts	2001	Some tracks trio, with Tomokazu Sugimoto (bass), Tamaya Honda (drums); some tracks trio with Nobuyoshi Ino (bass), Hiroshi Murakami (drums); some tracks quartet, with Kousuke Mine (tenor sax, bass clarinet) added
2002	Grand New Touch	Video Arts	2003	Duo, with Fumio Karashima (piano)
2003	A Hint of You	Video Arts	2003	Trio, with Tomokazu Sugimoto (bass), Tamaya Honda (drums)
2003	Modern Ivory	Video Arts	2004	Trio, with Tomokazu Sugimoto (bass), Tamaya Honda (drums)
2005	Live – Shapes in Sound	Video Arts	2006	Trio, with Tomokazu Sugimoto (bass), Tamaya Honda (drums); in concert
2007	Liquid Blue	Time & Style	2007	Trio, with Tomokazu Sugimoto (bass), Tamaya Honda (drums)
2014	Circlepoint	Time & Style	2014	Trio, with Shunya Wakai (bass), Tamaya Honda (drums)
2016	Contrast & Form	Time & Style	2016	Trio, with Shunya Wakai (bass), Tamaya Honda (drums)
2017	Aqua Puzzle	Time & Style	2018	Trio, with Shunya Wakai (bass), Tamaya Honda (drums)

=== As sideman ===
With Miles Davis

- Dingo with Michel Legrand (Warner Bros., 1991) – soundtrack
- Miles in Paris (Warner Bros., 1991) – live recorded in 1989
- Live Around the World (Warner Bros., 1996) – live recorded in 1988–91

With Frank Gambale

- Brave New Guitar (Legato, 1985)
- A Present for the Future (Legato, 1987)
- Live! (Legato, 1989) – live recorded in 1988
- Thunder from Down Under (Victor, 1990) – recorded in 1989
- Note Worker (Victor, 1991)

With Allan Holdsworth

- Frankfurt '86 (Live, 2020)[CD & DVD-Video]

With Gary Lefebvre

- Gary Lefebvre Quartet (Discovery Records, 1982)
- Another Time, Another Place (Figueroa Records, 1986)

With Al di Meola

- Tirami Su (Manhattan, 1987)
- Live at Montreal International Jazz Festival 88 (Vap, 2002)[DVD-Video] – live recorded in 1988 at Montreal International Jazz Festival

With James Newton

- Suite for Frida Kahlo (AudioQuest Music, 1994)

With Stanley Turrentine

- Do You Have Any Sugar? (Concord Vista, 1999)
