= Coming to Your Senses =

Studio album by Frank Gambale
- Released: 8 February 2000
- Recorded: Ric Fierabracci's studio
- Genres: Jazz fusion, instrumental rock
- Length: 63:25
- Label: Favored Nations
- Producer: Frank Gambale

Frank Gambale chronology
Thinking Out Loud (1995)	Coming to Your Senses (2000)	Absolutely Live - in Poland (2002)

Professional ratings
Review scores
Source	Rating
AllMusic	4/5 stars
All About Jazz	Favourable

Coming to Your Senses is the eighth studio album by guitarist Frank Gambale, released on 8 February 2000 through Favored Nations Entertainment.

== Track listing ==
All music is composed by Frank Gambale.

No.	Title	Length
1.	"Up in Beachwood"	6:55
2.	"Circular Quay"	5:41
3.	"Major Fascination"	6:40
4.	"Salvador Once More"	9:57
5.	"Cybernaughts"	6:06
6.	"Mirage Mystery"	4:21
7.	"Isola d'Elba"	4:46
8.	"Land of the Leal"	8:14
9.	"The Italian Job"	5:29
10.	"Loch Ness Monster"	5:16
Total length:		63:25

== Personnel ==
- Frank Gambale – guitar, electric sitar, sound effects, arrangement, production
- Hans Zermuehlen– keyboard
- Mark Schulman – drums (tracks 1, 6, 9)
- Ray Brinker – drums (tracks 2, 8)
- Joel Taylor – drums (tracks 3, 4, 7)
- Enzo Todesco – drums (tracks 5, 10)
- Ric Fierabracci – bass
- Robert M. Biles – engineering
- Joe Gastwirt – mastering
