= Endangered species (disambiguation) =

An endangered species is a plant or animal species that is near extinction.

Endangered Species may also refer to:

== Films ==
- Endangered Species (1982 film), a science fiction film by Alan Rudolph
- Endangered Species (2002 film), also released as Earth Alien, a science fiction horror film by Kevin S. Tenney
- Endangered Species, an unrealized film by Eli Roth
- Max Steel: Endangered Species, a 2004 direct-to-DVD film
- Endangered Species (2021 film), an action-adventure film directed by M. J. Bassett

== Literature ==
- Endangered Species (novel), a 2003 novel based on the American TV series Angel
- "Endangered Species" (The Amazing Spider-Man), an issue of the comic book The Amazing Spider-Man in the storyline "The Gauntlet"
- X-Men: Endangered Species, a 2007 comic book storyline
- Endangered Species, a 1989 short-story collection by Gene Wolfe
- Endangered Species, a 2007 Hardy Boys novel

== Music ==
=== Albums ===
- Endangered Species (Big Pun album), 2001
- Endangered Species (Des'ree album), 2000
- Endangered Species (Endangered Species album), 2001
- Endangered Species (eX-Girl album), or the title song, 2004
- Endangered Species (Flaw album), or the title song, 2004
- Endangered Species (H.A.W.K. album), or the title song, 2007
- Endangered Species (Klaatu album), 1980
- Endangered Species (Lynyrd Skynyrd album), 1994
- Endangered Species (Man album), 2000
- Endangered Species (Y&T album), 1997
- Endangered Species, an album by U.K. Subs, 1982
- Endangered Species, an album by Black Sun Empire, 2007

=== Songs ===
- "Endangered Species (Tales from the Darkside)", a song by Ice Cube, 1990
- "Endangered Species", a song by Sepultura from Roots, 1996
- "Endangered Species", a song by Wayne Shorter and Joseph Vitarelli from Atlantis, 1985
- "Bop Gun (Endangered Species)", a song by Parliament, 1977
- "Endangered Species", a song by Deep Forest from Music Detected, 2002

== Other uses ==
- Endangered Species (TV series), Canadian 2014 animated TV series
- Zoo Tycoon 2: Endangered Species, a computer game expansion pack
- Endangered species (IUCN status), a conservation status assigned by the IUCN
