= Blue Light Rain =

Studio album by Jazz Is Dead
- Released: 1998
- Genres: Psychedelic music, jam rock, jazz fusion
- Length: 56:27
- Labels: Zebra Records; ZD44009
- Producer: Michael Gaiman

Jazz Is Dead chronology
Blue Light Rain (1998)	Laughing Water (1999)

Blue Light Rain is the debut album by the instrumental Grateful Dead cover band Jazz Is Dead. It was released in 1998 by Zebra Records. The album features guitarist Jimmy Herring, keyboard player T. Lavitz, bassist Alphonso Johnson, and drummer Billy Cobham.

The album title can be found in a line from the song "Unbroken Chain": "Blue light rain, whoa, unbroken chain / Looking for familiar faces in an empty window pane".

== Reception ==
Professional ratings
Review scores
Source	Rating
AllMusic	4.5/5 stars

In a review for AllMusic, Jim Newsom wrote: "Longtime Dead listeners will recognize most of the melodies, but the arrangements and solos by this amazing quartet transform the originals... it is one of the most remarkable studio recordings to fall under the often-maligned jazz-rock fusion banner in many a year... Through this project, they and their bandmates bring musical adventurousness, rhythmic complexity and instrumental virtuosity to a whole new generation, while rekindling the spark in those who were around for fusion's heyday 25 years earlier. With Blue Light Rain, Jazz Is Dead affirms that this music anything but."

John M. Moran of the Hartford Courant called the album "a mildly pleasing but ultimately unsatisfying collection of jazz-tinged instrumentals," and noted: "Jazz is Dead falls short by sticking too closely to the Dead's original melodies and arrangements." However, he concluded: "While their studio work could use a lot more spark, it wouldn't be surprising to find Jazz is Dead delivers a fireball of a live performance on these tunes."

== Track listing ==
1. "Crazy Fingers" (Jerry Garcia, Robert Hunter) – 8:39
2. "Unbroken Chain" (Phil Lesh, Robert Petersen) – 6:32
3. "Scarlet Begonias" (Jerry Garcia, Robert Hunter) – 5:00
4. "Dark Star" (Bill Kreutzmann, Bob Weir, Jerry Garcia, Mickey Hart, Phil Lesh, Robert Hunter, Ron McKernan) – 9:08
5. "Red Baron" (Billy Cobham) – 7:39
6. "King Solomon's Marbles" (Bill Kreutzmann, Mickey Hart, Phil Lesh) – 7:50
7. "Blues for Allah Medley: Help on the Way" (Jerry Garcia, Robert Hunter) – 4:19
8. "Blues for Allah Medley: Slipknot!" (Bill Kreutzmann, Bob Weir, Jerry Garcia, Keith Godchaux, Phil Lesh) – 3:56
9. "Blues for Allah Medley: Franklin's Tower" (Bill Kreutzmann, Jerry Garcia, Robert Hunter) – 0:50
10. "Blues for Allah Medley: Spiral Staircase" (Alphonso Johnson, Billy Cobham, Jimmy Herring, T. Lavitz) – 2:47

== Personnel ==
Jazz Is Dead

- Jimmy Herring – guitars
- T. Lavitz – keyboards
- Alphonso Johnson – bass
- Billy Cobham – drums

Production

- Produced by Michael Gaiman
- Executive producers: Ron Rainey, Ricky Schultz
- Recording: David Vanderhaden
- Mixing: Bill Cooper
