= Unnatural Selection =

Unnatural Selection may refer to:

== Literature ==
=== Fiction ===
- Unnatural Selection (Buffy novel), a 1999 novel based on the TV series Buffy the Vampire Slayer
- Unnatural Selection, a 2006 Gideon Oliver novel by Aaron Elkins
- Saurians: Unnatural Selection, a 2002 CrossGen comic book

=== Nonfiction ===
- Unnatural Selection: Why the Geeks Will Inherit the Earth, a 2013 book by Mark Roeder
- Unnatural Selection: Choosing Boys Over Girls, and the Consequences of a World Full of Men, a 2011 book by Mara Hvistendahl
- Unnatural Selection, a 2018 illustrated natural history book by Katrina van Grouw

== Music ==
- Unnatural Selection (Flotsam and Jetsam album), 1999
- Unnatural Selection (Havok album) or the title song, 2013
- "Unnatural Selection", a song by Ayreon from 01011001, 2008
- "Unnatural Selection", a song by Muse from The Resistance, 2009

== Television ==
- Unnatural Selection (TV series), a 2019 Netflix documentary series
- "Unnatural Selection" (The Outer Limits), an episode
- "Unnatural Selection" (Star Trek: The Next Generation), an episode
- "Unnatural Selection" (Stargate SG-1), an episode

== Other uses ==
- Unnatural Selection (film), a 1996 British direct-to-video film in the P.R.O.B.E. series
- Unnatural Selection (video game), a 1993 video game by Maxis

== See also ==
- Natural selection
- Natural Selection (disambiguation)
- Selective breeding
