= Great Sky River (album) =

Live album by Jazz Is Dead
- Released: 2001
- Venue: IMAC Theater, Huntington, New York
- Genre: Psychedelic music, jam rock, jazz fusion
- Length: 1:07:59
- Label: Zebra Records; ZD 44023-2
- Producer: Michael "Gorgo" Gaiman

Jazz Is Dead chronology
Laughing Water (1999)	Great Sky River (2001)	Grateful Jazz (2015)

Great Sky River is a live album by the instrumental Grateful Dead cover band Jazz Is Dead. The band's third release, it was recorded at the IMAC Theater in Huntington, New York, and was issued in 2001 by Zebra Records. The album features guitarist Jimmy Herring, keyboard player T. Lavitz, bassist Alphonso Johnson, and drummer Rod Morgenstein.

== Reception ==
Professional ratings
Review scores
Source	Rating
AllMusic	4.5/5 stars
Sea of Tranquility	5/5 stars

In a review for AllMusic, Paula Edelstein called the album the group's "breakthrough recording," and wrote: "the band plays a powerful, high-energy set that features their rock chops in all their jam band glory... This CD is truly 'live' and a cool 21st century representation of Jerry Garcia and Robert Hunter's ripe rock repertoire."

Todd S. Jenkins of All About Jazz stated that the intuitive interplay between the musicians "has become more uncanny... as they have immersed themselves in the Dead's post-psychedelic canon," and commented: "This is difficult material to revisit convincingly, even if your name is Lesh or Weir. Jazz Is Dead continues to ensure that the music of Garcia and company doesn't fade into foggy, nostalgic oblivion anytime soon."

Writing for Sea of Tranquility, Pete Pardo remarked: "these guys are so tight and bursting with energy that the results are mind boggling... the synergy they demonstrate is almost beyond comprehension... I really can't imagine any serious music lover not being totally blown away by this."

== Track listing ==
1. "China Cat Sunflower" (Jerry Garcia, Robert Hunter) – 5:41
2. "Estimated Prophet" (Bob Weir, John Perry Barlow) – 15:23
3. "St. Stephen/The Eleven" (Jerry Garcia, Phil Lesh, Robert Hunter) – 12:22
4. "Drums & Jam" (Jazz Is Dead) – 4:07
5. "Blues for Allah" (Jerry Garcia, Robert Hunter) – 3:20
6. "Terrapin Station" (Jerry Garcia, Robert Hunter, Mickey Hart, Bill Kreutzman) – 17:40
7. "Morning Dew" (Bonnie Dobson, Tim Rose) – 9:26

== Personnel ==
- Jimmy Herring – guitars
- T. Lavitz – keyboards
- Alphonso Johnson – bass
- Rod Morgenstein – drums
