= Natural Selection (Frank Gambale album) =

Studio album by Frank Gambale
- Released: 2010
- Genre: Jazz
- Length: 61:56
- Label: Wombat
- Producer: Frank Gambale

Frank Gambale chronology
Made in Australia (2007)	Natural Selection (2010)

Natural Selection is an album by guitarist Frank Gambale that was released by Wombat Records in 2010.

== Reception ==
Professional ratings
Review scores
Source	Rating
All About Jazz	3.5/5 stars

In a review for All About Jazz, Jack Huntley stated that the album "covers a varied musical territory but really excels on the more straight-ahead, classic-sounding tracks," and commented: "Throughout... the musicianship is wonderful and the soloists are always interesting. Gambale's style is marvelously flexible in the driving swing on most of this CD and in being so, adds a more melodic sensibility."

== Track listing ==
All tracks are written by Frank Gambale

No.	Title	Length
1.	"Teaser"	6:50
2.	"Smog Eyes"	5:09
3.	"Tones for Chick's Bones"	7:32
4.	"In from Somewhere"	6:41
5.	"Gioia"	7:34
6.	"Good Morning Sunshine"	7:16
7.	"Samba di Somewhere"	6:24
8.	"Natural Selection"	8:01
9.	"Gambashwari"	6:29
Total length:		61:56

== Personnel ==
- Frank Gambale – guitar, mixing, production
- Otmaro Ruíz – piano
- Joel Taylor – percussion
- Alain Caron – bass
