= A Present for the Future =

Studio album by Frank Gambale
- Released: 1987
- Recorded: 11–13 May, 26–30 June 1987
- Studio: Silverlake Sound Studios, Los Angeles
- Genre: Jazz fusion, smooth jazz
- Length: 44:04
- Label: Legato
- Producer: Frank Gambale, Mark Varney

Frank Gambale chronology
Brave New Guitar (1985)	A Present for the Future (1987)	Live! (1989)

Professional ratings
Review scores
Source	Rating
AllMusic	3/5 stars

A Present for the Future is the second studio album by guitarist Frank Gambale, released in 1987 by Legato Records and reissued in 2000 by Wombat Records. The third track, "Stephanie", is renamed "Serenity" on the reissue. Harpist Stephanie Bennett was Gambale's ex-wife and was mentioned in the liner notes of all his albums until Passages (1994).

== Track listing ==
All music is composed by Frank Gambale

No.	Title	Length
1.	"Lazy Passion"	6:04
2.	"Spike's Song"	5:39
3.	"Stephanie"	6:13
4.	"Resident Alien"	5:39
5.	"The Natives Are Restless"	5:57
6.	"Legends"	9:11
7.	"The Tardis"	5:21
Total length:		44:04

== Personnel ==
- Frank Gambale – guitar, guitar synthesizer, keyboard (tracks 1, 4), strings, bass (track 5), mixing, production
- Kei Akagi – keyboard (tracks 2, 7), Rhodes piano
- Tom Coster – keyboard (track 3), synthesizer
- Jack Kelly – drums (except track 6)
- Steve Smith – drums (track 6)
- Steve Reid – percussion
- Steve Kershisnik – bass (except track 5)
- John Patitucci – bass solo (track 6)
- Steve Tavaglione – Steinerphone, tenor saxophone, soprano saxophone, flute
- Stephanie Bennett – electric harp
- Alan Hirshberg – engineering, mixing (track 6)
- Jon Googenheim – engineering
- Robert M. Biles – mixing (except track 6)
- Jeff Sanders – mastering
- Mark Varney – executive production
