= Natural Selection (disambiguation) =

Natural selection is the process by which individual organisms with favorable traits are more likely to survive and reproduce.

Natural Selection may also refer to:

- Natural Selection (manuscript), Charles Darwin's main work on evolution, on which he based his abstract On the Origin of Species

== Film ==
- Teresa's Tattoo, a 1994 film also known as Natural Selection
- Natural Selection (2011 film), an American independent comedy/drama film
- Natural Selection (2016 film), an American drama film

== Music ==
=== Artists ===
- Natural Selection (group), a music group, plus their self-titled album

=== Albums ===
- Natural Selection (Fuel album), 2003
- Natural Selection (Frank Gambale album), 2010
- Natural Selection (Hunters & Collectors album), 2003
- Natural Selections (Brad Laner album), 2010

=== Songs ===
- "Natural Selection", song by Unkle from Where Did the Night Fall
- "Natural Selection", song by Animal Collective from Painting With

== Television ==
- "Natural Selection" (The Spectacular Spider-Man), a 2008 episode of The Spectacular Spider-Man
- "Natural Selection", an episode of The Unit (season 2)

== Video games ==
- Natural Selection (video game), a 2002 modification for the computer game Half-Life
- Natural Selection 2, a 2012 sequel for the 2002 computer game
