= Passages (Frank Gambale album) =

Studio album by Frank Gambale
- Released: 1994
- Studio: Milagro Sound Recorders, Glendale, California
- Genre: Instrumental rock, jazz fusion
- Length: 64:59
- Label: Victor
- Producer: Frank Gambale

Frank Gambale chronology
The Great Explorers (1993)	Passages (1994)	Thinking Out Loud (1995)

Professional ratings
Review scores
Source	Rating
AllMusic	2.5/5 stars

Passages is the sixth studio album by guitarist Frank Gambale, released in 1994 by Victor Entertainment and reissued on 24 April 2001 by Samson Records.

== Track listing ==
All music is composed by Frank Gambale, except where noted

No.	Title	Length
1.	"Little Charmer"	5:38
2.	"6.8 Shaker"	5:52
3.	"Passages"	6:23
4.	"White Room" (Pete Brown, Jack Bruce)	4:05
5.	"D-Day"	4:03
6.	"Nunzio's Near"	5:19
7.	"Free Spirit"	5:07
8.	"One with Everything"	9:14
9.	"Roxana"	5:10
10.	"Uluru"	5:57
11.	"Another Alternative"	8:11
Total length:		64:59

== Personnel ==
- Frank Gambale – vocals, guitar, mixing, producer
- Otmaro Ruíz – synthesizer, Hammond organ
- Walfredo Reyes, Jr. – drums, percussion
- Alphonso Johnson – bass
- Brandon Fields – saxophone
- Robert M. Biles – engineering, mixing
- Matt Stephens – engineering assistance
- Tim Mariner – engineering assistance
- Alan Yoshida – mastering
- Akira Taguchi – executive producer
