= Live Worship =

Live Worship may refer to:

- Live Worship: Blessed Be Your Name, an album Rebecca St. James
- Live Worship with Tommy Walker
