= Laughing Water =

Live album by Jazz Is Dead
- Released: 1999
- Recorded: April 13 and 14, 1999; April 23 and 24, 1999
- Venue: Fox Theater, Boulder, Colorado; Maritime Hall, San Francisco, California
- Genre: Psychedelic music, jam rock, jazz fusion
- Length: 63:29
- Label: Zebra Records; ZD 44019-2
- Producer: Michael Gaiman

Jazz Is Dead chronology
Blue Light Rain (1998)	Laughing Water (1999)	Great Sky River (2001)

Laughing Water is a live album by the instrumental Grateful Dead cover band Jazz Is Dead. Subtitled Wake of the Flood Revisited, it is a reinterpretation of the Grateful Dead's 1973 album. It was JID's second release, and was recorded in April 1999 at the Fox Theater in Boulder, Colorado, and Maritime Hall, in San Francisco, California, and issued later that year by Zebra Records. The album features guitarist Jimmy Herring, keyboard player T. Lavitz, bassist Alphonso Johnson, and drummers Rod Morgenstein and Jeff Sipe, along with guest artists Vassar Clements (violin), Donna Jean Godchaux (vocals), Steve Kimock (guitar), and Derek Trucks (slide guitar). (Godchaux and Clements both appeared on Wake of the Flood.)

The album title can be found in a line from the song "Here Comes Sunshine": "Wake of the flood / laughing water / '49 / Get out the pans / don't just stand there dreaming / get out the way / get out the way". Lyricist Robert Hunter's notes read: "Remembering the great Vanport, Washington, flood of 1949, living in other people's homes, a family abandoned by father; second grade."

== Reception ==
Professional ratings
Review scores
Source	Rating
AllMusic	3/5 stars
All About Jazz	4/5 stars

In a review for The Washington Post, Geoffrey Himes wrote: "There's plenty of juicy melodic material here... guitarist Jimmy Herring... is able to capture both the vocal line and the lead-guitar line and then weave them into something entirely new."

Hilarie Grey, writing for Jazz Times, stated: "the group... punches up the intricate work of Garcia, Weir and company and sets it spinning in unexpected directions, playing out the original themes and threads... Perhaps the most satisfying aspect of this thoroughly non-standard tribute work is the quintet's ability to capture the electricity and emotion of the Dead's grand live improvisations."

A reviewer for CMJ New Music Report commented: "given that the players are consummate professionals, and the Dead's own reputation for experimentation and improvisation, it's a match made in heaven."

In an article for All About Jazz, Glenn Astarita wrote: "Fine production, audiophile sound quality, clever arrangements and sagacious ensemble work make Laughing Water a laudable effort. This one should 'not' disappoint deadheads and serious minded rockers alike... Recommended!!!" In separate AAJ reviews, Paula Edelstein praised the group's "flawless musicianship and wicked jazz-rock fusion," while Ed Kopp noted that Laughing Water "manages to capture the rock 'n roll animus of the original. The communal carefree spirit of tie-died counterculturalism lives on in this music."

== Track listing ==
1. "Vocal Intro" / "Mississippi Half-Step Uptown Toodleoo" (Jerry Garcia, Robert Hunter) – 6:06
2. "Let Me Sing Your Blues Away" (Keith Godchaux, Robert Hunter) – 5:50
3. "Row Jimmy" (Jerry Garcia, Robert Hunter) – 7:53
4. "Stella Blue" (Jerry Garcia, Robert Hunter) – 7:07
5. "Vocal Intro" / "Here Comes Sunshine" / "Sunshine Jam" (Jerry Garcia, Robert Hunter / Jimmy Herring, Alphonso Johnson, T. Lavitz, Jeff Sipe) – 13:02
6. "Eyes of the World" / "Two Sisters" (Jerry Garcia, Robert Hunter / Alphonso Johnson) – 10:08
7. "Weather Report Suite, Part 1" (Bob Weir, Eric Andersen) – 5:26
8. "Weather Report Suite, Part 2: Let It Grow" (Bob Weir, John Perry Barlow) – 7:11

== Personnel ==
- Jimmy Herring – guitars
- T. Lavitz – keyboards
- Alphonso Johnson – bass
- Rod Morgenstein – drums (tracks 2, 4, 6, and 7)
- Jeff Sipe – drums (tracks 1, 3, 5, 6, and 8)

== Special guests ==
- Vassar Clements – violin (tracks 1 and 5)
- Donna Jean Godchaux – vocals on intros to "Mississippi Half-Step Uptown Toodleoo" and "Here Comes Sunshine"
- Steve Kimock – guitar (track 4)
- Derek Trucks – slide guitar (tracks 3 and 5)
