= Stephanie Bennett (harpist) =

American harpist

- Born: Stephanie Bennett
- Other name: Stephanie Pelz
- Occupations: Singer-songwriter; musician

Stephanie Bennett is a harpist, composer, arranger and vocalist who lives in Los Angeles. She plays popular music, jazz, and other contemporary music genres.

== Early life and education ==
Stephanie Pelz was born to doctors Edith and Donald Pelz in Ann Arbour, Michigan. She attended Huron High School in Ann Arbour. She studied classical harp performance with Ruth Dean Clark and composition with Leslie Bassett and Ross Lee Finney at the University of Michigan, graduating in 1976. While at university she was named a James B Angell scholar. She continued her music studies at the Dick Grove School of Music and at UCLA Extension.

== Career ==
Bennett has performed in the United States, Japan, Australia, Brazil, Argentina, Chile, Ecuador, Guatemala, Costa Rica, Uruguay, Panama, France and Switzerland, including solo harp performances of her own compositions at the Montreux Jazz Festival (Switzerland), as a guest artist at the International Music Seminars in Montpelier, France, and at the International Conference on Women in Music. She has performed for President Obama, the President of Israel, and the President of Ireland.

In 1984 Bennett joined the American folk-music group The New Christy Minstrels for a U.S. tour. Later the same year she toured as part of the band of R&B artist Bobby Womack, along with frequent guest artist Sly Stone. In 1989, she gave a solo harp performance at the Montreux Jazz Festival in Switzerland. In 1999, she was invited by the Los Angeles World Affairs Council to perform Irish music for the President of Ireland upon the president's visit to Los Angeles.

Bennett lives in the Los Angeles area, where she composes, records and produces her own CDs, composes and produces music that has been heard on television shows such as Bones, Murphy Brown, Party of Five and The Single Guy, and on the feature film A Time For Dancing. She writes musical arrangements for other artists (including arrangements for rocker Ozzy Osbourne, Native American flute player Golana, Celtic fiddler Mary Barton, and New Age ensemble Midnight Skye). She composes chamber music which has been performed by ensembles such as "Entr'amis" (classical harp, flute and viola trio), and "Campanile", (renowned contemporary handbell ensemble).

Bennett plays harp on soundtracks for movies and television, and plays harp on recordings by many other artists, including the The Dixie Chicks, Sir Paul McCartney, LeAnn Rimes, Lamb, Linda Ronstadt, Everlast, Good Charlotte, Beck, Adele, Miyuki Nakajima, and Ray Conniff. She teaches harp students, and writes lyrics which have been recorded by other vocalists, as well as writing music for other vocalists.

She has toured with groups as diverse as R&B legend Bobby Womack, big band Ray Conniff Singers & Orchestra, Persian singing star Dariush, Mexican superstars Vicente & Alejandro Fernandez, and Canadian band Cowboy Celtic. Bennett was part of American balladeer group, The Bards of FoDLA. She produced their album Sacred Oaks (2012) through Harpworld Music Co.

Bennett has appeared onscreen, including:

- TV: American Idol, Celine Dion's 1998 Christmas special, Sinatra, Bones, Murphy Brown, Falcon Crest, Sisters and Picket Fences
- Film: The Sweetest Thing, The Other Sister, Love Affair, Gypsy, Cobb, A Romantic Christmas by John Tesh,
- Music videos: Trisha Yearwood, Aerosmith

== Honors ==
In 1979, Bennett won first prize in the Second Salvi International Competition of Jazz and Pop Harp. The Hollywood Reporter has called her "one of our country's top harpists".

== Discography ==
=== Recording artist ===
Year	Album	Artist
1987	A Present for the Future	Frank Gambale
1991	'S Always Conniff	Ray Conniff
1992	So You Fell in Love with a Musician...	Pat Smear
1995	40th Anniversary	Ray Conniff
1997	I Love Movies	Ray Conniff
1997	Live in Rio	Ray Conniff
1998	My Way	Ray Conniff
1999	'S Country	Ray Conniff
1999	'S Christmas	Ray Conniff
1999	The Wedding Album	Northsound Music
2000	Eat at Whitey's	Everlast
2002	Sea Change	Beck
2002	Twisted Angel	LeAnn Rimes
2003	Between Darkness and Wonder	Lamb
2004	The Chronicles of Life and Death	Good Charlotte
2004	Unicorn's Journey (Harp and Grand Piano for relaxation and meditation)	Wrightwood Records
2005	Chaos and Creation in the Backyard	Paul McCartney
2006	Taking the Long Way	The Dixie Chicks
	A Merry Little Christmas	Linda Ronstadt
2006	Bat Out of Hell III: The Monster Is Loose	Meat Loaf
2006	The Best Day Ever	SpongeBob SquarePants
2007	World of Warcraft Taverns of Azeroth	David Arkenstone
2011	21	Adele
2011	Sing it for Japan	My Chemical Romance
	Celtic Romance	David Arkenstone
	High Plateaux	Rubaja & Hernandez
	New Land	Bernardo Rubaja
	Christmas Collection Volume 2	Narada Records
	Like the Wind	James Durst
	La Belle Dame	Susan Craig Winsberg
	Celtic Love Songs	Susan Craig Winsberg
	A Child is Born	Midnight Skye
	Celtic Music for Stress Relief	Lifescapes
	Harmony (previously Music from Big Sur)	Michael Benghiat
	Juan Gabriel	BMG Latin
	Fairy Ring	Miyuki Nakajima
	Walk Between Worlds	Golana
	Moon of First Snow	Golana
	Shots in the Dark	Del-Fi Records
	Songs of a Wondering Minstrel	James Durst
	New Life	Prince Diabate
	Celtic Music for Stress Relief	Lifescapes

=== Producer ===
Year	Album	Notes
1990	Stories Seldom Told	Harpworld Music Co.
1993	Imaginocean	Harpworld Music Co.
1999	Bardina's Forest	Harpworld Music Co
2000	Avalon: Celtic Music for Relaxation	At Peace Music
2003	Lumiere: Baroque Music for Relaxation	At Peace Music
2009	Voyage of the Dreamer	Harpworld Music Co.

=== Composer and arranger ===
Year	Album	Artist	Detail
1998	A Child Is Born	Midnight Skye	Arrangement
1999	Walk Between Worlds	Golana, Oginali	Arrangement
1999	La Belle Dame	Susan Craig Winsberg	Arrangement
1999	Changing Seasons	Mary Barton	Arrangement
2000	Celtic Cello	Marston Smith	Arrangement
2000	Nocturnal Journeys	Campanile	Composition
2002	Moon of First Snow	Golana, Oginali	Arrangement
	White Chocolate	Campanile	Composition
	America Speaks From the Heart	Centurion Productions	Composition
	Murphy Brown	TV show	Composition for two episodes
	The Single Guy	TV show	Composition
	A Time for Dreaming	Film	Composition

Bennett also wrote lyrics which appeared on two albums, Note Worker and Thunder from Down Under, by Frank Gambale.
