= School of the Arts (album) =

Studio album by School of the Arts featuring T Lavitz
- Released: 2007
- Recorded: 2007
- Genre: Jazz fusion
- Length: 59:33
- Label: Magnatude Records; MT-2315-2
- Producer: T Lavitz

School of the Arts is the debut album by the group of the same name, founded and led by keyboardist T Lavitz. It was recorded in 2007, and was released later that year by Magnatude Records. On the album, which was the group's sole release, and which features mostly acoustic instruments, Lavitz is joined by guitarists Frank Gambale and Steve Morse, violinist Jerry Goodman, bassist John Patitucci, and drummer Dave Weckl.

== Reception ==
Professional ratings
Review scores
Source	Rating
All About Jazz	4/5 stars
All About Jazz	3/5 stars

A reviewer for AllMusic wrote that the group "throws everything into the pot: jazz, rock, blues, country, Latin, and classical, but this wide-ranging eclecticism works remarkably well... While there's no shortage of chops... there's also an impressive interplay and sympathy, making School of the Arts a fusion lover's dream come true."

John Kelman of All About Jazz stated: "the pianist is the real revelation here. His cohorts' reputations are all well-established, but with School of the Arts Lavitz finally emerges as an inventive writer, pianist and bandleader. Hopefully there'll be more to come." AAJ's Ian Patterson commented: "Lavitz, in stellar company, has produced something of a rarity; an acoustic album with the vitality of electric fusion, and feel-good tunes which are a celebration of the joy of playing."

Bill Meredith, writing for Jazz Times, remarked: "Lavitz seemed to realize that an electric fusion outing by this cast would be deemed predictable, so outside of the occasional electric violin by Jerry Goodman and bass by John Patitucci, he went all acoustic. That element of surprise, and musical chemistry... make for inspired playing."

In an article for Contemporary Jazz, John Hilderbrand wrote: "School of the Arts is Lavitz's most straight ahead recording since 1991's Mood Swings, and in my opinion, his strongest session in a long time... In a year of some very interesting and good recordings, this may be my #1 pick. If you like your jazz cerebral and muscular, then School of the Arts is a keeper."

Writing for Sea of Tranquility, Michael Popke stated: "these extraordinary players are given room to stretch – although none of them steals the spotlight. In fact, this happens to be a complete collaborative effort that often sounds improvised, and the musical interplay makes it seem as if these guys have been playing together their whole lives."

== Track listing ==
Composed by T Lavitz.

1. "Fairweather Green" – 5:29
2. "No Time Flat" – 4:49
3. "On Fire" – 4:54
4. "Portrait" – 6:19
5. "Like This" – 4:55
6. "High Falutin' Blues" – 5:10
7. "Gambashwari" – 5:03
8. "Dinosaur Dance" – 6:09
9. "Teaser" – 5:09
10. "A Little Mouse Music" – 7:41
11. "Maybe Next Time" – 3:58

== Personnel ==
- T Lavitz – piano, bass
- Frank Gambale – acoustic guitar (tracks 1, 2, 5–11)
- Steve Morse – acoustic guitar (tracks 3 and 4)
- Jerry Goodman – violin (tracks 2, 5, and 8)
- John Patitucci – bass
- Dave Weckl – drums, percussion
