= The Great Explorers =

Studio album by Frank Gambale
- Released: 1993
- Recorded: Milagro Sound Recorders in Glendale, California; Silverlake Sound Studios in Los Angeles
- Genre: Instrumental rock, jazz fusion
- Length: 51:41
- Label: Victor
- Producer: Frank Gambale, Takashi Misu

Frank Gambale chronology
Note Worker (1991)	The Great Explorers (1993)	Passages (1994)

Professional ratings
Review scores
Source	Rating
AllMusic	4/5 stars

The Great Explorers is the fifth studio album by guitarist Frank Gambale, released in 1993 through Victor Entertainment and reissued on 24 April 2001 through Samson Records.

== Track listing ==
All music is composed by Frank Gambale, except where noted

No.	Title	Length
1.	"Frankly Speaking"	5:33
2.	"The Final Frontier"	4:53
3.	"The Jaguar" (Gambale, Gary Hoey)	4:13
4.	"The Great Explorers"	5:48
5.	"Duet Tuet"	0:44
6.	"She Knows Me Well" (Gambale, Gary Hoey)	4:34
7.	"Thunder Current"	6:11
8.	"Pathfinder"	4:19
9.	"Dawn Over the Nullarbor"	4:43
10.	"Cruising Altitude"	4:45
11.	"Naughty Business"	5:58
Total length:		51:41

== Personnel ==
- Frank Gambale – guitar, electric sitar, synthesizer melody (track 11), sequencing, drum programming (track 9), drums (track 10), bass (track 10), spoken vocals, mixing, production
- Freddie Ravel – keyboard, Hammond organ (track 3), synthesizer solo (track 11), piano
- Tom Coster – Hammond organ (tracks 2, 11)
- Jonathan Mover – drums (except track 10), cymbals (track 9)
- Stuart Hamm – bass (except track 10)
- Robert M. Biles – engineering, mixing (except tracks 2, 3, 6)
- Chris Wood – engineering assistance
- Darren Mora – engineering assistance
- Walter Spencer – engineering assistance
- Tony Cornejo – engineering assistance
- Kevin Davis – engineering assistance
- Micajah Ryan – mixing (tracks 2, 3, 6)
- Bernie Grundman – mastering
- Takashi Misu – executive production
