= Brian Bromberg =

American jazz bassist and record producer (born 1960)

- Born: Brian Bromberg; December 5, 1960 (age 65)
- Origin: Tucson, Arizona, U.S.
- Genres: Straight-ahead jazz, jazz fusion, smooth jazz, instrumental rock
- Occupations: Musician, record producer
- Instruments: Double bass, electric bass, electric upright bass, piccolo bass, whistling

Brian Bromberg (born December 5, 1960) is an American jazz bassist and record producer. Bromberg plays and performs on both the double bass and on a variety of electric basses.

== Biography ==
Bromberg was born on December 5, 1960, in Tucson, Arizona. His father and brother both played drums, which influenced him to take up the instrument, and at the age of 13 he began seriously pursuing a career as a drummer. Around this time, the leader of his school orchestra steered him towards the upright bass. From then on, he committed himself to a strict practice regimen and "tested out of high school early" because of the rigorous schedule he set for himself.

Bromberg felt it was essential to gain experience playing live and he accepted virtually every gig he could get. He often played "five to seven nights a week with several different bands." In 1979, Marc Johnson, the bassist working with jazz pianist Bill Evans, heard Bromberg's playing and recommended him to saxophonist Stan Getz, who needed a new bass player. Getz auditioned Bromberg and hired him, and at the age of 19, with only six years of experience on the bass, he found himself touring internationally. Bromberg later worked with other big names in the music business, and become a producer for artists in his genre.

In March 2011, Bromberg partnered with Carvin Guitars to produce a signature model electric bass. The B24 and B25 were based on his own design, which had previously been manufactured by Peavey and Dean. In 2014, Carvin rebranded to Kiesel for most new instruments, and the Brian Bromberg model followed suit in 2015.

== Releases as a solo artist ==
Bromberg's early albums were in the smooth jazz genre and his first two, New Day 1986) and Basses Loaded (1988), caught the attention of smooth jazz radio. His third album, Magic Rain (1989) "became the most played album on smooth jazz radio during the first week of its release". Bromberg's fourth record, BASSically Speaking, consisted of his oldest material re-mastered with new additions, and reached the top 5 on the radio charts and No. 7 on the Billboard sales charts.

In 1991 he put out a straightforward jazz album, It's About Time, The Acoustic Project, which reached number four on the mainstream jazz charts. He also recorded in a trio with Freddie Hubbard and Ernie Watts. After It's About Time, he returned to smooth jazz and released Brian Bromberg in 1993. The label went out of business in the week it was released.

Bromberg took a break from recording to design basses for Peavey and tour as a clinician, In 1991 he signed with Zebra Records. In February 1998, he released a new album, You Know That Feeling, recorded with Rick Braun, Joe Sample, Jeff Lorber, and Everette Harp. It became his most successful yet and was the first smooth jazz number one record of his career, producing three singles in a row that each went to number three on the charts. The album spent seventeen consecutive months on the charts, eight months in the top ten, and nearly six months in the top five. It was the fifth most-played smooth jazz album of the year. Songs from You Know That Feeling are still played on smooth jazz stations across America.

After You Know That Feeling, Bromberg's albums moved on from his smooth jazz roots. Wood (2002), produced by a Japanese label, was recorded with pianist Randy Waldman and brother David Bromberg on drums. In addition to the solo pieces, Wood and Wood 2 (with drummer Vinnie Colaiuta replacing David Bromberg) contain interpretations of music by Wayne Shorter and Woody Herman. In 2003, Bromberg made a record titled Jaco, in which he performed Jaco Pastorius songs. Two Years later (in 2005) he released Metal with drummer Joel Taylor.

Bromberg uses a piccolo bass on some of his recordings for melody lines instead of six-string guitars. This unusual instrumentation, tuned an octave higher than usual, is explained in the liner notes. "There are no guitar melodies or solos on this recording. All guitar-sounding parts are played on piccolo bass".

Bromberg has produced eight top-ten hits, seven top-five hits, and two number-one hits. He plays a 300-year-old double bass and also uses Dean, Bob Mick, Knooren Handcrafted Instruments, Mick Donner and Peavey basses with Epifani amplification. He owns a signature edition Carvin bass.

== Releases with the JB Project ==
In 2003 Bromberg formed The JB Project with Jazz Fusion drummer Akira Jimbo. Their first release Brombo! was published in 2003, featuring Otmaro Ruíz on piano, and contained a mixture of classical music (Ode To Joy by Beethoven), Jazz standards (Giant Steps by John Coltrane, So What by Miles Davis), Contemporary/Pop piecew (Mambo No. 5 by Pérez Prado, And I Love Her by John Lennon & Paul McCartney), as well as their own material. A second release, Brombo II!!, followed in 2004, and a third, Brombo III!!!, in 2017. On this album, piano players Patrice Rushen and Jeff Lorber can be heard, in addition to Otmaro Ruíz, who played on all three JB Project albums.

== Discography ==
=== Albums ===
Year	Album	Peak chart positions			Label
Year	Album	US Jazz	US Con. Jazz	US Trad Jazz	Label
1986	A New Day	—	—	—	BlackHawk
1988	Basses Loaded	—	—	—	Intima
1989	Magic Rain	—	—	—	Intima
1990	BASSically Speaking	—	7	—	Nova
1991	It's About Time: The Acoustic Project	—	—	—	Nova
1993	Brian Bromberg	—	—	—	Nova
1997	You Know That Feeling	40	—	—	Zebra
2002	Wood	45	—	15	A440
2002	Jaco	—	—	—	A440
2003	Choices	30	—	13	A440
2004	Brombo! – (Japan release) – (JB Project)	—	—	—	Seven Seas
2004	Bass Freak Out – (Japan release)	—	—	—	Seven Seas
2004	Brombo II!! – (Japan release) – (JB Project)	—	—	—	Seven Seas
2005	Metal	—	—	—	Artistry
2006	Wood II	47	—	19	Artistry
2007	Downright Upright	22	—	14	Artistry
2009	Hands – (Japan release)	—	—	—	Seven Seas
2009	It Is What It Is	19	7	—	Artistry
2012	Compared to That	19	9	—	Artistry
2012	Bromberg Plays Hendrix	17	9	—	Artistry
2012	In the Spirit of Jobim	37	—	17	Artistry
2016	Full Circle	21	—	—	Artistry
2017	Brombo III!!! – (Japan release) – (JB Project)	—	—	—	Seven Seas
2018	Thicker Than Water	9	6	—	Artistry
2020	Celebrate Me Home: The Holiday Sessions	—	—	—	Artistry
2020	Bromberg Plays Hendrix – (2020 Remix and Remastered)	—	—	—	Artistry
2021	A Little Driving Music	—	—	—	Artistry
2023	The Magic of Moonlight	—	—	—	Artistry
2024	LaFaro – (Japan release)	—	—	—	Seven Seas
2024	Seriously – (BPM: Brian Bromberg, Paul Brown and Michael Paulo)	—	—	—	Shanachie
"—" denotes a recording that did not chart.

=== Singles ===
Year	Title	Peak chart positions	Album
Year	Title	Smooth Jazz Airplay	Album
2007	"Cantaloupe Island"	3	Downright Upright
2009	"The Anticipation"	16	It Is What It Is
2010	"Mr. Miller"	13	It Is What It Is
2010	"Saul Goode"	13	It Is What It Is
2012	"Does Anybody Really Know What Time It Is?"	5	Compared to That
2013	"Compared to That"	20	Compared to That
2013	"Ellen"	9	In the Spirit of Jobim
2016	"Havana Nights (aka Havana Nagila)"	26	Full Circle
2018	"Coupe De Ville"	1	Thicker Than Water
2019	"Thicker Than Water"	10	Thicker Than Water
2019	"Minneapolis, 1987"	14	Thicker Than Water
2020	"The Wind Cries Mary"	27	Bromberg Plays Hendrix (2020 Remix and Remastered)
2023	"Nico's Groove"	26	The Magic of Moonlight
2024	"Seriously?" (BPM: Brian Bromberg, Paul Brown and Michael Paulo)	15	Seriously
2025	"Eastside Party" (BPM: Brian Bromberg, Paul Brown and Michael Paulo)	15	Seriously
2026	"Gridlock" (BPM: Brian Bromberg, Paul Brown and Michael Paulo)	1	Seriously
