= T Time =

Studio album by Stanley Turrentine
- Released: 1995
- Recorded: 1995
- Studio: Omega Studios, Rockville, MD
- Genre: Jazz
- Length: 48:27
- Label: MusicMasters; 65124-2
- Producer: Alan Abrahams

Stanley Turrentine chronology
If I Could (1993)	T Time (1995)	Do You Have Any Sugar? (1999)

T Time is an album by saxophonist Stanley Turrentine recorded in 1995 and released by the MusicMasters label.

The newly-recorded small-group set contains a mix of pieces from throughout the then-61-year-old saxophonist's career: four songs from Turrentine's 1970s days on the CTI label (Don't Mess with Mister T., A Little Sweetness aka Sugar, I Haven't Got Anything Better To Do, and Impressions), a bossa from 1979 (The Island), two songs from his 1989 penultimate major label release La Place (Terrible T. and Touching), and a new original by longtime sideman Dave Stryker (Side Steppin').

== Reception ==
Professional ratings
Review scores
Source	Rating
AllMusic	3/5 stars

AllMusic reviewer Scott Yanow stated "Modern, small-group Turrentine. He plays the horn like few others, but this is not in the style of his vintage soul stuff".

== Track listing ==
1. "Don't Mess With Mister T." (Marvin Gaye) – 6:10
2. "A Little Sweetness" (Stanley Turrentine) – 6:21
3. "I Haven't Got Anything Better to Do" (Lee Pockriss, Paul Vance) – 5:33
4. "Impressions" (John Coltrane) – 7:56
5. "Terrible T." (Turrentine, Bobby Lyle) – 4:40
6. "The Island" (Ivan Lins, Vítor Martins) – 6:03
7. "Touching" (Turrentine, Lyle) – 6:53
8. "Side Steppin'" (Dave Stryker) – 4:51

== Personnel ==
- Stanley Turrentine – tenor saxophone
- Kenny Drew Jr. – piano, B-3 organ, keyboards
- Dave Stryker – guitar
- Dwayne Dolphin – acoustic bass, electric bass
- Mark Johnson – drums
- Alfredo Mojica – percussion (tracks 2 & 6)
