= Boston T Party =

Studio album by Dennis Chambers, Jeff Berlin, David Fiuczynski, and T Lavitz
- Released: 2006
- Recorded: September 2005
- Studio: Wellspring Sound, Acton, Massachusetts; Media Central Studios, Brandon, Florida
- Genre: Jazz fusion
- Length: 59:13
- Label: Mascot; TC 40432
- Producer: T Lavitz

Boston T Party is an album by drummer Dennis Chambers, bassist Jeff Berlin, guitarist David Fiuczynski, and keyboardist T Lavitz. It was recorded in Massachusetts and Florida during September 2005, and was released in 2006 by Mascot Records.

== Reception ==
Professional ratings
Review scores
Source	Rating
AllMusic	4/5 stars
All About Jazz	4/5 stars
PopMatters	6/10 stars

In a review for AllMusic, Scott Yanow wrote: "Keyboardist T Lavitz heads an all-star quartet and composed most of the material heard here, music that is full of intensity, fire, constant interplay between the players, and passion. Although there are some brilliant solos, the main significance to this music is how the four musicians all fit together and form exciting ensembles."

Woodrow Wilkins of All About Jazz described the music as "quirky, wild, and most of all, fun," and stated: "The quartet delivers a musical smorgasbord. There's a bit of rock, accented by jazz, fusion, funk and other assorted sounds—sometimes all within a single track... Chambers delivers some strong licks without getting in the way of his bandmates' solos... keeping within the structure but at the same time playing with freedom to explore. The same can be said of all the musicians throughout the album."

Writing for PopMatters, Robert R. Calder commented: "everything’s aimed at viscerally emotive effects... These guys play on their pulses, and rather than settling into one or another line or specifiable range of development the music can change or move in an enormous range of ways."

In an article for Jazz Times, Mike Shanley remarked: "Boston T Party is built around writing as much as blowing... The group acts as a supportive environment to inspire the soloist without overplaying."

Sea of Tranquility's Pete Pardo wrote: "Boston T Party is a funky, jazzy, & rockin' good time from start to finish... the album is a treat for fusion fans and lets the band show their instrumental prowess and at the same time crank out some solid melodies... If you like modern day fusion with an aggressive edge, Boston T Party will be right up your alley."

== Track listing ==
1. "D'funk'd" (T Lavitz) – 6:25
2. "(Great) Ball of Issues" (T Lavitz) – 5:39
3. "Around About Way" (T Lavitz) – 6:41
4. "I Hate the Blues...(But Here's One Anyway)" (Jeff Berlin) – 5:56
5. "All Thought Out" (T Lavitz) – 6:46
6. "Emotional Squalor" (T Lavitz) – 8:26
7. "Deff 184" (Jeff Berlin, Dennis Chambers, T Lavitz) – 1:46
8. "Last Trane" (Dave Fiuczynski) – 3:10
9. "Constant Comment" (T Lavitz) – 7:46
10. "Foxy Morons" (Jeff Berlin) – 6:38

== Personnel ==
- David Fiuczynski – fretted guitar, fretless guitar, 1/4 tone guitar
- T Lavitz – keyboards
- Jeff Berlin – bass
- Dennis Chambers – drums
