= Do You Have Any Sugar? =

Studio album by Stanley Turrentine
- Released: 1999
- Recorded: February 8, 9, 10-12, 1999
- Studios: Capitol Studio A, Hollywood, California (Tracks 1, 2, 5-7, 10, 11). Mad Hatter Studios, Los Angeles, California (Tracks 3, 4 , 8, 9)
- Genres: Jazz, hard bop, soul jazz
- Length: 59:01
- Label: Concord Vista 65124-2
- Producer: John Burk

Stanley Turrentine chronology
T Time (1995)	Do You Have Any Sugar? (1999)

Do You Have Any Sugar? is a studio album by saxophonist Stanley Turrentine recorded in 1999 and his debut for the Concord Vista label. This was his first disc since 1995 and the last album recorded by Turrentine as a leader.

He sticks to differing small groups throughout, supported by electric instrumentation (bass, guitar or keyboards). On some tracks, he's paired with a complimentary horn (in this case, Andy Martin's trombone or Rick Braun's trumpet, as well as singer Niki Haris on three themes.

According to Nat Hentoff liner notes for this album, Turrentine stated regarding this date: "I wanted to go back in spirit to the sounds and concepts of the 1960's and then move through the '70s and '80s into what's happening now."

== Reception ==
Professional ratings
Review scores
Source	Rating
AllMusic	2.5/5 stars

AllMusic reviewer Stephen Thomas Erlewine stated "Stanley Turrentine still has a sweeter sound than any other saxophonist, even at the age of 65" and "aficionados will delight in certain phrases he turns out -he remains an excellent saxophonist, after all- but the album overall makes little impact."

For Doug Payne from All About Jazz, Turrentine is here in a top form and his "precision soulfulness remains impeccable throughout, even when the music threatens to become a bit too smooth."

== Track listing ==
1. "Keep On Keepin' On" (Stephen Boyd, Chuck Hoover) – 5:00
2. "Do You Have Any Sugar?" (Stephen Boyd, Stanley Turrentine, Rob Trow) – 5:10
3. "Stuff you Gotta Watch" (Stephen Boyd, Chuck Hoover) – 6:17
4. "Far Too Little Love" (Stephen Boyd, Chuck Hoover) – 5:40
5. "Pause To Wonder" (Stephen Boyd, John Murphy) – 4:28
6. "Favorite Heart" (Stephen Boyd, John Murphy) – 5:36
7. "Calling You" (Robert Telson) – 5:27
8. "Back In The Day" (Stanley Turrentine) – 7:42
9. "2 RBs" (Ray Brown) – 4:41
10. "Monte Cristo" (Harvey Mason, Mark Portmann) – 4:48
11. "Bar Fly" (Stephen Boyd, Chuck Hoover) – 6:12

== Personnel ==
- Stanley Turrentine – tenor saxophone
- Niki Haris – voice (Tracks 2, 5, 7)
- Andy Martin – trombone (Tracks 1, 8, 11)
- Rick Braun – trumpet (Track 3)
- Kei Akagi – piano (tracks 1, 11)
- Mike Miller – electric guitar (tracks 1, 2, 5–7, 10, 11)
- Abe Laboriel – electric bass (tracks 1, 2, 5–7, 10, 11)
- Harvey Mason – drums (tracks 1–11)
- Alex Acuña – percussion (tracks 1, 3, 5–7, 11)
- Greg Phillinganes – keyboards (tracks 2, 5, 7, 10)
- Stephen Boyd – keyboards (tracks 2, 5, 7)
- Joe Sample – piano (tracks 3, 4, 8, 9)
- Ray Brown – bass (tracks 3, 4, 8, 9)
- Wayne Boyer – backing vocals (track 5)
- Paula Stapleton – backing vocals (track 5)

== Production ==
- John Burk – producer
- Stephen Boyd – associate producer and arranger
- Glen Barros – executive producer
- Bernie Kirsh – audio engineer and mixing
- Alan Yoshida – mastering
- Darlene Barbaria – art direction and design
- Carl Studna – photography
