= Raison D'être (album) =

Studio album by Frank Gambale
- Released: 13 April 2004
- Recorded: December 2003 – January 2004
- Studios: Backroom Studios, Glendale, California
- Genres: Jazz fusion, jazz
- Length: 68:35
- Label: Wombat
- Producer: Frank Gambale

Frank Gambale chronology
Absolutely Live - In Poland (2002)	Raison D'être (2004)	Natural High (2006)

Alternative cover

Professional ratings
Review scores
Source	Rating
AllMusic	3/5 stars

Raison D'être is the ninth studio album by jazz guitarist Frank Gambale, released on 13 April 2004 by Wombat Records.

== Track listing ==
All tracks are written by Frank Gambale.

No.	Title	Length
1.	"Foreign Country"	6:56
2.	"Cachination"	5:52
3.	"Bittersweet"	8:17
4.	"Table for One"	6:42
5.	"Nouveau Vignettes: Debut Solo"	1:25
6.	"Nouveau Vignettes: Melodique"	1:10
7.	"Nouveau Vignettes: Two Minutes B.C."	1:57
8.	"Ka'anapali"	6:37
9.	"May the Fourths Be With You"	7:03
10.	"Monkey Wrench"	5:51
11.	"Smug"	6:25
12.	"Complex Emotions"	10:20
Total length:		68:35

== Personnel ==
Credits adapted from CD edition liner notes:

- Frank Gambale – guitar, arrangement, mixing, production, executive production
- Billy Cobham – drums, percussion
- Ric Fierabracci – bass
- Steve Billman – bass
- Robert M. Biles – engineering, mixing
- Dave Frederic – engineering
- Joe Gastwirt – mastering
