= Natural High (Frank Gambale album) =

Studio album by Frank Gambale
- Released: 7 February 2006
- Recorded: March 2005
- Studio: Bob's Hardware, Los Angeles, California
- Genre: Jazz
- Length: 65:12
- Label: Wombat
- Producer: Frank Gambale

Frank Gambale chronology
Raison D'être (2004)	Natural High (2006)	Made in Australia (2007)

Professional ratings
Review scores
Source	Rating
Allmusic	3.5/5 stars

Natural High is an album by jazz guitarist Frank Gambale released on 7 February 2006 by Wombat Records.

== Track listing ==
All tracks are written by Frank Gambale

No.	Title	Length
1.	"You Are All the Things"	7:34
2.	"We'll Remember December"	7:23
3.	"D's Living Room"	7:08
4.	"Fortune"	6:22
5.	"The Long and Short of It"	7:41
6.	"Have You Met Tom Jones?"	7:10
7.	"Principesa"	5:50
8.	"Scottish Highlands"	8:38
9.	"Another Challenger"	7:26
Total length:		65:12

== Personnel ==
- Frank Gambale – guitar, mixing, production
- Otmaro Ruíz – piano
- Mike Shapiro – percussion
- Alain Caron – bass
- Robert M. Biles – engineering, mixing
- Dave Fredrick – audio editing
- Jim Schultz – audio editing
- Bill Dooley – mastering
