= Peppino D'Agostino =

Giuseppe "Peppino" D'Agostino is an Italian-American guitarist. His first two albums, Bluerba and Silk and Steel were recorded in Italy. D'Agostino moved to America in 1985. Starting out by performing in the streets and on Fisherman's Wharf in San Francisco, he graduated to playing in restaurants then clubs, and finally, concert halls and festivals after a fellow musician introduced D’Agostino to a booking agent. He made his American recording debut in 1987 with Acoustic Spirit on Shanachie Records.

== Career ==
D'Agostino was born in 1956.

D’Agostino emerged on the acoustic guitar scene in the late 1980s.

In 1997 he wrote, composed and produced a soundtrack for the feature length Italian movie Ardena, directed by Luca Barbareschi. In 2016 he composed, arranged and recorded the original score for a 15-minute auditorium program for the Monterey Bay Aquarium.

To date Peppino has recorded 18 CD's.

== Discography ==
- Acoustic Spirit (Shanachie, 1986)
- Sparks (Shanachie, 1988)
- Close to the Heart (Mesa, 1993)
- Venus over Venice (Mesa/Bluemoon, 1995)
- A Glimpse of Times Past (Acoustic Music Records, 1998)
- Classic/Steel with David Tanenbaum (2001)
- Every Step of the Way (Favored Nations, 2002)
- Bayshore Road with Stef Burns (Favored Nations, 2005)
- International Guitar Night with Antoine Dufour (Pacific Music, 2006)
- Made in Italy (2008)
- Nine White Kites (2010)
- Begin with Pacific Guitar Ensemble (2012)
- Penumbra (2014)
- For the Beauty of This Wicked World with Corrado Rustici (2019)
- Connexion (2020)
