= Cosmic Farm =

Studio album by Rob Wasserman, Craig Erickson, T Lavitz, and Jeff Sipe
- Released: 2005
- Studios: Prairie Sun Studios, Cotati, California and Route 44, Rohnnert Park, California
- Genre: Jazz fusion
- Length: 49:56
- Labels: Tone Center; TC 4038 2
- Producer: Craig Erickson

Cosmic Farm is an album by bassist Rob Wasserman, guitarist Craig Erickson, keyboardist T Lavitz, and drummer Jeff Sipe. It was recorded in California, and was released in 2005 by Tone Center Records. Bassoonist Paul Hanson also appears on four tracks.

In the album liner notes, Erickson wrote: "we only spent a minimal amount of time to rehearse and record, going for a 'raw play like you feel in the moment' vibe... like the days when there were no stylistic boundary rules, just the freedom to be yourself and have a little fun jamming."

== Reception ==
Professional ratings
Review scores
Source	Rating
AllMusic	3/5 stars
George Graham	A

In a review for AllMusic, Hal Horowitz called the recording "a solid, incredibly well played album," and wrote: "Although released in 2005, it's a knowing throwback to the jazz-rock fusion of '70s acts such as Jeff Beck, John Scofield, Return to Forever, Allan Holdsworth, Dixie Dregs... and any number of similar acts that generally favored instrumental dexterity over the compositional and melodic... There is something rather charming in the retro-ness of the concept since there aren't many jazz fusion albums being released in the mid-'00s."

Producer and reviewer George Graham described the album as "one of those associations that works well, combining first-class musicianship with decent writing and a great spirit of communication among the quartet." He commented: "they bring just the right combination of jam ethic with musical discipline to create a CD that is not too heavy on musical complexity, nor too loose with the solos... Cosmic Farm is a good place for a jam-band fan to start, and it's also a CD likely to be well-received by long-time fusion fans."

== Track listing ==
1. "Steel Rider" (Craig Erickson) – 5:16
2. "Attitude Cat" (Craig Erickson) – 6:46
3. "Heavenly Love" (Craig Erickson) – 6:33
4. "Space Rooster" (Craig Erickson) – 5:21
5. "The Fine Scenery" (Craig Erickson) – 7:15
6. "Interstellar Interlude" (Craig Erickson/Rob Wasserman) – 0:54
7. "Strange Train" (Craig Erickson) – 6:27
8. "Jupiter East" (Craig Erickson/Rob Wasserman) – 1:39
9. "Forecast" (Craig Erickson) – 8:06
10. "Jupiter West" (Craig Erickson/Rob Wasserman) – 1:43

== Personnel ==
- Craig Erickson – guitar
- Rob Wasserman – electric upright bass
- T Lavitz – keyboards
- Jeff Sipe – drums
- Paul Hanson – bassoon (tracks 6–8, 10)
