= Note Worker =

Studio album by Frank Gambale
- Released: 1991
- Studio: Fox Run Studio, Sudbury, Massachusetts; Mad Hatter Studios, Silverlake Sound Studios, Los Angeles
- Genre: Jazz fusion, smooth jazz
- Length: 48:17
- Label: Victor
- Producer: Frank Gambale; Akira Taguchi; Takashi Misu; Ron Moss

Frank Gambale chronology
| Thunder from Down Under (1990) | Note Worker (1991) | The Great Explorers (1993) |

Professional ratings
Review scores
| Source | Rating |
|---|---|
| AllMusic | 1.5/5 stars |

Note Worker is the fourth studio album by guitarist Frank Gambale, released in 1991 through Victor Entertainment.

== Track listing ==
| No. | Title | Lyrics | Music | Length |
|---|---|---|---|---|
| 1. | "Lunar Rotation" | | Frank Gambale | 5:29 |
| 2. | "Mr. Hollywood Line" | Stephanie Bennett, Gambale | Gambale | 5:53 |
| 3. | "Calafia" | Bennett, Gambale | Gambale, Freddie Ravel | 5:00 |
| 4. | "Jet Rag" | | Gambale | 4:48 |
| 5. | "Stay with Me" | Bennett, Gambale | Gambale | 4:55 |
| 6. | "Schmooze" | | Gambale | 5:20 |
| 7. | "High 5" | | Gambale | 6:18 |
| 8. | "Awakening" | | Gambale | 6:30 |
| 9. | "My Silent Heart" | Bennett | Gambale | 4:04 |
| Total length: | | | | 48:17 |

== Personnel ==
- Frank Gambale – vocals, guitar, keyboard (tracks 2, 3, 5), synthesizer (track 4), synthesizer melody (track 1), sequencing (track 1), keyboard bass (track 9), organ, scratching, background vocals (tracks 2, 3, 5), mixing, production
- Freddie Ravel – keyboard (track 2), keyboard composition (track 7), clavinet, synthesizer (tracks 1, 3, 6, 8), string pads (track 5), strings (track 8), piano, horn effects (track 5)
- Kei Akagi – keyboard composition (tracks 1, 6), keyboard strings (track 7), keyboard vibes (tracks 7, 8)
- Dave Weckl – drums (tracks 1, 4–6), electronic drums (track 4)
- Steve Smith – drums (tracks 2, 3, 7, 8)
- Bob Harrison – bass (tracks 1, 5, 6)
- Steve Kershisnik 1– bass (tracks 2, 7)
- Tim Landers – bass (tracks 3, 8)
- Steve Tavaglione – saxophone, EWI
- Walt Fowler – flugelhorn
- Anjani – background vocals (tracks 2, 3, 5)
- Robert Read – engineering
- Darron Mora – engineering
- Bob Oullette – engineering
- Frank Vendetti – engineering
- Robert M. Biles – mixing
- Tim Anderson – fading
- Bernie Grundman – mastering
- Akira Taguchi – executive production
- Takashi Misu – executive production
- Ron Moss – executive production

== Chart performance ==
| Year | Chart | Position |
|---|---|---|
| 1992 | Billboard Contemporary Jazz Albums | 25 |
