= Favored Nations =

American record label

- Founded: 1999
- Founder: Steve Vai, Ray Scherr
- Genre: Rock
- Country of origin: United States
- Location: Encino, California
- Official website: favorednations.com

Favored Nations Entertainment is a record label founded in 1999 by guitarist Steve Vai and Ray Scherr, former owner of Guitar Center.

The first album released by the label was Coming to Your Senses by guitarist Frank Gambale in 2000. Soon after, a diverse range of artists were signed, such as Johnny A., Larry Carlton, Peppino D'Agostino, Marty Friedman, Johnny Hiland, Allan Holdsworth, Eric Johnson, Stanley Jordan, Steve Lukather, Novecento, John Petrucci, Eric Sardinas, Neal Schon, Andy Timmons, Dave Weiner, The Yardbirds, and Dweezil Zappa.

The label expanded with the creation of separate branches, Favored Nations Acoustic in 2002 and Favored Nations Cool in 2004. Pro-Found, a sister label, promotes Favored Nations artists through the Favored Nations and ProFound websites.

== Notable artists ==
=== Favored Nations ===
- Eric Johnson
- Eric Sardinas
- Andy Timmons
- Steve Vai
- Johnny A.
- The Yardbirds
- Tony Macalpine
- Mattias Eklundh

=== Favored Nations Acoustic ===
- Philip Aaberg
- Peppino D'Agostino
- Pierre Bensusan
- Tommy Emmanuel
- Peter Huttlinger
- Adrian Legg

=== Favored Nations Cool ===
- Larry Coryell
- Mimi Fox
- Novecento featuring Stanley Jordan
