= Jazz Is Dead (band) =

Instrumental Grateful Dead cover band

- Genres: Rock; jazz
- Years active: 1998–2006; 2015–2016; 2023
- Members: Alphonso Johnson; Steve Kimock; Bobby Lee Rodgers; Pete Lavezzoli
- Past members: Billy Cobham; Jimmy Herring; T Lavitz; Jeff Sipe; Kenny Gradney; Dave Livolsi; Rod Morgenstein; Jeff Pevar; Chris Smith; Tom Constanten

Jazz Is Dead is an instrumental Grateful Dead cover band that interprets classic Dead songs with jazz influences. The group features veterans of jazz-fusion ensembles, as well as those of jazz ensembles. The group's composition has changed over time, and T Lavitz was the band's only constant member until they reformed in 2015 (five years after Lavitz's death).

== Personnel ==
=== Members ===
Current members

- Alphonso Johnson – bass (1998–2001, 2015–2016, 2023)
- Steve Kimock – guitar (2023)
- Bobby Lee Rodgers – guitar (2023)
- Pete Lavezzoli – drums (2023)

Former members

- Billy Cobham – drums (1998–1999)
- Jimmy Herring – lead guitar (1998–2001)
- T Lavitz – keyboards (1998–2006)
- Jeff Sipe – drums (1999–2006)
- Kenny Gradney – bass (2001–2002)
- Dave Livolsi – bass (2002–2006)
- Rod Morgenstein – drums (1999–2006, 2015–2016)
- Jeff Pevar – lead guitar (2001–2006, 2015–2016)
- Tom Constanten – keyboards (2015–2016)
- Chris Smith – keyboards (2015–2016)

=== Lineups ===
1998–1999	Billy Cobham – drums; Jimmy Herring – lead guitar; Alphonso Johnson – bass; T Lavitz – keyboards
1999–2001	Jimmy Herring – lead guitar; Alphonso Johnson – bass; T Lavitz – keyboards; Rod Morgenstein – drums; Jeff Sipe – drums
2001–2002	T Lavitz – keyboards; Rod Morgenstein – drums; Jeff Sipe – drums; Jeff Pevar – lead guitar; Kenny Gradney – bass
2002–2006	T Lavitz – keyboards; Rod Morgenstein – drums; Jeff Sipe – drums; Jeff Pevar – lead guitar; Dave Livolsi – bass
2006–2015	Band hiatus
2015–2016	Rod Morgenstein – drums; Jeff Pevar – lead guitar; Alphonso Johnson – bass; Tom Constanten – keyboards; Chris Smith – keyboards
2016–2022	Band hiatus
2023	Alphonso Johnson – bass; Steve Kimock – guitar; Bobby Lee Rodgers – guitar; Pete Lavezolli – drums

The band's original line-up consisted of:

- Guitar: Jimmy Herring (Aquarium Rescue Unit, Frogwings, Widespread Panic)
- Bass: Alphonso Johnson (Weather Report)
- Drums: Billy Cobham (Miles Davis, Mahavishnu Orchestra)
- Keyboards: T Lavitz (Dixie Dregs, Widespread Panic)

In 1999, Billy Cobham was replaced by Dixie Dregs and Winger drummer Rod Morgenstein and Phil Lesh and Friends drummer Jeff Sipe.

In 2001, guitarist Jeff Pevar (Ray Charles, Joe Cocker, Crosby Stills & Nash) replaced Jimmy Herring. Little Feat's Kenny Gradney also played bass with the group at some shows.

The group went through a few more line-up changes (mostly bassists and drummers) over the years including the addition of Dave Livolsi on bass in 2002 and the reinstated dual-drummer line-up of Sipe and Morgenstein in 2006.

In March 2006, the band set out for a month-long tour featuring the music of Blues for Allah to coincide with its 30th anniversary.

In celebration of the 50th Anniversary of The Grateful Dead, Jazz Is Dead reformed for several shows in August and September 2015. The lineup will include Alphonso Johnson on bass, Jeff Pevar on guitar, drummer Rod Morgenstein, keyboardist Chris Smith, and one-time Grateful Dead pianist Tom Constanten.

In 2015, the band released the latest album Grateful Jazz, produced and arranged by Pevar, featuring T Lavitz, Jeff Pevar, Rod Morgenstein, David Livolsi and special guests, Alphonso Johnson, Luis Conte, Bill Evans, Jerry Goodman, Bill Holloman, and Howard Levy. The album serves as a swansong to the late T Lavitz.

In 2023, the band celebrated its 25th anniversary with a lineup of Alphonso Johnson, Steve Kimock, Bobby Lee Rodgers, and Pete Lavezzoli.

== Discography ==
- Blue Light Rain (1998)
- Laughing Water (1999)
- Great Sky River (2001)
- Grateful Jazz (2015)
