= T Lavitz =

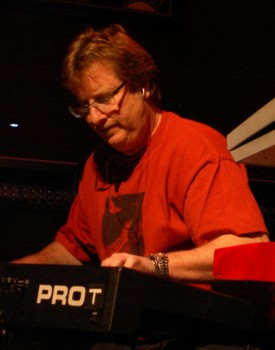

Background information
- Born: April 16, 1956; Lakewood, New Jersey, U.S.
- Died: October 7, 2010 (aged 54)
- Genres: Rock; jazz rock
- Instruments: Piano, keyboards
- Years active: 1970s–2010
- Formerly of: Dixie Dregs, Jazz Is Dead, Jefferson Starship, Widespread Panic
- Website: www.tlavitz.net

Terry "T" Lavitz (April 16, 1956 – October 7, 2010) was an American keyboardist, composer, and producer. He is best known for his work with the Dixie Dregs and Jazz Is Dead.

== Biography ==
Born on April 16, 1956, Lavitz grew up in New Jersey. He started taking piano lessons at the age of seven and was offered a scholarship at the Interlochen Arts Academy in Michigan where he studied keyboard and saxophone. After high school he attended University of Miami's School of Music. In his senior year at the UM he was asked to join the Dixie Dregs. He accepted the invitation and played his first show in January 1980. Dregs of the Earth, released in 1980, was the first Dregs album he could be heard on. In 1981 he won the 'Best New Talent' category of Keyboard Magazine's Annual Readers Poll.

The Dregs broke up in January 1983 and T Lavitz, Rod Morgenstein and Andy West went on tour with former Little Feat guitarist/singer Paul Barrere. Extended Play, a five song EP, was released in 1984. The album also featured future Dregs and Steve Morse Band bass player Dave LaRue. In 1985 Lavitz joined the Bluesbusters, a blues-rock quintet also featuring Paul Barrere, guitarist/singer Catfish Hodge, bass player Freebo (Bonnie Raitt) and drummer Larry Zack. They released two albums and toured extensively. His first solo album Storytime was released in 1986. The critically acclaimed Players album with Jeff Berlin, Steve Smith and Scott Henderson was released in 1987.

The Dregs reunited in 1988 to record two songs as a demonstration CD for the Ensoniq company. A short tour followed with Dave LaRue replacing Andy West. Later that year T Lavitz joined the reformed Mother's Finest on tour. Tours with Bill Bruford and the Billy Cobham Trio followed.

In 1991 T Lavitz was invited to join Widespread Panic after playing keyboards on their first album for the revived Capricorn Records label. Lavitz toured with Widespread Panic from April 1991 through the end of that year, but left the band as the Dixie Dregs reunited and re-signed with Capricorn Records in 1992. The re-formed Dixie Dregs shared a bill with Widespread Panic at two events in February 1992 with Lavitz performing with both bands; these were his final two appearances as the keyboardist for Widespread Panic. The Dixie Dregs recorded Bring 'Em Back Alive during a tour in February. Violinist Allen Sloan, who had become an anesthesiologist, was unable to continue touring and was replaced by former Mahavishnu Orchestra violinist Jerry Goodman. That year T Lavitz won the 'Jazz Keyboardist of the Year' category of Keyboard Magazine's Annual Readers Poll. Full Circle, the first Dregs studio album in 12 years, was released in 1994. Another solo album Gossip was recorded before T joined Jefferson Starship in 1996. Jazz Is Dead was formed at the end of 1997 with T Lavitz, Jimmy Herring, Alphonso Johnson and Billy Cobham interpreting the Grateful Dead's music in a jazzy, instrumental vein. Blue Light Rain was recorded during the first tour in 1998. Billy Cobham was replaced by Rod Morgenstein and Jeff Sipe by the time the second album Laughing Water was released.

In 2015, a Jazz Is Dead CD called Grateful Jazz was released (recorded in 2004), five years after T's passing. This CD also features his Dregs bandmate Rod Morgenstein, guitarist Jeff Pevar (who also produced the project), bassist David Livolsi and a number of special guests, including Alphonso Johnson, Bill Evans, Howard Levy, Luis Conte, Bill Holloman and Jerry Goodman.

The Dixie Dregs did a short tour in late August 1999. The band was joined by original members Andy West and Allen Sloan. Lavitz continued touring with Jazz Is Dead and also whenever possible with the Dixie Dregs.

In the first part of the new millennium T Lavitz took part in several projects. Endangered Species, with Jimmy Herring, Richie Hayward and Kenny Gradney was released in 2001, Cosmic Farm, with Rob Wasserman, Craig Erickson and Jeff Sipe, was released in 2005 and Boston T Party, with Dennis Chambers, Jeff Berlin and Dave Fiuczynski, was released in 2006. In the summer of 2006 he began teaching at the Summer Performance Program at the Berklee College of Music, Boston, MA.

Lavitz died on October 7, 2010.

== Discography ==
=== Solo ===
- 1984 Extended Play
- 1986 Storytime
- 1987 From The West
- 1989 And The Bad Habitz
- 1991 Mood Swing
- 1996 Gossip
- 2009 Electric

=== with Dixie Dregs ===
- 1980 Dregs of the Earth
- 1981 Unsung Heroes
- 1982 Industry Standard
- 1988 Off The Record
- 1989 The Best Of The Dregs – Divided We Stand
- 1992 Bring 'Em Back Alive
- 1994 Full Circle
- 1997 King Biscuit Flower Hour Presents: Dixie Dregs
- 2000 California Screamin'

=== with Jazz Is Dead ===
- 1998 Blue Light Rain
- 1999 Laughing Water
- 2001 Great Sky River
- 2015 Grateful Jazz

=== with The Bluesbusters ===
- 1986 Accept No Substitute
- 1987 This Time

=== with Jefferson Starship ===
- 1999 Windows of Heaven

=== Projects ===
- 1987 Players – Players
- 1992 The Connection – Inside Out
- 2001 Jimmy Herring, T Lavitz, Richie Hayward, Kenny Gradney – Endangered Species
- 2005 Rob Wasserman, Craig Erickson, T Lavitz, Jeff Sipe – Cosmic Farm
- 2006 Dennis Chambers, Jeff Berlin, Dave Fiuczynski, T Lavitz – Boston T Party
- 2007 T Lavitz, Dave Weckl, John Patitucci, Frank Gambale, Steve Morse, Jerry Goodman – School of the Arts

=== other appearances ===
- 1979 University of Miami Concert Jazz Band – Halcyon Days
- 1980 Darryl Rhoades and the HaHaVishnu Orchestra – Burgers From Heaven
- 1981 Projections – Projections
- 1983 Art in America – Art In America
- 1983 Paul Barrere – On My Own Two Feet
- 1984 John Macey – Meltdown
- 1984 Steve Morse Band – The Introduction
- 1984 Paul Barrere – Real Lies
- 1984 Stretch – Stretch
- 1985 Steve Morse Band – Stand Up
- 1985 Nils Lofgren – Flip
- 1985 Jeff Berlin & Vox Humana – Champion
- 1985 Electric Tigers – Electric Tigers
- 1987 Mark O'Connor – Stone From Which The Arch Was Made
- 1987 Col. Bruce Hampton – Arkansas
- 1987 Electric Tigers – Here To Stay
- 1988 Widespread Panic – Space Wrangler
- 1989 Steve Morse – High Tension Wires
- 1990 Lonesome Val – Lonesome Val
- 1991 David Becker Tribune – In Motion
- 1991 Widespread Panic – Widespread Panic
- 1992 Various Artists – Legacy II: A Collection Of Singer Songwriters
- 1992 Kiko – Kiko
- 1992 Dave LaRue – Hub City Kid
- 1992 Bob Mansueto – Like A Stranger
- 1993 Glenn Alexander – Rainbow's Revenge
- 1994 Steve Bailey – Evolution
- 1994 Jeff Richman – The Blue Heart
- 1995 Catfish Hodge – Like A Big Dog Barkin'
- 1995 Greg Koch And The Tone Controls – Strat's Got Your Tongue
- 1995 Gary Tanin – Sublime Nation
- 1996 Kacee Clanton – Seeing Red
- 1997 Pat Benatar – Innamorata
- 1998 Peter Himmelman – Love Thinketh No Evil
- 1998 [Soundtrack] – The Souler Opposite
- 1998 Robbie Krieger – Cinematix
- 1998 Jeff Richman – Sand Dance
- 2000 Soulfarm – Live At Wetlands
- 2000 Jim Stubblefield – Cities Of Gold
- 2000 Inasense – Get Your Shinebox
- 2001 C Lanzbom – From This Day On
- 2002 Andy West With Rama – Rama 1
- 2002 Candlewyck – Play
- 2002 Candlewyck – Once Up
- 2003 Bluestrain – Dancing With My Baby
- 2003 Widespread Panic – Panic In The Streets
- 2003 Peter Himmelman – My Best Friend Is A Salamander
- 2003 Roy Vogt – Simplicity
- 2003 Zyg – To The Rescue
- 2005 Steve Yanek – Across The Landscape
- 2007 Woody Moran – Tu-Toned Stranger
- 2008 Teresa Storch – Stream Of Concrete
- 2009 Laura Siersema – Talon of The Blackwater
- 2010 Julien Kasper Band – Trance Groove
