= Grateful Jazz =

Studio album by Jazz Is Dead
- Released: 2015
- Recorded: 2004
- Studio: Tapeworks, Inc., Hartford, Connecticut; Pet Peev Studios, Talent, Oregon
- Genre: Psychedelic music, jam rock, jazz fusion
- Length: 1:05:23
- Label: Pet Peev Music; CD20151
- Producer: Jeff Pevar

Jazz Is Dead chronology
Great Sky River (2001)	Grateful Jazz (2015)

Grateful Jazz is the fourth album by the instrumental Grateful Dead cover band Jazz Is Dead. The original tracks were recorded in 2004 in Hartford, Connecticut, and were then set aside. In anticipation of the fiftieth anniversary of the Grateful Dead, guitarist Jeff Pevar dug up the recordings, added overdubs by a number of guest musicians, and released them on CD in 2015 via his Pet Peev Music. The album features Pevar along with keyboard player T. Lavitz, bassist David Livolsi, and drummer Rod Morgenstein, and is dedicated to the memory of T. Lavitz.

== Reception ==
In a review for Relix, Jeff Tamarkin called the album "JID's magnum opus," and wrote: "'Dark Star,' saved for last, is unlike any the Dead ever played: equally experimental and sonically adventurous, but owing as much to classic '70s fusion as to anything that ever came out of Kesey's place. Inspired stuff, this."

Writing for The Working Musician, Roger Zee commented: "The band reanimates The Dead with a broad palette of colors and styles... The pedigrees of the players shine through... These superlative musicians put new skin on the bones of The Dead and elevate it to a 'Higher Love!'"

Bob Girouard, writing for Modern Drummer, praised Morgenstein's playing on the album, calling it a "showcase for [his] versatility," and stating that it finds him "alternately playing with sensitivity and ferocity, maximizing his capabilities rhythmically and melodically, and always walking the delicate line of respecting tradition and exploring boldly."

== Track listing ==
1. "Cumberland Blues" (Jerry Garcia, Robert Hunter, Phil Lesh) – 3:38
2. "Sugar Magnolia" (Robert Hunter, Bob Weir) – 5:56
3. "Jack Straw" (Robert Hunter, Bob Weir) – 9:12
4. "Truckin'" (Robert Hunter, Jerry Garcia, Phil Lesh, Bob Weir) – 8:13
5. "Attics of my Life" (Robert Hunter, Jerry Garcia) – 9:21
6. "Friend of the Devil" (Robert Hunter, Jerry Garcia, John Dawson) – 2:26
7. "Uncle John's Band" (Robert Hunter, Jerry Garcia) – 7:02
8. "Mr. Charlie/One More Saturday Night" (Robert Hunter, Ron "Pigpen" McKernan/Bob Weir) – 5:55
9. "Dark Star" (Robert Hunter, Jerry Garcia) – 13:24

== Personnel ==
- Jeff Pevar – electric guitar, acoustic guitar, lap steel guitar, mandolin, dobro, banjo
- T. Lavitz – piano, organ, synthesizer
- David Livolsi – bass
- Rod Morgenstein – drums, washboard

== Special guests ==
- Alphonso Johnson – 5 string double bass
- Luis Conte – percussion
- Bill Evans – soprano saxophone
- Jerry Goodman – violin, electric violin
- Bill Holloman – trumpet, saxophone
- Howard Levy – harmonica
