= Pete Huttlinger =

American musician (1961–2016)

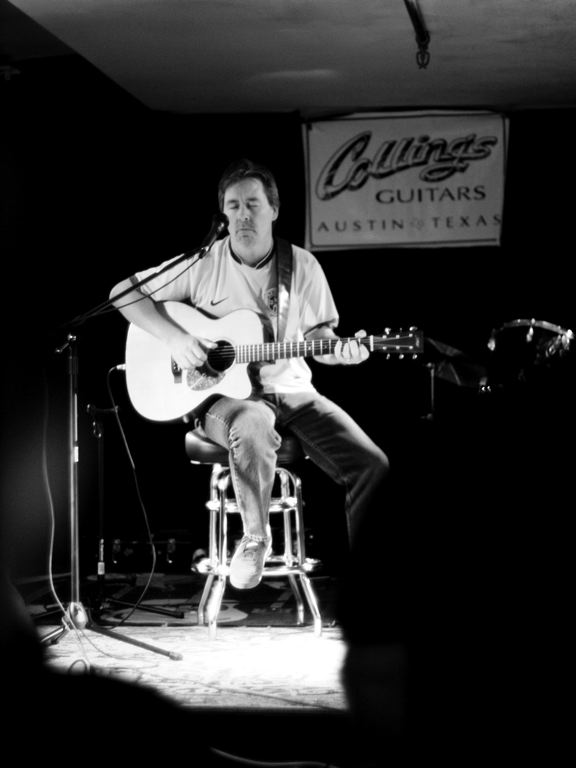
Pete Huttlinger (2007).

Peter John Huttlinger (June 22, 1961 – January 15, 2016) was an American guitarist. A graduate of Berklee College of Music, Huttlinger was a Nashville studio artist. In 2000, he won the National Fingerstyle Guitar Championship at the Walnut Valley Festival in Winfield, Kansas. He performed around the world with such artists as John Denver, LeAnn Rimes and many others. As a solo artist, he performed across the U.S. and Europe.

== Biography ==
Born in Washington, D.C., Huttlinger descended from two lines of prominent journalists. His grandfather on his mother’s side, Fred Walker, was an editor of the San Francisco Call-Bulletin, reporting directly to its owner and publisher, William Randolph Hearst. Huttlinger’s father, Joseph, was a White House correspondent and a publisher of his own newsletter on the oil industry. "My dad took my mom to the White House on their first date," Huttlinger says, "and while they were walking around, President Truman came out and said, ‘Hi, Joe.’ That got Mom’s attention.”

By the age of 12, Huttlinger had begun music lessons and by 14 he had settled on the guitar. Soon after he graduated from high school, a relative left him a small inheritance. He decided to use this windfall to study at Berklee College of Music.

During the early 1990s, guitarist John Denver’s tour manager and producer Kris O’Connor heard Huttlinger on another project and recommended him to join Denver's band. Huttlinger toured, recorded and performed on television with Denver from 1994 until the singer’s death in 1997.

Huttlinger had performed on numerous Grammy-winning and Grammy-nominated projects. He had also been nominated for an Emmy for music he both composed and performed for a PBS special. His performances had been used in several national TV series, including the PBS Nature special "Let This Be A Voice." He created the theme song for ESPN’s Flyfishing America, a program on which he had made guest appearances.

As a recording artist Huttlinger released numerous albums and received wide-acceptance ranging from his critically acclaimed Naked Pop to Things Are Looking Up. In 2009 (on Instar Records) Huttlinger released Fingerpicking Wonder: The Music of Stevie Wonder. His most current release (2013) "McGuire's Landing" was a CD plus a short story that was written by Huttlinger.

In 2007, Huttlinger made his debut at New York City’s Carnegie Hall. He was invited back in 2008 and made his first appearance there as a solo artist. He performed again at Carnegie Hall on January 9, 2010.

In 2004, 2007 and 2010, he was invited to participate in both of Eric Clapton’s Crossroads Festivals. Huttlinger also made appearances as a side-man. He toured with John Denver for many years and appears with Country/Pop superstar LeAnn Rimes, including the BBC Television’s “Live From Abbey Road,” a series taped at the famous London studios, and ABC’s “Dancing With The Stars.”

In November 2010, Huttlinger suffered a stroke, paralyzing his right side and causing him to lose the ability to speak. Despite his recovery, Huttlinger eventually suffered end-stage heart failure, the result of congenital cardiac abnormalities. He was airlifted to the Texas Heart Institute in Houston, where he was outfitted with a VAD (Ventricular Assist Device) heart pump and spent the next four months in the hospital recovering. He took what he learned from surviving both a major stroke and end-stage heart failure and turned it into "Don't Just Live, Live Well," a presentation on how he overcame what seemed to be insurmountable obstacles. "Don't Just Live, Live Well" was embraced by audiences.

In 2013 he released the long-awaited McGuire's Landing Project during a house concert on his birthday in Baltimore, Maryland. He was a regularly featured performer with the Nashville Chamber Orchestra and had appeared with a number of other symphonies.

He toured with John Denver for the last four years of Denver's life and often toured with pop icon John Oates of Hall & Oates.

Huttlinger suffered a second stroke on January 11, 2016, and died four days later at the Vanderbilt University Medical Center at the age of 54. He resided in Nashville, Tennessee. He was married to Erin Morris-Huttlinger.

== Discography ==
- Catch & Release (Instar Records, 1994)
- Naked Pop (Favored Nations, 2002)
- The Need (Instar Records, 2002)
- Hymns for Guitar (Instar Records, 2005)
- Two Friends Two Guitars - Some John Denver Favorites (Instar Records, 2005)
- The Santa Rita Connection (Instar Records, 2006)
- Catch and Release (Instar Records, 2006)
- Hymns for Guitar II (Instar Records, 2007)
- Things Are Looking Up (Instar Records, 2007)
- First Light - A Pete Huttlinger Christmas (Instar Records, 2007)
- Fingerpicking Wonder: The Music of Stevie Wonder (Instar Records, 2009)
- Celtic Harmony (Green Hill/Universal, 2011)
- The Black Swan (Instar Records, 2011)
- McGuire's Landing (Instar Records, 2013)
- Parnassus (Instar Records, 2015)
- Christmas Time (Instar Records, 2015)

== Books ==
- The Peter Huttlinger Collection Songbook Volume 1 (2004, Instar, ISBN 978-7-7700-3938-6)
- Hymns for Guitar Songbook (2005, Instar, ISBN 978-7-7700-4702-2)
- First Light - A Pete Huttlinger Christmas Songbook (2008, Instar, ISBN 978-7-7745-5967-5)
- The Peter Huttlinger Collection Songbook Volume 2
- Hymns for Guitar II Songbook
- Catch & Release Songbook
- The Santa Rita Connection Songbook
- Thinks Are Looking Up Songbook
- The Black Swan Songbook
- McGuire's Landing Songbook (2013)
- Joined at the Heart (2015)

== Instructional videos ==
- Learn To Play the Songs of John Denver, One (2001, Homespun)
- Learn To Play the Songs of John Denver, Two (2002, Homespun)
- Arrangements For Solo Acoustic Guitar (2003, Homespun)
- A Guitarist's Guide To Better Practicing (2003, Homespun)
- Learn To Play the Songs of John Denver, Volume 3 (2004, Homespun)
- Essential Exercises for Fingerstyle Guitar (2004, Homespun)
- Arrangements For Solo Acoustic Guitar No. 2 (2006, Homespun)
- Learn to Play the Songs of Jim Croce, One (2006, Homespun)
- Pete Huttlinger's Wonderful World of Chords (2008, Homespun)
- Pete Huttlinger Teaches The Songs Of Gordon Lightfoot (2008, Homespun)
- Learn to Play the Songs of Jim Croce, Two (2009, Homespun)
- Hymns For Guitar - Inspirational Arrangements For Fingerstyle Players (2009, Homespun)
- Learn to Play the Songs of Dan Fogelberg, One (2010, Homespun)
- Learn to Play the Songs of Dan Fogelberg, Two (Homespun)
- The Lone Arranger (2010, Truefire)
- Learn To Play the Songs of John Denver, Four (2014, Homespun)
- 50 Fingerpicking Licks You MUST Know (2014, Truefire)
