= Thunder from Down Under =

- Japanese and American edition

Studio album by Frank Gambale
- Released: 1990
- Recorded: November 1989
- Studio: Studio Sound in North Hollywood, Los Angeles; Silverlake Sound Studios, Mad Hatter Studios in Los Angeles
- Genre: Jazz fusion, smooth jazz, instrumental rock
- Length: 58:17
- Label: Victor
- Producer: Frank Gambale, Akira Taguchi, Takashi Misu, Ron Moss

Frank Gambale chronology
Live! (1989)	Thunder from Down Under (1990)	Note Worker (1991)

Alternative cover
- European edition

Thunder from Down Under is the third studio album by guitarist Frank Gambale, released in 1990 through Victor Entertainment and reissued on 24 April 2001 through Samson Records.

== Critical reception ==
Professional ratings
Review scores
Source	Rating
AllMusic	3/5 stars

Alex Henderson at AllMusic gave Thunder from Down Under three stars out of five, listing "Samba di Somewhere", "Humid Beings" and "Mambojambo" as highlights.

== Track listing ==
All tracks are written by Frank Gambale, except where noted

No.	Title	Length
1.	"Humid Being (Note: "Humid Beings" on the European edition.)"	5:19
2.	"Faster Than an Arrow" (lyrics: Gambale, Stephanie Bennett)	4:37
3.	"Samba di Somewhere"	5:57
4.	"Kuranda"	4:56
5.	"Obsessed for Life" (lyrics: Gambale, Stephanie Bennett)	4:13
6.	"Leave Ozone Alone"	5:59
7.	"The Land of Wonder"	5:04
8.	"Obrigado Fukuoka"	5:00
9.	"Robo-Roo"	5:40
10.	"Forgotten but Not Gone"	5:15
11.	"Mambojambo (Note: "Mamojambo" on the European edition.)"	4:50
12.	"One Not Two" (lyrics: Gambale, Stephanie Bennett)	1:27
Total length:		58:17

== Personnel ==
- Frank Gambale – vocals, guitar, keyboard (tracks 1, 4–7, 9–11), synthesizer (track 12), piano, electric percussion (track 7), mixing, production
- Freddie Ravel – keyboard (tracks 1, 8)
- Kei Akagi – synthesizer (track 1)
- Chick Corea – Rhodes piano
- Gregg Bissonette – drums (tracks 1, 2)
- Joe Heredia – drums (tracks 3, 8, 9, 11)
- Tom Brechtlein – drums (tracks 4, 10)
- Vinnie Colaiuta – drums (tracks 5, 6)
- Luis Conte – percussion (tracks 1, 3, 4, 6, 11)
- Steve Kershisnik – bass (tracks 1, 2, 4, 9–11)
- Tim Landers – bass (tracks 3, 6, 8)
- Abraham Laboriel – bass (tracks 5, 7)
- Steve Tavaglione – saxophone, EWI
- Gary Grant – flugelhorn
- Robert M. Biles – engineering, mixing
- Wally Traugott – mastering
- Akira Taguchi – executive production
- Takashi Misu – executive production
- Ron Moss – executive production
