= Brave New Guitar =

Studio album by Frank Gambale
- Released: 1985
- Studio: Weddington Studios, North Hollywood
- Genre: Jazz fusion
- Length: 38:42
- Label: Legato
- Producer: Frank Gambale, Mark Varney

Frank Gambale chronology
| Brave New Guitar (1985) | A Present for the Future (1987) |

Professional ratings
Review scores
| Source | Rating |
|---|---|
| AllMusic | 3/5 stars |

Brave New Guitar is the first studio album by jazz guitarist Frank Gambale, released in 1985 through Legato Records.

== Track listing ==
All tracks are written by Frank Gambale

| No. | Title | Length |
|---|---|---|
| 1. | "Fe Fi Fo Funk" | 4:03 |
| 2. | "Blues for Hollywood" | 5:39 |
| 3. | "Credit Reference Blues" | 5:01 |
| 4. | "Song for Family" | 5:10 |
| 5. | "Spending Sunday with You" | 5:19 |
| 6. | "Weddington Street" | 5:50 |
| 7. | "Alone Together" | 3:07 |
| 8. | "A Touch of Brazil" | 5:24 |
| Total length: | | 38:42 |

== Personnel ==
Credits adapted from CD edition liner notes:

- Frank Gambale – guitar, vocals, producer
- Jon Crosse – saxophone, flute
- Mark Gasbarro – keyboard
- Kei Akagi – piano
- Jack Kelly – drums
- Steve Kershisnik – bass
- Marcus Hinder – timbales, congas
- Steve Reid – percussion
- Wally Grant – engineering
- Steve Hall – engineering
- Mark Varney – executive producer
