= Live! (Frank Gambale album) =

Live album by Frank Gambale
- Released: 1989
- Recorded: August 21, 1988
- Venue: The Baked Potato in Studio City, Los Angeles
- Genre: Jazz fusion
- Length: 64:44
- Label: Legato
- Producer: Frank Gambale, Mark Varney

Frank Gambale chronology
A Present for the Future (1987)	Live! (1989)	Thunder from Down Under (1990)

Professional ratings
Review scores
Source	Rating
AllMusic	4.5/5 stars

Live! is the first live album by guitarist Frank Gambale, released in 1989 by Legato Records and reissued in 2000 by Wombat Records.

== Track listing ==
All music is composed by Frank Gambale.

No.	Title	Length
1.	"Credit Reference Blues"	13:13
2.	"Fe Fi Fo Funk"	9:58
3.	"Spending Sunday with You"	8:56
4.	"A Touch of Brasil"	16:12
5.	"Spike's Song"	6:23
6.	"The Natives Are Restless"	10:02
Total length:		64:44

== Personnel ==
- Frank Gambale – guitar, mixing, producer
- Kei Akagi – keyboard
- Joey Heredia – drums
- Steve Kershisnik – bass
- Steve Tavaglione – saxophone, EWI

Technical

- John Falzarano – engineering
- Ray Thompson – engineering
- Robert M. Biles – mixing
- Jeff Sanders – mastering
- Mark Varney – executive producer
