= Under One Roof (album) =

Live album by Hunters & Collectors
- Released: 11 November 1998
- Recorded: 13 March 1998; Selina's Entertainment Centre, Coogee Bay Hotel, Sydney
- Genre: Australian rock
- Length: 78:32
- Label: White/Mushroom
- Producers: Hunters & Collectors

Hunters & Collectors chronology
Juggernaut (1998)	Under One Roof (1998)	Natural Selection (2003)

Under One Roof is the third live album by Australian rock group Hunters & Collectors, released on 11 November 1998. It was recorded on 13 March 1998 at one of the band's last performances of their Juggernaut Say Goodbye Tour at the Coogee Bay Hotel in Sydney. The group also issued a video album of the same name on VHS in 1998, which was directed by Victoria Garrett and Charlie Singer.

A DVD of this performance was subsequently released on 24 November 2003 with a surround sound audio mix. To coincide with the DVD release the CD was re-issued on 1 December 2003. The DVD reached No. 31 on the ARIA DVD Charts and was subsequently certified Gold. On 3 June 2011 the album was reissued with a different title, Hunters & Collectors – Greatest Hits Live, and different artwork. A combined CD and DVD package, under the original title was released on 5 April 2013.

== Background ==
Australian rock band, Hunters & Collectors, issued Under One Roof on 11 November 1998, after they had disbanded earlier that year. The line-up of the group was John Archer on bass guitar and backing vocals; Doug Falconer on drums, percussion, programming and backing vocals; Jack Howard on trumpet, keyboards and backing vocals; Barry Palmer on lead guitar; Mark Seymour on lead vocals; Jeremy Smith on guitars, French horn, keyboards, programming and backing vocals; and Michael Waters on trombone. In January the group had released Juggernaut, their ninth studio album, which was co-produced with Kalju Tonuma (The Mavis's, Boom Crash Opera) and Mark Opitz (Hoodoo Gurus, Jimmy Barnes, INXS) and the band.

With its release, Hunters & Collectors announced that they would disband after the Juggernaut Say Goodbye tour. On 13 March 1998 at one of the band's last performances, at the Coogee Bay Hotel in Sydney, they recorded Under One Roof. Their last public show was on 22 March 1998 in Melbourne before disbanding. The group also issued a video album of the same name on VHS in 1998, which was directed by Victoria Garrett and Charlie Singer.

Professional ratings
Review scores
Source	Rating
Allmusic	3.5/5 stars

In March 2009 Seymour told Patrick Donovan of The Age "It was a pretty serious decision to retire, and all the guys in the band are heavyweight professionals in their respective areas of employment. Obviously we have to put ourselves first. There's just no momentum in the idea (of reforming)".

== Track listing ==
1. "Where Do You Go?" – 4:47
2. "Turn a Blind Eye" – 4:44
3. "Head Above Water" – 3:52
4. "What's a Few Men" – 3:50
5. "Talking to a Stranger" – 4:52
6. "42 Wheels" – 3:49
7. "Back in the Hole" – 4:21
8. "True Tears of Joy" – 4:30
9. "When the River Runs Dry" – 5:59
10. "True Believers" – 4:19
11. "Say Goodbye" – 5:10
12. "Holy Grail" – 3:52
13. "The Slab" – 5:18
14. "Throw Your Arms Around Me" – 5:16
15. "Inside a Fireball" – 5:21
16. "Stuck on You" – 3:34
17. "Do You See What I See?" – 4:58

== Personnel ==
Credited to:

Hunters & Collectors members

- John Archer – bass guitar, backing vocals
- Doug Falconer – drums, backing vocals
- Jack Howard – trumpet, keyboards, backing vocals
- Robert Miles – live sound, production manager
- Barry Palmer – guitar
- Mark Seymour – Lead vocals, guitar
- Jeremy Smith – guitar, French horn, keyboards, backing vocals
- Michael Waters – trombone, keyboards

Production details

- Recording engineer – Tim Whitten
  - Assistant recording engineer – Trevor King
- Mixed – Chris Dickie at Sing Sing Studio's, Melbourne
- Producer – Hunters & Collectors
- Mastered – Don Bartley, Studios 301, Sydney
- Art and design – Robert Miles
- Layout – Sonia Cox
- Photography – Isamu Sawa
- Director – Victoria Garrett, Charlie Singer (for VHS or DVD)
