= Cornel School of Contemporary Music =

Division of Shepherd University (1999–2017)

Coordinates: 34.116693°N 118.248491°W

- Type: Private
- Active: 1999–December 2017
- Accreditation: ACICS
- Affiliations: Shepherd University
- President: Richard Cornel Rhee
- Academic staff: 20
- Location: 3200 North San Fernando Road, Los Angeles, California, United States
- Campus: Urban
- Website: cornelschoolofmusic.com

The Cornel School of Contemporary Music (CSCM) was a private nonprofit school of contemporary music at Shepherd University located in Los Angeles, California. It was accredited by the Accrediting Council for Independent Colleges and Schools. The school awarded music certificates, Bachelor of Music, and Master of Music degrees. Shepherd University LA filed for bankruptcy and closed, along with the CSCM, in 2017.

== History ==
The Cornel School of Contemporary Music (CSCM) was a private nonprift school of contemporary music at Shepherd University located in Los Angeles, California. It was established in 1999 with the opening of Shepherd University a nonprofit Christian college.

CSCM's dean was Daniel Walker and its academic director was Carlos Campos.

The Shepherd University filed for bankruptcy in August 2017. It permanently closed in December 2017, along with the Cornel School of Contemporary Music.

== Campus ==
CSCM was located in Shephard University's 80,000 square foot buildint at 3200 North San Fernando Road in Los Angeles, California. It was located centrally in Los Angeles, new film and television studios and the headquarters of recording industry.

== Academics ==
CSCM offered music certificates, Bachelor of Music, and Master of Music degree in contemporary composition, film scoring, songwriting, music production, performance (piano, keyboard, bass, drum, guitar, vocal, and woodwind), and contemporary Christian music and worship music.

In 2014, CSCM had 20 faculty members.

== Accreditation ==
The Cornel School of Contemporary Music (CSCM) was accredited by the Accrediting Council for Independent Colleges and Schools (ACICS), as part of Shephard University LA, on December 27, 2013. The university was approved for Western Association of Schools and Colleges candidacy in November 2013.

== Notable faculty ==
- Sara Gazarek (voice, group performance)
- Oscar Hernandez (piano, group performance)
- Allen Hinds (guitar)
- Abraham Laboriel (bass, guitar)
- Otmaro Ruíz (keyboard)
- Tommy Walker (contemporary Christian music, worship music, and group performance)
