= If I Could (album) =

Studio album by Stanley Turrentine
- Released: 1993
- Recorded: March 13 – May 12, 1993
- Studio: National Recording Studio and Sound On Sound Recording Studios, New York City, NY
- Genre: Jazz
- Length: 53:45
- Label: MusicMasters; 65103-2
- Producer: Don Sebesky

Stanley Turrentine chronology
More Than a Mood (1992)	If I Could (1993)	T Time (1995)

If I Could is an album by saxophonist Stanley Turrentine, released in 1993 on MusicMasters Records. This album peaked at No. 10 on the US Billboard Top Jazz Albums chart.

== Reception ==
Professional ratings
Review scores
Source	Rating
AllMusic	4/5 stars

AllMusic reviewer Scott Yanow stated "This session from tenor-saxophonist Stanley Turrentine often sounds like a CTI recording from the 1970s ... Turrentine's solos are stronger than the melodies and he generally overcomes the unimaginative use of strings on the ballads. Mr. T. is in fine form and he makes the most of each selection ... Recommended".

== Track listing ==
1. "June Bug" (Tommy Turrentine) – 7:46
2. "Caravan" (Juan Tizol, Duke Ellington, Irving Mills) – 15:20
3. "I Remember Bill" (Don Sebesky) – 6:09
4. "The Avenue" (Charles Fambrough) – 3:52
5. "Marvin's Song" (Tommy Turrentine) – 6:03
6. "Maybe September" (Ray Evans, Percy Faith, Jay Livingston) – 3:30
7. "A Luta Continua" (Vincent Evans) – 6:20
8. "If I Could" (Pat Metheny) – 4:45

== Personnel ==
- Stanley Turrentine – tenor saxophone
- Hubert Laws – flute, piccolo
- Sir Roland Hanna – piano
- Ron Carter – bass
- Grady Tate – drums
- Gloria Agostini – harp
- Steve Kroon – percussion
- Matthew Raimondi - concertmaster
- Don Sebesky – arranger
- Vincent Leroy Evans - kalimba (track 7)
