= Joel Taylor (musician) =

American drummer (born 1959)

- Born: 1959 (age 66–67); Worland, Wyoming
- Origin: United States
- Occupation: Drummer
- Website: www.joel-taylor.com

Joel Taylor (born 1959) is an American drummer who has toured or recorded with artists such as Michael Buble, Rick Springfield, Victor Wooten, Bobby Caldwell, Greg Howe, Brian Bromberg, Emiel van Egdom, Mike Garson, Al Di Meola, Frank Gambale, Allan Holdsworth, Banned From Utopia, and appears on Yanni's live concert video Tribute.
