= Endangered Species (Endangered Species album) =

Studio album by Jimmy Herring, T. Lavitz, Richie Hayward, Kenny Gradney
- Released: 2001
- Genres: jam rock, jazz fusion
- Labels: Tone Center Records; TC-40202
- Producers: Ricky Keller, T. Lavitz

Endangered Species is the debut album by the band of the same name. The group's sole release, it was issued in 2001 by Tone Center Records. The album features guitarist Jimmy Herring, keyboardist T. Lavitz, drummer Richie Hayward, and bassist Kenny Gradney.

Hayward noted that the group was a side project for all the musicians involved, and commented: "We didn't have any commercial intentions for this band... We just wanted to get together and make some music we liked; it was just about playing."

== Reception ==
Professional ratings
Review scores
Source	Rating
AllMusic	4/5 stars

In a review for AllMusic, Glenn Astarita wrote: "the quartet goes straight for the jugular via a no-nonsense approach; however, the artists pay strict attention to compositional form. Heated soloing abounds... the quartet sustains quite a bit of interest throughout, largely due to Herring and Lavitz's superb soloing and the rhythm sections' pulsating attack. Highly recommended."

Todd S. Jenkins, writing for All About Jazz, called the album "an edgy, exciting session that stands with the best of Tone Center's releases so far," and stated: "Endangered Species is a fascinating listen from beginning to end, with all the suspense one expects from a good jam band but none of the ennui that comes from overbearing chops. A true bulls-eye."

Michael Lello of Jambands.com commented: "if you want to hear one of rock's best yet mostly unheralded guitarists, a versatile keyboardist... and a tight, expressive rhythm section, this disc is for you. No flashy soloing, no histrionics. Just a solid instrumental rock record. And that, in and of itself, should be enough to make this album worth your while."

Modern Drummer's Mike Haid remarked: "A perfect counterpoint to the heavy rock fusion chops of the rest of this band, Hayward plays with a loose, dirty style with little polish but lots of grit... This is a real treat for southern-fried fusion fans."

== Track listing ==
1. "Headstrong" (Jimmy Herring) – 5:31
2. "The New Berkley Park" (T. Lavitz) – 4:03
3. "Slowlo" (T. Lavitz) – 5:35
4. "Pickled Hearing" (Jimmy Herring, T. Lavitz) – 5:00
5. "Lockwood Folley" (Jimmy Herring) – 8:08
6. "Justice" (T. Lavitz) – 5:36
7. "Cats Out da Bag" (Kenny Gradney, T. Lavitz) – 5:49
8. "Camel Lope" (T. Lavitz) – 5:01
9. "The Gospel Truth" (Ricky Keller, T. Lavitz) – 5:18

== Personnel ==
- Jimmy Herring – guitar
- T. Lavitz – keyboards
- Kenny Gradney – bass
- Richie Hayward – drums
