= Gary Lefebvre =

- Born: February 18, 1939; Columbus, Ohio, U.S.
- Died: August 7, 2013 (aged 74) Linda Vista, California, U.S.
- Genres: Jazz; Pop
- Occupation: Musician
- Instruments: Saxophone (tenor, soprano, alto), flute
- Years active: 1956–2012

Gary Lefebvre (February 18, 1939 – August 7, 2013) was an American jazz saxophone player known for his contributions to the West Coast style of the genre. While primarily a tenor saxophone player, he also performed on soprano and alto saxophones as well as on flute.

== Biography ==
Lefebvre was born in Columbus, Ohio in 1939. Going to high school in San Diego with a young Frank Zappa, he joined the San Diego Symphony in 1956. He played in bands with Ella Fitzgerald, Terry Gibbs, Judy Garland, Stan Kenton, Louis Bellson, Chet Baker, Tony Bennett, The Supremes, and Shorty Rogers. Some of his recordings with Rogers were captured on TV.

He was co-leader of a quintet with Joe Marillo, a fellow saxophone player, in his later years. Lefebvre recorded two albums of his own prior to his death from a stroke in 2013.

== Legacy ==
Jazz critic Marc Myers noted that he left "behind a king-size reputation among musicians but only two leadership albums and just a handful of others."
