= Natural Selection (Hunters & Collectors album) =

Compilation album by Hunters & Collectors
- Released: 13 October 2003
- Recorded: 1982–1998
- Genre: Rock, pub rock, Australian rock
- Length: 1:06:30
- Label: Liberation Music
- Producer: Hunters & Collectors

Hunters & Collectors chronology
Under One Roof (1998)	Natural Selection (2003)	Mutations (2005)

Professional ratings
Review scores
Source	Rating
Allmusic	4.5/5 stars

Natural Selection is the third compilation album by Australian rock band Hunters & Collectors, released in 2003. The songs are from the band's seven studio albums. The album peaked at Number 40 on the ARIA Charts. It was released in a CD, DVD and limited edition 2× CD formats. It was subsequently reissued as a separate CD on 19 April 2004 and as a separate DVD on 24 November 2003. On 21 October 2011 the 2004 Natural Selection CD and the 2003 Natural Selection DVD were reissued in a two disc pack titled Greatest Hits.

== Track listing ==
No.	Title	Writer(s)	Originally from	Length
1.	"Talking to a Stranger"	Mark Seymour, John Archer, Geoff Crosby, Doug Falconer, Robert Miles, Greg Perano, Ray Tosti-Guerra	Hunters & Collectors	7:30
2.	"Carry Me"	Mark Seymour, John Archer, Geoff Crosby, Doug Falconer, Robert Miles, Michael Waters	The Jaws of Life	4:11
3.	"The Slab"	Mark Seymour, John Archer, Geoff Crosby, Doug Falconer, Robert Miles, Michael Waters, Greg Perano	The Jaws of Life	3:56
4.	"Say Goodbye"	Mark Seymour, John Archer, Doug Falconer, Robert Miles, Jeremy Smith, Michael Waters, John Howard	Human Frailty	3:50
5.	"Everythings On Fire"	Mark Seymour, John Archer, Doug Falconer, Robert Miles, Jeremy Smith, Michael Waters, John Howard	Human Frailty	4:25
6.	"Is There Anybody In There?"	Mark Seymour, John Archer, Doug Falconer, Robert Miles, Jeremy Smith, Michael Waters, John Howard	Human Frailty	3:24
7.	"Back On The Breadline"	Mark Seymour, John Archer, Doug Falconer, Robert Miles, Jeremy Smith, Michael Waters, John Howard	What's a Few Men?	4:01
8.	"Do You See What I See?"	Mark Seymour, John Archer, Doug Falconer, Robert Miles, Jeremy Smith, Michael Waters, John Howard, Barry Palmer	What's a Few Men?	3:36
9.	"When The River Runs Dry"	Mark Seymour, John Archer, Doug Falconer, Robert Miles, Jeremy Smith, Michael Waters, John Howard, Barry Palmer	Ghost Nation	5:01
10.	"Blind Eye"	Mark Seymour, John Archer, Doug Falconer, Robert Miles, Jeremy Smith, Michael Waters, John Howard, Barry Palmer	Ghost Nation	4:28
11.	"True Tears Of Joy"	Mark Seymour, John Archer, Doug Falconer, Robert Miles, Michael Waters, John Howard, Barry Palmer	Cut	4:32
12.	"Where Do You Go?"	Mark Seymour, John Archer, Doug Falconer, Robert Miles, Michael Waters, John Howard, Barry Palmer	Cut	3:58
13.	"Back In The Hole"	Mark Seymour, John Archer, Doug Falconer, Robert Miles, Michael Waters, John Howard, Barry Palmer	Demon Flower	4:27
14.	"Holy Grail"	Mark Seymour, John Archer, Doug Falconer, Robert Miles, Jeremy Smith, Michael Waters, John Howard, Barry Palmer	Cut	3:49
15.	"Throw Your Arms Around Me"	Mark Seymour, John Archer, Doug Falconer, Robert Miles, Michael Waters, John Howard, Geoffrey Crosby	Under One Roof	5:16
Total length:				1:06:30

== Charts ==
Chart (2003)	Peak position
Australian Albums (ARIA)	40
