= Tommy Walker (worship leader) =

American songwriter

Tommy Walker is an American worship leader, composer of contemporary worship music, recording artist and author. Since 1990, he has been the worship leader at Christian Assembly, a Foursquare Church congregation in Los Angeles. Some of Walker's most well-known songs are "Only A God Like You," "No Greater Love," "Mourning Into Dancing," "He Knows My Name" and "That's Why We Praise Him."

In addition to his responsibilities as a church leader, he has taken his CA Worship Band on numerous overseas trips, including several trips to Southeast Asia and the Philippines. He has worked alongside Franklin Graham, Greg Laurie, Jack Hayford, Bill Hybels, Rick Warren and at Promise Keepers events.

== Career ==
In 2000, Walker released his album Never Gonna Stop, which earned a larger reception than his previous albums, peaking at number one hundred and fifty three on the Billboard Top 200 chart. In 2004, Walker released his album, Make it Glorious, which was recorded live at Regent University with a 50-member choir. A choral collection of some of Walker's best-known songs entitled That's Why We Praise Him: Celebrating the Songs of Tommy Walker (arranged and orchestrated by Bradley Knight) was also released in 2004. This was followed by a second choral collection of songs by Walker, Great and Marvelous: Celebrating the Songs of Tommy Walker Volume 2, in 2005, which earned Walker a Dove Award nomination. On March 18, 2008, following eight live recordings and many years as a worship leader, Tommy Walker released his first studio recording, I Have A Hope. The album was produced by producer Ed Cash and labeled by Maranatha! Music. In support of his national studio debut, Walker made appearances at the National Christian Musicians Summit, Liberty University and the National Worship Leadership Conference, run by Worship Leader Magazine. In an interview, Walker said that he had been offered deals by record labels and publishers when his songs were first being recorded, but he had declined the offers because he had grown up with a negative perception on the music industry. In 2012, Shepherd University (Cornel School of Contemporary Music) awarded Tommy Walker with an “Honorary Doctorate in Music Arts”.

== Musical style ==
=== Influences ===
Tommy Walker has cited Justo Almario, Abraham Laboriel, Andrae Crouch, Lindell Cooley and Darlene Zschech as influences.

== Personal life ==
Tommy Walker is the son of Fred and Eileen Walker, who were the pastors of an independent charismatic church. Tommy Walker is married to Robin Walker, and they have four children.

== Discography ==
- Pray For Each Other - C.A. Worship Band (1991)
- We Say Yes - C.A. Worship Band (1992)
- Live Worship - Tommy Walker and the C.A. Worship Band (1994)
- Yes We All Agree - C.A. Worship Band (1996)
- C.A. Worship Band with Tommy Walker (1997)
- Acoustic Hymns - C.A. Worship Band with Tommy Walker (1997)
- Live At Home - C.A. Worship Band with Tommy Walker (1999)
- Never Gonna Stop with Tommy Walker (2000)
- Calling Out To You - C.A. Worship Band with Tommy Walker (2001)
- There Is a Rock - Tommy Walker and the C.A. Worship Band (2002)
- Make It Glorious - Tommy Walker (2004)
- Anthology [1991-2002] - C.A. Worship Band with Tommy Walker (2004)
- Break Through - Tommy Walker (2006)
- This is What Christmas Means to Me - Tommy Walker and the C.A. Worship Band (2007)
- I Have A Hope - Tommy Walker (2008)
- Overflow - Tommy Walker (2009)
- The Pursuit of God: Songs For A Longing Soul - Tommy Walker (2011)
- Generation Hymns Live with Tommy Walker (2012)
- Acoustic Hymns (2014 Re-Release) - Tommy Walker and the C.A. Worship Band (2014)
- Generation Hymns 2 - Tommy Walker with Sean Beck and the CBC Choir (2015)
- The Best of Song of the Week with Tommy Walker (2016)
- The Book of John in Song - Tommy Walker (2018)
- Song of the Week Volume 1 - Tommy Walker (2019)
- Song of the Week Volume 2 - Tommy Walker (2019)
- Generation Carols - Tommy Walker (2019)
- Song of the Week Volume 3 - Tommy Walker (2020)
- Generation Hymns en Español - Tommy Walker (2020)
- Highest Praises - Tommy Walker and Eileen Walker (2021)
- Generation Hymns 3 - Tommy Walker (2022)
- Soulful Scripture Songs - Tommy Walker (2023)
- Soulful Scripture Songs KIDS - Tommy Walker (2025)
- Reawaken: Live at Home Again - Tommy Walker (2026)

== Singles ==
- I'm Going to Bethlehem (2008)
- He Knows My Name (2008)

== Charts ==
Albums - Billboard (North America)

Year	Album	Peak Chart Positions	
Year	Album	Top Independent Albums	Billboard 200 Albums
2001	Never Gonna Stop	#6	#153

== Bibliography ==
- Songs From Heaven. Regal Books, 2001, ISBN 0-8307-3783-9 (with Phil Kassel)
- 52 Devotional Thoughts for Worship Leaders. Sundog, 2004, ISBN 1-932203-62-1
- He Knows My Name. Regal Books, 2004, ISBN 0-8307-3636-0
- Breakthrough. Regal Books, 2006, ISBN 0830738339—(with Marcus Brotherton)

== Award Nominations ==
GMA Dove Awards

Year	Nominee / work	Award	Result
2006	Great and Marvelous-Celebrating the Songs of Tommy Walker Vol. 2	Choral Collection of the Year	Nominated
