= Otmaro Ruíz =

Venezuelan pianist, composer, and educator

Otmaro Ruiz
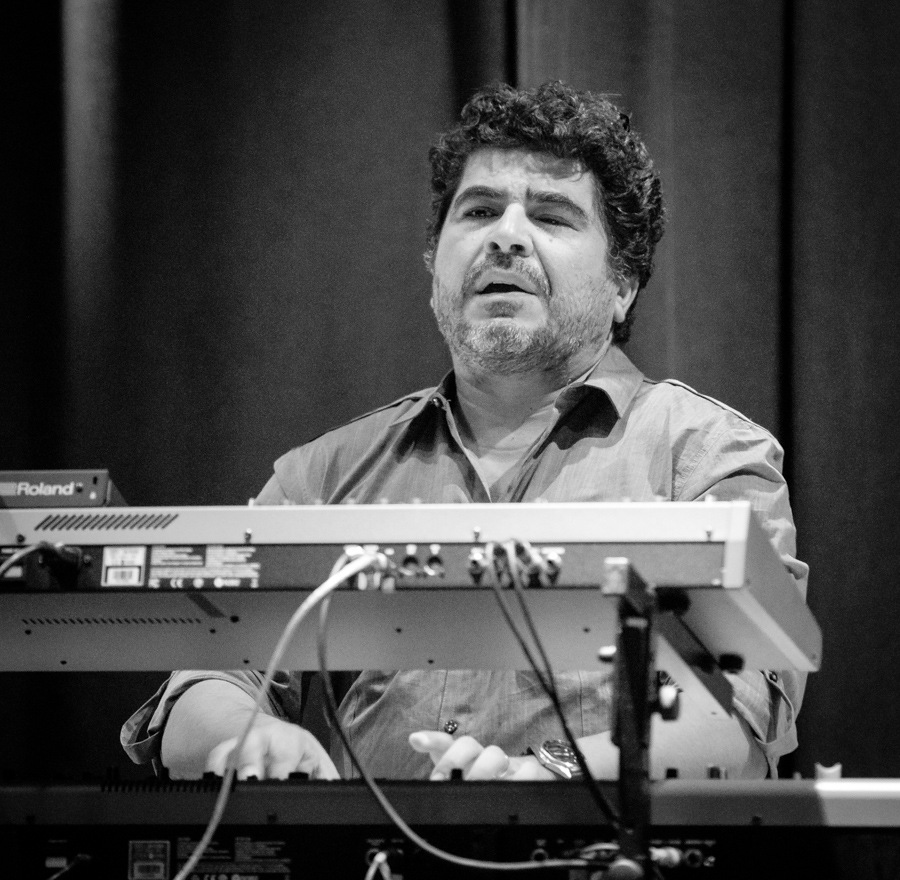
- Ruiz on stage at Simon Phillips concert in Oslo (2017)

Background information
- Born: June 27, 1964 (age 62); Caracas, Venezuela
- Origin: Venezuelan
- Genres: Jazz, Latin genres
- Occupations: Arranger, Composer, Music director
- Instruments: Acoustic piano, Keyboards, Acoustic guitar
- Years active: 1980–present
- Website: Home page

Otmaro Ruiz (born June 27, 1964) is a Venezuelan pianist, keyboardist, composer, arranger and educator. Son of Óscar Ruiz Beluche and Omaira Prado Hurtado, both medical doctors. He has a sister named Orlena, also a musician (violin, piano) and educator.

== Career ==
Ruiz began his formal musical studies at the age of eight on piano, classical guitar, harmony, history and aesthetics. His formal musical studies were done in the Juan Manuel Olivares Music School in Caracas. In the meantime, he also was exposed to other artistic activities, such as drawing and acting. At the same time, he studied organ and pursued a scientific career as a biologist at the Simón Bolívar University, but kept playing keyboards on the side, landing his first professional work in a pop group in 1980.

Decided to focus entirely on music, Ruiz dropped out of school in 1983 while playing in his native Venezuela, where he toured and recorded with local and visiting musicians, and also became a busy studio musician as a jingles composer and arranger.

In 1989 Ruiz moved to Los Angeles, California, where he finished his academic training at CalArts, obtaining a master's degree in jazz performance in 1993. In between, he was also playing with percussionist Alex Acuña, appearing in two albums during the early 1990s. and later recorded with Arturo Sandoval, which was followed by a world tour supporting Gino Vannelli in 1996.

Ruiz marked the transition into the new millennium performing on both acoustic piano and electric keyboards with rock icons Jon Anderson and Robbie Robertson, Latin Crossings Project, featuring Latin legend Tito Puente, Steve Winwood and Arturo Sandoval, Herb Alpert and Fusion giant John McLaughlin, also taking part in recordings and multiple World tours with multi Grammy Award winner vocalist Dianne Reeves, Frank Gambale, Alain Caron and Lee Ritenour.

Ruiz also participated in an international jazz group named JB Project, along with American bassist Brian Bromberg and Japanese drummer Akira Jimbo. This group released three studio albums: Brombo (2003), Brombo II (2004) and Brombo III (2017). Additionally, he appeared on Akira Jimbo's CDs projects for eleven consecutive years as member of a Trio/Quartet format.

In 2012, the Cornel School of Contemporary Music of Shepherd University awarded Ruiz with an Honorary Doctorate in Music Arts. Then, in 2016, he was nominated for the Best Arrangement Instrumental & Vocals at the 58th Annual Grammy Awards for his version of the tune "Girl from Ipanema", which was part of his production Catina DeLuna and Lado B Brazilian Project, featuring Otmaro Ruiz. This CD also got raving international reviews, including four stars by DownBeat magazine and also was included in their issue Best of 2016.

Furthermore, Ruiz has conducted workshops and lectures worldwide and formed part of the faculty of USC Thornton School of Music for five years. Otmaro also worked as a member of the Cornell School of Contemporary Music based at Shepherd University faculty, as part of a team that includes long time friends and collaborators Abraham Laboriel and Jimmy Branly. In recent years, Otmaro Ruiz released his long dreamed "electric" CD in Trio format with famed musicians Jimmy Haslip and Jimmy Branly entitled "Elemental" to amazing international reviews, also became a member of Simon Phillips' influential Jazz Rock Fusion Band "Protocol" and Toured with SoulBop, a Modern Electric Jazz ensemble conducted by Randy Brecker and Bill Evans. Ruiz remains active up to the present day, generally recording and touring with L.A.-based groups and vocalists, as well as commanding his own projects.

== Selected discography ==
=== As a leader ===
- Otmaro Ruiz plays Ryuichi Sakamoto (MIDI Inc., 1991)
- Nothing to Hide (MMP Records, 1996)
- Distant Friends (MLP Records, 1997)
- Latino featuring Alex Acuña and Abe Laboriel (Pony Canyon Inc, 2005)
- Sojourn (Minina Music / Moondo Records, 2008)
- Catina DeLuna and Lado B Brazilian Project Featuring Otmaro Ruiz (Independent, 2015)
- Elemental featuring Jimmy Haslip and Jimmy Branly (Blue Canoe, 2018)

=== Other credits ===
- En Vivo - Ilan Chester (1989)
- En Concierto - Soledad Bravo (1989)
- Thinking of You - Alex Acuña (1991)
- Imagen Latina - Alberto Naranjo (1992)
- Dream Come True - Arturo Sandoval (1993)
- Deseo - Jon Anderson (1994)
- Passages - Frank Gambale (1995)
- The Latin Train - Arturo Sandoval (1995)
- Si el Norte fuera el Sur - Ricardo Arjona (1996)
- Passion Dance - Herb Alpert (1997)
- Plomo Revienta - Desorden Público (1997)
- Strive for Higher Realities - Pedro Eustache (1997)
- Red Heat - Jimmy Haslip (2000)
- The Heart of Things : Live in Paris - John McLaughlin (2000)
- Call Me Al - Alain Caron (2001)
- Baila Cinderella - Hubert Laws (2002)
- TruANT - Alien Ant Farm (2003)
- Brombo - Brian Bromberg / Akira Jimbo (2003)
- Cancionero del Amor Puertorriqueño - Ilan Chester (2003)
- Brombo II - Brian Bromberg / Akira Jimbo (2004)
- Live in Montreal [DVD] - Dianne Reeves (2005)
- Aneurythms - Jeff Berlin (2006)
- Natural High - Frank Gambale (2006)
- Industrial Zen - John McLaughlin (2006)
- Music for Lovers - Dianne Reeves (2007)
- Flying Over Bridges - Ashley Maher (2007)
- Conversations - Alain Caron (2008) / Also with Oliver Jones, Lorraine Desmarais and François Bourassa, among others
- Natural Selection - Frank Gambale (2010)
- Born in the 80's - Hadrien Feraud (2015)
- Brombo III - Brian Bromberg / Akira Jimbo (2017)
