= Alphonso Johnson =

American bassist (born 1951)

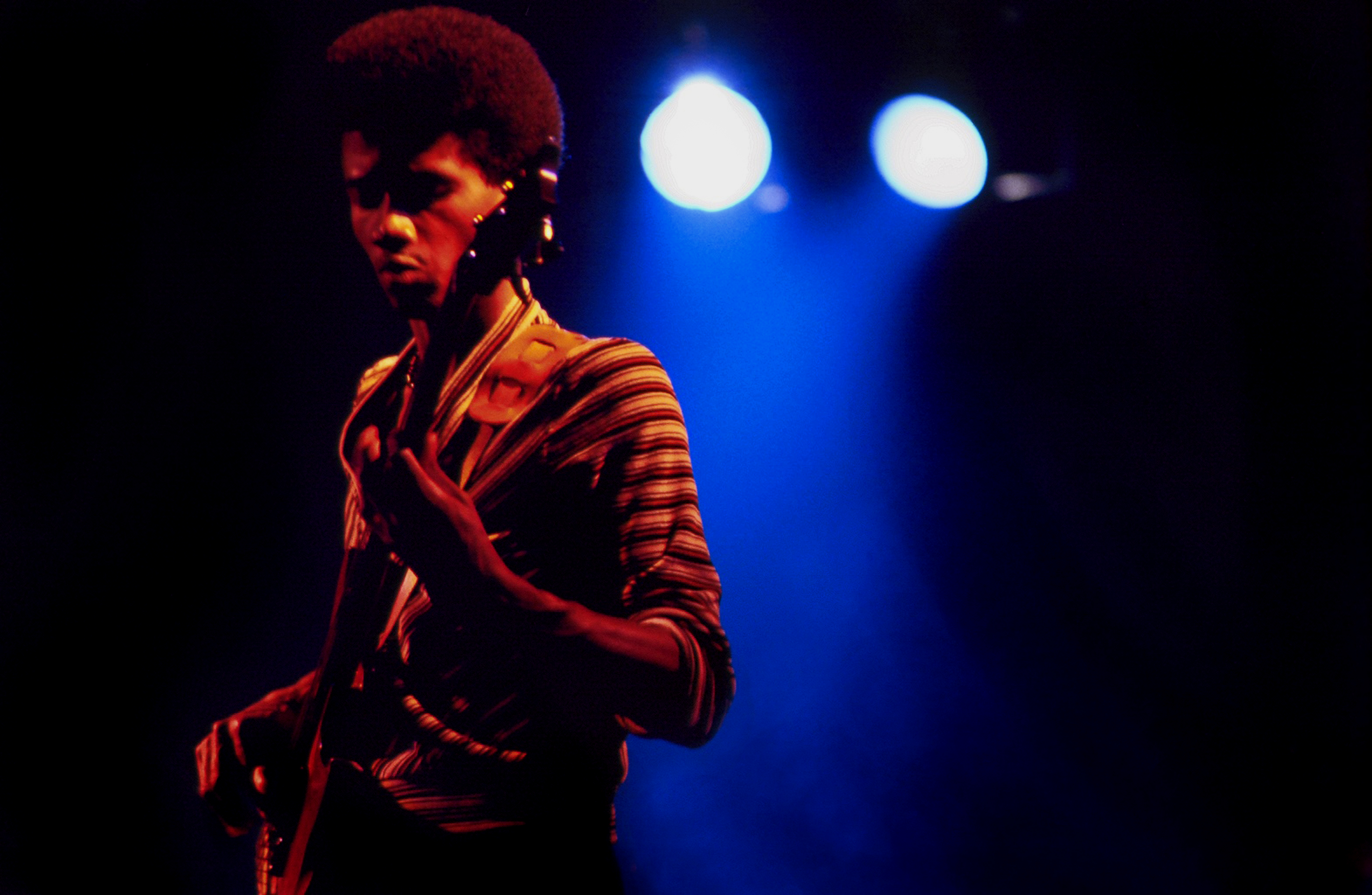
- Johnson in Rochester, New York, 1977

Background information
- Born: February 2, 1951 (age 75); Philadelphia, Pennsylvania, U.S.
- Genres: Jazz fusion; jazz; funk
- Occupations: Musician; composer; educator
- Instruments: Bass guitar; double bass; Chapman stick
- Years active: 1970–present
- Label: Epic/CBS Records
- Website: www.embamba.com

Alphonso Johnson (born February 2, 1951) is an American jazz bassist active since the early 1970s. Johnson was a member of the jazz fusion group Weather Report from 1973 to 1975, and has performed and recorded with numerous high-profile rock and jazz acts including Santana, Phil Collins, members of the Grateful Dead, Steve Kimock, Jeffrey Osborne and Chet Baker.

== Biography ==
Born in Philadelphia, Pennsylvania, United States, Johnson started off as an upright bass player, but switched to the electric bass in his late teens. Beginning his career in the early 1970s, Johnson showed innovation and fluidity on the electric bass. He sessioned with a few jazz musicians before landing a job with Weather Report, taking over for co-founding member Miroslav Vitous. Johnson debuted with Weather Report on the album Mysterious Traveller. He appeared on two more Weather Report albums: Tale Spinnin' (1975) and Black Market (1976) before he left the band to work with drummer Billy Cobham. During 1976–77 he recorded three solo albums as a band leader, for the Epic label, in a fusion-funk vein.

Johnson was one of the first musicians to introduce the Chapman Stick to the public. In 1977, his knowledge of the instrument offered him a rehearsal with Genesis, who were looking for a replacement for guitarist Steve Hackett. Being more of a bassist than a guitarist, Johnson instead recommended his friend Daryl Stuermer, who would go on to remain a member of Genesis's touring band until the band's final concert in 2022.

Johnson was one of two bass players on Phil Collins's first solo album, Face Value, in 1981.

In early 1982, Johnson joined Grateful Dead member Bob Weir's side project Bobby and the Midnites. He would reunite with Weir in 2000, playing bass in place of Phil Lesh on tour with The Other Ones. He has also performed fusion versions of Grateful Dead songs alongside Billy Cobham in the band Jazz Is Dead.

In 1996, Johnson played bass on tracks "Dance on a Volcano" and "Fountain of Salmacis" on Steve Hackett's Genesis Revisited album.

Later in 1996, Johnson toured Europe and Japan with composer and saxophonist Wayne Shorter, pianist James Beard, drummer Rodney Holmes, and guitarist David Gilmore.

He has an extensive experience as a bass teacher and has conducted bass seminars and clinics in Germany, England, France, Scotland, Ireland, Japan, Switzerland, Australia, Brazil and Argentina.

Johnson started his college education at Pierce College, and then transferred to California State University, Northridge, where he earned a Bachelor of Arts in Music Education in 2014. As an undergraduate student, Johnson performed as a member of the CSUN Wind Ensemble. He pursued his graduate degree at CSU Northridge, earning a Master of Arts in Secondary Curriculum and Instruction in 2021. He serves as an adjunct instructor at the University of Southern California and the California Institute of the Arts.

== Equipment ==
=== Electric basses ===
- Fender Precision, extensively modified
- Chapman Stick
- Lobue Custom
- Warwick Alphonso Johnson Custom Shop Bass Guitar
- Warwick Infinity
- Vigier Arpege 5 fretless
- Modulus Quantum 5 String Fretted and Fretless Bass

=== Acoustic basses ===
- Washburn AB45

== Discography ==
=== As leader/co-leader ===
- Moonshadows (Epic, 1976)
- Yesterday's Dreams (Epic, 1976)
- Spellbound (Epic, 1977)
- Alivemutherforya with Billy Cobham, Steve Khan, Tom Scott (Columbia, 1978)

=== As a member ===
Weather Report

- Mysterious Traveller (Columbia, 1974) – rec. 1973–74
- Tale Spinnin' (Columbia, 1975)
- Black Market (Columbia, 1976) – rec. 1975–76

Santana

- Beyond Appearances (Columbia, 1985) – rec. 1984
- Freedom (Columbia, 1987)
- Spirits Dancing in the Flesh (Columbia, 1990)

Jazz Is Dead

- Blue Light Rain (Zebra, 1998)
- Laughing Water (Zebra, 1999) – live
- Great Sky River (Zebra, 2001) – live
- Grateful Jazz (Pet Peev, 2015) – rec. 2004

=== As sideman ===
With Bob Weir

- Bobby and the Midnites (Arista, 1981)
- Where the Beat Meets the Street (Columbia, 1984)

With others

- Chet Baker, You Can't Go Home Again (Horizon, 1977)
- Dee Dee Bridgewater, Just Family (Elektra, 1977)
- George Cables, Shared Secrets (MuseFX, 2001)
- Phil Collins, Face Value (Virgin, 1981)
- George Duke, The Aura Will Prevail (MPS, 1975)
- George Duke, Liberated Fantasies (MPS, 1976)
- George Duke-Billy Cobham Band, Live On Tour In Europe (Atlantic, 1976)
- Steve Hackett, Genesis Revisited (Camino, 1996)
- Eddie Henderson, Sunburst (Blue Note, 1975)
- Allan Holdsworth, Velvet Darkness (CTI, 1976)
- Chuck Mangione, Land of Make Believe (Mercury, 1973)
- Hermeto Pascoal, Slaves Mass (Warner Bros., 1977)
- Pino Daniele, Bella 'mbriana (EMI Italiana, 1982)
- Abraxas Pool, Abraxas Pool (Miramar, 1997)
- Flora Purim, Open Your Eyes You Can Fly (Milestone, 1976)
- Carlos Santana and Wayne Shorter, Live at the 1988 Montreux Jazz Festival (Image Entertainment, 2005)
- Sarah Vaughan, Brazilian Romance (Columbia Records 1987)
