= Frank Gambale =

Australian jazz fusion guitarist (born 1958)

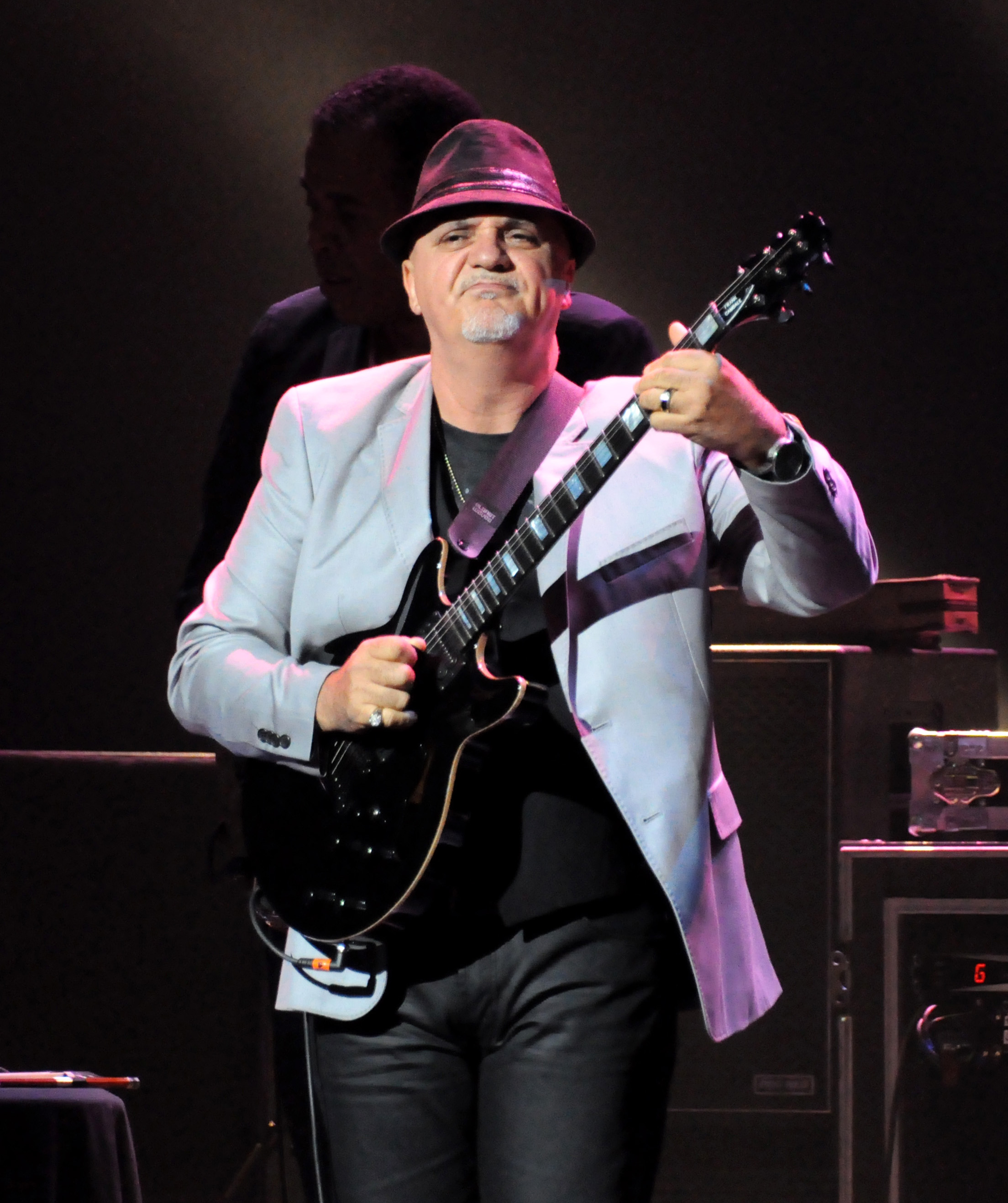
- Gambale performing in Montreal, 2010

Background information
- Born: Frank Gambale; 30 December 1958 (age 67)
- Origin: Canberra, Australia
- Genres: Jazz fusion, smooth jazz, jazz, instrumental rock
- Occupations: Musician, composer, producer
- Instrument: Guitar
- Years active: 1984–present
- Labels: Legato, Victor, Favored Nations, Wombat
- Formerly of: Chick Corea Elektric Band, Vital Information, Return to Forever
- Website: frankgambale.com

Frank Gambale (/ɡæmˈbɑːlɪ/ gam-BAH-lee; born 22 December 1958) is an Australian jazz fusion guitarist. He has released twenty albums over a period of three decades, and is known for his use of the sweep picking and economy picking techniques.

== Recording career ==
=== Solo albums ===
Gambale graduated from the Guitar Institute of Technology in Hollywood with Student of the Year honours and taught there from 1984 to 1986.

=== Bands ===
With the Mark Varney Project, consisting of Allan Holdsworth, Brett Garsed, and Shawn Lane, he recorded two albums, Truth in Shredding (1990) and Centrifugal Funk (1991).

Beginning in 1987, he spent six years as a member of the Chick Corea Elektric Band, playing with Eric Marienthal, John Patitucci, and Dave Weckl. With Corea's band he recorded five albums and shared two Grammy Award nominations. He spent twelve years as a member of Vital Information, led by Steve Smith. He reunited with the Elektric Band in 2002 and with Corea in 2011 when he joined Return to Forever IV with Stanley Clarke, Jean-Luc Ponty, and Lenny White.

== Teaching ==
Gambale was the head of the guitar department at the Los Angeles Music Academy. He joined the Isina mentorship program as head of the guitar department in 2014. During the next year, he started an online guitar school.

== Technique ==
Gambale has become identified with sweep picking and economy picking. His interest grew out of a desire to transcend the physical limits of the guitar and borrow from other instruments, such as the piano and saxophone. One advantage of the technique is that it allows him to play faster. He can also approximate the way chords are played on piano by using his invented tuning, the Gambale Tuning, in which "the whole guitar is tuned up a fourth, but the top two strings are down an octave" (A, D, G, C, E, A, low to high).

Gambale explained the tuning on Facebook:

So, here is GAMBALE TUNING explained...and it only took me 40 years to invent this! ADGCEA. It's the same relative tuning as regular guitar but the lowest string is the 5th string A instead of the regular low E. Also, the 1st and 2nd strings are one octave lower. Here's the suggested string gauges. From low to high use strings from an electric 10 gauge standard set. Use only the A D G and B strings for the 6th, 5th, 4th and 3rd strings. The B string will be tuned up a half step to C. Then for the 1st and 2nd strings use a D and a G string from a standard 09 gauge set. These two strings are to be tuned up a whole step so the D will be tuned to E as the 2nd string wound, and the G will be tuned to A as the 1st string.

| Standard tuning (regular light gauge strings) | 46 | 36 | 26 | 17 | 13 | 10 |
| Pitch | E2 | A2 | D3 | G3 | B3 | E4 |
| Gambale tuning | 36 | 26 | 17 | 13 | 24 | 16 |
| Pitch | A2 | D3 | G3 | C4 | E3 | A3 |

== Influence ==
Gambale has been featured on the covers of many guitar and jazz-oriented magazines worldwide, while having been cited as an influence by many notable guitarists including Synyster Gates, Dweezil Zappa, Greg Howe, and Pat Metheny. In a 1991 interview with Rolling Stone magazine, guitarist Jerry Garcia stated that Gambale was one of his favourite players at the time, stating, "My personal favorite lately is this guy Frank Gambale, who's been playing with Chick Corea for the past couple of years."

== Discography ==
=== As leader ===
- 1986 Brave New Guitar (Legato)
- 1987 A Present for the Future (Legato)
- 1989 Live! (Legato)
- 1990 Thunder from Down Under (JVC)
- 1991 Note Worker (JVC)
- 1993 The Great Explorers (JVC)
- 1994 Passages (JVC)
- 1995 Thinking Out Loud (JVC)
- 2000 Coming to Your Senses (Favored Nations)
- 2004 Raison D'être (ESC)
- 2004 Resident Alien - Live Bootlegs (Wombat)
- 2004 Resident Alien - Live Bootlegs Disc Two (Wombat)
- 2006 Natural High (Wombat)
- 2010 Natural Selection (Wombat)
- 2012 Frank Gambale Soulmine feat. Boca (Wombat)
- 2018 Salve

=== As co-leader/band member ===
With Vital Information

- 1988 Fiafiaga
- 1991 Vital Live
- 1992 Easier Done Than Said
- 1996 Ray of Hope
- 1998 Where We Come From
- 2000 Live Around the World
- 2000 Live from Mars
- 2002 Show 'em Where You Live
- 2004 Come on In
- 2012 Live! One Great Night

With Chick Corea Elektric Band

- 1987 Light Years
- 1988 Eye of the Beholder
- 1990 Inside Out
- 1991 Beneath the Mask
- 1996 The Songs of West Side Story
- 2004 To the Stars
- 2004 Chick Corea Elektric Band – Live at Montreux (DVD)

With Return to Forever

- 2012 The Mothership Returns (2CD + DVD)

With GHS (Gambale/Hamm/Smith)

- 1998 Show Me What You Can Do
- 2000 The Light Beyond
- 2002 GHS 3

With MVP (The Mark Varney Project)

- 1990 Truth in Shredding (with Allan Holdsworth)
- 1991 Centrifugal Funk (with Shawn Lane and Brett Garsed)

With Donati & Fierabracci

- 2007 Made In Australia

With Maurizio Colonna

- 2000 Imagery Suite (also known as Playgame)
- 2005 Live
- 2007 Bon Voyage

With Maurizo Vercon

- 2008 For You Featuring Frank Gambale

With GRP Super Live

- 1988 GRP Super Live – in Concert

With School of the Arts featuring T Lavitz

- 2007 School of the Arts (Magnatude)

=== As featured artist ===
- 2023 Markus Venehsalo & Mavon Safia: Projekt 13 (feat. Frank Gambale) (Eclipse Music)

== Instructional videos ==
- 1988: Monster Licks & Speed Picking
- 1991: Modes: No More Mystery
- 1993: Chopbuilder: The Ultimate Guitar Workout
- 2003: Concert with Class
- 2007: Acoustic Improvisation

== Instructional books ==
- 1985: Speed Picking (REH)
- 1994: The Frank Gambale Technique Book I
- 1994: The Frank Gambale Technique Book II
- 1997: Improvisation Made Easier
- 1997: The Best of Frank Gambale
