= Zebra Records =

American jazz/fusion record label

Zebra Records is an American independent jazz/fusion record label originally based on Encino, Los Angeles. In 1985, it reached a distribution agreement with Enja Records to distribute their music in the United States, including the music of David Grisman.

== See also ==
- List of record labels
