= Soundtrack =

Recorded sound accompanying a production such as a film

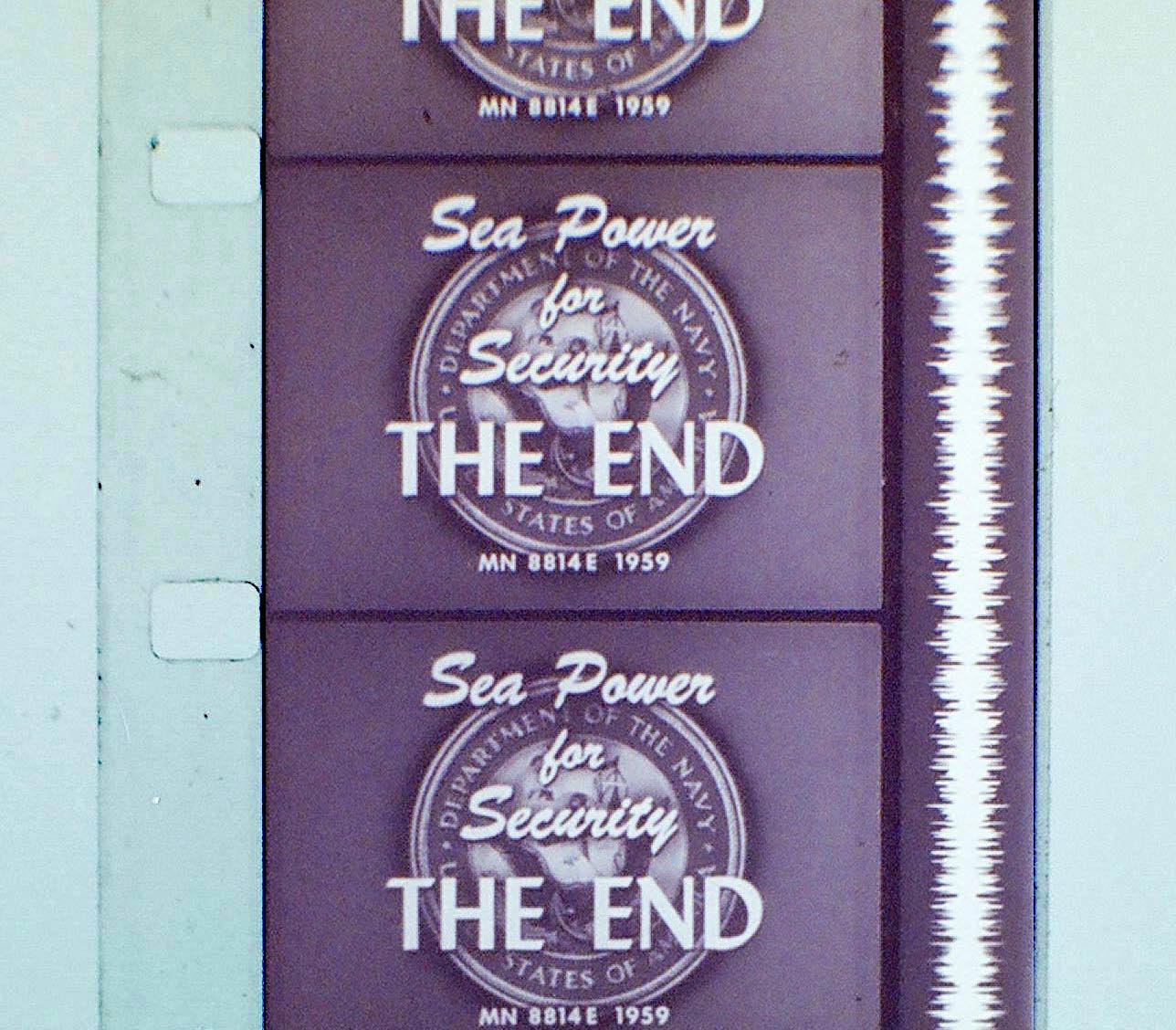
16 mm film showing a sound track at right

A soundtrack is a recorded audio signal accompanying and synchronised to the images of a book, drama, motion picture, radio program, television program, or video game; colloquially, a commercially released soundtrack album of music as featured in the soundtrack of a film, video, or television presentation; or the physical area of a film that contains the synchronised recorded sound.

In movie industry terminology usage, a sound track is an audio recording created or used in film production or post-production. Initially, the dialogue, sound effects, and music in a film each has its own separate track, and these are mixed together to make what is called the composite track, which is heard in the film. A dubbing track is often later created when films are dubbed into another language. This is also known as an M&E (music and effects) track. M&E tracks contain all sound elements minus dialogue, which is then supplied by the foreign distributor in the native language of its territory.

Current dictionary entries for soundtrack document soundtrack as a noun, and as a verb. An early attempt at popularizing the term sound track was printed in the magazine Photoplay in 1929. A 1992 technical dictionary entry in the Academic Press Dictionary of Science and Technology does not distinguish between the form sound track and soundtrack.

The contraction soundtrack came into public consciousness with the advent of so-called soundtrack albums in the late 1940s. First conceived by movie companies as a promotional gimmick for new films, these commercially available recordings were labeled and advertised as "music from the original motion picture soundtrack", or "music from and inspired by the motion picture." These phrases were soon shortened to just "original motion picture soundtrack." More accurately, such recordings are made from a film's music track, because they usually consist of isolated music from a film, not the composite (sound) track with dialogue and sound effects.

The term original soundtrack (OST), often used for titles of albums of soundtrack music, is sometimes also used to differentiate the original music heard and recorded versus a rerecording or cover version, and behaves as a unique type of concept album that revolves around a unified theme in a story.

== Types of recordings ==
Types of soundtrack recordings include:

1. Musical film soundtracks are for the film versions of musical theatre; they concentrate primarily on the songs.
  (Examples: Grease, Evita)
2. Film scores showcase the primarily instrumental musical themes and background music from movies.
  (Examples: Blade Runner, Star Wars series)
3. For movies that contain both orchestral film scores and pop songs, both types of music.
  (Examples: Shrek series, Back to the Future series)
4. Albums of popular songs heard in whole or part in the background of non-musical movies.
  (Examples: Top Gun, The Bodyguard)
5. Video game soundtracks are often released after a game's release, usually consisting of the theme and background music from the game's levels, menus, title screens, promo material (such as entire songs of which only segments were used in the game), cut-screens and occasionally sound-effects used in the game.
  (Examples: Final Fantasy VII, Red Dead Redemption 2)
6. Albums which contain both music and dialogue from the film.
  (Examples: Reservoir Dogs, A Star Is Born)

The soundtrack to the 1937 Walt Disney animated film Snow White and the Seven Dwarfs was the first commercially issued film soundtrack. It was released by RCA Victor Records on multiple 78 rpm discs in January 1938 as Songs from Walt Disney's Snow White and the Seven Dwarfs (with the Same Characters and Sound Effects as in the Film of That Title) and has since seen numerous expansions and reissues.

The first live-action musical film to have a commercially issued soundtrack album was MGM's 1946 film biography of Show Boat composer Jerome Kern, Till the Clouds Roll By. The album was originally issued as a set of four 10-inch 78 rpm records. Only eight selections from the film were included in this first edition of the album. In order to fit the songs onto the record sides the musical material needed editing and manipulation. This was before tape existed, so the record producer needed to copy segments from the playback discs used on set, then copy and re-copy them from one disc to another adding transitions and cross-fades until the final master was created. Needless to say, it was several generations removed from the original and the sound quality suffered for it. The playback recordings were purposely recorded very dry (without reverberation); otherwise it would come across as too hollow sounding in large movie theatres. This made these albums sound flat and boxy.

=== Terminology ===
MGM Records called these "original cast albums" in the style of Decca Broadway show cast albums mostly because the material on the discs would not lock to picture, thereby creating the largest distinction between 'Original Motion Picture Soundtrack' which, in its strictest sense would contain music that would lock to picture if the home user would play one alongside the other and 'Original Cast Soundtrack' which in its strictest sense would refer to studio recordings of film music by the original film cast, but which had been edited or rearranged for time and content and would not lock to picture.

In reality, however, soundtrack producers remain ambiguous about this distinction, and titles in which the music on the album does lock to picture may be labeled as OCS and music from an album that does not lock to picture may be referred to as OMPS.

The phrase "recorded directly from the soundtrack" was used for a while in the 1970s, 1980s and 1990s to differentiate material that would lock to picture from that which would not (excluding alternate masters and alternate vocals or solos). However, partly because many 'film takes' actually consisted of several different attempts at the song edited together, over time that term became nebulous as well. For example, in cases where the master take used in the film could not be found in its isolated form (without the M&E), the aforementioned alternate masters and alternate vocal and solo performances might be used instead.

As a result of all this ambiguity, over the years the term soundtrack began to be commonly applied to any recording from a film, whether taken from the actual film soundtrack or re-recorded in the studio at an earlier or later time. The term is also sometimes used for Broadway cast recordings.

Contributing to the vagueness of the term are projects such as The Sound of Music Live!, which was filmed live on the set for an NBC holiday season special first broadcast in 2013. The album, released three days before the broadcast, contained studio pre-recordings by the original cast of all the songs used in the special, but because only the orchestral portion of the material from the album is the same as that used in the special (i.e., the vocals were sung live over a prerecorded track), this creates a similar technicality. Although the instrumental music bed from the CD will lock to picture, the vocal performances will not (although it is possible to create a complete soundtrack recording by lifting the vocal performances from the DVD, erasing the alternate vocal masters from the CD and combining the two).

Among MGM's most notable soundtrack albums were those of the films Good News, Easter Parade, Annie Get Your Gun, Singin' in the Rain, Show Boat, The Band Wagon, Seven Brides for Seven Brothers, and Gigi.

=== Film score albums ===
Film score albums did not really become popular until the LP era, although a few were issued in 78 rpm albums. Alex North's score for the 1951 film version of A Streetcar Named Desire was released on a 10-inch LP by Capitol Records and sold so well that the label rereleased it on one side of a 12-inch LP with some of Max Steiner's film music on the reverse.

Steiner's score for Gone with the Wind has been recorded many times, but when the film was reissued in 1967, MGM Records finally released an album of the famous score recorded directly from the soundtrack. Like the 1967 rerelease of the film, this version of the score was artificially enhanced for stereo. In recent years, Rhino Records has released a 2-CD set of the complete Gone With the Wind score, restored to its original mono sound.

One of the biggest-selling film scores of all time was John Williams' music from the movie Star Wars. Many film score albums go out of print after the films finish their theatrical runs and some have become rare collector's items.

=== Composite film tracks included on record ===
In a few rare instances an entire film dialogue track was issued on records. The 1968 Franco Zeffirelli film of Romeo and Juliet was issued as a 4-LP set, as a single LP with musical and dialogue excerpts, and as an album containing only the film's musical score. The ground-breaking film Who's Afraid of Virginia Woolf? was issued by Warner Bros Records as a 2-LP set containing virtually all the dialogue from the film. RCA Victor also issued a double-album set what was virtually all the dialogue from the film soundtrack of A Man for All Seasons, Decca Records issued a double-album for Man of La Mancha and Disney Music Group (formerly Buena Vista Records) issued a similar double-album for its soundtrack for The Hobbit.

== Film and television soundtracks ==
When a blockbuster film is released, or during and after a television series airs, an album in the form of a soundtrack is typically released alongside that.

A soundtrack typically contains instrumentation or alternatively a film score. But it can also feature songs that were sung or performed by characters in a scene (or a cover version of a song in the media, re-recorded by a popular artist), songs that were used as intentional or unintentional background music in important scenes, songs that were heard in the closing credits, or songs for no apparent reason related to the media other than for promotion, that were included in a soundtrack.

Soundtracks are usually released on major record labels (just as if they were released by a musical artist), and the songs and the soundtrack itself can also be on music charts, and win musical awards.

By convention, a soundtrack record can contain all kinds of music including music inspired by but not actually appearing in the movie; the score contains only music by the original film's composers.

Contemporaneously, a soundtrack can go against normality, (most typically used in popular culture franchises) and contains recently released and/or exclusive never before released original pop music selections, (some of which become high charting records on their own, which due to being released on another franchises title, peaked because of that) and is simply used for promotional purposes for well known artists, or new or unknown artists. These soundtracks contain music not at all heard in the film/television series, and any artistic or lyrical connection is purely coincidental.

However depending on the genre of the media the soundtrack of popular songs would have a set pattern; a lighthearted romance might feature easy listening love songs, whilst a more dark thriller would compose of hard rock or urban music.

In 1908, Camille Saint-Saëns composed the first music specifically for use in a motion picture (L'assasinat du duc de Guise), and releasing recordings of songs used in films became prevalent in the 1930s. Henry Mancini, who won an Emmy Award and two Grammys for his soundtrack to Peter Gunn, was the first composer to have a widespread hit with a song from a soundtrack.

Before the 1970s, soundtracks (with a few exceptions), accompanied towards musicals, and was an album that featured vocal and instrumental, (and instrumental versions of vocal songs) musical selections performed by cast members. Or cover versions of songs sung by another artist.

After the 1970s, soundtracks started to include more diversity, and music consumers would anticipate a motion picture or television soundtrack. Majority of top charting songs were those featured or released on a film or television soundtrack album.

In recent years the term soundtrack sort of subsided. It now mostly commonly refers to instrumental background music used in that media. Popular songs featured in a film or television series are instead highlighted and referenced in the credits, not as part of a soundtrack.

== Psychology of music and film soundtracks ==
In the late 1980s, cognitive psychology and psychology of music started an investigation on the impact that the soundtrack exerts on the interpretation of audiovisual stimuli. Canadian psychologist Annabel J. Cohen is one of the first scholars who systematically studied the relationship between music and moving image within the interpretation process of brief animated videos. Her studies converged in the Congruence-Association Model of music and multimedia. More recent empirical studies proved that the film music goes far beyond the role of an emotionalizing accessory in film contexts; contrarily, it can radically alter the empathy experienced by the viewers toward the characters on screen, attributed emotions (e.g., whether a character is happy or sad), evaluation of the scenic environments, plot anticipations, and moral judgement of the characters. Furthermore, eyetracking and pupillometry studies found that film music is able to influence gaze direction and pupil dilation depending on its emotional valence and semantic information conveyed. Recently, new experiments showed that film music can alter time perception while watching movies; in particular, soundtracks deemed as activating and arousing lead to time overestimation as opposed to more relaxing or sad music. Lastly, soundtracks have been proved to shape the memory of the scene that the viewers form, to the point of biasing their recall coherently with the music's semantic contents.

== Video game soundtracks ==
Soundtrack may also refer to music used in video games. While sound effects were nearly universally used for action happening in the game, music to accompany the gameplay was a later development. Rob Hubbard and Martin Galway were early composers of music specifically for video games for the 1980s Commodore 64 computer. Koji Kondo was an early and important composer for Nintendo games. As the technology improved, polyphonic and often orchestral soundtracks replaced simple monophonic melodies starting in the late 1980s and the soundtracks to popular games such as the Dragon Quest and Final Fantasy series began to be released separately. In addition to compositions written specifically for video games, the advent of CD technology allowed developers to incorporate licensed songs into their soundtrack (the Grand Theft Auto series is a good example of this). Furthermore, when Microsoft released the Xbox in 2001, it featured an option allowing users to customize the soundtrack for certain games by ripping a CD to the hard-drive.

== Theme park, cruise ship, and event soundtracks ==
As in Sound of Music Live! the music or dialogue in question was prepared specifically for use in or at an event such as that described above.

In the case of theme parks, actors may be ensconced in large costumes where their faces may be obscured. They mime along to a prerecorded music, effects and narration track that may sound as if it was lifted from a movie, or may sound as if it had been overly dramatized for effect.

In the case of cruise ships, the small stage spaces do not allow for full orchestration, so that possibly the larger instruments may be pre-recorded onto a backing track and the remaining instruments may play live, or the reverse may occur in such instances as Elvis: The Concert or Sinatra: His Voice. His World. His Way both of which use isolated vocal and video performances accompanied by a live band.

In the case of event soundtracks, large public gatherings such as Hands Across America, The Live Aid Concert, the 200th Anniversary Celebration of the U.S. Constitution in Philadelphia, The MUSE Concerts or the various Greenpeace events (i.e. The First International Greenpeace Record Project, Rainbow Warriors and Alternative NRG) all had special music, effects and dialogue written especially for the event which later went on sale to the record and later video-buying public.

== Book soundtracks ==
Only a few cases exist of an entire soundtrack being written specifically for a book.

'Kaladin', a book soundtrack to popular fantasy novelist Brandon Sanderson's book, 'The Way of Kings', was written by The Black Piper. The Black Piper, hailing from Provo, Utah, is a combined group of composers who share a love for fantasy literature. 'Kaladin' was funded through Kickstarter and raised over $112,000. It was released December 2017.

A New York Times Bestselling series, Green Rider by Kristen Britain, celebrated its 25th anniversary with the release of a book soundtrack by the same name. It was recorded in Utah, featuring artist Jenny Oaks Baker and William Arnold and was released in 2018.

A soundtrack for J. R. R. Tolkien's The Hobbit and The Lord of the Rings was composed by Craig Russell for the San Luis Obispo Youth Symphony. Commissioned in 1995, it was finally put on disk in 2000 by the San Luis Obispo Symphony.

For the 1996 Star Wars novel Shadows of the Empire (written by author Steve Perry), Lucasfilm chose Joel McNeely to write a score. This was an eccentric, experimental project, in contrast to all other soundtracks, as the composer was allowed to convey general moods and themes, rather than having to write music to flow for specific scenes. A project called "Sine Fiction" has made some soundtracks to novels by science fiction writers like Isaac Asimov and Arthur C. Clarke, and has thus far released 19 soundtracks to science-fiction novels or short stories. All of them are available for free download.

Author L. Ron Hubbard composed and recorded a soundtrack album to his novel Battlefield Earth entitled Space Jazz. He marketed the concept album as "the only original sound track ever produced for a book before it becomes a movie". There are two other soundtracks to Hubbard novels, being Mission Earth by Edgar Winter and To the Stars by Chick Corea.

The 1985 novel Always Coming Home by Ursula K. Le Guin originally came in a box set with an audiocassette entitled Music and Poetry of the Kesh, featuring three performances of poetry, and ten musical compositions by Todd Barton.

In comics, Daniel Clowes' graphic novel Like a Velvet Glove Cast in Iron had an official soundtrack album. The original black-and-white Nexus #3 from Capitol comics included the Flexi-Nexi which was a soundtrack flexi-disc for the issue. Trosper by Jim Woodring included a soundtrack album composed and performed by Bill Frisell, and the Absolute Edition of The League of Extraordinary Gentlemen: Black Dossier is planned to include an original vinyl record. The Crow released a soundtrack album called Fear and Bullets to coincide with the limited edition hardcover copy of the graphic novel. The comic book Hellblazer released an annual with a song called Venus of the Hardsell, which was then recorded and a music video to accompany with.

The Brazilian graphic novel Achados e Perdidos (Lost and Found), by Eduardo Damasceno and Luís Felipe Garrocho, had an original soundtrack composed by musician Bruno Ito. The book was self-published in 2011 after a crowdfunding campaign and was accompanied by a CD with eight songs (one for each chapter of the story). In 2012, this graphic novel won the Troféu HQ Mix (Brazilian most important comic book award) in the category "Special Homage".

As Internet access became more widespread, a similar practice developed of accompanying a printed work with a downloadable theme song, rather than a complete and physically published album. The theme songs for Nextwave, Runaways, Achewood, and Dinosaur Comics are examples of this. The novella Chasing Homer (2019) by László Krasznahorkai was published with an original soundtrack by Miklos Szilveszter, accessible through a QR code at the start of each chapter.

In Japan, such examples of music inspired by a work and not intended to soundtrack a radio play or motion picture adaptation of it are known as an image album or image song, though this definition also includes such things as film score demos inspired by concept art and songs inspired by a TV series that are not featured in them. Many audiobooks have some form of musical accompaniment, but these are generally not extensive enough to be released as a separate soundtrack.

== See also ==
- Audio restoration
- Cast recording – for musical theater
- Film score
- Image song
- Jingle
- List of film score composers
- Hindi film music
- Musivisual language
- Soundtrack album
- Soundtrack.Net
- Production music
