= The Road to Freedom (L. Ron Hubbard album) =

Studio album by L. Ron Hubbard
- Released: 1986
- Recorded: 1984–1986
- Genre: Pop
- Length: 45:54
- Label: Revenimus Music Publishing
- Producer: Church of Scientology and Golden Era Studios

L. Ron Hubbard chronology
Mission Earth (1986)	The Road to Freedom (1986)

Alternative cover
- Updated CD cover

The Road to Freedom is a 1986 record album by "L. Ron Hubbard & Friends". Artists that worked on the album include John Travolta, Chick Corea, Leif Garrett, Frank Stallone, and Karen Black.

== Production and marketing ==
The album was produced by the Church of Scientology and their recording studio Golden Era Productions. The Church of Scientology says the album achieved its gold record within four months of its release. The cover art for the original album and the updated version of the same cover feature a long bridge meandering off into the sky. This is reminiscent of "The Bridge to Total Freedom" that appears on the Scientology introductory book, What is Scientology. The album was promoted with a live performance, which was recorded and sold by the Church of Scientology.

The Church of Scientology put out advertising directed towards its WISE International membership that directed them to order multiple copies of the album (offered in half-dozen lots) to give to associates as a means to introduce people to the concepts of Scientology. The advertising calls this album "the perfect dissemination tool". This album was published by Revenimus Music Publishing, the music publishing division of the Church of Scientology, which also published the album Mission Earth, which was also written by L. Ron Hubbard and produced, arranged, and performed by Edgar Winter.

== Reception ==
The album was panned by critics. Jonathan Leggett of The Guardian compared it to the 2001 album The Joy of Creating - The Golden Era Musicians And Friends Play L Ron Hubbard which features Doug E. Fresh and Isaac Hayes, writing, "As with Joy of Creating, the lyrics are rotten." Leggett noted, at one stage Travolta croons: "'Reality is me, reality is you. Yeah, yeah, yeah...'" He wrote critically of the album, commenting, "Although praised on websites as 'a musical masterpiece' it actually sounds like the kind of jazz noodle that they used to demonstrate CD players in Dixons in the 1980s."

== In popular culture ==
Writer Kyle Jarrow incorporated musical themes from The Road to Freedom into the songs he wrote for his 2003 Obie Award-winning play, A Very Merry Unauthorized Children's Scientology Pageant. Jarrow explained that he was trying to discover what liturgical music existed in Scientology, and he came to believe that there were strong correlations between the album and 1980s pop.

== Track listing ==
All tracks are written by L. Ron Hubbard.

The Road to Freedom
No.	Title	Performer(s)	Length
1.	"The Road to Freedom"	John Travolta, Leif Garrett, Frank Stallone, Lee Purcell	4:34
2.	"The Worried Being"	Amanda Ambrose	4:05
3.	"The Way to Happiness"	Leif Garrett, Gayle Moran, Nicky Hopkins	5:43
4.	"Make It Go Right"	David Pomeranz	3:59
5.	"Laugh a Little"	Michael Roberts, Pam Roberts, Margie Nelson	3:37
6.	"The Good Go Free"	David Pomeranz	4:28
7.	"Why Worship Death?"	Chick Corea, Julia Migenes	6:16
8.	"The Evil Purpose"	Frank Stallone	4:28
9.	"The ARC Song"	John Travolta, Karen Black, Jeff Pomerantz, Frank Stallone, Lee Purcell, Gloria Rusch	6:19
10.	"L’envoi, Thank You for Listening"	L. Ron Hubbard	2:25

== See also ==
- Space Jazz, 1982 L. Ron Hubbard album companion to his novel Battlefield Earth
- Mission Earth, 1989 Edgar Winter album based on Hubbard's novel series
- To the Stars, 2004 Chick Corea Elektric Band album based on Hubbard's 1954 novel
