= Mission Earth (album) =

Soundtrack album by Edgar Winter

Soundtrack album by Edgar Winter
- Released: 1989; Copyrighted in 1985
- Genre: Space rock
- Length: 37:08
- Labels: Revenimus; Rhino
- Producer: Edgar Winter

Edgar Winter chronology
| Standing on a Rock (1981) | Mission Earth (1989) | Not a Kid Anymore (1994) |

Professional ratings
Review scores
| Source | Rating |
|---|---|
| AllMusic | 1.5/5 stars |

Mission Earth is a 1989 album by Edgar Winter based on L. Ron Hubbard's novel series of the same name with words and music credited to Hubbard. It is the second soundtrack to one of Hubbard's books, following 1982's Space Jazz, which was an L. Ron Hubbard solo project serving as the soundtrack for Battlefield Earth.

== Production ==
L. Ron Hubbard left detailed instructions and audio tapes for the musicians and producers to follow when making this album, which was released after Hubbard's death. Edgar described Mission Earth as "both a return to rock's primal roots and yet highly experimental". Winter had glowing words for Hubbard when he wrote, "Ron's technical insight of the recording process was outstanding." Winter also described Hubbard's delineation of counter-rhythm in rock as something "which was nothing short of phenomenal, particularly inasmuch as it had then been entirely unexplored and only later heard in the African-based rhythms of Paul Simon's work, some five years after Ron's analysis."

== Release and reception ==
This album was issued by Rhino Records. It's disputed as to when the album released. Some sources say 1986, but the few news coverage of the album is from 1989, and the cover's copyright notice says 1985. Rhino predicted sales of 800,000 copies, but the album would only sell 15,000 upon its release. The only known professional review of the album is from Michael B. Smith of AllMusic.com, who gave it 2.5 stars out of 5. Smith wrote that while the album is "An admirable attempt at a sci-fi space-rock opera", the album "fails to blend the music with the theme, making for an almost unlistenable release". Outside of a single article from the Los Angeles Times, the album received little attention from the press of its time. "Cry Out (Marching Song of the Protestors)" was the only song from the album to be released as a single and the only one with a music video. Another music video was planned however, and it was planned to be the first music video ever shot in 3D, inspired off of an Elvira's Movie Macabre episode. However, the footage ended up being unusable, so the video was scrapped.

== Track listing ==
All music is composed by L. Ron Hubbard. Arranged and additional writing by Edgar Winter.

Side A
| No. | Title | Length |
|---|---|---|
| 1. | "Mission Earth" | 6:52 |
| 2. | "Treacherous Love" | 4:34 |
| 3. | "Bang-Bang" | 3:14 |
| 4. | "Teach Me" | 3:32 |

Side B
| No. | Title | Length |
|---|---|---|
| 5. | "Cry Out (Marching Song of the Protestors)" | 5:03 |
| 6. | "Just a Kid" | 3:54 |
| 7. | "The Spacer's Lot" | 4:46 |
| 8. | "Joy City" | 4:02 |

== Personnel ==
- Edgar Winter – soprano, alto, and tenor saxophones, sampler, keyboards, vocals
- Rick Cruzen – synthesizers, sound effects
- Ron Miscavige – trumpet, cornet
- Tamia Arbuckle – bass, guitar, sound effects
- Charlie Rush – sequencing, percussion, sound effects
- Barry Stein – Hammond B3 organ, accordion, vocals
- Pavel Farkas – first violin
- David Campbell – viola
- Bob Peterson – violin
- Vladimir Polimatidi – violin
- Bob Becker – viola
- John Walz – cello
- Peter Schless – programming, sequencing ("Planet Earth")
- Ali Darwich – Turkish tabla drums
- Kotto Gabal – Turkish tambourine
- Monique Winter – vocals ("Just a Kid")
- Margie Nelson – vocals ("Teach Me")
- Steve Ambrose – vocals ("The Spacer's Lot")
- Bo Tomlyn – programming

== See also ==
- Space Jazz, 1982 L. Ron Hubbard album companion to his novel Battlefield Earth
- The Road to Freedom, 1986 album by L. Ron Hubbard & Friends
- To the Stars, 2004 Chick Corea Elektric Band album based on Hubbard's 1954 novel
