= Summer Night: Live =

Live album by Chick Corea Akoustic Band
- Released: 1987 on vinyl record 1994 on compact disc
- Recorded: October 1, 1987
- Venue: Belgrade, Serbia
- Genre: Jazz; Latin jazz Jazz fusion
- Length: 73:48
- Label: Jazz Door

Chick Corea Akoustic Band chronology
Summer Night: Live (1987)	Akoustic Band (1989)

Summer Night: Live is a live jazz album by the Chick Corea Akoustic Band trio, featuring Chick Corea, John Patitucci and Dave Weckl. Recorded during a concert in Belgrade in 1987, it was released with Jazz Door, the former recorded and live jazz record label.

The set contained jazz standards from Miles Davis and John Coltrane, as well as several original quartets by Corea.

== Track listing ==
Side one
No.	Title	Writer(s)	Length
1.	"Bessies Blues"	John Coltrane	10:06
2.	"Summer Night"	Harry Warren/Al Dubin	10:16
3.	"Overjoyed"	Stevie Wonder	3:08
4.	"Round Midnight"	Thelonious Monk	10:08

Side two
No.	Title	Writer(s)	Length
1.	"Think of One"	Monk	7:58
2.	"Quartet 1"	Corea	11:43
3.	"Quartet 3"	Corea	13:02
4.	"Quartet 2"	Corea	6:33

== Personnel ==
- Chick Corea – Piano
- John Patitucci – Bass
- Dave Weckl – Drum kit
