= Rendezvous in New York =

Live album by Chick Corea
- Released: April 22, 2003
- Recorded: December 2001
- Venue: Blue Note Jazz Club, NYC
- Length: 125:15
- Label: Stretch
- Producer: Chick Corea, Herbert Waltl

Chick Corea chronology
Sea Breeze (2002)	Rendezvous in New York (2003)	To the Stars (2004)

Professional ratings
Review scores
Source	Rating
Allmusic	4.0/5 stars
The Guardian	4.0/5 stars
The Penguin Guide to Jazz Recordings	4/4 stars

Rendezvous in New York is an album by American pianist Chick Corea that was released on April 22, 2003 by Corea's label, Stretch Records. The recording took place at the Blue Note Jazz Club in New York City over the course of three weeks. Corea reunited with members from nine bands that he played with in the past. Musicians included Terence Blanchard, Gary Burton, Roy Haynes, Bobby McFerrin, Joshua Redman, Gonzalo Rubalcaba, and Miroslav Vitous.

== Track listing ==
=== Disc 1 ===
1. "Armando's Rhumba" (Chick Corea) – 4:58
  - Chick Corea – piano
  - Bobby McFerrin – vocals
2. "Blue Monk" (Thelonious Monk) – 5:34
  - Chick Corea – piano
  - Bobby McFerrin – vocals
3. "Concierto de Aranjuez/Spain" (Joaquín Rodrigo, Corea) – 8:14
  - Chick Corea – piano
  - Bobby McFerrin – vocals
4. "Matrix" (Corea) – 10:47
  - Chick Corea – piano
  - Roy Haynes – drums
  - Miroslav Vitous – bass
5. "Glass Enclosure/Tempus Fugit" (Bud Powell) – 16:10
  - Chick Corea – piano
  - Joshua Redman – tenor saxophone
  - Terence Blanchard – trumpet
  - Christian McBride – bass
  - Roy Haynes – drums
6. "Crystal Silence" (Corea, Neville Potter) – 10:01
  - Chick Corea – piano
  - Gary Burton – vibraphone
7. "Bessie's Blues" (John Coltrane) – 8:37
  - Chick Corea – piano
  - Dave Weckl – drums
  - John Patitucci – bass

=== Disc 2 ===
1. "Autumn Leaves" (Joseph Kosma, Johnny Mercer, Jacques Prévert) – 11:35
  - Chick Corea – piano
  - Dave Weckl – drums
  - John Patitucci – bass
2. "Armando's Tango" (Corea) – 12:10
  - Chick Corea – piano
  - Avishai Cohen – bass
  - Jeff Ballard – drums
  - Steve Wilson – alto saxophone
  - Steve Davis – trombone
  - Tim Garland – tenor saxophone
3. "Concierto de Aranjuez/Spain" (Rodrigo, Corea) – 13:25
  - Chick Corea – piano
  - Gonzalo Rubalcaba – piano
4. "Lifeline" (Corea) – 12:02
  - Chick Corea – piano
  - Avishai Cohen – bass
  - Jeff Ballard – drums
5. "Quartet No. 2, Pt. 1" (Corea) – 11:42
  - Chick Corea – piano
  - Michael Brecker – tenor saxophone
  - Eddie Gómez – bass
  - Steve Gadd – drums

== Personnel ==
- Chick Corea – piano
- Terence Blanchard – trumpet
- Steve Davis – trombone
- Steve Wilson – alto saxophone
- Michael Brecker – tenor saxophone
- Tim Garland – tenor saxophone
- Joshua Redman – tenor saxophone
- Gary Burton – vibraphone
- Gonzalo Rubalcaba – piano
- Christian McBride – bass
- Eddie Gómez – bass
- Avishai Cohen – bass
- John Patitucci – bass
- Miroslav Vitous – bass
- Jeff Ballard – drums
- Steve Gadd – drums
- Roy Haynes – drums
- Dave Weckl – drums
- Bobby McFerrin – vocals

== Chart performance ==
Year	Chart	Position
2003	Billboard Jazz Albums	17
