= Alive (Chick Corea album) =

Live album by Chick Corea Akoustic Band
- Released: February 1991
- Recorded: December 16, 1989
- Venue: Sunset Gower Studios, Stage 7, LA
- Genre: Post-bop
- Length: 63:48
- Label: GRP
- Producer: Chick Corea

Chick Corea chronology
Inside Out (1990)	Alive (1991)	Beneath the Mask (1991)

Professional ratings
Review scores
Source	Rating
AllMusic	3/5 stars
Entertainment Weekly	B+
The Penguin Guide to Jazz Recordings	3/4 stars

Alive is a live in the studio album by the Chick Corea Akoustic Band, recorded on Stage 7 in Sunset Gower Studios in Los Angeles in December 1989, and released in 1991 through the record label GRP. The album peaked at number three on Billboard's Top Jazz Albums chart. The trio of Corea, bassist John Patitucci and drummer Dave Weckl performed before an invited audience.

== Track listing ==
1. "On Green Dolphin Street" (Bronislaw Kaper, Ned Washington) – 9:14
2. "How Deep Is the Ocean?" (Irving Berlin) – 11:40
3. "Humpty Dumpty" (Chick Corea) – 8:51
4. "Sophisticated Lady" (Duke Ellington, Irving Mills, Mitchell Parish) – 6:59
5. "U.M.M.G. (Upper Manhattan Medical Group)" (Billy Strayhorn) – 5:29
6. "'Round Midnight" (Bernie Hanighen, Thelonious Monk, Cootie Williams) – 8:39
7. "Hackensack" (Thelonious Monk) – 2:41
8. "Morning Sprite" (Chick Corea) – 10:15

== Personnel ==
Musicians

- Chick Corea – piano
- John Patitucci – bass
- Dave Weckl – drums

Production

- Chick Corea – producer, engineer (mixing)
- Dave Grusin – executive producer
- Ron Moss – executive producer
- Larry Rosen – executive producer
- Bernie Kirsh – engineer (recording, mixing)
- Doug Sax – engineer (mastering)
- Robert Read – assistant engineer
- Evelyn Brechtlein – project coordination, management
- Joseph Doughney – post production
- Michael Landy – post production
- Michelle Lewis – production coordination
- David Gibb, Scott Johnson, Sonny Mediana, Andy Ruggirello, Dan Serrano – design
- Harrison Funk – photography

== Chart performance ==
Year	Chart	Position
1991	Billboard Top Jazz Albums	3
