= Light Years (Chick Corea album) =

Studio album by Chick Corea Elektric Band
- Released: 1987
- Studio: Mad Hatter Recording Studios (Los Angeles, CA)
- Genre: Jazz fusion
- Length: 60:25 (CD); 41:06 (vinyl)
- Label: GRP
- Producer: Chick Corea

Chick Corea chronology
The Chick Corea Elektric Band (1986)	Light Years (1987)	Eye of the Beholder (1988)

Light Years is an album by the Chick Corea Elektric Band. It features Chick Corea with guitarist Frank Gambale, saxophonist Eric Marienthal, bassist John Patitucci, and drummer Dave Weckl. The album received the 1988 Grammy Award for the Best R&B Instrumental Performance (orchestra, group or soloist).

== Release and reception ==
Professional ratings
Review scores
Source	Rating
AllMusic	4/5 stars
The Penguin Guide to Jazz	1/4 stars

The album was released by GRP Records. The first edition of The Penguin Guide to Jazz gave the album its worst possible rating, describing it and other Elektric Band releases as "deeply horrid". AllMusic's Scott Yanow concluded that it was "one of The Elektric Band's better releases".

== Track listing ==
All tracks written and arranged by Chick Corea, except where noted.

1. "Light Years" (Corea, John Patitucci, Dave Weckl)– 3:51
2. "Second Sight" – 4:12
3. "Flamingo" – 4:08
4. "Prism" – 3:29
5. "Time Track" – 5:02
6. "Starlight" (Corea, Patitucci) – 3:51
7. "Your Eyes" – 3:56
8. "The Dragon" (Corea, Patitucci) – 5:31
9. "View from the Outside" – 6:33
10. "Smokescreen" – 4:24
11. "Hymn of the Heart" – 6:40
12. "Kaleidoscope" – 8:03

Tracks 10–12 are bonus tracks on CD reissues.

== Chart performance ==
Year	Chart	Position
1987	Billboard Top Contemporary Jazz Albums	6

== Personnel ==
The Chick Corea Elektric Band

- Chick Corea – Synclavier, Yamaha TX816 (1, 3–9, 11, 12), Kurzweil synthesizer (1–5, 7–9, 11, 12), Oberheim Xpander (1, 9, 11, 12), MIDI piano (2, 3, 7), acoustic piano (3, 5, 6, 10, 11), Rhodes electric piano (4, 5, 8, 9, 12), Minimoog (12), LinnDrum (12)
- Frank Gambale – electric guitars (1, 5, 6, 9, 11, 12)
- John Patitucci – electric basses (1, 3–7, 9, 12), 6-string electric bass (2, 8, 9, 11), fretless bass (3, 11), double bass (8)
- Dave Weckl – Yamaha acoustic drums (1–9, 11, 12), Simmons drums, Yamaha PMC electronic drums (10)
- Eric Marienthal – alto saxophone (2, 5, 6, 8, 9)

Additional musicians

- Bob Rice – Synclavier programming
- Carlos Rios – electric guitars (3, 7)

=== Production ===
- Dave Grusin – executive producer
- Larry Rosen – executive producer
- Ron Moss – executive album producer, album cover concept
- Sue Thompson – executive album production assistant
- Chick Corea – producer, mixing, album cover concept, liner notes
- Dave Weckl – associate producer, mixing, drum production
- John Patitucci – associate producer (6), mixing
- Jay Oliver – mixing, drum production assistant
- Bernie Kirsch – engineer, mixing
- Ira Rubnitz – additional engineer, assistant engineer
- Larry Mah – assistant engineer
- Evelyn Brechtlein – studio manager
- Doug Sax – mastering at The Mastering Lab (Hollywood, California)
- Rory Kaplan – keyboard technician
- Shelly Miscavige – album title inspiration
- Hugh Symie – front cover photo illustration
- Glen Wexler – front cover photo illustration, album cover photography, album cover design
- Sandy Hesse – album photo coordinator
- Andy Baltimore – creative director, album cover design
- Dave Gibb – album graphics
- Dave Kunze – album graphics
- Dan Serrano – album graphics
- Cindy Thompson – marketing & publishing
- Musicians Services – management
