= Space Jazz =

Soundtrack album by L. Ron Hubbard
- Released: December 23, 1982
- Recorded: 1982
- Genre: Concept album
- Length: 44:20
- Label: Applause Records
- Producer: Golden Era Musicians

L. Ron Hubbard chronology
Space Jazz (1982)	The Road to Freedom (1986)

Battlefield Earth
- Album Cover from 1984 Re-Issue

Space Jazz: The soundtrack of the book Battlefield Earth is a music album and soundtrack companion to the novel Battlefield Earth by L. Ron Hubbard, released in 1982. Hubbard composed the music for the album.

== History ==
The album was recorded in Los Angeles in 1982 and released by Applause Records. A 1983 press release put out by the Church of Spiritual Technology subsidiary company Author Services Inc. marketed the concept album as "the only original sound track ever produced for a book before it becomes a movie". The album includes performances by prominent musicians Chick Corea (keyboards), Stanley Clarke (bass), Nicky Hopkins (keyboards) and Gayle Moran (keyboards/vocals). Hopkins was known for his work in rock and roll, the others mainly as jazz musicians; all were, at the time, associated with Scientology. The album features extensive use of the Fairlight CMI synthesizer. A demonstration of the "computer space jazz" soundtrack was one of the festival displays at the 1982 US Festival rock concert in California.

L. Ron Hubbard's son Ronald DeWolf filed a probate case in November 1982, after his father had not made any public appearances since 1980, requesting to be appointed trustee of Hubbard's estate on the grounds that his father was missing or dead. In 1983, attorneys representing Hubbard produced a letter in Hubbard's handwriting and with his fingerprints, in which he wrote that he had not had a leadership role in the Church of Scientology for "nearly 17 years", and mentioned his new novel Battlefield Earth, his recently released album Space Jazz, and 10-volume novel Mission Earth. "I am actively writing, having published Battlefield Earth, and my Space Jazz album; a projected ten-volume work, Mission Earth, is in the pre-publication stage at the moment", said Hubbard's statement. In conjunction with the release of Hubbard's letter, Church of Scientology President Heber Jentzsch told the press that Hubbard had produced Space Jazz around December 1982, and wrote the majority of songs and lyrics for the computer-based music on the album.

In 1984, the LP was retitled to Battlefield Earth. According to a 1987 statement from Norman F. Starkey, the executor of Hubbard's estate, the copyright to Hubbard's works passed to the Church of Scientology after his death. In addition to copyright of Space Jazz, other copyrighted music titles by Hubbard included "Tarzan", "The Black Cape" and "Snake Head".

== Reception ==
A 1983 review of the work for Stereo Review commented that the wording used in the jacket copy of the album was "hyperbolic". In a 2003 review for Locus Online, Jeff Berkwits noted: "The eclectic 1982 album is reportedly the first soundtrack ever written for a book, and highlights performances from jazz greats Chick Corea and Stanley Clarke". A copy of Space Jazz was given out to the first prize recipient in the 2006 Worst Record competition by the New Jersey newspaper the Hunterdon Democrat. The Vinyl Factory Amar reviewer Ediriwira said, "if this isn't one of jazz's worst, it's certainly its craziest".

== Track listing ==
Space Jazz

All music is composed by Rick Cruzen and Tamia Arbuckle, under the direction of L. Ron Hubbard.

Side 1
No.	Title	Length
1.	"Golden era of Sci Fi"	3:27
2.	"Funeral for a Planet"	3:35
3.	"March of the Psychlos"	3:14
4.	"Terl, The Security Director"	3:20
5.	"Jonnie"	3:38
6.	"Windsplitter"	3:11
7.	"The Mining Song"	3:12

Side 2
No.	Title	Length
1.	"The Drone"	3:06
2.	"Mankind Unites"	2:59
3.	"Alien Visitors Attack"	3:38
4.	"The Banker"	3:19
5.	"Declaration of Peace"	4:24
6.	"Earth, My Beautiful Home"	3:17

== Personnel ==
Artists

- L. Ron Hubbard
- Chick Corea
- Rick Cruzen
- Nicky Hopkins
- Stanley Clarke
- Tamia Arbuckle
- Fernando Gamboa
- Tomo Allison
- Charlie Rush
- Gayle Moran

Production personnel

- All arrangements and orchestrations by – Rick Cruzen and Tamia Arbuckle
- Under the direction of – L. Ron Hubbard
- Recorded and mixed at – Mad Hatter Recording Studios in Los Angeles
- Produced by – Golden Era Musicians
- Engineered by – Bernie Kirsk
- Technician – Gary Lew
- Assistant Engineer – Eric Westfall
- Mixed by – Rick Cruzen

== See also ==
- Mission Earth, 1989 Edgar Winter album based on Hubbard's novel series
- The Road to Freedom, 1986 record album by L. Ron Hubbard & Friends
- To the Stars, 2004 Chick Corea Elektric Band album based on Hubbard's 1954 novel
