= Eye of the Beholder (album) =

Studio album by Chick Corea Elektric Band
- Released: 1988
- Studio: Mad Hatter Studios (Los Angeles, California)
- Genre: Fusion, jazz fusion
- Length: 53:29 (CD); 43:07 (vinyl)
- Label: GRP
- Producer: Chick Corea

Chick Corea chronology
Light Years (1987)	Eye of the Beholder (1988)	Chick Corea Akoustic Band (1989)

Professional ratings
Review scores
Source	Rating
Allmusic	4.5/5 stars
The Penguin Guide to Jazz Recordings	2.5/4 stars

Eye of the Beholder is a 1988 album by the Chick Corea Elektric Band. It features Chick Corea with guitarist Frank Gambale, saxophonist Eric Marienthal, drummer Dave Weckl and bassist John Patitucci.

== Track listing ==
All tracks written by Chick Corea

1. "Home Universe" – 2:43
2. "Eternal Child" – 4:51
3. "Forgotten Past" – 2:58
4. "Passage" – 4:55
5. "Beauty" – 7:55
6. "Cascade - Part I" – 1:53
7. "Cascade - Part II" – 5:18
8. "Trance Dance" – 5:50
9. "Eye of the Beholder" – 6:38
10. "Ezinda" – 6:54
11. "Amnesia" – 3:26

Vinyl Version has only tracks 1–9 (GRP-A-91053)

== Personnel ==
The Chick Corea Elektric Band

- Chick Corea – acoustic piano, synthesizers, arrangements
- Frank Gambale – guitars
- John Patitucci – basses
- Dave Weckl – drums
- Eric Marienthal – saxophones

Additional musicians

- John Novello – additional synthesizers (2)

Production

- Ron Moss – executive album producer
- Dave Grusin – executive producer
- Larry Rosen – executive producer
- Chick Corea – producer, mixing, liner notes, cover concept
- Joe Hasse – recording manager
- Bernie Kirsh – engineer, mixing
- Duncan Aldrich – assistant engineer
- Mike Reese – mastering at The Mastering Lab (Hollywood, California)
- Larry Mah – technical maintenance
- Mike Thompson – keyboard technician
- Mark Francovich – studio manager
- Evelyn Brechtlein – production assistant
- Robert Schöller – cover painting
- Sally Hesse – album photo coordinator

== Chart performance ==
Year	Chart	Position
1988	Billboard Top Contemporary Jazz Albums	7
