= Synergy (Dave Weckl Band album) =

Studio album by Dave Weckl Band
- Released: May 18, 1999
- Recorded: January 18–31 and February 17–20, 1999
- Studios: Mad Hatter, Los Angeles, California
- Genre: Jazz fusion
- Length: 68:02
- Label: Stretch
- Producer: Dave Weckl

Synergy is a 1999 studio album by the jazz fusion group Dave Weckl Band.

The album peaked at No. 25 on the Billboard Top Contemporary Jazz Albums chart.

== Critical reception ==
Professional ratings
Review scores
| Source | Rating |
|---|---|
| AllMusic | 4/5 stars |
| The Sydney Morning Herald | 3/5 stars |

AllMusic wrote that "Weckl has a solid team to work with and emphasizes improvisation and honest-to-God playing not high-tech studio gloss."

== Track listing ==
1. "High Life" (Buzz Feiten, Tom Kennedy, Jay Oliver, Dave Weckl) – 7:46
2. "Panda's Dream" (Feiten) – 5:21
3. "Swunk" (Oliver, Weckl) – 4:49
4. "A Simple Prayer" (Feiten) – 4:53
5. "Cape Fear" (Feiten, Oliver, Brandon Fields) – 6:54
6. "Wet Skin" (Feiten, Fields, Oliver, Weckl) – 6:10
7. "Synergy" (Oliver, Weckl) – 7:13
8. "Where's My Paradise?" (Feiten, Oliver) – 4:52
9. "Lucky Seven" (Fields) – 5:55
10. "Swamp Thing" (Feiten, Kennedy, Oliver, Weckl) – 5:22
11. "Cultural Concurrence" (Weckl) – 3:24
12. "Tower '99" (Oliver, Weckl) – 6:06

== Personnel ==
- Dave Weckl – drums, percussion (4, 11), tambourine (9), hi-hat (9), brushes on box (11)
- Brandon Fields – tenor saxophone (1, 3, 5–7, 9, 10, 12), soprano saxophone (2, 4), Yamaha WX5 (5, 8, 9), baritone saxophone (9), additional keyboards (9)
- Jay Oliver – keyboards (1–8, 10, 12), synth solo (1), organ (9)
- Buzz Feiten – guitars (1–3, 5–7, 9, 10, 12), nylon guitar (4), steel string guitar (8)
- Tom Kennedy – bass (1–10, 12)

Production

- Chick Corea – executive producer
- Ron Moss – executive producer, management
- Dave Weckl – producer, mixing, photography, liner notes
- Jay Oliver – associate producer, mixing (3, 10, 12)
- Robert Read – recording, mixing (1, 2, 4–9, 11)
- Gavin Lurssen – mastering at The Mastering Lab (Hollywood, California)
- Evelyn Brechtlein – production manager
- Alexis Davis – production manager
- Jonathan Marshall – design, concept
- Curtis Parker – illustration
- Tyler Bender – photography
