= Battlefield Earth =

Battlefield Earth may refer to:

- Battlefield Earth (novel), a science fiction novel by L. Ron Hubbard
  - Battlefield Earth (soundtrack) (also called Space Jazz), companion music soundtrack to the novel, composed by L. Ron Hubbard
  - Battlefield Earth (film), a 2000 film adaptation of the novel, starring John Travolta
