= To the Stars (album) =

Studio album by Chick Corea Elektric Band
- Released: August 24, 2004
- Recorded: 2004
- Genre: Jazz fusion, post-bop
- Length: 68:16
- Label: Stretch
- Producer: Chick Corea

Chick Corea Elektric Band chronology
Rendezvous in New York (2003)	To the Stars (2004)	Live in Molde (2005)

To the Stars is an album by American jazz fusion group the Chick Corea Elektric Band, released on August 24, 2004, by Stretch Records. Jazz musician Chick Corea, a longtime member of the Church of Scientology, was inspired by Scientology founder L. Ron Hubbard's science fiction 1954 novel To the Stars. Hubbard's book tells the story of an interstellar crew which experiences the effects of time dilation due to traveling at near light speed. A few days experienced by the ship's crew could amount to hundreds of years for their friends and family back on Earth.

Corea was influenced in particular by a scene from Hubbard's work where one of the main characters plays the piano, and he created the album as a tone poem piece. It was the first time this line-up of his Chick Corea Elektric Band had gotten together since 1991. Scientology-owned Galaxy Press reissued the book at the same time as the album's release as a form of cross-marketing. Corea later produced another album, The Ultimate Adventure, also inspired by and named after a work by Hubbard.

The album received mostly positive reviews. Christopher Blagg of the Boston Herald commented: "Somewhere L. Ron Hubbard was smiling," and Mike Hobart of the Financial Times described the album as "a fine programme of jazz-fusion". It reached number eight on the U.S. Top Contemporary Jazz charts in September 2004, and garnered Corea a 2004 Grammy Award nomination for instrumental arrangement for the track "The Long Passage".

== Inspiration ==
Hubbard's To the Stars depicts a future where an interstellar ship travelling at near light speed slows down time experienced for its occupants. The ship's members are affected by Albert Einstein's time dilation theory, and the Earth experiences hundreds of years while only a few days have passed for members of the ship. The crew have no family or friends on Earth due to the time that separates them. Of the album's 17 tracks, 10 are directly based on characters or concepts from the book. The protagonist of the book (scientist Alan Corday), the ship's captain (Captain Jocelyn), and the ship's name (Hound of Heaven) are all titles of tracks on the album. The other seven tracks are "Port Views", short musical interludes between the larger pieces.

Corea explains at his website how he was motivated to work on music inspired by To the Stars, commenting that he was inspired by a scene from the book in which Hubbard describes the Captain of the spaceship in the story playing a melody on a piano. He had read the book eight or nine times, and after writing down musical composition based on Hubbard's work the album was created as a tone poem piece. Previous tone poem albums by Corea include The Leprechaun (1975), My Spanish Heart (1976), and The Mad Hatter (1978). The piece is Corea's first attempt at musical interpretation from one of Hubbard's works.

"The attraction to me was not only the challenge of writing music portraying characters in a fiction book but the fact that I've had such an intimate connection with L. Ron Hubbard and his work in Scientology for 40 years now. I've been a fan of his fiction for 25 years, and once I started into the act of working with his creations, it had an extra special excitement to me," he said in an interview with The Washington Post. "Aside from the content in his message, and the fact that he's the founder of the Church of Scientology and Dianetics, the thing I loved about Hubbard was the aesthetics of his writing. There is a musical wavelength to what he does," said Corea to The San Diego Union-Tribune.

== Production ==
Corea brought together the original members of Chick Corea Elektric Band for the first time since 1991, including bassist John Patitucci, drummer Dave Weckl, saxophonist Eric Marienthal and guitarist Frank Gambale. Gambale's electric guitar playing figures prominently in some of the tracks. In a statement in The Harvard Crimson, Corea commented that To the Stars represented a synergy of his three greatest passions: "My passion as a composer/performer, my passion for the Elektric Band as a perfect orchestra, and my passion for L. Ron Hubbard as the ideal artist." The album is his "favorite recording" out of his almost one hundred album discography.

Mike Manoogian designed the cover and book design for the 2004 hardcover edition of the novel To the Stars, and the artwork is copyrighted by the L. Ron Hubbard Library. The album cover uses the same design as the novel.

The novel To the Stars was reissued by Scientology-owned Galaxy Press at the same time as the album as a form of cross-marketing. According to Publishers Weekly, Corea's soundtrack to the novel was issued by Galaxy Press to give the company's "enormous marketing muscle" the ability to "tap into the vast Hubbard fan base".

Corea's 2004 piece "The Adventures of Hippocrates" was inspired by a robotlike character named "Hippocrates" from Hubbard's science fiction series Ole Doc Methuselah. Corea would go on to compose another album in 2006, The Ultimate Adventure, also inspired by and named after a book by Hubbard, which earned him two Grammy Awards.

== Reception ==
Professional ratings
Review scores
Source	Rating
Allmusic	3/5 stars
The Observer	3/5 stars
The Star-Ledger	3.5/5 stars
The Times	4/5 stars
All About Jazz	3.5/5 stars
The Penguin Guide to Jazz Recordings	3/4 stars

The album reached number eight on Billboard magazine's Top Contemporary Jazz charts in September 2004, and Corea earned a 2004 Grammy Award nomination for instrumental arrangement for the track "The Long Passage". The album received a rating of three stars from Allmusic, three stars from The Observer, three and a half stars from The Star-Ledger, and four stars from The Times. In a review of the work in The Washington Post, Geoffrey Himes writes that "Corea occasionally falls into his old bad habits of jazz-rock fusion excess, substituting frenetic virtuosity for melodic content and emotional connection on tunes such as the album-opening 'Check Blast' and 'Hound of Heaven.'" Himes highlights Corea's compositions of the seven "Port View" interludes, and calls "Alan Corday" the best piece on the album. Mike Joyce of The Washington Post also appreciated the "flamenco-tinged ballad" of the "Alan Corday" track. Christopher Blagg of the Boston Herald liked "the dense electrified samba of the joyous 'Mistress Luck – The Party'", and commented: "Somewhere L. Ron Hubbard was smiling." Bob Young of the Boston Herald described the album as "music that shifts continually from bright, aggressive jazz fusion to melodic tranquility and back again". James F. Collins gave the album a positive review in The Harvard Crimson, writing: "To The Stars is a testament to his [Corea's] unflagging creativity and is a proud addition to his already expansive discography." Mike Hobart reviewed the album for Financial Times, commenting that "once the band had delivered its first unison riff, the music's inspirational source was irrelevant as a fine programme of jazz-fusion poured out".

In his review of the album, Ben Ratliff of The New York Times writes: "I did like the driving, collective muscle of the band, though, very much," but he also describes its aesthetics as "cluttered and gaudy". For PopMatters, Associate Music Editor Justin Cober-Lake writes: "In many ways, it's a supreme accomplishment with difficult technique passages and broad soundscapes; on the other hand, it's a journey that's too long to take." In his review of Corea's later work The Ultimate Adventure, Will Friedwald of The New York Sun writes: "'To the Stars' was trite, electronic bubblegum music that sounded like a cheesy video-game soundtrack." Writing in The Times, John Bungey comments that "many of the pieces are straitjacketed into the cosmic concept", concluding his review with: "If you prefer hi-fi to sci-fi, then you will be hoping that Corea leaves the space helmet at home next time." John L. Walters gave the album a negative review in The Guardian, writing that the album "cries out for warning stickers – 'this album contains dangerously high levels of Scientology'", and that it "drags some perfectly fine jazz musicians ... through conceptual purgatory".

== Track listing ==
All music is composed by Chick Corea.

To the Stars
No.	Title	Length
1.	"Check Blast"	3:38
2.	"Port View 1"	0:54
3.	"Mistress Luck-A Portrait"	5:31
4.	"Mistress Luck-The Party"	3:23
5.	"Port View 2"	1:10
6.	"Johnny's Landing"	10:39
7.	"Port View 3"	2:30
8.	"Alan Corday"	7:08
9.	"Port View 4"	1:38
10.	"Hound of Heaven"	6:15
11.	"Port View 5"	1:14
12.	"The Long Passage"	10:46
13.	"Port View 6"	1:35
14.	"Jocelyn-The Commander"	5:01
15.	"Port View 7"	2:32
16.	"Captain Jocelyn-Tribute by His Crew"	2:02
17.	"Captain Jocelyn-The Pianist"	2:12

== Personnel ==
Band members

- Chick Corea – keyboards, record producer, liner notes
- Eric Marienthal – saxophone
- Frank Gambale – guitar
- John Patitucci – bass guitar
- Dave Weckl – drums

Guest musicians

- Pernell Saturnino – percussion
- Steve Wilson – saxophone

Technical personnel

- Bernard Alexander – piano tuner
- Brian Alexander – keyboard technician
- Joe Hesse – equipment manager
- Bernie Kirsh – engineer
- Bob Cetti – assistant engineer
- Rik Pekkonen – mixing
- Emanuele Ruffinengo – assistant producer
- Bernie Grundman – mastering

== Chart performance ==
Year	Chart	Position
2004	Billboard Jazz Albums	8

== See also ==
- Mission Earth
- The Road to Freedom
- Space Jazz
