= John Patitucci (album) =

Studio album by John Patitucci
- Released: 1987
- Genre: Jazz, jazz fusion
- Length: 59:49
- Label: GRP
- Producer: Chick Corea

John Patitucci chronology
John Patitucci (1987)	On the Corner (1989)

John Patitucci is the debut solo album of jazz bassist John Patitucci. The album reached No. 1 on the Billboard magazine Top Jazz Albums in 1987.

Professional ratings
Review scores
Source	Rating
AllMusic	3.5/5 stars

== Track listing ==
All tracks composed by John Patitucci except where noted.

1. "Growing" – 4:38
2. "Wind Sprint" – 6:10
3. "Searching, Finding" – 5:09
4. "Baja Bajo" (Chick Corea, John Patitucci) – 5:49
5. "Change of Season" – 3:57
6. "Our Family" – 3:05
7. "Peace and Quiet Time" – 5:02
8. "Crestline" – 5:17
9. "Zaragoza" (Corea) – 4:00
10. "Then & Now" – 5:44
11. "Killeen" – 5:21
12. "The View" – 5:37

== Personnel ==
- John Patitucci – bass
- Michael Brecker – saxophone
- Chick Corea – piano
- John Beasley – synthesizer
- Dave Whitham – synthesizer
- Dave Weckl – drums
- Vinnie Colaiuta – drums
- Peter Erskine – drums
