= Inside Out (Chick Corea album) =

Studio album by Chick Corea Elektric Band
- Released: 1990
- Studio: Mad Hatter Studios (Los Angeles, California).
- Genre: Jazz; Post-bop
- Length: 46:41
- Label: GRP
- Producer: Chick Corea

Chick Corea chronology
Chick Corea Akoustic Band (1989)	Inside Out (1990)	Alive (1991)

Professional ratings
Review scores
Source	Rating
AllMusic	4/5 stars
The Penguin Guide to Jazz Recordings	3/4 stars

Inside Out is an album by the Chick Corea Elektric Band, released in 1990 through the record label GRP. The album peaked at number six on Billboard's Top Contemporary Jazz Albums chart.

== Track listing ==
All tracks are written by Chick Corea.

No.	Title	Length
1.	"Inside Out"	5:10
2.	"Make a Wish, Pt. 1"	1:39
3.	"Make a Wish, Pt. 2"	6:17
4.	"Stretch It, Pt. 1"	0:51
5.	"Stretch It, Pt. 2"	7:51
6.	"Kicker"	6:18
7.	"Child's Play"	3:25
8.	"Tale of Daring (Chapter 1)"	2:02
9.	"Tale of Daring (Chapter 2)"	3:40
10.	"Tale of Daring (Chapter 3)"	5:48
11.	"Tale of Daring (Chapter 4)"	4:19

== Personnel ==
The Chick Corea Elektric Band

- Chick Corea – acoustic piano, synthesizers, arrangements
- Frank Gambale – guitars
- John Patitucci – basses
- Dave Weckl – drums
- Eric Marienthal – saxophones

Additional musicians

- Jay Oliver – synthesizer programming

Production

- Ron Moss – executive album producer, mixing
- Dave Grusin – executive producer
- Larry Rosen – executive producer
- Chick Corea – producer, mixing
- Danny Byrnes – recording manager
- Bernie Kirsh – recording, mixing
- Darren Mora – second engineer
- Robert Read – second engineer
- Larry Mah – assistant engineer, photography
- Mick Thompson – mixing, keyboard technician, Synclavier technician
- Brian Alexander – piano technician
- Doug Sax – mastering at The Mastering Lab (Hollywood, California)
- Evelyn Brechtlein – project coordinator
- Mark Wexler – cover title
- Barton Stabler – cover illustration
- Mike Manoogian – cover design
- David Gibb – graphic design
- Jacki McCarthy – graphic design
- Andy Ruggirello – graphic design
- Dan Serrano – graphic design
- Jeffrey Mayer – photography

== Chart performance ==
Year	Chart	Position
1990	Billboard Top Contemporary Jazz Albums	6
