= The Chick Corea Elektric Band (album) =

Studio album by Chick Corea
- Released: 1986
- Recorded: January 1986
- Studio: Mad Hatter Studios and Golden Era Studios (Los Angeles, California)
- Genre: Jazz, Jazz-fusion
- Length: 57:37 (CD); 42:41 (vinyl)
- Label: GRP Records
- Producer: Chick Corea

Chick Corea chronology
Trio Music Live in Europe (1986)	The Chick Corea Elektric Band (1986)	Light Years (1987)

Professional ratings
Review scores
Source	Rating
AllMusic	3/5 stars
The Penguin Guide to Jazz Recordings	2.5/4 stars

The Chick Corea Elektric Band is an album by jazz and fusion keyboard player Chick Corea, released in 1986. It is the debut album of the Chick Corea Elektric Band, which at that time also featured drummer Dave Weckl, bass player John Patitucci and guitarists Scott Henderson and Carlos Rios.

This album can be described as "jazz-rock", though it is much closer to traditional jazz than the jazz-rock albums of the 1970s. The keyboard sounds on the album are typical for the mid-1980s. The drums played by Dave Weckl dominate the album's sound, with the guitar duties split between Scott Henderson and Carlos Rios.

The album features a heavy use of FM synthesis, MIDI and drum programming, expanding on Corea's previous work in later lineups of Return to Forever and reflecting the technology of the time when it was conceived and recorded.

== Track listing ==
All songs by Chick Corea except where noted otherwise.

1. "City Gate" – 0:54
2. "Rumble" – 4:04
3. "Side Walk" (Chick Corea / Dave Weckl / John Patitucci) – 3:48
4. "Cool Weasel Boogie" – 6:43
5. "Got a Match?" – 5:38
6. "Elektric City" – 4:07
7. "No Zone" – 5:29
8. "King Cockroach" – 6:56
9. "India Town" – 5:06
10. "All Love" – 5:45
11. "Silver Temple" – 8:32

(Tracks #1, #10 & #11 were not included in the original issue of the album)

== Personnel ==
- Chick Corea – synthesizer programming, Fender Rhodes electric piano MIDI-ed to Yamaha TX816 rack-mount synthesizer units (1, 4, 6–8, 10, 11), Yamaha KX-88 MIDI keyboard/Yamaha TX816 rack-mount synthesizer units (1–3, 6–9, 11), Fairlight CMI (2, 3, 7), Synclavier (2–4, 7), Linn 9000 (2–4, 6, 7), Yamaha KX-5 keytar synthesizer controller/Yamaha TX816 rack-mount synthesizer units (5), Minimoog (6), Yamaha GS-1 (7), Yamaha DX7/Yamaha TX816 rack-mount synthesizer units (8, 9), gong (8, 9)
- Scott Henderson – guitars (1, 8, 11)
- Carlos Rios – guitars (3, 4, 6)
- John Patitucci – Smith/Jackson six-string bass guitar (1, 5, 8, 9, 11), Fender Jazz four-string bass guitar (6, 8), Pollman acoustic/double bass (4, 7, 10)
- Dave Weckl – drums, Simmons electronic drums (1–3, 6, 7, 9), LinnDrum (1, 3, 7–9, 11), percussion (2)

Additional musicians

- Rory Kaplan – synthesizer programming, Fairlight CMI programming
- Bo Tomlyn – DX voice creation
- Rhett Lawrence – LinnDrum consultant

== Production ==
- Ron Moss – executive album producer
- Dave Grusin – executive producer
- Larry Rosen – executive producer
- Chick Corea – producer
- Bernie Kirsh – associate producer, recording, mixing
- Joe Hesse – recording manager
- Larry Mah – assistant engineer
- Ira Rubnitz – assistant engineer, mix assistant, overdubbing
- Gary Wagner – assistant engineer
- Bernie Grundman – mastering at Bernie Grundman Mastering (Hollywood, California)
- John Rusko – technician maintenance
- Rory Kaplan – keyboard technician
- Evelyn Brechtlein – project coordinator, studio manager
- Julie Moss – project coordination assistant
- Marc Meisenheimer – production manager
- Mike Manoogian – cover logo
- Andy Baltimore – creative director, art design
- David Gibb – art design
- Dan Serrano – art design
- John David Moore – black and white photography
- Glen Wexler – color photography

== Chart performance ==
Year	Chart	Position
1986	Billboard Top Jazz Albums	6
