= Battleground Earth (disambiguation) =

Battleground Earth may refer to:

- Battleground Earth, a television series.
- "Battleground Earth" (Lois & Clark episode), an episode of the Lois & Clark Superman television series.
- Battleground: Earth, a preliminary title for the television series Earth: Final Conflict

== See also ==
- Battlefield Earth (disambiguation)
