= Unlight Domain =

Black metal band from Matanzas, Cuba

- Origin: Cuba
- Genres: Technical Black Metal; Black Metal
- Years active: 2005–present
- Label: Independent
- Members: Iván Leonard García; José Blanco; Camilo Vera; Yasell Gómez
- Past members: Liuber Sobrino; Joradany Pérez; Andry Hernández
- Website: www.unlightdomain.com

Unlight Domain is a black metal band from Matanzas, Cuba founded on June 6, 2005. This band is known for its fast, technical and intense black metal, with complicated arrangements. This band also pays great attention to the lyrics. The group has two demos cds and two full cds.

The first demo was released in July 2005 under the band's name with six songs. The second demo, Shadows, Blood and the Unholyone, was released in August 2007 with six tracks. Descensus Averni is the first cd released in November 2008 with nine tracks. In January 2013, their second album, Ruins of Creation, is released containing eleven tracks and their first DVD Alive in Ruins.

== History ==
=== The Beginning ===
In 2005, in the city of Matanzas, Unlight Domain is founded based on the idea of Iván Leonard, guitar and director, and Jordany Pérez, who was playing the drums in Puertas Negras. Later José Blanco joins in as vocal and a few weeks later Liuber Sobrino, who was playing bass in Amenthis, comes on board with the bass guitar.

The band had no name when the first two songs, In the Name of Satan and Dark Battle, are recorded. In a meeting between José Blanco and Aramis Laurencio, who later would be the band's manager and lyric writer, two names came forward. Aramis proposed Unlight while José liked Domain. In the end they decided to join the two words and Unlight Domain was born.

=== First Recordings ===
In July 2005, the band records four more songs. These new tracks, together with the other two, gave shape to Unlight Domain, the first band's demo CD. In this first work the music is more straightforward and linear. The external musical influences were heavy on the band's work. The band members didn't like the production on this demo where all the music was composed by Iván Leonard and the lyrics were written by Aramis Laurencio, José Blanco and Iván.

In spite of the limitations this demo won a nomination as best demo metal in Cuerda Viva, a TV show that divulges metal and other alternative musical styles in Cuba. The band is also nominated as best novel band and most popular band.

Shadows, Blood and the Unholyone, the second demo CD, was finished in August 2007. The band puts influences aside and reaches a higher level on the arrangements. A personal black metal style begins to show in this work. The production is superior but doesn't reach the band expectations. All music is composed by Iván Leonard and all lyrics are written by Aramis Laurencio.

Shadows, Blood and the Unholyone is also nominated in Cuerda Viva as best demo metal.

The song From the Shadows is selected by the Cuban record company Bis Music for a compilation cd called Rock Vivo that includes some of the most important rock bands of the country.

=== Descensus Averni ===
Due to the production problems of the previous works Iván Leonard decides to create Supremacy Studio in his own house and from that moment on he is the producer of the band's albums.

Descensus Averni, the first full cd, is released in October 2008. The band evolution can be appreciated in every track, with complex arrangements, cold and deeper riffs. The title track is something of a curiosity. An instrumental that goes away from the black metal sound and gets closer to a heavy metal sound where the musical level reached by the band can be appreciated. This cd includes a new version of the song Waiting from the first demo. Again all music is composed by Iván Leonard. All lyrics are written by Aramis Laurencio.

This Album was nominated in Cuerda Viva, in Cubademo and in Cubadisco, the most important musical event in Cuba.

Two years later the song Inner Demons is re- recorded for the first official video clip of the band.

=== The first Split CD in the History of Metal in Cuba ===
By the end of 2008 American Line Production released a CD in Mexico. Is a Split CD that Unlight Domain shares with Ancestor, a black thrash Cuban band. This work includes the first Unlight Domain's demo CD. This is the first split CD in the history of metal in Cuba.

In this period of time Jordany Pérez decides to abandon the band. He plays with Unlight Domain for the last time in December 2008. Months later Andry Hernándes, ex Ancestor, took his place.

Two years later Liuber Sobrino got married and went to live to Spain. Camilo Vera took his place as bass player.

=== Ruins of Creation ===
On November 12, 2012, start the recording sessions of the second studio album, Ruins of Creation, in Unlight Domain's Supremacy Studio. The album was released in January 2013 together with the band first DVD Alive in Ruins.

Ruins of Creation is superior to all previous works in terms of the bands appreciation with their production. This album is technically superior to Descensus Averni. this album can be appreciated with Unlight Domain's personal style and sound.

This album is more than a compilation of several songs. It's almost a conceptual album. The first seven tracks go around the same theme: the auto destruction of man and the need to find new paths to avoid it. The last song, Beneath the Mask, is an outro that resumes that idea.

The riff of Summon, the album opening track, can be heard again in The Age of Man and some verses are repeated in several songs creating a solid union throughout the album.

The art work is also interesting. Following the sequence of the cover, the print on the cd, and the print on the DVD a symbol of a power that only deepens humanity's problems can be seen and how it disappears. On this album the musical composition is shared by Iván Leonard and Camilo Vera. Aramis Laurencio keeps writing all the lyrics.

In 2014, Andry moved to Brazil and in his place Yasell Gomez took charge of the drums.

=== Unended Freedom Tale ===
The band is working on a new album that will be called "Unended Freedom Tale", a conceptual idea about the history and reality of Cuba.

Unlight domain is one of the most active bands in Cuba. They have played in many metal festivals in the country, and are frequently offering concerts, thereby gathering a solid fan base.

== Members ==
=== Session musicians ===
- Emilio Martiní (Habana Ensemble)– guitar (2008) (Descensus Averni's track)

=== Live musicians ===
- Joel "Chaos" (Ancestor) – bass (2008)
- Randy de Armas (Combat Noise) – bass (2008)

== Awards ==
Award	Year	Category	Nominated Work	Note
Cuerda Viva	2006	Best Metal Demo of the Year	Unlight Domain	Nominated
Cuerda Viva	2006	Best Novel Band	Unlight Domain	Nominated
Cuerda Viva	2008	Best Metal Demo of the Year	Shadows, Blood and the Unholyone	Nominated
Cuerda Viva	2009	Best Metal Album of the Year	Descensus Averni	Nominated
Cuba Demo	2009	Best Rock/Metal Album of the Year	Descensus Averni	Nominated
Cuba Disco	2012	Best Rock/Metal Album of the Year	Descensus Averni	Nominated
Cuba Disco	2013	Best Metal Album of the Year	Ruins of Creation	Nominated
Cuerda Viva	2013	Best Rock/Metal Album of the Year	Ruins of Creation	Nominated

== Discography ==
=== Demos ===
==== Unlight Domain (2005) ====
1. Unlight Domain
2. Waiting
3. Supremacy
4. Requiem for the Earth
5. Dark Battle
6. In the Name of Satan

==== Shadows, Blood and the Unholyone (2007) ====
1. From the Shadows
2. Emperor Satan
3. Three Moons
4. Mordor's Dark Forces
5. Shadows, Blood and the Unholyone
6. The Arrival of an Unholy Era

=== Studio albums ===
==== Descensus Averni (2008) ====
1. Soulless
2. Carpe Noctem
3. Sacred Land
4. Antrum Doloriis
5. Rotten Old Tree
6. King of Revenge
7. Inner Demons
8. Descensus Averni
9. Waiting (2008 version)

==== Ruins of Creation (2013) ====
1. Summon
2. Pagan Lore
3. Dressed in Twilight
4. The Age of Man
5. Blacken
6. Twisted Map of Hell
7. Deus Ex
8. Masters of Frustration
9. Ritual of the Six
10. Rising Demise (Inner Demons II)
11. Beneath the Mask
