= The Hudson Project (album) =

Live album by John Abercrombie / Peter Erskine / Bob Mintzer / John Patitucci
- Released: 2000
- Recorded: October 17, 1998
- Venue: The Manhattan Center, New York City
- Genre: Jazz
- Label: Stretch Records
- Producer: Rob Walls, Paul Siegel

The Hudson Project is a live album by guitarist John Abercrombie, drummer Peter Erskine, saxophonist Bob Mintzer, and bassist John Patitucci, recorded at the Manhattan Center, New York City on October 17, 1998 and released in 2000 by the Stretch label. Each musician contributed two compositions to the recording. The performance came about when the D'Addario Company hired the four players to present a series of clinics and concerts, and the group adopted the name Hudson Project.

A video recording of the performance was issued on DVD in 2004 by Hudson Music with the title Live In New York City. The DVD also includes instructional commentary by the players.

== Reception ==
Professional ratings
Review scores
Source	Rating
AllMusic	3/5 stars
Penguin Guide to Jazz Recordings	3.5/4 stars

The authors of the Penguin Guide to Jazz Recordings wrote: "jazz from three masters... Abercrombie's two compositions are the most upbeat and buoyant on the set, bracketed by Bob Mintzer's 'Runferyerlife' and 'Modern Day Tuba'. John's 'Little Swing' shows how comfortably he remains in possession of a classic jazz guitar idiom, while his solos on 'Cats + Kittens' and 'The Well'... suggest once again how much wit and humour there is in his playing."

At Jazz Guitar Today, author and guitarist Joe Barth included the album in his list titled "Three Gems of John Abercrombie Easily Overlooked", calling it "my favorite Abercrombie album", and commenting: "No well-worn standards here. All songs were written by the four musicians and are great songs that one will want to listen to over and over again."

In a review for All About Jazz, Ed Kopp commented: "The sound is impeccable on this 48-track digital recording, and the music weaves many textures, reflecting the talent and experience of four exemplary jazzers. The music is loose but sophisticated, falling somewhere between free fusion and modern mainstream jazz. While the solos are sometimes longer than you’d hear at a typical club performance, the playing is highly accomplished... Despite the impromptu feel of the proceedings, all four musicians coordinate well together. Abercrombie’s free guitar work is a nice complement to Mintzer’s straight-ahead blowing, and Patitucci and Erskine show why they're regarded as two of the most accomplished players on their respective instruments."

In a separate review for All About Jazz, Jim Santella remarked: "this innovative quartet comes together with a wallop... The session is adventuresome, modern, and of high quality... Members of this quartet come from different backgrounds; yet, they share in what they do on stage with mutual appreciation. The result is an outstanding performance."

Writing for AllMusic, Alex Henderson wrote that the album "You won't hear any overdone standards during the set; all four musicians contribute their own compositions, most of which are quite cerebral and angular. Clearly, the Hudson Project isn't a group that's willing to go out of its way to be accessible..."

In a review of the DVD, John Kelman wrote: "the quartet demonstrates their musical breadth and why they are such in-demand players... they sound like they've been playing together for years... it is a testament to the sheer musicianship of the players that they can come together and, with intuition at the forefront, create music that breathes, swings and is elevated beyond the written page by their ability to interact in a completely organic way... The camerawork is outstanding, focusing on the individual players enough to satisfy those interested in seeing how they do what they do, while not neglecting to provide the feeling that this is, indeed, a band."

== Track listing ==
1. "Runferyerlife" (Mintzer) – 8:31
2. "Labor Day" (Patitucci) – 7:48
3. "Little Swing" (Abercrombie) – 7:39
4. "Cats + Kittens" (Erskine) – 7:54
5. "The Well" (Patitucci) – 7:34
6. "Bass Desires" (Erskine) – 12:21
7. "That's For Sure" (Abercrombie) – 6:19
8. "Modern Day Tuba" (Mintzer) – 9:25

Recorded live at The Manhattan Center, New York City on October 17, 1998.

== Personnel ==
- John Abercrombie – guitar
- Peter Erskine – drums
- Bob Mintzer – saxophone
- John Patitucci – bass
