= Beneath the Mask =

Studio album by Chick Corea
- Released: August 13, 1991
- Studio: Mad Hatter Studios (Los Angeles, California). Post-Production at The Review Room (New York City, New York).
- Genre: Jazz, Jazz fusion, Post-bop
- Length: 55:36
- Label: GRP
- Producer: Chick Corea

Chick Corea chronology
Alive (1991)	Beneath the Mask (1991)	Play (1992)

Professional ratings
Review scores
Source	Rating
AllMusic	3/5 stars
Entertainment Weekly	B
The Penguin Guide to Jazz Recordings	2.5/4 stars

Beneath the Mask is an album by Chick Corea Elektric Band, released in 1991 through the record label GRP. The album peaked at number two on Billboard's Top Contemporary Jazz Albums chart.

== Track listing ==
1. "Beneath the Mask" (Chick Corea, John Patitucci, Dave Weckl) – 3:31
2. "Little Things That Count" (John Patitucci, Dave Weckl) – 3:47
3. "One of Us Is Over 40" (Chick Corea, John Patitucci, Dave Weckl) – 4:55
4. "A Wave Goodbye" (Chick Corea, Dave Weckl) – 4:45
5. "Lifescape" (Chick Corea) – 5:10
6. "Jammin E. Cricket" (Chick Corea, John Patitucci, Dave Weckl) – 6:51
7. "Charged Particles" (Chick Corea) – 5:17
8. "Free Step" (Chick Corea) – 7:44
9. "99 Flavors" (Chick Corea) – 3:52
10. "Illusions" (Chick Corea, John Patitucci, Dave Weckl) – 9:44

== Personnel ==
The Chick Corea Elektric Band

- Chick Corea – keyboards
- Frank Gambale – guitars
- John Patitucci – basses
- Dave Weckl – drums
- Eric Marienthal – saxophones

Additional musicians

- Bob Rice – synthesizer programming
- Rory Kaplan – synth string bass

Production

- Ron Moss – executive album producer, cover concept, cover design, lettering
- Dave Grusin – executive producer
- Larry Rosen – executive producer
- Chick Corea – producer, mixing, cover concept
- John Patitucci – co-producer
- Dave Weckl – co-producer, mixing
- Danny Byrnes – recording manager
- Bernie Kirsh – recording, mixing
- Robert Read – assistant engineer
- Wally Traugott – mastering at Capitol Studios (Hollywood, California)
- Joseph Doughney – post-production engineer
- Michael Landy – post-production engineer
- Kim Barry – equipment technician
- Mick Thompson – keyboard and Synclavier technician
- Brian Alexander – Rhodes piano technician
- Mark Frankovich – studio manager
- Evelyn Brechtlein – project coordinator
- Michelle Lewis – production coordinator
- Andy Baltimore – creative director
- Mike Manoogian – cover design, graphic design, lettering
- David Gibb – graphic design
- Scott Johnson – graphic design
- Sonny Mediana – graphic design
- Andy Ruggirello – graphic design
- Dan Serrano – graphic design
- Barton Stabler – cover illustration
- Harrison Funk – photography

== Chart performance ==
Year	Chart	Position
1991	Billboard Top Contemporary Jazz Albums	2
