= The Invaders Plan =

1985 novel by L. Ron Hubbard

- Author: L. Ron Hubbard
- Genre: Science fiction
- Publisher: Bridge Publications
- Publication date: 1985
- Media type: Print

The Invaders Plan is a novel by L. Ron Hubbard published in 1985.

== Plot summary ==
The Invaders Plan is the first novel in the Mission Earth novel series.

== Reception ==
Dave Langford reviewed The Invaders Plan for White Dwarf #80, and stated that "Partly rugous and partly squamous, first of a ten-book sequence, it leers and squatters beneath the gibbous moon."

== Reviews ==
- Review by Fred Runk (1985) in Fantasy Review, November 1985
- Review by Tom Easton (1986) in Analog Science Fiction/Science Fact, April 1986
- Review by Don D'Ammassa (1986) in Science Fiction Chronicle, #80 May 1986
- Review by Ken Lake (1987) in Vector 138
