= Chick Corea Akoustic Band =

Studio album by Chick Corea Akoustic Band
- Released: 1989
- Recorded: 1989
- Studio: Clinton Recording Studios (New York, NY); Mad Hatter Studios (Los Angeles, CA)
- Genre: Post-bop, jazz fusion
- Length: 60:29
- Label: GRP Records
- Producer: Chick Corea

Chick Corea chronology
Eye of the Beholder (1988)	Chick Corea Akoustic Band (1989)	Inside Out (1990)

Professional ratings
Review scores
Source	Rating
AllMusic	1.5/5 stars
The Penguin Guide to Jazz Recordings	3/4 stars

Chick Corea Akoustic Band is the first album by the Chick Corea Akoustic Band, featuring Chick Corea with John Patitucci and Dave Weckl. The group was nominated and received the 1990 Grammy Award for Best Jazz Instrumental Performance, Group at the 32nd Annual Grammy Awards.

== Reception ==
AllMusic awarded the album with 1.5 stars and its review by Daniel Gioffre states: "After recording a string of fusion records in the late '80s with his Chick Corea Elektric Band, Chick Corea returned to acoustic jazz with this trio date. Enlisting Elektric Band sidemen John Patitucci and Dave Weckl, Corea swings through ten tracks with noticeably mixed results. The leader is as romantic as ever, playing with bravado even on ballads, flawlessly executing complicated ideas, reveling in drama and melodrama."

== Track listing ==
Side one
No.	Title	Writer(s)	Length
1.	"Bessie's Blues"	John Coltrane	4:57
2.	"My One and Only Love"	George Gershwin, Ira Gershwin, Robert Mellin, Guy Wood	4:47
3.	"So in Love"	Cole Porter	6:55
4.	"Sophisticated Lady"	Duke Ellington, Irving Mills, Mitchell Parish	5:07
5.	"Autumn Leaves"	Joseph Kosma, Johnny Mercer, Jacques Prévert	5:07

Side two
No.	Title	Writer(s)	Length
1.	"Someday My Prince Will Come"	Frank Churchill, Larry Morey	6:14
2.	"Morning Sprite"	Chick Corea	6:33
3.	"T.B.C. (Terminal Baggage Claim)"	Corea	5:15
4.	"Circles"	Corea	6:33
5.	"Spain"	Corea	5:52

== Personnel ==
Musicians

- Chick Corea – Yamaha CP3 concert grand piano
- John Patitucci – double bass
- Dave Weckl – drums

Production

- Ron Moss – executive album producer
- Dave Grusin – executive producer
- Larry Rosen – executive producer
- Chick Corea – producer, album cover concept
- Bernie Kirsh – engineer
- Joseph Martin – recording assistant
- Larry Mah – digital mix assistant
- Mick Thompson – recording manager
- Meg Darnell – studio manager
- Mark Francovich – studio manager
- The Mastering Lab (Hollywood, California) – mastering location
- Jeff Baker – piano tuning and regulation
- Evelyn Brechtlein – project coordinator
- Suzanne Sherman – production coordinator
- Andy Baltimore – creative director, album cover concept, graphic design
- Carol Weinberg – album cover concept, photography
- David Gibb – graphic design
- Dave Kunze – graphic design, back cover illustration
- Ivan Salgado – graphic design
- Dan Serrano – graphic design, back cover illustration

== Charts ==
Year	Chart	Position
1989	Billboard Top Jazz Albums	1

== Awards ==
Grammy Awards

Year	Winner	Category
1989	Chick Corea Akoustic Band	Best Jazz Instrumental Album
