= John Patitucci =

American jazz bassist and composer

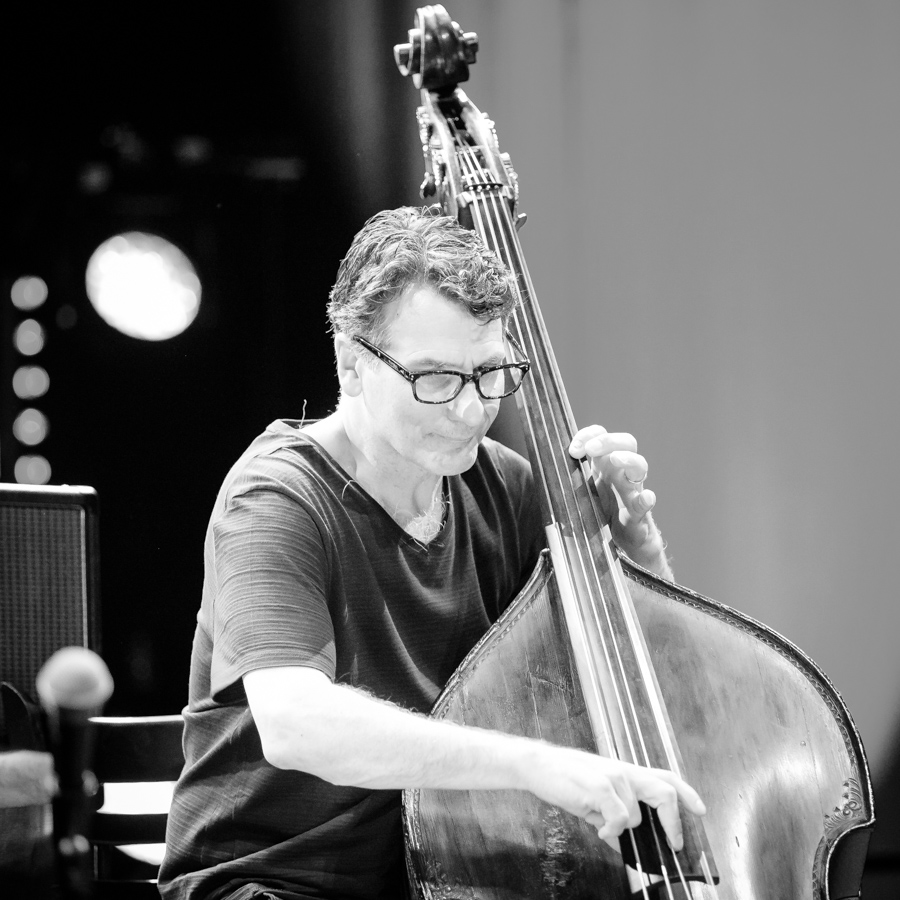
- John Patitucci at the 2018 Kongsberg Jazzfestival

Background information
- Born: John James Patitucci; December 22, 1959 (age 66); Brooklyn, New York, U.S.
- Genres: Jazz, jazz fusion
- Occupations: Musician, composer
- Instruments: Double bass, bass guitar
- Years active: 1980–present
- Labels: GRP, Stretch, Concord Jazz
- Website: johnpatitucci.com

John Patitucci (born December 22, 1959) is an American jazz bassist and composer.

== Biography ==
John James Patitucci was born in Brooklyn, New York. He began playing the electric bass at age 10, performing and composing at age 12, and at age 15, started playing the acoustic bass, as well as piano by age 16. He listened to bass parts in R&B songs on the radio and on his grandfather's jazz records. He cites as influences Oscar Peterson's albums with Ray Brown and Wes Montgomery's with Ron Carter. For the development of rhythm, he points to the time he has spent with Danilo Pérez, a pianist from Panama.

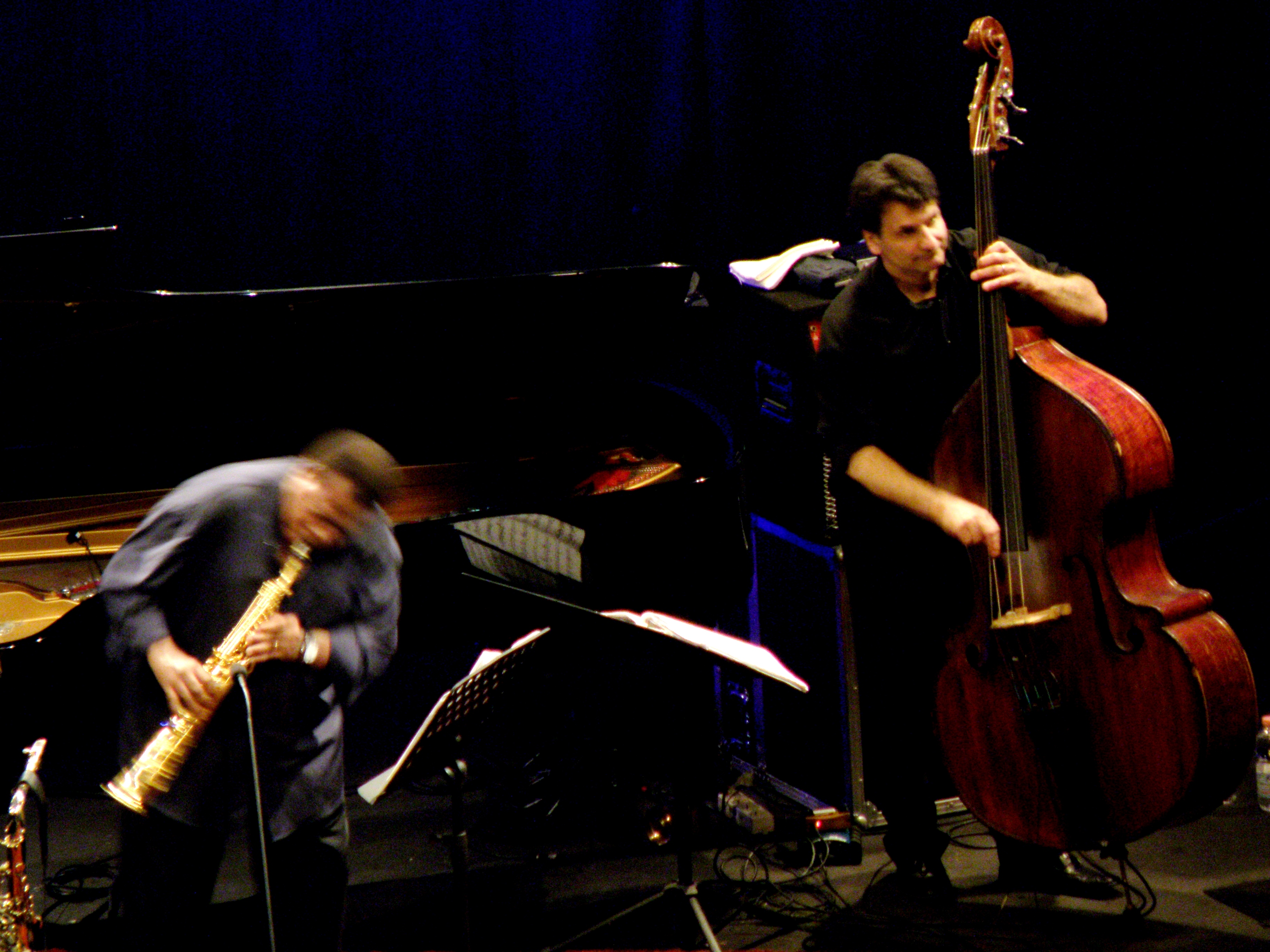
John Patitucci and Wayne Shorter with the Wayne Shorter Quartet at the Teatro degli Arcimboldi, Milan, Italy, 2010

In the late 1970s he studied acoustic bass at San Francisco State University and Long Beach State University. He began his professional career when he moved to Los Angeles in 1980 and made connections with Henry Mancini, Dave Grusin, and Tom Scott. From the mid-1980s to the mid-1990s he was a member of three Chick Corea groups: the Elektric Band, the Akoustic Band, and the quartet. As a leader he formed a trio with Joey Calderazzo and Peter Erskine, and a quartet with Vinnie Colaiuta, Steve Tavaglione, and John Beasley. He has played with Herbie Hancock, Wayne Shorter, and Roy Haynes. Patitucci switches between double bass and electric bass.

He was the artistic director of the Bass Collective, a school for bassists in New York City and is involved with the Herbie Hancock Institute of Jazz and the Betty Carter Jazz Ahead program. He was Professor of Jazz Studies at City College of New York. In June 2012 he started the Online Jazz Bass School. He was appointed artist in residence at Berklee College of Music.

== Back in Brooklyn ==
Back in Brooklyn is a documentary about Patitucci released by August Sky Films in 2015. Directed by Patrick Cone, the film includes footage from rehearsals, studio sessions, live performances, and interviews with Chick Corea, Wayne Shorter, and Herbie Hancock. The documentary was filmed during or around the time Patitucci's album Brooklyn was recorded.

== Awards and honors ==
- Most Valuable Player, National Academy of Recording Arts and Sciences, 1986
- Best Jazz Bassist, Guitar Player magazine Readers' Poll, 1992, 1994, 1995
- Best Jazz Bassist, Bass Player magazine Readers' Poll, 1993–1996
- Grammy Award nomination, Beyond the Sound Barrier as member of the Wayne Shorter Quartet, Best Jazz Instrumental Album, Individual or Group, 2005
- Lifetime Achievement award, Bass Player magazine, 2019
- Grammy Award nomination for his album Spirit Fall in the Best Jazz Instrumental Album category.

== Discography ==
=== As leader/co-leader ===
- John Patitucci (GRP, 1987)
- On the Corner (GRP, 1989)
- Sketchbook (GRP, 1990)
- Heart of the Bass (Stretch, 1992)
- Another World (GRP, 1993)
- Mistura Fina (GRP, 1995)
- One More Angel (Concord, 1997)
- Now (Concord, 1998)
- Imprint (Concord, 2000)
- Communion (Concord, 2001)
- Songs, Stories & Spirituals (Concord, 2003)
- Line by Line (Concord, 2006)
- Remembrance (Concord, 2009)
- Brooklyn (Three Faces, 2015)
- Soul of the Bass (Three Faces, 2019)
- Spirit Fall (Edition, 2025)

Collaborations

- All Strings Attached with Tal Farlow, John Abercrombie, Larry Carlton, Larry Coryell, John Scofield (Verve, 1987)
- Modern Days and Nights: Music of Cole Porter with Andy LaVerne, Bill Evans, Steve Davis (Double-Time, 1997) – rec. 1996
- Continental Talk with Randy Brecker, Steve Gadd, Stanislav Mitrovic, Ratko Zjaca (In+Out, 2009)
- Viva Hermeto! with André Marques, Brian Blade (Borandá, 2014)
- Children of the Light with Danilo Pérez, Brian Blade (Mack Avenue, 2015)
- TRIO with Vinnie Colaiuta, Bill Cunliffe (Le Coq, 2021)

=== As a member ===
Tamarack

- Tamarack (Parbar Music, 1981)

The Hudson Project
With Peter Erskine, John Abercrombie and Bob Mintzer

- The Hudson Project (Stretch, 2000) – live rec. 1998

The Great Jazz Trio
Led by Hank Jones with drummers

- 'S Wonderful with Jack DeJohnette (Eighty-eight's, 2004)
- Speak Low with Jack DeJohnette (Eighty-Eight's, 2005)
- Stella by Starlight with Omar Hakim and guest Sadao Watanabe (Eighty-Eight's, 2006)
- July 5 th - Live at Birdland NY with Omar Hakim (Eighty-Eight's, 2007)
- July 6 th - Live at Birdland NY with Omar Hakim (Eighty-Eight's, 2007)

=== As sideman or guest ===
With Karrin Allyson

- Ballads: Remembering John Coltrane (Concord Jazz, 2001) – recorded in 2000
- Many a New Day: Karrin Allyson Sings Rodgers & Hammerstein (Motéma, 2015)

With David Benoit

- Freedom at Midnight (GRP, 1987)
- Waiting for Spring (GRP, 1989)
- Letter to Evan (GRP, 1992)

With Cheryl Bentyne

- Something Cool (Columbia, 1992)
- Talk of the Town (Paddle Wheel, 2002)

With Gary Burton

- Departure (Concord Jazz, 1997)
- For Hamp, Red, Bags, and Cal (Concord Jazz, 2001)

With Chick Corea

- The Chick Corea Elektric Band (GRP, 1986)
- Light Years (GRP, 1987)
- Eye of the Beholder (GRP, 1988)
- Chick Corea Akoustic Band (GRP, 1989)
- Inside Out (GRP, 1990)
- Alive (GRP, 1991) – live
- Beneath the Mask (GRP, 1991)
- Time Warp (GRP, 1995)
- Live from Blue Note Tokyo (Stretch, 1996) – live recorded in 1992
- Rendezvous in New York (Stretch, 2003) – live
- To the Stars (Stretch, 2004)
- The Musician (Concord Jazz, 2017)[3CD] – live

With others

- The Manhattan Transfer, Vocalese (Atlantic, 1985) – 1 track
- Emiel van Egdom, This is for You (Optimism, 1988)
- Frank Gambale, Present for the Future (Legato, 1987)
- Martin Taylor, Sarabanda (Gaia, 1989) – recorded in 1987
- Everything but the Girl, The Language of Life (Atlantic, 1990) – recorded in 1989
- Roger Waters, Amused to Death (Columbia, 1992)
- Herbie Hancock, Possibilities (Hear Music, 2005)
- Pat Martino, Remember: A Tribute to Wes Montgomery (Blue Note, 2006) – recorded in 2005
- Alessandro Bertozzi, Crystals (C&C, 2014) – featuring Patitucci's bass on jazz fusion compositions blending funk and contemporary styles.
- Norah Jones, Day Breaks (Blue Note, 2016) – recorded in 2015
- Dan Costa (composer), Beams (Dan Costa, 2023)
- Chris Potter, Eagle's Point (Edition, 2024) – recorded in 2022

== See also ==
- List of jazz bassists
