= To the Stars (novel) =

1954 science fiction novel by L. Ron Hubbard

- First edition cover
- Author: L. Ron Hubbard
- Cover artist: Ed Valigursky
- Language: English
- Subject: Dystopian future
- Genre: Science fiction
- Publication date: 1954
- Publication place: United States
- Media type: Print (hardback & paperback)
- Pages: 157
- OCLC: 6620886
- Dewey Decimal: 813/.52 22
- LC Class: PS3515.U1417 T6 2004

To the Stars is a science fiction novel by American writer L. Ron Hubbard. The novel's story is set in a dystopian future, and chronicles the experiences of protagonist Alan Corday aboard a starship called the Hound of Heaven as he copes with the travails of time dilation from traveling at near light speed. Corday is kidnapped by the ship's captain and forced to become a member of their crew, and when he next returns to Earth his fiancée has aged and barely remembers him. He becomes accustomed to life aboard the ship, and when the captain dies Corday assumes command.

Hubbard's story was first published by John W. Campbell in two parts in a serialized format in 1950 in Astounding Science Fiction. It was first published in book format in 1954 under the title Return to Tomorrow, and was published in hardcover in 1975 under the same title. In 1997, film producers were in the process of developing the work as a movie for Touchstone Pictures. Jazz musician Chick Corea released a 2004 album of the same name with music inspired by the story, and Galaxy Press reissued a hardcover edition of Hubbard's novel the same year as a form of cross marketing.

The book was generally positively received, and garnered a 2001 nomination for a "Retro" Hugo Award for Best Novella. Publishers Weekly gave the book a positive review, calling it one of Hubbard's "finest works", and Alan Cheuse highlighted the work on National Public Radio's program All Things Considered as a top literature holiday pick.

== Plot ==
Protagonist Alan Corday is a young engineer, and is kidnapped from a spaceport called "New Chicago" and taken aboard the interstellar trading starship Hound of Heaven. The ship is commanded by a charismatic leader named Captain Jocelyn, who tells Corday to use his skills to help the Hound of Heaven in its travels between Earth and space colonies in other star systems. On the first page of the book's prologue Hubbard cites "the basic equation of mass and time.... AS MASS APPROACHES INFINITY, TIME APPROACHES ZERO", meaning that interstellar travelers at near light speed experience time relative to their environment, and when they return to their home star will find that decades or centuries may have passed. Six weeks of time aboard the ship amounts to roughly nine years experienced by those on Earth. Corday resists mingling with the culture aboard the starship, but when he returns home after travels with the Hound of Heaven he finds that his fiancée has aged and has trouble with her memory. Corday realizes his only home has become that of the starship. Captain Jocelyn is killed in an ambush on a dystopian Earth, and Corday takes command of the ship.

== Publication history ==
First publication in Astounding Science Fiction

To the Stars was first published in two parts in February and March 1950 in a serialized format by John W. Campbell in Astounding Science Fiction. Hubbard had previously written the story Ole Doc Methuselah for Astounding Science Fiction in 1947, later published as a book in 1992. In 1954 the story was published in book format by Ace Books in a paperback first edition, under the title Return to Tomorrow. Garland Publishing released a hardcover edition of Return to Tomorrow in 1975.

In 1997 Hollywood producers were working on developing a film version of To the Stars. Producers Barbara Boyle and Michael Taylor were preparing to bring the book to the film screen for Touchstone Pictures, a division of Walt Disney Motion Pictures Group. Boyle and Taylor had previously worked with actor John Travolta on the film Phenomenon, and the project was planned to be part of Travolta's vision to make films out of L. Ron Hubbard's science fiction novels. Hubbard's novel Battlefield Earth was first on his list, and Travolta starred in and helped fund the film version of the book which was released in 2000. A film version of To the Stars had not yet begun production as of 2008.

The jazz musician Chick Corea released a CD of the same name with music inspired by the story in 2004, and Galaxy Press reissued a hardcover edition of Hubbard's novel the same year as a form of cross marketing. According to Publishers Weekly, Corea's soundtrack to the novel was issued by Galaxy Press to give the company's "enormous marketing muscle" the ability to "tap into the vast Hubbard fan base". Corea explains at his website how he was motivated to work on music inspired by the book. He comments that he was inspired by a scene from the book where Hubbard describes the Captain of the Hound of Heaven spaceship playing a melody on a piano.

== Reception ==
To the Stars was nominated by the World Science Fiction Society for a "Retro" Hugo Award for Best Novella in 2001, losing to The Man Who Sold the Moon by Robert A. Heinlein. The "To the Stars" science-fiction magazine was published by Bridge Publications.

The book generally received positive reception from literature critics. Publishers Weekly described it as "golden SF from the Golden Age", and The Harvard Crimson called it "one of the great classics" of the Golden Age of Science Fiction. A reviewer writing in Publishers Weekly commented: "Hubbard brilliantly evokes the vastness of space and the tragedy of those who would conquer it", and called the book "one of his [Hubbard's] finest works". Alan Cheuse reviewed the book in the San Francisco Chronicle, writing: "As in a number of groundbreaking -- or time-breaking, I suppose we ought to say -- works of science fiction, the science behind the story is more interesting than the fiction itself. Hubbard is a thinker who writes, rather than a writer who thinks, as most masters are." Cheuse highlighted the book among his 2004 literature holiday picks in a piece for National Public Radio's program All Things Considered: "Before he began founding new religions, Hubbard was one of the country's most prolific pulp science fiction writers, and this book is one of his best." In a review of the book for the website SF Site, Georges T. Dodds, columnist for WARP, newsletter/fanzine of the Montreal Science Fiction and Fantasy association writes, "besides being among the earliest hard science fiction works to consider time-dilation effects in long distance near-light-speed space travel, (To The Stars) is a pretty entertaining story."

Barnes & Noble's Explorations editor, Paul Goat Allen, put the book at number eight on his list of the top ten science fiction/fantasy novels for 2004, writing: "After more than half a century, 'To the Stars' is just as timely, just as awe-inspiring, just as profoundly moving as it was in 1950." Writing in the Marburg Journal of Religion, Marco Frenschkowski of the University of Mainz described the book as a "melancholy tale about interplanetary travel and the effects of time dilation". University of California, Irvine physics professor and science fiction author Gregory Benford wrote positively of the book in an article for the science fiction website "Crows Nest": "Writers had used Einstein's special relativity theory before in stories, but Hubbard brought to his novel the compressed story telling and pulp skills that had stood him in over a decade of professional writing."

Galaxy reviewer Groff Conklin described the 1954 edition as "a fast-paced and grim adventure . . . just short of absurdity, but interesting nevertheless." Anthony Boucher panned the novel, calling it "a surprisingly routine and plotless space opera."

In addition to Chick Corea's album, which is directly based on the novel, it was also referenced in the 1996 album Fantastic Planet by the band Failure, the cover art of which is based on the book cover of the first edition of Return to Tomorrow.
