= Mission Earth (novel series) =

1985-87 SF novel series by L. Ron Hubbard

- Cover of Mission Earth volume 1: The Invaders Plan by Gerry Grace
- The Invaders Plan, Black Genesis, The Enemy Within, An Alien Affair, Fortune of Fear, Death Quest, Voyage of Vengeance, Disaster, Villainy Victorious, The Doomed Planet
- Author: L. Ron Hubbard
- Country: United States
- Language: English
- Genre: Science fiction
- Publisher: Bridge Publications
- Published: 1985–1987
- Media type: Print

Mission Earth is a ten-volume science fiction novel series by L. Ron Hubbard. Hubbard died three months after the publication of volume 1, and other volumes were published posthumously.

The series's initial publisher, Bridge Publications, coined the word dekalogy, meaning "a series of ten books", to describe and promote the novel. Made up of about 1.2 million words, the epic is a "satirical science fiction focusing on a preemptive invasion of Earth by an advanced alien civilization known as the Voltar Confederacy".

Despite largely negative critical reception, each volume in the series topped numerous bestseller lists, though with allegations of the Church of Scientology buying copies in bulk. The second volume, Black Genesis, was nominated for the 1987 Hugo Award in the Best Novel category. It lost to Speaker for the Dead. It made the final ballot but finished behind "No Award".

== Plot ==
The Voltarians want to conquer the planet Earth (Blito-P3, according to Voltarian astrocharts) to use as a gas station for their planned invasion of the galactic center. The Voltarians come to the conclusion that the indigenous inhabitants of Earth will destroy the planet through pollution and possibly war, which would disrupt the future of their invasion timetable. Royal Combat Engineer Jettero Heller, a character of perfection, incorruptibility, and astonishing ability, is assigned to save Earth from the Earthlings. Reaching New York City, he investigates the problem, unaware that he is being tracked and that factions on Voltar want his mission to fail.

Unknown to Heller, Earth is also the base of a secret operation conducted by the diabolically evil Lombar Hisst, head of the Voltarian Coordinated Information Apparatus (CIA), who seeks to usurp the Voltarian throne. To gain control, Hisst has been importing illegal narcotic drugs from Earth to enslave the heads of government on Voltar. Hisst works to make Heller fail in his mission.

Hisst assigns a stooge named Soltan Gris to supervise the mission to Earth, in order to sabotage it. Gris imports twelve tons of pure gold (which has less value to Voltarians), which he tries to launder through a Swiss bank account and keep for himself. He then becomes a prisoner of two man-hating lesbians who end up marrying him, but not before various tortures are inflicted upon him. He has terrible money and girlfriend troubles, and he hires a hit man who eventually targets him.

Heller discovers a conspiracy headed by Delbert John Rockecenter, who keeps the population of Earth sedated with drugs and rock and roll music. Heller's attempts to break the demonic control of Earth by Rockecenter make him a target, and the corporation uses its most dangerous weapons to destroy him: psychiatry and psychology, and a mad, idealistic public relations genius by the name of J. Walter Madison, aka J. Warbler Madman. Madison initiates a wide-reaching public relations campaign to make Heller known to the world as the "Whiz Kid," but results in destroying Heller's reputation so that all of Heller's efforts to save the planet come to naught, as Madison's employer, Rockecenter, wanted. Heller's outstanding skills and abilities are reinforced by the arrival on Earth of his fiancée, the Countess Krak, and the alliance and friendship of the Mafia—specifically the Corleone family.

After a series of world-shattering events, which include the impact of an ice meteor on the Soviet Union, the world's entire oil supply being turned radioactive, and a black hole orbiting the Earth, Heller returns to Voltar to find that not only have Hisst's plans to enslave the government nearly succeeded, but Madison is starting a galactic civil war.

After the defeat of Hisst and Madison, a massive cover-up operation commences to wipe out the effects of PR, psychology, and psychiatry. All mention of these subjects is censored and the planet Earth is eradicated from all star charts and similar items. As far as the Voltarians are concerned, planet Earth no longer exists.

== Volumes ==
1. The Invaders Plan (October 1985, ISBN 1-59212-022-9), 559 pages
2. Black Genesis (March 1986, ISBN 1-59212-023-7), 431 pages
3. The Enemy Within (May 1986, ISBN 1-59212-024-5), 393 pages
4. An Alien Affair (August 1986, ISBN 1-59212-025-3), 329 pages
5. Fortune of Fear (October 1986, ISBN 1-59212-026-1), 329 pages
6. Death Quest (January 1987, ISBN 1-59212-027-X), 490 pages
7. Voyage of Vengeance (May 1987, ISBN 1-59212-028-8), 381 pages
8. Disaster (June 1987, ISBN 1-59212-029-6), 337 pages
9. Villainy Victorious (September 1987, ISBN 1-59212-030-X), 410 pages
10. The Doomed Planet (September 1987, ISBN 1-59212-031-8), 333 pages

Page counts are from hardcover editions, totaling 3,992 pages.

== Public reaction ==
=== Critical response ===
The Encyclopedia of Science Fiction describes the series "whose farcical overemphases fail to disguise an overblown tale that would have been more at home in the dawn of pulp magazines".

The New York Times review of the first volume, The Invaders Plan, describes it thus: "... a paralyzingly slow-moving adventure enlivened by interludes of kinky sex, sendups of effeminate homosexuals and a disregard of conventional grammar so global as to suggest a satire on the possibility of communication through language".

In L. Ron Hubbard and Scientology, a survey of Hubbard's literary career, Marco Frenschkowski of the Johannes Gutenberg University of Mainz described the Mission Earth series:

The satire is not humorous, but biting and harsh, which makes the novels not easy to read. Also Hubbard somehow had lost contact with developing narrative techniques: he writes exactly as he had done 40 years earlier. When read as entertainment Mission Earth is disappointing: it does not entertain. Many of the scenes (especially some sexual encounters) are incredibly grotesque, not in a pornographic sense, but they are violently aggressive about modern American ideals. The Mission Earth novels on the whole are a subversive, harsh, poignant attack on American society in the 1980s. As such they have so far received almost no attention, which perhaps they do deserve a bit more. They also have some quite interesting characters, especially when read with a deconstructionist approach. These 11 later novels by Hubbard are not Scientology literature, but have some topics in common, especially the very strong opposition against 20th-century psychology and psychiatry, which is seen as a major source of evil. All open allusions to Scientology are strictly avoided. They are not as successful in their use of suspense and humour as Hubbard's early tales, but have to say perhaps more about the complex personality of their author.

=== Censorship attempt ===
In 1991, the town of Dalton, Georgia attempted to remove the Mission Earth books from its public library, citing what was described as "repeated passages involving chronic masochism, child abuse, homosexuality, necromancy, bloody murder, and other things that are anti-social, perverted, and anti-everything". The attempt was unsuccessful, though this placed the Mission Earth series into the category of banned books that have been challenged in the United States.

== Bestseller designation ==
The Mission Earth books were a major sales success, particularly the earlier volumes in the series, with all individual volumes reaching the New York Times bestseller list. The extent to which this reflects actual popularity is questioned. A large number of booksellers, publishing executives, and former Scientologists state that, as with other Hubbard books, the Church of Scientology engaged in a massive book-buying campaign, similar to the campaign to promote Battlefield Earth, so as to deliberately inflate sales of the series in order to promote it as a best-selling work of literature.

In a two-year span, Hubbard logged 14 consecutive books on the New York Times list. Adam Clymer, a New York Times executive, said that while the books have been sold in sufficient numbers to justify their bestseller status, "we don't know to whom they were sold". He said the newspaper uncovered no instances in which vast quantities of books were being sold to single individuals.
