= Chick Corea Elektric Band =

Jazz fusion band

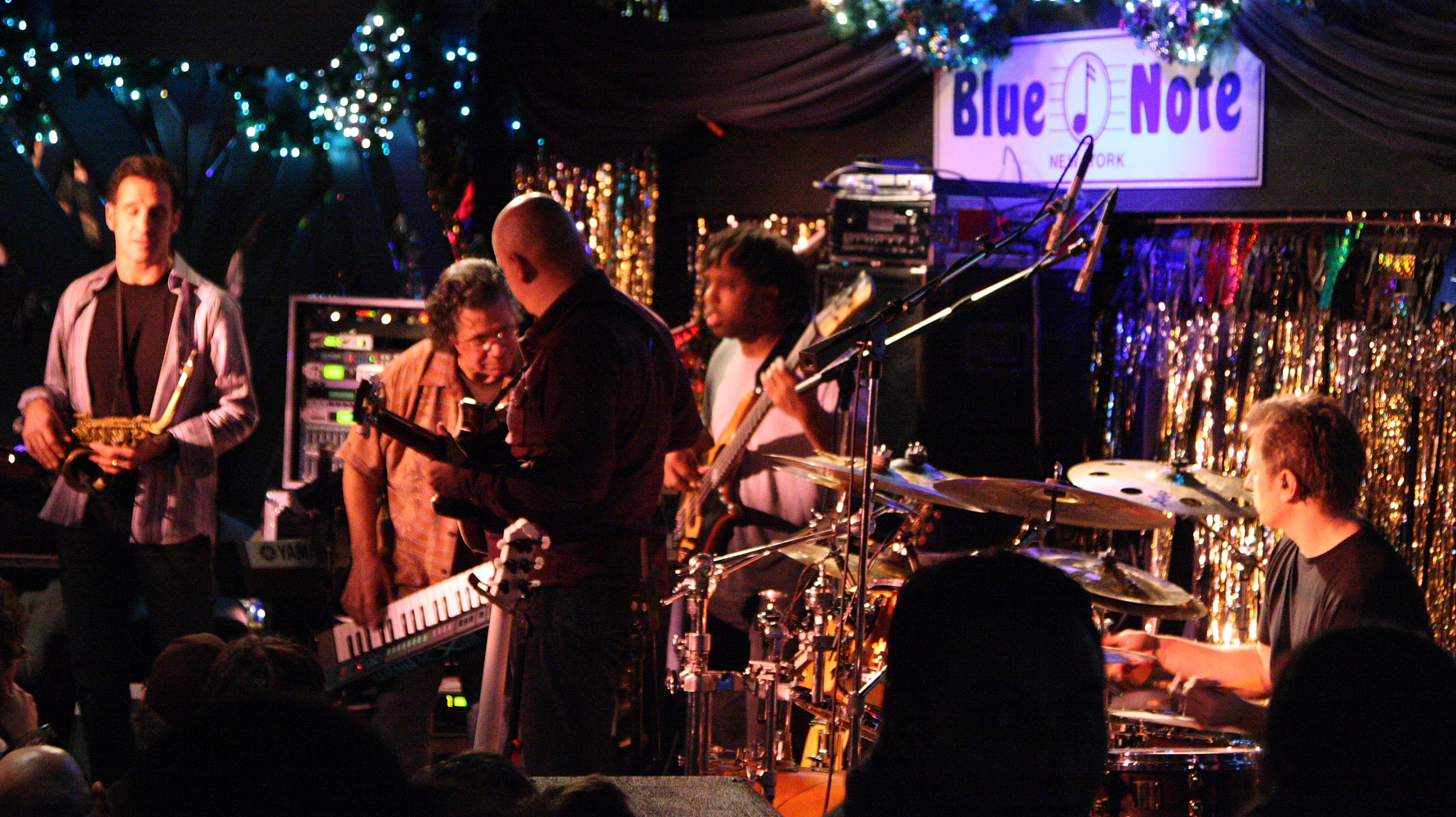
- At the Blue Note in New York City. Left to right: Eric Marienthal (saxophone), Chick Corea (keyboard), Frank Gambale (guitar), Victor Wooten (bass), Dave Weckl (drums)

Background information
- Genre: Jazz fusion
- Years active: 1986–2017
- Labels: Stretch, GRP
- Members: Chick Corea; John Patitucci; Frank Gambale; Dave Weckl; Eric Marienthal
- Past members: Scott Henderson; Carlos Rios; Gary Novak; Jimmy Earl; Mike Miller; Jamie Glaser; Mike Pope; Ric Fierabracci

Chick Corea Elektric Band was a jazz fusion band, led by keyboardist and pianist Chick Corea and founded in 1986 in New York City. The band was nominated twice at the Grammy Awards. The sixth band album,Chick Corea Elektric Band II - Paint the World and released in 1993, received an additional nomination the next year. The group reunited in 2003, and Corea died in 2021.

== History ==
=== Original lineup and first two albums ===
The band's first line up formed in 1985 and consisted of Dave Weckl (drums) and John Patitucci (bass) alongside Corea. The band recorded and released their eponymous first album in 1986 which included Carlos Rios and Scott Henderson on guitars.

The band’s typical line-up was cemented in 1987's Light Years, with Frank Gambale replacing Scott Henderson as a full time member, and saxophonist Eric Marienthal joining the group.

=== Third and fourth album ===
The third album was Eye of the Beholder, released in 1988. The material for the fourth album, Inside Out, was released in 1990. The last album featuring the band's traditional line-up was Beneath the Mask, released in 1991.

=== Fifth album and new lineup ===
For the next album, Elektric Band II: Paint the World released in 1993, only Corea and Marienthal returned from the original line-up. Gary Novak became the new drummer, Jimmy Earl took the bass, and Mike Miller played guitar. The album's style is jazz-oriented.

=== The tribute album and return of original lineup ===
In 1996, the band, together with Steve Vai's Monsters, recorded a version of "The Rumble" from West Side Story for the tribute album The Songs of West Side Story; this saw Weckl and Gambale returning. John Patitucci returned in 2004, restoring the band to its original lineup for To the Stars.

=== Last band tour and Corea's death ===
The band’s last tour took place in 2018.

Corea died of cancer at his home in the Tampa Bay area of Florida on February 9, 2021, at age 79; he had only recently been diagnosed.

== Discography ==
=== Studio albums ===
- The Chick Corea Elektric Band (1986)
- Light Years (1987)
- Eye of the Beholder (1988)
- Inside Out (1990)
- Beneath the Mask (1991)
- Elektric Band II: Paint the World (1993)
- To the Stars (2004)

=== Live albums ===
- Live from Elario's (The First Gig) (rec. 1985, rel. 1996)
- Live in Tokyo 1987 (rec. 1987, rel 2017).
- The Future Is Now (2023)
