= Stretch Records =

American record label

Stretch Records is an American record company and label that was established in 1997 by Chick Corea and music industry veteran Ron Moss. The label claims to promote "music with no boundaries", it has mostly released jazz music. Corea was the main artistic director of the label which is marketed and distributed by Concord Records. Stretch Records has released albums by such artistes as Bob Berg, Avishai Cohen, Eddie Gómez, John Patitucci, Bud Powell (Stretch Archives), Wallace Roney, and Dave Weckl, amongst others.

Corea and Moss initially launched the label in 1992 with John Patitucci's Heart of the Bass (distributed by MCA), although there was no significant output until Stretch joined with Concord in February 1997.
