= Battlefield Earth (novel) =

1982 novel by L. Ron Hubbard

- First edition
- Author: L. Ron Hubbard
- Language: English
- Genre: Science fiction
- Publisher: St. Martin's Press
- Publication date: 1982
- Publication place: United States
- Media type: Print (hard & paperback)
- Pages: 1050 (paperback)
- ISBN: 1-59212-007-5

Battlefield Earth: A Saga of the Year 3000 is a 1982 science fiction novel written by L. Ron Hubbard. Hubbard also composed an accompanying soundtrack to the book called Space Jazz. The book has often been considered in light of Hubbard's role as the founder of Scientology, though he denied that it bore any influence upon the novel. The Church of Scientology reportedly compelled members to buy multiple copies of the book to ensure that it would be a bestseller.

In 2000, the novel was adapted into a film starring John Travolta, which is widely considered one of the worst films ever made.

== Setting ==
In the year 3000 AD, the Psychlos, an alien race, have ruled Earth for a millennium. The Psychlos discovered a deep space probe (suggested to be Voyager 1) with directions and pictures mounted on it and the precious material, gold, which led them straight to Earth.

Psychlos stand up to 9 feet (2.7 m) tall and weigh up to 1,000 pounds (450 kg). They originate from Psychlo, a planet with an atmosphere radically different from Earth, located in another universe with a distinct set of physical laws characterized by a lack of elements that are radioactive. Their "breathe-gas" explodes on contact with even trace amounts of radioactive material, such as uranium. The Psychlos have been the dominant species across multiple universes for at least 100,000 years.

After one thousand years, humanity is an endangered species numbering fewer than 35,000 and reduced to tribes in isolated parts of the world while the Psychlos strip the planet of its mineral wealth.

== Plot ==
The novel follows Jonnie Goodboy Tyler, a young man in one such tribe who lives near the ruins of Denver in the shadow of the Rocky Mountains. Depressed by the recent death of his father as well as both the lethargy and sickness of the surviving adults in his tribe, he leaves his village to explore the lowlands and to disprove the superstition long held by his people of monsters in those areas.

On a brief excursion to the ruins of Denver, Terl, Psychlo chief of mine site security, encounters and captures Jonnie. After forcing Jonnie to learn the Psychlo language via a learning machine, Terl learns that the "home office" has extended his tour of duty on Earth. Maddened by the prospect of being stuck on a minor planet in an insignificant universe, Terl schemes to take a lode of gold in the Rockies for himself and escape. However, uranium deposits surround the lode, making mining by Psychlos impossible, forcing Terl to resort to using humans as forced labor. Terl captures Jonnie's girlfriend, Chrissy, and her little sister to use as leverage to force Jonnie to do as he is told.

Terl orders the Psychlo midget Ker to train Jonnie to use Psychlo machinery. Ker, markedly different both in height (7 feet (2.1 m) tall) and in temperament from other Psychlos, trains Jonnie as ordered, but the Psychlo and Jonnie also become friends. Terl and Jonnie travel to Scotland, where Jonnie recruits 83 Scottish people led by Robert the Fox to help with the mining. Using Terl's inability to understand English as a weapon, Jonnie tells Robert about Terl's evil deeds, and plots with the Scotsmen to take back the Earth.

While working to extract the gold from the lode, Jonnie learns how the Psychlos initially conquered Earth, mainly by sending a large armored gas drone into Earth's troposphere, bombing all major cities and killing billions. Humans fought back, launching attacks against the drone with first conventional and then nuclear weapons, but the drone was unharmed. Eventually, the last of the human leaders suffocated inside bunkers, the air vents sealed to prevent poison gas from entering.

Months later, Jonnie and the Scots disrupt the semi-annual teleportation of personnel and other goods to Psychlo, using their own technology against the Psychlos and gaining control of the planet. A year later, other alien races arrive and orbit the Earth. Threatened by these races, Jonnie simultaneously opposes a race of intergalactic bankers seeking to repossess the Earth for unpaid debts. The security and independence of humanity once again threatened, Jonnie eventually discovers that Psychlo was destroyed by Jonnie and the Scots after they sent manmade nuclear warheads to Psychlo alongside Terl, detonating the planets atmosphere and turning it into a highly radioactive star. Not knowing what had happened to their homeworld, every mine site on every Psychlo-owned planet was instantly destroyed when attempting to teleport materials to Psychlo.

Jonnie discovers that all Psychlos had inhibiter chips implanted in their brains by their rulers to control them, and force any Psychlo to become violent towards any species if they inquired about Psychlo math or technology. He figures out how to remove the chips without harming the Psychlos, which removes all excessive aggression.

Finally, Jonnie works out a way to prevent the repossession of Earth. With the help of an aged Psychlo mathematician, Jonnie learns about Psychlo math and how the Psychlos protected their technology. Jonnie also learns at this point that because Psychlo females were sterilized before being sent to Psychlo-owned planets the destruction of Planet Psychlo has effectively doomed the Psychlos to extinction. Jonnie makes a deal with the bankers to produce Psychlo teleportation pads in exchange for Earth's independence. As humans begin to rediscover their history, and with the Earth secure and the human population growing, a middle-aged Jonnie takes supplies and quietly slips away to the Rocky Mountains. He becomes a figure of legend.

== Scientology-related themes ==
After Hubbard's book Dianetics: The Modern Science of Mental Health was published in 1950, the American Psychological Association passed a resolution stating that the book's claims were not supported by empirical evidence. Subsequently, Hubbard maintained an opposition to psychiatry, a viewpoint the novel reflects by portraying the Psychlos as being ruled by the Catrists ("Psychlo-Catrists" sounding similar to psychiatrists), described as a group of evil charlatans. Those Psychlos who disagree with or oppose the Catrists are subjected to various forms of persecution; particularly, the Catrists use surgical mind control or electroshock in order to maintain their power base. Hubbard frequently claimed in Scientology that psychiatrists used such tactics to maintain their influence and funding. The word "Psychlo" is revealed to have originally meant "brain" in the Psychlo language, signifying that the Catrists feel (or in any case claim) that the entire population requires treatment as mental patients.

In one passage of the book, a human doctor recalls a "cult" called psychology which existed before the Psychlo invasion, but is "forgotten now".

In December 1980, two months after he completed the book, Hubbard told fellow Scientologists that "I was a bit disgusted with the way the psychologists and brain-surgeons mess people up, so I wrote a fiction story based in part on the consequences that could occur if the shrinks continued to do it".

== Publishing history ==
Initially titled "Man, the Endangered Species", Battlefield Earth was first published in 1982 by St. Martin's Press, though all subsequent reprints have been by Church of Scientology publishing companies Bridge Publications and Galaxy Press. Written in the style of the pulp fiction era (during which Hubbard began his writing career), the novel is a massive work (over 750 pages in hardcover, 1000+ in paperback). It was Hubbard's first science fiction novel since his pulp magazine days of the 1940s, and it was promoted as Hubbard's return to science fiction after a long hiatus.

The cover artwork of the original hardcover edition featured an image of hero Jonnie Goodboy Tyler which did not coincide with the physical description given in the novel. The subsequent paperback release corrected the cover art, most notably by giving Tyler a beard.

The book was reissued in 2000 with a new cover, in connection with the release of the film adaptation. The book has also been released in audiobook and e-book versions.

According to Nielsen BookScan, Battlefield Earth sold 29,000 copies between 2001 and 2005.

Hubbard is also credited with writing the accompanying music, which was released as Space Jazz; Chick Corea and Stanley Clarke are some of the Scientology notables playing on the album, of which The Vinyl Factory Amar reviewer Ediriwira said, "if this isn't one of jazz's worst, it's certainly its craziest".

== Reception ==
Battlefield Earth received polarized mixed reviews, with some critics and readers considering the book Hubbard's most enjoyable sci-fi work and a classic of the genre, while others considering it to be genuinely terrible. The book's critics assailed the quality of the writing and characters. The Economist called Battlefield Earth "an unsubtle saga, atrociously written, windy and out of control" while the science fiction magazine Analog criticized it as "a wish-fulfillment fantasy" with poorly fleshed-out characters. Punch sarcastically commended Hubbard's "excellent understanding of evil impulses" and avoidance of "frailties like love, generosity, compassion". David Langford, after criticizing the plot, style and scientific implausibilities, concluded: "From this, Battlefield may sound almost worth looking at for its sheer laughable badness. No. It's dreadful and tedious beyond endurance."

Other critics praised the novel, however. The Magazine of Fantasy & Science Fiction described the book as a "rather good, fast-paced, often fascinating SF adventure yarn." In a 2007 Fox News interview, then-governor of Massachusetts Mitt Romney called the book as "a very fun science fiction book." Neil Gaiman reviewed Battlefield Earth for Imagine magazine, praising it as "over 1000 pages of thrills, spills, vicious aliens, noble humans" and "a tribute to the days of pulp."

=== The Church of Scientology's role ===
Shortly after its release, Battlefield Earth rose to the top of The New York Times Best Seller list and also those of the Los Angeles Times, Time, United Press International, Associated Press, B. Dalton and Waldenbooks. According to Hubbard's literary agents, Author Services Inc., by June 1983 the book had sold 150,000 copies and earned $1.5 million.

Not long afterwards, stories emerged of a reported Church of Scientology book-buying campaign mounted to ensure that the book would appear on the bestseller lists. According to newspaper reports, Church representatives promised the publishers that a particular number of copies would be bought by Church subsidiaries (the author and journalist Russell Miller cites a figure of 50,000 hardback copies).

Local churches of Scientology and individual Scientologists were reportedly also urged to buy copies of the book. Bookstore chains including Waldenbooks cited examples of Scientologists repeatedly coming into stores and buying armfuls of the book at a time. Several bookstores reported that shipments of the book arrived with the store's own price tags already affixed to them, even before they were unpacked from the shipping boxes, suggesting that copies were being recycled. According to Miller, Scientologists throughout the United States were instructed to buy at least two or three copies each. Gerry Armstrong, who worked in the Church's archives at the time, states that "One of the wealthy Scientologists, by the name of Ellie Bolger, apparently paid a huge amount of money to the organization, which they then disbursed to staff members to go down to B. Dalton or whatever and buy the book". The New York Times reported that "two Scientology organizations bought a total of 30,000 copies of Battlefield Earth at discount directly from the publisher, apparently to sell or to give to current or prospective Scientology members". Booksellers told the newspaper that they had seen unusual purchasing patterns, including individuals buying as many as 800 copies of the book at a time. It was suggested that "church members could be trying to buy themselves a bestseller in order to obtain a large paperback or movie sale, both of which are often contingent on a book's first becoming a bestseller in hard cover." Two months after the reports emerged, Author Services Inc. announced that it had sold the film rights for Battlefield Earth to a Los Angeles production company, though it took another 16 years for the film to be made.

Former Scientologist Bent Corydon has described how pressure was put on the managers of Scientology "missions" – effectively franchises – to promote and purchase Battlefield Earth. At a conference held in San Francisco on October 17, 1982, Scientologist "mission holders" were told by Wendall Reynolds, the Church's international finance dictator, to do their bit to make the book a success:

And if you look at it Battlefield Earth has been released on the same pattern as the early 1950s, when LRH [L. Ron Hubbard] was a popular writer, with DMSMH [Dianetics: The Modern Science of Mental Health] released right on the heels of it and that put it right on the best-seller list! And right now, Battlefield Earth is selling out and selling out and selling out again. So we got a tremendous popularity thing going and you guys are getting a gift at 5 percent of CGI [Corrected Gross Income]. It's a total gift.

According to Corydon, "[W]e were ordered to sell 1,000 copies of Hubbard's recently released science-fiction book Battlefield Earth before Thursday or I would be kicked out as mission holder". The idea behind the publicity drive was said to be that it "would, in turn, get the Dianetics book selling"; Dianetics: The Modern Science of Mental Health did in fact experience a marked increase in sales subsequently, reentering The New York Times Best Seller list four times in 1986. Battlefield Earth, for its part, sold over 125,000 copies in its first print run and by March 1985 had sold 800,000 paperback copies.

Hubbard's role as the founder of Scientology has led to a long-running controversy about whether Battlefield Earth contains Scientology themes, and about the role that the Church of Scientology has played in publishing and promoting the book.

Hubbard himself denied that the book was a vehicle for Scientology. He described his motives for writing as being that "it keeps my hand in, amuses people and whiles away the otherwise idle hour. It's better than playing video games!" He addresses the question directly in the book's introduction, where he says: "Some of my readers may wonder that I did not include my own serious subjects in this book. It was with no thought of dismissal of them. It was just that I put on my professional writer's hat. I also did not want to give anybody the idea I was doing a press relations job for my other serious works."

== Film adaptation ==
The subsequent film adaptation, released in May 2000, was both a commercial failure and widely considered to be one of the worst films ever made. From the book's release, Scientologist and science-fiction fan John Travolta aimed to bring Hubbard's book to the big screen in a series of two films with himself playing Jonnie Goodboy Tyler, as well as producing. A first film was planned to be released in 1983, but due to rising costs, trouble in finding a studio that would fund the project, and Travolta's waning star power, the project was cancelled. It was finally distributed by Warner Bros. Pictures and produced by Franchise Pictures and released in 2000 as Battlefield Earth. Directed by Roger Christian, it stars Travolta (who by now felt he was too old to play the hero) as Terl, Barry Pepper as Jonnie Goodboy Tyler, and Forest Whitaker as Ker.

The film was heavily panned by critics and was a large box-office bomb. Due to bad word of mouth and Internet buzz, it quickly disappeared from theater chains, having grossed $29,725,663 worldwide against a reported $73 million budget. Almost all aspects of the film were criticized, including the acting, the overuse of Dutch angles, special effects, writing, pacing, lack of action, plot, dialogue and several plot inconsistencies. The film received seven Golden Raspberry Awards at the 21st such ceremony, including that for Worst Picture, and it later won two special awards: "Worst Drama of Our [the Razzies'] First 25 Years" and "Worst Picture of the Decade" (2000‒2009), at the 25th and 30th Golden Raspberry Awards respectively. Only Jack and Jill, a 2011 comedy co-written, produced by, and starring Adam Sandler, has won more Raspberries (jointly or solely winning all ten of the awards presented at the 32nd Razzies).

Franchise Pictures was later sued and went bankrupt after the company was discovered to have fraudulently overstated the film's budget. This kept it from following its plans to make a sequel, since the 2000 film covered only the first half of the book. The first Battlefield Earth's poor reception kept the sequel from hitting its intended 2002 release date, and the collapse of Franchise Pictures made the project even more untenable.
