= Dave Weckl =

American drummer (born 1960)

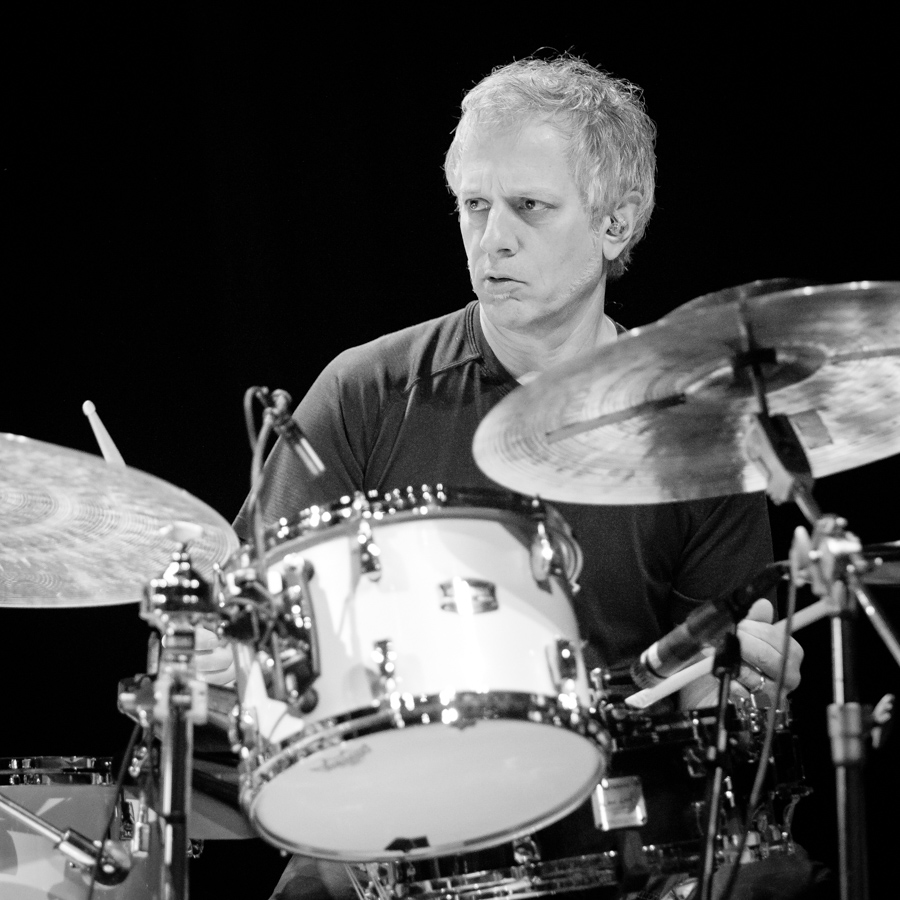
- Weckl performing in 2018

Background information
- Born: January 8, 1960 (age 66)
- Genres: Jazz fusion, post-bop
- Instruments: Drums, percussion
- Years active: 1981–present
- Labels: GRP, Stretch
- Website: daveweckl.com

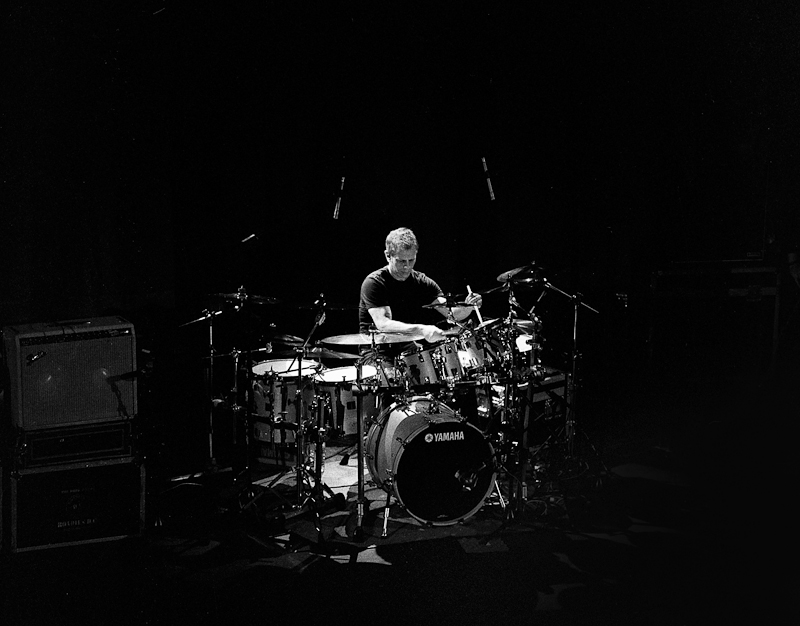
Dave Weckl live with the Mike Stern Band in 2009

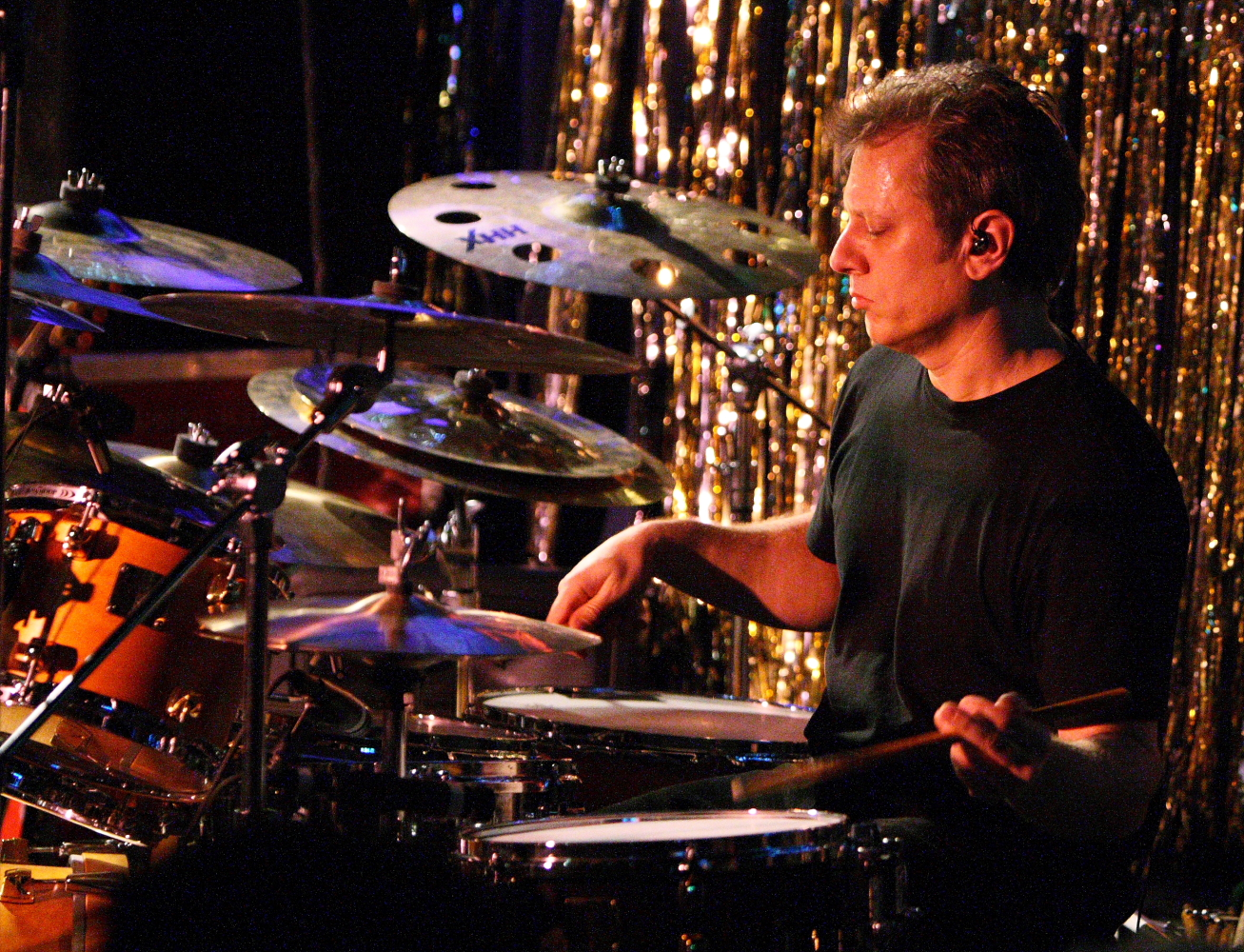
Playing with the Chick Corea Elektric Band at the Blue Note in New York in December 2007

Dave Weckl (born January 8, 1960, in St. Louis, Missouri) is an American jazz fusion drummer and the leader of the Dave Weckl Band. He was inducted into the Modern Drummer Hall of Fame in 2000.

== Biography ==
Weckl started playing his first set of drums at age 8 in his spare room along with records. He later played in the living room, sometimes with his father on piano. Weckl studied at the University of Bridgeport. Starting out on the New York fusion scene in the early 1980s, Weckl soon began working with artists such as Paul Simon, George Benson, Michel Camilo, Robert Plant, and Anthony Jackson.

He was with the Chick Corea Elektric Band from 1985 to 1991. During this time he performed on many albums and also appeared with Corea's Akoustic Band. He said he "augmented his work with Corea by continuing his session work and appearing often with the GRP All-Star Big Band". Weckl has released a series of instructional videotapes. His first recording as leader was in 1990 – Master Plan, for GRP. This was followed by Heads Up in 1992, and Hard-Wired in 1994. Later on, Weckl recorded and toured with guitarist Mike Stern.

== Discography ==
Dave Weckl:

- 1990 – Master Plan (GRP)
- 1992 – Heads Up (GRP)
- 1994 – Hard Wired (GRP)

Dave Weckl Band:

- 1998 – Rhythm of the Soul (Stretch)
- 1999 – Synergy (Stretch)
- 2000 – Transition (Stretch)
- 2001 – The Zone (Stretch)
- 2002 – Perpetual Motion (Stretch)
- 2003 – Live (And Very Plugged In) (Stretch)
- 2005 – Multiplicity (Stretch)
- 2019 - Live in St Louis at the Chesterfield Jazz Festival 2019 (Autumn Hill)

Dave Weckl and Jay Oliver:

- 2014 – Convergence

The Dave Weckl Acoustic Band:

- 2015 – Of the Same Mind
- 2016 - The Dave Weckl Acoustic Band - Live DVD

=== As sideman ===
With Bill Connors

- Step It (Pathfinder, 1984 [1985])

With Gerry Niewood

- Share My Dream (DMP, 1985)

With Mike Stern

- Upside Downside (1986)

With Chuck Loeb and Andy LaVerne

- Magic Fingers (DMP, 1989)

With Aziza Mustafa Zadeh

- Always (Columbia, 1993)

With Steve Khan

- Public Access (GRP, 1991)
- J.K. Special (Lipstick, 1993)

With the GRP All-Star Big Band

- GRP All-Star Big Band (GRP, 1992)
- Dave Grusin Presents GRP All-Star Big Band Live! (GRP, 1993)
- All Blues (GRP, 1995)

With Dave Grusin

- The Gershwin Collection (GRP 1991)
- Dave Grusin Presents West Side Story (GRP 1997)

With Nick Levinovsky

- Special Opinion (Butman Music, 2013)

With Chris Minh Doky

- CMD & The Nomads (Red Dot, 2014)

With School of the Arts featuring T Lavitz

- School of the Arts (Magnatude, 2007)

With Omar Faqir:

- 2018 – Pulse Album Now & Forever & Giant Sticks

== Videos ==
- 1988 – Back to Basics (DCI music)
- 1990 – The Next Step (DCI music)
- 1993 – Working It Out: Latin Percussion I - With Walfredo Reyes, Sr. (DCI music)
- 1993 – Working It Out: Latin Percussion II - With Walfredo Reyes, Sr. (DCI Music)
- 2000 – How to Develop Your Own Sound (Carl Fischer publishing)
- 2000 – How to Practice (Carl Fischer publishing)
- 2000 – How to Develop Technique (Carl Fischer publishing)
- 2015 - Flies on The Studio Wall / Convergence Behind The Scenes (DVD, Bluray)

== Books ==
- 1988 – Back to Basics
- 1992 – The Next Step (Manhattan Music)
- 1994 – Contemporary Drummer + One (Manhattan Music)
- 1997 – Ultimate Play-Along for Drums level I vol. I (Alfred Publishing Company)
- 1997 – Ultimate Play-Along for Drums level I vol. II (Alfred Publishing Company)
- 2001 – In Session with the Dave Weckl Band (Carl Fischer Music)
- 2004 – Exercises for Natural Playing (Carl Fischer Music)
