= Speak No Evil (Flora Purim album) =

Studio album by Flora Purim
- Released: 2003
- Genres: Jazz, Latin music
- Length: 50:23
- Label: Narada
- Producers: Gary Meek, Geoff Gillette, Yutaka Yokokura

Speak No Evil is a 2003 album by the Brazilian singer Flora Purim. The name of the album is a tribute to a 1966 album and song by Wayne Shorter.

The album is a fusion of jazz, samba, and other Latin rhythms, featuring Airto Moreira, Oscar Castro Neves, and her daughter, Diana Booker.

The album reached number fifteen on the jazz album chart at Billboard magazine.

== Reception ==
Professional ratings
Review scores
Source	Rating
AllMusic	2.5/5 stars

In a review for AllMusic, Jonathan Widran wrote: "Two realities are abundantly clear from listening to this... she swings magnificently with great jazz company... and she's far more emotionally effective singing in her native Portuguese than in her heavily accented English."

Christopher Loudon of JazzTimes stated that Purim and Moreira "hit a new high with Speak No Evil, arguably their most intriguing outing since their Return to Forever days of the early '70s."

Writing for The Washington Post, Mike Joyce acknowledged that Purim is "not in prime form" on the album, but noted that it "has its rewards," and praised the "colorful support from her bandmates."

In an article for All About Jazz, Javier AQ Ortiz called the album "a terrific work that provides a congenial listening experience, very well recorded and mixed, smartly arranged, and produced, with lots of good musical feelings."

Leila Cobo of Billboard commented: "in this collection... there's a steady and exquisite sense of style and good taste."

== Track listing ==
#	Title	Songwriters	Length
1.	"This Magic"	Don Grusin, Diana Booker	5:06
2.	"You Go to My Head"	Haven Gillespie, J. Fred Coots	3:54
3.	"Speak No Evil (All for One)"	Vanessa Rubin, Wayne Shorter	5:13
4.	"I've Got You Under My Skin"	Cole Porter	2:52
5.	"Tamanco No Samba"	Orlan Divo, Helton Menezes	5:05
6.	"Don't Say a Word"	Bill Cantos	6:28
7.	"Primeira Estrela"	Airto Moreira, Yutaka Yokokura	5:01
8.	"It Ain't Necessarily So"	Ira Gershwin, George Gershwin	5:22
9.	"I Feel You"	Bill Cantos	4:37
10.	"O Sonho (Moon Dreams)"	Egberto Gismonti	6:41

== Personnel ==
- Flora Purim – vocals
- Gary Meek – flute, alto saxophone, tenor saxophone, clarinet, bass clarinet
- Bill Cantos – keyboards ("Don't Say a Word" and "I Feel You")
- Oscar Castro-Neves – keyboards ("I've Got You Under My Skin") and acoustic guitar
- Russell Ferrante – keyboards ("This Magic" and "Speak No Evil")
- Christian Jacob – keyboards ("You Go to My Head" and "Ain't Necessarily So")
- Marcos Silva – keyboards (in "Tamanco no samba" and "O Sonho")
- Yutaka Yokokura – keyboards ("Primeira Estrela")
- Gary Brown – bass ("Tamanco No Samba", "Primeira Estrela" and "O Sonho"
- Jimmy Haslip – bass ("This Magic" and "Speak No Evil")
- Trey Henry – bass ("You Go to My Head", "Don't Say a Word", "Ain't Necessarily So" and "I Feel You")
- Jimmy Branly – drums ("This Magic") and percussion ("Speak No Evil")
- Airto Moreira – drums (except "This Magic"), percussion (except "Speak No Evil) and vocals (in "Primeira Estrela")
- Michito Sanchez – percussion ("This Magic" and "Speak No Evil")
- Diana Booker – vocals ("Primeira Estrela")

== Chart performance ==
Year	Chart	Position
2003	Billboard Top Jazz Albums	15
