= Butterfly Dreams =

Studio album by Flora Purim
- Released: 1973
- Recorded: December 1973
- Studio: Fantasy Studios (Berkeley, California)
- Genres: Latin jazz; jazz fusion
- Length: 36:45
- Label: Milestone
- Producer: Orrin Keepnews

Flora Purim chronology
Flora e MPM (1964)	Butterfly Dreams (1973)	500 Miles High (1974)

Butterfly Dreams is the second studio album by Brazilian jazz singer Flora Purim. It was released in 1973 via Milestone Records. Recording sessions took place at Fantasy Studios in Berkeley, California in December 1973.

== Reception ==
Professional ratings
Review scores
Source	Rating
AllMusic	4.5/5 stars
The Rolling Stone Jazz Record Guide	2/5 stars
All About Jazz	4.5/5 stars

In a review for AllMusic, Jim Newsom wrote: "Neatly capturing Flora Purim's many vocal strengths, Butterfly Dreams delivered on the great expectations generated by her work with Corea and turned out to be a high point in her recording career."

John Kelman of All About Jazz called the album "a diverse record that in its brief 37 minutes, affirms Purim's position as one of the most important musical voices to emerge from that era."

Writing for New Directions in Music, Marshall Bowden commented: "There is a freshness to [Purim's] voice here that is not always evident in later work... It doesn’t hurt that her collaborators here are among her most sympathetic... For those who enjoy light-sounding (as opposed to light on musical ideas) fusion tinged with Latin elements and airy, roomy vocalization, Butterfly Dreams is the perfect ticket."

== Track listing ==
No.	Title	Lyrics	Music	Length
1.	"Dr. Jive (Part I)"		Stanley Clarke	2:15
2.	"Butterfly Dreams"	Neville Potter	Stanley Clarke	6:59
3.	"Dindi"	Aloísio de Oliveira	Antônio Carlos Jobim	5:50
4.	"Summer Night"		Harry Warren; Al Dubin	6:23
5.	"Love Reborn"	Flora Purim	George Duke	3:40
6.	"Moon Dreams"	Jay Livingston; Ray Evans	Egberto Gismonti	4:59
7.	"Dr. Jive (Part II)"		Stanley Clarke	3:41
8.	"Light as a Feather"	Flora Purim	Stanley Clarke	5:44
Total length:				36:45

== Personnel ==
- Flora Purim – vocals, arrangement (track 3)
- George Duke – electric piano (tracks: 1–3, 5–8), ARP synthesizer (tracks: 1, 4, 6, 8), clavinet (tracks: 1, 7), piano (track 4), arrangement (track 5)
- David Amaro – electric guitar (tracks: 1, 3, 7, 8), acoustic guitar (tracks: 4–6)
- Stanley Clarke – Fender electric bass (tracks: 1, 3, 7), acoustic bass (tracks: 2, 4–6, 8), arrangement (tracks: 1, 2, 4, 6–8)
- Ernie Hood – zither (tracks: 4, 6–8)
- Joe Henderson – flute (tracks: 1, 8), tenor saxophone (tracks: 2, 4, 5, 8)
- Airto Moreira – drums, percussion

Technical

- Orrin Keepnews – producer
- Jim Stern – engineering
- Eddie Bill Harris – engineering
- David Turner – mastering
- Anthony Samuel Lane – art direction, design, photography
