= Buzz Feiten discography =

This article lists the discography of Buzz Feiten.

== As leader ==
- Buzz Feiten with special guest Brandon Fields (2008), Guitar, Vocals, Songwriter
- Buzz Feiten 'Whirlies' (2000), Guitars, Bass, Synth Bass, Mandolin, Bouzouki, Percussion, Background Vocals, Songwriter (on all tracks but one)
- Buzz Feiten & The Whirlies, 'Live at the Baked Potato, Hollywood, 6-4-99' (2002), Guitar, Vocals, Producer
- Buzz Feiten, 'Buzz Feiten & the new Full Moon' (2002), Guitars, Vocals, Percussion, Songwriter, Mixer, Producer
- Full Moon, 'Full Moon' (1972, re-released in 2000), Guitar, Percussion, Vocals, Vocals (background), Songwriter, Co-Producer (on 2000 Re-Release)
- Full Moon, 'Full Moon Live' (2002), Guitar, Vocal, Engineer, Producer, Songwriter

== As co-leader ==
- Larsen/Feiten Band, 'Larsen-Feiten Band' (1980), guitar, vocals, songwriter, horn co-arranger, co-songwriter
- Larsen/Feiten Band, 'Full Moon featuring Neil Larsen & Buzz Feiten' (1982), guitar, vocals, horn co-arranger.

== As band or group member ==
- DVD: 'Paul Butterfield Band' (videorecording of concert September 15, 1978, at the Grugahalle in Essen, Germany), Lead Guitar, Rhythm Guitar, Keyboard, Vocals. Includes an interview with the group, in which Buzz is credited by all with pulling the sidemen together for the concert. 'Rockpalast, the DVD Collection - Blues Rock Legends Vol 2', published by WestDeutsch Rundfunk, a division of SPV GmbH.
- The Paul Butterfield Blues Band, 'Keep on Moving' (1969), Guitar, Organ, French Horn, Background Vocals
- The Paul Butterfield Blues Band, 'An Anthology—The Elektra Years' (1997), Guitar, French Horn
- The Paul Butterfield Blues Band, 'Rockpalast: Blues Rock Legends, Vol. 2' (2010) (recording of Essen, Germany live concert September 15, 1978), Guitar
- Dave Weckl Band, 'Rhythm of the Soul' (1998), Guitar, Guitar (Rhythm)
- Dave Weckl Band, 'Synergy' (1999), Lead & Rhythm Electric Guitar, Nylon String Guitar, Songwriter on 'A Simple Prayer' & 'Panda's Dream', Co-Songwriter on 'High Life', 'Cape Fear', 'Wet Skin', and 'Where's My Paradise?'
- Dave Weckl, 'The Zone' (2001), Lead & Rhythm Guitar—includes DVD video

== As special event group member ==
- Various Artists, 'Casino Lights' [Recorded Live at Montreaux, Switzerland] (1982), Guitar, Co-Songwriter (with Neil Larsen) on 'Casino Lights' and 'E Minor Song'.
- Various Artists, 'Guitar Workshop in L.A.' (1988), Guitar, Co-Songwriter on 'Skunk Blues'.
- Free Creek, 'Music From Free Creek' (1973), also released as 'Summit Meeting' (1976), Guitar
- Lightnin' Rod, 'Hustlers Convention' (1973), Feiten/Larsen's Full Moon is the backing band for tracks 2, 3, 4, 5, and 8, Kool and the Gang for tracks 1, 7, and 9

== As regular featured guitarist or backup group member ==
- Felix Cavaliere, 'Destiny' (1975), Guitar, Electric Sitar, Horn Arranger on 'Love Came'
- Felix Cavaliere, 'Castles in the Air' (1979), Guitar
- Aretha Franklin, 'Spirit in the Dark' (1970), Guitar
- Aretha Franklin, 'Sweet Passion' (1977), Guitar
- Aretha Franklin, 'Love All the Hurt Away' (1981), Guitar
- Aretha Franklin, 'Legendary Queen of Soul' (1983), Guitar
- Aretha Franklin, 'Get It Right' (1983), Guitar
- Aretha Franklin, 'Never Grow Old' (1984), Guitar
- Aretha Franklin, 'Soul Survivor' (1986), Guitar
- Aretha Franklin, 'One Lord, One Faith, One Baptism' (1987), Guitar
- Rickie Lee Jones, 'Rickie Lee Jones' (1979), Guitar
- Rickie Lee Jones, 'Pirates' (1981), Guitar
- Rickie Lee Jones, 'Magazine' (1984), Guitar
- Rickie Lee Jones. 'Flying Cowboys' (1989), Guitar (Electric), Guitar (Classical)
- Rickie Lee Jones, 'Satellites' (CD single), 1989, Guitar (Classical)
- Rickie Lee Jones, 'Duchess Of Coolsville: An Anthology' (2005), Guitar
- Dave Koz, 'Dave Koz' (1990), Guitar
- Dave Koz, 'Lucky Man' (1993), Guitar
- Neil Larsen, 'Jungle Fever' (1978), Guitar
- Neil Larsen, 'High Gear' (1979), Guitar
- Neil Larsen, 'Through Any Window' (1987), Guitar
- Neil Larsen, 'Smooth Talk' (1989), Guitar
- Jeff Lorber, 'Private Passion' (1990), Guitar
- Jeff Lorber, 'Worth Waiting For' (1991), Guitar
- Jeff Lorber, 'Midnight' (1998), Guitar on 'Dear Prudence'
- Bette Midler, 'No Frills' (1983), Guitar
- Bette Midler, 'Experience the Divine' (Greatest Hits) (1995), Guitar
- Bette Midler, 'Bette of Roses' (1995), Guitar, Arranger, Guitar (Rhythm), Tambourine, Associate Producer
- Bette Midler, 'Experience the Divine' (1997), Guitar, Guitar (Rhythm), Associate Producer
- Randy Newman, 'Born Again' (1979), Guitar
- Randy Newman, 'Land of Dreams' (1989), Guitar
- Randy Newman, 'Guilty: 30 Years of Randy Newman' (1998), Guitar
- Olivia Newton-John, 'Live' (1983), Guitar. Video-Recording of a 1982 Utah concert which premiered on HBO.
- Art Porter, 'Pocket City' (1992), Guitar on 'Texas Hump' and 'Little People'
- Art Porter, 'Straight to the Point' (1993), Guitar
- Art Porter, 'Undercover' (1994), Guitar (Rhythm)
- Steve Postell, 'Time Still Knockin' (2011), Guitar
- The Rascals (formerly the Young Rascals), 'Peaceful World' (1971), Guitar, Bass, Vocals, Songwriter on 'Icy Water' and 'Love Letter'
- The Rascals (formerly the Young Rascals), 'Island of Real' (1972), Guitar, Arp, Vocal and Songwriter on 'Jungle Walk', Songwriter (credited as "H. Feiten") on 'Island of Real'
- The Rascals (formerly the Young Rascals), 'Anthology' (1965–1972) (1992), Guitar
- The Rascals (formerly the Young Rascals), 'The Complete Singles A's & B's' (Compilation, 2017), Guitar
- David Sanborn, 'Taking Off' (1975), Guitar, Guitar (Electric)
- David Sanborn, 'Voyeur' (1980), Guitar (Acoustic), Guitar, Guitar (Electric)
- David Sanborn, 'As We Speak' (1981), Guitar (Electric)
- David Sanborn, 'Backstreet' (1982), Guitar (Electric) on 'Backstreet'
- David Sanborn, 'The Best of David Sanborn' (1994), Electric Guitar, Acoustic Guitar
- David Sanborn, 'Original Album Series' (2010) (5-album box set—Taking Off (1975), Sanborn (1976), Heart To Heart (1978), Hideaway (1979), Voyeur (1980)), Guitar
- Tom Scott, 'Street Beat' (1979), Guitar
- Tom Scott, 'Desire' (1982), Guitar (Electric)
- Stevie Wonder, 'Music of My Mind' (1972), Guitar
- Stevie Wonder, 'Talking Book' (1972), Guitar

== As studio, featured, guest, or sideman musician ==
- Gregg Allman, 'Laid Back' (1973), Guitar, Guitar (Electric)
- George Benson, 'George Benson Collection' (1976), Guitar
- Michel Berger, 'Dreams in Stone', Guitar
- Stephen Bishop, 'Red Cab to Manhattan' (1980), Guitar
- Doug Cameron, 'Journey to You' (1991), Guitar
- Luis Cardenas, 'Animal Instinct', Guitar
- Chicago, 'Chicago 18' (1986), Guitar
- Phil Christian,'No Prisoner', Bass, Guitar
- Gene Clark, 'No Other' (1974), Guitar
- Commander Cody & The Lost Planet Airmen, 'Flying Dreams' (1978), Guitar
- Randy Crawford, 'Windsong' (1982), Guitar
- Randy Crawford, 'Best of Randy Crawford' (1996), Guitar
- Dino, '24/7' (1989), Guitar
- Bob Dylan, 'New Morning' (1970), Guitar, Guitar (Electric)
- Bob Dylan, 'Nashville Skyline/New Morning' (1997), Guitar (Electric)
- Kiki Ebsen, 'Red', Guitar
- Michael Franks, 'Blue Pacific' (1990), Guitar (Acoustic), Guitar
- Rosie Gaines, 'Closer Than Close' (1995), Guitar
- Jon Goodwin, 'How I Wasted My Life' (2000), Guitar (Electric)
- Stefan Grossman, 'Perspective' (1979), Guitar, Guitar (Electric)
- Hall & Oates (Daryl Hall and John Oates), 'Change of Season' (1990), Guitar
- Lani Hall, 'Double or Nothing' (1979), Guitar, Background Vocals, Songwriter on 'To Know' and 'Magic Garden'
- Stuart Hamm, 'Kings of Sleep' (1989), Guitar
- Stuart Hamm, 'Urge' (1991), Guitar, Vocals
- Fareed Haque, 'Sacred Addiction' (1993), Guitar (Acoustic), Guitar, Bass (Electric), Guitar (Electric)
- Janis Ian, 'Restless Eyes' (1981), Electric Guitar
- Janis Ian, 'Uncle Wonderful' (1983), Electric Guitar
- Toshiki Kadomatsu, 'Reasons for Thousand Lovers' (1989), Guitar. Cat. #M32D-1005 (Japan) also features Jeff Lorber, Steve Gadd
- John Keane, 'Straight Away' (1999), Guitar
- Bobby King & Terry Evans, 'Rhythm, Blues, Soul & Grooves' (1990), Guitar (w/ Ry Cooder also on guitar)
- Brian Krinek, 'Flying High' (1995), Guitar
- Labelle, 'Pressure Cookin' (1973), Guitar
- Patti Labelle, 'Something Silver' (1997), Guitar
- Kenny Loggins, 'Vox Humana' (1985), Guitar
- Kenny Loggins, 'Yesterday, Today, Tomorrow: The Greatest Hits of Kenny Loggins', (1997), Guitar
- Love, 'Reel to Real' (1974), Guitar
- Sara Lovell, 'Calling' (1998), Guitar
- Melissa Manchester, 'Emergency' (1983), Guitar
- The McCrarys, 'On the Other Side', Guitar
- Murray McLauchlan, 'Murray Mclauchlan', Guitar
- Don McLean, 'Don McLean' (1972), Guitar
- Don McLean, 'Playin' Favourites' (1974), Guitar
- Larry John McNally, 'Fade to Black', Guitar
- Larry John McNally, 'Larry John McNally', Guitar (Electric)
- Gary Meek, 'Gary Meek' (1991), Guitar
- Jason Miles, 'Mr. X' (1996), Guitar
- Alec Milstein, 'Dancing in the Rain' (2000), Guitar
- Adam Mitchell, 'Redhead in Trouble' (1979), Guitar (Electric)
- Patsy Moore, 'Regarding the Human Condition' (1992), Guitar (Acoustic), Guitar (Electric)
- Mr. Mister, 'Pull' (1990), Guitar
- Mr. Mister, 'The Best of Mr. Mister' (2001), Guitar
- Alannah Myles, 'Rockinghorse' (1992), Guitar
- Jerry Novac, 'Novac / The Fifth Word' (1970), Guitar, credited as "Buzzy Feitan"
- Claus Ogerman (with Michael Brecker), 'Cityscape' (1982), Guitar
- Stu Nunnery, 'Stu Nunnery' (1973), Bass, Guitar
- Michael Paulo, 'Fusebox' (1990), Guitar
- Bill Quateman, 'Just Like You' (1979), Guitar, Guitar (Electric), Guitar (Rhythm), Vocals (background). Also on guitar: Jeff Baxter.
- Brenda Russell, 'Love Life' (1981), Guitar
- Evie Sands, 'Suspended Animation' (1979), Guitar (Electric)
- Boz Scaggs, 'Other Roads' (1988), Guitar
- Ben Sidran, 'Cat and the Hat' (1977), 'Guitar'
- Edwin Starr, 'Stronger Than You Think I Am' (1980), Guitar
- Curtis Stigers, 'Curtis Stigers' (1991), Guitar
- Syreeta, 'Syreeta' (1972), Guitar
- Livingston Taylor, 'Over the Rainbow' (1973), Guitar
- Livingston Taylor, 'Carolina Day: The Collection' (1998), Guitar
- Tanya Tucker, 'Should I Do It' (1981), Guitar
- Dwight Twilley, 'Jungle' (1984), Guitar
- Jennifer Warnes, 'Shot through the Heart' (1979), Guitar
- David Waters, 'Island Refugee' (1995), Guitar
- Tim Weisberg, 'Best of Tim Weisberg: Smile!' (1979), Guitar
- Tim Weisberg, 'Party of One' (1980), Guitar
- Gary Wright, 'Headin' Home' (1979), Acoustic Guitar
- Jesse Colin Young, 'Perfect Stranger' (1982), Guitar

== In anthologies or samplers ==
- Various Artists, 'JVC World Class Sampler, Vol. 2' (1989), Guitar
- Various Artists, 'Rock of the 70's, Vol. 4' (1992), Guitar
- Various Artists, 'Best of Smooth Jazz, Vol. 3' (1998), Guitar
- Various Artists, 'Midnight Groove: Art of Smooth Jazz' (1998), Guitar
- Various Artists, 'The LA Cowboys: Endless Summer' (1993), Guitar on 'Something In My Heart' (credited as "Buzz 'Stoney' Feiten")

== In film, television, or video Soundtracks ==
- Michael Kamen, 'Hudson Hawk' (film), original score
- Film 'Footloose' [Original Soundtrack] (1984), Guitar
- Original TV Soundtrack, 'Melrose Place Jazz: Upstairs at MP' (1998), Guitar
