= Fourth World (album) =

Studio album by Fourth World
- Released: 1993
- Recorded: November 17 to December 18, 1992
- Venue: 145 Wardour Street; Red Bus Recording Studio
- Genre: Latin jazz; jazz fusion
- Length: 65:04
- Label: B&W Music
- Producer: David Garland, Mark St John

Fourth World chronology
Live at Ronnie Scott's (1992)	Fourth World (1993)	Encounters of the Fourth World (1995)

Fourth World is the debut album by the Brazilian jazz group Fourth World that was released on B&W Music in 1993.

== Track listing ==
No.	Title	Music	Length
1.	"Esperanza"	Airto Moreira, José Neto	4:52
2.	"River São Francisco"	Flora Purim	4:46
3.	"Starfish"	A. Moreira, Neto	11:01
4.	"Povo de Lira"	A. Moreira	2:51
5.	"Africa"	Neto, Purim, Diana Moreira	4:09
6.	"Earthquake"	Neto, Purim	6:57
7.	"Lua"	Neto, A. Moreira	7:50
8.	"Seven Steps"	Neto	8:29
9.	"Firewater Jive Talk"	A. Moreira, Hermeto Pascoal	5:42
10.	"Santa Anita" (featuring Chil Factor)	Hugo Fattoruso, Rubén Rada, Chil Factor	7:01

== Personnel ==
- Airto Moreira – drums, percussion, vocals
- Flora Purim – vocals, percussion
- José Neto – guitars and vocals
- Gary Meek – alto, soprano and tenor saxophones, flute, keyboards, Hammond organ, glockenspiel and EWI
- Diana Moreira – vocals (track 5)
- Chil Factor – rap (track 10)
