= Walls of Akendora =

Studio album by Keiko Matsui
- Released: April 5, 2005
- Recorded: September, 2004 – October, 2004
- Studios: Backroom Recording Studio (Glendale, California); Onkio Haus, Planet Joy Studio and Yamaha Ikebukuro (Tokyo, Japan)
- Genres: Jazz, smooth jazz
- Length: 43:56
- Label: Narada
- Producer: Kazu Matsui

Keiko Matsui chronology
Wildflower (2004)	Walls of Akendora (2005)	Moyo (Heart & Soul) (2007)

Walls of Akendora is the eighteenth studio album by jazz keyboardist Keiko Matsui, released in 2005 on Narada Records. The album peaked at No. 13 on the US Billboard Top Contemporary Jazz Albums chart.

== Critical reception ==
Professional ratings
Review scores
Source	Rating
AllMusic	4/5 stars

Jonathan Widran of AllMusic, in a 4/5 star review exclaimed, "Matsui fanatics will no doubt be jumping all over maps of her homeland looking for a place called "Akendora," but it's a place of her own creation, where she runs to spend contemplative moments and find peace. Wherever it is, fans of her jazzier side are going to love this collection...Unlike most releases categorized as smooth jazz, this is infused throughout with Matsui's unexpected creative textures."

== Track listing ==
=== CD ===
No.	Title	Writer(s)	Length
1.	"Overture for the City"	Keiko Matsui	04:14
2.	"Crystal Shadow"	Keiko Matsui	04:06
3.	"Mountain Shakedown"	Keiko Matsui	04:09
4.	"Canvas"	Keiko Matsui	04:34
5.	"Akendora's Clock"	Kazu Matsui/Keiko Matsui	04:58
6.	"Walking Through It"	Keiko Matsui	04:37
7.	"Blue Butterfly"	Keiko Matsui	04:35
8.	"Gentle Sands"	Keiko Matsui	04:36
9.	"Walls of Akendora"	Kazu Matsui/Keiko Matsui	03:58
10.	"Bay of Destiny"	Kazu Matsui/Keiko Matsui	04:09

=== DVD ===
No.	Title	Length
1.	"1942, from Russia"
2.	"Ruins of Sonora"
3.	"Bronze Casting"
4.	"Water Lily"
5.	"Light in the Rain"
6.	"Safari"
7.	"The Wind and the Wolf"
8.	"Deep Blue"
9.	"Wildflower"
10.	"Road Movie"

== Credits ==
- Keiko Matsui – acoustic piano
- Hajime Hyakkoku – programming (1, 6–10), arrangements (1, 6–10)
- Cheep Hiroishi – programming (2), arrangements (2)
- Heigo Yokouchi – programming (3), arrangements (3)
- Derek Nakamoto – programming (4, 5), arrangements (4, 5)

=== Production ===
- Cristihan Gutterre – executive producer
- Kazu Matsui – producer
- Takashi Tei – recording, mixing
- Andrew Slade – assistant engineer
- Takahiro Natori – piano tuner
- Kazushige Hirosawa – cover design
- Shuichi Tsunoda – photography
- Masaaki Hamano – hair, make-up
