= Stories to Tell (Flora Purim album) =

Studio album by Flora Purim
- Released: 1974
- Recorded: May–July 1974
- Studio: Fantasy Studios (Berkeley, California)
- Genre: Latin jazz; jazz fusion
- Length: 40:17
- Label: Milestone
- Producer: Orrin Keepnews

Flora Purim chronology
500 Miles High (1974)	Stories to Tell (1974)	Open Your Eyes You Can Fly (1976)

Professional ratings
Review scores
Source	Rating
AllMusic	4/5 stars
Christgau's Record Guide	C
The Rolling Stone Jazz Record Guide	2/5 stars

Stories to Tell is the fourth solo studio album by Brazilian jazz singer Flora Purim that was released in 1974 on Milestone Records.

== Reception ==
AllMusic awarded the album with 4 stars and its review by Jim Newsom states: "Assisted by a cast of jazz/fusion all-stars led by husband Airto Moreira, Purim shows off the wide range of her abilities: from wordless vocal soaring to songs with lyrics in English and Portuguese, from up tempo percussion-driven workouts to beautiful ballads".

== Track listing ==
No.	Title	Writer(s)	Length
1.	"Stories to Tell"	Miroslav Vitouš, Flora Purim, Mario Capolla	3:42
2.	"Search for Peace"	Purim, McCoy Tyner	5:55
3.	"Casa Forte"	Edu Lobo	3:54
4.	"Insensatez"	Vinicius de Moraes, Antônio Carlos Jobim	2:46
5.	"Mountain Train"	Purim, Ernest Hood	3:16
6.	"To Say Goodbye"	Lani Hall, Lobo, Neto De Aruajo	4:05
7.	"Silver Sword" (featuring Carlos Santana)	Vitouš	5:40
8.	"Vera Cruz (Empty Faces)"	Milton Nascimento	5:50
9.	"O Cantador / I Just Want to Be Here"	Filho Motta, Dori Caymmi / Purim, Airto Moreira, King Errison, George Duke, Vitouš	6:42
Total length:			40:17

== Personnel ==
- Flora Purim – vocals
- George Duke – keyboards, ARP synthesizer
- Earl Klugh – guitar
- Airto Moreira – drums, percussion
- King Errisson – conga drums
- Carlos Santana – guitar (track: 7)
- Miroslav Vitouš – bass and Moog synthesizer (track: 1), ARP synthesizer (track: 7)
- Ron Carter – bass (tracks: 2, 3, 4, 6 and 8)
- Raul de Souza – trombone solo (tracks: 3, 6 and 8)
- Oscar Brashear – flugelhorn (tracks: 3 and 8)
- George Bohanon – trombone (tracks: 3 and 8)
- Hadley Caliman – flute, alto flute (tracks: 3, 6 and 8)
- Oscar Castro-Neves – acoustic guitar (tracks: 4, 5, 6 and 8)
- Ernie Hood – zithers, vocals (track: 5)
- Larry Dunlap – piano (track: 5)
