= Moyo (Heart & Soul) =

Studio album by Keiko Matsui
- Released: April 24, 2007
- Recorded: September 12, 2006 - January 4, 2007
- Studios: BH Studio (Los Angeles, California); Firehouse Studios (Pasadena, California); Bonayuma Recording Studio (New York City, New York); Bright Music Studios (Castle Rock, Colorado); CSR Studios (Johannesburg, South Africa); MCJ Studios (Ichikawa, Hyōgo, Japan)
- Genres: Jazz, smooth jazz
- Length: 52:39
- Label: Shout! Factory
- Producer: Keiko Matsui

Keiko Matsui chronology
Walls of Akendora (2005)	Moyo (Heart & Soul) (2007)	The Road... (2011)

Moyo (Heart & Soul) is the nineteenth studio album by jazz keyboardist Keiko Matsui, released in 2007 on Shout! Factory. The album peaked at No. 4 on the US Billboard Top Contemporary Jazz Albums chart.

== Critical reception ==
Professional ratings
Review scores
Source	Rating
AllMusic	4/5 stars
All About Jazz	4/5 stars

Brian Soergel of Jazz Times wrote "Keiko Matsui’s new project feels like it’s very much a new direction for the veteran artist, who made her debut 20 years ago and now blossoms with a new record label. The CD is also the first she’s produced by herself after her divorce from husband Kazu Matsui, who had produced her previous CDs. Keiko Matsui’s elegant acoustic piano melodies are still front and center (never more so than on the simply beautiful “When I Close My Eyes”), but much of the orchestral sweep of previous compositions has given way to an organic, less-is-more direction. She's also added a dash of world music, as she recorded Moyo (Swahili for “heart and soul”) on location with musicians in South Africa, the U.S. and her native Japan."

AllMusic gave Moyo a 4/5 star rating. Jeff Winbush of All About Jazz, in a 4/5 star review remarked, "All the familiar elements of Matsui's music are here. There's new age, world beat, light classical and contemporary jazz all presented in the East-meets-West fashion that has been a constant since she entered the scene with A Drop of Water. (Shout! Factory, 1987)...Moyo is a fascinating next step in Matsui's growth and advancement as a musician of depth, range, grace and talent."

== Track listing ==
No.	Title	Writer(s)	Length
1.	"Moyo"	Keiko Matsui	3:44
2.	"A Great Romance"	Keiko Matsui	4:05
3.	"Into the Night"	Keiko Matsui	4:27
4.	"Caricias"	Keiko Matsui	5:33
5.	"An Evening in Gibraltar"	Keiko Matsui	3:31
6.	"When I Close My Eyes"	Keiko Matsui	4:25
7.	"After the Rain"	Keiko Matsui	4:24
8.	"Allure"	Keiko Matsui	4:34
9.	"Black River"	Keiko Matsui	4:30
10.	"Old Potch Road"	Keiko Matsui	5:55
11.	"Um Novo Dia"	Waldemar Bastos/Keiko Matsui	4:12
12.	"Marula"	Keiko Matsui	3:19

== Personnel ==
=== Musicians ===
- Keiko Matsui – acoustic piano
- Derek Nakamoto – synthesizers (1–10, 12, 13), programming (1–10, 12), arrangements (1–10, 12, 13)
- Grecco Buratto – acoustic guitar (2), cavaquinho (11)
- Lawrence Matshiza – electric guitar (3–5, 7, 8, 10, 13)
- Kunle – electric guitar (6)
- Richard Bona – bass (1, 11), vocals (1), programming (11), acoustic guitar (11), electric guitar (11), percussion (11), backing vocals (11), arrangements (11)
- Lucas Senyatso – bass (2–5, 7, 8, 10, 13)
- Akira Jimbo – drums (1)
- Rob Watson – drums (2–5, 7–10, 13)
- Tlale Makhene – percussion (1, 4, 6)
- Gerald Albright – tenor saxophone (3), soprano saxophone (8)
- Vivian Thulane – saxophones (5), alto saxophone (10)
- Paul Taylor – soprano saxophone (7, 9)
- Bez Roberts – trombone (5, 10)
- Adam Howard – trumpet (5, 10)
- Hugh Masekela – trumpet (5, 10)
- Gary Stockdale – string arrangements (12)
- Waldemar Bastos – vocals (11)

=== Production ===
- Cristihan Gutterre – executive producer, A&R concept, A&R direction, management
- Keiko Matsui – producer
- Richard Bona – producer (11)
- Isao Nagata – executive consultant (Japan)
- Robert Y. Kim – project assistant
- Kate De Vriend – editorial supervisor (USA)
- Jun Sato – photography
- Emily Johnson – package supervisor (USA), artwork (USA)
- Anjel Van Slyke – package design (USA)
- Dan Chapman – package design (Japan)
- Yukiko Chapman – package design (Japan)

Technical credits

- Robert Hadley – mastering at The Mastering Lab (Hollywood, California, USA)
- Warren Ishi – mastering at Onkio Haus (Tokyo, Japan)

USA

- Craig Burbidge – recording (1–10, 12)
- Rob Chiarelli – recording (11), mixing (11)
- Kevin DiBella – assistant engineer (1–10, 12)
- Danny Fongheiser – digital drum editing (2–5, 7–10)
- Bruce Hanifan – piano technician (11)

South Africa

- Jasper Williams – recording
- Colin Finnie – technical engineer
- Paul Ferreiro – assistant engineer
- Siya Bonga – studio assistant
- Cristina Mzizi – studio manager

Japan

- Takashi Tei – recording, mixing
- Toshiki Satamoto – assistant engineer
- Takuru Hanada – piano technician
- Takeshi Yonemura – studio manager
