= Sapphire (Keiko Matsui album) =

Studio album by Keiko Matsui
- Released: 1995
- Studios: Poi Dog Studios (Santa Monica, California); Milagro Sound Recorders (Glendale, California); Pacifique Studios (North Hollywood, California); Mad Dog Studios (Venice, California); MuchTooLoudStudio (Marina Del Rey, California)
- Genres: Jazz, smooth jazz, new age
- Length: 47:31
- Label: White Cat
- Producer: Kazu Matsui

Keiko Matsui chronology
Doll (1994)	Sapphire (1995)	Dream Walk (1996)

Sapphire is the seventh studio album of jazz keyboardist Keiko Matsui, released in 1995 on White Cat Records. This album peaked at No. 9 on the US Billboard Top Contemporary Jazz Albums chart.

== Critical reception ==
Professional ratings
Review scores
Source	Rating
AllMusic	4/5 stars

AllMusic gave the album a 4/5-star rating.

== Track listing ==
No.	Title	Writer(s)	Length
1.	"Safari"	Keiko Matsui	4:32
2.	"Bouncing Bougainvillea"	Keiko Matsui	4:20
3.	"Sonora"	Keiko Matsui	5:41
4.	"Don't Turn on the Light" (featuring Valerie Carter)	Jeff Day/Keiko Matsui	5:11
5.	"Mission"	Keiko Matsui	4:30
6.	"Garden"	Keiko Matsui	4:19
7.	"Tears from the Sun" (featuring Karla Bonoff)	Jeff Day/Keiko Matsui	4:16
8.	"Spanish Galleon"	Keiko Matsui	5:00
9.	"Dragon Wings"	Keiko Matsui	4:51
10.	"Sapphire"	Keiko Matsui	4:51

== Personnel ==
=== Musicians ===
- Keiko Matsui – acoustic piano, keyboards, arrangements (4, 7)
- Derek Nakamoto – keyboards (1–3, 5, 6, 8–10), synthesizers (1–3, 5, 6, 8–10), bass (1–3, 5, 6, 8–10), Logic sequencing (1–3, 5, 6, 8–10), drum programming (1–3, 5, 6, 8–10), rhythm loops (1–3, 5, 6, 8–10), arrangements (1–3, 5, 6, 8–10)
- Rob Mullins – synthesizers (4, 7), drum programming (4, 7), arrangements (4, 7)
- Marcus Miller – bass samples (1)
- John Patitucci – bass samples (2, 8–10)
- Abraham Laboriel – bass samples (3, 6)
- Akira Jimbo – drum loops (2, 9)
- Lenny Castro – percussion (2, 4, 5, 7, 8)
- Michael Fisher – percussion (3, 6, 9)
- Marco Dydo – percussion loops (8, 10)
- Paul Taylor – soprano saxophone (1–3, 7–10)
- Kazu Matsui – shakuhachi (5)
- Valerie Carter – lead vocals (4)
- Karla Bonoff – lead vocals (7)

=== Production ===
- Kazu Matsui – producer
- Rob Mullins – recording
- Derek Nakamoto – recording
- Joel Stoner – recording, mixing
- Steve Hall – mastering at Future Disc (Hollywood, California)
- Morbido / Bizarrio (Venice, California) – creative direction, design, digital imaging
- Julie Dennis – photography
- Tena Bernard – hair, make-up
- Chaim Magnum – wardrobe stylist
- Robert L. Tauro – representation
