= No Borders (Keiko Matsui album) =

Studio album by Keiko Matsui
- Released: 1990
- Studios: Aire L.A. Studios and Milagro Sound Recorders (Glendale, California); Mad Hatter Studios (Los Angeles, California); Studio Sound Recorders (North Hollywood, California); Master Control (Burbank, California)
- Genres: Jazz, smooth jazz, new age
- Length: 41:26
- Label: MCA
- Producer: Kazu Matsui

Keiko Matsui chronology
Under Northern Lights (1989)	No Borders (1990)	Night Waltz (1991)

No Borders is the third studio album by jazz keyboardist Keiko Matsui, released in 1990 on MCA Records. This album peaked at No. 16 on the US Billboard Top Contemporary Jazz Albums chart.

== Critical reception ==
Professional ratings
Review scores
Source	Rating
AllMusic	4/5 stars

AllMusic's Jonathan Widran, in a 4/5-star review, commented "One of the spiritual minded, jazz meets mystical keyboardist's best early efforts, helping her bridge from pure Eastern tinged new age music into gently funky smooth jazz... Keiko's beautiful writing however, is what holds the marvelous collection together."

== Track listing ==
All tracks are written by Keiko Matsui except where noted.

No.	Title	Writer(s)	Length
1.	"The First Four Years"	Keiko Matsui	04:45
2.	"Light in the Rain"	Keiko Matsui	04:33
3.	"The White Corridor"	Keiko Matsui	04:42
4.	"Mover"	Jeff Day/Keiko Matsui	04:39
5.	"The Wind and the Wolf"	Keiko Matsui	05:20
6.	"In the Mist"	Keiko Matsui	03:26
7.	"Three Silhouettes"	Keiko Matsui	04:55
8.	"Kappa (Water Elf)"	Keiko Matsui	04:37
9.	"Souvenir"	Keiko Matsui	04:36
10.	"Believer"	Keiko Matsui	04:35

== Personnel ==
Musicians

- Keiko Matsui – keyboards
- Bill Meyers – synthesizer (1)
- Derek Nakamoto – synthesizer (2, 4, 5, 8, 10), synth strings (9)
- Gary Stockdale – synthesizer (3, 7, 9)
- Suzie Katayama – accordion (4), cello (4)
- Paul Jackson Jr. – guitars (1, 2, 4, 6, 9, 10)
- Robben Ford – guitars (3, 8)
- Pat Kelley – guitars (3, 7)
- Grant Geissman – guitars (7)
- Freddie Washington – bass (1, 6, 10)
- Nathan East – bass (2–4)
- Leland Sklar – bass (5, 8)
- Jimmy Johnson – bass (7)
- Neil Stubenhaus – bass (9)
- Carlos Vega – drums (1, 2, 4, 6, 10)
- Tom Walsh – drums (3, 7, 9)
- Vinnie Colaiuta – drums (5, 8)
- Michael Fisher – percussion
- Lenny Castro – percussion (2, 9)
- Joel Peskin – saxophone (1)
- Eric Marienthal – saxophones (2–4), flute (7)
- Gary Meek – saxophone (9)
- Jon Crosse – saxophone (10)
- Kazu Matsui – shakuhachi (5, 8)
- Phil Ayling – English horn (6, 7), recorder (6), oboe (7)
- Joe Meyer – French horn (1)
- Steven Holtman – trombone (2, 3)
- Bill Armstrong – trumpet (2, 3)
- Clay Jenkins – trumpet (2, 3), flugelhorn (3)
- L. Subramaniam – violin (8)
- Greg Walker – vocals (4)
- Maxi Anderson – chorus vocals (4)
- Phil Perry – vocals (5)

Music arrangements

- Bill Meyers – arrangements (1)
- Derek Nakamoto – arrangements (2, 4, 5, 8, 10)
- Gary Stockdale – arrangements (3, 6, 7, 9)

== Production ==
- Ricky Schultz – executive producer
- Kazu Matsui – producer
- Rob Chiarelli – recording
- Alan Hirshberg – recording
- Rob Seifert – recording
- Dave McNair – mixing (1–7, 9)
- Craig Burbidge – mixing (8, 10)
- Stephen Marcussen – mastering at Precision Disc Mastering (Hollywood, California)
- Jeff Adamoff – art direction
- Daniel Riviera – art direction
- Michael Diehl – design
- Randee St. Nicholas – photography
- Terence Finnegan – hair, make-up
- Deborah Waknin – stylist
- Tauro/ Riviera – management
