= If You Will =

Studio album by Flora Purim
- Released: 2022
- Studio: Astrolábio Studio, Curitiba, Brazil; C.A. Studios, California; Click AudioWorks, Curitiba, Brazil; San Anselmo Studio, California; Säo Saruê Label, Curitiba, Brazil
- Genre: Jazz
- Length: 43:48
- Label: Strut Records; STRUT271LP
- Producer: Flora Purim

Flora Purim chronology
Live in Berkeley (2012)	If You Will (2022)

If You Will is an album by Brazilian jazz vocalist Flora Purim. Her first studio release in over 15 years, it was recorded in Brazil and California, and was issued in 2022 by Strut Records in celebration of the singer's 80th birthday. The album is the creative concept of Italian, London-based, radio-dj Roberta Cutolo who engaged on this remote-production journey with Flora Purim during the pandemic by managing to lock a recording deal with Strut Records in the UK. They conceived and drew up together the idea of a 'Latin-jazz-dance' album with a message which was going to appeal to new audiences as well as the older ones who instantly showed being particularly appreciative of the fact that Flora Purim was unexpectedly releasing something new after such a long time. On the album, which is dedicated to the memory of George Duke and Chick Corea, Purim is joined by a large group of musicians, including her husband, percussionist Airto Moreira, and daughter, vocalist Diana Purim.

According to Purim, If You Will, which features a blend of old and new material, will be her final album. When asked why she recorded it after such a long period of inactivity, she replied: "When I saw what was happening with the world, I felt that God didn't give me the gift of singing for no reason. I think he had something in mind. I'm supposed to help. And I cannot omit myself any longer from what's going on in the world. So I'm going to take it in stride, and I'm going to go back."

== Reception ==
Professional ratings
Review scores
Source	Rating
DownBeat	4/5 stars
AllMusic	4/5 stars
The Guardian	4/5 stars
All About Jazz	3.5/5 stars
Jazzwise	4/5 stars

In a review for DownBeat, J. Poet wrote that Purim's voice "remains supple and expressive," and noted that the new pieces "showcase her continuing artistic growth."

AllMusic's Thom Jurek stated: "If You Will is a revelatory exercise. Purim -- whose voice remains unsullied by time -- is easily one of the most groundbreaking singers jazz has ever produced, but more, she's an architect and translator of vastly intricate, gorgeously articulated sound worlds. Flora Purim is a genre unto herself."

Neil Spencer of The Guardian called the album "a celebratory affair," and remarked: "A well-polished gem – welcome back."

Writing for All About Jazz, Ian Patterson described the album as "a fine testament to a unique figure in contemporary Brazilian music," and commented: "The production values are excellent, as are the performances from Purim and the trusted collaborators with whom she surrounds herself."

In an article for Jazzwise, Jane Cornwell called the album "one of 2022's most exciting releases to date," and noted the "seductive power" of Purim's "emotional, often ecstatic vocals."

Dusted Magazine's Jennifer Kelly wrote: "It's remarkable, throughout, how well Purim has held up, as a singer, as a jazz composer and band leader and as an artist. You wouldn't know, from listening, whether she was 80 or 60 or 20. The songs are vital, pulsing with bright energy, imbued with a lifetime's skill but effervescent."

Cal Gibson of Ban Ban Ton Ton stated: "Flora is not so much raging against the dying of the light as sweetly seducing it, whispering to old father time to wait a little longer... Treasure this album, treasure Flora Purim, treasure life itself: all this will pass but Flora Purim is a timeless joy."

== Track listing ==
1. "If You Will" (George Duke) – 4:10
2. "This Is Me" (Krishna Booker / Diana Purim) – 5:24
3. "500 Miles High" (Chick Corea / Neville Potter) – 6:27
4. "A Flor Da Vida" (Mario Moya / Diana Purim) – 3:25
5. "Newspaper Girl" (José Neto) – 4:53
6. "Dandara" (Felipe Machado / Judith de Souza) – 4:38
7. "Zahuroo" (Celso Alberti / José Neto / Claudia Villela) – 4:27
8. "Dois + Dois = Tres" (Nuno Mindelis) – 5:37
9. "Lucidez" (Krishna Booker / Fabio Nascimento / Diana Purim) – 4:44

== Personnel ==
- Flora Purim – vocals
- Airto Moreira – percussion, drums (track 9), vocals (tracks 5 and 7)
- Diana Purim – vocals (tracks 1, 2, and 4)
- Mikka Mutti – keyboards (tracks 1 and 9)
- Fábio Hess – bass (track 1)
- Léo Costa – drums (tracks 1 and 2)
- Grecco Buratto – guitar, backing vocals (track 2)
- Bryan Velasco – piano, keyboards (track 2)
- Andre de Santanna – bass (track 2)
- Alberto Lopes – percussion (track 2)
- Gibi dos Santos – percussion (track 2)
- Krishna Booker – percussion (tracks 2 and 9), backing vocals (track 9)
- Caro Pierotto – backing vocals (track 2)
- Maria Joana – backing vocals (track 2)
- Emina Shimanuki – (track 2)
- Kana Shimunaki – backing vocals (track 2)
- Mari Nobre – backing vocals (track 2)
- Niura Band – backing vocals (track 2)
- Davi Sartori – electric piano (track 3)
- Thiago Duarte – bass (track 3)
- Endrigo Bettega – drums (tracks 3 and 4)
- Stéphane San Juan – drums (track 4)
- José Neto – guitar (tracks 5, 7, and 8)
- Frank Martin – keyboards (track 5)
- Gary Brown – bass (track 5)
- Celso Alberti – drums (tracks 5 and 8), percussion (track 7)
- Café da Silva – bata (track 5)
- Filó Machado – acoustic guitar, backing vocals (track 6)
- Vitor Pinheiro – backing vocals (track 6)
- Claudia Villela – vocals (track 7)
- Marcio Lomiramda – keyboards (track 8)
- Stéphane San Juan – drums (track 8)
- Fabio Nascimento – acoustic guitar (track 9)
- Todd M. Simon – flugelhorn (track 9)
- Léo Nobre – bass (track 9)
- Filipe Castro – percussion (track 9)
