= Encounter (Flora Purim album) =

Studio album by Flora Purim
- Released: 1977
- Recorded: August 1975 to September 1976
- Studio: Paramount Recording Studios, Los Angeles; Fantasy Studios, Berkeley, California; A&R Recording Studios, New York City
- Genre: Latin jazz; jazz fusion
- Length: 43:04
- Label: Milestone
- Producer: Orrin Keepnews

Flora Purim chronology
Open Your Eyes You Can Fly (1976)	Encounter (1977)	Nothing Will Be as It Was... Tomorrow (1977)

Professional ratings
Review scores
Source	Rating
AllMusic	4/5 stars
The Rolling Stone Jazz Record Guide	2/5 stars

Encounter is a studio album by Brazilian jazz singer Flora Purim that was released in 1977 on Milestone Records.

== Reception ==
AllMusic awarded the album with 4.5 stars and in its review, Scott Yanow calls it: "one of Flora Purim's finest all-around jazz recordings".

== Track listing ==
No.	Title	Writer(s)	Length
1.	"Windows"	Chick Corea	5:37
2.	"Latinas"	Hermeto Pascoal	3:42
3.	"Uri (The Wind)"	Pascoal, Googie Coppola	8:05
4.	"Dedicated to Bruce"	Pascoal, Purim	4:12
5.	"Above the Rainbow"	McCoy Tyner	3:29
6.	"Tomara (I Wish)"	Novelli	4:06
7.	"Encounter"	Airto, Purim, Coppola, Pascoal, Ron Carter, Urszula Dudziak	7:19
8.	"Black Narcissus"	Joe Henderson	6:34
Total length:			40:17

== Personnel ==
- Flora Purim – lead vocals, backing vocals
- Joe Henderson – tenor saxophone (tracks: 1 and 8)
- Raul de Souza – trombone (tracks: 2 and 4)
- McCoy Tyner – acoustic piano (tracks: 5 and 6)
- George Duke – electric piano, synthesizer (tracks: 1, 4, 7 and 8)
- Hermeto Pascoal – electric piano, clavinet, vocals (tracks: 2, 3, 4 and 7)
- Hugo Fattoruso – synthesizer (track: 2)
- Ron Carter – acoustic bass (tracks: 3, 4 and 7)
- Alphonso Johnson – electric bass (track: 8)
- Byron Miller – electric bass (track: 1)
- Airto Moreira – drums, percussion (tracks: 1 to 5, 7 and 8)
- Leon "Ndugu" Chancler – drums, percussion (track: 1)
- Googie Coppola – vocals (track: 7)
- Urszula Dudziak – vocals (track: 7)
