= Full Moon and the Shrine =

Studio album by Keiko Matsui
- Released: April 7, 1998
- Studios: Bindu Studios (Santa Monica, California); CanNam Studio (Reseda, California); Pacifique Studios (North Hollywood, California)
- Genres: Jazz; Smooth jazz
- Length: 49:00
- Label: Countdown
- Producer: Kazu Matsui

Keiko Matsui chronology
Dream Walk (1996)	Full Moon and the Shrine (1998)	Whisper from the Mirror (1999)

Full Moon and the Shrine is the seventeenth studio album by jazz keyboardist Keiko Matsui, released in 1998 on Narada Records. The album peaked at No. 2 on the US Billboard Top Contemporary Jazz Albums chart.

== Critical reception ==
Professional ratings
Review scores
Source	Rating
AllMusic	4/5 stars

Jonathan Widran of AllMusic, in a 4/5-star review exclaimed, "Over the course of her last few albums, Matsui's Lindsey Buckingham -- always at her side, pushing her performance harder and higher -- has been seductive saxman Paul Taylor. On this ethereal mind trip, Full Moon and the Shrine (Countdown/Unity), she doesn't let Taylor stray too far. He's there matching her note for note, dancing skyward like Fred and Ginger under the swirling synth orchestral flavors and snappy hip-hop loops of Derek Nakamoto."

== Track listing ==
No.	Title	Writer(s)	Length
1.	"Night Hawk's Dream"	Keiko Matsui	5:01
2.	"Steps in the Night"	Keiko Matsui	4:16
3.	"Bonfire in the Piano"	Keiko Matsui	4:40
4.	"Southern Crossings"	Keiko Matsui	4:20
5.	"Legend of the Trees"	Keiko Matsui	4:43
6.	"Full Moon and the Shrine"	Keiko Matsui	5:04
7.	"Spirit at the Corner"	Keiko Matsui	5:11
8.	"Toward the Sunrise"	Keiko Matsui	4:15
9.	"Forever, Forever"	Keiko Matsui	4:42
10.	"Meadow"	Keiko Matsui	6:48

== Personnel ==
=== Musicians ===
- Keiko Matsui – keyboards, acoustic piano
- Derek Nakamoto – keyboards, synthesizers, bass, Logic sequencing, drum programming rhythm loops, arrangements
- Abraham Laboriel – bass samples
- Marcus Miller – bass samples
- John Patitucci – bass samples
- Bernie Dresel – drums, percussion
- Paul Taylor – alto saxophone, soprano saxophone
- Kazu Matsui – shakuhachi
- Molly Pasutti – vocals

=== Production ===
- Kazu Matsui – producer
- Ken Deranteriasian – recording
- Derek Nakamoto – recording
- Joel Stoner – recording, mixing
- Steve Hall – mastering at Future Disc (Hollywood, California)
- Julie Dennis – photography
- M3 – art direction
- Robert L. Tauro – career direction

Enhanced CD credits

- Ken Caillat – producer
- Hyman Katz – producer
- Highway One Media Entertainment – design
