= Live at Ronnie Scott's (Fourth World album) =

Live album by Fourth World
- Released: 1992
- Recorded: August 1992
- Genre: Jazz fusion
- Length: 78:11
- Label: Ronnie Scott's Jazz House
- Producer: Fourth World, Chris Lewis

Fourth World chronology
Live at Ronnie Scott's (1992)	Fourth World (1993)

Live at Ronnie Scott's is a live album by the Brazilian jazz group Fourth World, that was released by the Ronnie Scott's Jazz House record label in 1992.

The album was recorded live at Ronnie Scott's Jazz Club and features Airto Moreira and Flora Purim with José Neto, Gary Meek and Diana Moreira.

== Track listing ==
No.	Title	Music	Length
1.	"Fourth World"	Gary Meek, Airto Moreira, José Neto	7:34
2.	"São Felipe"	Neto	15:59
3.	"Lua Flora"	Neto, Flora Purim	11:01
4.	"Time One"	Meek, Purim	8:19
5.	"Step Seven"	Neto	9:08
6.	"Rainha da Noite"	DeSouza, Filió, Filo	6:57
7.	"Sea Horse"	Moreira, Neto	14:24
8.	"Africa"	Moreira, Neto	4:49

== Personnel ==
- Airto Moreira – drums, percussion, vocals
- Flora Purim – vocals, percussion, vocal effects
- José Neto – electric nylon string guitar with polysubbass, vocals
- Gary Meek – tenor, alto and soprano saxophones, flute, synthesizers, vocoder
- Diana Moreira – backing vocals (tracks 3,4 & 8)
