= 500 Miles High (album) =

Live album by Flora Purim
- Released: 1974
- Recorded: July 6, 1974
- Venues: Montreux Jazz Festival, Switzerland
- Genres: Latin jazz; jazz fusion
- Length: 40:46
- Label: Milestone
- Producer: Orrin Keepnews

Flora Purim chronology
Butterfly Dreams (1973)	500 Miles High (1974)	Stories to Tell (1974)

Professional ratings
Review scores
Source	Rating
AllMusic	4.5/5 stars
DownBeat	5/5 stars
The Rolling Stone Jazz Record Guide	2/5 stars

500 Miles High is a live album by Brazilian jazz singer Flora Purim that was recorded at the Montreux Jazz Festival. It was released in 1974 on Milestone Records.

== Release and reception ==
AllMusic awarded the album with 4.5 stars and its review by Jim Newsom states: "the Brazilian songstress delivers a fiery performance that must have been a joy to behold".

== Track listing ==
No.	Title	Writer(s)	Length
1.	"O Cantador"	Dori Caymmi, Nelson Motta	5:09
2.	"Bridge"	Flora Purim	1:45
3.	"500 Miles High"	Chick Corea, Neville Potter	5:30
4.	"Cravo E Canela (Cinnamon and Cloves)" (featuring Milton Nascimento)	Milton Nascimento, Ronaldo Bastos	6:46
5.	"Bahia"	Ary Barroso	4:20
6.	"Uri (The Wind)"	Hermeto Pascoal, Googie Coppola	6:06
7.	"Jive Talk"	Pascoal	9:13
Total length:			40:46

== Personnel ==
- Flora Purim – vocals, percussion
- David Amaro – electric and acoustic guitars
- Pat Rebillot – electric piano, organ
- Wagner Tiso – electric piano, organ
- Ron Carter – bass
- Robertinho Silva – drums, percussion, berimbau
- Airto Moreira – drums, percussion, berimbau, vocals (percussion solos on tracks 4, 5 and 7)
- Milton Nascimento – vocal, acoustic guitar (track 4)
