= Keiko Matsui =

Japanese keyboardist and composer

Keiko Matsui 松居 慶子
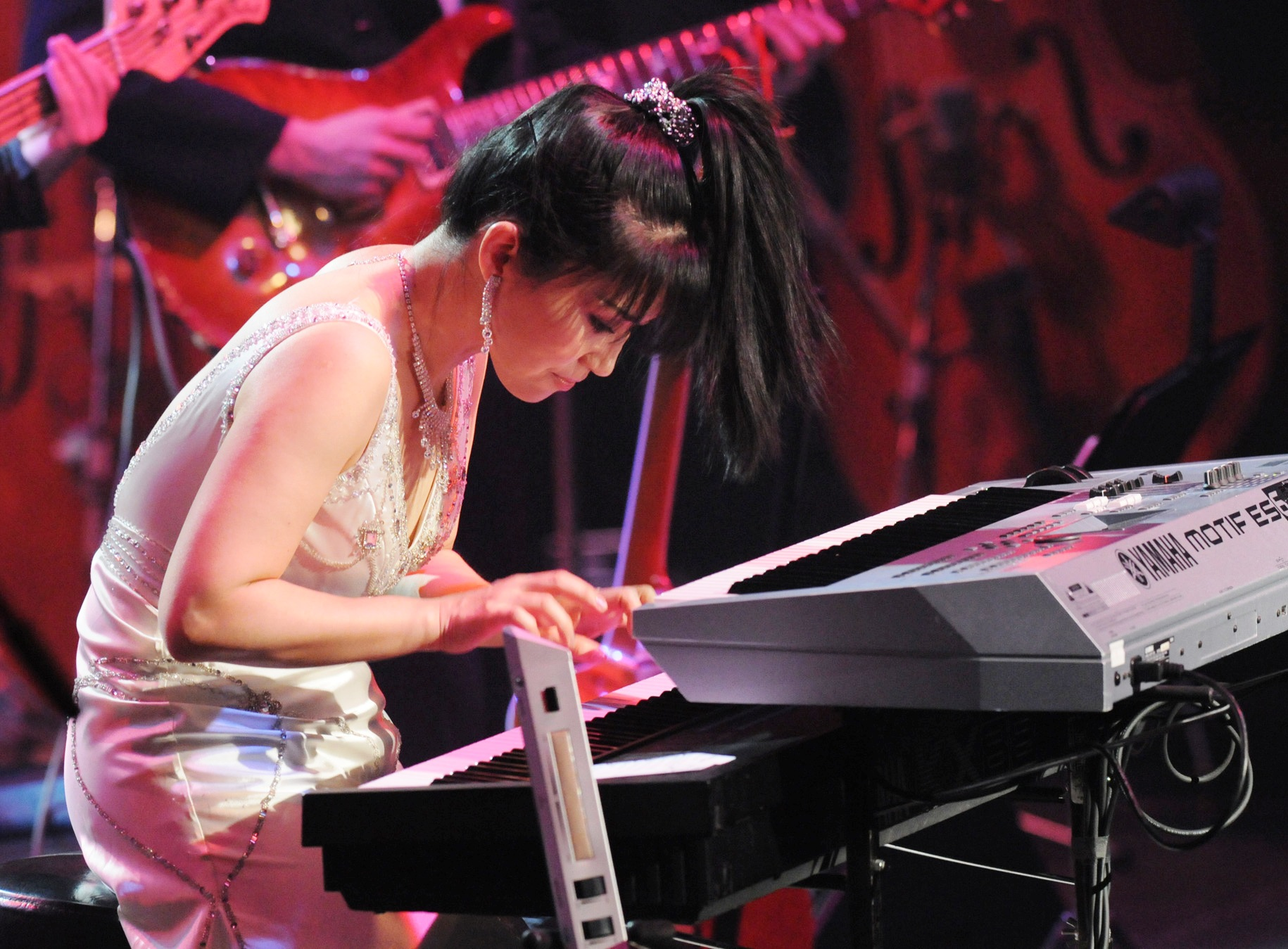
- Matsui performing at DAR Constitution Hall in 2009

Background information
- Born: 土居 慶子 (Keiko Doi); July 26, 1961 (age 64); Tokyo, Japan
- Genres: Smooth jazz, new-age
- Occupations: Musician, composer
- Instrument: Keyboard
- Years active: 1980–present
- Labels: MCA, White Cat, Countdown, Narada, Shanachie
- Website: keikomatsui.com

Keiko Matsui (松居 慶子, Matsui Keiko; born 26 July 1961, as Keiko Doi) is a Japanese keyboardist and composer, specializing in smooth jazz and New-age music.

== Biography ==
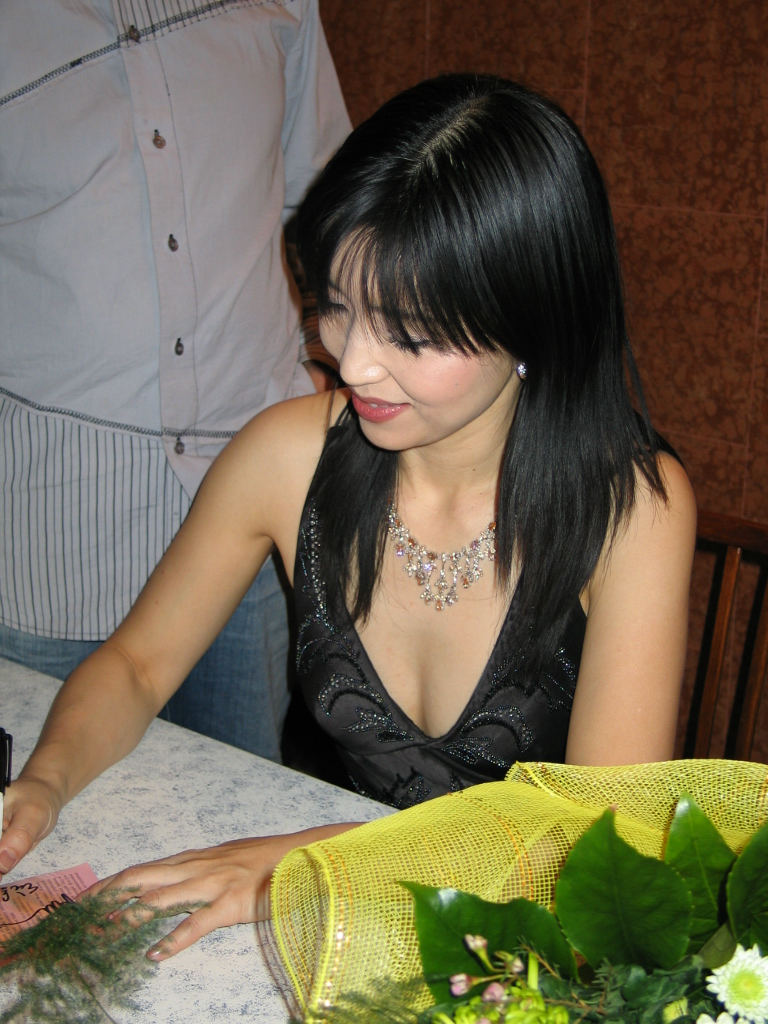
Matsui at an autograph signing, 2006

Keiko Matsui was born in Tokyo, Japan. Her mother, Emiko, took her to her first piano lesson in the June following her sixth birthday. Japanese tradition holds that a child who is introduced to something at this time will continue in those studies for a long time. The tradition held true for Matsui, who studied piano throughout her school years. Though her early training focused on classical music, in junior high school she developed an interest in jazz and began composing her own music.

She studied children's culture at Japan Women's University (日本女子大学, nihon joshidaigaku), then studied at the Yamaha Music Foundation. She started the band Cosmos, which recorded four albums. She recorded her debut solo album, A Drop of Water (Passport, 1987), with her husband Kazu Matsui. She signed with MCA and released the albums No Borders and Under Northern Lights. In 1992 she signed with White Cat. Sapphire (1995) reached No. 1 on the Billboard magazine Contemporary Jazz chart.

She produced her album The Road (Shanachie, 2011) and recorded it with Richard Bona, Vinnie Colaiuta, Jackiem Joyner, and Kirk Whalum. She worked with Bob James on an album during the same year. Many of her songs have been arranged by American composer Gary Stockdale. Her album Soul Quest (2013) reached No. 6 on the jazz chart.

== Sound ==
Matsui blends Western and Eastern music. She has a very spiritual view of composing music, feeling out each composition as though it were, in her words, "coming to me from another space, another dimension," and "catching notes from the silence and then simply placing them together". Matsui sees music as "the great gifts from the human souls from the past, for the children of the future". She believes that music has a power to bring people together and change their lives. "We are connected by music", Matsui wrote, "as the Ocean connects the continents".

A lover of nature, Matsui often makes reference to plants, animals, the elements, and other natural features and phenomena in her song titles. She shows a special fascination with the moon as a number of her compositions refer to the moon in their titles.

== Charity work ==
Her 1997 mini-CD A Gift of Hope went to support the Y-ME National Breast Cancer Organization, and her music appeared in a Lifetime channel special about breast cancer. She performed at an ice skating event in 1997 to support the Susan G. Komen for the Cure. Proceeds from A Gift of Life went to the National Marrow Donor Program and the Marrow Foundation to help Asians for Miracle Marrow Matches, which promotes the registration of people of ethnic minorities as marrow donors to improve their chances of finding a matching donor. Royalties from her album Wildflower supported the United Nations World Food Programme. She performed at the United Nations Headquarters building in New York City on December 17, 2003, to benefit the program.

== Discography ==
=== Solo ===
- A Drop of Water (Passport, 1987)
- Under Northern Lights (MCA, 1989)
- No Borders (MCA, 1990)
- Night Waltz (Sin-Drome, 1991)
- Cherry Blossom (White Cat, 1992)
- Doll (White Cat, 1994)
- Sapphire (White Cat, 1995)
- Dream Walk (Countdown, 1996)
- Full Moon and the Shrine (Countdown, 1998)
- Whisper from the Mirror (Countdown, 2000)
- Hidamari no Ki (2000) soundtrack (Planet Joy 2002)
- Deep Blue (Narada, 2001)
- Deep Blue - solo piano version (Planet Joy Records, 2001)
- The Ring (Narada, 2002)
- The Piano (Narada, 2003)
- White Owl (Narada, 2003)
- Wildflower (Narada, 2004)
- Walls of Akendora (Narada, 2005)
- Moyo (Heart & Soul) (Shout! Factory, 2007)
- The Road... (Shanachie, 2011)
- Altair & Vega with Bob James (eOne, 2011)
- Soul Quest (Shanachie, 2013)
- Journey to the Heart (Shanachie, 2016)
- Echo (Shanachie, 2019)
- Euphoria (Shanachie, 2023)

=== Live albums ===
- Keiko Matsui Live (Countdown, 1999)
- Live in Tokyo (Sony/Columbia, 2002)

=== EP Albums ===
- A Gift of Hope (Unity, 1997)
- A Gift of Life (Narada, 2001)

=== With Cosmos ===
- Hyoryu (Toshiba-EMI, 1980)
- Session III (Yamaha R&D Studio, 1981)
- Can Can Can! (Pony Canyon, 1982)
- Bourbonsuite (Pony Canyon, 1982)
- Musitopia (Pony Canyon, 1983)
- Musou Toshi Pony Canyon, 1984)
- Lensman (soundtrack) (Pony Canyon, 1984)
- Session V (Yamaha R&D Studio, 1985)

=== With Kazu Matsui - as guest ===
- Tribal Mozart (Countdown, 1997)
- Tribal Shubert (Countdown, 1999)
- Tribal Beethoven (Planet Joy, 2001)

=== With others ===
- Just My Tone Mariko Tone (1987)
- Spread Colors, Akira Asakura
- Dancing on the Water, Bob James (Warner Brothers/WEA, 2000)
- Miles to Miles, Jason Miles (Narada, 2005)

=== Compilation albums ===
- Collection (GRP, 1997)
- The Very Best Of Keiko Matsui (Verve, 2004)

=== Videos ===
- Bridge over the Stars
- Full Moon and the Shrine
- Light Above the Trees (Winstar, 1998)
- The Jazz Channel Presents Keiko Matsui (Image Entertainment, 2001) DVD
- White Owl (Narada, 2003) DVD included with the White Owl CD; concert at Bunkamura Orchard Hall (Tokyo, 2002)
- Walls of Akendora bonus DVD included with the music CD; 9 songs with track 10 a home movie of being on the road (2004)
- Live in Tokyo (CD and DVD ) (Shanachie, 2015)
