= Whisper from the Mirror =

Studio album by Keiko Matsui
- Released: May 15, 2000
- Studios: Bindu Studio (Santa Monica, California); Remidi Studio (New York City, New York)
- Genres: Jazz, smooth jazz, new age
- Length: 54:16
- Label: Narada
- Producer: Kazu Matsui

Keiko Matsui chronology
Full Moon and the Shrine (1998)	Whisper from the Mirror (2000)	Hidamari no Ki (Soundtrack) (2000)

Whisper from the Mirror is the seventh studio album by jazz keyboardist Keiko Matsui, released in 2000 on Narada Records. The album peaked at No. 8 on the US Billboard Top Contemporary Jazz Albums chart.

== Critical reception ==
Professional ratings
Review scores
Source	Rating
AllMusic	4/5 stars

Jazz Times' Hilarie Grey, in a review of the album, claimed "A commercially successful artist can afford to take a risk with an artistic departure, as a built-in fan base will be there to tune in. In the case of keyboardist Keiko Matsui’s Whisper From the Mirror those fans (and new initiates) will be rewarded with a richly atmospheric collection showcasing the emotional nuance of Matsui’s classically wrought piano work."

William Rhulmann of AllMusic, in a 4/5-star review,also wrote "Keiko Matsui is usually classified as a jazz musician, which tends to mean that she doesn't get very good reviews, since she is reviewed by jazz critics, while her music actually is best described as a hybrid consisting of equal parts pop, jazz, and new age. Matsui can be an impressive keyboard soloist at times, but her recordings consist of textured tracks that find her featured playing set within a soundscape characterized by synthesized drums and strings. Whisper From the Mirror, her 11th album, is typical of her work, consisting of a series of four- and five-minute instrumental pieces full of shimmering, sustained sounds that pillow Matsui's delicate single-note runs and stately chord patterns."

== Track listing ==
All tracks are written by Keiko Matsui.

No.	Title	Length
1.	"Whisper from the Mirror"	4:38
2.	"Invisible Wing"	5:11
3.	"Tears of the Ocean"	5:30
4.	"Between the Moons"	5:29
5.	"Beyond the Light"	4:26
6.	"Torches on the Earth"	5:02
7.	"Dimensions"	4:24
8.	"Sacanna, No Problem"	4:21
9.	"Midnight Stone"	5:18
10.	"See You There"	4:20
11.	"Ever After" (featuring Bob James)	5:43
12.	"Trees"	4:14

== Personnel ==
=== Musicians ===
- Keiko Matsui – acoustic piano
- Bob James – acoustic piano (11)
- Derek Nakamoto – synthesizers, programming, arrangements
- Kazu Matsui – shakuhachi

=== Production ===
- Kazu Matsui – producer, jacket concept, photography
- Craig Burbidge – mixing
- Derek Nakamoto – recording, mixing
- Ken Freeman – piano and shakuhachi recording
- Steve Hall – mastering at Future Disc (Hollywood, California)
- Misako Kitazawa – jacket design
- Bob James – special artwork (4 hand piano)
- Robert L. Tauro – career direction
