= Open Your Eyes You Can Fly =

1976 album by Flora Purim

Studio album by Flora Purim
- Released: March 1976
- Studios: Paramount Recording Studios, Los Angeles, California
- Genres: Latin jazz; jazz fusion
- Length: 37:16
- Label: Milestone
- Producer: Orrin Keepnews

Flora Purim chronology
Stories to Tell (1974)	Open Your Eyes You Can Fly (1976)	Encounter (1977)

Singles from Open Your Eyes You Can Fly
- 1. "Open Your Eyes, You Can Fly" Released: 1976

Professional ratings
Review scores
Source	Rating
AllMusic	4/5 stars
Christgau's Record Guide	C
The Rolling Stone Jazz Record Guide	2/5 stars

Open Your Eyes You Can Fly is the fifth solo studio album by Brazilian jazz singer Flora Purim. It was released in 1976 via Milestone Records. Recording sessions for the album took place at Paramount Recording Studios in Los Angeles, California. The album features contributions from Airto Moreira on percussion and vocals, David Amaro and Egberto Gismonti on guitars, George Duke on keyboards, Hermeto Pascoal on electric piano and flute, Alphonso Johnson and Ron Carter on bass, Robertinho Silva and Leon "Ndugu" Chancler on drums, and Laudir de Oliveira on congas. One of the songs featured here, Sometime Ago, was composed by Chick Corea with lyrics by Neville Potter and was featured on the eponymous album by Return to Forever produced in 1972, Flora Purim and her husband Airto Guimorvan Moreira also played on that album.

The album peaked at number 59 on the Billboard 200 albums chart and at number 38 on the Top R&B/Hip-Hop Albums chart in the United States. Its title track, a cover version of the Chick Corea/Neville Potter song "Open Your Eyes, You Can Fly", was released as the only album's single.

== Track listing ==
No.	Title	Lyrics	Music	Length
1.	"Open Your Eyes, You Can Fly"	Neville Potter	Chick Corea	4:29
2.	"Time's Lie"	Neville Potter	Chick Corea	5:09
3.	"Sometime Ago"	Neville Potter	Chick Corea	4:44
4.	"San Francisco River"	Neville Potter	Flora Purim	4:06
5.	"Andei (I Walked)" (featuring Airto Moreira)		Hermeto Pascoal	6:11
6.	"Ina's Song (Trip to Bahia)"	Flora Purim	Flora Purim; George Duke; Airto Moreira	3:40
7.	"Conversation"		Hermeto Pascoal	2:34
8.	"White Wing/Black Wing" (featuring Airto Moreira)	Flora Purim	Hermeto Pascoal	5:50
Total length:				37:16

Notes

- Track 1 is a cover of "Open Your Eyes, You Can Fly", which was performed in 1973 by Gary Burton from The New Quartet
- Track 3 is a cover of "Sometime Ago/La Fiesta", which was performed in 1972 by Chick Corea from Return to Forever
- Bomb the Bass' 1994 Hit Single Bug Powder Dust sits on a sample of Alphonso Johnson's opening bassline of the title track.

== Personnel ==
- Flora Purim – vocals
- Airto Guimorvan Moreira – vocals (tracks: 5, 8), congas (track 5), drums (tracks: 7, 8), berimbau (track 8), percussion
- David Amaro – backing vocals (track 1), electric guitar (tracks: 1, 3–7), acoustic guitar (track 2), acoustic 12-string guitar (track 8)
- George Duke – backing vocals (track 1), electric piano (tracks: 1–3, 6), Moog synthesizer (tracks: 4–7), ARP String Ensemble (tracks: 2, 3, 6, 7), clavinet (track 5), ARP Odyssey (track 6)
- Hermeto Pascoal – backing vocals (track 1), flute (tracks: 1–5, 8), electric piano (tracks: 4–8), harpsichord & percussion (track 8)
- Egberto Amin Gismonti – acoustic guitar (tracks: 4, 8)
- Alphonso Johnson – electric bass (tracks: 1–6, 8), acoustic bass (tracks: 2, 6, 7)
- Ron Carter – acoustic bass (tracks: 4, 8)
- Robertinho Silva – drums (tracks: 4–6), berimbau (tracks: 5, 8), percussion (tracks: 6, 8)
- Leon "Ndugu" Chancler – drums (tracks: 1–3)
- Laudir de Oliveira – congas (tracks: 3, 6)
- Orrin Keepnews – producer, sleeve notes
- Kerry McNabb – engineering
- John Golden – mastering
- Jimmy Wachtel – art direction
- Lorrie Sullivan – photography
- Bruce W. Talamon – photograph

== Chart history ==
Chart (1976)	Peak position
US Billboard 200	59
US Top R&B/Hip-Hop Albums (Billboard)	38
