= Soul Quest (Keiko Matsui album) =

Studio album by Keiko Matsui
- Released: July 30, 2013
- Studios: Aftershock Studio, Westwood, California; Automotive Recording, Irvington, New York; Brady Sound, Ronkonkoma, New York; Czech Republic; East West Studio 2; Memphis, Tennessee; New York, New York; NMG Studio, San Pedro, California; Stagg Street Studio, Van Nuys, California; Summit Music; Tarpan Studio, San Rafael, California; The Comforter Studio, Memphis, Tennessee; The Hannibal Studio, Santa Monica, California
- Genres: Jazz, smooth jazz
- Length: 49:27
- Label: Shanachie
- Producer: Keiko Matsui

Keiko Matsui chronology
Altair & Vega with Bob James (2011)	Soul Quest (2013)	Journey to the Heart (2016)

Soul Quest is a studio album by jazz keyboardist Keiko Matsui, released in 2013 on Shanachie Records. The album peaked at No. 2 on the US Billboard Top Contemporary Jazz Albums chart.

== Critical reception ==
Professional ratings
Review scores
Source	Rating
AllMusic	4/5 stars

Jeff Tamarkin of Jazz Times wrote "Everyone can use a good shakeup once in a while to put things into perspective, and the nervous system of Japanese-born pianist and composer Keiko Matsui certainly underwent a serious reboot when she found herself in a Tokyo train station during the massive 2011 earthquake and tsunami that devastated Japan. That scare, balanced out by a happier occasion, the 25th anniversary of her U.S. recording debut in 2012, inform the music on Soul Quest, not surprisingly a work of contrasting emotions and sensibilities."

AllMusic's Thom Jurek, in a 4/5-star review, exclaimed "Soul Quest marks pianist Keiko Matsui's 25th recording anniversary. Since the very beginning, her crystalline piano and accessible yet harmonically rich compositions have been mainstays, not only on the smooth and contemporary jazz scenes, but also on the charts. She enlisted an all-star studio group to assist her on these ten tunes, nine of which she wrote or co-wrote...Soul Quest's greatest achievement lies in its diversity, and in the way Matsui applies her imagination as a composer, improviser, and arranger. It ranks with her finest work."

== Track listing ==
No.	Title	Writer(s)	Length
1.	"Dream Seeker"	Chuck Loeb/Keiko Matsui	5:47
2.	"Black Lion"	Keiko Matsui	4:02
3.	"Top Secret"	Chuck Loeb/Keiko Matsui	5:47
4.	"A Night with Cha Cha"	Keiko Matsui	5:30
5.	"Moving Mountain"	Keiko Matsui	2:55
6.	"Antarctica: A Call to Action"	Keiko Matsui	5:51
7.	"Soul Quest"	Chuck Loeb	4:12
8.	"Proof"	Chuck Loeb/Keiko Matsui	5:01
9.	"Two Hearts"	Keiko Matsui/Narada Michael Walden	5:49
10.	"Stingo"		4:33

== Credits ==
=== Musicians ===
- Keiko Matsui – acoustic piano, vocals (2, 10), keyboards (6)
- Chuck Loeb – keyboards (1, 3, 4, 8, 9), programming (1, 3, 4, 8, 9), guitars (1, 3, 4, 8, 9)
- Derek Nakamoto – keyboards (2, 7), drums (2), loop programming (2), sequencing (7)
- Jim Reitzel – organ (6), keyboards (10)
- Grecco Buratto – acoustic guitar (2)
- Matthew Charles Huelitt – guitars (6)
- Will Lee – bass (1, 4, 8, 9)
- Fernando Saunders – bass (2)
- Marcus Miller – bass (6)
- Eric Baines – bass (7)
- Brian Dunne – drums (1, 3, 4, 8, 9)
- Narada Michael Walden – drums (5, 6, 10), programming (10), vocals (10)
- Andy Snitzer – soprano saxophone (1)
- Kirk Whalum – tenor saxophone (4, 6), soprano saxophone (6)
- David Mann – flute (9), saxophone (9), horn arrangements (9)
- Giulio Carmassi – trumpet (3)
- Cameron Stone – cello (7)

=== Production ===
- Brian Dunne – engineer
- Chuck Loeb – arranger, engineer, producer
- Craig Burbidge – engineer, mixing
- Danny Weiss – executive producer
- Dave Darlington – mastering
- Derek Nakamoto – arranger, producer
- Jim Reitzel – engineer, mixing
- Ken Freeman – engineer
- Narada Michael Walden – arranger, produce
