= A Drop of Water =

Studio album by Keiko Matsui
- Released: 1987
- Studios: Studio Sound Recorders (North Hollywood, California)
- Genres: Jazz, smooth jazz, new age
- Length: 39:15
- Label: Passport
- Producer: Kazu Matsui

Keiko Matsui chronology
Keiko Project (1985)	A Drop of Water (1987)	Under Northern Lights (1989)

A Drop of Water is the debut album of jazz keyboardist Keiko Matsui, released in 1987 on Passport Records. This album peaked at No. 20 on the US Billboard Top Contemporary Jazz Albums chart.

== Critical reception ==
Professional ratings
Review scores
Source	Rating
AllMusic	4/5 stars

AllMusic's Jonathan Widran, in a 4/5-star review, commented "This auspicious introduction to the many aspects of the composer's skills finds her surrounded by a slew of L.A.'s top players, some of whom had yet to begin their own solo careers at this point: Grant Geissman, Brandon Fields, Robben Ford, Nathan East, Vinnie Colaiuta, and Jimmy Johnson. Matsui balances a mystic Eastern edge with a lighthearted new agey pop appeal."

== Track listing ==
All tracks are written by Keiko Matsui except where noted.

No.	Title	Length
1.	"Ancient Wind"	6:22
2.	"Light Above the Trees"	4:48
3.	"Harbor Wind" (Matsui/Jeff Day)	5:40
4.	"Mediterranean Sea" (Matsui/Grant Geissman)	4:20
5.	"A Drop of Water" (Matsui/Day)	5:24
6.	"From My Window"	5:10
7.	"Only Way Home"	3:07
8.	"Fairy" (Matsui/Kim Dodgson)	4:34
9.	"Paper Spirit" (Matsui/Day)	4:49

== Personnel ==
Musicians

- Keiko Matsui – acoustic piano (1, 3–9), synthesizer (1, 3–8)
- Derek Nakamoto – synthesizer (1, 9)
- David Garfield – acoustic piano (2), synthesizer (2)
- Grant Geissman – guitar (1–4, 6–8)
- Robben Ford – guitar (5)
- Nathan East – bass (1, 4, 5, 8)
- Matt Bissonette – bass (2, 7)
- Jimmy Johnson – bass (3, 6)
- John Leftwich – bass (9)
- Vinnie Colaiuta – drums (1, 3–6, 8)
- Gregg Bissonette – drums (2, 7)
- Bernie Dresel – drums (9)
- Michael Fisher – percussion (1–8)
- Luis Conte – percussion (9)
- Kazu Matsui – shakuhachi (1)
- Brandon Fields – saxophone (2–4, 6, 7)
- Walt Fowler – flugelhorn (8)
- Suzie Katayama – cello (5)
- Maxi Anderson – chorus vocals (3, 8)
- Marlena Jeter – chorus vocals (3, 8)
- Marva King – lead vocals (3)
- Carl Anderson – vocals (5), lead vocals (8)
- Molly Pasutti – vocals (9)

Music arrangements

- Derek Nakamoto – arrangements (1, 5, 9)
- Grant Geissman – arrangements (2, 4, 6, 7)
- Pat Coil – arrangements (3)
- Goji Tsuno – arrangements (5)
- Hernie Carnod – arrangements (8)

== Production ==
- Kazu Matsui – producer
- Alan Hirshberg – recording, mixing
- Mitsuru "Teppel" Kasai – mastering at Music Inn Studios (Tokyo, Japan)
- Steve Hall – mastering (US release) at Future Disc (Hollywood, California)
- Katsuyoshi Sakamoto – A&R coordinator
- Jim Snowden – album coordinator
- Takeshi Masuda – art coordinator
- Kathleen Covert – art direction
- Shinya Asami – cover design
- Ken Tanaka – cover design
- Richard Tolbert – front cover photography
- Yoshinori Komiya – back cover photography
- Robert Tauro – representation
