= Wildflower (Keiko Matsui album) =

Studio album by Keiko Matsui
- Released: February 24, 2004
- Recorded: June 2003 – July 2003
- Studios: H.Y. Studio (Japan); Planet Joy Studio and Studio Sound Dali (Tokyo, Japan); Yamaha Studio (Ikebukuro, Japan)
- Genres: Jazz; Smooth jazz
- Length: 49:28
- Label: Narada
- Producer: Kazu Matsui

Keiko Matsui chronology
White Owl (2003)	Wildflower (2004)	Walls of Akendora (2005)

Wildflower is the seventeenth studio album by jazz keyboardist Keiko Matsui, released in 2004 on Narada Records. The album peaked at No. 5 on the US Billboard Top Contemporary Jazz Albums chart.

== Critical reception ==
Professional ratings
Review scores
Source	Rating
AllMusic	4/5 stars

Jonathan Widran of AllMusic, in a 4/5-star review, remarked, "The spiritual and charitable-minded Japanese keyboardist, who blends ethereal new age textures with a rich soul-jazz sensibility better than anyone, is in top form on her 14th studio release. Like its recent predecessors on Narada Jazz, the CD features songs that are all about the landscape between subtlety and drama, elegant piano melodies and improvisations, dramatic flute and sax harmonies, and rich ambiences dense with percussion...Matsui is always so consistent that it's hard to decide if one album ever tops another, but like most albums in her catalog, Wildflower is irresistible in its execution of incredible dynamics throughout." Brian Soergel of JazzTimes noted "Matsui throws in Old World-music elements while keeping her head firmly in the present with some new keyboard sounds and, as always, gets help from her husband, shakuhachi flute player and producer Kazu Matsui...Matsui's music was made for headphones, where you can zone out even as you mentally download the complexity of her music, which can often sound simplistic during initial listenings.

== Track listing ==
All tracks are written by Keiko Matsui.

No.	Title	Length
1.	"Flashback"	4:48
2.	"Facing Up"	4:33
3.	"Sense of a Journey"	4:28
4.	"Brand New Wind"	4:29
5.	"Eldest of All"	4:06
6.	"Reflections"	4:23
7.	"White Castle"	4:31
8.	"Temple of Life"	3:46
9.	"Seeker"	5:07
10.	"Stone Circle"	4:58
11.	"Wildflower"	4:19

== Personnel ==
- Keiko Matsui – acoustic piano
- Hajime Hyakkoku – programming (1–3, 10), arrangements (1–3, 10)
- Heigo Yokouchi – programming (4), arrangements (4)
- Derek Nakamoto – programming (5–7, 9, 11), arrangements (5–7, 9, 11)
- Tomohito Aoki – bass (3, 5, 6, 9, 10)
- Akira Jimbo – drums (3, 5, 6, 9, 10), percussion (3, 5, 6, 9, 10)
- Kazu Matsui – shakuhachi (3, 7)
- Masamichi Nanji – soprano saxophone (4)

=== Production ===
- Masato Arai – executive producer
- Kazu Matsui – producer, liner notes
- Tatsuhito Naruse – recording, mixing
- Yumi Takeuchi – mastering at Orange (Tokyo, Japan)
- Takahiro Natori – piano tuning
- Kazushige Hirasawa – cover design, highway graphics
- Shuichi Tsunoda – photography
- Masaki Hamano – hair, make-up
- Keiko Matsui – liner notes
