= Neighborhoods (Ernest Hood album) =

Studio album by Ernest Hood
- Released: 1975
- Genre: Ambient; avant-garde; field recordings
- Length: 55:02
- Label: Thistlefield

Alternative cover
- 2019 Freedom To Spend reissue

Professional ratings
Review scores
Source	Rating
AllMusic	4/5 stars
The A.V. Club	A−
The Attic	3.5/5 stars
Mojo	4/5 stars
Pitchfork	8.4/10

Neighborhoods is the only studio album from American musician Ernest Hood, self-released in 1975. It is a work of ambient music that explores the soundscapes of Portland, Oregon suburbia through a collage of field recordings layered with Hood's zither and synthesizer melodies. Only one thousand copies were pressed during its original production run. After remaining in obscurity for over 40 years, it was reissued by Freedom to Spend in 2019.

== Background ==
Ernest Hood was born in 1923. He was a jazz guitarist in the Portland, Oregon area in the 1940s. He played with his brother Bill and saxophonist Charlie Barnet. Hood contracted polio in the 1950s, which confined him to using a wheelchair for the rest of his life. As he could no longer hold a guitar, he started playing the zither. He played zither on some of Flora Purim's early albums.

== Production ==
The album was largely composed with zithers and the Roland SH-3A synthesizer.

== Track listing ==
Side one
No.	Title	Length
1.	"Saturday Morning Doze"	7:15
2.	"At The Store"	6:21
3.	"August Haze"	8:00
4.	"The Secret Place"	4:30
Total length:		26:06

Side two
No.	Title	Length
1.	"After School"	11:00
2.	"Gloaming"	7:20
3.	"From The Bluff"	6:23
4.	"Night Games"	4:13
Total length:		28:56

== Personnel ==
- Ernest Hood – Zithers, keyboards, sounds
- Russ Gorsline – Mixing
