= Yutaka Yokokura =

- Also known as: Carlos "Yutaka" Del Rosario, Carlos Y. Del Rosario
- Born: June 26, 1956 (age 70); Tokyo, Japan
- Genres: Jazz, Fusion, Crossover, Pop
- Instruments: Piano, keyboards, synthesizers, koto
- Years active: 1970-present
- Label: GRP Records

Yutaka Yokokura (横倉 裕) is a Japanese pianist, keyboardist, kotoist, arranger and composer. He recorded three albums with GRP Records: Yutaka (1988), Brazasia (1990), and Another Sun (1993).

He previously recorded an album, Love Light, in 1978 by Alfa Records Japan. The album received an American release in 1981 on ALFA international America, with the title single, featuring a lead vocal by Patti Austin, reaching #81 on the Billboard Hot 100.

He also recorded his cover version of Donny Hathaway's This Christmas from the GRP All Star Christmas Collection Vol. 1 in 1988.
