= Doll (Keiko Matsui album) =

Studio album by Keiko Matsui
- Released: 1994
- Studios: Milagro Sound Recorders and Yamaha R & D Studio (Glendale, California); Pacifique Studios (North Hollywood, California)
- Genres: Jazz, smooth jazz, new age
- Length: 44:57
- Label: White Cat Records
- Producer: Kazu Matsui

Keiko Matsui chronology
Cherry Blossom (1992)	Doll (1994)	Sapphire (1995)

Doll is a studio album by Keiko Matsui, released in 1994 by White Cat Records. This album peaked at No. 11 on the US Billboard Top Contemporary Jazz Albums chart.

== Critical reception ==
Professional ratings
Review scores
Source	Rating
AllMusic	3/5 stars

AllMusic's Christian Genzel, in a 3/5-star review, wrote "This pop-jazz recording by Japanese pianist/keyboardist Keiko Matsui is actually better than many comparable contemporary jazz recordings. The melodies are catchy and charming but rather low-key, most of the pieces are quite atmospheric ("1942, From Russia" sounds like a piece from a Hollywood epic), and several unusual moods (for pop-jazz, that is) are explored."

== Track listing ==
No.	Title	Writer(s)	Length
1.	"Bronze Casting"	Keiko Matsui	04:48
2.	"Moroccan Ashes"	Keiko Matsui	04:32
3.	"Doll"	Keiko Matsui	04:37
4.	"Water Lily"	Keiko Matsui	05:07
5.	"Voice of the Heart" (featuring Philip Bailey)	Jeff Day/Keiko Matsui	04:31
6.	"1942, from Russia"	Keiko Matsui	03:07
7.	"Postponed Summer"	Keiko Matsui	04:36
8.	"Eye of the Moon"	Keiko Matsui	04:51
9.	"Funny Things"	Jeff Day/Keiko Matsui	03:59
10.	"Sympathy"	Keiko Matsui	04:49

== Credits ==
=== Musicians ===
- Keiko Matsui – acoustic piano, keyboards
- Derek Nakamoto – synthesizers, drum programming
- Michael Landau – electric guitar (2, 8)
- June Kuramoto – koto (4)
- Thom Rotella – acoustic guitar (9)
- Fernando Saunders – bass (1–5, 7, 8, 10), scat (4)
- Bob Wackerman – bass (9)
- Akira Jimbo – drums (1, 3, 6, 10)
- Michael Becker – percussion loops (2, 8)
- Rob Chiarelli – drum loops (3, 5–7), programming (3, 5–7)
- Lenny Castro – percussion (3)
- Luis Conte – percussion (9)
- Warren Hill – saxophone (1, 3–7, 10)
- Eric Marienthal – saxophone (9)
- Kazu Matsui – shakuhachi (2)
- Steven Holtman – trombone (3)
- Clay Jenkins – trumpet (3)
- Robert Becker – strings (6, 10)
- Larry Corbett – strings (6, 10)
- Sid Page – strings (6, 10)
- Rachel Robinson – strings (6, 10)
- Suzie Katayama – cello (9)
- Philip Bailey – lead vocals (5)
- Molly Pasutti – lead vocals (9)

Music arrangements

- Derek Nakamoto – arrangements, string arrangements (10)
- Michael Becker – arrangements (2, 8)
- Suzie Katayama – string arrangements (6), string conductor (6, 10)

=== Production ===
- Kazu Matsui – producer
- Derek Nakamoto – recording
- Joel Stoner – recording, mixing
- Michael Becker – additional recording
- Les Brockman – additional recording
- Harold English – assistant engineer
- Daniel Yoon – assistant engineer
- Robert Vosgien – mastering at CMS Mastering (Pasadena, California)
- Julie Dennis – photography
- Studio M – art direction
- Denise Landau – hair, make-up
- Helen Mitchell – wardrobe stylist
- Tauro Brothers Management – representation
