= Flora Purim =

Brazilian jazz singer (born 1942)

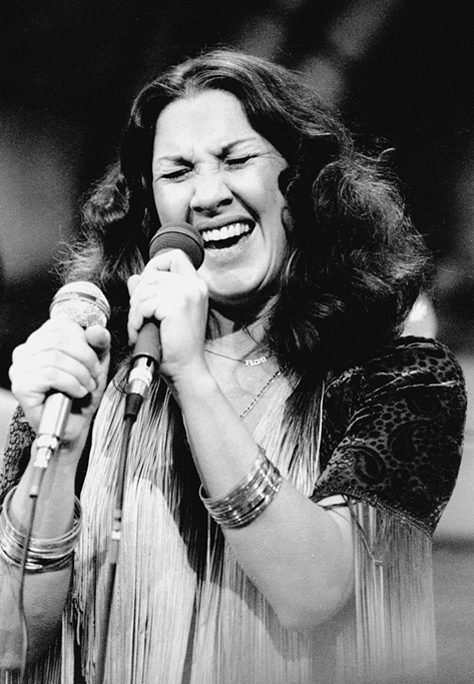
- Purim performing in Saratoga, California, 1981

Background information
- Born: March 6, 1942 (age 84); Rio de Janeiro, Brazil
- Genres: Jazz; bossa nova
- Occupations: Singer; musician
- Instruments: Vocals; percussion
- Years active: 1960s–present
- Labels: Milestone; Warner Bros.; ECM; CTI

Flora Purim (born March 6, 1942) is a Brazilian jazz singer known primarily for her work in the jazz fusion style. She became prominent for her part in Return to Forever with Chick Corea and Stanley Clarke. She has recorded and performed with numerous artists, including Dizzy Gillespie, Gil Evans, Opa, Stan Getz, George Duke, Mickey Hart of the Grateful Dead, Santana, Jaco Pastorius, and her husband Airto Moreira.

In 2002, Purim was the recipient of one of Brazil's highest awards, the 2002 Ordem do Rio Branco for Lifetime Achievement. She has been called "The Queen of Brazilian Jazz".

== Early life ==
Purim was born in Rio de Janeiro, Brazil, to Jewish parents who were classical musicians. Her father Naum Purim played violin and her mother Rachel Vaisberg was a pianist. When her father was out of the house, her mother played jazz.

She would bring home those 78 vinyl RPMs and when my father was at work, she would play them. That was how I got exposed to jazz music... basically listening to Dinah Washington, Billie Holiday, and Frank Sinatra. But also a lot of piano players, such as Bill Evans, Oscar Peterson and Erroll Garner, those were my mother's favorites.

== Career ==
Purim began her career in Brazil during the early 1960s. During this period, she made a recording, entitled Flora e M.P.M., in which she sang bossa nova standards of the day by Carlos Lyra and Roberto Menescal. Later in the 1960s, Purim was lead singer for the Quarteto Novo, led by Hermeto Pascoal and Airto Moreira.

After reaching young adulthood, Purim mixed jazz with radical protest songs to defy the repressive Brazilian government of that time. A 1964 military coup led to censorship of song lyrics, and she later commented on this period of her life as follows: "I wanted to leave Brazil. There's a river there called the San Francisco River. I used to sing to the river, that, as it flowed out to the ocean, it would take me to America."

Shortly before leaving Brazil, Purim and Airto Moreira married. Around 1971, their daughter, Diana, was born. In 1998, Diana married Krishna Booker, son of jazz bassist Walter Booker, nephew of saxophonist Wayne Shorter and godson of pianist Herbie Hancock. Diana later described life with her parents as "[growing] up on the road traveling the world like a gypsy".

Arriving in New York in 1967, Purim and Moreira became immersed in the emerging Electric Jazz. They toured Europe with Stan Getz and Gil Evans. Brazilian musician Moacir Santos taught Purim to read and write music in Los Angeles in the late 1960s. In 1972, alongside Stanley Clarke and Joe Farrell, they were, for the first two albums, members of Chick Corea's fusion band Return to Forever, which released first a self-titled album, Return to Forever, in 1972, followed the same year as Light as a Feather; both received glowing reviews. In 1973, Purim released her first solo album in the United States, titled Butterfly Dreams. It was well received, and soon after she was chosen by the Down Beat reader's poll as one of the top five jazz singers. Purim also worked with Carlos Santana and Mickey Hart at outdoor festivals and on jazz and classical albums through the 1970s. In the early 1970s, Purim was arrested and briefly incarcerated for cocaine possession.

Throughout the 1970s, Purim released a string of albums for the Milestone label. She and her husband Airto were also involved with the Uruguayan band Opa (which means "hi" in Uruguay). While managed by Martin Pichinson, Purim collaborated in vocals in the band's second album Magic Time, and in return, Opa played in "Corre Niña" on Flora's album Nothing Will Be as It Was... Tomorrow (Warner Bros. Records). On the other side of the globe, her biggest solo hit in Asia, particularly in the Philippines, is "Angels".

In the 1980s Purim toured with Dizzy Gillespie's United Nation Orchestra, culminating with Gillespie's Grammy Award-winning album Live at the Royal Festival Hall released in 1990, and then in the 1990s sang on the Grammy Award-winning album Planet Drum by Mickey Hart, the Grateful Dead drummer. Later in the 1990s Purim released her own album and world tour, Speed of Light starting with a month at Ronnie Scott's Jazz Club in Soho, London, with a new band with contributions from Billy Cobham, Freddie Ravel, George Duke, David Zeiher, Walfredo Reyes Jr., Alphonso Johnson, Changuito, Freddie Santiago, and Giovanni Hidalgo, with important writing and performing contributions from Chill Factor and Purim's daughter Diana.

Through the 1990s, Purim worked on a number of broader projects. One such project was a heavy Latin jazz group called "Fourth World", which consisted of her, her husband Airto Moreira, Gary Meek, Gary Brown, José Neto and Jovino Santos-Neto. They released a number of albums and 12" singles: "Fourth World", "Encounters With the Fourth World", "Last Journey" and an album featuring remixes to their songs by several popular electronic DJs from around the world called Return Journey. The band's last album release was in 2000.

In 1996, Purim and her husband Airto collaborated with P.M. Dawn on the song "Non-Fiction Burning" for the AIDS-Benefit album Red Hot + Rio produced by the Red Hot Organization.

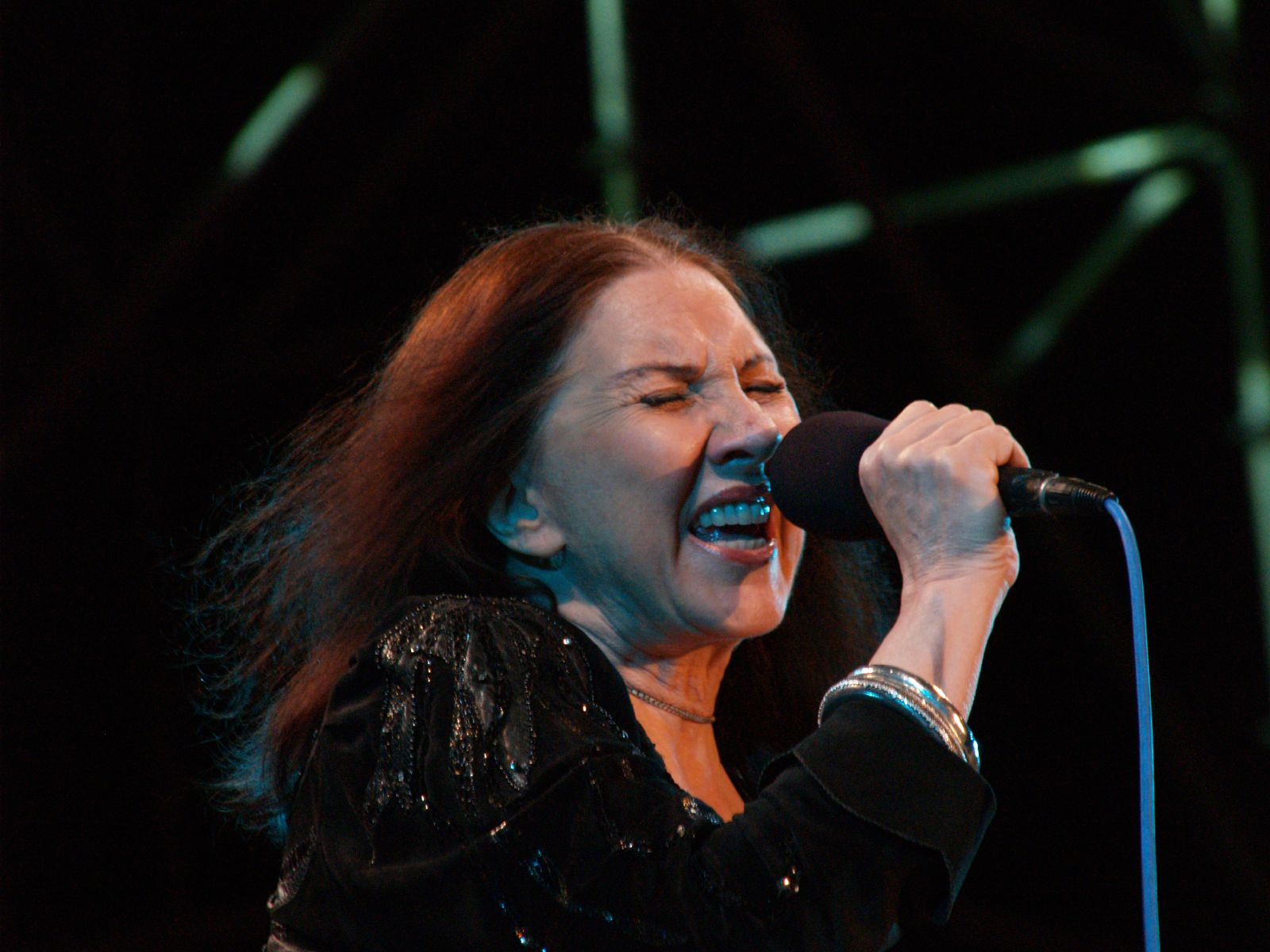
Purim in concert, 2007

The new millennium saw the release of two recordings: Perpetual Emotion (2001) and a crossover homage to one of Brazil's great composers, Flora sings Milton Nascimento (2000). In 2002, during a residency at Ronnie Scott's in London, Purim and her husband Airto, collaborated with British producer Darren Allison and renowned flamenco guitarist Juan Martin on the latter's Camino Latino album. In 2005, she reunited with her old Return to Forever bandleader, Chick Corea. As of 2010, Purim is still actively touring.

== Musical style and influences ==
One of her major musical influences is the Brazilian musician Hermeto Pascoal. Purim has said that Pascoal "play[ed] the Hammond B3 organ, flute, saxophone, percussion, and guitar. He is one of the most complete musicians that I ever met". He also helped train her voice. She also owes a great debt to Chick Corea, discovering the fusion jazz style for which she is best known when Corea asked her to add vocals to some recordings of his compositions.

Purim has a rare six-octave voice. Her vocal style is influenced by Sarah Vaughan and Ella Fitzgerald, which drifts from lyrics to wordlessness without ever losing touch with the melody and rhythm. She expanded her vocal repertoire during early tours with Gil Evans. While touring the world for three years with Gillespie's United Nation Orchestra in the 1980s, she broadened her repertoire to include traditional mainstream jazz, bebop, and doing numbers in 4/4 time instead of the traditional Brazilian 2/4 beat.

Purim has confided that, in recent decades, "There are two albums that are at my bedside. They are Miles Ahead, the first collaboration between Miles Davis and Gil Evans and Blow by Blow, by Jeff Beck. They are with me every night".

== Personal life ==
=== Imprisonment and FCI Terminal Island concert ===
Purim was imprisoned at Federal Correctional Institution, Terminal Island in Los Angeles, California in August 1974 for cocaine possession; she was given the inmate number 2775. During her year and a half imprisonment from 1974 to 1976, she organized a concert on March 3, 1975, which brought in some famous musicians from the outside: George Duke, Airto Moreira, Miroslav Vitouš, Raul de Souza and Leon "Ndugu" Chancler. Purim usually performed these concerts with little or no rehearsal time, for about an hour. One performance was broadcast on KBCA FM (105.1), an L.A.-based jazz station. Among the tunes they performed were Chick Corea's "Light as a Feather", "500 Miles High", and "Celebration Suite". This was the first time such a co-operation between civilians and inmates had ever taken place.

=== Family and faith ===
Purim's mother, Rachel Vaisberg, is Brazilian-Jewish. Her father, Naum Purim (1912–1992), was a Romanian Jewish immigrant from Moghilău, then part of the Russian Empire (now Ukraine). Her sister Yana Purim (Bernstein) is also a jazz singer. She also adheres to the Baháʼí Faith thanks in large part to Dizzy Gillespie. Gillespie's death in 1993 prompted Purim in 2002 to comment on his influence on her – "...I loved him also because he gave me a lot of insight and spirituality, he even gave me his praying book..."

== Awards and honors ==
- 4-time winner Down Beat′s Best Female Jazz Vocalist
- 2-time Grammy nominee for Best Female Jazz Performance
- Performed on 2 Grammy-winning albums –
  - Dizzy Gillespie and the United Nation Orchestra – Live at the Royal Festival Hall, London (June 10, 1989) (1990) (Best Jazz Album)
  - Mickey Hart's Planet Drum (1991) (Best World Music Album)
- In September 2002, Brazil's President Fernando Henrique Cardoso named Purim and Moreira to the "Order of Rio Branco", one of Brazil's highest honors for those who have significantly contributed to the promotion of Brazil's international relations.

== Discography ==
=== As leader ===
- Flora E M.P.M. (RCA, 1964)
- Butterfly Dreams (Milestone, 1973)
- 500 Miles High (Milestone, 1974)
- Stories to Tell (Milestone, 1974)
- Open Your Eyes You Can Fly (Milestone, 1976)
- Encounter (Milestone, 1977)
- Nothing Will Be As It Was...Tomorrow (Warner Bros., 1977)
- Everyday, Everynight (Warner Bros., 1978)
- That's What She Said (Milestone, 1978)
- Carry On (Warner Bros., 1979)
- Däfos with Mickey Hart, Airto Moreira (Reference, 1983)
- Humble People with Airto Moreira (Concord Jazz, 1985)
- Three-Way Mirror with Airto Moreira (Reference, 1985)
- The Magicians with Airto Moreira (Crossover, 1986)
- The Colours of Life with Airto Moreira (In+Out, 1988)
- The Midnight Sun (Venture, 1988)
- The Sun Is Out with Airto Moreira (Crossover, 1989)
- Queen of the Night (Sound Wave, 1992)
- The Flight (B&W Music, 1994)
- Speed of Light (B&W Music, 1995)
- Flora Purim Sings Milton Nascimento (Narada, 2000)
- Perpetual Emotion (Narada, 2000)
- Speak No Evil (Narada, 2002)
- Flora's Song (Narada, 2005)
- Nos Dois - Flora Purim Sings Milton Nascimento (2006)
- Live in Berkeley with Airto Moreira (Airflow, 2012)
- If You Will (Strut, 2022)

With Airto Moreira

- Natural Feelings (Buddah, 1970)
- Seeds on the Ground (Buddah, 1971)
- Free (CTI, 1972)
- Fingers (CTI, 1973)
- Virgin Land (Salvation, 1974)
- Identity (Arista, 1975)
- Promises of the Sun (Arista, 1976)
- I'm Fine, How Are You? (Warner Bros., 1977)
- Touching You...Touching Me (Warner Bros., 1979)
- Wings of Imagination (Concord, 2001)

With Fourth World

- Fourth World Recorded live at Ronnie Scott's (1992)
- Fourth World (1993)
- Fourth World [live] (1995)
- Encounters of the Fourth World (1995)
- Last Journey (1999)

=== As guest ===
- Duke Pearson, How Insensitive (1969)
- Duke Pearson, It Could Only Happen with You (1970)
- Chick Corea and Return to Forever, Return to Forever (1972)
- Chick Corea and Return to Forever, Light as a Feather (1972)
- Santana, Welcome (1973)
- Santana, Borboletta (1974)
- George Duke, Feel (1974)
- Hermeto Pascoal, Slaves Mass (1976)
- Opa, Magic Time (1977)
- Michael Franks, Tiger in the Rain (1979)
- George Duke, A Brazilian Love Affair (1980)
- Rhythm Devils, The Apocalypse Now Sessions (1980)
- Joe Sample, Voices in the Rain (1981)
- Naoya Matsuoka, Hidefumi Toki, Pacific Jam (1981)
- Dizzy Gillespie, Live at the Royal Festival Hall (Enja, 1990)
- Mickey Hart, Planet Drum (1991)
- P.M. Dawn and Airto, Red Hot + Rio (1996)
- Lawson Rollins, Infinita (2008)
- Lawson Rollins, Espirito (2010)

== Filmography ==
=== As a leader ===
- 2006: Airto & Flora Purim: The Latin Jazz All-Stars

=== As sidewoman ===
With Dizzy Gillespie

- Rhythmstick (CTI, 1990)
- Live at the Royal Festival Hall (Enja, 1990)

With Bobby Hutcherson

- Cool Summer (2006)

== Sources ==
- Mei, Giancarlo (2017). Spiriti Liberi. L'Avventura Brasiliana Di Flora Purim & Airto Moreira (official biography) (in Italian). Rome, Italy: Arcana Jazz. ISBN 978-8862319546.
