= Gary Meek =

American jazz musician (born 1961)

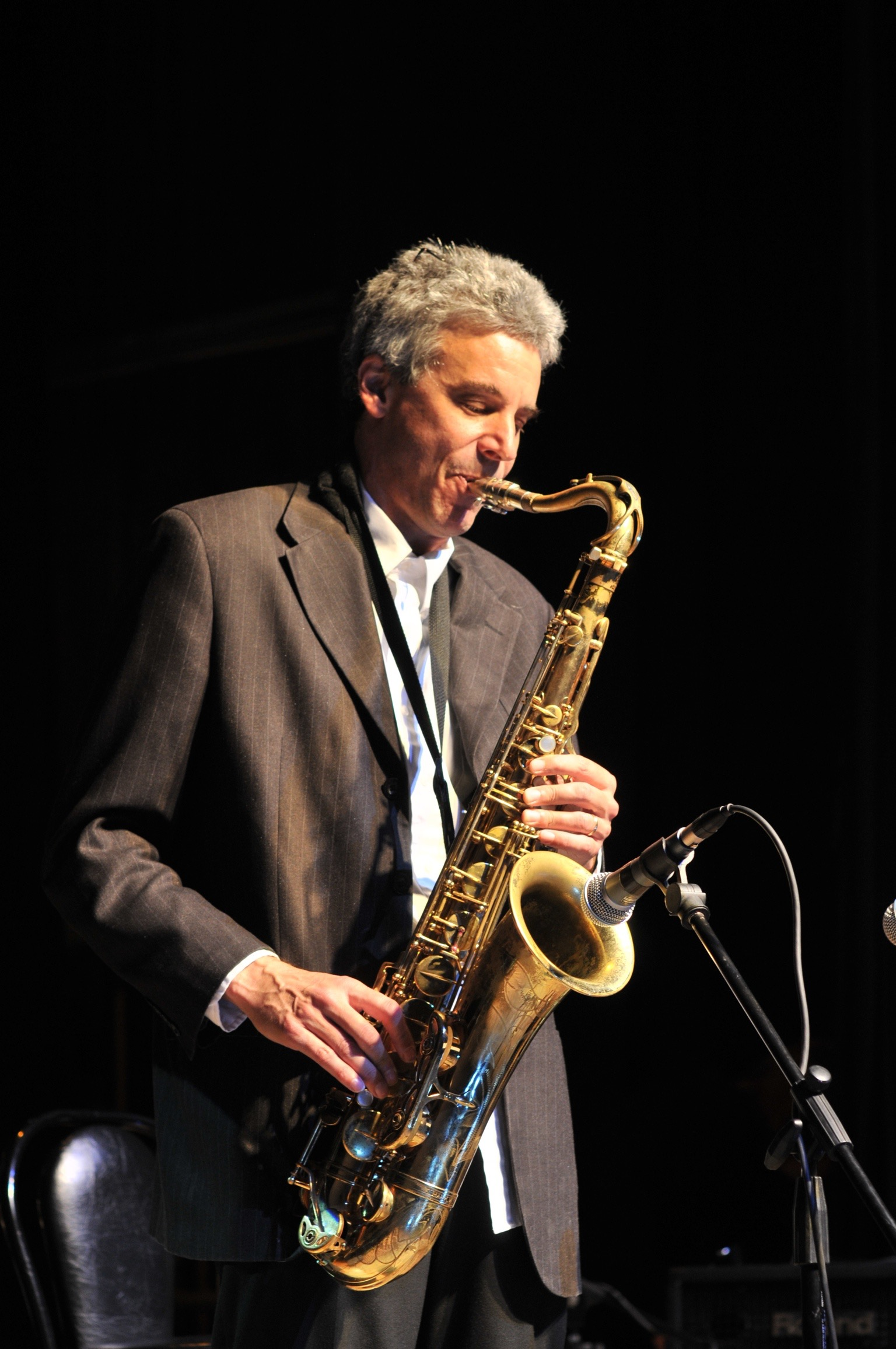

Background information
- Born: March 16, 1961 (age 65)
- Genres: Jazz, Jazz fusion, Latin jazz
- Instruments: saxophone, keyboards
- Years active: 1981–present
- Labels: Lipstick, B&W, MELT 2000, A440 Music Group, Ronnie Scott, Concord, Stretch

Gary Meek (born March 16, 1961) is an American jazz and fusion saxophone and keyboard artist. As a featured artist or session musician he has contributed to more than 150 albums.

== Biography ==
Gary Meek was born in 1961 in Encino, California. His father played piano recreationally. Meek attended El Camino Real High School, where he was active in the music department on clarinet, saxophones and keyboard. After high school he attended Los Angeles Pierce College and subsequently enrolled in the Dick Grove School of Music Professional Instrumental Program.

Meek began his career in the early 1980s playing woodwinds in the big bands of the Los Angeles Jazz Workshop, and keyboards and woodwinds for local club dates, weddings and private parties. In the mid-'80s he toured with Dionne Warwick, playing keyboards.

In 1987, Meek began a two-decade association with Brazilian jazz artists Airto Moreira and Flora Purim. In 1990, joined by Jose Neto, they formed Fourth World. This band toured the U.S., Europe, Asia, South Africa and Eastern Europe for five years, releasing a live album in 1992, Live at Ronnie Scott's. Three years later, Meek joined Herb Alpert's world tour in support of Alpert's Second Wind album. The following year, Meek toured the U.S. and Europe playing saxes, flute and keyboards for Al Jarreau.

Meek's first album as a leader and saxophonist, 1991's Gary Meek, comprises 11 songs all written or cowritten by Meek. He has released four other solo projects to date, including Time One, Live at Ronnie Scott's, Good Friends, and Step 7.

Through the 1990s and early 2000s, Meek began several enduring collaborations, some with artists who contributed session work for his solo efforts. After keyboardist Jeff Lorber appeared on Gary Meek, Meek played for several Lorber albums, including the Billboard Top 5 West Side Stories in 1994. Meek's first studio work for bassist Brian Bromberg, on 1997's You Know That Feeling, led to several tours and albums including Downright Upright, nominated for the "Best Contemporary Jazz Album" Grammy in 2007.

In 2000, Meek played saxophone for Green Day's album Warning, which reached No. 4 on the U.S. Billboard 200 and was certified gold by the RIAA.

In 2003, Meek played woodwinds for the album Playful Heart by guitarist and bossa nova pioneer Oscar Castro-Neves. The release, named one of that year's best albums by Downbeat, included an arrangement of "Four Brothers" that Castro-Neves wrote to feature Meek on all the woodwind parts. Meek was later featured on Castro-Neves' 2006 album All One.

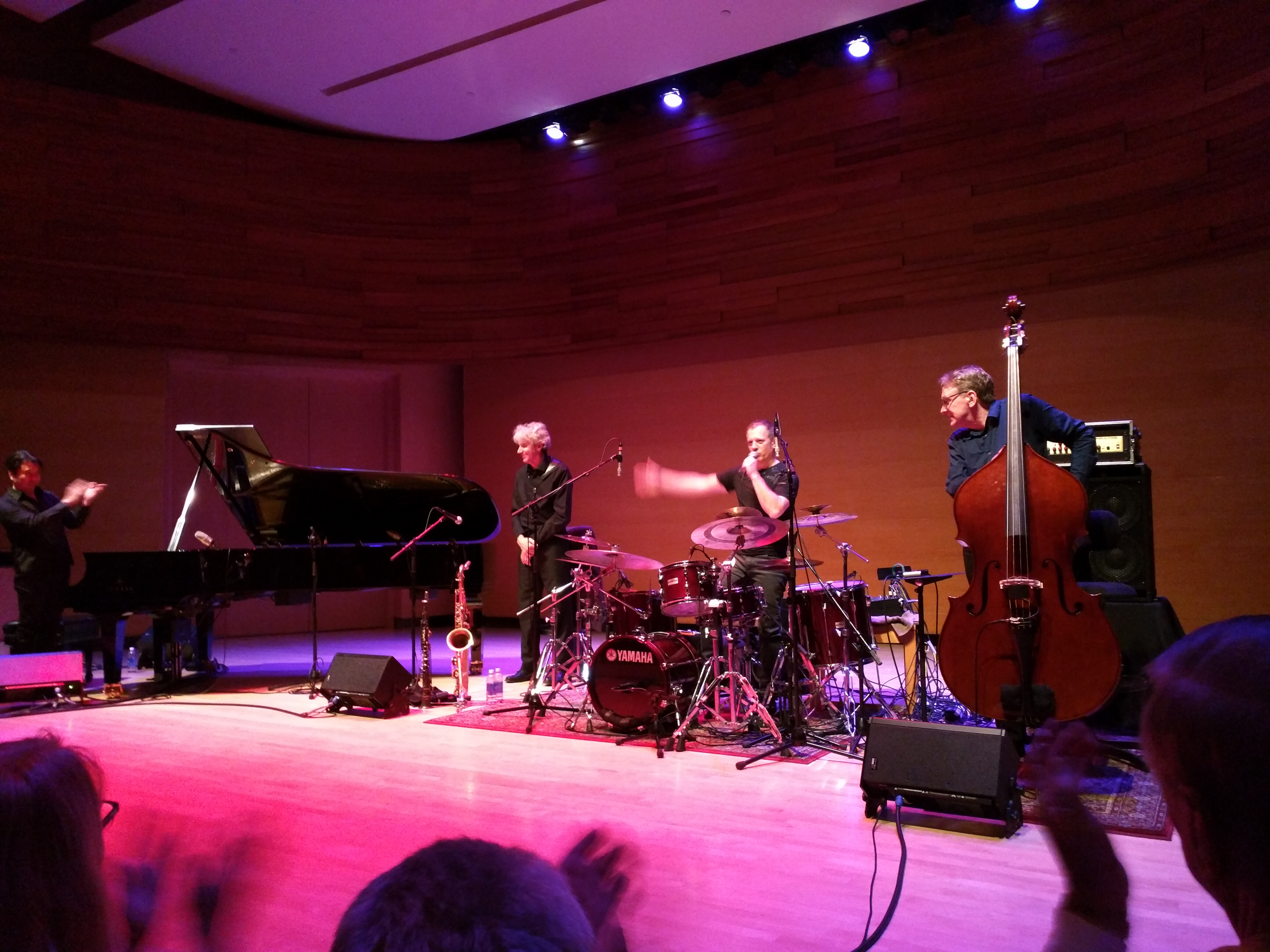
Dave Weckl Acoustic Band in Phoenix, 2016

In 2002, Meek collaborated for the first time with drummer Dave Weckl for the Dave Weckl Band album, Live (and Very Plugged In) and a subsequent world tour. He also played with Weckl for 2005's Multiplicity, and with Weckl and keyboardist Jay Oliver for Convergence in 2012.

In 2015, the Dave Weckl Acoustic Band released its debut album, Of the Same Mind, and subsequently touring in Europe, Asia and the U.S. The band included Weckl, Meek, keyboardist Makoto Ozone and bassist Tom Kennedy.

In 2017 Meek recorded Originals which was listed in Downbeat magazine's "Best Jazz Albums of 2018".

Meek lives with his wife, Maureen, in the Monterey, California area, where he is a traveling clinician for the Monterey Jazz Festival. He also teaches privately, sharing methods passed on to him by Phil Sobel, his teacher of more than 25 years. Meek collaborates globally through Internet recording sessions, and travels to Los Angeles for session work. He plays Cannonball saxophones and D'Addario reeds and mouthpieces.

== Discography ==
Gary Meek:

- 1991 – Gary Meek (Lipstick)
- 1995 – Time One (B&W)
- 1995 – Live at Ronnie Scott's (B&W)
- 1997 – Good Friends (MELT 2000)
- 2002 – Step 7 (A440 Music Group)
- 2017 – Originals

Flora Purim:

- 1988 – The Midnight Sun (Virgin)
- 1994 – The Flight (B&W)
- 2001 – Perpetual Emotion (Narada; also coproduced)
- 2003 – Speak No Evil (Narada; also coproduced)

Airto Moreira:

- 1989 – Struck by Lightning (Virgin/Venture)
- 1993 – Airto and the Gods of Jazz: Killer Bees (B&W)

Airto Moreira and Flora Purim:

- 1988 – The Colors of Life (In+Out)

Fourth World:

- 1992 – Fourth World Recorded Live at Ronnie Scott's Club (Ronnie Scott's Jazz House)
- 1994 – Fourth World (B&W)

Jeff Lorber:

- 1993 – Worth Waiting For (Verve Forecast)
- 1994 – West Side Stories (Verve Forecast)
- 1996 – State of Grace (Verve Forecast)
- 2001 – Kickin' It (Samson)
- 2002 – The Very Best of Jeff Lorber (Verve/GRP)
- 2003 – Philly Style (Narada Jazz)
- 2005 – Flipside (Narada Jazz)
- 2008 – Heard That (Peak)
- 2015 – Step It Up (Heads Up)

Brian Bromberg:

- 1998 – You Know That Feeling (Zebra)
- 2005 – Choices (Artistry)
- 2006 – Jaco (Artistry)
- 2007 – Downright Upright (Artistry)
- 2008 – In the Spirit of Jobim (Artistry)
- 2009 – It Is What It Is (Mack Avenue/Artistry)

Green Day:

- 2000 – Warning (Reprise)

Dave Weckl Band:

- 2003 – Live (and Very Plugged In) (Concord)
- 2005 – Multiplicity (Stretch)

Dave Weckl and Jay Oliver:

- 2014 – Convergence (independent)

Dave Weckl Acoustic Band:

- 2015 – Of the Same Mind (independent)
