= List of songs about New York City =

Many songs are set in New York City or named after a location or feature of the city, beyond simply "name-checking" New York along with other cities.

== 0–9 ==
- "11:11" by Rufus Wainwright
- "11:35" by Aesop Rock
- "11th Street" by Ravens & Chimes
- "11th Street Kids" by Hanoi Rocks
- "100 South of Broadway" by Philadelphia Society
- "105th & Park" by Kenny "Dope" Gonzalez
- "110th Street and Fifth Avenue" by Tito Puente
- "110th Street Rhumba" by Dana Suesse
- "116th and Lenox" by Jackie McLean
- "'12 You Can Never Go Back to New York" by The Magnetic Fields
- "12th Street" by Thick As Thieves
- "121 Bank Street" by George Russell
- "124 East 107th Street" by William Ortiz-Alvarado
- "125th St. And 7th Ave." by Richard Holmes
- "125th Street Congress" by Weather Report
- "125th Street Paradise Bowling Alley" by Chris Gantry
- "125th Street Shuffle" by Jah Thomas
- "1254 New York" by Robert Leroux
- "127th Street March" by Jonah Jones Quartet
- "13 I 73 5:35–6:14:03 PM NYC" by La Monte Young
- "The 135th Street Theme" by Zachary Breaux
- "1394 St. Johns Place" by Dean Fraser
- "13000 Taxi Cabs In NYC" by DJ Vitamix
- "14th Street" by Rufus Wainwright
- "14th Street Beat" by Sylvain Sylvain
- "14th Street Blues" by Leon Redbone
- "14th Street Break" by Beastie Boys
- "133rd Street Boogie" by Sammy Price
- "153rd Street Theme" by Larry Willis
- "1617 Broadway" (from the musical Mr. Wonderful)
- "1650 Broadway Medley" by Carole King
- "1664 Park Avenue" by Janice Robinson
- "17th Street" by Gil Scott-Heron
- "1926" by V; (covered by Thalia Zedek)
- "1train" by A$AP Rocky
- "2 Train" by Mario
- "2 West 46th Street" by Moondog
- "20th December Madison Avenue" by Lisa Miskovsky
- "(212)" by Area Code (212)
- "212" by Azealia Banks
- "23rd Street (Between Park and Madison)" by Bagatelle
- "24 Hrs. to Live" by Mase
- "24th Street Blues" by Lee Ritenour
- "271 Utica Dub" by Prince Jammy
- "29 Greene Street" by Claude Williamson Trio
- "3 Men At Chung King" by Chubb Rock
- "3-O-Clock" by Marco Polo
- "30 Rockefeller Plaza" by Skitch Henderson
- "3rd and Broadway" by Brazzaville
- "31st Street Blues" by Fletcher Henderson
- "317 East 32nd" by Lennie Tristano
- "317 (Manhattan Blues)" by Andy Bown
- "32nd Street" by Dick Jensen
- "32nd Street Love" by Duke Jordan Trio
- "35 West 4th Street" by Don Friedman Trio
- "40 Island" by Noreaga
- "415 Central Park West" by Steve Grossman
- "42nd & 6th" by Till Brönner
- "42nd And Broadway" by Snowboy & The Latin Section
- "42nd Street" by Angelic Upstarts
- "42nd Street" by Golden Earring
- "42nd Street" by Gunhill Road
- "42nd Street" by Harry Warren and Al Dubin
- "42nd Street" by Thunderhead
- "The 42nd Street and Broadway Strut" music by Albert Von Tilzer; lyrics by Neville Fleeson
- "42nd Street Dub" by Prince Jammy
- "42nd Street Dub" by Renegade Soundwave
- "42nd Street Psycho Blues" by Janis Ian
- "44th Street Suite" by McCoy Tyner
- "45 Minutes from Broadway" by George M. Cohan
- "45th Street At 8th Avenue" by Isao Suzuki Quartet
- "46th West 52nd Street" by Chu Berry
- "47th Street Jive" by Andy Kirk
- "48th Street Smile" by Rusty Bryant
- "54" by Bob McGilpin
- "5 Boroughs" by KRS-One with Bounty Killer, Buckshot, Cam'Ron, Keith Murray, Killah Priest, Prodigy of Mobb Deep, Redman, Rev. Run, and Vigilante
- "5 On 84th Street" by Jane Kennaway
- "5th Avenue" by Lee Konitz
- "528 E 13th St" by Dan Melchior
- "51st Street Blues" by Charles Mingus
- "52nd & Broadway" by Patti Austin
- "52nd Street" by Billy Joel
- "52nd Street" by Jack Bruce
- "52nd Street" by Mike Melvoin
- "52nd Street Shadow" by Colin Towns
- "52nd Street Theme" by Bud Powell
- "53rd & 3rd" by The Ramones
- "54th Street" by Mick Jackson
- "58th Street" by Bobby Bryant Sextet
- "59 Chrystie Street" by Beastie Boys
- "59th Street" by Fattburger
- "The 59th Street Bridge Song (Feelin' Groovy)" by Simon & Garfunkel (covered by Ernestine Anderson, Harpers Bizarre)
- "6 Hubert Street" by Blaze
- "6 'N The Mornin'" by Ice-T
- "6B Panorama" by Aesop Rock
- "6PM in New York" by Drake
- "6th Avenue" by india.arie
- "6th Avenue Heartache" by The Wallflowers
- "61 Highway" by Mississippi Fred McDowell
- "63 Sailors In Grand Central Station" by Teresa Brewer
- "63rd Street Theme" by Junior Mance Trio
- "718" by Jaz-O & Immobilarie
- "747 (Strangers in the Night)" by Saxon
- "77 Bleeker Street" by Jill Jones
- "$7000 And You" by The Stylistics
- "7th Avenue" by Big Rude Jake
- "7th Avenue Blue" by King Biscuit Boy & Sonny Del-Rio
- "7th Avenue South" by Dave Weckl
- "7th Avenue South" by Jonathan Butler
- "78th & 3rd" by Lee Ritenour
- "8 Million Stories" by Kurtis Blow
- "80 Blocks From Tiffany's" by Pete Rock & Camp Lo
- "80 Blocks Party" by Pete Rock & Camp Lo
- "81st Street" by Gato Barbieri
- "8th Avenue" by Paul Bley
- "8th Avenue (El Fin)" by Willie Colón
- "8th Avenue Express" by Mary Lou Williams Trio
- "8th Avenue (In the Park)" by Willie Colón
- "8th Avenue Shuffle" by The Doobie Brothers
- "82 VII 15 C. 6:35–7:35PM + C. 6:37–6:52PM NYC" by La Monte Young & Marian Zazeela
- "83rd & 4th" by Zaine Griff
- "86th Street" by The Mob
- "87th Street" by New York Jazz Quartet
- "88 Christopher Street" by Dirt Bike Annie
- "808 Beats" by Unknown DJ
- "9 A.M. (The Comfort Zone)" by Londonbeat
- "93 Ave. B Blues" by Swans
- "9th Ave. Limbo" by Julee Cruise
- "95 And A Half Avenue B New York New York" by Maher Shalal Hash Baz
- "97th & Columbus" by Doc Powell
- "97th & Columbus" by Eric Gale
- "9th Wonder (Blackitolism)" by Digable Planets

== A ==
- "'A' Train Lady" by Mink DeVille
- "A-Train Rush Hour Stomp" by The Third Rail (featuring Rusty Evans from The Deep)
- "ABCs of New York" by Princess Nokia
- "Absolutely Avenue B" by Sonny Vincent
- "Accidentally 4th. St. (Gloria)" by Figures on a Beach
- "The Acieed That Ate New York" by Mark Imperial
- "Across 110th Street Parts 1 & 2" by Bobby Womack
- "Across 110th Street" by El Barrio
- "Adam in New York" by Shorty Rogers
- "Adams in the Apple" by Pepper Adams-Knepper Quintet
- "Add Value Add Time" by Shilpa Ray
- "A.E.I.O.U. (Sometimes Y)" by EBN/OZN
- "Affair on 8th Avenue" by Gordon Lightfoot
- "Africa in Harlem" by Bala
- "Africa Unite" by Bob Marley & The Wailers & will.i.am
- "After JALC (Jazz At Lincoln Center)" by Ahmad Jamal
- "Ain't It Hell Up in Harlem" by Edwin Starr
- "Ain't No Greens in Harlem" by The Vibrations
- "Ain't No Man Manhattan" (from the musical "If/Then")
- "Ain't You Glad (New York)" by Jim Leverton & Geoffrey Richardson
- "Alabama Blues" by St Germain
- "Albee Square Mall" by Biz Markie
- "Albee Square Mall" by Skyzoo & Torae
- "Alexander Hamilton" by Lin-Manuel Miranda
- "Alfie From The Bronx" by Toy Dolls
- "Alice" by Mott The Hoople
- "Alice by the Hudson" by AJR
- "Alive" by Beastie Boys
- "All Aboard for Broadway" (from the musical George M!)
- "All Aboard for Times Square" (music by Dave Stamper; lyrics by Anne Caldwell and Gene Buck)
- "All Alone in New York City" by Tidbits
- "All My Friends in New York" by The Destructors
- "All Night All Right" by Peter Andre featuring Warren G
- "All the Critics Love U in New York" by Prince
- "All The Way From New York" by Wilson Phillips
- "Allen Street" by Pretty Sick
- "Allied Chemical Square" by Jud Strunk
- "The Alligator from West 15th" by Richard Niles
- "All's Quiet on West 23rd" by The Jet Stream
- "Alone in New York in the Rain" by Neil Sedaka
- "Already Home" by A Great Big World
- "Always N.Y." by Mathematics, Buddah, Masta Killa, U-God, Icarus & Inspectah Deck
- "Am Broadway" by Michael Holm
- "Amateur Night in Harlem" by Leonard Feather
- America by Rammstein
- "America" by David Essex
- "America (The Lady of the Harbor)" by The Dillards
- "America" by Stephen Sondheim and Leonard Bernstein
- "American Boy" by Estelle feat. Kanye West
- "American City Suite" by Cashman & West
- "Americanos" by Holly Johnson
- "An Open Letter to NYC" by The Beastie Boys
- "...And Brooklyn Almost Died" by Terry Cashman
- "Angel of Eighth Avenue" by Mott The Hoople
- "Angel of Harlem" by U2
- "Angela" (theme from TV show Taxi) by Bob James
- "The Angels Sing in New York City" by Modern Talking
- "Another Hundred People" by Stephen Sondheim
- "Another Lonely Night in New York" by Robin Gibb
- "Another Rainy Day in New York City" by Chicago
- "Another Rainy Day in New York City" by Bay City Rollers
- "Anvil (Night Club School)" by Visage
- "Any Night on Broadway" (from the musical revue The Passing Show of 1916)
- "Any Night on Old Broadway (music by Jean Schwartz; lyrics by Harold Atteridge)
- "Anything Can Happen in New York" (from the musical film Babes on Broadway)
- "aNYway" by Armand Van Helden & A-Trak Present Duck Sauce
- "Apollo Jump" by Lucky Millinder
- "Apparently Nothin'" by Young Disciples & Large Professor
- "Apple Corps" by Frankie Bones
- "(The Apple) New York" by Chubby Jackson And His Orchestra
- "Apple Pie" by Michel Berger featuring Bill Withers
- "The Apple Stretching" by Grace Jones
- "April in New York" by Joachim Kühn
- "A Room in New York" by Lizzy Mercier Descloux
- "Arcadia" by Nowomowa
- "Are You Ready For Some More?" by Reel 2 Real
- "Area Code 212" by Carsten Bohn's Bandstand
- "Around The World" (from Around the World in 80 Days)
- "Arthur's Theme (Best That You Can Do)" by Christopher Cross
- "Astoria Is In The House" by Trio Connection
- "The A-Team in New York" by Mike Post
- "At the Harlem Centre" by Ricardo King
- "At the Mermaid Parade" by Katell Keineg
- "At the Vanguard" by Joe Lovano Nonet
- "At the World's Fair" by Les Cooper & The Soul Rockers
- "At the Zoo" by Simon & Garfunkel
- "Atlanta Georgia Is a Little New York" by Drink Small
- "Attorney Street" by Ludwig Satz
- "Au Revoir Poland—Hello New York!" by Albert Hague and Marty Brill
- "Audubon" by Sonny Rollins
- "Audubon Ballroom" by Anthony Davis
- "Aurélie New York City" by Gerard Lenorman
- "Auto Theft in New York City" by Ism
- "Autumn in New York" by Vernon Duke sung by Billie Holiday, Ella Fitzgerald, Blossom Dearie and many more.
- "The Ave." by Blue Scholars
- "The Avenue" by Run-DMC
- "Avenue A" by Cranes
- "Avenue A" by The Dictators
- "Avenue A" by King Django
- "Avenue A" (from the television musical 'Mrs Santa Claus')
- "Avenue A" by Tom Cochrane & Red Rider
- "Avenue B" by Gogol Bordello
- "Avenue B" by Iggy Pop
- "Avenue B" by the Major Thinkers
- "Avenue C" by Count Basie and Lambert, Hendricks and Ross
- "Avenue D" by Etta James & David A. Stewart
- "Avenue D" by John Patitucci
- "Avenue Of The Americas (51st Street)" by Moondog
- "Avenue Of The Americas" by Outside Edge
- "Avenue P" by Carole King
- "Away From Home" by Dr. Alban

== B ==
- "B.B.B...Bklyn" by Ms Melodie
- "B.Q.E. Dub" by Prince Jammy
- "Babes on Broadway" by Artful Dodger
- "Babes on Broadway" by Michael Feinstein
- "Baby, N.Y.C." by TWRP and Ninja Sex Party
- "Back Home to Harlem" by Rosewood Thieves
- "Back in Central Park" by Earl Klugh
- "Back in N.Y.C." by Genesis
- "Back in the Village" by Dan Melchior and Das Menace
- "Back in the New York Groove" by Hello
- "Back of a Truck" by Regina Spektor
- "Back to Brooklyn" by Neon
- "Back To Brooklyn" by Prince Markie Dee And The Soul Convention
- "Back to the Bronx" by 2 Live Crew
- "Back to Manhattan" by Norah Jones
- "Back to Manhattan" by Jeffrey Lewis
- "Back To Queens" by Pound Boys
- "Back to Reality" by Intelligent Hoodlum
- "Back When I Was Four" by Jeffrey Lewis
- "Bad Boy" by Holy Modal Rounders
- "Bad Boy" by Wildchild (aka as Roger McKenzie)
- "Bad Boys Of Brooklyn" by Bad Boys
- "Bad New York Band" by Jim Testa
- "Bad Sneakers" by Steely Dan
- "Bainbridge Avenue" by Liam Reilly
- "The Ballad of New York City/John Lennon and Yoko Ono" by David Peel
- "Ballad of N.Y.C." by Fun Lovin' Criminals
- "Ballad of the Lower East Side" by Michael Monroe
- "Ballet at the Village Vortex" (from the musical Wonderful Town)
- "Ballet New York City" by Toots Thielemans
- "Baltimore Is the New Brooklyn" by JC Brooks & the Uptown Sound
- "Barefoot In New York" by Arthur Russell
- "Barrow Street Blues" by Fabio Morgera Quintet
- "Bassline" by Mantronix
- "Battery Blues" by Philly Joe Jones
- "Battery Park/Amnesia" by Thomas Newman
- "The Battle for New York" by David Peel
- "A Bavarian in New York" by Triumvirat
- "Bazooka Joe Don't Live There any More" by Gone Marshall
- "B-Boy Bouillabaisse" by Beastie Boys
- "Be A Believer In Giant Fever" by the Paid Attendance
- "(Be My) New York Doll" by Xpozez
- "Beautiful Disease" by Norah Jones
- "Beautiful New York Nights" by Nancy Wood
- "Because I Got It Like That" by Jungle Brothers
- "Bedford Street" by Nick Holmes (recorded with The Serendipity Singers)
- "Bed-Stuy Blues" by Carlos Garnett
- "Bedstuy Parade & Funeral March" by Mos Def
- "Bedstuy Sound" by Widow Prizum (hip hop)
- "The Beef Is On" by Big Daddy Kane
- "Been Too Long in New York City" by Amii Stewart
- "Believe" by Yellowcard (talks in detail about the firemen involved in the 9/11 attacks)
- "Bell of New York" by Virginia Astley
- "Belle of Avenue A" from the musical comedy 'Tommy Rot' directed by Joseph W. Herbert
- "The Belle of New York" from The Whirl of New York
- "Belles of Broadway" by Del Reeves
- "The Belles of the Bronx" by Otto Harbach and Edward Clark
- "Bells of New York City" by Josh Groban
- "Beneath Your Beautiful" by Emeli Sande
- "Bensonhurst Blues" by Oscar Benton
- "The Best of Queens (It's Us)" by Mobb Deep
- "Bette Davis Eyes" by Kim Carnes
- "Better in Manhattan" by Casey Deinel
- "Bewildered in the city" by Kashmir
- "Beyond Broadway" by Steve Douglas
- "Bicton V's Brooklyn" by Dave Warner
- "The Big Apple" by The Aggrovators
- "The Big Apple" by Frank Froeba
- "Big Apple" by Giant Sunflower
- "Big Apple" by Kajagoogoo
- "The Big Apple" by Kenny Wellington (of Lights of the World)
- "The Big Apple" by Klein & MBO
- "Big Apple" by Molly Hatchet
- "Big Apple" by NTS Roots
- "The Big Apple" by Prince Jammy
- "Big Apple" by UK Subs
- "Big Apple Boogaloo" by Brooklyn Funk Essentials
- "Big Apple Boogie" by Big Apple Brass
- "Big Apple Coconut" by Lee "Scratch" Perry
- "Big Apple Dreamin'" by Alice Cooper
- "Big Apple Jam" by Manhattan Jazz Quintet
- "Big Apple Jump" by Art Blakey
- "Big Apple Noise" by Trans-Lux
- "Big Apple Rappin' (National Rappin' Anthem)" by Spyder-D
- "Big Apple Rock" by Black Ivory
- "Big Apple Sister" by Roland Hanna
- "Big Apple Waltz" by Sweet
- "The Big Backyard" (Up in Central Park) by Sigmund Romberg
- "Big Bad Rap!" by Age Of Chance
- "Biggest Bordertown" by Bob Neuwirth
- "The Big Brass Band from Brazil" by Art Mooney & His Orchestra
- "Big City" by Dead Boys
- "Big Man on Mulberry Street" by Billy Joel
- "Big Mouth" by Whodini
- "Big New York" by Chuck Jackson
- "Big Noise New York" by Donald Fagen
- "Big Shot" by Billy Joel
- "The Big Sound On Broadway" by Sid Ramin
- "Big Town" by OMD
- "The Big Thing (In The Real Apple)" by The Real Thing Featuring Lew Soloff
- "Big Yellow Taxi" by Blue System
- "The Bird of Bleecker Street" by Village Stompers
- "Bird Of Harlem" by Jess Roden
- "Birdland" by Charlie Ventura & His Band
- "Birdland" by Erroll Garner & Stan Getz
- "Birdland" by Weather Report
- "Birdland Blues" by Bud Powell
- "Birdland Bounce" by John Dankworth
- "Birdland Festival" by Kai Winding
- "Birdland Hully Gully" by George Young
- "Birdland Jump" by Paul Quinichette
- "Birdland Story" by James Moody
- "The Birdland Twist" by Beep Bottomley And His Twisters
- "Bird Life In The Bronx" by Raymond Scott
- "B***ch With A Perm" by Tim Dog
- "A Bite of the Apple" by John Davis and the Monster Orchestra
- "B.K. Anthem" by Foxy Brown
- "Bklyn (Live That)" by MC Lyte
- "Black & White New York" by Tommy Keene
- "Black Cow" by Steely Dan (Greene Street, Rudy's)
- "Black Harlem" by Prince Buster
- "Black Jesus † Amen Fashion" by Lady Gaga
- "Black History Month" by Death from Above 1979 (inspired by a ride through the New York subway)
- "Black Velvet Band" by The Dubliners (the Broadway this song refers to is in Belfast Northern Ireland, not New York)
- "Blackout In Manhattan" by Herbie Armstrong (formerly of Fox)
- "Blame It on New York City" by The Dramatics
- "Bleecker & MacDougal" by Fred Neil
- "Bleecker Street" by Gamalon
- "Bleecker Street" by Houston Person
- "Bleecker Street" by Phillip Jarrell
- "Bleecker Street" by Simon & Garfunkel
- "Bleecker Street Blues" by Sal Salvador
- "Bleecker Street Team" by Cedar Walton
- "Blinding Lights" by The Weekend
- "Blondes Have More Fun" by Rod Stewart
- "Blood Wedding" by Black 47
- "Blossoms on Broadway" by Martha Tilton
- "Blue Belles O' Harlem (The Belles Of Harlem)" by Duke Ellington
- "The Blue Bells of Broadway (Are Ringing Tonight)" by Doris Day
- "Blue Bowery" by Clifford Grey and Harold Adamson
- "Blue Harlem" by Ike Quebec
- "Blue Harlem" by Kenyon Hopkins
- "Blue Monday (135th Street)" by George Gershwin
- "Blue Moon Over Brooklyn" by Peter Criss
- "Blues For Brooklyn" by Larry Thurston, written by Jeff Alexander
- "The Blues About Manhattan" by Harry James
- "Blues at the Five Spot" by Oliver Nelson
- "Blues for 52nd Street" by Archie Shepp & Mal Waldron
- "Blues For Birdland" by Johnny Smith
- "The Blues (Lenox Avenue Suite)" by Artie Shaw
- "Bob Dylan's 115th Dream" by Bob Dylan
- "Bobo The Bowery Barber" by Johnny Guarnieri
- "Body of an American" by The Pogues
- "Bojangles of Harlem" (from the musical Swing Time)
- "Bolero At The Savoy" by Gene Krupa
- "Bon Bon Vie (Gimme the Good Life)" by T. S. Monk
- "Bond Street" by Sonny Vincent
- "Bone to Bone (Coney Island White Fish Boy)" by Aerosmith
- "Bonnie Taylor Shakedown" by Hellogoodbye
- "Boogaloo Down Broadway" by The Fantastic Johnny C
- "Boogie Down Broadway" by Canyon
- "Boogie Down Bronx" by Man Parrish
- "Born and Bred in Brooklyn" by Bob Haring
- "Born In Brooklyn" by The Aquatones
- "Born in New York" by Papoose
- "Born Ready" by Dove Cameron
- "Born This Way!" By Cookie Crew
- "Borough Check" by Digable Planets
- "Borrowed Love" by The KLF
- "Bossa Nova in Broadway" by Azymuth
- "Bossa Nova York" by Lionel Hampton & His New York Octet
- "Boston Post Road" (music by Joseph Meyer and Roger Wolfe Kahn; lyrics by Irving Caesar)
- "The Boston Rag" by Steely Dan
- "Boulevardier from the Bronx" (from the musical Colleen)
- "The Bowery" (from the musical A Trip to Chinatown)
- "The Bowery" by Exuma
- "Bowery" by Local Natives
- "Bowery" by Smog
- "The Bowery" by Vincent Youmans, Clifford Grey and Harold Adamson
- "Bowery Avenue" by Tim Rose
- "Bowery Blues" by Lydia Lunch
- "Bowery Buck" by Tom Turpin
- "The Bowery Bums" by "Hobo" Jack Turner (Ernie Hare)
- "The Bowery Electric" by Jed Davis
- "The Bowery Grenadiers" by Mitch Miller
- "Bowery Mood" by Vladimir Cosma
- "Bowery, New York City" by East Side Band
- "The Bowery Of Today" music by Sigmund Romberg; lyrics by Harold Atteridge
- "Box #10" by Jim Croce
- "The Boxer" by Simon & Garfunkel
- "The Boy from New York City" by The Ad Libs
- "The Boy Looked at Johnny" by The Libertines
- "The Boys from Harlem" by Cootie Williams
- "Boys in the City" by NRBQ
- "The Brave Old City of New York" by Helen Miller and Eve Merriam
- "Breakdown New York Style" by Dwayne Omarr
- "Breakfast at Tiffany's" by Henry Mancini
- "Breakfast in Central Park" by Dilana Smith
- "Breakfast in Harlem" by Buck Washington & John W. Bubbles
- "Breakfast in New York" by Jill Johnson
- "Breakfast in NYC" by Oppenheimer
- "Breakdown New York Style" by Rusty The Toejammer
- "Breakin' Up" by Rilo Kiley
- "The Bridge" by MC Shan
- "Bridge & Tunnel" by The Honorary Title
- "The Bridge Is Over" by Boogie Down Productions
- "Bridge To Manhattan" by Hot Tip
- "Brief Uit New York" by Mylène d'Anjou, Frans van Deursen, Vera Mann
- "Bright Lights" by Matchbox Twenty
- "Bright Lights Bigger City" by Cee Lo Green
- "The Brighton Beach Rag" from 'The Girl From Brighton' by L. Wolfe Gilbert
- "Brill Bruisers" by New Pornographers
- "Brill Building" by Sic Alps
- "Bristol Hotel" by LL Cool J
- "Broad-Shouldered Beasts" by Mumford & Sons
- "Broad Street Pressure" by Boyd Jarvis
- "Broadway" by Alison Krauss
- "Broadway" by Alvin Connel (reggae)
- "Broadway" by Billy Bird, Teddy McRae, Henri Woode; associated with Count Basie and covered by Mel Torme, Ella Fitzgerald and others
- "Broadway" by Bill Pritchard
- "Broadway" by Candido
- "Broadway" by The Clash
- "Broadway" by Clem Curtis and The Foundations
- "Broadway" by Darcy DeSylvia
- "Broadway" by Duke Bootee
- "Broadway" by Freddy Cannon
- "Broadway" by Gunter Hampel & His Galaxie Dream Band
- "Broadway" by Guy Marchand
- "Broadway" (from the musical Gypsy: A Musical Fable)
- "Broadway" by Hank Ballard
- "Broadway" by Ian Hunter
- "Broadway" by Jennifer Damiano
- "Broadway" by Jim Diamond
- "Broadway" by Kool & the Gang
- "Broadway" by Lee Fardon
- "Broadway" by Lee Konitz
- "Broadway" by Nicoletta
- "Broadway" by Novecento
- "Broadway" by Old 97s
- "Broadway" by Panama
- "Broadway" by Phylicia Allen
- "Broadway" music by Ray Henderson; lyrics by Buddy DeSylva and Lew Brown
- "Broadway" by Ray Starita And His Ambassadors Band
- "Broadway" by Regal Dance Orchestra
- "Broadway" by Renee Pryor
- "Broadway" by Rocky Roberts
- "Broadway" by Shaggy & Barrington Levy
- "Broadway" by Tiffany
- "Broadway" by Tiger & Tinga Stewart
- "Broadway" by Yellowstone & Voice
- "Broadway – 4 A.M." by Babs Gonzales
- "Broadway Ain't Funky No More" by The Dynatones
- "Broadway and 10th" by Robert Freeman
- "Broadway And 52nd (One For Miles)" by Deep Sensation
- "Broadway at Basin Street" by Cannonball Adderley
- "Broadway Babe" by Mercer Ellington & His Orchestra
- "Broadway Baby" from Dames at Sea
- "Broadway Baby" Stephen Sondheim
- "Broadway Baby Dolls" by Golden Gate Orchestra (an alias of the California Ramblers)
- "Broadway Ballet (Broadway Rhythm)" by Gene Kelly
- "Broadway Beat" by Charlie Singleton And All Stars
- "Broadway Belles" from George White's Scandals of 1919
- "Broadway Blossom" (from the musical Billion Dollar Baby)
- "Broadway Blues" by Arthur Swanstrom (lyrics) and Carey Morgan (music)
- "Broadway Blues" by Jack Hylton
- "Broadway Blues" by Ornette Coleman
- "Broadway Boogie" by Memphis Blues
- "Broadway Boogie" by Sweeney Todd
- "Broadway Boogie Woogie" (from the musical A Class Act)
- "Broadway Boogie Woogie" by David Chesky
- "Broadway Bride" by Grant McLennan
- "Broadway, Broadway" (from the musical A Broadway Musical)
- "Broadway Broken Hearts" by Tony Martin
- "Broadway Butterfly" music by Jean Schwartz and Sigmund Romberg; lyrics by Harold Atteridge
- "Broadway By Night" by Robert Freeman
- "Broadway Caballero" by Horace Heidt
- "The Broadway Cabaret" from 'Over The River' by John Golden
- "Broadway Caravan" by Clifford Scott
- "Broadway Combination" by Dyke and the Blazers
- "Broadway Dub" by Professor & Prince Jammy
- "Broadway Favourites" by Victor Herbert
- "Broadway Foxtrot" by Konrad Elfers
- "Broadway Freeze" by Harvey Scales
- "The Broadway Glide by (music by Bert Grant; lyrics by A. Seymour Brown)
- "Broadway Gypsy Lady" by Linda Clifford
- "Broadway Here I Come" (from Smash)
- "Broadway – Hollywood – Beverly Hills" by Vengeance
- "Broadway Hotel" by Al Stewart
- "A Broadway In Paree" by Sigmund Romberg
- "Broadway Indians (Broadway Indians of Mine)" (music by Dave Stamper; lyrics by Gene Buck)
- "Broadway Is a Tame Street" by Chad Mitchell
- "Broadway Joe" by Mike Mainieri & Friends
- "Broadway Jump" by Slim Gaillard
- "Broadway Jungle" by The Flames
- "Broadway Kisses" by Junko Yagami
- "Broadway Lady" by Nat Adderley
- "Broadway Life" by Allen Harris Band
- "Broadway Maladie" by The Opposition
- "Broadway Mambo" by Perez Prado
- "Broadway Melody" (from the 1929 film of the same name)
- "Broadway Melody of 1974" by Genesis
- "Broadway Memories" by Liza Minnelli
- "A Broadway Musical" (from the musical A Broadway Musical)
- "Broadway, My Street" (from the musical 70, Girls, 70)
- "Broadway, My Street" (from the musical Show Girl)
- "Broadway Nights" by Gerard Joling
- "Broadway Nights" by Rebel
- "Broadway Nights From The Roof Garden" by Lee David, Maury Rubens, Sammy Timberg and Moe Jaffe
- "Broadway On Fire" by Buster Brown
- "Broadway One Step" by Karl King
- "Broadway Pirates" (music by Lew Pollack; lyrics by Sidney Clare)
- "Broadway Rag" by Scott Joplin
- "Broadway Ramble" by Earl Klugh
- "Broadway Reverie" (music by Dave Stamper; lyrics by Gene Buck)
- "Broadway Rheinlander" by Gene Wisniewski
- "Broadway Rhumba" by Phillip Wilson Quartet
- "Broadway Rhythm" by Caroll Gibbons
- "Broadway Rhythm" by Kid Creole & The Coconuts
- "Broadway Rose" by Ted Lewis Jazz Band
- "Broadway Sam" music by Leo Edwards; lyrics by Blanche Merrill
- "Broadway School Days" from The Passing Show of 1916
- "Broadway Serenade (For Every Lonely Heart)" (from Broadway Serenade)
- "The Broadway Show" by Ludwig Englander; lyrics by J. Clarence Harvey and Sydney Rosenfeld
- "Broadway (So Many People)" by Low
- "The Broadway Song" by Cy Coleman and David Zippel
- "Broadway Star" by Barrabás
- "Broadway Stroll" by Manhattan Jazz Quintet
- "The Broadway Swell and the Bowery Bum" by Frank Harding
- "Broadway To The Bridge" by Philip D'Arrow
- "The Broadway Triangle" music by Harry Carroll and Sigmund Romberg; lyrics by Harold Atteridge
- "Broadway Twilight" (from BBC television series 'Play Away')
- "Broadway Walk" by Bobby Womack
- "Broadway Wedding Bells" (music by Carey Morgan; lyrics by Arthur Swanstrom and John Murray Anderson)
- "The Broadway Whirl" (music by Harry Tierney; lyrics by Joseph McCarthy)
- "Broadway's Closer to Sunset Boulevard" by Isley Jasper Isley
- "Broadway's Not A Bad Place After All" by Eddie Cantor and Harry Ruby
- "Broadway's Gone Hill-Billy" by Ramona
- "Broadway's Not Funky Anymore" by Bobby Patterson and the Mustangs
- "The Bronx" by Cold Crush Brothers
- "The Bronx" by Kurtis Blow
- "Bronx And Brooklyn" by Lady V (reggae)
- "Bronx Bad Boys" by Dave Valentin & Herbie Mann
- "Bronx Baseball" by X-Crash
- "The Bronx Bird Watcher" by Allan Sherman
- "Bronx Blue" by Dave Pike
- "Bronx Blues" by Stan Getz & The Oscar Peterson Trio
- "Bronx Bombers" by Errol Holt
- "Bronx Bombers" by Grandmaster Flash
- "Bronx Bull" by D*Note
- "Bronx Exit" by Dave Grusin
- "Bronx Fashion Dub" by Prince Jammy
- "Bronx In A Six" by Sleaford Mods
- "The Bronx Is Beautiful" by Robert Klein
- "Bronx Keeps Creating It" by Fat Joe
- "Bronx Life" by Peshay
- "Bronx Nigga" by Tim Dog
- "Bronx Serenade" by Bill O'Connell
- "Bronx Tale" by Fat Joe
- "The Bronx UFO" by Armand Van Helden
- "Bronx War Stories" by AIG
- "Brookline (Brooklyn, A New York City)" by Noel Pointer
- "Brooklyn" (music by A. Baldwin Sloane; lyrics by E. Ray Goetz)
- "Brooklyn" by Bo Grumpus
- "Brooklyn" by Buckcherry
- "Brooklyn" by Carrie Rodriguez
- "Brooklyn" by Cashmere
- "Brooklyn" by Cody Jameson
- "Brooklyn" by Commander Tom
- "Brooklyn" by DJ Romain & Matt Keys
- "Brooklyn" by Fabolous, Jay-Z, Uncle Murda & Joell Ortiz
- "Brooklyn" by Ehud Banai
- "Brooklyn" by Jesse Malin
- "Brooklyn" by John Henry Sheridan
- "Brooklyn" by MC Lyte
- "Brooklyn" by M.O.P.
- "Brooklyn" by Mos Def
- "Brooklyn" by Natalia Zukerman
- "Brooklyn" by Peter Gordon
- "Brooklyn" by Smoothe Da Hustler
- "Brooklyn" by They Might Be Giants
- "Brooklyn" by We're About 9
- "Brooklyn" by Wizz
- "Brooklyn" by Woodkid
- "Brooklyn" by Yasiin Bey
- "Brooklyn" by Youngblood Brass Band
- "Brooklyn 'A' Train" by Houztown/Basement Boys
- "Brooklyn & Austin" by Sara Evans
- "Brooklyn and Jamaica" by Morgan Heritage
- "Brooklyn At Midnight" by Stanley Jordan
- "Brooklyn Babe" by Dee Dee King
- "Brooklyn Baby" by Lana Del Rey
- "(Brooklyn Baseball) Cantata" from 'Tis of Thee' – musical by Alex North
- "Brooklyn Battles" by Masta Ace
- "Brooklyn Beats" by Scotti Deep
- "Brooklyn Blossom" by Adrian Legg
- "Brooklyn Blue" by Big Rude Jake
- "Brooklyn Blues" by Barry Manilow
- "Brooklyn Blues" by Danny Gottlieb
- "Brooklyn Blues" by Evie Sands
- "Brooklyn Bob" by Jim McNeely
- "Brooklyn Boogaloo" by The Flamingos
- "Brooklyn Boogie" by Louis Prima
- "Brooklyn Bounce" by Daddy-O
- "Brooklyn Bound" by The Black Keys
- "Brooklyn Boy" by Love Generation
- "Brooklyn Breezes" by Kashif
- "Brooklyn Bridge" by Anaïs Mitchell
- "Brooklyn Bridge" by Bobby Bare
- "Brooklyn Bridge" by Buck Owens
- "Brooklyn Bridge" by Carla Bley
- "Brooklyn Bridge" by Casey Neill
- "Brooklyn Bridge" by Darren Hanlon
- "Brooklyn Bridge" by Johnny Desmond
- "Brooklyn Bridge" by Lee DeWyze
- "Brooklyn Bridge" by M-Phazes
- "Brooklyn Bridge" by Rolf Kuehn Group
- "The Brooklyn Bridge" by Sammy Cahn (performed by Frank Sinatra, Mel Tormé, & others)
- "The Brooklyn Bridge Blues" by Eric Andersen
- "Brooklyn, Brooklyn!" by Lord Invader
- "Brooklyn by the Sea" by Mort Shuman
- "Brooklyn Can Hear Your Bargain" by Harriet Schock
- "Brooklyn Days" by The Pack featuring Johnny Maestro
- "The Brooklyn Dodge" by William Bolcom
- "The Brooklyn Dodger Strike" from The First
- "Brooklyn Dodgers" by I Am The Avalanche
- "Brooklyn Dodgers" by Xiu Xiu
- "Brooklyn Dodgers Polka" by Conn. Twins Orchestra
- "Brooklyn Dub" by Prince Jammy
- "Brooklyn Express" by Brooklyn People
- "Brooklyn Friends Groove" by David Morales presents the Red Zone Project
- "Brooklyn Girl" by Modern Folk Quartet
- "Brooklyn Girl Jam" by Poser (soca)
- "Brooklyn Girls" by Black 47
- "Brooklyn Girls" by Catey Shaw
- "Brooklyn Girls" by Charles Hamilton
- "Brooklyn Girls" by Robbie Dupree
- "Brooklyn Go Hard" by Jay-Z feat. Santigold
- "Brooklyn, Goodbye" by Black 47
- "Brooklyn Grew Up" (from the musical Brooklyn)
- "Brooklyn Groove" by Euro Cinema
- "Brooklyn Heights" by Down to the Bone
- "Brooklyn Heights Boogie" by Bob James
- "Brooklyn Heights Stroll" by Dick Hyman
- "Brooklyn High" by Jay-Z
- "Brooklyn Hospitality" by Tony Touch feat. Starang Wondah
- "Brooklyn (If You See Something, Say Something)" by Taking Back Sunday
- "Brooklyn in Da House" by Funkerman
- "Brooklyn in July" by Joe Crookston
- "Brooklyn in My Mind" by Crooklyn Dodgers III
- "Brooklyn In My Bones" by The Natural Born Schmoozers, written by Jeff Alexander
- "Brooklyn in the Blood" (from the musical Brooklyn)
- "Brooklyn in the Summer" by Aloe Blacc
- "Brooklyn (In the Heart of)" by 3 the Hard Way
- "Brooklyn Is A Submarine" by Nick Monaco
- "Brooklyn Is Burning" by Head Automatica
- "Brooklyn/Jersey Get Wild" by M.O.P.
- "Brooklyn Keeps On Takin' It" by Chop Shop
- "Brooklyn Kids" by Pete Townshend
- "A Brooklyn Kind Of Life" by Widow Prizum (hip hop)
- "Brooklyn King" by Masta Killa
- "Brooklyn Kisses" by Janice Robinson
- "Brooklyn Miracle" by Mike Heron
- "Brooklyn Movements" by Da Bush Babees
- "Brooklyn Music" by DJ Cinema, Fabolous, Memphis Bleek
- "Brooklyn N.Y.C." by James Tragas
- "Brooklyn Nights" by Gregg Karukas
- "Brooklyn on a Saturday Night" by Neil Diamond
- "Brooklyn on My Mind" by The Blam
- "Brooklyn (Original Old School)" by 3 the Hard Way
- "Brooklyn (Owes the Charmer Under Me)" by Steely Dan
- "Brooklyn-Paris (Transatlantikonexion)" by La Conspiration Featuring Widow Prizum (hip hop)
- "Brooklyn Pizza Blues" by The Brooklyn Pizzaiolos, written by Jeff Alexander
- "Brooklyn Polka" by Bill Gale (polka artist)
- "Brooklyn Queens" by 3rd Bass
- "Brooklyn Recycles" by Brooklyn Funk Essentials
- "Brooklyn Roads" by Neil Diamond
- "Brooklyn Rock" by Joe Sydenham & Nikola Gala
- "Brooklyn Rock" by Lord Kitchener
- "Brooklyn Rocks The Best" by Cutmaster DC
- "Brooklyn Sky" by Digable Planets
- "Brooklyn Slide" by Los Straitjackets
- "Brooklyn Special" by R Zee Jackson (reggae)
- "Brooklyn Stars" by Matt Pond PA
- "Brooklyn Steakhouse" by Bumblefoot
- "Brooklyn Style" by DeeJay Punk-Roc
- "Brooklyn Style" by Ossie Hibbert
- "Brooklyn Style" by Choice MC's
- "Brooklyn Style...Laid Out" by Big Daddy Kane
- "Brooklyn To Brixton" by Freq Nasty
- "Brooklyn to Broadway" by Pino Donaggio
- "Brooklyn To L.A." by Doctor Ice
- "Brooklyn to T-Neck" by Das EFX
- "Brooklyn Took It" by Jeru The Damaja
- "Brooklyn Tourist" by Chalkdust
- "Brooklyn Two-Step" by Jimmy Shand
- "Brooklyn Uncompromised" by Jeff Berlin
- "The Brooklyn Way" by Lordz of Brooklyn
- "Brooklyn We Go Hard" by Jay-Z
- "Brooklyn Woman" by Lord Kitchener
- "Brooklyn Zoo" by Ol' Dirty Bastard
- "Brooklynonga" (from Argentine Nights)
- "Brooklyn's Finest" by Jay-Z feat. The Notorious B.I.G.
- "Brooklyn's Here" (from Newsies)
- "Brooklyn's In The House" by Cutmaster DC
- "Brooklyn's on Fire" by Nicole Atkins
- "Brooklyn's the Borough" by Tony Touch
- "The Brooklynites" by Soul Coughing
- "Brother" by Gil Scott-Heron
- "Brought Up in New York (Brought Down in L.A.)" by Paul Anka
- "Brownsville" by Queen Latifah
- "Brownsville II Long Beach" by Heltah Skeltah
- "Bruno's Christmas On The Mall" by Tom Chapin
- "Buckingham Palace" by Canibus
- "Bucktown" by Smif-N-Wessun
- "Buckwylyn" by Shyheim
- "Buffalo Gals" by Malcolm McLaren
- "A Buffalo In New York City" by Brandywine Bridge
- "Bulletproof Weeks" by Matt Nathanson
- "Bullets Under Broadway" (from the revue Forbidden Broadway)
- "Bulls in Brooklyn" by The Academy Is...
- "Bulls in the Bronx" by Pierce the Veil
- "Bully of New York" by Ana Egge
- "Burning Hot (Trans Brooklyn Express)" by Brooklyn Express
- "Bushwick Blues" by Delta Spirit
- "Bushwick To Shin-Juku" by Finsta Bundy
- "But I Was Born In New York City" by Paul Evans
- "BX Warrior" by Tim Dog
- "BX We Invented Hip Hop" by Tim Dog
- "Bye-Bye Dear Old Broadway" from Ziegfeld Follies of 1907

== C ==
- "C.R.E.A.M." by Wu-Tang Clan
- "Cab" by Train
- "Cabbies on Crack" by Ramones
- "Cantaloop" by Us3
- "Cafe Manhattan" (from Lady Sings the Blues)
- "Cafe Manhattan Party" (from Lady Sings the Blues)
- "Cafe Regio's" by Isaac Hayes
- "The Cafes (Including The Automat)" by Harry Geller And His Orchestra
- "Cai neve em Nova Iorque" by José Cid
- "Cali to New York" by The Black Eyed Peas
- "California Dreamin'" by The Mamas & The Papas
- "The Call of Broadway" (music by Maurie Rubens; lyrics by Ted Lewis and Jack Osterman)
- "The Camera Eye" by Rush
- "Camino Al Barrio" by Willie Colón
- "Can Broadway Do Without Me?" (from the musical Show Girl)
- "Canal Street" by Love as Laughter
- "Canal Street Cantata" by Harry Geller And His Orchestra
- "Canarsie" by Spanking Charlene
- "The Candy Kid (From the Mission on the Bowery)" by The Cowsills
- "Can't Explain (42nd Street Happenstance)" by Jill Scott
- "Canzone Per Loretta – Addio, Mulberry Street" by Dick Hyman
- "Capricious Harlem" by Joan Morris
- "Captain Jack" by Billy Joel
- "Carmine Vattelly (N.Y.N.Y.C.)" by Celibate Rifles
- "Carnegie Blues" by Duke Ellington
- "Carnegie Hall Blues" by Lionel Hampton
- "Carnegie Hall Pavane (Do-Do-Re-Do)" (from the musical On the Town)
- "Carnegie Horizons" by George Shearing
- "Carnival" by Natalie Merchant
- "Carnival in Harlem" by Tito Puente
- "Carousel in the Park" from Up in Central Park
- "Carry Me Back To Old Manhattan" by Mabel Mercer
- "The Cars That Ate New York" by Paul Roland
- "Castles in Spain (On a Roof in Manhattan)" by Irving Berlin
- "Catch Us At The Met" by Adolph Green and Betty Comden
- "CBGB's" by Syd Straw
- "C'est Magnifique" by Santa Esmeralda
- "Ceilings in the Sky" by Tammany Hall NYC
- "Central Park" by Chick Corea
- "Central Park" by David Hess
- "Central Park" by Harry Geller And His Orchestra
- "Central Park" by Harvey Averne Band
- "Central Park" by Jackie Davies
- "Central Park" by Francis Lai
- "Central Park" by Kazumasa Akiyama
- "Central Park" by King Curtis
- "Central Park" by Les Dudek
- "Central Park" by Martina
- "Central Park" by Maynard Ferguson
- "Central Park" by Mr Hudson
- "Central Park" by Nina Simone
- "Central Park" by Paul Hardcastle
- "Central Park" by Pete Miser
- "Central Park" by Phil Medley
- "Central Park" by Skip Battin
- "Central Park" by Spizzenergi (as Athletico Spizz 80)
- "Central Park" by Union J
- "Central Park Arrest" by Thunderthighs
- "Central Park Blues" by Nina Simone
- "Central Park New York" by The Wiggles
- "Central Park North" by Thad Jones Mel Lewis Jazz Orchestra
- "Central Park Parade" by Syd Dale
- "Central Park Serenade" by Renée Fleming
- "Central Park Stroll" by Mark Snow
- "Central Park Sue" Bohanna
- "Central Park West" by John Coltrane
- "Central Park West" by Kenyon Hopkins
- "Central Park 'n' West" by Ian Hunter
- "Chanteur de jazz" by Michel Sardou
- "Chase Across the 69th Street Bridge" by John Carpenter & Alan Howarth
- "Chase Manhattan" by Paul Haig
- "Chasing the Sun" by Sara Bareilles
- "Chattanooga Choo Choo" by Glenn Miller
- "Cheering For Me Now" by Lin-Manuel Miranda
- "Chelsea" by Counting Crows
- "Chelsea" by The Stiffs
- "Chelsea Avenue" by Patti Scialfa
- "Chelsea Drugs" by Frank Strozier Quintet
- "Chelsea Girls" by Nico
- "Chelsea Girls" by Spirit
- "Chelsea Hotel" by Dan Bern
- "Chelsea Hotel" by The Destructors
- "The Chelsea Hotel" by Graham Nash
- "Chelsea Hotel Nights" by Ryan Adams
- "Chelsea Hotel No 2" by Leonard Cohen
- "The Chelsea Hotel Oral Sex Song" by Jeffrey Lewis
- "Chelsea Morning" by Joni Mitchell
- "Chelsea Rendez-Vous" by Joe Lovano Quintet
- "Cherry Street Cafe" (from the musical Rags)
- "Chicago, New York" by The Aislers Set
- "Chill out" by Black Uhuru
- "Chimes On 42nd Street" by Truth
- "Chinatown" by Dave Grusin
- "Chinatown" by Eric Andersen
- "Chinatown Hustler" by Notorious MSG
- "Chinatown, My Chinatown" music by Jean Schwartz; lyrics by William Jerome
- "Chopin Visits Brooklyn" by Mike Garson
- "Chorus Picking Time on Broadway" music by James F. Hanley; lyrics by Eddie Dowling
- "Christmas God of New York" by Baby Bird
- "Christmas in Brooklyn" by Erik Frandsen
- "Christmas in Harlem" by Kanye West and CyHi Da Prynce and Teyana Taylor
- "Christmas in Hollis" by Run-D.M.C.
- "Christmas in Manhattan" by Toni Arden
- "Christmas in New York" by Donald Jones
- "Christmas in New York" by Lea Michele
- "Christmas in New York" by Lou Christie
- "Christmas in N.Y." by Dr. Buzzard's Savannah Band
- "Christmas in New York" by Backstreet Boys
- "Christmas in Washington Square" by Wayne Newton
- "Christmas Night in Harlem" by Mitchell Parish and Raymond Scott, performed by Louis Armstrong, Jack Teagarden, and others
- "Christmas on Riverside Drive" by Kid Creole
- "Christmas Rappin'" by Kurtis Blow
- "Christopher Columbus" by Guy Mitchell
- "Christopher Street" (from the musical Wonderful Town)
- "The Chrysler Building" by Disco Students
- "Church on White" by Pavement
- "Church Street Blues" by Norman Blake
- "Cinderella Beautiful" by Peter Cincotti
- "Cinderella On Broadway" music by Bert Grant; lyrics by Harold Atteridge
- "The Circle at Fifth" by David Chesky
- "The City" by Fleetwood Mac
- "The City" by Mark-Almond
- "City Bound ("E" Train)" by Novo Combo
- "City of Excuses" by Joseph Gunnar
- "City of Gods" by Fivio Foreign, Kanye West, Alicia Keys
- "City In Heat" by Desmond Child
- "The City is Mine" by Jay-Z
- "City Lights" by The Flamin' Groovies
- "City Love" by John Mayer
- "City of Blinding Lights" by U2
- "City of Immigrants" by Steve Earle
- "City Of New York" by Raymond Scott
- "City of the Dead" by The Clash
- "Citysong" by Luscious Jackson
- "City Sunday Morning Day" by BJ Thomas
- "Calling Out Names" by Kurupt
- "C.L.A.T." by Peppermint, Sasha Velour, Aja and Alexis Michelle
- "Clinton Parkview" by Ernie Watts Quartet
- "Clinton St. Girl" by Wakey Wakey
- "Close To Perfection" by Miquel Brown
- "Cobble Hil" by Gordon Grdina, Gary Peacock, Paul Motian
- "Cobwebs" by Ryan Adams
- "Cocaine in My Brain" by Dillinger
- "Cold As Ice (NYC Blues)" by Prince Charles and the City Beat Band
- "Cold Again" by Freedy Johnston
- "Cold Hands from New York" by Gordon Lightfoot
- "Cold Rock A Party" by MC Lyte
- "Cold Sweat" (Full Version) by James Brown
- "Cold Wild Strong Isle" by Too Nice
- "Cold World" by GZA w/ Life
- "Collect to NYC" by Heatmiser
- "A Colloquial Dream [Scenes In The City]" by Charles Mingus
- "The Colours Of A Soul (Symphony No. 2)" by Lee Johnson
- "Columbus Avenue" by Bill O'Connell
- "Columbus Avenue Sunset" by Stan Bronstein/Elephant's Memory
- "Come Down Sister" by The Throbs
- "Come On Down (To the World's Fair)" by Dean Parrish
- "Come to New York" by Paramount Styles
- "Come Up to My Place" (from the musical On the Town)
- "Comes Once in a Lifetime" (from the musical Subways Are for Sleeping)
- "Comin' Thru The Apple" by Richard Holmes And Les McCann
- "Coming on the Hudson" by Thelonious Monk Quartet
- "Coming to America" by the System
- "Community Property" by Steel Panther
- "Como Nueva York No Hay" by Orquesta Broadway
- "Compton Brooklyn" by SMG
- "Concrete Schoolyard" by Jurassic 5
- "Coney Island" (from the musical A Catered Affair)
- "Coney Island" by Antje Duvekot
- "Coney Island" by Betsy Gay With Al Trace Orchestra
- "Coney Island" by Bill Nelson
- "Coney Island" by Clyde McPhatter
- "Coney Island" by Death Cab for Cutie
- "Coney Island" by Good Old War
- "Coney Island" by Harry Warren
- "Coney Island" by Herb Alpert & The Tijuana Brass
- "Coney Island" by Kincade
- "Coney Island" by Marco Polo & Torae
- "Coney Island" by Martha and the Vandellas
- "Coney Island" by Mel Tormé
- "Coney Island" by Mikael Rickfors
- "Coney Island" by Mike Errico
- "Coney Island (4th Of July)" by Paul Smith & the Intimations
- "Coney Island" (from Simple Simon)
- "coney island" by Taylor Swift and The National
- "Coney Island" by Torae
- "Coney Island" by Woody Guthrie
- "Coney Island Baby" by The Excellents
- "Coney Island Baby" by Lou Reed
- "Coney Island Baby" by Tom Waits
- "Coney Island Baby" (traditional)
- "Coney Island Ballet" by Vernon Duke and John La Touche
- "Coney Island Boat" (from the musical By the Beautiful Sea)
- "Coney Island Chaos" by The Fast
- "Coney Island Cyclone" by Mercury Rev
- "Coney Island Days" by Bruce Sudano
- "Coney Island Dreaming" by Clint Mansell
- "Coney Island Express" by Clint Mansell
- "Coney Island Girl" by Fun Lovin' Criminals
- "Coney Island Low" by Clint Mansell
- "Coney Island Man" by Swing Out Sister
- "Coney Island Moon" by Tom Russell
- "Coney Island Moonlight" by Guitar Crusher
- "Coney Island Night" by Mark Johnson
- "Coney Island of Your Mind" by The Wisdom of Harry
- "Coney Island Rag" by David Chesky
- "Coney Island Sally" by Fifth Estate
- "Coney Island USA" (from the musical I Had a Ball)
- "Coney Island Visit" by Kenyon Hopkins
- "The Coney Island Waltz" (from the musical Love Never Dies)
- "Coney Island Washboard" by The Mills Brothers
- "Coney Island Whitefish" by Joan Jett & The Blackhearts
- "Coney Island's Finest" by Torae
- "Confession of a New Yorker (Hate – Love New York)" by Portia Nelson
- "Confession to a Park Avenue Mother" (from the revue Parade)
- "Conquering New York" (from the musical Wonderful Town)
- "Continental American" by Peter Allen
- "Conversation On Park Avenue" by Willie "The Lion" Smith
- "Conway" by Reel 2 Real
- "Cool Broadway" by Fantastic Johnny C
- "Copa (Cabanga)" by De La Soul
- "Copacabana (At the Copa)" by Barry Manilow
- "Cornelia Street" by Taylor Swift
- "A Corona Jam" by Ronnie G. & The S.M. Crew
- "Cotton Club Stomp" by Duke Ellington
- "Cotton Comes to Harlem" by Galt MacDermot & His Orchestra
- "Couldn't Get It Right" by Climax Blues Band
- "Country Boy & Bleeker Street" by H. P. Lovecraft
- "Country Boy Can Survive" by Hank Williams Jr
- "Country Living" by the Stylistics
- "Cousins", theme from The Patty Duke Show
- "Covered in Rain" by John Mayer
- "Crack in New York" by Culture
- "Cradle and All" by Ani Difranco
- "Crazy Cuts" by Grand Mixer DXT (known as Grandmixer D St when he recorded this)
- "Crazyman Dance" by George Michael
- "Crazy Gipsy (Spanish Harlem)" by Michel Laurent
- "Crime Saga" by Shabazz the Disciple
- "Crooklyn" by The Crooklyn Dodgers (Special Ed, Masta Ace, and Buckshot Shorty)
- "Crooklyn Anthem" by Armand Van Helden
- "Crooklyn Dub Syndicate" by Bill Laswell Meets Style Scott
- "Cross Bronx Dub" by King Tubby
- "Cross Bronx Expressway" by Lord Tariq & Peter Gunz
- "Crotona Park" by Dave Valentin
- "Crown Heights Justice" by The Mighty Sparrow
- "Cruise To Harlem" by David Cassidy
- "Crusin' The Hudson" by Bluemoon
- "Cruisin' the Streets" by Boys Town Gang
- "Cuckoo Cocoon" by Genesis
- "Cunailante Bella (Beautiful Coney Island" by Eduardo Migliaccio

== D ==
- "Da Bridge 2001" by Capone, Cormega, Marley Marl, MC Shan, Millenium Thug, Mobb Deep, Nas, Nature & Tragedy Khadafi
- "Da Bronx Cowboy" by King Vito & The Sea Hippies
- "Daddy Don't Live in That New York City No More" by Steely Dan
- "Daddy Howards in Queens" by Sort Sol
- "Daddy Rich in the Land of 1210" by 3rd Bass
- "The Dakota" by Christine Lavin
- "Dakota, Central Park West, 75em rue" by Jean Guidoni
- "Damn, Sam (I Love a Woman That Rains)" by Ryan Adams
- "Dance in a New York" by Tristan Palmer
- "Dance Yourself Dizzy" by Liquid Gold
- "Dancin' In The Sky (In New York City)" by J Michael Reed
- "Danger Zone" by Big L
- "Dangerous Sex" by Tackhead
- "Danke Schoen" by Wayne Newton
- "The Darlin' of New York" from Jimmy
- "Darryl & Joe (Krush Groove 3)" by Run-DMC
- "Date with Baby" by Brooklyn Funk Essentials
- "Daughters of the Soho Riots" by The National
- "The Day I Saw Bo Diddley in Washington Square" by Willie Nile
- "A Day in New York" (from the musical On the Town)
- "A Day In The City: Six Variations On A Theme" by Don Friedman Trio
- "A Day In The Life" by Diamond D & The Psychotic Neurotics
- "Daylight" by Matt and Kim
- "Daylight" by Taylor Swift
- "Days in New York" by Pearly Gates
- "Daytona 500" by The Game
- "Dazed In New York City" by Larry McNeely
- "De Panama A Nueva York" by Ruben Blades
- "Dear Old Broadway" by Gustave Kerker and R.H. Burnside
- "Dear Old Manhattan Isle" (music by Jean Schwartz; lyrics by William Jerome)
- "Debbie Loves Joey" by Helen Love
- "December I New York' by Gasolin'
- "Deja Vu (Uptown Baby)" by Lord Tariq and Peter Gunz
- "Deee-Lite Theme" by Deee-Lite
- "Deep Harlem" by Frankie Trumbauer
- "Deep in the Heart of Harlem" by Johnny Nash
- "Deeper Underground" by Jamiroquai
- "The Deer and the Park Avenue Lady" from the musical Very Warm for May
- "Definitely" by Big Daddy Kane
- "Delancey Street" by Dana Dane
- "'Dem Jive New Yorkers" by Babs Gonzales
- "Dem New York Dues" by Don Patterson
- "Derezzed" – Daft Punk
- "Descarga Broadway" by Broadway Orchestra
- "Desireless In NY" by Desireless
- "Desolation Row" by Bob Dylan
- "Destination Greenpoint" by The Fleshtones
- "Detachable Penis" by King Missile
- "Deux Hommes Dans Manhattan" by Christian Chevallier
- "Devil in a Sleeping Bag" by Willie Nelson
- "Devil's On The Loose (On 7th Avenue)" by Michael Kenny
- "Dial 7 (Axioms of Creamy Spies)/NY 21 Theme" by Digable Planets
- "Diamonds & Rust" by Joan Baez
- "Diamonds On The Soles Of Her Shoes" by Paul Simon
- "Diana (From N.Y.C.)" by Lee Moses
- "Dictys on Seventh Avenue" by Eubie Blake
- "Diet Mountain Dew" by Lana Del Rey
- "Digital" by Goldie featuring KRS-One
- "The Diminished Triangle – Three Part Composition" (including "Blues For Manhattan") by Gerald Wilson Orchestra
- "Dinner At The Ritz" by City Boy (Stork Club)
- "Dirty Apple" by Johnny Hammond
- "Dirty Boulevard" by Lou Reed
- "Dirty Cash (Money Talks)" by Adventures of Stevie V
- "Dirty Dancer" by Enrique Iglesias and Usher
- "Dirty Girls" by UK Subs
- "Disco Stomp" by Hamilton Bohannon
- "Disconnected" by 5 Seconds of Summer
- "DJ Spirit" by Chaka Demus
- "Dixie on My Mind" by Hank Williams Jr.
- "Do Like You Do in New York" by Boz Scaggs
- "Do the Right Thing" by Redhead Kingpin and the F.B.I.
- "Do You Feel It" by Joe Cuba
- "Do You Miss New York?" by Dave Frishberg
- "Dodgers' Fan Dance" by Harry James
- "Dodgers Were in Brooklyn" by The Great Divide
- "Does Ol' Broadway Ever Sleep" by Connie Francis
- "Does This Bus Stop at 82nd Street?" by Bruce Springsteen
- "Doin It" by LL Cool J
- "Doing the New York" (music by Ben Oakland; lyrics by J.P. Murray and Barry Trivers)
- "Dominick The Donkey" by Lou Monte
- "The Don" by Nas
- "Don Jose (From Far Rockaway)" (from the musical Wish You Were Here)
- "Donnellan Square" by Howard McGhee All Stars
- "Don't Be Upset" by Jeffrey Lewis
- "Don't Believe the Hype" by Public Enemy
- "Don't Blame It All on Broadway" (music by Bert Grant; lyrics by Henry Williams and Joe Young)
- "Don't Cry Dry Your Eyes" by Fugees
- "Don't Forget 127th Street," by Lee Adams and Charles Strouse from the musical Golden Boy
- "Don't Know" by Mario Winans
- "Don't Leave Me (Ne Me Quitte Pas)" by Regina Spektor
- "Don't Look Down" by Iggy Pop
- "Don't Look Down" by David Bowie
- "Don't Tell It" by James Brown
- "Doo Doo Doo Doo Doo (Heartbreaker)" by The Rolling Stones
- "Doo Wop in Harlem" by Prefab Sprout
- "Dorothy Is Harlem Bound" by Guy Davis
- "Double Dutch" by Malcolm McLaren
- "Down and Out in New York City" by James Brown
- "Down at the Gaiety Burlesque" (from Sugar Babies)
- "Down at the Village" from Greenwich Village Follies of 1928
- "Down Broadway" by Grachan Moncur III
- "Down Greenwich Village Way" music by Albert Von Tilzer; lyrics by Neville Fleeson
- "Down Here" by The Mountain Goats
- "Down Home New York" by Archie Shepp
- "Down in Chinatown" by Paul Young
- "Down in Gossip Row" by Ada Jones
- "Down In New York" by Chris Robison
- "Down In New York City" by The Natural Born Schmoozers, written by Jeff Alexander
- "Down in the Depths (on the Ninetieth Floor)" by Cole Porter
- "Down in the Village" by Curtis Knight
- "Down New York City" by Pat Kelly and Tapper Zukie
- "Down on the Lower East Side" by Justin Townes Earle
- "Down With The King" by Run-DMC
- "Downbeat After Dark" by Mike Carr
- "Downtown" by Tony Hatch, performed by Petula Clark (covered by Dolly Parton, Frank Sinatra, Emma Bunton, The B-52's and others)
- "Downtown Dirt" by Lou Reed
- "Downtown Swinga" by M.O.P.
- "Downtown Train" by Tom Waits
- "The Dream" by Higher
- "Dream Like New York" by Tyrone Wells
- "Dreams of New York City" by Goddo
- "Drift Study 14 VII 73 9:27:27-10:06:41 PM NYC" by La Monte Young
- "Driving Here On Broadway" by Traks
- "Drones Over Brooklyn" by El-P
- "Drop Me Off in Harlem" by Duke Ellington (covered by Louis Armstrong, Ella Fitzgerald, Dave Frishberg, Johnny Hodges, George Shearing, and many more)
- "Droppin' Science" by Marley Marl
- "Dropping Some NYC" by Blues Traveler
- "Drums Of New York" by Darude
- "The Duchess of Central Park" by Maurice Levi and J. Cheever Goodwin
- "Dude Descending a Staircase" by Apollo 440
- "D'Ya Like Scratchin'" by Malcolm McLaren
- "Dyckman House" by N.Y. House'n Authority

== E ==
- "Earth, Wind And Fire" by Big Daddy Kane
- "East 98 Street" by Man With No Name (Martin Freeland)
- "East 3rd Street" by Quicksand
- "East 34th Street" by Peter King
- "East 6th Street" by Ted Curson
- "East 70th Street" by Emil Viklický
- "East 9th Street" by Andrew Hill
- "East 12th Street Band" by The Zawinul Syndicate
- "East 98 Street" by Man With No Name
- "East Broadway Rundown" by Sonny Rollins
- "East Coast" by ASAP Ferg
- "East Coast, West Side" by Tony Scott
- "East Harlem" by Beirut
- "East Harlem Nostalgia" by Sonny Fortune Billy Harper Stanley Cowell Reggie Workman Billy Hart
- "The East Harlem Quickstep" by Snowboy & The Latin Section
- "East MC's (Made In Brooklyn)" by Masta Killa
- "East Of Brooklyn" by Hank Mobley
- "East River" by Brecker Brothers
- "East River" by Jeffrey Lewis
- "East River" by Picnic at the Whitehouse
- "East River Blue" by Spyro Gyra
- "East River Hoe Down (Here She Comes Now)" (from the musical revue Two on the Aisle)
- "East River Drive" by Grover Washington Jr
- "East River Drive" by Peter De Angelis
- "East River Drive" by Stanley Clarke
- "East River Rhapsody" from Songbook
- "Eastside" by Jim Jones
- "East Side Beat" by The Toasters
- "East Side Corridor" by Symphony Jazz Ensemble
- "East Side Down" by Mod Fun
- "East Side Drive" by Kenyon Hopkins
- "East Side Jive" by Big Rude Jake
- "East Side Of Heaven" by Bing Crosby
- "East Side Strut" by Deodato
- "East Side West Side" by Kenyon Hopkins
- "East Side West Side" by Phil Moore
- "East Side West Side" by Tony Yayo
- "East vs. West" by Chubb Rock
- "East Village Rocker With A Missed Connection" by Jason Trachtenburg
- "Easter Parade" composed by Irving Berlin, recorded by Judy Garland and others
- "Echoes of Harlem" by Duke Ellington
- "Egg Cream" by Lou Reed
- "Eine Nacht In New York City" by Howard Carpendale
- "Eine Reise Nach New York" by Mama Betty's Band
- "Eighth Avenue" (from Hellzapoppin' (1976) by Jule Styne)
- "Eighth Avenue" by Hospitality
- "El San Juanera" by Malcolm McLaren
- "Electric Relaxation" by A Tribe Called Quest
- "Electricity" by Dua Lipa
- "Elegance" by Jerry Herman
- "Ellis Island" by Bob Mintzer Big Band
- "Ellis Island" by Brian Auger
- "Ellis Island" by Marc Cohn
- "Ellis Island" by Mary Black
- "Ellis Island" by McKendree Spring
- "Ellis Island Blues" by Boo Hewerdine
- "El Numero Seis" by Ruben Blades
- "Eleanor Put Your Boots On" by Franz Ferdinand
- "Empire State" by Fleetwood Mac
- "Empire State Building" by Randy Newman
- "Empire State Express" by Son House
- "Empire State Halo" by Echo & the Bunnymen
- "Empire State Human" by Human League
- "Empire State Of Mind" by Bryan Ferry Orchestra
- "Empire State of Mind" by Jay-Z (ft. Alicia Keys), video shows Times Square and Tribeca
- "Empire State of Mind (Part II) Broken Down" by Alicia Keys
- "Empty Garden (Hey Hey Johnny)" by Elton John
- "E N Y House (East New York House)" by Masta Killa
- "Englishman In New York" by John Rocca
- "Englishman in New York" by Sting, said to be inspired by Quentin Crisp
- "An Englishman in New York" by Godley & Creme
- "En Why Cee" by Juganot ft. Joell Ortiz, Uncle Murda and Tess
- "Encore" by Cheryl Lynn
- "Entre Marianne Et Manhattan" by Michel Laurent
- "Episode Containing 3 Songs: N.Y. Op" by Asylum Choir
- "Escape From New York" by Geddes Axe
- "Escape From New York" by John Carpenter
- "Escape From New York" by Nasty Rox Inc (released on ZTT Records)
- "Escape To New York" by Secret Knowledge (featuring Kris Needs)
- "Espanharlem" by Ralph Flanagan
- "E.T.A. N.Y.C." by Mark Springer
- "Evening In Manhattan" by Eddie Heywood
- "Evening In New York" by JB Horns
- "Ever Since New York" by Harry Styles
- "Every Stop on the F Train" by Michael Gordon
- "Every Street's a Boulevard (In Old New York)" by Jule Styne / Bob Hilliard, From the Broadway musical "Hazel Flagg" (1953) covered by Dean Martin & Jerry Lewis & others
- "Everybody's Going to the Devil in New York" (music by Gus Edwards; lyrics by Edward Gardenier)
- "Everybody's Shakin' Hands On Broadway" by Luv'
- "Everyone's Coming To New York" by John Carpenter & Alan Howarth
- "Expression" by Salt N Pepa
- "Exterior Street" by Death Comet Crew
- "Extraño En New York" by Martina
- "Eyes of a New York Woman" by B. J. Thomas
- "Eyes Of Harlem" by Andrew Matheson

== F ==
- "F Train" by Babe the Blue Ox
- "Fabulous New York" by Jimmy Castor
- "Face Down at Folk City" by The Roches
- "Factory Girls" by The Destructors
- "Faded Flower of Broadway" by Willie Nile
- "Fairytale of New York" by The Pogues and Kirsty MacColl
- "Fakin NYC" by Scott & Charlene's Wedding
- "Fallin' Down" by Men at Work
- "Famous" by Skillet
- "Famous Blue Raincoat" by Leonard Cohen (covered by Tori Amos)
- "Famous Flower of Manhattan" by The Avett Brothers
- "Fantastic Voyage" by Coolio
- "Far Away" by Sleater-Kinney
- "Fare Thee Well To Harlem" by Jack Teagarden
- "Farewell to Harlem" by David McWilliams
- "A Farm Off Old Broadway" (from The Daughter of Rosie O'Grady)
- "Farmers" by LL Cool J
- "Farmers Blvd. (Our Anthem)" by LL Cool J
- "Fashion Crisis Hits New York" by The Frank and Walters
- "Father Demo Square" by Billy Hart
- "The Faucets are Dripping" by Malvina Reynolds
- "Fed Up" by House Of Pain
- "Feel The Music" by Guru
- "Females (Get On Up)" by Cookie Crew
- "Fell in Love with New York" by The Zolas
- "Fifth Avenue" by America
- "Fifth Avenue" by Daniel Wanrooy & Rene Havelaar
- "Fifth Avenue" by Gold Panda
- "Fifth Avenue" by Jae Mason
- "Fifth Avenue" by Mack Gordon
- "Fifth Avenue" music by Sigmund Romberg; lyrics by Harold Atteridge
- "Fifth Avenue Blue" by Peter Pringle
- "Fifth Avenue Breakdown" by Randy Stonehill
- "Fifth Avenue Breakdown" by Sounds Orchestral
- "Fifth Avenue New York City" by The Vandals
- "Fifth Avenue Rag" by David Chesky
- "Fifth Avenue Waltz" by Robert Mersey
- "Fifty Four" by Sea Level
- "Fifty Second Street" by Andy Kirk
- "Fight The Power (Flavor Flav Meets Spike Lee)" by Public Enemy
- "Fighting 69th" by Dropkick Murphys
- "Find It in New York" by Michelle Wright
- "Find Them In Brooklyn" by Lord Kitchener
- "Finger Back" by Vampire Weekend
- "Fiona's Song" by Black 47
- "Fire In A Brooklyn Theatre" by Randy Edelman
- "Fire Island" by Dante's Inferno
- "Fire Island" by Fire Island
- "Fire Island" by Fountains Of Wayne
- "Fire Island" by Mystic Moods Orchestra
- "Fire Island" by Real Time
- "Fire Island" by Secession
- "Fire Island" by the Village People
- "Fire Island Sand" by Junior Electronics
- "Fire Island, Saturday" by Don Crawford
- "First Day in New York" by Nitin Sawhney
- "First Day in New York" by Ollie Halsall
- "First Night in New York" by Claire Hamill
- "First Snow on Brooklyn" by Jethro Tull
- "First We Take Manhattan" by Leonard Cohen
- "Five Minutes Of Funk" by Whodini
- "Five Pointz" by Juan María Solare
- "Five Point Blues" by Bob Crosby
- "Five Spot After Dark" by The Jazztet
- "Five Spot Stomp" by Axel Zwingenberger
- "Flash's Theme Reprise (Victory Celebrations)" by Queen
- "Flatbush Avenue" by John Patitucci
- "Flatbush Ave." by Project
- "Flatbush Avenue" by "Weird Al" Yankovic
- "Flatbush Flanagan" by Harry James
- "Flatbush Style" by Velore & Double-O
- "Flatbush Waltz/Opus 57" by David Grisman Quartet
- "Flight" by Rare Bird
- "A Flower Grows In Brooklyn" by Positive K
- "Fly to New York" by Country Weather
- "Fly To New York" by Above & Beyond
- "Fly to New York City" by Jeane Manson
- "For Real" by Tricky
- "Fog on the Hudson (425 West 57th Street)" by Moondog
- "Folk Song" by Bongwater
- "Follow Instructions" by M.O.P.
- "For the Sight of Old Broadway" by Gustave Kerker and Harry B. Smith
- "For Your Money" by Daniel Merriweather
- "Fordham Road" by Lana Del Rey
- "Forever and a Day" by Fragma
- "Forever And A Day At Studio 54" by Randy Jones
- "Fork New York" by Everything Is Everything
- "Formal Night in Harlem" by Wingy Manone & his Orchestra
- "Fort Greene (S)Killz" by Dana Dane
- "Forty-Second Street Moon" (music by Sigmund Romberg; lyrics by Harold Atteridge and Clifford Grey)
- "Forty-Six West Fifty-Two" by Chu Berry
- "Fountain in Central Park" by Bill Snyder
- "Four O´Clock In New York" by The Lords
- "Four Superbowls, No Rings" by Such Gold
- "Fourteenth Street (I Can't Get Together)" by Ten Wheel Drive
- "Fourth Street Rag" by David Chesky
- "Fracas (New York Street Fight)" by Robert Mersey
- "Frank and Don, Howard, Too, Broadway Joe and You and Me" by Johnny Carver
- "Frank Mills" by James Rado/Gerome Ragni/Galt MacDermot, from the musical Hair
- "Freedom '91" by New Model Army
- "Freezing in New York" by Mighty Sparrow
- "A Frenchman In New York" by David Rose
- "Fresh Kills Landfill" by Spring Heel Jack
- "Friday Night in NY" by Space 2000
- "From Broadway To 7th Ave." by Victoria Spivey
- "From BX" by Tim Dog
- "From Cotton to Satin (From Birmingham to Manhattan)" by Johnny Paycheck
- "From Here To New York" by Too Short
- "From Here To N.Y. City" by Emergency
- "From New York to LA" by Patsy Gallant
- "From the Brooklyn Bridge" by Mark Germino
- "From the Plaza to Madison Square" from 'The Broadway Whirl' music: George Gershwin & Harry Tierney; lyrics: Richard Carle, Joseph McCarthy & John Henry Mears
- "From U.K. To B.K." by Smoothe Da Hustler
- "Fuck Nas" by Cormega
- "Fuck New York" by Slapshot
- "Fuego En El 23" by Fania All-Stars
- "Fugitives On Labour Day In Brooklyn" by Lord Brynner
- "Fuel" by Ani DiFranco
- "Fulton Street" by Eddie Gale
- "Fumigate Funky Broadway" by Chris Kenner
- "Funkin' for Jamaica (N.Y.)" by Tom Browne
- "Funky Apple" by Dave Matthews & The Electric Birds
- "Funky Girl On Motherless Broadway" by Melvin Van Peebles
- "Funky Westside" by Tone Lōc
- "Furlough In Harlem" by Hal McIntyre and His Orchestra
- "Furuhata's Theme – Ballad of the Big Apple by David Matthews
- "Furuhata's Theme – West 46th Street" by David Matthews
- "Future Prison" by DJ Marc La Cruz

== G ==
- "G Building" by M.O.P.
- "The Gaiety" (from the musical 'Skyscraper')
- "Gallows" by Shelby Merry
- "Game 6" by Yo La Tengo
- "The Game Get Live" by The Game featuring JT
- "Games We Play" by Chubb Rock
- "Garden in Manhattan" by Josiah Queen
- "Garden Party" by Rick Nelson (the 'Garden' is Madison Square Garden)
- "Gates of the West" by The Clash
- "Gay New York" from In Gay New York
- "Gayest Manhattan" by John Walter Bratton
- "The Geese Of Beverly Road" by The National
- "Generic New York City Woman" by The Blackjacks
- "Genesis 19:1–2" by The Mountain Goats
- "Genius Rap" by Dr. Jeckyll & Mr. Hyde
- "George Murphy" by Tom Lehrer
- "Get A Hold" by A Tribe Called Quest
- "Get-A-Way" by Maxx
- "Get By" by Talib Kweli (Bed-Stuy)
- "Get Down Stay Down" by Milk & Sugar
- "Get It Together" by Beastie Boys
- "Get Lucky" by Daft Punk
- "Get Me Back To The Apple" by George Gruntz Concert Jazz Band
- "Get On The Garden Freeway" by Allan Sherman
- "Get Together With Yourself" by Lotti Golden
- "Gettin' Lost Down On 8th Street" by Masayoshi Takanaka
- "GG Train" by Charles Mingus
- "The Ghetto" by Mark-Almond
- "Ghetto Dance" by Jah Thomas
- "Ghosts Of 42nd Street" by The Hellecasters
- "Gimme Gimme Good Lovin'" by Crazy Elephant
- "Gimme Your Money Please" by Bachman-Turner Overdrive
- "The Girl From East 9th Street" by Paul Desmond & Jim Hall
- "The Girl from Greenwich Village" by The Tradewinds
- "Girl from Harlem" by Bandwagon
- "Girl from New York" by Billy Nicholls
- "The Girl from New York City" by The Beach Boys
- "The Girl From N.Y.C." by Alec R. Costandinos
- "Girl from NYC (Named Julia)" by Of Montreal
- "Girl in New York" by Nessa Barrett
- "Girl in New York" by Simon Townshend
- "Girl (New York City)" by Taxxi
- "Girls On Broadway" by Tangerine Dream
- "Git On Up" by Fast Eddie and Sundance
- "Give It Back to the Indians" by Rodgers and Hart (from the musical Too Many Girls)
- "Give Me the Moon Over Brooklyn" by Guy Lombardo & His Royal Canadians
- "Give My Regards to Broadway" by George M. Cohan
- "Glad Tidings" by Van Morrison
- "Gloria's Theme From 'Butterfield 8'" by David Rose
- "Glory Days" by Cormega
- "The Glory That Was Eden" by The Coconuts
- "Go Ahead On (With That Funky Broadway Sound)" by Johnny "Man" Young
- "Go Bklyn" by Black Daniels
- "Go Brooklyn" by Hostyle
- "Go Brooklyn" by Stetsasonic
- "Go Brooklyn" by X-Crash
- "Go Cut Creator Go" by LL Cool J
- "Go Deh Yaka (Go To the Top)" by Monyaka
- "Go Go Harlem Baby" by Flat Duo Jets
- "Go Harlem" by Chick Webb and his Orchestra
- "Go On Girl" by Roxanne Shante
- "Go Queensbridge" by the Super Kids
- "Go to Work You Jerk" by Benny Bell
- "God of 42nd Street" by Saigon Kick
- "The Goddess of Rector's" (music by Gus Edwards; lyrics by Robert Bache Smith). Rector's is the famous New York restaurant.
- "Goin' to New York" by James Blood Ulmer
- "Goin' to New York" by Jimmy Reed
- "Goin' to Mintons" by Fats Navarro, Leo Parker, Miles Davis, Charlie Parker
- "Going Back to Brooklyn" by MC Lars
- "Going Back to Brooklyn" by Randy Brooks
- "Going Back to Coney Island" by Hylo Brown
- "Going Back to Harlem" by Mase
- "Going Back to New York City" by Joan Armatrading
- "Going, Going, Gone! (A Harlem Torch)" by Glen Gray and his Orchestra
- "Going To New York" by Buddy Johnson
- "Going To New York" by The Icebreakers
- "Going To New York" by Jimmy Reed
- "Going to Port Washington" by The Mountain Goats
- "Going to Queens" by The Mountain Goats
- "Gone Country" by Alan Jackson
- "Gone Gone to NYC" by Conor Oberst
- "Gone with the Wind (Sous Les Ponts De Brooklyn)" by Danyel Gérard
- "Good for My Money" by Baby Bash
- "Good-bye Broadway" (from the musical revue Miss 1917)
- "Goodbye Broadway, Hello France" (from the musical revue The Passing Show)
- "Goodbye, Greenwich Village" by Tommy Scott
- "Goodbye Manhattan " by Pieces of a Dream
- "Goodbye My Coney Island Baby" by Somethin' Smith and the Redheads
- "Goodbye New York" by Johnny Dorelli
- "Goodbye New York" by Milk and Honey
- "Goodbye, New York!" by Jack Nitzsche and Richard Hazard
- "Good-Bye, Poor Old Manhattan" by E. Ray Goetz and Malvin M. Franklin
- "Goodbye Sweet Old Manhattan Isle" by William Jerome
- "Goodbye To Broadway" by Galt MacDermot & Gerome Ragni
- "Good Fortune" by PJ Harvey
- "Good Old Harlem Town" by Wilmoth Houdini
- "Good Old New York" by Jelly Roll Morton
- "Good to Go" by Elliott Smith
- "Goodnight Ladies (Lullaby of Broadway)" by Bram Tchaikovsky
- "Goodnight, New York" by Christine Lavin
- "Gossip In Brooklyn" by Gladstone Anderson
- "Got My Mojo Workin'" by Jimmy Smith
- "Got to Get Out of New York" by Tom Scott
- "Gotham" by Animal Collective
- "Gotham City" by Landscape
- "Gotham City" by Nelson Riddle
- "Gotham City" by R. Kelly
- "Gotham City Serenade" by Big Rude Jake
- "Gotham Serenade" by Phil Woods Quintet
- "Gotta Be...Movin' On Up" by PM Dawn
- "Gotta Have It" by Jay-Z
- "Grab A Slice NYC" by The Brooklyn Pizzaiolos, written by Jeff Alexander
- "Gramercy Park" by Grover Washington Jr
- "Gramercy Park Hotel" by Ben Lee
- "Gramercy Park Hotel" by Eberhard Schoener
- "Gramercy Park Hotel" by Edwin McCain
- "Gramercy Vaudeville" by David Mead
- "Grand Army Plaza" by Department of Eagles
- "Grand Central" by John Coltrane
- "Grand Central" by Patrick Doyle
- "Grand Central Getaway" by Tommy Dorsey
- "Grand Central Morning" by David Chesky
- "Grand Central Shuttle" by Johnny Griffith Inc
- "Grand Central Station" by Fontane Sisters
- "Grand Central Station" by John Coltrane
- "Grand Central Station" by Mary Chapin Carpenter
- "Grand Central Station, March 18, 1977" by Steve Forbert
- "The Grand Central Symphony" by Lud Gluskin
- "Grand Maman, C'Est New York" by Charles Trenet
- "Grand Street" by Shirley Scott & Stanley Turrentine
- "Great Jones Street" by Luna
- "Great Jones Street" by Phantom Five
- "The Great New York Police" by George M. Cohan
- "The Great Train Robbery" by Black Uhuru
- "The Great White Easiest Way" by Victor Herbert and Glen MacDonough
- "The Great White Way" by Ludwig Englander; lyrics by J. Clarence Harvey and Sydney Rosenfeld
- "The Great White Way" (music by Raymond Hubbell; lyrics by Joseph Herbert)
- "Great White Way Blues" by Original Memphis Five
- "The Greater Manhattan Love Song" by Patrick Sky
- "Green Acres" by Eddie Albert and Eva Gabor
- "Green Grass Of Shea" by New York Mets
- "Greenwich Village" (music by Jerome Kern, a book by Guy Bolton and P. G. Wodehouse and lyrics by Wodehouse)
- "Greenwich Village Belle" music by Sigmund Romberg; lyrics by Charles Manning and Matthew C. Woodward
- "Greenwich Village Folk Song Salesman" by Nancy Sinatra & Lee Hazlewood
- "Greenwich Village Nights" (music by Louis Hirsch; lyrics by Irving Caesar and John Murray Anderson)
- "Greenwich Village Rumble" by Elmer Bernstein
- "Groovin' at the Apollo" by Elephant Band
- "Groovin' At The Downbeat" by Mike Carr
- "Groovy Gotham" by Axel Zwingenberger
- "Ground Zero" by Elliott Murphy
- "Ground Zero Brooklyn" by Carnivore
- "Growing Old on Bleecker Street" by AJR
- "Gun Hill Road" by Gunhill Road
- "Gus: The Polar Bear from Central Park" by The Tragically Hip
- "Guys Ain't Nothing But Trouble" by DJ Jazzy Jeff & The Fresh Prince featuring Ice Cream T
- "Gypsy Cab" by Steve Conte & The Crazy Truth

== H ==
- "A Haircut In Manhattan" by Robb Johnson
- "Hacia Nueva York' by Micky
- "Half Moon on the Hudson" by Harold Spina and Walter Bullock
- "Halloween Parade" by Lou Reed
- "Handclap" by Bossman
- "Handel In Harlem" by Scott Wood and His Six Swingers
- "The Hands That Built America" by U2
- "Hang Together" by Odyssey
- "Hang Up Your Hat on Broadway" by Frank Fay
- "Hanging Out" by UTFO
- "Happy Days In New York City" by Lobo
- "The (Happy) Heaven of Harlem" (from the musical comedy Fifty Million Frenchmen)
- "Hard Knock Life" by Jay-Z
- "Hard Times in New York Town" by Bob Dylan
- "Hard to Live (in the City)" by Albert Hammond Jr.
- "Harlem" by Glassjaw
- "Harlem" by Baron Longfellow
- "Harlem" by Bennie Moten
- "Harlem" by Bill Withers
- "Harlem" by Charles Mingus
- "Harlem" by Duke Ellington
- "Harlem" by Edwin Starr
- "Harlem" by Emmanuel Abdul-Rahim
- "Harlem" by Grand Slam
- "Harlem" by Ian Moore
- "Harlem" by Jim Jones
- "Harlem" by Michel Laurent
- "Harlem" by New Politics
- "Harlem" by Paul Bley
- "Harlem" by Rare Bird
- "Harlem" by Scott Wood And His Six Swingers
- "Harlem" by Suicide
- "Harlem-10027-" by Andy Kim
- "Harlem After Midnight" by Mills Blue Rhythm Band
- "Harlem Air Shaft" by Duke Ellington
- "Harlem Alley Cats" by Wilmoth Houdini
- "Harlem And 42nd Street" by Deep Sensation
- "Harlem Apartment" by Lennie Niehaus Quintet
- "Harlem Blues" by Nat 'King' Cole
- "Harlem Blues" by Teena Marie
- "Harlem Bound" by Gibson Brothers
- "Harlem Bound" by Memphis Slim
- "Harlem Boys" by Sonny Rollins
- "Harlem Brothers" by The 45 King
- "Harlem Brown" by Redhead Kingpin and the F.B.I.
- "The Harlem Buck Strut Dance" by Les McCann
- "Harlem Butterfly" by Johnny Mercer
- "Harlem By Day" by Galt MacDermot
- "Harlem Camp Meeting" by Cab Calloway
- "Harlem Can't Be In Heaven" by Smokey Hogg
- "Harlem Choc'late Babies On Parade" by James P. Johnson
- "Harlem Clavinette" by Bobby Womack & JJ Johnson
- "The Harlem Clown" by Our Brother's Keeper
- "Harlem Congo" by Chick Webb
- "Harlem Country Girl" by Olu Dara
- "Harlem Dancer" by Shanghai
- "Harlem Dawn" by Donny Hathaway
- "Harlem Desire" by London Boys
- "Harlem Drag" by Charlie Johnson
- "Harlem Dream" by Peter Doyle
- "Harlem Dreams" by Badder Than Evil
- "Harlem Drive" by Quincy Jones
- "Harlem Express" by George Williams
- "Harlem Fever" by Armando Sciascia
- "Harlem Flat Blues" by Duke Ellington
- "Harlem Folk Dance" by Stan Kenton
- "Harlem Fuss" by Fats Waller (covered by Eddie Condon)
- "Harlem Girl" by Southern Comfort
- "Harlem Heat" by Mills Blue Rhythm Band
- "Harlem Heaven" by The Rance Allen Group
- "Harlem Holiday" by Cab Calloway
- "Harlem Hospitality" by Cab Calloway
- "Harlem Hotcha" by James P Johnson
- "Harlem Hunch" by Slim Gaillard
- "Harlem Hustle" by Shampoo
- "Harlem In Hamburg" by James Booker
- "Harlem In My Heart" by Elisabeth Welch
- "Harlem In White" by Mike Steïphenson
- "Harlem Jamboree" by Rosetta Howard With The Harlem Hamfats
- "Harlem Joys" by Willie "The Lion" Smith
- "Harlem Junction" by Tony Pastor
- "Harlem Kids" by Chill Will
- "Harlem Lady" by David McWilliams
- "Harlem Lady" by Michael Holm
- "Harlem Lament" by Earl Hines
- "Harlem Library" by Kenny Lynch
- "Harlem Love Theme" by Bobby Womack & JJ Johnson
- "Harlem Lullaby" composed by Margod Millhane and Willard Robison, performed by Mildred Bailey, The Dorsey Brothers, and Junior Mance
- "Harlem Madness" by Fletcher Henderson
- "Harlem Mambo" by Dave Barbour
- "The Harlem Man" by Burl Ives
- "Harlem Melody" by Steve Douglas
- "Harlem Nightclub" (from Ragtime)
- "Harlem Nightmare" by Tito Rodriguez
- "Harlem Nights" by Alcazar
- "Harlem Nights" by Earle Hagen
- "Harlem Nights (Opening Theme)" by Herbie Hancock
- "Harlem Nights" by Simon Phillips
- "Harlem Nocturne" by Earle Hagen (covered by Ray Anthony, Earl Bostic, Martin Denny, Les Elgart, Esquivel, Maynard Ferguson, Stan Kenton, Johnny Otis, Mel Tormé and many more)
- "Harlem On My Mind" by Alex Bugnon
- "Harlem On My Mind" by Irving Berlin
- "Harlem On Parade" composed by Benny Carter and Ray Evans, performed by Gene Krupa & his Orchestra, Anita O'Day, and Roy Eldridge
- "Harlem On Saturday Night" by Lil Hardin Armstrong
- "Harlem Parade" by Wild Bill Moore
- "Harlem Pop Corn Man" by Wilmoth Houdini
- "Harlem Rag" by Tom Turpin
- "Harlem Rain" by Bobby Bryant
- "Harlem Rain" by Richie Sambora
- "Harlem Reggae" by John Ozila
- "Harlem Rhythm Dance" by Claude Hopkins And His Orchestra
- "Harlem River" by Kevin Morby
- "Harlem River Blues" by Justin Townes Earle
- "Harlem River Chanty" by George Gershwin & Ira Gershwin
- "Harlem River Drive" by Bobbi Humphrey
- "Harlem River Drive (Theme Song)" by Harlem River Drive
- "Harlem River Drive" by Matt Marshak
- "Harlem River Quiver" by Duke Ellington
- "Harlem Rock" by Don Gardner & Dee Dee Ford
- "Harlem Rock" by Patty Pravo
- "Harlem Rose" by Con Conrad and Gladys Rogers
- "Harlem Rosewood" by Trent Dabbs
- "Harlem Roulette" by The Mountain Goats
- "Harlem Round" by Zenith Hot Stompers
- "Harlem Rug Cutter" by Sonny Thompson
- "Harlem Rumble" by Frank Foster
- "Harlem Samba" by Bud Shank
- "Harlem Samba" by Dizzy Gillespie
- "Harlem Sandman" by Dinning Sisters
- "Harlem Serenade" (from Show Girl)
- "Harlem Session" by Nuggets
- "Harlem Shake" by Azealia Banks
- "Harlem Shake" by Baauer
- "Harlem Shout" by Eddie Durham and Jimmie Lunceford
- "Harlem Shuffle" by Bob & Earl (covered by The Rolling Stones)
- "The Harlem Song" by Country Joe and the Fish
- "Harlem Speaks" by Duke Ellington
- "Harlem Streets" by Immortal Technique
- "Harlem Stroll" by Snake Davis
- "The Harlem Strut" by James P. Johnson
- "Halem Sweet Harlem" (from the musical revue Bubbling Brown Sugar)
- "Harlem Swing" by Reg Owen
- "Harlem Symphony" by James P. Johnson
- "The Harlem Tango" by The Orchids
- "Harlem Time" (from the musical revue Bubbling Brown Sugar)
- "Harlem Town" by Pino Prssti
- "Harlem Twist (East St. Louis Toodle-oo)" by Duke Ellington
- "The Harlem Twister (The New Sensation)" by Teddy Hill
- "Harlem (Uptown)" by Mobstyle
- "Harlem Waltz" by Mike Carr Quartet
- "Harlem Woogie" by James P. Johnson
- "Harlem World Rappers" by Dr. Jeckyll & Mr. Hyde
- "Harlem Yank" by Timmie Rogers
- "Harlem Yodel" by Robert Wright and George Forrest
- "Harlemania" (from Ever Green)
- "Harlem's Araby" by Metropolitan Dance Players (featuring Harry Yerkes)
- "Harlem's Manhattan" by Ornette Coleman
- "Harlem's Poppin'" by Noble Sissle* "Harlemania" by Duke Ellington
- "Harmony in Harlem" by Charlie Barnet* "Have You Forgotten?" by Darryl Worley
- "Have Yourself A Merry Little Christmas" (original version) by Hugh Martin and Ralph Blane
- "Head Rush on Lafayette" by David Holmes
- "Heading For Harlem" by Nathaniel Shilkret* "Headin' For New York City" by Bobby Gosh
- "Heading Back to New York City" by Joan Armatrading
- "Headset" by Avril Lavigne
- "Healing Broadway" by Greg Hunter
- "A Heart in New York" by Gallagher and Lyle (covered by Art Garfunkel)
- "The Heart Of Hollis" by Spyder-D
- "Heart Of New York" by Alex Bugnon
- "The Heart of Rock & Roll" by Huey Lewis and the News
- "Heartbeat" by KRS-One
- "Heartbeat of the City" by The System
- "Heartbreaker" by The Rolling Stones
- "The Heat In Harlem" by Graham Parker & the Rumour
- "Heat Wave Hits New York" by Irving Berlin
- "Heavens in New York" by Wyclef Jean
- "Helen of Troy, New York" (by Bert Kalmar and Harry Ruby)
- "Hell Up In Harlem" by Edwin Starr
- "Hell in New York" by Slaughter & The Dogs
- "Hello Broadway" by Four Tops
- "Hello Brooklyn" by All Time Low
- "Hello Brooklyn" by Beastie Boys
- "Hello Brooklyn 2.0" by Jay-Z featuring Lil Wayne
- "Hello Darling" by Tippa Irie
- "Hello, Dolly!" by Jerry Herman (about 14th Street)
- "Hello New York" by Adrian Gurvitz
- "Hello New York" by Ernest Pike
- "Hello New York" by Silverhead
- "A Helluva Town" by George Russell
- "Henry Hannah's 42nd Street Parking Lot" by Long John Baldry
- "Here Come the Yankees", by Bob Bundin and Lou Stallman
- "Here I Come" by Barrington Levy
- "Here We Go" by C & C Music Factory featuring Freedom Williams
- "Here's Looking at You, Kid" by The Gaslight Anthem
- "He's a Latin from Staten Island" by Charlie Barnet
- "Hey! Brooklyn" by Mrozinski
- "Hey Eugene!" by Pink Martini
- "Hey, Manhattan" by Prefab Sprout
- "Hey, St. Peter" by Flash and the Pan
- "Hey There Delilah" by Plain White T's
- "High Hawk Season" by The Mountain Goats
- "High School USA (New York City Area)" by Tommy Facenda
- "High Tide-Manhattan Ecstasy by Terumasa Hino
- "High Up in Harlem" (from the musical Very Warm for May)
- "Highway Star" by Deep Purple
- "Hillbilly from Tenth Avenue" by Artie Shaw
- "The Hippodrome Street Parade" by Raymond Hubbell and John L. Golden
- "The Hippy from New York City" by David Peel
- "A History Of New York" by Walter Huston
- "Hit 'Em Up" by 2Pac
- "Hit 'Em Wit' Da Hee" (Remix) by Missy Elliott
- "Hit Music" by Pet Shop Boys
- "Hitch Hiking Down Broadway" by The Escorts
- "Ho Hey" by The Lumineers
- "Hobo On Park Avenue" by Ina Ray Hutton
- "Hold On" by Lou Reed
- "Hold Tight, Hold Tight" by Andrews Sisters
- "Holiday in Harlem" by Chick Webb (featuring Ella Fitzgerald)
- "Holiday Rap" by MC Miker G & DJ Sven
- "Holland Tunnel" by I Am the World Trade Center
- "Holland Tunnel" by Kenyon Hopkins
- "Hollis Crew" by Run DMC
- "Hollis Rock" by Spyder C
- "Hollis to Hollywood" by LL Cool J
- "Hollywood" by Boz Scaggs
- "Hollywood, Park Avenue and Broadway" music by Ray Henderson; lyrics by Lew Brown
- "Home Of The Mets" by Tim McCabe
- "Home Sweet Home" by M.O.P.
- "Home To Harlem" music by Ray Henderson; lyrics by Lew Brown
- "Honeymoon In New York" by Heaven 17
- "Honky Tonk Women" by The Rolling Stones
- "Hooked on Broadway" by Larry Elgart
- "Hoola From Coney Isle" by Henry Creamer and Turner Layton
- "Horny '98" by Hot 'n' Juicy produced by Mousse T.
- "hornylovesickness" by Girl in Red
- "Horse and Carriage in Central Park" by Richard Clayderman
- "A Hot Day in Harlem" by the Rimshots
- "Hot in Harlem" by Tiny Grimes
- "Hot in the City" by Billy Idol
- "Hot Night in New York City" by Bonnie Koloc
- "Hot Pants" by James Brown
- "Hot Stuff" by The Rolling Stones
- "Hot Time in Harlem" by Gwen Guthrie
- "Hotel Chelsea Nights" by Ryan Adams
- "Hotel Roosevelt" by Augustana
- "The Hothouse on Broadway" by Bernard Rolt and C. M. S. McLellan
- "Hot'lanta" by 38 Special
- "House in Central Park" by Ten Wheel Drive
- "House in the Hills" by Wiz Khalifa
- "The House On Lefferts Blvd." by Yosi Levy And David Liebman
- "Houston Street" by Jack Hardy
- "Houston Street" by Jake Holmes
- "Houston Street Thursday Afternoon" by Bobby Hutcherson
- "Hover" by Rhett Miller
- "How About You?" composed by Ralph Freed and Burton Lane, performed by Chet Baker, Rosemary Clooney, Tommy Dorsey, Bill Evans, Judy Garland, Oscar Peterson, Frank Sinatra, Maxine Sullivan, and many more
- "How Do You Get to Carnegie Hall?" by Sparks
- "How D'Ye Do Fifth Avenue?" music by Raymond Hubbell; lyrics by John Golden
- "How Far Am I From New York City" by Ollie Nightingale
- "Howard Beach" by Biohazard
- "Howdy Broadway (Howdy to Broadway)" (from the musical comedy Peggy-Ann)
- "Hudson" by Girlyman
- "Hudson" by Vampire Weekend
- "The Hudson" by Dar Williams
- "Hudson Duster" music by Ray Henderson; lyrics by Buddy DeSylva and Lew Brown
- "Hudson Parkway (West Side Highway)" by Stanley Turrentine
- "Hudson River Blues" by Charles La Verne
- "Hudson River High" by Black Science Orchestra
- "Hudson River Nights" by Kim Waters
- "Hudson Street" by Agnelli and Nelson
- "Human Nature" by Michael Jackson
- "Hunter's Point" by Yellowjackets
- "Hurricane" by Halsey
- "Hypnotize" by Notorious B.I.G.

== I ==
- "I-95" by John Waite
- "I Am 40: Memories of West St. And Lepke" by They Might Be Giants
- "I Am Down" by Salt-n-Pepa
- "I Am, I Said" by Neil Diamond
- "I Am New York" by MC New York
- "I Am New Yorker" by Lee "Scratch" Perry
- "I Am Ready" by Jaden Smith
- "I See You" by Leona Lewis
- "I Am the Way (New York Town)" by Loudon Wainwright III
- "(I Am) The Wizard of Wall Street" by Raymond Hubbell, Clara Driscoll and Robert Bache Smith
- "I And Love and You" by The Avett Brothers
- "I Beg Your Pardon Dear Old Broadway" by Irving Berlin
- "I Called U" by Lil Louis
- "I Can Do Without Broadway (I Know Darn Well I Can Do Without Broadway)" by Jimmy Durante
- "I Can't Live Without My Radio" by LL Cool J
- "I Can't Make a Mistake" by MC Lyte
- "I Can't See New York" by Tori Amos
- "I Did the Funky Broadway" by Billy Emerson
- "I Didn't Come to New York to Meet a Guy from My Home Town" by Michele Lee
- "I Didn't Sing (In the New York Subway)" by Dennis Lambert
- "I Do the Rock" by Tim Curry
- "I Dreamt I Dwelt in Harlem" by Glenn Miller & his Orchestra
- "I Feel Safe in New York City" by AC/DC
- "I Found Lovin'" by Steve Walsh
- "I Got an Uncle in Harlem" by Sweet Substitute
- "I Got My Job Through The New York Times" by The Stepping Stones (aka The Cookies)
- "I Gotcha Back" by GZA
- "I Guess the Lord Must Be in New York City" by Harry Nilsson (covered by Sinéad O'Connor)
- "I Happen to Like New York" by Cole Porter
- "I Hate New York" by Blue Mercedes
- "I Just Wanna Have Something to Do" by Ramones
- "I Know You Got Soul" by Eric B & Rakim
- "I Left My Heart In San Francisco" by Tony Bennett
- "I Left My Wallet in El Segundo" by A Tribe Called Quest
- "I Like New York" music by James W. Tate; lyrics by John Golden
- "I Like Me Better" by Lauv
- "I Live For New York City" by Freda Payne
- "I Love A New Yorker" (from My Blue Heaven)
- "I Love America" by Patrick Juvet
- "I Love Harlem" by Asher Roth and Jim Jones
- "I Love Livin' in the City" by Fun Lovin' Criminals
- "I Love N.Y." by 1000 Clowns
- "I Love N.Y." by Capricorn
- "I Love N.Y." by Dead Bars
- "I Love N.Y." by Lazyboy
- "I Love NYC" by Andrew W.K.
- "I Love New York" by Abbe Lane
- "I Love New York" by Casiopea
- "I Love New York" by David Peel
- "I Love New York" by Madonna
- "I Love New York" by Selfish Cunt
- "I Love New York" by Steve Karmen
- "I Love New York" by Yellowman
- "I Love New York/New York New York" by Glee
- "I Love the Night in New York City" by Nightlife Unlimited
- "I Met My Baby in Macy's" by Tommy Dorsey
- "I Remember Brooklyn" by Tony Visconti
- "I Remember Coney Island" by The Lounge Lizards
- "I Remember Harlem" by Roy Eldridge
- "I Remember New York" by Hank Marr Quartette
- "I Run New York" by 50 Cent featuring Tony Yayo
- "I Run NY" by The Lonely Island featuring Billie Joe Armstrong
- "I Used to Be a Brooklyn Dodger" by Dion
- "I Wanna Be a NY Ranger" by The Misfits
- "I Wanna Go to New York" by Blue
- "I Want to Go Back to New York" by William Becker, Aaron Hoffman and Jean C. Havez
- "I Want to Go to Coney Island with My Grandma" by Artie Kaplan
- "I Went to the Village" by Joe Reisman
- "I Went Walking" by Rank and File
- "I Woke Up in a Car" by Something Corporate
- "I Wouldn't Live in New York City (If They Gave Me the Whole Damn Town)" by Buck Owens
- "Ich war noch niemals in New York" by Udo Jürgens
- "Idiot Kings" by Soul Coughing
- "If a Table at Rector's Could Talk" by (Raymond Hubbell and Will D. Cobb) (Rector's was a famous early 20th-century New York restaurant)
- "If I Can't" by 50 Cent
- "If You Wanna Go to New York City" by Marty Butler
- "Ikey And Mikey" by Benny Bell
- "Il Vagabondo Di Harlem" by Strana Societa
- "I'll Take New York" by Tom Waits
- "I'll Take Us Home" by Matt and Kim
- "I'll Sink Manhattan" by They Might Be Giants
- "Illume" by Fleetwood Mac
- "I'm a Big Girl Now" by Sammy Kaye
- "I'm a Knicks Fan" by Jesse Jaymes
- "I'm a Vamp from East Broadway (by Irving Berlin, Bert Kalmar and Harry Ruby)
- "I'm a Wonderful Thing, Baby" by Kid Creole and the Coconuts (mentions Southern Boulevard)
- "I'm Bad" by LL Cool J
- "I'm From NY" by Nifty (an alias of Basement Jaxx)
- "I'm Gonna Be a Country Girl Again" by Buffy Sainte-Marie
- "I'm in Bryant Park" by Bill Wurtz
- "I'm Waiting for the Man" by The Velvet Underground
- "I'm Real" by James Brown
- "I'm Singing Broadway" by Bette Midler
- "Imp on Broadway" by Ronald Binge
- "Impressions of Harlem" by Roy Fox
- "Impressions of New York" by Rolf Kühn Joachim Kühn Quartet
- "In a New York Minute" by Ronnie McDowell
- "In Brooklyn" by Al Stewart
- "In Central Park" by Maurice Levi and J. Cheever Goodwin
- "In Da Hood" by 50 Cent
- "In Greenwich Village" by Peter Gallway
- "In Little Old New York" music by Jean Schwartz; lyrics by Harold Atteridge
- "In New York" by Ethan Gold
- "In New York" by Heath Brothers
- "In New York" by Mr Thing & The Professional Human Beings
- "In New York" by Passion
- "In New York" by Yiddish Soul Brother Amnon
- "In New York City" by Up with People
- "In New York the Only Sin Is Being Timid" (from the musical Onward Victoria)
- "In Old New York" by Victor Herbert
- "In Spanish Harlem" by Bell & James
- "In Spanish Harlem" by Chris Stamey
- "In the Cage" by Genesis
- "In the City" by Joe Walsh (from the movie The Warriors)
- "In the Heights by Lin-Manuel Miranda (from the musical In the Heights)
- "In the Dark" by Silverstein
- "In the Evening" by Sheryl Lee Ralph
- "In the Flesh" by Blondie
- "In the Mood Again" by Elvis Costello
- "In the RaiNY City" by Tajna Tanovic
- "In Those Good Old Bowery Days" by Irving Berlin
- "Incident in Brooklyn" by Rescue Party
- "Incident on 57th Street" by Bruce Springsteen
- "Incident On South Street" by The Lounge Lizards
- "The Incumbent" by Soul Coughing
- "Inna City Mama" by Neneh Cherry
- "Inner Pigeon" by The Brooklyn Pizzaiolos, written by Jeff Alexander
- "Interstate 78" by Fused
- "Into Brooklyn, Early in the Morning" by The Innocence Mission
- "Into the Fire" by Bruce Springsteen
- "Into the Hollywood Groove (Passengerz Mix)" by Madonna & Missy Elliott
- "The Invisible Venus of New York City" by Bill Nelson
- "Iron God Chamber" by Masta Killa (Brownsville, Bed-Stuy)
- "Is It Raining in New York City?" by Cashman & West
- "Is New York City Your Home?" by Gene Cotton
- "Isle of Manhattan" by Spacehog
- "Island Girl" by Elton John
- "Istanbul (Not Constantinople)" by Frankie Vaughan
- "It Ain't All Hugs and Handshakes" by Crime in Stereo
- "It Ain't New York" by The Singing MC Breeze & Hand Master Flash
- "It's All Yours" by MC Lyte
- "Its Always You and Me" by Neal Coomer and Kathryn Raio
- "It's Been a Long, Long Time" by Kitty Kallen
- "It Is Jazz" by Tingo Tango
- "It Never Rains" by Dire Straits
- "It Never Rains" by Tyga
- "It Rains in New York Too" by Pete Miser
- "It Won't Be The Same Old Broadway" music by Albert W. Brown and Jean Schwartz; lyrics by Harold Atteridge
- "Italian from New York" by Chicago
- "It's Going On in New York" by Pure
- "It's a Great Day for the Irish" by Roger Edens
- "It's a Long Way from Brooklyn" by Joseph Brooks & Casey Kvitka Cisyk
- "It's a Long Way to Dear Old Broadway" by Arthur Fields
- "It's a Long Way To Tiffany's" music by Harry Carroll; lyrics by Joseph McCarthy
- "It's a Party" by Bounty Killer
- "It's a Windy Day at the Battery" (from Maytime)
- "It's Christmas in New York" by Loa Falkman
- "It's Getting Dark on Old Broadway" by Louis Hirsch
- "It's Great To Be Back On Broadway" by Jule Styne and Bob Merrill
- "(It's) New York Town for Mine" by Albert Von Tilzer, Loney Haskell and Willard Holcomb
- "It's Nice to go Trav'ling" by Sammy Cahn and Jimmy Van Heusen
- "It's Rough in Harlem" by Team Machine
- "It's Still the Same Old Broadway" by Jimmy Durante
- "It's Tricky" by Run DMC
- "It's Quiet Uptown" by Lin-Manuel Miranda (from the musical "Hamilton")
- "I've Been to Harlem" by Wally Whyton
- "I've Been Watching the New York Dolls" by The Destructors
- "I've Got a Crush on New York Town" by Connie Francis
- "I've Got New York" by The 6ths
- "I've Gotta Get Back to New York" by Rodgers and Hart
- "I've Said Goodbye to Broadway" by Dave Stamper

== J ==
- "Jack The Ripper" by LL Cool J
- "Jah Woosh In New York" by Jah Woosh
- "J'ai rêvé New York" by Yves Simon
- "Jam In Brooklyn" by Ed Watson Brass Circle
- "Jamaica Avenue" by Bob Sinclar
- "Jamaica Avenue" by Chris Gantry
- "Jamaica Avenue" by Simply Red
- "Jamaican in New York" by Shinehead
- "Jammin'" by Bob Marley & MC Lyte
- "Jammin' in Manhattan" by Jeff Tyzik
- "Janine" by Soul Coughing
- "Jazz A New York" by Caravelli
- "The Jazz at Waldo's" by Elmer Bernstein
- "Jazz Corner Of The World" by Quincy Jones
- "Jazz Music" by Gang Starr
- "Jazz Rap" by Kim Carnegie
- "Jazzy Sensation" by Afrika
- "Jazz Thing" by Gang Starr
- "Je voudrais voir New York" by Daniel Lavoie
- "The Jean Genie" by David Bowie
- "Jenny from the Block" by Jennifer Lopez featuring Jadakiss & Styles P. (from The Bronx!)
- "A Jersey Tomato And An Idaho Potato On A New York Central Train" by Jimmy Saunders (singer with Harry James and his Orchestra)
- "Jimbrowski" by Jungle Brothers
- "JFK to LAX" by Gang Starr
- "Jo'burg – New York" by Johnny Dyani Quartet
- "Joey" by Bob Dylan
- "John Henry In Manhattan" by John McEuen
- "Johnny Go to New York" by Bedouin Soundclash
- "Johnny Goes To Rock New York" by Rhythmwave Crew
- "Johnny's Got A Date With A Gal In New York" by Kate Smith
- "The Joint Is Jumpin'" by Fats Waller
- "The Joint Is Really Jumping Down at Carnegie Hall" by Judy Garland
- "Jojo" by Boz Scaggs
- "Jolly Green Giant & The Statue Of Liberty" by Elliott Randall
- "Jolly Jingles" by Benny Bell
- "Jonathan" by Fiona Apple
- "Josephine Superstar – Medley: Saint Louis/Broadway/Star Of Paris" by Phylicia Allen
- "Joyce From The Bronx" by David Matthews
- "Judy Teen" by Steve Harley
- "Juice Crew Dis" by Cool C
- "Juicy" by Notorious B.I.G.
- "Juilliard" by Dario Marianelli
- "Jumpin' At 57th" by Sammy Price
- "Jumpin' At The Apollo" by Illinois Jacquet
- "Jumpin' at the Woodside" by Count Basie
- "Jumpin' At Zanzibar" by Milt Buckner
- "Jungle" by A Boogie wit da Hoodie
- "Jungle Brother" by Jungle Brothers
- "Jungle Harlem" by Mel Turner (Jimmy James Ross)
- "Jungleland" by Bruce Springsteen
- "The Jungle Line" by Joni Mitchell
- "Just Another Night (In New York City)" by The Star Sisters
- "Just Like Tom Thumb's Blues" by Bob Dylan
- "Just Over the Brooklyn Bridge" by Art Garfunkel

== K ==
- "Keep New York Clean" by Aleke Kanonu
- "Keepin' The Faith" by De La Soul
- "Kennedy Airport" by Sheila B Devotion
- "Kennedy Airport" by Shigeru Suzuki
- "The Key to Gramercy Park" by Deadsy
- "Keyornew" by Mathieu Boogaerts
- "Kickin' 4 Brooklyn" by MC Lyte
- "Kids in America" by Kim Wilde
- "Kill That Noise" by MC Shan
- "The Killing of Georgie (Part I and II)" by Rod Stewart
- "Killing Me Softly" by Fugees
- "The King Is Here" by The 45 King
- "King Of Broadway" by Irving Berlin
- "The King Of Broadway" from (The Producers)
- "The King Of Harlem" by Ben Sidran
- "King of New York" by Fun Lovin Criminals
- "King of New York" by The Quireboys
- "King of New York" by Schoolly D
- "King of New York" from the soundtrack to Newsies
- "King of N.Y." by Fat Joe
- "King of My City" by A Boogie wit da Hoodie
- "King of the Cops" by Billy Howard
- "King of the New York Streets" by Dion
- "King's Road" by Tom Petty
- "Kirby Plaza" by Lisa Coleman And Wendy Melvoin
- "Kiss And Tell" by Bryan Ferry
- "Kitty's Back" by Bruce Springsteen
- "Knockin' At The Famous Door" by Charlie Barnet (The Famous Door was a famous New York jazz club)
- "Koka Kola" by The Clash
- "Kuca poso" by Ekrem Jevrić – Gospoda

== L ==
- "L.A. Love (La La)" by Fergie
- "L.A. Girls" by Charlie Puth
- "La Chapelle De Harlem" by Jeane Manson
- "La Java de Broadway" by Michel Sardou
- "La La Land" by Big Daddy Kane
- "La Maleta" by Rubén Blades & Willie Colón
- "La Vie Boheme" by Jonathan Larson, from the musical Rent
- "Labor Day" by Lord Invader
- "Labour Day In Brooklyn" by Cro Cro
- "Ladies" by Mantronix
- "Ladies Night" by Kool & The Gang
- "Lady Cab Driver" by Prince
- "Lady in the Harbor" by Gene Faith
- "Lady in the Harbor" by Waylon Jennings
- "The Lady is a Tramp" by Buddy Greco
- "Lady Liberty" by Claude Nougaro
- "Lady of Fifth Avenue" by Mock Turtle
- "Lady of the Harbor" by Brain Surgeons
- "Lady of the Harbor" by Si Kahn
- "Lady of the Harbour" by David Crosby
- "Lady of the Harbour" by Lee Hoiby
- "Lady on 5th Avenue" by The Monroes
- "Lady on the Rock" by Joe Vitale
- "The Lamb Lies Down on Broadway" by Genesis
- "The Lamp-Posts of Old Broadway" by Benjamin Hapgood Burt (from 'Hip! Hip! Hooray!' music by Raymond Hubbell; lyrics by John Golden)
- "Last Chance to Turn Around" by Gene Pitney
- "Last Exit to Brooklyn" by Bob & Carole Pegg (part of Mr Fox)
- "Last Exit to Brooklyn" by Mark Knopfler
- "Last Exit to Brooklyn" by Modern Talking
- "Last Exit to Brooklyn" by Scott Bedford Four
- "Last Night" by Kid 'n Play
- "Last Summer in New York" by The Saw Doctors
- "Last Tango In Brooklyn" by George Colligan Trio
- "Last Tree in the Bronx" by Artie Traum
- "Later at Minton's" by Stanley Turrentine
- "Latin from Manhattan" by Al Jolson
- "A Latin Tune, A Manhattan Moon, and You" (from Keep Off The Grass)
- "Lavi New York" by Wyclef Jean
- "Lavi New-York" by Toto Necessite
- "Lazy Sunday" by The Lonely Island and Chris Parnell
- "Le Cireur De Souliers De Broadway" by Yves Montand
- "Le Freak" by Chic
- "Le Funambule" by Gerard Lenorman
- "Le Vieux Broadway" by Mort Shuman
- "Leapin' at the Lincoln" by Charlie Barnet
- "Leapin' on Lenox" by Eddie "Lockjaw" Davis
- "Leaving for New York" by Prince
- "Leaving New York" by R.E.M.
- "Lenox Avenue Blues" by Fats Waller
- "Lenox Baby" by Bobby Adams Quintet
- "L.E.S. Artistes" by Santigold
- "L.E.S." by Childish Gambino
- "L.E.S. Gardens" by Nublu Orchestra conducted by Butch Morris
- "Les Sirènes De New York" by Nanette Workman
- "Les Voix De Harlem" by Patrick Juvet
- "Lester's Savoy Jump" by Lester Young
- "Letter to N.Y." by Jun Fukamachi
- "A Letter to the New York Post" by Public Enemy
- "Let Me Clear My Throat" (Old School Reunion Version) by DJ Kool
- "Let Me Off Uptown" by Anita O'Day and Roy Eldridge, 1941
- "Let's Do the Copacabana" (from the musical comedy film Copacabana)
- "Let's Fly Away" by Cole Porter (performed by Anson Weeks, Lee Wiley, Doris Day, Jeri Southern, Bobby Short, and others)
- "Let's Get Rid of New York" by The Randoms
- "Let's Go All the Way" by Sly Fox
- "Let's Go Mets" by Hal Hackady
- "Let Go of NYC" by Brvdley Quinn
- "Let's Go Slumming on Park Avenue" by Irving Berlin
- "Let's Go to Times Square" by A.R.E. Weapons
- "Let's Keep the Dodgers in Brooklyn" by Phil Foster
- "Let's Take a Walk Around the Block" by Harold Arlen, Yip Harburg and Ira Gershwin
- "Levon" by Elton John
- "Lexington Avenue Line" by Montego Joe
- "Lexington Line" by Brother Jack McDuff
- "Lexington Express" by Alex Schultz
- "Lie to Me" by 5 Seconds of Summer
- "Life During Wartime" by Talking Heads
- "Life in Botanical Gardens" by Randall's Island
- "Life In New York" by Monty Kelly And His Orchestra
- "Life in the City" by The Lumineers
- "Life Is a Minestrone" by 10cc
- "Life Is a Rock (But the Radio Rolled Me)" by Reunion
- "Life on Bleecker Street" by Willie Nile
- "The Light Dies Down on Broadway" by Genesis
- "A Light Went Out in New York (Special Tribute to J. Lennon)" by Matthew Fisher And The Downliners Sect
- "Lights of Broadway" by Rigby
- "Lights of New York" by Neil Finn
- "Lightning Strikes (Not Once But Twice)" by The Clash
- "Like the Sun (N.Y.C.)" by Toro
- "The Lily of Longacre Square" (by music by Raymond Hubbell; lyrics by E. Ray Goetz and Glen MacDonough)
- "A Little Chicken Fit for Old Broadway" by Rudolf Friml and Otto Harbach
- "Little Faith" by The National
- "Little Kids" by Kings of Convenience
- "Little Miss Broadway" from Little Miss Broadway
- "Little Old Dreamy New York" (music by Lee David and Maury Rubens; lyrics by J. Keirn Brennan and Moe Jaffe)
- "Little Old New York" (from Tenderloin)
- "Little Old New York" by Victor Herbert
- "Little Old New York is Good Enough for Me" by Dan W. Quinn
- "A Little Somethin'" by LL Cool J
- "Little Spain" by Clifford Jordan
- "Little Italy" by A. Baldwin Sloane and E. Ray Goetz
- "Little Italy" by Stephen Bishop
- "Live and Direct from the House of Hits" by Intelligent Hoodlum (later known as Tragedy Khadafi)
- "Live from New York" by Raekwon
- "Live in New York" by Thierry Maillard Trio
- "Live on Hollis Day" by Davy DMX
- "Livin' in New York" by Kaz Lux Band
- "Livin' in this World" by Guru
- "Livin' la Vida Loca" by Ricky Martin
- "Living for the City" by Stevie Wonder
- "Living in America" by Black 47
- "Living in New York" by Romano Bais
- "Llegada a Nueva York" by Guido & Maurizio De Angelis
- "Local 802 Blues" by George Shearing
- "Local Long Distance Relationship(LA2NY)" by Saint Motel
- "Lola from the Copa" by MC Lyte
- "The London" by Young Thug
- "London in the Rain" by Jeff Beck Band & Upp
- "London Life" by Ian & Sylvia
- "Lonely in New York" by Sophie Milman
- "Lonely Town" (from the musical On the Town)
- "Long Island" by that dog.
- "Long Island" by Trevor Rabin
- "Long Island Boogie" by Flip Phillips
- "Long Island City Here I Come" by Geese (band)
- "Long Island Degrees" by De La Soul
- "Long Island Expressway (LIE)" by Urszula Dudziak
- "Long Island Fling" by Richard Maltby Sr.
- "Long Island Lady" by Marshall Tucker Band
- "Long Island Low Down" (from The Five O'Clock Girl)
- "Long Island Sound" by Stan Getz
- "Long Island Wildin'" by De La Soul
- "Long Night in Long Island" by Red Alert
- "Long Way from Brooklyn" by Down to the Bone
- "Long Way to New York City" by David Liska
- "Look Out for Us Broadway" (by Bert Kalmar and Harry Ruby)
- "Looking for Love on Broadway" by James Taylor
- "Loopzilla" by George Clinton
- "Loose in Harlem" by Freeway
- "Lost and Found" by The Kinks
- "Lost in Manhattan" by Revo Marty & Andi Peking
- "Lost In New York" by DJ SS
- "Lost In New York City" by Drafi Deutscher
- "Lost in the Flood" by Bruce Springsteen
- "Lost in the Streets of NYC" by Tom Trago
- "Lost on Bleecker Street" by David Ippolito
- "Lost on the Bowery" by New Jersey Kings (an alias of the James Taylor Quartet)
- "Loungin' at the Waldorf" by Fats Waller
- "Love Connection in NYC" by American Music Club
- "Love From New York" by Salena Jones
- "Love Is Like a Bottle of Gin" by Stephin Merritt
- "Love Is My Decision" by Chris DeBurgh
- "Love on Broadway" by Jerry Lee Lewis
- "Love, Peace and Nappiness" by Lost Boyz
- "Love Theme from 'London and Davis in New York'" by Chuck Mangione
- "Lovecraft in Brooklyn" by The Mountain Goats
- "Lovers in New York" by Johnny Mathis
- "Love to Die" by Slashstreet Boys
- "Low Down Upon the Harlem River" by Chick Bullock
- "The Lower East Side" by David Peel
- "Lower East Side" by Justin Townes Earle
- "Lower East Side" by U.K. Subs
- "Lower East Side Jazzbo Panorama Blues" by Fool Proof
- "Lower Eastside Tourist" by Mark Eitzel
- "L.S. Blues" by Lonnie Smith
- "Lua" by Bright Eyes
- "The Luckiest Guy on the Lower East Side" by The Magnetic Fields
- "Luces De Nueva York" by La Sonora Santanera
- "Ludlow Street" by The Briefs
- "Ludlow Street" by Julian Casablancas
- "Ludlow Street" by Suzanne Vega
- "Lullaby (2 West 46th Street)" by Moondog
- "Lullaby of Birdland" by Sarah Vaughan, Mel Torme, etc.
- "Lullaby of Broadway" from the musical 42nd Street
- "Lullaby on New York" by Aztec Two-Step
- "Luna En New York" by Joe Sample
- "Luna Park" by Pet Shop Boys
- "Lyrical King (From the Boogie Down Bronx)" by T La Rock

== M ==
- "M79" by Vampire Weekend
- "M Is For Manhattan" by Jill Saward
- "MacDougal Blues" Kevn Kinney
- "MacDougal Street" by Adam Bomb
- "MacDougal Street" by The GoldeBriars
- "MacDougal Street Blues" by Billie Dearborn
- "MacDougal Street Blues" by Jack Kerouac & Joe Strummer
- "MacDougal Street Special" by Elmer Bernstein
- "Machine Gun Funk" by Notorious B.I.G.
- "Macy's Day Parade" by Green Day
- "Madam Manhattan" by George Fenton
- "Made In New York" by Tania Maria
- "Made In NY" by The 45 King
- "Made in NYC" by The Casualties
- "Madhattan Boogie" by Axel Zwingenberger
- "Madison Avenue" by Bachman-Turner Overdrive
- "Madison Avenue" by Dave Mitchell
- "Madison Avenue" by Dave Tofani
- "Madison Avenue" by Gil Scott-Heron
- "Madison Avenue" (from the film How to Stuff a Wild Bikini)
- "Madison Avenue" by Kid Creole & The Coconuts
- "Madison Avenue" by T-Bone Burnett
- "Madison Avenue Hitler" by Fallen Angels
- "Madison Avenue Man" by The Greg Kihn Band
- "Madison Avenue Pusher Man" by Bobby Braddock
- "The Madison Avenue Strut" by Johnny Beecher
- "Madison Avenue Uber Alles" by Louis Nye
- "Madison in Bloomingdales" by Lee Holdridge
- "Madison Square" by Ed Watson & the Brass Circle
- "Madison Square" by Manfredo Fest
- "Madison Square" by Wall Street crash
- "Madison Square Garden" (from Brooklyn)
- "Madison Square Garden" by Lord Kitchener
- "Magic Drums – Central Park" by George Kranz
- "Make a Hit Record" by Bo Diddley
- "Make It Funky (Full Version)" by James Brown
- "Makin' It" by David Naughton
- "Making Sense Of Manhattan" by Robb Johnson
- "Mama Said Knock You Out" by LL Cool J
- "Mambo at the Waldorf" by Xavier Cugat & His Orchestra
- "Mambo Gotham" by Erroll Garner
- "Makes Me Wonder" by Maroon 5
- "The Man from Harlem" by Cab Calloway and his Orchestra
- "Man From Manhattan" by Eddie Howell
- "Man in a Hat" by Klezmatics
- "The Man On The Ferry (The Hoboken Ferry)" by Mitchell Ayres And His Fashions in Music
- "The Man Who Owns Broadway" by George M Cohan
- "The Man Who Took the Valise Off the Floor of Grand Central Station at Noon" by She Trinity
- "Managua, Nicaragua" by Freddy Martin and his Orchestra
- "Maňana In Manhattan" by Pierce Turner
- "The Mandarin Palace on the Grand Concourse" (music by Jerry Livingston; lyrics by Leonard Adelson and Mack David)
- "Manhattan" by Bob Seger and the Silver Bullet Band
- "Manhattan" by Caetano Veloso
- "Manhattan" by Cat Power
- "Manhattan" by Charles Bernstein
- "Manhattan" by Cinerama
- "Manhattan" by Enrique Morente & Lagartija Nick
- "Manhattan" by Eric Johnson
- "Manhattan" by G'race
- "Manhattan" by Gregg Karukas
- "Manhattan" by Harry Roy
- "Manhattan" by Henry Gaffney
- "Manhattan" by Herreys
- "Manhattan" by The Insiders
- "Manhattan" by Jan & Dean
- "Manhattan" by Junko Yagami
- "Manhattan" by The Kids from "Fame"
- "Manhattan" by Kings of Leon
- "Manhattan" by Laura Greene
- "Manhattan" by Louise Attaque
- "Manhattan" by Mandrake
- "Manhattan" by Merci
- "Manhattan" by Michael Holm
- "Manhattan" by Paul Korda
- "Manhattan" by Plus Instruments
- "Manhattan" by Rob Searle (trance tune)
- "Manhattan" by Rodgers and Hart and performed by Tony Bennett, Rosemary Clooney, Blossom Dearie, Bing Crosby, Ella Fitzgerald, John Pizzarelli, Dinah Washington, and many more
- "Manhattan" by Sara Bareilles
- "Manhattan" by Scott Walker
- "Manhattan" by Turnstyle
- "Manhattan" by Visqueen
- "Manhattan" by W&W
- "Manhattan" by Yves Simon
- "Manhattan 24/7" by John Tesh Project
- "Manhattan, 3AM" by Tom Harrell
- "Manhattan Affair" by Mel McDaniel
- "Manhattan Afterdark" by Hidehiko Matsumoto – Great Jazz Trio
- "Manhattan At Midnight" by Robert Mersey
- "Manhattan Avenue" by Nellie McKay
- "Manhattan Bandstand" by Richard Maltby Sr.
- "Manhattan Beach" by John Philip Sousa
- "Manhattan Beggar" by Gerome Ragni, James Rado & Galt MacDermot
- "Manhattan Bittersweet-Snow" by Gerry Niewood And Timepiece
- "Manhattan Blue" by Theo Tams
- "Manhattan Blues" by Cyrus
- "Manhattan Blues" by Manhattan Jazz Quintet
- "Manhattan Blues" by Sam Taylor
- "Manhattan Blues Variations Rag" by David Chesky
- "Manhattan Boogie" by Helmut Zacharias
- "Manhattan Boogie-Woogie" by Landscape
- "Manhattan By Night" by Tim Souster
- "Manhattan Cafés" by Cory Daye
- "Manhattan Carnival (Why Not)" by Dave Tofani
- "Manhattan Carousel" by Charles Lloyd Quartet
- "Manhattan Cowboy" by Susan Cagle
- "Manhattan Cycles" by Revolutionary Ensemble
- "Manhattan Disco" by Lincoln Mayorga
- "Manhattan Downbeat" from The Barkleys of Broadway
- "Manhattan Fable" by Babs Gonzales
- "Manhattan Fever" by Frank Foster
- "Manhattan Fever" by Sonny Stitt
- "Manhattan Fever (Hut-Sa Hut-Sa)" by Sugar
- "Manhattan Flu Dance" by Kazumi Watanabe
- "Manhattan From the Sky" by Kate Voegele
- "Manhattan Hideaway" by Steve Douglas
- "Manhattan Holiday" by Sydney Lipton
- "Manhattan Hop" by John Serry
- "Manhattan Hometown" by David Heneker
- "Manhattan in Blue" by Malta
- "Manhattan in December" by Ann Hampton Callaway
- "Manhattan in January" by Jill Sobule
- "Manhattan in the Rain" by Norma Winstone
- "Manhattan in the Spring" from "Make Mine Manhattan"
- "Manhattan Island" by Corky Siegel
- "Manhattan (Island of Lights and Love)/Manhattan" by Herbie Hancock
- "Manhattan Island Serenade" by Leon Russell
- "Manhattan Jam" by Edgar Hayes And His Orchestra
- "Manhattan-Kaboul" by Renaud with Axelle Red
- "Manhattan Lady" by Phillip Jarrell
- "Manhattan Lights" by Wishful Thinking
- "Manhattan Love Song" by King Errisson
- "Manhattan Lullaby" by Chris Ziemba
- "Manhattan Lullaby" by Mantovani
- "Manhattan Mad" music by Sigmund Romberg; lyrics by Harold Atteridge
- "Manhattan Madness" by Irving Berlin
- "Manhattan Mambo" by Billy May
- "Manhattan Mambo" by Ted Heath and his Music
- "Manhattan Maroomba" by Joe Daniels & His Hotshots in Drumnastikcs
- "Manhattan Martian" by Babylon Zoo
- "Manhattan Mary" music by Ray Henderson; lyrics by Buddy DeSylva and Lew Brown
- "Manhattan Melodrama" by Shakin' Stevens and the Sunsets
- "Manhattan Melody" by Herb Alpert
- "Manhattan Melody" by Johnny Brandon
- "Manhattan Merry-Go-Round" by Saul Chaplin and Sammy Cahn
- "Manhattan Minuet" by Raymond Scott
- "Manhattan Mirage" by Don Gardner Trio Featuring Jimmy Smith And The Wilson Lewes Quartet
- "Manhattan Monotone" by Diane Tell
- "Manhattan Moods" by McCoy Tyner
- "Manhattan Morning" by Stock Aitken Waterman present Mondo Kane
- "Manhattan Morning Blues" by Gunter Hampel & His Galaxie Dream Band
- "Manhattan Morning (Christmas '72)" by Flash
- "Manhattan Nights" by Jeff Tyzik
- "Manhattan Nights" (music by Louis Hirsch; lyrics by Irving Caesar and John Murray Anderson)
- "Manhattan Nocturne" by Charles McPherson
- "Manhattan Nocturne" by Peter Gallway
- "Manhattan on Fire" by Pink Grease
- "Manhattan Paulista" by Sadao Watanabe
- "Manhattan Playboy" by Robert Farnon
- "Manhattan Reflections" by Ahmad Jamal
- "Manhattan Rave" by Evelyn Glennie
- "Manhattan Reflections" by Bernt Rosengren Big Band
- "Manhattan Reverie" by Richie Beirach Trio
- "Manhattan Rhapsody" by John Fox
- "Manhattan:Rico" by George Russell
- "Manhattan Right" by Richard X. Heyman
- "Manhattan Rock" by Elliott Murphy
- "Manhattan Roll" by Telephone Bill and the Smooth Operators
- "Manhattan Romance" by Morris Stoloff
- "Manhattan Rumble (49th Street Massacre)" by Electric Light Orchestra
- "Manhattan Safari" by Al Hirt
- "Manhattan-Scheng" by Embryo
- "Manhattan Serenade" music by Louis Alter and lyrics by Harold Adamson, covered by various artists
- "Manhattan Shuffle" by Area Code (212)
- "Manhattan Skyline" by a-ha
- "Manhattan Skyline" by David Shire
- "Manhattan Skyline" by John Miles
- "Manhattan Skyline" by Julia Fordham
- "Manhattan Skyline" by MFSB
- "Manhattan Skyline" by Robert Maxwell
- "Manhattan Skyline" by Walter Jackson
- "Manhattan Skyline Parts I & II" by Rolf Kuehn
- "Manhattan Skyline And Statues In The Park" by Richard Hazard
- "Manhattan Slide" by Elmore James
- "Manhattan Special" by Teruo Nakamura Featuring Herbie Hancock
- "Manhattan Spiritual" by Reg Owen Orchestra
- "Manhattan Stomp" by Baby Dodds Trio
- "Manhattan Strut" by Luiz Bonfa
- "Manhattan Sunrise" Jan Savitt and his Top Hatters
- "Manhattan Sunrise" by Masaru Yajima
- "Manhattan Sunset" by David Matthews Trio
- "Manhattan Tango" by Ray Martin & His Orchestra
- "Manhattan Tower/Happiness Cocktail" by Gordon Jenkins
- "Manhattan Underground" by Scott Cossu
- "Manhattan Update" by Warren Bernhardt
- "Manhattan Vibes" by Made in Sweden
- "Manhattan Walk" by Herbert Stothart, Bert Kalmar and Harry Ruby
- "Manhattan Woman" by Kansas Hook, Tin Tin
- "Manhattan Woman" by Village People
- "Manhattan-Zigeuner" by Herbert Rehbein
- "A Map of New York" (from the musical "If/Then")
- "Marching Bands of Manhattan" by Death Cab For Cutie
- "Marching Down Broadway" by Nilsson
- "Marcie" by Joni Mitchell
- "Mardi Gras at Midnight" by A Tribe Called Quest
- "Maria Maria" by Santana feat. The Product G&B
- "Mariutch, Down At Coney Isle" by Keith Nichols
- "Married Life In Harlem" by Wilmoth Houdini
- "Marry the Night" by Lady Gaga
- "Marry On 5th Avenue" by GTS
- "Mary Lou (Has Finally Made It to Broadway)" by Bobby Goldsboro
- "Mas in Brooklyn (High Life)" by Pharoah Sanders
- "Mas in Madison Square Garden" by Lord Kitchener
- "Massive Retaliation" by Sigue Sigue Sputnik
- "Max's Kansas City" by Wayne County
- "Me and Julio Down by the Schoolyard" by Paul Simon
- "Me and My Shadow" by Frank Sinatra and Sammy Davis Jr.
- "Me Nu Like Rikers Island" by Cocoa Tea & Nardo Ranks
- "Meet Me at Madison Square" by Tony Middleton
- "Meeting Across the River" by Bruce Springsteen
- "Melbourne's Just Not New York" by Little Heroes
- "Memories of Madison Square Garden (When the Circus Played the Garden)" (from Jumbo)
- "Men of Harlem (Tempo Di Jump)" by Leonard Feather
- "Mercy on Broadway" by Laura Nyro
- "Merengue" by Malcolm McLaren
- "The Mermaid Parade" by Phosphorescent
- "Mermaid's Avenue" by Woody Guthrie
- "The Mess Inside" by The Mountain Goats
- "The Message" by Grandmaster Flash and the Furious Five
- "Metropolitan Nights" by Irving Berlin
- "Metropolitan Opening"/"Metropolitan Opens In Old-Time Splendor" (from the revue As Thousands Cheer)
- "The Metropolitan Squak-Tette" by Louis A. Hirsch, Harold Atteridge and George Bronson-Howard
- "The Mets Special" by Rodd Keith
- "Mexico, Manhattan & Malibu" by Malcolm McLaren
- "Mi Angel De La Guardia" by Pete Rodriguez
- "Miami 2017 (Seen the Lights Go Out on Broadway)" by Billy Joel
- "Miami to Ibiza" by Tinie Tempah
- "Miami Vice: New York Theme" by Jan Hammer
- "Mid-Manhattan" by Casiopea
- "Middle of Harlem" by Gregory Abbott
- "Midi sans soleil" by Jean Guidoni
- "Midnight at The Onyx" (by Mitchell Parish and Will Hudson). The Onyx Club was a famous jazz club.
- "Midnight Cowboy, Theme from" by Toots Thielemans
- "Midnight Cruiser" by Steely Dan
- "Midnight in Chelsea" by Bon Jovi
- "Midnight in Gramercy Square" Dana Suesse
- "Midnight in Harlem" by Chick Webb
- "Midnight in Harlem" by Tedeschi Trucks Band
- "Midnight in Manhattan" by Peter White
- "Midnight in Manhattan" by Seventh Avenue
- "Midnight In New York" by The Demotrons
- "Midnite At Minton's" by Howard McGhee Sextet
- "Midsummer New York" by Yoko Ono/Plastic Ono Band
- "A Midsummer Night in Harlem" by The Drifters
- "Midtown" by Tom Waits
- "Midtown" by The Sea and Cake
- "Midtown Madness" by Hilton Ruiz Trio
- "A Million Miles from Harlem" by Mac & Katie Kissoon
- "Minetta Lane" by Thieves
- "Minetta Lane" by Tommy Page
- "The Minnesota Strip" by The Dictators
- "Minnesota Strip" (from the musical Runaways)
- "Minton's" by Houston Person
- "Minton's Playhouse" by Tommy Knocker
- "Misery On The Hudson" by Terumasa Hino – Kikuchi Quartet
- "Miss Broadway" by La Belle Epoque
- "Miss Liberty" by Irving Berlin
- "Miss Manhattan" by Metropole
- "Miss You" by The Rolling Stones
- "Mitternacht In Manhattan" by Gene Williams
- "Mizz Bed-Stuy" by Brooklyn Funk Essentials
- "Mo Money Mo Problems" by Notorious B.I.G
- "Modern Times" by Al Stewart
- "Modes in Manhattan" by Vernon Duke and John La Touche
- "Moment 4 Life" by Nicki Minaj
- "Moments Of Pleasure" by Kate Bush
- "Mona Lisas and Mad Hatters" by Elton John
- "Mona Lisas and Mad Hatters, pt.2" by Elton John
- "Monday At Minton's" by Chu Berry
- "Monday Night Village Gate" by Terumasa Hino
- "Money In My Pocket" by Dennis Brown & Prince Mohammed
- "Montserrat English" by Arrow
- "Moon Over Brooklyn" by Anne Murray
- "More Shine" by Si*Se
- "Morning Broadway" by Keith Mansfield
- "Morph the Cat" by Donald Fagen
- "Morris Park" by Lenny Sesar
- "Mortal Thought (I Must Roc the Mic)" by KRS-One
- "Morton Street" by Get Wet
- "Morton Street Pier" by Orville Stoeber
- "The Most Expensive Statue in the World" by Irving Berlin
- "The Mother" by Brandi Carlile
- "Mother City" by Ginger
- "Motorcycle Drive By" by Third Eye Blind
- "The Mountains of Manhattan" by Willy DeVille
- "Mourir À Harlem by Nicolas Peyrac
- "Move Over New York" (from the musical Bajour)
- "Movie House In Manhattan" from Make Mine Manhattan
- "Movielike" by Jimmy Eat World
- "Moving to New York" by The Wombats
- "Moving to NYC" by Spek
- "Mr Broadway" by Dave Brubeck
- "Mr. Broadway, U.S.A." by E. Ray Goetz and Malvin M. Franklin
- "Mr D.J." by The Concept
- "Mr Jones Of Wall Street" by Mike Adkins
- "Mr Sax and the Girl" by Paul Nicholas
- "Ms. Park Avenue" by Southside Johnny & The Jukes
- "Much Further to Go" by Rosie Thomas
- "Mulberry Street" by Bryndle
- "Mulberry Street Festival" by Richard Hayman
- "Murda Murda" by Juelz Santana
- "Murmansk Run/Ellis Island" by Al Stewart
- "Music of Manhattan" by Hugo Winterhalter
- "Music Machine (Dedication to Studio 54)" by Asha Puthli
- "Music Makes Me High" by Lost Boyz
- "My Adidas" by Run-DMC
- "My Apartment" by Ben Kweller
- "My Arverne Rose" (E. Ray Goetz and Bert Grant)
- "My Ass Is in the Bronx" by Soul Coughing
- "My Ballad for 46th Street" by Transvision Vamp
- "My Best Girl Is A New Yorker" by Dan W. Quinn
- "My Brooklyn Love Song" from If You Knew Susie
- "My City" (from Seesaw)
- "My City of Ruins" by Bruce Springsteen (originally inspired by Asbury Park, New Jersey)
- "My Favorite Person" by The O'Jays
- "My Favorite Time of Year" by Peter Cincotti
- "My Greenwich Village Sue" by Dick Robertson
- "My Harlem Lullaby" by Mase
- "My Houseboat On The Harlem" (music by Jerome Kern lyrics by Howard Dietz)
- "My Lady of Harlem" by Ken Tobias
- "My Life" by Slaughterhouse
- "My Love Is in New York" by Black 47
- "My Manhattan" (from the musical Daddy Long Legs)
- "My My Metrocard" by Le Tigre
- "My New York" by Ludwig Englander and Harry B. Smith
- "My New York" by Irving Berlin
- "My New York Sweet" by Phil Moore
- "My Opinion Of New York" by Mighty Skipper (calypso)
- "My Own Way (Carnival Mix)" by Duran Duran
- "My Pearl Is A Bowery Girl" by William Jerome and Andrew Mack
- "My Philosophy" by Boogie Down Productions
- "My Rhyme Ain't Done" by LL Cool J
- "My Town" by Patty Smyth
- "Mychal" by Black 47
- "Myriad Harbour" by The New Pornographers
- "Myth Of New York" by Lily Kershaw
- "Mz Broadway" by Joeski Love

== N ==
- "Nachts in Manhattan" by Su Kramer
- "Naked City" by Kiss
- "Naked In Manhattan" by Chappell Roan
- "A Nanny In Manhattan" by Lilys
- "Nashville 9 – New York 1" by Area Code 615
- "Native New Yorker" by Odyssey
- "Navarro Flats" by Bobby Shew
- "Ne Me Quitte Pas" by Regina Spektor
- "Negro In N.Y." by Van Kaye + Ignit
- "Neon New York" by Randall's Island
- "Nesting in a New York Tree" (from Little Johnny Jones)
- "Nesting Time In Flatbush" by Jerome Kern
- "Neurotica" by King Crimson
- "Never Been to Brooklyn" by DJ Freak
- "Never Been to New York" by Daniel Lavoie
- "Never Do A Tango With An Eskimo" by Alma Cogan
- "Never Enough Time" by Nate Borofsky
- "Never Give Your Love (To a New York Woman)" by Alan Carvell
- "Never Gonna Leave New York City" by Gray
- "New Amsterdam" by Elvis Costello
- "New Amsterdam" by Travis
- "New Dorp. New York" by SBTRKT
- "New Jack Swing" by Wreckx-N-Effect
- "New Killer Star" by David Bowie
- "New Lee Highway Blues" by David Bromberg
- "The New Madison Square Garden" by Karl King
- "New New York" by The Cranberries
- "The New New York" by Tru-Life
- "The New New Yorker" by My Life Story
- "New Times Square" by Chris Rea
- "New World...New York...Paradise" by Paradise
- "New Year's Eve In Olde Tymes Square" by Black 47
- "N.E.W. Y.O.R.K." by Chicco Secci Project
- "New York" by The Boxer Rebellion
- "New York" by Chubby Jackson And His Orchestra
- "New York" by Addison Rae
- "New York" by Alicia Keys
- "New York" by Arrogance
- "New York" by Artificial Funk
- "New York" by AZ
- "New York" by Bay City Rollers
- "New York" by Cameo
- "New York" by The Caravelles
- "New York" by Cat Power
- "New York" by Continental Drifters
- "New York" by The Crash
- "New York" by The Creatures (Italian act)
- "New York" by Diesel Disko (Dutch act)
- "New York" by Donald Brown
- "New York" by Dreams
- "New York" by Ed Sheeran
- "New York" by Eskimo Joe
- "New York" by Flower
- "New York" by The Flowers of Romance
- "New York" by Francis Lai
- "New York" by The Game
- "New York" by Geoffrey Downes & The New Dance Orchestra
- "New York" by George Fenton
- "New York" by The Gladiators
- "New York" by Guy Mardel
- "New York" from How to Marry a Millionaire
- "New York" by Joe Purdy
- "New York" by John Lewis
- "New York" by Ken Hensley
- "New York" by Lady Gaga
- "New York" by Leon & Toky AKA Superhero
- "New York" by Lesley Langley
- "New York" by Lil' Louis
- "New York" by Ja Rule
- "New York" by Le Butcherettes
- "New York" by Lesley Langley
- "New York" by Lil Louis
- "New York" by Konstruktivits
- "New York" by Mamamoo
- "New York" by Marc Ricci featuring Anthony Bambury
- "New York" by Melissa Horn
- "New York" by Men & Volts
- "New York" by Michael Rose
- "New York" by Miles Jaye
- "New York" by Nikki Sudden
- "New York" by Nino Ferrer
- "New York" by Nuggets
- "New York" by Ornette Coleman
- "New York" by Ozark Mountain Daredevils
- "New York" by Paloma Faith
- "New York" by Patty Pravo
- "New York" by Paul Weller
- "New York" by Prozzäk
- "New York" by Rapsat
- "New York" by The Rentals
- "New York" by Revolutionary Ensemble
- "New York" by Rhubarb
- "New York" by Richard Ashcroft
- "New York" by Rowdy Rebel
- "New York" by Sex Pistols
- "New York" by Shig & Buzz (featuring Peter Miller
- "New York" by Snow Patrol
- "New York" by Stephen Fretwell
- "New York" by String Driven Thing
- "New York" by St. Vincent
- "New York" by Supercharge
- "New York" by The Templars
- "New York" by The Sea
- "New York" by Thegiornalisti (Italian act)
- "New York" by Tomte
- "New York" by U2
- "New York" by Urban Cone
- "New York" by Vennaskond
- "New York" by X-Mas Twins
- "New York" by Yellowman
- "New York" by The Zombies
- "New York!" by Ferde Grofé (From 'Hudson River Suite')
- "New York 10022" by Jeff Collins
- "New York 19" by Roland Hanna Trio
- "New York 1910" by Nathaniel Shilkret
- "New York 1963 – America 1968" by Eric Burdon
- "New York 4AM" by Sauter-Finegan Orchestra
- "New York 85" by Nino Ferrer
- "New York '93" from Summer Song
- "New York After Hours" by Eddie Gale
- "New York Afternoon" by Richie Cole
- "New York and Chicago" music by Albert Von Tilzer; lyrics by Junie McCree
- "New York As A Muse" by Yoko Ono
- "New York At Night" by Kelly Marie
- "New York at Night" by Willie Nile
- "New York Avec Toi" by Téléphone
- "New York Avenue Bridge" by Royal Trux
- "New York Avignon" by Nicolas Peyrac
- "New York Baby" by Leona Naess
- "New York Baca" by Michał Urbaniak & Urszula Dudziak
- "New York Bars" by Brenda Russell
- "New York Bells" by Ko-Moshun
- "New York Belongs to Me" by Roger Miret and the Disasters
- "New York – Berlin – Paris" by Blue System
- "New York Bittersweet Symphony" by A$AP Rocky
- "New York Blackout" by The Mighty Sparrow
- "New York Blackout" by Soul Asylum
- "New York Bound" by the Critters
- "New York Boy" by Neil Diamond
- "New York/Brazil" by Lee Ritenour
- "New York Breakdown" by Doctor Ross
- "New York Broken Toy" by Nazareth
- "New York Bullseye" by The Shadows of Knight
- "New York Buzz" by Crescent City Gold
- "New York By Night" by Dennis Parker
- "New York Can Wait" by Tyler Hilton
- "New York Central" by Son House
- "New York Charlie, Goodbye" by Gary Burr
- "New York/Chicago" by Mark Imperial
- "New York Child" by Adam Bomb
- "A New York Christmas" by Rob Thomas
- "New York City" by ATC
- "New York City" by Al Kasha
- "New York City" by Alex M.O.R.P.H.
- "New York City" by Alex Oriental Experience
- "New York City" by Alphonse Mouzon
- "New York City" by Andres Javier
- "New York City" by Artful Dodger
- "New York City" by Atlantis
- "New York City" by Big Youth
- "New York City" by Black Russian
- "New York City" by Bobby Lee
- "New York City" by Boney M
- "New York City" by Brotherhood Of Man
- "New York City" by Christie
- "New York City" by The Chainsmokers
- "New York City" by Clean Living
- "New York City" by Clarence Reid
- "New York City" by Cub, covered by They Might Be Giants
- "New York City" by The Cult
- "New York City" by Damon and Naomi
- "New York City" by David McNeil
- "New York City" by Delbert McClinton
- "New York City" by The Demics
- "New York City" by The Destructors
- "New York City" by Don Fardon
- "New York City" by Duncan Brothers
- "New York City" by Eddi Reader
- "New York City" by Emigrate
- "New York City" by Evergreen
- "New York City" by Fist
- "New York City" by Flashlight Brown
- "New York City" by The Fleshtones
- "New York City" by Frances Black
- "New York City" by Gatlin Brothers
- "New York City" by Gil Scott-Heron
- "New York City" by Glen Adams
- "New York City" by Hanoi Rocks
- "New York City" by Harris Chalkitis
- "New York City" by Henry Gross
- "New York City" by The Heptones
- "New York City" by Herman Chin Loy
- "New York City" by Homer
- "New York City" by Homestead
- "New York City" by I Roy
- "New York City" by Israel Vibration
- "New York City" by Joey Ramone
- "New York City" by John Lennon and Yoko Ono
- "New York City" by Johnny Rivers
- "New York City" by Jonas Fjeld Rock'n'Rolf Band
- "New York City" by Katja Ebstein
- "New York City" by Ken Tobias
- "New York City" by Kevin Johnson
- "New York City" by Kristin
- "New York City" by Kylie Minogue
- "New York City" by Lead Belly
- "New York City" by Leapy Lee
- "New York City" by Lenny Breau
- "New York City" by Lenny Kravitz
- "New York City" by Little Louie Vega
- "New York City" by The Lox
- "New York City" by Madball
- "New York City" by Peter Malick and Norah Jones
- "New York City" by The Manhattans
- "New York City" by Mason Jennings
- "New York City" by Mayday
- "New York City" by Meadowmuffin
- "New York City" by Mike Hurst
- "New York City" by Mimi & J.P. Foucault
- "New York City" by Mina Caputo
- "New York City" by Miroslav Vitous
- "New York City" by moe.
- "New York City" by The Mojo Men
- "New York City" by The Nuns
- "New York City" by The Outfield
- "New York City" by Owl City
- "New York City" by Pat McGlynn Band
- "New York City" by Paul Sahlin
- "New York City" by Paul van Dyk
- "New York City" by Peter Malick Group
- "New York City" by Peter Pringle
- "New York City" by PhD
- "New York City" by The Precisions
- "New York City" by Punch Brothers
- "New York City" by Puzzle
- "New York City" by Revanche
- "New York City" by Roxy
- "New York City" by the Roy Wood Big Band
- "New York City" by Sham 69
- "New York City" by Sidney Barnes
- "New York City" by Snowball
- "New York City" by Sonia Dada
- "New York City" by Stanley Clarke
- "New York City" by Statler Brothers
- "New York City" by Stisism
- "New York City" by Sue Lawrence
- "New York City" by Suzzy Roche
- "New York City" by T. Rex
- "New York City" by Tabou Combo
- "New York City" by Tom Wilson and the Florida Razors
- "New York City" by Tritons
- "New York City" by Troy Ave
- "New York City" by Ursuline Kairson
- "New York City" by Veronica Unlimited
- "New York City" by Village People
- "New York City" by Walter Zwol
- "New York City" by Wild Horses
- "New York City" by Winston Soso (soca)
- "New York City" by Womack & Womack
- "New York City 4am" by Bonnie and the Boys
- "New York City Band" by New York City Band
- "New York City Beat" by Man 2 Man
- "New York City Blackout" by Blues Image
- "New York City Blues" by Bonnie Koloc
- "New York City Blues" by Country Weather
- "New York City Blues" by Duke Ellington
- "New York City Blues" by Johnny Green & The Greenmen
- "New York City Blues" by Merle Haggard
- "New York City Blues" by Neil Sedaka
- "New York City Blues" by The Yardbirds
- "New York City Boy" by Christi Roxxe
- "New York City Boy" by Mabel
- "New York City Boy" by Pet Shop Boys
- "New York City Bump" by Black Rock
- "New York City By Day" by Thomas Newman
- "New York City Christmas" by The Cover Girls
- "New York City Cops" by The Strokes
- "New York City Cowboys" by Randy Barlow
- "New York City Don't Mean Nothing" by Savatage
- "New York City Dream" by Tara Schaft & Black Diamond
- "New York City Dreams" by Tommy McLain
- "New York City Dues" by Johnny Rivers
- "The New York City Ghost" by Herbie Harper
- "New York City Girl" by Billy Joe Shaver
- "New York City Girl" by John Waite
- "New York City Girl" by Modern Talking
- "New York City Girls" by Reverend Horton Heat
- "New York City Has No Power" by Phoebe Buffay, (Lisa Kudrow)
- "New York City Here I Come" by Albert Hammond
- "New York City Hotel Blues" by Margot & the Nuclear So and So's
- "New York City, I Ain't Afraid of You" by Michael Wendroff
- "New York City (In The Night)" by Marvin Scott
- "New York City Is Killin Me" by Ray LaMontagne
- "New York City Is Waiting" by Bjorn Skifs
- "New York City (Just Another Night In)" by Star Sisters
- "New York City Kingsize Rosewood Bed" by Charlie Daniels Band
- "New York City Life" by David Cassidy
- "New York City Lights" by Sophie Ellis-Bextor
- "New York City Moves to the Sound of L.A." by Funeral Party
- "New York City Nights" by Eli Nissan
- "New York City Nights" by Leif Garrett
- "New York City Pakistan" by Terre Roche
- "New York City People" by 212
- "New York City Police" by Vladimir Cosmo
- "New York City Rain" by Edward Hand
- "New York City Refugee" by Bob A. Feldman
- "New York City RFD" by Waylon Jennings
- "New York City Rhythm" by Barry Manilow
- "New York City (Saint in the City)" by The Academy Is...
- "New York City (Send My Baby Home)" by Dig Richards
- "New York City Serenade" by Bruce Springsteen
- "New York City Snow" by Johnny Rodriguez
- "New York City Song" by Dion
- "New York City Song" by Linda Hargrove
- "New York City Streets" by Life Force
- "New York City Streets" by Triumph
- "The New York City Strut" by 24th Street Band
- "New York City Suite" by Walter Murphy
- "New York City Suite 409" by Lee Clayton
- "New York City Twist" by The Candymen
- "New York City War Call" by Lost Boyz
- "New York City Winter by Pete Hicks & Nick Magnus
- "New York City (Who Am I?) by Splinter
- "New York City Woman" by Sunburst Band (featuring Dave Lee)
- "New York City You Ain't" by Potliquor
- "New York City (You're a Woman)" by Al Kooper
- "New York City's A Lonely Town" by Dick Jensen
- "New York, Cloud 9" by Ken Muramatsu
- "New York Collapse" by Sassafras
- "New York Communications" by Kamasutra
- "New York Connection" by Sweet
- "New York Connection" by Terry Brooks & Strange
- "New York Connection" by Tom Scott
- "New York Connection Blues" by Frank Dell
- "New York Cowboys" by Randy Barlow
- "New York Dash" by Keith Emerson
- "The New York Debut Of An L.A. Artist (Jazz Crowd)" by Andy Prieboy
- "New York Dem Want Go" by Jim Irie (reggae)
- "New York Doll" by David Dundas
- "New York Dream's Suite" by Happy The Man
- "New York Electric Street Music" by Larry Young
- "New York Express" by Hardhead (an alias of Armand Van Helden)
- "New York Eyes" by Nicole McCloud and Timmy Thomas
- "New York Fever" by The Toasters
- "New York FM" by Breeder
- "New York Full" by Michigan & Smiley
- "New York Gangstaz" by LL Cool J
- "New York Giants" by Big Punisher
- "New York Girl" by Freelance Vandals
- "New York Girl" by Simon F Featuring Steve Stevens
- "New York Girls" by The Mooney Suzuki
- "New York Girls" by Morningwood
- "New York Girls" by Steeleye Span
- "The New York Girls Club" by Rebecca Pidgeon
- "New York Good Sugar" by Kathy McCord
- "New York Goodbye" by Frummox
- "New York Groove" by Hello, Ace Frehley
- "New York Groover" by The Gorillas
- "New York Guitar" by David Matthews
- "New York (Harlem Session)" by Nuggets
- "New York Hippodrome" by John Philip Sousa
- "New York (Hold Her Tight)" by Restless Heart
- "New York Hole" by Dan Melchior Und Das Menace
- "New York House" by Jellybean
- "New York Hustle" by David A. Stewart
- "New York, I Love It When You're Mean" by Julian Velard
- "New York, I Love You But You're Bringing Me Down" by LCD Soundsystem
- "New York in a Nutshell" by Tony Acquaviva
- "New York in My Pocket" by Kill City (featuring Lisa Moorish)
- "New York in the Fifties" by Stephen Bishop
- "New York Injection" by Bob Florence
- "New York Firefighter" by The Wiggles
- "New York in the 70s (Sesame St.)" by Catherine Feeny
- "New York in the Spring" by Catherine Feeny
- "New York Injection" by Bob Florence
- "New York Inside My Head" by Nicky Holland
- "New York Is a Christmas Kind of Town" by Marah
- "New York Is a Jungle Festival" by Herbie Mann
- "New York Is a Woman" by Suzanne Vega
- "New York Is Closed Tonight" by Barry Greenfield
- "New York Is Killing Me" by Gil Scott-Heron
- "New York Is My Home" by Dion and Paul Simon
- "New York Is My Kind of Town" by Metropolis
- "New York Is Rockin'" by Curtis Stigers
- "New York is Rockin'" by Willie Nile
- "New York (Is Sure A Funny City)" by Fishbaugh, Fishbaugh & Zorn
- "New York Is the Moon" by Duffo
- "New York Is The Place" by Brooklyn Express
- "New York Is The Same Old Place" music by Victor Herbert lyrics by Buddy De Sylva
- "New York City Is Waiting" by Björn Skifs
- "New York Is Where I Live" by Steve Tyrell
- "New York Is Where I'd Rather Be" by Dave Crawford
- "New York Isn't Such A Bad Old Town" from 'Over The River' by John Golden
- "New York Jets" by Emmett Till
- "New York Jig" by Seamus Shannon
- "New York Joe and Red Neck Tennessee" by Freddie Hart & The Heartbeats
- "New York Kids" by Marc Jordan
- "New York — L.A." by Grandmaster Melle Mel & Scorpio
- "New York Ladies" by Michael Chapman
- "New York Lady" by Burt Bacharach
- "New York Lament" by Horace Silver
- "New York Life" by Monte Carlo and Alma M. Sanders
- "New York Lights" by Jimi Bertucci
- "New York Lights" by Fort Atlantic
- "New York Liner" by Dave Matthews
- "New York, London, Amsterdam" by Captain Tinrib and Steve Thomas
- "New York – London – Paris – Chicago" by Soup
- "(New York London Paris) Spleen" by Art Of Noise
- "New York, Los Scandulous" by Mellow Man Ace
- "New York Mama" by Doc & Prohibition
- "New York Mambo" by Johnny Colon
- "New York Melody" by Joachim Heider & Michael Holm
- "New York Mellow" by Bob James
- "The New York Mets" by The Duke of Iron
- "New York Mining Disaster 1941" by Bee Gees
- "A New York Minute" by Alan Licht
- "New York Minute" by Don Henley
- "New York Minute" by Flashback Heart Attack
- "New York Minute" by Mobile
- "New York Minute" by The Skatalites
- "New York Minute" by Zoetrope
- "New York Mood (New Haircut and a Busted Lip)" by Tom Waits
- "New York Moon" by Louise Redknapp
- "New York Morning" by elbow
- "New York Morning" by Gunhill Road
- "New York Moves" by Demo Cates (member of The Fabulous Counts)
- "New York Muscle" by A.R.E. Weapons
- "New York: My Port Of Call" by Jimmy Roselli
- "New York Nagaram" by AR Rahman
- "New York Neighbors" by King Django
- "New York, New York" by Charlie Ainley
- "New York, New York" by Ben Verdery
- "New York, New York" by Cevin Fisher
- "New York, New York" by The Dictators
- "New York, New York" by The Dogg Pound feat. Snoop Dogg
- "New York, New York" by Duke Ellington
- "New York, New York" by Gerard Kenny
- "New York, New York" by Grandmaster Flash and the Furious Five
- "New York, New York" by Ja Rule featuring Fat Joe and Jadakiss
- "New York, New York" by Johnny Winter
- "New York, New York" by The Last Poets
- "New York, New York" by Marc Jordan
- "New York, New York" by The Masterbuilders
- "New York, New York" by Moby ft. Debbie Harry of Blondie
- "New York, New York" by Money Bazz (hip hop)
- "New York, New York" by Nina Hagen
- "New York, New York (On the Town)" music by Leonard Bernstein lyrics by Comden and Green (from On the Town)
- "New York, New York" by Back Street Crawler
- "New York, New York" by Paul Maddox & DJ GRH
- "New York, New York" by Plus Instruments
- "New York, New York" by Ryan Adams
- "New York, New York" by Starship Orchestra
- "New York, New York" by Watsonian Institute
- "New York, New York" by Wired
- "New York, New York, New York" by Martha Wainwright
- "New York, New York (Start Spreading the News)" by B.o.B featuring Alicia Keys
- "New York, New York (The People's Paradise)" by Mickey Baker
- "New York-New York's A Lonely Town" by Adolph Green and Betty Comden
- "New York Nights" by Amant II
- "New York Nights" by David Fennell & Wendy Grose
- "New York Nights" by Jesse Malin
- "New York Nights" by Recoil
- "New York / N.Y." by Nina Hagen
- "New York, NY 10009" by Black 47
- "New York On Sunday" by Paulette McWilliams
- "New York On My Mind" by John McLaughlin
- "New York Paranoia" by Bram Tchaikovsky
- "New York Paranoia" by Love Machine
- "New York Party" by Early B
- "New York Police State" by Agnostic Front
- "New York Polka" by Lauren Newton/Urszula Dudziak/Jeanne Lee/Jay Clayton/Bobby McFerrin
- "New York Rain" by Last Autumn's Dream
- "New York Raining" by Charles Hamilton featuring Rita Ora
- "New York Rapper" by Bobby Jimmy and the Critters Russ Parr
- "The New York Reel" by Tactics
- "New York City, RFD" by Larry Collins by Larry Collins
- "New York Rhapsody" by George Gershwin
- "New York – Rio – Tokyo" by Trio Rio
- "New York Ryder Music" by Agallah
- "New York Salute" by M.O.P.
- "New York Samba" by Bob James & Earl Klugh
- "New York Satyricon Zany" by Andy Bown
- "New York Scene" by Sadao Watanabe
- "New York City (Send My Baby Home)" by Digby Richards
- "New York Serenade" (from Rosalie)
- "New York Shit" by Busta Rhymes
- "New York Shuffle" by Capp/Pierce Orchestra Featuring Ernie Andrews
- "The New York Shuffle" by Graham Parker
- "New York Shuffle" by Lionel Hampton
- "New York Sidewalk" by UB40
- "New York Situation" by Milo and the Kings (calypso)
- "New York Skiffle" by Half Man Half Biscuit
- "New York Skyline" by Francie Conway
- "New York Skyline" by Garland Jeffreys
- "New York Skyline" by Sam Signaoff
- "New York Slave" by The Blood Brothers
- "New York Slip Away" by Shirley Lites
- "New York Snow" by Lunch at Allen's
- "New York Sokaklarında" by MFÖ
- "New York Song" by Modern Skirts
- "The New York Song" by Skytone
- "NewYorkSoul" by Jon Bellion
- "New York Soul" by Ray Barretto
- "New York Soul – Pt. ii" by Jon Bellion
- "New York Special" by Peter Herbolzheimer Rhythm Combination & Brass
- "New York Stakes" by Pete Haycock
- "New York State of Mind" by Alicia Keys, Nas, and Rakim
- "New York State of Mind" by Billy Joel; covered by Mel Tormé and others
- "New York Stories" by Judy Niemack & Jim McNeely
- "New York Stories" by Justin Johnson & 3PO
- "New York Strait Talk" by Gang Starr
- "New York Street Song (No Easy Way)" by The Four Seasons
- "New York Strut" by Fist-O-Funk Orchestra
- "New York Strut" by Masayoshi Takanaka
- "New York Studio 1959" by Flat Duo Jets
- "New York Style" by Fatback Band
- "New York Subway" by Casey Rankin
- "New York Subway" by Lord Invader
- "New York Suite In C Major" by Robin Gibb and RJ Gibb
- "New York Summer" by Louisa Melcher
- "New York Sun" by Tyla Gang
- "New York Survivor" by Good Rats
- "New York Takeover" by Jay-Z, Nas, and Tru Life
- "New York Taxi" by Harry Belafonte
- "New York Telephone Conversation" by Lou Reed
- "New York Television" by Michel Laurent
- "New York Tendaberry" by Laura Nyro
- "New York – The Sound of The City" (from the film Can't Stop the Music)
- "New York Theme (Hey, You Can Have that Heart Attack Outside Buddy)" by Tom Waits
- "New York, Thirty-One" by Richard Anthony
- "New York Time" by Night Ranger
- "New York Times" by Bobbi Humphrey
- "New York Times" by Cat Stevens
- "New York Times" by City Boy
- "The New York Times" by David Grahame
- "New York Times" by David Hess
- "The New York Times" by Gene Watson
- "New York Times" by J. Cole, 50 Cent and Bas
- "New York Times" by The Motels
- "New York Times" by Terumasa Hino
- "New York Times" by Yellow Brick Road
- "New York To California" by Mat Kearney
- "New York To Chicago" by Chubby Jackson
- "New York To Moscow" by Jimmy Ross with the M.T. Foundation (Jimmy James Ross)
- "New York To New Orleans" by Pee Wee King & His Golden West Cowboys
- "New York Törpéi-1 & 2/Pygmies Of New York-1 & 2 by Peter Ogi
- "New York Town" by Black 47
- "New York Town" by Dion & The Belmonts
- "New York Town" by The Dixiebelles
- "New York Town" by Johnny Paycheck
- "New York Town" by Rick James
- "New York Town" by Woody Guthrie
- "New York Trader" by Hedgehog Pie
- "The New York Trains" by Del McCoury Band
- "New York Turnaround" by Rocky Hill
- "New York Twist" by Don Covay
- "New York Twist And Freeze" by Orlie and the Saints
- "New York Undercover" by DJ Muggs
- "New York, USA" by Serge Gainsbourg (covered by Mick Harvey)
- "New York Used To Feel Like Home" by Anna Maria
- "New York Vampires" by The Nuns
- "New York Wakes" by Horslips
- "New York Was Great" by The Raveonettes
- "New York What Is Funky" by Ultramagnetic MCs
- "New York, What's the Matter with You? (Good Bye My Tango)" (music by Raymond Hubbell; lyrics by George V. Hobart)
- "New York Windy Day" by Frank Ricotti & Mike de Albuquerque
- "New York Wine And Tennessee Shine" by Dave & Sugar
- "New York Woman" by Cashman & West
- "New York Woman" by George Jackson
- "New York Woman" by Jack Starr
- "New York Woman" by Tyzik
- "New York Woman (Of Ebony Shade)" by Rennie Ren
- "New York Woman Serenade" by Creation
- "New York (Ya Out There?)" by Rakim
- "New York Yankees Polka" by Conn. Twins Orchestra
- "New York, You're Going Crazy" by Ernie Smith
- "New York (You're the Best Town in Europe)" (music by Raymond Hubbell; lyrics by Raymond W. Peck)
- "New York Zien" by The Scene
- "The New Yorker" by Baby Washington
- "The New Yorker" by David Chesky
- "The New Yorker" by Hi-Tek
- "New Yorker" by John Crisp
- "New Yorker" by Johnny Ringo
- "New Yorker" by Tank Source
- "New Yorker In Exile" by Arnold McCuller
- "New Yorkin" by The Whole Darn Family
- "New York's A Lonely Town" by The Trade Winds
- "New York's Alright (If You Like Saxophones)" by Fear (covered by Enon)
- "New York's Best Kept Secret" (from Sharpay's Fabulous Adventure)
- "New York's In Love" by David Bowie
- "New York's Jewels" by Jack's Angels (group featuring Jack Grunsky)
- "New York's Movin'" by Ahzz
- "New York's My Home" written by Gordon Jenkins, recorded by Sammy Davis Jr., Ray Charles, and others.
- "New York's Not My Home" by Jim Croce
- "New York's Not My Home" by Kid Rock
- "New York's On Fire" by Classical Two
- "New York's On Fire" by Seventh Avenue
- "New York's One Soulful City" by Hank Crawford
- "New York's So Nice They Named It Twice" by Rich Fudoli
- "New York World's Fair" by Wilbert Harrison
- "Next Exit" by Interpol
- "The Next Ten Minutes" from the musical The Last Five Years
- "N***** Bleed" by Notorious B.I.G.
- "A Night In Central Park" by Sir Lancelot & the Caribbean Serenaders
- "Night In Manhattan" by Leo Robin and Ralph Rainger
- "A Night In New York" by Elbow Bones and the Racketeers
- "Night Life In Old Manhattan" (music by Raymond Hubbell; lyrics by George V. Hobart)
- "The Night That Goldman Spoke At Union Square" (from Ragtime)
- "The Night That New York Cried" by Prelude
- "The Night That the Lights Went Out in NYC" by The Ataris from Spider-Man 2
- "The Night the Lights Went Out" by The Trammps
- "The Night They Raided Minsky's" by Rudy Vallee
- "Night Time In New York" by Teenage Head
- "Night Train To The Bronx" by Minimal Funk
- "Nighttrain" by Public Enemy
- "Nightmare On 187th Street" by 187 Lockdown
- "Nights In Harlem" by Luther Vandross
- "Nights In New York City" by Jan Bradley
- "Nights On Broadway" by the Bee Gees
- "Nights Over New York" by MC Miker G & DJ Sven
- "Nighttime in Tribeca" by Kenny G
- "No Diggity" by Blackstreet featuring Dr. Dre
- "No Faith In Brooklyn" by Hoodie Allen
- "No Floods" by Lady Gaga
- "No Hay Marcha en Nueva York" by Mecano
- "No Hot Water Way Up In The Bronx" by Monroe Silver
- "No Pity in the Naked City" by Jackie Wilson
- "No Sleep Till Brooklyn" by Beastie Boys
- "No Sure Way" by Loudon Wainwright III
- "No Winners (Ground Zero)" by Paul Hardcastle
- "No Woman, No Cry" by The Fugees
- "Nobody Knows New York" by Little Mike and the Tornadoes
- "Noche En Down Town" by Fito Páez
- "Nolita Fairytale" by Vanessa Carlton
- "North On 95" by Shawn Mullins
- "North River" by Larry Fast
- "Northeast" by Matt and Kim
- "Northern Boulevard Blues" by Louis Armstrong
- "Northwest 222" by Harry Chapin
- "Nostalgia In Times Square" by Charles Mingus
- "Nostrand And Fulton" by Freddie Hubbard
- "Not So Soft" by Ani DiFranco
- "Not Tonight" by Lil' Kim
- "Notorious B.I.G." by Notorious B.I.G. featuring Lil' Kim and Puff Daddy
- "Nothing is Lost (you give me strength)" by The Weeknd
- "Nougayork" by Claude Nougaro
- "Now Is Tomorrow (Experiment In Sound Part 1)" by Definition Of Sound
- "Now Ride The "D" Train" by Al Sears
- "Now That We've Found Love" by Heavy D & The Boyz
- "Nueva York" by Willie Colon
- "Nueva York" by The Coast
- "Nueva York" by Santana (from the album Shango)
- "Nueva York" by Fuego '77
- "Nueva York" by Guaraná
- "Nueva York, Nueva York" by Los Amaya
- "Nuyorica Fiesta" by Speedometer
- "NY" by Jeru The Damaja
- "N.Y." by A Man Called Adam
- "N.Y." by Doves
- "N.Y." by Frida Hyvönen
- "N.Y." by Titiyo
- "The N.Y. Butt" by Spyder-D
- "NYC" from the Broadway musical Annie
- "NYC" by Bryan Ferry
- "NYC" by Burial
- "NYC" by David Hallyday
- "NYC" by Fused
- "NYC" by Hurricane#1
- "NYC" by Interpol
- "NYC" by Joe Beck
- "NYC" by Kenny "Dope" Gonzalez
- "NYC" by Kevin Rudolf
- "NYC" by Mark Springer
- "NYC" by Neal Schon
- "NYC" by Permanent Me
- "NYC" by Puzzle
- "NYC" by Resurrection Band
- "NYC" by Steps Ahead
- "NYC" by Steve Earle
- "NYC" by T.H. & The Wreckage
- "NYC" by Weather Report
- "NYC" by Wire
- "NYC 1999!" by Pussy Galore
- "NYC-25" by The Olivia Tremor Control
- "NYC75" by The Destructors
- "NYC Awakes" by Didier Malherbe
- "NYC Beat" by Armand Van Helden
- "NYC Bitche$" by Awkwafina
- "NYC Blues" by Rita Moreno
- "NYC (Can You Believe This City?)" by Charles & Eddie
- "NYC C—T" by Princess Superstar
- "NYC Dharma" by A Reminiscent Drive
- "NYC Direct" by John Tropea
- "NYC Girl" by David Mead
- "NYC Girls" by Joe McIntyre of New Kids on the Block
- "NYC Girls" by Matt Mays
- "NYC Ghosts & Flowers" by Sonic Youth
- "N.Y.C. Groove #1" by Jaco Pastorius
- "N.Y.C. Groove #2" by Jaco Pastorius
- "N.Y.C. Lies In Dust" by Prince Quick Mix
- "N.Y.C. L.O.V.E." by Coachwhips
- "NYC Man" by Lou Reed
- "NYC Overload" by Clock DVA
- "NYCPD" by Dangerouz Waters
- "NYC Shanty" by Danny Wilson
- "NYC Slippers" by Baby Ford
- "NYC Song" by Charles & Eddie (Samples 'For What It's Worth' by Buffalo Springfield)
- "NYC Song" by John Cafferty & The Beaver Brown Band
- "NYC Soul" by Kane
- "NYC Speedcore" by D.O.A.
- "NYC Street Corner Battle" by Ultra (rap group featuring Kool Keith and Tim Dog)
- "NYC Streets" by David Allan Coe
- "NYC (There's No Need to Stop)" by The Charlatans
- "NYC Tonight" by GG Allin
- "N.Y.C. Tripin" by Soul Ballet
- "NYC Weather Report" by Five For Fighting
- "NYC's Like a Graveyard" by The Moldy Peaches
- "NYCNYUSA" by Fatback Band
- "N.Y. City " by Alan Merrill
- "N.Y. City Local" by Del Jays
- "NYC's Attitude" by Djaimin
- "NY Doll" by David Johansen
- "NY Electric" by Aesop Rock
- "NY Excuse" by Soulwax
- "N.Y. Groove" by Third Bass
- "N.Y. I Love You" by Big Apple Brass
- "N.Y. Kangaroo" Eddie Billups & The Gigs
- "N.Y. Is My Love"by Manhattan Jazz Orchestra
- "NY LA" by Steve Cole
- "N.Y. Nightmare" by Phoebe Legere
- "N.Y. N.J."/"Back To N.Y. N.J." by Jovonn
- "N.Y. Noodle Town" by Yoko Ono & the Plastic Ono Band
- "N.Y. N.Y." by Steinski (of Double Dee and Steinski)
- "N.Y. N.Y. (The World's My Home)" by Platypus
- "NYCNY" by Daryl Hall
- "NY NY LA LA" by Lil Mama and Snoop Dogg
- "N.Y. One" by Paul Mauriat
- "NYPD Theme" by Johnny "Hammond" Smith
- "N.Y. Pie" by The Brakes
- "N.Y. Plantation" by Nature Boys
- "N.Y. Pot" by Jovonn
- "N.Y./L.A. Rappers" by Jimmy and the Critters Russ Parr
- "N.Y. Slam" by The Mob
- "N.Y. Snow" by Marc Jordan
- "N.Y. Stars" by Lou Reed
- "N.Y. State of Mind" by Nas
- "N.Y. State of Mind Pt. 2" by Nas
- "N.Y. Style Eddie" by Josh Freese
- "NY Style (Funk In The Punk)" by Sucker DJ's and ATFC Featuring Armand Van Helden
- "N.Y. Times" by John Pollard
- "N.Y. To The O" by Richie Rich
- "N.Y. To The U.K." by Percee P
- "N.Y. Trip" by The Cure
- "NYU" by Ponta Box
- "NYU Girls" by The Argument
- "N.Y. Weather Report" by Talib Kweli
- "N.Y. Woman" by Kasenetz-Katz Super Circus
- "N.Y., You Got Me Dancing" by Andrea True Connection
- "N.Y. You Let Me Down" by Thunderhead
- "N.Y.'s Idea Number 1"/"N.Y.'s Idea Number 2" by J.J. Johnson, Milt Jackson, Kai Winding, Max Roach And Oscar Pettiford

== O ==
- "Oak Leaf Memorial Park" (music by Jerry Livingston; lyrics by Mack David)
- "Ocean Parkway" by Spyro Gyra
- "Ode To The Brooklyn Bridge" (from the musical Kelly)
- "Off Broadway" by Buddy Childers
- "Off Broadway" by Don Costa
- "Off Broadway" by Every Time I Die
- "Off Broadway" by George Benson
- "Off Broadway" by Pat Alger
- "Off Broadway" by Steve Cole
- "Off To Greenwich Village" music by Carlton Kelsey and Maurice Rubens; lyrics by Clifford Grey
- "Off to New York" by Gustave Kerker and by R.H. Burnside
- "Oh Brooklyn" by Sad Bastards of Brooklyn
- "Oh Oh I Love Her So" by Ramones
- "Oh You Chicago, Oh You New York" by Albert Von Tilzer and Junie McCree
- "Oh You Wonderful Girl/East Side, West Side" by George M Cohan
- "Ohrbach's, Bloomingdale's, Best & Saks" from Coco
- "Ol' Five Spot" by Charles Lloyd
- "The Old 52nd Street Rag" by Roswell Rudd Trio
- "Old Broadway" by Company of Strangers
- "Old Broadway" by The Rivits (Jess Roden)
- "Old Brownstone in Brooklyn" by Teresa Brewer
- "The Old Canarsie Line" by Benny Bell
- "Old Man Harlem" by Hoagy Carmichael and Rudy Vallée (covered by The Dorsey Brothers, Dave Frishberg, Ethel Waters, and others)
- "Old Man Manhattan" by Anne Caldwell and James O'Dea
- "Old Man Subway" by Arthur Swanstrom, Ben Oakland, Louis Alter, Owen Murphy, Robert A. Simon and Robert Russell Bennett
- "Old Manhattan Melodies" by Gary Brooker
- "Old Men Sleeping On The Bowery" by Willie Nile
- "Old New York" (music by Jerome Kern; lyrics by Anne Caldwell and Glen MacDonough)
- "Old New York" by Luke Temple
- "Old New York" by The Mighty Duke
- "Old School" by 2pac
- "Old Soul Song (For the New World Order)" by Bright Eyes (about the anti-war protests held in New York City on February 15th, 2003)
- "The Oldest Established (Permanent Floating Crap Game In New York)" by Frank Loesser from the 1950 musical Guys and Dolls
- "Olympia, WA" by Rancid
- "Omar Bay" by State Radio
- "On A Roof In Manhattan" by Irving Berlin from the 1932 musical Face the Music
- "On And On " by Aswad featuring Sweetie Irie
- "On Broadway" by Barry Mann & Cynthia Weil with Jerry Leiber and Mike Stoller, for The Drifters (1963), also performed by George Benson and many others
- "On Broadway" by Bogart
- "On Broadway Tonight" by The Four Seasons
- "(On) Double Fifth Avenue" by Abel Baer, Joe Young and Sam M. Lewis
- "On Frantic Fifth" by Peter Nero
- "On Lexington & 52nd Street" (from Smash)
- "On My Way to Harlem" by Coolio
- "On My Way to Harlem" by Gregory Porter
- "On Point" by House Of Pain
- "On Riverside Drive" by Arthur Ross and his Westerners (featuring Ben Selvin)
- "On Second And Fifth" by Sonny Fortune
- "On Seventh Avenue" by Pino Donaggio
- "On The Avenue" by Irving Berlin
- "On The Bowery" by Ferre Grignard
- "On The Drag" by They Might Be Giants
- "On The Gay White Way" from My Gal Sal
- "On The Hudson" by Goldman Band
- "{On} The Levee Along Broadway" music by E. Ray Goetz and Sigmund Romberg; lyrics by E. Ray Goetz
- "On The Mall" by Edwin Franko Goldman (refers to 'The Mall' at the Naumburg Bandshell in Central Park)
- "On The Steps Of Grant's Tomb" by Irving Berlin
- "(On The Street) Of New York City" by Harvey Scales
- "On The Streets Of The Bronx" by The Moonglows
- "On The Subway" by The Last Poets
- "Once In Love NYC" by David Morales Presents Brooklyn Friends
- "Once Upon a Time in New York City" music by Barry Mann; lyrics by Howard Ashman; performed by Huey Lewis in the 1988 Disney animated film Oliver & Company
- "One" by Bee Gees
- "One Day You'll Dance For Me New York City" by Thomas Dybdahl
- "One Foot: by FUN.
- "One More Chance" by Notorious B.I.G.
- "One More Night In Brooklyn" by Justin Townes Earle
- "One Night In New York" by Gene Farrow
- "One Night in N.Y.* by M.I.K.E. (alias of Mike Dierickx)
- "One Night in NYC" by The Horrorist
- "One Sheridan Square" by Charles Lloyd, The Chico Hamilton Quartet
- "One To 31" by J Live
- "One-Two-Five (Main Street, Harlem, USA)" by Kurtis Blow
- "Only In New York" by Jeanine Tesori and Dick Scanlan from the musical Thoroughly Modern Millie
- "The Only Living Boy in New York" by Simon & Garfunkel and covered by Everything but the Girl
- "Onyx Club Spree" by Stuff Smith
- "Opportunity" by Will Powers
- "Orange Blossom Special" by Johnny Cash
- "The Orange, White and Blue" by Victor Herbert
- "Ornette In New York" by Guy Barker
- "Orphan Of The Storm" by Black 47
- "Our Lady of the Bronx" by Black 47
- "Our Little Tree In The Park" by written by Rodgers and Hart
- "Our Lives" by The Blue Nile
- "Our Manhattan Moment" by Stan Ridgway
- "Our New York State of Mind" by Eric Van Der Westen's Quadrant Extended
- "Our Penthouse On Third Avenue" by Tommy Dorsey
- "Out of Habit" by Ani Difranco
- "Out On Fire Island" by Terrell Company
- "Outside A Small Circle Of Friends" by Phil Ochs
- "Over Fire Island" by Brian Eno
- "Over The Brooklyn Bridge" by Pino Donaggio
- "Overlooking Brooklyn" by Holy Ghost Tent Revival

== P ==
- "Pacifics" by Digable Planets
- "Palace Sign" by Adrian Gurvitz
- "Palesteena" by Con Conrad & J. Russell Robinson
- "Palisades Park" by Freddy Cannon
- "Palladium" by Weather Report (about the Palladium Ballroom)
- "Palladium Punch" by Ralph Flanagan
- "Tin Pan Alley" by Richard Adler and Jerry Ross
- "Pan In Manhattan" by Designer (soca)
- "Panic in Central Park" by Yo La Tengo
- "Panic on 5th Avenue" by Triumvirat
- "Paninaro" by Pet Shop Boys
- "Paper Boats" by Nada Surf
- "Paradise Garage" by Tim Curry
- "Paramount (235 West 46th St.) by Luiz Bonfá
- "Para-New-York" by Dolbie Stéréo
- "Paranoia Blues" by Paul Simon
- "Paree's A Branch Of Broadway" music by Max Hoffmann; lyrics by George Bronson-Howard and Harold Atteridge
- "Parigi Londra New York" by Filipponio (has entry on Italian wikipedia)
- "Paris – New York" by Space
- "Paris-New York, N.Y.-Paris" by Jacques Higelin
- "Paris Nights/New York Mornings" by Corinne Bailey Rae
- "Park Avenue" by Girls Against Boys
- "Park Avenue" by Lou Johnson
- "Park Avenue" by Paul Williams
- "Park Avenue Blues" by The Wind in the Willows
- "Park Avenue Fantasy" by Paul Whiteman
- "Park Avenue Mambo" by Xavier Cugat
- "Park Avenue Petite" by Art Farmer & Benny Golson
- "Park Avenue Rag" by David Chesky
- "Park Avenue Strut" (music by Phil Baker and Maurice Rubens; lyrics by Harold Atteridge and Moe Jaffe)
- "Park Avenue Waltz" by Charlie Chaplin
- "Park Concert" by Harry Geller And His Orchestra
- "Park Slope" by Dean Wareham and Britta Phillips
- "Parker's Band" by Steely Dan
- "The Payback" by James Brown
- "P.E. 2000" by Puff Daddy
- "Peace To New York" by Doug E. Fresh
- "Pearl of Broadway" by Jerome Kern, Bert Kalmar and Harry Ruby
- "Pedro Navaja" by Rubén Blades & Willie Colón
- "Pelham Parkway" by Elton Dean, Tony Bianco, Jon Wilkinson
- "Penguin At The Big Apple" by The Trammps
- "Penguin At The Waldorf" by Frankie Carle
- "Penguins On Broadway" by Hellmut Hattler
- "Penn Station" by Steps Ahead
- "Penn Station Rag" by David Chesky
- "Penn Station Transition/We Love You, Conrad!" (from the musical Bye Bye Birdie)
- PEnnsylvania 6-5000 by Jerry Gray and Carl Sigman
- "Penny and Me" by Hanson
- "Penthouse Serenade" by Marianne Faithfull
- "Penthouse Two (357 East 57)" by Steve Venet
- "People From Manhattan" by Guillermo McGill Quartet
- "People Who Died" by Jim Carroll
- "The Peppermint Twist" by Danny Peppermint and the Jumping Jacks
- "Peppermint Twist" by Joey Dee and the Starliters
- "Perdu Dans New York" by Gilbert Montagné
- "Perfect Day" by Lou Reed
- "The Phantom Who Haunts Broadway" by Yo La Tengo
- "A Photographer in New York" by Gilad Atzmon
- "Piazza, New York Catcher" by Belle and Sebastian
- "Pike Street" by Earl Slick
- "Pike Street – Park Slope" by Harvey Danger
- "P.I.M.P." by 50 Cent
- "Pincus the Peddler" by Benny Bell
- "The Place Where We Dwell" by Gang Starr
- "Planet Rock" by Afrika Bambaataa and the Soulsonic Force
- "Please Don't Monkey with Broadway" (from the musical Broadway Melody of 1940)
- "Please, Miss Giry, I Want to Go Back" (from the musical Love Never Dies)
- "Poem to a Horse" by Shakira
- "Poet In New York (Freedom Jazz Dance)" by Ben Sidran
- "The Police Of New York" by Irving Berlin
- "Pompton Turnpike" by Charlie Barnet
- "Poo Poo La La" by Roy Ayers
- "Poor Old Dad in New York for the Summer" from 'A Broken Idol' (lyrics by Harry Williams)
- "Poplar Street Blues" by Isham Jones Orchestra
- "Poses" by Rufus Wainwright
- "Positively 4th Street" by Bob Dylan
- "Postcard to New York" by Movieland
- "Poster Girl" by Backstreet Boys
- "Postmark, N.Y.C." by Phoenix
- "Potter's Field" by Tom Waits
- "Power Move" by Derek B
- "Practically Fifth Avenue" by Fastbuck
- "Premier and the Guru" by Gang Starr
- "The Prince Of Central Park" from Prince of Central Park
- "Princess of Little Italy" by Little Steven & The Disciples Of Soul
- "Princeton Avenue" by Issues
- "Theme From 'Prisoner Of Second Avenue'" by James Last
- "Próbatánc A Broadway-N" by Locomotiv GT
- "Prospect Park" by John Lee & Gerry Brown
- "Public Enemy #1" by Public Enemy
- "Pump Me Up" by Trouble Funk
- "Pump Up New York " by Mr Lee
- "Punk Rock Club" by The Unlovables
- "Pursuit on 53rd Street" by The Doobie Brothers
- "Puttin' on the Ritz" by Irving Berlin
- "Put On Your Sunday Clothes" (from the musical Hello, Dolly!), performed by Michael Crawford and Barbra Streisand

== Q ==
- "Q.U. – Hectic" by Mobb Deep
- "Que Pasa, New York?" by Elephant's Memory featuring John Lennon
- "The Queen of Lower Chelsea" by The Gaslight Anthem
- "Queens" by Infamous Mobb featuring Prodigy
- "Queens" by Pharoahe Monch
- "Queens Get the Money" by Nas
- "Queens Is" by LL Cool J featuring Prodigy
- "Queens Is Fresh" by High Power
- "Queens, NY" by 50 Cent
- "Queens Plaza" by Eric Leeds
- "A Queens Story" by Nas
- "Queensboro Bridge" by David Mead
- "Quincy Street Stomp" by Sidney Bechet

== R ==
- "Radio City" by Harry Geller And His Orchestra
- "Radio City Music Hall" (from Pieces of Eight musical; 1959)
- "Radio Free Brooklyn" by Pete Miser
- "Radio Musicola" by Nik Kershaw
- "Rainbow Over Harlem" by Roland Hanna
- "Rain In N.Y. City" by Tangerine Dream
- "Rainin' In New York" by Lonnie Mack
- "Raining In New York" by Oh Laura
- "A Rainy Day In New York City" by Martin Briley
- "Rainy Night In New York" by Yo La Tengo
- "Raised By Bats" by Aurelio Voltaire
- "Ragga House (All Night Long)" by Simon Harris & Daddy Freddy
- "The Rajah Of Broadway" by Maurice Levi and Harry B. Smith
- "R.A.M.O.N.E.S." by Motörhead
- "Ramshackle Day Parade" by Joe Strummer and the Mescaleros
- "Randall's Island" by Ray Anthony
- "Rap Machine" by Whodini
- "Rapper's Delight" by Sugarhill Gang
- "Rastafari On Wall Street" by Lee "Scratch" Perry
- "Rastaman In New York" by Mystic Revealers
- "Rats in the Cellar" by Aerosmith
- "Ravenswood House" by N.Y. House'n Authority
- "Ready Or Not" by Fugees
- "The Real Coney Island" (from the musical On the Town)
- "Real Rock & Roll Don't Come From New York" by The Gizmos
- "Rebel Without a Pause" by Public Enemy
- "Rebirth of Cool" by Digable Planets
- "Red Cab to Manhattan" by Stephen Bishop
- "Red Dragon Tattoo" by Fountains of Wayne
- "Red Light, Green Light" by Diamond D & The Psychotic Neurotics
- "Reflections N.Y.C." by Jonathan Cain
- "Reggae Christmas" by Bryan Adams
- "Reggae on Broadway" by Bob Marley
- "Rego Park Blues" by Ronnie Earl
- "Relaxin' At Sugar Ray's" by Erroll Garner
- "Remember Manhattan" by Richard Marx
- "Rene and Georgette Magritte with Their Dog After the War" by Paul Simon
- "Rent" by Jonathan Larson, from the musical Rent
- "Rent" by Pet Shop Boys
- "Respiration" by Black Star featuring Common
- "Return To New York" by Arthur Baker
- "Return to Spanish Harlem" by Tony Middleton
- "Reunion In Harlem" by Joe Marsala
- "Reverie" by The Morning Of
- "Rhapsody in Blue" by George Gershwin (inspired by the sounds and motions of a locomotive leaving Grand Central Station)
- "Rich Ah Getting Richer" by Rebel MC
- "The Rich People Of Brooklyn" by Sammy Kaye
- "Ride Through the Night" (from the musical Subways Are for Sleeping)
- "Riding On A Train In Brooklyn" by Cassio Ware
- "Riding On 52nd Street" by Coleman Hawkins
- "Riding On The D Train" by Oregon
- "Riffin' at 24th Street" by Illinois Jacquet And His Orchestra
- "The Right Profile" by The Clash
- "Rhinestone Cowboy" by Glen Campbell
- "Rhumba At The Waldorf" by Xavier Cugat
- "Rhumboogie" by Andrews Sisters
- "Rhythm Of The Broadway Moon" by Noble Sissle
- "Rhythm's OK In Harlem" by Ambrose
- "Richmond" by The Faces
- "Ride in Central Park" by Mort Shuman
- "Riding to New York" by Passenger
- "Riffin' At The Ritz" by Benny Goodman
- "Rikers Island" by Cocoa Tea
- "Rikers Island" by Family Dogg
- "Rikers Island" by Kool G Rap & DJ Polo
- "Rio Manhattan" by Hidehiko 'Sleepy' Matsumoto (Japanese saxophonist)
- "The Rising" by Bruce Springsteen
- "Rising To The Top" by Krs-One & Marley Marl
- "The River" by Andre Kostelanetz (From 'Hudson River Suite')
- "The River Hudson" by Red Alert
- "Riverside Drive" by Achim Reichel (in German, lyrics by poet Jörg Fauser)
- "Riverside Drive" by Frank H. Grey and Bide Dudley
- "Riverside Drive" by Gregg Karukas
- "Riverside Drive" from Jimmy
- "Riverside Drive" by Kim Waters
- "Riverside Drive" by Pepper Adams-Knepper Quintet
- "Riverside Drive" by Peter Wolf
- "Riverside Park" by Chuck Mangione, Livingston Taylor etc.
- "Robinson Crusoe in New York" by The Silencers
- "Robot New York" by Add N To (X)
- "Rock City" by Bernard Lavilliers
- "Rock'n'Roll City" by Kim Larsen
- "Rock The Bells (Of Saint Mary)" by 2 In A Room
- "Rock Your Body Rock" by Ferry Corsten
- "Rockaway" by Christine Lavin
- "Rockaway" by Don Robertson
- "Rockaway" by Donald Byrd & John Jenkins
- "Rockaway" by John Jenkins
- "Rockaway" by Nick Gilder
- "Rockaway" by Race
- "Rockaway" by Rick Ocasek
- "Rockaway Baby" by The Happy Six (organised by Harry Yerkes)
- "Rockaway Beach" by Brazzaville
- "Rockaway Beach" by The Ramones
- "Rockaway Blues" by Danny Cobb
- "Rockaway Playland" by Kelly Troy
- "Rockaway Reeds" by Phoenix
- "Rockaway to Sunset" by Spyro Gyra
- "Rockers NYC" by The Bronx
- "Rockin' Around in NYC" by Marshall Crenshaw
- "Rockin' the Bronx" by Black 47
- "Roll Call: Bronxwood Productions" by DJ Chuck Chillout
- "(Rolling Down Bowling Green) On a Little Two-Seat Tandem" (from the musical 'Mother Wore Tights')
- "Romeo Had Juliette" by Lou Reed
- "Ronnie Siegel From Avenue L" by Barry Goldberg
- "Room In Brooklyn" by John Squire
- "A Room In New York" by Lizzy Mercier Descloux
- "Rose Of Birdland" by Paul Quinichette
- "Rose Of Washington Square" by Red Nichols
- "Roseland Shuffle" by Count Basie
- "Roseland Taxi Dancer" by Danny O'Keefe
- "Route 95" by Eddie Gale
- "Roxanne '97" by Puff Daddy & Sting
- "The Royal Scam" by Steely Dan
- "Rubens On Broadway" (music by Gus Edwards, lyrics by Paul West)
- "The Rumble of the Subway" from Mary Jane McKane
- "Rump Shaker" by Wreckx-n-Effect
- "Runyonland" from the musical Guys and Dolls
- "Rush" by Black Moon

== S ==
- "Safe in New York City" by AC/DC
- "Saga of New York" by The Rascals
- "St Mark's & Third" by Susanna Smith
- "Sally Can't Dance" by Lou Reed
- "Sally's Got a Friend in New York City" by Larry McCray
- "Salmon Fishing In New York" by Orange Juice
- "A Salute to Harlem" by Boots & His Buddies
- "Same Ol' Thing" by A Tribe Called Quest
- "Sarajevo, New York, Roma" by Emir & Frozen Camels
- "Satin Manhattan Lady" by Society Of Seven
- "Saturday Gigs" by Mott The Hoople
- "Saturday in the Park" by Chicago
- "Saturday Night in Central Park" by Guy Lombardo & His Royal Canadians
- "Savoy" by Lucky Millinder
- "Savoy Blues" by Louis Armstrong
- "Savoy Strut" by Duke Ellington
- "Sax Fifth Avenue" by Ian McDonald
- "Sax Fifth Avenue" by Johnny Beecher
- "Sax in Harlem" by Master Jay
- "Say Goodbye to Christopher" by Jeb Loy Nichols
- "Say It Loud – I'm Black and I'm Proud" by James Brown (full version)
- "Say Young Man Of Manhattan" by Vincent Youmans, Clifford Grey and Harold Adamson
- "Scandal In New York" by Satoshi Tomiie Presents Ice
- "Scenes from a Madison Avenue Office" by Gregory Gray
- "Scenes from an Italian Restaurant" by Billy Joel
- "Scenes from the City" by Charles Mingus
- "School Is Out" by Gary U.S. Bonds
- "Schuyler Sisters" from the musical Hamilton
- "Sci-Fi Wasabi" by Cibo Matto
- "Scrapple from the Apple" by Charlie Parker
- "Scream in the Night" by Garland Jeffreys
- "Sebastian" by Cockney Rebel
- "Second Avenue" by Art Garfunkel
- "Second Avenue" by Horslips
- "Second Avenue" by No Justice
- "Second Avenue and 12th Street Rag" by Vernon Duke and Ogden Nash
- "Second Avenue Blue" by Buddy Rich
- "Second Avenue Scene" by Robert Maxwell
- "Second Avenue Square Dance" by Abe Ellstein Orchestra
- "Second Hand Rose" by Fanny Brice, covered by Barbra Streisand
- "The Secret to New York" by We The Kings
- "Seeing New York in the Rubber-Neck Hack" by John Walter Bratton and Paul West
- "Self Evident" by Ani Difranco
- "Senorita De Brooklyn" by Lord Nelson (calypso)
- "September in New York" by Gabrielle Goodman
- "Session at Riverside" Charlie Shavers
- "Seven One Eight" by FannyPack
- "Seventh Avenue" by John Kaizan Neptune
- "Seventh Avenue" by Orville Stoeber
- "Seventh Avenue" by Randy Edelman
- "Seventh Avenue" by Ratt
- "Seventh Avenue" by Rosanne Cash
- "Seventh Avenue" by Trummy Young
- "Seventh Avenue" by Victor Lewis
- "Seventh Avenue Express" by Count Basie
- "Seventh Avenue Rag" by David Chesky
- "Shade 45 Freestyle" by The Game
- "Shadows on the Streets of New York" by Joe Bouchard
- "Shattered" by The Rolling Stones
- "She Is the Belle of New York" (from the musical The Belle of New York)
- "She Was Hot" by Rolling Stones
- "She'll Drive the Big Car" by David Bowie
- "She'll Marry Hoggenheimer of Park Lane..." from The Girl from Kays
- "She's a Bombshell from Brooklyn" by Xavier Cugat
- "She's a Latin from Manhattan" by Al Jolson
- "She's Crafty" by Beastie Boys
- "She's The Mother of Broadway Rose" music by Jean Schwartz; lyrics by Harold Atteridge
- "Sheena Is a Punk Rocker" by Ramones
- "The Sheik of Avenue B" by Frank Crumit
- "A Sheridan Square" by Red Allen
- "Sherry Darling" by Bruce Springsteen
- "Shine On (Der Regen von New York)" by Howard Carpendale
- "Sh*t Iz Real" by Shyheim
- "Shortbus" by Yo La Tengo
- "The Show" by Doug E. Fresh and the Get Fresh Crew
- "The Shroud of New York" by The Cravats
- "Shubert Alley" by Robert Freeman
- "Shubert Alley Overture (Opening Night)" by Harry Geller And His Orchestra
- "Shubi Duwa" by Gian Marco
- "Shy" by Ani Difranco
- "Sidewalks of Manhattan" by Kai Winding Trombones
- "The Sidewalks of New York" by James W. Blake and Charles B. Lawlor (1890, used as a presidential campaign tune in the 1920s), performed by Duke Ellington, Cannonball Adderley, and others
- "Siento" by Fania All-Stars feat. Héctor Lavoe
- "Silence of the City" by Danny Jones from McFLY
- "Silver Bells" performed by Bing Crosby and others
- "Silvertown Blues" by Mark Knopfler
- "Simon Says" by Pharoahe Monch
- "Singin' in Central Park" by David Ippolito
- "Sinking and Swimming on Long Island" by Bayside
- "Sister Theresa's East River Orphanage" by The Fabulous Farquahr, The Buffoons
- "Six AM In Yorkville," BFK, Thesis/Antithesis
- "Six Men in New York" by Taxxi
- "Six Queens" by Larrikin love
- "Six-Thirty, Sunday Morning" by Peter Allen
- "Sixth Avenue" by Cedar Walton
- "Sixth Avenue Express" by Pete Johnson & Albert Ammons
- "Sixth Avenue Heartache" by The Wallflowers
- "Sixth Avenue Stroll" by Freddie McCoy
- "Sirens" by Nell Bryden covered by Cher
- "Skanhattan" by The Skatalites
- "Skanking on Broadway" by Barrington Levy
- "Skating in Central Park" by Francis Lai
- "Sketches Of NYC" by Nublu Orchestra conducted by Butch Morris
- "Skyscraper Blues" by Tony Bennett
- "Skylines and Turnstiles" by My Chemical Romance
- "Slam" by Onyx
- "Slaughter on Tenth Avenue" by Richard Rodgers performed by Mick Ronson and others
- "Slaughter on the 125th Street" by Milt Buckner
- "Slaughterhouse" by Joe Budden
- "Slaves of Broadway" from Greenwich Village Follies of 1928
- "Sleepy Manhattan" by George Shearing Quintet
- "Slow Bus Movin' (Howard Beach Party)" by Fishbone
- "Slum Goddess" by The Fugs
- "Slumming on Park Avenue" composed by Irving Berlin, performed by Jimmie Lunceford, Fletcher Henderson, Mildred Bailey, and others
- "Small Talk at 125th and Lenox" by Gil Scott-Heron
- "Smashing N.Y. Times" (from the musical Applause)
- "Smile" by Will Powers
- "Smile" by Tamer Hosny feat. Shaggy
- "Smooth" by Santana feat. Rob Thomas
- "Smooth Operator" by Big Daddy Kane
- "Snowed In at Wheeler Street" by Kate Bush
- "Snowin' in Brooklyn" by Ferron
- "The Snows of New York" by Chris de Burgh
- "So Far Around the Bend" by The National ("Now there's no leaving New York")
- "So Much to Do in New York" (from the musical Song and Dance)
- "So N.Y." by Fabolous
- "Soft Smoke" by The Pink Spiders
- "Someone" by SWV featuring Puff Daddy
- "Someplace Called Manhattan" by John Durrill (former of The Ventures)
- "Sometimes I Rhyme Slow" by Nice & Smooth
- "Somewhere Between Old and New York" by Steve Warriner
- "Somewhere in Brooklyn" by Bruno Mars
- "Somewhere On Broadway" (music and lyrics by E. Ray Goetz; lyrics by Glen MacDonough and Harry Grattan)
- "Son of a New York Gun" by Gino Vannelli
- "Song for a Hunter College Graduate" (music: Jonathan Sheffer, lyrics: Howard Ashman)
- "Song For A New York Rainmaker" by Larry Coryell
- "Song for Black Sabbath's Second North American Tour" by The Mountain Goats
- "Song for Myla Goldberg" by The Decemberists
- "Song for Sharon" by Joni Mitchell
- "Song For The Lonely" by Cher
- "Sort of Like Being Pumped" by Bomb the Music Industry!
- "Soul Power" by James Brown
- "Soul Sister In Harlem" by Pizzicato Five
- "The Sound of New York" by Kenyon Hopkins
- "Sounds from the Hudson" by Herbert L. Clarke
- "Sounds of New York" by Vertical Hold
- "South 2nd" by CocoRosie
- "South Bronx" by Boogie Down Productions
- "South Bronx Burnout" by Tribal Son
- "Southbound Jericho Parkway" by Roy Orbison
- "South of New York" by Johnny James
- "Soweto To Harlem" by Hal Singer Jazz Quartet
- "The Space Queens (Silky is Sad) by Lotti Golden
- "Spanish Harlem" by Andy McCoy
- "Spanish Harlem" by Jerry Leiber & Phil Spector, recorded by Ben E. King (covered by Aretha Franklin and The Mamas & the Papas)
- "Spanish Harlem" by Tony Touch
- "Spanish Harlem Incident" by Bob Dylan
- "Sparkling New York" by Bob James
- "The Spirit of Jazz" by The Gaslight Anthem
- "Spring in Manhattan" by Tony Bennett
- "Spring in New York" by Gilad Atzmon
- "Spring Street" by Dar Williams
- "Spring Street" by Vanessa Carlton
- "Springtime in New York" by Jonathan Richman
- "Springtime in the City" by Watsky
- "The Square"/"The Square In The Rain" by Michael Conway Baker
- "Squeeze the Trigger" by Ice-T
- "St. Bart's" by Lee Ritenour
- "St. Marks" by Ann Beretta
- "St. Mark's Place" by Earl Slick
- "St. Mark's Place" by Jeffrey Lee Pierce Sessions Project with Lydia Lunch
- "St. Mark's Place" by Kirsty McGee
- "St. Mark's Place" by Thomas Newman
- "Standing on Broadway (Watching the Girls)" by Roy Brown
- "Stars and the Moon" from the musical revue Songs for a New World by Jason Robert Brown
- "Stars of Broadway" from 'The Broadway Whirl' music: George Gershwin & Harry Tierney; lyrics: Richard Carle, Joseph McCarthy & John Henry Mears
- "The Start of Your Ending (41st Side)" by Mobb Deep
- "Staten Island" by Johnny McEvoy
- "Staten Island" by Kasso
- "Staten Island" by Shyheim
- "Staten Island Baby" by Black 47
- "Staten Island Groove" by Down to the Bone
- "Station on Third Avenue" by Marmalade
- "The Statue in the Bay" by Gene Autry
- "Statue of Liberty" by Armand Van Helden
- "Statue Of Liberty" by Burning Spear
- "Statue of Liberty" by Esperanto
- "The Statue of Liberty" by Gordon Jenkins
- "Statue Of Liberty" by Harry Geller And His Orchestra
- "Statue of Liberty" by Jill Sobule
- "Statue of Liberty" by Johnny "Guitar" Watson
- "Statue of Liberty" by Laurie Anderson
- "Statue of Liberty" by Little River Band
- "Statue of Liberty" by Pizzicato Five
- "Statue of Liberty" by River City
- "Statue of Liberty" by Turning Point
- "Statue of Liberty" by XTC
- "Statue of Liberty" by Yellowjackets
- "Stay Alive In NYC" by Memphis Bleek
- "Stayin' Alive" by Bee Gees
- "Steel Prayers – Ballad For 9/11 WTC" by Richie Beirach Trio
- "Step To Me" (Real Club Mix) by Mantronix
- "Step Into A World" by KRS-One
- "Stepking of Broadway" by Charleston Kids
- "Steppin' Out" by Joe Jackson
- "Stickman Crossing the Brooklyn Bridge" by Brooklyn Funk Essentials
- "Still New York" by Max Schneider
- "Stillman's Gym" (from the musical It's Always Fair Weather)
- "Stock Exchange" by Miss Kittin & The Hacker
- "Stolen Away on 55th & 3rd" by Dave Matthews Band
- "Stompin' at the Savoy" composed by Benny Goodman, Andy Razaf, Edgar Sampson, and Chick Webb
- "Stompin' at the Stork Club" by Robert Maxwell
- "The Stoop" by Little Jackie
- "Stop Shammin'" by Big Daddy Kane
- "Stop That Train" by Beastie Boys
- "Stop The Violence" by Boogie Down Productions
- "Storm the Embassy" by Stray Cats
- "Straight and True" by Stan Rogers
- "Straight from Queens" by LL Cool J
- "Straight Outta Q.B." by Cormega, Jungle & Blaq Poet
- "Straight To Brad's Head From New York" by Delroy Wilson
- "Stranded in Chelsea" by Nick Holmes (recorded with The Serendipity Singers)
- "Strange Apparatus (An Englishman in New York)" by Godley and Creme
- "Strange Powers" by The Magnetic Fields
- "Street Dance" by Break Machine
- "Street in Manhattan" by Frank De Vol
- "Street in New York" by Shabby Tiger
- "Streets of Chinatown" by Notorious MSG
- "Streets of Little Italy" by Bonnie Tyler
- "Streets Of Manhattan" by Pino Donaggio
- "Streets of New York" by Alicia Keys
- "Streets of New York" by Clint Mansell
- "The Streets of New York" by Elliott Murphy
- "Streets of New York" by Hugh Masakela
- "Streets of New York" by Kool G Rap & DJ Polo
- "Streets of New York" by The Wolfe Tones
- "Streets of New York" by Willie Nile
- "The Streets of New York (In Old New York)" (from the operetta The Red Mill)
- "Streets of NY" by Terror Squad
- "Streets of Soho" by Antje Duvekot
- "Streets of the Bronx" by Brother Jack McDuff
- "The Streets of Your Town" by Country Joe and the Fish
- "Strong Island" by Rakim
- "Strut Miss Lizzie" by Henry Creamer
- "Struttin' Down Jane Street" by Winifred Atwell
- "Struttin' on Broadway" by Masayoshi Takanaka
- "Studio 54" by Blondie
- "Studio 54" by Major Bill Smith & Zane & Hogan
- "Studio 54 Dub" by Mad Professor
- "Studying New York C. 1928" by Lee Johnson
- "Stutter Rap" by Morris Minor & The Majors
- "Stuyvesant Blues" by Max Kaminsky
- "Sub-Manhattan Blues" by Bob Thompson
- "Subrosa Subway" by Klaatu
- "Subway 6" by Dave Valentin
- "Subway Funeral" by Thursday
- "Subway Joe" by Joe Bataan
- "Subway Polka" by Harry Geller And His Orchestra
- "Subway Ride/Imaginary Coney Island" (from the musical On the Town)
- "The Subway" by Chappell Roan
- "The Subway Song" from Make Mine Manhattan
- "Subway: The Last 'I Love New York' Song" (from the musical Mayor)
- "Subway Train" by the New York Dolls
- "The Subway Train That Came To Life" by The Third Rail (featuring Rusty Evans from The Deep)
- "Subways Are for Sleeping" (from the musical Subways Are for Sleeping)
- "Sucker M.C.'s" by Run–D.M.C.
- "Suffragette City" by David Bowie
- "Sugar Hill" by AZ
- "Sugar Hill" by Kenny Burrell
- "Sugar Hill" by Three Sounds
- "Sugar Hill Function" by Henry "Red" Allen and his Orchestra
- "Sugar Hill Groove" by Sugarhill Gang
- "Sudamericano en Nueva York" by Mercedes Sosa
- "Suicide (A Better Way)" by Choking Victim
- "Suite Revenge: 'Striking Back'/'Riverside Park'/'The Alley'/'Last Stop'/'8th Avenue Station'" by Herbie Hancock
- "Sullivan Street" by Counting Crows
- "A Sultry Day in New York" by Dennis Wilson Quartet
- "Summer in Brooklyn" by Joell Ortiz
- "Summer in El Barrio" by Bodega Bamz
- "Summer in El Barrio" by Felix Cavaliere
- "Summer in Central Park" by Horace Silver
- "Summer in New York" by The Imaginations
- "Summer in New York" by Janis Ian
- "Summer in New York" by Michael Franks
- "Summer in New York (Wander With The Wind)" by Five Satins
- "Summer in New York" by Sofi Tukker
- "Summer in the City" by The Lovin' Spoonful
- "Summer in the City" by Regina Spektor
- "Summer Night in Spanish Harlem" by Little Louie Vega
- "Summertime in New York" by Exuma
- "Summertime in New York" by Mick Harvey
- "Summertime on 42nd Street" by The Firm
- "Sunday at the Savoy" by Count Basie
- "Sunday in New York" by Carroll Coates and Peter Nero, performed by Ernestine Anderson, Bobby Darin, Mel Tormé, and others
- "Sunday Morning In Manhattan" by Eberhard Schoener
- "Sunday Morning New York Blue" by Rob Thomas
- "Sunday New York Times" by Matt Nathanson
- "Sunday School to Broadway" by Anne Murray
- "Sunkeneyed Girl" by Mike Doughty
- "Sunrise in New York City" by Willie Nile
- "Sunrise On The Bronx" by André Popp
- "Sunset in New York" by Arabesque
- "Sunset Over Broadway" by Roy Buchanan
- "Sunset Over Manhattan" by Alex Bugnon
- "Sunshine Partytime" by Rockers Revenge
- "Super Subway Comedian" by Suicide
- "Super Womanhattan" by Michel Laurent
- "Super Womble" by The Wombles
- "Superbad Superslick" by Redhead Kingpin and the F.B.I.
- "Superthug" by Noreaga
- "Sure Shot" by Beastie Boys
- "The Surfer" by Vampire Weekend
- "Surfin' in Harlem" by Swamp Dogg
- "Surfin' USA" by Beach Boys
- "Surface Pressure" by Jessica Darrow
- "Sutphin Boulevard" by Blood Orange
- "Sutton Lights" by Kenyon Hopkins
- "Sutton Place" by George Gershwin
- "Swan Song On Broadway" by Western Eyes
- "Swear to God" by Emilyn Brodsky
- "Swing Time Up in Harlem" by Tommy Dorsey
- "Swingin' At Sugar Ray's" by Baby Face Willette
- "Swingin' at the Copper Rail" by Buck Clayton
- "Swinging at the Cotton Club" by Cantabile
- "Swingin' at the Hickory House" by Wingy Manone & his Orchestra
- "Swingin' at the Met" by Les Brown
- "Swingin' Down Broadway" by Jo Stafford
- "Swinging At Seventh" by Bobby Adams Quintet
- "Swinging In Harlem" by Erskine Hawkins and his 'Bama State Collegians
- "Swinging On Lenox Avenue" by Erskine Hawkins and his Orchestra

== T ==
- "Tacuma Song – Movement 3 – Celebration On Prince Street" by Jamaaladeen Tacuma
- "Take a Walk with the Fleshtones" by The Fleshtones
- "Take It to the Bronx" by Tony Touch
- "Take It To The Streets" by Rampage
- "Take Manhattan" by Soul Asylum
- "Take Me Back NYC" by Herman Düne
- "Take Me Back to Manhattan" by Cole Porter (from The New Yorkers and Anything Goes)
- "(Take Me To) New York City" by Lamar Thomas
- "Take Me Back to New York Town" by Andrew B. Sterling and Harry Von Tilzer
- "Take Me To Broadway" (from Small Town Girl)
- "Take Me to the Bridge" by Vera
- "Take That Look Off Your Face" by Andrew Lloyd Webber (from the musical Song and Dance)
- "Take the "A" Train" by Billy Strayhorn, the signature tune of Duke Ellington
- "Take the Country to New York City" by Bohannon
- "Take the L Train (To Brooklyn)"/"Take The L Train (To 8 Ave)" by Brooklyn Funk Essentials
- "Take Them to the Traitors' Gate" by Thinkman
- "Take Your Partner by the Hand" by Howie B featuring Robbie Robertson
- "Takin' of Pelham One Two Three" by David Shire
- "Talk of New York" by Zonophone Orchestra
- "Talk on Indolence" by The Avett Brothers
- "Talkin' Baseball (Willie, Mickey & the Duke)" by Terry Cashman
- "Talkin' Baseball (Baseball and the Mets)" by Terry Cashman
- "Talkin' Baseball" (The Bambino, the Clipper and the Mick) Yankee Version" by Terry Cashman
- "Talkin' Big Apple '75" by Loudon Wainwright III
- "Talkin' New York" by Bob Dylan (from his eponymous album)
- "Talking Vietnam Potluck Blues" by Tom Paxton
- "Tammany" by Barry Mann and Al Gorgoni
- "Tan Manhattan" by Bobby Short
- "Tango In Harlem" by Touch And Go
- "Tap The Bottle" by Young Black Teenagers
- "Tardis To Brooklyn" by Bang The Future
- "Tarzan of Harlem" by Cab Calloway
- "Tavern on the Green" by Chic
- "Main Title–Taxi Driver" (theme from movie Taxi Driver) by Bernard Herrmann
- "Techno Funk" by Lost
- "Tema De Broadway" by Joe Quijano
- "The Ten Commandments Of Madison Avenue" by Louis Nye
- "The Tenderloin Celebration" (from Tenderloin)
- "Tenement Symphony" by Tony Martin
- "Tenth and Greenwich (Women's House of Detention)" by Melvin Van Peebles
- "Tenth Avenue" by Patrick Williams
- "Tenth Avenue Tango" by Bruce Willis
- "Terror (September 11th)" by Jimmy Cliff
- "The Wild Style" (Supreme Ego Mix) by DJ Supreme (aka Space Cowboy)
- "Thank the Lord for New York City" by Sandy Posey
- "Thank You, Lord, for Sending Me the F Train" by Mike Doughty
- "Thank You, New York" by Chris Thile
- "That Bowery Song" by Babyshambles
- "That Harlem Express" by Tom Talbert Orchestra
- "That's Broadway" (from Bright Lights of 1944)
- "That's the Way We Do things In New Yawk" by Jelly Roll Morton
- "That's What Harlem Is to Me" (from the musical revue Bubbling Brown Sugar)
- "That's What the Well-Dressed Man in Harlem Will Wear" by Irving Berlin
- "That's What Sends Men To The Bowery" by Reparata and the Delrons
- "That's Where I Am" by Maggie Rogers
- "Theme for New York City (Based on Prelude No. 4)" by Idris Muhammad
- "Theme from 'Escape from New York'" by John Carpenter
- "Theme from 'Mr Broadway'" by Dave Brubeck
- "Theme from New York, New York" written by Kander and Ebb; originally recorded by Liza Minnelli; famously sung by Frank Sinatra 1980
- "Theme from 'NYPD Blue'" by Mike Post
- "Then the Letting Go" by The Mountain Goats
- "There Was a Time – Echo of Harlem" by Eddie Harris
- "There You Have (Old) New York Town" (music and lyrics by Louis A. Hirsch)
- "There's a Boat Dat's Leavin' Soon for New York" from the opera Porgy and Bess by George Gershwin, Ira Gershwin, and Dubose Heyward and recorded by Louis Armstrong & Ella Fitzgerald, Carmen McRae & Sammy Davis Jr., Ernestine Anderson, Miles Davis, and many more
- "There's a Boy in Harlem" by Tommy Dorsey
- "There's a Broken Heart for Every Heart Light on Broadway" by Mel Torme
- "There's a House in Harlem for Sale" by Red Allen
- "There's A Little Bit Of Everything on Broadway" music by Harry Carroll and Sigmund Romberg; lyrics by Harold Atteridge
- "There's a Little Street in Heaven (That They Call Broadway)" by A. Baldwin Sloane and James T. Waldon
- "There's No Place Like New York" by Allen Toussaint
- "There's Nothing Like New York" by M.C. Beta
- "There's Rhythm In Harlem" by Mills Blue Rhythm Band
- "The Things Dreams Are Made Of" by Human League
- "Think We Got a Problem" by Sheek Louch
- "Third Avenue" by Clifford Jordan Big Band
- "Third Avenue El" by Vernon Duke and Ogden Nash
- "Third Avenue Rag" by David Chesky
- "Third Week in the Chelsea" by Jefferson Airplane
- "This Ain't New York" by Ian North
- "This Goes Out To My Brooklyn Crew" by Sauce Money featuring Jay-Z
- "This Is Crush Collision" by Age of Chance
- "This is My Town" by Barry Manilow and Bruce Sussman
- "This Is New York" by Lange Vs Gareth Emery
- "This Is New York" by Tirez Tirez
- "This Is Why I'm Hot" by Mims
- "This Island" by Le Tigre
- "This Island New York" by Nate Borofsky
- "This Land Is Your Land" by Woody Guthrie
- "This Mess We're In" by PJ Harvey (with Thom Yorke)
- "This Morning I Woke Up in New York City" by John Kelley
- "Thompkins Square Park" by E.O.L. Soulfrito
- "Thousands Are Sailing" by The Pogues
- "Three Boroughs" by X-ecutioners
- "Three MC's and One DJ" by Beastie Boys
- "Three Days in Manhattan" by Down to the Bone
- "Three Minutes on 52nd Street" by Lionel Hampton
- "Three Walking Songs" by Laurie Anderson
- "Throw Up Ya Gunz" by 2Pac
- "Tiffany Girl" music by E. Ray Goetz and Sigmund Romberg; lyrics by E. Ray Goetz
- "Tijuana Harlem" by Maxwell Davis & The Harlem Brass
- "Till the Next Goodbye" by Rolling Stones
- "Tillie of Longacre Square" music by James F. Hanley; lyrics by Harold Atteridge and Ballard MacDonald
- "Time and Space" by The Digable Planets
- "Times Square" by Barry Reynolds
- "Times Square" (from The Bunch and Judy)
- "Times Square" by Destroyer
- "Times Square" by Glue
- "Times Square" by Kenyon Hopkins
- "Times Square" by Link Bekka (this is an alias of Peter Daltrey)
- "Times Square" by Marianne Faithfull
- "Times Square" by Mike Mandel
- "Times Square" by Ornette Coleman
- "A Times Square" by Phil Moore
- "Times Square" by Sophia Knapp
- "The Times Square Arguments" music by Harry Carroll and Sigmund Romberg; lyrics by Harold Atteridge
- "Times Square Ballet" (from On the Town
- "Times Square Go-Go Boy" by East River Pipe
- "Times Square Heart" by Eddie Schwartz
- "Times Square Machine (N.Y.C. February 1991)" by Chris Whitley
- "Times Square Rag" by David Chesky
- "Times Square Rag" by Harry Roy
- "Time Squared" by Eric Leeds
- "Time Squared" by Yellowjackets
- "Tin Pan Alley" by Apples in Stereo
- "Tin Pan Alley" by Jerry Ross and Richard Adler
- "Tin Pan Alley" (a.k.a. "The Roughest Place in Town") by Jimmy Wilson
- "Tin Pan Alley Rag" by Jack Fina
- "Tina Toledo's Street Walkin' Blues" by Ryan Adams
- "Tinseltown to the Boogiedown" by Scritti Politti (mentions NYPD and the Boogiedown is The Bronx)
- "To a Broadway Rose" by Artie Shaw
- "To Birdland and Hurry" by Herbie Mann
- "To Get to You (55th & 3rd)" by Kenny Chesney
- "Token Back to Brooklyn" by They Might Be Giants
- "Tom Jones International" by Tom Jones
- "Tom's Diner" by Suzanne Vega
- "Tompkins Park" by Peter Daltrey
- "Tompkins Square" by The Harbingers
- "Tompkins Square Blues" by The Optic Nerve
- "Tompkins Square Park" by Chamaeleon Church
- "Tompkins Square Park" by Mumford & Sons
- "A Tone Parallel to Harlem" by Jazz in the Classroom
- "T.O.N.Y. (Top of New York)" by Capone-N-Noreaga featuring Tragedy Khadafi
- "Too Dumb for New York City" by Waylon Jennings
- "Too Late (New York City)" by Tycoon
- "Took Place in East New York" by Stetsasonic
- "Top of the World" – Shawn Mendes
- "The Touchables in Brooklyn" by Dickie Goodman
- "Townsend in the Square" by Michael Conway Baker
- "Toyan On Broadway" by Toyan
- "Train Kept-A-Rollin'" by Aerosmith
- "Train Under Water" by Bright Eyes
- "Transfiguration of Hiram Brown Suite" by Mose Allison
- "Tracie's Hideout" by Tracie Spencer
- "Transfer to Manhattan" by James Moody
- "The Treat of 42nd Street" by Gary Glitter
- "A Tree Grows in Brooklyn (Overture)" (from the musical A Tree Grows in Brooklyn)
- "A Tree That Grows in Brooklyn" (from Follow The Girls)
- "The Tremont Avenue Cruisewear Fashion Show" (music by Jerry Livingston; lyrics by Mack David)
- "Tres Leches (Triboro Trilogy)" by Big Punisher
- "Trial of Tears" by Dream Theater
- "Tribal Base" by Rebel MC
- "Tribeca" by A Certain Ratio
- "Tribeca" by Greg Adams
- "Tribeca" by Kenny G
- "Tribecca" by D'wayne Wiggins
- "The Tribes of New York" by Ornette Coleman
- "Triboro Drive" by Kenyon Hopkins
- "A Trip to New York" by Charlie Poole
- "A Trip to NYC" by Sleeping States
- "Trip" – Ella Mai
- "Triumph" by Wu Tang Clan
- "Trouble on the Westside" by Tony Touch featuring Slick Rick
- "Truckin' (They're Going Hollywood in Harlem)" by Martha Raye
- "The True Meaning" by Cormega
- "The Truth Ain't Pretty" by Steve Conte & The Crazy Truth
- "Trylon Swing" by Cab Calloway
- "T.S.O.B." by Master Jay & Michael Dee
- "Tuesday in New York" by Jon Mark/Mark-Almond
- "Tunnel of Love" by Dire Straits
- "Turn Me Loose on Broadway" (from the musical 'Two's Company')
- "Turtle Bay" by Herbie Mann
- "T.V. Land" by Vast Aire
- "Twelve Thirty (Young Girls Are Coming to the Canyon)" by The Mamas & the Papas
- "Twenty Years" by Augustana
- "Twilo Thunder" by Breeder
- "Twin Hype" by Twin Hype
- "Twist Twist" by The Chakachas
- "Twistin' at the Waldorf" by Don Meehan
- "Twistin' the Night Away" by Sam Cooke
- "Two Little Girls" by Ani DiFranco
- "Two Nobodies in New York" from the musical title of show
- "Two People from New York" by Terry Black & Laurel Ward
- "Two White Boys Watching James Brown at the Apollo" by David Grisman & Andy Statman

== U ==
- "UFO Over N.Y." by Guru Guru
- "Ugly Heart" by G.R.L.
- "Ugly New York" by Peter Wolf
- "U.M.M.G.(Upper Manhattan Medical Group)" by Duke Ellington
- "U.N. Building" by Harry Geller And His Orchestra
- "Un Caribe en Nueva York" by Ricardo Arjona
- "Un Día en Nueva York" by Los Hermanos Rosario
- "Un Ecureuil À Central Park" by Claude Nougaro
- "Un Oiseau Sur New-York" by Alec R. Costandinos
- "Un Rêve Plus Long Que la Nuit" by The Mountain Goats
- "Un Verano En Nueva York" by El Gran Combo de Puerto Rico
- "Un jour j'irai à New-York avec toi" by Téléphone
- "Una sera a New York" by Marcella Bella
- "Uncle In Harlem" by New Deal Rhythm Band
- "Under Pressure" (full version) by Queen & David Bowie
- "Under the 4th Street Bridge" by Bill Wolfer
- "Undercover of the Night" by Rolling Stones
- "Underground" by Jane's Addiction
- "Underground" by Versus
- "Underground Town" by The Toasters
- "Underneath the Harlem Moon" by Don Redman and his Orchestra
- "Unexpected Lover In N.Y." by T-Square
- "Unexplained" by Gravediggaz
- "Union Square" by Tom Waits
- "Unity" by Afrika Bambaataa & James Brown
- "Unity" by TheFatRat
- "Utopia Parkway" by Fountains Of Wayne
- "Utopia Pkwy" by Cul De Sac
- "Up All Night" by Alice Cooper (band)
- "Up and Down Lenox" by Mobstyle
- "Up Cherry Street" by Baja Marimba Band
- "Up in Central Park" by Al Goodman and his Orchestra
- "Up In Harlem" by Boys Choir of Harlem
- "Up in the Streets of Harlem" by the Drifters
- "Up on Fifth Avenue Near Central Park" by John Frederick Coots and Raymond W. Klages
- "Up on the Catwalk" by Simple Minds
- "Up on the Hudson Shore" by Al Jolson and Harold Atteridge
- "Upper Madison Avenue Blues" by Bobby Short
- "Upper Manhattan Medical Group" by Steve Kuhn Trio
- "Upper West Side" by King Princess
- "Upper West Side Story" by Bobby Broom
- "Uprock" by Rock Steady Crew
- "Uptight Manhattan" by David Peel
- "Uptown" by The Chambers Brothers
- "Uptown" by Joe Bataan
- "Uptown" by Lee Ritenour
- "Uptown Girl" by Billy Joel
- "Uptown New York" by Sherman Hunter
- "Urbania" by Nowomowa
- "Usa un Condón" by Miki González
- "Utica Ave. In Dub" by Sly and Robbie

== V ==
- "Vado a Nuova York" by Mecano
- "Val Jester" by The National
- "Valley Winter Song" by Fountains of Wayne
- "The Vampires of New York" by Marcy Playground
- "Vaudeville Ain't Dead/Catch Our Act at the Met" (from the musical revue Two on the Aisle)
- "Vecchio Jazz Di Broadway" by Mario Pezzotta E I Suoi Solisti
- "Venezuelan in New York" by King Changó
- "Venus" by Television
- "Venus of Avenue D" by Mink DeVille
- "Verdict on Judge Street" by Eddie Palmieri
- "Village Gait" by Yellowjackets
- "The Village in the Morning" by The Magnetic Fields
- "The Village of New York" (from the film Windjammer)
- "Village Voice Personal" by Shrug
- "Village Zoo" by Mark Colby
- "Violets for Your Furs" by Frank Sinatra
- "Vipers of Harlem" by Darryl Read
- "Visions of Johanna" by Bob Dylan

== W ==
- "W 86th" by Lee Konitz
- "Waiting for the B Train" by Christine Lavin
- "Wake up" by Hilary Duff
- "Wake up in New York" by Craig Armstrong
- "Walk Away (42nd Street)" by Shona Laing
- "Walk Fast Thru the Alleys of Harlem" by 18th Century Quartet
- "Walk from Regio's" by Isaac Hayes
- "Walk in N.Y" by Fabolous
- "Walk in New York" by Onyx
- "Walk on the Wild Side" by Lou Reed 1972
- "Walk the Dinosaur" by Was (Not Was)
- "Walkin' Down Broadway" by The Penguins
- "Walkin' in Central Park" by SPBR (featuring Patrice Rushen)
- "Walkin' in N.Y." by The Manhattan Transfer
- "Walkin' in New York" by Brenda Russell
- "Walking Down Broadway" by Betty Barnes
- "Walking Down Broadway" by Les Humphries
- "Walking Down Broadway" (from the musical film Strike Up the Band)
- "Walking Down Madison" by Kirsty MacColl
- "Walking in New York" by Leo Fuld
- "Walking Through Harlem" by Universal Messengers
- "Walking Through the Big Apple" by Michel Berger
- "Wall Street" from Dames at Sea
- "Wall Street" by La Familia
- "Wall Street" by Jackie Mittoo
- "Wall Street" by Michael Rose
- "Wall Street" by Simon Phillips
- "Wall Street" by Fat City
- "Wall Street" by Van Dyke Parks
- "Wall Street Blues" by Dolphin Jazz Band
- "Wall Street Bongo" by Yello
- "Wall Street Cha Cha" by Warren Covington
- "Wall Street Crash" by Chaos UK
- "Wall Street Lament" by Al Fairweather & Sandy Brown's All Stars
- "The Wall Street Part of Town" by Ry Cooder
- "Wall Street Rag" by Herb Alpert and the Tijuana Brass
- "Wall Street Rag" by Scott Joplin
- "Wall Street: Revisited" by Hewhocorrupts
- "Wall Street Rock" by Mikey Dread
- "The Wall Street Shuffle" by 10cc
- "Wall Street Shuffle" by The Melodians
- "Wall Street Village Day" by Four Seasons
- "Wall Street Wail" by Duke Ellington
- "Washington Square" by Counting Crows
- "Washington Square" by Fruitcake
- "Washington Square" by The Joneses
- "Washington Square" (music by Melville Gideon; lyrics by E. Ray Goetz and Cole Porter)
- "Washington Square" by Michael Conway Baker
- "Washington Square" by The Village Stompers
- "Washington Square At Night" by Deborah Holland
- "Washington Square Dance" by Irving Berlin
- "Washington Square Park" by The Wonder Years
- "The Washington Square Park Episode" by Alvin Batiste Jimmy Hamilton/John Carter/David Murray
- "Wasn't It Nice in New York City" by The Crickets
- "Watch the Closing Doors" by I.R.T. (Interboro Rhythm Team)
- "Watch Ya Mouth" by 2Pac
- "Watching Brooklyn" by Trent Dabbs
- "Watching The Big Apple Turn Over" by Carter The Unstoppable Sex Machine
- "Wawukhona Yini E New York" by Ladysmith Black Mambazo
- "Way Out West (On West End Avenue)" by Rodgers & Hart
- "Way Up in NYC" by Loudon Wainwright III
- "(We Are) New York Lightning" by The Voices of East Harlem
- "We Are Not Ashamed" by Carmen
- "We Are the Boys from the Bowery" by Ferko String Band
- "We Are the City" by Casey Neill
- "We Are Whodini" by Whodini
- "We Didn't Start the Fire" by Billy Joel
- "We Got the Juice" by Freeez
- "We're a Couple of Broadway Brothers" (from the musical Mother Wore Tights)
- "We're a Happy Family" by Ramones
- "We're Cleaning Up Broadway" by Rudolf Friml and Irving Caesar
- "We're The Crew" by Warzone
- "We're the Doormen of New York" by Al Stillman and Alan Moran
- "We've Come to the Copa" (from the musical comedy film Copacabana)
- "We've Got the Juice" by Derek B
- "We Left New York City" by Michael Shynes
- "We Like Birdland" by Huey "Piano" Smith
- "We Live in Brooklyn Baby" by Roy Ayers
- "We Need Jesus" by Petra
- "We Run N.Y." by Tony Touch
- "We Will Always Have New York" by John Wesley Harding
- "Welcome 2 Brooklyn" by M.O.P.
- "Welcome to Brooklyn" by Lil' Kim
- "Welcome to Brownsville" by M.O.P.
- "Welcome to Harlem" by Gary Toms Empire
- "Welcome to New York" by Leon Thomas
- "Welcome to New York" by Scott Klopfenstein
- "Welcome to New York" by Tim Mahoney
- "Welcome to New York" by Taylor Swift
- "Welcome to New York City" by Cam'Ron featuring Jay-Z and Juelz Santana
- "Welcome 2 No York" by Undah Dub & Breeze
- "Welcome To The Terrordome" by Public Enemy
- "Wenn es Nacht Wird in Harlem" by Marianne Rosenberg
- "Wenn New York Brennt" by Suzanne Doucet
- "Went To New York" by Boozoo Chavis
- "West 22nd Street Theme" by Bobby Hutcherson
- "West 42nd Street" by Deodato
- "West 43rd Street Blues" by Raphael Wressnig & Enrico Crivellaro Organ Combo (jazz)
- "West 45th" by Ari Ambrose Trio
- "West 46th Street" by Sonny Stitt & Barry Harris
- "West 107th Street" by Paul Bley & Paul Motian
- "West Broadway And 125th" by Fool Proof
- "West End Avenue" by Stephen Schwartz from the musical The Magic Show
- "West Indian In New York" by Young Killer
- "West On 27th" by Killahurtz
- "West Side Apartment" by Julie Budd
- "West Side Boogie" by Ray Gomez
- "West Side Encounter" by Salsoul Orchestra
- "West Side Nights" by Larry Fast
- "Westside Pow Wow" by Desmond Child
- "West Side Rock" by Big Apple Brass
- "Westside Story" by The Game
- "West Side Stomp" by Luiz Bonfá
- "What A Village Girl Should Know" music by Carlton Kelsey and Maurice Rubens; lyrics by Clifford Grey
- "Whatever Happened to New York?" by Ann Magnuson
- "What Harlem Is to Me" by Coleman Hawkins & The Ramblers
- "What More Do I Need?" by Stephen Sondheim
- "What New York Couples Fight About" by Morcheeba featuring Kurt Wagner
- "What New York Used to Be" by The Kills
- "What'd I Say" by Ray Charles
- "What's It All About by Run–D.M.C.
- "What's New in New York City" by Merle Haggard
- "When a Fellow Meets a Flapper (on Broadway)" (music by Phil Charig; lyrics by Irving Caesar)
- "When Broadway Was a Pasture" by Al Piantadosi and Joseph McCarthy
- "When I First Kissed You" by Extreme
- "When I'm Out with the Belle of New York" (from the musical The Belle of New York)
- "When Love Beckoned (On 52nd Street)" (from Du Barry Was a Lady)
- "When New York Was Irish" by Terence Winch
- "When Old New York Goes Dry" by Benjamin Hapgood Burt (from 'Cheer Up' music by Raymond Hubbell; lyrics by John Golden)
- "When the Circus Comes to New York" by Dick Haymes And Helen Forrest
- "When the Last Light Goes Out on Broadway" by Willie Nile
- "When the Moon Comes Over Madison Square" by Bing Crosby
- "When the Night is Long" – Shelby Merry
- "When the Revolution Comes" by The Last Poets
- "When the Stars Go Blue" by Ryan Adams
- "When the Whip Comes Down" by The Rolling Stones
- "When You Got to New York" by Saturday Looks Good to Me
- "When You're Far Away From New York Town" (from Jennie)
- "Where Broadway Meets Fifth Avenue" by Lester Keith and John Kemble (from Ludwig Englander and Harry B. Smith's 'The White Cat'.)
- "Where Brooklyn At?" by Notorious B.I.G.
- "Where I'm From" by Digable Planets
- "Where I'm From" by Jay-Z
- "Where Is My Little Old N.Y." by Irving Berlin
- "Where It All Started (NY)" by Hi-tek featuring Jadakiss, Papoose, Talib Kweli, and Raekwon
- "Where the Hudson River Flows", written by Rodgers and Hart
- "While the City Sleeps" (from the musical Golden Boy)
- "Where the Skies End" – Starset
- "The Whistling Bowery Boy" by Albert Whelan
- "White Boy With a Feather" by Jason Downs
- "Whitestone Bridge" by Tir Na Nog
- "Whizz Kid" by Mott the Hoople
- "Who Are You New York?" by Rufus Wainwright
- "Who Needs Manhattan" by Ahmad Jamal
- "Why" by Sabrina Carpenter
- "Why Should I Worry?" By Billy Joel
- "Why Take a Girl Down to Coney (Don't Take a Girl Down to Coney)" (music by Gus Edwards; lyrics by Will D. Cobb)
- "Wichita Lineman Was A Song I Once Heard" by The KLF
- "Wicked" by Ice Cube
- "Wild Cowboys In Bucktown" by O.G.C.
- "Wild Irish Rose" by George Jones
- "The Wild Style" by Time Zone
- "Williamsburg, Brooklyn" by Dan Melchior Und Das Menace
- "Williamsburg Will Oldham Horror" by Jeffrey Lewis
- "Wimpy Drives Through Harlem" by The Queers
- "The Wind In New York City" by Wendy Waldman
- "Wind of Change" by Bee Gees
- "Window Shopping On 5th Avenue" by Harry Geller And His Orchestra
- "The Winds Of New York City" by Tom Dooley And His Lovelights
- "Wings Over Manhattan" by Charlie Barnet and his Orchestra
- "Winter In Central Park" from Sweet Adeline
- "Winter In Manhattan" by The Accidentals
- "Winter in New York" (music: John Kander, lyrics: Fred Ebb)
- "Winter Night In NYC" by M.I.K.E.
- "Without A Doubt" by Black Sheep
- "WNBC" by Lenny Mac Dowell
- "The Wolf of Manhattan" by The Kingsmen
- "Wombling White Tie and Tails" by The Wombles
- "Wombling USA" by The Wombles
- "Women In New York" by Lord Kitchener
- "Wonce Again Long Island" by De La Soul
- "Woodside, Queens" by Juan Wauters
- "Work" by ASAP Ferg
- "Workin' for the MTA" by Justin Townes Earle
- "The World I Know" by Collective Soul
- "The World Is A Ghetto" by Geto Boys
- "World's Fair" by Stranger Cole & Ken Boothe
- "World's Famous" by Malcolm McLaren
- "Wouldn't Have You Any Other Way (NYC)" by Elton John
- "WPLJ" by Hoodoo Rhythm Devils
- "Wrath of Kane" by Big Daddy Kane
- "Wreckx Shop" by Wreckx-n-Effect featuring Apache Indian
- "Written on the Subway Wall/Little Star" by Dion

== Y ==
- "The Yanks Are Back" by The Fowls
- "The Yanks Are The Champs" by The Fowls
- "Yeah! New York" by Yeah Yeah Yeahs
- "Yella!" by Yella (produced by members of Tom Tom Club)
- "Yesterday My Life (Un Oiseau Sur New York)" by Paul Anka
- "You Can Dance (If You Want To)" by Go Go Lorenzo and the Davis Pinckney Project
- "You Can't Live in Harlem", composed by Sammy Cahn and Saul Chaplin, performed by Sidney Bechet with Noble Sissle & his Orchestra
- "You Discover You're In New York" from The Gang's All Here
- "You Don't Mess Around with Jim" by Jim Croce
- "You've Gotta Believe (Let's Go Mets)" by Starchild
- "You Love To Hear The Stories" by Screwball
- "You May Be Right" by Billy Joel
- "You Might As Well Stay on Broadway" by music by Raymond Hubbell; lyrics by Harry B. Smith
- "You Never Seen A City Like (The Bronx)" by Pete Rock & Camp Lo
- "You Said Something" by PJ Harvey
- "You Surround Me" by Erasure
- "You Took the Sunshine from New York" by the Wildhearts
- "You Won't Succeed On Broadway" (from musical comedy 'Spamalot')
- "You'd Rather Run" by Jaymay
- "Your Broadway and My Broadway" from the musical film 'Broadway Melody of 1938'
- "Your Feet's Too Big" by Fats Waller
- "Your Latest Trick" by Dire Straits
- "You're Gonna Chase Love Away: Max's Kansas City" by Elliott Murphy
- "(You're My One and Only) True Love" by Seduction
- "Youth Of Eglington" by Black Uhuru
- "You've Gotta Believe (Let's Go Mets)" by Starchild
- "You've Seen Harlem at Its Best" by Ethel Waters
- "Yuletown Throw Down (Rapture)" by Blondie

== Z ==
- "Zanzibar" by Billy Joel
- "Zen Koans Gonna Rise Again" by Dave Van Ronk
- "Zephyr & I" by Suzanne Vega
- "Ziegfeld Girl" by Jerry Herman
- "Zing A Little Zong" by Bing Crosby and Jane Wyman
- "Zip Code" by Five Americans
- "The Zoo" by The Scorpions
- "Zoo York" by K Fanat
- "Zoo York" by Lil Tjay
- "Zoo York" by Oakenfold
- "Zulu Bronx River" by Afrika Bambaataa
