= New York Is Closed Tonight =

"New York Is Closed Tonight" is a song written in 1970 by Canadian musician Barry Greenfield, recording it as Greenfield in 1972.

The song became a hit in Canada during the summer of that year, reaching #34 on the charts, and spending three weeks in that position. It was a larger Adult Contemporary hit, spending two weeks at number one.
