= List of shipwrecks in 1993 =

The list of shipwrecks in 1993 includes all ships sunk, foundered, grounded, or otherwise lost during 1993.

table of contents
1993
Jan	Feb	Mar	Apr
May	Jun	Jul	Aug
Sep	Oct	Nov	Dec
Unknown date

== January ==
=== 5 January ===
List of shipwrecks: 5 January 1993
Ship	State	Description
Braer	Liberia	The tanker ran aground off the Shetland Islands and sank. All 34 crew were rescued by helicopter.

=== 14 January ===
List of shipwrecks: 14 January 1993
Ship	State	Description
Jan Heweliusz	Poland	The ferry sank in the Baltic Sea off Cape Arcona, Mecklenburg-Vorpommern, Germany with the loss of 56 of the 65 people on board.

=== 16 January ===
List of shipwrecks: 16 January 1993
Ship	State	Description
Massacre Bay	United States	The 86-foot (26.2 m) crab-fishing vessel ran aground and sank with the loss of three lives in Alitak Bay (56°50′N 154°10′W) on the southwest coast of Kodiak Island, Alaska, during a storm. There was one survivor.

=== 21 January ===
List of shipwrecks: 21 January 1993
Ship	State	Description
Maersk Navigator	Singapore	The tanker collided with Sanko Honour (Singapore) in the Strait of Malacca 60 nautical miles (110 km) off Sumatra, Indonesia. She caught fire and was abandoned by her 24 crew. who were rescued by DSR Atlantic (Germany). Sanko Honour also caught fire, but that fire was quickly extinguished.

== February ==
=== 7 February ===
List of shipwrecks: 7 February 1993
Ship	State	Description
Alaskan Pride	United States	The 461-gross ton, 111.5-foot (34.0 m) or 120-foot (36.6 m) crab-fishing vessel sank in the Bering Sea 90 nautical miles (170 km; 100 mi) northwest of Cape Sarichef (54°35′50″N 164°55′30″W) on Unimak Island in the Aleutian Islands. The fishing vessel Brittany (United States) rescued her crew of seven.

=== 18 February ===
List of shipwrecks: 18 February 1993
Ship	State	Description
Neptune	Haiti	The ferry sank in the Canal du Sun on a voyage from Port au Prince to Jérémie. There were 285 survivors of the 1,500 on board.

=== 25 February ===
List of shipwrecks: 25 February 1993
Ship	State	Description
Kačjak	Croatia	Croatian War of Independence: The ferry was hit and sunk by Serbian artillery at Maslenica. Towed to Punat, Krk island. Scrapped in 1994.
Supetar	Croatia	Croatian War of Independence: The ferry was hit and sunk by Serbian artillery at Maslenica. Scrapped at Sibenik in 1997.

=== 28 February ===
List of shipwrecks: 28 February 1993
Ship	State	Description
Freja Svea	Bahamas	The tanker ran aground at Redcar, Cleveland, United Kingdom. All 21 crew were rescued by a Royal Air Force Sea King helicopter and The Scout ( Royal National Lifeboat Institution).

== March ==
=== 8 March ===
List of shipwrecks: 8 March 1993
Ship	State	Description
Lady of Good Voyage	United States	The 86-foot (26.2 m) cod-fishing trawler disappeared with the loss of her entire crew of four in the Bering Sea northwest of Unimak Island in the Aleutian Islands.

=== 13 March ===
List of shipwrecks: 14 March 1993
Ship	State	Description
Fantastico	Honduras	1993 Storm of the Century: The freighter foundered in the Gulf of Mexico 70 miles (110 km) southwest of Fort Myers, Florida, United States. Seven of her crew died when a Coast Guard helicopter was forced back to base due to low fuel levels after rescuing three crew members.

=== 14 March ===
List of shipwrecks: 14 March 1993
Ship	State	Description
Gold Bond Conveyor	Liberia	1993 Storm of the Century: The cargo ship foundered in the Atlantic Ocean 60 nautical miles (110 km) off Cape Sable Island, Nova Scotia, Canada with the loss of all 33 crew. 1993 Storm of the Century

== April ==
=== 9 April ===
List of shipwrecks: 9 April 1993
Ship	State	Description
YCF-17 (or "The Salt Barge")	United States Navy	Loaded with discarded tires, the retired 150-foot (45.7 m) barge – a former car float – was scuttled as an artificial reef in the North Atlantic Ocean off Cape May, New Jersey, at 38°50.959′N 074°42.385′W.

=== 12 April ===
List of shipwrecks: 12 April 1993
Ship	State	Description
Phoenix	United States	After the fishing vessel became disabled when her rigging became entangled in her propeller, she drifted onto rocks and was wrecked off Umnak Island in the Aleutian Islands between Twin Lava Point and Derby Point.
Vishva Mohini	India	The cargo ship sank in the Bay of Biscay off the northern coast of Spain with the loss of 31 of the 47 people on board

=== 16 April ===
List of shipwrecks: 16 April 1993
Ship	State	Description
USS Rushmore	United States Navy	The decommissioned dock landing ship was sunk as a target.

== May ==
=== 13 May ===
List of shipwrecks: 13 May 1993
Ship	State	Description
Response	United States	The 130-foot (39.6 m) longline cod-fishing vessel burned and sank in the Gulf of Alaska off Cape Chiniak (57°37′N 152°10′W) on Kodiak Island near Kodiak, Alaska. Her entire crew of 14 survived.

== June ==
=== 3 June ===
List of shipwrecks: 3 June 1993
Ship	State	Description
British Trent	Bermuda	The tanker collided with Western Winner (Panama) and caught fire with the loss of nine of her 34 crew. The fire was extinguished but British Trent was declared a constructive total loss and consequently scrapped.

=== 5 June ===
List of shipwrecks: 5 June 1993
Ship	State	Description
USS Salmon	United States Navy	The decommissioned Sailfish-class submarine was sunk in the Atlantic Ocean off Long Island, New York, near Hudson Canyon for use as a bottom sonar target.

=== 10 June ===
List of shipwrecks: 10 June 1993
Ship	State	Description
Fenwick	United States	The 57-foot (17.4 m) longline halibut-fishing vessel sank approximately 40 nautical miles (74 km; 46 mi) south of Homer, Alaska. All seven people on board survived.

=== 11 June ===
List of shipwrecks: 11 June 1993
Ship	State	Description
HMS Charybdis	Royal Navy	The Leander-class frigate was sunk as a target.
Saratoga	United States	The 51-foot (15.5 m) longline halibut-fishing vessel sank near Yakutat, Alaska, after her load shifted, causing her to flood. Her crew of five survived.

=== 12 June ===
List of shipwrecks: 12 June 1993
Ship	State	Description
Gladys M	United States	The 33-foot (10.1 m) longline halibut-fishing vessel capsized and sank in Cook Inlet northeast of Augustine Island on the south-central coast of Alaska. Her crew of four survived.

=== 24 June ===
List of shipwrecks: 24 June 1993
Ship	State	Description
Flyin’ Lion	United States	The 30-foot (9.1 m) seiner capsized and sank in the Egegik River in Alaska due to an improperly connected towline. Her crew of three survived.

== July ==
=== 1 July ===
List of shipwrecks: 1 July 1993
Ship	State	Description
Demetra M	United States	The 34-foot (10.4 m) longline halibut-fishing vessel rolled over and sank while at anchor in Emerald Cove (60°57′15″N 147°02′00″W) in Columbia Bay (60.9816°N 147.0807°W) on the south-central coast of Alaska.

=== 2 July ===
List of shipwrecks: 2 July 1993
Ship	State	Description
Unnamed barge	Philippines	A barge carrying the Bocaue River Festival pagoda in the Bocaue River sank killing more than 200 people on board. (See Bocaue Pagoda tragedy)

=== 15 July ===
List of shipwrecks: 15 July 1993
Ship	State	Description
"Border Star"	United Kingdom	The 65-foot (20 m) fishing vessel flooded and sank while laid up at Holyhead. Raised and converted into a houseboat.

=== 19 July ===
List of shipwrecks: 19 July 1993
Ship	State	Description
Onondaga	United States	The retired 205-foot (62.5 m) barge was scuttled as an artificial reef in the North Atlantic Ocean off Cape May, New Jersey, in 65 feet (20 m) of water at 38°53.770′N 074°39.975′W.

=== 22 July ===
List of shipwrecks: 22 July 1993
Ship	State	Description
Frances Lee	United States	The 107-foot (32.6 m) crab-fishing vessel was stranded at Knoll Point (56°54′N 153°35′W) off Kodiak Island in Alaska′s Kodiak Archipelago. The fishing vessel Macanaw (United States) rescued her crew of six. She was refloated and taken under tow by the tug Ardie and fishing vessel Barb M (both United States), but capsized on 25 July between Knoll Point and Twoheaded Island (56.9003°N 153.5841°W). The cutter USCGC Mustang ( United States Coast Guard) then towed her out into 300 feet (91 m) of water and sank her with 112 rounds from her Mark 38 25-mm gun.

=== 27 July ===
List of shipwrecks: 27 July 1993
Ship	State	Description
Fast Lady	United States	The 46-foot (14.0 m) salmon seiner was destroyed by fire without loss of life at Chignik, Alaska.
West Wind	United States	The 152-foot (46.3 m) tender flooded and sank in Orca Bay off the coast of Alaska. All four people on board survived.

== August ==
=== 1 August ===
List of shipwrecks: 1 August 1993
Ship	State	Description
USS Inaugural	United States Navy	The museum ship, a decommissioned Admirable-class minesweeper, broke loose from her mooring in the Mississippi River at St. Louis, Missouri at the Gateway Arch during flooding. The ship suffered a breach in her hull, took on water, and rolled on her port side. She sank on the Missouri side of the river, one-half mile (0.80 km) south of the Poplar Street Bridge.

=== 3 August ===
List of shipwrecks: 3 August 1993
Ship	State	Description
Sunrise	United States	The 40-foot (12.2 m) salmon seiner burned to the waterline and sank off Hook Point (60°20′N 146°15′W) on the south-central coast of Alaska. The only person on board survived.

=== 5 August ===
List of shipwrecks: 5 August 1993
Ship	State	Description
Ronde Joyce II	United States	The retired 62-foot (18.9 m) tug was scuttled as an artificial reef in the North Atlantic Ocean 3.6 nautical miles (6.7 km; 4.1 mi) off Sea Girt, New Jersey, in 65 feet (20 m) of water at 40°06.486′N 073°57.224′W.

=== 7 August ===
List of shipwrecks: 7 August 1993
Ship	State	Description
Barconi	United States	The 44-foot (13.4 m) salmon seiner burned to the waterline and sank off Flat Island (59°19′45″N 151°59′45″W) near Seldovia, Alaska. Her crew of three survived.
Preston Brooks	United States	The 90-foot (27.4 m) fish tender sank in the Barren Islands (58°57′N 152°15′W) off the south-central coast of Alaska. Her captain died of hypothermia because of a tear in his survival suit, but her other two crew members survived.

=== 8 August ===
List of shipwrecks: 8 August 1993
Ship	State	Description
Nana Nicole	United States	The 30-foot (9.1 m) fishing vessel sank after striking a log at Cold Bay, Alaska.

=== 9 August ===
List of shipwrecks: 9 August 1993
Ship	State	Description
Carol Mae	United States	The 34-foot (10.4 m) salmon seiner was destroyed by fire at Haines, Alaska, without loss of life.

=== 16 August ===
List of shipwrecks: 16 August 1993
Ship	State	Description
Cecilia J. Brown	United States	The retired 81-foot (24.7 m) tug was scuttled as an artificial reef in the North Atlantic Ocean off Cape May, New Jersey, in 60 feet (18 m) of water at 38°52.950′N 074°40.200′W.

=== 30 August ===
List of shipwrecks: 30 August 1993
Ship	State	Description
Lily Marlene	United States	The 37-foot (11.3 m) fishing vessel was destroyed by fire in Chignik Bay (56°18′N 158°24′W) on the south coast of the Alaska Peninsula.

=== Unknown ===
List of shipwrecks: Unknown August 1993
Ship	State	Description
Unidentified Sri Lankan patrol boat	Sri Lanka Navy	Sri Lankan Civil War: The Super Dvora-class patrol boat was sunk by Liberation Tigers of Tamil Eelam forces on 18 or 29 August.

== September ==
=== 7 September ===
List of shipwrecks: 7 September 1993
Ship	State	Description
Lisa Denise	United States	The 31-foot (9.4 m) fishing vessel burned and sank at Naked Island (60°40′N 147°25′W) in Prince William Sound on the south-central coast of Alaska. Her crew of three survived.

=== 9 September ===
List of shipwrecks: 9 September 1993
Ship	State	Description
USCGC Cape Strait	United States Coast Guard	Lashed to the buoy tender Johnny Buoy, the decommissioned 95-foot (29 m) Cape-class cutter was scuttled as an artificial reef in the North Atlantic Ocean off Cape May, New Jersey, in 65 feet (20 m) of water at 38°51.060′N 074°42.125′W.
Johnny Buoy	United States Coast Guard	Lashed to the cutter USCGC Cape Strait, the decommissioned 46-foot (14 m) buoy tender was scuttled as an artificial reef in the North Atlantic Ocean off Cape May, New Jersey, in 65 feet (20 m) of water at 38°51.060′N 074°42.125′W.
Minotaur	United States	The 32-foot (9.8 m) longline fishing vessel sank near the entrance to Prince William Sound on the south-central coast of Alaska. The fishing vessel Dr. Jack (United States) rescued her two-person crew.

=== 11 September ===
List of shipwrecks: 11 September 1993
Ship	State	Description
Merrie Colleen	United States	The 58-foot (17.7 m) salmon seiner burned to the waterline and sank near Nichols Island (55°10′N 132°59′W) in Southeast Alaska. Her four-person crew abandoned ship in a 10-foot (3.0 m) skiff and was rescued by the 22-foot (6.7 m) research vessel Cape Henry (United States).

=== 17 September ===
List of shipwrecks: 17 September 1993
Ship	State	Description
Nettie H	United States	The 58-foot (17.7 m) crab-fishing vessel disappeared in the Bering Sea somewhere between False Pass, Alaska, and Saint Paul Island with the loss of her entire crew of one woman and four men. The woman′s body was found on 11 May 1994 in the Bering Sea inside a life raft she had been tied to.

=== 18 September ===
List of shipwrecks: 18 September 1993
Ship	State	Description
Arctic Dream	United States	The 50-foot (15.2 m) vessel was wrecked in Onion Bay (58°04′N 153°15′W) on the coast of Raspberry Island in Alaska′s Kodiak Archipelago.

=== 23 September ===
List of shipwrecks: 23 September 1993
Ship	State	Description
Krolik	United States	The 28-foot (8.5 m) fishing vessel sank in Humpy Cove in Resurrection Bay on the south-central coast of Alaska. The only person aboard survived.

== October ==
=== 10 October ===
List of shipwrecks: 10 October 1993
Ship	State	Description
Seohae	South Korea	The ferry sank in the Yellow Sea near Wido, Buan County, North Jeolla Province, South Korea, killing 292 of her 362 passengers and crew.

=== 20 October ===
List of shipwrecks: 20 October 1993
Ship	State	Description
OMI Charger	United States	The tanker suffered an onboard fire at Galveston, Texas following a welding operation. She exploded and sank. Three crew were killed and the ship was consequently declared a constructive total loss.

== November ==
=== 18 November ===
List of shipwrecks: 18 November 1993
Ship	State	Description
Borodinskoje Polye	Russia	The factory ship ran aground north of Lerwick, Shetland Islands. All 73 crew were rescued.

== December ==
=== 9 December ===
List of shipwrecks: 9 December 1993
Ship	State	Description
Grape One	Malta	The chemical tanker sank in the English Channel off Start Point, Devon, United Kingdom. All fifteen crew were rescued by a Royal Navy helicopter.

== Unknown date ==
List of shipwrecks: Unknown date 1993
Ship	State	Description
Ford Osprey	Portugal	The 108.6-foot (33.1 m), 230-ton trawler was wrecked near Caxinas beach, Vila do Conde, Portugal sometime in 1993.
Mr. J	United States	The crab processor – a former PCE-842-class patrol craft and auxiliary minelayer – was towed out into the Pacific Ocean and scuttled sometime in the 1990s.
Tern	United Kingdom	The cargo ship developed a list 11 nautical miles (20 km) off Eastbourne, East Sussex. Four crew were taken off by helicopter. She came ashore at Bexhill-on-Sea, East Sussex.
Volgo-Balt 38	Russia	On 2 December, the cargo ship was reported to have run aground in the Black Sea off the coast of Bulgaria north of Varna and subsequently to have broken in two. Her after half sank.
