= Matuszak =

Matuszak is a Polish surname, and may refer to:

- David Matuszak, author, teacher, and Westerner
- John Matuszak (1950–1989), American football defensive end and actor
- Marv Matuszak (1931–2004), American football linebacker
- Rafał Matuszak (born 1977), Coma (band) bass guitar player
- Walter Matuszak (1918–2001), American football quarterback and veterinarian
