= MS Stefan Batory =

MS Stefan Batory is a wrong, yet commonly applied, name for two ships of the Polish merchant marine:

- MS Batory, a pre-war ocean liner
- TSS Stefan Batory, a post-war replacement for the earlier
