= 95–2003 =

Studio album by Piotr Rogucki
- Released: June 11, 2012
- Genre: Rock, hard rock
- Label: Mystic Production

Piotr Rogucki chronology
| Loki – Wizja Dźwięku (2011) | 95–2003 (2012) | J.P. Śliwa (2015) |

95–2003 is the second solo album by Polish rock singer Piotr Rogucki, frontman of the band Coma. It was released on June 11, 2012 through Polish label Mystic Production. The album debuted at number 1 on the official Polish sales chart OLiS.

== Track listing ==
| No. | Title | Length |
|---|---|---|
| 1. | "Ulotność (Volatility)" | 4:54 |
| 2. | "Piosenka Pisana Nocą (A song written at night)" | 5:33 |
| 3. | "Drzewo (Tree)" | 3:15 |
| 4. | "A My (And us)" | 4:39 |
| 5. | "Legenda O Próżności (The Legend Of Vanity)" | 4:32 |
| 6. | "Anioły (Angels)" | 4:18 |
| 7. | "Chimery (Chimaeras)" | 3:16 |
| 8. | "Zosia (Sophie)" | 4:25 |
| 9. | "Wrony (Crows)" | 4:04 |
| 10. | "Kot (Cat)" | 4:14 |
| 11. | "Requiem Prowincjonalne (Provincial requiem)" | 3:45 |

== Charts ==
| Chart (2012) | Peak position |
|---|---|
| Polish Albums (ZPAV) | 1 |

== See also ==
- List of number-one albums of 2012 (Poland)
