= Sinking of the MS Jan Heweliusz =

1993 maritime disaster

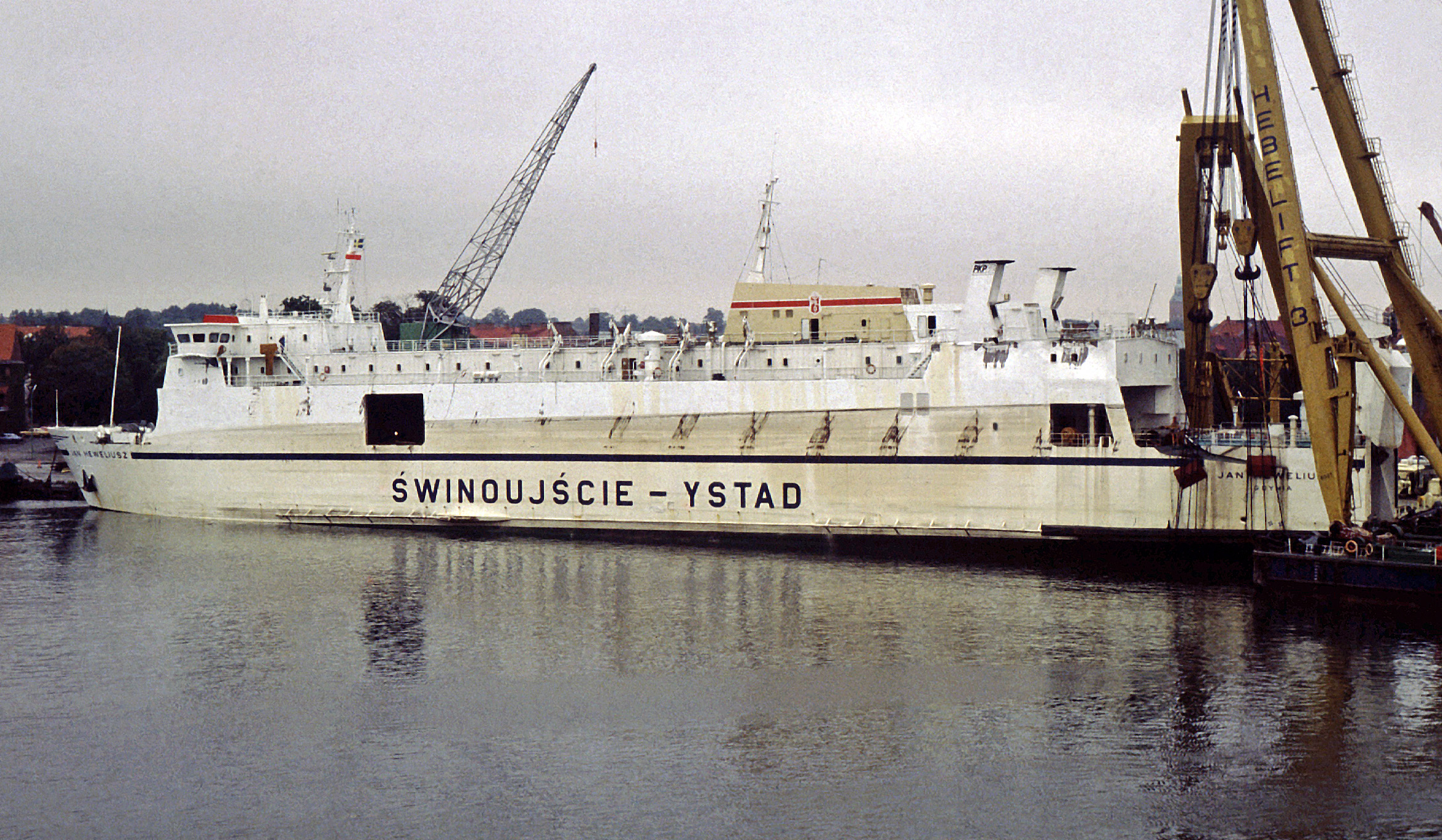
- MS Jan Heweliusz in 1982
- Date: 14 January 1993; 33 years ago
- Time: 04:10–05:12 (UTC+1)
- Duration: 1 hour and 2 minutes
- Location: Baltic Sea; 54°36′58″N 14°13′16″E
- Type: Maritime disaster
- Participants: 65; 9 survivors
- Deaths: 56

MS Jan Heweliusz sank on 14 January 1993, between about 04:10 and 05:12 (UTC+1) as the ship was crossing the Baltic Sea, en route from Świnoujście, Poland, to Ystad, Sweden. Out of 65 passengers and crew, 56 died in the disaster, making it the largest peacetime maritime disaster in Polish history.

== Background ==
MS Jan Heweliusz, a roll-on/roll-off ship, was launched in 1977. It was owned by Polish Ocean Lines and operated by Euroafrica. It operated between Świnoujście and Ystad, transporting trucks and rail cars. Over 15 years, the ship had nearly 30 serious accidents, including a near-sinking in 1982 and a major fire in 1986. After the fire, Polish Ocean Lines ordered repairs to the ship, which resulted in 70 tons of concrete being added to the affected deck, causing stability issues.

Four days before the disaster, the ship's stern gate was damaged while docking in Ystad. Because of this, Captain Andrzej Ułasiewicz sought to cancel the ship's departure and take it out of service for repairs. However, the shipowners ordered the crew to provisionally repair the stern gate and have it gradually repaired at a later time during lay-ups. Temporary repairs to the stern gate caused the ship's departure to be delayed by two hours.

== Sinking ==
The ship set sail at 22:30 (UTC+1) on the evening of 13 January 1993, two hours behind schedule. It was carrying 36 passengers, 29 crew members, 28 trucks, and 10 rail cars. All crew members were Polish. The forecast called for severe weather.

At around 02:40 on 14 January 1993, weather conditions began to deteriorate as a result of Storm Verena, which was sweeping across the Baltic Sea. The ship experienced winds measuring 12 on the Beaufort scale; wind speeds reached 160 km/h (86 kn; 99 mph) and waves reached a height of 5 m (16 ft). As the ship struggled with stability, the crew reduced its speed, which caused a loss in steering. Additionally, due to strong port side winds, the crew filled the port side ballast tanks, contrary to operational recommendations, in an attempt to increase stability.

At around 04:00, hurricane-force winds struck the side of the ship, causing it to list. Captain Ułasiewicz attempted to mitigate this by steering the ship's bow toward the direction of the wind, but to no avail. A sudden gust of wind struck the starboard side of the ship, causing a severe list to port, exacerbated by the port side ballast tanks being full. The fasteners that secured the ship's cargo then broke.

At 04:30, Captain Ułasiewicz ordered an evacuation of the ship. Many passengers were only wearing pajamas as they attempted to evacuate, and several were thrown overboard by gusts of wind. At 04:40, the ship sent out a "mayday" call. At 05:12, the ship capsized about 24 km (15 mi) off the coast of Cape Arkona on the German island of Rügen. Survivors stated that the ship capsized so quickly that it was difficult to launch the lifeboats in time.

First I heard [Captain Ułasiewicz] calling on Channel 16 VHF. He said that the ferry had a 30-degree list and was sounding an alarm to abandon ship. Rønne Radio was already on the radio. The shore station called Jan Heweliusz, asking for the vessel's position. The response was that the list to the side was approaching 70 degrees, and then there was silence. At that point, any communication with the ferry was cut off forever.

— Edward Bieniek, Captain of the MS Mikołaj Kopernik

== Rescue effort ==
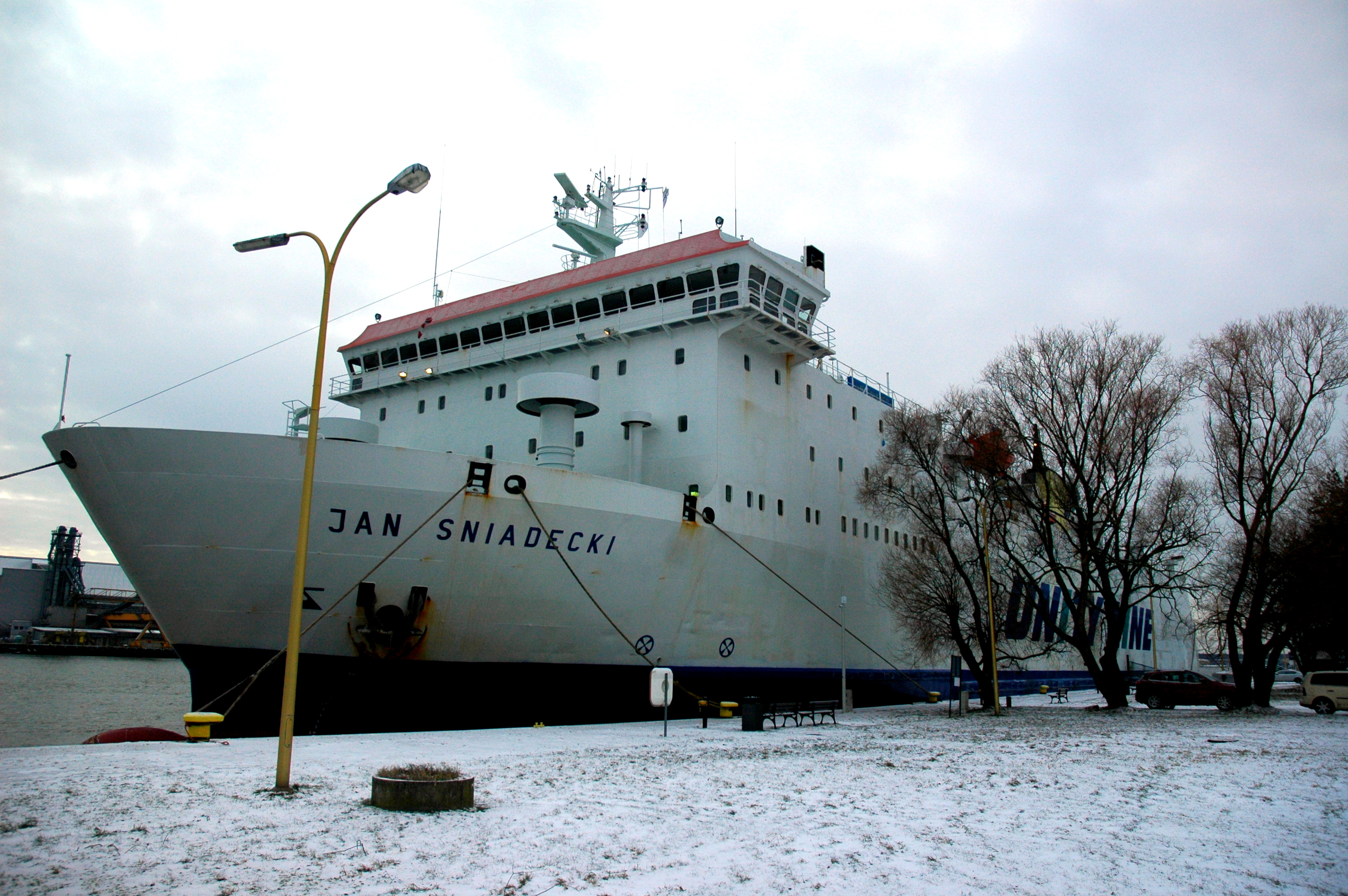
MS Jan Śniadecki was deployed in the rescue effort.

Rescue helicopters were deployed from Parow, near Stralsund, and from Denmark. MS Jan Śniadecki, which would eventually replace Jan Heweliusz on the Świnoujście-Ystad line, was also deployed in the rescue operations. Due to miscommunication about the ferry's location, the helicopters did not arrive until about an hour and a half after the sinking. The water temperature was 2 °C (36 °F), causing the few lifeboat occupants to suffer from hypothermia.

Only nine people survived, all crew members, who were flown to German hospitals to be treated for hypothermia.

== Investigation ==
Prime Minister Hanna Suchocka established a commission to investigate the disaster; however, the commission's inquiry was suspended in March 1993 without producing a report. After years of investigation, it was ruled that the shipowner who allowed Jan Heweliusz to operate, Euroafrica, was responsible for the disaster. The Polish Register of Shipping, the Szczecin Maritime Office, and Captain Andrzej Ułasiewicz were also found to have been partially liable.

== Victims ==
A total of 56 lives were lost in the disaster: 20 crew members and 36 passengers. The deceased passengers, most of whom were truck drivers, included Polish, Swedish, Austrian, Hungarian, Norwegian, Czech, and Yugoslav nationals. Also among the dead were two children. Only 37 bodies were ever recovered.

== Legacy ==
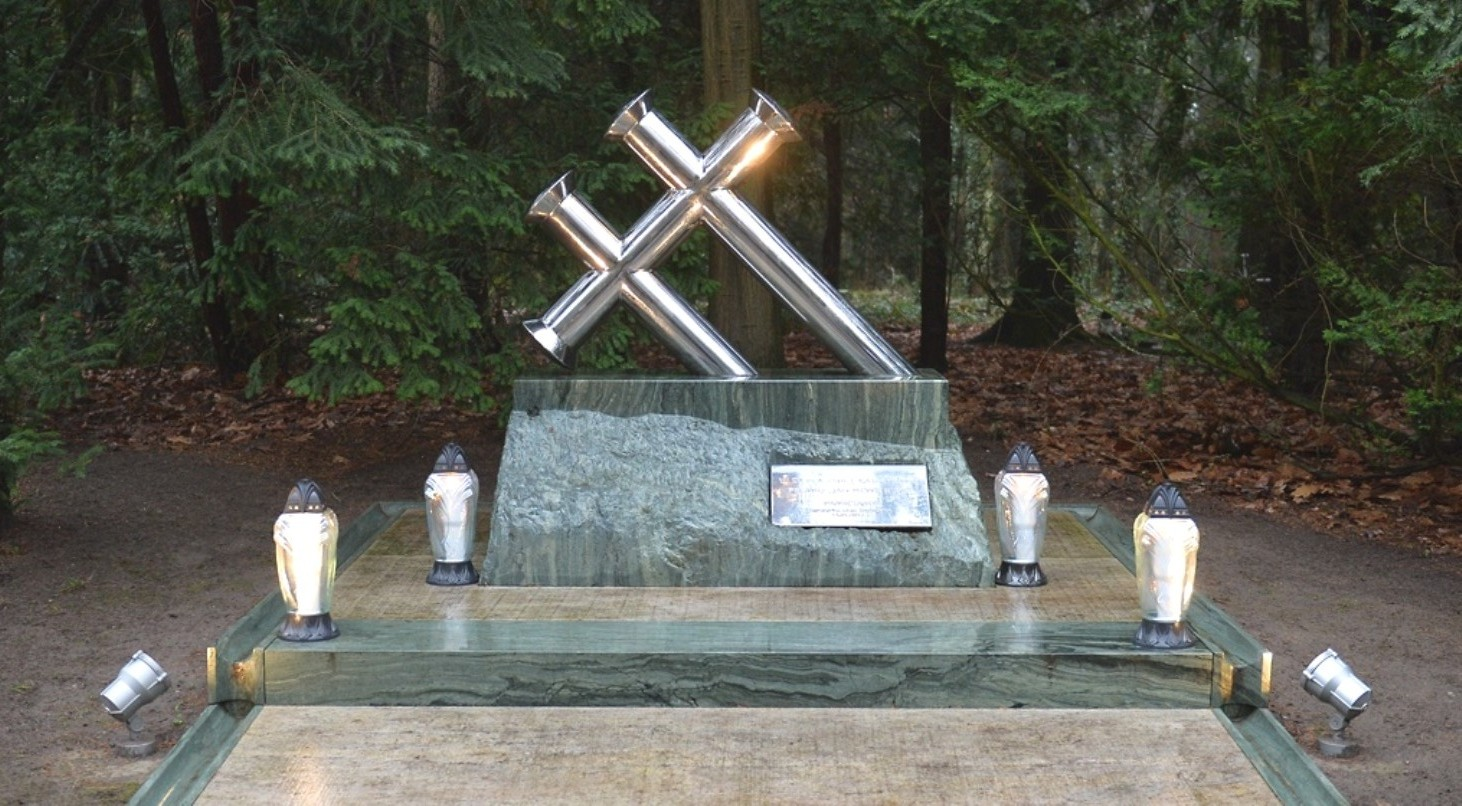
Memorial in Szczecin's Central Cemetery

A memorial to the victims was erected in Szczecin's Central Cemetery in 2013. There is also a memorial in Plac Rybaka in Świnoujście. Some items recovered from the tragedy are on display at the National Maritime Museum in Gdańsk. Due to its shallow maximum depth of 24 m (79 ft), Jan Heweliusz is a popular wreck diving destination.

=== In popular culture ===
The sinking of Jan Heweliusz was the subject of a 2025 Netflix miniseries, titled Heweliusz. The series was announced as "the largest and most complex Polish television series production in recent years," featuring over 120 named characters and 3,000 extras, and requiring a crew of over 140 members.

== See also ==
- List of shipwrecks in 1993
