= Heweliusz =

2025 Polish television miniseries

- Polish Netflix poster
- Written by: Kasper Bajon
- Directed by: Jan Holoubek
- Starring: Magdalena Różczka; Michał Żurawski; Konrad Eleryk; Justyna Wasilewska; Borys Szyc
- Composer: Jan Komar
- Country of origin: Poland
- Original language: Polish
- No. of episodes: 5

Production
- Executive producer: Anna Kępińska
- Producer: Anna Kępińska
- Cinematography: Bartłomiej Kaczmarek
- Editor: Rafał Listopad
- Running time: 49–81 minutes
- Production company: Telemark

Original release
- Network: Netflix
- Release: 5 November 2025

Heweliusz is a Polish historical drama television miniseries about the sinking of the MS Jan Heweliusz. Featuring an ensemble cast, it stars Magdalena Różczka, Michał Żurawski, Konrad Eleryk, Justyna Wasilewska, and Borys Szyc. It was released on Netflix on 5 November 2025.

== Premise ==
In 1993, the Polish ferry MS Jan Heweliusz capsizes off the coast of Rügen in the Baltic Sea.

== Cast ==
- Magdalena Różczka as Jolanta Ułasiewicz
- Michał Żurawski as Piotr Binter
- Konrad Eleryk as Witold "Witek" Skirmuntt
- Justyna Wasilewska as Aneta Kaczkowska
- Borys Szyc as Captain Ułasiewicz
- Jan Englert as Binter's father
- Magdalena Zawadzka as Binter's mother
- Jacek Koman as Ignacy Budzisz
- Mirosław Zbrojewicz as Mirosław Kurzak
- Andrzej Konopka as Henryk Kubara
- Tomasz Schuchardt as Marek Kaczkowski
- Łukasz Lewandowski as Waldemar "Waldek" Skrzypczyński
- Dariusz Chojnacki as Krzysztof Reniek
- Jacek Beler as Michalczuk
- Michał Pawlik as Zawadzki
- Mia Goti as Agnieszka Ułasiewicz
- Marcin Januszkiewicz as Artur Ferenc
- Mateusz Górski as Zajdel
- Piotr Łukaszczyk as Korzyński
- Anna Dereszowska as Zylbern
- Michalina Łabacz as Jadwiga Skirmuntt
- Mirosław Kropielnicki as Wiesław Kosiorek
- Magdalena Osińska as Stewardess Ola
- Dominika Kluźniak as Zaborek
- Julian Świeżewski as the military courier
- Joachim Lamża as Janusz Kowalik
- Piotr Rogucki as Marek Celej
- Sylwia Gola as Irena
- Katharina Nesytowa as Veronika Neumann
- Bartłomiej Kotschedoff as the military courier

== Episodes ==
| No. | Title | Duration | Original release date |
|---|---|---|---|
| 1 | "Episode 1" | 49 min | 5 November 2025 |
| 2 | "Episode 2" | 60 min | 5 November 2025 |
| 3 | "Episode 3" | 61 min | 5 November 2025 |
| 4 | "Episode 4" | 58 min | 5 November 2025 |
| 5 | "Episode 5" | 81 min | 5 November 2025 |

== Production ==
Heweliusz was announced as "the largest and most complex Polish television series production in recent years," featuring over 120 named characters and 3,000 extras, and requiring a crew of over 140 members. Principal photography took place from January to August 2024. The series was shot in Świnoujście, Szczecin, Stargard, Zgorzelec, Gdynia, Sopot, Nowy Port, Wrocław, Warsaw, and Chałupki. Additionally, water stunt scenes were filmed in a studio in Brussels.

== Release ==
In March 2024, Netflix presented clips from the series at Series Mania. Later that year, it was also previewed at the New Horizons Film Festival. A teaser trailer was released on 16 June 2025, while the official trailer was released on 10 September 2025. Ahead of the series' release, the first two episodes were screened at the Szczecin Philharmonic and the Gdynia Film Center. The series was released on Netflix on 5 November 2025.

== Accolades ==
| Award | Year | Category | Result | Ref. |
|---|---|---|---|---|
| Polish Film Awards | 2026 | Best TV Series | Won | |
