= Polish Ocean Lines =

Polish shipping company

Polish Ocean Lines P.L.O
- Native name: Polskie Linie Oceaniczne
- Company type: Joint stock company
- Industry: Ship transport
- Predecessor: Gdynia-Ameryka Linie Żeglugowe SA, Żegluga Polska, Polsko-Brytyjskie Towarzystwo Okrętowe
- Founded: 2 January 1951; 72 years ago
- Headquarters: Gdynia, Poland
- Website: Polskie Linie Oceaniczne SA

Polish Ocean Lines (PLO, Polish: Polskie Linie Oceaniczne) is a Polish commercial shipping company, with headquarters in Gdynia. The company was created in 1951 in a merger of three smaller shipping companies. Currently, PLO acts as a holding company for 12 other shipping companies.

== History ==
House flag of Polish Ocean Lines

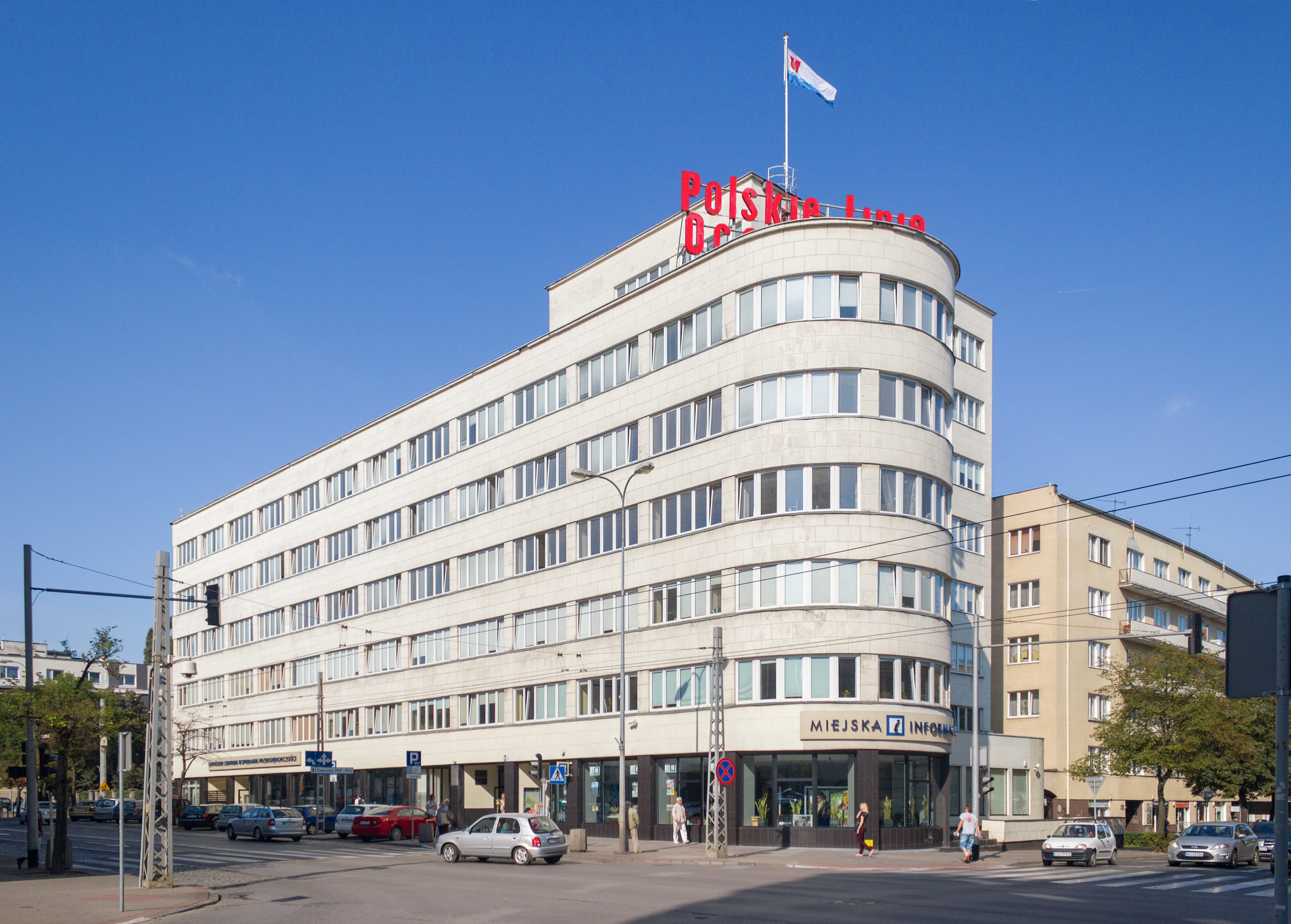
Former PLO Building in Śródmieście, Gdynia

PLO was founded as a state owned company in 1951, with the merger of: Gdynia-Ameryka Linie Żeglugowe S.A. (Gdynia-America Line – GAL), Żegluga Polska (Shipping Polish) and Polsko-Brytyjskie Towarzystwo Okrętowe (Polish-British Shipping Partnership). After the creation of the company there was gradual development including buying more equipment and increased employment. From 1951 to 1954, the company was also a part owner the Sopot Grand Hotel. Tonnage of vessels increased in the 60s to reach the level of 800,000 DWT. In 1967, due to the blockade of the Suez Canal, PLO ships, performing cruises to the Far East, were forced to circumnavigate Africa. In 1969, the company's flagship ceased to be MS Batory, which was scrapped in 1971 with its place taken by the more modern TSS Stefan Batory.

In the 1970s tonnage increased further, and at the end of the decade was about 1,200,000 DWT with 176 ships bearing the mark Armatorski PLO. About 10,000 people were employed, of which nearly 80% were crew at sea. Freight reached 5 million tons. During that time ships engaged in freight shipping were moved to another state owned company, PŻM. This made it possible to consolidate the shipping sector in Poland. The transport of shipping containers was also started at this time. The introduction of martial law in Poland in 1981 reduced turnover, which began to cause losses. The process restricted operations. Older ships were scrapped and some newer ones sold. By the end of the 80s the fleet had shrunk to 97 ships.

Systemic changes in Poland following the fall of communism in 1989 necessitated profound changes in the PLO, which had to be restructured. Savings were identified, activity reduced, and employment cut. On 29 June 1999 the state company was transformed into a joint stock company. By this stage, companies within the group employed only about three thousand people. Currently, there are attempts to increase PLO's participation in global maritime transport.

== Activities ==
Currently the PLO group has 12 subsidiary companies, two of which are in liquidation. The most important is the company POL-Levant (POL-Levant Linie Żeglugowe Spółka z o.o.), whose main task is to provide profile strict shipping. It deals with, among others, maintaining the scheduled tonnage for conventional and RORO vessels in the Baltic, the North Sea and the Mediterranean.

Other PLO companies duties include the organization of supply vessels and the recruitment of crews.

== Notable ships ==
List of selected ships operated by Polish Ocean Lines
| Name | In PLO Service | Fate | Original owner |
|---|---|---|---|
| MS Warta / Prezydent Gottwald | 1951 - 1954 | First Polish post-war cargo ship since 6 May 1949; renamed on 19 March 1953; illegally bombarded and seized by Republic of China Navy of the Kuomintang regime in West Pacific Ocean, 12 May 1954 | Gdynia America Line |
| MS Batory | 1951 - 1971 | Became a temporary hotel ship in Gdynia, 1969. After 1970 sold for scrap to Hong Kong. | Gdynia-America Line |
| TSS Stefan Batory | 1969 - 1988 | Sold to Sweden. Scrapped in Turkey, 2000. | Holland America Line |
| MS Stalowa Wola | 1951 - 1956 | Sunk, 19 March 1956. | Gdynia-America Line |
| MS Morska Wola | 1951 - 1959 | Scrapped, 1959. | Gdynia-America Line |
| SS Narwik | 1951 - 1972 | Scrapped, 1970s | Gdynia-America Line |
| SS Tobruk | 1951 - 1968 | Scrapped, 1968 | Ministry of War Transport |
| SS Jedność | 1951 - 1963 | Scrapped, 1960s | Ministry of War Transport |
| MS Jan Heweliusz | 1977 - 1993 (Ownership only) | Sunk, 13 January 1993 | Polish Ocean Lines |
| MS Józef Conrad | 1961 - 1974 | Sunk after being bombed in Haiphong (Vietnam War), 1974 | Polish Ocean Lines |
| MS Kliński | 1951 - 1972 | Scrapped in Hong Kong, 1973 | Gdynia-America Line |
