= Loki – Wizja Dźwięku =

Studio album by Piotr Rogucki
- Released: March 21, 2011
- Genre: Rock
- Label: Mystic Production
- Producer: Marian Wróblewski

Piotr Rogucki chronology
Loki – Wizja Dźwięku (2011)	95–2003 (2012)

Loki – Wizja Dźwięku is the debut solo album by Polish rock singer Piotr Rogucki, frontman of the band Coma. It was released on March 21, 2011 through Polish label Mystic Production. The album peaked at number 2 on the official Polish sales chart OLiS.

== Background and composition ==
Piotr Rogucki has begun his career performing solo with a guitar, and formed Coma several years later. He has said that he was always planning to release a solo album, to have an outlet for different kind of expression than the one presented while playing with Coma. Loki – Wizja Dźwięku was, according to Rogucki, a "soundtrack to a film that was never created." The concept album tells a story of Loki – an eccentric rock musician and troublemaker, loved by companions and women – from the moment he decides to end his musical career, and follows him through various stages of life, from erotic experiences to falls and tragedies.

== Promotion ==
The album was promoted by the lead single "Szatany". A music video for the song was shot by Mateusz Winkiel in an Evangelical Church of the Augsburg Confession in Łódź. Music videos were also released for "Wizja Dźwięku", and live performances of "Piegi w Locie" and "Mała".

== Critical reception ==
Professional ratings
Review scores
Source	Rating
ArtRock.pl	8/10 stars
Gitarzysta	7/10
Onet.pl	3/5 stars
Rock Area	7.5/10
Rock Magazyn	4/5 stars
Teraz Rock	4/5 stars

Loki – Wizja Dźwięku has received positive reviews from music critics.

== Track listing ==
All tracks are written by Piotr Rogucki, except where noted.

No.	Title	Length
1.	"Wizja Dźwięku (A vision of sound)"	3:24
2.	"Nie Bielsko (Not Bielsko)"	4:27
3.	"Argonauci (Argonauts)"	3:50
4.	"Sopot"	4:22
5.	"Plaster Miodu 1 (Honeycomb)"	2:28
6.	"Szatany (Devils)"	4:22
7.	"Witaminki (Vitamins)"	4:03
8.	"Wielkie K (Capital K)"	4:02
9.	"Mała (Little one)"	3:06
10.	"Plaster Miodu 2 (Honeycomb 2)"	2:24
11.	"Piegi w Locie (Freckles in flight)"	5:01
12.	"Szwajcarski Nóż (Swiss army knife)"	4:35
13.	"Plaster Miodu 3 (Honeycomb 3)" (lyrics by Rafał Wojaczek)	1:43
14.	"Ruda Wstążka (Ginger ribbon)"	4:29
15.	"I'm Not Afraid of Your Soul"	3:16

== Personnel ==
- Piotr Rogucki – lead and background vocals
- Marian Wróblewski – production, arrangement, guitar, bass guitar, keyboards, background vocals, harmonica, harmonium, tambourine, trombone, banjo
- Maciej Cieślak – drums, percussion
- Tomasz "Zed" Zalewski – vocals, background vocals, mixing, mastering
- Kuba Galiński – keyboards, harmonium, arrangement
- Wojtek Traczyk – bass guitar, arrangement
- Marcin Ułanowski – drums, percussion, tambourine, arrangement
- Paweł Tomaszewski – recitation, dialogues

== Charts ==
Chart (2012)	Peak position
Polish Albums (ZPAV)	2
