= J.P. Śliwa =

Studio album by Piotr Rogucki
- Released: October 16, 2015
- Genre: Rock
- Label: Agora

Piotr Rogucki chronology
95–2003 (2012)	J.P. Śliwa (2015)

J.P. Śliwa – third solo album by Polish rock singer Piotr Rogucki, frontman of the band Coma. It was released on October 16, 2015 through Polish label Agora. The album debuted at number 8 on the official Polish sales chart OLiS.

== Track listing ==
No.	Title	Length
1.	"Vision of Sound"	2:05
2.	"Dobrze (Well)"	5:57
3.	"Mama 01 (Mom 01)"	3:02
4.	"Emotions"	4:33
5.	"Całuj się! (Go kiss yourself)"	3:19
6.	"Wanna (Bathtub)"	4:07
7.	"Ludzkie wrony (Human crows)"	5:09
8.	"Mama 02 (Mom 02)"	3:01
9.	"Muszę mieć (I need to have)"	5:32
10.	"Płyń (Swim)"	2:48

== Charts ==
Chart (2015)	Peak position
Polish Albums (ZPAV)	8
