= List of number-one albums of 2012 (Poland) =

These are the Polish number one albums of 2012, per the OLiS Chart.

== Chart history ==
Issue Date	Album	Artist(s)	Reference(s)
January 2	21	Adele	
January 9	Bar la Curva / Plamy na słońcu	Kazik Na Żywo	
January 16	Bar la Curva / Plamy na słońcu	Kazik Na Żywo	
January 23	21	Adele	
January 30	21	Adele	
February 6	To co dobre	Andrzej Piaseczny	
February 13	Old Ideas	Leonard Cohen	
February 20	Making Mirrors	Gotye	
February 27	Making Mirrors	Gotye	
March 5	Making Mirrors	Gotye	
March 12	21	Adele	
March 19	Secret Symphony	Katie Melua	
March 26	This Is Chris Botti	Chris Botti	
April 2	Myśliwiecka	Artur Andrus	
April 10	MDNA	Madonna	
April 16	Ostatnia szansa tego rapu	Tabasko	
April 23	Ostatnia szansa tego rapu	Tabasko	
April 30	Myśliwiecka	Artur Andrus	
May 14	Myśliwiecka	Artur Andrus	
May 21	Robaki	Luxtorpeda	
May 28	Myśliwiecka	Artur Andrus	
June 4	Myśliwiecka	Artur Andrus	
June 11	Gruby brzuch	GrubSon	
June 18	Myśliwiecka	Artur Andrus	
June 25	95–2003	Piotr Rogucki	
July 2	Jeden z was	Chada	
July 9	Living Things	Linkin Park	
July 16	Greatest Hits	Guns N' Roses	
July 23	Zaz	Zaz	
July 30	Myśliwiecka	Artur Andrus	
August 6	Myśliwiecka	Artur Andrus	
August 13	Myśliwiecka	Artur Andrus	
August 20	Myśliwiecka	Artur Andrus	
August 27	Anastasis	Dead Can Dance	
September 3	Myśliwiecka	Artur Andrus	
September 10	Myśliwiecka	Artur Andrus	
September 17	ciepło / zimno	happysad	
September 24	CNO2	Slums Attack	
October 1	CNO2	Slums Attack	
October 8	Greatest Hits	Queen	
October 15	Jezus Maria Peszek	Maria Peszek	
October 22	Jezus Maria Peszek	Maria Peszek	
October 29	Jezus Maria Peszek	Maria Peszek	
November 5	Jezus Maria Peszek	Maria Peszek	
November 12	MTV Unplugged	Hey	
November 19	Równonoc. Słowiańska dusza	Donatan	
November 26	Równonoc. Słowiańska dusza	Donatan	
December 3	Celebration Day	Led Zeppelin	
December 10	Jestem...	Bednarek	
December 17	Jestem...	Bednarek	
December 24	Zimowe piosenki	Andrzej Piaseczny and Seweryn Krajewski	
