= Zaprzepaszczone siły wielkiej armii świętych znaków =

Studio album by Coma
- Released: May 29, 2006
- Length: 73:01

Coma chronology
Pierwsze wyjście z mroku (2004)	Zaprzepaszczone siły wielkiej armii świętych znaków (2006)	Hipertrofia (2008)

Zaprzepaszczone siły wielkiej armii świętych znaków (English: The Wasted Forces Of Great Army Of Holy Signs) is the second studio album by Coma, released on May 29, 2006.

== About the album ==
In 2005 during a break in the tour, the band started to work on some new material, which was later tried out live. This is how "Zaprzepaszczone Siły Wielkiej Armii Świętych Znaków", Coma's second album began to take on its shape. It was released on 29 May 2006 and remained on the first place of the Official Retail Sales Chart for a few weeks and had soon gained the Golden Record status. And as was the case with the first record, also that time fans appreciated the album awarding it with the title of Antyradio's Album of the Year. The circle of Polish musicians, music journalists and music critics once again honoured Coma with Fryderyk awards. That time the band won two of them for Album of the Year Rock/metal and Group of the Year.

== Track listing ==
No.	Title	Length
1.	"Intro"	2:03
2.	"Zaprzepaszczone siły wielkiej armii świętych znaków [The Wasted Forces of Great Army of Holy Seals]"	14:13
3.	"Święta [Holy Feast (lit. Holiday)]"	4:58
4.	"Wojna [War]"	5:13
5.	"W ogrodzie [In the Garden]"	4:49
6.	"System"	3:54
7.	"Listopad [November]"	9:46
8.	"Nie ma Joozka [There's no Joozek]"	3:27
9.	"Tonacja (sygnał z piekła) [Tonality (Signal From Hell)]"	3:51
10.	"Ostrość na nieskończoność [Focus on Infinity]"	5:44
11.	"Daleka droga do domu [Long Way Home]"	4:11
12.	"Schizofrenia [Schizophrenia]"	7:38
13.	"Daleka droga do domu (radio edit) [Long Way Home (radio edit)]"	3:15
Total length:		73:01

== Personnel ==
- Piotr Rogucki – vocals, lyrics
- Marcin Kobza – guitar
- Rafał Matuszak – bass guitar
- Tomasz Stasiak – harpsichord
- Dominik Witczak – guitar
- Adam Marszałkowski – drums

== Charts ==
Chart (2006)	Peak position
Polish Albums (ZPAV)	1
