= Hipertrofia =

Studio album by Coma
- Released: November 10, 2008
- Recorded: August – September 2008
- Genre: Rock, art rock
- Length: 1:47:00
- Label: Sony BMG

Coma chronology
Zaprzepaszczone siły wielkiej armii świętych znaków (2006)	Hipertrofia (2008)	Excess (2010)

Professional ratings
Review scores
Source	Rating
Teraz Rock	4.5/5 stars

Hipertrofia (English: Hypertrophy) is the third studio album by Coma, released on November 10, 2008. The album consists of two compact discs with 35 songs. Hypertrophy is a concept album where all songs are connected with a single leading thought. This album was the best rock album in 2008 according to Antyradio

== Track listing ==
=== CD 1 ===
No.	Title	Length
1.	"Party - Ein Buch fur Alle und Keinen [A Book for All and None]"	3:51
2.	"Wola Istnienia...[Will of Existence...]"	5:47
3.	"After Party"	0:35
4.	"Lśnienie [Gleam]"	4:34
5.	"Diagnoza [Diagnosis]"	1:35
6.	"Transfuzja [Transfusion]"	3:40
7.	"Przesilenie [Crisis]"	1:04
8.	"Nadmiar [Overabundance]"	3:09
9.	"Nowe tereny migreny [New areas of migraine]"	1:15
10.	"Trujące rośliny [Poisonous plants]"	5:49
11.	"Ciągi i pociągi [Strings and trains]"	1:52
12.	"Osobowy [Local train]"	2:07
13.	"Loty i odloty [Flights and departures]"	1:41
14.	"Emigracja [Emigration]"	4:26
15.	"Stosunek do służby wojskowej [Relationship to military service]"	0:34
16.	"Zero osiem wojna [Zero eight war]"	4:58
17.	"Polish ham"	1:11
18.	"Pożegnanie z mistrzami [Farewell to the Masters]"	3:56
19.	"Chrum! [Oink!]"	0:04
20.	"Świadkowie schyłku czasów królewstwa wiecznych chłopców [Witnesses to the end of times of the kingdom of eternal boys]"	5:05
21.	"Koniec pewnego etapu [The end of a certain stage]"	0:28

=== CD 2 ===
No.	Title	Length
1.	"Początek pewnego etapu [Beginning of a certain stage]"	0:53
2.	"Ekhart [Eckhart]"	10:39
3.	"Na na na na"	0:48
4.	"Zamęt [Muddle]"	3:15
5.	"Zwalniamy [Slowing down]"	1:05
6.	"Widokówka [Postcard]"	6:50
7.	"Przestrzeń nie-rzeczywista [Un-real Space]"	1:02
8.	"Parapet [Windowsill]"	3:30
9.	"Popołudnia bezkarnie cytrynowe [Unpunishedly lemony afternoons]"	5:39
10.	"Ślimak [Snail]"	0:15
11.	"Cisza i ogień [Silence and fire]"	9:12
12.	"Epilog ze starym prykiem [Epilogue to the old fart]"	1:33
13.	"Archipelagi [Archipelagos]"	4:55
14.	"Recykling [Recycling]"	1:46
Total length:		1:47:00

== Personnel ==
- Rafał Matuszak - (Bass guitar)
- Dominik Witczak - (Guitar)
- Marcin Kobza - (Guitar)
- Adam Marszałkowski - (Drums)
- Piotr Rogucki - (Vocal)

== Charts ==
Chart (2008)	Peak position
Polish Albums (ZPAV)	1
