= Excess (album) =

Studio album by Coma
- Released: October 11, 2010
- Recorded: April – July 2010
- Genre: rock, art rock
- Length: 1:12:39
- Label: Mystic Production

Coma chronology
Hipertrofia (2008)	Excess (2010)	Symfonicznie (2010)

Excess is Coma's first English-language album, which was released in Europe on 11 October 2010. The album consists of nine tracks from Hipertrofia (2008), which were re-recorded in English, and three new songs: "F.T.P." and "F.T.M.O." from the movie Skrzydlate Świnie (where Rogucki played one of the main roles), and "Turn Back The River". On 1 September 2010, the album was made available to buy in Poland, but only via Mystic Production website.

== Track listing ==
No.	Title	Length
1.	"Excess"	6:00
2.	"Transfusion"	3:53
3.	"Poisonous Plants"	6:42
4.	"Confusion"	3:21
5.	"T.B.T.R."	8:29
6.	"Struggle"	5:02
7.	"Afternoons in the Colour of Yellow"	5:45
8.	"Witnesses of the Decline of the Eternal Boys Land"	5:11
9.	"Silence and Fire"	9:23
10.	"Eckhart"	10:46
11.	"F.T.P."	2:57
12.	"F.T.M.O."	5:16
Total length:		1:12:39

== Personnel ==
Coma

- Piotr Rogucki - vocals
- Dominik matuszak- guitar
- Marcin Kobza - guitar
- Rafał Matuszak - bass guitar
- Adam Marszałkowski - drums

== Charts ==
Chart (2006)	Peak position
Polish Albums (ZPAV)	12
