= MS Batory =

Polish ocean liner

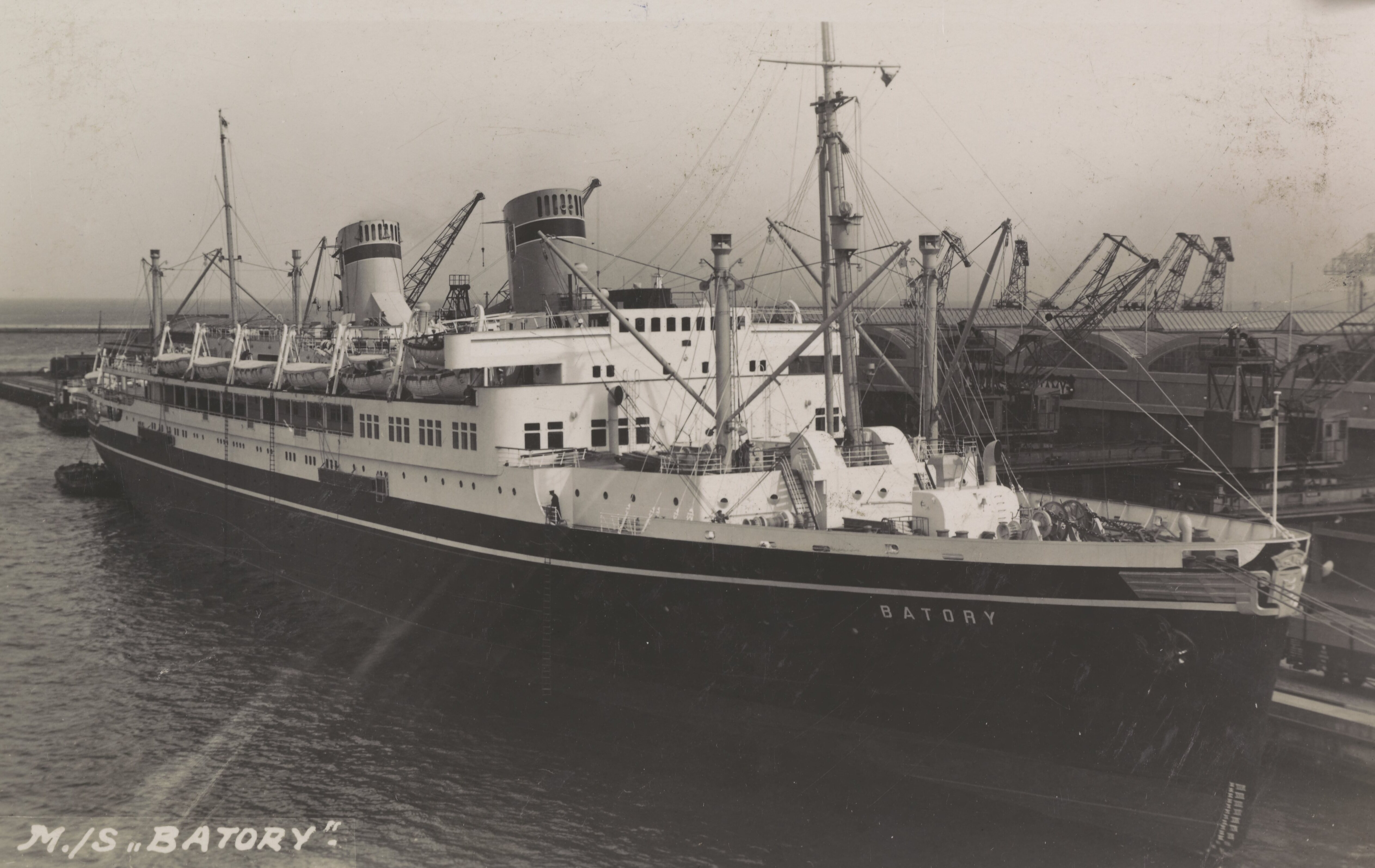
- MS Batory ca 1937-1939

History

Poland
- Name: Batory
- Namesake: King Stefan Batory
- Owner: Gdynia-America Line (1936–45); Ministry of War Transport (1945–46); Gdynia-America Line (1946–51); Polish Ocean Lines (1951–71)
- Operator: Gdynia-America Line (1936–45); Lamport and Holt (1945–46); Gdynia-America Line (1946–51); Polish Ocean Lines (1951–71)
- Port of registry: Gdynia
- Ordered: 29 November 1933
- Builder: Cantieri Riuniti dell'Adriatico, Monfalcone
- Yard number: 1127
- Laid down: 1 May 1934
- Launched: 3 July 1935
- Acquired: 23 April 1936
- Maiden voyage: 18 May 1936
- In service: 1936
- Out of service: 1 July 1969
- Identification: call sign SPEE (1936–45); call sign GJNV (1945–46); UK official number 180583 (1945–46); IMO number: 5038088
- Nickname(s): Lucky Ship
- Fate: Became a hotel ship in Gdynia, 1969. Sold back to Polish Ocean Lines in 1970, scrapped between 1971 and 1972 in Hong Kong.

General characteristics
- Type: Ocean liner
- Tonnage: 14,287 GRT; 8,167 NRT
- Length: 160.4 m (526.25 ft)
- Beam: 21.6 m (70.87 ft)
- Draught: 7.5 m (24.6 ft)
- Decks: 4 + 3 in superstructure
- Installed power: two Sulzer 2SSA 9-cylinder diesel engines, 12 680 hp (12 500 hp from April 1947)
- Propulsion: 2 propellers
- Speed: 18 knots (33 km/h); 20 knots (37 km/h) (until 1947)
- Capacity: to March 1940: 760; from March 1940: 1650 troops; from February 1941: 2200 troops; from April 1947: 832; from May 1957: 816; from June 1969: 600
- Crew: to December 1939: 313; from April 1947: 343

MS Batory was a Polish ocean liner which was the flagship of Gdynia-America Line, named after Stefan Batory, the sixteenth-century King of Poland. She was the sister ship of MS Piłsudski. After Allied wartime service, mainly under the UK Admiralty, she became in 1951 the flagship of the Polish Ocean Lines and the Polish merchant fleet. She is often described as the "Pride of the Polish Merchant Marine". Batory along with her sister Piłsudski were the two most popular ocean liners of Poland.

== History ==
=== Construction ===
Gdynia America Line (Gdynia–Ameryka Linie Żeglugowe, GAL), a Polish-Danish partnership based in Gdynia, was formed in 1934 as successor to Polskie Transatlantyckie Towarzystwo Okrętowe (PTTO), an enterprise originally dedicated to transporting Polish migrants to the USA. It changed its focus to leisure travel and for that purpose decided to commission a new vessel. Batory was built in 1934–5 at the Cantieri Riuniti dell'Adriatico Monfalcone shipyard in Trieste, Italy, under an arrangement where part of the commission was paid in shipments of coal from Poland.

She was among the best-known Polish ships of all time. She was launched on 3 July 1935. She was powered by two Sulzer diesel engines driving two screws giving a speed of 18 knots (33 km/h). She began regular service in May 1936 on the Gdynia — New York run, and by 1939 had carried over 3,000 passengers.

=== World War II ===
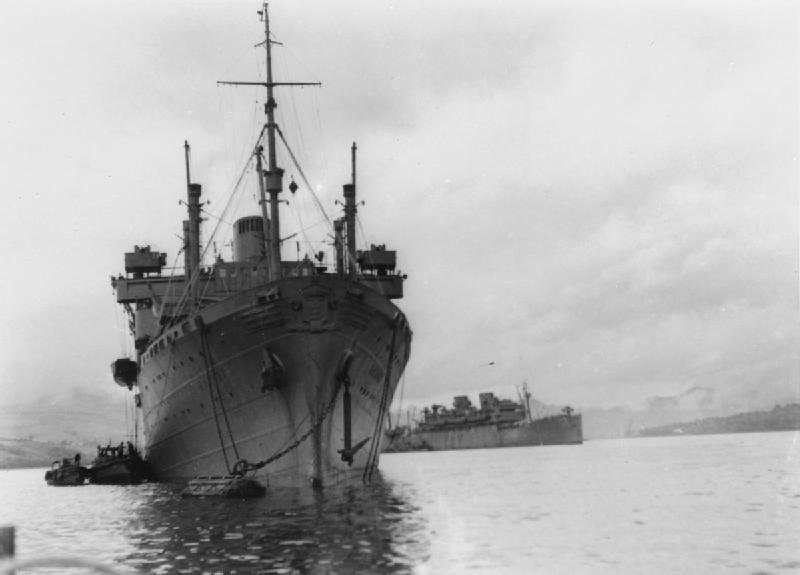
Batory in WWII

Mobilized at the outbreak of World War II, she served as a troop ship and a hospital ship by the Allied Navy for the rest of the war. In 1940 she, along with Chrobry, transported Allied troops during the Norwegian campaign. She was also one of the last ships to leave St Jean de Luz during the final evacuation of Polish troops from France. She was also used for secretly shipping many valuable Polish treasures to Canada for safekeeping. She participated in the evacuation of Dunkirk late May early June, taking aboard 2,500 people. Later she carried as many as 6,000 people in one evacuation. In June to July, she secretly transported much of the UK's gold reserves (£40 million) from Greenock, Scotland, to Montreal, Canada, for safekeeping (Operation Fish). On 5 August 1940 she left Liverpool with convoy WS 2 (Winston's Specials), evacuating 477 children to Sydney, Australia, under the Children's Overseas Reception Board until the war was over. She sailed via Cape Town; India; Singapore to where she had carried 300 troops; and Sydney. The journey was a happy one, with so much music and laughter that the Batory was dubbed the "Singing Ship" and was the subject of a book of the same name. In April 1942 British writer Roald Dahl boarded the Batory, bound for Halifax, Canada.

She was involved in the Allied invasion of Oran, Algeria in 1942 (Operation Torch). That same year she took troops to India and later took part in the Allied invasion of Sicily and southern France (Operation Dragoon), where she was the flagship of General Jean de Lattre de Tassigny, Commander-in-Chief of the French Army. She came under attack several times from the ground and the air, but managed to escape serious damage.

Dubbed the "Lucky Ship" for her military career during World War II, she was a sister ship of the less fortunate Piłsudski, which sank in November 1939 off the east coast of Scotland.

=== Postwar career ===
Returned to post-war Poland in 1946, she resumed civilian service after a refit, transporting such eminent people as Ryszard Kapuściński. From May 1949 through to January 1951, she was the subject of several political incidents in which American dockers and shipyard workers in the United States refused to unload her cargo, or to service the ship.

After these incidents, she was withdrawn from the North Atlantic route, refurbished at Hebburn for service in the tropics, and sailed in August 1951 from Gdynia and Southampton to Bombay and Karachi, via Gibraltar, Malta, Aden, and Suez. In 1957, she returned to the North Atlantic run. She continued in service until 1969, when she was decommissioned and became a floating hotel in Gdynia. However, after about a year, she was sold back to Polish Ocean Lines, and from there she was sold for scrap to Hong Kong. She left Gdynia on 31 March 1971 and arrived to the scrapyard on 26 May. On 2 June, the Polish flag was lowered and the scrapping process began. The ship had been scrapped completely by 1972.

She was replaced by a larger vessel Stefan Batory, which operated from April 1969 until 1988.

== Gallery ==
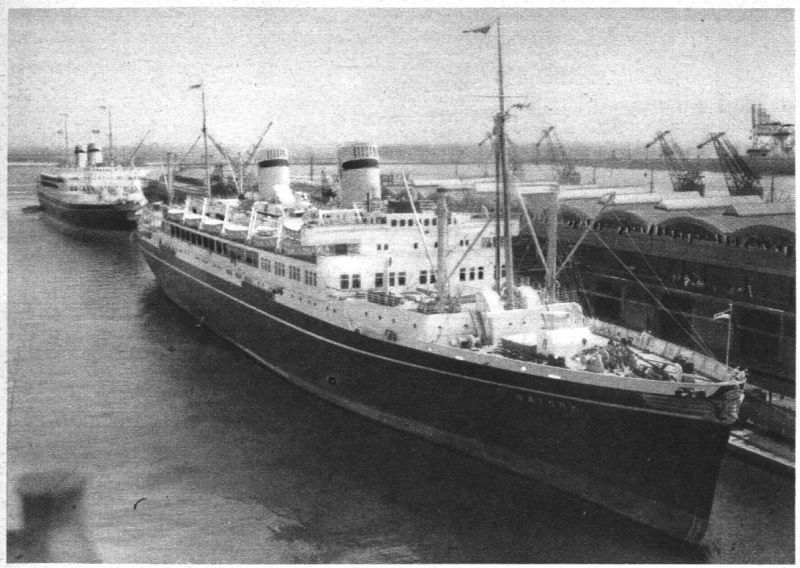
Batory in Gdynia, 1937

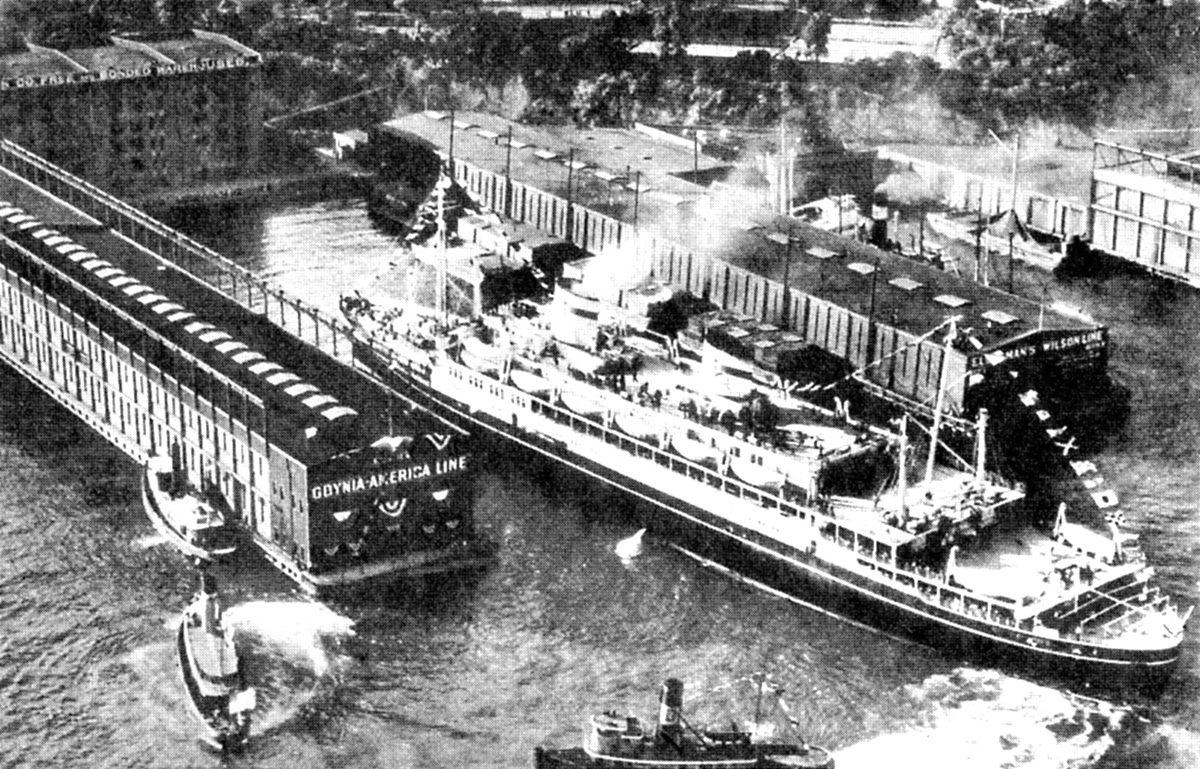
Batory arriving in New York City

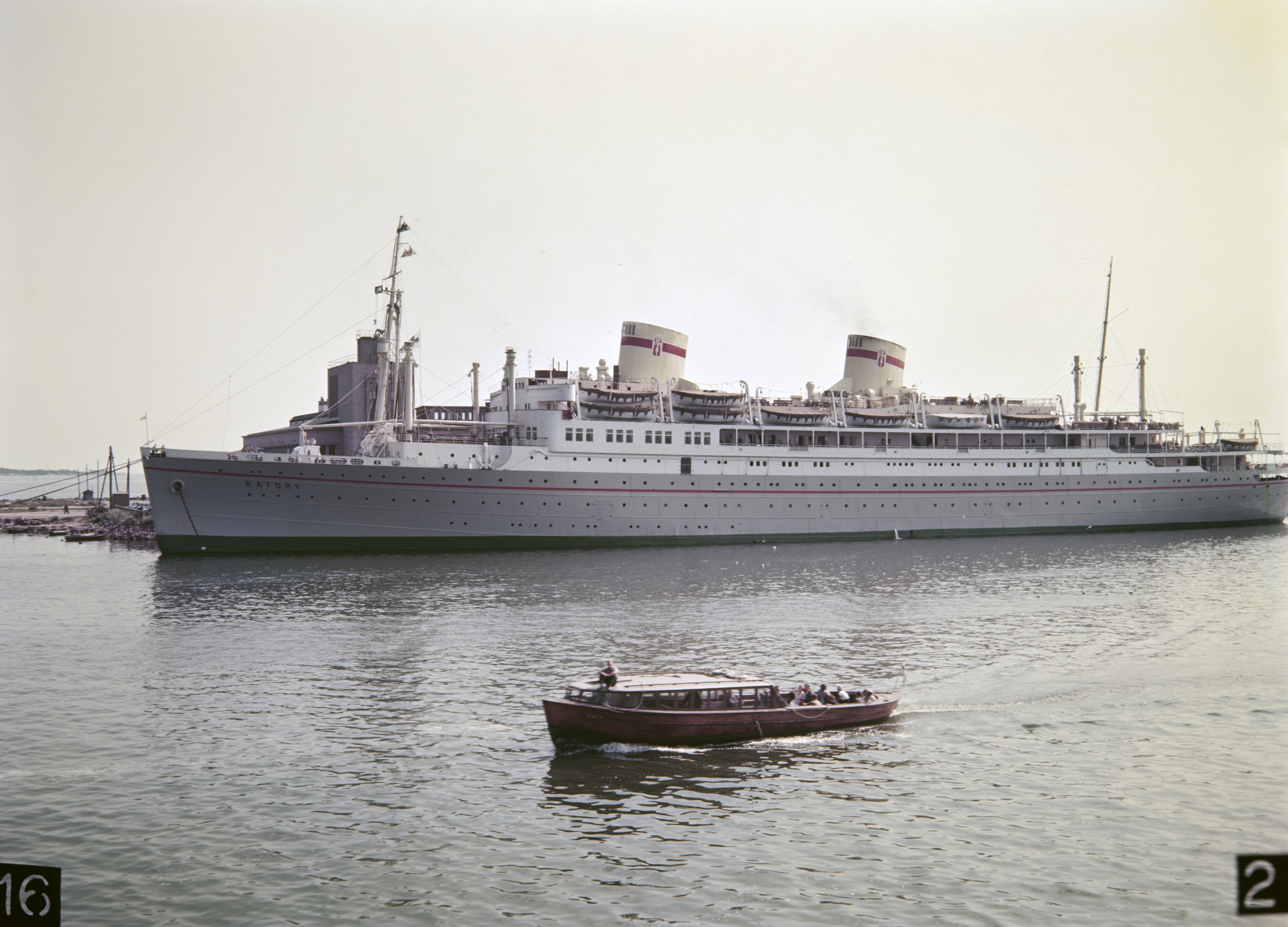
Batory in Helsinki, 1952

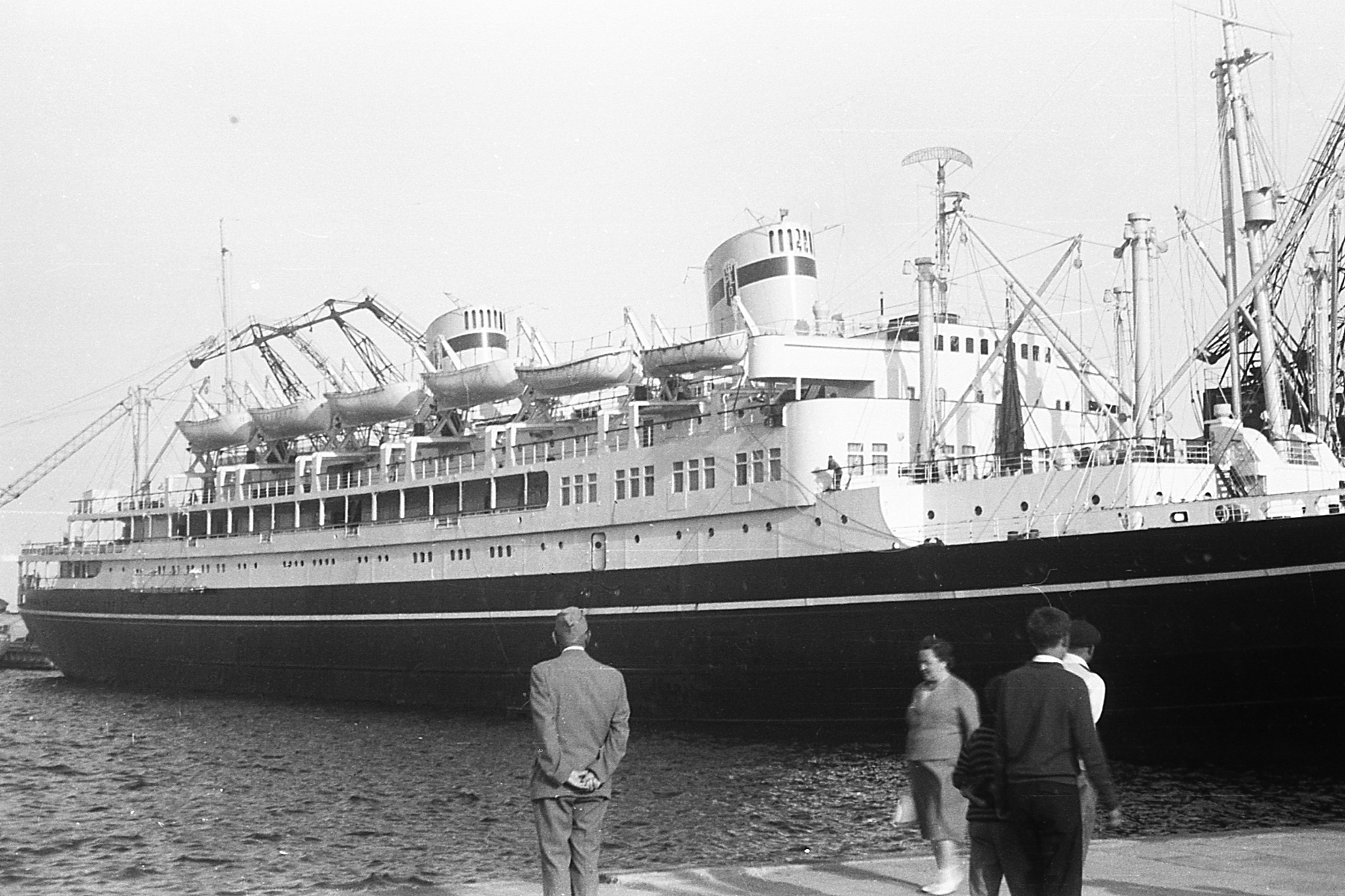
Batory in 1962

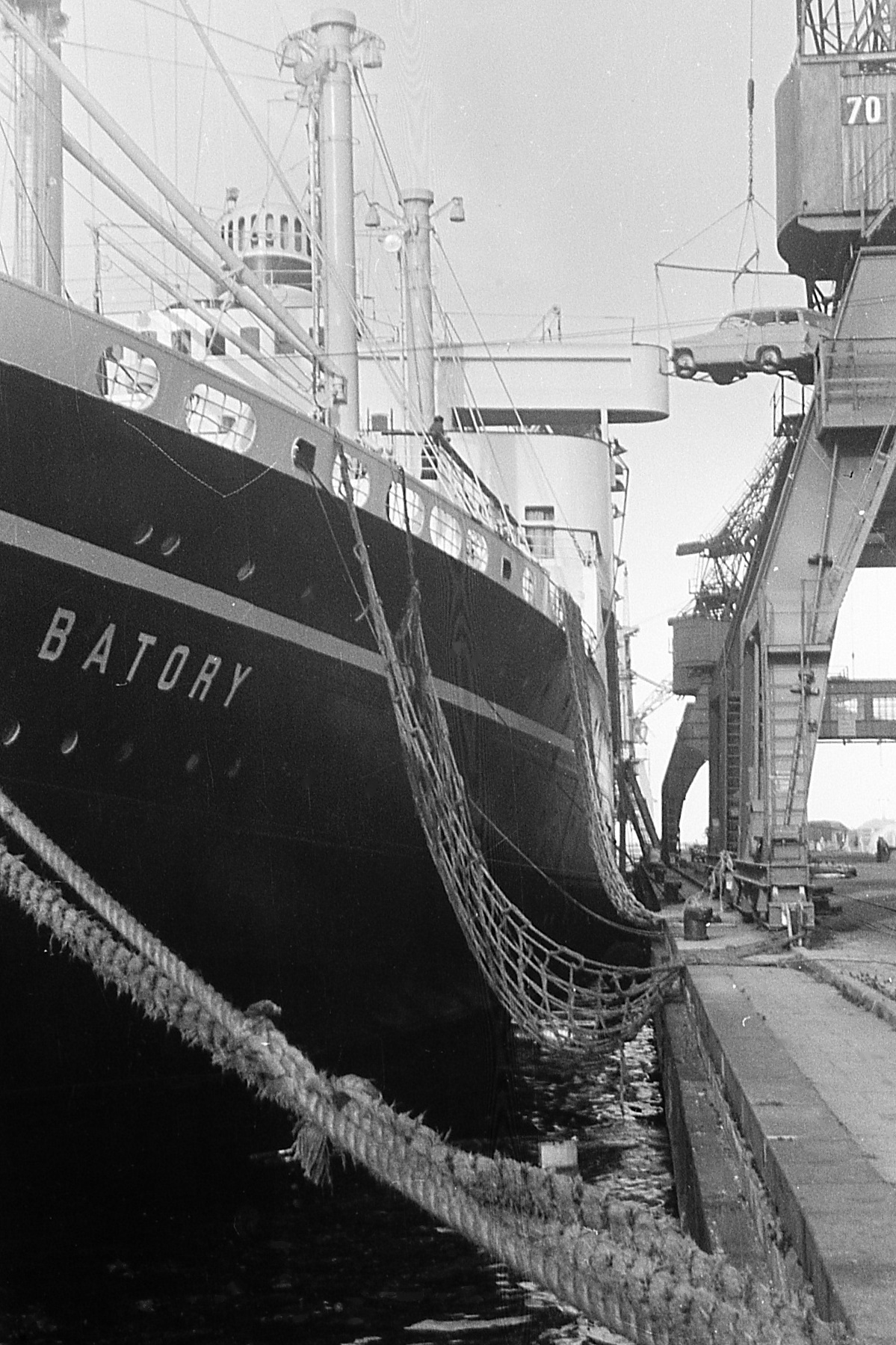
Unloading in Gdynia wharf, 1960s

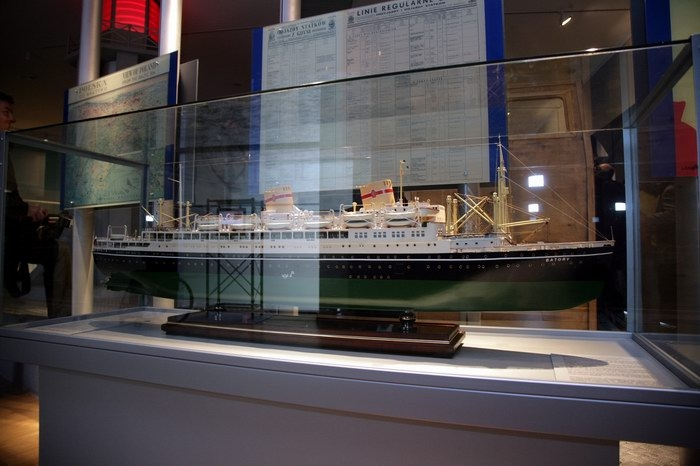
A scale model of Batory in Gdynia, 2007

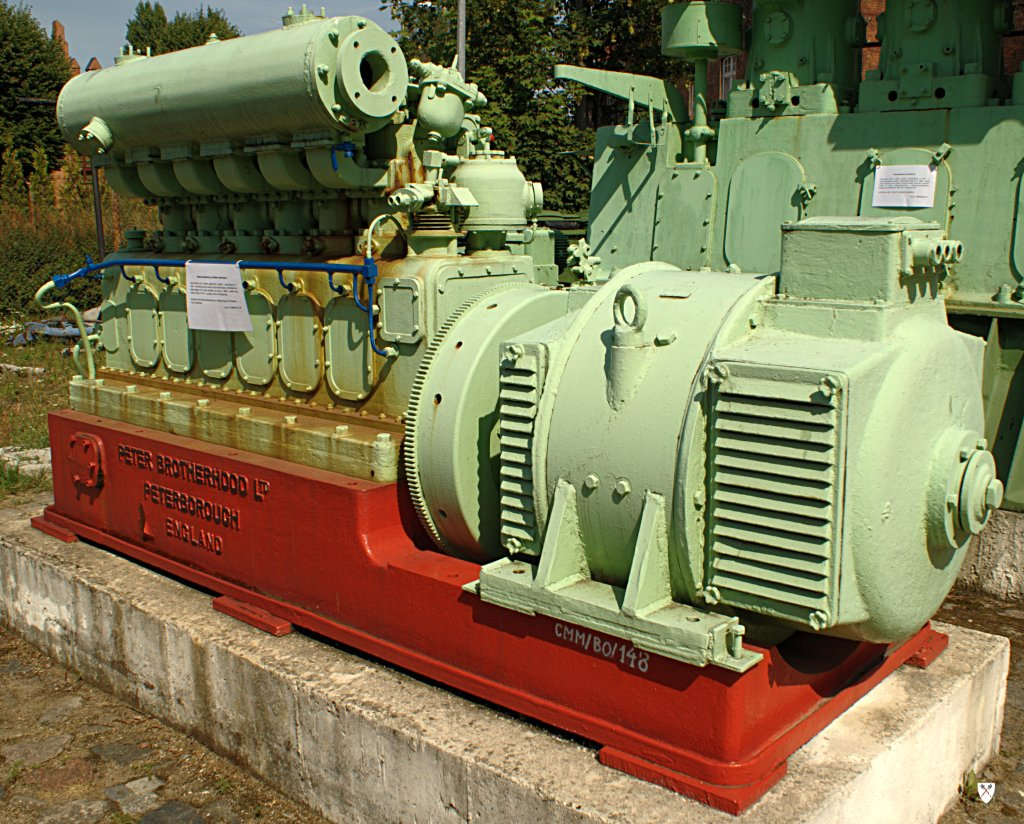
Batory's saved electrical generator in National Maritime Museum, Gdańsk

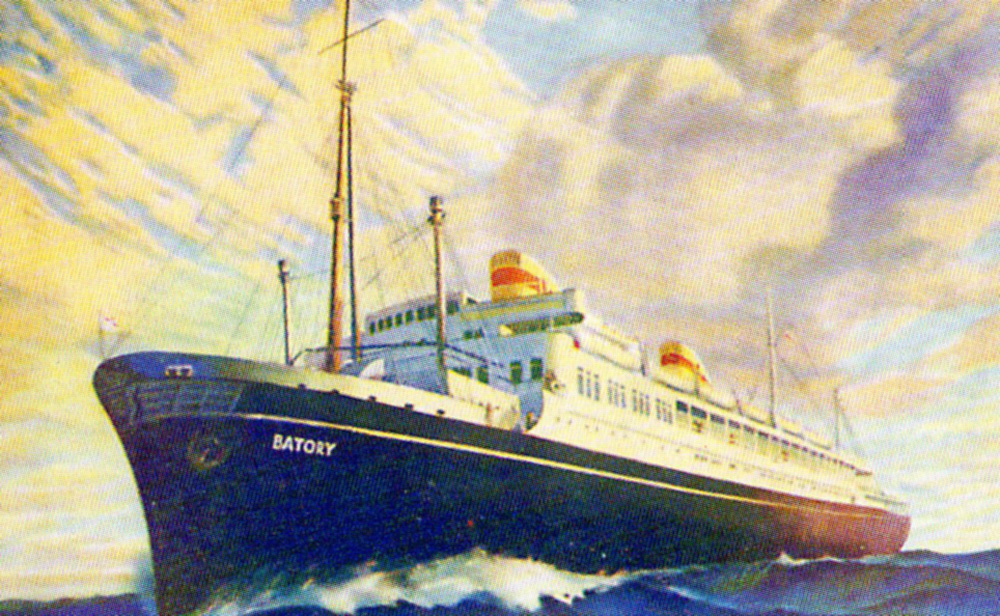
Batory postcard

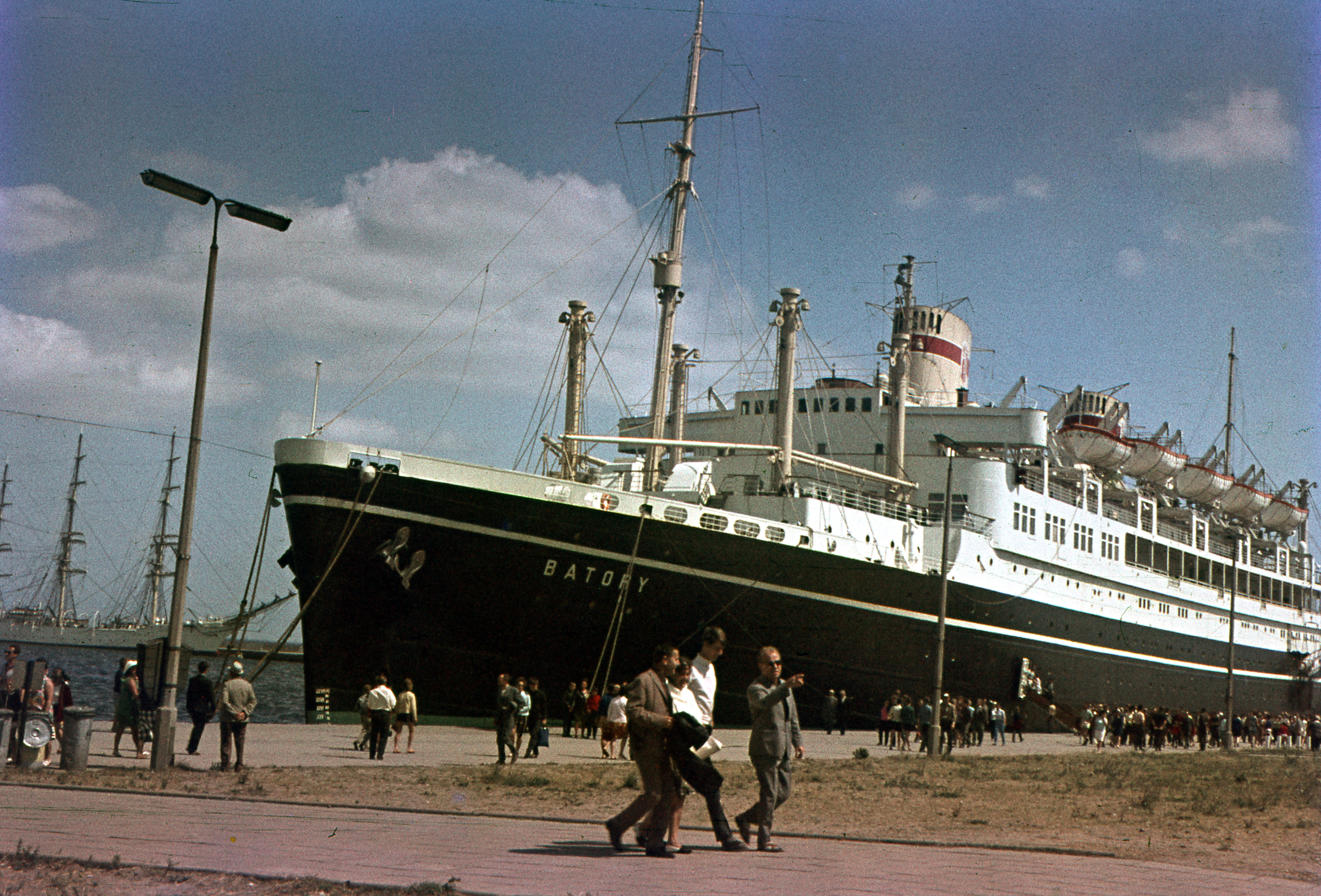
Batory in 1965

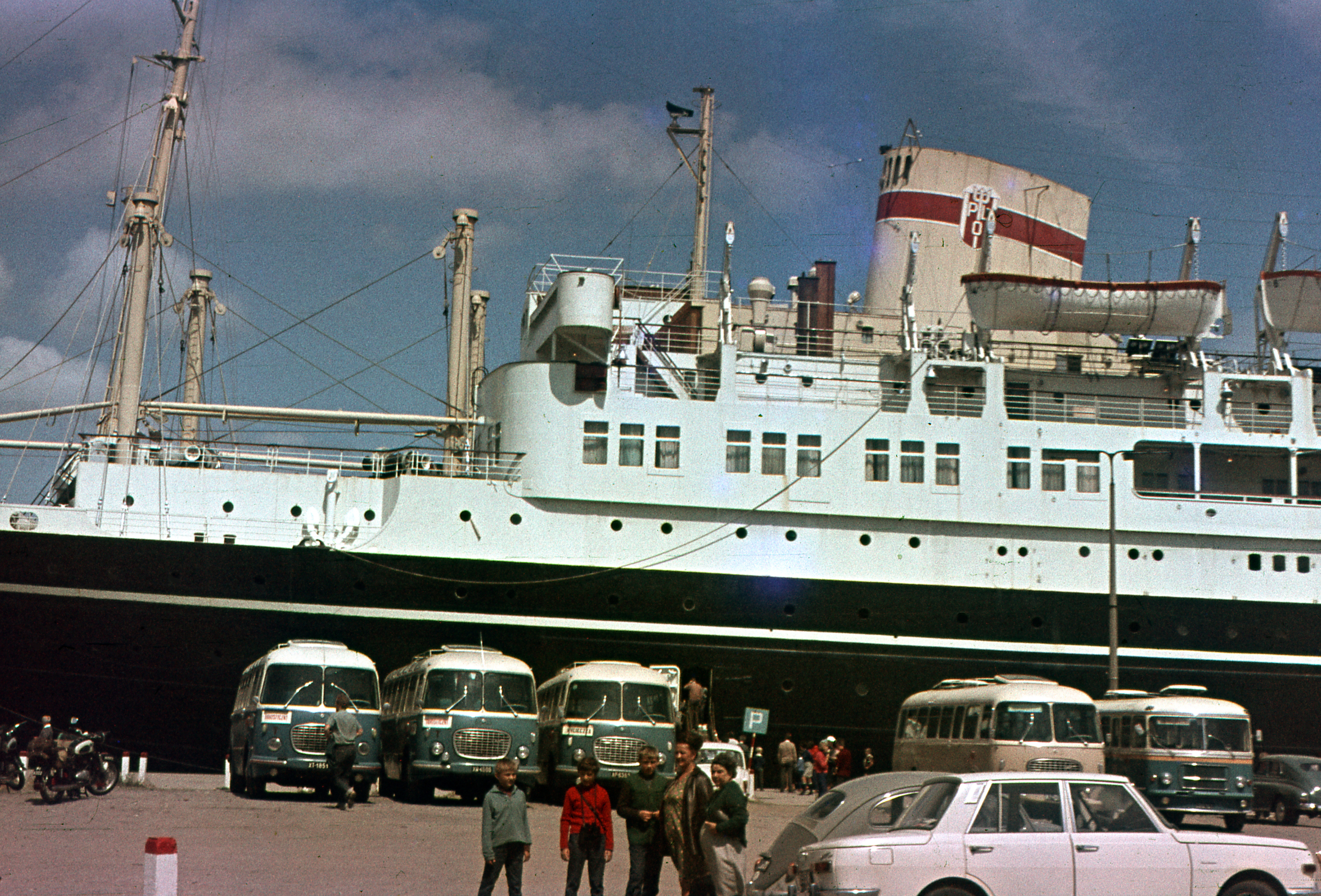
Batory in 1965
