= TSS Stefan Batory =

1952 ocean liner built in the Netherlands

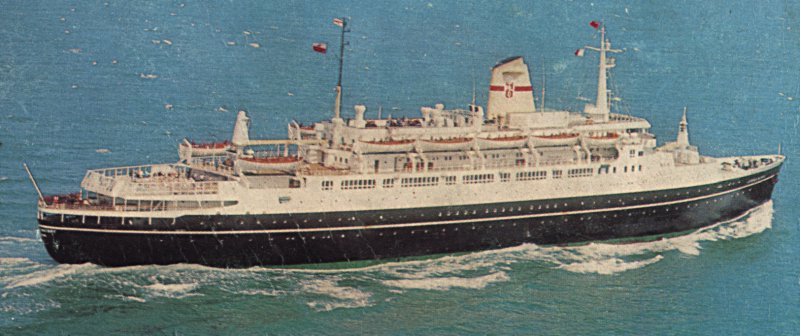
- TSS Stefan Batory

History
- Name: 1951–1968: Maasdam IV
- Owner: Holland America Lines
- Port of registry: Rotterdam, Netherlands
- Ordered: 1950
- Builder: Wilton-Fijenoord, Schiedam
- Yard number: 733
- Laid down: 19 December 1950
- Launched: 5 April 1952
- Maiden voyage: 11 August 1952 Rotterdam—Southampton—Le Havre—Montreal—New York City
- In service: 1952
- Out of service: May 1968
- Identification: 5216147
- Name: 1968–1990: Stefan Batory
- Operator: 1968–1988: Polish Ocean Lines; 1988–1990: Hellenic Polish Line
- Port of registry: (Poland) Gdynia
- Route: 1968–1988: Gdynia—Montreal
- In service: 1968
- Out of service: 1990
- Name: 1990–2000 Stefan
- Owner: Stena AB
- In service: 1990
- Out of service: 1992
- Identification: IMO number: 5216147
- Fate: Scrapped Aliağa, Turkey
- Notes: Temporarily renamed La Delicias for filming in 1991

General characteristics
- Type: Ocean liner
- Tonnage: 15,015 GRT
- Length: 153.4 m (503 ft 3 in)
- Beam: 21.1 m (69 ft 3 in)
- Draught: 8.8 m (28 ft 10 in)
- Decks: 10
- Installed power: 6,256 kW (8,389 hp)
- Speed: 17 knots (31 km/h; 20 mph)
- Capacity: 783; First class: 39; Tourist class: 734
- Crew: 336

TSS Stefan Batory was an ocean liner built in the Netherlands in 1952 as Maasdam. It was operated by Holland America Lines and later Polish Ocean Lines. It remained in service until 1988 and was scrapped in 2000 in Turkey.

== History ==
=== Holand America Line ===
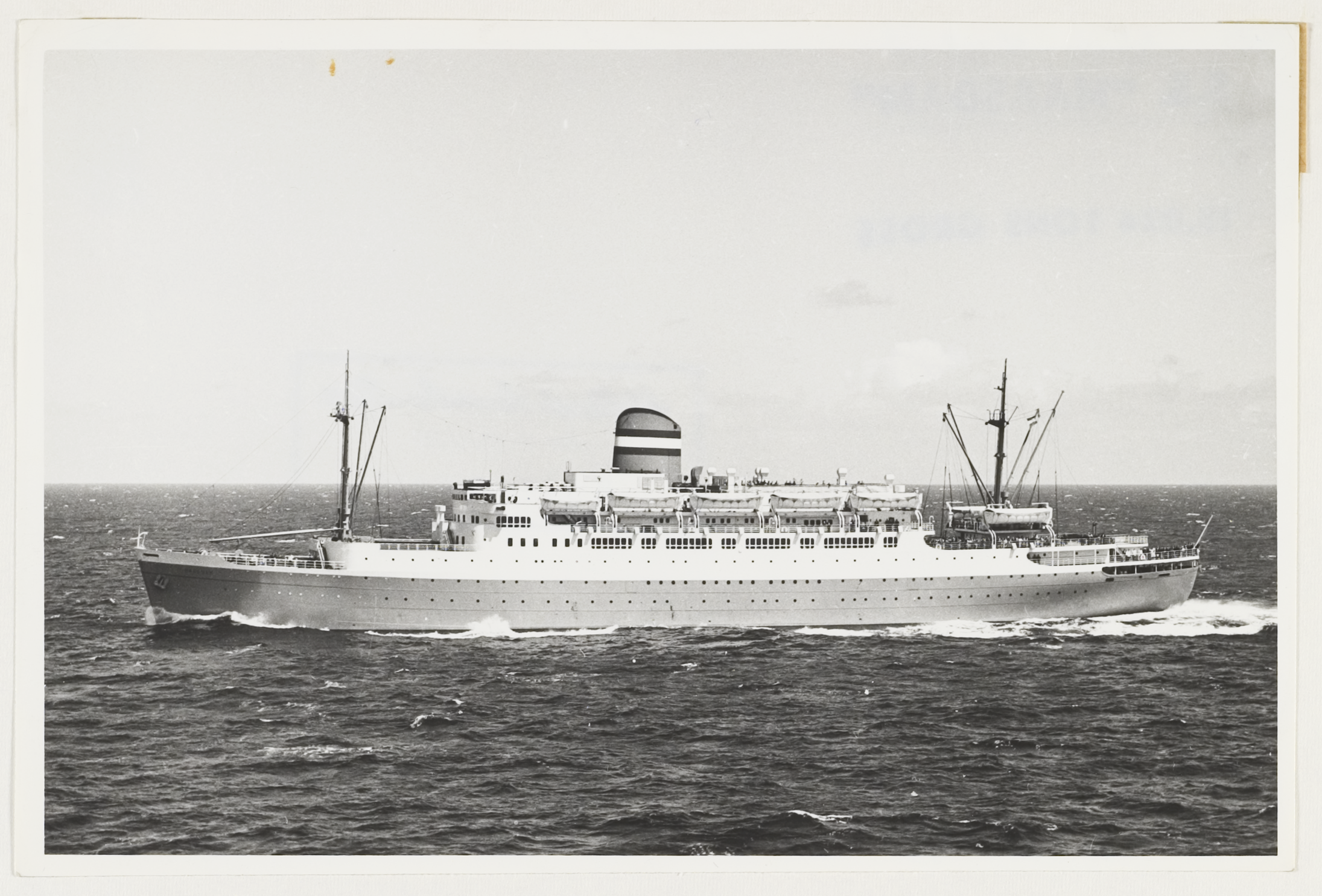
Maasdam in 1952

The Maasdam entered service as the fourth Holland America Line (HA) liner to serve under that name. It was initially used to service the Dutch East Indies by the Holland America Line. The ship was originally planned as a freighter under the name of Diemerdyk. A resurgence in transatlantic travel resulted in a change of plans during construction and it was completed as a passenger liner.

The liner later began trans-Atlantic service between West Germany and New York. In 1962, Lee Harvey Oswald, his wife Marina and their daughter were brought to the United States from the Soviet Union on board Maasdam. On 15 February 1963, in the Weser estuary off West Germany, the liner struck the wreck of the British ship Harborough, which had sunk in 1959 after striking the wreck of the Soviet ship Kholmogry. Maasdam, carrying 500 persons, was safely evacuated despite a bad list, then was safely sailed to Bremerhaven by a skeleton crew.

=== Polish Ocean Lines ===
The ship was acquired by the Polish government in June 1968, as a replacement for the then obsolete Batory. The ship was rechristened Stefan Batory, after Stefan Batory, king of Poland from 1533–1586. After she was refitted and renamed at Gdańsk, she became the flagship of the Polish Ocean Lines (1969–1988). She entered service on 11 April 1969 and mainly sailed from Gdynia–Copenhagen–Rotterdam–London–Montreal–Southampton–Rotterdam–Copenhagen–Gdynia. According to the contemporary press, on her first arrival in Rotterdam as Stefan Batory in 1969, the former owners of her expressed their interest in buying her back from Polish owners for service under the former flag.

Stefan Batory remained in regular service until 1988. During that time, trans-Atlantic travel changed to use passenger airplanes and saw the end of the era of trans-Atlantic liners. By 1988, Stefan Batory was one of the only trans-Atlantic passenger liners sailing regularly scheduled voyages between Europe and North America. The ship was used briefly for ocean cruises until 1990, when it was sold to the Swedish government.

=== Final Years ===
The vessel was renamed Stefan and used to house asylum seekers in Gothenburg from 1990 to 1992. Unused after 1992, Stefan was scrapped at Aliağa, Turkey beginning in May 2000.

== Onboard travel ==
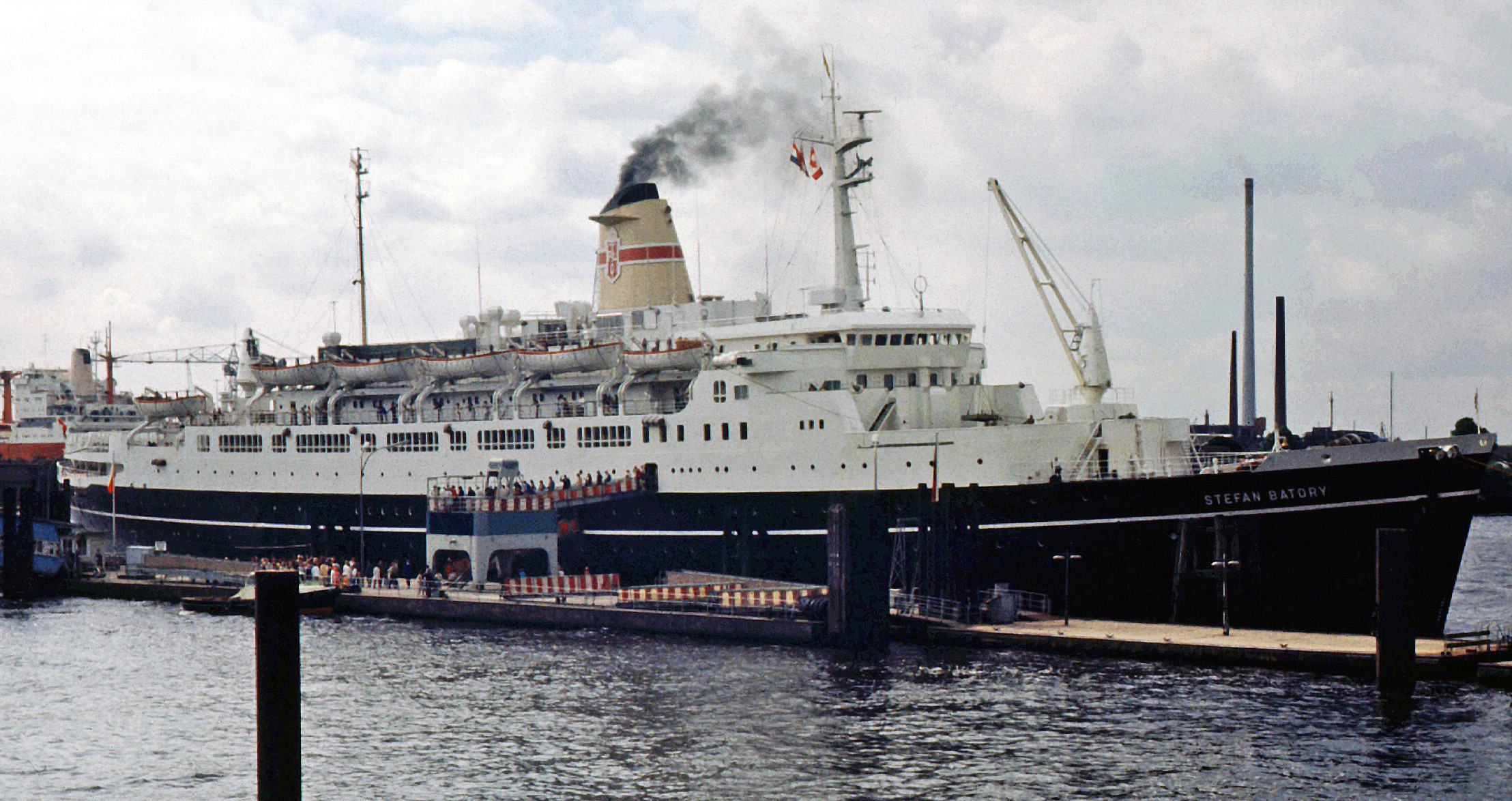
Stefan Batory in Hamburg in 1973

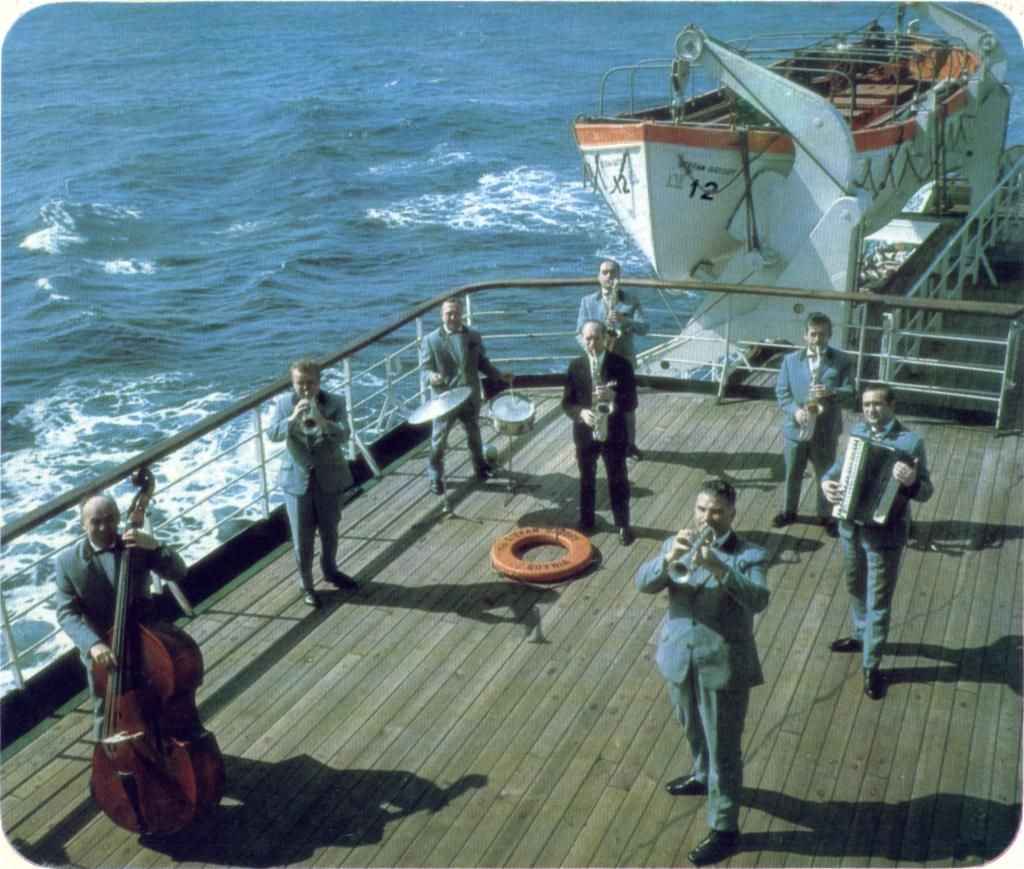
Stefan Batory's orchestra conducted by Bronisław Dyszkiewicz

What gave a unique atmosphere during Polish transatlantic cruises were the orchestras. The orchestras, for many years associated with Stefan Batory, were directed by Czesław Słabolepszy, Paweł Laskowski, Janusz Popławski and Bronisław Dyszkiewicz. From 1969, passengers were entertained by two orchestras – an octet playing mid-morning symphonic concerts and evening balls in a large ballroom and a quartet, which played to guests in the afternoon (English tea time). The smaller band played during dinner and evening dance in a small salon (from 9.00 pm till 2.00 am). There were two notable orchestras on the Stefan Batory: guitarist Jerzy Kowalewski' band and a well-known group from Katowice under the direction of saxophonist/clarinettist Bronisław Dyszkiewicz. Another prominent musician playing on Batory, and later Stefan Batory, was Alojzy Musiał, a star of Polish jazz music in the 1950s and 1960s.

== Technical data ==
- 10 decks
- Tonnage — 15,024 BRT
- Length — 153.4 m (503 ft).
- Width — 21.0 m (69 ft).
- Height — 21.0 m (69 ft).
- Speed — 17 knots
- Passengers — 39 1st class; 734 tourist class.
- Crew — 336.
- Engines — steam turbines.
- Stabilizers to reduce heeling
