= Pierwsze wyjście z mroku =

Studio album by Coma
- Released: May 17, 2004
- Recorded: 11–18 November 2003 (instruments); December 2003 (vocals)
- Length: 65:20
- Producer: BMG Poland

Coma chronology
Skaczemy / Pasażer (single) (2000)	Pierwsze wyjście z mroku (2004)	Zaprzepaszczone siły wielkiej armii świętych znaków (2006)

Pierwsze wyjście z mroku (English: First Emergence from Darkness) is the debut studio album by the Polish rock band Coma, released on May 17, 2004.

The album consists of both ballad-like tracks ("Leszek Żukowski", "Pasażer", "100 tysięcy jednakowych miast") and harder songs (e.g. "Czas globalnej niepogody", "Zbyszek").

In 2005, the album was granted Polish music award Fryderyk in Rock category.

== Track listing ==
No.	Title	Length
1.	"Leszek Żukowski"	8:15
2.	"Sierpień [August]"	5:50
3.	"Chaos kontrolowany [Controlled Chaos]"	4:31
4.	"Pierwsze wyjście z mroku [First Emergence from Darkness]"	5:54
5.	"Pasażer [Passenger]"	5:10
6.	"Ocalenie [Salvation]"	5:25
7.	"Spadam [I'm Falling]"	4:57
8.	"Czas globalnej niepogody [Time of Global Foul Weather]"	4:12
9.	"Nie wierzę skurwysynom [I Don't Believe Sons of Bitches]"	5:57
10.	"Sto tysięcy jednakowych miast [A Hundred Thousand Identical Towns]"	6:43
11.	"Zbyszek"	5:24
12.	"Skaczemy [Let's jump (lit. We're jumping)]"	3:04
Total length:		65:20

== Charts ==
Chart (2004)	Peak position
Polish Albums (ZPAV)	7
