= OMI Charger =

Coordinates: 29.3503°N 94.7529°W

History

United States
- Name: OMI Charger
- Operator: OMI Corporation
- Builder: Bethlehem Steel Corporation
- Launched: 10 June 1969
- Identification: IMO number: 6921311
- Fate: Sank in Galveston, Texas on October 9, 1993

General characteristics
- Class & type: Steel hull oil tanker
- Tonnage: 34,485 DWT
- Length: 631 ft 1 in (192.35 m)
- Beam: 90.1 ft (27.5 m)
- Draught: 48.9 ft (14.9 m)
- Propulsion: steam turbine 15,000 hp (11,000 kW)

OMI Charger was a single-hulled oil tanker built in 1969 and used by the OMI Corporation.

== Disaster ==
On October 9, 1993 while the tanker was anchored at Boliver Roads near Galveston, Texas, work began on sealing a previously discovered leak in a cargo tank. When a crew member lit an arc welder inside a tank, it ignited gasoline vapors, causing a tremendous explosion which killed three crew members and injured seven. The subsequent fire burned for five hours, and the ship was a total loss.

A US Coast Guard investigation determined that the cargo tank had been improperly cleared and insufficiently tested prior to the incident.
