= David Matuszak =

American writer

David F. Matuszak is a self-published author, longboard skier, retired teacher and coach. He is best known for authoring The Cowboy's Trail Guide to Westerns and Nelson Point: Portrait of a Northern Gold Rush Town. His most recent book, San Onofre: Memories of a Legendary Surfing Beach focuses on the surfing culture and history of San Onofre, California.

During his tenure at Yucaipa High School, Matuszak developed the Kinesiology and Physical Education department into one of California's model programs. In 1991, he was named California's co-physical educator of the year. He retired from Yucaipa in 2015.

== Bibliography ==
- San Onofre: Memories of a Legendary Surfing Beach
- The Cowboy's Trail Guide to Westerns
- Nelson Point: Portrait of a Northern Gold Rush Town
- The Elementary Teacher's Guide to the Gold Rush
- The Physical Educator's Guide to Portfolios
