= MS Stalowa Wola =

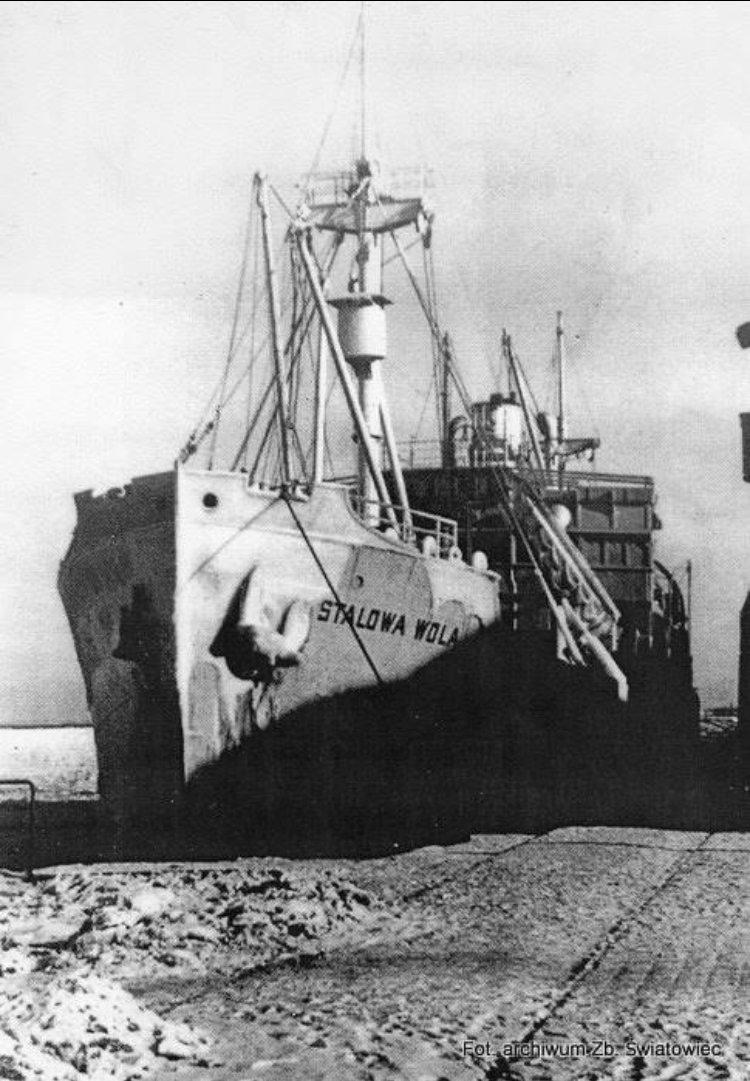

History

Poland
- Name: MS Stalowa Wola
- Operator: Gdynia America Line
- Launched: 1924
- Completed: March 1925
- Acquired: July 1939
- Fate: Sunk, 19 March 1956

General characteristics
- Tonnage: 3133 GRT, 1811 NRT
- Length: 96.50 m (316 ft 7 in)
- Beam: 14.50 m (47 ft 7 in)
- Draft: 6.5 m (21 ft 4 in)
- Installed power: diesel, 1400 hp
- Speed: 8.5 knots (15.7 km/h; 9.8 mph)
- Capacity: 12
- Crew: 28

The MS Stalowa Wola (formerly known as Henry Horn, Pine Court, and Rio Pardo) was a Polish freighter during the Second World War. The ship was bought in Norway by Gdynia America Line; originally she was to be called Bogumin, finally was named after a city in central Poland, by then a newly built centre of heavy industry.

Capitulation of France found the ship in Dakar. Commanded by captain Strzembosz, she escaped on July 5th 1940, although challenged by the shore defences. Afterwards, till the end of World War II Stalowa Wola participated in over 40 Atlantic convoys. Returned to Poland after the end of the war, the ship ran on lines to South America and Levant, and then was used as a tramper.

The ship sunk on 19 March 1956 during a violent storm off the coast of Spain. On March 18th Stalowa Wola sprung a leak and the load of iron ore she carried, turned into sludge, which movements were impossible to balance using the tanks. The crew escaped in a boat, all hands were saved by MV Hugo Kołłątaj; abandoned ship drifted for twelve more hours before sinking at 44°54′N 10°09′W.
