= Piotr Rogucki =

Polish singer, musician, and actor (born 1978)

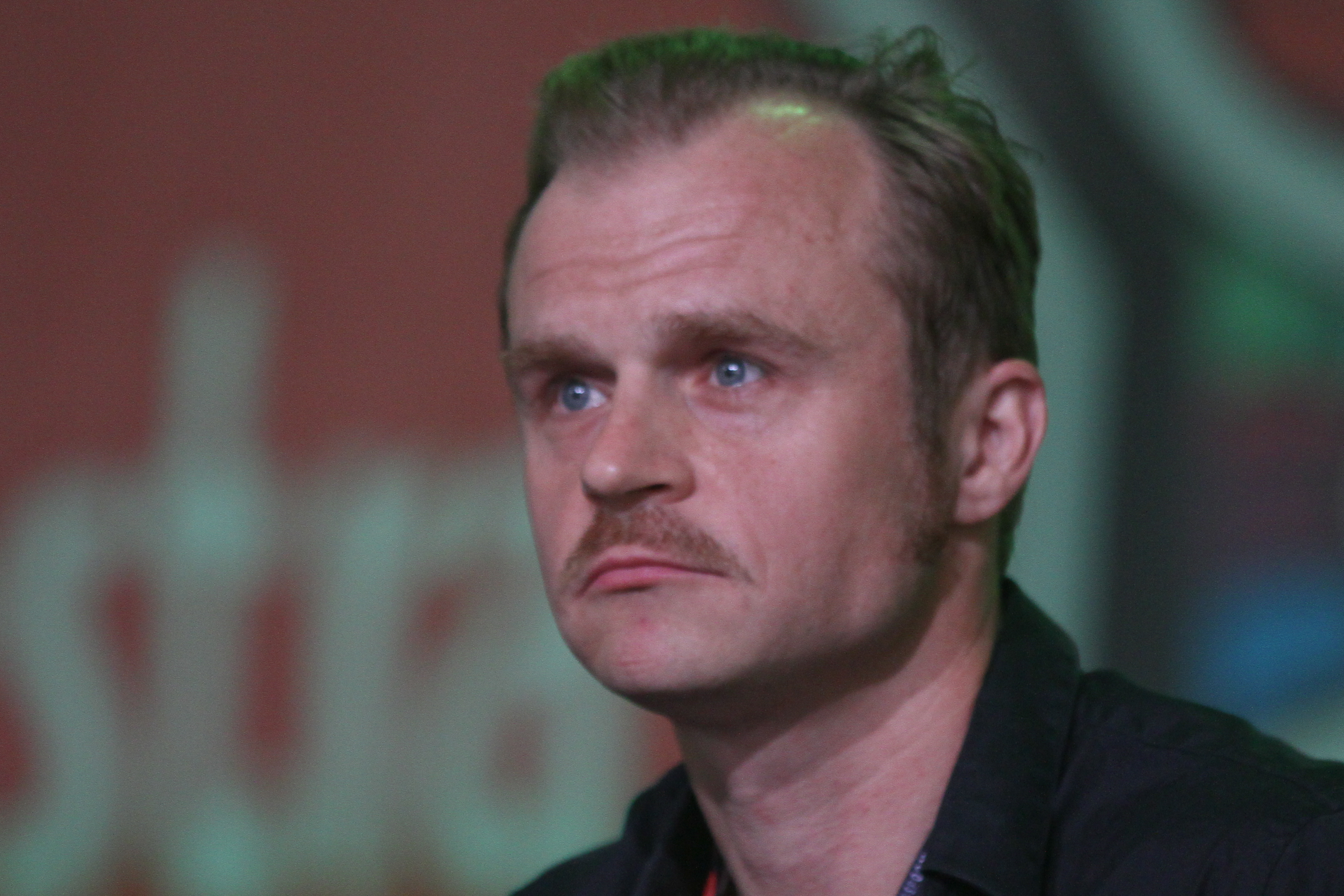
- Piotr Rogucki in 2024
- Born: 5 May 1978 (age 48); Łódź, Poland
- Education: Ludwik Solski Academy for the Dramatic Arts
- Occupations: Musician, singer, actor
- Years active: 1998–present
- Musical career
- Genres: Rock, sung poetry
- Instruments: Vocals, guitar
- Label: Mystic Production
- Website: piotrrogucki.com

Piotr Rogucki (born 5 May 1978 in Łódź) is a Polish singer, musician, and actor, best known as the leader of rock band Coma. Rogucki is a member of the Polish Society of the Phonographic Industry.

== History ==
Rogucki graduated from Ludwik Solski Academy for the Dramatic Arts. He started his career by performing at various artistic previews and festivals, where he has received many awards.

He has released nine studio albums with Coma: Pierwsze wyjście z mroku (2004), Zaprzepaszczone siły wielkiej armii świętych znaków (2006), Hipertrofia (2008), Excess (2010), an untitled album commonly known as Czerwony album (2011), Don't Set Your Dogs on Me (2013), 2005 YU55 (2016), Metal Ballads vol. 1 (2017) and Sen o 7 szklankach (2019). He has also released two solo studio albums, Loki – Wizja Dźwięku (2011) and 95–2003 (2012).

Apart from his musical career, Rogucki is also an actor. He has performed on stage of TR Warszawa, and starred in several films and TV series.

== Discography ==
=== Studio albums ===
Title	Album details	Peak chart positions
Title	Album details	POL
Loki – Wizja Dźwięku	Date: 21 March 2011; Label: Mystic Production	2
95–2003	Date: 11 June 2012; Label: Mystic Production	1
J.P. Śliwa	Date: 16 October 2015; Label: Agora S.A.	8

=== Music videos ===
Title	Year	Director	Album	Ref.
"Szatany"	2011	Mateusz Winkiel	Loki – wizja dźwięku	
"Wizja dźwięku"	2011	Mateusz Winkiel	Loki – wizja dźwięku	
"Piosenka pisana nocą"	2012	Mateusz Winkiel	95-2003	
"Dobrze"	2015	Zosia Zija i Jacek Pióro	J.P. Śliwa	
"Całuj się”	2016	Zosia Zija i Jacek Pióro	J.P. Śliwa	
"Płyń”	2016	Bartosz Piotrowski	J.P. Śliwa	

=== Guest appearances ===
Year	Song	Artist	Album
2013	"Zaufanie"	Mam Na Imię Aleksander	Nie myśl o mnie źle
2013	"Karmelove"	Marcelina	Wschody / Zachody
2014	"Whole World Is Watching"	Within Temptation	Hydra (Polish edition)
2014	"Ewolucja albo śmierć"	Frontside	Sprawa jest osobista

== Filmography ==
Credits adapted from Filmweb database.

=== Films ===
Year	Title	Role
2000	Syzyfowe prace	Student
2005	Doskonałe popołudnie	Jacek
2005	Hamlet	Hamlet
2007	And Along Come Tourists	Krzysztof, Ania's brother
2010	Skrzydlate świnie	Mariusz Nowacki

=== TV series ===
Year	Title	Role
2000	Syzyfowe prace	Student
2006	Oficerowie	Manolo
2008	Trzeci oficer	Manolo
2009–2011	Czas honoru	Chudy
2010	Duch w dom	Ghost
2011	Hotel 52	Henio
2011	Chichot losu	Sgt. Jakubczyk
2012	Misja Afghanistan	Marcin Melbor ("Malbor")
2013	Medics	Józek, Jivan's friend
2013	2XL	Alek
