= MS Jan Heweliusz =

Norwegian-built Polish ferry that sank on 14 January 1993 in Baltic Sea

Coordinates: 54°36′N 14°13′E

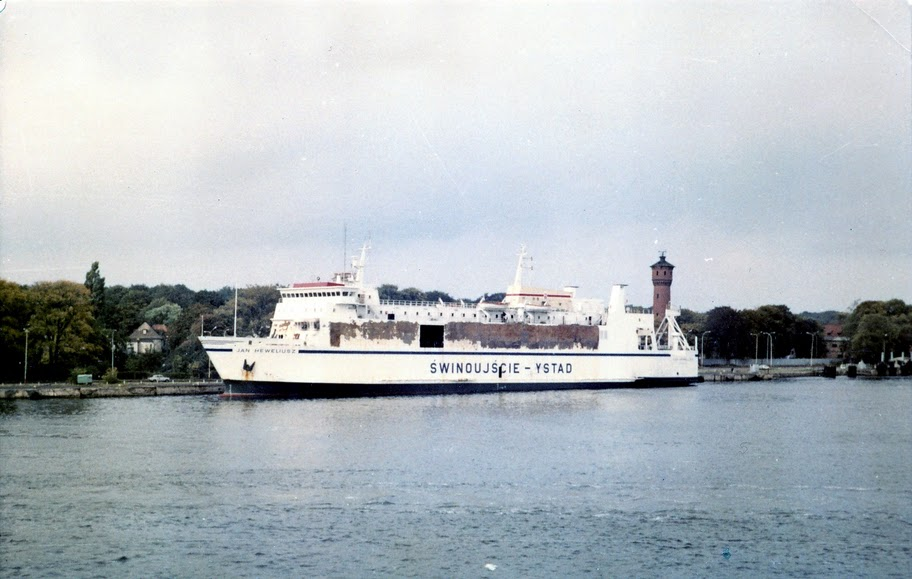
- MS Jan Heweliusz in 1986, damaged after a fire

History

Poland
- Name: MS Jan Heweliusz
- Namesake: Johannes Hevelius
- Owner: Polish Ocean Lines
- Operator: Euroafrica Shipping Lines
- Builder: Trosvik Verksted A/S
- Launched: 29 January 1977
- Completed: 1977
- In service: July 1977
- Out of service: 14 January 1993
- Identification: IMO number: 7527904 Call sign: SQIK
- Fate: Sank in the Baltic Sea on 14 January 1993

General characteristics of MS Jan Heweliusz
- Class & type: RO/RO ferry
- Tonnage: 3,015 BRT
- Length: 125.66 m
- Beam: 17.02 m
- Installed power: CODAD 4 × Sulzer 10AL25/30, 7,400 PS total
- Speed: 16.75 knots
- Capacity: 2,035 tons (up to 47 trucks)

MS Jan Heweliusz was a Norwegian-built Polish ferry named after astronomer Johannes Hevelius (Polish: Jan Heweliusz) that served on the route Ystad–Świnoujście. It was built in Norway in 1977 and was owned by Polish Ocean Lines and operated by its subsidiary company Euroafrica Shipping Lines.

In the early hours of 14 January 1993, it capsized and sank in 27 metres (88 feet) of water off Cape Arcona off the coast of Rügen in the Baltic Sea while sailing towards Ystad with 65 passengers and crew. The accident claimed the lives of 20 crewmen and 36 passengers. Ten bodies were never found. Nine people were rescued. The sinking of Jan Heweliusz is the deadliest peacetime maritime disaster involving a Polish ship.

== 1986 fire ==
In September 1986, the ship suffered a serious fire. No one on board was injured, but the ship was heavily damaged. The ship was repaired by coating the damaged areas with 60 tons of concrete, which increased the weight of the ship and dangerously affected its stability: this was apparently an illegal method.

== 1993 sinking ==
At 04:10 on 14 January 1993, the ship started listing in hurricane-force winds, estimated at 180 kilometres per hour (50 m/s; 110 mph). It capsized at 05:12. The waves were up to 6 metres (20 ft) high and ferries in the nearby port of Sassnitz had been cancelled. Prior to its sinking, Jan Heweliusz had been involved in 28 incidents, including collisions with fishing boats, listing, engine failure and the aforementioned fire in 1986. It had ballast problems and had also damaged its hull in Ystad during docking, but this was not reported to the port authorities and only makeshift repairs were made. It sailed two hours late, carrying 10 railway carriages from five European countries.

The Marine Chamber of Appeals in Gdynia blamed the accident on the poor technical condition of the ship, with the captain, who died in the accident, also being blamed for allowing the ship to sail in such an unseaworthy state.

In 2005, the European Court of Human Rights in Strasbourg ruled that the official investigation of the sinking was not impartial and granted €4,600 in damages each to eleven relatives of the victims.

The wreck of the ship is located at a depth of 27 metres (89 feet) and is frequently visited by divers.

== In popular culture ==
In 2025, Netflix released a five-part miniseries based on the 1993 disaster, titled Heweliusz.

== See also ==
- List of disasters in Poland by death toll
- List of roll-on/roll-off vessel accidents
- ORP Heweliusz – Survey ship of the Polish Navy
