= Coma (band) =

Polish rock band

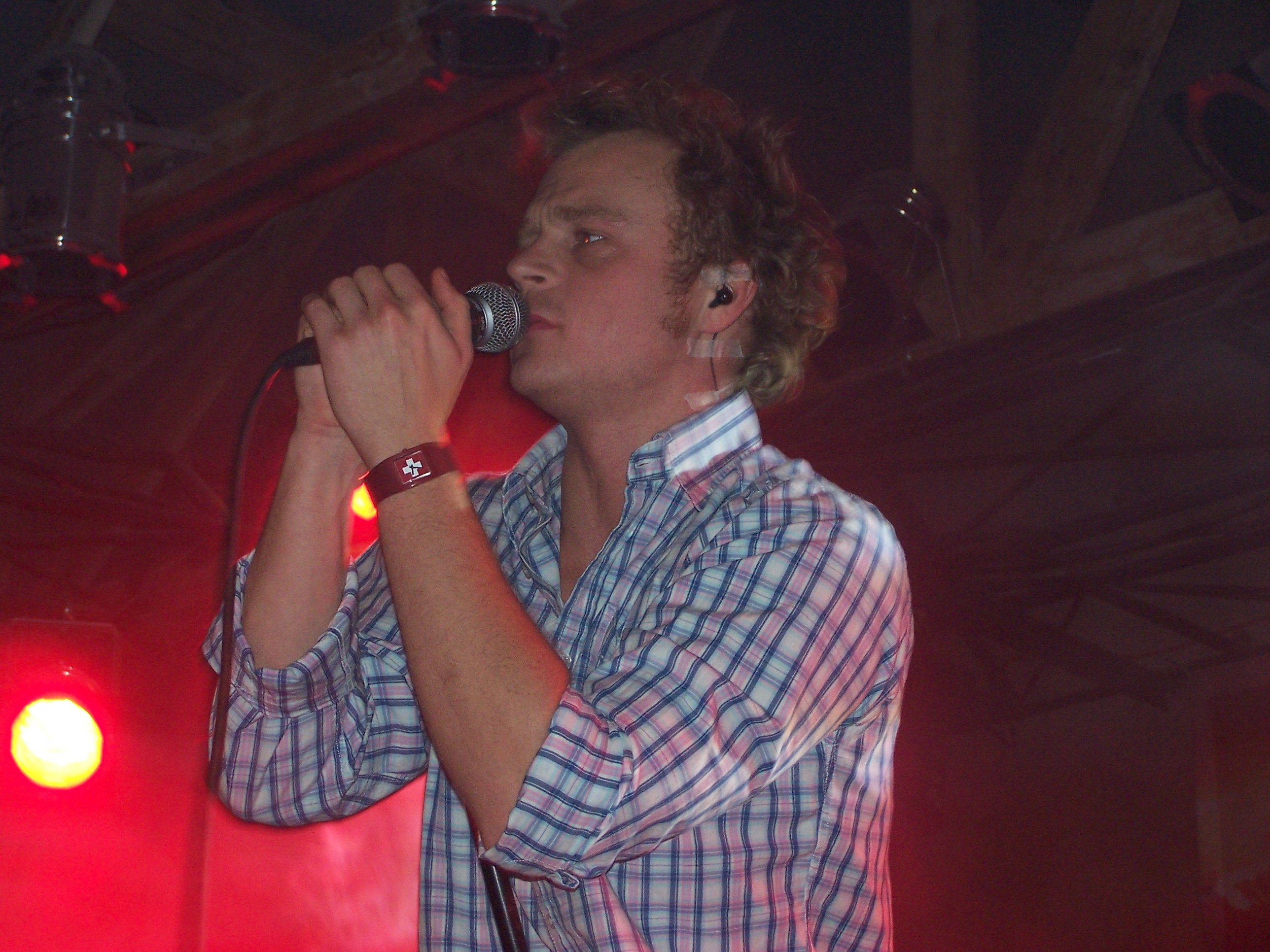
- Piotr Rogucki during concert in MegaClub in Katowice.

Background information
- Origin: Łódź, Poland
- Genres: Rock
- Years active: 1998–2019; 2024-
- Labels: BMG Poland; Sony BMG Music Entertainment Poland; Mystic Production
- Past members: Piotr Rogucki; Rafał Matuszak; Dominik Witczak; Marcin Kobza; Adam Marszałkowski; Paweł Cieślak
- Website: coma.art.pl

Coma is a Polish rock band which was founded in June 1998 in Łódź. It is one of the most successful rock bands on the Polish music scene of the last decade. As of 2013, the band has released four Polish-language studio albums (three of which have topped the Polish sales chart OLiS), two English-language studio albums, and two live albums. It disbanded in 2019.

The name "Coma" was chosen at random: the band members tossed a coin to decide on it, as they had an appointment for an interview with Radio Łódź.

== History ==
=== Early days ===
During their first rehearsals they named the band Voo Doo Art, but it did not catch on. The band started off with Dominik Witczak on guitar and Tomasz Stasiak on drums. They had played together earlier in a band enigmatically called Ozoz. After Ozoz had fallen apart, Witczak and Stasiak tried to form a band which would play music inspired by Illusion, Pearl Jam, Led Zeppelin, etc. Yet finding a bass player turned out to be problematic. However hard they tried, they didn't get along with any of the candidates for this honourable post. They had to wait quite a long time for God to send them Rafał Matuszak, who apart from being a pretty good musician and partygoer, turned out to live 300m from Witczak. The three guys were fascinated with one another. They had rehearsals a few times a week. Dominik, Tomasz and Rafał made up their minds to rock together until their dying day, and then they cut their veins and... sealed their decision with blood.

In this way the hybrid was created and functioned under the name "Voo Doo Art". The next to join the band was Wojciech Grenda, whom Dominik and Tomasz knew from Ozoz. After they welcomed him warmly, their friendship developed very quickly. To complete the picture, the members needed someone who could sing. But here their expectations were sky high. Stasiak, Witczak and Grenda had once played with Agnieszka Unczur, a person who sung better than most of the vocalists you could hear on the radio. The gentlemen, obsessed with her superb voice, could only choose someone who sung at least as well as she did, or better. God showed mercy one more time.

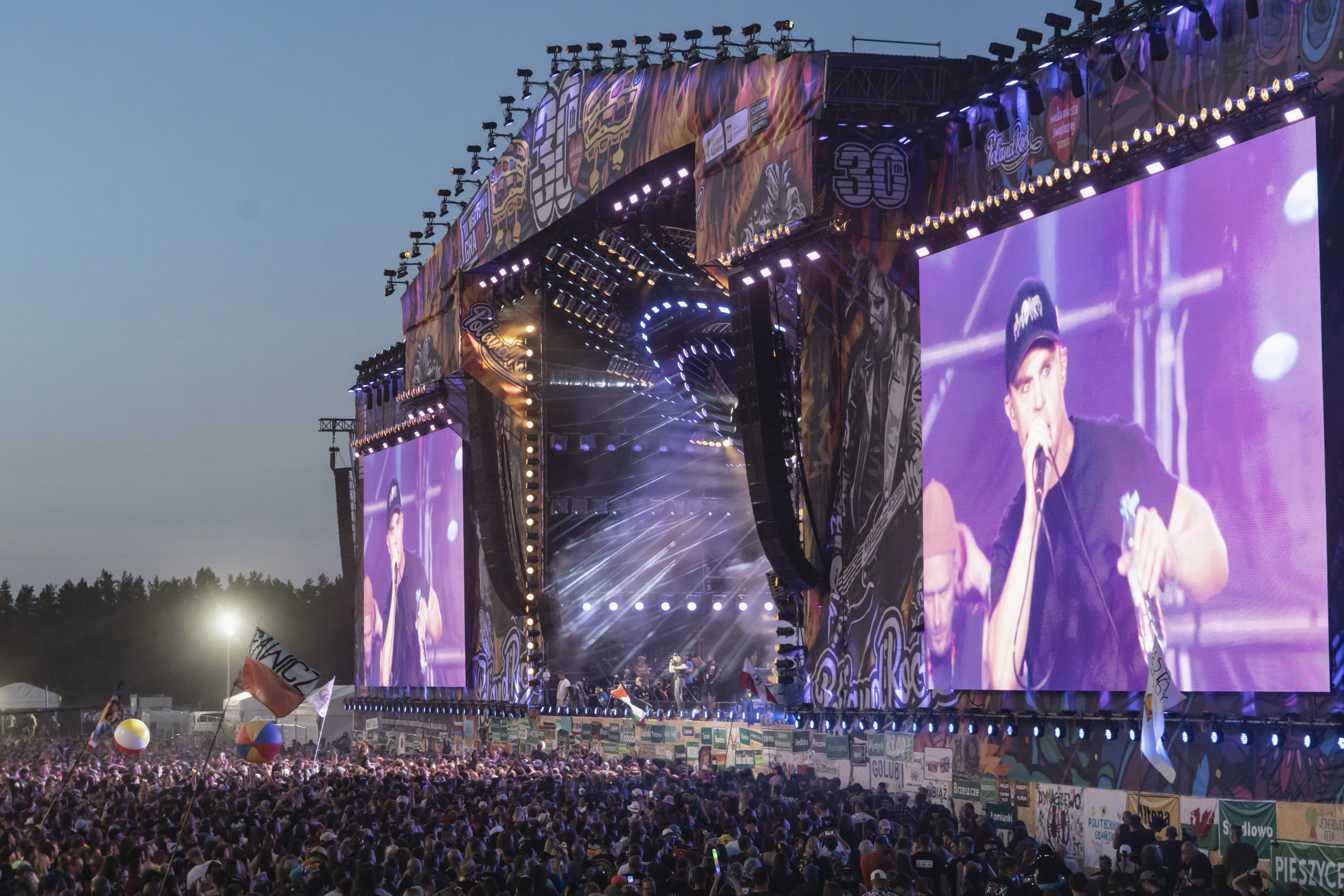
Coma - during the performance at the 30th Pol'and'Rock Festival in 2024

Matuszak, along with Witczak, apart from playing in Voo Doo Art performed with another band - De Ja Vi (guitar+bass+3 girls on vocals). De Ja Vi's rehearsals took place in the building owned by scout troop where one person, a scout, appeared very often. It was Piotr Rogucki. They were bound to meet. Our musicians thought that it would be worth trying to adopt the young talented vocalist. Here we skip the fact that these three gentlemen knew each other from technical college. Most probably it didn't occur to them then that they would ever play in one band. After the first rehearsal with Piotr, the choice proved to be the best possible. Long months of struggling with compositions followed. The guys drank many different alcoholic beverages that helped to tighten cooperation within the band. Everything seemed to be heading in a good direction. And suddenly, after years of plenty, a very unpleasant "situation" took place. As a result, Wojciech Grenda was dismissed from the band. Fortunately his replacement was found very quickly. Marcin Kobza joined the band. He was known in Łodź at that time as an excellent guitarist and played with groups such as Pig Bit or Second Hand. He fit in perfectly.

=== First Emergence from Darkness ===
Their first achievement was a single Skaczemy / Pasażer. In the end of 2003 they signed with BMG Poland which allowed them to record their first album Pierwsze wyjście z mroku (First Emergence from Darkness). The recording sessions started in November and lasted until January 2004. Even though it may sound unbelievable, all instruments were recorded between 12 and 18 November in Łodź and during the last three days of January in Gdańsk. A throat infection stopped Piotr from recording vocals until December. His sessions took place in Łódź and Gdańsk. Before the release of their first longplay album they gained popularity on supports with Kazik, T.Love, Sweet Noise and Acid Drinkers. People from the business also appreciated "Pierwsze Wyjście Z Mroku" awarding it with a Fryderyk statuette for Album of the Year - Rock.

=== The Wasted Forces of Great Army of Holy Seals ===
In 2005 during a break in the tour, the band started to work on some new material, which was later tried out live. On 29 May 2006 Coma released their second album Zaprzepaszczone siły wielkiej armii świętych znaków (The Wasted Forces of Great Army of Holy Seals). And as was the case with the first record, fans appreciated the album, awarding it with the title of Antyradio's Album of the Year. During the 13th Woodstock Festival the band received a Złoty Bączek statuette - awarded by the audience. The community of Polish musicians, music journalists and music critics once again honoured Coma with Fryderyk awards. That time the band won two of them for Album of the Year Rock/metal and Group of the Year.

On 13 June 2007 they gave a concert as a support for Linkin Park and Pearl Jam in Chorzów and on 12 August 2007 as a support for Tool and Dir En Grey during Metal Hammer Festival.

=== Hipertrofia ===
Later the same year, after a few years on tour the band decided to hide in the mountains, in a place called "Muzyczna Owczarnia" in Jaworki. There in the care of the wonderful family of the owner of the place, in the peaceful silence of the Pieniny Mountains they started to work on the material for their third album. When they returned to Łódź they continued polishing the material during rehearsals. In spring 2008 Adam Marszałkowski, known from another band from Łódź - Normalsi, took place of Tomasz Stasiak on drums and participated actively in the composition of new tracks. Between April and September 2008, all of the compositions were recorded, and they were released as Hipertrofia on 10 November 2008. The album soon gained the Platinum Record status and the band went on tour again.

== Members ==
- Piotr Rogucki – vocals (1998–2019, 2024-)
- Rafał Matuszak – bass guitar (1998–2019, 2024-)
- Dominik Witczak – guitar (1998–2019, 2024-)
- Marcin Kobza – guitar (2001–2019, 2024-)
- Adam Marszałkowski – drums (2008–2019, 2024-)
- Paweł Cieślak – keyboards (2017–2019, 2024-)

=== Former members ===
- Wojciech Grenda – guitar (1998–2001)
- Tomasz Stasiak – drums (1998–2008)

== Discography ==
=== Studio albums ===
Title	Details	Peak chart positions	Certifications
Title	Details	POL	Certifications
Pierwsze wyjście z mroku	Released: 17 May 2004; Label: BMG Poland; Formats: CD	7	
Zaprzepaszczone siły wielkiej armii świętych znaków	Released: 29 May 2006; Label: Sony BMG Poland; Formats: CD, digital download	1	POL: Gold
Hipertrofia	Released: 10 November 2008; Label: Sony BMG Poland; Formats: CD	1	POL: Platinum
Excess	Released: 11 October 2010; Label: Mystic Production; Formats: CD, digital download	12	
Untitled album	Released: 17 October 2011; Label: Mystic Production; Formats: CD, digital download	1	POL: Platinum
Don't Set Your Dogs on Me	Released: 8 February 2013; Label: Mystic Production; Formats: CD, digital download	6	
2005 YU55	Released: 7 October 2016; Label: Mystic Production; Formats: CD, digital download	3	
Sen o 7 szklankach	Released: 15 March 2019; Label: Mystic Production; Formats: CD, digital download	4	
"—" denotes a recording that did not chart or was not released in that territory.

=== Live albums ===
Title	Details	Peak chart positions	Certifications
Title	Details	POL	Certifications
Live	Released: 24 March 2010; Label: Mystic Production; Formats: CD, digital download	3	POL: Gold
Symfonicznie	Released: 1 October 2010; Label: Mystic Production; Formats: CD, digital download	5	POL: Gold
Przystanek Woodstock 2014	Released: 16 April 2015; Label: Złoty Melon	3	
"—" denotes a recording that did not chart or was not released in that territory.

=== Video albums ===
Title	Details	Certifications
Live	Released: 24 March 2010; Label: Mystic Production; Formats: DVD, Blu-ray	POL: Platinum

=== Singles ===
Title	Year	Album
"Skaczemy" / "Pasażer"	2000	Non-album single
"Leszek Żukowski"	2004	Pierwsze wyjście z mroku
"Spadam"	2004	Pierwsze wyjście z mroku
"Daleka droga do domu"	2006	Zaprzepaszczone siły wielkiej armii świętych znaków
"System"	2006	Zaprzepaszczone siły wielkiej armii świętych znaków
"Tonacja"	2006	Zaprzepaszczone siły wielkiej armii świętych znaków
"Zero osiem wojna"	2008	Hipertrofia
"Wola istnienia"	2009	Hipertrofia
"Transfuzja"	2009	Hipertrofia
"F.T.M.O. (Feel the Music's Over)"	2010	Excess
"Na Pół"	2011	Czerwony album
"Los cebula i krokodyle łzy"	2011	Czerwony album
