= List of Yngwie Malmsteen band members =

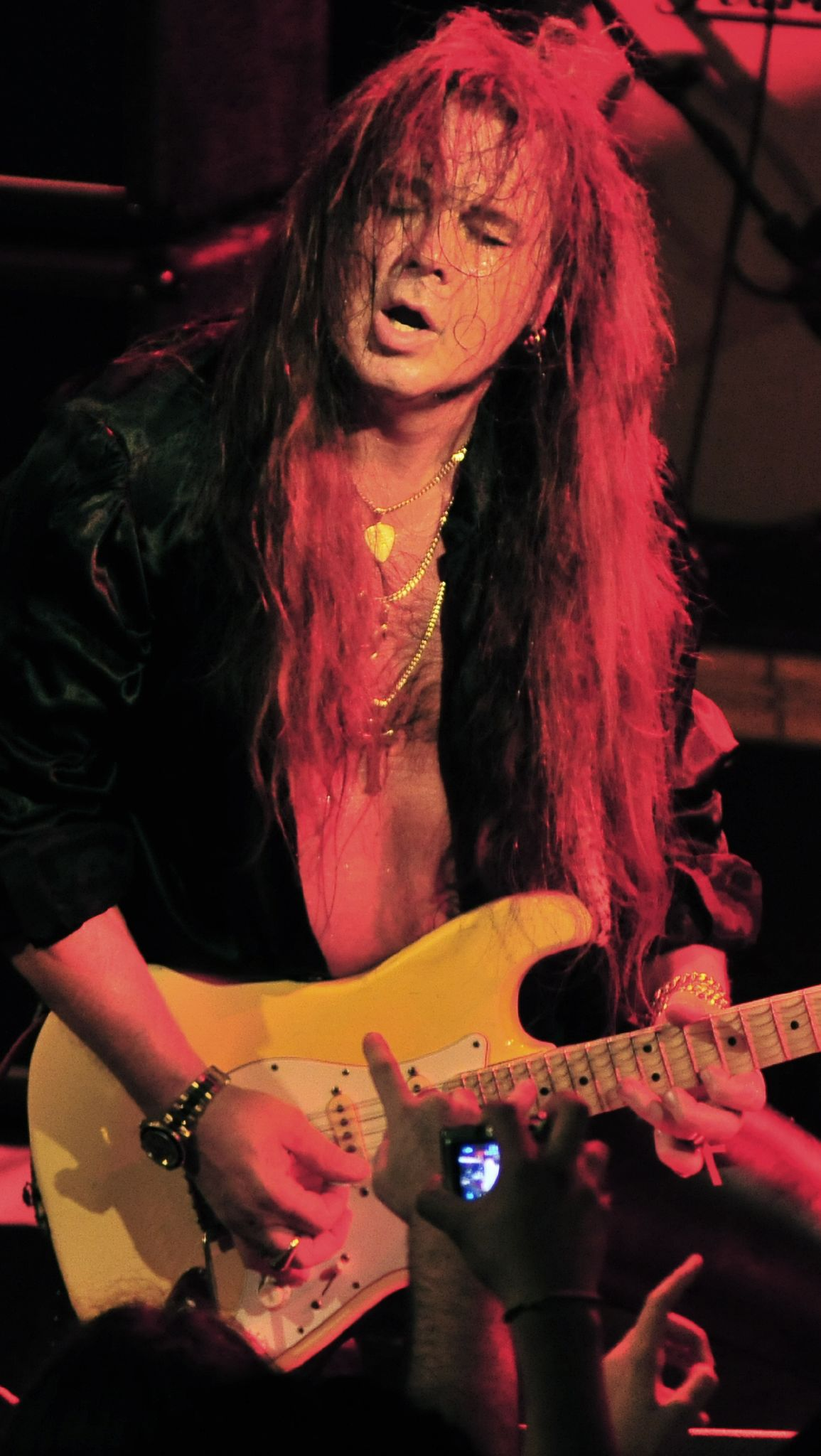
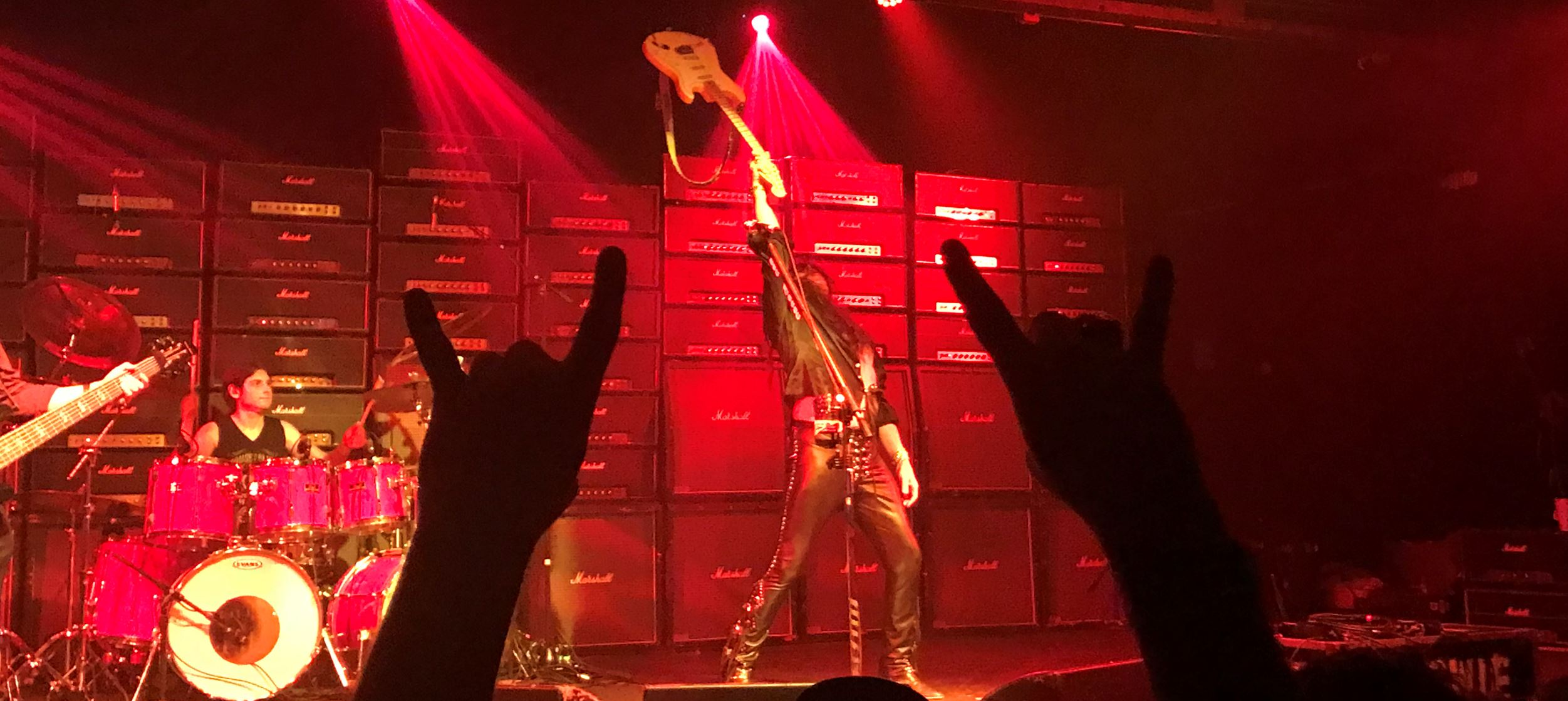
Malmsteen performing in 2008 and 2021.

Yngwie Malmsteen is a Swedish neoclassical metal musician. After tenures in the bands Steeler and Alcatrazz, he started his solo career in 1984 with the release of Rising Force, which was the name of his first band in 1978 featuring bassist Marcel Jacob and drummer Zepp Urgard. The original 1984 lineup of Malmsteen's band included vocalist Jeff Scott Soto, former Jethro Tull drummer Barriemore Barlow and keyboardist Jens Johansson, with Jacob added as the first touring bassist. The current lineup includes keyboardist Nick Marino (since 2011), bassist Emilio Martinez (since 2017) and drummer Kevin Klingenschmid (since 2023). Marino (live) and Malmsteen (studio) perform lead vocals.

== History ==
=== 1984–1995 ===
Malmsteen released his debut solo album Rising Force in 1984, which featured vocalist Jeff Scott Soto, keyboardist Jens Johansson and drummer Barriemore Barlow. Soto and Johansson remained for the next year's follow-up Marching Out, which was credited as a band effort under the name "Yngwie J. Malmsteen's Rising Force" and saw the addition of bassist Marcel Jacob and new drummer Anders Johansson (Jens' brother). Jacob left during the tour and was replaced by Wally Voss. Soto left in 1985 and was replaced by Mark Boals, who performed on the 1986 album Trilogy but was fired by Malmsteen before its release after an altercation. Soto returned for the album's tour, after which it was reported in 1987 that Mark Weitz would perform on the next album.

Weitz was soon replaced by Joe Lynn Turner, who performed on 1988's Odyssey together with session bassist Bob Daisley. The subsequent tour spawned Malmsteen's first live album Trial by Fire: Live in Leningrad, which featured bassist Barry Dunaway. When the tour ended, Turner left and eventually joined Deep Purple

Rehearsals started during the summer of 1989 with a returning Jeff Scott Soto on vocals, but the band's lineup changed dramatically when first Jens Johansson left to join Dio and then Anders Johansson also left "a few months" later, primarily due to frustration with the group's new management. Another version, by bassist Dunaway, has Yngwie firing him, Johansson and Soto on the spot after an incident at Miami club Button Sout in late summer 1989.

The Rising Force group was rebuilt as an all-Swedish lineup, with new vocalist Göran Edman, bassist Svante Henryson, drummer Michael Von Knorring and keyboardist Mats Olausson, all of whom contributed to 1990's Eclipse. Von Knorring left after a few shows for health reasons and was replaced by Pete Barnacle on tour, before Bo Werner of Mogg joined to record 1992's Fire & Ice.

=== 1992–2002 ===
During 1992 and 1993, Malmsteen took a break due to the death of his manager, being dropped by Elektra Records, and his wrongful arrest. He subsequently enlisted vocalist Michael Vescera, drummer Mike Terrana and bassist Barry Sparks to join Olausson in the Rising Force band. B.J. Zampa replaced Terrana during the tour for The Seventh Sign, before Shane Gaalaas took over later in the year. Following the promotion of Magnum Opus in 1995, Malmsteen went on a temporary hiatus. He returned the following year to release Inspiration, an album of cover versions featuring several former bandmates, including vocalists Soto, Boals and Turner. Boals returned for the album's tour – which also featured Dunaway and drummer Tommy Aldridge – before Mats Levén took over at the end of 1996.

Malmsteen enlisted Cozy Powell to perform drums on Facing the Animal in 1997. The drummer was also scheduled to play on the next tour, but was forced to pull out in March 1998 after suffering a foot injury in a "minor motorcycle accident". Powell later died in a car crash on 5 April. By 1999, the band included returning vocalist Boals and new drummer John Macaluso, with Alchemy released before the end of the year. Randy Coven took over from Dunaway for the album's touring cycle, although bass on 2000's War to End All Wars was performed by Malmsteen. By the time the album was released, however, Boals had left Malmsteen's band again. Jørn Lande took his place, on the recommendation of his Ark bandmate Macaluso.

Lande only remained with Malmsteen until 8 April 2001, when he was involved in a backstage altercation which led to his departure. Out of "loyalty" to his Ark bandmate, Macaluso also left the band following the event. After it was initially reported that Soto would return to take over on vocals, the spot was later filled by Boals. It was also initially reported that Metal Symphony of Darkness drummer Ed Rock would replace Macaluso, although this was quickly altered to be Cherry Poppin' Daddies drummer Tim Donahue. After the conclusion of the tour, Malmsteen introduced a brand new lineup of his band: vocalist Doogie White, keyboardist Derek Sherinian, drummer Patrick Johansson and touring bassist Mick Cervino. Attack!! was recorded and released as this lineup's only album the following year.

=== 2002 onwards ===
Touring for Attack!! began in December 2002 and featured Joakim Svalberg on keyboards. Rudy Sarzo replaced Cervino in February 2004, although by April he had left to join Dio's touring lineup. Cervino returned to the band for the tour in promotion of 2005's Unleash the Fury. Nick Z. Marino replaced Svalberg for a run of shows later in the year, before Sherinian returned for US tour dates in 2006. In February 2008, it was announced that White had parted ways with Malmsteen due to musical differences. His replacement was quickly confirmed to be former Judas Priest and Iced Earth frontman Tim "Ripper" Owens. Michael Troy and Bjorn Englen were subsequently announced as the replacements for Sherinian and Cervino, respectively. Marino rejoined the band in 2009, and in 2012 Englen was replaced by Ralph Ciavolino. Leading up to the release of Spellbound, rumors began to circulate that Owens had left the band. This was later confirmed by the singer, who was not featured on the album.

Owens was not replaced – Malmsteen and Marino have handled lead vocal duties since his departure. In 2015, Johansson left to join W.A.S.P. Mark Ellis took his place and performed on Malmsteen's next studio album, World on Fire. By 2018, Ellis had been replaced by Brian Wilson, who was replaced in 2023 by Kevin Klingenschmid.

== Members ==
=== Current ===
Image	Name	Years active	Instruments	Release contributions
	Yngwie Malmsteen	1984–present	guitars; backing vocals; bass guitar and keyboards (studio); Moog Taurus; lead vocals (since 2012, studio only; occasionally beforehand)	all Yngwie Malmsteen releases
	Nick Z. Marino	2005 (touring); 2009–present (touring and occasional studio appearances)	keyboards; lead vocals (since 2012, live only)	Relentless (2010); Spellbound Live in Tampa (2014); World on Fire (2016)
	Emilio Martinez	2017–present (touring only)	bass guitar; backing vocals	Tokyo Live (2025)
	Kevin Klingenschmid	2023–present (touring only)	drums	''Tokyo Live'' (2025)

=== Former ===
Image	Name	Years active	Instruments	Release contributions
	Jens Johansson	1984–1989	keyboards	all Yngwie Malmsteen releases from Rising Force (1984) to Trial by Fire: Live in Leningrad (1989); Inspiration (1996)
	Jeff Scott Soto	1984–1985; 1986–1987; 1996–1997	lead vocals	Rising Force (1984); Marching Out (1985); Inspiration (1996)
	Barriemore Barlow	1984	drums	Rising Force (1984)
	Anders Johansson	1984–1989	drums	all Yngwie Malmsteen releases from Marching Out (1985) to Trial by Fire: Live in Leningrad (1989); Inspiration (1996)
	Marcel Jacob	1984–1985 (died 2009)	bass guitar	Marching Out (1985); Inspiration (1996)
	Wally Voss	1985–1987 (touring only) (died 1992)	bass guitar	none
	Mark Boals	1985–1986; 1996 (touring); 1999–2000; 2001 (touring)	lead vocals	Trilogy (1986); Inspiration (1996); Alchemy (1999); War to End All Wars (2000); Live in Korea (2009)
	Mark Weitz	1987	lead vocals	none
	Joe Lynn Turner	1987–1989	lead vocals	Odyssey (1988); Trial by Fire: Live in Leningrad (1989); Inspiration (1996)
	Barry Dunaway	1987–1989; 1992 (touring only, after Svante Henryson's departure); 1996–1999	bass guitar; backing vocals	Trial by Fire: Live in Leningrad (1989); Facing the Animal (1997); Double Live! (1998); Alchemy (1999)
	Mats Olausson	1989–2001 (died 2015)	keyboards; backing vocals	all Yngwie Malmsteen releases from Eclipse (1990) to War to End All Wars (2000), except Concerto Suite for Electric Guitar and Orchestra in E Flat Minor Op.1 (1998); Live in Korea (2009)
	Göran Edman	1989–1992	lead vocals	Eclipse (1990); Fire & Ice (1992)
	Svante Henryson	1989–1992	bass guitar; backing vocals; cello	Eclipse (1990); Fire & Ice (1992)
	Michael Von Knorring	1989–1990	drums	Eclipse (1990); Fire & Ice (1992) – one track only
	Pete Barnacle	1990 (touring only, after Michael Von Knorring's departure when he got sick)	drums	none
	Bo Werner	1990–1992 (touring only Japan leg, after Pete Barnacle's departure when the European leg ended)	drums; backing vocals	Fire & Ice (1992)
	Michael Vescera	1993–1996	lead vocals	The Seventh Sign (1994); I Can't Wait (1994); Magnum Opus (1995)
	Barry Sparks	1993–1996	bass guitar; backing vocals	I Can't Wait (1994); Magnum Opus (1995)
	Mike Terrana	1993–1994	drums; backing vocals	The Seventh Sign (1994); I Can't Wait (1994)
	B.J. Zampa	1994 (touring only, after Mike Terrana's departure)	drums	none
	Shane Gaalaas	1994–1996	drums	Magnum Opus (1995)
	Tommy Aldridge	1996 (touring only)	drums	
	Mats Levén	1996–1999	lead vocals	Facing the Animal (1997); Double Live! (1998)
	Cozy Powell	1997–1998 (until his death)	drums	Facing the Animal (1997)
	John Macaluso	1999–2001	drums	Alchemy (1999); War to End All Wars (2000)
	Randy Coven	1999–2001 (touring only) (died 2014)	bass	Live in Korea (2009)
	Jørn Lande	2000–2001 (touring only)	lead vocals	none
	Tim Donahue	2001 (touring only)	drums	Live in Korea (2009)
	Patrick Johansson	2001–2015	drums	Attack!! (2002); G3: Rockin' in the Free World (2004); Unleash the Fury (2005); Perpetual Flame (2008); Relentless (2010); Spellbound Live in Tampa (2014)
	Doogie White	2001–2008	lead vocals	Attack!! (2002); Unleash the Fury (2005)
	Mick Cervino	2001–2004; 2005–2007 (touring only)	bass guitar	G3: Rockin' in the Free World (2004)
	Derek Sherinian	2001–2002; 2006–2007	keyboards	Attack!! (2002); Perpetual Flame (2008)
	Joakim Svalberg	2002–2005	keyboards	G3: Rockin' in the Free World (2004); Unleash the Fury (2005)
	Rudy Sarzo	2004 (touring only)	bass guitar	none
	Tim "Ripper" Owens	2008–2012	lead vocals	Perpetual Flame (2008); Relentless (2010)
	Michael Troy	2007–2009	keyboards	Angels of Love (2009)
	Bjorn Englen	2008–2012 (touring only)	bass guitar	none
	Ralph Ciavolino	2012–2017 (touring only)	bass guitar; backing vocals	Spellbound Live in Tampa (2014)
	Mark Ellis	2015–2018	drums	World on Fire (2016)
	Brian Wilson	2018–2023 (touring only)	drums	none
	Wyatt Cooper	2024-2025 (touring only)	drums	

== Timelines ==
=== Recording ===
Album	Guitar	Vocals	Keyboards	Bass	Drums
Rising Force (1984)	Yngwie Malmsteen	Jeff Scott Soto	Jens Johansson	Yngwie Malmsteen	Barriemore Barlow
Marching Out (1985)	Yngwie Malmsteen	Jeff Scott Soto	Jens Johansson	Marcel Jacob	Anders Johansson
Trilogy (1986)	Yngwie Malmsteen	Mark Boals	Jens Johansson	Yngwie Malmsteen	Anders Johansson
Odyssey (1988)	Yngwie Malmsteen	Joe Lynn Turner	Jens Johansson	Yngwie Malmsteen; Bob Daisley	Anders Johansson
Eclipse (1990)	Yngwie Malmsteen	Göran Edman	Mats Olausson	Svante Henryson	Michael Von Knorring
Fire & Ice (1992)	Yngwie Malmsteen	Göran Edman	Mats Olausson	Svante Henryson	Michael Von Knorring; Bo Werner
The Seventh Sign (1994)	Yngwie Malmsteen	Michael Vescera	Mats Olausson	Yngwie Malmsteen	Mike Terrana
I Can't Wait (1994)	Yngwie Malmsteen	Michael Vescera	Mats Olausson	Barry Sparks	Mike Terrana
Magnum Opus (1995)	Yngwie Malmsteen	Michael Vescera	Mats Olausson	Barry Sparks	Shane Gaalaas
Inspiration (1996)	Yngwie Malmsteen	Jeff Scott Soto; Joe Lynn Turner; Mark Boals	David Rosenthal; Mats Olausson; Jens Johansson	Yngwie Malmsteen; Marcel Jacob	Anders Johansson
Facing the Animal (1997)	Yngwie Malmsteen	Mats Levén	Mats Olausson	Yngwie Malmsteen; Barry Dunaway	Cozy Powell
Concerto Suite for Electric Guitar and Orchestra (1998)	Yngwie Malmsteen	none			
Alchemy (1999)	Yngwie Malmsteen	Mark Boals	Mats Olausson	Yngwie Malmsteen; Barry Dunaway	John Macaluso
War to End All Wars (2000)	Yngwie Malmsteen	Mark Boals	Mats Olausson	Yngwie Malmsteen	John Macaluso
Attack! (2002)	Yngwie Malmsteen	Doogie White	Derek Sherinian	Yngwie Malmsteen	Patrick Johansson
Unleash the Fury (2005)	Yngwie Malmsteen	Doogie White	Joakim Svalberg	Yngwie Malmsteen	Patrick Johansson
Perpetual Flame (2008)	Yngwie Malmsteen	Tim "Ripper" Owens	Derek Sherinian	Yngwie Malmsteen	Patrick Johansson
Angels of Love (2009)	Yngwie Malmsteen	none	Michael Troy	Yngwie Malmsteen	none
Relentless (2010)	Yngwie Malmsteen	Tim "Ripper" Owens	Nick Marino	Yngwie Malmsteen	Patrick Johansson
Spellbound (2012)	Yngwie Malmsteen	Yngwie Malmsteen		Yngwie Malmsteen	Yngwie Malmsteen
World on Fire (2016)	Yngwie Malmsteen	Yngwie Malmsteen		Yngwie Malmsteen	Mark Ellis
Blue Lightning (2019)	Yngwie Malmsteen	Yngwie Malmsteen		Yngwie Malmsteen	Lawrence Lannerbach (a.k.a. drum machine programmed by Yngwie himself)
Parabellum (2021)	Yngwie Malmsteen	Yngwie Malmsteen		Yngwie Malmsteen	Lawrence Lannerbach (a.k.a. drum machine programmed by Yngwie himself)
Tokyo Live (2025)	Yngwie Malmsteen	Yngwie Malmsteen; Nick Marino	Nick Marino	Emilio Martinez	Kevin Klingenschmid
Hell or High Water (2026)	Yngwie Malmsteen	Yngwie Malmsteen			Jay Lannerbach (a.k.a. drum machine programmed by Yngwie himself)

== Lineups ==
Period	Members	Releases
Early 1984	Yngwie Malmsteen – guitars, bass guitar; Jeff Scott Soto – lead vocals; Jens Johansson – keyboards; Barriemore Barlow – drums	Rising Force (1984)
1984–1985	Yngwie Malmsteen – guitars, backing vocals; Jeff Scott Soto – lead vocals; Jens Johansson – keyboards; Marcel Jacob – bass guitar; Anders Johansson – drums	Marching Out (1985); Live '85 (1985); Inspiration (1996) – some tracks
1985–1986	Yngwie Malmsteen – guitars, bass (studio); Mark Boals – lead vocals; Jens Johansson – keyboards; Wally Voss – bass guitar (touring only); Anders Johansson – drums	Trilogy (1986); Inspiration (1996) – some tracks
1986–1987	Yngwie Malmsteen – guitars; Jeff Scott Soto – lead vocals; Jens Johansson – keyboards; Wally Voss – bass guitar (touring only); Anders Johansson – drums	none
1987	Yngwie Malmsteen – guitars; Mark Weitz – lead vocals; Jens Johansson – keyboards; Wally Voss – bass guitar (touring only); Anders Johansson – drums	none
1987	Yngwie Malmsteen – guitars, bass (studio); Joe Lynn Turner – lead vocals; Jens Johansson – keyboards; Wally Voss – bass guitar (touring only); Anders Johansson – drums; with: Bob Daisley – bass (studio only)	Odyssey (1988); Inspiration (1996) – some tracks
1987–1989	Yngwie Malmsteen – guitars, backing and lead vocals; Joe Lynn Turner – lead and backing vocals; Jens Johansson – keyboards; Barry Dunaway – bass guitar, backing vocals; Anders Johansson – drums	Trial by Fire: Live in Leningrad (1989)
1989–1990	Yngwie Malmsteen – guitars, backing vocals; Göran Edman – lead vocals; Mats Olausson – keyboards, backing vocals; Svante Henryson – bass guitar, backing vocals; Michael Von Knorring – drums	Eclipse (1990); Fire & Ice (1992) – one track only; Inspiration (1996) – some tracks, without Henryson and Von Knorring
1990	Yngwie Malmsteen – guitars; Göran Edman – lead vocals; Mats Olausson – keyboards, backing vocals; Svante Henryson – bass guitar, backing vocals; Pete Barnacle – drums (touring only)	none
1990–1992	Yngwie Malmsteen – guitars, backing vocals; Göran Edman – lead vocals; Mats Olausson – keyboards, backing vocals; Svante Henryson – bass guitar, backing vocals; Bo Werner – drums	Fire & Ice (1992)
Malmsteen on hiatus 1992–1993
1993–1994	Yngwie Malmsteen – guitars, bass (studio), vocals; Michael Vescera – lead vocals; Mats Olausson – keyboards, backing vocals; Barry Sparks – bass guitar, backing vocals (touring only); Mike Terrana – drums, backing vocals	The Seventh Sign (1994); I Can't Wait (1994)
1994	Yngwie Malmsteen – guitars; Michael Vescera – lead vocals; Mats Olausson – keyboards, backing vocals; Barry Sparks – bass guitar, backing vocals (touring only); B.J. Zampa – drums (touring only)	none
1994–1996	Yngwie Malmsteen – guitars, backing vocals; Michael Vescera – lead vocals; Mats Olausson – keyboards, backing vocals; Barry Sparks – bass guitar, backing vocals; Shane Gaalaas – drums	Magnum Opus (1995)
1996	Yngwie Malmsteen – guitars; Mark Boals – lead vocals; Mats Olausson – keyboards, backing vocals; Barry Dunaway – bass guitar; Tommy Aldridge – drums (touring only)	none
1996–1997	Yngwie Malmsteen – guitars; Mats Levén – lead vocals; Mats Olausson – keyboards, backing vocals; Barry Dunaway – bass guitar	none
1997–1998	Yngwie Malmsteen – guitars, backing vocals, bass (studio); Mats Levén – lead vocals; Mats Olausson – keyboards, backing vocals; Barry Dunaway – bass guitar; Cozy Powell – drums	Facing the Animal (1997)
1998	Yngwie Malmsteen – guitars; Mats Levén – lead vocals; Mats Olausson – keyboards, backing vocals; Barry Dunaway – bass guitar	Double Live! (1998)
1999	Yngwie Malmsteen – guitars, vocals, bass (studio); Mark Boals – lead vocals; Mats Olausson – keyboards, backing vocals; Barry Dunaway – bass guitar; John Macaluso – drums	Alchemy (1999)
1999–2000	Yngwie Malmsteen – guitars, vocals, bass (studio); Mark Boals – lead vocals; Mats Olausson – keyboards, backing vocals; Randy Coven – bass guitar (touring only); John Macaluso – drums	War to End All Wars (2000)
2000–2001	Yngwie Malmsteen – guitars; Jørn Lande – lead vocals; Mats Olausson – keyboards, backing vocals; Randy Coven – bass guitar (touring only); John Macaluso – drums	none
2001	Yngwie Malmsteen – guitars; Mark Boals – lead vocals; Mats Olausson – keyboards, backing vocals; Randy Coven – bass guitar (touring only); Tim Donahue – drums (touring only)	Live in Korea (2009)
2001–2002	Yngwie Malmsteen – guitars, vocals. bass (studio); Doogie White – lead vocals; Derek Sherinian – keyboards; Mick Cervino – bass guitar (touring only); Patrick Johansson – drums	Attack!! (2002)
2002–2004	Yngwie Malmsteen – guitar; Doogie White – lead vocals; Joakim Svalberg – keyboards; Mick Cervino – bass guitar (touring only); Patrick Johansson – drums	G3: Rockin' in the Free World (2004) – without White
February — April 2004	Yngwie Malmsteen – guitars; Doogie White – lead vocals; Joakim Svalberg – keyboards; Rudy Sarzo – bass guitar (touring only); Patrick Johansson – drums	none
2004–2005	Yngwie Malmsteen – guitars, bass guitar, vocals, keyboards (studio); Doogie White – lead vocals; Joakim Svalberg – keyboards; Patrick Johansson – drums	Unleash the Fury (2005)
2005	Yngwie Malmsteen – guitars; Doogie White – lead vocals; Joakim Svalberg – keyboards; Mick Cervino – bass guitar (touring only); Patrick Johansson – drums	none
2005	Yngwie Malmsteen – guitars; Doogie White – lead vocals; Nick Z. Marino – keyboards (touring only); Mick Cervino – bass guitar (touring only); Patrick Johansson – drums	none
2006–2007	Yngwie Malmsteen – guitars, vocals, bass and keyboards (studio); Doogie White – lead vocals; Derek Sherinian – keyboards; Mick Cervino – bass guitar (touring only); Patrick Johansson – drums	Perpetual Flame (2008) – all except vocals
2008–2009	Yngwie Malmsteen – guitars, vocals, bass and keyboards (studio); Tim "Ripper" Owens – lead vocals; Michael Troy – keyboards; Bjorn Englen – bass guitar (touring only); Patrick Johansson – drums	Perpetual Flame (2008) – vocals only; Angels of Love (2009) – Malmsteen and Troy only
2009–2012	Yngwie Malmsteen – guitars, vocals, bass, drums and keyboards (studio); Tim "Ripper" Owens – lead vocals; Nick Z. Marino – keyboards; Bjorn Englen – bass guitar (touring only); Patrick Johansson – drums	Relentless (2010); Spellbound (2012) – Malmsteen only
2012	Yngwie Malmsteen – guitars; Tim "Ripper" Owens – lead vocals; Nick Z. Marino – keyboards; Ralph Ciavolino – bass guitar, backing vocals (touring only); Patrick Johansson – drums	none
2012–2015	Yngwie Malmsteen – guitars, lead vocals (studio); Nick Z. Marino – keyboards, lead vocals (live); Ralph Ciavolino – bass guitar, backing vocals (touring only); Patrick Johansson – drums	Spellbound Live in Tampa (2014)
2015–2017	Yngwie Malmsteen – guitars, vocals, bass and keyboards (studio); Nick Z. Marino – keyboards, lead vocals (live); Ralph Ciavolino – bass guitar, backing vocals (touring only); Mark Ellis – drums	World on Fire (2016)
2017–2018	Yngwie Malmsteen – guitars, lead vocals (studio); Nick Z. Marino – keyboards, lead vocals (live); Emilio Martinez – bass guitar, backing vocals (touring only); Mark Ellis – drums	en only
2018–2023	Yngwie Malmsteen – guitars, vocals, bass, keyboards and drum machine (studio); Nick Z. Marino – keyboards, lead vocals (live); Emilio Martinez – bass guitar, backing vocals (touring only); Brian Wilson – drums (touring only)	Blue Lightning (2019) – Malmsteen only; Parabellum (2021) – Malmsteen only
2023–2024	Yngwie Malmsteen – guitars, vocals, bass, keyboards and drum machine (studio); Nick Z. Marino – keyboards, lead vocals (live); Emilio Martinez – bass guitar, backing vocals (touring only); Kevin Klingenschmid– drums	Tokyo Live (2025)
2024–present	Yngwie Malmsteen – guitars, vocals, bass, keyboards and drum machine (studio); Nick Z. Marino – keyboards, lead vocals (live); Emilio Martinez – bass guitar, backing vocals (touring only); Wyatt Cooper – drums (touring only)	
