= Generation Axe =

American rock band

- Genres: Rock, heavy metal
- Years active: 2016–present
- Members: Tosin Abasi; Nuno Bettencourt; Yngwie Malmsteen; Steve Vai; Zakk Wylde
- Website: web.archive.org/web/20221205153130/http://generationaxe.com/

Generation Axe are an international rock/heavy metal supergroup formed by Steve Vai in 2016. They toured North America in April and May 2016, and Asia in April 2017. Another North American tour took place in November and December 2018, and another short Asian tour in November 2019.

== Members ==
=== Guitarists ===
- Steve Vai
- Zakk Wylde (Black Label Society, Ozzy Osbourne, Pride & Glory, Pantera)
- Yngwie Malmsteen
- Nuno Bettencourt (Extreme)
- Tosin Abasi (Animals as Leaders)

=== Backing band ===
- Bass – Pete Griffin (Dweezil Zappa, Dethklok Stanley Clarke, Edgar Winter)
- Keyboards – Nick Marinovich (aka Nick Z. Marino) (Yngwie Malmsteen) (2016, 2018-2019); Derek Sherinian (ex-Dream Theater, Sons of Apollo) (2017)
- Drums – JP Bouvet (Dave MacKay, Drew of the Drew); Matt Garstka (Animals As Leaders) (2016)

== Tour dates ==
=== North America (2016) ===
Date	City	Venue
04/05/16	Seattle, WA	Paramount Theater
04/06/16	Vancouver, BC	Queen Elizabeth Theatre
04/08/16	Oakland, CA	Fox Theater
04/09/16	Las Vegas, NV	The Joint
04/10/16	San Diego, CA	Humphrey's Concerts By The Bay
04/11/16	Los Angeles, CA	The Wiltern
04/13/16	Denver, CO	Paramount Theater
04/15/16	Kansas City, MO	Uptown Theater
04/16/16	Salina, KS	The Stiefel Theater
04/17/16	Dallas, TX	Bomb Factory
04/18/16	Houston, TX	Revention Music Center (Note: Cancelled due to risk of flooding.)
04/20/16	Jacksonville, FL	Florida Theater
04/21/16	Orlando, FL	Hard Rock Live
04/23/16	Wilmington, NC	Cape Fear Community College
04/24/16	Washington, DC	Warner Theater
04/25/16	Cincinnati, OH	Taft Theater
04/26/16	Indianapolis, IN	Murat Theater @ Old National Center
04/27/16	Nashville, TN	Ryman Auditorium
04/29/16	Chicago, IL	Copernicus Center
05/01/16	Madison, WI	Orpheum Theater
05/02/16	Royal Oak, MI	Royal Oak Music Theater
05/04/16	Toronto, ON	Massey Hall
05/05/16	Upper Darby, PA	Tower Theater
05/06/16	Westbury, NY	Theater at Westbury
05/07/16	Hampton Beach, NH	Hampton Beach Casino Ballroom
05/08/16	Providence, RI	Providence PAC
05/09/16	Red Bank, NJ	Count Basie Theater

=== Asia (2017) ===
Date	City	Venue
04/03/17	Nagoya, Japan	Zepp Nagoya
04/04/17	Osaka, Japan	ZEPP Namba
04/06/17	Tokyo, Japan	ZEPP Tokyo
04/07/17	Tokyo, Japan	ZEPP Tokyo
04/09/17	Seoul, South Korea	Blue Square Samsung Card Hall
04/12/17	Hong Kong	Star Hall
04/14/17	Taipei City, Taiwan	National Taiwan University Sports Center
04/18/17	Beijing, China	Le Sports Center
04/21/17	Jakarta, Indonesia	Eco Park Ancol
04/23/17	Bangkok, Thailand	Moonstar Studio 8
04/25/17	Singapore	Hard Rock Hotel Singapore

=== North America (2018) ===
Date	City	Venue
11/07/18	Oakland, CA	Fox Theater
11/08/18	Anaheim, CA	City National Grove of Anaheim
11/09/18	Las Vegas, NV	The Joint
11/10/18	Tempe, AZ	Marquee Theatre
11/11/18	Albuquerque, NM	El Rey Theater
11/13/18	Denver, CO	Paramount Theater
11/15/18	Kansas City, MO	Uptown Theater
11/16/18	Salina, KS	Stiefel Theatre
11/17/18	Tulsa, OK	Brady Theater
11/18/18	Des Moines, IA	Hoyt Sherman Theatre
11/19/18	Cincinnati, OH	Taft Theatre
11/20/18	Grand Rapids, MI	20 Monroe Live
11/21/18	Detroit, MI	The Filmore
11/23/18	Medford, MA	Chevalier Theatre
11/24/18	Niagara Falls, NY	The Rapids Theatre
11/25/18	Kitchener, ON	Centre in the Square
11/27/18	Bethlehem, PA	Sands Event Center
11/28/18	Port Chester, NY	Capitol Theatre
11/29/18	Albany, NY	The Palace Theatre
11/30/18	Atlantic City, NJ	Hard Rock Hotel & Casino
12/01/18	Rochester, NY	Kodak Center for the Arts
12/03/18	Greensburg, PA	The Palace Theatre
12/04/18	Westbury, NY	NYCB Theatre at Westbury
12/05/18	Richmond, VA	The National
12/08/18	Atlanta, GA	Tabernacle
12/09/18	Orlando, FL	Hard Rock Live
12/10/18	Hollywood, FL	Hard Rock Event Center
12/11/18	Clearwater, FL	Ruth Eckerd Hall
12/13/18	Austin, TX	ACL Live at the Moody Theater
12/14/18	Dallas, TX	The Bomb Factory
12/16/18	Salt Lake City, UT	Rockwell @ The Complex
12/18/18	Los Angeles, CA	The Wiltern

=== Asia (2019) ===
Date	City	Venue
11/23/19	Seoul, South Korea	Yes24 Live Hall
11/25/19	Fukuoka, Japan	ZEPP Fukuoka
11/26/19	Osaka, Japan	ZEPP Osaka
11/28/19	Nagoya, Japan	ZEPP Nagoya
11/29/19	Tokyo, Japan	Toyosu Pit

== Setlist ==
Performer(s)	Song
Abasi, Bettencourt, Malmsteen, Vai, Wylde	Foreplay (Boston) (2016-2017); Hocus Pocus (Focus) (2018-2019)
Abasi	Tempting Time; Air Chrysalis (2016-2017); The Woven Web; CAFO (2018-2019)
Abasi, Bettencourt	Physical Education
Bettencourt	Get the Funk Out; Midnight Express; A Side of Mash Extreme solos medley (Note: At the April 21 show in Orlando, Bettencourt also included a performance of Purple Rain in tribute to Prince, who died earlier that day.)
Bettencourt, Wylde	Sideways (Citizen Cope)
Wylde	N.I.B. (Black Sabbath); Whipping Post (The Allman Brothers Band) (2016-2017); Little Wing (Jimi Hendrix) (2016-2017, occasional appearances from Malmsteen); I'm Broken (Pantera) (2018-2019); Into The Void (Black Sabbath) (2018-2019); War Pigs (Black Sabbath) (2018-2019)
Wylde, Bettencourt, Vai	Still Got The Blues (Gary Moore) (2018-2019)
Vai	Now We Run (2016); Bad Horsie (2017); Racing The World (2016-2017); Tender Surrender (2016-2017); Gravity Storm (2016-2017); There's A Fire In The House (2018-2019); The Animal (2018-2019); For The Love Of God (2018-2019)
Vai, Abasi	Building the Church (2016)
Malmsteen	Spellbound (2016-2017); Top Down, Foot Down (2018-2019); No Rest For The Wicked (2018-2019); Into Valhalla; Baroque & Roll; Overture; From A Thousand Cuts (2016-2017); Arpeggios From Hell; Echo Etude; Soldier (2017-2019); Badinerie (J.S. Bach); Icarus' Dream Suite Op. 4 Far Beyond the Sun; The Star-Spangled Banner (US shows); Trilogy Suite Op. 5
Malmsteen, Vai	Black Star
Vai, Abasi, Bettencourt, Wylde	Frankenstein (Edgar Winter)
Abasi, Bettencourt, Malmsteen, Vai, Wylde	Bohemian Rhapsody (Queen) (2018-2019); Highway Star (Deep Purple) (2016-2017); Burn (Deep Purple) (2018-2019)

== Discography ==
- Generation Axe — The Guitars That Destroyed the World: Live In China (2019)
