= Perspective of Spiritism on Jesus =

For Spiritism, Jesus is the most perfect model of a human being that God has offered to serve as a guide. In this sense, Allan Kardec states that, "for humankind, Jesus constitutes the type of moral perfection that Humanity can aspire to on Earth. God offers him to us as the most perfect model, and the doctrine he taught is the purest expression of the Lord's law because, being the most spiritually pure of all those who have appeared on Earth, he was animated by the Divine Spirit".

According to Spiritist doctrine, Jesus came with the divine mission to fulfill the law previously revealed by Moses (with Moses representing the first revelation and Jesus the second). However, Jesus did not reveal everything; often he only unveiled the "germ of truth", which was completed by the "third revelation": Spiritism. The medium Francisco Cândido Xavier, in the work Emmanuel, sums it up: "Jesus was the manifestation of God's love, the personification of His infinite goodness".

== Corporeal Nature of Jesus ==
However, a deep division arose within the Brazilian Spiritist movement regarding the corporeal nature of Jesus, bringing into conflict the ideas of Kardec and those defended by Jean-Baptiste Roustaing, his contemporary, who argued that Christ had a body different from others, of a fluidic nature (docetism). This point was refuted by Kardec himself in an article from 1866. However, the obligation to study Roustaing's work is indicated in the bylaws of the Brazilian Spiritist Federation, and an attempt to remove this requirement was contested in court.

Kardec mentions the issue in The Genesis, stating that he would not address it at that time: "Without pre-judging the nature of Christ, a subject that is beyond the scope of this work, considering him merely a superior Spirit...".

The examination of the nature of Christ, in fact, only became public after his death in the work that gathers his writings published in the Revista Espírita and other unpublished works – Posthumous Works. There, Kardec is categorical: discussions about the corporeal nature of Christ were the cause of major schisms within the Church, and in the chapter "Study on the Nature of Christ", he refutes all the foundations of the Church for the dogma of Jesus' divinity, which is why the belief in the "Trinity" has no basis in Spiritism.

== Jesus and mediumship ==
Emphasizing that, given the mission he fulfilled, Jesus was a direct messenger of God, more than a prophet, and that "as a man, he had the organization of carnal beings; however, as a pure Spirit, detached from matter, he had to live more from the spiritual life than from the physical life". Jesus did not act as a "medium", acting on his own and by his own personal power – except in moments when he acted as an intermediary of God's power.
