= High Impact =

High Impact may refer to:

- High Impact (album), a 2009 album by Yngwie Malmsteen
- High Impact Games, videogame company
