= Birth of the Sun =

2002 compilation album by Rising Force

Compilation album by Rising Force
- Released: 10 September 2002
- Recorded: 1980
- Genre: Neo-classical metal
- Length: 48:25
- Label: Powerline Records
- Producer: Marcel Jacob

Birth of the Sun is a 2002 compilation album credited to Rising Force, released on the Powerline Records label (catalog PLRCD006). It consists of recordings made by Yngwie Malmsteen and his band in 1980, remixed and remastered by bassist Marcel Jacob.

== Background ==
The recordings date from 1980, when Malmsteen, Jacob, and drummer Zepp Urgard were performing together in Sweden before Malmsteen's move to the United States. In a 1984 interview, Malmsteen stated that the band "never officially recorded commercially" during this period. Jacob's family financed the sessions, and the tapes remained unreleased for over two decades until Jacob remixed and remastered them for Powerline Records in 2002.

== Dispute ==
The release was disputed by Malmsteen's management, who described it as an unauthorized collection of "old rehearsal tapes" released "without Yngwie's knowledge or permission." Powerline Records responded that the sessions had been financed by Jacob's family and that Jacob held full ownership of the recordings.

Shortly after Birth of the Sun was released, Malmsteen released The Genesis in Japan, an album containing most of the same tracks with Jacob's bass parts re-recorded by Malmsteen.

== Reception ==
MetalReviews gave the album a score of 65 out of 100, describing the production quality as "pretty good" after remixing and remastering but recommending it for "die hard fans only."

== Track listing ==
All songs written by Yngwie Malmsteen.

#	Title	Length
1	"Merlin's Castle"	4:53
2	"Birth of the Sun"	9:25
3	"Speed and Action"	3:48
4	"Dying Man"	8:46
5	"Suite Opus III"	12:55
6	"Voodoo Nights"	8:38

== Personnel ==
- Yngwie Malmsteen – guitars
- Marcel Jacob – bass, mixing, mastering
- Zepp Urgard – drums
