= Inspiration (Yngwie Malmsteen album) =

Studio album by Yngwie Malmsteen
- Released: 14 October 1996
- Studios: Studio 308 in Miami; Heptagon Studios in Malmö
- Genres: Heavy metal, hard rock, progressive rock, neoclassical metal
- Length: 56:59
- Label: Music for Nations
- Producers: Yngwie Malmsteen, Chris Tsangarides

Yngwie Malmsteen chronology
Magnum Opus (1995)	Inspiration (1996)	Facing the Animal (1997)

Alternative cover
- 2000 reissue

Alternative cover
- 2003 remastered edition

Professional ratings
Review scores
Source	Rating
AllMusic	1.5/5 stars

Inspiration is the ninth studio album by Swedish guitarist Yngwie Malmsteen, released on 14 October 1996. It is a tribute album consisting entirely of covers of various bands who influenced Malmsteen. Featured on vocals are Jeff Scott Soto, Mark Boals and Joe Lynn Turner, all of whom performed on Malmsteen's first four studio albums.

== Background ==
In 1996, Yngwie Malmsteen recorded Inspiration as a tribute to the guitarists and bands that had influenced his musical development. He conceived the idea of a cover album while touring in support of his 1995 album Magnum Opus, with the intention of revisiting his musical roots. After the tour ended, in January 1996, he completed his home studio in Miami, United States, and invited musicians he had previously worked with to participate in the recording sessions. The album's title, Inspiration, reflected its collection of songs that had inspired him during his childhood.

Malmsteen particularly regarded Ritchie Blackmore as his greatest musical inspiration during childhood. Consequently, the album featured several songs originally performed by Deep Purple and Rainbow, both bands with which Blackmore had been associated. Malmsteen identified Deep Purple's "Pictures of Home", "Mistreated", "Demon's Eye" and "Child in Time" as songs he had admired for many years, explaining that Blackmore's playing had a major influence on the album's track selection.

In addition to Deep Purple material, the album included Kansas's "Carry On Wayward Son", Rainbow's "Gates of Babylon", Jimi Hendrix's "Manic Depression" and "Spanish Castle Magic", U.K.'s "In the Dead of Night", Scorpions' "The Sails of Charon" and Rush's "Anthem". The track listing primarily consisted of hard rock and heavy metal songs that had influenced Malmsteen from an early age.

Recording took place at Studio 308, a studio located at Malmsteen's home in Miami, while the drums were recorded at Heptagon Studios in Malmö, Sweden. Mixing was carried out at Criteria Studios in Miami. Malmsteen produced the album himself, with Chris Tsangarides serving as co-producer. The recording sessions featured several vocalists who had previously collaborated with Malmsteen, including Jeff Scott Soto, Mark Boals and Joe Lynn Turner. Keyboard duties were handled by Jens Johansson, Mats Olausson and David Rosenthal, while Anders Johansson played drums.

Malmsteen also revealed that he used a Studer two-inch tape recorder among the studio equipment during the recording sessions. He regarded the machine as one of the finest analogue recording systems available at the time and highlighted the use of analogue tape throughout the album's recording process.

== Track listing ==
No.	Title	Writer(s)	Original artist(s)	Length
1.	"Carry On Wayward Son"	Kerry Livgren	Kansas	5:09
2.	"Pictures of Home"	Ritchie Blackmore, Ian Gillan, Roger Glover, Jon Lord, Ian Paice	Deep Purple	4:56
3.	"Gates of Babylon"	Blackmore, Ronnie James Dio	Rainbow	7:12
4.	"Manic Depression"	Jimi Hendrix	The Jimi Hendrix Experience	3:39
5.	"In the Dead of Night"	Eddie Jobson, John Wetton	U.K.	6:11
6.	"Mistreated"	Blackmore, David Coverdale	Deep Purple	7:29
7.	"The Sails of Charon"	Uli Jon Roth	Scorpions	5:05
8.	"Demon's Eye"	Blackmore, Gillan, Glover, Lord, Paice	Deep Purple	4:53
9.	"Anthem"	Geddy Lee, Alex Lifeson, Neil Peart	Rush	4:18
10.	"Child in Time"	Blackmore, Gillan, Glover, Lord, Paice	Deep Purple	8:07
Total length:				56:59

Japanese edition bonus track
No.	Title	Writer(s)	Original artist(s)	Length
11.	"Spanish Castle Magic"	Hendrix	The Jimi Hendrix Experience	3:07

== Personnel ==
- Yngwie Malmsteen – guitars, bass (except track 1), sitar, vocals (track 4), engineering, producer
- Jeff Scott Soto – vocals (tracks 1, 3, 6), engineering
- Joe Lynn Turner – vocals (tracks 2, 8, 11)
- Mark Boals – vocals (tracks 5, 7, 9, 10)
- Anders Johansson – drums, engineering
- David Rosenthal – keyboards (tracks 1, 3, 10)
- Mats Olausson – keyboards (tracks 2, 6)
- Jens Johansson – keyboards (tracks 5, 8)
- Marcel Jacob – bass (track 1)
- Chris Tsangarides – engineering
- Keith Rose – engineering

== Release history ==
Region	Date	Label
Europe	14 October 1996	Music for Nations
Japan	14 October 1996	Pony Canyon
United States	14 October 1996	Foundation
United States (reissue)	2000	Spitfire
Europe (remaster)	2003	SPV/Steamhammer

== Charts ==
Chart (1996)	Peak position
Finnish albums chart	16
Swedish albums chart	35

== Certifications and sales ==
Region	Certification	Certified units/sales
Japan (RIAJ)	Gold	100,000^{^}
^{^} Shipments figures based on certification alone.
