= Fire & Ice (Yngwie Malmsteen album) =

Studio album by Yngwie Malmsteen
- Released: 7 February 1992
- Studio: Criteria Studios, Miami; Polar Studios, Stockholm
- Genre: Neoclassical metal; heavy metal; hard rock
- Length: 64:38
- Label: Elektra
- Producer: Yngwie Malmsteen

Yngwie Malmsteen chronology
The Yngwie Malmsteen Collection (1991)	Fire & Ice (1992)	The Seventh Sign (1994)

Singles from Fire & Ice
- 1. "Teaser" Released: 1992

Fire & Ice is the sixth studio album by guitarist Yngwie Malmsteen, released on 7 February 1992 through Elektra Records. The album topped the Japanese albums chart, reached No. 121 on the US Billboard 200 and charted within the top 90 in the Netherlands, Sweden and Switzerland.

== Critical reception ==
Professional ratings
Review scores
Source	Rating
AllMusic	3/5 stars

Steve Huey at AllMusic gave Fire & Ice three stars out of five, saying that it is "most successful when Malmsteen returns to the heavy baroque influence of his early work" and that "there are some fine longer compositions here that will please hardcore Yngwie fans." He criticised the album's single, "Teaser", as being "a flawed stab at radio rock" and sounding like "a generic, clichéd hair metal song with Malmsteen on guitar."

== Track listing ==
All music is composed by Yngwie Malmsteen, except where noted.

No.	Title	Lyrics	Length
1.	"Perpetual"	(instrumental)	4:14
2.	"Dragonfly" (music: Malmsteen, Göran Edman)	Malmsteen	4:49
3.	"Teaser"	Malmsteen, Edman	3:29
4.	"How Many Miles to Babylon"	Malmsteen, Edman	6:10
5.	"Cry No More"	Malmsteen, Edman	5:17
6.	"No Mercy" (contains an arrangement of Johann Sebastian Bach's "Badinerie")	Malmsteen	5:32
7.	"C'est la vie"	Malmsteen, Edman	5:19
8.	"Leviathan"	(instrumental)	4:24
9.	"Fire and Ice"	Malmsteen, Edman	4:31
10.	"Forever Is a Long Time"	Malmsteen, Edman	4:28
11.	"I'm My Own Enemy"	Edman	6:09
12.	"All I Want Is Everything"	Malmsteen	4:02
13.	"Golden Dawn"	(instrumental)	1:28
14.	"Final Curtain"	Malmsteen	4:46
Total length:			64:38

Japanese edition bonus track
No.	Title	Lyrics	Length
15.	"Broken Glass"	Malmsteen	4:02

== Personnel ==
- Yngwie Malmsteen – guitar, Moog Taurus, sitar, strings arrangement, backing vocals, producer
- Göran Edman – lead vocals
- Mats Olausson – keyboards
- Bo Werner – drums (except track 8), backing vocals
- Michael Von Knorring – drums (track 8)
- Svante Henryson – bass, cello, strings arrangement assistance
- Per Bögberg – viola
- Ulf Forsberg – violin
- Svein-Harald Martinsen – violin
- Kalle Moraeus – violin
- Lolo Lannerbäck – flute
- Simon Hanhart – engineering
- Keith Rose – engineering assistance
- Steve Thompson – mixing
- Michael Barbiero – mixing
- George Marino – mastering

== Chart performance ==
Year	Chart	Position
1992	Japanese albums chart	1
1992	Billboard Heatseekers	2
1992	Swedish albums chart	11
1992	Swiss albums chart	30
1992	Dutch albums chart	89
1992	Billboard 200	121

== Certifications ==
Region	Certification	Certified units/sales
Japan (RIAJ)	Gold	100,000^{^}
^{^} Shipments figures based on certification alone.

== See also ==
- List of Oricon number-one albums of 1992
