= Alchemy (Yngwie Malmsteen album) =

Studio album by Yngwie Malmsteen
- Released: 23 November 1999
- Recorded: 1999
- Genres: Neoclassical metal; heavy metal
- Length: 70:26
- Label: Pony Canyon
- Producer: Yngwie Malmsteen

Yngwie Malmsteen chronology
Concerto Suite for Electric Guitar and Orchestra (1998)	Alchemy (1999)	War to End All Wars (2000)

Singles from Alchemy
- 1. "Hangar 18, Area 51"

Professional ratings
Review scores
Source	Rating
AllMusic	2.5/5 stars

Alchemy is the twelfth studio album by guitarist Yngwie Malmsteen, released on 17 September 1999 through Pony Canyon (Japan), and through Dream Catcher (Europe) and Spitfire Records (United States) on 23 November 1999.

Artension vocalist John West was originally going to sing on the album, but left the recording sessions after only three days following a falling out with Malmsteen and was replaced by a returning Mark Boals.

== Track listing ==
All lyrics are written by Yngwie Malmsteen (except instrumentals); all music is composed by Yngwie Malmsteen.

No.	Title	Length
1.	"Blitzkrieg (Instrumental)"	4:14
2.	"Leonardo"	7:36
3.	"Playing with Fire"	6:17
4.	"Stand (The)"	5:05
5.	"Wield My Sword"	6:13
6.	"Blue (Instrumental)"	4:11
7.	"Legion of the Damned"	5:51
8.	"Deamon Dance (7,405,926)"	5:25
9.	"Hangar 18, Area 51"	4:44
10.	"Voodoo Nights"	7:31
11.	"Asylum I - Asylum (Instrumental)"	4:07
12.	"Asylum II - Sky Euphoria (Instrumental)"	3:19
13.	"Asylum III - Quantum Leap (Instrumental)"	3:55

=== Bonus track (Japanese edition) ===
No.	Title	Writer(s)	Length
14.	"God Is God"	Malmsteen	3:12

== Personnel ==
- Yngwie J. Malmsteen – lead guitars, rhythm guitars, acoustic guitars, guitar synthesizer, bass, Moog Taurus pedals, sitar and vocals
- Mark Boals – vocals
- Barry Dunaway – bass
- John Macaluso – drums
- Mats Olausson – keyboards, backing vocals
- Rich DiSilvio – cover art and package design
