= Magnum Opus (Yngwie Malmsteen album) =

Studio album by Yngwie Malmsteen
- Released: 17 October 1995
- Recorded: Criteria Studios in Miami
- Genre: Neoclassical metal, heavy metal
- Length: 50:09
- Label: Music for Nations
- Producer: Yngwie Malmsteen, Chris Tsangarides

Yngwie Malmsteen chronology
I Can't Wait (1994)	Magnum Opus (1995)	Inspiration (1996)

Alternative cover
- Japanese edition

Alternative cover
- 2000 reissue

Alternative cover
- 2003 remastered edition

Magnum Opus is the eighth studio album by Swedish guitarist Yngwie Malmsteen, released on 17 October 1995. It reached No. 11 and 17 on the Finnish and Swedish albums chart respectively.

== Critical reception ==
Professional ratings
Review scores
Source	Rating
AllMusic	3/5 stars

Steve Huey at AllMusic gave Magnum Opus three stars out of five, calling it a "predictable mix of generic hard rockers, sugary ballads, and Malmsteen's trademark neo-classical guitar instrumentals." He said the album had nothing new to offer, but nonetheless recommended it for diehard Malmsteen fans.

== Track listing ==
All music is composed by Yngwie Malmsteen, except where noted.

No.	Title	Lyrics	Length
1.	"Vengeance"	Michael Vescera, Malmsteen	4:49
2.	"No Love Lost"	Vescera	3:07
3.	"Tomorrow's Gone"	Vescera	5:20
4.	"The Only One"	Vescera	4:01
5.	"I'd Die Without You"	Malmsteen	5:49
6.	"Overture 1622"	(instrumental)	2:41
7.	"Voodoo"	Malmsteen	6:19
8.	"Cross the Line"	Vescera	3:32
9.	"Time Will Tell"	Vescera	5:09
10.	"Fire in the Sky"	Malmsteen	4:57
11.	"Amberdawn"	(instrumental)	4:25
Total length:			50:09

Japanese edition/2003 remastered edition bonus track
No.	Title	Lyrics	Length
12.	"Cantabile Op.10 No.3 RV428 "Il Cardellino" ^{†}" (Antonio Vivaldi)	(instrumental)	2:04

^† – Renamed "Tournament" on 2003 reissue

== Personnel ==
- Yngwie Malmsteen – guitar, sitar, background vocals, production
- Michael Vescera – lead vocals
- Mats Olausson – keyboard
- Shane Gaalaas – drums
- Barry Sparks – bass
- Chris Tsangarides – engineering, mixing, production
- Keith Rose – engineering assistance

== Release history ==
Region	Date	Label	Notes
Europe	17 October 1995	Music for Nations	
Japan	17 October 1995	Pony Canyon	
United States	7 November 2000	Spitfire	Reissued
Europe	2003	SPV/Steamhammer	Remastered

== Chart performance ==
Year	Chart	Position
1995	Finnish albums chart	11
1995	Swedish albums chart	17

== Certifications and sales ==
Region	Certification	Certified units/sales
Japan (RIAJ)	Gold	100,000^{^}
^{^} Shipments figures based on certification alone.
