= Unleash the Fury =

Studio album by Yngwie Malmsteen
- Released: 26 July 2005
- Recorded: Studio 308 and Baroque & Roll studios in Miami
- Genre: Neoclassical metal, heavy metal
- Length: 72:07
- Label: Spitfire
- Producer: Yngwie Malmsteen

Yngwie Malmsteen chronology
G3: Rockin' in the Free World (2003)	Unleash the Fury (2005)	Perpetual Flame (2008)

Professional ratings
Review scores
Source	Rating
AllMusic	1.5/5 stars

Unleash the Fury is the fifteenth studio album by Swedish guitarist Yngwie Malmsteen, released on 26 July 2005 through Spitfire Records. Included on the album—which is an enhanced CD—are three videos in QuickTime format. The album's title is a reference to an incident which occurred in 1988 on a flight to Tokyo during the Odyssey tour: having behaved obnoxiously whilst drunk, Malmsteen fell asleep and was later awoken by a woman pouring a jug of iced water on him. Enraged, he twice shouted "You've released the fucking fury!" (often misquoted as "unleashed"). The audio from this incident was caught on tape by drummer Anders Johansson, with bassist Barry Dunaway also being heard in the background.

== Background ==
The album was released under the name "Yngwie J. Malmsteen's Rising Force" and marked his first release after transferring from Pony Canyon to Universal Music Japan. The album title originated from a remark Yngwie made on a flight to Tokyo for the 1988 Odyssey tour. At the time, the band members were drinking heavily on the plane and disturbing other passengers. While Yngwie had distanced himself from the drinking and fallen asleep, a female passenger unrelated to the band accidentally spilled water on him. Angered by the incident, Yngwie exclaimed, "You unleashed the fucking fury!!" An audio recording of this event leaked on the internet in 2001. On 30 July 2016, the band Allegiance Of Rock—featuring Mats Levén (vocals), Gus G (guitar), John Levén (bass), and Anders Johansson (drums)—used the recording as a prelude during their performance of Rising Force at Sweden's HojRock Festival.

Yngwie interprets the instrumental tracks "Fuguetta" and "Paraphrase" as variations inspired by the style of Bach's compositions.

== Track listing ==
All tracks are written by Yngwie Malmsteen.

No.	Title	Length
1.	"Locked & Loaded"	3:46
2.	"Revolution"	4:17
3.	"Cracking the Whip"	3:50
4.	"Winds of War (Invasion)"	5:05
5.	"Crown of Thorns"	4:24
6.	"The Bogeyman"	3:57
7.	"Beauty and a Beast"	3:18
8.	"Fuguetta"	1:01
9.	"Cherokee Warrior"	5:29
10.	"Guardian Angel"	3:20
11.	"Let the Good Times Roll"	4:03
12.	"Revelation (Drinking with the Devil)"	5:38
13.	"Magic and Mayhem"	4:39
14.	"Exile"	3:52
15.	"The Hunt"	4:20
16.	"Russian Roulette"	4:10
17.	"Unleash the Fury"	5:42
18.	"Paraphrase"	1:16
Total length:		72:07

== Personnel ==
- Yngwie Malmsteen – vocals (co-lead on track 3 & lead on track 9), guitar, guitar synthesizer, keyboard, sitar, bass, background vocals, orchestration, arrangement, engineering, production
- Doogie White – vocals (except track 9)
- Joakim Svalberg – keyboards
- Patrick Johansson – drums
- Keith Rose – engineering
- Mike Fraser – mixing
- Mike Fuller – mastering
