= War to End All Wars (album) =

Studio album by Yngwie Malmsteen
- Released: 7 November 2000
- Genre: Neoclassical metal, heavy metal
- Length: 63:27
- Label: Pony Canyon

Yngwie Malmsteen chronology
Alchemy (1999)	War to End All Wars (2000)	The Genesis (2002)

Singles from War to End All Wars
- 1. "Crucify"

Professional ratings
Review scores
Source	Rating
AllMusic	2.5/5 stars

War to End All Wars is the thirteenth studio album by guitarist Yngwie Malmsteen, released on 7 November 2000 through Pony Canyon (Japan), Spitfire Records (United States) and DreamCatcher Records (Europe). While on tour for this album, singer Mark Boals left the band and was replaced for a brief period by Jørn Lande; however, Boals returned to finish the tour. The instrumental song "Molto Arpeggiosa" is often mislabelled as "Arpeggios from Hell". The phrase "the war to end all wars" was historically used as a description of World War I, especially in the period from 1918 to 1939.

== Track listing ==
No.	Title	Lyrics	Music	Length
1.	"Prophet of Doom" (features some parts by Paganini)	Yngwie Malmsteen	Malmsteen	5:31
2.	"Crucify"	Malmsteen	Malmsteen	6:44
3.	"Bad Reputation"	Malmsteen	Malmsteen	4:53
4.	"Catch 22"	Malmsteen	Malmsteen	4:13
5.	"Masquerade"	Malmsteen	Malmsteen	4:54
6.	"Molto Arpeggiosa"	(instrumental)	Malmsteen	4:14
7.	"Miracle of Life"	Malmsteen	Malmsteen	5:39
8.	"The Wizard"	Malmsteen	Malmsteen	5:19
9.	"Preludium"	(instrumental)	Malmsteen	2:26
10.	"Wild One"	Malmsteen	Malmsteen	5:46
11.	"Tarot"	Malmsteen	Malmsteen	5:38
12.	"InstruMental Institution"	(instrumental)	Malmsteen	3:56
13.	"War to End All Wars"	Malmsteen	Malmsteen	4:15

=== Bonus tracks (Japan) ===
No.	Title	Lyrics	Music	Length
14.	"Treasure from the East"	(instrumental)	Malmsteen	3:52
15.	"Requiem"	(instrumental)	Malmsteen	4:03

=== Bonus track (USA and Europe) ===
No.	Title	Lyrics	Music	Length
14.	"Black Sheep of the Family"	Yngwie Malmsteen	Yngwie Malmsteen	2:17

== Personnel ==
- Yngwie J. Malmsteen - guitars, bass, sitar, vocals, producer, mixing
- Mats Olausson - keyboards
- Mark Boals - vocals
- John Macaluso - drums
- Brian Fitzpatrick - engineer, mixing
- Michael Fuller - mastering
- Michael Johansson - photography
- Rich DiSilvio - artwork
- Frank Frazetta - cover art
