= Facing the Animal =

Studio album by Yngwie Malmsteen
- Released: September 3rd 1997
- Recorded: Studio 308 and Criteria Studios in Miami
- Genre: Neoclassical metal, heavy metal
- Length: 59:33
- Label: Pony Canyon
- Producer: Yngwie Malmsteen, Chris Tsangarides

Yngwie Malmsteen chronology
Inspiration (1996)	Facing the Animal (1997)	Double Live (1998)

Alternative cover
- United States edition

Facing the Animal is the tenth studio album by Swedish guitarist Yngwie Malmsteen, released in 1997 through Pony Canyon (Japan) and Mercury Records (United States). The album reached No. 20 on the Finnish albums chart and No. 39 on the Swedish albums chart.

Although credited to Malmsteen, "Air on a Theme" is an arrangement of the second movement (Largo) of Antonio Vivaldi's "Piccolo Concerto in C Major (RV443)". Facing the Animal features one of drummer Cozy Powell's last performances before his death in April 1998.

== Critical reception ==
Professional ratings
Review scores
Source	Rating
AllMusic	3/5 stars

Stephen Thomas Erlewine gave Facing the Animal three stars out of five, saying that "much of the record is stronger than anything Malmsteen has recorded in years" but also calling it "predictable, from the rockers to the power ballads".

== Track listing ==
All tracks are written by Yngwie Malmsteen and Mats Levén, except tracks 5 and 13 (Malmsteen).

No.	Title	Length
1.	"Braveheart"	5:19
2.	"Facing the Animal"	4:37
3.	"Enemy"	4:53
4.	"Sacrifice"	4:19
5.	"Like an Angel – For April"	5:47
6.	"My Resurrection"	4:48
7.	"Another Time"	5:03
8.	"Heathens from the North"	3:39
9.	"Alone in Paradise"	4:33
10.	"End of My Rope"	4:24
11.	"Only the Strong"	6:05
12.	"Poison in Your Veins"	4:23
13.	"Air on a Theme"	1:43
Total length:		59:33

Japanese edition bonus track
No.	Title	Length
14.	"Casting Pearls Before the Swine"	3:57

== Personnel ==
- Yngwie Malmsteen – guitar, bass (tracks 1, 4, 6, 12), background vocals, arrangement, production
- Mats Levén – lead vocals (except track 13)
- Mats Olausson – keyboards
- Cozy Powell – drums (except track 13)
- Barry Dunaway – bass (except tracks 1, 4, 6, 12, 13)
- Chris Tsangarides – engineering, mixing, production
- Keith Rose – engineering assistance
- Rod Fuller – mastering

== Chart performance ==
Year	Chart	Position
1998	Finnish albums chart	20
1998	Swedish albums chart	39

== Certifications ==
Region	Certification	Certified units/sales
Japan (RIAJ)	Gold	100,000^{^}
^{^} Shipments figures based on certification alone.
