= The Seventh Sign (album) =

Studio album by Yngwie Malmsteen
- Released: 9 May 1994
- Recorded: New River Studios in Fort Lauderdale, Florida
- Genre: Neoclassical metal, heavy metal
- Length: 48:31
- Label: Music for Nations
- Producer: Yngwie Malmsteen

Yngwie Malmsteen chronology
Fire & Ice (1992)	The Seventh Sign (1994)	I Can't Wait (1994)

Alternative cover
- 2000 Japanese reissue

Alternative cover
- 2003 remastered edition

Alternative cover
- 2011 reissue

Singles from The Seventh Sign
- 1. "Forever One" / "Brothers" Released: 18 February 1994

The Seventh Sign is the seventh studio album by Swedish guitarist Yngwie Malmsteen, released on 9 May 1994.

== Background ==
The album is a studio release that came two years after Fire & Ice and was produced with former Loudness vocalist Mike Vescera. The obi strip commentary on the Japanese edition describes it as: "The ultimate classical flavor! Yngwie's greatest masterpiece, finally complete!"

The cover design differs between the Western and Japanese editions. Yngwie has expressed his dislike for the Japanese version, recalling that he was furious upon seeing the triangular shape on the nose, saying, "They drew a triangle on my face." He also faced considerable difficulty selecting a vocalist, reportedly approaching or holding sessions with Don Dokken, Ronnie James Dio, Ian Gillan, Steve Perry, Kelly Keeling, and former band members Joe Lynn Turner, Jeff Scott Soto, and Mark Boals.

== Reception and legacy ==
Professional ratings
Review scores
Source	Rating
AllMusic	3/5 stars

The Seventh Sign reached No. 11 on the Swedish albums chart and No. 47 on the Swiss albums chart, both in 1994. In July 2014, Guitar World magazine placed the album at No. 46 on their "Superunknown: 50 Iconic Albums That Defined 1994" list.

Steve Huey at AllMusic gave The Seventh Sign three stars out of five, saying that Malmsteen's extensive use of a wah pedal in the style of Jimi Hendrix makes the album "necessary for Malmsteen fans, even though his more neo-classical work (solos, instrumentals, etc.) seems less inspired here." He also heavily criticised the power ballad "Prisoner of Your Love", calling it "downright embarrassing."

== Track listing ==
All music is composed by Yngwie Malmsteen.

No.	Title	Lyrics	Music	Length
1.	"Never Die"	Malmsteen	Malmsteen	3:29
2.	"I Don't Know"	Malmsteen, Michael Vescera	Malmsteen	3:25
3.	"Meant to Be"	Malmsteen	Malmsteen	3:52
4.	"Forever One"	Malmsteen	Malmsteen	4:35
5.	"Hairtrigger"	Malmsteen	Malmsteen	2:43
6.	"Brothers"	(instrumental)	Malmsteen	3:47
7.	"Seventh Sign"	Malmsteen	Malmsteen	6:31
8.	"Bad Blood"	Malmsteen, Vescera	Malmsteen	4:25
9.	"Prisoner of Your Love"	Amberdawn Malmsteen	Malmsteen	4:27
10.	"Pyramid of Cheops"	Malmsteen	Malmsteen	5:10
11.	"Crash and Burn"	Malmsteen, Vescera	Malmsteen	4:05
12.	"Sorrow"	(instrumental)	Malmsteen	2:02
Total length:				48:31

Japanese edition bonus track
No.	Title	Lyrics	Music	Length
13.	"Angel in Heat"	Malmsteen	Malmsteen	4:15

2003 remastered edition bonus track
No.	Title	Lyrics	Music	Length
13.	"In the Distance"	(instrumental)	Malmsteen	2:47

== Personnel ==
- Yngwie Malmsteen – vocals ("Angel in Heat"), guitar, bass, sitar, producer
- Michael Vescera – vocals
- Mats Olausson – keyboard, Hammond organ
- Mike Terrana – drums, triangle
- Jim Thomas – engineering
- Jeff Glixman – engineering
- Mike Fraser – mixing
- Keith Rose – mixing assistance

== Release history ==
Region	Date	Label	Notes
Europe	9 May 1994	Music for Nations	
Japan	9 May 1994	Pony Canyon	
Germany	2003	SPV/Steamhammer	Remastered
Worldwide	2011	Rising Force Records	Reissued (MP3-only)

== Chart performance ==
Year	Chart	Position
1994	Swedish albums chart	11
1994	Swiss albums chart	47

== Certifications ==
Region	Certification	Certified units/sales
Japan (RIAJ)	Platinum	200,000^{^}
^{^} Shipments figures based on certification alone.
