= Live!! (Yngwie Malmsteen album) =

Live album by Yngwie Malmsteen
- Released: 1998
- Recorded: 5–7 May 1998
- Venue: Olympia, São Paulo, Brazil; Metropolitan, Rio de Janeiro, Brazil
- Genre: Neoclassical metal; heavy metal; hard rock
- Label: Dreamcatcher
- Producer: Yngwie Malmsteen

Yngwie Malmsteen chronology
Facing the Animal (1997)	Live!! (1998)	Concerto Suite for Electric Guitar and Orchestra (1998)

Alternative cover
- 2000 reissue

Live!! is a live album by guitarist Yngwie Malmsteen, released in 1998 through Dreamcatcher Records; it was reissued in 2000 as Double Live in the United States through Spitfire Records. The album was recorded live in Brazil on 5–6 May 1998 at the Olympia in São Paulo, and on 7 May 1998 at the Metropolitan in Rio de Janeiro. According to singer Mats Leven, most of the recordings originate from the second night in São Paulo.

== Critical reception ==
Professional ratings
Review scores
Source	Rating
AllMusic	3/5 stars

== Track listing ==
=== Disc one ===
No.	Title	Lyrics	Music	Length
1.	"My Resurrection"	Yngwie Malmsteen	Malmsteen	5:38
2.	"Facing the Animal"	Malmsteen	Malmsteen	4:21
3.	"Rising Force"	Joe Lynn Turner	Malmsteen	5:08
4.	"Bedroom Eyes"	Göran Edman, Malmsteen	Malmsteen	5:54
5.	"Far Beyond the Sun"	(instrumental)	Malmsteen	9:14
6.	"Like an Angel"	Malmsteen	Malmsteen	6:08
7.	"Braveheart"	Malmsteen	Malmsteen	4:52
8.	"Seventh Sign"	Malmsteen	Malmsteen	6:44
9.	"Guitar solo (Trilogy Suite, Red House, Badinere)"	(instrumental)	Malmsteen	15:03

=== Disc two ===
No.	Title	Lyrics	Music	Length
1.	"Gates of Babylon"	Ronnie James Dio	Ritchie Blackmore	7:45
2.	"Alone in Paradise"	Malmsteen	Malmsteen	4:54
3.	"Pictures of Home"	Ian Gillan	Blackmore, Roger Glover, Jon Lord, Ian Paice	4:38
4.	"Never Die"	Malmsteen	Malmsteen	6:56
5.	"Black Star"	(instrumental)	Malmsteen	7:18
6.	"I'll See the Light, Tonight"	Jeff Scott Soto, Malmsteen	Malmsteen	4:48

== Personnel ==
- Yngwie J. Malmsteen - Guitars, Vocals on "Red House"
- Mats Levén - Vocals
- Mats Olausson - Keyboards
- Barry Dunaway - Bass
- Jonas Ostman - Drums
- Rich DiSilvio - Cover art & package design

While Cozy Powell performed on the Facing the Animal studio album, he had declined to participate in the supporting tour. The first show of this 36 date run was on March 26, 1998, at Jaxx Nightclub. Cozy died on April 5th, 1998.

== Japanese Version ==
In Japan the album was released with an EP with 3 songs live of the Brazilian hard rock band Dr. Sin. This EP was called 'Live in Brazil'.
