= I Can't Wait (EP) =

EP by Yngwie Malmsteen
- Released: 21 October 1994
- Recorded: 1994
- Genre: Neoclassical metal
- Length: 23:05
- Label: Pony Canyon

Yngwie Malmsteen chronology
The Seventh Sign (1994)	I Can't Wait (1994)	Magnum Opus (1995)

Professional ratings
Review scores
Source	Rating
AllMusic	link

I Can't Wait is a 1994 EP released by Yngwie Malmsteen only in Japan. It contains three studio tracks and two live tracks from the 1994 Budokan concert.

The instrumental "Power and Glory" was made as a theme for Japanese pro wrestler and mixed martial artist Nobuhiko Takada.

== Track listing ==
No.	Title	Lyrics	Music	Length
1.	"I Can't Wait"	Michael Vescera	Yngwie Malmsteen	5:04
2.	"Aftermath"	Malmsteen	Malmsteen	3:41
3.	"Rising Force" (Live)	Joe Lynn Turner, Malmsteen	Malmsteen	4:18
4.	"Far Beyond the Sun" (Live)	Instrumental	Malmsteen	5:35
5.	"Power and Glory"	Instrumental	Malmsteen	4:25

== Personnel ==
- Yngwie Malmsteen – guitars, backing vocals
- Mike Vescera – lead vocals
- Mats Olausson – keyboards, backing vocals
- Mike Terrana – drums, backing vocals
- Barry Sparks – bass, backing vocals
