= G3: Rockin' in the Free World =

Live album by Joe Satriani, Steve Vai and Yngwie Malmsteen
- Released: February 17, 2004
- Recorded: October 21, 2003
- Venue: Uptown Theater (Kansas City, Missouri)
- Genre: Rock
- Length: 92:47
- Label: Epic
- Producers: Joe Satriani; Steve Vai; Yngwie Malmsteen

Joe Satriani chronology
Strange Beautiful Music (2002)	G3: Rockin' in the Free World (2004)	Is There Love in Space? (2004)

Steve Vai chronology
Alive in an Ultra World (2001)	G3: Rockin' in the Free World (2003)	Live in London (2004)

Yngwie Malmsteen chronology
Attack!! (2002)	G3: Rockin' in the Free World (2003)	Unleash the Fury (2005)

G3 chronology
G3: Live in Concert (1997)	G3: Rockin' in the Free World (2003)	G3: Live in Tokyo (2005)

G3: Rockin' in the Free World is a double live album by the G3 project that was recorded at The Uptown Theater in Kansas City, Missouri, United States, on October 21, 2003. The album featured the touring lineup of the project leader Joe Satriani, frequent member Steve Vai and guest guitarist Yngwie Malmsteen. A DVD of the same tour, but with a different track list, was released as G3: Live in Denver.

== Critical reception ==
Professional ratings
Review scores
Source	Rating
AllMusic	3/5 stars

In his review for AllMusic, Adrian Zupp described ‘‘G3 Live: Rockin’ in the Free World’’ as an entertaining showcase of the technical abilities of Joe Satriani, Steve Vai and Yngwie Malmsteen, although he noted that their performances sometimes lacked stylistic variety and musical subtlety. He praised Satriani’s set, highlighting the contrast between the energetic “The Extremist” and the more melodic “Always with Me, Always with You”, as well as Vai’s stylistic range. Zupp observed that Malmsteen’s performances demonstrated his renowned speed, but criticised the trio’s interpretations of Jimi Hendrix’s “Voodoo Child (Slight Return)” and “Little Wing”, finding them unfavourable in comparison with the originals. He singled out the closing rendition of Neil Young’s “Rockin’ in the Free World” as a highlight, praising its passion and concluding that the album would appeal particularly to fans of technically accomplished guitar playing.

== Track listing ==
=== Disc 1 ===
==== Joe Satriani ====
All songs written by Joe Satriani.

1. "The Extremist" - 3:53
2. "Crystal Planet" - 4:41
3. "Always with Me, Always with You" - 4:16
4. "Midnight" - 3:05
5. "The Mystical Potato Head Groove Thing" - 5:31

==== Steve Vai ====
All songs written by Steve Vai.

6. "You're Here" - 3:33
7. "Reaping" - 7:05
8. "Whispering a Prayer" - 9:27

==== Yngwie Malmsteen ====
All songs written by Yngwie Malmsteen except where noted.

9. "Blitzkrieg" - 2:50
10. "Trilogy Suite Op.5, the First Movement" - 8:07
11. "Red House" (Jimi Hendrix) - 4:25
12. "Fugue (Concerto Suite for Electric Guitar and Orchestra in E Flat Minor Op.1)" - 3:37
13. "Finale" - 2:54

=== Disc 2 ===
==== The G3 Jam ====
1. "Voodoo Child (Slight Return)" (Jimi Hendrix) - 10:46
2. "Little Wing" (Jimi Hendrix) - 6:08
3. "Rockin' in the Free World" (Neil Young) - 12:29

== Personnel ==
=== Joe Satriani ===
- Joe Satriani - lead guitar, vocals, keyboard
- Galen Henson - rhythm guitar
- Matt Bissonette - bass guitar
- Jeff Campitelli - drums

=== Steve Vai ===
- Steve Vai - lead guitar, vocals
- Dave Weiner - rhythm guitar
- Billy Sheehan - bass guitar
- Tony MacAlpine - keyboards, lead guitar
- Jeremy Colson - drums

=== Yngwie Malmsteen ===
- Yngwie Malmsteen - lead guitar, vocals
- Mick Cervino - bass guitar
- Joakim Svalberg - keyboards
- Patrick Johansson - drums
