= Trilogy (Yngwie Malmsteen album) =

Studio album by Yngwie Malmsteen
- Released: October 1986
- Studios: The Village, Los Angeles
- Genres: Heavy metal; neoclassical metal; Glam Metal
- Length: 40:58
- Label: Polydor
- Producer: Yngwie Malmsteen

Yngwie Malmsteen chronology
Marching Out (1985)	Trilogy (1986)	Odyssey (1988)

Singles from Trilogy
- 1. "You Don't Remember, I'll Never Forget" / "Crying" Released: September 1986

Trilogy is the third studio album by guitarist Yngwie Malmsteen, released in October 1986 through Polydor Records. The album reached No. 44 on the US Billboard 200 and charted within the top 60 in the Netherlands and Sweden.

== Background ==
Trilogy was recorded following changes to the band's lineup after the release of its predecessor, Marching Out. After vocalist Jeff Scott Soto left the band, Mark Boals joined as his replacement. Keyboardist Jens Johansson and drummer Anders Johansson also participated in the recording sessions. Following the departure of bassist Marcel Jacob, Malmsteen handled bass duties himself in addition to playing guitar.

The album was recorded at The Village Recorder in Los Angeles, California, United States. In a later interview, Boals recalled that the recording process lasted several months. Although the basic tracks were recorded in approximately one week, Malmsteen's guitar parts took around two months to complete. He explained that Malmsteen spent considerable time working on his guitar parts and experimented with various ideas in the studio during the sessions.

Musically, Trilogy retained Malmsteen's signature fast and technically demanding guitar playing, along with melodies influenced by classical music, while placing greater emphasis on pop elements and melody than its two predecessors. Universal Music Japan described the album as combining the band's established European and classical sound with a more accessible musical approach aimed at the American market. Among the album's tracks, "You Don't Remember, I'll Never Forget" and "Queen in Love" feature Boals's vocals prominently, while the instrumental pieces "Crying" and "Trilogy Suite Op: 5" showcase Malmsteen's guitar playing and classical musical arrangements.

The album's closing track and title reference, "Trilogy Suite Op: 5", is a multi-section instrumental piece that encapsulates Malmsteen's classical influences and guitar techniques. The album also includes a dedication to Olof Palme, the Prime Minister of Sweden, who was assassinated in 1986.

== Critical reception ==
Professional ratings
Review scores
Source	Rating
AllMusic	4/5 stars
Collector's Guide to Heavy Metal	8/10

Steve Huey at AllMusic gave Trilogy four stars out of five, calling it Malmsteen's second best album after his 1984 debut Rising Force. Malmsteen's compositional and lyrical skills were described as being at their peak on Trilogy, while his guitar work was praised as "jaw-droppingly fast and technically demanding". Huey listed "Dark Ages", "You Don't Remember, I'll Never Forget" and "Trilogy Suite Op: 5" as highlights.

Metal Hammer included the album cover on their list of "50 most hilariously ugly rock and metal album covers ever".

== Track listing ==
All tracks are written by Yngwie Malmsteen.

No.	Title	Length
1.	"You Don't Remember, I'll Never Forget"	4:30
2.	"Liar"	4:09
3.	"Queen in Love"	4:04
4.	"Crying" (instrumental)	5:04
5.	"Fury"	3:56
6.	"Fire"	4:12
7.	"Magic Mirror"	3:53
8.	"Dark Ages"	3:54
9.	"Trilogy Suite Op: 5" (instrumental)	7:16
Total length:		40:58

== Personnel ==
- Yngwie Malmsteen – guitar, Moog Taurus, bass, conducting, arrangement, mixing, production
- Mark Boals – vocals (except for tracks 4 & 9)
- Jens Johansson – keyboard, arrangement assistance (track 9; section 2)
- Anders Johansson – drums
- Ricky DeLena – engineering, mixing
- Jimmy Hoyson – engineering assistance
- Robin Levine – engineering assistance

== Charts ==
Chart (1986–87)	Peak position
Canada Top Albums/CDs (RPM)	80
Dutch Albums (Album Top 100)	60
Finnish Albums (The Official Finnish Charts)	7
Japanese Albums (Oricon)	16
Swedish Albums (Sverigetopplistan)	18
US Billboard 200	44
