= High Impact (album) =

Compilation album by Yngwie Malmsteen
- Released: 9 December 2009
- Recorded: After 1993
- Genre: Neoclassical metal, heavy metal, power metal
- Length: 1:06:54
- Label: Rising Force Records

Yngwie Malmsteen chronology
Angels of Love (2009)	High Impact (2009)	Relentless (2010)

High Impact is a compilation album of Yngwie Malmsteen's instrumental performances since 1983, released on 9 December 2009. The album's unique features include one vocal track and a previously unreleased bonus track of Malmsteen's interpretation of Michael Jackson's "Beat It", sung by Tim "Ripper" Owens.

== Track listing ==
No.	Title	Length
1.	"Caprici di Diablo"	4:28
2.	"Brothers"	3:47
3.	"Blitzkrieg"	4:14
4.	"Trilogy Suite"	7:20
5.	"Red House"	4:09
6.	"Finale"	3:55
7.	"Magic City"	7:26
8.	"Molto arpeggiosa (Arpeggios from Hell)"	4:14
9.	"Far Beyond the Sun"	10:02
10.	"Cantabile"	2:05
11.	"Blue"	4:11
12.	"Overture 1622"	2:41
13.	"Fugue"	3:38
14.	"Beat It"	4:40
