= Angels of Love =

Studio album by Yngwie Malmsteen
- Released: 10 March 2009
- Recorded: Late 2008–Early 2009
- Genre: Folk rock, instrumental rock, neoclassical metal
- Length: 51:46
- Label: Rising Force, Koch
- Producer: Yngwie Malmsteen

Yngwie Malmsteen chronology
| Perpetual Flame (2008) | Angels of Love (2009) | High Impact (2009) |

Professional ratings
Review scores
| Source | Rating |
|---|---|
| Allmusic | 2.5/5 stars |

Angels of Love is the seventeenth studio album by Yngwie Malmsteen, released on 10 March 2009. The entirely instrumental album features nine all-new acoustic renditions of previously released material, as well as a previously unreleased track.

Malmsteen re-arranged all the compositions by himself and he is also the only performer on the album, playing acoustic, steel and classical guitars, keyboards, guitar synthesizer and cello, as well as few electric guitar fills.

The woman on the cover is Malmsteen's wife, April.

== Track listing ==
All tracks are written by Yngwie Malmsteen

| No. | Title | Length |
|---|---|---|
| 1. | "Forever One" | 4:49 |
| 2. | "Like an Angel" | 6:05 |
| 3. | "Crying" | 6:02 |
| 4. | "Brothers" | 6:00 |
| 5. | "Memories" | 4:09 |
| 6. | "Save Our Love" | 6:18 |
| 7. | "Ocean Sonata" (previously unreleased) | 6:14 |
| 8. | "Miracle of Life" | 4:31 |
| 9. | "Sorrow" | 2:52 |
| 10. | "Prelude to April" | 4:41 |

== Personnel ==
- Yngwie Malmsteen – acoustic, electric, steel & classical guitars, cello, keyboards, guitar synthesizer
- Keith Rose – mixing
- Michael Troy Abdallah – additional keyboards
