= Perpetual Flame =

Studio album by Yngwie Malmsteen
- Released: 13 October 2008
- Genres: Neoclassical metal, heavy metal
- Length: 66:09
- Labels: Rising Force, Koch
- Producer: Yngwie Malmsteen

Yngwie Malmsteen chronology
Unleash the Fury (2005)	Perpetual Flame (2008)	Angels of Love (2009)

Perpetual Flame is the sixteenth studio album by Swedish guitarist Yngwie Malmsteen and his group Rising Force, released on 13 October 2008 in Europe and on 14 October 2008 in the US and Canada. It was his first album since 2005's Unleash the Fury and features Tim "Ripper" Owens on vocals, and Derek Sherinian on keyboards.

The album was produced by Malmsteen himself, who also served as engineer. It was recorded over a period of a year and half and was mixed by Roy Z, and mastered by Maor Appelbaum. The first issues of the album contained several printing mistakes. It included the lyrics for the song "Tide of Desire" that would later feature on the album Relentless. The spelling of the song "Eleventh Hour" contained errors while some of the initial credits were missing.

The tracks "Red Devil", "Damnation Game", and "Caprici di Diablo" were made as downloadable content for the games Rock Band and Rock Band 2 on 25 November 2008.

For unknown reasons, the song titled "Four Horsemen (Of the Apocalypse)" was not included in the Japanese release.

On tour, Malmsteen was joined by Bjorn Englen on bass and Michael Troy on keyboards.

== Critical reception ==
Professional ratings
Review scores
Source	Rating
AllMusic	4/5 stars
Metal Rules	4/5 stars
Record Collector	4/5 stars

The album has achieved generally positive reviews from critics. Critic Greg Prato of Allmusic writes "Not since the days of Jeff Scott Soto has Yngwie Malmsteen shared the spotlight with a singer who possessed enough pizazz to truly stand toe to toe with the Swedish six-string shredder...the result is Yngwie's best album in some time.

== Track listing ==
All tracks are written by Yngwie Malmsteen.

No.	Title	Length
1.	"Death Dealer"	5:26
2.	"Damnation Game"	5:04
3.	"Live to Fight (Another Day)"	6:13
4.	"Red Devil"	4:07
5.	"Four Horsemen (Of the Apocalypse)"	5:23
6.	"Priest of the Unholy"	6:47
7.	"Be Careful What You Wish For"	5:29
8.	"Caprici di Diablo" (Instrumental)	4:28
9.	"Lament" (Instrumental)	4:31
10.	"Magic City"	7:26
11.	"Eleventh Hour"	8:03
12.	"Heavy Heart" (Instrumental)	5:58

== Personnel ==
- Yngwie Malmsteen – lead & rhythm guitars, bass, additional keyboards, backing vocals and lead vocals on "Magic City".
- Tim "Ripper" Owens – lead vocals
- Derek Sherinian – keyboards
- Patrick Johansson – drums
- Roy Z – mixing
- Maor Appelbaum – mastering
