= The Genesis =

Studio album by Yngwie J. Malmsteen
- Released: 24 December 2002
- Recorded: 1980
- Genre: Neoclassical metal
- Length: 1:09:16
- Label: Pony Canyon

Yngwie J. Malmsteen chronology
War to End All Wars (2000)	The Genesis (2002)	Attack!! (2002)

The Genesis is a 2002 album released by Yngwie J. Malmsteen. It consists of very early recordings (around the time when Malmsteen was seventeen years old), and many of these tracks were reworked for compositions on albums throughout his career. This album is the official version of an album released by Marcel Jacob, Birth of the Sun, which was based on a 1978 demo of Malmsteen's.

Professional ratings
Review scores
Source	Rating
Allmusic	link

== Track listing ==
No.	Title	Writer(s)	Length
1.	"Birth of the Sun"	Yngwie J. Malmsteen	9:25
2.	"Plague in Lucifer's Mind"	Malmsteen	4:30
3.	"Dying Man"	Malmsteen	8:47
4.	"Black Magic Suite Op.3"	Malmsteen	12:53
5.	"Merlin's Castle"	Malmsteen	4:55
6.	"Voodoo Nights"	Malmsteen	8:42
7.	"Hello" (Malmsteen's voice message)	Malmsteen	1:51
8.	"Voodoo Child"	Jimi Hendrix	12:18
9.	"On a Serious Note"	Malmsteen	5:55

== Personnel ==
- Yngwie J. Malmsteen - guitars, bass guitar, vocals
- Marcel Jacob - bass guitar (According to the liner notes, Malmsteen later re-recorded the bass himself).
- Zepp Urgard - drums
