= Rising Force =

Studio album by Yngwie Malmsteen
- Released: 1984
- Studio: Record Plant, Los Angeles
- Genre: Neoclassical metal; instrumental rock; heavy metal
- Length: 39:33
- Label: Polydor
- Producer: Yngwie Malmsteen

Yngwie Malmsteen chronology
Rising Force (1984)	Marching Out (1985)

Rising Force is the first studio album by guitarist Yngwie Malmsteen, released in late 1984 through Polydor Records. This was originally planned as an instrumental side-project of his then-current band Alcatrazz, but due to singer Jeff Scott Soto's appearance on the album, Malmsteen opted to release it as a solo album. It reached No. 14 on the Swedish albums chart and No. 60 on the US Billboard 200, and received a nomination for Best Rock Instrumental Performance at the 1986 Grammy Awards. The album is regarded as a landmark release in the shred and neoclassical metal genres.

== Background ==
The legato guitar playing on this album, reminiscent of a violin, and the high-level crossover between classical music and heavy metal had a significant influence on both the rock and guitar scenes, giving rise to a new genre known as "neoclassical metal" and inspiring many followers. Although the album was nominated for the Grammy Award for Best Rock Instrumental Performance, it did not win; however, it received numerous accolades, including Best New Artist and Best Album in reader polls and other magazine awards. In 2013, Guitar World magazine in the United States ranked it first in their "Top 10 Classic Shred Albums."

The track "Far Beyond the Sun" from the album was used almost unchanged in the soundtrack of the game Ys IV by Nihon Falcom, under the title "A Great Ordeal."

Following this release, Yngwie focused on albums featuring vocals, and his next instrumental album did not appear until Concerto Suite for Electric Guitar and Orchestra in E-flat minor, Op. 1 (1998).

The title Rising Force refers to the band Yngwie formed during his amateur years. From this album onward, he frequently released music under the name Rising Force.

== Critical reception ==
Professional ratings
Review scores
Source	Rating
AllMusic	4/5 stars
Collector's Guide to Heavy Metal	5/10

Steve Huey at AllMusic gave Rising Force four stars out of five, calling it "a revelation upon its release" and "The true inauguration of the age of the guitar shredder." He praised Malmsteen's technique and "blinding virtuosity", as well as highlighting his "obsessions with Bach, Beethoven, and Paganini".

In a 2009 article by Guitar World magazine, Rising Force was ranked first in the all-time top ten list of shred albums. The staff wrote: "Yngwie J. Malmsteen was, is, and always will be the greatest shredder of all time. Hell, he invented the genre with his 1985 [sic] debut."

"Black Star" and "Far Beyond the Sun" have endured as two of Malmsteen's most popular songs, as well as being staples of his live setlist. In a 2008 Guitar World interview, Malmsteen said of the two songs: "I'll probably play 'Far Beyond the Sun' and 'Black Star' until the day I die."

== Track listing ==
All tracks are written by Yngwie Malmsteen.

No.	Title	Length
1.	"Black Star"	4:53
2.	"Far Beyond the Sun"	5:52
3.	"Now Your Ships Are Burned"	4:11
4.	"Evil Eye" (based on Johann Krieger's "Bourree")	5:14
5.	"Icarus' Dream Suite Op. 4" (based on Adagio in G minor)	8:33
6.	"As Above, So Below"	4:39
7.	"Little Savage"	5:22
8.	"Farewell"	0:49
Total length:		39:33

== Personnel ==
- Yngwie Malmsteen – guitar, Moog Taurus, bass, arrangement, producer
- Jeff Scott Soto – vocals on tracks 3 & 6
- Jens Johansson – keyboard, harpsichord arrangement (track 7)
- Barriemore Barlow – drums
- Lester Claypool – engineering
- Peter Vargo – engineering

== Charts ==
Chart (1985)	Peak position
Japanese Albums (Oricon)	19
Swedish Albums (Sverigetopplistan)	14
US Billboard 200	60

== Awards ==
Event	Award	Result
1986 Grammys	Best Rock Instrumental Performance	Nominated
