= Concerto Suite for Electric Guitar and Orchestra in E-flat minor, Op. 1 =

Studio album by Yngwie Malmsteen
- Released: 4 February 1998
- Recorded: 14–16 June 1997 (orchestra); 15–21 September 1997 (guitar)
- Length: 42:20
- Label: Canyon International
- Producer: Yngwie Malmsteen

Yngwie Malmsteen chronology
Live!! (1998)	Concerto Suite for Electric Guitar and Orchestra in E-flat minor, Op. 1 (1998)	Alchemy (1999)

Professional ratings
Review scores
Source	Rating
AllMusic	3/5 stars

Concerto Suite for Electric Guitar and Orchestra in E-flat minor, Op. 1 is the eleventh studio album by Swedish guitarist Yngwie Malmsteen, released on 4 February 1998 through Canyon International. The album was Malmsteen's first attempt at a classical concerto suite featuring electric guitar solos. All of the music was composed by Malmsteen, though his compositions were scored by his friend and fellow musician David Rosenthal. The music is conducted by Yoel Levi, and performed by the Czech Philharmonic.

Malmsteen has been keen to emphasize that unlike other collaborations between rock musicians and classical orchestras (such as Deep Purple's Concerto for Group and Orchestra), which feature a rock group playing with orchestral accompaniment, this is orchestral music that happens to have an electric guitar as its solo instrument. He has acknowledged that in many of the pieces he had to overdub his guitar solos in order to make them fit. However, the entire piece has since been performed live in Japan with the New Japan Philharmonic and is available as a DVD release.

== Track listing ==
All tracks are written by Yngwie Malmsteen.

No.	Title	Length
1.	"Icarus Dream Fanfare"	5:26
2.	"Cavallino Rampante"	3:57
3.	"Fugue"	3:40
4.	"Prelude to April"	2:43
5.	"Toccata"	3:57
6.	"Andante"	4:21
7.	"Sarabande"	3:23
8.	"Allegro"	1:29
9.	"Adagio"	3:05
10.	"Vivace"	4:50
11.	"Presto Vivace"	3:40
12.	"Finale"	1:49
