= World on Fire (Yngwie Malmsteen album) =

Studio album by Yngwie Malmsteen
- Released: 1 June 2016
- Studio: Studio 308, Miami, FL, USA
- Length: 44:23
- Label: Rising Force Records (US release); Nexus (Japanese release)
- Producer: Yngwie Malmsteen

Yngwie Malmsteen chronology
Spellbound (2012)	World on Fire (2016)	Blue Lightning (2019)

World on Fire is the twentieth studio album by Swedish virtuoso guitar player Yngwie Malmsteen and the eighth under this moniker. Initially it was programmed for April 2016, but then it was released on June 1 via Rising Force Records and Nexus. It was produced by Malmsteen himself and it was the second album in which Malmsteen sang also. This album was also the only one to feature drummer Mark Ellis.

== Background ==
Following his previous album Spellbound, Yngwie did not employ a dedicated vocalist, instead performing the lead vocals himself. Of the eleven tracks on the album, eight are instrumentals, while the remaining three ("World On Fire," "Lost In The Machine," and "Soldier") feature Yngwie on vocals. The initial Japanese pressing included a jacket sticker.

The obi strip commentary on the Japanese edition describes it as: "A solitary hero who captivates with overwhelming speed and passionate performance!! A powerful work imbued with the soul and presence of a king who continues to reign at the top!! After roughly four years, Yngwie Malmsteen, one of the premier guitar heroes of the metal scene, returns with a new album!! Featuring a world of long-established neoclassical aesthetics and aggressively virtuosic guitar playing, this release fully embraces the 'Yngwie World,' leaving no room for compromise and overflowing with the power of the master."

== Track listing ==
All tracks are written by Yngwie Malmsteen.

No.	Title	Length
1.	"World on Fire"	4:32
2.	"Sorcery" (instrumental)	2:18
3.	"Abandon" (instrumental)	2:19
4.	"Top Down, Foot Down" (instrumental)	4:18
5.	"Lost in the Machine"	5:16
6.	"Largo – E♭m" (instrumental)	5:13
7.	"No Rest for the Wicked" (instrumental)	3:11
8.	"Soldier"	5:32
9.	"Duf 1220" (instrumental)	3:17
10.	"Abandon (Slight Return)" (instrumental)	2:31
11.	"Nacht Musik" (instrumental)	5:56
Total length:		44:23

== Personnel ==
- Yngwie Malmsteen - guitars, vocals, bass guitars, keyboards, cello, sitar, producing, arrangement, orchestration
- Mark Ellis - drums

=== Additional personnel ===
- Nick Marinovich - additional keyboards
- The Cantorum Choral Society - additional choir
- The Miami-Dade Baroque String Ensemble - additional strings
- Keith Rose - mixing
- Jun Kawai - liner notes
- Mariko Kawahara - lyrics translations
