= Yngwie Malmsteen =

Swedish-American guitarist (born 1963)

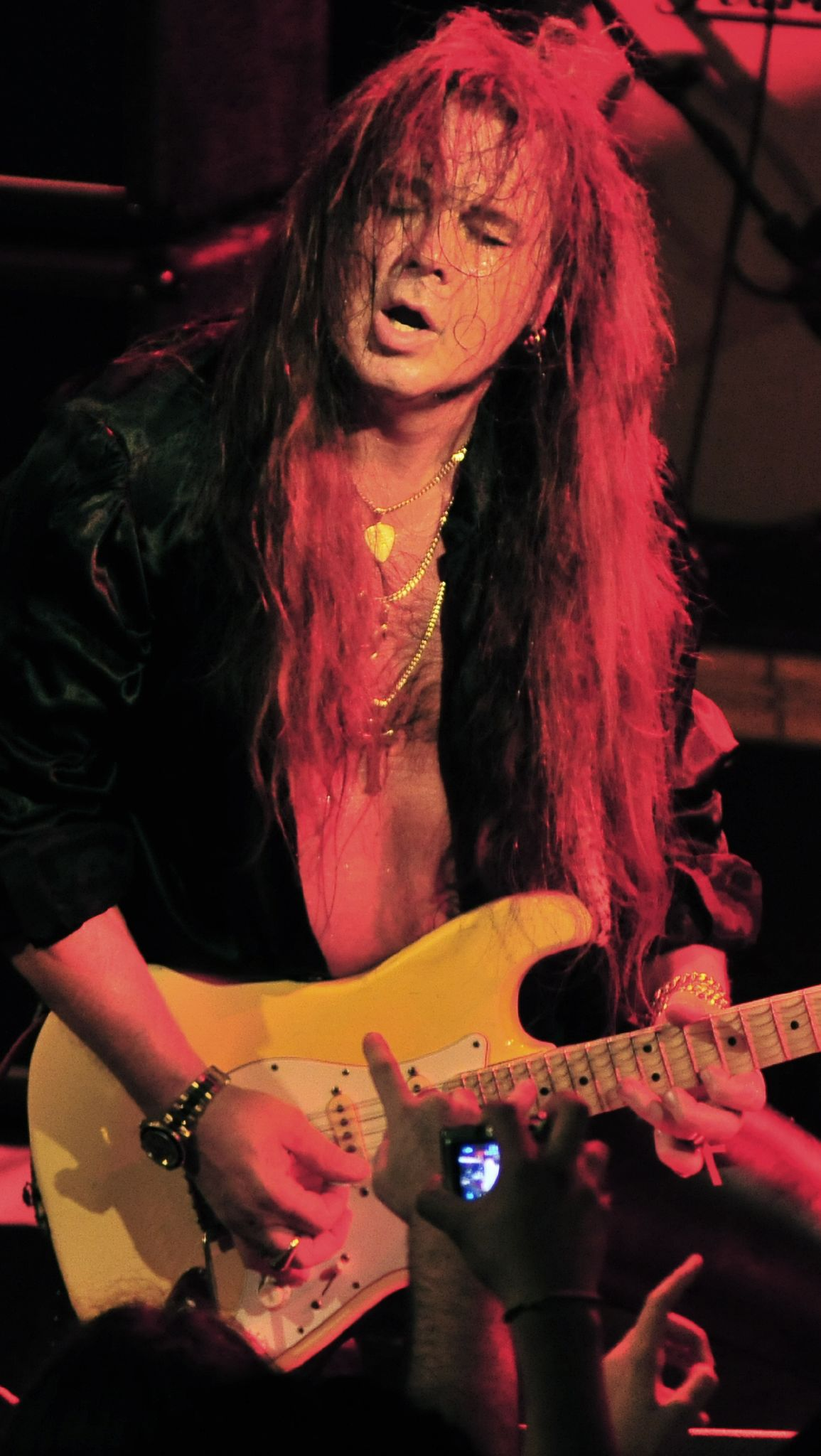
- Yngwie Malmsteen in 2008

Background information
- Also known as: Lars Y. Loudamp
- Born: Lars Johan Yngve Lannerbäck; 30 June 1963 (age 63); Hässelby-Vällingby, Sweden
- Genres: Neoclassical metal; heavy metal
- Occupations: Musician; producer; arranger; composer; songwriter
- Instruments: Guitar; vocals
- Years active: 1976–present
- Labels: Polydor; PolyGram; Elektra; Universal; Mascot
- Member of: Yngwie J. Malmsteen's Rising Force; Generation Axe
- Formerly of: Steeler; Alcatrazz; Hear 'n Aid; G3
- Website: yngwiemalmsteen.com

Yngwie Johan Malmsteen (/ˈɪŋveɪ ˈmɑːlmstiːn/; born Lars Johan Yngve Lannerbäck, Swedish: [lâːʂ ˈjuːhan ˈʏŋvɛ lânːɛrbɛk] on 30 June 1963) is a Swedish-American guitarist. He first became known in the 1980s for his neoclassical playing style in heavy metal, and has released 22 studio albums in a career spanning over 40 years. Malmsteen is considered to be one of the best guitarists in metal. In the early 1990s, he released the albums Eclipse (1990), Fire & Ice (1992), The Seventh Sign (1994) and Magnum Opus (1995).

== Early life ==
Malmsteen was born Lars Johan Yngve Lannerbäck in Stockholm, Sweden, the third child of a musical family. In 1975, his mother reverted to her mother's (Yngwie's maternal grandmother Maud's) maiden name Malmsten, which Yngve promptly also started using as his surname. Later he slightly changed it to Malmsteen and altered his third given name Yngve to "Yngwie". Malmsteen played his first show on 11 May 1976 with his first band, Track on Earth, consisting of himself, his cousin Erik Lannerbäck and an unnamed friend of his from school playing the drums. Later his brother Björn Lannerbäck joined on drums.

As a teenager he was heavily influenced by classical music, particularly 19th century Italian virtuoso violinist and composer Niccolò Paganini as well as Johann Sebastian Bach. Yngwie Malmsteen has publicly stated that he is not influenced by the blues or the style of Ritchie Blackmore, stating that his guitar playing is inspired by classical violin, not classical guitar. Malmsteen has stated that Jimi Hendrix had no musical impact on him and did not contribute to his style. However watching the TV news reports on 18 September 1970 of Hendrix's death, which included footage of Hendrix smashing and burning his guitar at the Monterey Pop Festival in 1967, made Malmsteen think, "This is really cool."

== Career ==
=== 1980s ===
From the late 1970s, Malmsteen played in local bands, sometimes together with future Talisman bassist Marcel Jacob, Europe bassist John Levén and architect Eero Koivisto. They recorded various demos and a single for CBS Records but nothing was officially released from this era until the 2002 releases of Rising Force - Birth of the Sun and Yngwie's own The Genesis album.

In early 1982, Mike Varney of Shrapnel Records first heard Yngwie Malmsteen's music through record store owner Bill Burkard, who played for him a demo tape of Malmsteen's early work (likely the 1978 "Powerhouse" demo) recorded when Yngwie was 15. Later in 1982, Malmsteen sent to Varney an untitled demo recording as a submission for Varney's Guitar Player magazine column. Guitar Player published this demo for the February 1983 edition of the magazine.

In 1983, Varney brought Malmsteen to the United States to play on the recording of Shrapnel recording artist Steeler, also featuring singer Ron Keel and bassist Rik Fox for its self-titled album. He then appeared with Graham Bonnet in the band Alcatrazz, playing on its 1983 debut No Parole from Rock 'n' Roll and the 1984 live album Live Sentence. In July 1984, Bonnet and Malmsteen clashed about who was the frontman and had a fight during a show. Malmsteen was fired on the spot from Alcatrazz and replaced by Steve Vai. Vai had one day to learn the songs for the ongoing tour.

In 1984, Malmsteen released his first solo album Rising Force, which featured Barrie Barlow of Jethro Tull on drums and keyboard player Jens Johansson. His album was meant to be an instrumental side-project of Alcatrazz, but it ended up featuring vocals by Jeff Scott Soto before the release of Rising Force.

Rising Force won Guitar Player's award for Best Rock Album and was nominated for a Grammy Award for 'Best Rock Instrumental', reaching no. 60 on the Billboard album chart. Yngwie J. Malmsteen's Rising Force (as his band was thereafter known) next released Marching Out (1985). Then he recruited Jens Johansson's brother Anders to play drums and bassist Marcel Jacob to record and tour with the band. Jacob left in the middle of a tour and was replaced by Wally Voss. Malmsteen's third album, Trilogy, featuring the vocals of Mark Boals (and Malmsteen on both guitar and bass), was released in 1986. Boals left the band in the middle of the tour and was replaced by the former singer Jeff Scott Soto. The tour was cancelled after Malmsteen was involved in a serious car accident, smashing his V12 Jaguar E-Type into a tree, which put him in a coma for a week. Nerve damage to his right hand was reported. During this time, Malmsteen's mother died from cancer. New line-up changes for the next album included former Rainbow vocalist Joe Lynn Turner joining the band, along with session bassist Bob Daisley, who was hired to record some bass parts and help with the lyrics. In April 1988, he released his fourth album Odyssey. Odyssey was his most successful album, in part due to the success of its first single "Heaven Tonight". Shows in the Soviet Union during the Odyssey tour were recorded and released in 1989 as a fifth album Trial by Fire: Live in Leningrad. The classic Rising Force line-up with Malmsteen and the Johansson brothers was dissolved in 1989 when both Anders and Jens left. That year later, Jens joined Dio replacing keyboardist Claude Schnell.

Malmsteen's neoclassical style of metal became popular among hordes of guitarists during the mid-1980s, with contemporaries such as Jason Becker, Marty Friedman, Paul Gilbert, Tony MacAlpine, and Vinnie Moore becoming prominent. In late 1988, Malmsteen's signature Fender Stratocaster guitar was released, making him and Eric Clapton the first artists to be honored by Fender.

=== 1990s ===
In the early 1990s, Malmsteen released two albums, Eclipse (1990) and Fire & Ice (1992), with the singer Göran Edman (ex-Madison and Vinnie Vincent Invasion), followed by The Seventh Sign (1994) and Magnum Opus (1995) with former Loudness singer Mike Vescera. Despite his early and continuous success in Europe and Asia, by the early 1990s heavy metal styles such as neoclassical metal and shredding had gone out of fashion in the US.

Around 1993, Malmsteen's future mother-in-law – who opposed his engagement to her daughter – had him arrested for allegedly holding her daughter hostage with a gun. The charges were later dropped. Malmsteen continued to record and release albums under the Japanese record label Pony Canyon and maintained a devoted following with fans in Europe and Japan and to a lesser extent in the US.

In the mid 1990s, Malmsteen released the albums Inspiration (1996) featuring three of his former singers Soto, Boals and Turner, Facing the Animal (1997) featuring Mats Levén on vocals and Cozy Powell on drums, followed by a live record Double Live! (1998) and another studio recording Alchemy (1999) featuring once again Mark Boals on vocals.

=== Special guest appearances and side projects ===
In 1996, Malmsteen joined forces with former band members Jeff Scott Soto and Marcel Jacob on the album Human Clay where he played lead guitar on the track "Jealousy". In the same year, Malmsteen recorded guitar solos for two different Deep Purple tribute albums, Smoke on the Water and Black Night – Deep Purple Tribute According to New York, using the alias "Lars Y. Loudamp" on the latter to avoid contractual conflicts. He also guested with Saxon on the song "Denim And Leather" on their live album The Eagle Has Landed – Part II (released in 1997). Later that year, Malmsteen recorded the tracks "Enigma suite" and "All opposable thumbs" with his former band members Jens Johansson and Anders Johansson on their album Johansson/Sonic Winter.

=== 2000s ===
In 2000, he signed a contract with the US record label Spitfire and released his 1990s catalog on the US market for the first time, including what he regards as his masterpiece, Concerto Suite for Electric Guitar and Orchestra, recorded with the Czech Philharmonic in Prague.

After the release of War to End All Wars in 2000, singer Mark Boals left the band. He was replaced by former Rainbow vocalist Doogie White, whose vocals were well received by fans. In 2003, Malmsteen joined Joe Satriani and Steve Vai as part of the G3 supergroup, a tour showcasing guitar performances. Malmsteen made two guest appearances on keyboardist Derek Sherinian's albums Black Utopia (2003) and Blood of the Snake (2006), where Malmsteen plays on the same tracks as Al Di Meola and Zakk Wylde. In 2004, Malmsteen made two cameo appearances on Harvey Birdman, Attorney at Law. In 2005 Unleash the Fury was released through Spitfire Records. As stated in an issue of Guitar World magazine, he titled this album after an infamous 'airline incident', which occurred on a flight to Japan during a 1988 tour. He was drunk and behaving obnoxiously, until he fell asleep and was roused by a woman pouring a jug of iced water on him. Enraged, he shouted, "You've released the fucking fury!" The audio from this incident was caught on tape by a fellow band member. Malmsteen says that the name of the album refers to both the energy of the album and the incident. The release of Unleash the Fury was followed by a DVD release of Concerto Suite For Electric Guitar And Orchestra in E Flat Minor, Op. 1 – With The New Japan Philharmonic Live. The DVD chronicles Malmsteen's first time playing in front of a live audience with an orchestra, an experience that he describes as "fun but also extremely scary".

In 2007, Malmsteen was honored in the Xbox 360 version of Guitar Hero II. Players can receive the "Yngwie Malmsteen" award by hitting 1000 or more notes in succession. February 2008 saw the replacement of singer Doogie White with former Iced Earth and Judas Priest and current Beyond Fear singer Tim "Ripper" Owens, with whom Malmsteen had once recorded a cover of Ozzy Osbourne's song "Mr. Crowley", for the 2000 Osbourne tribute album Bat Head Soup: A Tribute to Ozzy. The first Malmsteen album to feature Owens is titled Perpetual Flame and was released on 4 October. On 25 November 2008, Malmsteen had three of his songs ("Caprici Di Diablo", "Damnation Game", and "Red Devil", all from this latter album) released as downloadable content for the video games Rock Band and Rock Band 2, and later for Rock Band 3.

In 2008, Malmsteen was a special guest on the VH1 Classic show That Metal Show. On 10 March 2009, Malmsteen's label Rising Force released Angels of Love, an all-instrumental album, which featured acoustic arrangements of some of his best-known ballads. Malmsteen released a compilation album titled High Impact on 8 December 2009.

=== 2010–present ===
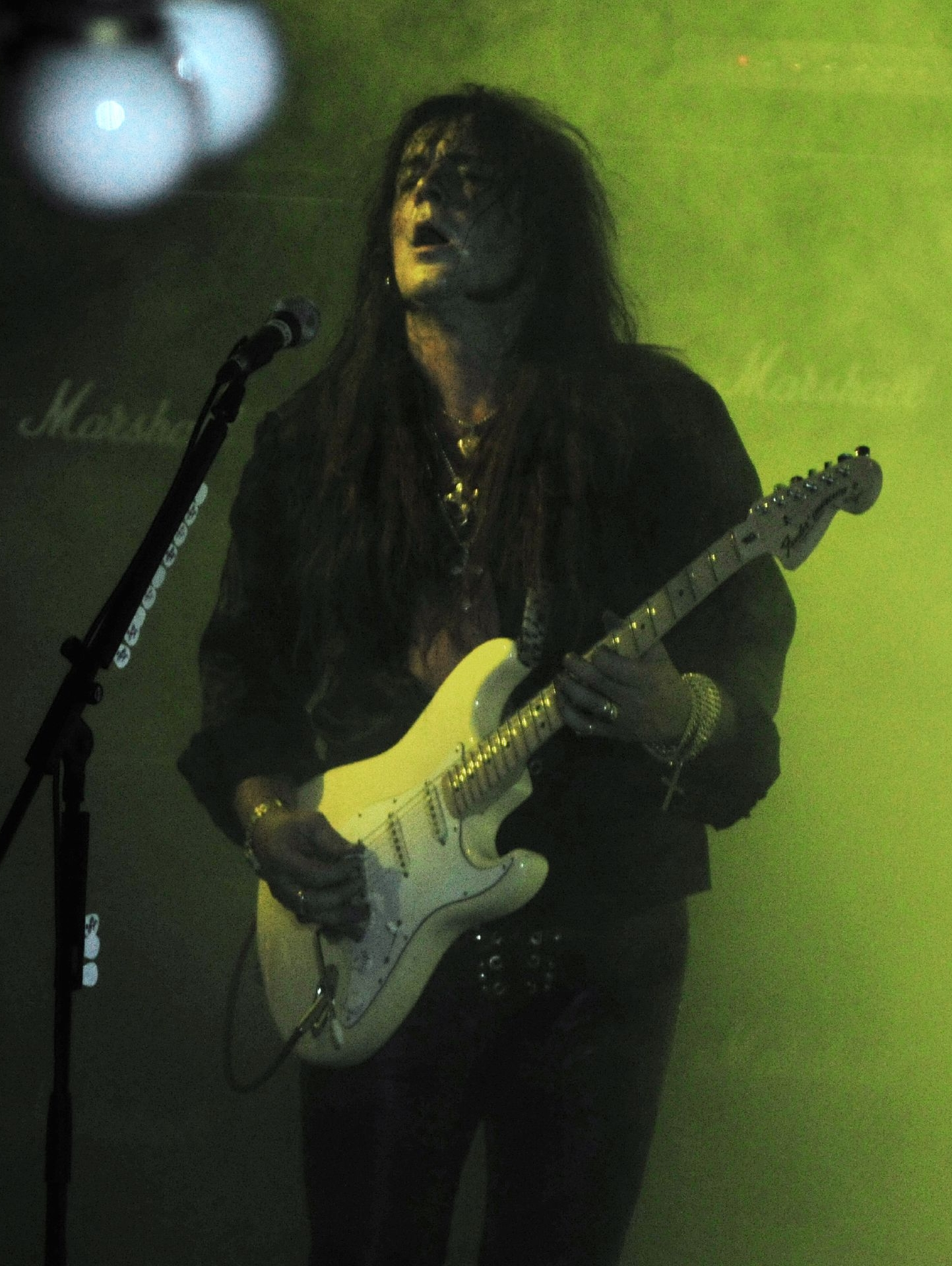
Malmsteen in Barcelona, 2009

On 23 November 2010, Relentless was released, the second album to feature Tim "Ripper" Owens on vocals. The US version featured a remake of "Arpeggios From Hell" as a bonus track. Yngwie appeared on Late Night with Jimmy Fallon on 3 February 2011 to promote his album. On 6 August 2011, Malmsteen made another appearance in the United States, playing a rendition of "The Star-Spangled Banner" before a game between the St. Louis Cardinals and Florida Marlins at Sun Life Stadium. Although rarely seen in his native country of Sweden, Malmsteen played one gig there in 2012. On 7 July, he ended the Getaway Rock Festival in Gävle, which he was headlining with Nightwish and Manowar. On 5 December 2012, Malmsteen released the album Spellbound. 2013 saw the release of Yngwie's official autobiography Relentless.

On 12 June 2014, Malmsteen kicked off his "Guitar Gods 2014 Tour" at the F.M. Kirby Center in Wilkes-Barre, Pennsylvania alongside former Guns N' Roses guitarist Bumblefoot and guitarist Gary Hoey. In February 2015, it was announced that Malmsteen was in the studio working on a new album. In April and May 2016, Malmsteen was one of five guitarists featured on the Generation Axe tour.

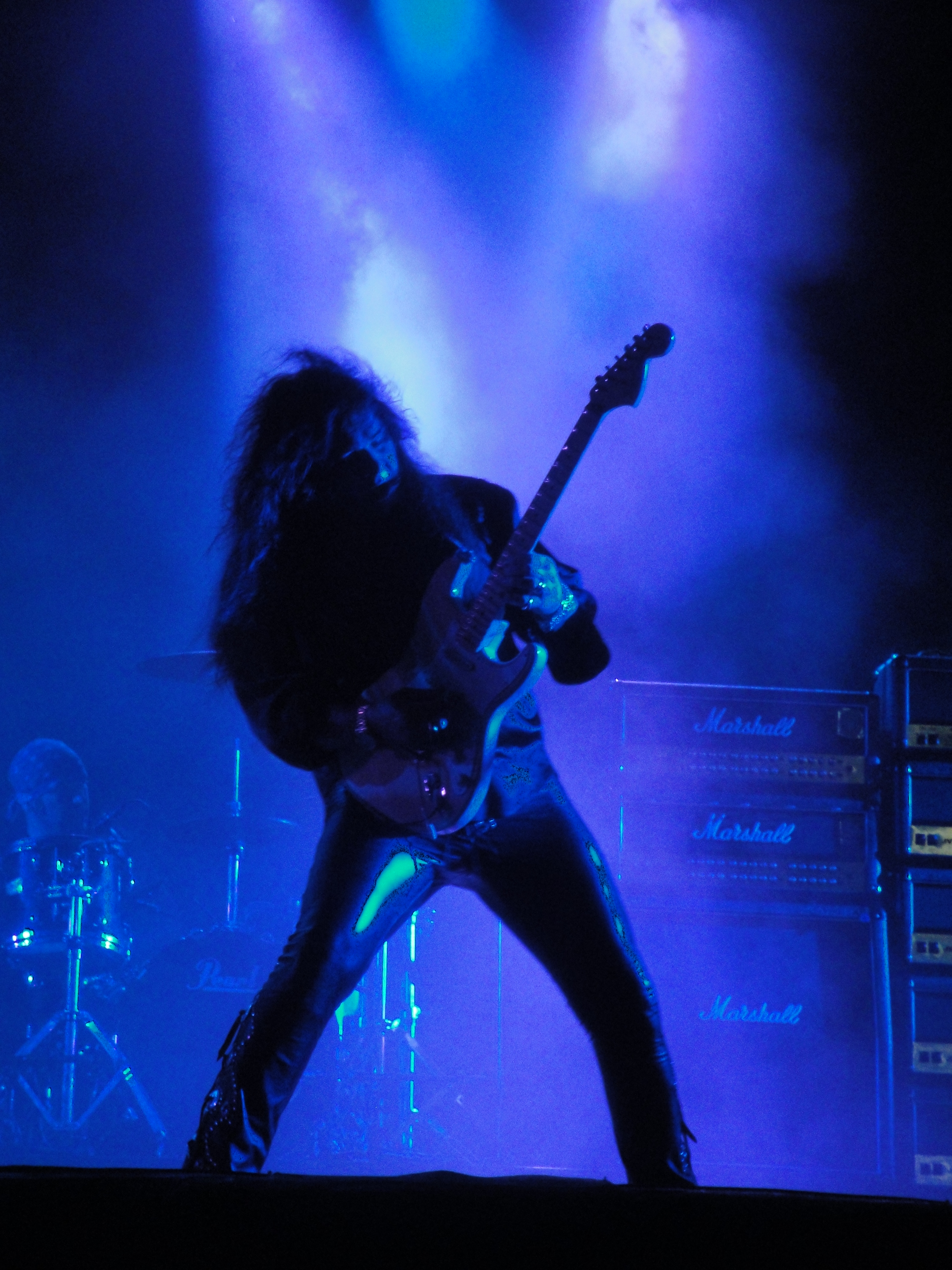
Malmsteen in Gävle, 2012

In 2018, it was announced that Malmsteen had signed with Mascot Records, with a new studio album expected the following year. In 2019, Malmsteen released Blue Lightning, featuring blues rock songs – mainly covers – with Malmsteen's virtuoso playing. As Malmsteen was quoted:

I've been asked to do a blues album for the last 30 years [...] this time I finally said, "Sure, why not? Let's try it!" I just didn't want to be stuck in the standard, pentatonic, play a 12-bar thing. I didn't want to do that.

On 8 May 2021, Yngwie Malmsteen was reported to have launched the Parabellum album and video for the "Paganini-referencing" track "Wolves at the Door". Since COVID-19 restrictions prevented touring, Malmsteen had more time to record the album, and was "clearly delighted with the results."

On 5 August 2026, Malmsteen announced his next studio album, Hell or High Water, set for release on 13 November.

== Personal life ==
Malmsteen was married to Swedish singer Erika Norberg (1991–1992) and was subsequently married to Amber Dawn Landin (1993–1998). Since 1999, he has been married to April Malmsteen. The year before, the two had their first child, Antonio, named after Antonio Vivaldi. The family now resides in Miami Shores, Florida. Malmsteen is a naturalized US Citizen.

Yngwie's father was a military officer and his mother worked for the Swedish Trade Council. They separated only two months after Yngwie was born. Yngwie's mother died in 1987, aged 48. In 1990, Yngwie's grandmother Maud died, and a few months later his brother Björn died in a train accident on Roslagsbanan.

A Ferrari enthusiast, Malmsteen owned a black 1983 308 GTS for 24 years before selling it on eBay, and a red 1962 250 GTO.

In a 2005 issue of Guitar Player magazine, Malmsteen discussed his often-ridiculed behavior, saying that, "I've probably made more mistakes than anybody. But I don't dwell on them. I don't expect people to understand me, because I'm pretty complex, and I think outside the box with everything I do. I've always taken the untraveled path. Obviously, people have their opinions, but I can't get too wrapped up in that, because I know what I can do, and I know what kind of person I am. And I have no control over what anybody says about me. Back in Sweden, I'm 'Mr Personality' in the tabloids, but obviously I can't take that seriously. I know in my heart that if I do the absolute best I can do, maybe ten years from now people may turn around and say, 'he wasn't that bad'."

In August 2009, Time magazine included Malmsteen on its list of the 10 best electric guitar players of all time.

== Equipment ==
=== Yngwie Malmsteen Signature Stratocaster ===
Maple fretboard YJM Stratocasters

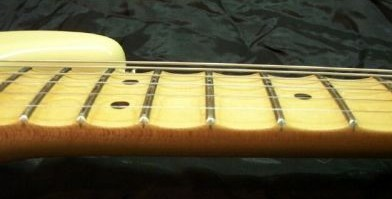
Scalloped maple fretboard on a YJM Strat

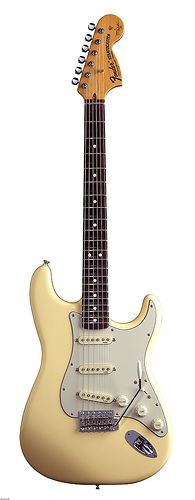
Yngwie Malmsteen Signature Stratocaster with rosewood fretboard

Malmsteen has been a longtime user of Fender Stratocasters with DiMarzio HS3 single-coil pickups "for playing at blistering volume with no hum or screechiness". His most famous Stratocaster is his 1972 blonde Stratocaster, nicknamed "The Duck" because of its yellow finish and the Donald Duck stickers on the headstock. An alternative nickname for this guitar is "Play Loud" due to a sticker that Anders Johansson put on the upper horn of the guitar in Rockshire studios in 1984. Fender made 100 replica copies of this guitar and marketed it as the "Play Loud Guitar". He also has a Fender Yngwie Malmsteen Signature Stratocaster since 1986. It comes in a Vintage White finish with a maple neck, either a maple or rosewood scalloped fretboard and, from 2010, Seymour Duncan STK-S10 YJM "Fury" Model pickups. There is also a signature YJM100 Marshall amplifier, based on the "1959" amplifier range.

=== Other equipment ===
Besides Stratocasters, Malmsteen has played and appeared in ads for non-Fender guitars (like Aria Pro II and Schecter in the early 1980s) and played non-Strat-shaped guitars (like Gibson Flying Vs), early in his career.

Today, for acoustic and nylon string guitars, Malmsteen uses his signature Ovation YM68s. Malmsteen uses light-gauge strings on his guitars, stringing his 25-1/2" scale instruments with his signature string sets by Fender (gauges: .08, .011, .014, .022w, .032, .046 and .08, .011, .014, .026, .036, .048) and pairing them with Dunlop Delrin 500 series guitar picks.

== Band members ==
Current members

- Yngwie Malmsteen – guitars, vocals (1978–1982, 1984–present)
- Nick Z. Marino – keyboards, vocals (2005–2006, 2010–present)
- Emilio Martinez – bass, vocals (2017–present)
- Wyatt Cooper – drums (2024–present)

== Discography ==
=== Steeler ===
Year	Title	Label	US peak chart positions
1983	Steeler	Shrapnel	—
2005	Metal Generation: The Steeler Anthology	Majestic Rock	—

=== Alcatrazz ===
==== Studio albums ====
Year	Title	Album details	US peak chart positions
1983	No Parole from Rock 'n' Roll	Released: 15 October 1983; Label: Polydor	128

==== Live albums ====
Year	Title	US peak chart positions
1984	Live Sentence	133
2010	Live '83	—
2010	No Parole from Rock 'n' Roll Tour Live in Japan 1984.1.28 Audio Tracks (2010 Reissue)	—
2018	Live in Japan 1984 Complete Edition (2018 Reissue)	—
2018	The Official Bootleg Boxset 1983-1986: Live, Demo, Rehearsals (6CD-Boxset)	—

==== Videos ====
- Metallic Live '84 (1984)
- No Parole From Rock'N'Roll Tour - Live In Japan 1984.1.28 (2010)

=== G3 ===
==== Live albums ====
Year	Title	US peak chart positions
2004	G3: Rockin' in the Free World	—

==== Videos ====
- G3: Live in Denver (2004)

=== Yngwie J. Malmsteen's Rising Force ===
==== Studio albums ====
Year	Title	Album details	Peak chart positions					Sales	Certifications
Year	Title	Album details	SWE	AUS	JPN	UK	US	Sales	Certifications
1984	Rising Force	Released: Late 1984; Label: Polydor	14	—	19	—	60	JPN: 18,000	
1985	Marching Out	Released: 30 September 1985; Label: Polydor	9	—	18	—	54	JPN: 22,000	
1986	Trilogy	Released: 4 November 1986; Label: Polydor	18	—	16	—	44	JPN: 40,000	
1988	Odyssey	Released: 8 April 1988; Label: Polydor	7	75	19	27	40	JPN: 42,000	
1990	Eclipse	Released: 20 April 1990; Label: Polydor	12	46	11	43	112	JPN: 63,000	
1992	Fire & Ice	Released: 7 February 1992; Label: Elektra	11	—	1	57	121	JPN: 148,000	RIAJ: Gold
1994	The Seventh Sign	Released: 9 May 1994; Label: Pony Canyon	11	—	2	—	—	JPN: 262,000	RIAJ: Platinum
1995	Magnum Opus	Released: 17 October 1995; Label: Pony Canyon	17	—	9	—	—	JPN: 166,000	
1996	Inspiration (cover album)	Released: 14 October 1996; Label: Pony Canyon	35	—	9	—	—	JPN: 108,000	RIAJ: Gold
1997	Facing the Animal	Released: 23 February 1997; Label: Pony Canyon	39	—	4	—	—	JPN: 105,000	RIAJ: Gold
1998	Concerto Suite for Electric Guitar and Orchestra	Released: 30 June 1998; Label: Pony Canyon	—	—	10	—	—	JPN: 88,000	
1999	Alchemy	Released: 23 November 1999; Label: Pony Canyon	—	—	11	—	—	JPN: 72,000	
2000	War to End All Wars	Released: 7 November 2000; Label: Pony Canyon	—	—	20	—	—	JPN: 32,000	
2002	Attack!!	Released: 15 October 2002; Label: Pony Canyon	—	—	17	—	—	JPN: 28,000	
2005	Unleash the Fury	Released: 26 July 2005; Label: Universal Music	—	—	23	—	—		
2008	Perpetual Flame	Released: 13 October 2008; Label: Rising Force	52	—	15	—	—		
2009	Angels of Love	Released: 10 March 2009; Label: Rising Force	52	—	55	—	—		
2010	Relentless	Released: 23 November 2010; Label: Rising Force	—	—	40	—	—		
2012	Spellbound	Released: 5 December 2012; Label: Rising Force	—	—	40	—	—		
2016	World on Fire	Released: 1 June 2016; Label: Rising Force	—	—	24	—	—		
2019	Blue Lightning (cover album)	Released: 29 March 2019; Label: Mascot	—	—	35	—	80		
2021	Parabellum	Released: 23 July 2021; Label: Music Theories Recordings/Mascot Label Group	—	—	22	—	89		
2026	Hell or High Water	Released: 13 November 2026; Label: Music Theories Recordings/Artone Label Group	—	—	29	—	—		

==== Live albums ====
Year	Title	Peak chart positions			
Year	Title	AUS	JPN	UK	US
1989	Trial by Fire: Live in Leningrad	98	20	65	128
1998	Double Live	—	48	—	—
2002	Concerto Suite for Electric Guitar and Orchestra in E flat minor LIVE with the New Japan Philharmonic	—	—	—	—
2014	Spellbound Live in Tampa	—	—	—	—
2025	Tokyo Live	—	—	—	—

==== Compilations ====
Year	Title	Peak chart positions
Year	Title	JPN
1991	The Yngwie Malmsteen Collection	—
2000	Yngwie J. Malmsteen: The Best of '90–'99	—
2000	Anthology 1994–1999	—
2001	Yngwie Malmsteen Archives	—
2002	The Genesis	94
2004	Instrumental Best Album	—
2009	High Impact	—

==== EP ====
Year	Title	Album details	Peak chart positions
Year	Title	Album details	JPN
1994	I Can't Wait	Released: 21 October 1994; Label: Pony Canyon	25

==== Videos ====
Year	Title	Type
1985	Rising Force: Live '85	Live
1989	Trial by Fire: Live in Leningrad '89	Live
1991	Yngwie Malmsteen	Instruction
1992	Yngwie Malmsteen Collection	MV
1993	Leo Fender Benefit Live	Live
1994	Live at Budokan (LD)/Live in Budokan (2009 DVD Reissue)	Live
1995	Play Loud! The 1st Movement [The Basics]	Instruction
1995	Play Loud! The 2nd Movement [Arpeggio]	Instruction
1995	Play Loud! The 3rd Movement [Classical Styling]	Instruction
1998	Live!! (VHS)/Live Animal (2009 DVD Reissue)	Live
2000	Yngwie Malmsteen Video Clips	MV
2000	Play Loud! "Full Shred"	Instruction
2002	Concerto Suite for Electric Guitar and Orchestra in E Flat Minor Live with the New Japan Philharmonic	Live
2007	Far Beyond The Sun (Rising Force: Live in Japan '85, Trial By Fire: Live in Leningrad '89 & Bonus Features)	Live compilation
2009	Live in Korea	Live
2010	Raw Live	Live compilation
2014	Spellbound Live in Orlando	Live

==== Music Videos ====
- "Island in the Sun" (1983) (with Alcatrazz)
- "Hiroshima Mon Amour" (1983) (with Alcatrazz)
- "I'll See the Light Tonight" (1985)
- "We're Stars" (1986) (with Hear 'N Aid)
- "You Don't Remember, I'll Never Forget" (1986)
- "Heaven Tonight" (1988)
- "Making Love" (1990)
- "Save Our Love" (1990)
- "Bedroom Eyes" (1990)
- "Teaser" (1992)
- "Dragonfly" (1992)
- "Forever One" (1994)
- "The Only One" (1995)
- "Carry On Wayward Son" (Kansas cover) (1996)
- "Alone in Paradise" (1997)
- "Like an Angel" (1997)
- "Hanger 18, Area 51" (1999)
- "Crucify" (2000)

==== Guest appearances ====
Year	Artist	Song	Album	Notes
1986	Hear'n Aid	"Stars"	Hear 'n Aid	
1988	Tone Norum	"Point of No Return"	This Time...	
1990	Erika	"Emergency"	Cold Winter Night	
1991	Various	"Leviathan"	Guitars That Rule The World	
1994	Various	"Speed King"	Smoke on the Water: A Tribute	Vo. Kelly Keeling
1994	Various	"Lazy"	Smoke on the Water: A Tribute	Vo. Joe Lynn Turner
1995	Carmine Appice's Guitar Zeus	"This Time Around"	Carmine Appice's Guitar Zeus	Vo. Doug Pinnick
1995	Various	"Burn"	Black Night: Deep Purple Tribute According To New York	Guitar solo, as Lars Y. Loudamp
1996	Human Clay	"Jealousy"	Human Clay	
1996	Saxon	"Denim & Leather"	The Eagle Has Landed – Part II	
1996	Johansson	"Enigma Suite"	Sonic Winter	
1996	Johansson	"All Opposable Thumbs"	Sonic Winter	
1996	Various	"Keep Yourself Alive"	Dragon Attack (A Tribute To Queen)	Vo. Mark Boals
1997	MVP	"Say A Prayer"	Windows	
1999	Various	"Dream On"	Tribute To Aerosmith – Not The Same Old Song And Dance	Vo. Ronnie James Dio
1999	Various	"Light Up The Sky"	Little Guitars – A Tribute To Van Halen	Vo. Doug Pinnick
2000	Various	"Mr. Crowley"	Bat Head Soup – Tribute To Ozzy	Vo. Tim "Ripper" Owens
2002	Åsa Jinder	"Göksbypolska"	Tro, Hopp & Kärlek – Visor Om Livet	
2003	Derek Sherinian	"The Fury"	Black Utopia	
2003	Derek Sherinian	"Axis of Evil"	Black Utopia	
2003	Various	"Daddy, Brother, Lover, Little Boy"	Influences & Connections – Volume One: Mr. Big	Guitar solo, Vo. Joe Lynn Turner
2005	Radioactive	"Shattered"	Taken	
2005	Violent Storm	"Fire in the Unknown"	Violent Storm/Storm Warning	
2005	Violent Storm	"Pain Is For Me"	Violent Storm/Storm Warning	
2005	DJ Schmolli	"What's This Name For?"	Schnipseljagd Vol. 01	
2006	Various	"Magical Mystery Tour"	Butchering The Beatles – A Headbashing Tribute	Vo. Jeff Scott Soto
2006	Derek Sherinian	"Blood of the Snake"	Blood of the Snake	
2006	Derek Sherinian	"The Monsoon"	Blood of the Snake	
2006	Derek Sherinian	"Prelude To Battle"	Blood of the Snake	
2006	Derek Sherinian	"Viking Massacre"	Blood of the Snake	

== See also ==
- Guitar showmanship
- Shred guitar
- Sweep picking
