= Attack!! =

Studio album by Yngwie Malmsteen
- Released: 15 October 2002
- Recorded: April–June 2002
- Genre: Neoclassical metal, heavy metal
- Length: 64:04
- Label: Steamhammer Records

Yngwie Malmsteen chronology
The Genesis (2002)	Attack!! (2002)	G3: Rockin' in the Free World (2004)

Professional ratings
Review scores
Source	Rating
AllMusic	3/5 stars

Attack!! is the fourteenth studio album by the Swedish guitarist Yngwie Malmsteen, released on 15 October 2002 through Steamhammer records. The album is the first to feature singer Doogie White on lead vocals, along with keyboardist Derek Sherinian.

== Track listing ==
=== US edition ===
All tracks are written by Yngwie Malmsteen, except where specified

No.	Title	Length
1.	"Razor Eater"	3:27
2.	"Rise Up"	4:33
3.	"Valley of Kings"	5:43
4.	"Ship of Fools"	4:16
5.	"Attack!!"	4:25
6.	"Baroque & Roll"	5:56
7.	"Stronghold"	4:17
8.	"Mad Dog"	3:24
9.	"In the Name of God"	3:36
10.	"Freedom Isn't Free"	4:07
11.	"Majestic Blue"	6:03
12.	"Valhalla"	6:44
13.	"Iron Clad"	4:58
14.	"Air" (Malmsteen, Johann Sebastian Bach)	2:36

==== Bonus tracks ====
No.	Title	Writer(s)	Length
15.	"Battlefield"	Malmsteen	3:26
16.	"Dreaming" (live)	Joe Lynn Turner, Malmsteen	9:17

=== Japanese/Korean/US limited edition ===
All tracks are written by Yngwie Malmsteen, except where specified

No.	Title	Length
1.	"Razor Eater"	3:27
2.	"Rise Up"	4:33
3.	"Valley of the Kings"	5:44
4.	"Ship of Fools"	4:16
5.	"Attack!!"	4:25
6.	"Baroque 'n Roll"	5:56
7.	"Stronghold"	4:17
8.	"Mad Dog"	3:24
9.	"In the Name of God"	3:38
10.	"Freedom Isn't Free"	4:08
11.	"Majestic Blue"	6:03
12.	"Valhalla"	6:44
13.	"Touch the Sky"	5:02
14.	"Iron Clad"	4:58
15.	"Air" (Malmsteen, Bach)	2:35

==== Bonus track ====
All tracks are written by Yngwie Malmsteen

No.	Title	Length
16.	"Nobody's Fool"	3:42

== Personnel ==
- Yngwie J. Malmsteen - guitars, bass, lead vocals on "Freedom Isn't Free"
- Doogie White - lead vocals
- Derek Sherinian - keyboards
- Patrick Johansson - drums
