= Spellbound (Yngwie Malmsteen album) =

Studio album by Yngwie Malmsteen
- Released: 5 December 2012
- Genres: Neoclassical metal, heavy metal
- Length: 54:08
- Labels: Rising Force, Universal Music Japan
- Producer: Yngwie Malmsteen

Yngwie Malmsteen chronology
Relentless (2010)	Spellbound (2012)	World on Fire (2016)

Professional ratings
Review scores
Source	Rating
Sputnikmusic	2.5/5

Spellbound is the nineteenth studio album by Swedish guitarist Yngwie Malmsteen, released on 5 December 2012 through his independent label Rising Force Records. Malmsteen played all of the instruments and sang all vocals on this album.

== Background ==
The album was released approximately two years after its predecessor, Relentless, and was issued through Malmsteen's independent record label, Rising Force Records.

The album is notable for Malmsteen performing all the instruments and handling the vocals himself. In addition to guitar and bass, he played drums, keyboards, cello and sitar, while also taking charge of the album's production, recording and mixing. The recording sessions took place at his Studio 308 in Miami, Florida, United States, with engineer Keith Rose assisting with the process.

In a 2013 interview with Premier Guitar, Malmsteen explained that the album's creation had not been planned in advance but had developed naturally from musical inspiration. He recorded music whenever inspiration struck in his studio, eventually selecting material from approximately 100 musical ideas to complete the album. He also stated that most of the tracks were recorded during their first takes, as he preferred preserving the spontaneity and energy of the performances rather than repeatedly recording them.

Musically, Spellbound combines Malmsteen's characteristic neoclassical metal and hard rock styles with elements of blues and classical music. Tracks such as "Let Sleeping Dogs Lie" and "Iron Blues" feature blues-influenced playing, while "Majestic 12 Suite 1, 2 & 3" incorporates classical arrangements featuring the cello. In the interview, Malmsteen explained that the music of Johann Sebastian Bach, Antonio Vivaldi and Niccolò Paganini had long influenced his approach to composition.

Malmsteen described the title track, "Spellbound", as being built around a relatively straightforward rhythm compared with some of the album's other compositions. He also characterised "Majestic 12 Suite 1, 2 & 3" as a piece resembling a small symphony. He emphasised that making music he personally enjoyed was more important to him than catering to the tastes of a particular audience.

== Track listing ==
All tracks are written by Yngwie Malmsteen.

No.	Title	Length
1.	"Spellbound" (Instrumental)	4:29
2.	"High Compression Fugue" (Instrumental)	3:20
3.	"Repent"	3:15
4.	"Let Sleeping Dogs Lie"	4:40
5.	"Majestic 12 Suite 1,2 & 3" (Instrumental)	9:03
6.	"Electric Duet" (Instrumental)	1:34
7.	"Nasca Lines" (Instrumental)	2:56
8.	"Poisoned Minds"	3:04
9.	"God of War" (Instrumental)	7:21
10.	"Iron Blues" (Instrumental)	3:26
11.	"Turbo Amadeus" (Instrumental)	1:12
12.	"From A Thousand Cuts" (Instrumental)	3:24
13.	"Requiem for the Lost Souls" (Instrumental)	6:17

== Personnel ==
- Yngwie Malmsteen – vocals, guitars, bass, keyboards, drums
