= Relentless (Yngwie Malmsteen album) =

Studio album by Yngwie Malmsteen
- Released: 23 November 2010
- Genres: Neoclassical metal, heavy metal
- Length: 68:18
- Labels: Rising Force, Koch
- Producer: Yngwie Malmsteen

Yngwie Malmsteen chronology
High Impact (2009)	Relentless (2010)	Spellbound (2012)

Relentless is the eighteenth studio album by guitarist Yngwie Malmsteen, released on 23 November 2010 through his independent label Rising Force Records. It is his second album with ex-Judas Priest and ex-Iced Earth singer Tim "Ripper" Owens, after 2008's Perpetual Flame.

== Track listing ==
All tracks are written by Yngwie Malmsteen.

No.	Title	Length
1.	"Overture" (instrumental)	0:57
2.	"Critical Mass"	4:09
3.	"Shot Across the Bow" (instrumental)	4:39
4.	"Look at You Now"	5:46
5.	"Relentless" (instrumental)	4:58
6.	"Enemy Within"	5:55
7.	"Knight of the Vasa Order" (instrumental)	6:07
8.	"Caged Animal"	4:49
9.	"Into Valhalla" (instrumental)	4:26
10.	"Tide of Desire"	5:42
11.	"Adagio B Flat Minor Variation" (instrumental)	1:50
12.	"Axe to Grind"	4:46
13.	"Blinded"	4:28
14.	"Cross to Bear" (instrumental)	7:31

Bonus track
No.	Title	Length
15.	"Arpeggios from Hell" (instrumental)	2:18

Professional ratings
Review scores
Source	Rating
AllMusic	3.5/5 stars
Metal Hammer	(6/7)
BW&BK	(7/10)

== Personnel ==
- Yngwie Malmsteen - lead & rhythm guitars, bass, additional keyboards, backing vocals and lead vocals on "Look At You Now"
- Tim "Ripper" Owens - lead vocals
- Nick Z. Marino "Marinovic" - keyboards
- Patrick Johansson - Drums
