= Odyssey (Yngwie Malmsteen album) =

Studio album by Yngwie Malmsteen
- Released: 8 April 1988
- Studios: Cherokee (Hollywood); House of Music (West Orange); Studio D (Austin)
- Genres: Heavy metal; neoclassical metal; hard rock
- Length: 50:42
- Label: Polydor
- Producers: Yngwie Malmsteen, Jeff Glixman, Jim Lewis

Yngwie Malmsteen chronology
Trilogy (1986)	Odyssey (1988)	Trial by Fire: Live in Leningrad (1989)

Singles from Odyssey
- 1. "Heaven Tonight" / "Riot in the Dungeons" Released: 1988

Odyssey is the fourth studio album by guitarist Yngwie Malmsteen, released on 8 April 1988 through Polydor Records. The album reached No. 40 on the US Billboard 200 and remained on that chart for eighteen weeks, as well as reaching the top 50 in five other countries. As of 2021, it remains Malmsteen's highest-charting release on the Billboard 200.

== Background ==
In 1987, Yngwie Malmsteen suffered a serious car accident that significantly disrupted his musical career. In June of that year, while driving his Jaguar E-Type in Woodland Hills, California, United States, he crashed into a tree and remained in a coma for eight days. He sustained severe injuries that left his right arm paralysed and temporarily unable to play guitar. However, after several months of rehabilitation, he eventually resumed playing. Malmsteen began practising guitar again approximately three months after the accident and started recording the album in late 1987.

Following the accident, Malmsteen recruited former Rainbow vocalist Joe Lynn Turner as his new lead singer. Turner's involvement came about through a connection between record label Polydor Records and Malmsteen's manager, Larry Major. Drawing on his experience with Rainbow, Turner helped introduce more accessible melodies and vocal arrangements into Malmsteen's music. Bassist Bob Daisley also participated in the recording, while brothers Jens Johansson and Anders Johansson handled keyboards and drums, respectively.

In a 1988 interview, Malmsteen stated that he had already completed the album's melodies and most of its lyrical concepts before Turner joined the project. Turner primarily contributed lyrics for the verses of individual songs, while Malmsteen took the leading role in songwriting and melody composition. He explained that the album's title, Odyssey, referred to an adventurous journey and reflected both the music's contrasting moods, ranging from dramatic and intense passages to softer sections, and the series of events he had experienced in 1987.

Odyssey showcased a musical direction that placed greater emphasis on melody and vocal harmonies than Malmsteen's previous releases. While retaining his established neoclassical metal style, he incorporated more accessible hard rock elements. Tracks such as "Heaven Tonight", "Dreaming (Tell Me)" and "Hold On" featured catchy choruses and vocal-oriented arrangements. In a later interview, drummer Anders Johansson recalled that the record label had asked Malmsteen to produce more commercially oriented music and that Malmsteen had made certain compromises to accommodate this direction. However, in an interview at the time, Malmsteen explained that he considered himself not only a guitarist but also a songwriter, and that he consistently focused on the melodies and arrangements of his compositions.

Recording and mixing for the album primarily took place at Cherokee Studios in Los Angeles, with some vocals recorded at House of Music in New Jersey. Additional recording sessions were held at Studio D in Austin, Texas, while mixing was handled by Steve Thompson and Michael Barbiero. Malmsteen and Jeff Glixman served as the album's producers.

Odyssey was released on 8 April 1988 through Polydor Records. It was the fourth studio album released under the name Yngwie J. Malmsteen's Rising Force. In later interviews, Malmsteen explained that the album's title and musical arrangements reflected his life at the time, describing the work as a journey progressing through songs ranging from intense to softer compositions.

== Critical reception ==
Professional ratings
Review scores
Source	Rating
AllMusic	2/5 stars
Collector's Guide to Heavy Metal	7/10
Metal Forces	6.5/10

Steve Huey at AllMusic gave Odyssey two stars out of five, calling it "a more subdued, polished collection seemingly designed for mainstream radio airplay", but that it "shows little difference in approach from [Malmsteen's] previous output". He praised Joe Lynn Turner's vocals and Malmsteen's guitar work, but remarked that the latter sounds "constrained and passionless" due in part to his recovery from a near-fatal car accident in 1987.

Gary Sharp-Young of Metal Forces awarded Odyssey a score of 6.5 out of 10. He noted that the album pursued a more commercial direction than Malmsteen's previous releases while keeping the guitarist's playing at the forefront. He particularly praised the energy of "Deja Vu" and the vocal melody of "Crystal Ball", but criticised the reuse of older riffs and ideas in some tracks, as well as the lack of originality in the guitar solos. He also questioned Malmsteen's attempt to pursue a more accessible musical direction while retaining his trademark fast guitar playing. Overall, he considered Odyssey a good album, although not quite a masterpiece.

== Track listing ==
All lyrics are written by Joe Lynn Turner; all music is composed by Yngwie Malmsteen.

No.	Title	Length
1.	"Rising Force"	4:24
2.	"Hold On"	5:12
3.	"Heaven Tonight"	4:07
4.	"Dreaming (Tell Me)"	5:22
5.	"Bite the Bullet" (instrumental)	1:35
6.	"Riot in the Dungeons"	4:26
7.	"Deja Vu"	4:17
8.	"Crystal Ball"	4:56
9.	"Now Is the Time"	4:34
10.	"Faster Than the Speed of Light"	4:30
11.	"Krakatau" (instrumental)	6:06
12.	"Memories" (instrumental)	1:14
Total length:		50:42

== Personnel ==
- Yngwie Malmsteen – guitar, Moog Taurus, bass (tracks 3–7, 10–12), arrangement, producer
- Joe Lynn Turner – vocals (except for tracks 5, 11 & 12)
- Jens Johansson – keyboard
- Anders Johansson – drums
- Bob Daisley – bass (tracks 1, 2, 8, 9)
- Jeff Glixman – engineer, producer
- John Rolio – engineer
- Scott Gordon – assistant engineer, assistant mixing engineer
- Steve Thompson – mixing
- Michael Barbiero – mixing
- George Cowan – assistant mixing engineer
- Jim Lewis – executive producer

== Charts ==
=== Weekly charts ===
Chart performance for Odyssey
Chart (1988)	Peak position
Australian Albums (Kent Music Report)	75
Dutch Albums (Album Top 100)	27
European Albums (Eurochart Hot 100)	40
German Albums (Offizielle Top 100)	50
Japanese Albums (Oricon)	19
Norwegian Albums (VG-lista)	10
Swedish Albums (Sverigetopplistan)	7
Swiss Albums (Schweizer Hitparade)	17
UK Albums (Official Charts)	27
US Billboard 200	40
US Top Current Album Sales (Billboard)	40

== Certifications and sales ==
Certifications and sales for Odyssey
Region	Certification	Certified units/sales
Japan	—	42,000
Sweden (GLF)	Gold	50,000^{^}
^{^} Shipments figures based on certification alone.
