= Mats Olausson =

- Born: April 17, 1961; Gothenburg, Sweden
- Died: 18 February 2015 (aged 53) Rayong, Thailand
- Genres: Power metal, progressive metal, symphonic metal
- Occupations: Musician, songwriter, producer
- Instrument: Keyboards
- Years active: c. 1980–2015

Mats Johan Olausson (17 April 1961 – 18 February 2015) was a Swedish keyboard player known from bands such as Yngwie Malmsteen, Ark, Evil Masquerade, Kamelot, Jean Beauvoir, John Norum, and many others. Later in his life, he lived in Thailand where he was active as a musician, composer and producer. Olausson played Korg Trinity Pro Tri PBS and Yamaha SY-99, SY-77, CS-80. In the studio he also used a grand piano, Hammond B-3 or C-3. He was born in Gothenburg, Sweden.

On 19 February 2015, Olausson's body was found in a hotel in Thailand, having died at least 24 hours earlier. He was 53^{S}.

== Notes ==
S. Although it has been reported that he was 54 at death, he was more likely aged 53 due to multiple sources stating his date of birth was 17 April 1961.
