= Dying to Live (13 album) =

Studio album by Joel Hoekstra's 13
- Released: October 16, 2015
- Genre: Hard rock, heavy metal
- Length: 48:42
- Label: Frontiers Records
- Producer: Joel Hoekstra

Dying to Live is the first full-length studio album by Joel Hoekstra's 13. It was released on October 16, 2015 by Frontiers Records.

American guitarist Joel Hoekstra is known as a member of the band Whitesnake and for being a former member of Night Ranger. He also contributed to the works of Trans-Siberian Orchestra and to the Broadway musical Rock of Ages. The album was originally announced as a collaboration of Hoekstra with vocalist Russell Allen (Symphony X, Adrenaline Mob) on lead vocals, Vinny Appice (ex-Dio and ex-Black Sabbath) on drums and Tony Franklin (ex-Blue Murder, The Firm and ex-Whitesnake) on bass, with vocalist Jeff Scott Soto (of Talisman, W.E.T., Takara, Yngwie Malmsteen's Rising Force, Humanimal, Soul SirkUS, Axel Rudi Pell and Trans-Siberian Orchestra fame) on backing vocals. Later, Joel Hoekstra decided to record more tracks with Soto on lead vocals and add keyboard player Derek Sherinian to record a few solos.

The album also features guest appearances by Toby Hitchcock (Pride of Lions) and Chloe Lowery (Trans-Siberian Orchestra).

== Track listing ==
All music and lyrics written by Joel Hoekstra, except Changes, lyrics by Russell Allen

No.	Title	Vocalist	Length
1.	"Say Goodbye to the Sun"	Russell Allen	3:23
2.	"Anymore"	Russell Allen	4:47
3.	"Until I Left You"	Jeff Scott Soto	4:27
4.	"Long for the Days"	Russell Allen	5:37
5.	"Scream"	Jeff Scott Soto, Toby Hitchcock	4:24
6.	"Never Say Never"	Russell Allen	3:58
7.	"Changes"	Russell Allen	4:25
8.	"The Only Way to Go"	Jeff Scott Soto	4:48
9.	"Dying to Live"	Russell Allen, Jeff Scott Soto	4:12
10.	"Start Again"	Jeff Scott Soto	3:48
11.	"What We Believe"	Jeff Scott Soto, Chloe Lowery	5:53
12.	"Never Want" (bonus track on Japanese edition)	Jeff Scott Soto	4:29
13.	"Kill or Be Killed" (bonus track for Digital Download))	Russell Allen	4:29

== Personnel ==
- Joel Hoekstra - guitar, backing vocals
- Russell Allen (Symphony X, Adrenaline Mob, Allen-Lande, Trans-Siberian Orchestra) - lead and backing vocals
- Jeff Scott Soto (Talisman, W.E.T., ex-Yngwie Malmsteen, Trans-Siberian Orchestra) - lead and backing vocals
- Vinny Appice (ex-Dio, ex-Heaven & Hell, ex-Black Sabbath) - drums
- Tony Franklin (ex-Blue Murder, ex-The Firm, ex-Whitesnake) - bass

Guest musicians

- Toby Hitchcock (Pride of Lions) - lead and backing vocals on track 5, backing vocals on track 8
- Chloe Lowery (Trans-Siberian Orchestra) - lead vocals on track 11
- Derek Sherinian (Black Country Communion, Planet X, ex-Dream Theater, ex-Yngwie Malmsteen) - keyboards
- Charlie Zeleny - percussion
- Dave Eggar – cello
