= Swedish Erotica =

Swedish rock band

Swedish Erotica was a Swedish rock band founded in 1985 and disbanded in 1996. The same members also played in the '90s in the cover band Double Trouble. Former members of Swedish Erotica have played with Yngwie Malmsteen, TNT, Vinnie Vincent, Treat, Black Ingvars, Shotgun Messiah, John Norum, Talisman and King Diamond.

== History ==
=== Prehistory ===
The band was formed in early 1985 by guitarists and former members of the band Trafalgar Magnus "Manko" Axx (Axelsson, guitar) and Anders Allhage (best known as Andy La Rocque, guitarist of King Diamond since 1985 and who also played briefly with Death and Megadeth). Ken "Ulf" Sandin (bass). They joined forces with Dag Ingebrigtsen, a former vocalist of the Norwegian band TNT, bassist Ulf "Ken" Sandin and drummer Dennis Nybratt. This line-up played on a Norwegian album of Christmas themed rock songs with various vocalists: "The Grønne Glitrende 3 Og Dag". In the summer of 1985, Allhage left for King Diamond and Nybratt (later in Steelwings) left the band around the same time. They were replaced by Jamie Borger from Treat on drums and Dan Stomberg from Madison on guitar. This line-up recorded some demos with Allhage singing and informally used the name "Swedish Beauty" but was never able to secure a record deal. Magnus Axx did not give up, changed the band name and hired new musicians.

=== Formation and early career ===
The next incarnation of Swedish Erotica formed in 1987 with members Magnus Axx and Morgan Le Fay (Morgan Jensen) on guitar together with bassist Johnny D'Fox (Jonas Tångström) and drummer Pete Sanders (Petter Svärd). They recorded a demo with Göran Edman as session singer, a former member of Madison who sang on two of their albums, and for a brief period in 1985 Edman fronted Vinnie Vincent Invasion between Robert Fleischman and Mark Slaughter. Edman soon left the band to sing in former Europe guitarist John Norum's solo project, where he sang on the album Total Control (1987). Later, Edman sang for Yngwie Malmsteen and on the early demos with former Malmsteen bassist Marcel Jacob's band Talisman.

=== Record deal and debut album ===
After living in Los Angeles in 1988, where they hung out with among others Kee Marcello and Stevie Nicks and met with several record companies, eventually Swedish Erotica, now only consisting of guitarists Axx and Le Fay and bassist D'Fox were signed to Virgin Records Swedish office, thanks to A&R representative Donna Simmons, based on the strength of the band's demos with Edman singing. Towards the end of the year the band had hired drummer BC Strike (Bjarne Johansson, ex-Zanity) and recorded demos in Tuff Studios with BC Strike's former bandmate from Zanity, Tony Niva, singing. A single, "Downtown" was also released with this line-up.

In early 1989 the band recorded a demo in Norway with producer Ole Evenrude. Mats Levén of the band Capricorn contributed background vocals, and when Niva's AOR-oriented vocals didn't work out, he was asked by Evenrude about why he was not the lead singer of the band. Levén told him that he had declined the offer last year but was now actually interested in fronting the band.

The debut album "Swedish Erotica" came out in 1989 with Levén singing and former frontman Tony Niva featured on background vocals. The ballad "Hollywood Dreams" was originally written by British songwriter Jimmy Scott for Bonnie Tyler but never released. Videos for the album's first two singles "R'n'R City" and "Young Wild & Free" were filmed and the videos played on MTV. Thanks to this the band got more attention than many other artists signed by Virgin Scandinavia. Second single, "Wild Young & Free," reached high on the charts but the album was not available in the stores for two months when demand peaked due to a pressing factory strike, which led to reduced sales and lack of success for the band.

After numerous gigs in and around their hometown, among other the clubs Alexis and White Corner and Frölunda Culture House a UK tour followed, which included a gig at the Astoria in London for 700-800 people, even before the album was released in the UK. After touring for their debut album, the band returned to the studio in the spring of 1990 to record some demos for a second studio album. Virgin evaluated the material but found it lacking material similar to the first two singles, which were written by the album's producer Ole Evenrude.

=== Member replacement and cover bands ===
About the same time Jamie Borger, who had played in the band's first version and now was a member of the far more successful Swedish band Treat, informed Levén that his band was looking for a new singer. Levén felt that Virgin did not anticipate a successful career for Swedish Erotica, and he also wanted to move to Treat's hometown of Stockholm, so he began to consider leaving the band. He discussed with a manager at the Virgin that he wanted to leave the band and was told that the label was more interested in him than the band and he was offered a solo project. But the singer decided to leave the label and join the established Treat, where he sang on their self-titled album in 1992, while Swedish Erotica's first attempt at a follow-up album remained unreleased.

Bjarne was replaced by Jonas Olsson on drums while Levén was replaced by former Slobobans Undergång singer Anders Möller, who previously had replaced Göran Edman on vocals in Madison and also sang in an Ozzy Osbourne cover band Crazy Train. Later Jonas Tångström was replaced on bass, first by Terry Barajas who later became the drummer in Abysmal Dawn and then by a returning Ken Sandin, a former member of bands Alien and Da Vinci. During this period, the same members played around Gothenburg in the cover band Double Trouble, covering songs by, among others Guns N' Roses, Poison, Nirvana, Pearl Jam and Magnus Uggla.

1993 Bjarne Johansson played as a guest musician in a new version of Shotgun Messiah with the stage name "BJ", and abandoned thus Swedish Erotica, and was replaced by a returning Jamie Borger, most recently Treat but also the very person who earlier had persuaded Levén to leave the band in favor of Treat.

=== Second album and split ===
1995, with a new contract with a small company Empire Records, Swedish Erotica finally released a second album called Blindman's Justice, recorded in Bauhaus Studios in Gothenburg and mixed by Michael Ilbert. After the album was released frontman Möller had great success with his other band, pop-rockers Black Ingvars, topping the Swedish album charts and touring successfully. This and the general musical climate dominated by grunge and alternative rock led to the Swedish Erotica finally disbanding in 1996.

=== Recent events – the third album ===
The former frontman Mats Levén has participated in several projects and is one of the most established singers in the Swedish metal scene. Following his time in Treat, he was involved in AB/CD, a parody of AC/DC and released the album Cut the Crap! 1995. Later bands include Abstract Algebra, At Vance, Fatal Force, Therion and many others. 2012 Leven briefly fronted Candlemass after they got rid of former front man Robert Lowe. 2005, the German company MTM Music released a compilation by Swedish Erotica - Too Daze Gone.

Morgan Jensen moved on to a successful career as a writer in film and television, Axx operated until early 2019 one of the most popular rock clubs in Sweden, Sticky Fingers in Gothenburg, while Möller and Sandin remained musicians in various constellations over the years. Axx is also credited on one Motörhead album as one of the few outside writers ever to receive a songwriting credit together with the band on one song, "Civil War" on the "Overnight Sensation" album and was also offered by drummer Mikkey Dee to join Motörhead as replacement for guitarist Wurzel.

The band's third album "Too Daze Gone" contains 8 songs with Levén that were meant for the second album. There are also 8 old demos recorded at the beginning of the band's career, different sessions from 1986 to 1988 before they were signed. Three of the songs are from the demo that gave them the recording contract with Virgin. Levén is however credited as the only lead vocalist on the album.

A one-off reunion was announced for the 2024 Sweden Rock Festival with the line-up of Levén, Axx, Le Fay, Sandin and Borger. In August 2024 the band played their second show after the reunion, at the Swedish festival Skogsröjet.

Anders Möller died from cancer on 18 January 2026, at the age of 63.

== Discography ==
- Swedish Erotica (1989) – set list:

Side A: "Rock 'n roll City" (4.25); "Love on the Line" (4:19); "We're Wild, Young and Free" (4:43); "Hollywood Dreams" (4:26); "Love Hunger" (5:01) Side B: "Love Me or Leave Me" (4:27); "Downtown" (3:55); "She Drives Me Crazy" (3:31); "Loaded Gun" (3:59); "Rip It Off" (4:24); "Break the Walls" (4:38).

- Blindman's Justice (1995) – now with Anders Möller (also in Black-Ingvars) on vocals. Track listing: "White Sister"; "Heaven, Hell or Hollywood"; "Blindman's Justice"; Too Good to Be True"; "King of Pain"; "Blue Movies"; "Back in the Saddle"; "Sweetest of Sins"; "Rough Enough"; "Show a Little Lace"; "Satisfied".
- Too Daze Gone ...; (2005) – set list: "Down 2 Bizniz"; "Skin On Skin"; "Fire With Fire"; "Too Daze Gone"; " Muscle In Motion"; "Show a Little slip"; "Blue Movies"; "Terri" and the bonus demos "Break The Walls" (1987); "Roll Away the Stone" (1987); "Can You Stand The Heat" (1988); "Terri" (1987); "Goodbye to Romance" (1986); "Open Arms" (1986); "Love On The Line" (1986); "Loaded gun".
- Swedish Erotica Remaster (August 2007) – remastered re-release of first album with a number of different versions of the more old songs. Track listing: "Rock and Roll City"; "Love On The Line"; "We're Wild, Young And Free"; "Hollywood Dreams"; "Love Hunger"; "Love Me Or Leave Me"; "Downtown"; "She Drives Me Crazy"; "Loaded Gun"; "Rip It Off"; "Break The Walls"; "Hollywood Dreams" (Acoustic Version); "Downtown" (Toni Niva Version); "Rock and Roll City" (Deep Hannover mix); "Loaded Rap" (Rap Version Of "Loaded Gun").

== Members at dissolution ==
- Magnus Axx (guitar, 1985–1996, 2024)
- Anders Möller (vocals, 1990–96; died 2026)
- BC Strike (Bjarne Johansson) (drums, 1988–93, 1995–96)
- Morgan Le Fay (Morgan Jensen) (guitar, 1988–96, 2024)
- Ulf Ken (Ken Sandin) (bass, 1985–88, 1993–96, 2024)

== Former members ==
- Andy La Rocque Anders Allhage (guitar, vocals 1985)
- Dag Ingebrigtsen (vocals, 1985–86)
- Goran Edman (vocals, 1988)
- Tony Niva (vocals, 1988–1989)
- Mats Levén "Matthew S. Leven" (vocals, 1989–91, 2024)
- Dan Stomberg (guitar, 1985–87)
- Jonas Tångström "Johnny D. Fox" (bass, 1988–1990)
- Terry Barajas (bass, 1991–92)
- Dennis Nybratt (drums, 1985)
- Jamie Borger (drums, 1985–87, 1993–94, 2024)
- Pete Sanders "Petter Svärd" (drums, 1988)
- Jonas Olsson (drums, 1994–95)
