= Nine Lives (Last Autumn's Dream album) =

Studio album by Last Autumn's Dream
- Released: 14 December 2011
- Genre: Hard rock
- Label: Marquee Avalon

Last Autumn's Dream chronology
Yes	Nine Lives

Nine Lives is the ninth studio album by hard rock band Last Autumn's Dream released by Marquee Avalon in Japan on December 14, 2011, and scheduled to be released in Europe on January 20, 2012.

It was rated an 8 out of 10 by Metal Temple Magazine.

== Track listing ==
1. In A Perfect World
2. Nine Lives
3. Is This Just Another Heartache
4. Merry-Go-Round
5. Golden Cage
6. All I Can Think Of
7. Megalomania
8. The Last To Know
9. Angel Eyes
10. We Never Said Goodbye
11. Waited A Long Time (Bonus Track)
12. Don't Let Love Fade Away

== Additional information ==
'The Last to know' with Jeff Scott Soto and 'Angel Eyes', a duet with Jenny Redenkvist and Waited A Long Time as Bonus Track were included in this recording.

== Personnel ==
- Mikael Erlandsson - lead vocals and keyboards
- Andy Malecek - guitar
- Nalley Pahlsson − bass
- Jamie Borger − drums

Guest Musicians:

- Jeff Scott Soto
- Jenny Redenkvist
