= Last Autumn's Dream =

Hard rock band formed in 2002

- Origin: Sweden
- Genre: Hard rock
- Years active: 2002−present
- Label: Escape Music
- Members: Mikael Erlandsson; Peter Söderström; Jamie Borger; Nalle Påhlsson; Ulf Wahcberg
- Past members: John Levén; Ian Haugland; Mic Michaeli; Marcel Jacob; Thomas Lassar; Andy Malecek

Last Autumn's Dream is a hard rock band formed in 2002 by vocalist and keyboardist Mikael Erlandsson from Sweden and guitarist Andy Malecek from the German hard rock band Fair Warning.

When searching for other band members, they asked bassist John Levén, drummer Ian Haugland and keyboardist Mic Michaeli, all from the band Europe, if they were interested to be part of this new musical project and since that moment the band began working on their self-titled debut album, which was released in 2003.

By the time they began working on their second album, II, Europe had reunited, and Last Autumn's Dream had to replace Levén, Haugland and Michaeli with Marcel Jacob (Talisman), Jamie Borger (Talisman, Treat) and Thomas Lassar (Crystal Blue), respectively. II was released in 2005.

Thomas Lassar left the band after II, paring the band down to a quartet. The band then released the albums Winter in Paradise in 2006 and Saturn Skyline in 2007.

On June 6, 2007, the band released their first greatest hits album, Impressions: The Very Best of LAD, an exclusive released for the Japanese market. The band performed at the United Forces of Rock festival in Ludwigsburg, Germany on September 30, 2007 alongside Joe Lynn Turner, Stan Bush, White Wolf, Soul Doctor, Human Zoo and Danger Danger.

The band released their fifth studio album, Hunting Shadows in Japan on February 22, 2008 as well as the live album Live in Germany 2007.

The sixth album release from Last Autumn's Dream is called Dreamcatcher was released for Japan on December 24, 2008 and was out in Europe on January 26, 2009.

On July 21, 2009, Marcel Jacob committed suicide. He was 45 years old. Nalle Påhlsson was brought in as his replacement.

The band's seventh and eighth albums, A Touch of Heaven and Yes, were both released in 2010.

On December 14, 2011, the band released for Japan market their ninth studio album called Nine Lives. In this recording were included The Last to know with Jeff Scott Soto, Angel Eyes, a duet with Jenny Redenkvist and Waited A Long Time as Bonus Track.

== Band members ==
=== Current members ===
- Mikael Erlandsson - Vocals and keyboards
- Peter Söderström - Guitar
- Jamie Borger − Drums
- Nalle Påhlsson − Bass
- Ulf Wahlberg − Keyboard

=== Former members ===
- John Levén - Bass
- Mic Michaeli - Keyboards
- Ian Haugland - Drums
- Thomas Lassar - Keyboards
- Marcel Jacob − Bass
- Andy Malecek - Guitar

== Discography ==
=== Studio albums ===
- Last Autumn's Dream (2003)
- II (2005)
- Winter in Paradise (2006)
- Saturn Skyline (2007)
- Hunting Shadows (2008)
- Dreamcatcher (2009)
- A Touch of Heaven (2010)
- Yes (2010)
- Nine Lives (2011)
- Ten Tangerine Tales (2012)
- Level Eleven (2014)
- Again & Again (2015)
- Paintings (2016)
- In Disguise (2017) (Cover album)
- Fourteen (2018)
- Secret Treasures (2018)

=== Live albums ===
- Live in Germany 2007 (2008)

=== Compilation albums ===
- Impressions: The Very Best of LAD (Japanese market) (2007)
- Impressions: The Very Best of LAD (German market) (2008)
- Platform: 10th Anniversary Best (2013)

=== Various Artist compilations ===
- Various Artist - Fireworks Magazine Number issue 27 2CD Sampler (2007)
- Various Artist - Fireworks Magazine Number issue 35 2CD Sampler (2009)

== Promo videos ==
- I Don't Want to Hurt You from Winter in Paradise.
