= 7 (Talisman album) =

Studio album by Talisman
- Released: 20 October 2006
- Recorded: 2006
- Studio: XTC Studios and Mahatma Gandhi Location, Stockholm, Sweden, The Hampton, Northridge, California (vocals)
- Genre: Hard rock
- Length: 45:35
- Label: Frontiers
- Producer: Marcel Jacob, Jeff Scott Soto

Talisman chronology
Five Men Live (2005)	7 (2006)

7 is the 7th and last studio album by hard rock band Talisman released on 20 October 2006 on Frontiers Records.

It was recorded under the working title of "BAR", which stood for "Bitter-Angry-Resentful", basically a joke referring to the guys’ outlook on certain life events. It was dropped in the end in favour of the more immediate "7". "7" is an album that encompasses several music styles, but keeping intact the elements of the Talisman trademark rhythms.

== Marcel Jacob talking about the release of "7" ==
The Swedish bass player and songwriter Marcel Jacob (ex-Yngwie Malmsteen, Europe) teamed once again with US vocalist Jeff Scott Soto (formally of Yngwie Malmsteen, Soul Sirkus and Journey), drummer Jamie Borger (Treat) and guitarist Fredrik Åkesson (currently a member of Opeth) to give birth to the recording.

According to Jacob: "I am very pleased with the result, more so than I've been in a while. There are a number of tracks that came out really well and I am quite curious as to what the response will be. As a songwriter I tried to write this time more for other ears than mine, trying to perceive what others could have liked from what we have been doing before... Also this time we tried to go for some ballads and this was a sort of new challenge for us."

"It's the same old people: JSS, Freddie, Jamie, and I. This time I've been handling all guitars except leads, as well as doing an amazing amount (for me) of keyboards. The album was mixed by Pontus Norgren, he is also guesting as guitar player on one track."

== Track listing ==
All songs were written by Marcel Jacob and Jeff Scott Soto except where it noted.

1. "Falling" - 3:56
2. "Nowhere Fast" - 4:02
3. "Rhyme or Reason" - 4:34
4. "End of the Line" - 4:01
5. "The 1 I'm Living 4" - 4:21
6. "On My Way" - 3:46
7. "Forevermore" - 3:42
8. "Succumb 2 My Desire" - 3:54
9. "Shed a Tear Goodbye" (Jamie Borger/Jeff Scott Soto) - 4:09
10. "Troubled Water" - 4:40
11. "Back 2 the Feeling" - 4:33
12. "Final Curtain (Bonus Japanese)"

== Personnel ==
=== Talisman ===
- Jeff Scott Soto – vocals
- Marcel Jacob – bass
- Fredrik Åkesson – guitar
- Jamie Borger – drums

=== Guest ===
- Pontus Norgren – guitar on "Final Curtain"
