= Planet Us =

American rock band (2002–2003)

- Origin: Los Angeles, United States
- Genres: Hard rock
- Years active: 2002–2003
- Members: Sammy Hagar; Neal Schon; Michael Anthony; Deen Castronovo; Joe Satriani

Planet Us (pronounced Planet-uss) was a short-lived supergroup that formed in 2002 with Sammy Hagar on lead vocals, Neal Schon on guitar, Michael Anthony on bass, and Deen Castronovo on drums. The band later recruited a fifth member—famed guitarist Joe Satriani—when their original choice, Slash, turned them down. The band's name Planet Us has been alternatively spelled as Planet US in various publications.

== History ==
In 2002, with some down time between Journey albums and Van Halen still unreformed at this point, the members decided to kickstart a separate project. The band was announced in early 2002 yet Schon and Castronovo were still recording and subsequently toured with Journey that summer, while Hagar was touring with David Lee Roth in the successful 'Sans Halen' tour. The new group then planned to reconvene in the Fall but the initial recording sessions scheduled in San Francisco were again delayed until January 2003 while Castronovo recovered from an illness.

In the end, only two songs were written and recorded under the Planet Us name: "Vertigo" and "Peeping Through a Hole" and neither was officially released by the band itself. "Vertigo" was originally intended for the first Spider-Man movie; however, it was turned down by Sony (correctly, says Sammy) for being "too f—in' heavy!" "Peeping Through a Hole," a very dark song about an abused child, was later re-recorded by another of Neal Schon's projects, Soul SirkUS with Jeff Scott Soto on vocals, and released as "Peephole" on the Soul SirkUS "World Play" CD.

In an interview from late 2005, Neal Schon described how material he had originally written for Planet Us ended up on the Soul SirkUS project instead: "There was a couple songs that did end up on Journey's Generations that I wrote during the same time period that I wrote that material like "Faith in the Heartland" and "Out of Harm's Way". They were all written in the same month. I wrote about twenty songs that month and it was all going to be for the project that I was doing with Sammy Hagar. ... I wanted to do something with this material that I had written with Planet Us. So, I decided to re-group and put it out with some guys that I think are 'happening'. And that's what I did. I sent Jeff (Scott Soto) all my material and he wrote all the vocals. When he got eight songs done, we went into the studio and knocked it out in a couple of days."

The band only appeared live four times, the first being at the 25th annual Bammies (aka the California Music Awards) on Saturday, April 27, 2002 in Oakland, California. After Sammy Hagar took the stage playing three songs with his band the Waboritas he announced a few friends and Schon, Anthony, and Castronovo took the stage. They then played "Vertigo" and "Peeping Through a Hole" publicly for the first time. Hagar and Anthony had performed at the Bammies years earlier as Los Tres Gusanos.

The second and third appearances also occurred when Schon, Anthony, and Castronovo joined Hagar on tour, this time at the Hard Rock Hotel in Las Vegas on May 17 and May 18, 2002. Both nights they ended Hagar's headlining show with performances of their only two songs.

Their fourth and final performance occurred on March 12, 2003 on the syndicated radio show Rockline hosted by Bob Coburn. Sammy introduced the band's recently expanded line-up with Joe Satriani on guitar and after briefly explaining the origin of the 'side project' they played "Vertigo" to end the night.

Planet Us never finished their planned album likely due to the busy nature of its members at the time. Hagar and Anthony returned to Van Halen with much fanfare in 2004 and subsequently went on a world tour. In frustration, Schon and Castronovo took the material written for Planet Us and formed Soul SirkUS with Soto, touring the results before returning to their regular duties in Journey.

== Epilogue ==
In 2008, Hagar released the songs "Vertigo" (now renamed to "Psycho Vertigo") and "Peephole" on his Cosmic Universal Fashion album. In the liner notes Hagar states: "Neal Schon has been a friend for years. We have talked about working together but the time had never been quite right. A few years ago we finally wrote a couple of songs, "Psycho Vertigo" and "Peephole", and decided to go into the studio and record. I called Michael Anthony to play his bass while Neal enlisted Deen Castronovo to play drums. I had a home studio in my basement where we worked out these two tracks. We were really excited about the way things were going and had already decided to call ourselves Planet Us. Then the phone rang and the Van Hagar reunion was an idea that was just too irresistible to pass up. I am happy these tracks are finally coming out."

Planet Us was the second project that Hagar and Schon formed, the first being the short-lived Hagar Schon Aaronson Shrieve from the mid-1980s. Although it seems unlikely that they will regroup and produce a proper album, Neal Schon has left the door open stating "If he (Hagar) calls me up and says 'Schon – let's go'. I'm gone and it'll be fun."

Satriani, Hagar and Anthony would later join forces for another band named Chickenfoot; that band formed in 2009.
