= Shadows in the Night (disambiguation) =

Shadows in the Night is the 36th studio album by American singer-songwriter Bob Dylan.

Shadows in the Night may also refer to:

== Film ==
- Shadows in the Night (1944 film), a film starring Crime Doctor, written by Eric Taylor
- Shadows in the Night (1946), a chapter of the Chick Carter, Detective film serial
- Shadows in the Night (1950 film), a drama directed by Eugen York

== Literature ==
- Bats: Shadows in the Night (1997), a children's book by Diane Ackerman

== Music ==
- "Senke u noći" ("Shadows in the Night"), an instrumental track from Slomljena Stakla
- "Shadows in the Night", a song by Cristiana Cucchi as Princess F.
- "Shadows in the Night", a song by Iron Cross from Live for Now!
- "Shadows in the Night", a song by Takara from Perception of Reality
- "Shadows in the Night", a song by The Quests, written by R. Fritzen, from Highs in the Mid-Sixties, Volume 5 (1966)
- "Shadows in the Night", a song by Larry Weir
- "Shadows in the Night" (1984), a song by White Wolf (band)
