= Fredrik Åkesson =

Swedish heavy metal guitarist (born 1972)

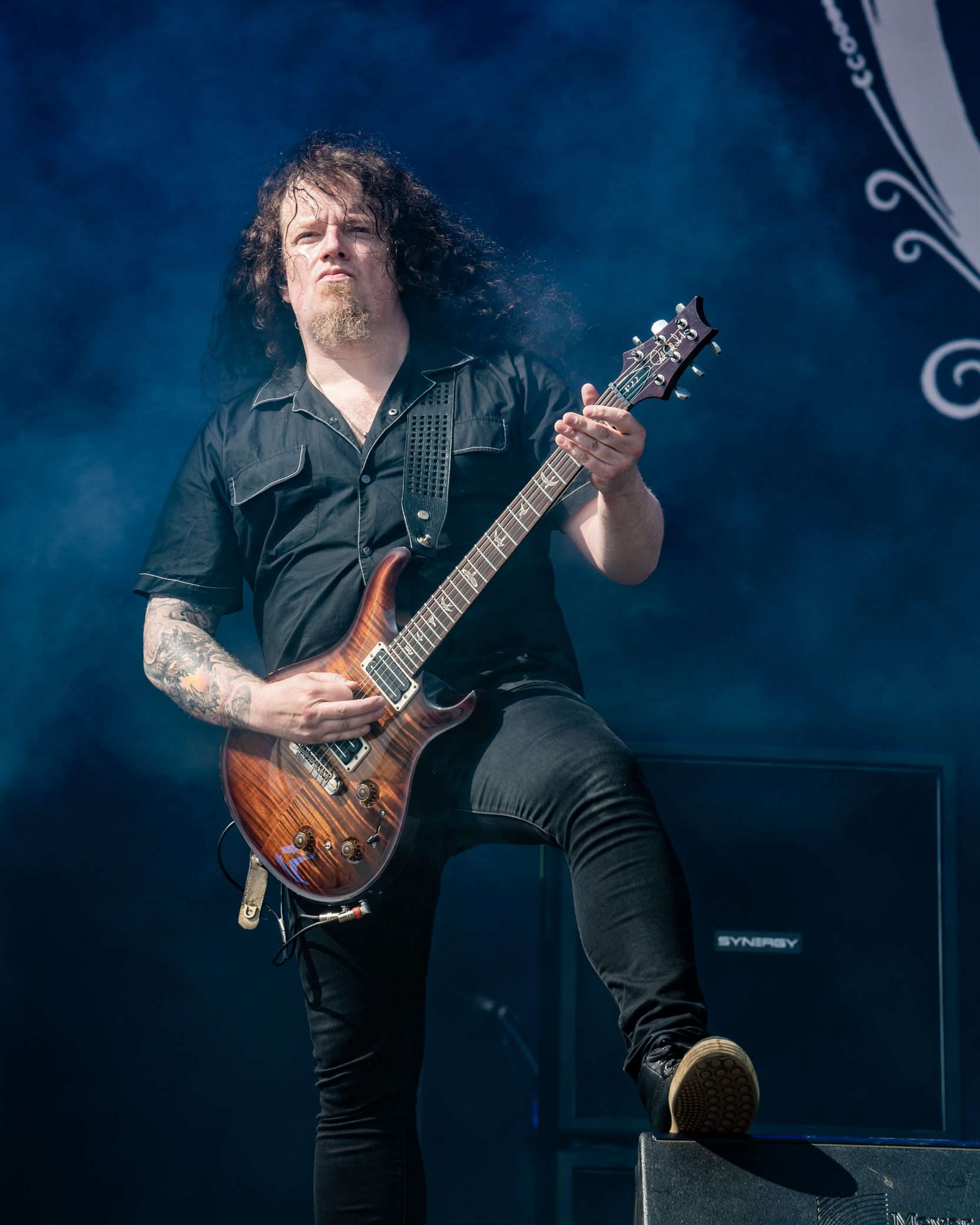
- Åkesson with Opeth in 2024

Background information
- Also known as: Kulle
- Born: 18 July 1972 (age 53)
- Origin: Stockholm, Sweden
- Genres: Progressive death metal, death metal, progressive metal, progressive rock, doom metal, hard rock
- Occupations: Musician, songwriter
- Instrument: Guitar
- Years active: 1992–present
- Member of: Opeth, Krux
- Formerly of: Talisman, Arch Enemy

Karl Fredrik Henrik Åkesson (born 18 July 1972) is a Swedish heavy metal guitarist. He is a current member of Opeth and is also active in Krux, Monsters of Metal, and Talisman. He also recorded three studio albums with Ghost.

== Biography ==
Åkesson has been playing guitar since the age of 12. His early musical influences include Michael Schenker, Uli Jon Roth, Yngwie Malmsteen, John Norum, Gary Moore, and George Lynch. Marcel Jacob, founder of Talisman, held auditions in 1992 to find a new guitar player after Jason Bieler left them to play with Saigon Kick; the 19-year-old Åkesson was selected for the position. He spent almost four years with Talisman and after five records decided to leave them for a heavier outfit. Åkesson, Mats Levén, John Levén, and Rickard Evensand formed a band called Eyeball who would later change their name to Southpaw. In 1998, Åkesson appeared on two albums: Southpaw's debut album and Naïve by Clockwise. He also recorded a version of Journey's classic "Send Her My Love" with Clockwise for a tribute album that was never released.

Åkesson returned to record and tour with Talisman. They worked on two new studio efforts: Cats and Dogs (2003) and 7 (2006) plus a live album called Five Men Live (2005) which was released on DVD as World's Best Kept Secret. In 2004, Åkesson filled in for Tiamat guitarist Thomas Petersson on tour and was featured in The Church of Tiamat DVD release in 2006. He also appeared on the Sabbtail album Night Church, again with Mats Levén.

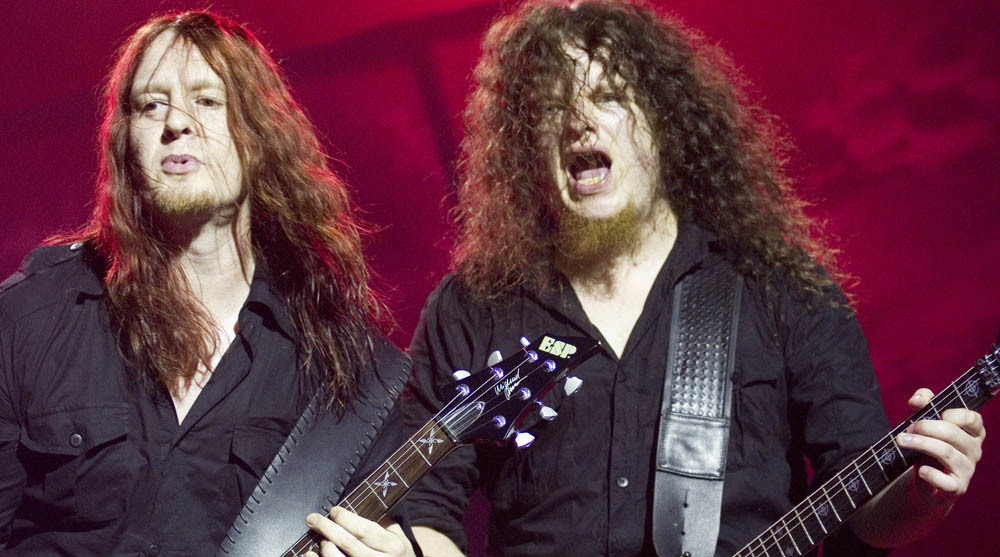
Michael Amott and Akesson (right) performing with Arch Enemy 2007

Åkesson co-wrote two tracks on the album Optimus by John Norum and appeared in the recordings. He also played with melodic death metal band Arch Enemy from 2005 to 2007, having been recruited when original Arch Enemy guitarist Christopher Amott took an 18-month break from September 2005 until his return in March 2007. Åkesson also played on the Krux album II, released in 2006. In 2007, he appeared with Krux in the Sweden Rock Festival.

On 17 May 2007, the progressive death metal band Opeth announced that Åkesson would replace departed guitarist Peter Lindgren. Åkesson's first tour with the band was the Progressive Nation Tour with Dream Theater and Between the Buried and Me. Åkesson's first album with Opeth was Watershed (2008) in which he co-wrote the song "Porcelain Heart" with Mikael Åkerfeldt. The album Heritage was released in September 2011, also with one song (the bonus track "Pyre") co-written by Åkesson.

In 2018, he contributed a guitar solo to black metal musician Ihsahn's seventh solo studio album Ámr, on the track "Arcana Imperii".

== Endorsements ==
Åkesson had an endorsement arrangement with ESP Guitars which continued into 2007. He also had his own signature model. Since joining Opeth, Åkesson switched to PRS Guitars with Marshall JVM 410 amps and cabs. In the "Porcelain Heart" videoclip he can be seen using a PRS Mark Tremonti Signature guitar. In 2009, he switched to Blackstar Amplification, using the Series One 200. In addition to his Blackstar amps, he uses Fractal Audio's Axe FX effects processor. Åkesson left Blackstar in 2012, switching his endorsement to Marshall amps. In 2011, PRS guitars produced his signature model PRS.

== Discography ==
=== With Ghost ===
- Impera (2022)
- Phantomime (2023)
- Skeletá (2025)

=== With Opeth ===
- Watershed (2008)
- In Live Concert at the Royal Albert Hall (2010)
- Heritage (2011)
- Pale Communion (2014)
- Sorceress (2016)
- Garden of the Titans: Live at Red Rocks Amphitheater (2018)
- In Cauda Venenum (2019)
- The Last Will and Testament (2024)

=== With Krux ===
- Krux (2003)
- Live (DVD) (2003)
- II (2006)
- He Who Sleeps Amongst the Stars (2011)

=== With Arch Enemy ===
- Live Apocalypse (DVD, 2006, Manchester Academy 2 show)

=== With Tiamat ===
- Church of Tiamat (DVD, 2005)

=== With John Norum ===
- Optimus (2005)

=== With Sabbtail ===
- Night Church (2004)

=== With Talisman ===
- Genesis (1993)
- Humanimal Part II (1994)
- Humanimal (1994)
- Five out of Five (Live in Japan) (1994)
- Life (1995)
- Best of... (Compilation, different from above) (1996)
- BESTerious (Compilation) (1996)
- Cats and Dogs (2003)
- Five Men Live (2005)
- 7 (2006)

=== CD singles and promos with Talisman ===
- "Mysterious (This Time Is Serious)" (CD single) (1993)
- "Time After Time" (CD single) (1993)
- "Doing Time with My Baby" (CD single) (1994)
- "Colour My XTC" (CD single) (1994)
- "Todo y Todo" (CD single) (All + All Latin American market release under nickname Genaro) (1994)
- "All + All" (CD single) (1994)
- "Frozen" (CD single) (1995)

=== With Human Clay ===
- Human Clay (1996)
- Closing the Book on Human Clay (2003)

=== With Southpaw ===
- SouthPaw (1998)

=== With Clockwise ===
- Naïve (1998)
