= Takara (band) =

American rock band

- Origin: United States
- Genres: Hard rock
- Years active: 1987 - 2019
- Labels: Progrock Records, Lion Music
- Past members: Neal Grusky; Carla Demarco; Jeff Scott Soto; Jamie Kelli; Michael J Flatters; Gus Monsanto; Gary Schutt; Bob Duda; Chad Clark; Brook Hansen; Bjorn Englen; Patrick Johannsen; Gene Mcewen
- Website: http://www.takararocks.com/

Takara was an American rock band, formed in 1987 in Los Angeles, California. Takara recorded 5 studio albums for several different record labels in the U.S., Europe, and Japan. Founding member and lead guitarist Neal Grusky, and bassist Carl Demarco remained permanent fixtures in the band since its early days.

== Biography ==
=== 1980s - Early Days ===
Takara was formed in August 1987. After a few months of rehearsals the band made their debut in October with a show in Hollywood, California. The band proceeded to play many more shows throughout 1987-88. In November 1988, Takara went into the studio to record their first demo with producer Jeff Scott Soto. As they entered the studio it became apparent that the original singer was not ready to record. In order to finish the new Takara demo, Soto was asked to help out by providing vocals for the demo. This was the beginning of a long relationship between the band and Jeff Scott Soto.

=== 1990s - The Soto Era ===
In 1990, Takara went back into the studio to record what would eventually become their debut album, Eternal Faith. In 1992 Takara regrouped and added new members who would perform in Eternal Faith. The line-up was ultimately completed with Jeff Scott Soto on vocals, Neal Grusky on guitar, Gary Schutt on bass and Bob Duda on drums. In August 1993, Zero Corporation (Japan) and Now and Then records (Europe) offered Takara a deal to release Eternal Faith in December 1993.

After a short break the band began to work on what was to become their second album. Before rehearsals began, bassist Carl Demarco replaced Schutt and they returned to the studio to record Taste of Heaven. The band enlisted Bob Daisley on bass for guest performances on two songs. Taste of Heaven was released in May 1995 by Zero Corporation (Japan) and Long Island records (Europe). Upon its release, Taste of Heaven had commercial success, and Long Island records brought Takara to Germany for a promo tour.

In 1996 Saraya Recordings, a new US label, asked permission to re-release Eternal Faith and Taste of Heaven as its first releases. Feeling that there was momentum starting to build, the band wasted no time in working on their third album. In 1998 they released Blind in Paradise through Zero Corporation (Japan), Point Music (Europe), and Saraya Recordings (US). Shortly after the release of ‘Blind in Paradise’, all of Takara's labels released a greatest hits album Eternity: Best of 93 - 98.

=== 2000-2010 Changes to the Lineup ===
In late 1998, the Takara went through significant lineup changes, leaving only guitarist/band leader Neal Grusky and bassist Carl Demarco to rebuild begin writing new material. The band found drummer Chad Clark and keyboardist Brook Hansen. Brook and Neal had known each other for years and always shared similar ideas on music. The last to come aboard was vocalist Michael J. Flatters, who Grusky found through a mutual friend. With the band complete, Takara re-entered the studio in February 2000 to record their fourth album, Perception of Reality. One year later, it was completed and released on the Avalon Marquee (Japan), Lion Music (Europe), and Metal Mayhem (US) labels.

After a hiatus of several years, Grusky decided to reform Takara in 2008, once again with a new lineup. This lineup saw the arrival of several new members including Bjorn Englen (bass), Patrick Johannson (drums), and vocalist Gus Monsanto. Keyboardist Brook Hansen returned to the lineup. Jeff Scott Soto also returned after ten years to provide harmony vocals for the resulting 2008 album entitled Invitation to Forever. This album, released by Progrock Records, marked a turning point for Takara with Grusky taking his powerful songwriting to a much harder edge than on previous Takara albums. The album subsequently gained mass approval by fans and progressive rock critics alike.

=== 2011-2019 Final Lineup and First Live Performances ===
After the release of Invitation To Forever guitarist and bandleader Neal Grusky was faced with some tough decisions. Feeling that the band had gone too far in the direction of a studio project with hired musicians contributing internationally, he opted to change the lineup once again in hopes of finding fresh local talent willing to pursue the local LA club scene. Grusky brought back Carl Demarco now "Carla DeMarco" "on bass, reuniting the core of Takara. After a long search for a suitable vocal talent, the band found Jamie Kelli, who had been regularly performing in the LA area. Drummer Gene McEwen, also active in the local scene, completed the lineup. With Kelli filling in temporarily on keyboards, Takara proceeded to prepare for a series of live shows intended to re-introduce the modern LA rock scene to both new and old material from the band. On October 30, 2010, Takara's new lineup performed their first live show to showcase new vocalist Jamie Kelli at Paladino's in Los Angeles, California. In October 2011, Takara announced they would be contributing a song to a Randy Rhoads/Ozzy Osbourne tribute album which was released in the spring of 2012 by Versailles Records. Takara recorded a version of the song "Little Dolls" from the 1981 album "Diary of a Madman".

In 2019, Grusky announced that the then current members of Takara would be moving on to alternate projects, and that for the time being Takara would no longer be active. Neal Grusky went on to form the LA progressive metal band Prey For Sunday, releasing their first self titled EP in 2021. Vocalist Jamie Kelli relocated to the Boston area where he has since formed the hard rock band Jasper Lane, releasing their debut self titled album in September 2020.

== Discography ==
=== Studio albums ===
- 1993 - Eternal Faith
- 1995 - Taste of Heaven
- 1998 - Blind in Paradise
- 2001 - Perception of Reality
- 2008 - Invitation to Forever

=== Compilations ===
- 1998 - Eternity: Best of 93 – 98

== Related Projects ==
- Talisman
- W.E.T.
- Prey For Sunday
- Soul Sign
- Jasper Lane
