= Chad Clark =

Chad Clark may refer to:

- Chad Clark (drummer), American drummer, formerly with Heaven Below
- Chad Clark (tennis) (born 1973), former American tennis player
