= Live at Sweden Rock Festival =

Live album by Talisman
- Released: October 2002
- Recorded: 9 June 2001
- Genre: Hard rock
- Length: 69:37
- Label: Empire Records
- Producer: Marcel Jacob

Talisman chronology
Truth (1998)	Live at Sweden Rock Festival (2002)	Cats and Dogs (2003)

Live at Sweden Rock Festival was the second live album by Swedish hard rock band Talisman released on Empire Records in October 2002. It charted at number 18 the first week in Sweden.

When Jeff Scott Soto, Marcel Jacob and Pontus Norgren were in Stockholm, Sweden laying vocals for their new band called Humanimal, they decided to perform at the Sweden Rock Festival in Sölvesborg, Sweden, thanks to dj Dr. Rock from the Swedish Radio Rock Klassiker who persuaded the guys to perform it.

They played at the Rockklassiker stage with a 2000 crowd capacity.

Two nights before the festival gig, Talisman played in Stockholm. Because of a miscommunication between Jamie, Pontus, Marcel and the guys doing the mobile recording stuff, Marcel's entire gear (bass included!) was left at the venue in Stockholm instead of travelling with everybody else's gear down to Sölvesborg, south of Sweden, where the Sweden Rock Festival takes place.

Marcel wanted to leave the festival but, after looking inside the tent which was fully packed with a crowd shouting for Talisman, he decided not to turn his back on those people. So Marcel and other people started to run around the festival area to look for a bass to be borrowed in time for the show: Magnus Rosén from HammerFall finally lent Marcel one of his bass guitars. The show went great and, since another band playing at Sweden Rock Festival had a mobile hard disc recording unit, Christer Wedin managed to get the Talisman show recorded as well.

But the sound Marcel had at the show was not too exciting, severe problems with Jeff's microphone and some out of tune guitars needed some fixing. So he and Pontus went into the studio to record live together the entire show exactly the same way they would have done it on stage.

== Track listing ==
1. "Colour My XTC"
2. "Fabricated War"
3. "Mysterious (This Time It's Serious)"
4. "Tainted Pages"
5. "Tears in the Sky"
6. "Crazy" (Seal Cover)
7. "Here 2Day, Gone 2Day"
8. "A Life" / "Dangerous"
9. "Body"
10. "I'll Be Waiting"
11. "Break Your Chains"
12. "Bass / Guitar Solo"
13. "All or nothing"
14. "Tie Your Mother Down" (Queen cover)
15. "I Am a Viking" (Yngwie J. Malmsteen cover)

== Credits ==
=== Talisman ===
- Jeff Scott Soto – vocals
- Pontus Norgren – guitar
- Marcel Jacob – bass
- Jamie Borger – drums
