= Gary Schutt =

American rock musician

- Born: Gary Christopher Schutt; December 29, 1967 (age 58); Monticello, New York, United States
- Origin: Los Angeles, California
- Genre: Rock
- Occupations: Singer; songwriter; multi-instrumentalist; record producer
- Instruments: Guitar; bass guitar; piano; drums
- Years active: 1990s–present
- Label: Palisade Records
- Website: garyschutt.com

Gary Schutt (born 1967) is an American rock musician who rose to prominence in Los Angeles during the 1990s while working with Jeff Scott Soto and Takara. In 1994, he moved to Florida and joined Signal Zero, later launching his solo career in 1999 with the release of Playthings. Schutt is currently in his own band, Panic Fire; and the tribute band, Diary of an Ozzman, based out of Tampa Bay, Florida.

== Early life ==
Gary Schutt was born in 1967 in Monticello, New York, as the son of William and Linda Schutt. He is proficient in guitar, bass guitar, piano, and drums, and graduated in 1990 from the Berklee College of Music in Boston, where he obtained his bachelor's degree in songwriting. While at Berklee, he performed as a guitarist in two concerts: "Shouting in the Arena" by Mike Ciano (12 February 1988) and "Parental Guidance Suggested" by Cliff Maddix (21 March 1989).

== Career ==
Gary Schutt came into prominence in the early 1990s when he moved to Los Angeles and toured and recorded with Jeff Scott Soto and Takara. After the 1994 Northridge earthquake, he moved to Florida and joined the band Signal Zero. Despite his relocation, Schutt continued collaborating with Soto and released "Sentimetal" in Japan and Europe in 1994.

Schutt's solo career began in 1999 with the release of Playthings, in which he was the sole vocalist and instrumentalist. Schutt continues to write, record, and perform his own music under his own label, Palisade Records. He is currently in his own band, Panic Fire, and the Ozzy Osbourne tribute band, Diary of an Ozzman, based out of Tampa Bay, Florida. Panic Fire has performed opening for national acts, such as Steel Panther.

Schutt is sponsored by Atomic Guitar Works.

== Discography ==
=== Solo albums ===
- Playthings (1999)
- Excruciating Pleasures (2002)
- Dramatically Acoustic (2005)
- B-Sides Myself (2005)
- Palisade Lost in Paradise (2006)
- Loss for Words (2008)
- Contingency Plan (2010)
- Puppets in Symmetry (2012)
- Moving Parts (2013)
- Under Sedation (2015)

=== With Jeff Scott Soto ===
- Sentimetal (Arise Records-Spain; Long Island Records-Germany; Zero Corporation-Japan 1994)
- Jeff Scott Soto, Gary Schutt, Michael Voss, Neal Grusky: 24th of June Alive and Kissing (Long Island Records 1995) - European Release
- Love Parade (Long Island Records, German release, 1995)
- JSS Live at the Gods 2002 (2002)
- Holding On (2002)
- The JSS Concert Live at the Queen Convention 2003 (2003)
- Lost in the Translation (2004)
- Essential Ballads (2008)
- Damage Control (2012)
- Inside the Vertigo (2015)

=== With Takara ===
- Eternal Faith (1994)
- Eternity: Best of 93 – 98 (1998)

=== E19 ===
- Just Down the Hall (2014)

=== Various compilations ===
- MVP Compilations Series Vol. 8 (1994)
- Kickstart My Heart – Motley Crue Tribute (1999)
- MelodickRock.com Volume 7 Forces of Dark and Light (2010)
- Wolfpakk (2011)
- Working Class Dogs: A Tribute to Rick Springfield (Pulse Records 2012)
