= Dreamcatcher (Last Autumn's Dream album) =

Studio album by Last Autumn's Dream
- Released: 26 January 2009
- Genre: Hard rock
- Label: Escape Music

Dreamcatcher is the sixth studio album by hard rock band Last Autumn's Dream released by Marquee Avalon in Japan on December 24, 2008 and under Escape Music label for European market on January 26, 2009.

== Track listing ==
1. "Welcome (Intro)"
2. "One By One"
3. "Hold On To My Heart"
4. "Frozen Flower"
5. "Silent Dream"
6. "Alarm"
7. "Never Faraway"
8. "Your Kind Of Loving"
9. "The Last To Know"
10. "When Love Strikes Down"
11. "Who Needs Love?"
12. "Me & You"
13. "When My Love Has Left Your Heart"
14. "Hello, Hello, Hello" (Bonus Track for Japan)

== Additional information ==
"Hello, Hello, Hello" is a cover of a song released originally by New England on their 1978 album New England.

== Personnel ==
- Mikael Erlandsson - lead vocals and keyboards
- Andy Malecek - guitar
- Marcel Jacob − bass
- Jamie Borger − drums

Guest Musicians

- Sayit Dölen (Enrique Iglesias) - additional Guitars in Alarm
- Martin Kronlund (DogFace, Gypsy Rose, White Wolf) - additional Guitars
