= Taste of Heaven =

1995 studio album by Takara

Studio album by Takara
- Released: May 1995
- Genre: Hard rock
- Label: Long Island Records
- Producer: Jeff Scott Soto

Takara chronology
Eternal Faith (1993)	Taste of Heaven (1995)	Blind in Paradise (1998)

Taste of Heaven is the second studio album by hard rock band Takara released in May 1995 on Long Island Records.

== Reception ==
Upon its release, the album was selling so well that Long Island Records brought the band to Germany for a promo tour. After one week in Germany they returned home to find that their new album had broken into the Billboard chart in Japan at number 96.

== Track listing ==
No.	Title	Length
1.	"When Darkness Falls"
2.	"Days of Dawn"
3.	"Your Love"
4.	"December"
5.	"Last Mistake"
6.	"Taste of Heaven"
7.	"Sacred Pleasure"
8.	"2 Late"
9.	"Save Me"
10.	"Lonely Shade of Blue"
11.	"Again Your Love Is Mine" (Acoustic)
12.	"Restless Heart" (Acoustic)

== Personnel ==
- Jeff Scott Soto – lead vocals, acoustic guitar, keyboards, percussion
- Carl Demarco – bass
- Neal Grusky – guitar
- Robert Duda – drums
- Bob Daisley – bass on tracks 3, 4
