= Live Apocalypse =

Video by Arch Enemy
- Released: 24 July 2006
- Recorded: 17 December 2004 and 13 December 2005
- Genre: Melodic death metal
- Label: Century Media
- Director: Martin R. Smith
- Producer: Martin R. Smith, Paul Smith

Arch Enemy chronology
Live Apocalypse (2006)	Tyrants of the Rising Sun (2008)

Live Apocalypse is a double DVD by Arch Enemy, released in 2006. It's the band's first DVD release and contains a full concert and several extras. It was released on 24 July in Europe, 26 July in Japan, and 8 August in the US.

The London Forum concert was actually the last with Christopher Amott before his departure the following year, but he later rejoined the band in 2007.

== Content ==
=== Disc one ===
Live at the London Forum – 17 December 2004
No.	Title	Length
1.	"Tear Down the Walls/Intro"	1:00
2.	"Enemy Within"	4:17
3.	"Silent Wars"	4:43
4.	"Burning Angel"	4:43
5.	"Dead Eyes See No Future"	4:36
6.	"Dead Bury Their Dead"	4:58
7.	"Bury Me an Angel"	4:13
8.	"Drum Solo"	3:29
9.	"Instinct"	3:47
10.	"Savage Messiah"	5:26
11.	"The First Deadly Sin"	4:35
12.	"The Immortal"	3:52
13.	"Bridge of Destiny"	8:14
14.	"We Will Rise"	5:52
15.	"Heart of Darkness"	5:02
16.	"Snow Bound"	1:46
17.	"Ravenous"	4:19
18.	"Fields of Desolation/Outro"	2:42
19.	"Marching on a Dead End Road" (tape)

Manchester Academy 2 – 13 December 2005
No.	Title	Length
1.	"Nemesis"
2.	"My Apocalypse"
3.	"Skeleton Dance"

=== Disc two ===
Special Features/Extras
No.	Title	Length
1.	"UK Tour 2005 Mini-Movie"	19:05
2.	"Tour!Tour!Tour!" (On the Road Movie) by Frédéric Maujoin)	6:15
3.	"Interviews & Behind the Scenes of "My Apocalypse"" (Videoshoot)	15:25
4.	"Gear Talk" (Equipment Special)	27:52
5.	"Slideshow"	7:52
6.	"Interactive Menus"

Full Promo Videos
No.	Title	Length
1.	"Ravenous"	4:06
2.	"We Will Rise"	4:07
3.	"Nemesis" (Bonus Multi-View Feature Incorporating Original Director's Cut)	4:12
4.	"My Apocalypse"	5:26

Multi-Angle Live Songs (Selections from the Forum Show)
No.	Title	Length
1.	"Dead Eyes See No Future"	4:42
2.	"Bury Me an Angel"	4:17
3.	"Heart of Darkness"	5:11

== Reception ==
=== Critical response ===
In a day in age when it seems like several metal bands are monopolizing on the opportunity to release a DVD, there are very few in my opinion that are unleashing a product upon the metal masses that is comparable to the quality that is Live Apocalypse. As far as the band's stage show goes it is also damn near perfect with the band showing that they are one of the best live metal bands out there.

— Jon Eardley, Metal Review

Live Apocalypse was acclaimed by critics. Justin Donnelly of Blistering praised the DVD describing it like "an extremely well-produced DVD set that presents Arch Enemy at its best in the live forum, as well as offering hardcore followers a little extra" and complete stating that the record "is first-class all the way." Chad Bowar of About.com praised the audio and video quality of the live footage calling it of "excellent." He also added that the record "has great live performances." Ralph of Lords of Metal praised Andy Sneap saying that he "did a good job making it sound perfect." He commented that "there's not much to say about this DVD other than that it is great... First class material, first class band!" Scott Alisoglu of Blabbermouth.net commented that "the 18-song performance stimulates the eyes and ears to the nth degree" and called the sound mix of "phenomenal". He praised the band, but noted that "it is the guitar work of Mike and Christopher Amott that really shines" on the record.

Tony Antunovich of Metal Eater praised the production stating "anything Sneap touches turns to gold." Antunovich commented that "right from the get-go, it's obvious that this is not your typical live DVD. There is absolutely no muffled sound, no piercing amp malfunctions, and you're not going be bored to tears watching one consistent shot of the band performing on stage... The filming techniques are just amazing." He finishes stating that "if there ever was a music DVD that sets the standard for all others to follow, it's this one" and that "truly is one of the best Metal DVDs ever produced." Not unlike him, journalist Jon Eardley of Metal Review ranked Live Apocalypse as one of best metal DVDs along Lamb of God's Killadelphia, Dream Theater's Metropolis 2000 and Opeth's Lamentations.

=== Accolades ===
Live Apocalypse won DVD of the Year at the 2006 Burrn! Magazine Awards.

== Personnel ==
=== Arch Enemy ===
- Angela Gossow − vocals
- Michael Amott − guitars
- Christopher Amott − guitars at the London Forum show
- Sharlee D'Angelo − bass
- Daniel Erlandsson − drums
- Fredrik Åkesson − guitars at Manchester Academy 2 show

=== Production ===
- Martin R. Smith − concert producer, director
- Paul Smith − DVD authoring, editing, producer
- Andy Sneap − mixing
