= Talisman (Talisman album) =

Studio album by Talisman
- Released: 1990
- Studio: Stockholm Recording, Stockholm
- Genre: Hard rock
- Length: 39:29
- Label: Airplay/Vinylmania
- Producer: Mats Lindfors

Talisman chronology
Talisman (1990)	Genesis (1993)

Singles from Talisman
- 1. "I'll Be Waiting" / "Dangerous" Released: 1990; 2. "Just Between Us" / "Standin' on Fire" Released: 1990

Professional ratings
Review scores
Source	Rating
AllMusic	(No review)

Talisman is the first studio album by hard rock band Talisman, released in 1990 through Airplay/Vinylmania. It has been reissued three times: first in 1993 through Dino Music; followed by a remastered edition in 2003 through Dino/Empire Records, containing a bonus disc with demos and live recordings from 1990; and once again on 12 September 2012, as a deluxe Digipak edition with further bonus material.

== Track listing ==
No.	Title	Writer(s)	Length
1.	"Break Your Chains"	Marcel Jacob, Anders Jakobsson	3:33
2.	"Standin' on Fire"	Jacob, Jeff Scott Soto	4:14
3.	"I'll Be Waiting"	Jacob, Soto	2:58
4.	"Dangerous"	Jacob	3:47
5.	"Just Between Us"	Jacob, Soto	3:48
6.	"System of Power"	Mats Lindfors, Michael Lorenz	4:45
7.	"Queen"	Jacob, Soto	3:16
8.	"Lightning Strikes"	Jacob, Soto	3:17
9.	"Day by Day"	Jacob	4:10
10.	"Women, Whiskey & Song"	Jacob	3:05
11.	"Great Sandwich"	Jacob	2:36
Total length:			39:29

2003 deluxe edition bonus tracks
No.	Title	Writer(s)	Length
12.	"Break Your Chains" (demo)	Jacob, Jakobsson
13.	"Under Fire" (demo)	Jacob
14.	"If You Need Somebody" (demo)	Jacob
15.	"Dangerous" (demo)	Jacob
16.	"Oceans" (demo)	Jacob
17.	"Lightning Strikes" (demo)	Jacob, Soto
18.	"Day dy Day" (demo)	Jacob
19.	"NJBBWD" (demo)	Jacob
20.	"Just Between Us" (live)	Jacob, Soto
21.	"Eternal Flame" (live)	Jacob, Norum
22.	"Scream of Anger" (live)	Jacob, Joey Tempest
23.	"Eternal Flame" (live)	Jacob
24.	"NJBBWO" (live)	Jacob
25.	"Let Me Love You" (live)	Jacob, John Norum
26.	"Ice Cream Man" (live)	John Brim

2012 deluxe editions bonus tracks
No.	Title	Writer(s)	Length
12.	"MJ Playing Solo In Studio"	Jacob	1:23
13.	"Just Between Us" (live in Kopparberg, 1990)	Jacob, Soto	4:088
14.	"Eternal Flame" (live in Kopparberg, 1990)	Jacob, Norum	3:13
15.	"I'll Be Waiting" (live in Kopparberg, 1990)	Jacob, Soto	3:15
16.	"Scream Of Anger" (live in Kopparberg, 1990)	Jacob, Tempest	4:30
17.	"NJBBWD" (live in Kopparberg, 1990)	Jacob	3:26
18.	"Standin' on Fire" (live in Kopparberg, 1990)	Jacob, Soto	4:48
19.	"Let Me Love You" (live in Kopparberg, 1990)	Jacob, Norum	3:15
20.	"Ice Cream Man" (live at Blues Brothers in Stockholm, 1990)	Brim	4:43
Total length:			76:00

== Personnel ==
- Jeff Scott Soto – vocals
- Christopher Ståhl – guitar
- Mats Lindfors – guitar, mixing, producer
- Marcel Jacob – guitar, keyboard, drums (except tracks 6, 8), bass, mixing
- Mats Olausson – keyboard
- Peter Hermansson – drums (tracks 6, 8)
- Lennart Östlund – mixing
- Peter Dahl – mastering
- Micke Lind – remastering
