= Life (Talisman album) =

Studio album by Talisman
- Released: 23 August 1995
- Genre: Hard rock
- Length: 50:55
- Label: Polydor Records, Xero
- Producer: Marcel Jacob, Jeff Scott Soto

Talisman chronology
Humanimal (1994)	Life (1995)	Truth (1998)

Life was the 4th studio album by hard rock band Talisman released on 23 August 1995 on Polydor Records.

This album was written in Jeff Scott Soto's house over a couple weeks time in March 1995. This time they opted for convenience, recording everything separately, drums in Park studios, bass in Marcel Jacob’s pad, guitars in a small room just outside Stockholm.

The tapes were then sent to Jeff in Los Angeles where he would do vocal overdubs. The first time the band was all together in the same room was during mixing.

The mixing was done by Mats Lindfors. Marcel was unhappy with the result. The Japanese label were hurried, having planned their release date, and opted for the original mix. The European version is therefore a remix.

When the album was released in the summer of 1995, it didn’t do as well as the predecessors. The labels involved had problems with distribution, people were getting fired, the Japanese label went bankrupt.

== Track listing ==
1. "Tears in the Sky" - 4:17
2. "Temptation" - 4:21
3. "A Life" - 5:07
4. "Sympathy" - 4:38
5. "All That Really Matters" - 3:46
6. "Loveblind" - 3:09
7. "Crazy" - 4:34
8. "So Long" - 4:24
9. "Body" - 3:27
10. "Soul 2 Soul" - 4:34
11. "How Was I to Know (Bonus Japanese)" - 3:49
12. "Hands Of Time (Bonus Japanese)" - 4:52

Track 7 originally recorded by Seal on the album Seal.

== Personnel ==
- Jeff Scott Soto – lead vocals
- Marcel Jacob – bass
- Fredrik Åkesson – guitar
- Julie Greaux – keyboards
- Jamie Borger – drums

== Singles and Promos ==
- Crazy (CD Single) (1995)
