= Blind in Paradise =

Studio album by Takara
- Released: 1998
- Genre: Hard rock
- Label: Point Music & Saraya Recordings
- Producer: Jeff Scott Soto

Takara chronology
Taste of Heaven (1995)	Blind in Paradise (1998)	Perception of Reality (2001)

Blind in Paradise is the third studio album by hard rock band Takara released in 1998 on Point Music & Saraya Recordings.

== Track listing ==
1. "Take U Down"
2. "Your Love 2night"
3. "Fly 2 Your Arms"
4. "Love Is Gone"
5. "What Do U Want From Me"
6. "Time Waits 4 No One"
7. "Blind In Paradise"
8. "Don't Wanna Be Alone"
9. "No Love's Enough"
10. "Lookin' Out"
11. "Say U'll Stay"
12. "Awake & Dreaming"

== Personnel ==
- Jeff Scott Soto – lead vocals
- Neal Grusky – guitar
- Carl Demarco – bass
- Eric Ragno – keyboards
- Robert Duda – drums
- Bob Daisley - bass on track 8
- Bernie Tavis - violin on track 8
