= Cats and Dogs (Talisman album) =

Studio album by Talisman
- Released: 12 May 2003
- Recorded: Planet Studios, Acqui Terme, Italy
- Genre: Hard rock
- Length: 49:53
- Label: Frontiers Records
- Producer: Marcel Jacob, Jeff Scott Soto

Talisman chronology
Live at Sweden Rock Festival (2001)	Cats and Dogs (2003)	Five Men Live (2005)

Cats and Dogs is the sixth studio album by Swedish hard rock band Talisman released on 12 May 2003 on Frontiers Records.

The release of the album was followed by a tour in Europe, which included a headlining slot at Gods of AOR Festival in the UK, a performance at Frontiers Showcase in Italy, a new appearance at the Sweden Rock Festival and a show at the Lokerse Festival in Belgium

== Track listing ==
- Cats side
1. "Skin on Skin" - 3:21
2. "Break It Down Again" - 3:49
3. "In Make Believe" - 3:25
4. "Love Will Come Again" - 4:12
5. "Outta My Way" - 3:58
6. "Friends to Strangers" - 3:13
- Dogs side
1. "Sorry" - 3:45
2. "Trapped" - 3:10
3. "M.O.M" - 3:38
4. "Wherever Whenever Whatever" - 3:44
5. "Lost in the Wasteland" - 4:32
6. "Hell in Paradise" - 4:29
7. "Time" (Japanese edition bonus track) - 4:37

== Credits ==
=== Talisman ===
- Jeff Scott Soto – vocals
- Fredrik Åkesson – guitar
- Marcel Jacob – bass
- Jamie Borger – drums
