= Humanimal (album) =

Humanimal (Part 1 & Part 2)

Studio album by Talisman
- Released: 25 May 1994 & 19 October 1994
- Genre: Hard rock
- Length: 58:07 & 55:31
- Label: Polydor Records
- Producer: Ronni Lahti

Talisman chronology
| Five out of Five (Live in Japan) (1994) | Humanimal (Part 1 & Part 2) (1994) | Life (1995) |

Humanimal is the third studio album by hard rock band Talisman released on 25 May 1994 (Part 1) and 19 October 1994 (Part 2) on Polydor Records.

The recordings took place in Sound Trade Studios with the help of Ronny Lahti. The final album, recorded and mixed in 22 days, was 22 tracks. This led to JSS & MJ discussing a double CD, but since almost all the material would fit on one CD, they finally opted for a single CD with all the best tracks. The Japanese label was given the permission to put together their own selection of the track they deemed suitable for the Japanese audience.

The band were somewhat unhappy with the list of songs on the Japanese version, and eventually the Japanese label released the Swedish version as well, because of the amount of imports. Later there was a second European release of the outtakes as well.

== Track listing ==
=== Part 1 ===
1. "3233 + Colour my XTC" – 5:03
2. "Fabricated War" – 3:25
3. "Tainted Pages" – 4:51
4. "TV Reality" – 4:17
5. "Seasons" – 5:11
6. "All + All" – 3:59
7. "D.O.A.P.S." – 3:55
8. "Blissful Garden" – 4:33
9. "Lonely World" – 4:13
10. "Delusions of Grandeur" – 4:04
11. "Since You've Gone" – 3:26
12. "Humanimal" – 5:23
13. "Doin' Time Wit' My Baby" – 2:35

=== Part 2 ===
1. "Animal Ritual" – 3:52
2. "You Cannot Escape the Revelation of the Identical by Seeking Refuge in the Illusion of the Multiple" – 2:07
3. "My Best Friends Girl" – 3:11
4. "Dear God" – 4:34
5. "Hypocrite" – 3:07
6. "Wasting R Time" – 4:14
7. "To Know Someone Deeply Is to Know Someone Softly" (Terence Trent D'Arby Cover) – 3:20
8. "Todo Y Todo" – 3:53

== Personnel ==
- Jeff Scott Soto – lead vocals
- Marcel Jacob – bass
- Fredrik Åkesson – guitar
- Ronny Lahti – guitar
- Julie Greaux – keyboards
- Jamie Borger – drums

== Singles and promos ==
- All + All (CD single) (1994)
- Todo Y Todo (CD single) (All + All Latin American market release under nickname Genaro) (1994)
- Colour My XTC (CD single) (1994)
- Doin' Time Wit' My Baby (CD single) (1994)
