= Eternal Faith =

Studio album by Takara
- Released: 8 December 1993
- Genre: Hard rock; hair metal
- Label: Now and Then Records
- Producer: Jeff Scott Soto

Takara chronology
Eternal Faith (1993)	Taste of Heaven (1995)

Eternal Faith is the first studio album by hard rock band Takara. It was released in December 1993 on Now and Then Records.

The album was released to a very receptive audience. This new album entered the Burrn! Charts at #16 and European charts at #8. It went on to sell 15,000 worldwide. These were very impressive numbers for a band that didn't even tour Japan or Europe.

== Track listing ==
1. "Spotlight"
2. "Two Hearts Together"
3. "Don't Walk Away"
4. "Just Like Yesterday"
5. "Restless Heart"
6. "First Attraction"
7. "I Don't Believe"
8. "Fallen Angel"
9. "Colors Fade"
10. "Passions of the Heart"

== Personnel ==
- Jeff Scott Soto – lead vocals
- Gary Schutt – bass
- Neal Grusky – guitar
- Robert Duda – drums
