= Truth (Talisman album) =

Studio album by Talisman
- Released: 27 December 1998
- Genre: Hard rock
- Length: 58:36
- Label: Point Music
- Producers: Jeff Scott Soto, Marcel Jacob

Talisman chronology
Life (1995)	Truth (1998)	Live at Sweden Rock Festival (2001)

Singles from Truth
- 1. "Frozen" Released: 1998

Truth was the fifth studio album by Swedish hard rock band Talisman released on 27 December 1998 by Point Music.

Marcel Jacob and Jeff Scott Soto wrote most of the material during ten days in Soto's new house in Los Angeles, after which the rest of the band (now including guitar player Pontus Norgren) joined up for a couple of weeks of rehearsals and recording of backing tracks. Drums were laid down in a small studio, and the rest was done in Soto's home studio. The mixing took place in Boston, by John Ellis.

The album was released by Point Music for Europe, and Pony Canyon in Japan. Once again there was no touring done for an album, due to the lack of interest by either label to promote the act. The album received mixed critical reviews, though there were notable tracks on the release including Madonna's "Frozen".

"Let Me Entertain You" is a cover-version of (Queen)'s song, "Darling Nikki" a cover-version of Prince's song and "Frozen" a cover-version of Madonna's song.

== Track listing ==
1. "Let Me Entertain You" - 3:17
2. "In the End" - 4:04
3. "Here 2day, Gone 2day" - 4:32
4. "Darling Nikki" - 3:12
5. "I'll B There 4 U" - 4:38
6. "The Man I'll Never Be" - 4:35
7. "Bellabecca" (instrumental) - 1:42
8. "Heaven's Got Another Hero" - 5:09
9. "Your Man" - 3:14
10. "Frozen" - 5:41
11. "Until the Morning Comes" - 5:24
12. "Angel/Devil" - 4:12
13. "Pavilion of Oblivion" - 4:17
14. "Madison" - 6:38

=== Japanese edition bonus tracks ===
15. "T 4 1 1/2" (instrumental) - 2:19

=== 2013 Deluxe edition ===
1. "Here 2day, Gone 2day" - 4:32
2. "In the End" - 4:04
3. "Until the Morning Comes" - 5:24
4. "Frozen" - 5:41
5. "Your Man" - 3:14
6. "Angel/Devil" - 4:12
7. "The Man I'll Never Be" - 4:35
8. "Bellabecca" (instrumental) - 1:42
9. "I'll B There 4 U" - 4:38
10. "Madison" - 6:38
11. "Heaven's Got Another Hero" - 5:09
12. "Pavilion of Oblivion" - 4:17
13. "Darling Nikki" - 3:12
14. "T 4 1 ½" (instrumental) - 2:20
15. "Let Me Entertain You" - 3:18
16. "Heaven's Got Another Hero" (demo) - 5:17
17. "Here 2Day, Gone 2Day" (demo) - 4:33

== Personnel ==
=== Talisman ===
- Jeff Scott Soto – lead vocals
- Marcel Jacob – bass
- Pontus Norgren – guitar
- Jamie Borger – drums

=== Additional musicians ===
- Jody Whitesides – guitar
- Frank Salerno – keyboards
- Dawn White – backing vocals
