= Genesis (Talisman album) =

Studio album by Talisman
- Released: 7 July 1993
- Recorded: December 1992
- Genre: Hard rock
- Length: 49:12
- Label: Dino Records
- Producer: Marcel Jacob

Talisman chronology
| Talisman (1990) | Genesis (1993) | Five out of Five (Live in Japan) (1994) |

Genesis was the second studio album by hard rock band Talisman released on 7 July 1993 on Dino Records.

Drummer Jake Samuels had left them to join Zinny J. Zan's band and then Marcel Jacob made all programmed drums used on the recording with an Alesis SR-16.

The album was recorded and mixed in three weeks in December 1992 at Stocksund Recording Studios. The band had a little help from Mats Lindfors (who later did the mixing) with engineering, and then Marcel Jacob recorded himself and Fredrik Åkesson.

Soto joined recording along with his then-girlfriend Julie Greaux (Billy Idol, Axel Rudi Pell) who ended up playing the grand piano on "All I Want".

When the album was released, the single "Mysterious" got some airplay, the album immediately sold some 15,000+ copies in Sweden. Both Genesis and Talisman garnered some international interest, and were released in Japan on Toshiba-EMI's Zero Corporation label

== Track listing ==
1. "Time After Time" - 3:35
2. "Comin' Home" - 3:38
3. "Mysterious (This Time It's Serious)" - 3:22
4. "If U Would Only Be My Friend" - 4:46
5. "All or Nothing" - 3:47
6. "All I Want" - 5:32
7. "U Done Me Wrong" - 2:37
8. "I'll Set Your House on Fire" - 3:28
9. "Give Me a Sign" - 4:53
10. "Lovechild" - 3:46
11. "Long Way 2 Go" - 5:11
12. "Run with the Pack (Bad Company cover) (Japanese release bonus track)" - 4:31

=== 2003 deluxe edition bonus track ===
1. "Time After Time"
2. "Comin' Home"
3. "U Done Me Wrong"
4. "Give Me a Sign"
5. "Fighting for Your Life"
6. "Time After Time (Demo)"
7. "Give Me a Sign (Demo)"
8. "Angel"
9. "Lovechild (Demo)"
10. "Rainbows End"

=== 2012 deluxe edition bonus track ===
1. "Give Me a Sign" (Demo version re-recorded and mixed, 2012)
2. "Comin' Home" (Demo version re-recorded and mixed, 2012)
3. "U Done Me Wrong" (Demo version re-recorded and mixed, 2012)
4. "Time After Time" (Demo version re-recorded and mixed, 2012)

== Personnel ==
- Jeff Scott Soto – lead vocals
- Marcel Jacob – bass
- Fredrik Åkesson – guitar
- Julie Greaux – keyboards
- Jake Samuels – drums

== Singles and promos ==
- "Time After Time" (CD single) – 1993
- "Mysterious (This Time It's Serious)" (CD single) – 1993
