= Perception of Reality =

Studio album by Takara
- Released: 5 December 2001
- Genre: Hard rock
- Label: Lion Music

Takara chronology
Blind in Paradise (1998)	Perception of Reality (2001)

Perception of Reality was the 4th studio album by hard rock band Takara released in 2001 on Lion Music & Saraya Recordings. It is their first album without vocalist Jeff Scott Soto.

== Track listing ==
1. "Miles Away"
2. "Shadows In The Night"
3. "Tomorrow"
4. "Without You"
5. "Ready To Promise"
6. "L.I.E.S."
7. "Dream Of It All"
8. "Believe"
9. "Tell Me"

== Personnel ==
- Michael J Flatters – lead vocals
- Neal Grusky – guitar
- Carl Demarco – bass
- Brook Hansen – keyboards
- Chad Clark – drums
