= Bjorn Englen =

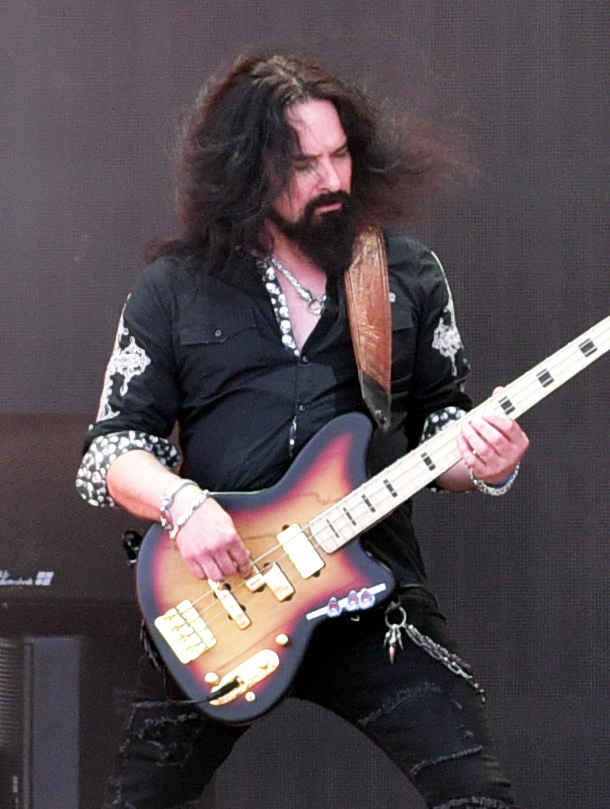
- Englen performing in 2024

Background information
- Origin: Växjö, Sweden
- Genres: Hard rock, heavy metal, rock
- Years active: 1984–present
- Label: Grand Mercy Records
- Website: Official website

Bjorn Englen (born Björn Erik Englén in Växjö, Sweden) is the bass player for Soul Sign and Dio Disciples. Bjorn has also played bass for Yngwie Malmsteen, Quiet Riot, MSG/Survivor vocalist Robin McAuley, Scorpions guitarist Uli Jon Roth and Tony MacAlpine.

== Biography ==
Bjorn Englen started his musical career in Sweden in 1984 as a drummer; however, switched to bass within a couple of months. He performed with several local acts before relocating to Los Angeles, CA in 1993.

Englen has played over 2000 live shows and on nearly 60 albums. He has recorded/performed with members of Foreigner, Deep Purple, Kiss, The Supremes, David Lee Roth, Dio, Ozzy, Elton John, Rainbow, Journey, Korn, Dream Theater, Whitesnake, Heart, Judas Priest, Guns N' Roses, Sweet, Steve Vai, George Lynch, Vixen, Buddy Guy, Alice Cooper, Paul Rodgers & more.

Bjorn has also spent a lot of time educating up and coming musicians teaching bass and ensemble at numerous schools including Musicians Institute in Hollywood from 1996 to 1997, Rock’n’Roll Fantasy Camp (since 2016) and through clinics and master classes worldwide since 1994, including Los Angeles College of Music and B.I.T. - Musicians Institute College of Music.

=== Quiet Riot ===
In 1994 Englen was hired to play bass for heavy metal group Quiet Riot. He did pre-production work and promotion for the album Down to the Bone as well as 22 shows in a 1995 tour supporting the album.

=== Soul Sign ===
Shortly thereafter, Englen formed his own group Soul Sign. Soul Sign did promotional tours and shows in Europe and the US in 2010 and 2011 for the then forthcoming album "Life In The Dark", which was released worldwide in the autumn of 2011. The current line-up also features Malmsteen/Roth vocalist Mark Boals and toured in Scandinavia in May 2013 and in USA 2012-2014, 2019, 2023, 2024. The group's latest album "Desert Fire" was released digitally through Earache Records, and on CD through NLTM Records on April 4th, 2025.

Bjorn also toured the U.S. in 1996 as the hired bassist for Wrestless Natives. He has recorded or composed music and toured as a member of Heaven & Earth with members of Foreigner, Heart, Dio and Sweet (1999—2000), Bleed (2004—2006) and Takara (2002—2008).

=== Robin McAuley ===
In 2004 to 2006, he performed throughout the US with MSG/Survivor vocalist Robin McAuley.

=== Yngwie Malmsteen ===
From 2007 to 2012, Englen played bass for Yngwie Malmsteen's Rising Force. They toured and performed in Europe and the U.S. in 2007 & 2008. A sold out tour of Japan was completed in April 2009., and a tour of Russia and Israel in April 2010. Another US Tour supporting the album "Relentless" was done in October and November 2011. Bjorn decided to leave Yngwie's band in 2012 due to unforeseen scheduling conflicts.

=== Uli Jon Roth ===
Former Scorpions guitarist Uli Jon Roth watched Bjorn perform his first show with Malmsteen and ended up hiring Bjorn for numerous tours and shows 2010-2013. In 2011 Englen was concurrently the bassist for three of the biggest guitar heroes of all time; Malmsteen, Roth and Tony MacAlpine.

=== Tony MacAlpine ===
From 2011 to 2017, Bjorn played for guitar/keyboard virtuoso Tony MacAlpine (Steve Vai, PSMS, Planet X). Several shows were done in the US 2011-2012. A 27 shows in 17 countries European Tour started on Feb 21st, 2012 in Manchester, UK and ended on Mar 23rd in Moscow, RU, followed by numerous shows and tours of Mexico and Colombia 2013-2014, as well as four US Tours 2014-2017 (including 8 dates supporting Steve Vai's "Passion & Warfare" 25th Anniversary Tour).

=== DIO Disciples ===
Since October 2012, Bjorn has been a member of the Official DIO band Dio Disciples featuring long-time and most recent Dio members Craig Goldy (Dio, Guiffria) - guitar, Simon Wright (Dio, AC/DC, UFO) - drums and Scott Warren (Dio, Heaven & Hell) - keyboards with Tim "Ripper" Owens (Judas Priest) and Oni Logan (Lynch Mob) on vocals. In Oct/Nov 2012 the band did a 24 date US Tour in support of Dio's latest release "The Beast of Dio Vol. 2". In March 2013 DIO Disciples headlined at the Monsters of Rock cruise in the Caribbean Sea as well as finished a Brazil/Mexico/Texas Tour in June 2013 partially together with Nazareth. The band performed in the US & Canada in July, September and October 2013, USA 2014, Mexico 2014, Monsters of Rock Cruise 2014 & 2016, Fezen Festival in Hungary 2016 and Wacken Festival in Germany 2016 featuring a hologram performance with Ronnie James Dio as an encore. In December 2017 the band toured Europe as Dio Returns where a portion of the set featured a Ronnie James Dio hologram. The band continued to tour all over the US in 2018, and a full US Tour was completed in June 2019. In August 2024 the band performed at Wacken (DE), Alcatraz (BE) and Leyendas Del Rock (ES) festivals, as well as special guest of Mr Big in Oslo, Norway.

Bjorn has in the last few years also worked with successful acts such as Hellion, Blackwelder, Of Gods & Monsters, Takara and more.

== Press ==
Bjorn Englen was featured in a two-page article of Bassiste Magazine in March/April 2010, a cover featured article in Basista Magazine in April 2012, a 3-page article in Soundquest Magazine in June 2012, interview in Rock N Roll Industries Magazine in July 2013, as well as full-page and back cover ads in Bass Player magazine in 2010-2012 promoting the Carvin SB5000 bass and Spectraflex cables, as well as full page ads in various magazines promoting EBS amps & pedals.

== Gear ==
Bjorn endorses EBS amp systems & pedals (mainly featuring the 802 amp, Reidmar 750 amp, NEO-line cabinets, MultiComp/DynaVerb/OctaBass Pedals, Billy Sheehan Signature Drive and the MicroBass 3 pre-amp), Ibanez bass guitars, Hipshot bass Xtenders & hardware, Babicz bridges, DiMarzio pickups, Gator cases, Stringjoy strings, Intex cables, Pick Guy custom guitar picks, Boss wireless systems, CAD headphones & audio accessories, Al Bane leather straps, Darkglass noise gates, Rock'n'Roll Gangstar apparel, Flying Eagle leather apparel, MAK hair products, Fishman acoustic pickups/preamps, Ampeg speaker cabinet covers, Blackstar bluetooth speakers.
