= Soul SirkUS =

American hard rock group

- Origin: 2003
- Genres: Hard rock
- Years active: 2003–2005
- Past members: Jeff Scott Soto; Neal Schon; Marco Mendoza; Deen Castronovo; Virgil Donati

Soul SirkUS was a band that initially featured singer Jeff Scott Soto, guitarist Neal Schon, bassist Marco Mendoza, and drummer Deen Castronovo, later replaced by Virgil Donati.

== History ==
After the Planet Us project with Sammy Hagar did not produce an album, Neal Schon was determined to see the material he had written come to life. According to Schon, "I was angry because we had plans and I had done a lot of pre-work. I wrote a lot of songs, about 30 or more, and I had just done a lot of work and put a lot of energy into it. ... A few days later I cooled off and I just re-grouped and got to my senses and I put the pieces of the puzzle back together again with some different guys." (See the Planet Us article for further history leading to the formation of Soul SirkUS).

Schon had heard of the reputation of Soto, mainly due to coverage on the AOR-focused website MelodicRock.com, which detailed his history with the band Talisman. At the 2004 annual NAMM Show in Los Angeles, Schon met up with Soto and tested the waters with a jam session: "Jeff brought his drummer and his bass player down and we sort of sketched out a little set, even though we didn’t have time to rehearse. We did some Led Zeppelin and Journey songs and we did some Stevie Wonder and some blues. We played a little 45-minute set and the people pretty much went off; they loved it. Immediately, I knew we had some chemistry and that it would work."

While in Los Angeles, Schon also attended a showcase featuring Mendoza (known for his work with Whitesnake) and was impressed with his ability. Inviting Soto, Mendoza and Journey's drummer Castronovo to join him, the new band began rehearsing and eventually recorded 11 songs for their debut album, World Play. Although all the foundation tracks on the album were originally written for Planet Us, only one completed song from that band was used for Soul SirkUS' debut. That song was "Peephole", originally entitled "Peeping Through a Hole" on the Planet Us version. The rest of the album was developed by Soto who took Schon's lengthy instrumental tracks and "chopped them down" into songs which he added his vocals to.

In early 2005, with a completed album ready (albeit only available online through the Soul SirkUS website) the band was forced to postpone their first tour when Castronovo fell ill due to extreme exhaustion. Soon after, Castronovo bowed out of Soul Sirkus based on his doctor's recommendation and was replaced by Australian drummer Virgil Donati. Schon decided to take advantage of Donati's unique style and remixed the World Play album with Donati's drum tracks while adding five new songs. The updated lineup then embarked on a short but well-received tour of the U.S. and Europe.

The remixed World Play album was re-released with new artwork on the European-based Frontiers Records label. A live concert performed at the famed Fillmore theatre in San Francisco was recorded for a potential DVD that has yet to be released by the band and may not be. Since the end of the 2005 tour, the band has not reconvened due to the members' various other commitments.

In the summer of 2006, Soto was selected as the "temporary" lead vocalist for Journey replacing Steve Augeri.

Historically, Neal Schon and Deen Castronovo have also played together in Journey, Bad English, Hardline, and Paul Rodgers' backing band. Castronovo also played on Schon's song "Smoke of the Revolution" from the Late Nite album. In 2014, Castronovo and Mendoza again joined Schon on his So U solo album.

In 2019, Schon, Castronovo and Mendoza toured together in Neal Schon's Journey Through Time, which also included former Journey keyboardist Gregg Rolie.

== Discography ==
- World Play (3 editions: 1. black sleeve: original (with Deen), 2. green sleeve: American edition of remaster, 3. yellow sleeve: 3a. European edition of remaster [incl bonus DVD]/ 3b. Japanese edition of remaster [incl bonus track])
