= Soul Sign =

US musical group

- Origin: Los Angeles, California
- Genres: Hard rock, heavy metal
- Years active: 1995–2001, 2006–present
- Labels: Grand Mercy Records, Legendary Artists, Earache Records, No Life 'Til Metal Records, Roxx Records
- Members: Bjorn Englen; Rob Math; Mike Cancino; Mark Boals
- Website: Official Website

Soul Sign is an American heavy metal group based out of Los Angeles featuring Bjorn Englen on bass, Mark Boals on vocals, Mike Cancino on drums, and Rob Math on guitar.

The band has toured in US 1997–2001, 2009–2014, 2019, 2022–2024, and in Europe 2010 and 2013. Their discography includes Control (EP), Released by Xmas, Life In The Dark, "Out Of The Dark / White Room" and Desert Fire.

After a successful show at The Sunset Strip Music Festival in Los Angeles in August 2012 with Mark Boals on vocals, the band decided to recruit Boals as their new singer. Former vocalist Michael Olivieri had decided to strictly focus on a solo career. In May 2013 Soul Sign toured Scandinavia with shows in Denmark and Sweden in support of "Life In the Dark".

The band's latest release Desert Fire was released on April 4, 2025, with tour dates to follow.

== Band members ==
Current

- Mark Boals - vocals (since 2012)
- Bjorn Englen - bass guitar (since 1995)
- Rob Math - guitar (2010–2012, since 2021)
- Mike Cancino - drums (since 2011)

Former

- Magnus Andersson (guitar) 1995–1996
- David Keckhut (vocals) 1996 & 2000–2001
- Glen Sobel (drums) 1996
- David Jordan (drums) 1997–2001
- Michael Helge (guitar) 1997–1998
- David Hare (vocals) 1997–1998
- Sebastian Nicolescu (vocals) 1998
- Scott Ramsay (guitar) 1998 & 2007–2010
- Mike Taylor (drums) 2006–2011
- Michael Olivieri (vocals) 2007–2012
- Adam Jones (drums) 2010 & 2013
- Dave Bates (guitar) 2012 & 2019
- Jan Mengeling (guitar) 2013–2018
- Billy Cannon (drums) 2013–2014

== Discography ==
- Control EP (1996)
- Released By Xmas (1998)
- Life In The Dark (2011)
- "Out Of The Dark" / "White Room" single (2024)
- Desert Fire (2025)
