= Marcel Jacob =

Swedish bassist (1964–2009)

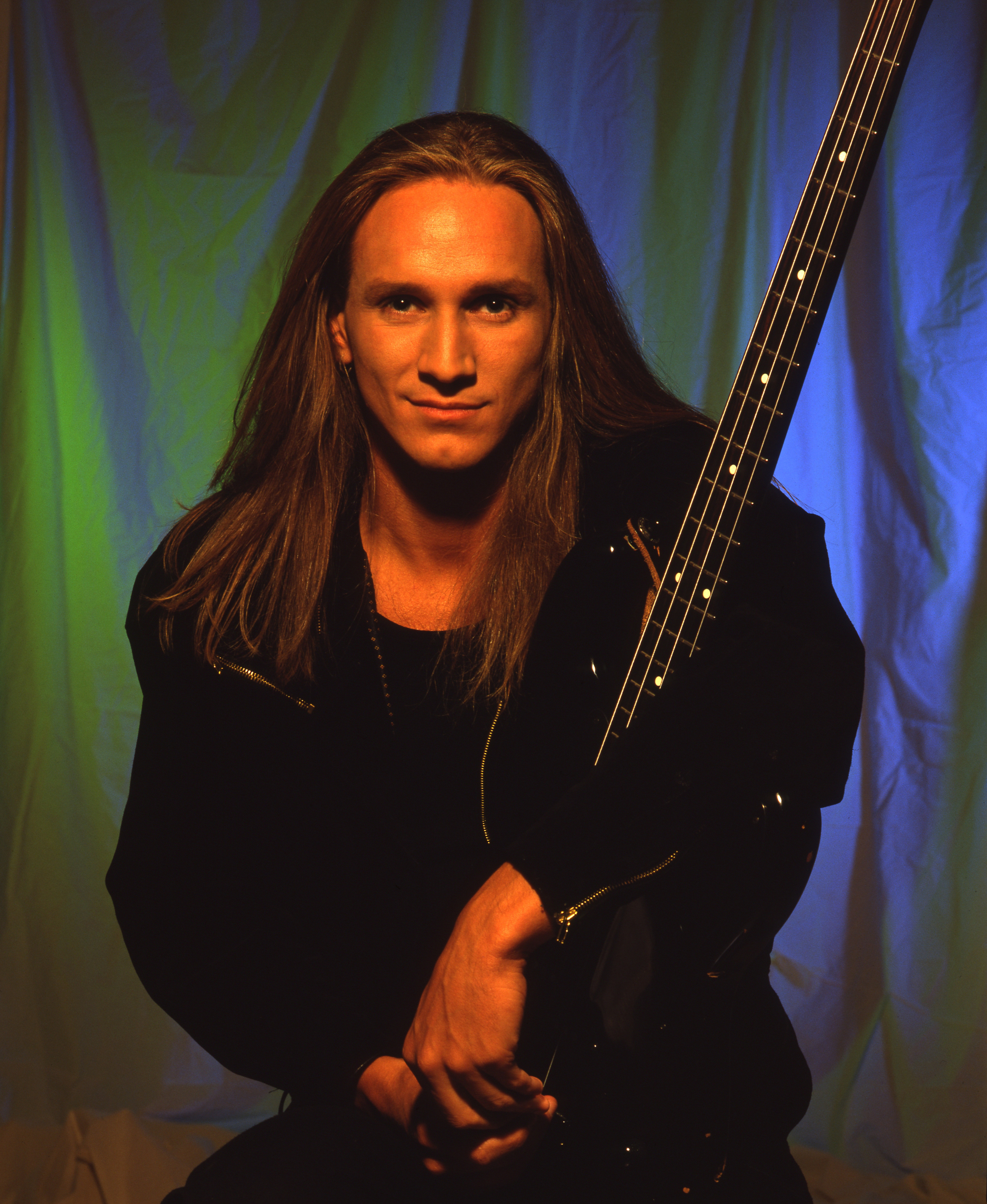

Background information
- Also known as: Marre
- Born: Marcel Karl Jacob; 30 January 1964; Stockholm, Sweden
- Died: 21 July 2009 (aged 45) Kristineberg, Stockholm, Sweden
- Genres: Hard rock, heavy metal
- Occupations: Musician, songwriter
- Instrument: Bass guitar
- Years active: 1978–2009
- Formerly of: Talisman, Yngwie Malmsteen, Europe
- Website: talismanmusic.se

Marcel Karl Jacob (30 January 1964 – 21 July 2009) was a Swedish musician, best known as the founder, chief songwriter, and bassist of the hard rock band Talisman. For a brief period, he also played in the band Europe and with Yngwie Malmsteen. Jacob was also a skilled lead guitarist, occasionally playing guitar solos on albums where he felt the guitarist did not perform to his standards.

== Biography ==
In 1978, Jacob formed the band Rising Force together with guitarist Yngwie Malmsteen. Three years later Jacob joined the band Force, which later changed its name to Europe, replacing John Levén, who took Jacob's place in Rising Force. During his time in Force, Jacob wrote the song "Black Journey Through My Soul" together with vocalist Joey Tempest. The song was eventually included on Europe's second album Wings of Tomorrow, retitled "Scream of Anger". After spending three months in Force, Jacob traded places with John Levén again, who apparently had issues with Malmsteen. In 1985, Jacob returned to Malmsteen's band to play on the album Marching Out and parts of the following US tour. He left the band in November 1985 due to issues with Yngwie's management and in 1986 he toured with jazz-rock band Wasa Express.

In 1987, Jacob played on the album Total Control, the first solo album released by Europe guitarist John Norum. Jacob also re-used demo tracks from his pre-Yngwie band Power for several of the songs included on that album, including the Swedish hit single "Let Me Love You". Two years later he formed the band Talisman together with vocalist Jeff Scott Soto. Throughout the years Talisman was Jacob's major effort and the band released several studio and live albums until 2007.

In 1989 Jacob was back in the USA, auditioned for Dio and played on Jeff Scott Soto's other band Eyes's debut.

In 1992, Jacob played on a song with Lion's Share, "Nothing's Free", which was included on a Belgian compilation and in 1993 he was guest musician on ex-Candlemass singer Thomas Vikström's solo album If I Could Fly.

Vikström and Jacob had played together with guitar player Tommy Denander (Paul Stanley, Alice Cooper) and drummer Jake Samuel (The Poodles) in the cover band Horny Strings and Vikström also was a touring member of Talisman along with Jason Bieler from Saigon Kick. Later Vikström (Therion) took the lead singer role.

The same year Jacob was guest musician on the album Something Wicked Comes by Billionaires Boys Club, a band featuring ex-Accept guitarist Jörg Fischer and Jacob's former Yngwie Malmsteen bandmates Mark Boals and Anders Johansson.

In 1994, he played on The Johansson Brothers' self-titled album. Another band Jacob formed was Human Clay, together with Jeff Scott Soto. They recorded two albums. In 1996, Jacob played on Inspiration, a cover album recorded by Yngwie J. Malmsteen.

In the early 2000s, Jacob studied psychology at Stockholm University for a few years.

In 2005, Jacob was one of three new players to participate in the Swedish/German hard rock band Last Autumn's Dream, for its second studio album, along with drummer Jamie Borger and keyboarder Thomas Lassar. They were hired to replace John Levén, Ian Haugland and Mic Michaeli, who played on the debut album, but who could not make it this time due to taking part in the Europe reunion. Jacob also recorded with Last Autumn's Dream for five further studio albums, the latest being Dreamcatcher, which was released on 26 January 2009.

Jacob made his last appearance on record with the Swedish studio band Impulsia, on the album Expressions which was released on 24 September 2009 via Impulsia Music and under Riverside Records.

It has been reported that Jacob's birth name was Marcus Jacobsson, something he dismissed in an interview.

== Death ==
Jacob was found dead from suicide in his home in Kristineberg, Stockholm on 21 July 2009. He was 45 years old. Talisman vocalist Jeff Scott Soto issued the following statement: "It is with deep regret and remorse I, along with fellow members of Talisman, am announcing our brother, longtime colleague and overall greatest musician we've ever played with, Marcel Jacob, is no longer with us as of today, Tuesday July 21, 2009. Marcel killed himself after many years of personal and health issues he was battling."

== Discography ==
=== Yngwie Malmsteen ===
- Marching Out (1985)
- Inspiration (1996)
- Birth of the Sun/The Genesis (2002), Recorded 1980 (Member)

=== John Norum ===
- Total Control (1987) (Member and songwriter)
- Live in Stockholm EP (1988) (Member and songwriter)

=== Talisman ===
- Talisman (1990)
- Genesis (1993)
- Humanimal (1994)
- Humanimal Part II (1994)
- Five out of Five (1994)
- Life (1995)
- BESTerious (compilation) (1996)
- Best of... (compilation, different from above) (1996)
- Truth (1998)
- Live at Sweden Rock Festival (2001)
- Cats and Dogs (2003)
- Five Men Live (2005)
- 7 (2006)

=== Human Clay ===
- Human Clay (1996)
- u4ia (1997)
- Closing The Book (compilation, remaster) (2005, 2012)

=== Humanimal ===
- Humanimal (2002)
- Find My Way Home E.P. (2002)

=== Last Autumn's Dream ===
- II (2005)
- Winter in Paradise (2006)
- Saturn Skyline (2007)
- Impressions: The Very Best of LAD (Japanese market) (2007)
- Hunting Shadows (2007)
- Live in Germany 2007 (2008)
- Impressions: The Very Best of LAD (German market) (2008)
- Dreamcatcher (2009)
- A Touch of Heaven (2010)

=== Various artists ===
- Eyes – Eyes (1990)
- Bai Bang – Cop to Con (1991)
- Lion Share – Nothing's Free (1991)
- Thomas Vikstrom – If I Could Fly (1993)
- Billionaires Boys Club – Something Wicked Comes (1993)
- The Johansson Brothers – The Johansson Brothers (1994)
- Misery Loves Co. – Misery Loves Co. (1995)
- Meldrum – Loaded Mental Cannon (2001)
- Richard Andersson Space Odyssey – Embrace the Galaxy (2003)
- Radioactive: Yeah (2003)
- Jim Jidhed – Full Circle (2003)
- Edge of Forever – Feeding the Fire (Additional lead guitar on "Prisoner") (2004)
- Deacon Street Project – Deacon Street Project (2004)
- Bai Bang – The Best Of (2005)
- Sha Boom – The Race Is On (2005)
- Various Artists – United: Where Is The Fire DVD (2005)
- Locomotive Breath – Change of Track (2006)
- Speedy Gonzales – Electric Stalker (2006)
- The Poodles – Metal Will Stand Tall (Co-wrote "Kingdom of Heaven" with Jake Samuel) (2006)
- Impulsia – Expressions (2009)
- W.E.T.- W.E.T. (2009)

=== As producer ===
- Edge of Forever – Feeding the Fire (2004)
