= Jamie Borger =

Swedish drummer

- Birth name: Jan Peter Joacim Jamie Borger
- Also known as: Mr B
- Origin: Avesta, Sweden
- Genres: Rock, Hard rock, Heavy metal,
- Occupation: Drummer
- Website: Jamie Borger's official site

Jamie Borger (born 28 May 1964) is a Swedish drummer who has played in the bands Talisman, Treat and Last Autumn's Dream. Over the years, he also has recorded with Alfonzetti, Adam Thompson, Baltimoore, Human Clay, Swedish Erotica and Jeff Scott Soto.

He also be involved several unreleased groups like The Three Kings with Jeff Scott Soto and Swedish guitar player Goran Elmquist. A couple of their demos ("As I Do To You" and "This Ain't the Love") were used by Jeff Scott Soto on his Believe in Me E.P.

His musical influences include: Mick Tucker, Ian Paice, Bobby Rondinelli and Jeff Porcaro.

He is sponsored by Sonor Drums and Zildjian.

== Discography ==
=== with Talisman ===
- Humanimal Part II - 1994
- Humanimal - 1994
- Five out of Five (Live in Japan) - 1994
- Life - 1995
- Best of... (compilation, different from above) - 1996
- BESTerious (compilation) - 1996
- Truth - 1998
- Cats and Dogs - 2003
- Five Men Live - 2005
- 7 - 2006

=== CD singles edited with Talisman ===
- All + All (CD single) (1994)
- Todo y Todo (CD single) (All + All Latin American market release under nickname Genaro) (1994)
- Colour My XTC (CD single) (1994)
- Doing Time With My Baby (CD single) (1994)
- Frozen (CD single) (1995)
- Crazy (CD single) (1998)

=== with Last Autumn's Dream ===
- 2005 - II
- 2006 - Winter in Paradise
- 2007 - Saturn Skyline
- 2007 - Impressions: The Very Best of LAD (Japanese market)
- 2007 - Hunting Shadows
- 2008 - Live in Germany 2007
- 2008 - Impressions: The Very Best of LAD (German market)
- 2009 - Dreamcatcher

=== with Treat ===
- 1987 - Dreamhunter
- 1989 - Treat (UK compilation)
- 1989 - Organized Crime
- 1992 - Treat
- 2006 - Weapons of Choice 1984-2006
- 2008 - Scratch and Bite (Remaster) + Live at FireFest DVD
- 2010 - Coup De Grace
- 2016 - Ghost of Graceland

=== with Human Clay ===
- 1997 - u4ia
- 2005 - Closing the Book (remaster)

=== with Jeff Scott Soto ===
- 2002 - Believe in Me E.P.
- 2004 - Lost in the Translation
- 2006 - Essential Ballads
- 2012 - Damage Control

=== with Alfonzetti ===
- 2000 - Ready
- 2002 - Machine

=== with Swedish Erotica ===
- 1985 - Blindman's Justice

=== with Baltimoore ===
- 1992 - Double Density

=== Other recordings ===
- 2000 - Various Artist - A Tribute to Grand Funk Railroad
