= Chad Clark (drummer) =

American drummer

Chad Clark is an American drummer raised in Marshalltown, IA and based in Los Angeles. He is most known as the drummer for hard rock act Heaven Below, drummer/manager for hard rock act Lexington and was editor of the band's music video "Drowning". Clark has worked with members of Guns N' Roses, Methods of Mayhem, Puddle of Mudd, Disturbed, Goo Goo Dolls, The Rembrandts, Foreigner, Prong, CBS-TV's Rock Star House Band and been a member of Takara, Alligator Stew, Alex Masi Band, Rick Monroe, Joey Vera Band among many others. He is a long time endorser of Noble & Cooley drums.

Clark is currently working with producer and former Nelly Furtado guitarist Mike K and All-American Rejects keyboardist Kevin "Toad" Saulnier in a new group. A music video with new rock act Heaven Below was released in January 2008 featuring Clark, Marty O' Brien (Tommy Lee, Celine Dion, Disturbed) and Patrick Kennison (3-Faced, The Union Underground). Guitarist Dave Comer (Lexington) and bassist John Younger (DJ Ashba) have since joined Heaven Below. Dave Comer was then replaced by Jesse "Bawlz" Billson.

As of late 2010, Clark is no longer part of Heaven Below. He left due to musical differences.
