= Jeff Scott Soto =

American rock singer (born 1965)

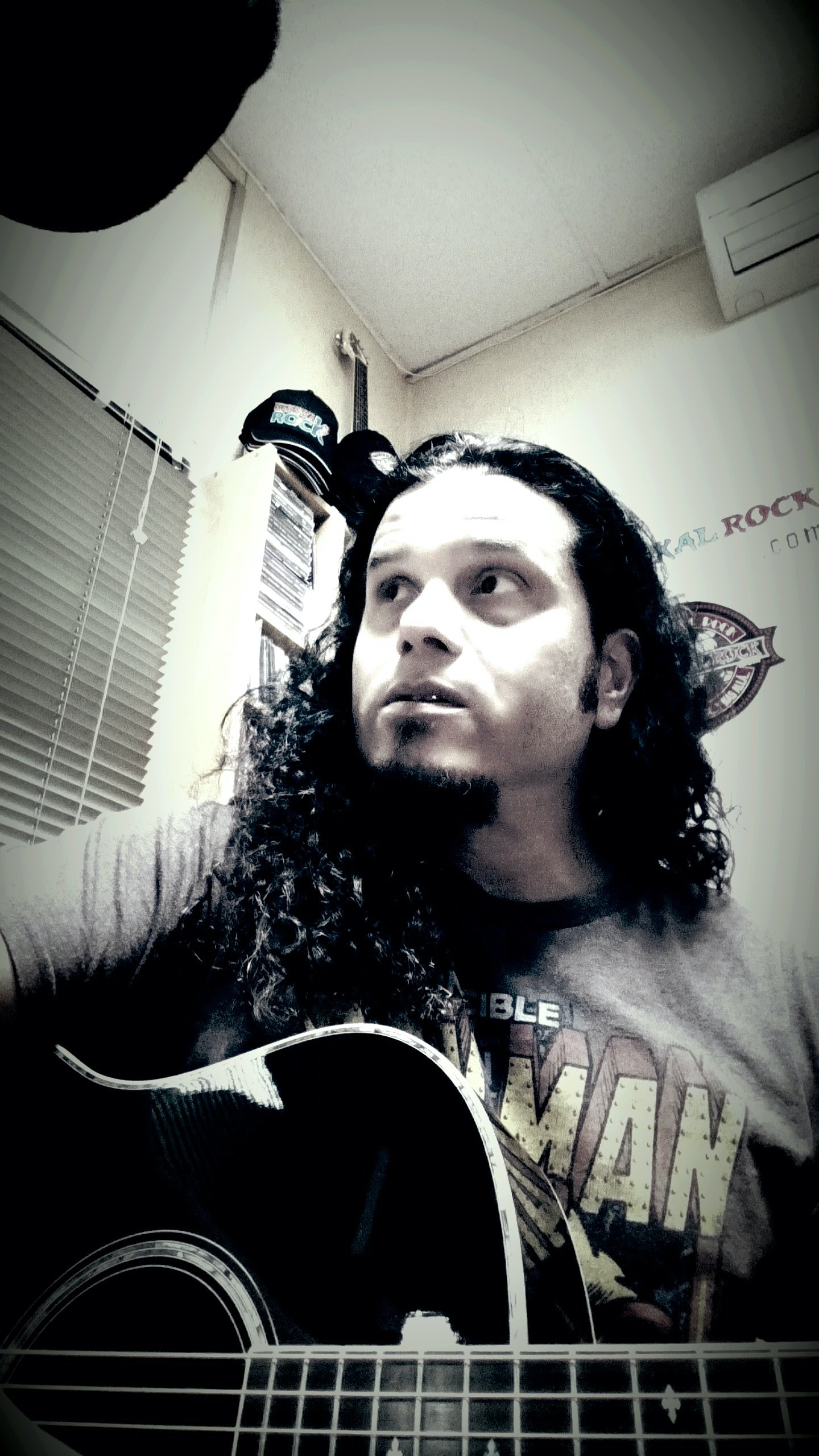
- Soto in 2023

Background information
- Born: November 4, 1965 (age 60); Brooklyn, New York, U.S.
- Genres: Hard rock; AOR; heavy metal; power metal
- Occupations: Singer; musician; songwriter
- Instruments: Vocals; guitar; keyboards
- Years active: 1983–present
- Labels: Frontiers; Rat Pak; Pavement
- Member of: Soto/Bieler; W.E.T.; Trans-Siberian Orchestra; Joel Hoekstra's 13; SOTO; Art of Anarchy
- Formerly of: List: Sons of Apollo; Yngwie Malmsteen; Kryst the Conqueror; Talisman; Eyes; Axel Rudi Pell; Takara; Human Clay; Humanimal; Redlist; Soul SirkUS; Journey; Steel Dragon
- Website: jeffscottsoto.com

Jeff Scott Soto (born November 4, 1965) is an American rock singer of Puerto Rican descent. He was the vocalist on Yngwie Malmsteen's first two albums, and the lead vocalist for Journey in 2006–07.

He sang lead vocals in the band Eyes as well as Sons of Apollo. He had a long tenure as front man of hard rock band Talisman. He works as a solo artist, with his self-named band SOTO, and as the vocalist of supergroups W.E.T. and Trans-Siberian Orchestra. In 2020, Jeff joined forces with the band Art of Anarchy on their Let There Be Anarchy album released in 2024. His style ranges from hard rock to power metal, influenced by classic soul singer Sam Cooke, Journey's Steve Perry, and Freddie Mercury of Queen.

== Career ==
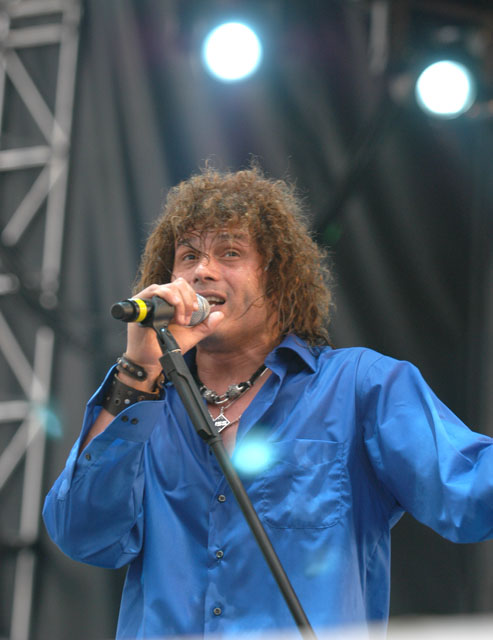
Soto performing in 2007

In 1982, after performing in several local cover bands, Soto recorded several songs as lead singer for the band Kanan. In 1984, Soto provided vocals for virtuoso guitarist Yngwie Malmsteen's debut album Rising Force and his next album Marching Out a year later.

Soto has performed with a wide variety of bands, including Panther, Axel Rudi Pell, Eyes, Talisman, Takara, Humanimal, Human Clay, Kryst The Conqueror, Redlist, Dewa 19, The Boogie Knights, Soul SirkUS and Octavision. As a session musician, Soto also performed backing vocals for artists such as Lita Ford, Steelheart, Glass Tiger, House of Lords, Stryper, and Saigon Kick.

He also sang for the fictional band Steel Dragon, which featured Zakk Wylde, Jeff Pilson and Jason Bonham for the soundtrack of the movie Rock Star along with Michael Matijevic of the band Steelheart, whose second album featured Soto on background vocals.

Soto performed at the 2000 annual OIQFC 'Freddie Mercury Birthday Party' at Reading in the UK, where he performed "Dragon Attack" with Brian May. Since then, Soto has joined Queen sideman Spike Edney's band, the Spike All Stars. Soto then appeared with Brian May and Roger Taylor at the 'Hollywood Walk of Fame' bash for the Official International Queen Fan Club.

In 2012, Taylor hired Soto as one of the four singers chosen for the official tribute band Queen Extravaganza. The band was formed via internet auditions and features Freddie Mercury soundalike Marc Martel. Soto and singer Yvan Pedneault were added to the lineup to augment the selected singers, in an effort to better emulate Queen songs live. However, Soto only did one tour with the group; they continued with a smaller production and line up.

Soto's solo album Damage Control was released on Frontiers Records in March 2012. His next venture was a band eponymously named SOTO, a new band where he could flex his muscles with a modern, Power Metal vibe. "Inside The Vertigo" was released on January 30, 2015, with earMUSIC. The album was co-written alongside Gus G, Mike Orlando and other members of his solo band at that time who were invited to the newly merged SOTO. In 2016, they released DIVAK on earMUSIC and embarked on a World Tour which included supporting Winery Dogs in May 2016 in South America. This support slot would serve as the chance for Winery Dogs drummer Mike Portnoy to 'scout' Soto for the venture that would become Sons of Apollo. SOTO recorded and released their third studio album 'Origami' in 2019 with new bassist Tony Dickinson, who replaced the recently deceased David Z, who died in 2017, as a touring member of Adrenaline Mob.

In 2015, Soto recorded vocals for Joel Hoekstra's 13, contributing to the album Dying to Live. Soto split vocal duties with Russell Allen on the album. In 2018, SOTO recorded their third album Origami, released in May 2019.

Soto released another solo album, Retribution in November 2017. In early 2020 he completed work on his 7th solo album as well as scheduled a live album for release in July. 2020 saw the release of 2 solo albums on Frontiers Records, "Jeff Scott Soto - Loud & Live In Milan 2019", recorded live at the annual Frontiers Rock Festival and "Wide Awake (In My Dreamland)" co-written and produced by Alessandro Del Vecchio. In 2021, he released an album titled "The Duets Collection - Volume 1" in which he re-recorded songs throughout his vast career as vocal duets with the likes of Eric Martin, Dino Jelusick, Russell Allen, Johnny Gioeli, Nathan James, Erik Martensson, and others on the Frontiers label. 2022 saw Soto release his seventh studio solo album "Complicated".

=== Talisman ===
Soto was one of the founding members of Talisman in 1989. He was in the group up until their disbandment in 2007. Talisman regrouped in December 2019 to record a tribute track for bassist Marcel Jacob on the 10th anniversary of his death.

=== Journey ===
In 2006, Soto replaced Steve Augeri in Journey after Augeri left the tour due to an acute throat infection. After months of being a tour replacement, Soto was officially hired as the band's singer in December 2006. However, the stint was short-lived, as he was fired from the band on June 12, 2007. Soto stated on his website "it seems they wanted something different than I brought to the table. No love lost though, they know what's best for the preservation of their legacy."

He later mentioned the gig did not work out because former vocalist Steve Perry was still alive and could hypothetically rejoin the band, hurting fan expectations of any replacement singers. Although he was officially introduced as the lead singer of Journey, the band has not mentioned Soto in recent lookbacks and biographies, skipping over him entirely for his replacement Arnel Pineda.

=== Trans-Siberian Orchestra ===
Soto joined Trans-Siberian Orchestra as a touring singer in 2008. Soto has continually toured with the group, stating "I will be a part of Trans-Siberian Orchestra as long as they'll have me."

=== W.E.T. ===
Alongside members of Work Of Art and Eclipse, Soto founded W.E.T., named after the initials of well known works by the band's members, Soto's being Talisman. W.E.T. released a self-titled debut album in November 2009. Since then they have released three more studio albums Rise Up (2013), Earthrage (2018) and Retransmission (2021). W.E.T. also released a live album Live One – In Stockholm (2014), however in interviews Soto has since said that W.E.T. never intends to tour and is primarily a studio project.

=== Sons of Apollo ===
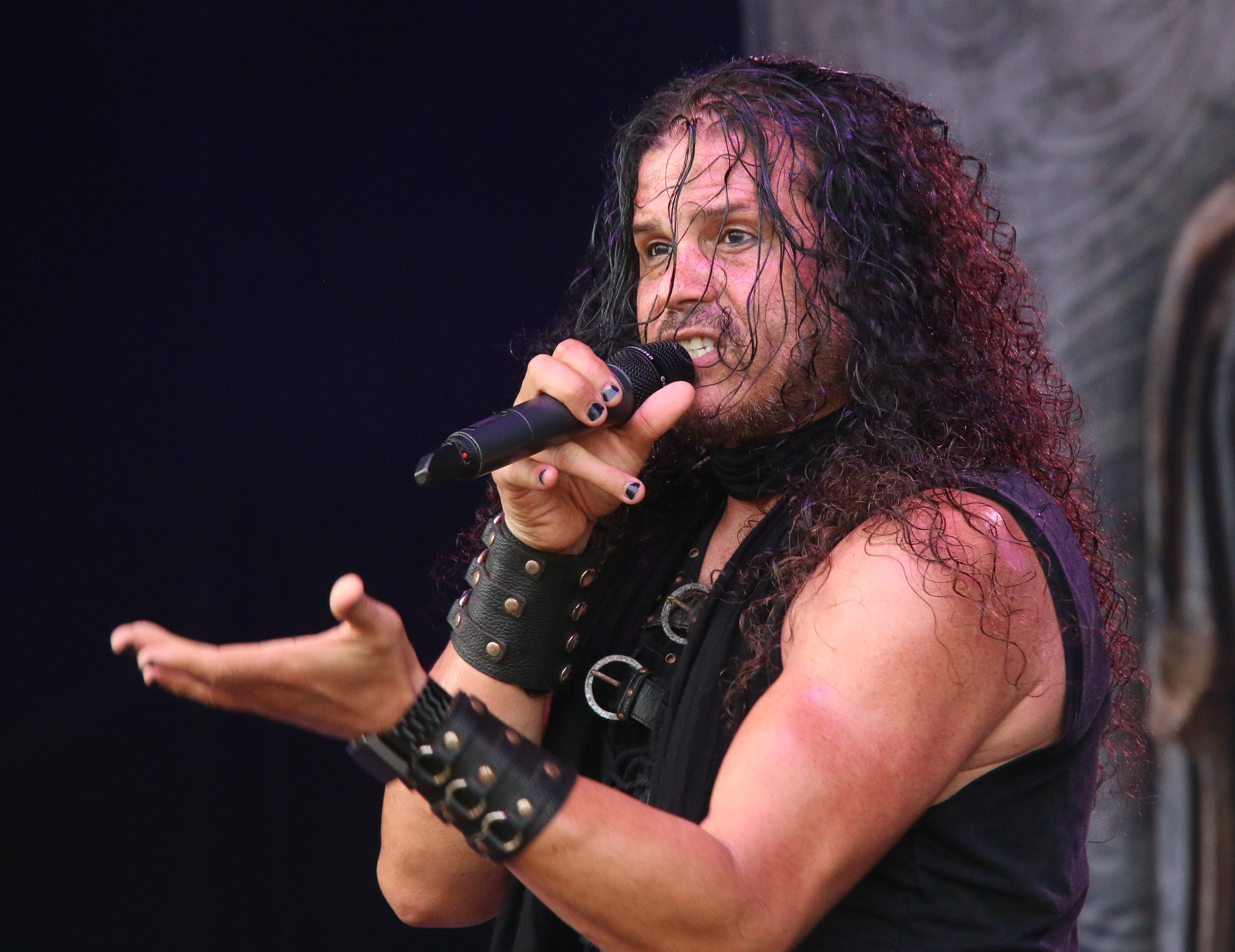
Soto with Sons of Apollo in 2018

In May 2017, he joined a progressive metal supergroup named Sons of Apollo with Derek Sherinian, bassist Billy Sheehan, drummer Mike Portnoy and guitarist Ron "Bumblefoot" Thal. Their debut album, Psychotic Symphony, was released October 20, 2017, with Inside Out/Sony.

After releasing a live DVD/album in 2019, 'Live With The Plovdiv Psychotic Symphony', Sons of Apollo released their second album MMXX in January 2020. They started the World Tour early 2020 but was interrupted 4 shows into their European tour by the COVID-19 outbreak.

=== Octavision ===
In 2020, alongside his Sons Of Apollo co-bandmate Billy Sheehan, Soto was invited by a Glendale, California based Armenian guitarist Hovak Alaverdyan to participate in his progressive metal project Octavision. There, Soto performed vocal duties on two tracks - "Coexist" and "Apocalyptus". The album titled Coexist was released on December 29, 2020.

== Personal life ==
Soto was born in Brooklyn, New York, his family moved to Los Angeles when he was a child. He spent his youth singing, learning trumpet and keyboards.

In 2012, he married his long-term girlfriend, Elena. He has a son from a previous marriage, and two step-children.

== Discography ==
=== Solo career ===
Studio albums

- Love Parade (1994)
- Holding On - EP (2002)
- Prism (2003)
- Lost in the Translation (2005)
- Believe in Me - EP (2006)
- Beautiful Mess (2009)
- Damage Control (2012)
- Retribution (2017)
- Wide Awake (In My Dreamland) (2020)
- The Duets Collection, Vol. 1 (2021)
- Complicated (2022)

Live albums

- JSS Live at the Gods 2002 (2003)
- Live at the Queen Convention 2003 (2004)
- One Night in Madrid (2009)
- Live at Firefest 2008 (2010)

Compilation albums

- Essential Ballads (2006)
- B-Sides (2006)

DVDs

- JSS Live at the Gods 2002 (2003)
- Live at the Queen Convention 2003 (2004)
- One Night In Madrid (2009)

=== with Yngwie Malmsteen's Rising Force ===
- Rising Force (1984)
- Marching Out (1985)
- Inspiration (1996)

Singles

- "Studio/Live '85" (1985)
- "I am a Viking" (Japan, 1985)

DVDs

- Live In Japan '85 (2015)

=== with Kryst the Conqueror ===
- Deliver Us From Evil (1989)

=== with Eyes ===
- Eyes (1990)
- Windows Of The Soul (1993)

Singles

- "Calling All Girls" (1990)
- "Nobody Said It Was Easy" (1990)

=== with Talisman ===
Studio albums

- Talisman (1990)
- Genesis - (1993)
- Humanimal (1994)
- Humanimal Part II (1994)
- Life (1995)
- Truth (1998)
- Cats and Dogs (2003)
- 7 (2006)

Live albums

- Five out of Five (Live in Japan) (1994)
- Live at Sweden Rock Festival (2001)
- Five Men Live (2005)

Compilation albums

- Best of... (1996)
- BESTerious (1996)
- Vaults (2015)

Singles

- "Just Between Us" (1990)
- "I'll be Waiting" (Sweden, 1990)
- "Mysterious (This Time is Serious)" (1993)
- "Time after Time" (1993)
- "Doing Time With My Baby" (1994)
- "Colour My XTC" (1994)
- "All + All" (1994)
- "Frozen" (1995)
- "Crazy" (1998)
- "Never Die (A Song For Marcel)" (2019)

DVDs

- The World's Best Kept Secret (2005)

=== with Axel Rudi Pell ===
- Eternal Prisoner (1992)
- The Ballads (1993)
- Between the Walls (1994)
- Made In Germany - Live (1995)
- Black Moon Pyramid (1996)
- Magic (1997)
- Magic Moments: 25th Anniversary Special Show - Live (2015)

Singles

- "Forever Young" (1994)
- "Cry of the Gypsy" (1994)

DVD / Blu-ray:

- Magic Moments: 25th Anniversary Special Show - Live (2015)

=== with Takara ===
- Eternal Faith (1993)
- Taste of Heaven (1995)
- Eternity: Best of 93 - 98 - Compilation (1998)
- Blind in Paradise (1998)

=== with Human Clay ===
- Human Clay (1996)
- u4ia (1997)
- Closing the Book on Human Clay (2003)
- The Complete Recordings (2015)

=== with Steel Dragon ===
- Rock Star (Music from the Motion Picture) (2001)

=== with Humanimal ===
- Humanimal (2002)
- Find My Way Home - EP (2002)

=== with Soul SirkUS ===
- World Play (2005)

=== with Redlist ===
- Ignorance (2007)

=== with W.E.T. ===
- W.E.T. (2009)
- Rise Up (2013)
- One Live in Stockholm (2014)
- Earthrage (2018)
- Retransmission (2021)
- Apex (2025)

Singles

- "One Love" (2009)
- "Comes Down Like Rain" (2009)
- "Brothers In Arms" (2009)
- "Learn to Live Again" (2012)
- "Love Heals" (2013)
- "Watch the Fire" (2018)
- "Big Boys Don't Cry" (2020)
- "Got to be About Love" (2020)

=== with Trans-Siberian Orchestra ===
- Night Castle (2009)
- Letters From the Labyrinth (2015)

=== with SOTO ===
- Inside the Vertigo (2015)
- Divak (2016)
- Origami (2019)
- Revision (2020)

=== with Joel Hoekstra's 13 ===
- Dying to Live (2015)
- Running Games (2021)

=== with Sons of Apollo ===
- Psychotic Symphony (2017)
- Alive / Tengo Vida - EP (2018)
- Live With The Plovdiv Psychotic Symphony (2019)
- MMXX (2020)

=== with Art of Anarchy ===
- Let There Be Anarchy (2024)

=== with Ellefson-Soto ===
- Vacation in the Underworld (2022)
- Unbreakable (2025)

=== Guest appearances – lead vocals ===
- Threshold - Threshold - 1983
- Panther - Panther - 1986
- Dragonne - On Dragons Wings - 1988
- Kuni - Lookin' For Action - 1988
- Alex Masi - Attack Of The Neon Shark - 1989
- Skrapp Mettle - Sensitive - 1991
- Rich Girl - Rich Girl: Original Soundtrack Unreleased - 1991
- Biker Mice From Mars - Biker Mice From Mars: Original Soundtrack - 1993
- Da Black Side Brown - Da Black Side Brown - 1994
- Gary Schutt - Sentimetal - 1994
- Hollywood Underground - Hollywood Underground - 1996
- Yngwie Malmsteen - Inspiration - 1996
- The Boogie Knights - Welcome To The Jungle Boogie - 1997
- Ken Tamplin And Friends - Wake The Nations - 2003
- Chris Catena - Freak Out! - 2003
- Christian Rivel's Audiovision - The Calling - 2003
- Laudamus - Lost In Vain - 2003
- Roger Sause - Freestyle Funk - 2004
- Edge of Forever - Feeding The Fire - 2004
- Michael Schenker - Heavy Hitters - Doctor Doctor: The Kulick Sessions - By Invitation Only - 2005
- Jorge Salán - Chronicles of an Evolution - 2007
- Tempestt - Bring 'Em On - 2007
- Taka Minamino - AngelWing - 2009
- Jorge Salán - Estatuas en la calle - 2010
- Danger Angel - Danger Angel - 2010
- Jane Bogaert - Fifth Dimension - 2010
- Last Autumn's Dream – A Touch of Heaven - 2010
- "The Flames Still Burns" - from "Ballroom Hamburg — A Decade of Rock" compilation (2010)
- Pushking - The World as We Love it - 2011
- Evolution - Evolution - 2011
- Talon - III - 2011
- Mitch Malloy - II - 2011
- Wolfpakk - Wolfpakk - 2011
- Last Autumn's Dream - Nine Lives - 2011
- Koritni - Welcome To The Crossroads - 2012
- Reign of the Architect - Rise - 2012
- AOR - The Secrets Of L.A - 2013
- The Dave K Project - Resurrection / True Lies - 2013
- Gus G - I Am The Fire - "Summer Days" - 2014
- Gus G - Brand New Revolution - 2015
- Joel Hoekstra - Dying To Live - 2015
- AOR - L.A. Darkness - 2016
- Lita Ford - Time Capsule - 2016
- Lola Astanova - Freedom - 2016
- RTfact - Life is Good- 2017
- Brad Jurgens - Deranged- 2017
- Band of Brothers - Band of Brothers- 2017
- HighWay - "Wake Up" - 2017
- Jason Bieler - Hope & Strife E.P. - 2018
- Jimmy Waldo & Steven Rosen - Voices From The Past - 2018
- Schubert In Rock - Commander of Pain - 2018
- Octavision - Coexist - 2020
- Black Maze Rose - Black Maze Rose (on "Laws Of Attraction") - 2020
- Jason Bieler - Songs for the Apocalypse - 2021
- Star One - Revel in Time (on "Back from the Past") - 2022
- Sky Empire - The Shifting Tectonic Plates of Power - Part One - 2023
- D'Luna - Monster - 2024
- Shakespeare's Macbeth a rock opera, lead vocals as Macbeth-2025

=== Various Artists tributes albums ===
- Smoke On The Water: A Tribute to Deep Purple (1994): "Hush"
- Dragon Attack: A Tribute to Queen (1996): "Save Me "
- Hot For Remixes: Tribute to Van Halen (1999): "So This Is Love (Sheep On Drugs Remix)"
- Head Soup: A Tribute to Ozzy Osbourne (2000): "Shot In The Dark"
- Little Guitars: A Tribute to Van Halen (2000): "So This Is Love" (Re-released)
- Tribute To Aerosmith: Let The Tribute Do The Talkin' (2001): "Cryin'"
- An All-Star Lineup Performing The Songs of Pink Floyd (2002): "Us & Them"
- Warmth In The Wilderness: A Tribute to Jason Becker (2002): "Desert Island"
- We Salute You: A Tribute to AC/DC (2004): "Problem Child"
- Numbers from the Beast: An All-Star Salute to Iron Maiden (2004): "Aces High"
- The Sweet According to Sweden: A Tribute to The Sweet (2004): "Love Is Like Oxygen"
- 24/7/365: The Tribute to Led Zeppelin (2004): "Royal Orleans"
- The Crown Jewels: A Tribute to Queen (2005): "We Will Rock You"
- '80s Metal Tribute to Van Halen (2006): "So This Is Love" (Re-released)
- Butchering The Beatles (2006): "Magical Mystery Tour"

=== Guest appearances – backing vocals ===
- Rated X - Matter Of Time E.P. - 1987 (Uncredited)
- House of Lords - House of Lords - 1988
- Glass Tiger - Simple Mission - 1990
- Stryper - Against the Law - 1990
- Stryper - Can't Stop the Rock - 1991
- Saigon Kick - Saigon Kick - 1991
- Lita Ford - Dangerous Curves - 1991
- McQueen Street - McQueen Street - 1991
- Randy Jackson's China Rain - Bed of Nails - 1991
- Steelheart - Tangled in Reins - 1992
- Babylon A.D. - Nothing Sacred - 1992
- Lita Ford - Black - 1992
- Mitch Malloy - Mitch Malloy - 1992
- Slaughter - The Wild Life - 1992
- Pariah - To Mock a Killingbird - 1993
- Thomas Vikstrom - If I Could Fly - 1993
- Monster - Through The Eyes of the World - 1995
- Amalgan - Delicate Stretch of the Seems - 1997
- Paul Gilbert - Alligator Farm - 1997
- Fergie Frederiksen - Equilibrium - 1999
- Neil Turbin - Threatcon Delta - 2003
- Takara - Invitation to Forever - 2008
- Dokken - Lightning Strikes Again - 2008
- Mad Max - Here We Are - 2008
- Danger Angel - Revolutia - 2013
- Danger Angel - All The King's Horses - 2016
- Beg, Borrow & Steal - Push And Shove (The Lost Album) - 2017 (Recorded in 1991) (Uncredited)
- Ronnie Montrose - 10 x 10 - 2017: on "Still Singin' With The Band" and "I'm Not Lying"
- Harem Scarem - United - 2017
- Big Clyde - Freakin' Out - 2022

=== Guest songwriting ===
- Khymera - A New Promise - 2005: "You Can't Take Me (Away from You)"
- Uriah Heep - Living The Dream - 2018: "Grazed By Heaven"
- Uriah Heep - Chaos & Colour" - 2023: "Save Me Tonight"

=== As producer ===
- Spektra - Overload - 2021

== Sources ==
- Daniels, Neil (2011). The Untold Story of Journey. London: Omnibus Press. ISBN 978-1-84938-657-9.
