= Talisman (band) =

Swedish hard rock band

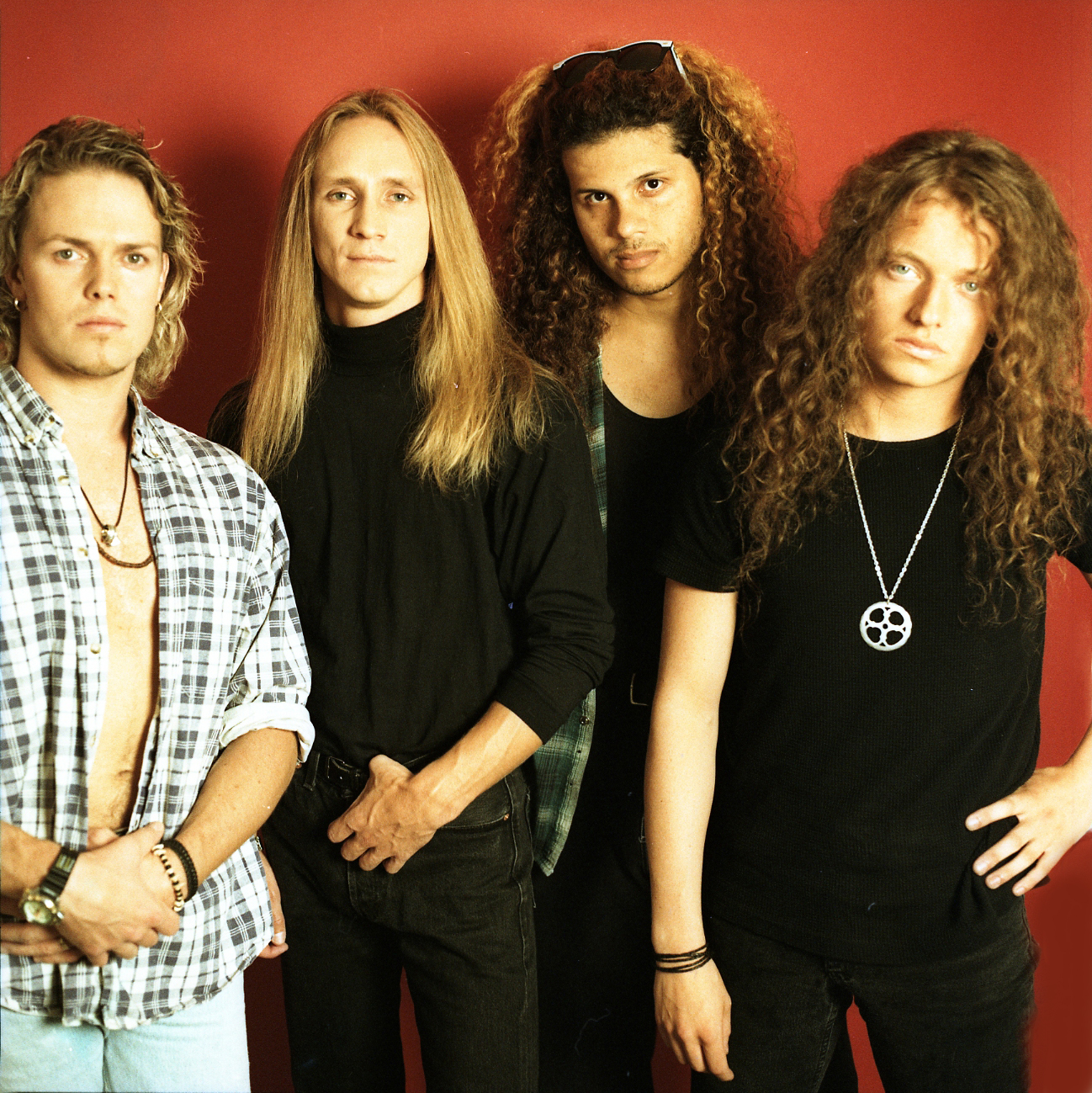
- Talisman in 1994

Background information
- Origin: Stockholm, Sweden
- Genre: Hard rock
- Years active: 1989−2007 (reunions: 2014, 2016, 2017, 2019, 2024)
- Labels: Frontiers, Electra, Airplay, Dino, Empire, GMR, Sun Hill
- Past members: (see below)
- Website: talismanmusic.se

Talisman was a Swedish hard rock band. Founded in 1989 by the songwriting bassist Marcel Jacob and fronted by the American singer Jeff Scott Soto, the band released seven studio albums from 1990 to 2006, before going on a farewell tour in 2007. While mainly described as hard rock and heavy metal, the band's sound had also been influenced by a variety of genres outside the rock music scope, such as rhythm and blues, soul, and funk in particular.

After Marcel Jacob died in 2009, Talisman has reunited three times for one-off festival shows held in 2014, 2016, and 2017 with Johan Niemann filling in on bass. In 2019, to mark a ten-year anniversary of Marcel Jacob's passing, Talisman reunited once again to record and release a commemorative song "Never Die". Five years later, in January 2024, the band released another newly recorded song "Save Our Love", celebrating what would have been Marcel Jacob's 60th birthday and the band's legacy.

== History ==
=== Formation ===
Talisman was formed by bass player Marcel Jacob, who had previously played with: Yngwie Malmsteen's Rising Force, John Norum Group and Power. Jacob found himself with record label interest but no band after John Norum rejected the songs that Jacob worked on which he thought would end up on Norum's second solo album. So, he contacted Jeff Scott Soto who was interested in what Jacob had done. Once the songs were completed and mixed Marcel changed the working title for his solo project from Guitars on Fire to Talisman.

Recordings for the first album took place in Stockholm in February 1989. Jacob programmed some drums and played all rhythm guitars with the help of the producer Mats Lindfors on "Women, Whiskey and Songs".

=== 1990s ===
Just when the mixing was finished the album's release was delayed. Meanwhile, Soto's US-based project Eyes got signed and Jacob left for Los Angeles to help Eyes demo and record what would be their first release. During this time an employee of the label that had originally signed Talisman moved to a new label and the masters of the first album were bought from the bankrupt label. So Talisman was eventually released in February 1990 on the Airplay/Vinyl Mania label. The first single "I'll Be Waiting" reached number 2 in Sweden's singles chart and 33,000 copies of the album were sold in two months in Sweden.

Live the band featured: Jason Bieler on guitar (Saigon Kick), Jakob "Jake Samuel" Samuelsson on drums and Thomas Vikström on keyboards and backing vocals. Talisman was one of the top ten drawing acts in Sweden that summer. Unfortunately, the label went bust – ending any chances of international exposure for the album.

Following the summer of 1990 Soto signed to the Pasha label with Eyes, Bieler was enjoying some success with Saigon Kick, and Jacob signed to Warner Sweden. A trip to the US and the UK followed, looking for talent but without success. After a few auditions back home Jacob chose then 19-year-old guitar player Fredrik Åkesson.

Eventually Marcel met again Matti Alfonzetti (an old acquaintance from grade school) and they started writing and recording together in 1992. However, a change in personnel at Warner resulted in Talisman leaving that label and spending most of 1992 looking for a new label, Alfonzetti left to join Skin Trade.

Christer Wedin was interested in releasing a second Talisman album if Soto was available. Soto agreed and the band returned to the studio. The new album "Genesis" was recorded in three weeks in December 1992 at Stocksund Recording Studios. Soto joined the recording along with his then-girlfriend Julie Greaux (Billy Idol, Axel Rudi Pell) who ended up playing the grand piano on "All I Want". In conjunction with the release of "Genesis" early 1993 Dino Music re-released the first album Talisman adding six live tracks recorded in Sweden in 1990. When "Genesis" was released the single "Mysterious" got some airplay and the album immediately sold more than 15,000 copies in Sweden. Furthermore, both Talisman and Genesis garnered some international interest throughout Europe and Japan.

The band did a club tour in Sweden in March with Julie Greaux on keyboards and Jake Samuel back again on drums. While the band was planning a tour in Japan Samuel left again to pursue a singing career. The new drummer was Jamie Borger from Treat.

After the end of the European tour in early October Jamie and Marcel spent the following two months in a rehearsal studio in Upplands Väsby, just outside Stockholm writing, playing bits of music, improvising arrangements, learning the new stuff and collecting tons of material.

Jeff joined the guys In January 1994 and the band recorded and mixed the new album Humanimal at Sound Trade Studios in Stockholm. Additional musicians on Humanimal included Julie Greaux as backing vocalist and the sound engineer Ronny Lahti playing the funky wah guitar on "Seasons".

The band was pleased with the recordings (22 tracks recorded and mixed in 22 days) and Jeff and Marcel chose the set of the songs to be on the album. Meanwhile Japanese label Zero was allowed to put together their own version of the album suitable for the Japanese audience. The German version by Polydor was different from the Swedish version featuring "Hypocrite" as bonus track. The Japanese had to release the Swedish version too because of the amount of imports. In Europe a second version was released with the outtakes from the first one. Humanimal was greeted with great enthusiasm thanks to a successful combination of metal, funky and pop influences. It is still the favourite album of fans and of more than one member in the band. No touring was done for the album.

Marcel and Jeff worked together in Los Angeles in 1995 to write the songs for the next album Life. Jamie recorded drums at Park Studios. The tapes were then sent to Jeff so that he could record the bulk of the vocals at home. The original mixing took place in the same studio where Genesis was recorded. The Swedish record company and the band were not pleased with the final mix that went to Japan to meet their release date. The album was remixed by Mats Lindfors and Christer Wedin for the European version. Talisman was not able to tour supporting the album.

Talisman took a break for three years, with Jeff, Boogie Knights, and Marcel established a short-lived side-project, Human Clay, which existed between 1996 and 1997, and recorded such albums as Human Clay (1996) and u4ia (1997).

Talisman also had the chance to play a couple of gigs and to open up for Yngwie Malmsteen in Stockholm with Pontus Norgren on guitar.

The band was requested by Christer Wedin (Empire Records) to do a new Talisman album In 1998. Marcel travelled to Los Angeles to write songs with Jeff. Jamie and Pontus joined the guys a few days later to rehearse and record drums in a small studio and do overdubs in Jeff's home studio. The new album "Truth" was recorded with help from John Ellis (Prism Sound Studios, Boston). The album included a range of covers: "Darling Nikki" of Prince, "Let me entertain you" of Queen and "Frozen" of Madonna (which apparently became very popular in clubs in Germany). Once again there was no touring done for the album.

=== 2000s ===
DJ Dr. Rock from the Swedish Radio Rock Klassiker persuaded the band to perform at Sweden Rock Festival. When Talisman played in Stockholm two nights before the festival gig Marcel's entire kit (bass included!) was left at the venue. Marcel wanted to leave the festival but decided to stay for the fans . The show went great and Christer Wedin managed to get it recorded as well.. Marce's sound at the show was not too exciting and some out-of-tuned guitars needed some fixing so he and Pontus went into the studio to record live together the entire show exactly the same way they would have done it on stage. The live album was released in October 2002 in Sweden only through Empire Records, charting at number 18 the first week. In the same year the entire back catalogue of Talisman was re-issued with bonus tracks on Frontline Records in Brazil.

Jeff, Marcel and Pontus later joined established a short-lived music project Humananimal (2002–2003) with drummer Tomas Broman (Great King Rat, Electric Boys, Amaze Me) and released the self-titled debut album of Humanimal in 2002. The band's name idea come from Marcel Jacob who used the following quote: "...we might be human but in the end, we still being animals". The main idea was to have a hard rock record with three singers: Leif Sundin (Great King Rat, John Norum, Michael Schenker Group), Jeff Scott Soto (Talisman, ex-Yngwie Malmsteen) and Mats Levén (Krux, At Vance, ex-Yngwie Malmsteen). After some research and testing, they decided to go with one singer, because they also thought it would be easier for the listeners if they only used one, and well they chose Jeff Scott Soto. After that, again Norgren and Jacob were thinking about who could be the best drummer that they should use for that kind of musical project and they chose Tomas Broman (Great King Rat, Electric Boys, Amaze Me, Hughes Turner Project, Glenn Hughes). They released their only record on January 28, 2002 in USA and February 1 in Europe, but by popular demand the record label made a second edition to reach at least three European countries. Also on June 17, 2002, the record label released a 3-track EP called "Find My Way Home". In May the band played a couple of shows to support it. After some personal, professional and legal problems, Pontus and Marcel had a falling-out and Pontus was out both of Talisman and Humanimal, then on October 19 of that year, Humanimal split. On June 14, 2019, another record label Sun Hill Production re-released the complete Humanimal album to all digital platforms as well on CD.

In May, the band played a couple of support shows. Pontus and Marcel had a falling out and this meant that Pontus was out both of Talisman and Humanimal. Marcel and Jeff had a meeting with Christer Wedin who explained that they were basically free to go into business without him. Since Jeff had already signed a deal with the Italian label Frontiers for his solo album Love Parade he talked to them about doing a new Talisman album. Humanimal was a musical project featuring Pontus Norgren (Great King Rat) and Marcel Jacob (Talisman).

Jeff had had Howie Simon playing on his solo album and was now trying to persuade Marcel to involve him. Jamie was at the same time pushing to get Fredrik back in the band. It ended up with Fredrik back in the studio and Howie joining the band for some live gigs.

Christer Wedin was contacted by an Italian recording studio willing to let Talisman use the studio for free so they spent two weeks' time at the Music Planet Recording Studio in Acqui Terme, near Turin with Jeff being in charge of everything in terms of logistics and dealing with Frontiers.

Marcel and Jeff flew to Boston (after having finished in the studio) where they worked with engineer and friend John Ellis for the second time. John did the final mixes without Marcel and Jeff.

"Cats and Dogs" was released in May 2003 and a tour in Europe took place in the following months.

The entire back catalogue of Talisman was re-mastered and re-issued through GMR Music Group Sweden, complete with bonus tracks, demos, live gigs, promotional videos, and liner notes.

Talisman launched a double DVD package "World's Best Kept Secret" which coincided with the 15th anniversary of the release of the first Talisman album in March 2005 through Frontiers Records . The set comprised two complete shows from the "Cats and Dogs" tour in 2003, all of the band's promotional videos, and an instructional video from Marcel Jacob. A double live album Five Men Live was also released at the same time.

Jeff, Marcel, Jamie and Fredrik worked on a brand new Talisman album called "7" for about nine months starting from the end of 2005 . The release was due on 20 October on Frontiers Records with a Japanese release on King Records. The working title was "BAR" which stood for "Bitter-Angry-Resentful" — basically a joke referring to their outlook on certain life events. They opted for the more straightforward title "7". All songs were written by Marcel and Jeff except "Shed a tear goodbye" which was written by Jamie and Jeff. "7" was recorded at XTC Studios in Älvsjö and at Mahatma Gandhi Location in Stockholm, with all the vocals done at the Hampton in Northridge, California. Marcel handled all guitars (except leads) and keyboards. The album includes 11 tracks and was mixed by Pontus Norgren, who also guested on "Final curtain" (the bonus-track on the Japanese release.)

The band was supposed to do a tour in September/October 2006 hitting Germany, Greece, Belgium, Italy and Spain but everything was delayed due to Soto's commitment in Journey. Jeff Scott Soto was officially announced as the lead singer for Journey on 19 December 2006. The following year he was dismissed from the band.

Talisman planned to do their final performances in early 2007, but the band subsequently dissolved on account of Jacob's health. Jacob committed suicide on 21 July 2009 (aged 45) after suffering from personal and health problems, effectively ending any chance of the band reforming.

The first four Talisman albums are re-released in Digipack editions including new liner notes with personal comments from Jeff along with previously unreleased pics and audio material in November 2012. The self-titled debut featured two new live bonus recordings and a bass solo studio instrumental track. On the "Genesis" album four demos from 1990 were revisited with new drums and guitar recordings. Jamie, Fredrik and Pontus honor Marcel's music by putting new sound to the recordings in the summer of 2012. "Five out of Five – Live In Japan" now just named "Live In Japan" received some additional music and a completely new mix with the use of today's technology. "The Humanimal" is a mix from the earlier "Humanimal part 1 and 2".

The band performed a one-off show on 6 June 2014 at the Sweden Rock Festival.

Talisman released its first new song in 12 years—a song called "Never Die (a song for Marcel)"—on 20 December 2019 with proceeds from this recording going to suicide and mental illness prevention and awareness in cooperation with Suicide Zero organization.

Five years later, in January 2024, the band released another newly recorded song "Save Our Love", celebrating what would have been Marcel Jacob's 60th birthday and the band's legacy.

== Band members ==
Vocals

- Göran Edman (1989) Demo tapes
- Jeff Scott Soto (1989–2007, 2014, 2019)

Guitar

- Christopher Ståhl (1989)
- Mats Lindfors (1989–1990)
- Jason Bieler (1990–1992)
- Fredrik Åkesson (1992–1993, 1994–1995, 2002–2003, 2003–2007)
- Ronni Lahti (1994)
- Pontus Norgren (1995–2002, 2014, 2019)
- Howie Simon (2003)

Bass

- Marcel Jacob (1989−2007; died 2009)
- Johan Niemann (2014, 2019)

Keyboards

- Mats Olausson (1989–1990; died 2015)
- Thomas Vikström (1990–1992)
- Julie Greaux (1992–1994)
- Thomas Ahlstrand (1994–2007)
- BJ (2014, 2019)

Drums

- Peter Hermansson (1989–1990)
- Jakob Samuel (1990–1993)
- Jamie Borger (1993–2007, 2014, 2019)

== Discography ==
=== Studio albums ===
Date	Title	Re-issue Date	Re-release
1990	Talisman	2003, 2012	Talisman (Deluxe Edition)
1993	Genesis	2003, 2012	Genesis (Deluxe Edition)
1994	Humanimal Part 1	2012	Humanimal (Part 1 & Part 2)
1994	Humanimal Part 2	2012	Humanimal (Part 1 & Part 2)
1995	Life	2013	Life (Deluxe Edition)
1998	Truth	2013	Truth (Deluxe Edition)
2003	Cats and Dogs		
2006	7		

=== Live albums ===
Date	Title	Re-issue Date	Re-issue
1994	Five out of Five (Live in Japan)	2012	Live in Japan (Deluxe Edition)
2002	Live at Sweden Rock Festival	2013	Live At Sweden Rock Festival 2001 & 2003 (Deluxe Edition)
2005	Five Men Live	2013	Live At Sweden Rock Festival 2001 & 2003 (Deluxe Edition)
2005	Five Men Live	2015	Live In Stockholm (CD/DVD) (Deluxe Edition)

=== Compilations ===
- 1996: Best Of... (Swedish, Scandinavian & European compilation)
- 1996: BESTerious (Japanese compilation)
- 2015: Vaults (2CD compilation with demo versions features vocals from Jeff Scott Soto, Goran Edman, Matti Alfonzetti, Thomas Vikstrom and Stefan Berggren)

=== DVDs ===
- 2005: The World's Best Kept Secret
- 2005: Various Artists – United: Where Is The Fire DVD

=== Singles and promos ===
- 1990: "I'll Be Waiting" (7" single)
- 1990: "I'll Be Waiting" (CD single)
- 1990: "Just Between Us"
- 1993: "Time After Time"
- 1993: "Mysterious (This Time It's Serious)"
- 1994: "All + All"
- 1994: "Todo y Todo" ("All + All" Latin American release under nickname Genaro)
- 1994: "Colour My XTC"
- 1994: "Doing Time with My Baby" (German release)
- 1995: "Frozen" (German radio release, not released commercially)
- 1998: "Crazy" (Sweden radio release, not released commercially)
- 2019: "Never Die (A Song for Marcel)" (digital release, limited 7" vinyl)
- 2024: "Save Our Love"
