= Bryn Jones discography =

- Studio albums: 135
- Extended plays: 43
- Live albums: 1
- Compilation albums: 20
- Tribute albums: 3
- Box sets: 3
- Expanded reissues: 15
- Remixes: 15
- Compilation tracks: 42

This is the discography of British electronic musician Bryn Jones as E.g Oblique Graph and Muslimgauze.

Plain reissues and compilation tracks taken from albums are not included.

== as E.g Oblique Graph ==
Year	Title	Label	Note
1981	Tape 1		
1981	Tape 2		
1981	Language Tape		
1982	Extended Play	Kinematograph Tapes	
1982	Piano Room	Kinematograph Tapes	
1982	Triptych	Recloose Organisation	
1983	Inhalt	Kinematograph Tapes	
2002	Completely Oblique	Pretentious	aka Complete Oblique

== as Muslimgauze ==
=== Studio albums ===
Year	Title	Label	Note
1983	Kabul	Product Kinematograph	
1983	Opaques	Product Kinematograph	
1984	Hunting Out with an Aerial Eye	Limited Editions	
1984	Buddhist on Fire	Recloose Organisation	
1985	Blinded Horses	Limited Editions	
1986	Flajelata	Limited Editions	
1986	Hajj	Limited Editions	
1987	Jazirat-Ul-Arab	Limited Editions	
1987	Abu Nidal	Limited Editions	
1987	Coup d'etat	Permis de Constuire	
1988	The Rape of Palestine	Limited Editions	
1989	Uzi	Parade Amoureuse	
1990	Intifaxa	Extreme	
1991	United States of Islam	Extreme	
1992	Zul'm	Extreme	
1993	Vote Hezbollah	Soleilmoon	
1993	Hamas Arc	Staalplaat	
1993	Satyajit Eye	Staalplaat	
1993	Betrayal	Staalplaat	
1993	Veiled Sisters	Soleilmoon	
1994	Emak Bakia	Concrete	
1994	Citadel	Extreme	
1994	Zealot	Staalplaat	
1994	Blue Mosque	Staalplaat	
1994	Al-Zulfiquar Shaheed	T.4	
1995	Salaam Alekum, Bastard	Soleilmoon	
1995	Maroon	Staalplaat	
1995	Silknoose	Daft	
1995	Izlamaphobia	Staalplaat	
1996	Gun Aramaic	Soleilmoon	
1996	Gun Aramaic Part 2	Soleilmoon	
1996	Azzazin	Staalplaat	
1996	Return of Black September	Staalplaat	
1996	Occupied Territories	Staalplaat	
1996	Re-Mixs	Soleilmoon	
1996	Uzbekistani Bizzare and Souk	Staalplaat	
1996	Deceiver	Staalplaat	
1996	Arab Quarter	Soleilmoon	
1996	Fatah Guerrilla	Staalplaat	
1997	Narcotic	Staalplaat	
1997	City of Djinn	Third Eye Music	with The Rootsman
1997	Jaal Ab Dullah	Soleilmoon	
1997	Sandtrafikar	Staalplaat	
1997	Zuriff Moussa	Staalplaat	
1997	Farouk Enjineer	Soleilmoon	
1998	Vampire of Tehran	Staalplaat	
1998	Lahore & Marseille	Soleilmoon	
1998	Syrinjia	Soleilmoon	
1998	Mort Aux Vaches	Staalplaat	
1998	Mazar-I-Sharif	Soleilmoon	
1998	Sonar vs Muslimgauze	Daft	with Sonar
1998	Mullah Said	Staalplaat	
1998	In Search of Ahmad Shah Masood	Staalplaat	
1998	Remixs Vol. 2	Soleilmoon	
1998	Fedayeen	Staalplaat / EARLabs	
1998	Dark Thoughts	D.O.R.	with Apollon
1998	Remixs Vol 3	Staalplaat	
1999	Muslimgauze vs Species of Fishes	Fishes	with Species of Fishes
1999	Hussein Mahmood Jeeb Tehar Gass	Soleilmoon	
1999	Return to the City of Djinn	Third Eye Music	with The Rootsman
1999	Observe with Sadiq Bey	Staalplaat	
1999	Fakir Sind	Soleilmoon	
1999	Hand of Fatima	Soleilmoon	
1999	Azad	Staalplaat	
1999	Lo-Fi India Abuse	BSI Records	
1999	Bass Communion V Muslimgauze	Soleilmoon	with Bass Communion
1999	Year Zero	D.O.R.	with Apollon
2000	Sufiq	Soleilmoon	
2000	Baghdad	Staalplaat	
2000	New Soul	3rd Stone	with Reverberation
2000	Jebel Tariq	Staalplaat / Pretentious	
2000	Your Mines in Kabul	Staalplaat	
2000	Abu-Dis	D.O.R.	
2001	Muslimgauze	Staalplaat	
2001	The Suns of Arqa Mixes	Arka Sound	with Suns of Arqa
2001	Kashmiri Queens	Staalplaat	
2001	Eye for an Eye	Staalplaat	
2002	Hummus	Soleilmoon	
2002	Hamas Cinema Gaza Strip	Staalplaat	
2002	Sarin Israel Nes Ziona	Staalplaat	
2002	Dar Es Salaam	Hidden Art	
2002	Veiled Sisters Remix	Soleilmoon	
2003	Iranair Inflight Magazine	Staalplaat	
2003	Arabbox	Soleilmoon	
2003	Dome of the Rock	Ant-Zen	
2003	Red Madrassa	Staalplaat	
2003	Alms for Iraq	Soleilmoon	
2005	No Human Rights for Arabs in Israel: The Remix	Staalplaat	
2006	Speaker of Turkish	Soleilmoon	
2008	Wish of the Flayed	Muslimtapes	aka AR80
2008	Jah-Mearab	Staalplaat	
2009	Sulaymaniyah	Staalplaat	
2009	Sycophant of Purdah	Staalplaat	
2009	Cobra Head Soup	Staalplaat	
2009	Madrass Sitar Burner	Staalplaat	
2010	Babylon Iz Iraq	Muslimtapes	
2010	Damascus	Staalplaat	
2010	Lazhareem Ul Leper	Staalplaat	
2010	Camel Through a Needles Eye	The Muslimgauze Preservation Society	
2011	Beirut Transister	Staalplaat	
2011	On-line Jihad	The Muslimgauze Preservation Society	with The Rootsman
2011	In Search of the Abraham Mosque	The Muslimgauze Preservation Society	
2011	Fuck Israel	The Muslimgauze Preservation Society	with The Rootsman
2012	Souk Bou Saada	Staalplaat	
2013	Al Jar Zia Audio	Staalplaat	
2013	Islamic Songs	Staalplaat	
2013	Turkish Berlina	Staalplaat	
2014	Un-used Re-mix's 1994–1995	Staalplaat	
2014	Trial Mixes 1997–1998	digitalDIZZY	
2015	Feel the Hiss	Staalplaat	
2015	Abyssinia Selasie	Staalplaat	
2016	Ali Zarin	Staalplaat	
2016	Mohammad Ali Jinnah	Staalplaat	
2019	Shekel of Israeli Occupation	Ultra-Mail Prod.	
2019	Babylon Is Iraq	Staalplaat	
2019	Amahar	Aquarellist	with The Rootsman
2019	Lalique Gadaffi Handgrenade	Staalplaat	
2020	Ryoji Ikeda Re-Mixs	Staalplaat	
2020	Demo	Staalplaat	
2020	Sadaam's Children	Staalplaat	
2020	Techno Arabaqua	Staalplaat	
2020	Arab American Radio	Staalplaat	
2021	Muslimgauze vs Celtarabia	Aquarellist	with Celtarabia
2022	Bedouin in Mercedes	Staaplaat	
2022	Turn On Arabic American Radio	Staaplaat	
2023	Home Demo Tracks	Staaplaat	
2023	The Remix	Staaplaat	
2025	Tape 13	Staaplaat	
2025	Muslimlahore	Staaplaat	
2026	Shia Psam Remix	Staaplaat	
2026	Outtakes	Prodam	with Sonar

=== Live albums ===
Year	Title	Label
2021	Live	Staalplaat

=== EPs and singles ===
Year	Title	Label	Note
1983	Hammer & Sickle	Hessian	
1988	Iran	Staaltape	
1990	"Death of Sant Jarnaii Singh Bindranwaie"	Minus Habens Records	split with F:A.R.
1992	Bhutto	Extreme	
1993	Red Crescent Part 3	The Way Out Sound	
1994	Infidel	Extreme	
1994	Nile Quartra	Jara Discs	
1994	Hebron Massacre	Soleilmoon	
1994	Drugsherpa	Staalplaat	
1995	Nadir of Purdah	Jara Discs	
1995	No Human Rights for Arabs in Israel	Staalplaat	
1996	Bandit Queen E.P.	Pi TB	
1996	Minaret-Speaker	Staalplaat	
1996	untitled	Syntactic	
1996	Zealot	Staalplaat	
1996	Azzazin	Staalplaat	
1997	Gulf Between Us	Soleilmoon	
1997	"Under the Burka (GIA mix)"	Anathor	split with Les Joyaux De La Princesse
1998	Uzi Mahmood	Soleilmoon	
1998	Melt	Staalplaat / Pretentious	
1999	Port Said	Audio.nl	
1999	Iranian Female Olympic Table Tennis Team Theme	Staalplaat	
1999	At the City of the Dead	BSI Records	with Systemwide
2000	Unfinished Mosque	Staalplaat	
2000	Ayatollah Dollar	Staalplaat	
2000	Nommos' Return	BSI Records	with Systemwide
2000	Bass Communion V Muslimgauze EP	Soleilmoon	with Bass Communion
2002	Al-Aqsa Intifada	Third Eye Music	with The Rootsman
2003	From the Edge	Chlorophyll Records	
2011	A.P Reworks Muslimgauze	Staalplaat	remixes by Anders Peterson
2011	untitled	The Muslimgauze Preservation Society	promo CDr, with The Rootsman
2011	Palestina Cache	The Muslimgauze Preservation Society	promo CDr
2012	Analog Zikr	The Muslimgauze Preservation Society	promo cassette
2016	"Untitled 1985"	Optimo Trax	split with Underspreche
2020	A.P Reworks Two	Staalplaat	remixes by Anders Peterson
2021	Kaliskinazure	Staalplaat	
2022	Zealot	Staalplaat	flexi postcard
2025	Single #One	Staalplaat	
2025	Twelve-Inch Single #One	Staalplaat	aka AR 71
2026	Luxor Brotherhood		with The Rootsman
2026	Single #Three	Staalplaat	
2026	Single #Four	Staalplaat	

=== Box sets ===
Year	Title	Label	Note
1998	Tandoori Dog	Staalplaat	
1999	Box of Silk and Dogs	Staalplaat	
2014	Chasing the Shadow of Bryn Jones 1983–1988	Vinyl On Demand	includes Chasing the Shadow of Bryn Jones book

=== Tributes ===
Year	Title	Artist	Label
2001	Muslimgauze – Listmembers Originals	various artists	Open Circuit
2002	El Tafkeera: Re-Mixs in Remembrance of Muslimgauze	various artists	sublevel9 studios
2007	Palestine	Pacific 231, Rapoon	Old Europa Cafe

=== Compilation albums ===
Year	Title	Label	Note
1988	untitled	Soleilmoon	
1989	Uzi	Parade Amoureuse	
1992	Coup d'Etat / Abu Nidal	Soleilmoon	
1997	Beyond the Blue Mosque	Staalplaat	
1998	Azure Deux	Staalplaat	
1999	Speaking with Hamas	Staalplaat	
2000	The Inspirational Sounds of Muslimgauze	Universal Egg	
2002	Chapter of Purity	Tantric Harmonies	
2003	Classics Selection	BSI Records	with Systemwide, Sound Secretion
2003	Re-Mixs 1 + 2	Soleilmoon	
2006	BCVSMGCD	Soleilmoon	with Bass Communion
2008	Nadir of Purdah	Tantric Harmonies / Aquarellist	
2008	Armsbazzar	Essence	
2011	From the Edge (Deluxe Edition)	The Muslimgauze Preservation Society	
2012	Martyr Shrapnel	The Muslimgauze Preservation Society	
2014	A Putrid Oasis	Vinyl On Demand / Soleilmoon	included with Chasing the Shadow of Bryn Jones book
2020	Khan Younis	Other Voices	
2021	Jackal the Invizible	Staalplaat	
2022	The Extreme Years	Staalplaat	

=== Expanded reissues ===
Year	Title	Label	Note
2000	Untitled	Klanggalerie	originally released as a 7″ on Syntactic
2004	No Human Rights for Arabs in Israel	Vivo / The Label	originally released as a 10″ on Staalplaat
2004	Syrinjia	Soleilmoon	originally released as a 12″
2004	From the Edge	Azra / Chlorophyll Records	originally released as a 12″
2007	Suns of Arqa Re-mixs Muslimgauze	Soleilmoon	originally released as an edited version on Arka Sound
2007	Muslimgauze vs Species of Fishes	Tourette	originally released as an edited version on Species of Fishes
2008	Jaagheed Zarb	Staalplaat	originally part of Tandoori Dog
2009	Uzi Mahmood	Soleilmoon	originally released as a 12″
2013	Tandoor Dog	Staalplaat	originally part of Tandoori Dog
2013	Drugsherpa	Staalplaat	originally released as a 3″ CD
2014	Deceiver Vol. 3 & 4	Staalplaat	Vol. 3 originally part of Box of Silk and Dogs
2015	Minaret Speaker	Staalplaat	originally released as a 7″
2015	Libya Tour Guide	Staalplaat	originally part of Tandoori Dog
2016	Jerusalaam	Staalplaat	originally part of Tandoori Dog
2019	Azzazin	Staalplaat	originally released as separate CD and 10″

=== Remixes ===
Year	Track(s)	Title	Artist	Label
1996	"Chilled No.6"	Golden Star	Nonplace Urban Field	Incoming!
1996	"Babylon Iz Iraq"	Rewound + Rerubbed	Unitone HiFi	Incoming!
1997	"Punished for Being Born (Muslimgauze mix)"	Dry Cleaning Ray	No-Man	3rd Stone
1997	"Western Sahara (Revolutionary mix)"	Out of the Darkness: The Rootsman Remixed	The Rootsman	Third Eye Music
1997	"Luxor (Brotherhood mix)"	Out of the Darkness: The Rootsman Remixed	The Rootsman	Third Eye Music
1998	"Baraca (Muslimgauze – Izlamic Zpain mix)"	En-Co-D-Esplendor	Esplendor Geometrico	Gift
1998	"Muslim Profit (Muslim Gauze mix)"	Remixes Vol. 2 & 3	Suns of Arqa	Echo Beach
1998	"Gavati Version (Muslim/Zombie mix)"	Remixes Vol. 2 & 3	Suns of Arqa	Echo Beach
1998	"Muslim Dub (Muslim Gauze mix)"	Remixes Vol. 2 & 3	Suns of Arqa	Echo Beach
1998	"Cheb Ragga (Mutagenic mix)"	The Final Frontier: The Rootsman Remixed	The Rootsman	Third Eye Music
1998	"Bad Boy Business (Rough Neck mix)"	The Final Frontier: The Rootsman Remixed	The Rootsman	Third Eye Music
1998	"The Advantgardist (Muslimgauze remix)	Where's the Funk?	Doppler 20:20	D.O.R.
1999	"Infinite Luke Warm Vibe"	Mind the Gap 25	Luke Vibert	Gonzo Circus
1999	"Untitled (Muslimgauze Red Madrassa Rmx)"	Печки и Почень	DJ Compass-Vrubell	Citadel

=== Compilation tracks ===
Year	Track(s)	Title	Label
1984	"Execute the Monkey"	Not by Chance	Frux
1984	"The Asphalt Jungle"	Film Noir: American Style	Ding Dong Records and Tapes
1984	"Sakharov"	Born Out of Dreams	Frux
1984	"Metropolis"	The Last Supper	Adventures in Reality
1984	"Trans/Time"	The Last Supper	Adventures in Reality
1984	"Dissidents"	Life at the Top	Third Mind Records
1985	"Sudanese Amputate the Hands of Thieves"	Terra Incognita Vol. 1	Auxilio De Cientos
1985	"Unwelcome Visitors"	Hits $ Corruption	Hits $ Corruption
1986	"New Delhi Flogging"	Songs from the New International	Recloose Organisation
1987	"Green Is the Colour of the Prophet" [remix]	Nightlands: A Final Image Nocturnal Compilation	Final Image
1989	"Gulf War"	A Conclusion of Unrestrained Philosophy	Livevil Compact Discs
1989	"Gulf-War (remix)"	Provoke N° 3	IMC
1990	"Live Excerpt"	Arrythmia – A Collection of Percussion and Rhythm	Charnel Music
1990	"Hashishiya"	Sonic Exhibition 2	NOP International
1990	"Amputation"	Sonic Exhibition 2	NOP International
1990	"Hassan in Fez (extract)"	Notre Dame 5	EE Tapes
1991	"United States of Islam (Syria mix)"	A Persons Healthy Guide to Listening	Regelwidrig
1991	"Y.A."	Project 91	Concrete Productions
1991	"Shiva"	X-X Section	Extreme
1991	"Sounds Effect"	Cénotaphe	Les Nouvelles Propagandes
1992	"Iran"	Journey into Pain	Beast 666 Tapes
1992	"Zarm" (with Hesskhe Yadalanah)	Hare, Hunter, Field: The Secret Passion of Rudolph Peterson	Johnny Blue
1994	"Thief Severed Hand"	Impulse #4	Impulse Magazine
1994	"Iraqi Opal"	Ophir	Désaccord Majeur
1994	"Khan Younis" [version]	Le Sacre Du Printemps	Gonzo Circus
1995	"Sarin and Tabun" [version]	Bizarre 8	Bizarre
1996	"Kaliskinazure"	Sonderangebot	Staalplaat
1997	"Exit Afghanistan"	Untitled (Ten)	Extreme
1998	"Uzi Mahmood (Trick Start version)"	Wreck This Mess: Remission 1	Noise Museum
1998	"Viva Hamas"	Dub Zap Pro	Staalplaat
1999	"Trialmix"	Marconi Point	Iris Light Records
1999	"Because He Had a Moustache & Beard They Thought He Was an Arab"	They've Got the Whole World in Their Hands	Methods to Survive Network System
1999	"Abu Kaff, Your Guide Around the West Bank Bedouin Shack"	They've Got the Whole World in Their Hands	Methods to Survive Network System
2000	"Devour"	High Density.1	Law & Auder
2000	"Army of Females Wearing Latex Gadaffi Masks"	East Westercism Volume 3	Law & Auder
2000	"Untitled"	Docking Sequence: BSI Campaign Vol. 1	BSI Records
2000	"Zeila Djibout"	Antena Krzyku 5/2000	Antena Krzyku
2003	"Untitled 3" (with Ah Cama-Sotz)	Danza De La Muerte (R.I.P. Syntactic)	Klanggalerie / Syntactic
2004	"Gold Sutra"	Colors Music: Ottomanic	IRMA Records
2007	"Zeila Djibouti Remix"	Listen to Something Different	Ars Macabre
2007	"Zahal End"	Post-Asiatic: Lost War Dream Music	URCKarm Recordings
