= Janne Stark =

Swedish guitarist and author (born 1963)

- Born: 1963 (age 62–63)
- Origin: Sweden
- Genres: Hard rock, heavy metal
- Instrument: Guitar
- Years active: 1979–present

Janne Stark (born 1963 in Karlshamn) is a Swedish guitarist and author.

== Biography ==
Stark recorded his first 7" single with the band Paradize in 1979, then formed the band Overdrive in 1980. He released the 12" MLP Reflexions in 1981, after which the band was signed by Planet Records and released the albums Metal Attack (1983) and Swords And Axes (1984). The band split in 1985 and Stark formed Overheat together with former Overdrive-singer Pelle Thuresson on bass. The band only lasted a few years and made no official recording.

In 1991 Stark participated in the national guitar competition Guitar Battle, where he went to the finals two years in a row, earning him tracks on the CD compilation Guitar Heroes Of Sweden.

In 1995 Stark formed the band Locomotive Breath. The band released its debut album Train Of Events in 1997 and 1998. The follow-up Heavy Machinery was released in 2002 and the band's third album Change Of Track was released in October 2005. This album featured Marcel Jacob (Talisman, Yngwie Malmsteen) on bass. After this the band took a long (and still lasting) break, with only a brief break to record the track "Fill Your Head With Rock" for the 2008 Sweden Rock Festival CD sampler.

In 1996 Stark released his first book, The Encyclopedia Of Swedish Hard Rock And Heavy Metal 1970–1996, a 400-page encyclopedia featuring more than one thousand Swedish recording bands. In 2002 his second effort Volume 2 was released. Both books released by Premium Publishing.

Besides playing guitar in his ordinary bands, Stark has also made guest appearances on recordings by many bands, including Narnia, Blinded Colony, Faith, VII Gates, Chris Catena, Rod Chappell Band, Audiovision, From Behind (featuring former Samson-singer Nicky Moore), Zello etc.

He is also responsible for layout and/or artwork for albums by his own bands, as well as Zello, Neon Rose, Zeelion, Axia, RAW, Have Mercy and others.

In December 2006 Janne was part of the one-off Sweden Rock All Star Band which also featured Udo Dirkschneider, Ian Haugland, Ryan Roxie, Oscar Dronjak etc.

In 2007 Stark released the debut by his new solo project Mountain Of Power on Grooveyard Records, dedicated to his influences from the seventies, such as Derringer, Moxy, Stray Dog, Captain Beyond and Budgie, featuring guests like Dan Swanö, Björn Lodin, Thomas Larsson, Anders Johansson, Chris Catena, Jonas Hansson, David Fremberg, Mikael "Nord" Andersson and Mike Andersson.

Further more an album with his collaboration with singer Chris Catena, christened Teenage Rampage, will release their debut in 2008. Also the resurrected Overdrive released the new album Let The Metal Do The Talking on Lion Music in January 2008.

In 2007 Stark joined forces with Björn Lodin and Mikael "Nord" Andersson in a completely new band called incarnation called BALLS. The band's debut album Chameleon was released on 10 October 2008, but the band folded shortly after its release. Janne and Mikael are still composing songs together for a forthcoming solo album by Mikael. Janne also contributed with guest guitars on releases by Thalamus, M.O.B, Alyson Avenue and Tower Of Stone.

In August 2008 The Encyclopedia of Swedish Punk was published by Premium Publishing, written by Peter Jandreus, but where Stark is credited for layout, additional text and research. In mid-2008 Janne started working on his own third encyclopedia of Swedish hard rock, which was planned to be released 2010 (Premium Publishing), but finally hit the streets in November 2013

In 2007 Stark started collaborating with Token/Scudiero keyboardist Mikael Rosengren in what was to become the band Constancia. The band's debut Lost And Gone was released on Frontiers Records in July 2009 and it was also released in Japan on King Records (with bonus track Wasted). In 2013 the band started working on the second album, which was released in 2015.

In 2010 Overdrive started working on their seventh release, entitled Angelmaker. It was released in January 2011. In March 2011 Overdrive released the vinyl LP The Angelmaker's Daughter which featured six non-CD tracks plus three tracks from Angelmaker.

Late 2011 Janne joined melodic rockers Grand Design, who release the single and video of "Baby It's You" on 17 May 2013, a cover of Canadian band Promises.

In November 2013 Janne's third encyclopedia, "The Heaviest Encyclopedia of Swedish Hard Rock and Heavy Metal Ever!" was published. It features information about 3600 Swedish hard rock/metal bands on 912 pages.

2014 marked the 30 year anniversary of Overdrive's second album "Swords And Axes" and the band also made their first tour in Japan, playing Club Zeela in Osaka, Birth Club Shunjuku and an in-door show at the HMV Store in Shibuya. Grand Design released the album "Thrill Of The Night" (AOR Heaven Europe/Rubicon Music Japan) and the band played the Melodicrock Fest in Chicago on 3 October.

In 2015 Janne released the second album with Constancia, a re-issue of the first album by Grand Design and the third release by Mountain of Power. The latter featured guest spots from Carl Dixon (Coney Hatch), Kee Marcello (Europe), Mikael Nord Andersson (Roxette, Scorpions), David Angstrom (Hermano, Luna Sol), Hank Shermann (Mercyful Fate), Michael Denner (Mercyful Fate) etc.

In 2016 Janne recorded a guest solo for Italian prog band Il Rovescio Della Medaglia on the album Tribal Domestic. He also recorded most of the guitar solos for Swedish/Canadian metal band Assassin's Blade's debut album Agents Of Mystification. Later the same year Janne started working on an album together with singer/bass player Neil Merryweather, under the name Merryweather Stark. The band was signed by GMR Records in 2017 for a release of the debut album in January 2018. The album, entitled Carved In Rock, was released on GMR Music in 2018 on CD and double-LP (with one bonus track). GMR Music also signed Grand Design and released the band's album Viva La Paradise, later in the year re-issued as Viva La Paradise – Special Mission, featuring four bonus tracks. In 2017, Janne joined Danish Thin Lizzy tribute band Falling Hazard, who released their first vinyl single I Lie Not (a tribute to Phil Lynott) and Old Town (a cover of Phil Lynott) in 250 copies.

In August 2019 Janne left Grand Design. In November the same year, Janne recorded a tribute to Welsh hard rock band Budgie under the project name Bandolier Kings. The album also features singer/guitarist Tony Spinner and guest spots from former Budgie members Tony Bourge and Steve Williams. Other guests includes for example Kyoji Yamamoto of Bow Wow, Ian Haugland of Europe, John Gallagher of Raven and Bill Steer of Firebird. 27 November 2020 saw two releases emerge from Janne, first off was of the second album by Merryweather Stark, entitled Rock Solid (CD/LP on GMR Music) and secondly the fourth album by Mountain of Power, entitled "Volume Four". This album featured guest spots from musicians such as Rob Lamothe of Riverdogs, Carl Dixon of Coney Hatch, Neil Merryweather and more.

On 18 June 2021 German label Pride & Joy released the third album by Constancia, entitled Brave New World. and in 2024 the follow-up IV Evermore saw the light of day on the same label, now seeing Janne handling both guitars and bass, plus mixing and mastering the album.

In 2022 Overdrive played their 42nd anniversary shows (which were supposed to be in 2020 as the 40th anniversary, but were postponed due to Covid), for example at the Sweden Rock Festival, a show which was also filmed for a future DVD. The same year Regain Records also re-issued "Reflexions", "Metal Attack" and "Swords and Axes" with lots of bonus tracks. On November 11 Grooveyard Records released the second Bandolier Kings album "Time To Remember", featuring guest spots from Budgie members Tony Bourge as well a musicians such as Andy La Rocque, Rowan Robertson, Doug Rappoport, John Gallagher etc. In the same month German label Metalville released the CD and LP Cosmic Affect by Merryweather Stark Wackerman, an album recorded already in 2019, but not finished until 2022. Besides Janne, the trio features Neil Merryweather and drummer John Wackerman. In 2025 Janne joined UK based heavy metal band Nerve Star whose debut single was released in November 2025.

== Equipment ==
Guitars
Mazzeguitar – Les Paul Junior Double Cutaway model – Janne#1
VGS Eruption Pro Signature model – with True Temperament, Evertune, Seymour Duncan pick-ups
VGS Eruption Pro Signature model – with True Temperament, Evertune, Dominger pick-ups
VGS Hammer Signature model
Gibson Les Paul Studio – with True Temperament neck
Gibson Les Paul Shred – Japan painted
Gibson Les Paul Custom (1972)
Gibson Les Paul Classic
Gibson Les Paul Traditional
Gibson Les Paul Junior DC
Gibson Flying V
Gibson Explorer 76 Reissue
Washburn Strat – with True Temperament neck
Eugen Strat B-tune – with True Temperament neck (custom built)
Fender Stratocaster HW1
Sonnemo Omni (signature model)
Peavey T40 bass
ESP B55 5-string bass

Amps
Marshall JVM410HJS + 4x12" cab
Marshall Super Lead (1978, pre-owned by Bernie Tormé)+ 4x12" cab
Marshall DSL 40 combo
Marshall Origin50 + Palmer 1x12 cab

== Releases featuring Stark ==
Paradise – "Caress of Steel" (7", 1980)
Overdrive – "Reflexions" (MLP, 1981)
Overdrive – "Rockslaget" (3LP comp, 1982)
Overdrive – "Metal Attack" (LP, 1983)
Overdrive – "Swords And Axes" (LP, 1984)
Janne Stark – "Guitar Heroes Of Sweden Vol 1" (CD, 1991)
Janne Stark – "Guitar Heroes Of Sweden Vol 2" (CD, 1992)
Paradize – "Swedish Metal Explosion" (CD, bootleg, 199?)
Overdrive – "Swedish Hard Rock & Heavy Metal" (3CD, 1996)
Locomotive Breath – "Swedish Hard Rock & Heavy Metal" (CD comp, 1996)
Overdrive – "Swedish Hard Rock & Heavy Metal" (3CD comp, 1996)
Locomotive Breath- "Train Of Events" (CD, 1997 Eu, 1998 Jap)
Locomotive Breath – "Released By X-mas" (CD comp, 1998)
Locomotive Breath – "Thousand Days Of Yesterdays – Captain Beyond tribute" (CD comp, 1999)
Overdrive- "Metal Attack" (CD re-issue, 1996)
Overdrive- "Swords And Axes" (CD re-issue, 1996)
Narnia – "Awakening" (CD, 1997) – guest
Locomotive Breath – "Power From The North" (CD comp, 2000)
Overdrive – "Overdrive" (7" Pic disc, 2001)
Locomotive Breath – "The Spirit Of The Black Rose – Phil Lynott tribute" (2CD comp, 2001)
Overdrive – "Mission Of Destruction – Live" (CD, 2001)
Locomotive Breath – "Heavy Machinery" (CD, 2002)
Locomotive Breath – "Train Of New Events" (CD, 2003)
Spearfish – "Back For The Future" (CD, 2003) – guest
VII Gates – "Fire, Walk With Me" (CD, 2003) – guest
Locomotive Breath – "Raisin' Hell In Blekinge" (CD comp, 2003)
Faith – "Salvation Lies Within" (LP, 2003) – guest
Blinded Colony – "Divine" (CD, 2004) – guest
Locomotive Breath – "The Sweet According To Sweden" (CD comp, 2004)
Zello – "First Chapter, Second Verse" (CD, 2004)
Audiovisions – "The Calling" (CD 2005) – guest
Locomotive Breath – "Change Of Track" (CD, 2005)
Overdrive – "Resurrected" (MCD, 2006)
Planet Alliance – s/t (CD, 2006)
Mountain Of Power – s/t (CD, 2006)
Tower Of Stone – "Painting Tomorrow" (CD demo, 2007) – guest
Teenage Rampage – "Too fast for love – A millennium tribute to Mötley Crüe" (CD comp, 2007)
The Kaars – "Göra Maul Kaaa" (CDS, 2007)
John Garner's Sir Lord Baltimore – "Sweden Rock Festival 2007" (CD comp, 2007)
Overdrive – "Sweden Rock Festival 2007" (CD comp, 2007)
Chris Catena – "Booze, Brawds and rockin' hard" (CD, 2007) – guest
Mörrum's Own – "Mörrum Ka" (MCD, 2007)
Chris Catena – "Discovery" (CD, 2008) – guest, composer
Overdrive – "Let The Metal Do The Talking" (CD, 2008)
Teenage Rampage – "Lick It Up: A Millennium Tribute to Kiss" (comp 2008)
Thalamus – "Beneath A Dying Sun" (CD, 2007) – guest
M.O.B – "The Greatest Enemy" (CD, 2008) – guest
Pavic – "Unconditioned" (CD, 2008) – lyrics
BALLS – "Chameleon" (CD, 2008)
Locomotive Breath – "Sweden Rock Festival 2008" (CD comp, 2008)
Constancia – "Sweden Rock Festival 2009" (CD comp, 2009)
Alyson Avenue – "Omega" (CD, 2009) – guest guitars
Constancia – "Lost And Gone" (CD, 2009)
Mountain Of Power – "Volume Two" (CD, 2010)
Audiovision – "Focus" (CD, 2010) – guest guitars
Ruined Soul – "My Dying Day" (CD, 2010) – guest guitars
Overdrive – "Angelmaker" (CD, 2011)
Overdrive – "The Angelmaker's Daughter" (LP, 2011)
Grand Design – "Rock For Japan" (comp CD, 2011) – guest
BALLS – "Rock & Roll Train" (comp CD, 2011)
Overdrive – "Embrace The Sun" (comp CD, 2011)
Locomotive Breath – "Embrace The Sun" (comp CD 2011)
Grand Design – "Idolizer" (CD, 2011) – guest
Tomas Bergsten's Fantasy – "Caught In The Dark" (CD, 2013) – guest
Peter Hermansson – "Black Cloud" (digital EP, 2013) – guest
Grand Design – "Baby It's You" (Promises cover) (digital single, 2013)
Overdrive – "Let The Metal Do The Talking" (LP, 2013)
Rocka Rollas – "The Road To Destruction" (CD, 2014) – guest
Grand Design – "Thrill Of The Night" (CD, 2014)
Osukaru – "Transition" (CD, 2015) – guest
Mike Onesko's Guitar Army – "In The Name Of Rock 'N Roll" (CD, 2015) – guest
Mountain Of Power – "From The Vault 3" (comp CD, 2015)
Constancia – "Final Curtain" (CD, 2015)
Constancia – "Final Curtain – Special Edition" (CD, 2015)
Grand Design – "Time Elevation (Re-elevated)" (CD, 2015) – guest, artwork
Mountain Of Power – "Volume Three" (CD, 2015)
Assassins Blade – "Angents Of Mystification" (CD, 2015) – guest
Mountain Of Power – "Volume Three" (2LP, 2016)
Magnolia – "På djupt vatten" (CD/LP, 2016) – mastering
Mother Misery – "Dedication" (MLP, 2016) – mastering
The Re-Stoned – "Reptiles Return" (LP, 2016) – mastering
Pretty Maids – "Kingmaker" (CD/LP, 2016) – recording engineer
Il Rovescio Della Medaglia – "Tribal Domestic" (CD/LP, 2016) – guest
Thalamus – "Hiding From Daylight" (LP/CD, 2017) - + guest
Merryweather Stark – "Carved In Rock" (2LP/CD, 2018)
Overheat – "Fight To The Finish" (CD, 2018)
Overdrive – "Reflexions" (LP, 2018)
Overdrive – "The Battle Of Rock" (CD, 2018)
Grand Design – "Idolizer" (CD/LP, 2018)
Grand Design – "Viva La Paradise" (CD/LP, 2018)
Grand Design – "Viva La Paradise – Special Mission" (CD, 2018)
Interaction – "Warriors" (CD, 2019) – artwork, pre-mastering
Falling Hazard – "I Lie Not/Old Town" (7", 2019)
Grand Design – "V" (CD/LP, 2020) – artwork layout, vinyl mastering
Tragik – "Faith Healer" (CD, 2020) – Guest solo
Shaggy – "Lessons For Beginners" (CD/LP, 2020) – artwork layout
Bandolier Kings – "Welcome To The Zoom Club (A Tribute To Budgie)" (CD/2LP, 2019/2020)
Tony Bourge – "Rocking Men" (CD, 2020) – Guest guitars
Chris Catena's Rock City Tribe – "Truth In Unity" (CD, 2020)
Merryweather Stark – "Rock Solid" (LP/CD, 2020)
Mountain Of Power – "Volume Four" (2LP/CD, 2020)
Overdrive – "Heavy Metal Night – Live In The Raw 1981" (LP, 2021)
Vanguard – "Vanguard" (LP/CD, 2020) – artwork
Peter Hermansson – "Second Glance" (CD, 2021) – artwork, guitar
Neil Merryweather – "Space Rangers" (LP/CD/cassette, 2021) – Re-issue artwork layout, mastering
Neil Merryweather – "Kryptonite" (LP/CD/cassette, 2021) – Re-issue artwork layout, mastering
Michael Riesenbeck & Friends – "Fanfields 3" (CD, 2021) – Guitars, mixing two songs
Overdrive – "High Roller" (7", 2021)
Overdrive – "Angelmaker" (LP, 2021)
Constancia – "Brave New World" (LP/CD, 2021)
Phil Vincent – "Stigmata" (CD, 2021) – Guest solo
Pat Jörliden – "Ser älvor dansa" (CDS, 2022) – Mastering, Artwork
Overdrive – "The Early Works 1980-81" (Cassette, 2022)
Overdrive – "Reflexions" (2CD, 2022)
Smed – "Smed" (LP/CD, 2022) – Guest solos
Bandolier Kings – "Time To Remember" (LP/CD, 2022)
Merryweather Stark Wackerman – "Cosmic Affect" (LP/CD, 2022)
Mountain of Power - "Volume Five" (LP/CD, 2023)
Paradize - "Caress Of Steel" (12", 2023)
Falling Hazard - "I Lie Not" (CD, 2023)
LEGEND Revisited – "From The Lord" (LP/CD, 2024)
Constancia - "IV Evermore" (LP/CD, 2024)
