= Jayce Landberg =

- Also known as: Erik J. Landberg, Erik Jayce Landberg
- Origin: Stockholm, Sweden
- Genres: Heavy metal, neoclassical metal, power metal, glam metal, hard rock, viking rock, punk rock, psychedelic rock, gothic rock
- Occupations: Musician, songwriter, producer, novelist, businessman, photographer, novelist, film director
- Instruments: Guitar, bass, keyboards, vocals, Drums
- Years active: 2007–present
- Labels: Marquee Avalon Japan, Escape Music, GMR Music Group, Victoria Records
- Website: jaycelandberg.com

Erik Jayce Landberg or Jayce Landberg, is a Swedish guitar virtuoso, composer, record producer, multi-instrumentalist, lyricist, poet, novelist, photographer, actor and film director.

== Early life ==
Landberg was born in Switzerland and grew up between Stockholm, Sweden, the Swedish countryside as well as Switzerland. At a very early stage he discovered art and poetry until finally picking up the guitar at his parents' request. At age 18, Landberg left his current household to move back to Stockholm where he started playing guitar in several band constellations. He attended Uppsala University as well as Stockholm University and graduated with a Master of Arts degree as well as a Bachelor of Law.

== Solo deal / recording career ==
In 2006, Jayce Landberg met rock vocalist Göran Edman, famous for his previous work with acts such as Yngwie Malmsteen & John Norum. The two of them recorded two songs which were released as a demo EP entitled Lost Without You.

=== 2005–2006 record deal ===
In the winter of 2005, Landberg decided to form his own band (which he would call Jayce Landberg) with former bandmates whom he had met while playing in previous bands, yet still looking for a vocalist. Prior to meeting Göran Edman, Landberg had written music for two songs: Lost Without You and the epic ballad Marilyn which Jayce originally wrote as a classical music piece. The lyrics to the song Lost Without You were later co-written with Edman and the recording resulted in the demo EP of the same name. It was released as a single in Japan & Europe, soon attracting the attention of record companies abroad. As a result, Landberg landed a solo record deal with Japanese label Marquee Avalon Records followed by the English label Escape Music Records to record his debut album Break The Spell also featuring Göran Edman on vocals.

=== 2007–2008 California ===
After signing his first Japanese record deal, Landberg moved briefly to San Francisco where he started writing material for his upcoming album. Recording sessions took place in Sacramento and later on in Stockholm.

The release of his debut effort Break The Spell in 2008 was launched and covered by several rock magazines such as Japanese Burrn! magazine. and received very good reviews in the European & American press. Although only released as an import in the USA, prior to the international release of Break The Spell Landberg was interviewed on Alice Morning Show in California. The same year, Jayce also recorded two radio jingles for CBS in California.

=== 2009–2010 second album "Good Sleepless Night" ===
In 2009 Landberg hooked up with the Swedish band Europe's bassist John Levén and American vocalist Mark Boals (ex-Malmsteen, Ring Of Fire) to produce and record several new songs that were to be included on his second effort "Good Sleepless Night". The album was released in February 2010 on Escape Records featuring both musicians as guest artists.

2010 also saw Landberg collaborating with the "Norwegian Grammy"-winning video director Patric Ullaeus to shoot and direct a music video for his brand-new ballad "The Thorns".

Ullaeus has previously shot and continues to direct videos for bands such as Ace of Base, Europe, Rednex, Lutricia Mc Neal, In Flames etc.

=== 2011–2014 experimenting era and "Boléro" ===
After the release of his second album Good Sleepless Night, Landberg wasted no time, this time turning himself to the piano, on which he started writing material for his third effort which would eventually become The Forbidden World. The album was recorded quite quickly but took several years for Landberg to be satisfied with the final master, working with several mastering studios until finally settling down for the renowned Abbey Road Studios in London.

In 2013, prior, to the final release of the album, Landberg released a few outtakes taken from the album's recording sessions on a promotional limited edition E.P. entitled Promise of Asgaard which offered an alternative master.

A year earlier, in 2012, Landberg who had set out to record an accurate symphony rendition of French composer Maurice Ravel's Boléro using only modern instruments, released for the first time in musical history, an entire electric guitar orchestration of Ravel's famous classical piece, composed of over 100 electric guitars, basses and drums, with each electric guitar replacing a violin, cello as well as any other classical instrument present in Ravel's original work, and in which Landberg performed each instrument.

This period also saw Landberg experimenting simultaneously with different styles and recording a psychedelic rock E.P. entitled Masquerade and released digitally under the band name Inside Monroe in 2014, on which he handled all instruments and vocals except for the drums.

=== 2015–2020 Bleckhorn / third album "The Forbidden World" ===
As work on The Forbidden World progressed, Landberg was approached by ex-Hammerfall bassist Magnus Rosén in 2015. Rosén had heard one of Landberg's tracks and was struck by one his compositions. Soon, the two of them developed an artistic bond and decided to team up with ex-Hammerfall drummer Anders Johansson who had shown interest in joining the new band. However, this original line-up did not materialize and Andersson's drum vacancy was replaced by ex-John Norum & 220 Volt drummer Peter Hermansson who ended up recording drums on all songs.

The result became the supergroup Bleckhorn, a modern-sounding Scandinavian metal band lyrically influenced by Old Norse mythology on which Landberg played guitar and wrote all the songs. The Viking theme was proposed by Rosén while Landberg came up with the name Bleckhorn, stating that it was his family's and ancestors' old Viking name. Their first E.P. Dragonfire was released digitally under license of GMR Music Group in 2018.

By 2019, Landberg had completed almost all work on his third solo effort and signed a Master deal with GMR Music Group to finally release The Forbidden World, both physically and digitally on 13 November 2020.

=== 2020–2023 Filmmaking ===
God is Dead

By the time The Forbidden World album was completed, Landberg started increasingly gaining more control over the production of his music videos by directing the upcoming promotional video for the song God is Dead for which he also wrote the concept and storyline. His involvement up until then had been merely as an executive producer as well as screenwriter and screenplay. God is Dead was released in December 2020 and became an instant hit on Youtube reaching 1.900.000 views.

Truth or Dare Trilogy

After the success of God is Dead, Landberg stated that he realised he had come up with a whole story with characters which could be turned into a series, which sparked the idea for the following Truth or Dare trilogy consisting of three consecutive films based on songs from Landberg’s “The Forbidden World” album. The two first parts of the film trilogy, Never Love Again and “Jealousy” were released on Prime Video as well other streaming platforms in 2021 and won several awards in film festival all over the world. The third and final part of the trilogy is under postproduction as of 2023.

Subsequent work

During the production of the trilogy, Landberg filmed and directed two subsequent works entitled Promise of Asgaard released in April 2022 as well as the mini-documentary/rock opera “The Story of Tituba – Happy 4 U” which got over 6 nominations and selected as best film by several film festivals.

== Influences and style ==
As a guitar player in the press, Landberg is often compared to guitarist Yngwie Malmsteen both style wise and technique wise. Although Landberg acknowledges the fact that he had been listening to Malmsteen in his early teens, he rejects the fact that he has a similar style, pointing out music and composition as a far greater emphasis in his music than just guitar technique. Among strong influences, Landberg has cited Edward van halen in several radio interviews such as in The Heavy Metal Mayhem Radio interview in New York.

== Personal life ==
Landberg has dedicated the song Left on a Dream to one of his ex-longtime girlfriends. Landberg is known to be a bit of a recluse and speaks rarely of his private life. He is not very active on social media.

== Musical equipment ==
Landberg uses mostly modified Stratocaster guitars, Les Pauls and old Marshall Plexi amplifiers. He dislikes the use of plug-ins and similar recording techniques according to a show aired on 22 September 2020 on London based ARfm Radio.

== Band members ==
Current members (Jayce Landberg band)

- Erik Jayce Landberg—All electric & acoustic guitars, bass, piano, vocals, songwriting (2006–present)
- Göran Edman—vocals (2006–present)
- James Humphrey—drums, percussion (2007–2010, 2018–present)

Current members (Bleckhorn)

- Erik Jayce Landberg—All electric & acoustic guitars, keyboards and songwriting (2015–present)
- Göran Edman—vocals (2015–present)
- Micke Rosengren—drums, percussion (2026–present)
- Magnus Rosén—bass (2015–present)

Current & past Members (Inside Monroe)

- Erik Jayce Landberg—All electric & acoustic guitars, bass, organ, vocals, songwriting (2012–present)
- Sofia Ullman—Organ (2014)
- Jens Bock —drums, percussion (2012–2014)

== Guest artists ==
Band members appearing as guest artists (Jayce Landberg band)

- John Levén—bass ("Good Sleepless Night", 2010)
- Mark Boals—vocals ("Good Sleepless Night", 2010)
- Erika Norberg—vocals ("The Forbidden World", 2020)

== Past members ==
Former band members (Jayce Landberg band)

- Charlie Arvstrand—keyboards (2006–2008)
- Mio Jäger—Vocals (2006–2008)
- Michael Storm—drums, percussion (2006–2007)
- James Humphrey—drums, percussion (2007–2008)
- Jens Bock—drums, percussion (2009–2014)
- Chris Pettersson—bass (2008–2011)

Former band members (Bleckhorn)

- Peter Hermansson—drums, percussion (2016–2019)

== Discography ==
As JAYCE LANDBERG

- Break the Spell (2008)
- Good Sleepless Night (2010)
- The Forbidden World (2020)

Singles & EPS

- Lost Without You (Demo EP) (2007)
- Bolero (2012)
- Promise of Asgaard (2013)
- The Thorns (2014)
- Marilyn (Remastered EP) (2026)

With INSIDE MONROE

- Masquerade (2014)

With BLECKHORN

- Dragonfire (2019)
- Untitled album (Under recording)

MOVIE SOUNDTRACKS

- Truth or Dare - Motion Picture Soundtrack (LP) (expected in 2026)
