= The Yngwie Malmsteen Collection =

Compilation album by Yngwie J. Malmsteen
- Released: November 1991
- Recorded: 1984–1990
- Genre: Heavy metal, neoclassical metal
- Length: 73:17
- Label: PolyGram
- Producer: Yngwie J. Malmsteen and Jeff Glixman

Yngwie J. Malmsteen chronology
Eclipse (1990)	The Yngwie Malmsteen Collection (1991)	Fire & Ice (1992)

Professional ratings
Review scores
Source	Rating
Allmusic	4/5 stars

The Yngwie Malmsteen Collection is the first compilation album by Yngwie J. Malmsteen. It was released in November 1991.

== Track listing ==
No.	Title	Lyrics	Music	Original album	Length
1.	"Black Star"	(instrumental)	Yngwie J. Malmsteen	Rising Force	4:53
2.	"Far Beyond the Sun"	(instrumental)	Malmsteen	Rising Force	5:52
3.	"I'll See the Light Tonight"	Jeff Scott Soto, Malmsteen	Malmsteen	Marching Out	4:24
4.	"You Don't Remember, I'll Never Forget"	Malmsteen	Malmsteen	Trilogy	4:29
5.	"Liar"	Malmsteen	Malmsteen	Trilogy	4:07
6.	"Queen in Love"	Malmsteen	Malmsteen	Trilogy	4:02
7.	"Hold On"	Joe Lynn Turner, Malmsteen	Malmsteen	Odyssey	5:11
8.	"Heaven Tonight"	Turner, Malmsteen	Malmsteen	Odyssey	4:06
9.	"Déjà Vu"	Turner, Malmsteen	Malmsteen	Odyssey	4:17
10.	"Guitar Solo"	(instrumental)	Malmsteen	Trial by Fire	10:16
11.	"Spanish Castle Magic" (live)	Jimi Hendrix	Hendrix	Trial by Fire	6:44
12.	"Judas"	Göran Edman, Malmsteen	Malmsteen	Eclipse	4:25
13.	"Making Love" (extended guitar solo)	Edman, Malmsteen	Malmsteen	Eclipse	6:22
14.	"Eclipse"	(instrumental)	Malmsteen	Eclipse	3:45
