= Crossfade =

Crossfade may refer to:

- Crossfade (audio engineering), an audio mixing technique
- Crossfade (American band), an American rock band from South Carolina
  - Crossfade (album), their 2004 debut album
- Crossfade (Swedish band), a Swedish rock-pop band
- Crossfade (The Remix Album) a 2006 album by Arash

== See also ==
- Dissolve (filmmaking), a gradual transition from one image to another
