= Edman =

Edman is a surname and given name. Notable people with the name include:

Surname:

- Erik Edman (born 1978), Swedish footballer
- Ferdinand Kvan Edman (born 1993), Norwegian middle-distance runner
- Gökhan Edman (born 1964), Turkish volleyball coach
- Göran Edman (born 1956), Swedish vocalist
- Irwin Edman (1896–1954), American philosopher and professor of philosophy
- Jens Edman (born 1976), Swedish auto racing driver
- Johan Edman (1875–1927), Swedish tug of war competitor who competed in the 1912 Summer Olympics
- Jonas Edman (born 1967), Swedish rifle shooter, specializing in the Prone position
- Niclas Edman (born 1991), Swedish ice hockey player
- Pehr Victor Edman (1916–1977), Swedish biochemist
- Phil Edman (born 1970), Australian politician
- Tommy Edman (born 1995), American baseball player
- Tore Edman (1904–1995), Swedish ski jumper who competed in the 1920s
- V. Raymond Edman (1900–1967), American minister and author

Given name:

- Edman Ayvazyan (1932–2020), Iranian-Armenian painter
- Edman Lara (born 1985), Bolivian politician and former police officer
- William Edman Leonard (1836–1891), Private in the Union Army in the American Civil War

== See also ==
- Edman degradation, developed by Pehr Edman, is a method of sequencing amino acids in a peptide
- Edman Island, island near the center of O'Brien Bay, Budd Coast
