= Hussein Mahmood Jeeb Tehar Gass =

Studio album by Muslimgauze
- Released: 15 January 1999
- Label: Soleilmoon Recordings SOL 73 CD

Muslimgauze chronology
Remixs Vol 3 (1999)	Hussein Mahmood; Jeeb Tehar Gass (1999)	Port Said (1999)

Professional ratings
Review scores
Source	Rating
AllMusic	link

Hussein Mahmood Jeeb Tehar Gass is an album by Muslimgauze. The CD booklet is a multi fold out poster with photographs by Shirin Neshat, including her "Offered Eyes" (1993) on the front cover and "Grace Under Duty" (1994) and "Rebellious Silence" (1994) inside. It was released one day after Bryn Jones's death.

== Track listing ==
1. "Bilechik Mule" – 5:37
2. "Hussein Mahmood Jeeb Tehar Gass" – 6:55
3. "Nazareth Arab" – 6:34
4. "Sarin Odour" – 6:46
5. "Turkish Purdah" – 7:54
6. "Minarets of America" – 0:56
7. "Istanbul" – 9:27
8. "Uzi Mahmood 7" – 4:23
9. "Uzi Mahmood 12" – 9:36
