= List of untitled musical works =

Many musical works have been created or released without a title.

== Albums ==
- The untitled fifth album by Blink-182, later known as Blink-182, 2003
- _, the untitled tenth album by BT, 2016
- 3 Foot Clearance, the untitled thirtieth album by Buckethead, 2010
- Untitled Coma album, 2011
- The debut album of Justice, usually known as Cross, 2007
- Untitled Korn album, 2007
- Led Zeppelin IV, the untitled fourth album by Led Zeppelin, 1971
- LP5, the untitled fifth album by Autechre, 1998
- Untitled Muslimgauze compilation
- Untitled Nas album, 2008
- Untitled Prince albums Love Symbol and The Black Album
- Untitled Royal Trux album
- Untitled Throbbing Gristle album
- Untitled Trooper album, 1980
- Untitled album by Zoviet France, 1982
- Untitled Rammstein album, 2019

== EPs ==
- Untitled Deafheaven demo EP, 2010
- Untitled Deerhoof EP, 2006
- Untitled EP by Chris Staples (recording as Discover America)
- Unnamed EP by Fuck the Facts
- Untitled Hodgy Beats EP
- Untitled Muslimgauze EP
- Untitled Slint EP
- Untitled Soap&Skin EP
- Untitled Sonny Condell EP
- Untitled Willy Mason EP

== Songs and singles ==
- Track 3 by Animal Collective from Spirit They're Gone, Spirit They've Vanished
- All tracks by Aphex Twin from Selected Ambient Works Volume II, except for "Blue Calx"
- Tracks 2 and 3 by Kelsea Ballerini from "Love Me Like You Mean It"
- Track 8 by Better Than Ezra from Deluxe
- "Song 2" by Blur from Blur
- Track 13 by Garth Brooks from Double Live
- All songs by Buckethead from In Search of The
- Tracks 3, 5, 8 and 10 by Christie Front Drive from Christie Front Drive
- Track 3 by Echosmith from Lonely Generation, later retitled "Cracked"
- All tracks by John Frusciante from disc 2 of Niandra Lades and Usually Just a T-Shirt
- Track 10 by Great White from the Japan and the UK versions of ...Twice Shy
- Track 7 by King Crimson from Islands
- Track 6 by Magic Dirt from Signs of Satanic Youth
- Track 10 by Neutral Milk Hotel from In the Aeroplane Over the Sea
- Tracks 6 and 11 by Oasis from (What's the Story) Morning Glory?
- A hidden track at the end of Frequencies from Planet Ten by Orange Goblin
- Tracks 12 (unofficially titled "Yeah") and 13 by Queen from Made in Heaven
- A hidden track at the end of Kid A by Radiohead
- Track 11 by R.E.M. from Green
- All tracks from Sigur Rós' album ( )
- Several tracks by Squarepusher from Burningn'n Tree
- Untitled track from the album Thawing Dawn by A.Savage.
- All tracks released by The Body Lovers / The Body Haters
- Track 1 from Merzbow and John Watermann's collaboration Brisbane-Tokyo Interlace
- Track 10 by Brand New from The Devil and God Are Raging Inside Me
- Track 1 on wetdream by Willy Rodriguez

== Classical works ==
- Untitled piece for flute, bass clarinet, bassoon, horn, trumpet, piano and cello (1954) by Morton Feldman
- Untitled piece for tape (1972) by Claude Vivier
