= Hard (band) =

Hungarian rock band

- Origin: Budapest, Hungary
- Genres: Hard rock
- Years active: 2004 – present
- Labels: Hammer Records
- Members: Björn Lodin; Balázs Hornyák; Gábor "Zserbó" Mirkovics; Zsolt Csillik; Zsolt Vámos
- Past members: Dénes Makovics; Zoltán Váry
- Website: www.hardhungary.com

Hard is a Hungarian hard rock supergroup formed in late 2004 in Budapest, Hungary by József Kalapács (ex-vocalist of Pokolgép and Omen, currently also singing in Kalapács) and Gábor Mirkovics (ex-bass guitarist of Edda Művek). The rest of the band consisted of guitarist Zsolt Csillik (ex-Dance, Jack Daniels and Fix), keyboardist Dénes Makovics (also known for playing saxophone in Bikini) and drummer Zoltán Váry (ex-Sing Sing, ex-Zero-G, guitars–vocals for the Hungarian Kiss tribute band KISS Forever Band).

In 2005, Ferenc Béres arrived to fill in the position of Dénes Makovics, who was a session member for the studio recording of the first release, “Égni kell”. He played in EDDA Művek and Fix beforehand. In 2007, Váry left because of the German success of Kiss Forever Band (he couldn't concentrate on Hard enough), so Donászy arrived, who also played in e.g. Beatrice.

In 2007 Hard reformed for an international introduction with singer Zoltan Batky (BZ). The album Traveler was released in 2008. The material has since been remixed by the producer Beau Hill in 2008.

In 2009, Swedish vocalist and guitarist Björn Lodin was confirmed as the new singer for Hard. Björn is known for his work with Swedish rockers Baltimoore. Platinum-selling Hungarian guitar virtuoso Endre Csillag has also joined the ranks along with drummer Balázs Hornyák. The band start recording their new CD together in the Autumn with Björn Lodin also handling the production duties. The new, as yet untitled album, is scheduled for release on BLP Music, March 2010.

"Love Goes With Anything" is the debut single from the new line-up and was released in November 2009.

== Members ==
- Björn Lodin (vocals, guitar)
- Balázs Hornyák (drums)
- Gábor "Zserbó" Mirkovics (bass)
- Zsolt Csillik (guitar)
- Zsolt Vámos (guitar)

=== Former members ===
- Dénes Makovics (keyboards, 2004–05)
- Zoltán Váry (drums, 2004–07)
- Tibor Donászy (drums)
- Ferenc Béres (keyboards)

== Discography ==
- 2005: Égni kell (EP)
- 2005: Égi jel
- 2007: 100% Hard
- 2008: Traveler
- 2010: Time is Waiting for No One
- 2011: Even Keel
