= Eatman (surname) =

- Language: English

Origin
- Language: Middle English
- Derivation: Edman
- Meaning: Possibly derived from a given name meaning "prosperous person"

Other names
- Variant form: Eatmon

Eatman is a surname. The surnames Eatman and Eatmon probably originated as variants of the English surname Edman. The surname Edman was derived from a Middle English given name (also spelled Edeman, Adman, or Ademan), itself probably from an Old English given name consisting of ead "prosperity" and mann "person", though that Old English given name is unattested. Other variants of the surname Edman include Edmans and Edmands. The 2010 United States census found 1,183 people with the surname Eatman, making it the 21,940th-most-common name in the country. This represented an increase from 921 (25,242nd-most-common) in the 2000 Census. In the 2010 census, about 55% of the bearers of the surname identified as White, and 40% as Black.

Notable people with the surname include:

- Heather Eatman (born 1968), American singer-songwriter, graphic artist and portraitist
- Irv Eatman (born 1961), American football player
