= Baltimoore =

- Origin: Sweden
- Genres: Hard rock
- Years active: 1987–1995, 2000–present
- Labels: BLP

Baltimoore is a Swedish rock band, led by Swedish singer Björn Lodin. Lodin was originally approached by Elektra Records in 1987 to record a solo album, but Lodin opted to use the moniker Baltimoore rather than his own name. In 1992, Lodin relocated to Åland, Finland, where he met Bulgarian-born guitarist Nikolo Kotzev. They joined forces for two Baltimoore albums, Double Density and Thought for Food. Due to personal and musical differences, Kotzev left the band in 1994 to start his own project, Brazen Abbot.

Baltimoore was then on hiatus until 2000, when Lodin resurfaced with Original Sin. He would move back to Sweden the same year.

In 2006, the band ended its relationship with Finnish record label Lion Music to start up their own label, BLP Music, on which their two latest albums, Kaleidoscope and X (both 2006), are released. Lodin then contributes to an album "Chameleon" released by Balls before beginning work on a new Baltimoore album entitled Quick Fix in late 2008 set for release in the second quarter of 2009.

== Members ==
=== Current members ===
- Björn Lodin - vocals
- Mankan Sederberg - guitars (2004 - )
- Thomas Larsson - guitars (1989, 2000–2003, 2006 -)
- Weine Johansson - bass (1991 - )
- Hempo Hildén - drums (2004 - )

=== Former members ===
- Stefan Bergström - guitars (1989–1990, 2004 - )
- Nikolo Kotzev - guitars, keyboards (1992–1994)
- Mats Olausson - keyboards (1989–1990)
- Lars Pollack - keyboards (1992)
- Örjan Fernkvist - keyboards (2001, 2009)
- Ulf Widlund - bass (1989)
- Anders Åström - bass (1989)
- Jenny Wikström - bass (1990)
- Nikolay Kardzhilov (Koko) - bass (1992)
- Rolf Alex - drums (1989–1991)
- Jamie Borger - drums (1992)
- Ian Haugland - drums (1994, 2001–2003)

== Discography ==
- There's no Danger on the Roof (1989) #37 SE
- Freak (1990)
- Double Density (1992)
- Thought for Food (1994)
- Original Sin (2000)
- The Best of Baltimoore (2001)
- Ultimate Tribute (2003)
- Fanatical (2005)
- Kaleidoscope (2006)
- X (2006)
- Quick Fix (2009)
