= Nikolo Kotzev =

Nikolo Kotzev Николо Коцев
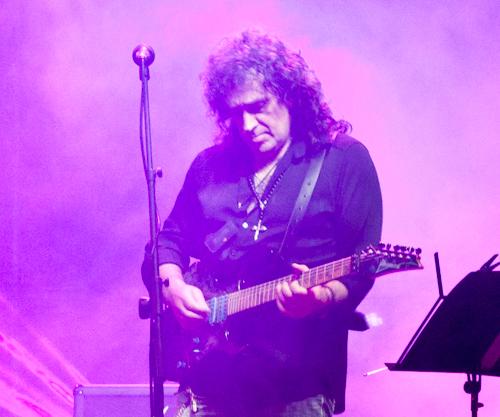
- Kotzev performing in 2016

Background information
- Born: 6 June 1961 (age 65); Pazardzhik, Bulgaria
- Genres: Hard rock, rock opera
- Occupation: Musician
- Instrument: Guitar
- Years active: 1982–present

Nikolo Kotzev (Bulgarian: Николо Коцев) (born 6 June 1961) is a Bulgarian guitarist, songwriter and producer. He composed the 2001 rock opera Nostradamus and founded the band Brazen Abbot.

== Biography ==
Kotzev was born in Pazardzhik and started taking violin lessons at the age of five. While in his teens he took an interest in rock music and started playing the guitar.

Nikolo worked as a session musician and played the guitar in the Bulgarian rock group Impulse. While touring in Europe in the late 1980s, he met Swedish singer Björn Lodin. After Kotzev relocated to Mariehamn, Åland, Finland in 1989, he joined Lodin's band Baltimoore, with whom he recorded two albums: Double Density (1992) and Thought for Food (1994).

Creative differences led to Kotzev's departure in 1994, at which point he started working on a solo project under the Brazen Abbot moniker. The result was Live and Learn (1995), which featured singers Göran Edman, Glenn Hughes and Thomas Vikström, keyboard player Mic Michaeli, bassist Svante Henryson and drummer Ian Haugland. Kotzev played guitar, produced, mixed and wrote all the songs for the album. The follow-up album, Eye of the Storm (1996), featured mostly the same line-up, with Joe Lynn Turner replacing Hughes and John Levén replacing Henryson. The same line-up also released Bad Religion (1997).

Brazen Abbot was put on hiatus when Kotzev started working on a rock opera about Nostradamus. Due to a string of setbacks, including scheduling conflicts and Kotzev's record company, USG Records, going bankrupt, the album was not completed until 2000 and was finally released as Nikolo Kotzev's Nostradamus in 2001 on SPV Records. The album featured most Brazen Abbot members, in addition to singers Jørn Lande (Masterplan), Alannah Myles and Sass Jordan.

The first staged production of Nikolo Kotzev's Nostradamus was presented at the State Opera Ruse on 18 and 19 November 2016, coinciding with the 450th anniversary of Nostradamus's death. The production was made in collaboration with State Opera Ruse and conductor Nayden Todorov. The cast included Aleksandar Atanasov as Nostradamus, Zvezdi Keremidchiev as the Inquisitor, Amalia Nenova as Anne Gemelle, Björn Lodin as the Storyteller, Thomas Vikström as the Soldier/Ghost, Mehmet Kaya as King Henry II and Nora Karaivanova as Catherine de' Medici, with actor Nencho Balabanov as narrator. The stage director was Orlin Dyakov, the conductor was Nayden Todorov, the scenographer was Ivan Ivanov-Yoani, and Kotzev served as musical director; the production also involved the band KIKIMORA and the orchestra, chorus and ballet of State Opera Ruse. The production was subsequently performed in other Bulgarian cities, including Plovdiv and Sofia.

Kotzev resumed work with Brazen Abbot in 2002, releasing Guilty as Sin in 2003. The line-up was mostly the same as for Bad Religion, with Lande replacing Vikström. Michaeli, Levén and Haugland departed Brazen Abbot to rejoin Europe. Temporary replacements filled in during a short tour in Bulgaria, recordings of which were released on the live album A Decade of Brazen Abbot (2004). My Resurrection followed in 2005, and featured four singers: Edman, Turner and new members Tony Harnell and Erik Mårtensson, together with a new backing band consisting of bassist Wayne Banks, organist Nelko Kolarov and drummer Mattias Knutas.

In 2015, Kotzev was criticized by his former colleague Joe Lynn Turner after the release of a twentieth-anniversary compilation CD/DVD of Live and Learn material, which Turner described as a homemade bootleg.

In 2011 Kotzev relocated back to his home country Bulgaria and founded a new band, called KIKIMORA. The band has released albums including Dirty Nails and For a Broken Dime.

Kotzev has also worked on a second rock opera, Draconia, conceived for singers, rock band, orchestra and choir.

== Discography ==
- Baltimoore - Double Density (1992)
- Baltimoore - Thought For Food (1994)
- Brazen Abbot - Live and Learn (1995)
- Brazen Abbot - Eye of the Storm (1996)
- Brazen Abbot - Bad Religion (1997)
- Nikolo Kotzev - Nostradamus (2001)
- Brazen Abbot - Guilty as Sin (2003)
- Brazen Abbot - A Decade of Brazen Abbot (2004)
- Brazen Abbot - My Resurrection (2005)
- Kikimora - Кикимора (2015)
- Kikimora - Dirty Nails (2021)
- Kikimora - For A Broken Dime (2023)
- Rated X - Rated X guest guitarist

Released by Sonoton music

- Orchestral Documentary
- Heavy Action
- Rock Meets Orchestra 3
- Action & Sports
- Garden Of Wonders
- Hybrid Action Rock
- Adventure Land 1
- Adventure Land 2
- Rock Action & Adventure
- Acoustic Feelgood
- Cinematica

DVDs

- A Decade Of Brazen Abbot
- Brazen Abbot Live At The Amphitheater
- 20 Years Of Brazen Abbot - compilation
- Joel - a classical opera
- The Making Of Nostradamus documentary
