= Deceiver (Muslimgauze album) =

Studio album by Muslimgauze
- Released: 30 September 1996
- Genre: Experimental, ethnic electronica, ambient
- Length: CD1 1:13:28; CD2 1:01:50
- Label: Staalplaat; MUSLIMLIM008

Muslimgauze chronology
Uzbekistani Bizzare and Souk (1996)	Deceiver (1996)	Arab Quarter (1996)

Professional ratings
Review scores
Source	Rating
Allmusic	link

Deceiver is an album by Muslimgauze released in a numbered limited edition of 800 copies as part of Staalplaat's subscription-only series of Muslimgauze releases.

== Track listing ==
All tracks by Bryn Jones

=== CD 1 ===
1. "Deceiver" - 24:40
2. "Palestine Is Our Islamic Land" - 6:05
3. "Azeri Jab" - 4:48
4. "A Parsee View" - 3:24
5. "Zenana Acidbox" - 4:03
6. "Herod-1" - 3:26
7. "Sanskrit" - 4:02
8. "Morsel Of Sand" - 3:16
9. "Yemani" - 1:41
10. "Khshatrapa" - 3:06
11. "Feztoun" - 1:44
12. "A Parsee View" - 2:22
13. "Deceiver" - 3:56
14. "Herod-2" - 2:41
15. "Palestine Is Our Islamic Land" - 4:14

=== CD 2 ===
1. "Zameenzad" - 5:19
2. "Balfour Blood" - 4:51
3. "Unorthodox Singh Babel" - 2:28
4. "Jagdish Masjid Of Light" - 3:21
5. "Naguib Amber Reptile" - 2:38
6. "Saudi" - 4:04
7. "Guru Of Falsehood" - 2:52
8. "Aquarabiq" - 2:01
9. "Chandraswami" - 3:00
10. "Sikandra An Fail" - 4:08
11. "Mahfouz Ala" - 3:08
12. "Rajputta" - 3:06
13. "Akbars Final Fax" - 2:38
14. "Jagdish Masjid Of Night" - 3:22
15. "Hinducash" - 1:03
16. "Aquarabik" - 2:04
17. "Free From A Veil" - 4:57
18. "Red Swami" - 0:38
19. "Red Swami (p12/p13)" - 6:12
