= Signum Regis =

Slovak power metal band

- Origin: Senec, Slovakia
- Genres: Power metal; Melodic metal; Heavy metal; Christian metal
- Years active: 2007–present
- Labels: Ulterium Records; Locomotive Music; Beyond The Storm Productions; Inner Wound Recordings
- Members: Ronnie König; Filip Koluš; João "Jota" Fortinho; Ján Tupý; Jaro Jančula
- Past members: Mayo Petranin; Ado Kaláber; Luděk Struhař; Adrian Ciel
- Website: www.signum-regis.com

Signum Regis is a Slovak power metal band founded in 2007 by bass player and songwriter Ronnie König. Despite often being labelled as a power metal band, their music can also be described as melodic metal with a focus on heavy, shredding guitars. Most of the Signum Regis band members were part of a metal band called Vindex.

== History ==
In 2007, Ronnie König founded the band Signum Regis and together with the vocalist Göran Edman they started working on a self-titled album, which was released the following year through Locomotive Records.

In 2015, the band participated in the Spark Fresh Blood contest organised by the rock magazine Spark, Budweiser Budvar and Bandzone.cz. After getting into the final 12, the band performed at the III.Finals Concert, which took place on November 14, 2015, in Liberec, Czech Republic. In January 2016, Signum Regis were announced the winners of the contest.

On September 11, 2018, the band informed on their official Facebook page that the lead singer Mayo Petranin was leaving the band. João "Jota" Fortinho became the new lead singer of Signum Regis in June 2019.

Their latest album "The Seal of a New World" was released on November 22, 2019, and it immediately received excellent reviews from all over the world.

== Band members ==
Current members

- Jota Fortinho - vocals
- Ronnie König - bass guitar
- Filip Koluš - guitar
- Ján Tupý - keyboards and backing vocals
- Jaro Jančula - drums

Past members

- Mayo Petranin - vocals
- Ado Kaláber - guitar
- Luděk Struhař - drums
- Adrian Ciel - drums

Guest Vocals

- Göran Edman
- Lance King
- Michael Vescera
- Matt Smith
- Daísa Munhoz
- Eli Prinsen
- Samuel Nyman
- Thomas Winkler
- David Åkesson

Other

- Libor Krivák - lead guitar (Symphonity)
- Ivo Hofmann - keyboards (Symphonity)
- Magnus Karlsson - guitar

== Discography ==
- Signum Regis (2008)
- The Eyes of Power (2010)
- Exodus (2013)
- Through The Storm (EP) (2015)
- Chapter IV: The Reckoning (2015)
- Decennium Primum (2017)
- Addendum Primum (EP) (2017)
- The Seal of a New World (2019)
- Flag of Hope (2020)
- Exodus (Remixed & Remastered) (2022)
- Made in Switzerland (Live) (2022)
- Chapter IV: The Reckoning (Version 2023) (2023)
- Undivided (2023)
- Beyond Spacetime (2026)
