= Crossfade (Swedish band) =

Swedish rock/pop band

- Origin: Sweden
- Genres: Rock, jazz rock
- Years active: 1999–present
- Labels: MTM, Nippon Crown, Songwork
- Members: Lars Hallbäck; Richard Stenström; Göran Edman
- Website: crossfade.nu

Crossfade is a Swedish band. Its core members are Lars Hallbäck, Richard Stenström and Göran Edman. The band's music, according to Rock Hard magazine is a blend of AOR and West Coast ballad rock. As stated by The Midland Rocks, "Crossfade don't succumb to the saminess or pale imitation syndromes that afflicts so many bands in this genre." Adding to the Crossfade sound are well known musicians like, singer Göran Edman, (known from Yngwie Malmsteen, Brazen Abbot), drummer Per Lindvall (ABBA, A-ha), bass player Sven Lindvall (A-ha, Kullrusk) and saxophone player Wojtek Goral (Stevie Wonder, Peter Getz) among others.

The first album White on Blue was released in 2004 on the German label MTM, and in Japan by Nippon Crown.

Seven years later, the sequel Secret Love was released in 2011 on the Songwork label. The album, recorded at Fenix recording studios contains a classic Red Book CD and a disc with the far higher audio quality DVD-Audio, in surround mix format.

== Discography ==
- White on Blue (2004)
- Secret Love (2011)
- Carousel (2019)
- Innocent Days (2023)
