= Saunders Hill =

Coordinates: 66°19′S 110°32′E

Saunders Hill is a rounded, rocky hill which projects into the southeast part of O'Brien Bay, just east of the Windmill Islands. First mapped from air photos taken by U.S. Navy Operation Highjump, 1946–47. Named by Advisory Committee on Antarctic Names (US-ACAN) after William Y. Saunders, biologist at Wilkes Station in 1961.
