= Nikolo Kotzev's Nostradamus =

Studio album by Nikolo Kotzev
- Released: May 31, 2001
- Recorded: 1998–2000
- Genre: Rock opera
- Length: 101:15
- Label: SPV Records
- Producer: Nikolo Kotzev

Professional ratings
Review scores
Source	Rating
Allmusic	link

Nikolo Kotzev's Nostradamus is a rock opera in three acts written by Nikolo Kotzev about the life and times of Nostradamus. It was released in a 2-CD set in 2001; it has been performed live for the first time in Ruse, Bulgaria, on November 18 and 19, 2016 under the baton of Nayden Todorov. Several members of Kotzev's main project, Brazen Abbot, also appear on this album.

== Track listing ==
=== CD one ===
1. "Overture" (Instrumental) – 2:58
2. "Pieces of a Dream" – 5:41
3. "Desecration" – 5:39
4. "Introduction" – 4:47 See below
5. "Home Again" (Instrumental) – 1:29 See below
6. "Henriette" – 5:11
7. "Caught Up in a Rush" – 4:50
8. "The Eagle" – 5:19
9. "Plague" – 5:49
10. "Inquisition" – 5:03
11. "The King Will Die" – 4:33
12. "I Don't Believe" – 4:32
13. "Try to Live Again" – 3:58

=== CD two ===
1. "War of Religions" – 3:09
2. "The Inquisitor's Rage" – 2:48
3. "Chosen Man" – 6:21
4. "World War II" – 5:39
5. "World War III" – 5:14
6. "Because of You" – 6:05
7. "The End of the World" – 5:34
8. "I'll Remember You" – 6:36

All songs were written by Nikolo Kotzev.

== Personnel ==
- Nikolo Kotzev - production, mixing, composition

=== Singers/Cast ===
- Joe Lynn Turner - Nostradamus
- Alannah Myles - Anne Gemelle
- Sass Jordan - Queen Catherine of France
- Glenn Hughes - King Henri II of France
- Göran Edman - Soldier/Ghost
- Jørn Lande - Inquisitor
- Doogie White - Storyteller

=== Musicians ===
- Nikolo Kotzev - Guitars, Violin
- Mic Michaeli - Organ
- John Levén - Bass
- Ian Haugland - Drums
- The Sofia Strings Symphonic Orchestra conducted by Nelko Kolarov

== Notes ==
On the initial pressing of the CD, the tracks "Introduction" and "Home Again" were accidentally switched. While the mistake was corrected on later pressings, the mishap has resulted in some confusion, particularly as most of the promo versions sent to the media are from this initial pressing. The track list above is the correct track list.
