= Lo-Fi India Abuse =

Studio album by Muslimgauze
- Released: 1999 August
- Label: BSI Records BSI 1999-3

Professional ratings
Review scores
Source	Rating
Allmusic	link

Lo-Fi India Abuse is an album by Muslimgauze.

== Pressings ==
- 1999 August: CD on BSI Records (catalog number: BSI 1999–3).
- 2000 February 22: 12" vinyl on BSI Records (catalog number: BSI 1999–3). Limited to 100 copies.

== Credits ==
- Artwork By - Ezra Ereckson
- Featuring [Source Tracks] - Systemwide
- Mastered By - Sound Secretion
- Photography - Tracy Harrison
- Recorded By - Muslimgauze
- Notes: All tracks recorded 1998
- Some tracks are re-mixs from Systemwide's "Sirius" (BSI 1997–2)

== Track listing ==
=== CD ===
1. "Antalya" - 3:22
2. "Romanic Abuse" - 2:09
3. "Valencia In Flames" - 3:30
4. "Al Souk Dub" - 6:13
5. "Catacomb Dub" - 6:06
6. "Dust Of Saqqara" - 7:57
7. "Android Cleaver" - 4:25
8. "Dogon Tabla" - 3:30
9. "Nommos' Afterburn" - 6:21

=== 12" vinyl ===
Side A

1. "Antalya"
2. "Romanic Abuse"
3. "Valencia In Flames"
4. "Al Souk Dub"
5. "Catacomb Dub"

Side B

1. "Dust Of Saqqara"
2. "Android Cleaver"
3. "Dogon Tabla"
4. "Nommos' Afterburn"
