= Edman Island =

Island in Antarctica

- Location within Antarctica

Geography
- Location: Antarctica
- Coordinates: 66°18′S 110°32′E

Administration
- Administered under the Antarctic Treaty System

Demographics
- Population: Uninhabited

Edman Island is an island near the center of O'Brien Bay, Budd Coast. It was first mapped from air photos taken by U.S. Navy Operation Highjump and Operation Windmill in 1947 and 1948, and was named by the Advisory Committee on Antarctic Names for Donald H. Edman, an ionospheric scientist and a member of the Wilkes Station party of 1958.

== See also ==
- List of antarctic and sub-antarctic islands
