= Abu Nidal (album) =

Studio album by Muslimgauze
- Released: 1987
- Label: Limited Editions; LIMITED 6

Muslimgauze chronology
Jazirat-Ul-Arab (1987)	Abu Nidal (1987)	Coup D'Etat (1987)

Professional ratings
Review scores
Source	Rating
Allmusic	4/5 stars

Abu Nidal is an album by Muslimgauze titled after Abu Nidal. This album was dedicated to the PLO. Although the album was only pressed to 12" vinyl, all songs on side B were later included on the CD compilation Coup D'Etat/Abu Nidal. The album was described by Allmusic as "both a fine piece of music and a masterful piece of political agitprop".

== Track listing ==
Side A: "Gulf War (Part One – Two – Three)"

1. (Gulfwar part one) – 3.58
2. (Gulfwar part two) – 8.43
3. (Gulfwar part three) – 6.37

Side B

1. "Abu Nidal" – 7.28
2. "Green Is The Colour Of The Prophet" – 8.25
3. "Fatwa (Religious Decree Giving Recourse To Terrorism)" – 6.13
