= Impulse (band) =

Impulse(BG)
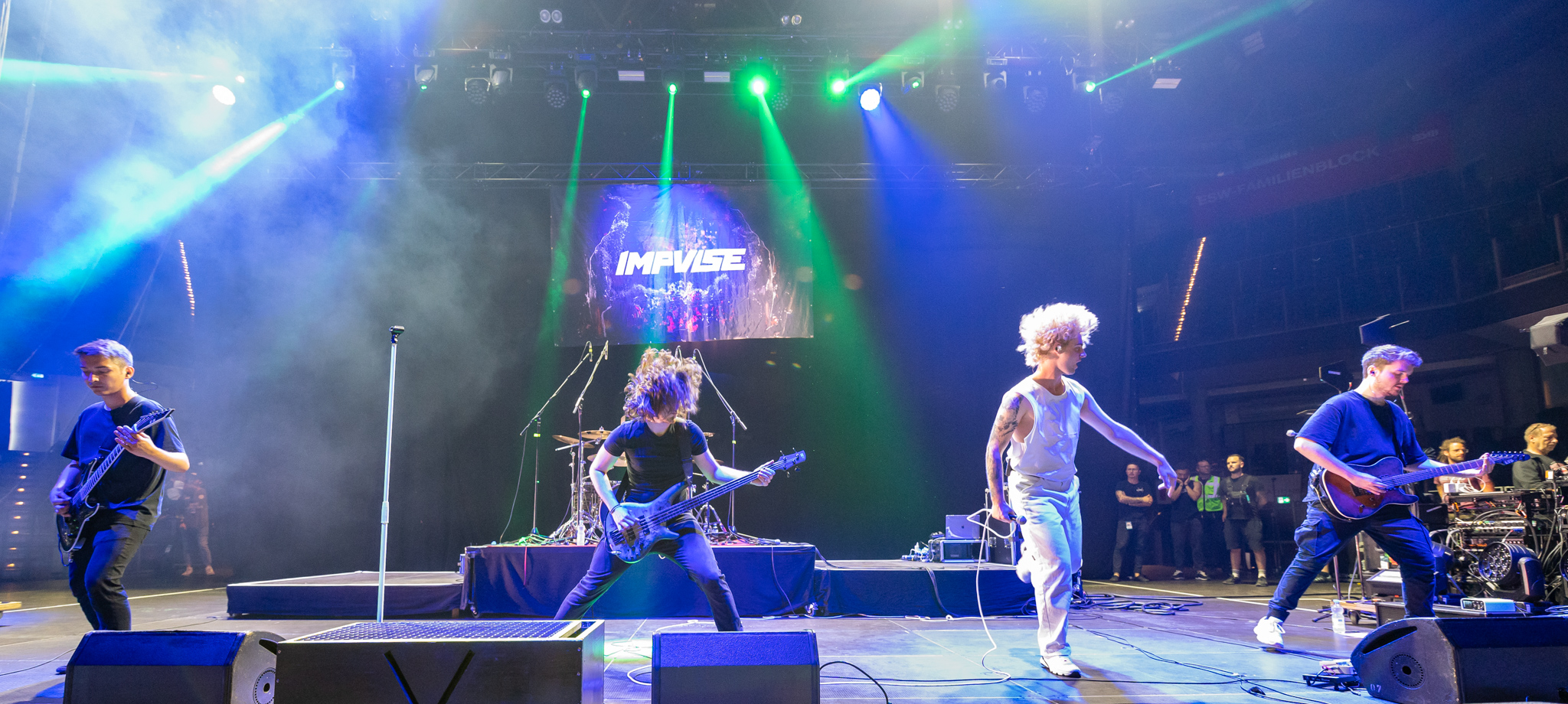
- Impulse performing at Rock im Park 2022 in Nueremberg

Background information
- Origin: Bulgaria
- Genres: hard rock, pop rock, progressive rock (early) heavy metal, power metal, speed metal (later) progressive rock (now)
- Years active: 1979–1991, 1995–1996, 2012–present
- Labels: Balkanton, Riva Sound
- Members: Teodor Koychinov; Peyo Peev; Vasil Stoev; Yana Georgieva; Boyan Parushev
- Past members: Iliya Kunchev; Vili Kavaljiev; Chavdar Panev; Biser Batov; Stefan Bachvarov; Chavdar Stefanov; Viktor Grancharov; Krasimir Manolov; Veselin Marinov; Nelko Kolarov; Nikolo Kotzev; Atanas Georgiev; Petar Petrov - Shushu; Galin Velichovski; Todor Varbanov; Kuzman Birbochukov; Danail Godzev; Ivo Komitov; Orlin Radinski - Lincha; Svetoslav Kolev; Vladimir Mihaylov; Georgi Enchev; Emil Stefanov; Ivo Ikonomov; Dimitar Karnev

Impulse is a Bulgarian rock/metal group, formed by Iliya Kunchev in March 1979. They have released six albums, the most famous being "Gladiator".

== History ==
The band was formed in March 1979 by Iliya Kunchev. In the first line-up also were Vasil Stoev, Peyo Peev, Chavdar Panev and Vili Kavaljiev. The start of group came on Bulgarian National Radio. In the beginning they played melodic pop rock songs. Famous Bulgarian singer Veselin Marinov was the band's vocalist in 1981–1983. The most famous Impulse song with Marinov on vocals is "Srednoshtna muzika" (en. "Midnight music"). In 1984 Impulse recorded their first album, called Impulse 1. The ballad "Ako ti si otidesh za mig" (en. "If you go away for moment") became a hit. This song is in the BG Radio's chart "500 greatest Bulgarian songs". In period 1985–1987 Impulse had a concerts in USSR and countries from Africa. The band recorded the album 380 Volts, but it was forbidden by the communist regime. During that period band released only two new songs.

In the late 1980s, Impulse was one of the first Bulgarian heavy metal bands. In December 1987, Iliya Kunchev changed the line-up. Vocalist and lead guitarist became Georgi "Dzoro" Encev (later played with Czech band "Titanic") . With Encev, Vladimir Mihaylov (bass) and Emil Stefanov (drums), the band released their most successful album "Gladiator". In 1988, the song "Gladiator" became the first heavy metal song played on the Bulgarian television on the show "Melodia na godinata" (en. "Melody of the year"). In 1990, Impulse were Scorpions's support band. In 1991, the band split-up. In 1993, the label Hot Metal Records released Gladiator in split with the first album of Hungarian band Missió.

In 1995, Impulse released their album Bad Chick. Iliya Kunchev, Atanas Georgiev, Dimitur Kurnev and Maxim Hristov recorded the new songs. In 1996, Impulse split-up again. In 1998 Iliya Kunchev released a compilation with the best songs of band. In this release were included rare live versions of "Gladiator" and "Srednoshtna muzika".

The band has been active again since September 2012, when the members of first line-up Vasil Stoev and Peyo Peev reunited Impulse.

== Discography ==
=== Albums ===
- Impulse 1 - 1984
- 380 Volts - 1986
- Gladiator - 1989
- Bad Chick - 1995
- Autopsy of a State - 1998

=== Singles ===
- "VIG Impulse" - 1980
- "Zakusnyalo Echo" - 1984

=== Compilations ===
- 20 years Strong Rock - 1998
