= Eclipse (Yngwie Malmsteen album) =

Studio album by Yngwie Malmsteen
- Released: May 8, 1990
- Studio: Criteria Studios, Miami
- Genre: Neoclassical metal; heavy metal; hard rock
- Length: 48:58
- Label: Polydor
- Producer: Yngwie Malmsteen

Yngwie Malmsteen chronology
Trial by Fire: Live in Leningrad (1989)	Eclipse (1990)	The Yngwie Malmsteen Collection (1991)

Singles from Eclipse
- 1. "Making Love" / "Eclipse" Released: 1990; 2. "Save Our Love" / "Motherless Child" Released: 1990; 3. "Bedroom Eyes" Released: 1990

Eclipse is the fifth studio album by guitarist Yngwie Malmsteen, released in 1990 through Polydor Records. The album reached No. 112 on the US Billboard 200 and remained on that chart for six weeks, as well as reaching the top 50 in six other countries.

== Critical reception ==
Professional ratings
Review scores
Source	Rating
AllMusic	3.5/5 stars

Steve Huey at AllMusic gave Eclipse 3.5 stars out of 5, describing it as sounding "like a holding pattern—Malmsteen turns in a competent set of neo-classical rockers that achieve radio-ready status better than much of the material on Odyssey, but there isn't anything that sounds new here."

== Track listing ==
All music is composed by Yngwie Malmsteen.

No.	Title	Lyrics	Length
1.	"Making Love"	Yngwie Malmsteen, Göran Edman	4:56
2.	"Bedroom Eyes"	Malmsteen, Edman	4:02
3.	"Save Our Love"	Malmsteen	5:24
4.	"Motherless Child"	Malmsteen	4:13
5.	"Devil in Disguise"	Malmsteen, Erica Norberg	6:11
6.	"Judas"	Malmsteen, Edman	4:25
7.	"What Do You Want"	Malmsteen	3:49
8.	"Demon Driver"	Malmsteen, Norberg	3:25
9.	"Faultline"	Malmsteen, Edman	5:08
10.	"See You in Hell (Don't Be Late)"	Malmsteen	3:39
11.	"Eclipse"	(instrumental)	3:46
Total length:			48:58

Japanese edition bonus track
No.	Title	Lyrics	Length
12.	"Making Love" (extended guitar mix)	Malmsteen, Edman	6:22

== Personnel ==
- Yngwie Malmsteen – guitar, guitar synthesizer, Moog Taurus, backing vocals, arrangement, producer
- Göran Edman – lead vocals
- Mats Olausson – keyboard, backing vocals
- Michael Von Knorring – drums
- Svante Henryson – bass, backing vocals

Technical

- Tom Fletcher – engineering, mixing
- Keith Rose – assistant engineer
- Roger Hughes – assistant engineer
- Bob Ludwig – mastering

== Charts ==
=== Weekly charts ===
Chart performance for Eclipse
Chart (1990)	Peak position
Australian Albums (ARIA)	46
Dutch Albums (Album Top 100)	38
European Albums (IFPI)	37
Finnish Albums (ÄKT)	4
German Albums (Offizielle Top 100)	31
Japanese Albums (Oricon)	11
Norwegian Albums (VG-lista)	19
Spanish Albums (AFYVE)	20
Swedish Albums (Sverigetopplistan)	12
Swiss Albums (Schweizer Hitparade)	15
UK Albums (OCC)	43
US Billboard 200	112
