= Don't Set Your Dogs on Me =

Album by Coma

Studio album by Coma
- Released: 8 February 2013
- Genre: Rock, hard rock
- Label: earMUSIC/Edel, Mystic Production
- Producer: Tomasz Zalewski

Coma chronology
Untitled album (Czerwony album) (2011)	Don't Set Your Dogs on Me (2013)

Don't Set Your Dogs on Me is a studio album by Polish rock band Coma, released on 8 February 2013. The album is distributed in Poland through Mystic Production, and worldwide through German label earMUSIC/Edel. The album was produced by Tomasz Zalewski.

== Background and recording ==
Don't Set Your Dogs on Me contains songs from Coma's 2011 untitled record, commonly known as Czerwony album (The Red Album). However, the band's frontman Piotr Rogucki wrote new lyrics for all the tracks. An additional track, titled "Song 4 Boys", was written for the soundtrack of Polish TV series Misja Afghanistan, in which Rogucki (who is also an actor) played one of the lead characters. Don't Set Your Dogs on Me is Coma's second English-language album, the first one being Excess (2010).

== Promotion ==
The album was promoted by several music videos. An official music video for "With You" was released onto YouTube on 17 December 2012. On 17 January 2013, footage from a rehearsal of "Rainy Song" was released. An official music video for "Song 4 Boys" was released on 20 March 2013.

== Track listing ==
No.	Title	Length
1.	"Keep the Peace"	3:11
2.	"With You"	2:21
3.	"Always Summer"	3:02
4.	"Dance with a Queen"	4:00
5.	"Rainy Song"	3:18
6.	"Late"	3:55
7.	"Lion"	7:25
8.	"Furious Fate"	5:11
9.	"Don't Set Your Dogs on Me"	3:20
10.	"Song 4 Boys"	2:56
11.	"Moscow"	6:58
12.	"A Better Man"	5:13
13.	"When the Music Is a Flame"	5:10

== Personnel ==
Coma

- Piotr Rogucki – vocals
- Dominik Witczak – guitar
- Marcin Kobza – guitar
- Rafał Matuszak – bass guitar
- Adam Marszałkowski – drums

== Charts ==
Chart (2013)	Peak position
Polish Albums (ZPAV)	6

== Release history ==
Region	Date	Format	Label
Worldwide	8 February 2013	CD, digital download	earMUSIC/Edel
Poland	8 February 2013	CD, digital download	Mystic Production
