= Niclas Edman =

Swedish professional ice hockey player

- Born: March 26, 1991 (age 34) Stockholm, Sweden
- Height: 6 ft 3 in (191 cm)
- Weight: 194 lb (88 kg; 13 st 12 lb)
- Position: Defence
- Shot: Left
- Played for: Skåre BK; Färjestads BK; IF Troja-Ljungby; HV71; Unibet Stars; Frederikshavn White Hawks; SønderjyskE Ishockey; Forshaga IF; IFK Munkfors
- Playing career: 2008–2022

Niclas Edman (born March 26, 1991) is a Swedish professional ice hockey player. He played with Färjestads BK in the Elitserien during the 2010–11 Elitserien season.

== Career statistics ==
			Regular season					Playoffs
Season	Team	League	GP	G	A	Pts	PIM	GP	G	A	Pts	PIM
2006–07	Färjestad BK J18	J18 Allsvenskan	9	0	3	3	8	8	1	0	1	2
2007–08	Färjestad BK J18	J18 Elit	17	2	3	5	34	—	—	—	—	—
2007–08	Färjestad BK J18	J18 Allsvenskan	14	0	4	4	47	8	0	1	1	6
2008–09	Färjestad BK J18	J18 Elit	17	4	10	14	96	—	—	—	—	—
2008–09	Färjestad BK J18	J18 Allsvenskan	13	5	2	7	14	4	0	1	1	10
2008–09	Skåre BK	Division 1	2	0	1	1	4	—	—	—	—	—
2009–10	Skåre BK J20	J20 Elit	5	3	2	5	4	—	—	—	—	—
2009–10	Skåre BK	Division 1	33	2	6	8	43	—	—	—	—	—
2010–11	Färjestad BK	Elitserien	2	0	0	0	0	—	—	—	—	—
2010–11	Skåre BK J20	J20 Elit	2	1	3	4	29	—	—	—	—	—
2010–11	Skåre BK	Division 1	35	3	9	12	44	—	—	—	—	—
2011–12	IF Troja-Ljungby	HockeyAllsvenskan	49	1	5	6	40	—	—	—	—	—
2012–13	IF Troja-Ljungby	HockeyAllsvenskan	47	2	3	5	51	—	—	—	—	—
2012–13	HV71	Elitserien	1	0	0	0	0	—	—	—	—	—
2013–14	IF Troja-Ljungby	HockeyAllsvenskan	47	0	1	1	40	—	—	—	—	—
2014–15	Unibet Stars	Denmark	30	6	12	18	32	—	—	—	—	—
2015–16	Frederikshavn White Hawks	Denmark	34	7	21	28	22	13	1	4	5	4
2016–17	SønderjyskE Ishockey	Denmark	1	0	2	2	0	—	—	—	—	—
2017–18	Forshaga IF	Hockeyettan	12	4	7	11	22	—	—	—	—	—
2018–19	Forshaga IF	Hockeyettan	23	7	10	17	42	5	1	0	1	0
2019–20	Forshaga IF	Hockeyettan	32	9	13	22	24	—	—	—	—	—
2020–21	IFK Munkfors	Division 2	1	1	2	3	0	—	—	—	—	—
2021–22	IFK Munkfors	Division 2	19	10	15	25	28	9	1	2	3	22
Elitserien totals			3	0	0	0	0	—	—	—	—	—
Denmark totals			65	13	35	48	54	13	1	4	5	4
HockeyAllsvenskan totals			143	3	9	12	131	—	—	—	—	—
Hockeyettan (Division 1) totals			137	25	46	71	179	5	1	0	1	0
