= O'Brien Bay =

Bay in Antarctica

O'Brien Bay (66°18′S 110°32′E) is a bay lying between Bailey Peninsula and Mitchell Peninsula on the Budd Coast. First mapped from air photos taken by U.S. Navy Operation Highjump and Operation Windmill in 1947 and 1948. Named by the Advisory Committee on Antarctic Names (US-ACAN) for Lieutenant Clement E. O'Brien, United States Navy, communications officer with U.S. Navy Operation Windmill which established astronomical control stations in the Windmill Islands in 1948.

== See also ==
- Saunders Hill
