= Brazen Abbot =

Finnish rock band

- Origin: Mariehamn, Åland, Finland
- Genres: Hard rock
- Years active: 1994–1998, 2002–2010
- Labels: USG, SPV, Frontiers
- Members: Nikolo Kotzev; Tony Harnell; Göran Edman; Joe Lynn Turner; Erik Mårtenson; Nelko Kolarov; Wayne Banks; Mattias Knutas
- Past members: Glenn Hughes; Thomas Vikström; Jørn Lande; Mic Michaeli; Lars Pollack; Svante Henryson; John Levén; Ian Haugland; Thomas Broman

Brazen Abbot is a Finnish rock band. Originally a studio project of Bulgarian guitarist, producer and song writer Nikolo Kotzev, who is a Finnish resident, the band has since made several live performances.

One of the defining aspects of Brazen Abbot is the employment of multiple singers; every album features three or four singers, with Göran Edman and Joe Lynn Turner having appeared on most Brazen Abbot albums. Nikolo Kotzev originally intended to use only one singer; original singer Göran Edman could only commit to recording two songs for the first album due to contractual obligations. Glenn Hughes was then supposed to record the remaining songs; however contractual obligations hindered him from recording more than three songs, at which point Kotzev brought in Thomas Vikström to record the remaining songs. Kotzev was so pleased with the result that he decided to keep using multiple singers for future albums. When performing live, however, Joe Lynn Turner is typically the only singer.

Several of the band members have also appeared on Nikolo Kotzev's ambitious rock opera Nostradamus (2001); Brazen Abbot was on hiatus during the time Kotzev was working on the rock opera (1998–2001).

Former members include Mic Michaeli, John Levén and Ian Haugland, all members of the famous rock band Europe.

== Members ==
=== Current members ===
- Nikolo Kotzev - guitars, violin, production, mixing
- Göran Edman - vocals
- Joe Lynn Turner - vocals (1996- )
- Tony Harnell - vocals (2005- )
- Erik Mårtensson - vocals (2005- )
- Nelko Kolarov - organs (2005- )
- Wayne Banks - bass (2004- )
- Mattias Knutas - drums (2005- )

=== Former members ===
- Glenn Hughes - vocals (1995)
- Thomas Vikström - vocals (1995–1997)
- Jørn Lande - vocals (2003)
- Mic Michaeli - keyboards (1995–2003)
- Lars Pollack - keyboards (2004)
- Svante Henryson - bass (1995)
- John Levén - bass (1996–2003)
- Ian Haugland - drums (1995–2003)
- Thomas Broman - drums (2004)

== Discography ==
- Live and Learn (1995)
- Eye of the Storm (1996)
- Bad Religion (1997)
- Guilty as Sin (2003)
- A Decade of Brazen Abbot (live) (2004)
- My Resurrection (2005)

== See also ==
- Nikolo Kotzev
