= VII Gates =

Swedish metal band

VII Gates is a heavy metal band from Sweden, started in 1999 by Swedish guitarist and composer Jonas Arvidsson. The band got signed by Soundriot Records in 2002, and released the first album Fire, walk with me in 2003/2004. The album was very well received in most magazines and ezines around the world. One song from this album, "The saviour" was also released as a video.

However, something happened between VII Gates and Soundriot Records, and the cooperation ended in late 2004. The band was then signed by Lion Music, but took almost three years to complete the second album In hoc signo vinces. This album was far more complex than the first, and wasn't as well received either.

== Discography ==
- Fire, walk with me (2003, Soundriot Records)
- In hoc signo vinces (2008, Lion Music)

== Current members ==
- Mick van Slowfoot – Drums
- Criss Blackburn – Vocals
- Robert Makek – Guitars
- Nicola Posa – Bass

== Previous members ==
- JJ Rockford – Guitars
- David Agnsvik – Bass
- Magnus Jakobsson – Bass
- Tim Diaz – Keyboards
- Morgan Andersson – Bass
