= Mullah Said =

Studio album by Muslimgauze
- Released: July 1998
- Studio: The Abraham Mosque, Manchester
- Genre: Tribal ambient; ambient techno; sound collage; dub
- Length: 1:05:18
- Label: Staalplaat; MUSLIMLIM018
- Producer: Bryn Jones; John Delf

Muslimgauze chronology
Sonar Vs Muslimgauze (1998)	Mullah Said (1998)	In Search of Ahmad Shah Masood (1998)

Professional ratings
Review scores
Source	Rating
Allmusic	link

Mullah Said is a studio album by British experimental musician Bryn Jones, best known under the name of his primary musical project Muslimgauze. It was released in July 1998.

In its three decennial iterations on Staalplaat, one of two record labels that Jones depended on for releasing music in the 1990s until his death, it was originally released as a digipak CD limited to an edition of 1,000 hand-numbered copies, followed by a repress in 2008, and finally a reissue on vinyl limited to 500 copies in 2018. It has been regarded as a definitive Muslimgauze album.

== Background and production ==
"Latest instalment [sic] in the limited edition series. Trance Arab vibes of laid back dubby styled music. To add to the relaxed feel of this CD it comes in a raw board digipak with nice images from the Arab world - no harshness or aggressiveness this time around."

—Staalplaat press release, 1998

Mullah Said has been regarded as one of the greatest Muslimgauze releases, and has been considered a definitive and essential album of his discography, as well as an underground ethnic electronica cult classic. On YouTube, the title track of Mullah Said is the most viewed and streamed Muslimgauze track, with above 300,000 views.

John Delf, an engineer involved with multiple Muslimgauze albums recorded in his Manchester studio, the Abraham Mosque, assisted with production and engineering; it was the last Muslimgauze album he worked on before Bryn Jones' death in January 1999, from which onward he continued to produce posthumous releases.

== Composition ==
A 1999 review of Mullah Said written by Glenn Hammett & Steve Taylor for their publication, The Raging Consciousness, proclaimed that 'those not familiar with Jones' style will listen slack-jawed at the shear anticipatory nature of his sound collage'. Upon the release of its 2018 vinyl reissue, record distributor Boomkat described it in a review as 'fall[ing] squarely in the category of crisp, richly layered and dubbed-out Bryn Jones productions'.

The review also identified elements such as a repetitive dub bass beat, 'waves' of electronic Middle Eastern strings and voices, and layers of building hand percussion, familiar elements of Muslimgauze's stylistic musical palette. Alongside this and the somber, distinctively warm Arabesque-synth tone of his ambient techno oriented albums, another familiar element present in prior albums like "Veiled Sisters" and "Maroon", the opening of the album features a sample of an Islamic call to prayer among other field recordings of the Middle East. Meanwhile, the two-minute outro track, "An End", features a lo-fi sample of a solo female Punjabi vocalist played over looped peacock calls and an occasional percussion loop with an indecipherable voice.

== Critical reception ==
Critical reception for Mullah Said upon its release was positive. An All-Music Guide review notes that as a distinct album in the Muslimgauze discography, it 'concentrates on the softer yet still ominous side of Muslimgauze, coming across as meditative, late-night music which still has an understated edge to it all'. Glenn Hammett & Steve Taylor, for their publication The Raging Consciousness, gave the album two ratings: 8 for 'Music', and 10 for 'Sound'. They also commented that it is 'a rare, beautiful recording that is at times quite sad. This is also one of the most brutally dynamic and open (read; no boundaries).' Anthony D'Amico, writing for Brainwashed, proclaimed the album to be 'one of the most radical and inventive "outsider" albums to ever emerge from the dub tradition'.

== Track listing ==
All tracks are written by Bryn Jones

No.	Title	Length
1.	"Mullah Said"	12:17
2.	"Every Grain of Palestinian Sand"	10:32
3.	"Muslims Die India"	12:31
4.	"Every Grain of Palestinian Sand"	10:53
5.	"Muslims Die India"	16:27
6.	"An End"	2:38
Total length:		1:05:18

== Personnel ==
Credits adapted from their original wording in liner notes.

- Muslimgauze – writing, performer
- John Delf – engineering, producing
