= Nelko Kolarov =

- Born: July 19, 1959 (age 67); Varna, People's Republic of Bulgaria
- Genres: Progressive rock; Soft rock; Hard rock; Classical music; Pop music
- Instruments: piano, organ
- Years active: 1981–present

Nelko Kolarov (Bulgarian: Нелко Коларов) (born July 19, 1959) is a Bulgarian composer, conductor and musician. Outside Bulgaria, Kolarov is perhaps best known for his collaborations with Nikolo Kotzev and his solo album Day of wrath.

== Biography ==
Kolarov was born in Varna. From 1981 until 1985 he was a member of the popular Bulgarian rock band Impuls, where he first got experience in writing and arranging songs.

During this period, he also studied at the Bulgarian State Conservatory in Sofia, from which he graduated in 1985 with a major in orchestra conducting. After graduation he became the conductor of the Varna Philharmonic Orchestra. Kolarov has also conducted various performances for the Varna National Opera, such as Giacomo Puccini's Gianni Schicchi, Manuel De Falla's El Amor brujo and The Wizard of Oz.

Nelko Kolarov focused primarily on composing musicals during 1989 - 1991, composing music for such musicals as The most wonderful wonder, Romantic people and Hey Poltergeist, say, all of which were performed at the Variete theater in Gabrovo.

During 1996 and 1997, several songs composed by Nelko received prizes in various pop contests and festivals throughout Bulgaria.

In 1999, Kolarov conducted The Sofia Strings for Nikolo Kotzev's rock opera Nostradamus, which was released in 2001. The rock opera also featured Glenn Hughes, Joe Lynn Turner and band members of Europe, among others.

Kolarov's first solo album, Day of wrath (Ден на гнева in Bulgarian), was also released in 2001, though it had primarily been recorded in 1998 and 1999 at the studio Metzoforte in Varna and at a studio of Chocho Vladovski. The album also features songs previously written for the musical Hey Poltergeist, say, such as Beyond boundary, I am guilty, Smile! and Sinful people.

Kolarov spends most of his time in his own studio in Varna, while also performing live at the piano bar Royal Classic together with Asen Georgiev and other Bulgarian artists as special guests.

== Discography ==
- Nelko Kolarov - Day of Wrath / Ден на гнева (2001)
- Nikolo Kotzev´s Nostradamus (2001)
- Brazen Abbot - My Resurrection (2005)
