= Trial by Fire: Live in Leningrad =

Live album by Yngwie Malmsteen
- Released: 10 October 1989
- Venue: Leningrad SKK Stadium, Leningrad, Soviet Union
- Genre: Neoclassical metal; heavy metal; hard rock
- Length: 66:30
- Label: Polydor
- Producer: Yngwie Malmsteen

Yngwie Malmsteen chronology
Odyssey (1988)	Trial by Fire: Live in Leningrad (1989)	Eclipse (1990)

Professional ratings
Review scores
Source	Rating
AllMusic	1.5/5 stars
Collector's Guide to Heavy Metal	6/10

Trial by Fire: Live in Leningrad is the first live album by Swedish guitarist Yngwie Malmsteen, recorded over several dates in February 1989 in Leningrad, Soviet Union, and released on 10 October 1989 through Polydor Records. The album reached #31 on the Swedish albums chart and #128 on the Billboard 200. A VHS video of the concert was released on 11 July 1991 through PolyGram, and a DVD edition was reissued in Japan on 12 December 2006 through Universal Music.

== Track listing ==
No.	Title	Lyrics	Music	Length
1.	"Liar"	Yngwie Malmsteen	Malmsteen	3:56
2.	"Queen in Love"	Malmsteen	Malmsteen	3:55
3.	"Deja Vu"	Joe Lynn Turner	Malmsteen	4:05
4.	"Far Beyond the Sun"	(instrumental)	Malmsteen	8:17
5.	"Heaven Tonight"	Turner	Malmsteen	4:27
6.	"Dreaming (Tell Me)"	Turner	Malmsteen	6:34
7.	"You Don't Remember, I'll Never Forget"	Malmsteen	Malmsteen	6:04
8.	"Guitar Solo (Trilogy Suite Op 5/Spasebo Blues)"	(instrumental)	Malmsteen	10:16
9.	"Crystal Ball"	Turner	Malmsteen	6:03
10.	"Black Star"	(instrumental)	Malmsteen	6:09
11.	"Spanish Castle Magic"	Jimi Hendrix	Hendrix	6:44
Total length:				66:30

=== Video release ===
1. Intro - Heaven Tonight
2. Rising Force
3. Liar
4. Queen In Love
5. Deja Vu
6. You Don't Remember, I'll Never Forget
7. Crystal Ball
8. Far Beyond the Sun
9. Dreaming (Tell Me)
10. Fury
11. Guitar Solo (Trilogy Suite Op. 5 / Spasebo Blues)
12. Heaven Tonight
13. Riot in the Dungeons
14. Black Star
15. Spanish Castle Magic
16. End Titles (Heaven Tonight)

== Personnel ==
- Yngwie Malmsteen – lead vocals (track 11), guitar, bass pedals, backing vocals, mixing, producer
- Joe Lynn Turner – lead vocals (except track 11), backing vocals (track 11)
- Jens Johansson – keyboard
- Anders Johansson – drums
- Barry Dunaway – bass, background vocals
- Tony Platt – engineering
- Mark Dearnley – mixing
- Matthew Budd – mixing assistance
- Howie Weinberg – mastering

Video credits:

- Ralph Mastrangelo – sound engineer
- Mike Downs – assistant sound engineer
- Andrew Keightley – lighting designer
- Graeme Kidd Stanton – lighting technician
- Geoffrey Horne – guitar technician
- Gareth Hughes – keyboard and bass technician
- Russell Reader – drum technician
- Neil Kirby – production manager

== Charts ==
Chart performance for Trial by Fire: Live in Leningrad
Chart (1989–1990)	Peak position
Australian Albums (ARIA)	98
Swedish Albums (Sverigetopplistan)	31
US Billboard 200	128
