= Björn Lodin =

Swedish singer

Björn Lodin (born 1965) is a Swedish singer, songwriter and producer, primarily famous for his work with his band Baltimoore.

== Biography ==
Lodin was born in Sundsvall, Sweden. He was briefly a member of two early 80s bands, Rainfall and Bedlam, before becoming the singer of Swedish rock band Six Feet Under, with whom he recorded two albums. After Six Feet Under broke up in 1984, Lodin briefly fronted Swiss rockband Krokus (band), ultimately leaving the band before appearing on any of their recordings. In 1987 Lodin was approached by Elektra Records to record a solo album. Rather than using his own name, he opted to use the moniker Baltimoore. The debut album, There's no Danger on the Roof, which also features Six Feet Under guitarist Thomas Larsson, was released in 1989.

In 1992 Lodin relocated from Sweden to Åland, Finland, where he met Bulgarian guitarist Nikolo Kotzev, who subsequently joined Baltimoore for two albums.

After Kotzev's departure in 1994, Baltimoore was on hiatus while Lodin pursued other projects, such as working with Finnish guitarist and producer Lars-Eric Mattsson in several bands, such as Vision and Astral Groove, and on Mattsson's solo work.

Baltimoore was resurrected in 2000, when Lodin released Original Sin, which also marked the return of Thomas Larsson to the band, on Mattsson's Lion Music record label.

Lodin eventually moved back to Sweden, and has subsequently released several Baltimoore albums. In 2006, Baltimoore ended its long-term association with Lion Music to form its own record label, BLP Music. The first two albums released on BLP Music were Baltimoore's two most recent albums, Kaleidoscope and X (both 2006).

Lodin is currently working on a new Baltimoore album, as well as a Swedish language solo album, to be released in 2007. In June 2009 he joined Hungarian supergroup Hard.

== Partial discography ==
=== With Six Feet Under ===
- Six Feet Under (1983)
- Eruption (1984)

=== With Baltimoore ===
- There's no Danger on the Roof (1989)
- Freak (1990)
- Double Density (1992)
- Thought for Food (1994)
- Original Sin (2000)
- The Best of Baltimoore (2001)
- Ultimate Tribute (2003)
- Fanatical (2005)
- Kaleidoscope (2006)
- X (2006)
- Quick Fix (2009)

=== With Lars Eric Mattsson / Mattsson ===
- Lars-Eric Mattsson – Obsession (1998)
- Mattsson – Another Dimension (2000)

=== With BALLS ===
- Chameleon (2008)

=== With HARD ===
- Time Is Waiting For No One (2010)
- Even Keel (2011)

=== Others ===
- Astral Groove – Astral Groove (1995)
- Vision – Till the End of Time (1997)
- Ildikó Keresztes – Csak játszom (2010)
- Ildikó Keresztes – A démon, aki bennem van (2011)
