= Untitled Coma album =

untitled album (Czerwony album)

Studio album by Coma
- Released: October 17, 2011
- Genre: Rock, hard rock
- Length: 53:03
- Label: Mystic Production
- Producer: Tomasz Zalewski

Coma chronology
Excess (2010)	untitled album (Czerwony album) (2011)	Don't Set Your Dogs on Me (2013)

The untitled fifth studio album by Polish rock band Coma, commonly known as Czerwony album (English: The Red Album), was released on October 11, 2011, through Polish label Mystic Production. It was produced by Tomasz Zalewski.

The album debuted at number 5 on the official Polish sales chart OLiS, and charted at number 1 a week later. It was certified platinum.

== Track listing ==
No.	Title	Length
1.	"Białe krowy [White Cows]"	3:12
2.	"Na pół [On half]"	2:22
3.	"La mala educación [Bad Education]"	3:03
4.	"Angela"	4:02
5.	"Deszczowa piosenka [Rainy Song]"	3:19
6.	"Gwiazdozbiory [Constellations]"	3:55
7.	"0Rh+"	7:23
8.	"W chorym sadzie [In Sick Orchard]"	5:12
9.	"Woda leży pod powierzchnią [The Water Lies Below the Surface]"	3:19
10.	"Rudy [Ginger]"	6:59
11.	"Los, cebula i krokodyle łzy [Fate, Onion and Crocodile Tears]"	5:14
12.	"Jutro [Tomorrow]"	5:12
Total length:		53:03

== Personnel ==
Coma

- Piotr Rogucki – vocals
- Dominik Witczak – guitar, backing vocals
- Marcin Kobza – guitar, backing vocals
- Rafał Matuszak – bass guitar, backing vocals
- Adam Marszałkowski – drums, backing vocals

Additional personnel

- Tomasz Zalewski – production
- Artur Czarnecki – backing vocals
- Albert Pabijanek – photography

== Charts and certifications ==
=== Weekly charts ===
Chart (2011)	Peak position
Polish Albums (ZPAV)	1

=== Certifications ===
Region	Certification
Poland (ZPAV)	Platinum
