= Thomas Larsson (musician) =

Swedish guitarist and songwriter (born 1964)

- Born: 1964 (age 61–62); Falun, Sweden
- Genres: Hard rock
- Occupations: Musician, songwriter
- Instrument: Guitar
- Labels: Grooveyard; Zero; Sun Hill
- Member of: Baltimoore
- Formerly of: Six Feet Under; Yeah Bop Station; King Siguurd

Thomas Larsson (born 1964 in Falun, Sweden) is a Swedish guitarist and songwriter, perhaps most famous for his work with singer Glenn Hughes and with the band Baltimoore. He has also released a few solo albums.

== Biography ==
Larsson started playing the guitar at the age of twelve, after receiving his first guitar as a gift from his parents for his twelve birthday. He would join his first serious band at the age of 17 in 1982, Six Feet Under (not to be confused with the American band of the same name), which also featured future Baltimoore bandmate Björn Lodin. The band dissolved after two albums in 1994. Larsson would then work as a freelance guitarist, including working on the first Baltimoore album, There's no Danger on the Roof, in 1989, and he went on to record one album with Swedish band Yeah Bop Station. Larsson was working with the short-lived Swedish band King Siguurd, when he was approached to join Glenn Hughes' backing band, which he accepted. He left Hughes' band when his daughter Cornelia was born.

He commutes between Sweden & New York with his fiancé, Super Model Chef Entrepreneur Kersti Bowser

Larsson's first solo album, Freeride, was released in 1996 in Japan. He had been approached to record a solo album by Zero Corporation during a tour in Asia with Glenn Hughes. The album would eventually be released in Europe and other markets as well, in 2000.

== Discography ==
=== With Six Feet Under ===
- Six Feet Under (1983)
- Eruption (1984)

=== With Baltimoore ===
- There's no Danger on the Roof (1989)
- Original Sin (2000)
- The Best of Baltimoore (2001)
- Ultimate Tribute (2003)
- X (2006)

=== With Glenn Hughes ===
- From Now On... (1994)
- Burning Japan Live (1994)

=== Solo releases ===
- Freeride (1996 / 2000)
- Harmonic Passion (2006)

=== Others ===
- Yeah Bop Station - Upfront (1990)
