= Muslimgauze =

British electronic musician

- Image taken by Martin Parker from D.O.R.

Background information
- Also known as: E.g Oblique Graph
- Born: Bryn Jones; 17 June 1961; Salford, England, United Kingdom
- Died: 14 January 1999 (aged 37) Manchester, England, United Kingdom
- Genres: Ambient; dub; ethnic electronica; post-industrial
- Instruments: percussion; synth; drum machine; tape; sample discs
- Years active: 1982–1998
- Labels: Extreme; Staalplaat; Soleilmoon; Recloose; Limited Editions

Muslimgauze was the main musical project of Bryn Jones (17 June 1961 – 14 January 1999), a British experimental musician who was influenced by conflicts and history in the Muslim world, often with an emphasis on the Israeli–Palestinian conflict. With dozens of albums released under the Muslimgauze name, Jones was prolific, but he never achieved mainstream success. His music, categorized as an example of ethnic electronica, has been described by one critic as "among the most startling and unique in the noise underground".

Despite his project name, Jones was not a Muslim. The name Muslimgauze is a play on the word muslin (a type of gauze) combined with Muslim, referring to Jones' preoccupation with conflicts throughout the Muslim world.

== Biography ==
=== Early musical career ===
Jones first released music in 1982 as E.g Oblique Graph on Kinematograph, his own imprint, and the independent co-op label Recloose, run by Simon Crab. E.g Oblique Graph came from the do-it-yourself (DIY) ethos of the time and was musically composed of electronic/experimental drone with occasional synth-melodic hooks and use of radio broadcast samples.

Releases at the time were occasionally on cassette, more often vinyl EPs and LPs; the longest-running of Jones' label monikers, Limited Editions, started with Hunting Out with an Aerial Eye (1984) followed by Buddhist on Fire, put out by Recloose the same year. Since then, Jones roughly released an album a year, given scarce financial resources until 1988, when he began making inroads with then-emerging labels Staalplaat, Soleilmoon, and Extreme Records.

By the late 1980s, Jones ran out of funding to self-release, and other labels that did put out Muslimgauze releases such as Recloose and Permis De Construire (which put out Coup d'Etat) did not pay promised royalties. Recloose head Simon Crab cited lack of sales and damaged records from firebombing as his reason.

The neighbouring Thomas A Becket pub run by East End gangsters—common-or-garden low-level vicious thugs (years before the species was romanticized by Lock Stock and Mona Lisa)—unable to control our unlicensed trade in alcohol and other illicits, firebombed the building one night and attacked the crew on a regular basis. (Many of the new pressings of Muslimgauze's Buddhist on Fire stored in the Recloose offices were destroyed during this attack).

— Stalker blog post

The deal with Recloose was that we paid 50 percent of the profits to the artist and 50 percent went to the label, which was a pretty good deal, especially since we didn't sell that much. We put a lot of energy into marketing, and most of the artists signed to the label sold off the back of Bourbonese Qualk anyway. He assumed we sold loads of albums but we didn't even cover the costs.

— Simon Crab

At this time, distributors Soleilmoon, Staalplaat, and Extreme Records transitioned to becoming labels with the advent of the compact disc format, which became less expensive to produce and ship than vinyl over time and gradually became a physical staple of the Muslimgauze catalogue.

=== Later musical career ===
It was with the release of United States of Islam (1991) a formalised agreement was reached with Extreme Records, which helped fund professional studio recordings, designed attractive packaging, and used a more extensive distribution network. Though pleased at first, Jones was frustrated with Extreme's one-release-a-year policy and in 1993 signed with then-sibling labels Soleilmoon and Staalplaat, which offered a more frequent release schedule. 1993 saw the release of Vote Hezbollah, Veiled Sisters and a re-release of Iran on Soleilmoon and Hamas Arc, Satyajit Eye and Betrayal on Staalplaat. His 1998 record Mullah Said on the label has been critically acclaimed.

Jones additionally released material on nearly any small label that approached him. A drawback with releasing on so many labels was gratuitous editing by producers and, through design or circumstance, no royalties. Extreme cited betrayal by distribution networks that were unscrupulous or filed for bankruptcy and could not pay—though they also claimed to have eventually remunerated Jones. Lack of due royalties was a source of ongoing stress throughout Jones's career.

Jones once stated that he never had time to listen to other people's music, although in a 1992 interview with Impulse Magazine, he mentioned that he enjoyed traditional music of Japan, the Middle East, and India, as well as the works of artists such as Can, Throbbing Gristle, Wire, and Faust.

=== Death ===
On 30 December 1998, Jones was rushed to A&E in Manchester with a rare fungal infection in his bloodstream, for which he had to be heavily sedated. He contracted pneumonia and died on 14 January 1999.

== Legacy ==
Since Bryn Jones's death in 1999 at the age of 37, his music under Muslimgauze has continued to be released. He often inundated labels and collaborators with music, and consequently the latter had to be selective of what was eventually put out. Labels, including Soleilmoon and Staalplaat, continue to publish unreleased albums, as well as releases of demos, his own reworked tracks, and abandoned full-length tapes. Jones' posthumous discography is known for including many studio variations of nearly all his music.

In April 2014, Vinyl On Demand released Chasing the Shadow of Bryn Jones 1983–1988, a 10 LP box set reissuing early albums originally released by Product Kinematograph, Recloose Organisation, and Jones' own Limited Editions. Each LP includes bonus tracks taken from period compilation albums. The release was also accompanied by biography written by Ibrahim Khider titled Muslimgauze: Chasing the Shadow of Bryn Jones.

== Musical styles ==
Muslimgauze's music is often difficult to describe due to sheer volume, content diversity, and often singular stylings: Jones never produced any hit albums or songs. However, it is possible to describe common features of his music as he tended to use many of the same strategies, modified from album to album to give each release a distinct feel or concept. The music is often heavily electronic and strongly rhythmic (sometimes including live studio percussion), though tempos can vary from very fast to slowly driving and almost ambient, making frequent use of gradually changing structures or melodic motifs. Critic Ned Raggett reviewed a number of Muslimgauze albums for Allmusic.com, noting the diverse styles of Jones's recordings: United States of Islam (1991) featured layered percussion and "a muted techno pulse", Hamas Arc (1993) touched on a menacing "ambience that is not so far removed from the likes of [industrial metal acts] Godflesh or Scorn", and Gun Aramaic (1996) blended atmospheric sounds and vocal samples that "almost turns the album into a soundtrack for a non-existent film."

== Political beliefs ==
I would never go to an occupied land, others shouldn't. Zionists living off Arab land and water is not a tourist attraction. To have been in a place is not important. So you can't be against apartheid unless you have been in South Africa? You cannot be against the Serbs killing Muslims in Bosnia unless you have been there? I think not.

— Bryn Jones Chain D.L.K. interview

Jones originally claimed Muslimgauze was formed in response to Operation Peace of the Galilee, Israel's 1982 invasion of Lebanon. This event inspired Jones to research the conflict's origins, which grew into a lifelong artistic focal point, and he became a staunch supporter of the Palestinian cause, and often dedicated recordings to the Palestinian Liberation Organization or a free Palestine. Jones's research further grew to encompass other conflict-ridden, predominantly Muslim countries including Afghanistan, Pakistan, Chechnya, Iran, and Iraq. He concluded that Western interests for natural resources and strategic-political gain were root causes for many of these conflicts and should Western meddling halt, said regions would stabilise.

Jones frequently netted criticism for never having visited the Middle East. He said in a 1994 interview, "I don't think you can visit an occupied land. It's the principle. Not until it's free again."

Dedicated to the unknown Palestinians buried in mass graves in Al-Riqqa cemetery, Kuwait city.

— Zul'm (1992)

References in dedications, album, and track titles suggest Jones had researched the conflict regions in the Middle East, as well as Chechnya, Kashmir, Afghanistan, India, Pakistan, and Indonesia, among others. He opposed the oppression of and dedicated pieces to Tibetan Buddhists and Tamil Tigers.

When asked what he would do if conflicts in the Muslim world were peaceably resolved, Jones replied his music would champion other conflict regions such as China's occupation of Tibet.

Simon Crab of Bourbonese Qualk described Jones as "naturally Conservative and quite right-wing," noting that Jones admired Margaret Thatcher during his youth. Though Crab states, "I suspect a lot of this was just to be contrary."

Interviewer: Do you believe it is absolutely necessary, to take these political aspects into account? Or can one also uncouple the politics and music from each other?
Jones: Yes, one can do that. It is music. Music with serious political facts behind it. There are no lyrics, because that would be preaching. It is music. It is up to you, to find out more. If you don't want that, it is up to you. You can listen to only the music or you can preoccupy yourself more with it.

— Artefakt interview

== Discography ==
During his lifetime, Jones released over 90 original albums on 32 different record labels, creating nearly 2,000 original compositions. Many of his pieces were inspired by political facts or events. Many of his releases have been re-pressed as, after 1994, most of his albums were released in limited editions of 200–1,000 copies.

== Live performances ==
During the early phase of his career, Jones was known to have performed only one live show in 1986 at the V2 in s-Hertogenbosch, the Netherlands. At the behest of Bourbonese Qualk, of the Recloose label, Jones performed a half-hour set. The show consisted of Jones singing to a backing track while Simon Crab then members of Bourbonese Qualk added instrumental accompaniment. By all accounts the show went reasonably, but Jones was traumatised by the experience enough to swear off live performance until the 1990s.

Jones resumed live performance in 1995 at the behest of record store owner and DJ Simon Scott. Part of Jones's apprehension with live performance was in trying to figure out how to present the music. He concluded the best way was refrain from vocals with lyrics and instead play live percussion atop a backing track. He also did DJ sets that consisted of exclusively his own material. Contrary to his 1986 experience, Jones did enjoy doing live shows and frequently did them in his last years in diverse places such as the UK, throughout mainland Europe, and even Japan.

Date	City	Venue	Event
26 April 1986	's-Hertogenbosch, Netherlands	V2	Artitexture
3 September 1995	Edinburgh, Scotland	Wee Red Bar, Edinburgh College of Art	Color Climax organised by Blue Room (Edinburgh) & Sonora (Glasgow)
8 October 1995	Leeds, England	Cafe Mex	Sunday Service
18 February 1996	Leeds, England	The Duchess	Sunday Service
26 May 1996	Leeds, England	The Duchess	Sunday Service
31 August 1996	Ledbury, England	Eastnor Castle	The Big Chill
24 October 1996	Berlin, Germany		Staalplaat Sonderangebot Festival
17 October 1996	Leeds, England	Le Phono	Brainticket
13 April 1997	Hilversum, Netherlands	VPRO Studios	
21 June 1997	Plauen, Germany	Seehausclub	
22 June 1997	Rostock, Germany	MS Stubnitz/Rostock Harbor	
26 July 1997	Algeciras, Spain	Plaza de Toros de Algeciras	Oído de los Mundos Festival
1 November 1997	Leeds, England	The Duchess	Tandoori Space
27 January 1998	Shibuya, Japan	Club Shibuya on Air West	
4 April 1998	London, England	The Institute of Contemporary Arts	
15 April 1998	London, England	The Cross Bar	
21 May 1998	Berlin, Germany	Eschschloraque	
13 June 1998	Stockholm, Sweden	MS Stubnitz	Nursery Injection Festival
18-20 September 1998	Normandy, France		The Monastery of Sound
28 October 1998	Leeds, England	The Cockpit	Tandoori Space
28-29 November 1998	Berlin, Germany	Volksbühne	Ballroom International
