= Joe Bonamassa discography =

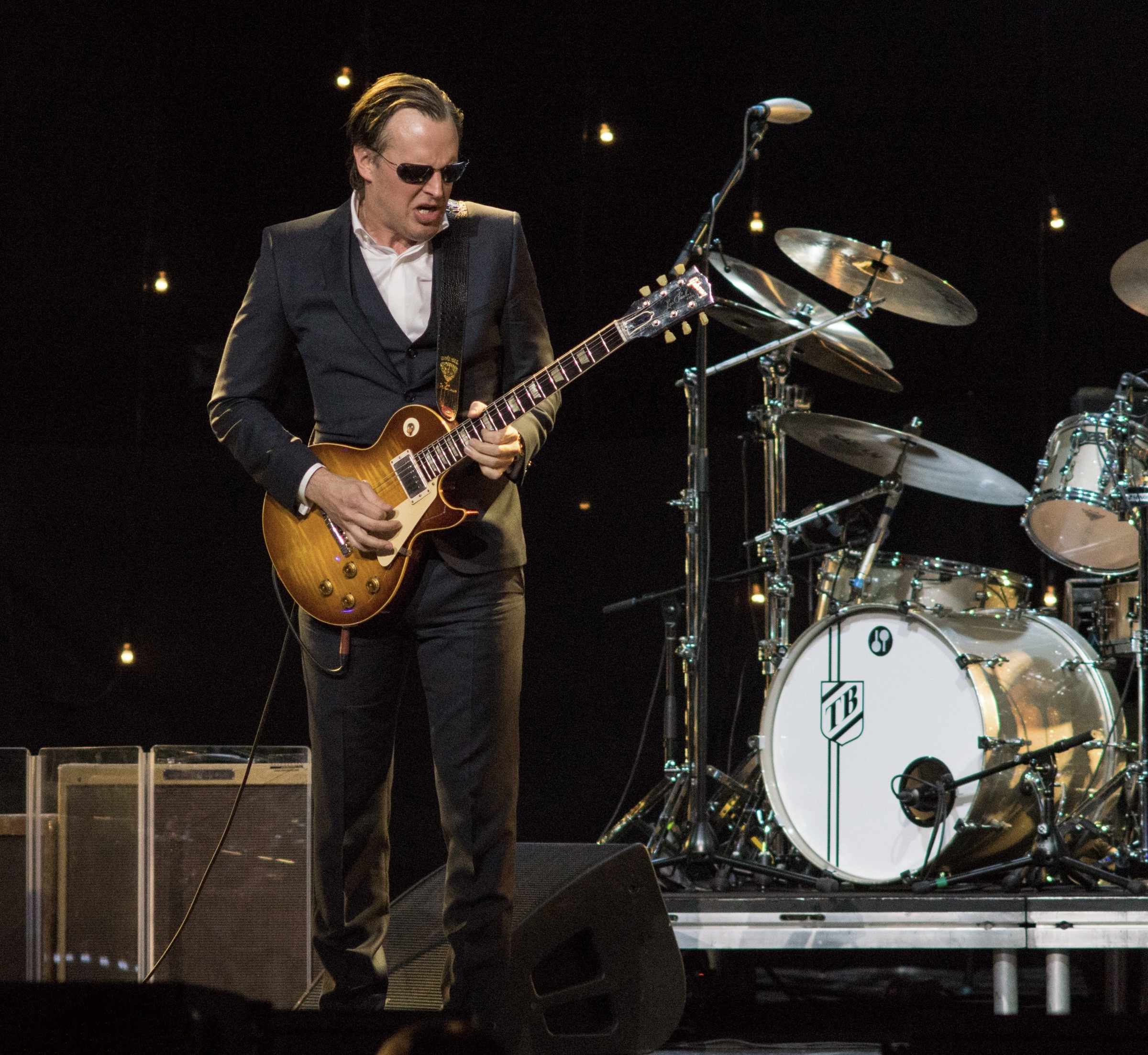
- Bonamassa performing live in 2014.
- Studio albums: 17
- Live albums: 21
- Singles: 83
- Video albums: 16
- Music videos: 32
- Collaboration albums: 5
- Singles (lead): 71
- Singles (featured): 12
- Other appearances: 55

The discography of Joe Bonamassa, an American blues rock musician, consists of seventeen studio albums, five collaboration albums, twenty-one live albums, eighty-three singles (seventy-one as lead artist and twelve as a featured artist), sixteen video albums, thirty-two music videos and fifty-five other appearances.

Bonamassa began his solo career in 2000 with the release of A New Day Yesterday. The album reached number 9 on the US Billboard Blues Albums chart two years later. The guitarist continued to see success within the blues genre, topping said chart for the first time with 2002's So, It's Like That, then again with You & Me in 2006, before making his debut on the Billboard 200 with his 2007 album Sloe Gin, which reached number 184. Bonamassa's commercial success continued to increase in later years—he reached the Billboard 200 top 40 for the first time with 2010's Black Rock, then broke the top 10 with Different Shades of Blue in 2014; on the UK Albums Chart, he reached the top 10 with five consecutive studio albums starting with Driving Towards the Daylight in 2012.

As well as regular studio releases, Bonamassa has released a string of live albums and videos from various touring cycles and special shows. His first of these to chart in the US was Live from Nowhere in Particular, which reached number 136 on the Billboard 200 and topped the Blues Albums chart in 2008. Outside his solo work, the guitarist has also collaborated with singer Beth Hart on three studio albums and a live release, with 2013's Seesaw reaching the US Billboard 200 top 50. He has also contributed songs to numerous albums by other artists, including Joe Lynn Turner, Ozzy Osbourne and Don Airey, as well as various tribute albums and compilations.

In 2020, Bonamassa created Keeping the Blues Alive Records, an independent record label that promotes and supports the talent of blues musicians. Since his latest studio album, Breakthrough (2025), Bonamassa holds the record for most number one blues albums with 29 (a total of 30 including the collaborative B.B. King's Blues Summit 100 in 2026).

== Albums ==
=== Studio albums ===
List of studio albums, with selected chart positions and certifications
Title	Album details	Peak chart positions										Certifications
Title	Album details	US	AUT	FRA	GER	NED	NOR	SCO	SWE	SWI	UK	Certifications
A New Day Yesterday	Released: October 24, 2000; Label: Okeh/Epic/550; Format: CD	(Note: A New Day Now, the 20th anniversary reissue of A New Day Yesterday, registered at number 29 on the US Billboard Top Album Sales chart.)	(Note: A New Day Now, the 20th anniversary reissue of A New Day Yesterday, registered at number 31 on the Austrian Albums Chart.)	—	(Note: A New Day Now, the 20th anniversary reissue of A New Day Yesterday, registered at number 13 on the German Albums Chart.)	(Note: A New Day Now, the 20th anniversary reissue of A New Day Yesterday, registered at number 29 on the Dutch Albums Chart.)	—	(Note: A New Day Now, the 20th anniversary reissue of A New Day Yesterday, registered at number 12 on the Scottish Albums Chart.)	—	(Note: A New Day Now, the 20th anniversary reissue of A New Day Yesterday, registered at number 33 on the Swiss Albums Chart.)	(Note: A New Day Now, the 20th anniversary reissue of A New Day Yesterday, registered at number 96 on the UK Albums Chart.)	
So, It's Like That	Released: August 13, 2002; Label: Medalist; Format: CD	—	—	—	—	—	—	—	—	—	—	
Blues Deluxe	Released: August 26, 2003; Label: Medalist; Format: CD	—	—	—	—	—	—	—	—	—	—	
Had to Cry Today	Released: August 24, 2004; Label: Premier Artists; Format: CD	—	—	—	—	—	—	—	—	—	—	
You & Me	Released: June 6, 2006; Label: Premier Artists; Formats: CD, LP	—	—	—	—	68	—		—	—	—	
Sloe Gin	Released: August 21, 2007; Label: J&R Adventures; Formats: CD, LP	184	—	—	79	27	—	62	39	—	50	
The Ballad of John Henry	Released: February 24, 2009; Label: J&R Adventures; Formats: CD, LP, DL	103	—	—	39	23	—	30	46	97	26	BPI: Silver
Black Rock	Released: March 23, 2010; Label: J&R Adventures; Formats: CD, LP, DL	39	49	108	22	28	40	16	24	60	14	
Dust Bowl	Released: March 22, 2011; Label: J&R Adventures; Formats: CD, LP, DL	37	32	115	10	12	7	13	27	17	12	BPI: Silver
Driving Towards the Daylight	Released: May 22, 2012; Label: J&R Adventures; Formats: CD, LP, DL	23	13	25	7	12	8	3	18	10	2	
Different Shades of Blue	Released: September 22, 2014; Label: J&R Adventures; Formats: CD, LP, DL	8	8	27	3	10	9	9	22	5	9	
Blues of Desperation	Released: March 25, 2016; Label: J&R Adventures; Formats: CD, LP, DL	12	3	23	3	2	9	2	9	1	3	
Redemption	Released: September 21, 2018; Label: J&R Adventures; Formats: CD, LP, DL	26	3	55	3	9	11	3	16	2	7	
Royal Tea	Released: October 23, 2020; Label: J&R Adventures; Formats: CD, LP, DL	41	3	50	5	3	39	5	47	4	7	
Time Clocks	Released: October 29, 2021; Label: J&R Adventures; Formats: CD, LP, DL	136	6	54	3	5	32	8	56	4	13	
Blues Deluxe Vol. 2	Released: October 6, 2023; Label: J&R Adventures; Formats: CD, LP, DL	(Note: Blues Deluxe Vol. 2 did not chart on the Billboard 200, but did register at number 27 on the US Billboard Top Album Sales chart.)	7	86	7	9	—	6	—	6	77	
Breakthrough	Released: July 18, 2025; Label: J&R Adventures; Formats: CD, LP, DL	—	6	—	5	6	—	—	—	5	38	
"—" denotes a release that did not chart or was not issued in that region.

=== Collaborations ===
List of collaboration albums, with selected chart positions and certifications
Title	Album details	Peak chart positions										Certifications
Title	Album details	US	AUT	FRA	GER	NED	NOR	SCO	SWE	SWI	UK	Certifications
Don't Explain (with Beth Hart)	Released: September 27, 2011; Label: J&R Adventures; Formats: CD, LP, DL	120	32	90	17	9	12	20	25	50	22	BPI: Silver
Seesaw (with Beth Hart)	Released: May 20, 2013; Label: J&R Adventures; Formats: CD, LP, CD+DVD, DL	47	20	87	19	11	4	25	25	28	27	
Ooh Yea! The Betty Davis Songbook (with Mahalia Barnes and the Soul Mates)	Released: February 24, 2015; Label: J&R Adventures; Formats: CD, LP, DL	—	—	—	—	91	—	—	—	—	—	
Black Coffee (with Beth Hart)	Released: January 26, 2018; Label: J&R Adventures; Formats: CD, LP, DL	63	7	42	4	1	14	4	27	3	7	
B.B. King's Blues Summit 100: Celebrating the King of the Blues (with various artists)	Released: February 6, 2026; Label: Keeping the Blues Alive; Formats: 2×CD, 3×LP, DL	133	7	—	4	—	—	10	—	11	—	No. 1 Blues Album
"—" denotes a release that did not chart or was not issued in that region.

=== Live albums ===
List of live albums, with selected chart positions
Title	Album details	Peak chart positions									
Title	Album details	US	AUT	BEL (Fla.)	BEL (Wal.)	FRA	GER	NED	SCO	SWI	UK
A New Day Yesterday Live	Released: 2002; Label: Premier Artists; Format: CD	—	—	—	—	—	—	—	—	—	—
Shepherds Bush Empire	Released: December 11, 2007; Label: J&R Adventures; Format: DL	—	—	—	—	—	—	—	—	—	—
Live from Nowhere in Particular	Released: August 19, 2008; Label: J&R Adventures; Formats: 2CD, 3LP	136	—	—	—	—	82	31	63	—	—
Live from the Royal Albert Hall	Released: September 22, 2009; Label: J&R Adventures; Formats: 2CD, 2LP, DL	—	—	47	—	—	—	—	—	—	—
Beacon Theatre: Live from New York	Released: September 24, 2012; Label: J&R Adventures; Formats: 2CD, 2LP, DL	56	50	70	49	107	34	45	47	65	58
An Acoustic Evening at the Vienna Opera House	Released: March 12, 2013; Label: J&R Adventures; Formats: 2CD, 2LP, DL	52	16	71	91	84	10	22	21	32	23
Live in Amsterdam (with Beth Hart)	Released: March 24, 2014; Label: J&R Adventures; Formats: 2CD, 3LP, DL	87	27	93	66	62	8	13	48	40	49
Tour de Force: Live in London – The Borderline	Released: May 19, 2014; Label: J&R Adventures; Formats: 2CD, 2LP, DL	—	—	—	—	103	—	—	—	—	—
Tour de Force: Live in London – Shepherd's Bush Empire	Released: May 19, 2014; Label: J&R Adventures; Formats: 2CD, 2LP, DL	—	—	171	151	—	—	—	—	—	—
Tour de Force: Live in London – Hammersmith Apollo	Released: May 19, 2014; Label: J&R Adventures; Formats: 2CD, 2LP, DL	—	—	169	—	—	—	73	—	—	—
Tour de Force: Live in London – Royal Albert Hall	Released: May 19, 2014; Label: J&R Adventures; Formats: 2CD, 2LP, DL	—	28	170	120	—	—	89	—	28	—
Muddy Wolf at Red Rocks	Released: March 23, 2015; Label: J&R Adventures; Formats: 2CD, 3LP, DL	35	16	51	72	84	5	13	30	12	27
Live at Radio City Music Hall	Released: October 2, 2015; Label: J&R Adventures; Formats: CD, 2LP, DL	77	—	70	103	69	17	10	37	59	43
Live at the Greek Theatre	Released: September 23, 2016; Label: J&R Adventures; Formats: 2CD, 3LP, DL	48	13	16	33	47	8	13	9	8	17
Live at Carnegie Hall: An Acoustic Evening	Released: June 23, 2017; Label: J&R Adventures; Formats: 2CD, 3LP, DL	64	22	27	55	—	8	29	18	23	30
British Blues Explosion Live	Released: May 18, 2018; Label: J&R Adventures; Formats: 2CD, 3LP, DL	83	10	37	45	50	5	20	8	5	21
Live at the Sydney Opera House	Released: October 25, 2019; Label: J&R Adventures; Formats: CD, 2LP, DL	(Note: Live at the Sydney Opera House did not chart on the Billboard 200, but did register at number 27 on the US Billboard Top Album Sales chart.)	27	31	63	93	14	41	19	19	58
Now Serving: Royal Tea Live from the Ryman	Released: June 11, 2021; Label: J&R Adventures; Formats: CD, 2LP, DL	—	23	28	106	163	5	26	7	7	51
Tales of Time	Released: April 14, 2023; Label: J&R Adventures; Formats: CD, 3LP, DL	— (Note: Tales of Time did not chart on the Billboard 200, but did register at number 18 on the US Billboard Top Album Sales chart.)	7	17	62	—	5	3	3	11	50
Live at the Hollywood Bowl with Orchestra	Released: June 21, 2024; Label: J&R Adventures; Formats: CD, 2LP, DL	— (Note: Live at the Hollywood Bowl with Orchestra did not chart on the Billboard 200, but did register at number 17 on the US Billboard Top Album Sales chart.)	8	23	51	—	6	6	5	8	92
The Spirit of Rory: Live from Cork	Released: June 19, 2026; Label: J&R Adventures; Formats: CD, 2LP, DL	— (Note: The Spirit of Rory: Live from Cork did not chart on the Billboard 200, but did register at number 22 on the US Billboard Top Album Sales chart.)	2	12	12	191	3	3	6	5	46
"—" denotes a release that did not chart or was not issued in that region.

== Singles ==
=== As lead artist ===
List of singles as lead artist, showing year released and album name
Title	Year	Album
"Miss You, Hate You"	2001	A New Day Yesterday
"Colour and Shape"	2002	A New Day Yesterday
"Chug This"	2002	So, It's Like That
"Ball Peen Hammer"	2008	Sloe Gin
"Quarryman's Lament"	2010	Black Rock
"Dust Bowl"	2011	Dust Bowl
"I'll Take Care of You" (with Beth Hart)	2011	Don't Explain
"Well, Well" (with Beth Hart)	2011	Don't Explain
"Your Heart Is as Black as Night" (with Beth Hart)	2011	Don't Explain
"Chocolate Jesus" (with Beth Hart)	2011	Don't Explain
"Driving Towards the Daylight"	2012	Driving Towards the Daylight
"I Got All You Need"	2012	Driving Towards the Daylight
"Driving Towards the Daylight" (live)	2013	An Acoustic Evening at the Vienna Opera House
"Seesaw" (with Beth Hart)	2013	Seesaw
"Miss Lady" (with Beth Hart)	2013	Seesaw
"Them There Eyes" (with Beth Hart)	2013	Seesaw
"Close to My Fire" (with Beth Hart)	2013	Seesaw
"I Love You More Than You'll Ever Know" (with Beth Hart)	2013	Seesaw
"Get Back My Tomorrow"	2014	Different Shades of Blue
"Different Shades of Blue"	2014	Different Shades of Blue
"Love Ain't a Love Song"	2015	Different Shades of Blue
"Living on the Moon"	2015	Different Shades of Blue
"Never Give All Your Heart"	2015	Different Shades of Blue
"The Valley Runs Low"	2016	Blues of Desperation
"Mountain Climbing"	2016	Blues of Desperation
"Drive"	2016	Blues of Desperation
"This Train"	2016	Blues of Desperation
"No Good Place for the Lonely"	2016	Blues of Desperation
"Song of Yesterday" (live)	2017	Live at Carnegie Hall: An Acoustic Evening
"Black Coffee" (with Beth Hart)	2017	Black Coffee
"Why Don't You Do Right"	2018	Black Coffee
"Let Me Love You Baby" (live)	2018	British Blues Explosion Live
"Redemption"	2018	Redemption
"Deep in the Blues Again"	2018	Redemption
"This Train" (live)	2019	Live at the Sydney Opera House
"Christmas Comes but Once a Year"	2019	non-album single
"A Conversation with Alice"	2020	Royal Tea
"When One Door Opens"	2020	Royal Tea
"Cradle Rock"	2020	A New Day Now
"Colour and Shape"	2020	A New Day Now
"Why Does It Take So Long to Say Goodbye"	2020	Royal Tea
"Royal Tea"	2020	Royal Tea
"High Class Girl" (live)	2021	Now Serving: Royal Tea Live at the Ryman
"Walk in My Shadow" (live)	2021	Now Serving: Royal Tea Live at the Ryman
"Why Does It Take So Long to Say Goodbye" (live)	2021	Now Serving: Royal Tea Live at the Ryman
"Notches"	2021	Time Clocks
"The Heart That Never Waits"	2021	Time Clocks
"Time Clocks"	2021	Time Clocks
"The Loyal Kind" (live)	2023	Tales of Time
"Mind's Eye" (live)	2023	Tales of Time
"Known Unknowns" (live)	2023	Tales of Time
"Time Clocks" (live)	2023	Tales of Time
"I Want to Shout About It"	2023	Blues Deluxe Vol. 2
"Twenty-Four Hour Blues"	2023	Blues Deluxe Vol. 2
"Well, I Done Got Over It"	2023	Blues Deluxe Vol. 2
"Lazy Poker Blues"	2023	Blues Deluxe Vol. 2
"Hope You Realize It (Goodbye Again)"	2023	Blues Deluxe Vol. 2
"Four Day Creep" (with Peter Frampton)	2024	non-album single
"Twenty-Four Hour Blues" (live)	2024	Live at the Hollywood Bowl with Orchestra
"The Last Matador of Bayonne" (live)	2024	Live at the Hollywood Bowl with Orchestra
"Ball Peen Hammer" (live)	2024	Live at the Hollywood Bowl with Orchestra
"If Heartaches Were Nickels" (live)	2024	Live at the Hollywood Bowl with Orchestra
"Hold on Loosely" (with Train)	2024	non-album singles
"Better the Devil You Know"	2024	non-album singles
"Scarlet Town"	2024	non-album singles
"Breaking Up Somebody's Home" (live)	2024	non-album singles
"Fortune Teller Blues"	2025	non-album singles
"Shake This Ground"	2025	Breakthrough
"Still Walking with Me"	2025	Breakthrough
"Breakthrough"	2025	Breakthrough
"Drive By the Exit Sign"	2025	Breakthrough
"—" denotes a release that did not chart or was not issued in that region.

=== As featured artist ===
List of singles as featured artist, showing year released and album name
Title	Year	Album
"The Core" (Shannon Curfman featuring Joe Bonamassa)	2010	What You're Getting Into
"This Ol' World" (Sandi Thom featuring Joe Bonamassa)	2010	Merchants and Thieves
"Steppin' in Her I. Miller Shoes" (Mahalia Barnes and the Soul Mates featuring Joe Bonamassa)	2015	Ooh Yea! The Betty Davis Songbook
"On and On" (The Cloudberries featuring Joe Bonamassa)	2016	non-album single
"Blues Comin' On" (Dion featuring Joe Bonamassa)	2020	Blues with Friends
"Wind in Your Hair" (Steve Louw featuring Joe Bonamassa)	2021	Headlight Dreams
"Mother, Don't Go" (Steve Louw featuring Bonamassa)	2022	Thunder and Rain
"That's What Love Will Make You Do" (Marc Broussard featuring Joe Bonamassa)	2023	S.O.S. 4: Blues for Your Soul
"Dear Mr. Fantasy" (Dave Mason featuring Joe Bonamassa)	2023	non-album single
"Have a Talk with God" (Mike Zito featuring Joe Bonamassa)	2024	Life Is Hard
"Nobody's Gonna Know" (Donavon Frankenreiter featuring Joe Bonamassa)	2024	Get Outta Your Mind
"First Time Blues" Orianthi featuring Joe Bonamassa)	2024	non-album single

== Videos ==
=== Video albums ===
List of video albums, with selected chart positions
Title	Album details	Peak chart positions									Certifications
Title	Album details	AUT	BEL (Fla.)	BEL (Wal.)	FIN	GER	NED	SWE	SWI	UK	Certifications
A New Day Yesterday Live	Released: 2002; Label: Medalist; Formats: VHS, DVD	—	—	—	—	—	—	—	—	—	
Live at Rockpalast	Released: February 7, 2006; Label: Premier Artists; Format: DVD	—	—	—	—	—	—	—	—	33	
Live from the Royal Albert Hall	Released: September 22, 2009; Label: J&R Adventures; Formats: 2DVD, BD	—	—	—	—	56	5	—	9	2	BPI: Gold
Beacon Theatre: Live from New York	Released: March 26, 2012; Label: J&R Adventures; Formats: 2DVD, BD	2	6	6	2	21	1	2	3	3	
An Acoustic Evening at the Vienna Opera House	Released: March 12, 2013; Label: J&R Adventures; Formats: 2DVD, BD	1	3	3	3	—	1	2	5	—	
Tour de Force: Live in London – The Borderline	Released: October 28, 2013; Label: J&R Adventures; Formats: 2DVD, BD	—	10	8	—	—	7	8	—	8	
Tour de Force: Live in London – Shepherd's Bush Empire	Released: October 28, 2013; Label: J&R Adventures; Formats: 2DVD, BD	—	—	10	—	—	11	7	—	9	
Tour de Force: Live in London – Hammersmith Apollo	Released: October 28, 2013; Label: J&R Adventures; Formats: 2DVD, BD	—	—	10	—	—	10	6	—	6	
Tour de Force: Live in London – Royal Albert Hall	Released: October 28, 2013; Label: J&R Adventures; Formats: 2DVD, BD	—	9	4	—	—	8	5	—	4	
Tour de Force: Live in London	Released: October 28, 2013; Label: J&R Adventures; Formats: 4DVD, 4BD	2	—	—	—	14	—	—	3	45	
Live in Amsterdam (with Beth Hart)	Released: March 24, 2014; Label: J&R Adventures; Formats: 2DVD, BD	1	2	2	2	—	1	2	3	2	
Muddy Wolf at Red Rocks	Released: March 20, 2015; Label: J&R Adventures; Formats: 2DVD, BD	1	2	3	3	—	1	1	2	1	
Live at the Greek Theatre	Released: September 23, 2016; Label: J&R Adventures; Formats: 2DVD, BD	1	4	1	1	—	2	1	2	—	
Live at Carnegie Hall: An Acoustic Evening	Released: June 23, 2017; Label: J&R Adventures; Formats: 2DVD, BD	1	3	3	—	—	1	3	1	2	
British Blues Explosion Live	Released: May 18, 2018; Label: J&R Adventures; Formats: 2DVD, BD	1	2	1	—	—	1	1	1	1	
Now Serving: Royal Tea Live from the Ryman	Released: June 11, 2021; Label: J&R Adventures; Formats: DVD, BD	1	—	—	—	—	—	—	—	—	
"—" denotes a release that did not chart or was not issued in that region.

=== Music videos ===
List of music videos, showing year released and album name
Title	Year	Album	Ref.
"Miss You, Hate You"	2001	A New Day Yesterday	
"The Ballad of John Henry"	2009	The Ballad of John Henry	
"Driving Towards the Daylight"	2012	Driving Towards the Daylight	
"Dislocated Boy"	2012	Driving Towards the Daylight	
"Different Shades of Blue"	2014	Different Shades of Blue	
"Drive"	2016	Blues of Desperation	
"Mountain Climbing"	2016	Blues of Desperation	
"This Train"	2016	Blues of Desperation	
"Blues of Desperation"	2016	Blues of Desperation	
"Distant Lonesome Train"	2016	Blues of Desperation	
"The Valley Runs Low"	2016	Blues of Desperation	
"You Left Me Nothin' But the Bill and the Blues"	2017	Blues of Desperation	
"How Deep This River Runs"	2017	Blues of Desperation	
"Redemption"	2018	Redemption	
"King Bee Shakedown"	2018	Redemption	
"Molly O"	2018	Redemption	
"A Conversation with Alice"	2020	Royal Tea	
"When One Door Opens"	2020	Royal Tea	
"Cradle Rock"	2020	A New Day Now	
"Colour and Shape"	2020	A New Day Now	
"Why Does It Take So Long to Say Goodbye"	2020	Royal Tea	
"I Didn't Think She Would Do It"	2021	Royal Tea	
"Four Day Creep" (with Peter Frampton)	2024	non-album singles	
"Hold on Loosely" (with Train)	2024	non-album singles	
"Better the Devil You Know"	2024	non-album singles	
"Scarlet Town"	2024	non-album singles	
"Black Irish Eyes"	2024	Blues Deluxe Vol. 2	
"Lonely Christmas Eve"	2024	Lonely Christmas Eve	
"Fortune Teller Blues" (with Sammy Hagar)	2025	non-album single	
"Shake This Ground"	2025	Breakthrough	
"Still Walking with Me"	2025	Breakthrough	
"Breakthrough"	2025	Breakthrough	

== Other appearances ==
List of other appearances, showing year released, other artists and album name
Title	Year	Credited artists	Album	Ref.
"Self-Destructive Blues"	1992	"Smokin" Joe Bonamassa, Jeff Gordon, Dave Wingfield, Jim Fricano, Rob Spagnoletti, Steve Thomas	Strike a Deep Chord: Blues; Guitars for the Homeless	
"Angel"	2000	Joe Lynn Turner	Holy Man	
"Honest Crime"	2000	Joe Lynn Turner	Holy Man	
"Wolves at the Door"	2000	Joe Lynn Turner	Holy Man	
"Dirty Deal"	2003	Joe Lynn Turner	JLT	
"Excess"	2003	Joe Lynn Turner	JLT	
"Jump Start"	2003	Joe Lynn Turner	JLT	
"Blues for Bozo"	2003	Bozo & Pals, Bonamassa	Get Down with the Clown	
"If Heartaches Were Nickels"	2005	Leslie West	Guitarded	
"For What It's Worth"	2005	Ozzy Osbourne	Prince of Darkness	
"Sue's Chicago Blues"	2005	Bonnie Bramlett, Bonamassa	A T-Rex Named Sue	
"Promises"	2005	Jamie Oldaker	Mad Dogs & Okies	
"Clouds on the Horizon"	2006	Walter Trout	Full Circle	
"Mercy Mercy"	2006	Devon Allman's Honeytribe	Torch	
"Deep Water Lullaby"	2007	Jim Suhler & Monkey Beat	Tijuana Bible	
"Love Conquers All"	2008	Joe Bonamassa	20 Dates	
"The Good Luck You're Having"	2008	Les Paul, Bonamassa	Les Paul & Friends: Tribute to a Legend	
"Highway 27"	2009	The Carl Verheyen Band	Trading 8s	
"Give Me One Reason"	2010	Lee Ritenour Bonamassa, Robert Cray	6 String Theory	
"Fine Time"	2010	Healing Sixes, Bonamassa	Blue Jay	
"Going Down" (live)	2010	Pino Daniele, Bonamassa, Robert Randolph and the Family Band	Crossroads Guitar Festival 2010	
"Your Touch"	2010	Marianne Keith	Cathartic	
"Tonight"	2011	Pushking, Glenn Hughes, Bonamassa	The World as We Love It	
"The Easy Blues"	2011	Joe Bonamassa	Johnny Boy Would Love This: A Tribute to John Martyn	
"Third Degree"	2011	Leslie West, Bonamassa	Unusual Suspects	
"I Heard That"	2011	Derek Sherinian	Oceana	
"People in Your Head"	2011	Don Airey	All Out	
"Lotus"	2012	Tommy Bolin, Glenn Hughes, Bonamassa, Nels Cline	Great Gypsy Soul	
"Marching Bag (Movement 3)"	2012	Tommy Bolin, Gordie Johnson, Bonamassa, Nels Cline, Oz Noy, Steve Lukather, Steve Morse	Great Gypsy Soul	
"Marching Bag (Movement 4)"	2012	Tommy Bolin, Brad Whitford, Bonamassa, Nels Cline, Oz Noy, Peter Frampton, Warren Haynes	Great Gypsy Soul	
"Bag of Bones"	2012	Europe	Bag of Bones	
"Lazy"	2012	Jimmy Barnes, Bonamassa	Re-Machined: A Tribute to Deep; Purple's Machine Head	
"Concerto Movement 2: Andante"	2012	Jon Lord	Concerto for Group and Orchestra	
"There in Your Heart"	2012	Beth Hart	Bang Bang Boom Boom	
"Cotton Mouth Man"	2013	James Cotton	Cotton Mouth Man	
"Feels Right"	2013	Mahalia Barnes, Jimmy Barnes, Bonamassa	Welcome to the Pleasure House	
"Lazy"	2013	Jimmy Barnes, Bonamassa	Welcome to the Pleasure House	
"Here to Stay"	2013	John Hiatt	Here to Stay: Best of 2000–2012	
"Simone"	2013	Greg Koch Band	Plays Well with Others	
"I'm Tired"	2014	Tommy Castro and the Painkillers	The Devil You Know	
"Dear Mr. Fantasy"	2014	Dave Mason	Future's Past	
"Shine"	2014	Bernie Marsden	Shine	
"Stone Cold"	2014	Jimmy Barnes, Tina Arena, Bonamassa	30:30 Hindsight	
"Too Much Ain't Enough Love"	2014	Jimmy Barnes, Bonamassa	30:30 Hindsight	
"Broken Love Song"	2015	Frank Viele, Bonamassa	Fall Your Way	
"Bad Child"	2015	Bachman, Bonamassa	Heavy Blues	
"Beggar for the Blues"	2015	Paul Jones	Suddenly I Like It	
"Blues for Joe"	2015	Katja Rieckermann	Never Stand Still	
"Buckaroo"	2015	Katja Rieckermann	Never Stand Still	
"Train"	2016	Ana Popović, Bonamassa	Trilogy	
"In a Broken Dream"	2016	Jimmy Barnes, Bonamassa	Soul Searchin'	
"Me, Myself and I"	2016	Bobby Rush, Bonamassa	Porcupine Meat	
"Over Your Head"	2016	Josh Smith	Over Your Head	
"Five Spot Blues"	2016	Oz Noy, Bonamassa	Who Gives a Funk	
"Black and Blue"	2023	Jimmy Barnes, Bonamassa	Mushroom: Fifty Years of Making Noise (Reimagined)	
"Moaning Lisa"	2024	Andy Wood, Bonamassa	Charisma	

== See also ==
- Bloodline (band)
- Black Country Communion discography
- Rock Candy Funk Party
