= List of UK Jazz & Blues Albums Chart number ones of 2012 =

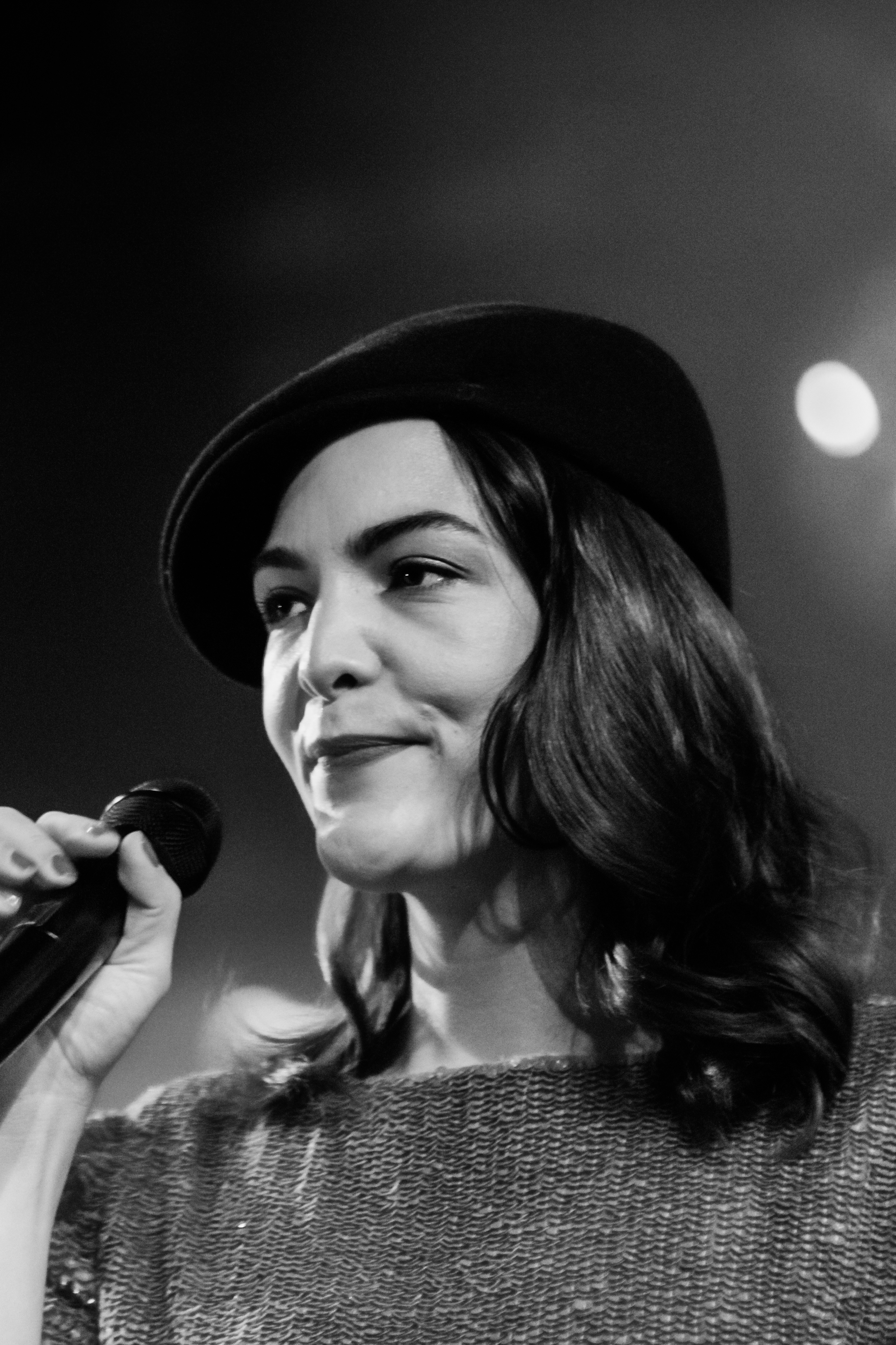
Caro Emerald's debut album Deleted Scenes from the Cutting Room Floor spent a total of 13 weeks at number one on the UK Jazz & Blues Albums Chart in 2012 over four separate spells.

The UK Jazz & Blues Albums Chart is a record chart which ranks the best-selling jazz and blues albums in the United Kingdom. Compiled and published by the Official Charts Company, the data is based on each album's weekly physical sales, digital downloads and streams. In 2012, 53 charts were published with 17 albums at number one. The first number-one album of the year was Caro Emerald's debut album Deleted Scenes from the Cutting Room Floor, which continued its run atop the chart from the previous year for the first five weeks of 2012. The last number-one album of the year was The Golden Age of Song by Jools Holland, which spent two weeks in December in the top spot.

The most successful album on the UK Jazz & Blues Albums Chart in 2012 was Deleted Scenes from the Cutting Room Floor, which spent a total of 13 weeks at number one over four separate spells, the longest of which was six weeks. Joe Bonamassa's tenth studio album Driving Towards the Daylight spent 12 weeks at number one, including the year's longest run of 11 weeks atop the chart. Michael Bublé Sings Totally Blond by Michael Bublé spent eight weeks at number one from October onwards, while At Last: The Best of Etta James was number one for four consecutive weeks. Michael Bublé Sings Totally Blond finished 2012 as the 60th best-selling album of the year in the UK.

== Chart history ==
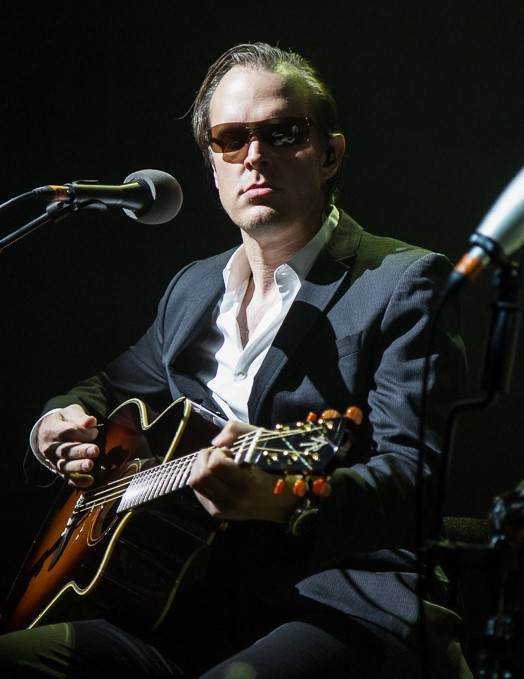
Joe Bonamassa spent 12 weeks at number one in 2012 with his tenth studio album, Driving Towards the Daylight.

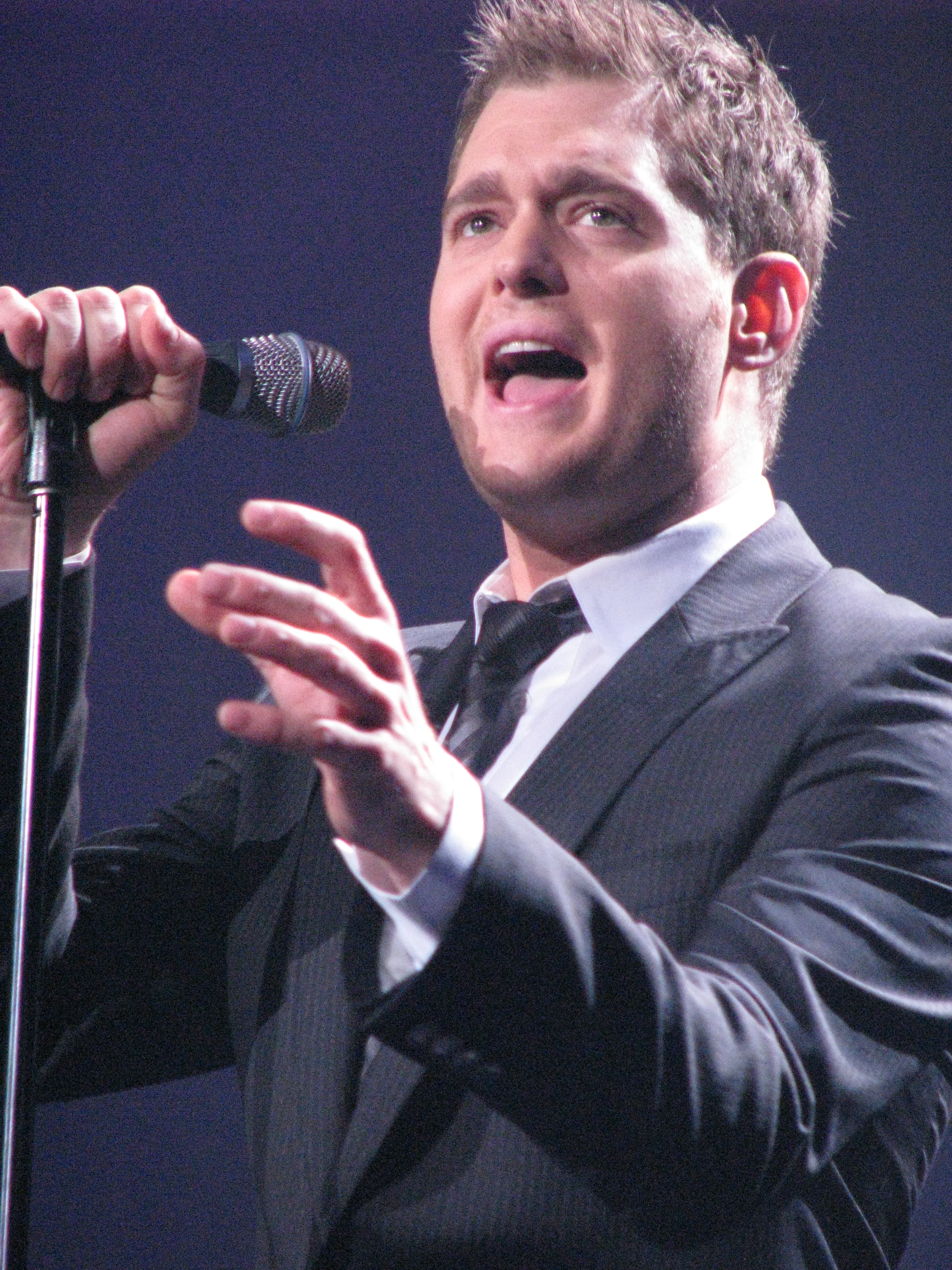
Michael Bublé spent eight weeks at number one with Michael Bublé Sings Totally Blond, which finished the year as the best-selling jazz/blues album of 2012.

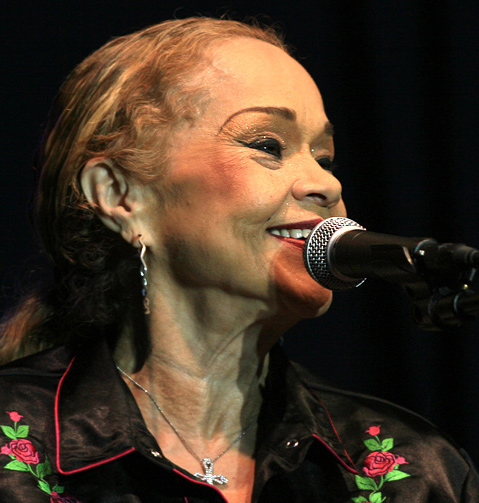
Following her death the previous month, Etta James spent four weeks at number one in February 2012 with At Last: The Best of Etta James.

Key
†	Indicates best-selling jazz/blues album of 2012

Issue date	Album	Artist(s)	Record label(s)	Ref.
1 January	Deleted Scenes from the Cutting Room Floor	Caro Emerald	Dramatico	
8 January	Deleted Scenes from the Cutting Room Floor	Caro Emerald	Dramatico	
15 January	Deleted Scenes from the Cutting Room Floor	Caro Emerald	Dramatico	
22 January	Deleted Scenes from the Cutting Room Floor	Caro Emerald	Dramatico	
29 January	Deleted Scenes from the Cutting Room Floor	Caro Emerald	Dramatico	
5 February	The Best of Louis Armstrong	Louis Armstrong	Decca	
12 February	At Last: The Best of Etta James	Etta James	Decca	
19 February	At Last: The Best of Etta James	Etta James	Decca	
26 February	At Last: The Best of Etta James	Etta James	Decca	
4 March	At Last: The Best of Etta James	Etta James	Decca	
11 March	The Very Best of Nina Simone	Nina Simone	RCA/UCJ	
18 March	Deleted Scenes from the Cutting Room Floor	Caro Emerald	Dramatico	
25 March	Deleted Scenes from the Cutting Room Floor	Caro Emerald	Dramatico	
1 April	Deleted Scenes from the Cutting Room Floor	Caro Emerald	Dramatico	
8 April	Deleted Scenes from the Cutting Room Floor	Caro Emerald	Dramatico	
15 April	Deleted Scenes from the Cutting Room Floor	Caro Emerald	Dramatico	
22 April	Deleted Scenes from the Cutting Room Floor	Caro Emerald	Dramatico	
29 April	Blues for the Modern Daze	Walter Trout	Provogue	
6 May	Deleted Scenes from the Cutting Room Floor	Caro Emerald	Dramatico	
13 May	The Best of Peter Green's Fleetwood Mac	Fleetwood Mac	Columbia	
20 May	Deleted Scenes from the Cutting Room Floor	Caro Emerald	Dramatico	
27 May	Driving Towards the Daylight	Joe Bonamassa	Provogue	
3 June	The Absence	Melody Gardot	Decca	
10 June	Driving Towards the Daylight	Joe Bonamassa	Provogue	
17 June	Driving Towards the Daylight	Joe Bonamassa	Provogue	
24 June	Driving Towards the Daylight	Joe Bonamassa	Provogue	
1 July	Driving Towards the Daylight	Joe Bonamassa	Provogue	
8 July	Driving Towards the Daylight	Joe Bonamassa	Provogue	
15 July	Driving Towards the Daylight	Joe Bonamassa	Provogue	
22 July	Driving Towards the Daylight	Joe Bonamassa	Provogue	
29 July	Driving Towards the Daylight	Joe Bonamassa	Provogue	
5 August	Driving Towards the Daylight	Joe Bonamassa	Provogue	
12 August	Driving Towards the Daylight	Joe Bonamassa	Provogue	
19 August	Driving Towards the Daylight	Joe Bonamassa	Provogue	
26 August	The Best of Etta James	Etta James	Spectrum	
2 September	Nothin but Love	Robert Cray	Provogue	
9 September	Greatest Hits	Janis Joplin	Columbia	
16 September	The Best of Etta James	Etta James	Spectrum	
23 September	Almost Always Never	Joanne Shaw Taylor	Ruf	
30 September	Beacon Theatre: Live from New York	Joe Bonamassa	Provogue	
7 October	Nothin but Love	Robert Cray	Provogue	
14 October	Legacy	Gary Moore	Music Club Deluxe	
21 October	Glad Rag Doll	Diana Krall	Verve	
28 October	Michael Bublé Sings Totally Blond †	Michael Bublé	Metro	
4 November	Michael Bublé Sings Totally Blond †	Michael Bublé	Metro	
11 November	Michael Bublé Sings Totally Blond †	Michael Bublé	Metro	
18 November	Michael Bublé Sings Totally Blond †	Michael Bublé	Metro	
25 November	Michael Bublé Sings Totally Blond †	Michael Bublé	Metro	
2 December	Michael Bublé Sings Totally Blond †	Michael Bublé	Metro	
9 December	The Golden Age of Song	Jools Holland	Rhino	
16 December	Michael Bublé Sings Totally Blond †	Michael Bublé	Metro	
23 December	Michael Bublé Sings Totally Blond †	Michael Bublé	Metro	
30 December	The Golden Age of Song	Jools Holland	Rhino	

== See also ==
- 2012 in British music
