= Jim Evans (artist) =

American painter

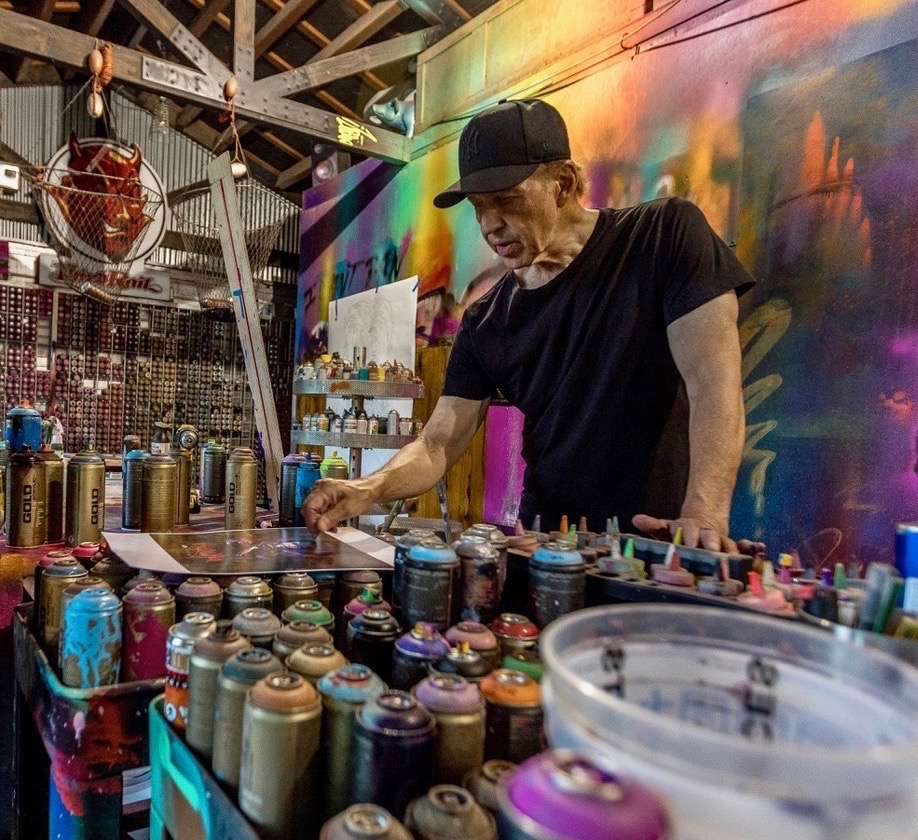
- Jim Evans in painting studio
- Born: Jim Evans; San Diego, California U.S.
- Education: Art Center College of Design, Chouinard Art Institute
- Known for: Painting, Cinema, Graphic design, Illustrator, Web design, Poster, Comics, Surf Art
- Movement: Poster art, Underground Comics,
- Spouse: Nancy Lucas Evans
- Children: 4

Jim Evans, sometimes known as TAZ, is an American painter, printmaker, and creative director who was a contributing figure in the visual art movement known as underground comix. After success as an illustrator of Underground Comix, Evans became known for his Album Cover and Film Poster art and hundreds of Rock Music posters, in addition to being owner of the Digital Marketing group, Division 13.

== Biography ==
=== Early life ===
Evans was born in San Diego amidst the surfing culture of southern California. After attending Oceanside High School, he played in several local bands and then created comic strips for the Los Angeles Free Press and other underground papers while working for Eric Matlen's Sawyer Press. Evans then began to take commissions doing work in several comic books. These included Yellow Dog, and a solo effort titled The Dying Dolphin, released by the Berkeley-based Print Mint, it included collaborations with Rick Griffin and Ron Cobb. Evans also drew for Slow Death Funnies, and Tales from the Tube, which was published by Surfer Magazine, and included contributions by Zap Comix artists Robert Crumb, Spain Rodriguez, Robert Williams, and Rick Griffin.

Evans served in the United States Naval Reserves, learned to play the sitar at Ravi Shankar's Kinnara School of Music, and studied Kundalini Yoga as an early student of Yogi Bhajan, while attending Chouinard Art Institute.

=== Hawaii ===
The Underground period was followed by a move to the North Shore of Oahu, and contributions to both Surfer and Surfing magazines, as well as illustrating a succession of surfing posters, such as Hal Jepson's "A Sea For Yourself", and the posters for Bud Browne's successful "Going Surfin'" series. He did posters for many Australian surf films like On Any Morning, and A Winter's Tale. During this period, he also did posters for Oahu's Crater Celebration, featuring bands like Santana and Little Feat. Some of the time in Hawaii was spent doing commercial and advertising art for ad agencies, including ads and record sleeves for Don Ho and the Allihis, and The Society of Seven as well as doing promotion for the Honolulu leg of The Rolling Stones Pacific Tour 1973.

=== Album art and record covers ===
Returning to the mainland, Evans began to do record sleeves and continued his relationship with Surfer and Surfing magazines, doing numerous illustrations for both, including a collaboration with surfer Mike Doyle on a series of ads for Wax Research. Evans also contributed regularly to Skateboarder and Powder magazines. Working with Dean Torrence of Jan & Dean fame, Evans also did the art for the Beach Boys' albums 15 Big Ones, and Live in London. This, in turn, led to the commission to create a logo for the band Chicago. His list of album jackets includes; Alice Coltrane, The Robby Kreiger Band, Chicago / Hot Streets, The Allman Brothers, Neil Young, The Beach Boys, Beastie Boys, Beck, House of Pain, Symbol Six, Face To Face, and Toto.

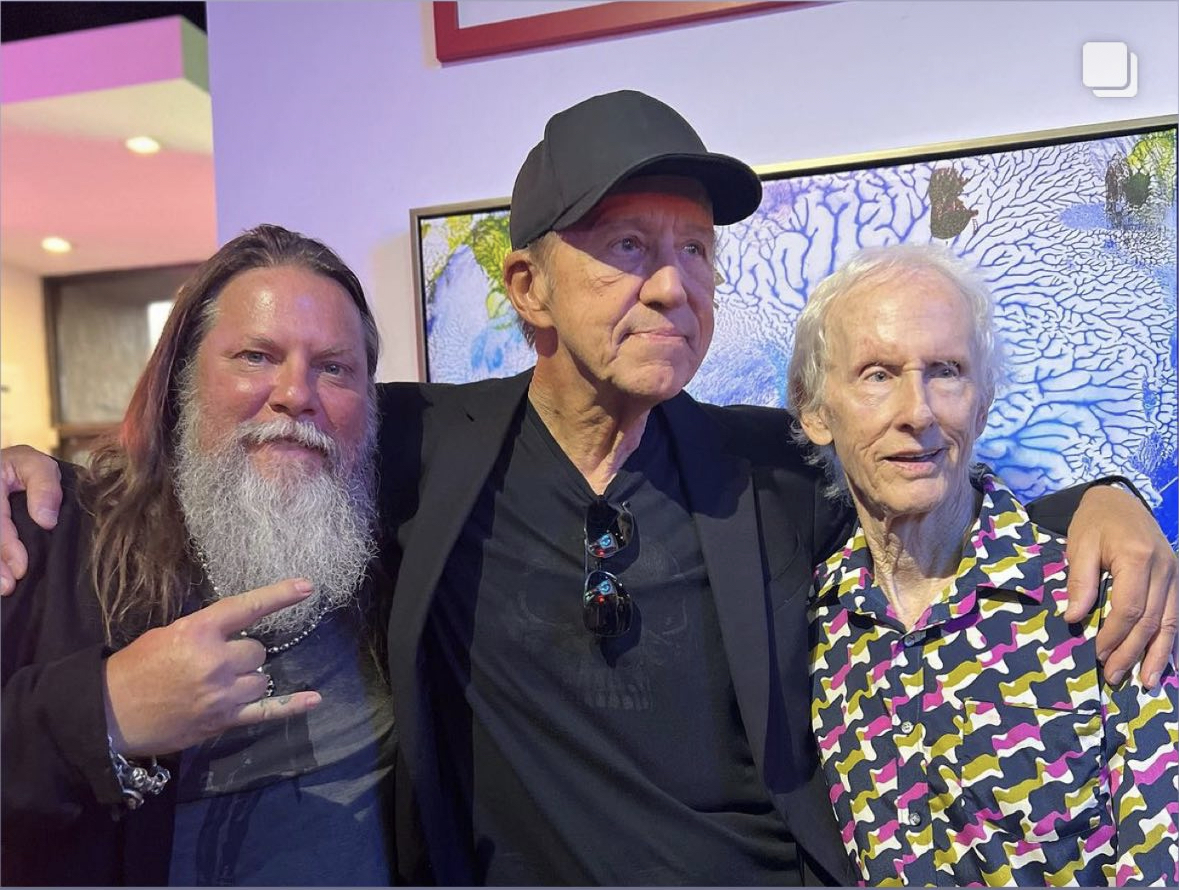
Risk, Jim Evans, Robby Krieger

In addition to the record sleeves and ongoing work with the surfing magazines, Evans became a contributor to the newly formed Skateboarder magazine, handling all of the illustration work for the first four issues. Jim also collaborated with Frank Nasworthy on a series of ads for Cadillac Wheels, the first polyurethane skateboard wheel. The posters, with titles like, "From Out of the West" and "Accept No Substitutes" came to represent the paradigm shift taking place in skateboarding. Other skate art commissions included one for filmmaker / skater Stacy Peralta, for an early skate film titled Freestylin', as well as the poster for the first California Free Former World Professional Skateboard Championships, that was featured in the film Lords of Dogtown.

Evans worked with producer Kevin Shirley to do the album art and packaging design for Joe Bonamassa's Live at the Greek Theater and British Blues Explosion Live.

=== Film posters ===
The period of record sleeves and skate posters ran parallel to commissions for a number of film posters. Working for most of the major studios, Jim completed art for Lumière, 20th Century Oz, I Never Promised You a Rose Garden, The Kentucky Fried Movie, Big Wednesday, Herowork, Acapulco Gold, The Space Movie, Patrick, Neil Young's Rust Never Sleeps (for which Jim also animated the opening title sequence), and John Carpenter's first film Dark Star. Numerous books began to appear at this time and his work is included in the History of Rock Art, Phonographics, Roger Dean's Album Art Book, and The History of Underground Comics. An interest in film led to work as an art director, set decorator, and storyboard artist for films. Evans worked on Strangers Kiss and Growing Pains. He also helped to prepare an American release for a series of Japanese films called The Baby Cart Series. Working with director Robert Houston and his partner David Weisman, Jim created the poster and title treatment for the 1980 release titled Shogun Assassin, Jim's son Gibran Evans voiced the narrative as Daigoro. An ongoing creative collaboration with John Hegeman, president of Orion Pictures, led to Jim illustrating promotional posters for the Saw films for Lionsgate, The Green Inferno for BH Tilt, the film Mirrors for New Regency, Anna and the Apocalypse and a poster-centric street art image for Child's Play.

In addition, Evans collaborated with Lionsgate marketing director Tim Palen on the key art for American Ultra. For Quentin Tarantino's Once Upon a Time In...Hollywood, Evans was commissioned to do a series of posters featuring, Brad Pitt, Leonardo DiCaprio, and Margot Robbie. Sony Pictures also tapped Evans to do posters for Zombieland: Double Tap, and Jumanji: Next Level. Warner Bros. had Evans to a series of 4 posters for the release of Godzilla x Kong that were used worldwide. A poster for Sydney Sweeney’s film Christy was done for Black Bear Pictures. A long time relationship with director Gore Verbinski, who Evans collaborated with on DreamWorks The Ring, led to a commission for a poster and street art for, Good Luck, Have Fun, Don’t Die.

=== Fine art ===
An association with Playboy led to a series of silkscreen portraits of celebrities. The magazine commissioned Evans to do portraits of Sean Connery, David Letterman, Joe Montana, and Marilyn Monroe. These portraits led to art shows in Chicago and New York, in addition to a large scale show at the Hansen Gallery Rodeo Drive location, where he did portraits of Sylvester Stallone, Madonna, Arnold Schwarzenegger, Billy Idol, Steve Vai, Bob Dylan, and Robert Mitchum. Later a show of feminist icons, done in collaboration with pop artist Richard Duardo, had a successful run at the Zero One gallery in Los Angeles. Evans' art has been shown at The Nyehaus gallery, Metro Pictures and Friedrich Petzel Gallery in New York, for a bi-coastal tour called "Swell". Other artists in the show included Billy Al Bengston, Ed Ruscha, Laddie John Dill, and Dennis Hopper.

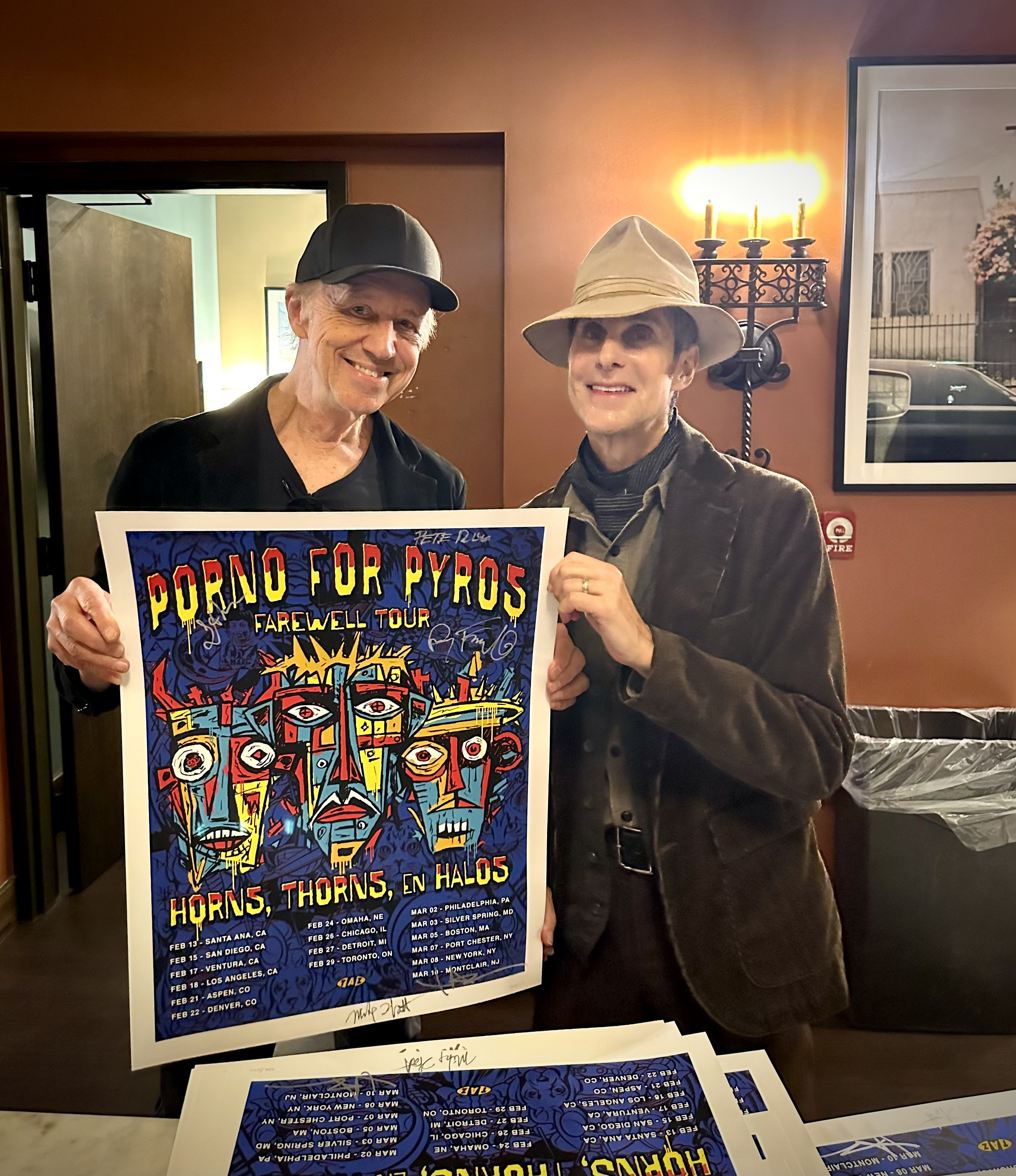
Jim Evans and Perry Farrell of Porno for Pyros

Evans' work was included in a group show titled "The Lords and the New Creatures" at the NYE+BROWN gallery, which also featured Judy Chicago, Ed Moses, and Chris Burden. In addition, work from Evans's comic and illustration period were included in the "Paid To Play" show at the Robert Berman Gallery, which also featured John Van Hamersveld and Dave Willardson. Both of these shows were part of the Los Angeles-based Pacific Standard Time: Art In L.A. 1945–1980 initiative.

A group show at WAAS Gallery in Dallas titled, "Collect / Respect" featured Evans' work in addition to Sebastian Walker, Restoration Press, Gregory Siff, and SLICK.

A collaboration with artist Ned Evans led to the creation of the TAZBONES team, and a two-man show at the ICON Gallery in Los Angeles. It featured a series of fantasy surf-posters and was called "The No Shows 1972–1999." This collaboration was later included in a show at the Harwood Museum Of Art in Taos, NM titled, "¡Orale! Kings and Queens of Cool." This show also included the work of Gary Baseman, and Joe Coleman.

In 2014 a one-man show celebrating Evans' early work was mounted by the Palm Springs Modernism Week in conjunction with Gallery 446 and Eddie Donaldson, it was titled, "MODERNISM: The Art Of The Pop Portrait – Jim Evans 1984–1986." This period of work was also showcased at the Level Gallery in Dallas, TX in a show titled, "The Art Of The Pop Portrait – Jim Evans 1984–1989."

Jim Evans / TAZ presented solo works as well as collaborations with RISK (Graffiti Artist) at the Buckshot Gallery in Santa Monica, CA in a show titled, "Unconventional Forces." Jim Evans / TAZ followed up by working with RISK and photographer Dennis Morris on a pair of limited-edition prints celebrating The Sex Pistols and Peter Tosh.

In 2023 Evans headlined a rock art show at the Compound Contemporary Gallery in Thousand Oaks, CA titled, “Beyond the Stage” featuring Jim, Robby Kreiger, Bernie Taupin, Ronnie Wood, Billy Morrison, Dave Navarro, Shepard Fairey, and Risk.

A 2025 solo retrospective at the Malibu City Gallery, was hosted by the Malibu Arts Commission. It featured work from the last 50 years, including posters for Neil Young’s Rust Never Sleeps, Once Upon aTime In...Hollywood, and Godzilla x Kong. Rock posters for Blink 182, Pearl Jam, Beastie Boys, and Foo Fighters, along with selected fine art collaborations with graffiti artist RISK.

=== TAZ rock posters ===
In the late 1980s, Evans turned his attention back to rock music. Agreeing to do a poster for Nirvana and L7 for a Rock for Choice benefit, he created a new moniker, TAZ The name was inspired by Hakim Bey's anarchist handbook titled The Temporary Autonomous Zone, This began collaboration with Jim, Gibran Evans, and silkscreen artist Rolo Castillo. During the 90's they created over 200 silkscreen limited edition rock posters for bands such as U2, Jane's Addiction, Oasis, Pearl Jam, Smashing Pumpkins, Metallica, and the Beastie Boys. As a group, TAZ has completed commissions for numerous record sleeves. These include the Beastie Boys, Beck, Aerosmith, Face to Face, House of Pain, The Voodoo Glow Skulls, Slayer, Luscious Jackson, and Orange 9mm. The creation of TAZ led to Jim's association with the Lollapalooza festival, and the Tibetan Freedom Concerts. In 1994, he was commissioned by Marc Geiger and Perry Farrell to decorate the Lollapalooza festival.^{.} The TAZ collective branched out into film posters with the 10th Anniversary poster for the Saw franchise, American Ultra, a series for Eli Roth's Green Inferno, and a Teenage Mutant Ninja Turtles Limited Edition. TAZ as a group also continues to do rock posters, commissions include, Pearl Jam, Foo Fighters, Blink-182, Queens Of The Stone Age, Bad Religion, and Anderson .Paak. A recent issue of CAMP, the Coachella magazine featured an interview with Evans and poster artist Emek. Flood Magazine commissioned TAZ to do a cover and interior illustration for activist rapper M.I.A. to coincide with the release of her documentary Matangi/Maya/M.I.A. Other TAZ collaborators include, Ariel Celestino, Kirk Canning, and Omaha Perez.

=== Digital media ===
The move into electronic media led to the founding of The Big Gun Project. The Big Gun Project was conceived as a loosely organized artistic electronic commune made up of artists, designers, writers, and computer programmers. The Big Gun Project was responsible for creating early websites such as The Crash Site, FilmZone, and Salvo. The Big Gun Project's work-for-hire initiatives led to the completion of many web sites for major motion pictures. Among them, Men in Black, Tomorrow Never Dies, Seven, Jackie Chan's Rumble in the Bronx, The Mummy, The Big Lebowski, and Fear and Loathing in Las Vegas, which was done in collaboration with film director Terry Gilliam. On the music side, the Big Gun Project built websites for The Beastie Boys, The Ozzfest, Grand Royal Records, and the Tibetan Freedom Concert.

In the late 1990s, Evans worked as the Executive Creative Director for Al Teller's online label Atomic Pop. He was in charge of interface design, content creation, website development for artists signed to the label, and interactive game design. While at Atomic Pop, he created sites, videos, and games, for Public Enemy, Ice-T, The Black Eyed Peas, and Smashing Pumpkins.

=== Current ===
Evans resides in Malibu with his wife and business partner Nancy Lucas Evans. He is the Executive Creative Director and owner of the Division 13 Design Group, a web-based design firm specializing in the collaboration of art and technology. With clients like Sony Pictures, DreamWorks Animation, Lionsgate, Orion Pictures, Universal, Paramount, and Warner Bros, he does websites, marketing campaigns, games, apps, videos, animations, and poster art for films. Titles he has worked on include Kung Fu Panda, Madagascar, How to Train Your Dragon, Shrek, Ice Age, the SAW series, The Ring, Star Trek Beyond, Angry Birds, Don't Breathe, and Teenage Mutant Ninja Turtles: Out of the Shadows.

== Works ==
=== Film Projects ===
- Jumanji: The Next Level
- Zombieland: Double Tap
- Once Upon a Time in Hollywood
- Men in Black: International
- Rocketman
- The Lego Movie 2: The Second Part
- Teen Titans Go! To the Movies
- Venom
- Mission: Impossible – Fallout
- The Emoji Movie
- Star Trek Beyond
- The Angry Birds Movie
- Don't Breathe
- Trolls
- Home
- The Darkness
- The Green Inferno
- American Ultra
- Freeheld
- The Hunger Games: Mockingjay – Part 1
- Paddington
- Fury
- Penguins of Madagascar
- Mr. Peabody & Sherman
- Turbo
- The Nut Job
- Puss in Boots
- Real Steel
- In Time
- The Croods
- Shrek Forever After
- Ice Age: Dawn of the Dinosaurs
- Monsters vs. Aliens
- Kung Fu Panda I, II
- Saw, Saw III, Saw V, Saw 3D
- Hellboy I, II
- Mirrors
- DreamWorks Animation
- Shrek the Third
- Dreamgirls
- Madagascar I, III
- Lord of War
- Over the Hedge
- Flags of Our Fathers
- The Terminal
- Catch Me If You Can
- Shark Tale
- XXX: State of the Union
- The Ring 1, 2
- The League of Extraordinary Gentlemen
- Fear and Loathing in Las Vegas
- The Big Lebowski
- Men in Black
- Psycho
- Seven

=== Film posters ===
- Good Luck, Have Fun, Don't Die
- Christy
- Godzilla x Kong: The New Empire
- Jumanji: The Next Level
- Zombieland: Double Tap
- Once Upon a Time in Hollywood
- Jigsaw (IMAX)
- American Ultra (Comic-Con Exclusive)
- Saw (10th Anniversary Edition)
- Tank Girl
- The Kentucky Fried Movie
- Big Wednesday
- Mustang Ranch
- Dark Star
- Rust Never Sleeps
- Shogun Assassin
- Acapulco Gold
- 20th Century Oz
- The Space Movie
- I Never Promised You a Rose Garden
- Lumière
- Herowork

=== Music posters ===
- Anderson .Paak
- Blink-182
- Band of Horses
- Queens of the Stone Age
- House of Pain
- Nirvana
- Beck
- Melvins
- Rage Against the Machine
- The Smashing Pumpkins
- Green Day
- Lollapalooza
- Foo Fighters
- U2
- Tibetan Freedom Concert
- Nine Inch Nails
- Pearl Jam
- Metallica
- Ramones
- Sonic Youth
- Jane's Addiction
- Beastie Boys
- Wu-Tang Clan
- L7
- Bad Religion
- Oasis
- Bob Dylan
- 311

=== Album art ===
- Live at the Greek Theater, Joe Bonamassa
- Live Rust – Neil Young,
- Ill Communication – Beastie Boys
- 15 Big Ones – The Beach Boys
- Wipe the Windows, Check the Oil, Dollar Gas – The Allman Brothers
- Live In London – The Beach Boys
- Robbie Krieger & Friends – Robby Krieger
- Big Choice – Face to Face
- Truth Crushed To Earth Shall Rise Again – House of Pain
- Who Is, This Is – Voodoo Glow Skulls
- Driver Not Included – Orange 9mm
- Falling In Between – Toto
- Stereopathetic Soulmanure – Beck
- Ptah, the El Daoud – Alice Coltrane
