= Redemption (Joe Bonamassa album) =

Studio album by Joe Bonamassa
- Released: September 21, 2018
- Studios: Blackbird (Nashville); The Cave Australia (Sydney); Studio at the Palms (Las Vegas); Hit Factory Criteria (Miami); Addiction Sound (Nashville)
- Genre: Blues rock
- Length: 69:11
- Label: Provogue - Mascot Music Productions
- Producers: Kevin Shirley, Roy Weisman (executive producer)

Joe Bonamassa chronology
Blues of Desperation (2016)	Redemption (2018)	Royal Tea (2020)

Redemption is the thirteenth studio album by American blues rock guitarist Joe Bonamassa. It was released on September 21, 2018 through Provogue / Mascot Music Productions.

== Reception ==
Redemption holds a Metacritic score of 69 out of 100 based on 4 critics, indicating generally favorable reviews.

The album ranked No. 26 on the US Billboard 200, No. 2 on Top Rock Albums, and No. 1 on the Blues Albums chart.

The album has also been released with extended artwork in a 56 page hardcover digibook.

== Track listing ==
No.	Title	Length
1.	"Evil Mama"	5:29
2.	"King Bee Shakedown"	4:22
3.	"Molly O'"	6:06
4.	"Deep in the Blues Again"	4:45
5.	"Self-Inflicted Wounds"	6:35
6.	"Pick Up the Pieces"	3:55
7.	"The Ghost of Macon Jones"	5:24
8.	"Just 'Cos You Can Don't Mean You Should"	6:40
9.	"Redemption"	5:57
10.	"I've Got Some Mind Over What Matters"	5:50
11.	"Stronger Now in Broken Places"	4:33
12.	"Love Is a Gamble"	5:13
Total length:		69:11

Target exclusive bonus tracks
No.	Title	Length
13.	"Black Roses"
14.	"Stronger Now in Broken Places" (band version)
15.	"Somewhere Down the Road"

== Personnel ==
=== Musicians ===
- Joe Bonamassa – guitar, vocals
- Reese Wynans – organ, piano
- Anton Fig – drums, percussion
- Michael Rhodes – bass guitar
- Lee Thornburg – horn
- Paulie Cerra – horn
- Kenny Greenberg – guitar
- Doug Lancio – guitar
- Gary Pinto – harmony vocals
- Mahalia Barnes – background vocals
- Jade MacRae – background vocals
- Juanita Tippins – background vocals
- Jamey Johnson – background vocals

== Charts ==
Chart (2018)	Peak position
Austrian Albums (Ö3 Austria)	3
Belgian Albums (Ultratop Flanders)	10
Belgian Albums (Ultratop Wallonia)	21
Dutch Albums (Album Top 100)	9
Finnish Albums (Suomen virallinen lista)	20
French Albums (SNEP)	55
German Albums (Offizielle Top 100)	3
Hungarian Albums (MAHASZ)	19
Italian Albums (FIMI)	28
Norwegian Albums (VG-lista)	11
Spanish Albums (Promusicae)	78
Swedish Albums (Sverigetopplistan)	16
Swiss Albums (Schweizer Hitparade)	2
UK Albums (Official Charts)	7
US Billboard 200	26

== Certifications ==
Region	Certification	Certified units/sales
Poland (ZPAV)	Gold	10,000^{‡}
^{‡} Sales+streaming figures based on certification alone.
