= Live at the Greek Theatre (Joe Bonamassa album) =

Live album by Joe Bonamassa
- Released: September 23, 2016
- Recorded: August 29, 2015
- Genre: Blues rock
- Length: 118:59
- Label: Provogue Records; J&R Records/Fontana
- Producer: Kevin Shirley

Joe Bonamassa chronology
Blues of Desperation (2016)	Live at the Greek Theatre (2016)	Live at Carnegie Hall: An Acoustic Evening (2017)

Live at the Greek Theatre is the fourteenth live album by American blues rock musician Joe Bonamassa. The album was recorded on August 29, 2015, at the Greek Theatre in Los Angeles and released by J&R Adventures on Blu-ray, DVD, and CD on September 23, 2016.

This album is a tribute to the "three Kings" : Freddie King (songs 1 to 6 of CD 1 and 8 of CD 2), Albert King (songs 7 to 11 of CD 1 and 1 and 9 of CD 2) and especially B.B. King (songs 1 to 7 and 10 and 11 of CD 2), who was a mentor for young Bonamassa.

The Live at the Greek Theater album art was done by rock artist Jim Evans, also known as TAZ, who collaborated with producer Kevin Shirley. It peaked at number one on the Billboard Top Blues Albums.

== Track listing ==
Disc one

No.	Title	Writer(s)	Length
1.	"See See Baby"	Freddie King, Sonny Thompson	3:17
2.	"Some Other Day, Some Other Time"	Freddie King, Sonny Thompson	4:01
3.	"Lonesome Whistle Blues"	Alan Moore, Elson Teat, Rudy Toombs	4:21
4.	"Sittin' On The Boat Dock"	Freddie King, Sonny Thompson	4:12
5.	"You've Got to Love Her with a Feeling"	Tampa Red a.k.a. Hudson Whittaker	5:32
6.	"Going Down"	Don Nix	6:13
7.	"I'll Play The Blues For You"	Jerry Beach	6:56
8.	"I Get Evil"	Tampa Red	4:17
9.	"Breaking Up Somebody's Home"	Al Jackson Jr. Timothy Matthews	8:14
10.	"Angel of Mercy"	Homer Banks, Raymond Jackson	6:42
11.	"Cadillac Assembly Line"	Albert King	6:49

Disc two

No.	Title	Writer(s)	Length
1.	"Oh, Pretty Woman"	Albert King	6:06
2.	"Let The Good Times Roll"	Louis Jordan	5:44
3.	"Never Make Your Move Too Soon"	Stix Hooper, Will Jennings	7:16
4.	"Ole Time Religion"	B.B. King	5:06
5.	"Nobody Loves Me But My Mother"	B.B. King	7:41
6.	"Boogie Woogie Woman"	B.B. King, Jules Taub	3:39
7.	"Hummingbird"	Leon Russell	10:58
8.	"Hide Away"	Freddie King	2:29
9.	"Born Under A Bad Sign"	Booker T. Jones, William Bell	5:04
10.	"The Thrill Is Gone"	Rick Darnell, Roy Hawkins	6:53
11.	"Riding with the King"	John Hiatt	4:31

== Personnel ==
=== Musicians ===
- Joe Bonamassa – guitar, vocals
- Anton Fig – percussion
- Reese Wynans – keyboards
- Michael Rhodes – bass
- Kirk Fletcher – guitar
- Lee Thornburg – Trumpet
- Paulie Cerra & Ron Dziubla – saxophone
- Mahalia Barnes, Jade MacRae & Juanita Tippins – background vocals

== Critical reception ==
Professional ratings
Review scores
Source	Rating
Renowned for Sound	4/5 stars

While Christopher Bohlsen praised the performance in Live at the Greek Theatre, Bohlsen noted that the two-hour duration of the album would not please everyone. Similarly, Mark Deming of AllMusic said Joe Bonamassa showcased what he learnt from his musical influences.

== Accolades ==
Live at the Greek Theatre was nominated for Best Traditional Blues Album at the 59th Annual Grammy Awards in 2017.

== Chart performance ==
Chart (2016)	Peak position
Hungarian Albums (MAHASZ)	18
US Top Blues Albums (Billboard)	1
