= Marianne Keith =

American singer-songwriter

Marianne Keith (born July 29, 1985) is an American singer-songwriter from Redlands, California, United States. As a solo artist, she has recorded three full-length albums: Make No Mistake (self-released), Beautiful Distraction (2007, Unison Music) and Cathartic (2010, Unison Music Group).

Marianne Keith won “Best Folk Artist” in the 2008 Orange County Register Music Awards. She was previously nominated in the 2006 awards as Best Country Artist, as well as the Hollywood Music in Media Awards 2009 Best Adult Contemporary/AAA Artist 2009. She was featured as KGRL.fm's "Flower Power Artist" in November 2007.

She has performed with Better Than Ezra, Glenn Tilbrook and Joe Bonamassa.
