= Blues Deluxe Vol. 2 =

Studio album by Joe Bonamassa
- Released: October 6, 2023
- Studio: Sunset Sound Studio B; Ocean Way Nashville
- Genre: Blues rock
- Length: 42:33
- Label: J&R Adventures; Provogue
- Producer: Josh Smith

Joe Bonamassa chronology
| Time Clocks (2021) | Blues Deluxe Vol. 2 (2023) | Breakthrough (2025) |

Blues Deluxe Vol. 2 is the sixteenth solo studio album by American blues rock musician Joe Bonamassa, released through J&R Adventures in North America and Provogue in Europe on October 6, 2023. "I Want to Shout About It", "Twenty-Four Hour Blues", "Well, I Done Got Over It", "Lazy Poker Blues" and "Hope You Realize It (Goodbye Again)" were released as singles prior to the album. It serves as a successor to the original Blues Deluxe, released 20 years earlier.

== Background ==
The album serves as a continuation of his 2003 studio album Blues Deluxe. Produced alongside Josh Smith, Bonamassa wanted to see how much he progressed as a musician in the span of 20 years. Smith revealed that he immediately knew what he wanted to accomplish, which was for fans to hear a "completely natural, relaxed Joe". He described him as "in the moment and feeling completely supported". The album includes two original songs as well as eight cover versions of Bobby Bland, Fleetwood Mac and Albert King.

== Critical reception ==
Professional ratings
Aggregate scores
| Source | Rating |
|---|---|
| Metacritic | 71/100 |
Review scores
| Source | Rating |
| AllMusic | 4/5 stars |
| American Songwriter | 3.5/5 stars |
| Mojo | 3/5 stars |
| Uncut | 6/10 |

Blues Deluxe Vol. 2 received a score of 71 out of 100 on review aggregator Metacritic based on five critics' reviews, indicating "generally favorable" reception. Hal Horowitz of American Songwriter wrote that Bonamassa "clearly loves these songs, delivering them with class and fire. Guitar solos are kept in check, stabbing through without the excessive flash he has been criticized for". Uncut described the album as "faithful and reverential throughout" with "clear signs of Joe's own personality shining though", and Mojo found the songs to be "all done pretty straight, but then of course he throws in his trademark 'more is more' soloing, all Bluesbreakers-to-Cream-era Eric Clapton-style muscle and intensity".

== Track listing ==
Blues Deluxe Vol. 2 track listing
| No. | Title | Writer(s) | Original artist | Length |
|---|---|---|---|---|
| 1. | "Twenty-Four Hour Blues" | Steve Barri; Harvey Price; Dan Walsh | Bobby Bland | 4:32 |
| 2. | "It's Hard But It's Fair" | Robert Parker | Bobby Parker | 3:15 |
| 3. | "Well, I Done Got Over It" | Eddie Jones | Guitar Slim | 2:54 |
| 4. | "I Want to Shout About It" | Steve Gomes; Ronald Horvath | Ronnie Earl and the Broadcasters | 4:12 |
| 5. | "Win-O" | Connie Crayton | Pee Wee Crayton | 5:29 |
| 6. | "Hope You Realize It (Goodbye Again)" | Joe Bonamassa; Tom Hambridge | Original | 3:58 |
| 7. | "Lazy Poker Blues" | Clifford Adams; Peter Green | Fleetwood Mac | 3:17 |
| 8. | "You Sure Drive a Hard Bargain" | Bettye Crutcher; Allen Jones | Albert King | 3:59 |
| 9. | "The Truth Hurts" (featuring Josh Smith and Kirk Fletcher) | Bob Greenlee; Ernie Lancaster; Kenny Neal; Jim Payne | Kenny Neal | 4:35 |
| 10. | "Is It Safe to Go Home" | Josh Smith | Original | 6:22 |
| Total length: | | | | 42:33 |

== Personnel ==
Credits adapted from the album's liner notes.

- Joe Bonamassa – vocals, lead guitar
- Josh Smith – guitar, production
- Roy Weisman – executive production
- Calvin Turner – bass, horn arrangements, string arrangements
- Lemar Carter – drums
- Reese Wynans – keyboards, B3
- Steve Patrick – trumpet
- Jeff Bailey – trumpet
- Jimmy Bowland – saxophone, flute, alto flute
- Mark Douthit – saxophone
- Barry Breen – trombone
- Matt Jefferson – bass trombone
- Paulie Cerra – saxophone on "I Want to Shout About It"
- Jade MacRae – background vocals
- Dannielle DeAndrea – background vocals
- Charles Jones – background vocals
- Mahalia Barnes – background vocals
- David Angell – violin, leader
- Conni Ellisor – violin
- Janet Darnall – violin
- Carrie Bailey – violin
- Jenny Bifano – violin
- Ali Hoffman – violin
- Monisa Angell – viola
- Elizabeth Lamb – viola
- Anthony La Marchina – cello
- Sari Reist – cello
- J. J. Blair – engineering
- Austin Atwood – engineering
- George Janho – engineering assistance
- Zack Zajdel – engineering assistance
- Ryan Yount – engineering assistance
- Alan Hertz – mixing
- Eric Boulanger – mastering
- Sharon Corbitt – studio photography
- Kate Moss – package design

== Charts ==
Chart performance for Blues Deluxe Vol. 2
| Chart (2023) | Peak position |
|---|---|
| Austrian Albums (Ö3 Austria) | 7 |
| Belgian Albums (Ultratop Flanders) | 27 |
| Belgian Albums (Ultratop Wallonia) | 48 |
| Dutch Albums (Album Top 100) | 9 |
| French Albums (SNEP) | 86 |
| German Albums (Offizielle Top 100) | 7 |
| Polish Albums (ZPAV) | 11 |
| Scottish Albums (OCC) | 6 |
| Swiss Albums (Schweizer Hitparade) | 6 |
| UK Albums (OCC) | 77 |
| UK Independent Albums (OCC) | 6 |
