= Breakthrough (Joe Bonamassa album) =

Studio album by Joe Bonamassa
- Released: July 18, 2025
- Recorded: 2025
- Studios: Black Rock Studios (Santorini, Greece), Ocean Way Studio (Nashville, Tennessee), Sunset Sound (Hollywood, California)
- Genre: Blues rock
- Length: 45:39
- Labels: J&R Adventures; Provogue
- Producer: Kevin Shirley

Joe Bonamassa chronology
Blues Deluxe Vol. 2 (2023)	Breakthrough (2025)

Singles from Breakthrough
- 1. "Shake This Ground " Released: February 28, 2025; 2. "Still Walking With Me " Released: March 28, 2025; 3. "Breakthrough " Released: April 25, 2025; 4. "Drive By The Exit Sign " Released: May 23, 2025; 5. "Trigger Finger " Released: June 20, 2025

Breakthrough is the seventeenth solo studio album by American blues rock musician Joe Bonamassa. It was released on July 18, 2025, via J&R Adventures. It was recorded in early-mid 2025 at different studios and is produced by Kevin Shirley.

== Track listing ==
No.	Title	Writer(s)	Length
1.	"Breakthrough"	Joe Bonamassa; Tom Hambridge	4:10
2.	"Trigger Finger"	Bonamassa; Hambridge	4:04
3.	"I'll Take the Blame"	Bonamassa; Gary Nicholson	3:34
4.	"Drive by the Exit Sign"	Bonamassa; Kevin Shirley; James House	4:19
5.	"Broken Record"	Bonamassa	6:58
6.	"Shake This Ground"	Bonamassa; House	4:07
7.	"Still Walking with Me"	Bonamassa; Hambridge	3:40
8.	"Life After Dark"	Bonamassa; Shirley	4:55
9.	"You Don't Own Me"	Bonamassa; Shirley	4:03
10.	"Pain's on Me"	Bonamassa; Hambridge	5:46
Total length:			45:39

== Personnel ==
- Joe Bonamassa – lead vocals, guitar, slide guitar
- Jade MacRae – backing vocals
- Danielle DeAndrea – backing vocals
- Josh Smith – guitar
- Reese Wynans – keyboards
- Lemar Carter – drums, percussion (tracks: 1–4, 6–10)
- Calvin Turner – bass (tracks: 1–4, 6–10)
- Greg Morrow – drums (track: 5)
- Stephen Mackey – bass (track: 5)
- Kevin "Caveman" Shirley – producer, mixing, photography
- Austin Atwood – engineering (tracks: 2, 4, 5, 8–10)
- Kostas Kalimeris – engineering (tracks: 2, 4, 8–10)
- Nate Haessly – engineering (tracks: 1, 3, 6, 7)
- Bob Ludwig – mastering
- Brian Lee – mastering
- Bob Jackson – mastering
- Roy Weisman – executive producer
- Hugh Syme – art direction, design and illustrations

== Charts ==
Chart (2025)	Peak position
Belgian Albums (Ultratop Wallonia)	41
Dutch Albums (Album Top 100)	6
US Top Blues Albums (Billboard)	1
UK Albums (Official Charts)	38
