= Royal Tea =

Studio album by Joe Bonamassa
- Released: October 23, 2020
- Recorded: January 2020
- Studio: Abbey Road (London, UK)
- Genre: Blues rock
- Length: 53:09
- Label: J&R Adventures; Provogue
- Producer: Kevin Shirley

Joe Bonamassa chronology
Redemption (2018)	Royal Tea (2020)	Time Clocks (2021)

Royal Tea is the fourteenth solo studio album by American blues rock musician Joe Bonamassa. It was released on October 23, 2020, via J&R Adventures. It was recorded in January 2020 at Abbey Road Studios in London and produced by Kevin Shirley.

At the 64th Annual Grammy Awards held in 2022, the album has been nominated for a Grammy Award for Best Contemporary Blues Album, but lost to Christone "Kingfish" Ingram's 662.

The album was followed by a twelve-track live release, Now Serving: Royal Tea Live from the Ryman, which includes all songs from Royal Tea except "Savannah".

== Critical reception ==
Professional ratings
Aggregate scores
Source	Rating
Metacritic	75/100
Review scores
Source	Rating
AllMusic	4/5 stars
American Songwriter	4/5 stars
Classic Rock	4/5 stars

Royal Tea was met with generally favorable reviews from music critics. At Metacritic, which assigns a normalized rating out of 100 to reviews from mainstream publications, the album received an average score of 75, based on four reviews.

AllMusic's Stephen Thomas Erlewine praised the album, stating: "Bonamassa has plenty of opportunity to show his facility with synthesizing different classic guitarists -- there's a bit of Rory Gallagher and Peter Green to offset his Claptonisms -- but the best moment on Royal Tea is "A Conversation with Alice", a chiming bit of soul-pop where he channels the best moments of Steve Marriott". Hal Horowitz of American Songwriter wrote: "nothing quite tops those two selections but there is enough strong Bonamassa playing and diverse material (like the lovely, Allman Brothers Band "Midnight Rider" lope of "Savannah" featuring Bonamassa's rarely heard mandolin work), to make this album a highlight of his bulging, and ever expanding, catalog". Hugh Fielder of Classic Rock determined: "the best thing about Royal Tea is that every track could easily drop into Bonamassa's live show – which is more than you can say for Redemption. Back on track in every sense".

=== Accolades ===
Accolades for Royal Tea
Publication	Accolade	Rank	Ref.
Louder	The 50 best albums of 2020	4	

== Track listing ==
No.	Title	Writer(s)	Length
1.	"When One Door Opens"	Joe Bonamassa; Kevin Shirley; Pete Brown	7:34
2.	"Royal Tea"	Bonamassa; James House; Shirley	4:28
3.	"Why Does It Take So Long to Say Goodbye"	Bonamassa; Bernie Marsden	6:44
4.	"Lookout Man"	Bonamassa; Shirley; Brown; Mike McCully	5:31
5.	"High Class Girl"	Bonamassa; Marsden	4:53
6.	"A Conversation With Alice"	Bonamassa; Marsden	4:19
7.	"I Didn’t Think She Would Do It"	Bonamassa; Marsden; Brown	4:11
8.	"Beyond the Silence"	Bonamassa	6:45
9.	"Lonely Boy"	Bonamassa; Jools Holland; Dave Stewart	4:06
10.	"Savannah"	Bonamassa; Marsden	4:38
Total length:			53:09

Bonus tracks
No.	Title	Writer(s)	Length
11.	"Don't You Do Me No Favours"	Bonamassa; Marsden	5:38
12.	"Don't Hand Me Your Hangups"	Bonamassa; Marsden	4:13
Total length:			63:00

== Personnel ==
- Joe Bonamassa – vocals & guitar, mandolin (track 10)
- Jade MacRae – backing vocals (tracks: 1–6)
- Juanita Tippins – backing vocals (tracks: 1–5)
- Mahalia Barnes – backing vocals (track 6)
- Bernie Marsden – backing vocals (track 10)
- Doug Henthorn – backing vocals (track 11)
- Kevin "Caveman" Shirley – acoustic guitar (tracks: 3, 4), percussion (track 4), producer, mixing
- Rob McNelley – rhythm guitar (tracks: 6, 7, 11)
- Reese Wynans – organ, Wurlitzer piano (tracks: 6, 10), piano (tracks: 8, 12)
- Julian Miles "Jools" Holland – piano (track 9)
- Michael Rhodes – bass
- Anton Fig – drums (tracks: 1–10, 12), percussion (tracks: 4, 8, 11)
- Jeff Bova – orchestration (track 1), percussion (track 2)
- Greg Morrow – drums (tracks: 4, 11), percussion (track 4)
- Paulie Cerra – saxophone (tracks: 9, 12)
- Ron Dziubla – baritone saxophone (tracks: 9, 12)
- Lee Thornburg – trumpet and horn arrangement (tracks: 9, 12)
- Errol Litton – harmonica (track 4)
- The Bovaland Symphonic Orchestra – orchestra (track 1)
- Christopher James Parker – engineering
- Marta Maria Di Nozzi – engineering assistant
- Bob Ludwig – mastering
- Jonathan Hicks – overdubbing
- Austin Atwood – overdubbing
- Ben Rodgers – overdubbing
- Roy Weisman – executive producer
- Kate Moss – design
- Christie Goodwin – photography
- Rick Gould – additional photography
- David Lamont – additional photography

== Charts ==
Chart (2020)	Peak position
Austrian Albums (Ö3 Austria)	3
Belgian Albums (Ultratop Flanders)	9
Belgian Albums (Ultratop Wallonia)	33
Canadian Albums (Billboard)	75
Dutch Albums (Album Top 100)	3
Finnish Albums (Suomen virallinen lista)	20
French Albums (SNEP)	52
German Albums (Offizielle Top 100)	5
Italian Albums (FIMI)	41
Norwegian Albums (VG-lista)	39
Scottish Albums (OCC)	5
Swedish Albums (Sverigetopplistan)	47
Swiss Albums (Schweizer Hitparade)	4
UK Albums (OCC)	7
UK Album Downloads (OCC)	6
UK Independent Albums (OCC)	2
US Billboard 200	41
US Top Album Sales (Billboard)	6
US Top Rock Albums (Billboard)	7
US Top Current Album Sales (Billboard)	5
US Independent Albums (Billboard)	6
US Top Blues Albums (Billboard)	1
