= Different Shades of Blue =

Studio album by Joe Bonamassa
- Released: September 22, 2014
- Studio: Studio at the Palms (Las Vegas, Nevada); The Cave (Malibu, California)
- Genre: Blues rock
- Length: 48:19 (standard edition); 1:05:37 (Best Buy edition)
- Label: J&R Records
- Producer: Roy Weisman, Kevin Shirley

Joe Bonamassa chronology
Seesaw (2013)	Different Shades of Blue (2014)	Blues of Desperation (2016)

Professional ratings
Review scores
Source	Rating
AllMusic	3.5/5 stars
PopMatters	(8/10)

Different Shades of Blue is the eleventh studio album by blues rock guitarist Joe Bonamassa. It was released on September 22, 2014.

The album debuted at number 8 on the Billboard 200, which makes this Bonamassa's highest charting album, and his first top 10 on the chart. It was ranked No. 3 on Billboard's Year End Blues Album Chart of 2015. It has sold 96,000 copies in the United States as of February 2016.

== Track listing ==
No.	Title	Writer(s)	Length
1.	"Hey Baby (New Rising Sun)"	Jimi Hendrix	1:19
2.	"Oh Beautiful!"	Bonamassa, James House	5:28
3.	"Love Ain't a Love Song"	Bonamassa, Jerry Flowers	3:48
4.	"Living on the Moon"	Bonamassa, House	3:21
5.	"Heartache Follows Wherever I Go"	Bonamassa, House	4:33
6.	"Never Give All Your Heart"	Bonamassa, Jonathan Cain	5:24
7.	"I Gave Up Everything for You, 'Cept the Blues"	Bonamassa, Flowers, Jeffrey Steele	4:39
8.	"Different Shades of Blue"	Bonamassa, House	4:39
9.	"Get Back My Tomorrow"	Bonamassa, Flowers, Steele	4:46
10.	"Trouble Town"	Bonamassa, Gary Nicholson	4:56
11.	"So, What Would I Do"	Bonamassa	5:26
12.	"Scarlet Town (Best Buy Exclusive)"	Bob Dylan	7:57
13.	"Better The Devil You Know (Best Buy Exclusive)"	Bonamassa	4:41
14.	"Black Irish Eyes (Best Buy Exclusive)"	Bonamassa	4:33

== Personnel ==
=== Musicians ===
- Joe Bonamassa – guitar, vocals
- Reese Wynans – organ, piano
- Anton Fig – drums, percussion
- Carmine Rojas – bass
- Michael Rhodes – bass
- Lenny Castro – percussion
- Doug Henthorn – background vocals
- Melanie Williams – background vocals
- Lee Thornburg – horn arrangements, trombone, trumpet
- Ron Dziubla – saxophone
- The Bovaland Orchestra – strings
- Jeff Bova – string arrangements

=== Production ===
- Rik Gould – photography
- Mark Everton Gray – engineer
- Erik Kabik – photography
- Philippe Klose – photography
- Bob Ludwig – mastering
- Kevin Shirley – engineer, mixing, producer
- Brent Spear – technician at The Palms
- Dennis Friel – design, artwork

== Charts ==
Chart (2015)	Peak position
Austrian Albums (Ö3 Austria)	8
Belgian Albums (Ultratop Flanders)	22
Belgian Albums (Ultratop Wallonia)	19
Canadian Albums (Billboard)	15
Danish Albums (Hitlisten)	12
Finnish Albums (Suomen virallinen lista)	11
French Albums (SNEP)	27
German Albums (Offizielle Top 100)	3
Italian Albums (FIMI)	63
Dutch Albums (Album Top 100)	10
New Zealand Albums (RMNZ)	18
Norwegian Albums (VG-lista)	9
Swedish Albums (Sverigetopplistan)	22
Swiss Albums (Schweizer Hitparade)	5
UK Albums (OCC)	9
US Billboard 200	8
US Independent Albums (Billboard)	1
US Top Blues Albums (Billboard)	1
US Top Rock Albums (Billboard)	3
US Indie Store Album Sales (Billboard)	8

== Certifications ==
Region	Certification	Certified units/sales
Poland (ZPAV)	Gold	10,000^{‡}
^{‡} Sales+streaming figures based on certification alone.
