= Time Clocks =

Studio album by Joe Bonamassa
- Released: October 29, 2021
- Studio: Germano (New York); The Hit Factory (New York); The Cave (Sydney)
- Genre: Blues rock
- Length: 56:46
- Label: J&R Adventures; Provogue
- Producer: Kevin Shirley

Joe Bonamassa chronology
Royal Tea (2020)	Time Clocks (2021)	Blues Deluxe Vol. 2 (2023)

Professional ratings
Review scores
Source	Rating
American Songwriter	3.5/5 stars
Classic Rock	4.5/5 stars

Time Clocks is the fifteenth solo studio album by American blues rock musician Joe Bonamassa, released through J&R Adventures in North America and Provogue Records in Europe on October 29, 2021. "Notches", "The Heart That Never Waits" and the title track were released as singles prior to the album.

== Track listing ==
Time Clocks track listing
No.	Title	Writer(s)	Length
1.	"Pilgrimage"	Joe Bonamassa; Kevin Shirley; Bobby Summerfield	0:55
2.	"Notches"	Bonamassa; Charlie Starr; Shirley	7:03
3.	"The Heart That Never Waits"	Bonamassa; James House	5:51
4.	"Time Clocks"	Bonamassa; Shirley	7:07
5.	"Questions and Answers"	Bonamassa; House; Shirley	4:09
6.	"Mind's Eye"	Bonamassa; House	6:17
7.	"Curtain Call"	Bonamassa; House; Shirley	7:31
8.	"The Loyal Kind"	Bonamassa; Bernie Marsden	6:48
9.	"Hanging on a Loser"	Bonamassa; Tom Hambridge	4:17
10.	"Known Unknowns"	Bonamassa; Alyssa Bonagura	6:48
Total length:			56:46

== Personnel ==
Credits adapted from the album's liner notes.

- Joe Bonamassa – guitar (all tracks), vocals (tracks 2–10)
- Kevin Shirley – production, additional engineering (all tracks); piano, additional percussion (1); percussion (4, 9, 10)
- Steve Mackey – bass
- Bobby Summerfield – keyboards, percussion (1); "ear candy", additional percussion (2); whistle (8)
- Bunna Lawrie – digeridoo (1, 2)
- Anton Fig – drums (2–10), percussion (2, 3, 5, 7, 8, 10), bongos (9)
- Lachy Doley – piano (2–10), organ (3–10)
- Juanita Tippins – background vocals (2–10)
- Prinnie Stevens – background vocals (2–10)
- Mahalia Barnes – backing vocals (2, 3, 6–8)
- Rob McNelley – guitar (5)
- The Bovaland Orchestra – orchestra (5, 7)
- Jeff Bova – orchestration (5, 7)
- Greg Morrow – percussion (6)
- Bob Clearmountain – mixing
- Roy Weisman – executive production
- Jason Staniulis – engineering
- Nick Jones – engineering assistance
- Andrew Yanchyshyn – engineering assistance
- Pat Thrall – additional post-production
- Brandon Duncan – mixing assistance
- Adam Ayan – mastering
- Hugh Syme – art direction, design, illustrations

== Charts ==
Chart performance for Time Clocks
Chart (2021)	Peak position
Austrian Albums (Ö3 Austria)	6
Belgian Albums (Ultratop Flanders)	14
Belgian Albums (Ultratop Wallonia)	39
Dutch Albums (Album Top 100)	5
Finnish Albums (Suomen virallinen lista)	24
French Albums (SNEP)	54
German Albums (Offizielle Top 100)	3
Norwegian Albums (VG-lista)	32
Polish Albums (ZPAV)	13
Scottish Albums (OCC)	8
Swedish Albums (Sverigetopplistan)	56
Swiss Albums (Schweizer Hitparade)	4
UK Albums (OCC)	13
US Billboard 200	136
US Independent Albums (Billboard)	15
US Top Rock Albums (Billboard)	22
