= Bloodline (band) =

American blues-rock band, 1991–1996

- Bloodline promotional photo, 1994. From left to right: Waylon Krieger, Erin Davis, "Smokin' Joe" Bonamassa, Lou Segreti and Berry Oakley Jr.

Background information
- Origin: New York City, New York, USA
- Genres: Blues rock; hard rock
- Years active: 1991–1996
- Labels: EMI; Capitol
- Past members: Berry Oakley Jr. Joe Bonamassa; Waylon Krieger; Erin Davis; Lou Segreti; Aaron Hagar

Bloodline was an American blues-rock band from New York City, New York. Formed in 1991, the group originally featured vocalist Aaron Hagar, lead guitarist "Smokin' Joe" Bonamassa, rhythm guitarist Waylon Krieger, bassist Berry Oakley Jr., drummer Erin Davis and keyboardist Lou Segreti. After Hagar was fired due to creative differences, Oakley took over as lead vocalist and the group began recording demos for a planned studio album with producer Phil Ramone. Bloodline later signed with EMI Records and released their self-titled debut album in 1994, which was produced by Joe Hardy. The band broke up shortly after the album's touring cycle.

Originally formed as Bonamassa's backing band with the help of the guitarist's manager Roy Weisman, Bloodline's name was chosen based on the fact that four of the group's founding members were the sons of famous musicians – Hagar of Van Halen frontman Sammy Hagar, Krieger of former The Doors guitarist Robby Krieger, Oakley Jr. of original Allman Brothers Band bassist Berry Oakley, and Davis of prolific jazz trumpeter Miles Davis. Following the band's breakup, Bloodline's members went on to join a range of other rock groups, while Bonamassa started his solo career in 2000 with the release of his debut album A New Day Yesterday.

== History ==
After the young guitarist was turned down by several record labels as a solo artist, the idea of building a band around Joe Bonamassa was proposed by his manager Roy Weisman in 1991. That year, the guitarist performed at a tribute concert for Fender founder Leo Fender, which also featured former The Doors guitarist Robby Krieger's eponymous band, a group which included Krieger's son Waylon on rhythm guitar and The Allman Brothers Band bassist Berry Oakley's son Berry Jr. on bass. Bonamassa approached Oakley Jr. with the idea of forming a band together, with Krieger included on the suggestion of the bassist, and jazz trumpeter Miles Davis's son Erin added on drums later. After enlisting lead vocalist Aaron Hagar (son of Van Halen frontman Sammy Hagar) and keyboardist Lou Segreti (a former bandmate of Bonamassa's), the band was finalised and the name Bloodline chosen based on the fact that four members were the sons of famous musicians.

After the finalisation of the band's formation, Bloodline began recording their first demos with producer Phil Ramone, initially working in Fort Lauderdale, Florida and later in Manhattan, New York. Hagar was fired from the band later in the year, primarily due to a differing opinion on the musical direction of the group – Segreti stated that "he was leaning toward commercial ballads while the rest of Bloodline wanted to stick to the blues". The band later recorded their self-titled debut album with producer and engineer Joe Hardy at Ardent Studios in Memphis, Tennessee, which was released by EMI and Capitol Records on August 23, 1994. The album's lead single "Stone Cold Hearted", released on August 8, registered at number 32 on the US Billboard Mainstream Rock Songs chart. The album received positive reviews from a number of publications including Cash Box magazine and The Washington Post, both of whom focused their praise on Bonamassa's lead guitar performance.

Bloodline toured extensively in promotion of their self-titled album, including a string of dates supporting Tesla and Lynyrd Skynyrd between May and July 1995. EMI also embarked on what Billboard magazine's Carrie Borzillo described as "one of its most aggressive marketing campaigns" in support of the album, including packaging sampler cassette tapes with The Allman Brothers Band live album An Evening with the Allman Brothers Band: 2nd Set, giving away free copies of the band's third single "Calling Me Back", and running a competition to win a Fender guitar before each show on the tour. After the touring cycle, Bloodline announced to Weisman that they wanted to continue the band without Bonamassa, changing their style from blues-rock to alternative rock; Weisman chose to relinquish his role with the band in favour of continuing to work with the guitarist on a solo career, and the group disbanded shortly after. Following the band's breakup, Davis worked as a manager of his father's estate, acting as executive producer on several of his posthumous releases; Oakley joined Los Angeles, California-based band Gift Horse, and Krieger continued performing in his father's band, as well as becoming an actor.

== Band members ==
Core lineup

- Berry Oakley Jr. – bass, lead vocals
- "Smokin' Joe" Bonamassa – lead guitar
- Waylon Krieger – rhythm guitar, backing vocals
- Erin Davis – drums, percussion
- Lou Segreti – keyboards, backing vocals

Former members

- Aaron Hagar – lead vocals (1991–92)

== Discography ==
Studio albums

- Bloodline (1994)

Singles

- "Stone Cold Hearted" (1994)
- "Dixie Peach" (1994)
- "Calling Me Back" (1995)
