= Driving Towards the Daylight =

Studio album by Joe Bonamassa
- Released: May 22, 2012
- Recorded: Studio at the Palms (Las Vegas, Nevada); Village Recorder (Los Angeles, California); The Cave (Malibu, California)
- Genre: Blues rock
- Length: 56:19
- Label: Provogue Records; J&R Records/Fontana
- Producer: Kevin Shirley

Joe Bonamassa chronology
| Don't Explain (2011) | Driving Towards the Daylight (2012) | Beacon Theatre: Live From New York (2012) |

Professional ratings
Review scores
| Source | Rating |
|---|---|
| AllMusic | 3.5/5 stars |
| Classic Rock | 8/10 stars |
| Financial Times | 3/5 stars |
| The Independent | (not rated) |
| Rolling Stone | 3/5 stars |

Driving Towards the Daylight is the tenth studio album by blues rock guitarist Joe Bonamassa, released on May 22, 2012. Recorded at The Village Recorder in Los Angeles, CA and Studio at the Palms in Las Vegas, NV, Driving Towards the Daylight is a balanced and "back-to-basics album that highlights Bonamassa’s signature style of blues, roots, and rock & roll". Driving Towards the Daylight was produced by Kevin "Caveman" Shirley (Black Crowes, Aerosmith, Led Zeppelin), making this Bonamassa and Shirley's seventh album collaboration in six years.

== Track listing ==
| No. | Title | Writer(s) | Length |
|---|---|---|---|
| 1. | "Dislocated Boy" | Joe Bonamassa | 6:40 |
| 2. | "Stones in My Passway" (Originally recorded by Robert Johnson) | Robert Johnson | 3:58 |
| 3. | "Driving Towards the Daylight" | Bonamassa, Danny Kortchmar | 4:50 |
| 4. | "Who's Been Talking?" (Originally recorded by Howlin' Wolf) | Chester Burnett | 3:28 |
| 5. | "I Got All You Need" (Originally recorded by Koko Taylor) | Willie Dixon | 3:04 |
| 6. | "A Place in My Heart" (Originally recorded by Bernie Marsden) | Bernie Marsden | 6:48 |
| 7. | "Lonely Town Lonely Street" (Originally recorded by Bill Withers) | Bill Withers | 7:08 |
| 8. | "Heavenly Soul" | Bonamassa | 5:55 |
| 9. | "New Coat of Paint" (Originally recorded by Tom Waits) | Tom Waits | 4:06 |
| 10. | "Somewhere Trouble Don't Go" (Originally recorded by Buddy Miller) | Buddy Miller^{†} | 4:59 |
| 11. | "Too Much Ain't Enough Love" (feat. Jimmy Barnes; originally recorded by Jimmy Barnes) | Jimmy Barnes, Jonathan Cain, Neal Schon, Randy Jackson, Tony Brock | 5:37 |
| Total length: | | | 56:19 |

^† — erroneously listed as a Joe Bonamassa composition in the Driving Towards the Daylight CD booklet.

== Personnel ==
=== Musicians ===
- Joe Bonamassa – guitar (all tracks), vocals (all tracks except 11), Dobro (track 1), mandolin (track 8), backing vocals (track 11)
- Anton Fig – drums and percussion (all tracks)
- Arlan Schierbaum – organ (all tracks except 2), piano (tracks 2, 3, 7, 10 and 11)
- Kevin Shirley – guitar (tracks 2 and 6), tambourine (tracks 4 and 7), toy piano (track 1), cowbell (track 10), percussion (track 11)
- Brad Whitford – guitar (tracks 1–4, 7, 9 and 11)
- Michael Rhodes – bass (tracks 1–4, 7, 9 and 11)
- Doug Henthorn – backing vocals (tracks 1, 3, 8, 10 and 11)
- Carmine Rojas – bass (tracks 5, 6, 8 and 10)
- Blondie Chaplin – guitar (tracks 5, 6 and 8)

=== Additional musicians ===
- Harrison Whitford – guitar (track 3)
- Jeff Bova and The Bovaland Brass – horns (track 6)
- Pat Thrall – guitar (track 7)
- Jimmy Barnes – vocals (track 11)

=== Production ===
- Kevin Shirley – producer, mixing.
- Mark Gray – engineering (tracks 1, 2, 3, 4, 7, 9 and 11)
- Chris Owens – engineering (tracks 5, 6, 8 and 10)
- Jared Kvitka – additional engineering
- Leon Zervos – mastering
- Marcus Bird – photography and direction
- Dennis Friel – design, illustrations
- Rick Gould – photographer

== Chart performance ==
The album debuted at number 2 in the UK. This constitutes the highest performance to date of a Joe Bonamassa album on a non-blues- or rock-specific chart. In Canada, the album debuted at number 55. In the U.S. the album debuted at number 1 on the Blues albums chart and number 23 on the Billboard 200.
