= Beacon Theatre: Live from New York =

Live album by Joe Bonamassa
- Released: September 24, 2012 (UK); September 25, 2012 (US)
- Recorded: November 4–5, 2011
- Venue: Beacon Theatre (New York City)
- Genre: Blues rock
- Length: 118:59
- Label: Provogue Records; J&R Records/Fontana
- Producer: Kevin Shirley

Joe Bonamassa chronology
Driving Towards the Daylight (2012)	Beacon Theatre: Live from New York (2012)	An Acoustic Evening at the Vienna Opera House (2013)

Professional ratings
Review scores
Source	Rating
Allmusic	3.5/5 stars

Beacon Theatre: Live from New York is the fifth live album by the American blues rock musician Joe Bonamassa. The album was recorded across two nights on November 4 and 5, 2011 at the Beacon Theatre in New York and released by J&R Adventures on DVD on March 8, 2012, and later on CD on September 24, 2012.

== Track listing ==
Disc one

No.	Title	Writer(s)	Length
1.	"72nd St. Subway Blues (Intro)"	Joe Bonamassa	1:05
2.	"Slow Train"	Bonamassa, Kevin Shirley	6:35
3.	"Cradle Rock"	Rory Gallagher	4:22
4.	"When the Fire Hits the Sea"	Bonamassa	3:43
5.	"Midnight Blues"	Gary Moore	7:49
6.	"Dust Bowl"	Bonamassa	7:06
7.	"The River"	Bonamassa, Bob Held	6:35
8.	"I´ll Take Care of You" (feat. Beth Hart)	Brook Benton	5:41
9.	"Sinner's Prayer" (feat. Beth Hart)	Lloyd Glenn, Lowell Fulson	5:04
10.	"You Better Watch Yourself"	Walter Jacobs, Bonamassa	4:10
11.	"Steal Your Heart Away"	Bobby Parker	3:52

Disc two

No.	Title	Writer(s)	Length
1.	"Bird on a Wire"	Leonard Cohen	5:45
2.	"Down Around My Place" (feat. John Hiatt)	John Hiatt	5:51
3.	"I Know a Place" (feat. John Hiatt)	Hiatt	4:38
4.	"Blue and Evil"	Bonamassa	6:50
5.	"Walk in My Shadows" (feat. Paul Rodgers)	Fraser, Simon Kirke, Paul Kossoff, Rodgers	4:58
6.	"Fire and Water" (feat. Paul Rodgers)	Andy Fraser, Paul Rodgers	4:38
7.	"Mountain Time"	Bonamassa, Will Jennings	12:32
8.	"Young Man Blues"	Mose Allison	9:39
9.	"If Heartaches Were Nickels"	Warren Haynes	8:06
10.	"Woke Up Dreaming bonus"		11:01

== Personnel ==
=== Musicians ===
- Joe Bonamassa – guitar, vocals
- Tal Bergman – percussion
- Rick Melick – keyboards
- Carmine Rojas – bass guitar

=== Guest musicians ===
- Beth Hart – vocals
- John Hiatt – vocals, acoustic guitar
- Paul Rodgers – vocals

=== Production personnel ===
- Erin Cook – public relations
- Warren Cracknell – production manager
- Justin Duguid – lighting design
- Clancy Fraser – tour manager
- Dennis Friel – photography
- Christie Goodwin – photography
- Mike Hickey – guitar technician
- Thomas Jeffries – drum technician
- Michael Jensen – public relations
- Jared Kvitka – engineer
- Colin Moody – bass technician, keyboard technician, stage manager
- Peter Noble – public relations
- Neil O'Brien – booking
- Eric Roa – pro-tools, system engineer
- Pete Sangha – booking
- Kevin Shirley – mixing, photography, producer
- Jonathan Smith – monitor engineer
- Will Taylor – public relations
- Roy Weisman – executive producer
- Mark Weiss – photography
- David Wexler – photography
- Leon Zervos – mastering

== Charts ==
=== Weekly charts ===
Chart performance for Beacon Theatre: Live from New York
Chart (2012)	Peak position
Austrian Albums (Ö3 Austria)	50
Belgian Albums (Ultratop Flanders)	70
Belgian Albums (Ultratop Wallonia)	49
Dutch Albums (Album Top 100)	45
French Albums (SNEP)	107
German Albums (Offizielle Top 100)	34
Scottish Albums (OCC)	47
Swiss Albums (Schweizer Hitparade)	65
UK Albums (OCC)	58

Chart (2012)	Peak
US Billboard 200	56
US Independent Albums (Billboard)	10
US Top Rock Albums (Billboard)	24
