= Joe Bonamassa =

American musician (born 1977)

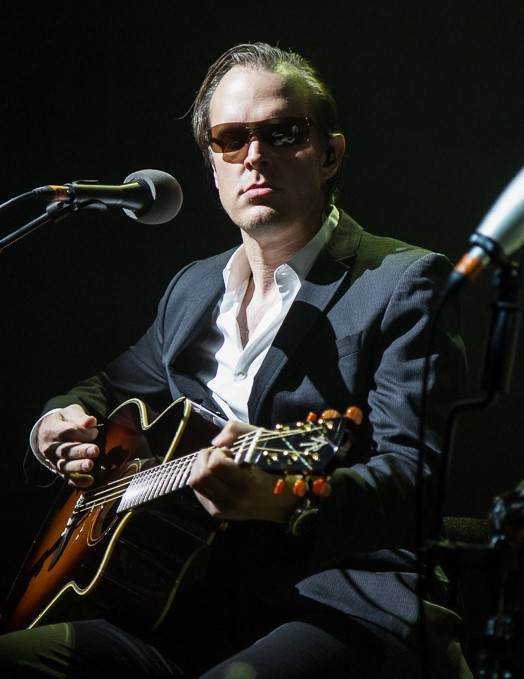
- Bonamassa performing in 2013

Background information
- Born: Joseph Leonard Bonamassa; May 8, 1977 (age 49); New Hartford, New York, U.S.
- Genres: Blues rock; hard rock; blues; rock and roll
- Occupations: Musician; singer; songwriter
- Instruments: Guitar; vocals
- Years active: 1989–present
- Labels: J&R Adventures; Provogue; Keeping the Blues Alive
- Member of: Black Country Communion; Rock Candy Funk Party
- Formerly of: Bloodline
- Website: jbonamassa.com

Joseph Leonard Bonamassa (/ˌbɑːnəˈmɑːsə/ BAH-nə-MAH-sə; born May 8, 1977) is an American blues rock guitarist, singer and songwriter. He started his career at age twelve, when he opened for B. B. King.

Since 2000, Bonamassa has released seventeen solo studio albums via his independent record label J&R Adventures. As of his latest studio album, Breakthrough (2025), he holds the record for most No. 1 blues albums with 29 (a total of 30 including the collaborative B.B. King's Blues Summit 100 in 2026). Bonamassa has played alongside many notable blues and rock artists, and has received five nominations for Grammy Awards. Among guitarists, he is known for his extensive collection of vintage guitars and amplifiers.

In 2011, Bonamassa started the nonprofit 501(c)(3) organization Keeping the Blues Alive Foundation. In 2020, he created Keeping the Blues Alive Records, an independent record label that promotes and supports the talent of blues musicians. Notable artists include Dion, Joanne Shaw Taylor, Joanna Connor, and Larry McCray. Bonamassa produces and collaborates on many of the projects.

== Early life ==
Bonamassa was born in New Hartford, New York, and grew up in Utica, New York. He is of Italian descent. He started playing guitar at age four, encouraged by his father, who was an avid music fan and exposed him to British blues rock records by Eric Clapton and Jeff Beck, greatly inspiring him. At eleven years old, Bonamassa was mentored and trained by American guitarist Danny Gatton. When he was twelve years old, he had his own band called Smokin' Joe Bonamassa, which gigged around western New York and Pennsylvania, including cities such as Scranton and Buffalo, only on weekends since he had school on weekdays. Bonamassa played a crimson 1972 Fender Stratocaster he called "Rosie", given to him by his father.

Bonamassa opened for B.B. King at approximately twenty shows in 1989. Before he reached eighteen years old, Bonamassa was playing in a band called Bloodline with the sons of Miles Davis, Robby Krieger and Berry Oakley. Although Bloodline did not become a famous act, it attracted some attention to Bonamassa's guitar ability.

== Career ==
=== 2000–2019 ===
Bonamassa's debut studio album, A New Day Yesterday, was released in 2000. It features original tunes and covers of artists such as Rory Gallagher, Jethro Tull and Warren Haynes. The album features a guest appearance by Gregg Allman on the song "If Heartaches Were Nickels", and was produced by Tom Dowd. The album reached No. 9 on the Billboard Blues chart.

Between 2002 and 2006, Bonamassa had three studio albums hit No. 1 on the Billboard Blues charts, and all five of his solo studio albums made the Top 10. In 2009, Bonamassa fulfilled one of his childhood dreams by playing at the Royal Albert Hall in London, where Eric Clapton played a duet with him. Bonamassa's live album, Beacon Theatre: Live from New York, was released in 2012. The show featured one of Bonamassa's musical heroes, Paul Rodgers (formerly of the bands Free and Bad Company), as a guest.

The live acoustic album, An Acoustic Evening at the Vienna Opera House, was released as a CD/DVD/Blu-ray set on March 26, 2013. This concert marked the first time Bonamassa played a wholly acoustic show. The acoustic ensemble that performed the show was assembled with the help of Bonamassa's longtime producer, Kevin Shirley. The concluding, three-night stand of Bonamassa's spring 2013 tour, occurred at the famous Beacon Theatre in New York City. In March 2013, Bonamassa performed four shows in London featuring three different bands (and a horn section at one show), covering four different sides of his music. Each show had a unique set list. The shows were recorded for a DVD release, and the set of DVDs was released in October 2013 as Tour de Force.

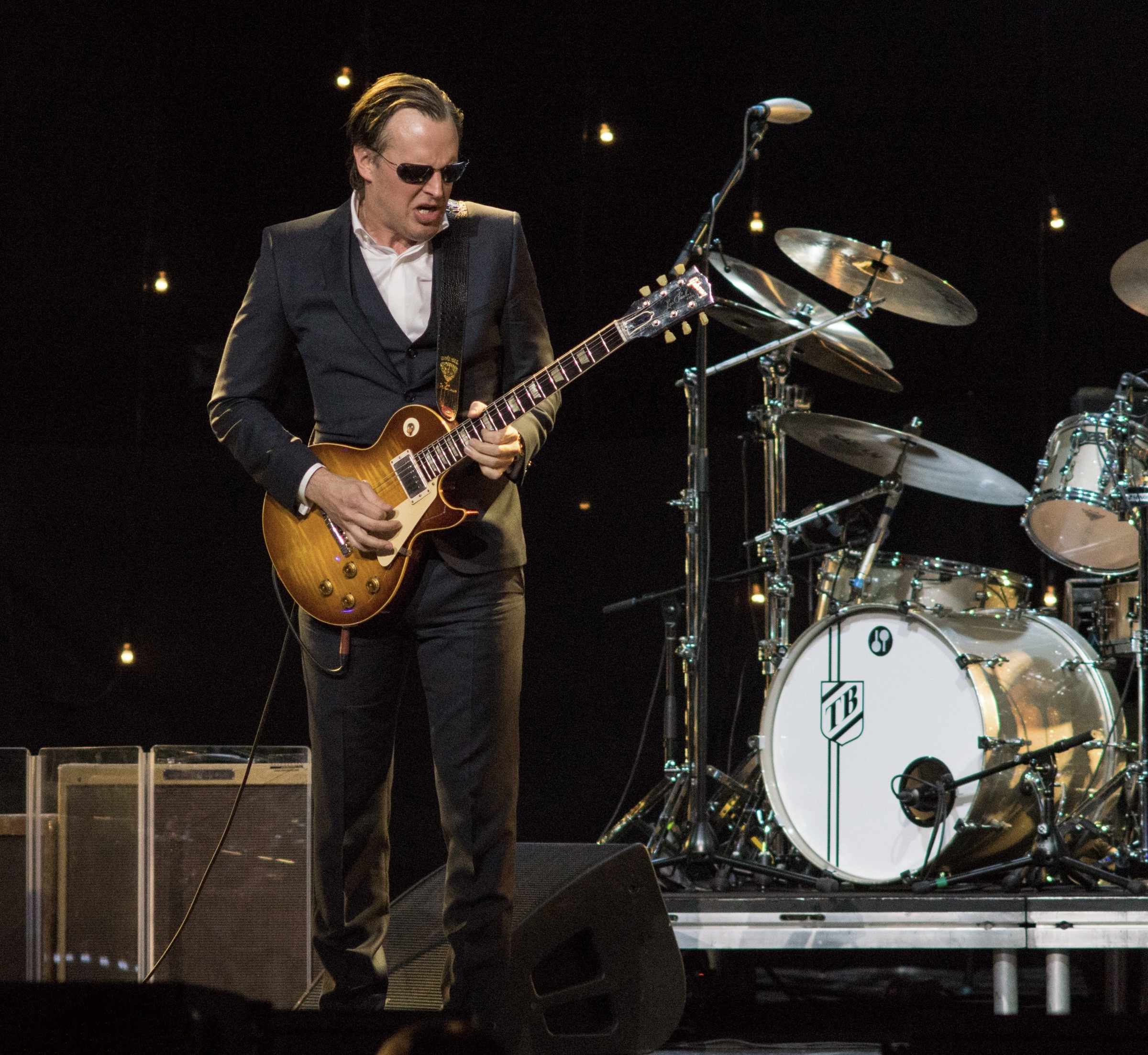
Bonamassa performing at Radio City Music Hall in 2015

Bonamassa's album Different Shades of Blue is his first solo studio album since So, It's Like That to showcase only original songs (with the exception of a brief instrumental Jimi Hendrix cover). Bonamassa wrote the album in Nashville with three songwriters: Jonathan Cain of Journey, James House (known for his work with Diamond Rio), Dwight Yoakam, Martina McBride and Jerry Flowers (who has written for Keith Urban). Bonamassa sought to create serious blues rock in the project, instead of three-minute radio hits. The album was recorded at a music studio in the Palms Hotel in Las Vegas. The album charted at No. 8 on the Billboard 200, No. 1 on the blues chart, and No. 1 on the indie chart.

In May 2015, Bonamassa won a Blues Music Award in the Instrumentalist – Guitar category. In April 2018, Bonamassa's signature amplifier, the '59 Twin-Amp JB Edition, was released by Fender. On June 27, 2018, Bonamassa premiered at the Grand Ole Opry. He made a guest appearance after being introduced by Chase Bryant, and playing along with him in his final song of the set, "I Need a Cold Beer".

=== 2020–present ===
In October 2020, Bonamassa released the No. 1 blues album Royal Tea. On June 11, 2021, the live album and film Now Serving: Royal Tea Live from the Ryman was released. It was from his one-night-only concert, at the historic Ryman Auditorium in Nashville, Tennessee, on September 20, 2020. The show was live-streamed at the time, and raised $32,000 for Bonamassa's Fueling Musicians program, which had been helping financially struggling musicians during the COVID-19 pandemic.

Joe Bonamassa at the Baloise Session “TRUE AMERICAN ROOTS”, 3 November 2026 in Basel.

On November 21, 2022, Bonamassa announced in a since-deleted post on Instagram that he would no longer use social media, fearing that he would "be provoked one day into saying something I might regret.” He had replied to a trolling post harshly a few days prior. He stated that future Instagram posts would not be made by him. By January 2, 2023, he had returned to Instagram and stated he would check back in periodically.

Additional studio and live albums released during this period include: Time Clocks (2021), Blues Deluxe Vol. 2 (2023), Tales of Time (2023), Live at the Hollywood Bowl (2024) and Breakthrough (2025). All of these albums reached No. 1 on the Billboard Top Blues Albums chart. Bonamassa also collaborated on the No. 1 blues album B.B. King's Blues Summit 100, released via KTBA Records on February 6, 2026.

=== Collaborations with Beth Hart ===
Bonamassa was first exposed to Beth Hart's music after seeing her play several television performances. The two would often cross paths when playing shows separately in Europe, and Bonamassa became very impressed with Hart when he caught her show at the Blue Balls Festival in Lucerne, Switzerland. While recording his album, Dust Bowl (and listening to the expanded edition of the Rolling Stones' Get Yer Ya-Ya's Out! which features tracks by Ike & Tina Turner), Bonamassa became inspired to try pairing up with a woman. Hart came to mind, and the two musicians met up in a hotel bar in Dublin. Bonamassa floated the idea, which Hart accepted immediately, although she was at first under the impression that he was asking her to sing backup vocals on his next album. When she realized that his intention was for her to sing lead vocals, she said "I was floored".

Bonamassa, Hart and producer Kevin Shirley wrote down lists of soul songs they liked to come up with material for the album, which was named Don't Explain. The group settled on twelve songs, although only ten ended up being recorded. Bonamassa and Hart each chose five songs for the album. Some of Hart's favorite tracks on the album included, "For My Friend" by Bill Withers, and "Sinner's Prayer" by Ray Charles. Bonamassa had wanted to do versions of Brook Benton's "I'll Take Care of You", and "Well Well" written by Delaney Bramlett and Bonnie Bramlett.

Their follow-up album, Seesaw, was nominated for a Grammy in the category of Best Blues Album in 2013. The song "Miss Lady" from the album, originally recorded by the Buddy Miles Express, was released in Europe via Provogue Records.

Hart and Bonamassa released, Black Coffee, on January 26, 2018. It was produced by Kevin Shirley.

=== Additional projects ===
Bonamassa is a member of the jazz-funk band Rock Candy Funk Party. In 2013, they released their debut album, We Want Groove. It was followed by Rock Candy Funk Party Takes New York – Live at the Iridium. The show was recorded over three nights, at the Iridium Jazz Club in New York City. The band played during Conan on February 10, 2014.

Bonamassa is the guitarist, and secondary lead vocalist, for the hard rock supergroup Black Country Communion. Since 2010, they have released five albums. The latest, simply titled V, was released in June 2024.

Bonamassa produced a podcast with another guitar aficionado, Matt Abramovitz, between August 2013 and July 2015. The Pickup Radio episodes are about "the life and lore of the guitar". Bonamassa and Abramovitz discuss their favorite guitars, guitarists and occasionally non-guitarists associated with the blues and rock genres. A total of 67 episodes where aired.

In August 2021, Bonamassa appeared as a contestant on To Tell the Truth.

In 2024, Bonamassa contributed guitar to a re-release of Mark Knopfler's "Going Home: Theme of the Local Hero" in aid of the Teenage Cancer Trust.

On September 7, 2025, Bonamassa was the special guest of The Who at the Chicago concert on their farewell tour.

In May 2026, he was a guest on BBC Two's Later... with Jools Holland.

== Guitar and amplifier collection ==
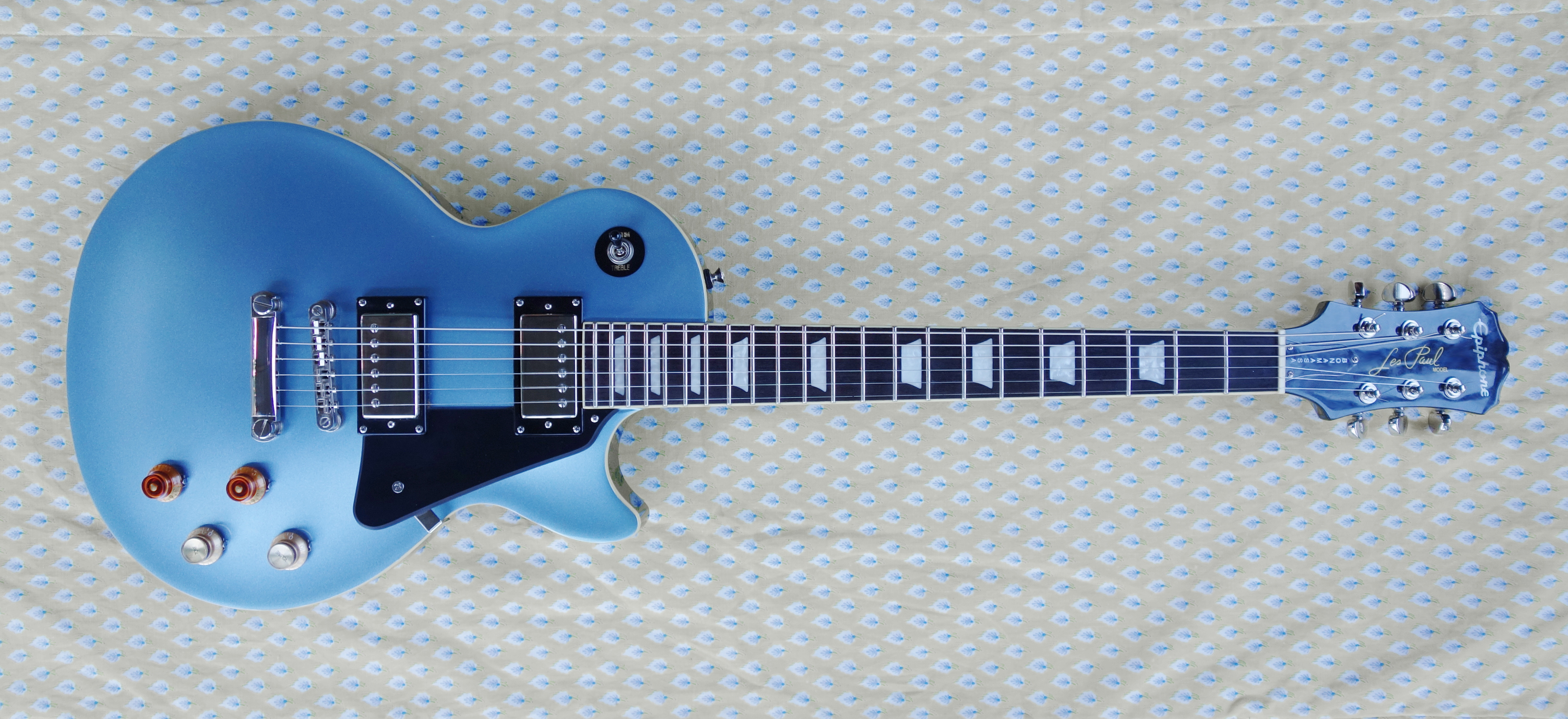
Bonamassa's signature Epiphone Les Paul

Bonamassa is known for his extensive collection of vintage amplifiers and guitars. He started collecting at an early age. His parents owned a music shop in upstate New York, which was later called Bonamassa Guitars. His first vintage guitar was a 1963 Stratocaster. He bought guitars compulsively for a while, including many he would never play, and then sold a lot of them to focus on guitars he could actually use. Additionally, Bonamassa has a collection of vintage "tweed" Fender amps.

In 2014, Bonamassa acquired a 1958 Gibson Flying V from Norman Harris of Norman's Rare Guitars. He named the guitar Amos after the original owner Amos Arthur. He plays the rare and valuable guitar in concerts. He is also a collector of Gibson Les Paul, including nearly a dozen "bursts" (1958–1960 Gibson Les Paul Standard). While Bonamassa is a world class gearhead, he does not like guitar pedals.

In a 2017 MusicRadar interview with Bonamassa and Black Country Communion collaborator Glenn Hughes, Bonamassa said:

"I’ve really gotten over pedals. I can’t keep up with this craze of boutique pedals that make you sound like everything but your guitar. I can’t get my head around it. So you don’t want to play a guitar [properly] so you buy a box that makes it sound like an algorithm, like you just fired up your computer and you can spend the night staring at your fuckin’ shoes? C’mon man… I know I’ll get shit for saying this, but it’s fucking lazy. It’s insulting to people who spent 35 years playing and learning, like a lot of players. And we continue to work at it! These guys can barely play a chord but call themselves soundscapists. Get the fuck outta here! It’s bullshit. There’s so much masking and spin going on there. Can we get real for a minute? What do you actually play? Pick up an acoustic guitar… try that!"

Bonamassa affectionately refers to the area of his home with vintage gear as the "Bona-seum". In a 2019 Guitar World interview, Bonamassa stated that he has more than 400 guitars and 400 amplifiers. "Joe Bonamassa has been playing, buying and collecting vintage guitars and amps for most of his life. He has a vast collection, enough to create his own museum of rare and vintage gear: the Bona-seum." He has specifically bought and sold multiple rare and expensive Dumble Amplifiers. Having sold his original three, he began to miss their sound, and started buying them again.

During an online interview in 2020, Bonamassa said that his favorite guitar is his 1951 Fender Telecaster, nicknamed "The Bludgeon" (which has been modified with a humbucking pickup in the neck position). In 2021, Fender and Bonamassa announced the release of a limited edition reproduction of "The Bludgeon", by Custom Shop Master Builder Greg Fessler. Also in 2021, Epiphone announced the release of a replica of his 1958 Gibson Les Paul Custom in black.

== Influences ==
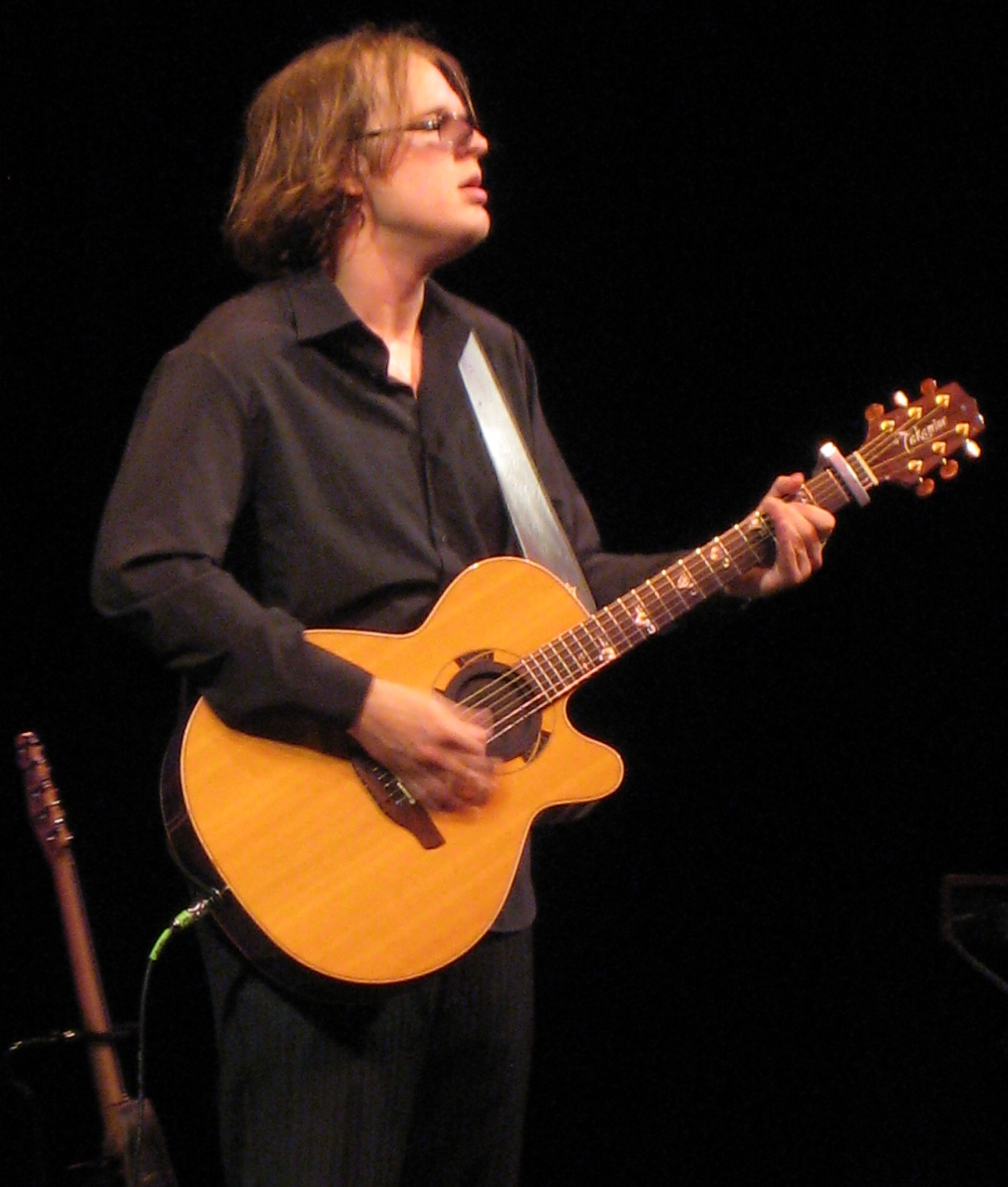
Bonamassa performing at Stafford, Texas in 2007

Unlike many blues rock guitarists who came before him, Bonamassa's influences are British and Irish blues acts, rather than American artists. In an interview in Guitarist magazine, he cited three albums that had the biggest influence on his playing: The Beano Album by John Mayall & the Bluesbreakers with Eric Clapton, Rory Gallagher's Irish Tour '74 and Goodbye by Cream. He also noted that Stevie Ray Vaughan's Texas Flood had a big influence when Bonamassa was young. Among other bands, he listed the early blues playing of Jethro Tull as an influence, and named both Martin Barre and Mick Abrahams as important musicians to him.

He elaborated on his influences:

You know, my heroes were the English guys – Paul Kossoff, Peter Green, Eric Clapton. There's so many – there's Gary Moore, Rory Gallagher – another Irish musician who played the same things, but don't tell him that. But those guys were my guys – Jeff Beck, Jimmy Page. There's a certain sophistication to their approach to the blues that I really like, more so than the American blues that I was listening to. B.B. King's a big influence – he's probably my biggest traditional influence. I love Muddy Waters, Robert Johnson and T-Bone Walker and stuff like that, but I couldn't sit down. I was always forcing myself to listen to whole records by them, where I'd rather listen to Humble Pie do "I'm Ready" than Muddy Waters, you know? I think, the English interpretation of the blues just hit me a lot better, you know?

In an October 2008 interview with Express & Star, he said:

When I heard Kossoff playing "Mr. Big" and when I heard Clapton playing "Crossroads" and when I heard Rory Gallagher playing "Cradle Rock", I was like, "This is way cooler.... British blues are my thing." When I heard Rod Stewart and the Jeff Beck Group singing "Let Me Love You", it changed my life. I knew exactly what I wanted to do. Those are my influences.

In a December 2012 interview with MusicRadar:

My friends would ask me, "Have you heard the new Van Halen record?" And I'd be like, "Nope." I was listening to Frank Marino and Mahogany Rush.

== Keeping the Blues Alive Records ==
In June 2020, Dion released Blues with Friends via Keeping the Blues Alive Records (KTBA), a new record label created by Bonamassa and Roy Weisman for Dion and other blues musicians to showcase their talents. The album features Van Morrison, Jeff Beck, Paul Simon, Bruce Springsteen, and others (including liner notes by Bob Dylan). The album reached No. 1 on the Billboard Blues Albums chart (9 weeks at No. 1 and 59 weeks total), and No. 4 on iTunes. It also charted in United Kingdom, Germany, France, Italy, Canada and Australia.

Dion also released "You Know It's Christmas" (featuring Bonamassa and co-written with Mike Aquilina) in 2020. Dion produced a music video for all songs, releasing them on his website and social media platforms, such as Facebook and YouTube.

Dion's song "Blues Comin' On" (with Bonamassa) from Blues with Friends was nominated for a 2021 Blues Music Award. The album was also awarded AllMusic's Favorite Blues Album.

Joanne Shaw Taylor released the charting single "If That Ain't a Reason" from the No. 1 The Blues Album (2021), and Joanna Connor released the No. 1 blues album 4801 South Indiana Avenue (2021) on the label.

Dion released Stomping Ground in November 2021, along with music videos. Except for a cover of "Red House", the songs were written by Dion and Aquilina. Multiple guest artists participated on the album, including Springsteen and Patti Scialfa on "Angels in the Alleyways", with extensive liner notes written by Pete Townshend. It became Dion's second No. 1 album on the Billboard blues chart.

Larry McCray (album Blues Without You) and Robert Jon & the Wreck (single "Waiting for Your Man") are also on the KTBA label, with music released by both in 2022. Blues Without You was nominated Best Contemporary Blues Album via the Blues Music Awards. The album was also voted the No. 1 album in 2022 by Blues Rock Review magazine.

In 2022, Joanne Shaw Taylor released Blues from the Heart: Live. The single and music video for "Can't You See What You're Doing to Me" features Kenny Wayne Shepherd. All projects were produced by Bonamassa.

Additional talent on the label include Dave Mason ("Dear Mr. Fantasy" featuring Bonamassa in 2023), Jimmy Hall and Marc Broussard.

In March 2024, Dion released Girl Friends on KTBA, marking his third No. 1 blues album. In October 2024, he released "An American Hero" with Carlene Carter, including music videos for all singles from the album.

In January 2025, Dion dropped the nostalgic single "New York Minute" from his album The Rock 'N' Roll Philosopher, released in October 2025. Dion also released a new version of his song "Abraham, Martin and John" on the album.

== Awards and nominations ==
| Year | Ceremony | Category | Nominated work | Result | Ref. |
|---|---|---|---|---|---|
| 2013 | 55th Grammy Awards | Best Blues Album | Seesaw | Nominated | |
| 2016 | 58th Grammy Awards | Best Traditional Blues Album | Live at the Greek Theatre | Nominated | |
| 2022 | 64th Grammy Awards | Best Contemporary Blues Album | Royal Tea | Nominated | |
| 2025 | 67th Grammy Awards | Best Contemporary Blues Album | Blues Deluxe Vol. 2 | Nominated | |
| 2026 | 68th Grammy Awards | Best Contemporary Blues Album | Breakthrough | Nominated | |

== Discography ==
Solo studio albums

- A New Day Yesterday (2000)
- So, It's Like That (2002)
- Blues Deluxe (2003)
- Had to Cry Today (2004)
- You & Me (2006)
- Sloe Gin (2007)
- The Ballad of John Henry (2009)
- Black Rock (2010)
- Dust Bowl (2011)
- Driving Towards the Daylight (2012)
- Different Shades of Blue (2014)
- Blues of Desperation (2016)
- Redemption (2018)
- Royal Tea (2020)
- Time Clocks (2021)
- Blues Deluxe Vol. 2 (2023)
- Breakthrough (2025)

Solo live albums

- A New Day Yesterday Live (2002)
- Shepherd's Bush Empire (2007)
- Live from Nowhere in Particular (2008)
- Live from the Royal Albert Hall (2009)
- Beacon Theatre: Live from New York (2012)
- An Acoustic Evening at the Vienna Opera House (2013)
- Tour de Force: Live in London – The Borderline (2014)
- Tour de Force: Live in London – Shepherd's Bush Empire (2014)
- Tour de Force: Live in London – Hammersmith Apollo (2014)
- Tour de Force: Live in London – Royal Albert Hall (2014)
- Muddy Wolf at Red Rocks (2015)
- Live at Radio City Music Hall (2015)
- Live at the Greek Theatre (2016)
- Live at Carnegie Hall: An Acoustic Evening (2017)
- British Blues Explosion Live (2018)
- Live at the Sydney Opera House (2019)
- Now Serving: Royal Tea Live from the Ryman (2021)
- Tales of Time (2023)
- Live at the Hollywood Bowl (2024)

With Black Country Communion

- Black Country Communion (2010)
- Black Country Communion 2 (2011)
- Live Over Europe (2011)
- Afterglow (2012)
- BCCIV (2017)
- V (2024)

With Rock Candy Funk Party

- We Want Groove (2013)
- Rock Candy Funk Party Takes New York: Live at the Iridium (2014)
- Groove Is King (2015)
- The Groove Cubed (2017)

With Beth Hart

- Don't Explain (2011)
- Seesaw (2013)
- Live in Amsterdam (2014)
- Black Coffee (2018)

With Sleep Eazys

- Easy to Buy, Hard to Sell (2020)
