= Blues of Desperation =

Studio album by Joe Bonamassa
- Released: March 25, 2016
- Studio: Grand Victor Sound (Nashville, Tennessee)
- Genre: Blues rock
- Length: 61:41
- Label: J&R Records
- Producer: Roy Weisman, Kevin Shirley

Joe Bonamassa chronology
Different Shades of Blue (2014)	Blues of Desperation (2016)	Black Coffee (2018)

Blues of Desperation is the twelfth studio album by American blues rock guitarist Joe Bonamassa. It was released on March 25, 2016 through J&R Records.

== Reception ==
Blues of Desperation has been given a Metacritic score of 73 out of 100 based on 6 critics, indicating generally favorable reviews.

The album debuted at No. 12 on Billboard 200, No. 2 on Top Rock Albums, and No. 1 on the Blues Albums chart, selling 25,000 copies in the first week. The album has sold 68,000 copies in the United States as of August 2016.

== Track listing ==
No.	Title	Writer(s)	Length
1.	"This Train"	Joe Bonamassa, James House	4:20
2.	"Mountain Climbing"	Bonamassa, Tom Hambridge	5:43
3.	"Drive"	Bonamassa, House	5:47
4.	"No Good Place for the Lonely"	Bonamassa, Gary Nicholson	8:38
5.	"Blues of Desperation"	Bonamassa, House	6:27
6.	"The Valley Runs Low"	Bonamassa, House	4:03
7.	"You Left Me Nothin' But the Bill and the Blues"	Bonamassa, House	4:10
8.	"Distant Lonesome Train"	Bonamassa, Hambridge	5:53
9.	"How Deep This River Runs"	Bonamassa, House	6:30
10.	"Livin' Easy"	Bonamassa, Jeffrey Steele, Jerry Flowers	4:37
11.	"What I've Known for a Very Long Time"	Bonamassa	5:33
Total length:			61:41

== Charts ==
=== Weekly charts ===
Chart (2016)	Peak position
Australian Albums (ARIA)	17
Austrian Albums (Ö3 Austria)	3
Belgian Albums (Ultratop Flanders)	14
Belgian Albums (Ultratop Wallonia)	16
Canadian Albums (Billboard)	17
Dutch Albums (Album Top 100)	2
Finnish Albums (Suomen virallinen lista)	15
French Albums (SNEP)	22
German Albums (Offizielle Top 100)	3
Hungarian Albums (MAHASZ)	13
Irish Albums (IRMA)	45
Italian Albums (FIMI)	17
New Zealand Albums (RMNZ)	16
Norwegian Albums (VG-lista)	9
Polish Albums (ZPAV)	8
Swedish Albums (Sverigetopplistan)	9
Swiss Albums (Schweizer Hitparade)	1
UK Albums (OCC)	3
US Billboard 200	12
US Top Rock Albums (Billboard)	2

=== Year-end charts ===
Chart (2016)	Position
Belgian Albums (Ultratop Flanders)	129
Belgian Albums (Ultratop Wallonia)	173
Swiss Albums (Schweizer Hitparade)	90
US Top Rock Albums (Billboard)	53

== Certifications ==
Region	Certification	Certified units/sales
Poland (ZPAV)	Gold	10,000^{‡}
^{‡} Sales+streaming figures based on certification alone.
