= Beth Hart discography =

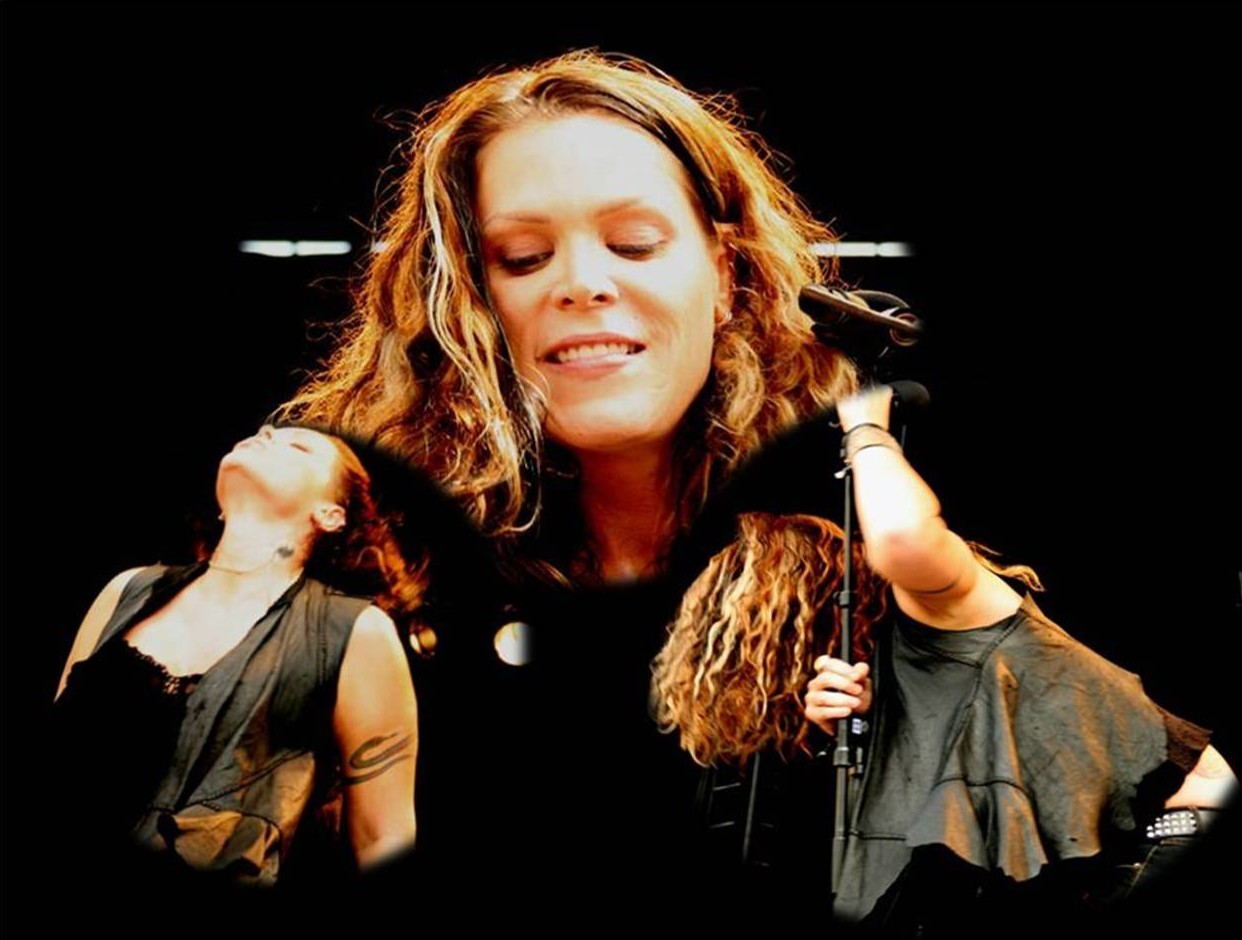
- Beth Hart performing in 2009
- Studio albums: 11
- EPs: 1
- Live albums: 4
- Singles: 32
- Video albums: 3

The discography of Beth Hart, an American singer-songwriter, comprises eleven studio albums, one extended play, three collaboration albums, four live albums and three video albums.

== Studio albums ==
=== As Beth Hart and The Ocean of Souls ===
Year	Album details
1993	Beth Hart and the Ocean of Souls: Released: 1993 (April 20, 2009); Label: self-released (Razz Records); Formats: CD, digital download

=== Solo albums ===
Year	Album details	Peak chart positions												Certifications
Year	Album details	US	US Blues	UK	DEN	NZ	NOR	SWE	FRA	SWI	AUT	GER	NLD	Certifications
1996	Immortal: Released: May 21, 1996; Label: 143 Records/Lava/Atlantic; Formats: CD, digital download	—	—	—	—	—	—	—	—	—	—	—	—	
1999	Screamin' for My Supper: Released: August 3, 1999; Label: 143 Records/Lava/Atlantic; Formats: CD, LP, digital download	143	—	—	—	22	—	—	—	—	—	—	97	
2003	Leave the Light On: Released: October 21, 2003; Label: Koch; Universal Music; Formats: CD, LP, digital download	—	—	—	5	21	23	—	—	—	—	—	17	IFPI DEN: 2× Platinum
2007	37 Days: Released: August 6, 2007; Label: Universal Music; Formats: CD, LP, digital download	—	—	—	1	—	18	—	—	—	—	—	14	IFPI DEN: Gold
2010	My California: Released: October 4, 2010; Label: Provogue/Mascot Records; Formats: CD, digital download	—	—	—	13	—	11	—	—	—	—	—	12	
2012	Bang Bang Boom Boom: Released: October 8, 2012; Label: Provogue/Mascot Records; Formats: CD, LP, digital download	—	3	52	6	—	24	40	59	34	50	39	8	
2015	Better Than Home: Released: April 10, 2015; Label: Provogue/Mascot Records; Formats: CD, LP, digital download	133	1	33	—	—	—	47	39	5	11	11	1	
2016	Fire on the Floor: Released: October 14, 2016; Label: Provogue/Mascot Records; Formats: CD, LP, digital download	115	1	28	—	—	28	51	41	13	18	18	6	
2019	War in My Mind: Released: September 27, 2019; Label: Provogue/Mascot Records; Formats: CD, LP, digital download	—	1	19	—	—	34	—	—	13	26	6	9	
2022	A Tribute to Led Zeppelin: Released: February 25, 2022; Label: Provogue/Mascot Records; Formats: CD, LP, digital download	—	—	17	—	—	—	—	36	3	2	4	1	
2024	You Still Got Me: Released: October 25, 2024; Label: Provogue/Mascot Records; Formats: CD, LP, digital download	—	1	—	—	—	—	—	84	6	5	7	4	
"—" denotes a release that did not chart or was not issued in that region.

=== Beth Hart with Joe Bonamassa ===
Year	Album details	Peak chart positions													Certifications
Year	Album details	US	US Blues	UK	DEN	FIN	NOR	SWE	FRA	SWI	AUT	GER	POL	NLD	Certifications
2011	Don't Explain: Released: September 27, 2011; Label: Provogue/Mascot Records; Formats: CD, LP, digital download	120	3	22	3	—	12	25	90	50	32	17	—	9	NVPI: Gold
2013	Seesaw: Released: May 17, 2013; Label: J&R Adventures; Formats: CD, LP, CD+DVD, digital download	47	1	27	22	44	4	25	87	28	20	19	37	11	
2018	Black Coffee: Released: January 26, 2018; Label: J&R Adventures; Formats: CD, LP, digital download	63	1	7	—	30	14	27	—	3	7	4	6	1	
"—" denotes a release that did not chart or was not issued in that region.

== Extended plays ==
Year	Details
2012	Introducing Beth Hart: Released: July 31, 2012; Label: Mascot Music Productions and Publishing BV; Format: Digital download

== Live albums ==
Year	Album details	Peak chart positions							
Year	Album details	US	US Blues	UK	FRA	SWI	GER	AUT	NLD
2005	Live at Paradiso: Released: September 6, 2005; Label: Koch; Universal Music; Formats: CD, digital download	—	—	—	—	—	—	—	88
2014	Live in Amsterdam (with Joe Bonamassa): Released: March 24, 2014; Label: J&R Adventures; Formats: CD, digital download	87	1	13	40	8	62	27	49
2018	Front and Center – Live from New York: Released: April 13, 2018; Label: Provogue/Mascot Records; Formats: CD, digital download	—	1	—	85	12	18	19	18
2018	Live at the Royal Albert Hall: Released: November 30, 2018; Label: Provogue/Mascot Records; Formats: 2-CD, 3-LP, digital download	—	—	97	—	61	33	63	59
"—" denotes a release that did not chart or was not issued in that region.

== Singles ==
Year	Title	Peak chart positions				Album
Year	Title	US	GER	NZ	NLD	Album
1996	"God Bless You"	—	—	—	—	Immortal
1999	"L.A. Song (Out of This Town)"	90	—	1	66	Screamin' for My Supper
1999	"Delicious Surprise"	—	—	—	—	Screamin' for My Supper
2004	"Leave the Light On"	—	89	25	90	Leave the Light On
2004	"World Without You"	—	—	—	—	Leave the Light On
2005	"Learning to Live"	—	—	—	83	37 Days
2007	"Good as It Gets"	—	—	—	—	37 Days
2008	"Take It Easy on Me"	—	—	—	—	My California
2010	"Sister Heroine" (featuring Slash)	—	—	—	—	My California
2010	"Like You (And Everyone Else)"	—	—	—	—	My California
2010	"Life Is Calling"	—	—	—	—	My California
2011	"Your Heart Is as Black as Night" (with Joe Bonamassa)	—	—	—	—	Don't Explain
2011	"I'll Take Care of You" (with Joe Bonamassa)	—	—	—	—	Don't Explain
2012	"Learning to Live" (re-issue)	—	—	—	—	Bang Bang Boom Boom
2012	"Baddest Blues"	—	—	—	—	Bang Bang Boom Boom
2012	"Bang Bang Boom Boom"	—	—	—	—	Bang Bang Boom Boom
2013	"Better Man"	—	—	—	—	Bang Bang Boom Boom
2013	"Thru the Window of My Mind"	—	—	—	—	Bang Bang Boom Boom
2013	"Miss Lady" (with Joe Bonamassa)	—	—	—	—	Seesaw
2013	"I Love You More Than You'll Ever Know" (with Joe Bonamassa)	—	—	—	—	Seesaw
2013	"Close to My Fire" (with Joe Bonamassa)	—	—	—	—	Seesaw
2013	"Them There Eyes" (with Joe Bonamassa)	—	—	—	—	Seesaw
2015	"Mechanical Heart"	—	—	—	—	Better Than Home
2015	"Tell Her You Belong to Me"	—	—	—	—	Better Than Home
2015	"The Mood That I'm In"	—	—	—	—	Better Than Home
2016	"Mama This One's for You"	—	—	—	—	Better Than Home
2016	"Fire on the Floor"	—	—	—	—	Fire on the Floor
2016	"Love Is a Lie"	—	—	—	—	Fire on the Floor
2017	"Tell Her You Belong to Me" (featuring Jeff Beck)	—	—	—	—	Fire on the Floor
2017	"Jazz Man"	—	—	—	—	Fire on the Floor
2017	"Let's Get Together"	—	—	—	—	Fire on the Floor
2017	"Black Coffee" (with Joe Bonamassa)	—	—	—	—	Black Coffee
"—" denotes a release that did not chart or was not issued in that region.

== Video albums ==
Year	Album details	Peak chart positions			
Year	Album details	NLD	SWE	FIN	DEN
2005	Live at Paradiso: Released: September 6, 2005; Label: Universal Music; Formats: DVD	—	—	—	—
2014	Live in Amsterdam (with Joe Bonamassa): Released: 24 March 2014; Label: J&R Adventures; Formats: 2-DVD, Blu-ray	1	2	2	2
2018	Live at the Royal Albert Hall: Released: November 30, 2018; Label: Provogue/Mascot Records; Formats: DVD, Blu-ray, digital	—	—	—	—
