= Gabrielle Daleman =

Canadian figure skater (born 1998)

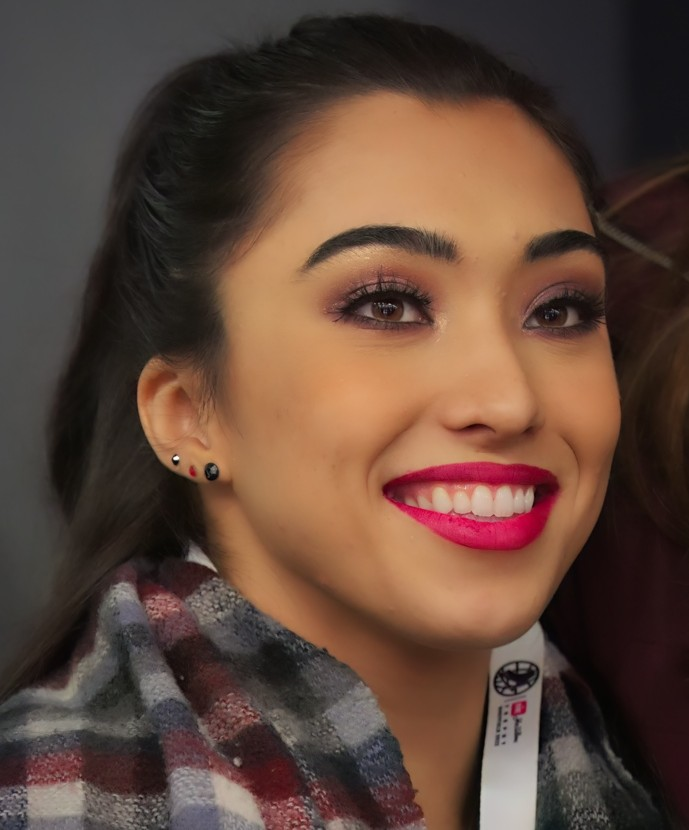
- Gabrielle Daleman in 2022

Personal information
- Born: January 13, 1998 (age 28) Toronto, Ontario, Canada
- Home town: Barrie, Ontario
- Height: 1.55 m (5 ft 1 in)

Figure skating career
- Country: Canada
- Discipline: Women's singles
- Coach: Michael Hopfes; Tammy Gambill
- Skating club: Mariposa School of Skating
- Began skating: 2002
- Highest WS: 10th (2017–18)

Medal record
Event	Gold medal – first place	Silver medal – second place	Bronze medal – third place
Olympic Games	1	0	0
World Championships	0	0	1
Four Continents Championships	0	1	0
Canadian Championships	2	5	1
World Team Trophy	0	1	0
Medal list
Olympic Games
Gold medal – first place	2018 Pyeongchang	Team
World Championships
Bronze medal – third place	2017 Helsinki	Singles
Four Continents Championships
Silver medal – second place	2017 Gangneung	Singles
Canadian Championships
Gold medal – first place	2015 Kingston	Singles
Gold medal – first place	2018 Vancouver	Singles
Silver medal – second place	2013 Mississauga	Singles
Silver medal – second place	2014 Ottawa	Singles
Silver medal – second place	2016 Halifax	Singles
Silver medal – second place	2017 Ottawa	Singles
Silver medal – second place	2026 Gatineau	Singles
Bronze medal – third place	2022 Ottawa	Singles
World Team Trophy
Silver medal – second place	2013 Tokyo	Team

Gabrielle Daleman (born January 13, 1998) is a Canadian figure skater. She is a 2018 Olympic gold medalist in the team event, the 2017 World bronze medalist, 2017 Four Continents silver medalist, 2014 CS Autumn Classic champion, and two-time Canadian national champion (2015, 2018). She represented Canada at the 2014 Winter Olympics in Sochi and at the 2018 Winter Olympics in Pyeongchang.

== Early life and education ==
Gabrielle Daleman was born January 13, 1998, in Toronto, Ontario, Canada, to Rhonda and Michael Daleman. She is of Ukrainian, German, Dutch, English, and Irish descent. Her younger brother, Zack, is also a competitive figure skater.

Daleman previously attended Pickering College, where her father has also taught.

She has attention deficit hyperactivity disorder and a learning disability affecting her ability to read and write. Daleman has also spoken about an eating disorder which she had from Grade 5 or 6 until after the 2014 Winter Olympics.

== Career ==
=== Early years ===
Daleman began skating as a four-year-old, at the Aurora Skating Club. Her motivation grew after watching Joannie Rochette compete at the 2006 Winter Olympics.

Daleman won the junior ladies title at the 2012 Canadian Championships.

=== 2012–2013 season: National silver medallist ===
Daleman debuted on the ISU Junior Grand Prix series in the autumn of 2012. At the 2013 Canadian Championships, she won the silver medal behind Kaetlyn Osmond. She was sent to the 2013 World Junior Championships and finished sixth.

=== 2013–2014 season: Sochi Olympics ===
Daleman continued on the JGP series, winning the bronze medal at her event in Poland. In January 2014, after repeating as national silver medallist at the Canadian Championships, she was named in Canada's team to the 2014 Winter Olympics in Sochi in February. At 16 years of age, she was the youngest athlete on the Canadian Olympic team. Daleman was not assigned to the team event, in which Canada won the silver medal, but she did compete in the individual event and finished in seventeenth place.

Around February 2014, she developed a stress reaction (a precursor to a stress fracture) and plantar fasciitis in her right foot.

=== 2014–2015 season: First national title ===
Daleman began her season with a win at the 2014 Skate Canada Autumn Classic, an ISU Challenger Series event. Making her senior Grand Prix debut, she placed fifth at the 2014 Cup of China and sixth at the 2014 NHK Trophy. Competing with a strep throat at the 2015 Canadian Championships, she placed first in the short program and second in the free skate. Daleman won the national title by a margin of 1.78 points over Alaine Chartrand. She finished seventh at the 2015 Four Continents Championships, 21st at the 2015 World Championships in Shanghai, and 8th at the 2015 World Team Trophy.

In the spring of 2015, Daleman parted ways with her longtime coaches – Andrei Berezintsev and Inga Zusev – and moved from Richmond Hill, Ontario to Toronto to train at the Toronto Cricket, Skating and Curling Club under Lee Barkell (as her main coach), Brian Orser, and Tracy Wilson.

=== 2015–2016 season ===
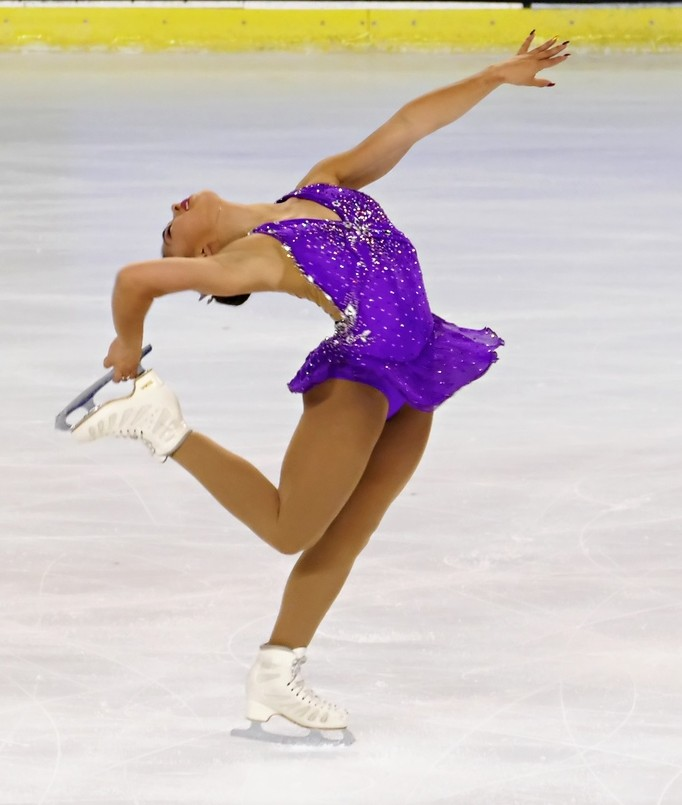
Daleman performing a catch foot layback spin at the 2015 Trophée Éric Bompard

Daleman started the 2015–2016 season on the Challenger Series (CS), finishing fourth at the 2015 Ondrej Nepela Trophy. Competing on the Grand Prix series, she placed fifth at the 2015 Skate Canada International and sixth at the 2015 Trophée Éric Bompard. She won the silver medal at the 2016 Canadian Championships in Halifax, Nova Scotia, finishing behind Alaine Chartrand and ahead of Kaetlyn Osmond. Soon after the event, she experienced severe swelling due to arthritis and tendinitis in her right foot. On her treatment, she said, "I was probably in physio six, seven days a week for about three hours doing exercises, heating, icing, everything I could. I hate needles, but I was doing acupuncture to get the swelling out."

Daleman decided to withdraw from the 2016 Four Continents Championships as a precaution. In March, she competed at the 2016 World Championships in Boston. She received personal best scores in the short, free, and total scores, landing her in the top ten for the first time. In the 2015–16 season, Daleman adjusted several aspects of her training and preparation – to practice elements with the same entry and exit as in her programs, improve the precision and timing of her in-between movements, and work more regularly with a mental performance consultant for athletes.

=== 2016–2017 season: World bronze medallist ===
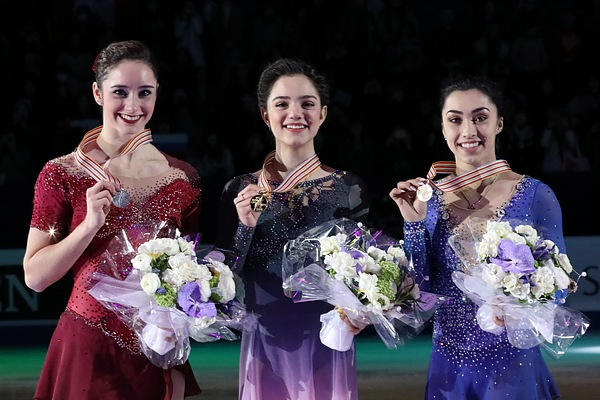
2017 World Figure Skating Championships. From left: Kaetlyn Osmond, Evgenia Medvedeva, Gabrielle Daleman.

Daleman began the season by taking the bronze medal at the 2016 CS Nebelhorn Trophy, behind Mai Mihara and Elizaveta Tuktamysheva, before appearing in her third Grand Prix series. She finished fourth, 2.65 points off the podium, at the 2016 Skate America in Chicago, ranking fourth in both segments. At her next GP event, the 2016 Trophée de France in Paris, she placed second in the short program, sixth in the free skate, and fourth overall.

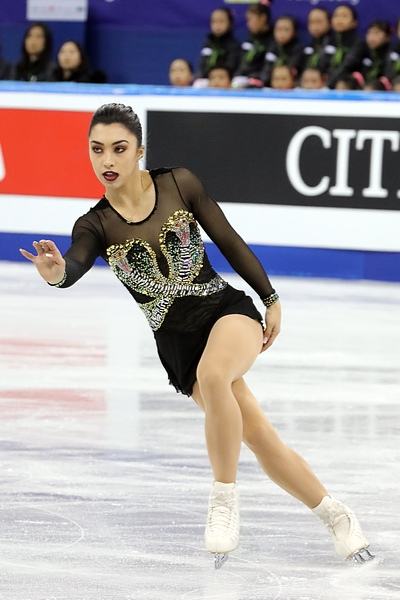
Daleman at the 2017 Four Continents Championships

In January 2017, Daleman won the silver medal at the 2017 Canadian Championships, finishing second to Kaetlyn Osmond with a deficit of 8.57 points.

In February, she ranked first in the short and third in the free skate at the 2017 Four Continents Championships in Gangneung, South Korea. Finishing 3.94 points behind Japan's Mai Mihara, she won the silver medal, becoming the first Canadian ladies' single skater to land on the podium at Four Continents since 2009, when Joannie Rochette also obtained silver.

In March, Daleman won the bronze medal at the 2017 World Championships in Helsinki, Finland. The same month, she was found to have two abdominal cysts, one of which ruptured. She was treated before Worlds but later had more problems and underwent surgery on May 20, 2017.

=== 2017–2018 season: Pyeongchang Olympics ===
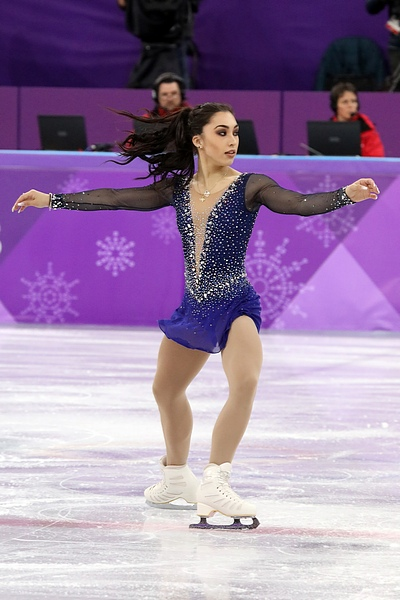
Daleman at the 2018 Winter Olympics

In early November, Daleman finished sixth at the 2017 Cup of China after winning the short program and placing seventh in the free skate. She competed with a kidney infection in China and a viral infection at the 2017 Skate America later the same month. She had the same final placement at the 2017 Skate America after placing third in the short and eighth in the free.

Competing with pneumonia, Daleman placed first at the 2018 Canadian Championships in January. She competed at the 2018 Winter Olympics, where she helped Canada win the gold medal in the team event. In the individual event, Daleman placed seventh in the short program. Daleman's free skate proved difficult, characterized by The Toronto Star as "a shambles" that featured "three falls, two over-rotations, a doubled-down triple" and "an agonizingly slow camel spin." She placed nineteenth in the free skate, dropping to fifteenth place overall.

Daleman finished her season at the World Championships in Milan. She placed sixth in the short program, which she viewed as a redemptive skate following her trouble in Pyeongchang. However, she then injured her ankle on the morning of the free skate, where she struggled and placed eighth, leading to a seventh place finish in the event.

=== 2018–2019 season ===
Daleman fell and hit her head during training before her first event of the season, the 2018 CS U.S. International Classic; she did not report the incident, believing that she was not injured. She finished sixth at the event. After returning to Toronto, she developed a series of health problems – including pneumonia, strep throat, anxiety, depression, a severe headache, and blurry vision – then collapsed and lost consciousness for a few seconds while at home; a doctor attributed this fall to a concussion, which most likely occurred when she hit her head before the U.S. competition.

On October 12, 2018, Skate Canada announced that Daleman had withdrawn from the 2018 Skate Canada International and taken a break from training to focus on her mental health. She subsequently withdrew as well from her second Grand Prix assignment, the 2018 NHK Trophy. On December 24, 2018, she announced that she intended to defend her national title at the 2019 Canadian Championships.

Returning to competition, Daleman placed first in the short program at the Canadian Championships, declining to speak to the media until the event was over in order to manage her mental health. She fared poorly in the free program, placing eighth, and finishing in fifth place overall, her lowest-ever result at senior nationals. Speaking afterwards, Daleman called the performance "honestly crap." She went on to say, "it was a victory to be out here and actually have the courage to put myself out here", "but definitely, this is going to take me a few steps back to where I was because I was building up confidence. This is going to set me back a bit, but this is a long journey ahead of me."

On February 22, Skate Canada named Daleman to the Canadian team for the 2019 World Championships in Saitama. Daleman placed eleventh in the short program, skating cleanly but for a slightly negative Grade of Execution on her triple Lutz. In the free skate, she placed twelfth but remained in eleventh place overall. This result, combined with that of Alaine Chartrand, preserved Canada's second spot for the 2020 World Championships to be held in Montreal. Daleman commented afterwards that despite multiple jump errors in the free skate, she was pleased with how the event had gone, saying, "I had the worst two years of my life and to be here and get a top-12 finish means the world to me."

In her final event of the season, Daleman competed as part of the Canadian team at the 2019 World Team Trophy in Fukuoka. She placed seventh in the short program after singling her planned triple Lutz. In the warm-up for the free skate, Daleman collided with French skater Laurine Lecavelier. She went on to skate the free, placing tenth after multiple falls, but discovered upon returning home that she had cracked two ribs and sustained another concussion and a serious bruise on her knee that necessitated using a cane.

=== 2019–2020 season ===
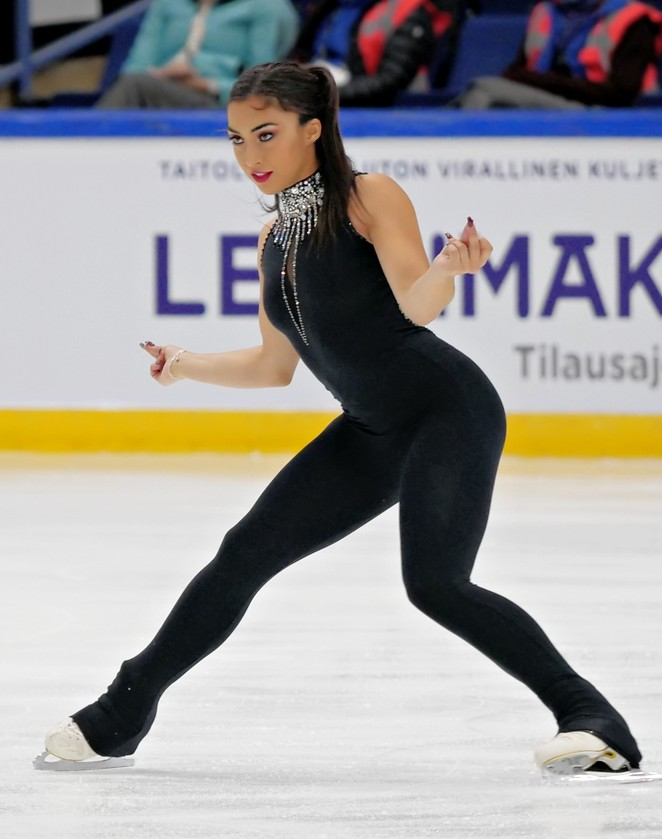
Daleman performing her short program at the 2019 CS Finlandia Trophy

After several months of recuperation, Daleman returned to competition at the 2019 CS Finlandia Trophy. She struggled in both programs, placing thirteenth overall, but expressed pride at the result, saying, "came here to compete, and it was just a stepping stone." Two weeks later, Daleman competed at 2019 Skate Canada International, placing fifth in the short program with only a minor error on her triple flip. She dropped to tenth place following a free skate where she fell four times.

After withdrawing from the Cup of China, Daleman tore two ligaments in her ankle and strained her Achilles tendon, necessitating over a month spent off the ice. Shortly before the 2020 Canadian Championships, she reported having contracted pneumonia. She placed eighth at the championships after struggling in both segments. Daleman commented afterward that the preceding two seasons had been challenging, but that it would not "stop me from continuing to do what I love most."

=== 2020–2021 season ===
In the summer, Daleman competed in the Miss World Canada pageant process, winning the title of Miss Ontario. However, in October, she withdrew from the pageant, stating that she wanted to focus exclusively on skating.

With the COVID-19 pandemic severely curtailing the figure skating season, fall international assignments were unavailable to Canadian skaters, and domestic competitions were not held in person. The 2021 Skate Canada Challenge, the main qualifier for the national championships, was held virtually. Daleman placed third in the short program and second in the free skate, taking the bronze medal.

Daleman was named as an alternate to the 2021 World Championships, the two ladies' berths going to Madeline Schizas and Emily Bausback. With Canada's mandatory two-week quarantine for returning athletes, however, no member of the World team was assigned to the 2021 World Team Trophy, and Daleman was assigned as one of Canada's two ladies' entries, alongside Alison Schumacher. Daleman finished tenth in both segments of the competition, while Team Canada finished in sixth place overall.

=== 2021–2022 season ===
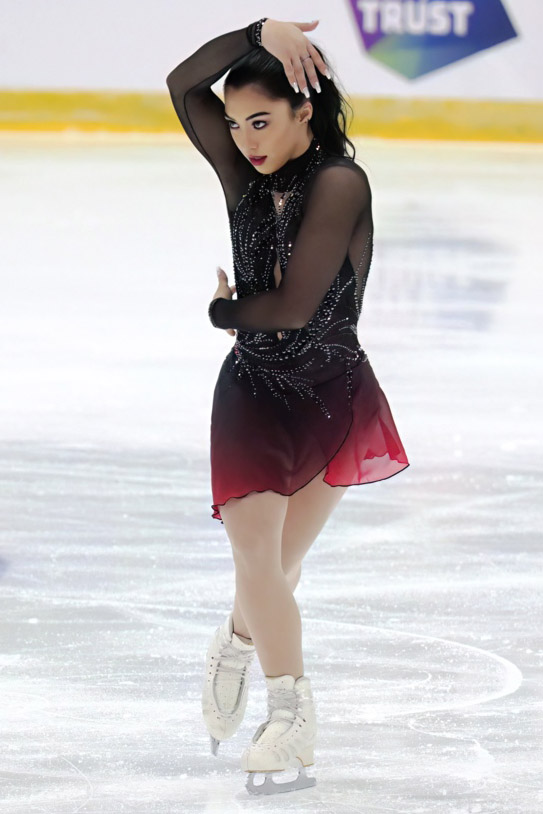
Daleman performing her free skate at the 2022 MK John Wilson Trophy

Daleman began the season at the 2021 CS Autumn Classic International, where she placed eighth. She was later given a second Challenger assignment, the 2021 CS Warsaw Cup, finishing seventh. Domestically she was second at the Ontario Sectionals and won the 2022 Skate Canada Challenge to qualify for the national championships.

Despite numerous jump errors, Daleman won the bronze medal at the 2022 Canadian Championships, placing third in both segments of the competition. This was her first appearance on the national podium since 2018. Speaking afterwards, she called the result "heart-shattering," feeling it did not measure up at all to what she was capable of doing in practices prior. Daleman was assigned to the 2022 Four Continents Championships, finishing in tenth place.

=== 2022–2023 season ===
During the summer, Daleman was in a car accident, which lead to her sustaining a back injury. Due to this, she withdrew from the Challenger series. She subsequently made her season debut at the 2022 Skate Canada International, where she unexpectedly finished second in the short program, behind only fellow Canadian Madeline Schizas. However, she dropped to tenth overall following an eleventh-place free skate. She was later called on to replace Belgian skater, Nina Pinzarrone, at the 2022 MK John Wilson Trophy and finished the event in eighth place.

Following the Grand Prix series, Daleman injured her ankle and as a result, had to undergo surgery thus ending her competitive season.

=== 2023–25: Hiatus ===
Due to complications from her ankle surgery, Daleman's recovery was further elongated leading to her missing the 2023–24 figure skating season.

After being cleared to compete again, Daleman returned to domestic competition during the fall of 2024. However, during this time, Daleman's recovered ankle snapped after taking a hard fall. This injury required her to undergo ankle surgery for a second time. Whilst recovering, Daleman met and connected with Barrie-based figure skating coach, Michael Hopfes, who agreed to become her new coach.

=== 2025–26 season: Comeback ===
In June 2025, Daleman moved her training base to the Broadmoor World Arena in Colorado Springs, Colorado to train alongside longtime friend, Amber Glenn; with Tammy Gambill joining Daleman's coaching team and Michael Hopfes continuing to act as her head coach.

Making her return to international competition after three years, Daleman made her return to international competition at the 2025 Ice Challenge in late fall, where she won the gold medal. She then went on to win gold at the 2025 Skate Canada Challenge.

In January, Daleman won the silver medal at the 2026 Canadian Championships behind Madeline Schizas. "It was great competition," said Daleman following the event. "She (Schizas) killed it. She knocked it out the park, well deserved. And I’m honored to compete against Maddie again and be back at Nationals. At the end of the day, I’m very proud of myself."

At the 2026 Four Continents Championships, she finished the event in 7th overall.

=== 2026–27 season ===
During the off season Daleman shared via Instagram that the 2026–27 would be her final competitive season in the singles discipline, hinting at the potential of changing disciplines in the future.

Daleman opened her season at the 2026 Nepela Memorial, concluding the event in fifth place overall. Following her free skate, viewers noticed that Daleman had input a planned quadruple toeloop jump into her planned program content, Daleman commented on this explaining; "It will be there. It wasn't ready for this competition but it's something I have been working on and hope to get it in (perform it) at some point during the season."

Subsequently, Daleman made her return to the Grand Prix series at the 2026 Grand Prix de France where she placed tenth overall.

== Programs ==
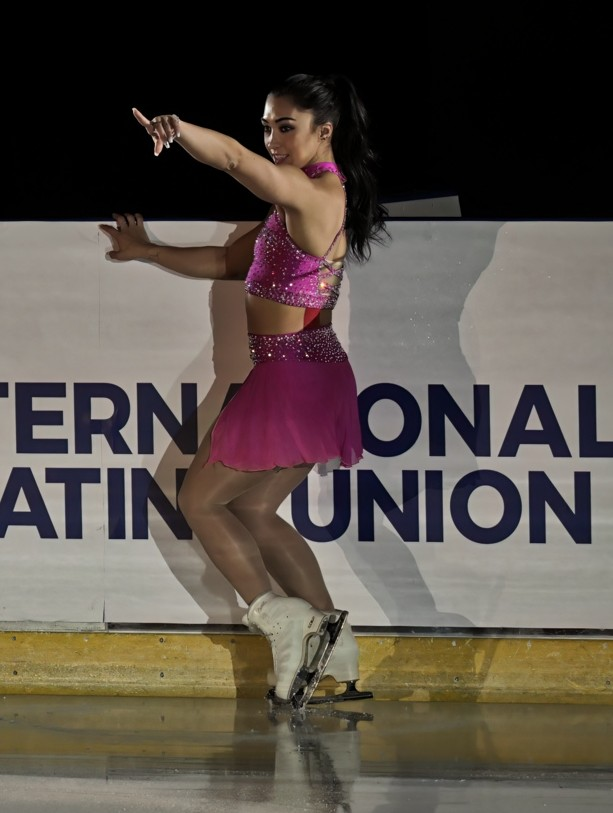
Daleman performing her exhibition program at the 2022 MK John Wilson Trophy

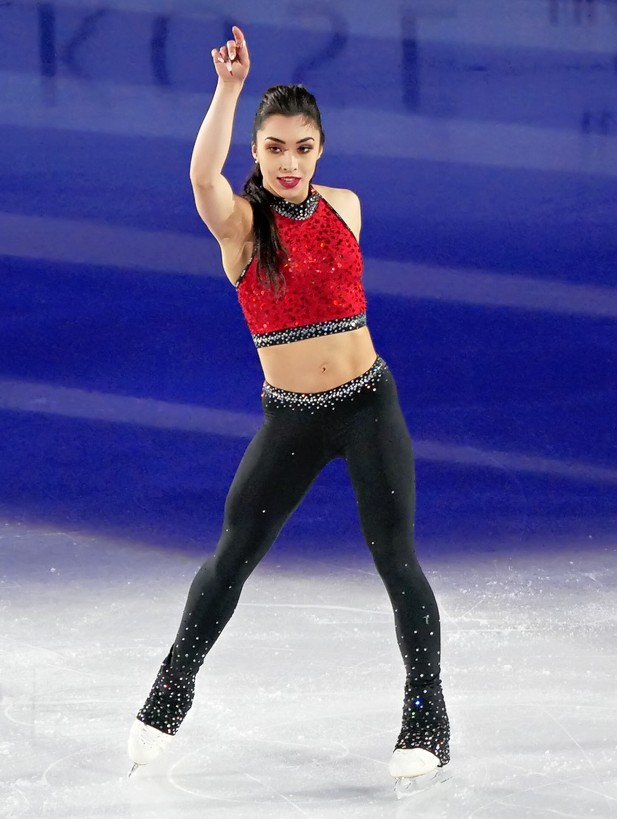
Daleman performing her exhibition program at the 2017 World Championships

	Short program	Free skating	Exhibition
2026–2027	Amor Congelado by District 78; El Tango de Roxanne (from Moulin Rouge!) performed by Baz Luhrmann, Ewan McGregor, José Feliciano, Jacek Koman, Sting, & Mariano Mores choreo. by Jeffrey Buttle; I Am Here by Pink choreo. by Kaitlyn Weaver	Gods of Egypt by Marco Beltrami, Pete Anthony choreo. by Lori Nichol	
2025–2026	Amor Congelado by District 78; El Tango de Roxanne (from Moulin Rouge!) performed by Baz Luhrmann, Ewan McGregor, José Feliciano, Jacek Koman, Sting, & Mariano Mores choreo. by Jeffrey Buttle; I Am Here by Pink choreo. by Kaitlyn Weaver	Samson and Delilah by Camille Saint-Saëns; Mon cœur s'ouvre à ta voix performed by Sissel; Bacchanale performed by Silvio Varviso & Staatskapelle Dresden choreo. by Lori Nichol	
2022–2023	Diamonds by Rihanna choreo. by Jeffrey Buttle	Tzigane, M. 76 by Maurice Ravel; Variations on Dark Eyes by Lara St. John and Ilan Rechtman choreo. by David Wilson	Break Free by Ariana Grande & Zedd
2021–2022	Libertango by Astor Piazzolla performed by Luis Bacalov choreo. by Jeffrey Buttle	Samson and Delilah by Camille Saint-Saëns; Mon cœur s'ouvre à ta voix performed by Sissel; Bacchanale performed by Silvio Varviso & Staatskapelle Dresden choreo. by Lori Nichol	
2020–2021	Habanera (from Carmen) by Georges Bizet performed by Filippa Giordano choreo. by Lori Nichol; Jazz Man by Beth Hart choreo. by Lori Nichol	Samson and Delilah by Camille Saint-Saëns; Mon cœur s'ouvre à ta voix performed by Sissel; Bacchanale performed by Silvio Varviso & Staatskapelle Dresden choreo. by Lori Nichol; It's All Coming Back to Me Now by Celine Dion choreo. by Lori Nichol	
2019–2020	Jazz Man by Beth Hart choreo. by Lori Nichol	It's All Coming Back to Me Now by Celine Dion choreo. by Lori Nichol	
2018–2019	Habanera (from Carmen) by Georges Bizet performed by Filippa Giordano choreo. by Lori Nichol	Bacchanale (from Samson and Delilah) by Camille Saint-Saëns choreo. by Lori Nichol	
2017–2018	Habanera (from Carmen) by Georges Bizet performed by Filippa Giordano choreo. by Lori Nichol	Rhapsody in Blue by George Gershwin choreo. by Lori Nichol; Gladiator Rhapsody (from Gladiator) by Lang Lang and Hans Zimmer choreo. by Lori Nichol	Habanera by Georges Bizet performed by Filippa Giordano choreo. by Lori Nichol; I Have Nothing by David Foster, Linda Thompson performed by Whitney Houston; Save the Last Dance for Me by Doc Pomus, Mort Shuman covered by Michael Bublé; Confident by Demi Lovato
2016–2017	Hérodiade; Acte IV Prelude; Scene XIV Ballet Finale by Jules Massenet choreo. by Lori Nichol	Rhapsody in Blue by George Gershwin choreo. by Lori Nichol	Gold by Frank Wildhorn, Nan Knighton performed by Linda Eder; Confident by Demi Lovato; Skyfall by Adele
2015–2016	(If You Can't Sing It) You'll Have to Swing It (Mr. Paganini) by Sam Coslow performed by Nikki Yanofsky choreo. by Lori Nichol	María de Buenos Aires; Tema de María; Yo Soy María by Astor Piazzolla choreo. by Lori Nichol	Break Free by Ariana Grande & Zedd
2014–2015	Winter 3 (from The Four Seasons) by Antonio Vivaldi arranged by Max Richter; Art on Ice by Edvin Marton; Allegro Lento (from Concerto in F Minor, Winter) by Antonio Vivaldi choreo. by Lori Nichol	En Aranjuez con tu amor by Joaquín Rodrigo choreo. by Lori Nichol	Pure Imagination (from Glee) performed by cast of Glee; Don't Rain on My Parade (from Glee) performed by Lea Michele
2013–2014	Cancion Triste by Jesse Cook; Angelica performed by Rodrigo y Gabriela	Polovtsian Dances (from Prince Igor); Notturno by Alexander Borodin	
2012–2013	Avatar by James Horner	Piano Trio Opus 90 Dumky by Antonín Dvořák	

== Competitive highlights ==
- GP – Event of the ISU Grand Prix Series
- CS – Event of the ISU Challenger Series
- TBD – Assigned
- WD – Withdrew from competition
- C – Cancelled
- Medals at team events are awarded for the team results only. Individual placements at team events are listed in parentheses.

Competition placements at senior level
Season	2012–13	2013–14	2014–15	2015–16	2016–17	2017–18	2018–19	2019–20	2020–21	2021–22	2022–23	2025–26	2026-27
Winter Olympics		17th				15th							
Winter Olympics (Team event)						1st							
World Championships		13th	21st	9th	3rd	7th	11th						
Four Continents Championships			7th	WD	2nd					10th		7th	
Canadian Championships	2nd	2nd	1st	2nd	2nd	1st	5th	8th	C	3rd	WD	2nd	
World Team Trophy	2nd (11th)		4th (8th)		4th (4th)		5th (9th)		6th (10th)				
GP Cup of China			5th			6th		WD					
GP France				6th	4th								10th
GP NHK Trophy			6th				WD						
GP Skate America					4th	6th							
GP Skate Canada				5th			WD	10th			10th		
GP Wilson Trophy											8th		
CS Autumn Classic			1st					WD		8th			
CS Finlandia Trophy						6th		13th					
CS Nebelhorn Trophy					3rd								
CS Nepela Memorial				4th									5th
CS U.S. Classic							6th						
CS Warsaw Cup										7th			
CS Tallinn Trophy													23rd
Skate Canada Challenge	3rd			1st	1st	WD			3rd	1st		1st	
Team Challenge Cup				1st (8th)									
Ice Challenge												1st	

Competition placements at junior level
Season	2011–12	2012–13	2013–14
World Junior Championships		6th	
Canadian Championships	1st		
JGP Austria		6th	
JGP Estonia			4th
JGP Germany		5th	
JGP Poland			3rd
Skate Canada Challenge	3rd		
Challenge Cup	2nd		

== Detailed results ==
ISU personal best scores in the +5/-5 GOE System
Segment	Type	Score	Event
Total	TSS	192.67	2019 World Championships
Short program	TSS	69.19	2019 World Championships
Short program	TES	37.01	2026 Four Continents Championships
Short program	PCS	33.06	2019 World Team Trophy
Free skating	TSS	123.48	2019 World Championships
Free skating	TES	60.26	2019 World Championships
Free skating	PCS	64.22	2019 World Championships

ISU personal best scores in the +3/-3 GOE System
Segment	Type	Score	Event
Total	TSS	214.15	2017 World Team Trophy
Short program	TSS	72.70	2016 Grand Prix de France
Short program	TES	39.35	2016 Grand Prix de France
Short program	PCS	34.26	2018 World Championships
Free skating	TSS	142.41	2017 World Team Trophy
Free skating	TES	71.78	2017 World Team Trophy
Free skating	PCS	70.63	2017 World Team Trophy

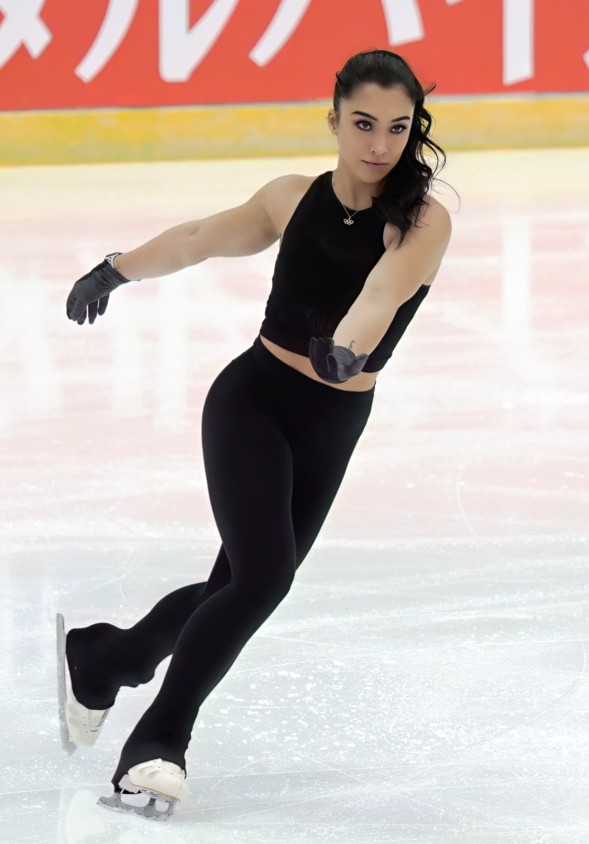
Daleman during practice at the 2022 MK John Wilson Trophy

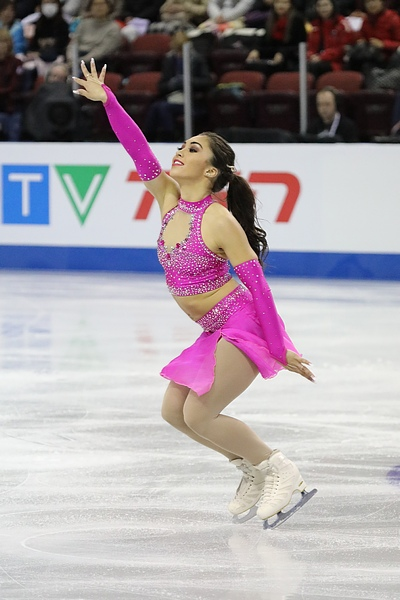
Daleman at 2019 Skate Canada International

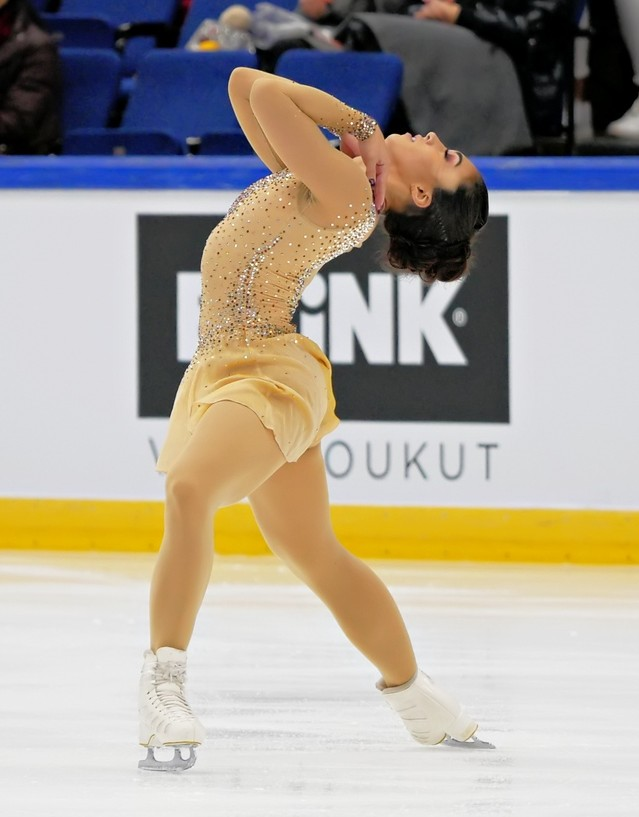
Daleman performing an Ina Bauer during her free skate at the 2019 CS Finlandia Trophy

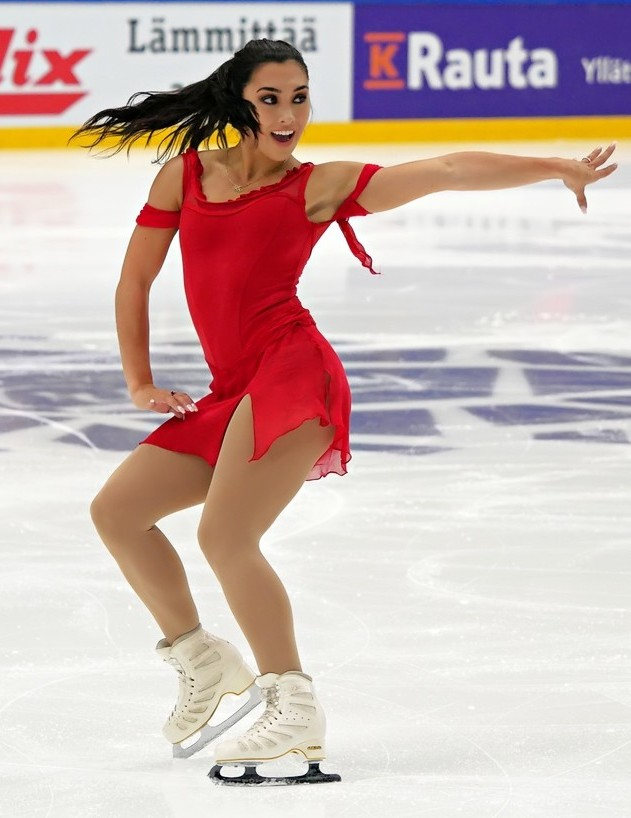
Daleman at the 2017 CS Finlandia Trophy

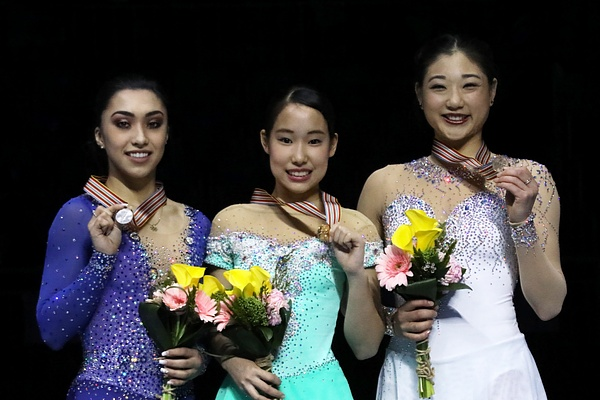
Daleman (left) with Mai Mihara (center) and Mirai Nagasu (right) at the 2017 Four Continents podium

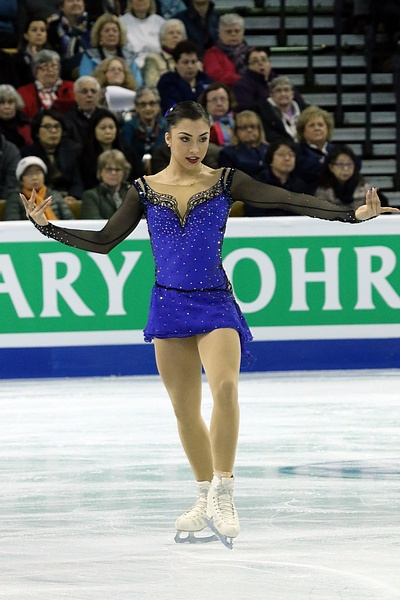
Daleman at the 2016 World Championships

=== Senior level ===
Small medals for short and free programs awarded only at ISU Championships. At team events, medals awarded for team results only.

Results in the 2026–27 season
Date	Event	SP		FS		Total	
Date	Event	P	Score	P	Score	P	Score
Sep 24–27, 2026	(Slovakia) 2026 CS Nepela Memorial	6	59.72	5	106.97	5	166.69
Oct 23–25, 2026	2026 Grand Prix de France	11	55.66	9	100.56	10	156.22
Nov 16–22, 2026	(Estonia) 2026 CS Tallinn Trophy	27	41.45	15	98.02	23	139.47

Results in the 2025–26 season
Date	Event	SP		FS		Total	
Date	Event	P	Score	P	Score	P	Score
Nov 5–9, 2025	(Austria) 2025 Ice Challenge	1	63.17	1	117.87	1	181.04
Nov 27–29, 2025	2025 Skate Canada Challenge	3	61.46	2	115.81	1	177.27
Jan 5–11, 2026	(Canada) 2026 Canadian Championships	2	66.32	2	129.03	2	195.35
Jan 21-25, 2026	(China) 2026 Four Continents Championships	4	67.69	10	115.78	7	183.47

2022–23 season
Date	Event	SP	FS	Total
November 11–13, 2022	2022 MK John Wilson Trophy	8; 58.95	8; 104.82	8; 163.77
October 28–30, 2022	2022 Skate Canada International	2; 66.65	11; 104.96	10; 171.61
2021–22 season
Date	Event	SP	FS	Total
January 18–23, 2022	2022 Four Continents Championships	9; 59.01	9; 113.97	10; 172.98
January 6–12, 2022	2022 Canadian Championships	3; 58.48	3; 109.02	3; 167.50
November 17–20, 2021	2021 CS Warsaw Cup	5; 61.57	7; 115.17	7; 176.74
September 16–18, 2021	2021 CS Autumn Classic International	8; 51.84	8; 94.67	8; 146.51
2020–21 season
Date	Event	SP	FS	Total
April 15–18, 2021	2021 World Team Trophy	10; 57.22	10; 107.30	6T/10P; 164.52
January 8–17, 2021	2021 Skate Canada Challenge	3; 57.80	2; 107.86	3; 165.66
2019–20 season
Date	Event	SP	FS	Total
January 13–19, 2020	2020 Canadian Championships	3; 59.51	13; 86.17	8; 145.68
October 25–27, 2019	2019 Skate Canada International	5; 63.94	11; 100.40	10; 164.34
October 11–13, 2019	2019 CS Finlandia Trophy	15; 45.82	11; 93.07	13; 136.89
2018–19 season
Date	Event	SP	FS	Total
April 11–14, 2019	2019 World Team Trophy	7; 64.33	10; 107.48	5T/9P; 171.85
March 18–24, 2019	2019 World Championships	11; 69.19	12; 123.48	11; 192.67
January 14–20, 2019	2019 Canadian Championships	1; 70.18	8; 96.74	5; 166.92
September 12–16, 2018	2018 CS U.S. International Classic	3; 63.28	7; 105.87	6; 169.15
2017–18 season
Date	Event	SP	FS	Total
March 21–23, 2018	2018 World Championships	6; 71.61	8; 125.11	7; 196.72
February 14–23, 2018	2018 Winter Olympics	7; 68.90	19; 103.56	15; 172.46
February 9–12, 2018	2018 Winter Olympics (Team event)	–	3; 137.14	1^{T}
January 8–14, 2018	2018 Canadian Championships	1; 77.88	1; 151.90	1; 229.78
November 24–26, 2017	2017 Skate America	3; 68.08	8; 121.06	6; 189.14
November 3–5, 2017	2017 Cup of China	1; 70.65	7; 126.18	6; 196.83
October 6–8, 2017	2017 CS Finlandia Trophy	5; 60.72	7; 114.11	6; 174.83
2016–17 season
Date	Event	SP	FS	Total
April 20–23, 2017	2017 World Team Trophy	4; 71.74	4; 142.41	4T/4P; 214.15
March 29 – April 2, 2017	2017 World Championships	3; 72.19	3; 141.33	3; 213.52
February 15–19, 2017	2017 Four Continents Championships	1; 68.25	3; 128.66	2; 196.91
January 16–22, 2017	2017 Canadian Championships	2; 75.04	2; 136.05	2; 211.09
November 11–13, 2016	2016 Trophée de France	2; 72.70	6; 119.40	4; 192.10
October 21–23, 2016	2016 Skate America	4; 64.49	4; 122.14	4; 186.63
September 22–24, 2016	2016 CS Nebelhorn Trophy	3; 60.15	3; 115.25	3; 175.40
2015–16 season
Date	Event	SP	FS	Total
April 22–24, 2016	2016 Team Challenge Cup	5; 68.45	8; 115.93	1T/8P
March 28 – April 3, 2016	2016 World Championships	8; 67.38	9; 128.30	9; 195.68
January 18–24, 2016	2016 Canadian Championships	3; 64.44	1; 133.55	2; 197.99
November 13–15, 2015	2015 Trophée Éric Bompard	6; 55.35	–	6
October 30 – November 1, 2015	2015 Skate Canada International	8; 54.13	3; 116.20	5; 170.33
October 1–3, 2015	2015 CS Ondrej Nepela Trophy	4; 60.76	4; 110.96	4; 171.72
2014–15 season
Date	Event	SP	FS	Total
April 16–19, 2015	2015 World Team Trophy	8; 57.59	8; 98.87	4T/8P; 156.46
March 23–29, 2015	2015 World Championships	21; 48.13	20; 85.44	21; 133.57
February 9–15, 2015	2015 Four Continents Championships	8; 55.25	6; 111.84	7; 167.09
January 19–25, 2015	2015 Canadian Championships	1; 62.91	2; 123.11	1; 186.02
November 28–30, 2014	2014 NHK Trophy	7; 53.46	6; 111.28	6; 164.74
November 7–9, 2014	2014 Cup of China	4; 58.49	5; 102.77	5; 161.26
October 15–16, 2014	2014 CS Autumn Classic	1; 59.38	2; 106.21	1; 165.59
2013–14 season
Date	Event	SP	FS	Total
March 24–30, 2014	2014 World Championships	14; 55.72	11; 109.06	13; 164.78
February 6–22, 2014	2014 Winter Olympics	19; 52.61	16; 95.83	17; 148.44
January 9–15, 2014	2014 Canadian Championships	3; 58.38	2; 124.09	2; 182.47

=== Junior level ===
At team events, medals awarded for team results only.

2013–14 season
Date	Event	Level	SP	FS	Total
October 9–12, 2013	2013 JGP Estonia	Junior	5; 51.62	4; 96.27	4; 147.89
September 18–21, 2013	2013 JGP Poland	Junior	5; 46.77	3; 101.52	3; 148.29
2012–13 season
Date	Event	Level	SP	FS	Total
April 11–14, 2013	2013 World Team Trophy	Senior	12; 48.82	11; 92.00	2T/11P; 140.82
February 25 – March 3, 2013	2013 World Junior Championships	Junior	8; 50.70	6; 98.69	6; 149.39
January 13–20, 2013	2013 Canadian Championships	Senior	5; 51.80	2; 112.10	2; 163.90
October 10–13, 2012	2012 JGP Germany	Junior	4; 52.00	6; 86.33	5; 138.33
September 12–15, 2012	2012 JGP Austria	Junior	7; 48.55	5; 91.22	6; 139.77
2011–12 season
Date	Event	Level	SP	FS	Total
March 8–11, 2012	2012 International Challenge Cup	Junior	3; 47.06	2; 85.42	2; 132.48
January 16–22, 2012	2012 Canadian Junior Championships	Junior	1; 47.59	1; 82.98	1; 130.57
