= 37 Days =

37 Days may refer to:

- 37 Days (album), a 2007 album by Beth Hart
- 37 Days (TV series), a 2014 British drama miniseries
