= Sepahan Oil Company =

Sepahan Oil Company (SOC)
- Company type: Public Company
- Traded as: Shaspa
- Industry: Oil and gas
- Founded: 2002; 24 years ago
- Headquarters: Tehran, Iran
- Area served: Worldwide
- Key people: Mohamad Ebrahimi(Managing director (CEO))
- Products: Engine oil Base oil RPO; Slackwax; Paraffin wax, Petroleum; Natural gas; Motor fuels; Aviation fuels; Petrochemicals
- Website: sepahanoil.com

Sepahan Oil Company (SOC), established in 2002, is an oil refining independent company based in Tehran with its refining facilities located in Isfahan. In 2013, SOC began offering shares of stock on Tehran Stock Exchange. With the annual production capacity of more than 700,000 MT, SOC is now the largest producer of base oil in the Middle East. Under the brand name of Speedy, the company is one of the main producers of diesel and engine oils in the Mideast as well.

== Products ==
SOC's primary products include engine oil, industrial lubricant, automobile gear oil, grease and antifreeze, paraffin, and heavy slackwax, as well as base oil SN500.

== Certifications ==
The company has been awarded nationally and internationally. It has received Iran's Best Exporter of the Year Awards in 1383 (2004), 1386 (2007), 1390 (2011), 1391 (2012) and in 1393 (2014), as well as Iran Best Industrial Co. Award in 1383 (2004). It received the Golden Award for Quality & Business Prestige in 2007 (Geneva, Switzerland), a vanity award, as well as the "Golden Trophy for Quality -- New Millennium Award" in 2007 (Paris, France) and Premium Quality Award from the ICS Group in Canada in 2014 and the International Risk Control Academy's (IRCA's) two-star certificate for the year 2015-2016 as the first company in Iran. Nationally awarded for its environmentally-friendly activities in the Iranian calendar year of 1393 (2014), SOC has also been accredited by ISO 9001, ISO/TS 16949, OHSAS 18001, ISO/TS 29001, and ISO 14001 as well as ISO/IEC 17025. It has also succeeded for the first time to receive the Iranian national certificate for protecting consumers' rights in 2016.

Shareholder

1- Taban Farda Petrochemical Group Company - Public Joint Stock Company

2- Taban Farda Petrochemical Group Company - General Joint Stock Company

3- Taban Farda Investment Company

4- State Pension Fund Company - Public Joint Stock Company

5- Eurasian Economic Tadbirgaran Company

== See also ==
- Industry of Iran
- Privatization in Iran
- List of Iranian companies
- National Iranian Oil Company
