= Sinner's prayer (disambiguation) =

The sinner's prayer is an evangelical Christian term referring to any prayer of repentance.

Sinner's prayer may also refer to:

- "Sinner's Prayer", a song by Lowell Fulson and Lloyd Glenn, included in the Ray Charles Genius Loves Company album (2004)
- "Sinner's Prayer", a song by Lady Gaga from Joanne
- "Sinner's Prayer", a song by Beth Hart from Don't Explain
