= Live at Paradiso =

Live album by Beth Hart
- Released: 2005
- Genre: Rock
- Length: 74:07 (CD)
- Label: Universal
- Producer: Beth Hart

Beth Hart chronology
Leave the Light On (2003)	Live at Paradiso (2005)	37 Days (2007)

Professional ratings
Review scores
Source	Rating
Allmusic	4/5 stars

Live at Paradiso is a live album by American singer-songwriter Beth Hart, released in 2005 by Universal. It was recorded at a live performance at the music venue Paradiso in Amsterdam, the Netherlands. A DVD version is also available. The DVD contains 3 more songs. The album peaked No. 88 in the Netherlands.

== Track listing ==
=== CD ===
1. "Delicious Surprise" – 4:15
2. "Guilty" – 4:52
3. "Leave the Light on" – 4:42
4. "Lifts You Up" – 3:59
5. "Broken & Ugly" – 4:48
6. "Get Your Shit Together" – 5:56
7. "Immortal" – 7:07
8. "Monkey Back" – 5:37
9. "Am I the One" – 10:44
10. "Mama" – 4:25
11. "L.A. Song" – 4:31
12. "World Without You" – 5:17
13. "Whole Lotta Love" – 7:54

=== DVD ===
1. "Hiding Under Water"
2. "Delicious Surprise"
3. "Guilty"
4. "Leave the Light on"
5. "Lifts You Up"
6. "Broken & Ugly"
7. "Get Your Shit Together"
8. "Immortal"
9. "Lay Your Hands on Me"
10. "Monkey Back"
11. "Am I the One"
12. "Mama"
13. "L.A. Song"
14. "World Without You"
15. "Whole Lotta Love"

Bonus tracks

1. "Bonus 35 Minute Rockumentary"
2. "World Without You" (music video) – 4:03
3. "I Don't Need No Doctor" (extra live song) – 9:56

== Personnel ==
Musicians

- Beth Hart – guitar, piano, vocals
- Tom Lilly – bass guitar
- Jon Nichols – guitar
- John Nyman – drums

Production credits

- Mirko Cocco – Director, Video editor, producer
- Jeroen Bos – photography
- Hans Brethouwer – editing, mastering
- Hans Bunt – digital editing, editing, engineer, mastering, mixing
- Terk DeGroot – assistant engineer
- John Franck – executive producer
- Jeff Gilligan – design, package design
- Morten Rygaard – cover photo
- Anders Terlaack – photography
- David Wolff – executive producer
- Hay Zeelen – mastering
