= Live in Amsterdam (Beth Hart and Joe Bonamassa album) =

Live album by Beth Hart and Joe Bonamassa
- Released: March 24, 2014
- Recorded: June 30, 2013
- Venue: Carré Theatre, Amsterdam
- Genre: Blues rock
- Length: 107:32 (CDs)
- Label: J&R Adventures, Provogue
- Producer: Beth Hart

Beth Hart and Joe Bonamassa chronology
Seesaw (2013)	Live in Amsterdam (2014)	Black Coffee (2018)

Joe Bonamassa chronology
Seesaw (2013)	Live in Amsterdam (2014)	Tour de Force – Live from the Borderline (2014)

Beth Hart chronology
Seesaw (2013)	Live in Amsterdam (2014)	Better Than Home (2015)

Live in Amsterdam is a live album by Beth Hart and Joe Bonamassa. It was recorded during a live performance at the music venue Carré Theatre in Amsterdam, the Netherlands. A DVD version is also available. The album peaked at No. 49 in the United Kingdom and at No. 13 in the Netherlands.

Professional ratings
Review scores
Source	Rating
Allmusic	4/5 stars

== Track listing ==
=== CD 1 ===
No.	Title	Writer(s)	Original artist	Length
1.	"Amsterdam, Amsterdam!"	Joe Bonamassa, Beth Hart, Kevin Shirley		1:45
2.	"Them There Eyes"	Maceo Pinkard, Doris Tauber, William Tracey	Louis Armstrong	2:59
3.	"Sinner's Prayer"	Lowell Fulson, Lloyd Glenn	Ray Charles	4:21
4.	"Can't Let Go"	Randy Weeks	Lucinda Williams	5:12
5.	"For My Friends"	Bill Withers	Bill Withers	4:33
6.	"Close to My Fire"	Peter Hoppe, Stephanie Popp	Slackwax	5:30
7.	"Rhymes"	Al Green, Mabon "Teenie" Hodges	Al Green	5:05
8.	"Something's Got a Hold on Me"	Etta James, Leroy Kirkland, Pearl Woods	Etta James	6:18
9.	"Your Heart Is As Black As Night"	Melody Gardot	Melody Gardot	5:19
10.	"Chocolate Jesus"	Tom Waits, Kathleen Brennan	Tom Waits	2:51
11.	"Baddest Blues"	Hart	Beth Hart	5:09
12.	"Someday After a While (You'll Be Sorry)"	Freddie King, Sonny Thompson	John Mayall & the Bluesbreakers	6:04
Total length:				55:06

=== CD 2 ===
No.	Title	Writer(s)	Original artist	Length
1.	"Well, Well"	Delaney Bramlett	Delaney Bramlett & Bonnie Bramlett	4:51
2.	"If I Tell You I Love You"	Gardot	Melody Gardot	3:51
3.	"Seesaw"	Don Covay, Steve Cropper	Aretha Franklin	3:18
4.	"Strange Fruit"	Lewis Allen	Billie Holiday	5:58
5.	"Miss Lady"	Buddy Miles	Buddy Miles	4:00
6.	"I Love You More Than You'll Ever Know"	Al Kooper	Blood, Sweat & Tears	7:54
7.	"Nutbush City Limits"	Tina Turner	Ike & Tina Turner	3:49
8.	"I'd Rather Go Blind"	James, Ellington Jordan, Billy Foster	Etta James	10:01
9.	"Antwerp Jam"	Bonamassa, Hart, Shirley		5:25
Total length:				52:26

=== DVD ===
1. "Amsterdam, Amsterdam!"
2. "Them There Eyes"
3. "Sinner's Prayer"
4. "Can't Let Go"
5. "For My Friends"
6. "Close to My Fire"
7. "Rhymes"
8. "Something's Got a Hold on Me"
9. "Your Heart Is As Black As Night"
10. "Chocolate Jesus"
11. "Baddest Blues"
12. "Someday After Awhile (You'll Be Sorry)"
13. "Beth introduces the band"
14. "Well, Well"
15. "If I Tell You I Love You"
16. "See Saw"
17. "Strange Fruit"
18. "Miss Lady"
19. "I Love You More Than You'll Ever Know"
20. "Nutbush City Limits"
21. "I'd Rather Go Blind"
22. "Antwerp Jam" and credits

== Personnel ==
Musicians

- Beth Hart – vocals
- Joe Bonamassa – guitars
- Carmine Rojas – bass guitar
- Anton Fig – drums
- Blondie Chaplin – rhythm guitar
- Arlan Schierbaum – keyboards
- Lee Thornburg – brass instruments, brass arrangements
- Ron Dziubla – baritone saxophone
- Carlos Perez Alfonso – trombone

Production credits

- Kevin Shirley – producer
- Marcus Bird – photography and direction

== Certifications ==
Region	Certification	Certified units/sales
Poland (ZPAV)	Gold	10,000^{‡}
^{‡} Sales+streaming figures based on certification alone.
