= My California =

Studio album by Beth Hart
- Released: October 4, 2010 (Europe)
- Genre: Rock
- Length: 50:20
- Label: Mascot Records
- Producer: Rune Westberg

Beth Hart chronology
37 Days (2007)	My California (2010)	Don't Explain (2011)

Singles from My California
- 1. "Take It Easy On Me" Released: 2008; 2. "Sister Heroine (feat. Slash)" Released: February 03, 2010; 3. "Like You (And Everyone Else)" Released: May 10, 2010; 4. "Life Is Calling" Released: September 24, 2010

Professional ratings
Review scores
Source	Rating
DailyMusicGuide	4/5 stars
GetReadyToRock	3.5/5 stars

My California is the fifth studio album by Beth Hart, released in 2010. Hart worked with Danish producer Rune Westberg, who had already worked on Beth's previous albums 37 Days and Leave the Light On. Westberg challenged Hart not to "scream with animal savagery", not to rely on the power of her voice but rather on the power of emotions. This makes My California a unique album in Hart's discography, with a constancy throughout the tracks that the fans were not used to with the previous albums.

== Track listing ==
No.	Title	Writer(s)	Length
1.	"My California"	Beth Hart, Rune Westberg	4:35
2.	"Life Is Calling"	Westberg, Hart	3:51
3.	"Happiness...Any Day Now"	Tim Fagan, Westberg, Hart	4:22
4.	"Love Is the Hardest"	Westberg, Hart	3:44
5.	"Bad Love Is Good Enough"	Westberg, Hart	4:27
6.	"Drive"	Westberg, Hart	3:34
7.	"Sister Heroine" (featuring Slash)	Westberg, Hart	4:29
8.	"Take It Easy on Me"	Westberg, Hart	4:14
9.	"Like You (And Everyone Else)"	Westberg, Hart	4:36
10.	"Everybody Is Sober"	Jon Nichols, Westberg, Hart	4:17
11.	"Weight of the World"	Beth Hart	4:50

The European limited edition features an additional acoustic bonus track, "Oh Me Oh My".

== Personnel ==
- Beth Hart - Lyrics, Keyboards, Piano, Strings, Vocals
- Rune Westberg - Bass, Lyrics, Engineer, Guitar, Producer
- David Wolff - Executive Producer, Management
- Stephen Galfas - Guitar, Keyboards, Mixing
- Frederik Bokkenheuser - Drums
- Tim Fagan - Lyrics (Happiness... Any Day Now)
- Jon Nichols - Lyrics (Everybody Is Sober)
- Brian Nielsen - Booking
- Arnold Wegner - Booking
- Peggy Seagren - Hair Stylist, Make-Up
- Bory Tan - Stylist
- Greg Watermann - Photography
- Lucy Watermann - Design
- Scott Guetzkow - Tour Manager
- Slash - Guitar (Sister Heroine)
