= Black Coffee (Beth Hart and Joe Bonamassa album) =

Studio album by Beth Hart and Joe Bonamassa
- Released: January 26, 2018
- Recorded: August 18–21, 2016
- Genre: Soul, blues
- Length: 44:41
- Label: J&R Adventures, Mascot Label
- Producer: Kevin Shirley

Beth Hart and Joe Bonamassa chronology
Live in Amsterdam (2014)	Black Coffee (2018)

Joe Bonamassa chronology
Blues of Desperation (2016)	Black Coffee (2018)	Redemption (2018)

Beth Hart chronology
Fire on the Floor (2016)	Black Coffee (2018)	Front and Center – Live from New York (2018)

Professional ratings
Review scores
Source	Rating
AllMusic	4/5 stars
American Songwriter	4/5 stars
Blues Rock Review	9/10 stars
Classic Rock	3/5 stars

Black Coffee is the third cover album recorded by American singer Beth Hart and blues rock guitarist Joe Bonamassa, released on January 26, 2018 on J&R Adventures and Mascot Label Group. It follows their 2013 cover album together titled Seesaw.

== Track listing ==
No.	Title	Writer(s)	Original artist	Length
1.	"Give It Everything You Got"	Edgar Winter, Jerry LaCroix	Edgar Winter	4:38
2.	"Damn Your Eyes"	Barbara Wyrick, Stephen Bogard	Etta James	4:34
3.	"Black Coffee"	Ike Turner, Tina Turner	Ike & Tina Turner	4:16
4.	"Lullaby of the Leaves"	Bernice Petkere, Joseph Young	Connee Boswell	5:44
5.	"Why Don't You Do Right"	Kansas Joe McCoy	Lil Green	4:35
6.	"Saved"	Jerry Leiber, Mike Stoller	LaVern Baker	3:51
7.	"Sitting on Top of the World"	Walter Vinson, Lonnie Chatmon	Mississippi Sheiks	3:58
8.	"Joy"	Lucinda Williams	Lucinda Williams	4:23
9.	"Soul on Fire"	Ahmet Ertegun, Jerry Wexler, LaVern Baker	LaVern Baker with Orchestra	5:02
10.	"Addicted"	Eva Engel, Klaus Waldeck	Waldeck	3:40
Total length:				44:41

Deluxe album bonus track
No.	Title	Writer(s)	Original artist	Length
11.	"Come Rain or Come Shine"	Harold Arlen, Johnny Mercer	Broadway cast of St. Louis Woman	5:05

Note: Track list sources & citations – iTunes "Black Coffee", Secondhand Songs "Black Coffee",

== Personnel ==
Musicians

- Joe Bonamassa – guitar
- Beth Hart – vocals
- Rob McNelley – rhythm guitar
- Michael Rhodes – bass guitar
- Anton Fig – drums, percussion
- Reese Wynans – keyboards
- Paulie Cerra – tenor saxophone, baritone saxophone
- Ron Dzuibla – tenor saxophone, baritone saxophone
- Lee Thornburg – trumpet, trombone
- Jade Macreae – backing vocals
- Juanita Tippins – backing vocals
- Mahalia Barnes – backing vocals

Production

- Kevin Shirley – production
- Rob Katz – engineering
- Bob Ludwig – mastering
- Jaramiah Rios – engineering assistance
- Kevin Luu – engineering assistance
- Roy Weisman – executive production
- Lowell Reynolds – recording
- Ben Rodgers – recording
- Ron Dziubla – recording

== Charts ==
Chart (2018)	Peak position
Australian Albums (ARIA)	72
Austrian Albums (Ö3 Austria)	7
Belgian Albums (Ultratop Flanders)	18
Belgian Albums (Ultratop Wallonia)	29
Canadian Albums (Billboard)	98
Czech Albums (ČNS IFPI)	8
Dutch Albums (Album Top 100)	1
Finnish Albums (Suomen virallinen lista)	30
German Albums (Offizielle Top 100)	4
Hungarian Albums (MAHASZ)	17
Italian Albums (FIMI)	44
Norwegian Albums (VG-lista)	14
Polish Albums (ZPAV)	6
Swedish Albums (Sverigetopplistan)	27
Swiss Albums (Schweizer Hitparade)	3
UK Albums (OCC)	7
US Billboard 200	63
US Top Blues Albums (Billboard)	1

== Certifications ==
Region	Certification	Certified units/sales
Poland (ZPAV)	Gold	10,000^{‡}
^{‡} Sales+streaming figures based on certification alone.
