= Leave the Light On (Beth Hart album) =

Studio album by Beth Hart
- Released: October 21, 2003
- Genre: Rock
- Length: 42:25
- Labels: Warner Bros., Koch
- Producer: Beth Hart

Beth Hart chronology
Screamin' for My Supper (1999)	Leave the Light On (2003)	Live at Paradiso (2005)

Singles from Leave the Light On
- 1. "Leave the Light On" Released: March 1, 2004; 2. "World Without You" Released: March 14, 2005

Professional ratings
Review scores
Source	Rating
Allmusic	4.5/5 stars
PopMatters	(not rated)

Leave the Light On is an album by Beth Hart. Several versions of this album exist, ranging from the very original release in New Zealand in the spring of 2003 (on Warner Music NZ), the standard international version released worldwide later in the fall of 2003 (on Koch Records), then several specialized reissues in various European markets over the following few years. The German release (on Universal Music GmbH) contains entirely new recordings of three previously released songs, as well as three newer songs that would later be re-recorded for her next studio album 37 Days.

== Track listings ==
Standard International Edition
No.	Title	Writer(s)	Length
1.	"Lifts You Up"	Beth Hart, Greg Sutton, Bob Thiele	3:37
2.	"Leave the Light On"	Beth Hart, Oliver Leiber	4:02
3.	"Bottle of Jesus"	Beth Hart, Glen Burtnick	3:13
4.	"Wild Horses" (The Rolling Stones' cover)	Mick Jagger, Keith Richards	4:11
5.	"World Without You"	Oliver Leiber, John Shanks	4:07
6.	"Lay Your Hands on Me"	Beth Hart, Jon Nichols	4:11
7.	"Monkey Back"	Beth Hart, Jon Nichols	3:17
8.	"Broken and Ugly"	Beth Hart	3:22
9.	"If God Only Knew"	Beth Hart, Greg Sutton, Kevin Savigar	3:43
10.	"Lifetime"	Beth Hart	4:07
11.	"Sky Full of Clover"	Beth Hart	4:02
12.	"I'll Stay With You"	Beth Hart	3:20

New Zealand Version
No.	Title	Length
1.	"Lifts You Up"	3:37
2.	"Is That Too Much to Ask"	3:16
3.	"Leave the Light On"	4:02
4.	"Bottle of Jesus"	3:13
5.	"Lifetime"	4:10
6.	"If God Only Knew"	4:45
7.	"Sky Full of Clover"	4:02
8.	"And So We Are"	4:02
9.	"Broken and Ugly"	3:22
10.	"I'll Stay With You"	3:20
11.	"L.A. Song" (New Recording)	4:06

Danish Special Edition
No.	Title	Writer(s)	Length
1.	"Learning to Live"	Beth Hart, Rune Westberg	4:14
2.	"Lifts You Up"		3:38
3.	"World Without You"		4:08
4.	"Leave the Light On"		4:03
5.	"Bottle of Jesus"		3:18
6.	"Say Something"	Hart, Westberg	3:13
7.	"Lay Your Hands on Me"		4:12
8.	"Monkey Back"		3:19
9.	"If God Only Knew"		3:45
10.	"Crazy Kind of Day"	Hart, Westberg	4:08
11.	"Hiding Under Water"	Hart, Westberg	4:15
12.	"Wild Horses"		4:02
13.	"Broken and Ugly"		3:23
14.	"Lifetime"		4:08
15.	"Sky Full of Clover"		4:02

Dutch Special Edition Disc 1
No.	Title	Length
1.	"Hiding Under Water"	4:27
2.	"Say Something"	3:12
3.	"Crazy Kind of Day"	4:08
4.	"I Don't Want to Be" (Featuring Barry Hay)	3:57
5.	"Learning to Live"	4:13
6.	"Lifts You Up"	3:38
7.	"Leave the Light On"	4:02
8.	"Bottle of Jesus"	3:18
9.	"World Without You"	4:11
10.	"Lay Your Hands on Me"	4:12
11.	"Broken and Ugly"	3:23
12.	"Lifetime"	4:10
13.	"If God Only Knew"	3:45
14.	"Monkey Back"	3:20
15.	"Sky Full Of Clover"	4:02
16.	"I'll Stay With You"	4:24

Dutch Special Edition Disc 2
No.	Title	Length
1.	"Hiding Under Water" (Live Recording Paradiso)	4:37
2.	"Broken & Ugly" (Live Recording Paradiso)	4:39
3.	"Leave the Light On" (Live Recording Paradiso)	4:32
4.	"Get Your Shit Together" (Live Recording Paradiso)	5:42
5.	"L.A. Song" (Home Recording)	3:55

German Edition
No.	Title	Length
1.	"Lifts You Up"	3:38
2.	"Leave the Light On" (New Version)	4:43
3.	"Bottle of Jesus"	3:16
4.	"World Without You" (New Version)	4:24
5.	"Learning to Live" (New Version)	3:49
6.	"Easy"	5:11
7.	"Over You"	4:23
8.	"Missing You"	4:48
9.	"Lay Your Hands on Me"	4:11
10.	"Broken & Ugly"	3:22
11.	"Lifetime"	4:07
12.	"Monkey Back"	3:17
13.	"Sky Full of Clover"	4:02

== Personnel ==
Musicians

- Beth Hart - vocals, piano
- Richard Baker AKA Richard John Baker - Hammond B3 organ
- Rev. Brady Blade – drums
- Jimmie Bones – organ
- Mike Bradford – bass, keyboards, guitar, bass guitar, electric piano
- Paul Buckmaster – string arrangements, string conductor
- Jorgen Carlsson – bass
- Kevin Cloud – drums
- Chris Frazer Smith – hammond organ
- David Gamson – keyboards
- Sergio González – drums
- Bernie Hershey – conga, drums
- Jerry Hey – horn
- Dan Higgins – horn
- Russ Kunkel – drums
- Oliver Leiber – guitar
- Greg Leisz – pedal steel
- Tom Lilly – bass, bass guitar
- Scott Miracle – drums
- Albert Molinaro – bass, bass guitar
- Jon Nichols – guitar
- Kip Packard – guitar
- David Raven – drums
- Danny Saber – bass, guitar, bass guitar
- Chris Smith – Hammond B3
- Patrick Warren – keyboards

Production

- Eric "ET" Thorngren – audio production, producer, engineer, mastering, mixing
- Danny Saber – programming, mixing, audio production, producer
- Mike Bradford – mixing, audio production, producer
- Bryan Golder – Digital Editing
- David Gamson – programming, mixing
- Oliver Leiber – producer, audio production, engineer
- Patricia Sullivan Fourstar – mastering
- Jeff Chenault – art Direction, design
- John Franck – product manager
- Marc DeSisto – engineer
- Greg Waterman – photography
- Kimberly Goodnight – fashion advisor
- Peggy Seagren – make-up, hair stylist
- Carla Solinger – stylist
- Rob Hill – engineer
- David Wilkes – A&R

== Charts ==
Chart (2003)	Peak position
Denmark Albums Chart	5
Netherlands Albums Top 100	17
New Zealand Album Charts	21
Norwegian Album Charts	23

== Certifications ==
Region	Certification	Certified units/sales
Denmark (IFPI Danmark)	2× Platinum	80,000^{^}
^{^} Shipments figures based on certification alone.
