= Bang Bang Boom Boom =

Studio album by Beth Hart
- Released: October 5, 2012
- Genre: Blues rock
- Length: 48:58
- Label: Provogue/Mascot Label
- Producer: Kevin Shirley

Beth Hart chronology
| Don't Explain (2011) | Bang Bang Boom Boom (2012) | Seesaw (2013) |

Singles from Bang Bang Boom Boom
- 1. ""Baddest Blues"" Released: October 1, 2012; 2. ""Bang Bang Boom Boom"" Released: October 14, 2012; 3. ""Thru the Window of My Mind"" Released: January 28, 2013

Professional ratings
Review scores
| Source | Rating |
|---|---|
| Allmusic | 3/5 stars |
| American Songwriter | 4/5 stars |

Bang Bang Boom Boom is the sixth studio album by American singer-songwriter Beth Hart, released on October 5, 2012 by Provogue/Mascot Label.

== Track listing ==
| No. | Title | Writer(s) | Length |
|---|---|---|---|
| 1. | "Baddest Blues" | Beth Hart | 4:48 |
| 2. | "Bang Bang Boom Boom" | Hart, Rune Westberg | 3:35 |
| 3. | "Better Man" | Hart, Monty Byrom | 3:48 |
| 4. | "Caught Out in the Rain" | Hart, James House | 7:13 |
| 5. | "Swing My Thing Back Around" | Hart | 3:37 |
| 6. | "With You Every Day" | Hart, Juan Winans | 3:04 |
| 7. | "Thru the Window of My Mind" | Hart, Westberg | 4:22 |
| 8. | "Spirit of God" | Hart | 4:52 |
| 9. | "There in Your Heart" | Hart | 4:31 |
| 10. | "The Ugliest House on the Block" | Hart | 5:12 |
| 11. | "Everything Must Change" | Hart | 3:48 |

US Bonus Track
| No. | Title | Writer(s) | Length |
|---|---|---|---|
| 12. | "I'd Rather Go Blind" (feat. Jeff Beck) | Ellington Jordan, Billy Foster | 5:01 |

== Personnel ==
Musicians

- Beth Hart – Piano, Vocals
- Lee Thornburg – Horn Arrangements, Trombone, Trumpet
- Curt Bisquera – Drums
- Herman Matthews – Drums
- Anton Fig – Drums
- Lenny Castro – Percussion
- Joe Bonamassa – Guitar solo (Track 9)
- Randy Flowers – Guitar
- Michael Rhodes – Bass
- Jeff Bova – String Arrangements
- Ron Dziubla – Saxophone
- Arlan Schierbaum – Organ

Production

- Rune Westberg – Engineer, Mixing, producer, Lyrics (Tracks 2 & 7)
- Kevin Shirley – Mixing, producer
- Scott Guetzkow – Executive Producer
- David Wolff – Executive Producer
- Bob Ludwig – Mastering
- Josh La Count – Recording Assistant
- Jared Kvitka – Engineer
- Beth Hart – Lyrics
- Monty Byrom – Lyrics (Track 3)
- James House – Lyrics (Track 4)
- Juan Winans – Lyrics (Track 6)
- Marcus Bird – photography and direction
- Cathy Highland – Hair Stylist, Make-Up
- Sasa Jalali – Wardrobe
- Jeff Katz – Photography
- Roy Koch – Package Design

== Charts ==
| Chart (2012) | Peak position |
|---|---|
| Austrian Album Charts | 50 |
| Denmark Albums Chart | 6 |
| French Album Charts | 59 |
| German Album Charts | 39 |
| Netherlands Albums Top 100 | 8 |
| Norwegian Album Charts | 24 |
| Swedish Album Charts | 40 |
| Switzerland Album Charts | 34 |
| UK Albums Chart | 52 |
