= Better Than Home =

Studio album by Beth Hart
- Released: April 13, 2015
- Recorded: August 2014
- Genre: Blues rock, blues, soul
- Length: 48:58
- Label: Provogue/Mascot Label
- Producer: Rob Mathes and Michael Stevens

Beth Hart chronology
Live in Amsterdam (2014)	Better Than Home (2015)	Fire on the Floor (2016)

Professional ratings
Review scores
Source	Rating
Allmusic	3.5/5 stars
Blues Rock Review	8/10 stars

Better Than Home is the seventh solo studio album by American singer-songwriter Beth Hart. Hart's husband and her manager convinced her to work with the production team of Rob Mathes and Michael Stevens, whom she had met when she performed at the Kennedy Center Honors in 2012. Hart had worked with Kevin Shirley for her last three albums, but she was persuaded to try a different team and go a different direction. The production team challenged Hart to leave behind the darker themes and to "write more about my joy and what I believe in and what my love is." Hart was pushed to write songs that came from a different source, from when she was happy or having a good time. One song on the album, "Tell Her You Belong to Me", took her a year and a half to write.

== Track listing ==
All tracks are written by Beth Hart.

No.	Title	Length
1.	"Might as Well Smile"	4:01
2.	"Tell 'Em to Hold On"	4:24
3.	"Tell Her You Belong to Me"	5:56
4.	"Trouble"	4:42
5.	"Better Than Home"	4:37
6.	"St. Teresa"	5:07
7.	"We're Still Living in the City"	4:20
8.	"The Mood That I'm In"	3:55
9.	"Mechanical Heart"	4:16
10.	"As Long as I Have a Song"	3:25
11.	"Mama This One's for You"	3:26
Total length:		48:09

== Charts ==
=== Weekly charts ===
Chart (2015)	Peak position
Austrian Albums (Ö3 Austria)	11
Belgian Albums (Ultratop Flanders)	59
Belgian Albums (Ultratop Wallonia)	41
Danish Albums (Hitlisten)	39
Dutch Albums (Album Top 100)	1
French Albums (SNEP)	39
German Albums (Offizielle Top 100)	11
Norwegian Albums (VG-lista)	16
Scottish Albums (OCC)	30
Swedish Albums (Sverigetopplistan)	47
Swiss Albums (Schweizer Hitparade)	5
UK Albums (OCC)	33
US Billboard 200	133
US Top Blues Albums (Billboard)	1
US Top Rock Albums (Billboard)	19

=== Year-end charts ===
Chart (2015)	Position
Dutch Albums (Album Top 100)	64
US Top Blues Albums (Billboard)	12
