= Filippa Giordano =

Italian-born Mexican singer (born 1974)

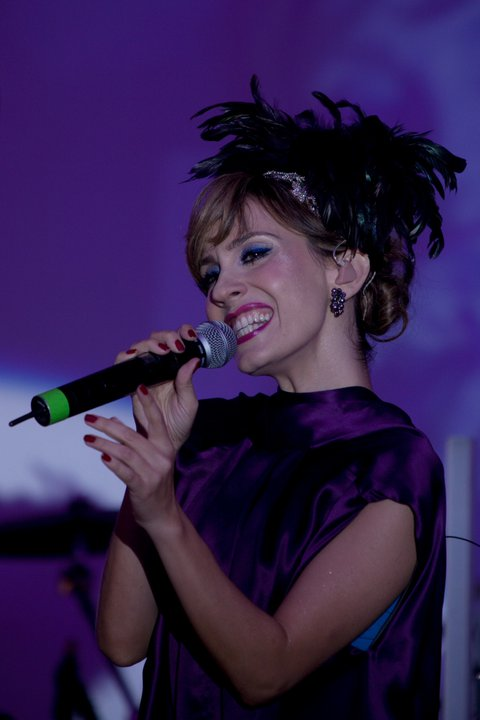
- Giordano performing in 2012

Background information
- Origin: Palermo, Italy
- Genres: Classical crossover, pop
- Years active: 2000–present
- Labels: Sugar, Atlantic, WEA, Sony Music

Filippa Giordano (born 14 February 1974) is an Italian-born Mexican crossover singer.

== Biography ==
Giordano was born in Palermo. At the age of nine, she started ballet at the National Academy of Rome (where she moved with her family). Giordano grew up in the opera world following her parents, but at the same time, she fell in love with the pop world. She started her singing studies with her mother as a teacher, and she learned both the techniques for opera and pop music. In 2010, Giordano obtained Mexican citizenship.

== Musical success ==
In September 1998, she released her first album Passioni with Italian pop producers Celso Valli (Andrea Bocelli, Eros Ramazzotti, Laura Pausini, etc.) and Marco Sabiu (Take That, Tanita Tikaram, etc.).

In February 1999, she won the 2nd prize at the Sanremo Festival. Due to this success in Sanremo, Giordano performed at the most important events of the year, the David di Donatello Awards for the awarding of The Legend of 1900 by Giuseppe Tornatore, and on Donna sotto le stelle, a major fashion TV event.

In August 1999, she released the international version of the album Passioni called Filippa Giordano. The record was distributed by Warner Classics UK.

Rising to the top of the classical charts, she reached gold status in Japan and in Australia. She was the honoured guest at the first edition of the British Classical Awards at the Royal Albert Hall in London.

The same year, Giordano performed on TV shows around the world, such as Parkinson and Barrymore in the UK, the NHK Music Christmas show and Music Fair in Japan and the Lottery show on NDR, Germany.

In March 2000, Giordano opened The Maria Callas Museum at the Metropolitan Theatre in New York.

In May 2000, she was invited, at the direct request of HRH Prince Charles of Britain, to give a concert for His annual "Prince's Trust Gala Dinner" and, a few months later, the Mayor of New York, Michael Bloomberg organized a dinner at his house in her honour.

In October 2000, she won the annual edition of the "Echo Awards" in Germany in the category "Music without borders".

In January 2001, she was invited by Mohammed Al Fayed for the opening of the famous "Harrods Sales" in London, coming after names like Cher, Sophia Loren, Raquel Welch and Christina Aguilera.

In March 2001, during the Academy Awards in Los Angeles, she performed for Dino De Laurentiis, winner of the Thalberg Prize for his career. On the same occasion, she sang accompanied by Ennio Morricone on the piano, in order to celebrate his nomination for the G. Tornatore's movie "Malena".

In July 2001, she was invited by Cristina and Riccardo Muti to hold a concert during the prestigious "Ravenna's Festival". In Autumn 2001, she recorded the love theme of the Italian movie "Vajont" beside Andrea Bocelli, interpreter of another theme. She was also the voice of "Aida degli alberi", an animation movie scored by M°Ennio Morricone. In the movie, Filippa sang a duet with Mick Hucknell (Simply Red).

She is one of the artists (Pavarotti, Sting, Blondie, Dalla) to perform in the album called "Cinema Italiano", a homage to the best Italian movie melodies.

In 2002, Giordano recorded her second CD, "Il Rosso Amore", produced by Robin Smith (Tina Turner, Cher, Lionel Richie) for Brian Rawling Productions in England and by the famous Italian Orchestra arranger M° Renato Serio. The album contains a mix of beautiful melodies and arias from the past and original songs written by great composers ( E. Morricone, D. Foster, R. Smith, C. Muti, F.Sartori, L. Quarantotto). With the song "Amarti Si" she participated again at the Sanremo Festival this time in the "celebrities" category.

In the video of the English version "Heaven Knows" directed by Tim Rice (Robbie Williams, Nicole Kidman), Filippa met Giorgio Armani, who created her new look.

In this year, Giordano posed for the main magazines such as "In Style" – UK, "Gala" – Germany, appearing on the cover of "Marie Claire" as an icon of Italian fashion.

In May 2002, she sang in a duet with Anni-Frid Lyngstad from the legendary group "ABBA", who really wanted to sing with her after a long time of not performing.In the same month, she met the Oscar-winning Vangelis in Athens for a special interpretation of the Neapolitan song 'Torna a Surriento'.

On the occasion of her tour in Japan, she presented a new, different show surrounded by dancers with the choreography of Susanna Beltrami from the "La Scala Theatre" in Milan. The tour was sold out after only one week of advance sales. On her return to Italy, the Mayor of Palermo presented her with "The keys of the city".

For Christmas 2002, she sang at the prestigious TV Show "Natale in Vaticano", for the second time in her career, with artists like Dionne Warwick, Tom Jones, Lionel Richie etc., singing for the Pope for the third time (Jubilee 2000).

In the summer of 2003, Filippa attended a Stanislavsky Method workshop with Michael Margotta from the Actors Studio of New York.

For a special event at the University of Rome, she sang Ennio Morricone's songs, conducted by his son, Andrea Morricone. After the performance, Filippa was asked by Ennio Morricone to repeat the concert at the Auditorium in Rome with him personally conducting the Orchestra. She sang for the 25th Gold Efebo of the Italian Cinema, where Ettore Scola and Gabriele Salvadores were rewarded.

In December 2003, she gave her recitals at the International Forum Hall in Tokyo (two dates), the Festival Hall in Osaka and the main Theatres in Nagoya, Fukuoka and Sendai. During her career, she performed live with prestigious Orchestras such as "The Super World Orchestra" (made of top elements from various world Symphony Orchestras) and the "BBC Orchestra".

In February 2004, she was invited by the City of Guadalajara to celebrate its birthday; she also performed in the historic Teatro Josefa Ortiz de Domínguez in Querétaro, where she received recognition from the university.

In March 2004, Filippa moved to Los Angeles to work on her new classical album (she wrote some new tracks and co-produced it). In October 2004, she sang the "Ave Maria" for the Columbus Day Parade at St. Patrick's Church in New York.

During her whole career, she has been invited, as Testimonial, for major brands' special events like Longines, Armani, Ferragamo, BMW, Roger Dubouis, Damiani, and Bulgari.

In October 2005, Filippa was the special guest for Ennio Morricone's tour in Japan. On this occasion, she had the pleasure of meeting Junichiro Koizumi, Japanese Prime Minister.

In November 2005, she released the album PrimaDonna in Japan. The song she wrote, "When I come back home", reached the 2nd position on the Hot 100 Chart on JWave Radio, following Madonna's hit Hung Up.

== Success in The Americas and the Spanish style ==
In 2006, Filippa performed at the biggest and most important arenas in Latin America: Auditorio Nacional in Mexico City (receiving the nomination for 'Best Classical Show' at the LUNAS); more than eight thousand people enjoyed a spectacular show, this performance followed by presentations in other major Mexican cities.

She was also honoured by the Zacatecas Governor during her show in the city and accepted the invitation to the Delicias and Cd Juarez Cultural Festival, where she gathered more than thirty thousand people.

Filippa performed on 26 September, representing International women, before an estimated audience of more than 10,000 attendees to the CONFERENCE ON WOMEN, organized by California Governor, Arnold Schwarzenegger and First Lady, Maria Shriver, among attending celebrities were: Dalai Lama, Martha Stewart, Sarah Ferguson, Tyra Banks and many more.

At the end of the year, Prima Donna was released by Sony/Bmg in Mexico and other Latin American countries. The album contains, for the first time in her career, two songs in Spanish: 'Me He Enamorado de Ti' (Woman in Love) and 'Como He de Vivir Sin Tu Cariño' (How Am I Supposed to Live Without Your Love). Prima Donna was produced by Steve Galante and Filippa; the album was recorded in Montreal, Canada and Rome, Italy.

In November, she performed for the 100th Anniversary of Grupo Salinas for a special audience including Felipe Calderon, Vicente Fox, Ricardo Salinas, and Carlos Slim.

In December, she sang on the Movie Soundtrack 'Guadalupe' released in Mexico and the United States.

In February 2007, Prima Donna reached the Gold Status in Mexico. In May, she toured and performed in the National Auditorium again, being nominated for the second time at the October 2007 LUNAS.

In December 2007, she gave a recital at the Esplanade Concert Hall in Singapore with the Philharmonic Orchestra.

In 2008, Filippa entered the recording studio to write and co-produce her new material "Capriccio", where for the first time, she sang almost the entire album in Spanish, reaching the first positions on the Mexican Charts until March 2009.

== Singing for Mexico ==
In the year 2008, she married Mexican businessman Brando Lomelí, initiating for Filippa a new stage, coming closer to and allowing her to be captivated by a new musical genre that reflects what Mexico marks in her life and career releasing her new album in 2009, and to celebrate the bicentennial of Mexican independence her album entitled "With Love to Mexico," produced by Latin Grammy winner Guillermo Gil, achieving a gold record for its high sales. In 2009, she offered a major concert with the renowned Mexican singer Guadalupe Pineda. This presentation won her the nomination for "Las Lunas del Auditorio" as the best show of the year. At the end of 2009, Filippa was invited to appear in Bogota, Colombia. In early 2010, she gave a concert in the Thai capital, Bangkok, and one more in the city of Phoenix, Arizona, for the celebration of the Virgin of Guadalupe Festival. By mid-2010, she launched the repackaging of the album "With Love to Mexico" gold edition DVD, which is about to achieve Platinum certification. She has always stressed her participation in social events of high importance, such as Teleton Mexico 2010, the Homage to the Virgin of Guadalupe where the most important Latin American artists are present at the Basilica of Guadalupe, in addition to participating in events of great significance such as the UN Climate Change (COP16) Parts Conference in Cancun, at the forum of Supreme Master TV, and in the celebration of the First Anniversary of the Foreign Residents Club in Monte Carlo, Monaco. In late 2010 and early 2011, she offered an impressive series of concerts, including the one at the Castillo de Chapultepec, the National Auditorium in Mexico City, DF, and at the Auditorio Telmex in Guadalajara, Jalisco; the latter with more than 10,000 spaces, with the special participation of Armando Manzanero, Gianluca Grignani, and the Pandora trio. In July 2011, she prepared her new album with operatic areas, Italian classical songs and Mexican themes internationally renowned, with arrangements that blend Mexican and Italian cultures for the first time.

== Discography ==
=== Studio and live albums ===
List of albums, with Australian chart positions
| Title | Album details | Peak chart positions | Certifications |
| Title | Album details | AUS | Certifications |
|---|---|---|---|
| Passioni | Released: 1998; Format: CD; Label: Sugar, Universal | - | |
| Filippa Giordano | Released: 1999; Format: CD; Label: Sugar, Universal | 25 | ARIA: Gold |
| Il Rosso Amore | Released: April 2002; Format: CD; Label: Sugar, WEA | 24 | |
| Prima Donna | Released: 2005; Format: CD; Label: Sony Music | - | |
| Prima Donna Live | Released: 2007; Format: CD; Label: Sony Music | - | |
| Capriccio | Released: 2008; Format: CD; Label: Sony Music | - | |
| Con Amor a Mexico | Released: 2009; Format: CD; Label: Sony Music | - | |
| Alma Italiana, Pasión Latina | Released: 2011; Format: CD; Label: Sony Music | - | |
| Friends & Legends – Duets | Released: 2018; Format: CD; Label: Sony Music | - | |

=== Compilation albums ===
List of compilation albums, with selected details
| Title | Details |
|---|---|
| The Ultimate Collection | Released: 2008; Format: CD+DVD; Label: Sony BMG Music Entertainment |
