= Screamin' for My Supper =

Studio album by Beth Hart
- Released: August 3, 1999
- Recorded: The Sound Chamber, 'Ollywood Studios
- Genre: Rock
- Length: 60:57
- Label: Atlantic
- Producers: Beth Hart, Tal Herzberg, Oliver Leiber

Beth Hart chronology
Immortal (1996)	Screamin' for My Supper (1999)	Leave the Light On (2003)

Singles from Screamin' for My Supper
- 1. "L.A. Song (Out of This Town)" Released: July 20, 1999; 2. "Delicious Surprise" Released: March 20, 2000

Professional ratings
Review scores
Source	Rating
AllMusic	4/5 stars

Screamin' for My Supper is the second studio album by American singer/songwriter Beth Hart. It was released on August 3, 1999, by Atlantic Records. The album features her most notable single to date, "L.A. Song (Out of This Town)", which was a number-one hit in New Zealand and a Top 5 hit on the US Adult Contemporary Singles Chart. The album peaked at number 143 on the Billboard albums chart in the US; and number 22 on the RIANZ albums chart in New Zealand. "Delicious Surprise" was later recorded by Jo Dee Messina on her 2005 album of the same name, from which it was released as a single.

== Track listing ==
No.	Title	Writer(s)	Producer(s)	Length
1.	"Just a Little Hole"	Beth Hart, Greg Sutton, Bob Thiele	Beth Hart, Tal Herzberg	5:16
2.	"Delicious Surprise"	Glen Burtnik, Hart	Oliver Leiber	3:48
3.	"L.A. Song (Out of This Town)"	Hart	Leiber	3:55
4.	"Is That Too Much to Ask"	Hart, Sutton, Thiele	Hart, Herzberg	3:32
5.	"By Her"	Lanny Cordola, Hart	Hart, Herzberg	4:08
6.	"Get Your Shit Together"	Burtnik, Hart	Hart, Herzberg	4:42
7.	"Stay"	Hart	Hart, Herzberg	4:49
8.	"G.O.P."	Hart	Hart, Herzberg	4:00
9.	"Skin"	Hart	Hart, Herzberg	5:00
10.	"Girls Say"	Hart	Hart, Herzberg	3:44
11.	"Sky Is Falling"	Burtnik, Hart	Hart, Herzberg	4:34
12.	"Mama"	Hart	Hart, Herzberg	4:27
13.	"Favorite Things / House of Sin (Hidden Track)"	Hart	Hart, Herzberg	9:02
Total length:				60:57

Bonus Track
No.	Title	Writer(s)	Producer(s)	Length
14.	"Take Me Away"	Hart	Leiber	4:21
Total length:				65:22

== Personnel ==
Primary musicians

- Beth Hart – arranger, artwork, composer, concept design, design, Fender Rhodes, keyboards, orchestral arrangements, paintings, piano, producer, vocals
- Tristan Avakian – guitar
- Rocco Bidlovski – drums
- Tal Herzberg – bass, engineer, mixing, producer, programming
- Jimmy Khoury – guitar
- Matt Laug – drums
- Oliver Leiber – bass, drum programming, guitar, producer, programming
- Lance Morrison – bass
- David Raven – drums
- Patrick Warren – accordion, chamberlin, harmonium
- John Shanks – guitar

Additional musicians

- Yolanda Adams – backing vocals
- Luis Conte – percussion
- Kirstin Fife – strings
- Elaine Gibbs – backing vocals
- Aaron Gross – percussion
- Jeff Lorber – keyboards
- Gina Kronstadt – strings
- Novi Novog – strings
- Benmont Tench – Hammond synth, keyboards, Hammond organ, piano
- Chris Hammer Smith – harmonica

Other credits

- Jennifer Barbato – art direction, design, logo design
- Joe Barresi – engineer
- Jason Flom – direction
- Jaymes Foster-Levy – direction, director
- Larry Frazin – direction, director
- John Gyer – assistant engineer
- Donovan Hebard – coordination
- Chris Lord-Alge – mixing
- Stephen Marcussen – mastering
- Nick Marshall – assistant engineer, mixing, mixing assistant
- John A. Pinsky – design, logo design
- Dave Reitzas – mixing
- Jill Rose – artist development
- Barry Rudolph – engineer
- Patrick Seymour – arranger, string arrangements
- Tracy Sondern – make-up
- Andrew Southam – photography
- Dan Steinberg – assistant engineer
- Greg Sutton – composer
- Bob Thiele – composer
- Eric "ET" Thorngren – engineer
- Diane Wiedenmann – hair stylist
- David Wolff – management
- Basia Zamorska – stylist

== Charts ==
Chart (1999–2000)	Peak position
Dutch Albums (Album Top 100)	97
New Zealand Albums (RMNZ)	22
US Billboard 200	143
US Heatseekers Albums (Billboard)	5
