= Immortal (Beth Hart album) =

Studio album by Beth Hart Band
- Released: May 21, 1996
- Recorded: A&M Studios, Hollywood, CA; Alpha Studios, Burbank, CA; Chartmaker Studios, Malibu, CA; Eden Studios, London, England; Rumbo Recorders, Canoga Park, CA; Sorcerer Sound, New York, NY.
- Genre: Rock
- Length: 50:00
- Label: Atlantic
- Producer: Hugh Padgham, David Foster, Mike Clink

Beth Hart Band chronology
Beth Hart and the Ocean of Souls (1993)	Immortal (1996)	Screamin' for My Supper (1999)

Singles from Immortal
- 1. "God Bless You" Released: 1996; 2. "Immortal" Released: October 1996

Immortal is the debut solo album by Beth Hart, then releasing music as Beth Hart Band.

== Track listing ==
No.	Title	Writer(s)	Length
1.	"Run"	Beth Hart, Jimmy Khoury	4:08
2.	"Spiders in My Bed"	Hart	4:44
3.	"Isolation"	Hart, Khoury; Tal Herzberg	5:17
4.	"Hold Me Through the Night"	Hart, Khoury	4:08
5.	"State of Mind"	Hart, Khoury; Herzberg	2:51
6.	"Burn Chile"	Hart, Khoury; Herzberg	4:10
7.	"Immortal"	Hart, Khoury; Herzberg; David Reitzas	4:23
8.	"Summer Is Gone"	Hart	4:44
9.	"Ringing"	Hart, Khoury; Herzberg; Reitzas	3:06
10.	"God Bless You"	Hart, Khoury	3:10
11.	"Am I the One"	Hart	6:39
12.	"Blame the Moon"	Jeoffrey Tozer	2:43
Total length:			50:03

== Personnel ==
Beth Hart Band

- Beth Hart - vocals, piano; additional bass on "Isolation"
- Jimmy Khoury - electric and acoustic guitar; piano on "God Bless You"
- Tal Herzberg - bass
- Sergio Gonzalez - drums, percussion

with:

- Luis Conte - percussion
- David Foster - piano on "Hold Me Through the Night"
- Claude Gaudette - strings on "Hold Me Through the Night"
