= Delicious Surprise (song) =

Single by Beth Hart

from the album Screamin' for My Supper
- Released: March 20, 2000
- Genre: Rock
- Length: 3:48
- Label: Atlantic
- Songwriters: Beth Hart; Glen Burtnik
- Producers: Beth Hart; Tal Herzberg; Oliver Leiber

Beth Hart singles chronology
"LA Song (Out of This Town)" (1999)	"Delicious Surprise" (2000)	"Leave the Light On" (2004)

"Delicious Surprise" is a song co-written and recorded by American singer Beth Hart for her second studio album Screamin' for My Supper (1999). It was released on August 22, 2000 as the second single from the album by Atlantic Records. The song was written by Hart and Glen Burtnik and produced by the two and Tal Herzberg. The song was also her final single for Atlantic Records before leaving the label in 2001. It was later covered in 2005 by Jo Dee Messina for her album Delicious Surprise.

== Track list (Beth Hart version) ==
German maxi-CD single
No.	Title	Length
1.	"Delicious Surprise (Album Version)"	3:48
2.	"Jackie's Song (Live Non-LP Bonus Track)"	4:32
3.	"Mama (Live Acoustic)"	5:00
4.	"LA Song (Live Bonus Track)"	4:28
Total length:		17:48

US promotional single
No.	Title	Writer(s)	Length
1.	"Delicious Surprise (I Believe) (Radio Edit)"	Hart; Burtnik	3:25
Total length:			3:25

== Jo Dee Messina version ==
"Delicious Surprise (I Believe It)"

Single by Jo Dee Messina

from the album Delicious Surprise
- Released: June 20, 2005
- Genre: Country
- Length: 3:48
- Label: Curb
- Songwriters: Beth Hart; Glen Burtnik
- Producers: Byron Gallimore; Tim McGraw

Jo Dee Messina singles chronology
"My Give a Damn's Busted" (2005)	"Delicious Surprise (I Believe It)" (2005)	"Not Going Down" (2005)

"Delicious Surprise" was later recorded by American country music artist Jo Dee Messina. It was released as the second single from her fifth studio album of the same name, re-titled as "Delicious Surprise (I Believe It)" by Curb Records on June 20, 2005. Messina's version was produced by Byron Gallimore and Tim McGraw.

Compared to the lead single "My Give a Damn's Busted", the song did underperform, only peaking at number 23 on the Hot Country Songs chart, but it did spend 20 weeks in total.

== Chart performance ==
Messina's version debuted on June 25, 2005 on the Billboard Hot Country Songs at number 57. The song then rose up to number 47 the following week. "Delicious Surprise" then rose to the top forty on July 16 at number 40. The song would later rise to its peak position of number 23 the week of September 24, 2005, spending one week in the position and spending twenty weeks overall. "Delicious Surprise" marked Messina's first single to miss the country top-20 since "Was That My Life" from her 2003 Greatest Hits compilation only reached number 21. It performed better on the Radio & Records Country Top 50, rising as high as number 18.

In Canada, the song performed moderately. "Delicious Surprise" debuted on the Radio & Records Canada Country Top 30 the week of August 5, 2005, at number 27 with 235 total plays, the highest debut of the week. The song then fell to number 29 the next week before rising again to number 28. "Delicious Surprise" rose to a peak of number 24 the week of September 23, 2005. The song overall spent 10 weeks in the country.

== Music video ==
A music video for "Delicious Surprise" was released, with it being filmed by Peter Zavadil. It premiered to CMT on August 4, 2005.

== Charts ==
Chart (2005)	Peak position
Canada Country (Radio & Records)	24
US Hot Country Songs (Billboard)	23
US Country Top 50 (Radio & Records)	18

=== Year-end charts ===
Chart (2005)	Position
US Country Top 50 (Radio & Records)	85

== Release history ==
Release dates and format(s) for "Delicious Surprise (I Believe It)"
Region	Date	Format	Label(s)	Ref.
United States	June 20, 2005	Country radio	Curb Records	
