= Slackwax =

- Origin: Nuremberg, Germany
- Genres: Electro with various influences
- Years active: 2005-present
- Labels: Modernsoul
- Members: Bernd Batke; Peter Hoppe
- Website: www.slackwax.de

Slackwax is a German musical duo of electronic music formed in 2005 and made up of Bernd Batke and Peter Hoppe. Batke was at the same time frontman, singer and bass player of the neo-country band Smokestack Lightnin', whereas Hoppe was a Nuremberg-based music producer. The style of the duo is electro, moody and atmospheric with elements of jazz, blues, soul, country together with contemporary beats and modern production techniques. They are signed to the German label Modernsoul.

The duo released a self-titled EP titled Slackwax in 2008, followed by EP "Close to My Fire (in 2010), their best known hit and EP Night Out (2012) and are preparing for a full studio album for 2013 with "Night Out" as the first single from the release. They also released two mix EPs, Night Out – The Remixes in 2012 and Slackwax reworks Mousse T. also in 2012 offering a completely new perspective on Mousse T. hits with vocals from Anna Leyne on the tracks.

Slackwax are most famous for their 2010 hit single "Close to My Fire" (written by Peter Hoppe and Stephanie Popp). They have produced for Fritz Kalkbrenner, Mousse T., Bela B, The Baseballs, Oceana, Trinah, Onita Boone and others.

== In popular culture ==
- Their hit "Close to My Fire" was interpreted by Beth Hart in her joint album of covers Seesaw in 2013.
- Band's "Spookie" track was used in a TV ad for the Mini Cooper. Other Slackwax tunes were used for advertisements for Adidas, BMW, Mercedes-Benz
- Their music also appears in the soundtrack of a number of films, such as Hilde, Desert Flower, Wrecked, Punk Berlin 1982, Men Do What They Can, Da muss Mann durch, Joschka & Herr Fischer, Sources of Life and Lulu and Jimi.
