= Don't Explain (Beth Hart and Joe Bonamassa album) =

Studio album by Beth Hart and Joe Bonamassa
- Released: September 27, 2011
- Genre: Blues rock
- Length: 50:44
- Labels: J&R Adventures
- Producer: Kevin Shirley

Beth Hart and Joe Bonamassa chronology
Don't Explain (2011)	Seesaw (2013)

Joe Bonamassa chronology
Dust Bowl (2011)	Don't Explain (2011)	Driving Towards the Daylight (2012)

Beth Hart chronology
My California (2010)	Don't Explain (2011)	Bang Bang Boom Boom (2012)

Professional ratings
Review scores
Source	Rating
Allmusic	3/5 stars
Slant	3.5/5 stars

Don't Explain is a 2011 cover album recorded by American singer Beth Hart and blues rock guitarist Joe Bonamassa.

== Track listing ==
No.	Title	Writer(s)	Original artist	Length
1.	"Sinner's Prayer"	Lowell Fulson, Lloyd Glenn	Ray Charles	4:27
2.	"Chocolate Jesus"	Tom Waits, Kathleen Brennan	Tom Waits	2:39
3.	"Your Heart Is as Black as Night"	Melody Gardot	Melody Gardot	5:00
4.	"For My Friend"	Bill Withers	Bill Withers	4:11
5.	"Don't Explain"	Billie Holiday, Arthur Herzog Jr.	Billie Holiday	4:34
6.	"I'd Rather Go Blind"	Etta James, Ellington Jordan, Billy Foster	Etta James	8:06
7.	"Something's Got a Hold on Me"	Etta James, Leroy Kirkland, Pearl Woods	Etta James	6:05
8.	"I'll Take Care of You"	Brook Benton	Bobby Bland	5:13
9.	"Well, Well"	Delaney Bramlett	Delaney & Bonnie	3:42
10.	"Ain't No Way"	Carolyn Franklin	Aretha Franklin	6:47
Total length:				50:44

== Charts ==
=== Weekly charts ===
Chart (2011)	Peak position
Austrian Albums (Ö3 Austria)	32
Danish Albums (Hitlisten)	3
Dutch Albums (Album Top 100)	9
French Albums (SNEP)	90
German Albums (Offizielle Top 100)	17
Norwegian Albums (VG-lista)	12
Swedish Albums (Sverigetopplistan)	25
Swiss Albums (Schweizer Hitparade)	50
UK Albums (Official Charts)	22
UK Independent Albums (Official Charts)	4
US Billboard 200	120
US Independent Albums (Billboard)	22
US Top Blues Albums (Billboard)	3
US Top Rock Albums (Billboard)	32

=== Year-end charts ===
Chart (2011)	Position
Danish Albums (Hitlisten)	84
Dutch Albums (Album Top 100)	97

== Certifications ==
Certifications for Don't Explain
Region	Certification	Certified units/sales
Netherlands (NVPI)	Gold	25,000^{^}
Poland (ZPAV)	Gold	10,000^{‡}
United Kingdom (BPI)	Silver	60,000^{‡}
^{^} Shipments figures based on certification alone.^{‡} Sales+streaming figures based on certification alone.

== Personnel ==
Musicians

- Joe Bonamassa – guitar, vocals
- Blondie Chaplin – guitar
- Anton Fig – drums, percussion
- Beth Hart – piano, vocals, liner notes
- Carmine Rojas – bass guitar
- Arlan Schierbaum – keyboards

Production

- Laura Grover – liner notes
- Jared Kvitka – engineer
- George Marino – mastering
- James McCullagh – engineer
- Vanessa Parr – engineer
- Mike Prior – photography
- Kevin Shirley – mixing, producer
- Roy Weisman – executive producer
- Ghian Wright – engineer
