= Fire on the Floor =

Studio album by Beth Hart
- Released: October 14, 2016
- Genres: Blues rock; jazz; soul
- Length: 48:23
- Label: Provogue/Mascot Label
- Producer: Oliver Leiber

Beth Hart chronology
Better Than Home (2015)	Fire on the Floor (2016)	Black Coffee (2018)

Professional ratings
Review scores
Source	Rating
AllMusic	3.5/5 stars
Classic Rock	3.5/5 stars
Jazzwise	1/5 stars
laut.de	4/5 stars
The Music	3.5/4 stars

Fire on the Floor is the eighth solo studio album by American singer-songwriter Beth Hart. It was released on October 14, 2016 in Europe, Australia, and New Zealand—and on February 3, 2017 in the rest of the world.

== Background ==
Hart wrote and recorded the songs for Fire on the Floor before the songs for her previous album Better Than Home was mixed. Hart recorded with some musicians she had not performed with before, such as Michael Landau and Waddy Wachtel on electric guitar, and they recorded sixteen songs in three days, although the mixing took much longer. Other artists performing on the album are Jim Cox on piano, Dean Parks on acoustic guitar, Brian Allen on bass, Rick Marotta on drums, and Ivan Neville on the Hammond B3.

The album was Produced by Oliver Leiber and recorded by Niko Bolas. It debuted at No. 1 on the Billboard Blues Albums Chart, becoming her sixth number one album overall.

== Reception ==
Carley Hall of The Music stated: "Her voice amazes, nonetheless, and it's kept au naturel for the most part - you can hear her slight pitch dips in No Place Like Home, which just sits perfectly with who she is and makes for another absorbing, accessible album for fans of big, well-trained vocals."

== Track listing ==
All tracks are written by Beth Hart, except where noted.

No.	Title	Writer(s)	Length
1.	"Jazz Man"		3:51
2.	"Love Gangster"		4:09
3.	"Coca Cola"		3:38
4.	"Let's Get Together"	Hart, Rune Westberg	3:39
5.	"Love Is a Lie"		3:15
6.	"Fat Man"	Hart, Glen Burtnik	3:51
7.	"Fire on the Floor"		5:12
8.	"Woman You've Been Dreaming Of"		4:22
9.	"Baby Shot Me Down"		3:22
10.	"Good Day to Cry"		4:32
11.	"Picture in a Frame"		4:39
12.	"No Place Like Home"		3:53
Total length:			48:09

US Bonus Track
No.	Title	Length
13.	"Tell Her You Belong to Me" (featuring Jeff Beck)	4:10

== Charts ==
Chart (2016)	Peak position
Austrian Albums Chart	18
Dutch Albums Chart	6
French Albums Chart	58
German Albums Chart	18
Norwegian Albums Chart	28
Polish Albums Chart	11
Swedish Albums Chart	51
Swiss Albums Chart	13
UK Albums Chart	28
Chart (2017)	Peak position
US Billboard 200	115
US Billboard Blues Albums	1
