= Seesaw (album) =

Studio album by Beth Hart and Joe Bonamassa
- Released: May 20, 2013
- Studios: Revolver Studios (Westlake, CA); The Cave (Malibu, CA)
- Genre: Blues rock
- Length: 49:27
- Labels: J&R Adventures
- Producer: Kevin Shirley

Beth Hart and Joe Bonamassa chronology
Don't Explain (2011)	Seesaw (2013)	Live in Amsterdam (2014)

Joe Bonamassa chronology
An Acoustic Evening at the Vienna Opera House (2013)	Seesaw (2013)	Live in Amsterdam (2014)

Beth Hart chronology
Bang Bang Boom Boom (2012)	Seesaw (2013)	Live in Amsterdam (2014)

Professional ratings
Review scores
Source	Rating
AllMusic	3.5/5 stars
The Guardian	3/5 stars

Seesaw is a cover album of soul and blues classics recorded by American singer Beth Hart and blues rock guitarist Joe Bonamassa in 2013. It follows up on the success of their initial collaboration for the Don't Explain cover album in 2011. Seesaw was nominated for a Grammy Award for Best Blues Album of 2013.

== Track listing ==
No.	Title	Writer(s)	Original artist	Length
1.	"Them There Eyes"	Maceo Pinkard, Doris Tauber, William Tracey	Louis Armstrong	2:31
2.	"Close to My Fire"	Peter Hoppe, Stephanie Popp	Slackwax	5:12
3.	"Nutbush City Limits"	Tina Turner	Ike & Tina Turner	3:34
4.	"I Love You More Than You'll Ever Know"	Al Kooper	Blood, Sweat & Tears	7:03
5.	"Can't Let Go"	Randy Weeks	Lucinda Williams	4:00
6.	"Miss Lady"	Buddy Miles	Buddy Miles Express	4:54
7.	"If I Tell You I Love You"	Melody Gardot	Melody Gardot	3:36
8.	"Rhymes"	Al Green, Mabon "Teenie" Hodges	Al Green	5:03
9.	"A Sunday Kind of Love"	Louis Prima, Barbara Belle, Anita Leonard, Stan Rhodes	Etta James	3:55
10.	"Seesaw"	Don Covay, Steve Cropper	Aretha Franklin	3:25
11.	"Strange Fruit"	Lewis Allen	Billie Holiday	5:45

== Personnel ==
Musicians

- Joe Bonamassa – guitar, vocals
- Blondie Chaplin – rhythm guitar, percussion, backing vocals
- Ron Dziubla – saxophone
- Anton Fig – drums, percussion
- Beth Hart – vocals, liner notes
- Carmine Rojas – bass
- Arlan Schierbaum – piano, organ
- Lee Thornburg – trumpet, trombone

Production

- Jeff Bova – string arrangement
- Jeff Katz – photography
- Jared Kvitka – engineer
- Bob Ludwig – mastering
- Kevin Shirley – engineer, mixing, producer
- Marcus Bird – photography and direction
- Lee Thornburg – brass arrangement
- Roy Weisman – executive producer

== Chart positions ==
Chart performance for Seesaw
Chart (2013)	Peak position
Austrian Albums (Ö3 Austria)	20
Belgian Albums (Ultratop Flanders)	56
Belgian Albums (Ultratop Wallonia)	81
German Albums (Offizielle Top 100)	19
Danish Albums (Hitlisten)	22
Dutch Albums (Album Top 100)	11
Finnish Albums (Suomen virallinen lista)	44
French Albums (SNEP)	87
Norwegian Albums (VG-lista)	4
Polish Albums (ZPAV)	37
Scottish Albums (Official Charts)	25
Swedish Albums (Sverigetopplistan)	25
Swiss Albums (Schweizer Hitparade)	28
UK Albums (Official Charts)	27
UK Album Downloads (Official Charts)	75
UK Independent Albums (Official Charts)	7
UK Jazz & Blues Albums (Official Charts)	2
US Billboard 200	47
US Top Blues Albums (Billboard)	1
US Independent Albums (Billboard)	8
US Top Rock Albums (Billboard)	15
