= L.A. Song (Out of This Town) =

1999 single by Beth Hart

"L.A. Song (Out of this Town)"

Single by Beth Hart

from the album Screamin' for My Supper
- B-side: "Am I the One?"
- Released: July 20, 1999
- Length: 3:36
- Label: 143; Atlantic; Lava
- Songwriter: Beth Hart
- Producer: Oliver Leiber

Beth Hart singles chronology
"Am I the One" (1996)	"L.A. Song (Out of this Town)" (1999)	"Delicious Surprise" (2000)

"L.A. Song (Out of This Town)" is a song by American singer-songwriter Beth Hart, released as the first single from her second album, Screamin' for My Supper, on July 20, 1999. Although the song reached only No. 90 on the US Billboard Hot 100 chart, it entered the top 10 on the Billboard Adult Top 40 and reached No. 1 in New Zealand in February 2000.

== Lyrical content ==
An alternate edit of the song on the US CD single replaces the lyric "She's got a gun / She's got a gun / She got a gun she call 'the lucky one'" with "She's so ashamed / She's so ashamed / She know heaven don't want her anyway". Beth Hart explained this change through a letter on the single's back cover:

Dear friend: The enclosed CD contains two versions of "L.A. Song" the first single from my new album, Screamin' for My Supper. The original version of the song includes a line where, in the midst of a dark period in my life, I talk about having a gun. I wrote this song before the recent tragic shootings that have so shaken this country. In light of these horrible events, and especially out of respect for those who have been deeply & personally affected by them, I have chosen to record an alternate version with a new lyric which remains true to the essence of the song. Ultimately "LA Song" is about emerging from depression and self-doubt to the realization that who you are isn't about where you are or what's around you but that "THE GOOD LIFE LIES WITHIN." I don't want one particular lyric to prevent the song's positive message from reaching as many listeners as possible. As an Artist, I have the responsibility to not compromise my work. Thanks for listening! Love Beth.

== Track listings ==
US CD single

1. "L.A. Song (Out of This Town)" (alternate edit) – 3:49
2. "L.A. Song (Out of This Town)" (original edit) – 3:49

European CD single

1. "L.A. Song (Out of This Town)" (remix edit) – 3:40
2. "L.A. Song (Out of This Town)" (album version) – 3:55

Australian CD single

1. "L.A. Song (Out of This Town)" (album version) – 3:56
2. "L.A. Song (Out of This Town)" (remix edit) – 3:56
3. "Am I the One?" – 6:37

== Charts ==
=== Weekly charts ===
Chart (1999–2000)	Peak position
Canada Top Singles (RPM)	37
Canada Adult Contemporary (RPM)	48
Netherlands (Dutch Top 40)	31
Netherlands (Single Top 100)	66
New Zealand (Recorded Music NZ)	1
US Billboard Hot 100	90
US Adult Pop Airplay (Billboard)	7

=== Year-end charts ===
Chart (1999)	Position
US Adult Top 40 (Billboard)	90

Chart (2000)	Position
New Zealand (RIANZ)	47
US Adult Top 40 (Billboard)	38
