= 37 Days (album) =

Studio album by Beth Hart
- Released: 2007
- Genre: Rock
- Length: 62:40
- Label: Universal
- Producer: Beth Hart

Beth Hart chronology
| Live at Paradiso (2005) | 37 Days (2007) | My California (2010) |

37 Days is an album by American singer Beth Hart released in parts of Europe in 2007, followed in the UK in 2008. A DVD version of the album is also available, where each track is played to synced pro-shot video footage of that given song being recorded in studio. The UK version of the CD release contains live bonus tracks of "LA Song," "Learning to Live," and "Leave the Light On" tacked on at the end of the disc. The track "Soul Shine" is a cover of the song "Soulshine", originally written by Allman Brothers guitarist Warren Haynes.

The album name, 37 Days, refers to how long it took to record the album.

== Track listing ==
| No. | Title | Length |
|---|---|---|
| 1. | "Good as It Gets" | 3:57 |
| 2. | "Jealousy" | 4:29 |
| 3. | "One Eyed Chicken" | 4:52 |
| 4. | "Over You" | 4:19 |
| 5. | "Sick" | 4:37 |
| 6. | "Face Forward" | 2:45 |
| 7. | "Soul Shine" | 4:31 |
| 8. | "Forever Young" | 4:10 |
| 9. | "Easy" | 6:04 |
| 10. | "Heaven Look Down" | 3:20 |
| 11. | "Missing You" | 4:31 |
| 12. | "Waterfalls" | 3:53 |
| 13. | "Crashing Down" | 6:19 |
| 14. | "At the Bottom" | 4:53 |

== Charts ==
| Chart (2007) | Peak position |
|---|---|
| Denmark Albums Chart | 1 |
| Netherlands Albums Top 100 | 14 |
| Norwegian Album Charts | 18 |

== Certifications ==
| Region | Certification | Certified units/sales |
|---|---|---|
| Denmark (IFPI Danmark) | Gold | 15,000^{^} |
^{^} Shipments figures based on certification alone.
