= Beth Hart =

American blues rock musician (born 1972)

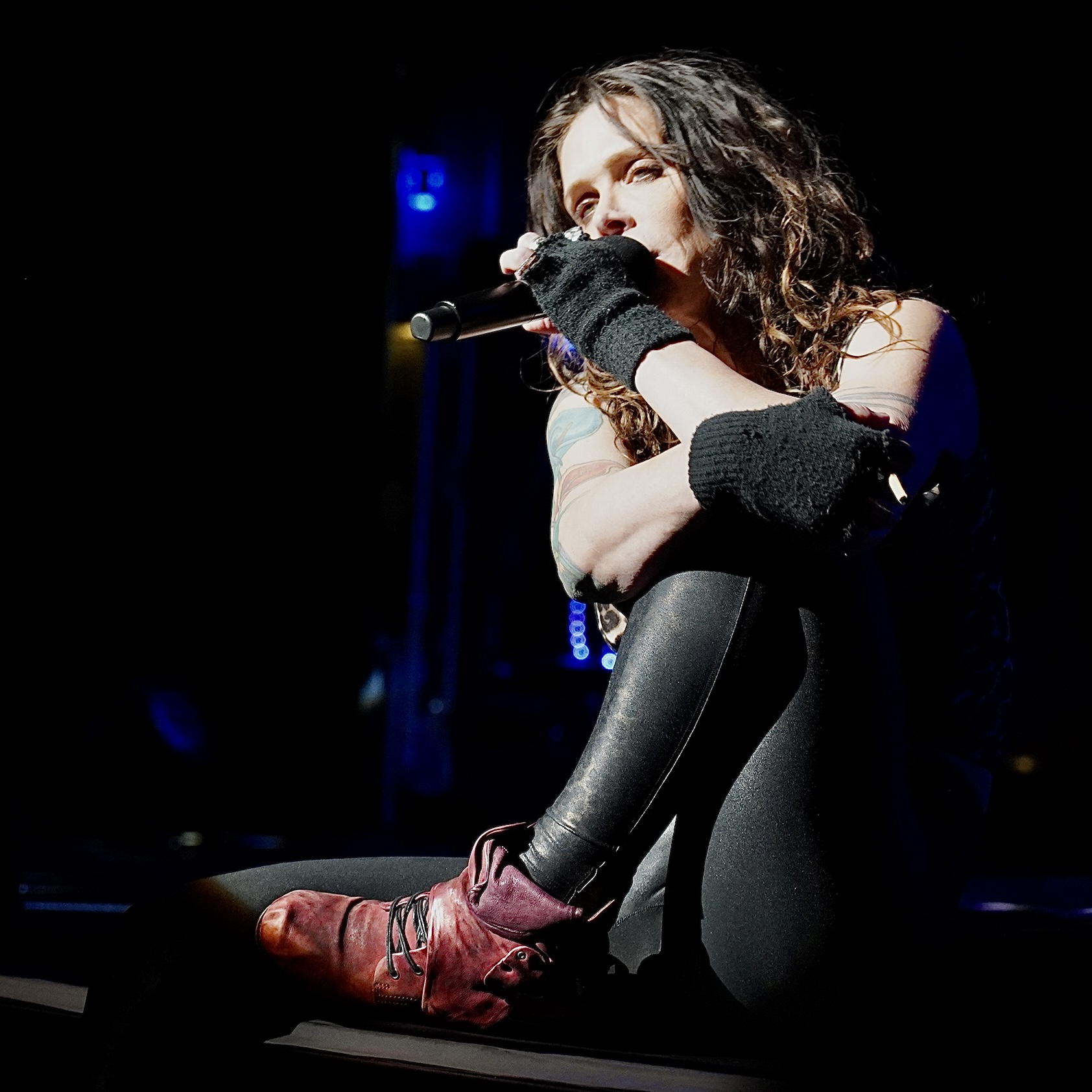
- Hart in 2022

Background information
- Born: January 24, 1972 (age 54); Los Angeles, California, US
- Genres: Blues; Blues rock; Rock; Jazz; Soul
- Occupations: Musician; singer; composer
- Instruments: Vocals; piano; guitar; bass guitar; cello; percussion
- Labels: 143; Lava; Atlantic; Koch; Provogue
- Website: bethhart.com

Beth Hart (born January 24, 1972) is an American musician from Los Angeles, California. She rose to fame with the release of her 1999 single "L.A. Song (Out of This Town)" from her second album Screamin' for My Supper. The single was a number one hit in New Zealand, as well as reaching the top five of the US Adult Contemporary and Top 10 on the Billboard Adult Top 40 charts.

Hart has had several well received collaborations with guitarist Joe Bonamassa, beginning with Don't Explain (2011), followed with the Grammy-nominated Seesaw (2013) and Live in Amsterdam (2014). Live in Amsterdam topped the Billboard Blues Album Chart, a chart that she has reached six times. Her latest work with Bonamassa was the 2018 album Black Coffee. Hart has had two number one singles in Denmark, "As Good as It Gets" and "Learning to Live", and a double platinum-selling album, Leave the Light On.

== Early life and education ==
Hart was born and raised in Los Angeles, California. As a four-year-old, she began to play piano. At first, she concentrated on classical works by Bach and Beethoven, but as she grew older, she also began to play pieces by artists such as Etta James, Otis Redding and Led Zeppelin.

Regarding her childhood in an interview with Don Wilcock, Hart stated, "When I was a kid, my dad left me in a bad way, and what fucked me up the most was that he would be in the lives of my other sisters and brothers, but he wouldn't be in mine." At the age of 22, Hart lost her sister from complications of AIDS.

Hart entered Los Angeles' High School for the Performing Arts in 10th grade as a vocal and cello major. At the prompting of a classmate, she soon began singing during open mic nights in the Belly Room of the Comedy Store.

== Career ==
=== Beginning years (1987–1998) ===
Hart started playing clubs in Hollywood at the age of 15, and eventually enlisted bassist Tal Herzberg and guitarist Jimmy Khoury for Beth Hart and the Ocean of Souls, which was recorded in 1993. It includes "Am I the One" (which later appeared on her first official record Immortal) and a pop-rock cover of the Beatles' "Lucy in the Sky with Diamonds". The first released album with the Beth Hart Band, Immortal, was released in 1996 through Atlantic, scanning 13,000 copies and featured the single "God Bless You". It also included "Am I the One", that ended up on her first DVD that was released in 2005. After touring the record, including at Lollapalooza in 1996, the Beth Hart Band disbanded due to infighting.

In 1993, Hart appeared on Ed McMahon's Star Search, ultimately winning the Female Vocalist competition. Hart has stated that winning the show did not land her a record deal due to the stigma associated with performing on the show, and that she had burned through the prize money she received by the time she struck a deal with Atlantic Records.

=== Commercial breakthrough (1999–2009) ===
Hart's second solo album, Screamin' for My Supper was released in 1999, and featured "L.A. Song (Out of This Town)", a number one hit in New Zealand, as well as a Top 10 Adult Contemporary chart hit in the US. The song also aired during Episode 17 of the 10th and final season of Beverly Hills, 90210. At the same time, Hart was singing the lead role in Love, Janis, an off-Broadway musical based on Joplin's letters home to her mother.

Hart's follow-up album, Leave the Light On, was released in 2003 via Koch Records, after being dropped by Atlantic presumably due to Hart's drug addiction. While still successful in New Zealand, the album saw her breakthrough in the European market, with the single "Learning to Live" reaching number one in Denmark, while the album achieved a two× Platinum certification. "Learning to Live" was also used as the theme song to Losing It with Jillian on NBC. In 2003, she became the first and only musician to feature as backing vocalist for a Deep Purple song ("Haunted", released on the Bananas album).

Two years later in 2005, Hart released her first live album, Live at Paradiso, which was recorded at a former church in Amsterdam, and released both as a CD and a DVD. It featured a variety of Hart's self written songs and a cover of "Whole Lotta Love" by Led Zeppelin. Hart appears on Toots Thielemans' album One More For the Road on the track "I Gotta Right To Sing The Blues", which was released in 2006.

Hart's fourth solo studio album 37 Days was released in Europe in July 2007, and eventually as a DVD as well. The album debuted at number one in Denmark and spent two weeks at the top, her first album to top a national chart, and additionally reached a Gold certification in the country. The record was her last on a major label (Universal), though it solidified her European commercial success.

=== Independent albums and collaborations with Joe Bonamassa (2010–2014) ===
Her fifth solo studio album My California was released in 2010, and was her first on Provogue Records. Hart delivered music for the final scene of the last episode of season 6 of Californication, with the title song of the record. On August 23, 2012, her song "Take It Easy on Me" from My California was used in the first episode of the eighth series of the BBC TV drama Waterloo Road. On July 31, 2012, the album was released in the United States. On the same date, she released an EP titled Introducing Beth Hart.

During this time, Hart collaborated with Slash on "Mother Maria", released on the iTunes version of Slash's 2010 solo album, Slash. Additionally, Hart collaborated with rapper Born on his single "It Hurts", released in February 2012. Following her tour with Jeff Beck in 2006 through the United States, she appeared with him again in December 2012, at the Kennedy Center Opera House, along with a group of blues/rock musicians, performing "I'd Rather Go Blind" in tribute to Buddy Guy, who received a 2012 Kennedy Center Honor for his lifetime of contributions to American culture. The performance received a standing ovation from President Obama and First Lady Michelle Obama, and led to the collaboration with Buddy Guy, where he recorded the song "What You Gonna Do About Me" with Hart for his album Rhythm & Blues.

In 2011, Hart collaborated with blues guitarist Joe Bonamassa on their first co-release Don't Explain, an album of blues and soul classics. The album reached number three on the Billboard Blues Album Chart and also went gold in the Netherlands. She additionally provided vocals for the track "No Love on the Street" on Bonamassa's Dust Bowl, which was released the same year.

The following year, Hart's release Bang Bang Boom Boom became one of her biggest commercial successes, appearing on the charts of at least 10 countries, as well as becoming her first to chart on the Billboard Blues Album Chart, climbing to number three. She worked with producer Kevin Shirley, whom she collaborated with for the first time on the album Don't Explain. The album was released the following year in the United States.

In 2013, Hart and Bonamassa released Seesaw, again produced by Kevin Shirley. A song from the album, "Miss Lady", originally recorded by the Buddy Miles Express was released in Europe on Provogue PRD 7414 4. The album rose to number eight on the Billboard Top Independent Album Chart. In 2014, Hart was nominated for a Grammy Award for Seesaw and was also nominated for a Blues Music Award in the category Best Contemporary Blues Female Artist. The album additionally holds her highest peak position on the Billboard 200, reaching the Top 50.

Hart's second live album/DVD, Live in Amsterdam, was also recorded in Amsterdam, this time at the Royal Carré Theatre. Hart and Bonamassa went on a mini European tour of five shows (Bergen, Norway – London, UK – Antwerp, Belgium – Amsterdam, Netherlands), of which two were at the Carré Theatre.

In 2014, she performed once again with Jeff Beck, this time during his Australian tour as a supporting act, in addition to joining him on stage during his set.

=== Better Than Home, Fire on the Floor, Black Coffee & War in My Mind (2015–2019) ===
Hart's seventh solo studio album Better Than Home, was released on April 13, 2015, in Europe and on the following day in the US. The recording process was "painful" for Hart: the album was produced by Michael Stevens, whose cancer diagnosis pressured Hart into completing the recording of the album in just five days. In addition to this, she entered a psych ward twice while making the album. Nevertheless, the lead single "Mechanical Heart" charted at number one in the "iTunes Blues" song list, and the album entered the albums chart in the Netherlands at number one. In the US the album entered both the Billboard Blues Chart and iTunes Blues Chart at number one. The album also charted in other countries: number 11 in Germany and 33 in the UK. On January 29, 2016, Hart and Jeff Beck released the single "Tell Her You Belong To Me" worldwide on iTunes, after performing the song live on Jools' Annual Hootenanny in 2015/2016 on BBC Two. They also performed "Nutbush City Limits" on the show. At the end of 2015, Mojo magazine ranked the album as the fourth best blues album of the year, while Hart appeared as one of the narrators for the documentary film Unity.

Hart released her eighth studio album, Fire on the Floor, on October 14, 2016, in Europe, New Zealand and Australia. For the rest of the world it was released on February 3, 2017, to coincide with her tour. Hart wrote all songs herself, except for "Let's Get Together" (with Rune Westberg) and "Fat Man" (with Glen Burtnik). The title track was released first followed by "Love Is a Lie", which is the official first single off the album.

On January 26, 2018, Hart and Bonamassa released Black Coffee, again produced by Kevin Shirley. The album debuted at number one on the Billboard Blues Chart, and also in the Dutch album top 100.

On November 30, 2018, Hart released a live concert recording, Live at the Royal Albert Hall, as a video release and a live album on Provogue Records/Mascot Label Group. The recordings were captured in May 2018 when she performed at the Royal Albert Hall.

Hart released her ninth solo studio album, War in My Mind, on September 27, 2019, through Provogue/Mascot Label Group. The album became her highest-charting solo album in a number of European markets, including the UK where it reached the Top 20, as well as Germany, where it hit the Top 10.

=== A Tribute to Led Zeppelin and recent projects (2020–present) ===
In 2021, Hart began teasing new music by hiding hints in her Spotify canvas videos. On November 12, she announced her tenth solo studio album, A Tribute to Led Zeppelin, alongside the first single, a cover of "Good Times Bad Times." The album was released on February 25, 2022, debuting at number one in the Netherlands and became her highest charting solo album in Germany, Austria, Switzerland, and the United Kingdom.

== Artistry ==
Hart is known for her "visceral", "gritty", "soaring" and "dynamic" contralto vocals. Hart also plays piano, guitar, cello, bass guitar and percussion.

Describing his collaborator's performance at Blue Balls Festival in Switzerland, Joe Bonamassa told Music Radar: "I was totally knocked out by Beth. Here's this lady who's acting like I'm the cool one, and meanwhile I'm thinking, Man, she's got it all. She's the new Janis Joplin, Tina Turner - the real deal, you know?"

American pop singer Miley Cyrus lists Hart amongst her favorite singers of all time. In 2013, she told Billboard, "she's got one of the best voices, I feel like, of all time."

== Personal life ==
Hart resides in the Silver Lake District of Los Angeles and has been married to her road manager Scott Guetzkow since March 15, 2001. David Wolff had been her manager since 1994. Hart has struggled with drug addiction and bipolar disorder, but has been sober for a number of years, finding religion and practicing transcendental meditation.

== Awards and nominations ==
At the 56th Annual Grammy Awards, Hart received a nomination for Best Blues Album with Seesaw, ultimately losing to Ben Harper and Charlie Musselwhite's Get Up!. Hart has been nominated at the Blues Music Awards for six consecutive years, ultimately winning the "Instrumentalist - Vocals" category in 2018.

| Year | Ceremony | Award | Nominated work | Result | Ref. |
|---|---|---|---|---|---|
| 2012 | Blues Music Awards | Contemporary Blues Album | Don't Explain | Nominated | |
| 2014 | Blues Music Awards | Contemporary Blues Female Artist of the Year | Herself | Nominated | |
| 2014 | Grammy Awards | Best Blues Album | Seesaw | Nominated | |
| 2014 | Blues Blast Awards | Female Blues Artist | Herself | Won | |
| 2015 | Blues Music Awards | Contemporary Blues Female Artist of the Year | Herself | Nominated | |
| 2016 | Blues Music Awards | Contemporary Blues Female Artist of the Year | Herself | Nominated | |
| 2016 | European Blues Awards | Best Album | Fire on the Floor | Won | |
| 2017 | Blues Blast Awards | Female Blues Artist | Herself | Won | |
| 2017 | European Blues Awards | Best Female Vocalist | Herself | Won | |
| 2018 | Blues Music Awards | Contemporary Blues Female Artist of the Year | Herself | Nominated | |
| 2018 | Blues Music Awards | Contemporary Blues Album of the Year | Fire on the Floor | Nominated | |
| 2018 | Blues Music Awards | Instrumentalist – Vocals | Herself | Won | |
| 2018 | Blues Blast Awards | Female Blues Artist | Herself | Won | |
| 2018 | European Blues Awards | Best Female Vocalist | Herself | Won | |
| 2019 | Blues Blast Awards | Best Live Recording | Live At Royal Albert Hall | Nominated | |
| 2019 | Blues Music Awards | Instrumentalist – Vocals | Herself | Nominated | |
| 2019 | Blues Music Awards | Contemporary Blues Female Artist | Herself | Nominated | |
| 2019 | Blues Music Awards | B.B King Entertainer of the Year | Herself | Nominated | |
| 2020 | Blues Blast Awards | Female Blues Artist | Herself | Won | |
| 2022 | Blues Blast Awards | Blues Rock Album | Herself | Nominated | |
| 2022 | Blues Blast Awards | Vocalist | Herself | Won | |
| 2022 | Blues Blast Awards | Female Blues Artist | Herself | Won | |
| 2022 | Planet Rock Awards 2022 | Blues Power Award | A Tribute to Led Zeppelin | Nominated | |
| 2023 | Blues Music Awards | Contemporary Blues Female Artist | Herself | Nominated | |
| 2024 | Blues Music Awards | B.B. King Entertainer of the Year | Herself | Nominated | |
| 2025 | UK Blues Awards | International Blues Artist of the Year | Herself | Won | |
| 2025 | Blues Music Awards | Contemporary Blues Female Artist | Herself | Nominated | |
| 2025 | Blues Music Awards | Instrumentalist – Vocals | Herself | Nominated | |

== Discography ==
- Beth Hart and the Ocean of Souls (1993)
- Immortal (1996)
- Screamin' for My Supper (1999)
- Leave the Light On (2003)
- 37 Days (2007)
- My California (2010)
- Don't Explain (with Joe Bonamassa; 2011)
- Bang Bang Boom Boom (2012)
- Seesaw (with Joe Bonamassa; 2013)
- Better Than Home (2015)
- Fire on the Floor (2016)
- Black Coffee (with Joe Bonamassa; 2018)
- War in My Mind (2019)
- A Tribute to Led Zeppelin (2022)
- You Still Got Me (2024)
