= Black Country Communion discography =

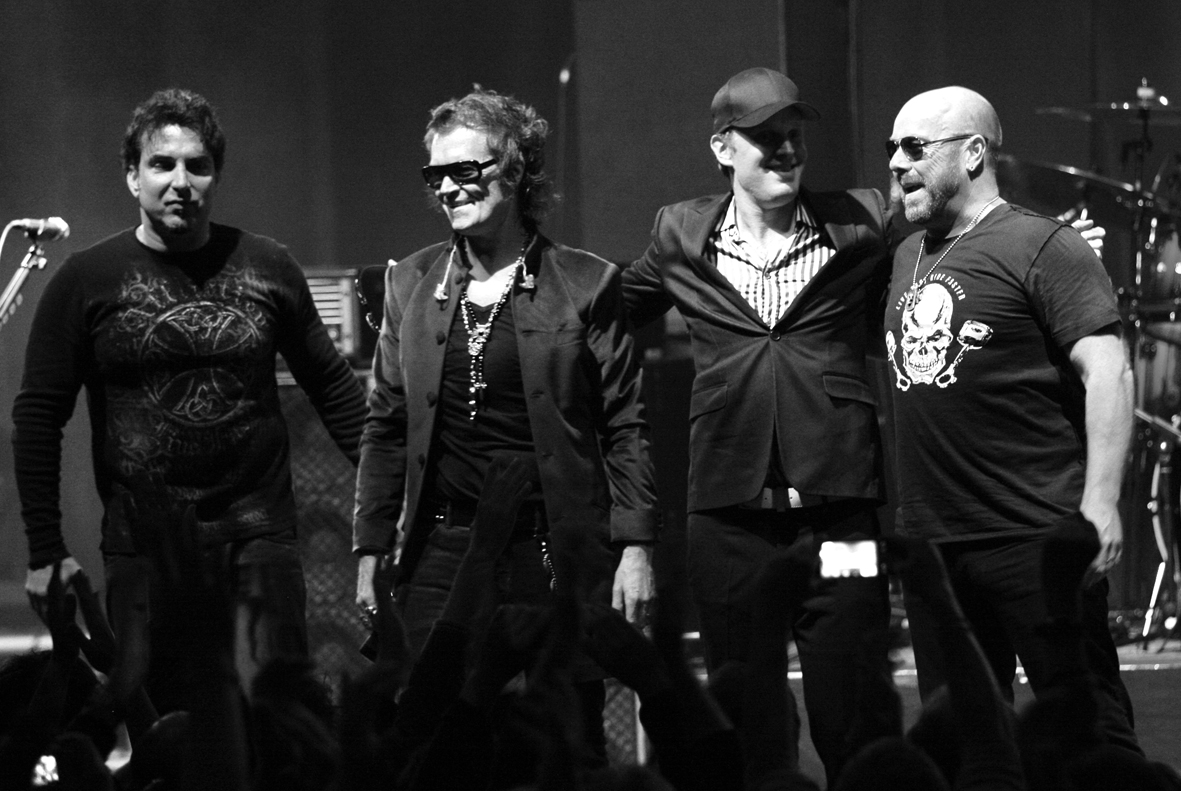
- Black Country Communion in 2011. From left to right: Derek Sherinian, Glenn Hughes, Joe Bonamassa and Jason Bonham.
- Studio albums: 5
- Live albums: 1
- Singles: 5
- Video albums: 1
- Music videos: 9

The discography of Black Country Communion, an English-American hard rock band, consists of five studio albums, one live album, four singles, one video album and nine music videos. Formed in Los Angeles, California in 2009, Black Country Communion is a supergroup composed of bassist and vocalist Glenn Hughes, guitarist and vocalist Joe Bonamassa, drummer Jason Bonham and keyboardist Derek Sherinian. Working with producer Kevin Shirley, the band released its self-titled debut album through J&R Adventures and Mascot Records in September 2010. The album reached number 54 on the Billboard 200, number 13 on the UK Albums Chart, the top 20 of the US Billboard Hard Rock Albums and Top Rock Albums charts, and topped the UK Rock & Metal Albums Chart.

The following year, the group quickly returned with Black Country Communion 2, which reached number 71 on the Billboard 200, number 23 on the UK Albums Chart, the top 20 of both Billboard rock albums charts, and topped the UK Rock & Metal Albums Chart. A music video was released for the track "Man in the Middle", which was directed by Davin Maske. Later in 2011, the band released its first video album Live Over Europe, recorded during a European tour that year, which reached the top ten of the UK Music Video Chart and in several other European regions. Live Over Europe was released as a live album in February 2012, reaching number 23 on the US Hard Rock Albums chart, number 110 on the UK Albums Chart, and number two on the UK Rock & Metal Albums Chart.

In October 2012, the band released its third studio album Afterglow, which reached the top 50 of the Billboard 200 and number two on the UK Rock & Metal Albums Chart. In March 2013, Bonamassa left Black Country Communion due to internal tensions with Hughes, with the bassist later confirming that the band had ended. However, in April 2016 it was announced that Black Country Communion planned to reunite and return in 2017 with a new studio album, with Hughes and Bonamassa beginning songwriting later in September. BCCIV was released in September 2017, preceded by the single and music video for "Collide". The album was the band's first to reach the top ten of the UK Albums Chart, debuting at number 7. It reached number 102 on the US Billboard 200.

== Albums ==
=== Studio albums ===
List of studio albums, with selected chart positions
Title	Album details	Peak chart positions									
Title	Album details	US	AUT	FRA	GER	NED	NOR	SCO	SWE	SWI	UK
Black Country Communion	Released: September 20, 2010; Label: Mascot, J&R Adventures; Formats: CD, 2LP, CD+DVD, DL	54	50	62	15	32	—	15	19	54	13
Black Country Communion 2	Released: June 13, 2011; Labels: Mascot, J&R Adventures; Formats: CD, 2LP, DL	71	17	118	7	56	26	18	24	15	23
Afterglow	Released: October 29, 2012; Labels: Mascot, J&R Adventures; Formats: CD, 2LP, CD+DVD, DL	48	19	63	9	32	24	24	18	44	29
BCCIV	Released: September 22, 2017; Labels: Mascot, J&R Adventures; Formats: CD, 2LP, DL, streaming	102	12	83	6	29	33	5	32	5	7
V	Released: June 14, 2024; Label: J&R Adventures; Formats: DL, streaming	—	15	—	11	13	—	7	—	7	58
"—" denotes a release that did not chart in that region.

=== Live albums ===
List of live albums, with selected chart positions
Title	Album details	Peak chart positions							
Title	Album details	US Hard	US Indie	BEL (WA)	GER	UK	UK Indie	UK Phys.	UK Rock
Live Over Europe	Released: February 27, 2012; Labels: Mascot, J&R Adventures; Formats: 2CD, 2LP, DL	23	44	100	56	110	15	80	2

== Singles ==
List of singles, showing year released and album name
Title	Year	Album
"Collide"	2017	BCCIV
"With You I Go"	2024	Non-album single
"Stay Free"	2024	V
"Red Sun"	2024	V
"Enlightened"	2024	V

== Other charted songs ==
List of charted songs, with selected chart positions, showing year released and album name
Title	Year	Peak	Album
Title	Year	US Heri.	Album
"Black Country"	2010	27	Black Country Communion

== Videos ==
=== Video albums ===
List of video albums, with selected chart positions
Title	Album details	Peak chart positions								
Title	Album details	AUT	DEN	FIN	GER	NED	NOR	SWE	SWI	UK
Live Over Europe	Released: October 24, 2011; Labels: Mascot, J&R Adventures; Formats: 2DVD, BD	5	5	4	28	7	5	1	9	8

=== Music videos ===
List of music videos, showing year released and director(s)
Title	Year	Director(s)	Ref.
"The Great Divide"	2010	Jeff Warden, Kahlil Hudson	
"Man in the Middle"	2011	Davin Maske	
"Afterglow"	2012	Marcus Sweeney-Bird	
"Confessor"	2012	Marcus Sweeney-Bird	
"Midnight Sun"	2012	Marcus Sweeney-Bird	
"This Is Your Time"	2012	Marcus Sweeney-Bird	
"Collide"	2017	Philippe Klose	
"The Last Song for My Resting Place"	2017	Philippe Klose	
"Over My Head"	2017	Philippe Klose	
"Sway"	2017	Philippe Klose	
"Wanderlust"	2018	Philippe Klose	
"Love Remains"	2018	Philippe Klose	
