= Afterglow (Black Country Communion album) =

Studio album by Black Country Communion
- Released: October 29, 2012
- Recorded: June 2012
- Studios: Revolver Recording (Thousand Oaks, California)
- Genres: Hard rock; blues rock
- Length: 57:50
- Labels: Mascot; J&R Adventures
- Producer: Kevin Shirley

Black Country Communion chronology
Live Over Europe (2011)	Afterglow (2012)	BCCIV (2017)

Afterglow is the third studio album by English–American hard rock band Black Country Communion. Recorded over a five-day period in mid-June 2012 at Revolver Recording in Thousand Oaks, California, it was produced by Kevin Shirley and released in Europe by Mascot Records on October 29, 2012, and in North America by J&R Adventures the next day. The album reached number 29 on the UK Albums Chart and number 48 on the US Billboard 200.

After touring in promotion of Black Country Communion 2 in the summer of 2011, the band took a break as members focused on their respective solo projects. Frontman Glenn Hughes spent around six months writing material for a planned solo album, which later became the basis for a third Black Country Communion release. Recording for the album took place over just five days, which was due in part to guitarist Joe Bonamassa's busy solo touring schedule.

Afterglow received generally positive reviews from critics, some of whom suggested that the truncated recording process made the album feel more spontaneous. Commercially, the album was the band's first to break into the top 50 of the Billboard 200, as well as their highest-charting on the Billboard Top Rock Albums chart at number 14 (this was later equalled by BCCIV). Afterglow was the band's last release before their initial breakup in March 2013.

== Writing and recording ==
Shortly after the release of Black Country Communion 2, it was reported that Black Country Communion (BCC) frontman Glenn Hughes planned to start writing material for a new solo album during December 2011 and January 2012, which he claimed would "portray the image of the Glenn Hughes on the [BCC] albums". However, the songs written during this period were ultimately adapted for a third BCC album, with the other band members brought in later to finalise the compositions.

In an interview with Guitar World published in March 2012, Hughes noted that he'd been writing new material for around six months, compared with six weeks for the first album and four months for the second. Regarding his bandmates' involvement in the process, he explained that "With each album, I go into my place and write the majority of the music, then I take it in to Joe [Bonamassa] and Kevin [Shirley] and we make the songs more 'band sounding'," as well as claiming that "I've been left as the keeper of the keys to write these albums" due to Bonamassa's busy solo schedule. Hughes is credited with lyrics on every song (drummer Jason Bonham is a co-writer on two tracks), with all band members (and Shirley) credited with various musical composition credits.

Asked about the style of the material prior to recording, Hughes described it as "kind of a continuation ... there's going to be some darker stuff on there because I'm writing it kind of dark, so there might be some moments of drama in there – I like drama in the music". Studio sessions for Afterglow started on June 10, 2012. The first day consisted of pre-production by Hughes, Bonamassa and Shirley, with Bonham and keyboardist Derek Sherinian joining them to start recording proper the next day. According to Hughes, the band was scheduled to complete recording in ten days over two weeks; however, he claimed that Bonamassa was "knackered" due to his recent solo touring, which led Shirley to reduce the process to just five days (although the frontman finished some of his vocals later on during mixing).

== Release and aftermath ==
Afterglow was officially announced on August 24, 2012, with the track listing revealed the following week. The first song to be released from the album was "Confessor", which received its premiere on Planet Rock on September 11, ahead of being made available as a free digital download around a week later. Prior to the album's release, the band also issued six videos online documenting the recording of the album. Afterglow was released in the UK and Europe by Mascot Records on October 29, 2012, and in North America by Bonamassa's own label J&R Adventures the following day.

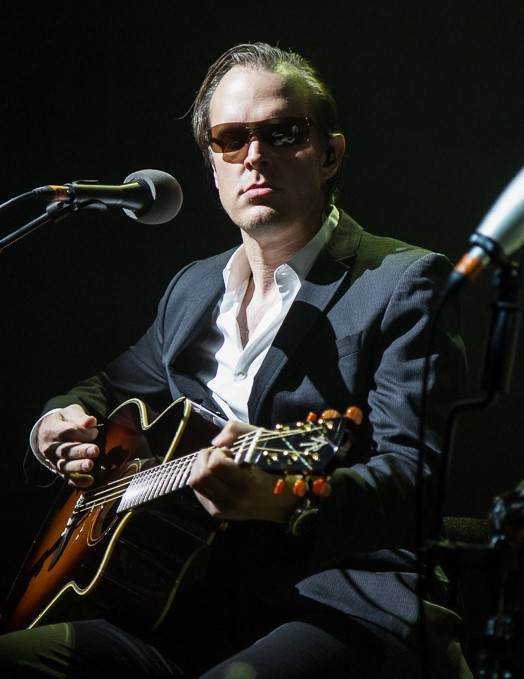
BCC frontman Glenn Hughes blamed guitarist Joe Bonamassa's (pictured) busy solo touring schedule for the band's lack of live performances in promotion of Afterglow.

In promotion of the album, BCC announced a single show to take place at the Wolverhampton Civic Hall on January 5, 2013. This was due to be filmed for a live video release later in the year. Both Hughes and Bonham expressed frustration over the lack of additional shows following the album's release: the former directly cited Bonamassa's busy solo touring schedule as the reason for a lack of BCC shows, and proclaimed that "If I had my way we'd be doing mass touring", while the latter reflected that "It is kinda sad that we do this product, then when it comes to touring there's no plans ... I'm not blaming anybody in particular — but we should tour ... Certain powers-that-be are holding us back". In September 2012, Hughes suggested that Afterglow could be the band's final album due to Bonamassa's "heavy commitments".

The day after the show in Wolverhampton went on sale, it was abruptly cancelled due to what were reported as "unforeseen circumstances". Bonamassa claimed after the cancellation that he had refused to play the show as he was worried Hughes might "make some stupid fucking announcement on stage" in relation to whether the band would continue or disband. Tensions between the two continued, with Bonamassa later claiming that "three years ago when this thing started, everybody had day jobs ... I tour the spring and the fall, religiously. And I'm not gonna be bullied into doing something". The guitarist's manager Roy Weisman later confirmed Hughes' suggestion that the Wolverhampton show had been pulled due to disagreements over ticket prices, which the BCC frontman had earlier claimed online.

Due to the ongoing disputes between Hughes and Bonamassa, Bonham suggested that the band could tour in promotion of Afterglow with a temporary stand-in guitarist. By March 2013, Bonamassa had officially left the band, describing himself as "happily not involved any more", but suggested that the remaining members could continue with a replacement. Shortly thereafter, however, Hughes claimed that the guitarist had prevented the band from continuing under the same name, promising that he, Bonham and Sherinian would return later with a new moniker. Hughes and Bonham briefly performed as California Breed and BCC eventually reformed in 2016.

== Reception ==
=== Commercial ===
Afterglow debuted at number 48 on the US Billboard 200 (the band's first album to break the top 50 of the chart), selling over 8,500 copies in its first week. It also registered at number 5 on the Hard Rock Albums chart (the band's first top-five entry), number 8 on the Independent Albums chart, and number 14 on the Top Rock Albums chart (the band's joint top-highest position). In the UK, the album debuted at number 29 on the UK Albums Chart, number 24 on the Scottish Albums Chart, number 2 on the UK Rock & Metal Albums Chart (the band's first studio album not to top the chart), and number 8 on the UK Independent Albums Chart. It also reached number 9 in Germany, number 18 in Sweden, number 19 in Austria, number 24 in Norway, number 32 in the Netherlands, number 44 in Switzerland, number 63 in France, number 73 in the Wallonia region of Belgium, number 87 in the Flanders region of Belgium, and number 98 in Ireland.

=== Critical ===
Professional ratings
Review scores
Source	Rating
AllMusic	4/5 stars
Bass Guitar	4/5 stars
Classic Rock	8/10
Guitarist	4/5 stars
Metal Hammer	8/10
Metro	3/5
Powerplay	10/10
Ultimate Guitar	7.7/10

Media response to Afterglow was generally positive. Classic Rock awarded the album a rating of 8/10, with writer Malcolm Dome dubbing it "easily the most cohesive and exciting album from the band" due to a "spontaneity and dynamic" resulting from the short time spent recording. Metal Hammer gave Afterglow the same 8/10 rating, with reviewer Dave Ling suggesting that "One listen to songs like 'Confessor' and 'This Is Your Time' and you'll be drawn in; repeated spins will lead to addiction." Powerplay gave the album a full 10/10 rating, with writer Chris Kee describing it as "a great, great album that I firmly believe should be revered through the decades to come, held up as one of the finest rock albums of our times". In a four-star review for Stereoboard.com, Simon Ramsay called Afterglow the band's "most accessible album to date". Nick Coleman of The Independent hailed the album as "a hue and cry against laziness and the path of least resistance".

In a review for AllMusic, Eduardo Rivadavia awarded the album three and a half out of five stars – slightly lower than the four stars afforded to both previous BCC releases, which he credited to "a disappointing, second-half quality drop-off". Despite this, the reviewer praised the contributions of all four band members: Hughes' "incomparable voice", Bonamassa's "versatile guitar licks", Bonham's "ever powerful, spot-on drumming" and Sherinian's "always tasteful keyboards". Similarly, in a 3/5 review, British newspaper Metro wrote that the album is "at its strongest when it resembles Led Zeppelin in their pomp", but claimed that "Too often, BCC fall into their default mode, which is shrieking cock rock with machine-gun drums, which doesn't endear them to many outside the metal faithful."

At the end of the year, Afterglow was named in the Blues Rock Review's list of "Top 20 Albums of 2012", at number 18, with writer Don Tice stating: "With the timeless sound of Hughes on the mic, the classy blues swagger of Bonamassa on guitar, one of a kind flare from Sherinian on keys, and a star child by birthright, backed by immense talent in Bonham, Black Country Communion pries the lid off the past, and propels it into the now." American music historian and radio personality Eddie Trunk named it his seventh best album of the year, calling it "pretty much live and in your face classic sounding rock that just happens to be from a new band".

== Track listing ==
Afterglow track listing
No.	Title	Lyrics	Music	Length
1.	"Big Train"	Glenn Hughes	Hughes	4:17
2.	"This Is Your Time"	Jason Bonham, Hughes	Bonham, Joe Bonamassa, Derek Sherinian	4:32
3.	"Midnight Sun"	Hughes	Bonham, Bonamassa, Sherinian	5:17
4.	"Confessor"	Hughes	Hughes	5:08
5.	"Cry Freedom"	Hughes	Hughes, Bonham, Bonamassa, Sherinian	5:09
6.	"Afterglow"	Hughes	Hughes	6:06
7.	"Dandelion"	Hughes	Hughes	4:02
8.	"The Circle"	Hughes	Hughes	7:01
9.	"Common Man"	Bonham, Hughes	Bonham	5:26
10.	"The Giver"	Hughes	Hughes, Bonamassa, Kevin Shirley	5:23
11.	"Crawl"	Hughes	Bonamassa, Bonham, Hughes, Shirley	5:30
Total length:				57:51

Limited edition bonus DVD track listing
No.	Title	Length
1.	"Making of Afterglow"	45:00
2.	"Afterglow" (music video)	5:59
3.	"This Is Your Time" (music video)	4:33
4.	"Confessor" (music video)	5:12
5.	"Midnight Sun" (music video)	4:42
Total length:		65:26

== Personnel ==
Black Country Communion

- Glenn Hughes – bass, lead vocals, acoustic guitar (track 10), liner notes
- Joe Bonamassa – guitar, vocals (co-lead on track 4)
- Jason Bonham – drums, percussion, backing vocals (track 2)
- Derek Sherinian – keyboards

Additional personnel

- Jeff Bova – orchestration (track 6)
- Kevin Shirley – production, mixing
- Jared Kvitka – engineering
- Josh LaCount – engineering assistance
- Bob Ludwig – mastering
- Dennis Friel – design, illustration
- Marcus Bird – photography, video direction
- Christie Goodwin – photography

== Charts ==
Chart performance for Afterglow
Chart (2012)	Peak position
Austrian Albums (Ö3 Austria Top 40)	19
Belgian Albums (Ultratop Flanders)	87
Belgian Albums (Ultratop Wallonia)	73
Dutch Albums (MegaCharts)	32
French Albums (SNEP)	63
German Albums (Offizielle Top 100)	9
Irish Albums (IRMA)	98
Norwegian Albums (VG-lista)	24
Scottish Albums (OCC)	24
Swedish Albums (Sverigetopplistan)	18
Swiss Albums (Schweizer Hitparade)	44
UK Albums (OCC)	29
UK Album Downloads (OCC)	71
UK Independent Albums (OCC)	8
UK Physical Albums (OCC)	24
UK Record Store (OCC)	7
UK Rock & Metal Albums (OCC)	2
US Billboard 200	48
US Hard Rock Albums (Billboard)	5
US Independent Albums (Billboard)	8
US Top Rock Albums (Billboard)	14
