= Live Over Europe =

Live Over Europe may refer to:

- Live Over Europe (DVD), a 2008 DVD by Axel Rudi Pell
- Live Over Europe (Black Country Communion album)
- Live Over Europe!, an album by Bonfire
- Live over Europe 2007, an album by Genesis
