= V (Black Country Communion album) =

- Cover art by Hugh Syme

Studio album by Black Country Communion
- Released: June 14, 2024
- Recorded: 2023
- Studio: Sunset Sound Recorders (Hollywood, Los Angeles)
- Genre: Hard rock; blues rock
- Length: 50:36
- Label: J&R Adventures
- Producer: Kevin Shirley

Black Country Communion chronology
BCCIV (2017)	V (2024)

Singles from V
- 1. "Stay Free" Released: March 1, 2024; 2. "Red Sun" Released: April 5, 2024; 3. "Enlighten" Released: May 3, 2024

V (Roman numeral for five) is the fifth studio album by English–American hard rock band Black Country Communion. Recorded in 2023 at Sunset Sound Recorders in Hollywood, California, it was produced by Kevin Shirley and released on June 14, 2024, by J&R Adventures. The album is the band's least commercially successful in both the UK and the US, peaking at number 58 on the UK Albums Chart and failing to register on the US Billboard 200 – the group's first album to do so.

Writing for V started shortly after the release of Black Country Communion's fourth album, BCCIV, in 2017. However, production was delayed several times due to the individual band members' busy schedules with other projects, as well as the COVID-19 pandemic starting in 2020. Recording eventually took place during the summer of 2023. Ahead of the album's release, the tracks "Stay Free", "Red Sun" and "Enlighten" were issued as singles between March and May 2024.

V received generally positive reviews from critics, many of whom praised the individual contributions of each band member, as well as the group's chemistry. Commercially, the album performed poorly in the US, failing to chart on the Billboard 200 or either of the main rock album charts. In the UK, V gave the band only its third top-five position on the UK Independent Albums Chart, as well as its first UK Rock & Metal Albums Chart number one since Black Country Communion 2.

== Background ==
Plans for a fifth Black Country Communion album were touted as early as July 2018 – less than a year after the release of BCCIV – when drummer Jason Bonham revealed that there were discussions regarding the possibility of the band recording in January 2019. Due to each of the members' respective schedules, however, frontman Glenn Hughes quickly suggested that this timeline was unlikely, predicting that the band would not reconvene for another album until around 2020. The planned recording of a fifth BCC album continued to be delayed, with Hughes suggesting January 2021 in August 2019, and guitarist Joe Bonamassa targeting the end of 2021 in July 2020. By October 2020, Bonamassa was suggesting a timescale of "18 months from now" (around April 2022) for the group to come together again.

There were no further updates regarding a fifth BCC album until September 2022, when Bonamassa stated that he and Hughes were going to start writing material together the following month, with the plan to record during 2023. By June 2023, Hughes was predicting an early 2024 release for the album, which was reported to be "90% done" by that August, with mainly vocals and a few guitar parts left to record. The album was officially announced in January 2024, with a release date of June scheduled. On March 1, the band announced the album's title V and issued "Stay Free" as the first single on streaming platforms. This was followed in April by "Red Sun", and finally in May by the final single "Enlighten". V was released on June 14, 2024, by J&R Adventures, a label co-owned by band member Bonamassa.

== Reception ==
=== Commercial ===
V was BCC's first studio album not to register on the US Billboard 200 or Top Rock Albums chart, as well as the band's first release overall not to register on the Independent Albums or Hard Rock Albums chart. The only Billboard chart on which the album registered was the Top Album Sales ranking, on which it peaked at number 38. In the UK, V debuted at number 58 on the UK Albums Chart, making it the band's first studio release not to reach the top 30. It did, however, give the band its first UK Rock & Metal Albums Chart number one since Black Country Communion 2, as well as becoming only their second album to reach the top ten of the Scottish Albums Chart (peaking at number 7) and their third album to reach the top five of the UK Independent Albums Chart (peaking at number 4). Elsewhere, it reached number 7 in Switzerland, number 11 in Germany, number 13 in the Netherlands, number 15 in Austria, number 74 in the Wallonia region of Belgium, and number 81 in the Flanders region of Belgium.

=== Critical ===
Professional ratings
Review scores
Source	Rating
Classic Rock	3.5/5 stars

Media response to V was generally positive. Reviewing the album for Classic Rock magazine, Neil Jeffries wrote that on the album, "BCC remember what they're good at – and what we like", praising all four members but in particular keyboardist Derek Sherinian, claiming that "Whether soloing, counterpointing a guitar riff or adding background tones, his Hammond organ lifts virtually every track." Other commentators were similarly satisfied – Pete Feenstra of Get Ready to Rock! described the album as "a solid reminder of a great band that remains a definitive conduit between classic rock's past and present"; Andrew Slaidins of The Rockpit suggested that while "the first two BCC albums are untouchable", "this album sits comfortably behind them"; and Alan Cox of Sonic Perspectives called it "both familiar and satisfying".

== Track listing ==
All tracks are written by Glenn Hughes and Joe Bonamassa, except tracks 2 and 5 by Hughes.

V track listing
No.	Title	Length
1.	"Enlighten"	5:20
2.	"Stay Free"	4:30
3.	"Red Sun"	6:32
4.	"Restless"	5:42
5.	"Letting Go"	3:11
6.	"Skyway"	4:27
7.	"You're Not Alone"	4:57
8.	"Love and Faith"	6:32
9.	"Too Far Gone"	3:54
10.	"The Open Road"	5:28
Total length:		50:36

== Personnel ==
Black Country Communion

- Glenn Hughes – bass, lead vocals
- Joe Bonamassa – guitar, vocals (co-lead on track 8)
- Jason Bonham – drums, percussion
- Derek Sherinian – keyboards

Additional personnel

- Dannielle DeAndrea – backing vocals (track 2)
- Jade MacRae – backing vocals (track 2)
- Kevin Shirley – production, engineering, mixing
- Nate Haessly – engineering
- Bob Ludwig – mastering
- Hugh Syme – art direction, illustration, design
- Rob Bondurant – photography

== Charts ==
Chart performance for V
Chart (2024)	Peak position
Austrian Albums (Ö3 Austria Top 40)	15
Belgian Albums (Ultratop Flanders)	81
Belgian Albums (Ultratop Wallonia)	74
Dutch Albums (MegaCharts)	13
German Albums (Offizielle Top 100)	11
Scottish Albums (OCC)	7
Swiss Albums (Schweizer Hitparade)	7
UK Albums (OCC)	58
UK Album Downloads (OCC)	19
UK Albums Sales (OCC)	7
UK Independent Albums (OCC)	4
UK Physical Albums (OCC)	6
UK Record Store (OCC)	40
UK Rock & Metal Albums (OCC)	1
UK Vinyl Albums (OCC)	25
US Top Album Sales (Billboard)	38
