= California Breed (album) =

Studio album by California Breed
- Released: 19 May 2014
- Recorded: 2013–2014
- Studio: Low Country Sound (Nashville, Tennessee)
- Genre: Hard rock
- Length: 51:43
- Label: Frontiers
- Producer: Dave Cobb

Professional ratings
Review scores
| Source | Rating |
|---|---|
| AllMusic | 3.5/5 stars |

California Breed is the only studio album by English–American hard rock band California Breed. Produced by Dave Cobb, the album was released in May 2014 through Frontiers Records.

== Background ==
California Breed was formed in 2013 by Glenn Hughes, Jason Bonham (both having recently been part of Black Country Communion), and Andrew Watt; Hughes and Watt initially began writing together after meeting, with Bonham finalising the trio's lineup shortly after. The group recorded its debut album throughout late 2013, an album which was recorded live-to-tape in the studio, and the formation of the band was formally announced the following year.

== Track listing ==
All tracks are written by Glenn Hughes, Andrew Watt and Jason Bonham.

| No. | Title | Length |
|---|---|---|
| 1. | "The Way" | 3:54 |
| 2. | "Sweet Tea" | 3:52 |
| 3. | "Chemical Rain" | 4:38 |
| 4. | "Midnight Oil" | 4:45 |
| 5. | "All Falls Down" | 5:07 |
| 6. | "The Grey" | 3:55 |
| 7. | "Days They Come" | 4:17 |
| 8. | "Spit You Out" | 3:38 |
| 9. | "Strong" | 4:26 |
| 10. | "Invisible" | 4:44 |
| 11. | "Scars" | 4:10 |
| 12. | "Breathe" | 4:17 |
| Total length: | | 51:43 |

Deluxe edition bonus track
| No. | Title | Length |
|---|---|---|
| 13. | "Solo" | 4:48 |
| Total length: | | 56:31 |

Deluxe edition bonus DVD
| No. | Title | Length |
|---|---|---|
| 1. | "The Way" (music video) | 4:05 |
| 2. | "Sweet Tea" (music video) | 3:54 |
| 3. | "The Making of California Breed" | 23:31 |
| Total length: | | 31:30 |

Japanese edition bonus track
| No. | Title | Length |
|---|---|---|
| 14. | "Breathe" (acoustic) | 4:39 |

== Personnel ==
California Breed

- Glenn Hughes – vocals, bass
- Andrew Watt – guitar, vocals
- Jason Bonham – drums

Additional musicians

- Dave Cobb – production, percussion
- Mike Webb – keyboards
- Kristen Rogers – backing vocals
- Julian Lennon – additional vocals on "Breathe"

Production personnel

- Mark Petaccia – engineering
- Vance Powell – mixing
- Eddie Spear – mixing assistance
- Pete Lyman – mastering
- Tim Ellis – Additional audio engineering on "Breathe"

Graphics personnel

- Austyn Weiner – art direction, photography
- The Charles – graphic design

== Chart positions ==
| Chart | Peak position |
|---|---|
| Dutch Albums Chart | 93 |
| UK Albums Chart | 26 |
| UK Rock Albums Chart | 1 |

== Release history ==
| Region | Date | Label | Format | Ref. |
|---|---|---|---|---|
| Europe | May 19, 2014 | Frontiers Records | CD | |
| Europe | May 19, 2014 | Frontiers Records | CD/DVD | |
| North America | May 20, 2014 | Frontiers Records | CD | |
| North America | May 20, 2014 | Frontiers Records | CD/DVD | |
