= The Disregard of Timekeeping =

Studio album by Bonham
- Released: 6 July 1989
- Recorded: Spring 1989
- Genres: Hard rock; glam metal
- Length: 55:36
- Label: WTG
- Producer: Bob Ezrin

Bonham chronology
The Disregard of Timekeeping (1989)	Mad Hatter (1992)

Singles from The Disregard of Timekeeping
- 1. "Wait for You" Released: 1989; 2. "Guilty" Released: 1990; 3. "Bringing Me Down" Released: 1990

Professional ratings
Review scores
Source	Rating
AllMusic	3.5/5 stars

The Disregard of Timekeeping is the debut studio album by British/Canadian band Bonham, released on 6 July 1989, through WTG. It was produced by Bob Ezrin, who had previously worked with Alice Cooper, Pink Floyd, and Kiss; in addition to his usual production duties, he also co-wrote three of the tracks. The album features Trevor Rabin as a guest, who was the lead guitarist and songwriter with Yes from 1982 to 1994.

"Wait For You" had a music video that was filmed at "Disney-MGM Studios' New York backlot".

== Reception ==
William Ruhlmann of AllMusic stated the record was "palatable, but without the famous name it would be hard to distinguish from the army of other Zep imitators".

== Track listing ==
All tracks are written by Jason Bonham, John Smithson, Ian Hatton & Daniel MacMaster, except where indicated.

No.	Title	Writer(s)	Length
1.	"The Disregard of Timekeeping"	Bonham, Smithson, Hatton, MacMaster, Bob Ezrin	2:08
2.	"Wait for You"	Bonham, Smithson, Hatton, MacMaster, Ezrin	5:08
3.	"Bringing Me Down"		4:19
4.	"Guilty"	Bonham, Smithson, Hatton, MacMaster, Ezrin	4:36
5.	"Holding on Forever"		4:55
6.	"Dreams"		7:50
7.	"Don't Walk Away"		4:43
8.	"Playing to Win"		6:53
9.	"Cross Me and See"		5:26
10.	"Just Another Day"		4:26
11.	"Room for Us All"		7:12
Total length:			55:36

== Personnel ==
- Daniel MacMaster – vocals
- Ian Hatton – guitar
- John Smithson – bass (except 3, 5, 7), keyboards, violin (track 4)
- Jason Bonham – drums

=== Additional personnel ===
- Trevor Rabin – bass (track 3, 5, 7), backing vocals
- Duncan Faure – backing vocals
- Jimmy Zavala – harmonica (track 3)
- Bill Millay – keyboard programming, MIDI
- Bob Ezrin – Orchestration (track 4)

=== Production ===
- Produced by Bob Ezrin
- Engineered by Brian Christian, Bob Ezrin, Stan Katayama
- Assistant engineers: Rick Butz, Craig Johnson, Scott Pontius, Mike Tacci
- Mixing: Stan Katayama
- Mastering: Stephen Marcussen

== Charts ==
=== Album ===
Chart (1989)	Peak position
US Billboard 200	38

=== Singles ===
Year	Title	Chart	Position
1989	"Wait for You"	Mainstream Rock Tracks	9
1989	"Wait for You"	Billboard Hot 100	55
1990	"Guilty"	Mainstream Rock Tracks	29
1990	"Bringing Me Down"	Mainstream Rock Tracks	47
