= BCCIV =

Studio album by Black Country Communion
- Released: 22 September 2017
- Recorded: January–February 2017
- Studio: EastWest Studios (Hollywood, California)
- Genre: Hard rock; blues rock
- Length: 60:31
- Label: Mascot; J&R Adventures
- Producer: Kevin Shirley

Black Country Communion chronology
Afterglow (2012)	BCCIV (2017)	V (2024)

Singles from BCCIV
- 1. "Collide" Released: 2 August 2017

BCCIV is the fourth studio album by English–American hard rock band Black Country Communion. Recorded in early 2017 at EastWest Studios in Hollywood, California, it was produced by Kevin Shirley and released on 22 September 2017 by Mascot Records in Europe and J&R Adventures in North America. The album debuted at number 102 on the US Billboard 200, and was the band's first release to reach the top ten of the UK Albums Chart when it entered at number 7 on the chart.

After the release of their third album Afterglow in 2012, Black Country Communion broke up in 2013 due to tensions between vocalist and bassist Glenn Hughes and guitarist and vocalist Joe Bonamassa. In 2016, it was announced that the band would return with a new album the following year, with the pair writing together again. Contrary to the group's previous releases, neither drummer Jason Bonham, keyboardist Derek Sherinian or producer Shirley contributed to songwriting for BCCIV.

BCCIV received positive reviews from the majority of critics. Many commentators praised the album as a more focused and tighter release than Afterglow, due to the increased collaboration between Hughes and Bonamassa during songwriting and recording, who had worked separately on the 2012 release. The album was preceded by the release of opening track "Collide" as a single and music video on 2 August 2017, and was promoted at the two concerts in the UK in January 2018.

== Writing and recording ==
Black Country Communion's reunion was first announced on 20 April 2016, with the band's bassist and vocalist Glenn Hughes, drummer Jason Bonham and producer Kevin Shirley all revealing on Facebook that they would be working on a new album for release in 2017. The idea was initially proposed by guitarist and vocalist Joe Bonamassa to the other band members; in an interview on Sirius XM in May, Bonham explained that "Joe sent out a message. He just said, 'You know what? I can't believe it's been six years since we did the first album. I feel that we could really give it all and make another amazing album. Anybody interested?' And that was literally it." Hughes recalled in an interview with Danish music magazine Metalized that Bonamassa invited him to dinner in March, where he proposed that the group reunite to record a fourth album. Speaking about the meeting, the band's frontman outlined that "we talked about making this new album and decided to really go for it as well as how now may be the right time to do the reunion", claiming in a later interview that he had "never seen [Bonamassa] so excited about recording an album with BCC before".

Hughes and Bonamassa started writing material for Black Country Communion's fourth album began on 5 September 2016 at the former's house in Los Angeles, California. After "about a week" of writing, the pair reconvened on 25 October for a second week to finish the material. In total, they spent eleven days writing the album. Speaking about the songwriting process, Hughes explained that "All the songs were written with a topic ... This album is about walking through the fear, having faith, [and] hope", detailing that songs were written about topics including "the killing of dolphins" on "The Cove", "the bird that watches over the band" on "The Crow", and "the leader of the orchestra on the Titanic" on "The Last Song for My Resting Place". Recording began on 4 January 2017, and was completed within seven days. The album was recorded at EastWest Studios in Hollywood, California and mixed at Shirley's studio The Cave in Sydney. After recording was finished, Bonamassa described the process as a "very, very special week for me", adding that "I think we have the best album that we've done".

== Promotion and release ==
After originally being set for release on 20 May, BCCIV was officially announced on 31 July 2017 for a scheduled 22 September release. Three days later, "Collide" was released as the first single and music video from the album, following its worldwide premiere on British radio station Planet Rock earlier in the day. In the weeks leading up to the album's release, the band shared a series of three videos documenting its recording process, including interviews with the band members. In promotion of BCCIV, the band are set to play two shows in the UK in January 2018 – the first at Wolverhampton Civic Hall on 2 January and the second at the Hammersmith Apollo in London two days later. Speaking about the lack of extended touring, which was cited as the main reason for the band's breakup in 2013, keyboardist Derek Sherinian explained that "We didn't set any conditions of any kind. We just said: 'If we're gonna do a record, let's do it.' There was no mandate for touring." Similarly, Hughes stated shortly after the reunion that "all that happened was that Joe and I wanted different things", suggesting that "I have no idea whether there will be a tour from BCC. There may well be a chance of that but at this point I'm not going to speculate". A music video for "The Last Song for My Resting Place" was released on 25 October 2017.

== Reception ==
=== Commercial ===
BCCIV debuted at number 102 on the US Billboard 200, number 14 on the Top Rock Albums chart, number 4 on the Hard Rock Albums chart, number 6 on the Independent Albums and Tastemaker Albums charts, and number 24 on the Top Album Sales chart. The album was Black Country Communion's first to reach the top ten of the UK Albums Chart, debuting at number 7. The album also entered the Scottish Albums Chart at number 5, the UK Rock & Metal Albums Chart at number 3, and the UK Independent Albums Chart at number 2. Outside of the UK, it reached number 6 in Germany, number 29 in the Netherlands, number 32 in Sweden, number 33 in Norway, number 48 in the Flanders region of Belgium, and number 57 in the Wallonia region of Belgium.

=== Critical ===
Professional ratings
Review scores
Source	Rating
AllMusic	3.5/5 stars
Classic Rock	4/5 stars
Express & Star	9/10
Guitarist	8/10
Mojo	4/5 stars
National Rock Review	Favorable
Total Guitar	4/5 stars

Media response to BCCIV was generally positive, with many critics focusing their praise on the more focused, collaborative approach to the production of the album compared to that of Afterglow, during which tensions arose between Hughes and Bonamassa. Stephen Thomas Erlewine of AllMusic described it as "a sharper full-length album than Afterglow", suggesting that the group's break served to "help focus the band". Guitarist magazine noted that "the instinctive results cooked up in [the band's] usual tight window of recording time find them focused on songcraft rather than any extended ego flexing", adding that it "feels more focused than its predecessor". Mark Blake of Mojo magazine claimed that "Rather than a summit meeting between gifted but otherwise disconnected musicians, BCCIV sounds like it was created by a real band".

Reviewing the album for Classic Rock magazine, David Stubbs claimed that "BCCIV thrives on the contrasting creativity of the seasoned, soulful ... Hughes and the pyrotechnic, Pageian riffery of co-songwriter Bonamassa". Erlewine outlined that "the group has palpable chemistry and ... they're instrumentally in fine fettle here", while Express & Star writer Leigh Sanders called the album "simply brilliant" and claimed that "There is no filler here. Each track is engaging and masterful as these super musicians combine to show how rock should be done." National Rock Review's Adam Kennedy agreed that "you don't find yourself skipping tracks, there are no fillers, from start to finish you hear a band at the top of their game". Blake compared BCC IV favourably to the band's back catalogue, suggesting that it featured "their best music yet".

== Track listing ==
All lyrics are written by Glenn Hughes, except where noted; all music is composed by Joe Bonamassa and Hughes.

No.	Title	Length
1.	"Collide"	4:06
2.	"Over My Head"	4:06
3.	"The Last Song for My Resting Place" (lyrics written by Bonamassa)	7:57
4.	"Sway"	5:24
5.	"The Cove"	7:11
6.	"The Crow"	6:00
7.	"Wanderlust"	8:17
8.	"Love Remains"	4:53
9.	"Awake"	4:42
10.	"When the Morning Comes"	7:55
Total length:		60:31

Vinyl edition bonus track
No.	Title	Length
11.	"With You I Go"	5:04
Total length:		65:35

== Personnel ==
- Glenn Hughes – vocals, bass
- Joe Bonamassa – guitar, mandolin, vocals (lead on track 3)
- Jason Bonham – drums, percussion
- Derek Sherinian – keyboards
- Kevin Shirley – production, mixing, additional percussion
- Gerry O'Connor – fiddle (track 3)
- Jared Kvitka – engineering
- Bo Bodnar – engineering assistance
- Cramer Helton – engineering assistance
- Bob Ludwig – mastering
- Dennis Friel Art Studios – cover artwork, design, illustrations
- Dale Voelker – package design
- Neil Zlozower – portrait photography
- Annie Lesser – studio photography

== Charts ==
Chart (2017)	Peak position
Austrian Albums (Ö3 Austria)	12
Belgian Albums (Ultratop Flanders)	48
Belgian Albums (Ultratop Wallonia)	57
Czech Albums (ČNS IFPI)	17
Dutch Albums (Album Top 100)	29
Finnish Albums (Suomen virallinen lista)	42
French Albums (SNEP)	83
German Albums (Offizielle Top 100)	6
Norwegian Albums (VG-lista)	33
Polish Albums (ZPAV)	20
Scottish Albums (OCC)	5
Swedish Albums (Sverigetopplistan)	32
Swiss Albums (Schweizer Hitparade)	5
UK Albums (OCC)	7
UK Independent Albums (OCC)	2
UK Rock & Metal Albums (OCC)	3
US Billboard 200	102
US Independent Albums (Billboard)	6
US Top Hard Rock Albums (Billboard)	4
US Top Rock Albums (Billboard)	14
