= Live Over Europe (Black Country Communion album) =

Video by Black Country Communion
- Released: October 24, 2011 (DVD); November 15, 2011 (BD)
- Recorded: July 4, 5 and 16, 2011
- Venue: Zenith (Munich); Spandau Citadel (Berlin); Stadtpark (Hamburg)
- Genre: Hard rock, blues rock
- Length: 108:35
- Label: J&R Adventures, Mascot
- Producer: Kevin Shirley

Live Over Europe

Live album by Black Country Communion
- Released: February 28, 2012
- Recorded: July 4, 5 and 16, 2011
- Venue: Zenith (Munich); Spandau Citadel (Berlin); Stadtpark (Hamburg)
- Length: 101:58
- Label: J&R Adventures, Mascot
- Producer: Kevin Shirley

Black Country Communion chronology
Black Country Communion 2 (2011)	Live Over Europe (2012)	Afterglow (2012)

Live Over Europe is the first video album by English-American hard rock band Black Country Communion. Released on October 24, 2011, the album documents the supergroup's debut tour of Europe in the summer of 2011. Produced by Kevin Shirley, who also produced the band's two studio albums, the video's track listing is made up of six tracks from Black Country and nine tracks from 2, and includes a new instrumental track in the video's introduction, a Joe Bonamassa solo song and a song from Glenn Hughes' time with Deep Purple. Live Over Europe was released as a live album on February 28, 2012.

== Background and release ==
Footage for Live Over Europe was recorded during three shows in the German cities of Hamburg, Munich and Berlin with 14 high-definition cameras. The album was released on DVD on October 24, 2011, followed by the Blu-ray version on November 15. In addition to the 18-song live setlist, bonus features include a 28-page booklet, a 20-minute 'behind the scenes' featurette and a photo collection. From September 8, 2011 fans were able to access a free digital download of "Song of Yesterday" from the album, which was also made available on the band's Facebook event page for the release of the album. Live Over Europe was premiered in the United States on the Palladia network on October 22, 2011. The live video was also shown at a number of Vue Cinemas in the United Kingdom on November 1, which included "an exclusive filmed introduction from all four members of [the band]".

Speaking about the tour in general, producer Kevin Shirley said the following:

We saw that this live act could be an awesome force of nature to behold; one that promised legendary performances like those of our heroes of classic rock. The plan was to get them out there for the entire world to hear. Records allow a certain musical finesse, but live performance promises so much in the very transient nature of a gig; chances are taken, boundaries are crossed and the most exciting performances explode. Two studio albums built a repertoire big enough for a full concert which allowed us to unleash the monster for the rest of the world to see and feel.

== Reception ==
Professional ratings
Review scores
Source	Rating
AllMusic	3.5/5 stars
Geeks of Doom	favourable
Jukebox:Metal	3/5 stars

Reviews of Live Over Europe have been generally average. Christian Genzel for AllMusic gave the album 3.5 out of five stars. Jukebox:Metal critic Andy Lye was slightly more critical, claiming that "it should have been so much more" and noting that the presence of video interviews in between songs was unnecessary and interfering with the overall feel of the concert footage. A review on Geeks of Doom was more favourable, though, praising the quality of the material in its own right and pointing out the showmanship of frontman Glenn Hughes.

== Track listing ==
Video album
No.	Title	Writer(s)	Length
1.	"Revolution of the Machine" (intro)	Kevin Shirley, Jeff Bova	1:45
2.	"Black Country"	Glenn Hughes, Joe Bonamassa	3:51
3.	"One Last Soul"	Hughes, Bonamassa	4:01
4.	"Crossfire"	Hughes	6:32
5.	"Save Me"	Hughes, Jason Bonham, Bonamassa, Derek Sherinian, Shirley, Chris Blackwell	8:08
6.	"The Battle for Hadrian's Wall"	Bonamassa, Hughes, Shirley	4:51
7.	"Beggarman"	Hughes	5:12
8.	"Faithless"	Hughes, Bonamassa, Shirley	5:20
9.	"Song of Yesterday"	Bonamassa, Shirley, Hughes	9:10
10.	"I Can See Your Spirit"	Hughes, Bonamassa, Shirley	5:06
11.	"Cold"	Hughes, Bonamassa, Shirley	7:56
12.	"The Ballad of John Henry" (originally performed by Joe Bonamassa)	Bonamassa, Mississippi John Hurt	10:45
13.	"The Outsider"	Hughes, Bonamassa, Shirley, Sherinian	5:21
14.	"The Great Divide"	Hughes, Bonamassa	4:47
15.	"Sista Jane" (includes outro to The Who's "Won't Get Fooled Again")	Hughes, Bonamassa, Pete Townshend	7:53
16.	"Man in the Middle"	Hughes, Bonamassa, Shirley	4:50
17.	"Burn" (originally performed by Deep Purple)	Ritchie Blackmore, David Coverdale, Jon Lord, Ian Paice	7:57
18.	"Smokestack Woman" (credits)	Hughes	5:10
Total length:			108:35

Live album, disc one
No.	Title	Writer(s)	Length
1.	"Revolution of the Machine" (intro)	Shirley, Bova	1:45
2.	"Black Country"	Hughes, Bonamassa	3:45
3.	"One Last Soul"	Hughes, Bonamassa	3:59
4.	"Crossfire"	Hughes	6:31
5.	"Save Me"	Hughes, Bonham, Bonamassa, Sherinian, Shirley, Blackwell	7:52
6.	"The Battle for Hadrian's Wall"	Bonamassa, Hughes, Shirley	4:42
7.	"Beggarman"	Hughes	4:59
8.	"Faithless"	Hughes, Bonamassa, Shirley	5:14
9.	"Song of Yesterday"	Bonamassa, Shirley, Hughes	9:11
10.	"I Can See Your Spirit"	Hughes, Bonamassa, Shirley	5:12
Total length:			53:10

Live album, disc two
No.	Title	Writer(s)	Length
1.	"Cold"	Hughes, Bonamassa, Shirley	7:54
2.	"The Ballad of John Henry" (originally performed by Joe Bonamassa)	Bonamassa, Hurt	10:43
3.	"The Outsider"	Hughes, Bonamassa, Shirley, Sherinian	4:49
4.	"The Great Divide"	Hughes, Bonamassa	4:41
5.	"Sista Jane" (includes outro to The Who's "Won't Get Fooled Again")	Hughes, Bonamassa	7:44
6.	"Man in the Middle"	Hughes, Bonamassa, Shirley	4:49
7.	"Burn" (originally performed by Deep Purple)	Blackmore, Coverdale, Hughes, Lord, Paice	7:59
Total length:			48:48

- The CD track listing incorrectly lists "I Can See Your Spirit" as being the first track on disc two.

== Personnel ==
Black Country Communion

- Glenn Hughes – bass, vocals
- Joe Bonamassa – guitar, vocals, theremin
- Jason Bonham – drums, backing vocals
- Derek Sherinian – keyboards, synthesizers, organ

Production personnel

- Kevin Shirley – production, mixing, liner notes
- Warren Cracknell – engineering
- Jared Kvitka – engineering
- Josh De Jong – Pro Tools engineering

Additional personnel

- Roy Weisman – executive production
- Philippe Klose – video direction
- Marcus Bird – photography and direction
- Dennis Friel – graphic design
- Christie Goodwin – photography

== Chart positions ==
Video album

Chart (2011)	Peak
German Video Charts	28
Norwegian Video Chart	5

Live album

Chart (2012)	Peak
US Billboard Hard Rock Albums	23
US Billboard Independent Albums	44
Belgian Albums Chart	100
UK Rock Albums Chart	2
