= Mad Hatter (album) =

- Original album artwork by Mark Ryden

Studio album by Bonham
- Released: July 2, 1992 (JPN)
- Genre: Hard rock, heavy metal, glam metal
- Length: 57:42
- Label: WTG
- Producer: Tony Platt, Ron Saint Germain, Bonham

Bonham chronology
The Disregard of Timekeeping (1989)	Mad Hatter (1992)

Singles from Mad Hatter
- 1. "Change of a Season" Released: 1992

Professional ratings
Review scores
Source	Rating
AllMusic	3/5 stars
Entertainment Weekly	C

Mad Hatter is the second and final studio album from the British/Canadian hard rock band Bonham, released in 1992. This was the band’s last record under the moniker Bonham, however it wasn’t the last overall as the group changed its name twice in the upcoming years and released two more studio albums under two different band names.

The album was named after a small bar near San Antonio in Ibiza that the band used to frequent while recording in a nearby disused nightclub called Heartbreak Hotel.

== Track listing ==
1. "Bing" – 4:48
2. "Mad Hatter" – 5:20
3. "Change of a Season" – 6:58
4. "Hold On" – 4:20
5. "The Storm" – 5:56
6. "Ride on a Dream" – 5:47
7. "Good with the Bad" – 6:36
8. "Backdoor" – 3:34
9. "Secrets" – 4:36
10. "Los Locos" – 3:53
11. "Chimera" – 5:54

== Charts ==
=== Singles ===
Year	Single	Chart	Position
1992	"Change of a Season"	US Mainstream Rock Tracks	32

== Credits ==
- Daniel MacMaster – lead vocals
- Ian Hatton – guitars
- John Smithson – bass, backing vocals, keyboards, violin
- Jason Bonham – drums, percussion
