= Virginia Wolf =

British rock band

Virginia Wolf were an English rock band from Manchester, England. Their two albums were Virginia Wolf (1986) and Push (1987). The band existed from 1977 until 1988 and featured Nick Bold on lead guitar, Chris Ousey on vocals, Jason Bonham (son of John Bonham) on drums, Jo Burt on bass, and David John Hinson on keyboards. They released five singles, "It's In Your Eyes," "Waiting For Your Love," "One Night," and "Don't Break Away," all released on Atlantic Records, as well as "Let It Out" on Warner Sisters Publishing.

The band were formed in Worsley, England, near Manchester. Their first album was produced by Roger Taylor of Queen in 1986. To promote the album, the band toured the United States with The Firm. 1987 saw the band return to the U.S. to record their second album, "Push", which was recorded at Fantasy Studios in Berkeley, California and produced by Kevin Elson of Journey, and assisted by Wally Buck. After returning to the UK, the band played three farewell shows in each of their respective cities, after which they disbanded. Both Chris Ousey and David John Hinson would later go on to form Heartland. Jo Burt played with many well-established artists. Jason Bonham went on to join Jimmy Page, and Nick Bold went on to establish a successful solo career.

== Personnel ==
=== Principal members ===
- Nick Bold – guitar
- Chris Ousey – vocals
- Jo Burt – Bass
- Jason Bonham – drums
- David John Hinson – keyboards, vocals

=== Early members ===
- Dave Irving – drums
- Paul Johnson – drums
- Steve Brown – vocals
- Clive Corner – bass
- Jeff Waters – bass
- Pete (Earl Wakey) Wakefield – vocals
- Martin Gillbanks (Gilbanks) – drums
- Haydn Jones – guitar

== Discography ==
=== Studio albums ===
- Virginia Wolf (1986)
- Push (1987)

=== Studio Singles ===
- "It's In Your Eyes" (1986)
- "Waiting For You" (1986)
- "One Night" (1987)
- "Don't Break Away" (1987)
- "Let It Out" (?)
