= California Breed =

British-American rock band

- Origin: Los Angeles, California, U.S.
- Genres: Hard rock
- Years active: 2013–2015; 2026–present
- Label: Frontiers
- Members: Jack Blades; Damon Johnson; Joey Castillo
- Past members: Glenn Hughes; Andrew Watt; Jason Bonham

California Breed is an American hard rock supergroup band based in Los Angeles, California. Formed in 2013, the band was a supergroup composed of bassist and vocalist Glenn Hughes, guitarist Andrew Watt, and drummer Jason Bonham. Following the breakup of his previous band Black Country Communion, Hughes was introduced to Watt in 2013 and the two quickly formed California Breed, with Black Country Communion drummer Bonham completing the lineup shortly after. The band recorded its self-titled debut album with producer Dave Cobb in late 2013, which was released through Frontiers Records in May 2014 and reached number 78 on the US Billboard 200.

Following the release of the album, Bonham left California Breed due to other commitments preventing him from touring; he was replaced by former Queens of the Stone Age and Eagles of Death Metal drummer Joey Castillo. The band toured in support of the band Alter Bridge, and later on five UK dates with Slash featuring Myles Kennedy and the Conspirators. It was later revealed that Bonham's departure was likely to be permanent, and in January 2015 the band announced that it would no longer continue.

== History ==
=== 2013–2014: Formation and debut album ===
Hughes was first introduced to Watt by friend and fellow musician Julian Lennon on February 9, 2013 in Los Angeles, California. After the guitarist emailed Hughes some of his music, Hughes recalls that he "heard a good writer, a good guitar player, and a good singer, three things that are important", at which point he decided to enlist him in his new band.

A few days after meeting, Hughes and Watt quickly wrote two songs together – "Chemical Rain" and "Solo" – both of which were later included on the band's debut album. Speaking about this meeting, Hughes recalls that he "was so moved by the music, I said, 'We've got to record this!'", at which point he called Bonham to finalise the group's lineup. Citing bands such as Rush and Cream, the two decided against adding a keyboardist to their band, and instead progress as a power trio.

Throughout the rest of 2013, the three-piece recorded 12 songs for its debut album, all of which were credited equally among all three members. On February 6, 2014, the announcement of the formation of California Breed was made, as well as the news of first single "Midnight Oil". In March, it was announced that the band would release its debut album, California Breed, in May. Upon release, the album reached number 78 on the Billboard 200, number 22 on Top Rock Albums, and topped the Top Hard Rock Albums chart. Outside of the US, it reached number 26 on the UK Albums Chart, topped the UK Rock Albums Chart, and charted in a number of European territories.

The band's debut live performance took place on May 28 at the Whisky a Go Go in West Hollywood, California. The setlist included all 13 songs from the album, plus cover versions of Led Zeppelin's "What Is and What Should Never Be" and "Immigrant Song", and songs by Hughes's previous bands Trapeze ("Medusa") and Deep Purple ("Burn").

=== 2014–2015: Lineup change and breakup ===
In August 2014, it was announced that Bonham had left the group prior to the band's upcoming UK tour, with the announcement citing "professional commitments" as the reason preventing his continued involvement. He was replaced by Joey Castillo, and Bonham later added to the news by stating that, "I love those guys – but it wasn't going to work out for me. I will support them as I love the band I helped create, and Joey is great." Hughes later confirmed that Bonham's departure was permanent, explaining that, "his other commitments were getting in the way of his California Breed schedule. I have no disrespect for Jason, only tonnes of love. It's just that he chose to work with other people when in fact he should be working with California Breed."

On January 15, 2015, it was announced that California Breed had split up, with the band announcing on its Twitter page that "We are no more… another thing we couldn't keep together." Watt later added his own thoughts on the announcement, adding "I put everything I had into this band. All I can say is I was in it for the long haul. This is not the end – it is truly the beginning." A few days later, Hughes elaborated on the breakup, stating that it was not right to continue the band without the original lineup of himself, Watt and Bonham.

== Style, songwriting, and influences ==
Talking about the group's style upon the announcement of its formation, Hughes summarised California Breed as "proper rock", describing the band as a mixture between traditional and modern elements of the genre. Watt identifies The Who, The Rolling Stones, and Led Zeppelin as influences on his style, while Bonham has compared the guitarist to Jimi Hendrix. The band's debut album was written equally by its three members, and has been described as a mix between "the classic rock elements of Black Country Communion – big, meat-cleaver riffs and heart-rending vocals – but with a 21st-century gloss".

== Band members ==
=== Current line-up ===
- Jack Blades – lead vocals, bass (2026–present)
- Damon Johnson – guitar (2026–present)
- Joey Castillo – drums (2014–2015, touring, 2026–present)

=== Former ===
- Glenn Hughes – lead vocals, bass (2013–2015)
- Andrew Watt – guitar, backing vocals (2013–2015)
- Jason Bonham – drums, backing vocals (2013–2014)

== Discography ==
Title	Album details	Peak chart positions									
Title	Album details	US	US Hard	US Rock	AUT	BEL Wal.	GER	NED	SWI	UK	UK Rock
California Breed	Released: May 19, 2014; Label: Frontiers; Formats: CD, CD+DVD, download	78	1	22	51	196	40	93	40	26	1
