= National Rock Review =

National Rock Review (NRR)
- Website type: Rock music news and reviews
- Owner: NRR Media
- Creator: Mick McDonald
- Website: http://www.nationalrockreview.com/
- Registration: Optional
- Launched: September 2013
- Current status: Active

National Rock Review (NRR) is an American website dedicated to rock music news, as well as interviews, concert photography, album and music DVD reviews.

== History ==
The website was founded in September 2013 by Mick McDonald, owner of NRR Media LLC, a music entertainment publishing company dedicated to covering local and national artists in North America and Europe.

National Rock Review is formed by a network of concert reviewers, music photographers and music release reviewers collaborating with the music industry to provide a global coverage of musical events and releases.

Dave Ball is the current managing editor and director of the National Rock Review.
