= Daniel MacMaster =

Canadian singer

- Born: Daniel Stewert MacMaster; July 16, 1968; Barrie, Ontario, Canada
- Died: March 16, 2008 (aged 39) Thunder Bay, Ontario, Canada
- Genres: Hard rock, glam metal
- Occupation: Musician
- Instruments: Vocals, keyboards, harmonica, tambourine
- Years active: 1988–2008
- Formerly of: Bonham; Scorcher; Emerald Monkey; Monkey Macmaster

Daniel Stewart MacMaster (July 11, 1968 – March 16, 2008) was a Canadian singer, who was lead vocalist for the Canadian/British hard rock band Bonham.

== Career ==
With Bonham, he released two albums: 1989's The Disregard of Timekeeping (which peaked at Number 38 on the Billboard charts) and 1992's Mad Hatter. In 2001, Daniel was looking to put a new project together, starting with guitarist Stefano Fantin, and a string of small club dates were performed in the Barrie area, though, due to musical differences, they parted ways. In 2005, Daniel released a solo album entitled Rock Bonham...And The Long Road Back which was re-issued by Suncity Records in 2006. Later, MacMaster started a new project with Connecticut-based singer-songwriter Jimmy D of the band Emerald Monkey, dubbed Monkey-MacMaster. The group was planning on releasing music and playing shows; in addition MacMaster had been working on his own material. However, neither of these projects were completed due to MacMaster's death.

== Death ==
MacMaster died from a Group A streptococcal infection, which he thought was a cold, after developing sepsis, at Thunder Bay Regional Health Sciences Centre, on March 16, 2008. He was married and had two children.

== Discography ==
=== Studio albums ===
- Rock Bonham... And the Long Road Back (2005)

=== with Bonham ===
- The Disregard of Timekeeping (1989)
- Mad Hatter (1992)

=== with Scorcher ===
- No Thanks (1994)

=== Guest appearances ===
- Emerald Monkey – Heroes of the Night – A Tribute to KISS (2008)
