= Jason Bonham =

English drummer (born 1966)

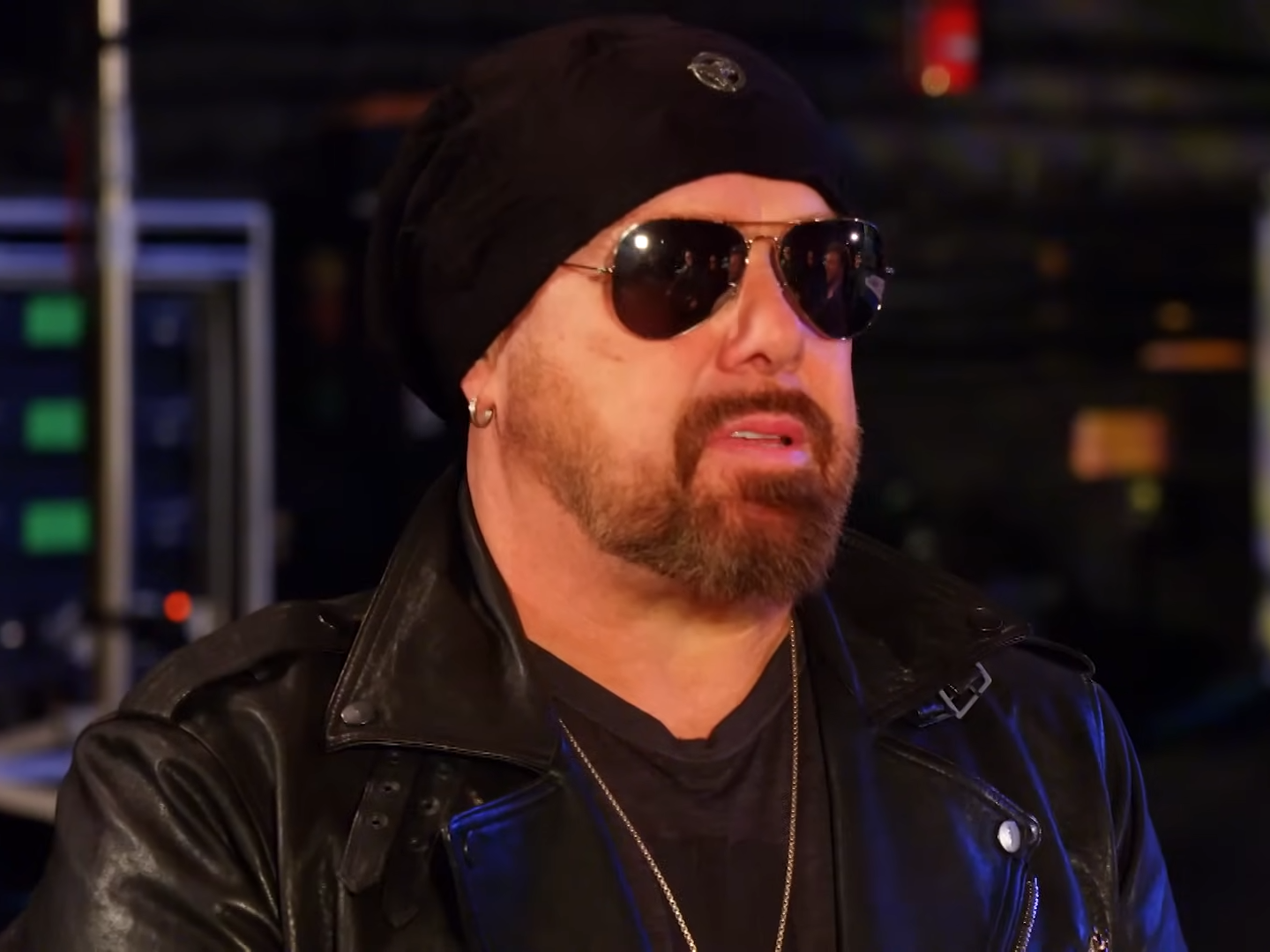
- Bonham in 2021

Background information
- Born: 15 July 1966 (age 60); Dudley, England
- Origin: Liverpool, England
- Genres: Hard rock; blues rock; heavy metal
- Occupations: Musician; songwriter
- Instruments: Drums; vocals
- Years active: 1980–present
- Member of: Black Country Communion; Jason Bonham's Led Zeppelin Evening
- Formerly of: Bonham; Foreigner; Steel Dragon; Damnocracy; Airrace; Virginia Wolf; Healing Sixes; UFO; California Breed; Led Zeppelin; Sammy Hagar and the Circle
- Website: jasonbonham.net

Jason John Bonham (born 15 July 1966) is an English drummer. He is the son of Led Zeppelin drummer John Bonham. Since his father's death in September 1980, he has performed with the surviving three members of Led Zeppelin on several occasions, including the Ahmet Ertegun Tribute Concert at The O2 Arena in London in December 2007. He has also done extensive work as a session musician, led the group Bonham in the 1980s and '90s, and is a member of the supergroup Black Country Communion.

== Biography and musical career ==
=== Early years ===
Bonham could play drums skillfully at the age of five, and appeared with his father in the film The Song Remains the Same, drumming on a scaled-down kit. At 15, he joined his first band, Airrace. In 1985, he joined Virginia Wolf, making two albums and touring the US supporting the Firm.

In 1988, Bonham joined Led Zeppelin guitarist Jimmy Page for his Outrider album and tour. In May of the same year, Bonham appeared with the three surviving members of Led Zeppelin for a performance at Atlantic Records 40th Anniversary concert in New York City.

In 1989, Bonham appeared as a special guest at the Moscow Music Peace Festival, performing the song "Rock and Roll" with many major rock stars of the day. That same year, he formed his own band, Bonham, whose Zeppelin-inspired first release The Disregard of Timekeeping had a hit single, "Wait for You" and the music video for the subsequent single "Guilty" did get some play; however, after a lukewarm reception for their 1992 release, Mad Hatter, the band was dissolved, and Bonham concentrated on session work and guest appearances.

On 28 April 1990, Bonham married Jan Charteris in Stone, Worcestershire. His wedding reception included a jam with Jimmy Page, Robert Plant, and John Paul Jones. The Bonhams have two children: a son, Jager, and a daughter, Jaz (born 1993).

Bonham drummed for Paul Rodgers on the Grammy nominated Muddy Water Blues: A Tribute to Muddy Waters project. A year later, with Slash and Paul Rodgers, he appeared at Woodstock II in 1994. Bonham reformed his band with a new lead vocalist, Marti Frederiksen, replacing Daniel MacMaster. Renamed Motherland, they released the album Peace 4 Me later in 1994; however, his down-to-earth nature always showed—on one occasion making an encore drumming appearance for local Led Zeppelin tribute bands Fred Zeppelin and Led Zepagain.

In 1995, Bonham and his sister Zoe represented their father when Led Zeppelin was inducted into the Rock and Roll Hall of Fame.

Bonham soon put together another solo project that culminated in In the Name of My Father - The Zepset, which featured Led Zeppelin songs. Proceeds from the album went to charity. The album followed up with When You See the Sun.

Following an album and tour with his aunt Debbie Bonham, Jason Bonham was invited to drum for hard rock group UFO. In 2006, he recorded with Joe Bonamassa.

Jason Bonham also appeared in the 2001 movie Rock Star. Bonham played drummer A.C., of the fictional band Steel Dragon. The film also featured performances by musicians such as Zakk Wylde, Jeff Pilson, Myles Kennedy, Jeff Scott Soto, Brian Vander Ark, Blas Elias, Nick Catanese, and Ralph Michael Saenz of Steel Panther. He also played on the film's soundtrack.

Bonham starred with Ted Nugent, Evan Seinfeld (Biohazard), Sebastian Bach (Skid Row), and Scott Ian (Anthrax) on the VH1 reality television show, Supergroup, in May 2006. The musicians formed a band called Damnocracy (after ditching the names FIST, God War, and Savage Animal) for the show, during which they lived in a mansion in Las Vegas for twelve days and created music. Jason also played drums live with Foreigner from 2004 to 2007 and part of 2007 to 2008.

Bonham joined the supergroup Black Country Communion with guitarist and vocalist Joe Bonamassa, vocalist and bassist Glenn Hughes and keyboardist Derek Sherinian, late in 2009 and stayed with them until they broke up in March 2013. He rejoined the group when they reformed in 2016.

=== Participation in Led Zeppelin reunions ===
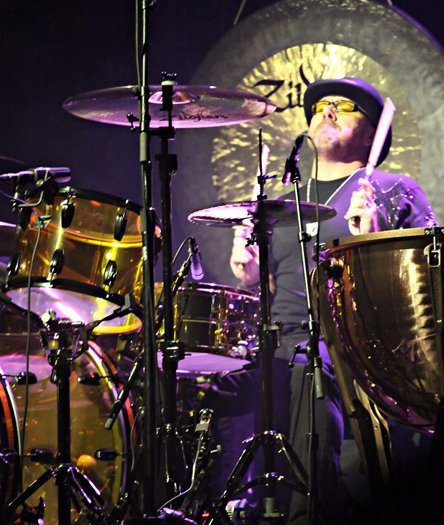
Jason Bonham performing live in 2010

On 14 May 1988, the Atlantic Records label held its 40th Anniversary Celebration by staging a non-stop concert lasting almost 13 hours. A reformed Led Zeppelin, with Jason on drums, closed the event.

On Saturday 28 April 1990, Jason Bonham married Jan Charteris. Later, during the wedding reception at the Heath Hotel in Bewdley, England, Jimmy Page, Robert Plant, and John Paul Jones joined Jason on stage and performed "Custard Pie", "It'll Be Me", "Rock and Roll", "Sick Again", and "Bring It On Home" for the wedding party.

On 12 September 2007, it was announced that Jason Bonham would take over his father's role and play drums for Led Zeppelin at the Led Zeppelin reunion concert. This took place on 10 December 2007 at London's O_{2} arena as part of an all-star tribute to Ahmet Ertegun. His performance was described as "flawless" by music critics.

=== Jason Bonham's Led Zeppelin Evening and other experiences ===
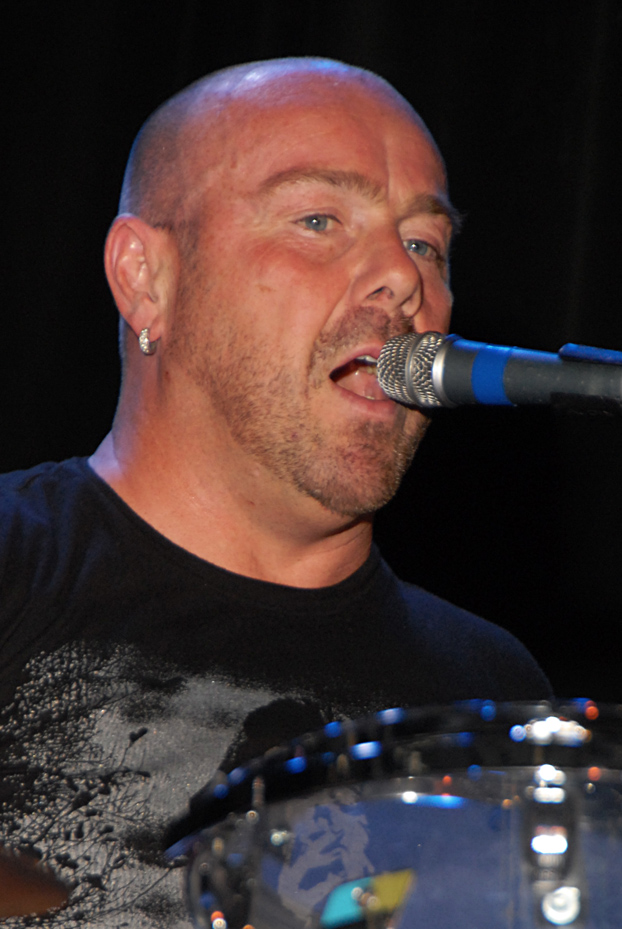
Jason Bonham performing at The Roxy, West Hollywood, California on 11 October 2009

In February 2009, Jason Bonham and James Dylan began working together in what would become Jason Bonham's Led Zeppelin Evening, a live homage to his late father's band. During the autumn of 2010, Jason Bonham's Led Zeppelin Evening embarked on their first North American tour and toured worldwide throughout 2011.

Bonham more recently played drums, along with sisters Ann and Nancy Wilson of the group Heart on vocals and guitar respectively, with successive additions of band, string and horn sections, and choirs (including the Joyce Garrett Youth Choir) for a show-ending performance of "Stairway to Heaven" during the Led Zeppelin tribute at the Kennedy Center Honors hosted by Barack Obama in December 2012 with his late father's band members Robert Plant, Jimmy Page, and John Paul Jones in attendance. It was described as a "bring down the house" version.

In the Summer of 2013, Jason Bonham's Led Zeppelin Evening joined forces with the band Heart for "The Heartbreaker Tour" celebrating the music of Led Zeppelin.

Later that year, he teamed up again with Glenn Hughes to form a new rock band, which became California Breed, adding the guitarist Andrew Watt.

In 2014, Bonham joined Sammy Hagar's supergroup Sammy Hagar and the Circle. The band featured Led Zeppelin tracks along with songs from Hagar's various career projects, such as Montrose, Van Halen, and Chickenfoot.

From early March to late May 2015, Jason Bonham's Led Zeppelin Evening toured extensively in North America. On 4 December 2015, the band began their North American Winter Tour in San Jose, California. In early May 2016, they embarked on a one-month / 22-date North American tour. Most recently, they embarked on another tour throughout the United States, with dates running through November 2021. He also joined Kid Rock on his Bad Reputation Tour.

== Equipment ==
=== Drums ===
Bonham has endorsed DW Drums. Prior to this, for many years he played a Ludwig Vistalite drumkit similar to his late father's.

Drum	Depth	Diameter
Bass	16"	28"
Snare	6.5"	14"
Rack Tom	10"	14"
Floor Tom 1	16"	16"
Floor Tom 2	16"	18"

=== Cymbals ===
Endorses Paiste cymbals

Cymbal	Model	Diameter
Crash	2002	22"
Ride	2002	24"
Thin Crash	Formula 602	22"
Hi-Hats	2002 Sound-Edge	15"
Gong		38"
Crash	2002	20"

=== Drumsticks ===
Bonham has produced his own line of signature series drumstick with Pro-Mark. The SD531W is made of American Maple with acorn shaped, wooden tips. The taper is relatively short and the sticks have considerably large dimensions, being 16.75 in (42.5 cm) in length and 0.595 in (1.51 cm) in diameter. The sticks also feature the symbol used by Bonham's father, John Bonham, of the three interlocking rings – they are printed next to Jason's signature on the side of the stick.

=== Other ===
Bonham endorses Remo drum heads and DW drums & hardware. He uses DW 9000 Series Double Pedals.

== Discography ==
- Shaft of Light by Airrace (1984)
- Virginia Wolf by Virginia Wolf (1986)
- Push by Virginia Wolf (1987)
- Outrider by Jimmy Page (1988)
- The Disregard of Timekeeping by Bonham (1989)
- Mad Hatter by Bonham (1992)
- Muddy Water Blues: A Tribute to Muddy Waters by Paul Rodgers (1993)
- Peace for Me by Motherland (1994)
- In the Name of My Father: The Zepset by Jason Bonham Band (1997)
- When You See the Sun by The Jason Bonham Band (1997)
- Born Again Savage by Little Steven (1999)
- Rock Star: Music from the Motion Picture as Steel Dragon (2001)
- Enormosound by Healing Sixes (2002)
- 100% Live by The Quireboys (2002)
- You Are Here by U.F.O. (2004)
- Extended Versions by Foreigner (2005)
- You & Me by Joe Bonamassa (2006)
- No End in Sight: The Very Best of Foreigner by Foreigner (2008)
- Can't Slow Down by Foreigner (2009)
- Live In London by The Quireboys (2009)
- Black Country Communion by Black Country Communion (2010)
- Black Country Communion 2 by Black Country Communion (2011)
- Celebration Day by Led Zeppelin (2012)
- Afterglow by Black Country Communion (2012)
- California Breed by California Breed (2014)
- At Your Service. by Sammy Hagar and the Circle (2015)
- BCCIV by Black Country Communion (2017)
- Space Between by Sammy Hagar and the Circle (2019)
- Crazy Times by Sammy Hagar and the Circle (2022)
