= Black Country Communion (album) =

Studio album by Black Country Communion
- Released: September 20, 2010
- Recorded: January – April 2010
- Studio: Shangri-La (Malibu, California); The Cave Studios (Malibu, California); Germano Studios (New York City, New York)
- Genre: Hard rock; blues rock
- Length: 72:30
- Label: Mascot; J&R Adventures
- Producer: Kevin Shirley

Black Country Communion chronology
Black Country Communion (2010)	Black Country Communion 2 (2011)

Black Country Communion is the debut studio album by English–American hard rock band Black Country Communion. Recorded between January and April 2010, primarily at Shangri-La in Malibu, California, it was produced by Kevin Shirley and released in Europe by Mascot Records on September 20, 2010, and in North America by J&R Adventures the following day. The album reached number 13 on the UK Albums Chart and number 54 on the US Billboard 200.

Bassist Glenn Hughes and guitarist Joe Bonamassa formed Black Country Communion in November 2009, with Shirley suggesting the addition of drummer Jason Bonham and keyboardist Derek Sherinian. Much of the material for the band's debut album was written by Hughes and Bonamassa, who shared lead vocal duties on several songs. After recording of the base tracks, overdubs were tracked at Shirley's studio The Cave, as well as Germano Studios in New York City.

Black Country Communion received positive reviews from the majority of critics, who praised its effective revival of the 1970s classic rock sound of bands such as Deep Purple and Led Zeppelin, as well as the performances of the supergroup's individual members. The album topped the UK Rock & Metal Albums Chart, as well as reaching the top 20 of the Billboard Top Rock Albums and Hard Rock Albums charts. One music video was released, for the track "The Great Divide".

== Writing and recording ==
After forming Black Country Communion (BCC) in November 2009, bassist Glenn Hughes and guitarist Joe Bonamassa wrote the majority of the band's debut album together in a matter of days. Producer Kevin Shirley, drummer Jason Bonham and keyboardist Derek Sherinian later contributed to several tracks. Speaking about the writing process in an interview with EspyRock, Hughes explained that he wrote four songs in December 2009 and presented them to the rest of the band in the new year, adding that he later "locked Joe away in my house for three afternoons on three different Thursdays for three hours at a time ... and we just sat down and wrote all the songs you're hearing in my studio". Added to the original tracks was a cover version of "Medusa", originally recorded by Hughes' former band Trapeze in 1970.

Recording was also completed quickly, both due to each individual band members' ongoing schedules and commitments, as well as the preference of the group – Hughes has noted that he likes to work "under the gun", while Bonamassa has suggested that he and Shirley do not believe in "spending too much time meandering in the studio". In the liner notes for the album, Bonham claims that "It took only 4 days to lay down the basic tracks and 10 days to record and mix the entire album". Similarly, Hughes claims that "The album was recorded, totally, in five or six days". Most of the recording took place at Shangri-La in Malibu, California, with additional overdubs tracked at Shirley's Malibu studio The Cave and Germano Studios in New York City.

== Promotion and release ==
Black Country Communion was officially announced on June 10, 2010. The first song to be released from the album was "One Last Soul", which was premiered on British radio station Planet Rock on August 2. The track was later made available as a free digital download on the band's official website. The album was released in the UK and Europe by Mascot Records on September 20, 2010, and in North America by Bonamassa's own label J&R Adventures the following day. On the night of its European release, the band played its first official show at the John Henry Rehearsal Studios in London in front of a limited crowd of "around 75–100 people". The performance was broadcast on Planet Rock that night, and again later on September 24. In promotion of the album, BCC played two shows in the UK at the end of the year – the first at the Wolverhampton Civic Hall on December 29, 2010, and the second at the Shepherd's Bush Empire in London the next day.

== Reception ==
=== Commercial ===
Black Country Communion debuted at number 54 on the US Billboard 200, selling 7,100 copies in its first week. It also registered at number 6 on the Independent Albums chart (the joint-highest the band has achieved to date), number 18 on the Top Rock Albums chart, and number 19 on the Hard Rock Albums chart. In the UK, the album debuted at number 13 on the UK Albums Chart, number 15 on the Scottish Albums Chart, number 1 on the UK Rock & Metal Albums Chart, and number 2 on the UK Independent Albums Chart. It also reached the top 20 in Germany and Sweden, number 32 in the Netherlands, number 50 in Austria, number 54 in Switzerland, number 61 in Italy, number 62 in France, and number 81 in Ireland.

=== Critical ===
Professional ratings
Review scores
Source	Rating
AllMusic	4/5 stars
Mojo	4/5 stars
News of the World	4/5 stars
Uncut	2/5 stars

Media response to Black Country Communion was generally positive. Reviewing the release for AllMusic, Eduardo Rivadavia claimed that the band "delivers the goods for much of this album", suggesting that "Black Country Communion's debut takes the dread out of the supergroup equation". Similarly, Greg Moffitt for the BBC suggested that the band had "defied the odds to deliver a collection that's all gold and no albatross", highlighting tracks such as "Black Country" and "One Last Soul". Mojo magazine's Paul Elliott differentiated BCC from fellow supergroup Them Crooked Vultures by praising the band's "great songs", particularly "One Last Soul" and "Song of Yesterday", concluding that "Black Country Communion is one supergroup that really lives up to its billing". Paul Cole of the Sunday Mercury hailed Black Country Communion as "a great rock and roll album and the assured debut you only get from players at the very top of their game".

Following the release of the album, BCC was recognised in several categories of the Planet Rock End of Year Poll 2010 – the album came third in the Album of the Year poll, while the band won Band of the Year and Best New Band. In announcing the results, Planet Rock praised the band by highlighting "An excellent album, several musicians at the top of their game and a bunch of songs that put the classic in classic rock". Black Country Communion was also included in the Albums of the Year 2010 feature published at the end of the year by Metal Hammer magazine, ranking at number 16 on the list.

== Track listing ==
Black Country Communion track listing
No.	Title	Lyrics	Music	Length
1.	"Black Country"	Glenn Hughes	Hughes; Joe Bonamassa	3:15
2.	"One Last Soul"	Hughes	Hughes; Bonamassa	3:52
3.	"The Great Divide"	Hughes	Hughes; Bonamassa	4:45
4.	"Down Again"	Hughes	Hughes; Bonamassa; Derek Sherinian	5:45
5.	"Beggarman"	Hughes	Hughes	4:51
6.	"Song of Yesterday"	Bonamassa; Hughes; Kevin Shirley	Bonamassa; Shirley	8:33
7.	"No Time"	Hughes	Hughes	4:18
8.	"Medusa"	Hughes	Hughes	6:56
9.	"The Revolution in Me"	Bonamassa	Bonamassa; Sherinian	4:59
10.	"Stand (At the Burning Tree)"	Hughes	Hughes; Bonamassa	7:01
11.	"Sista Jane"	Hughes	Hughes; Bonamassa	6:54
12.	"Too Late for the Sun"	Hughes	Hughes; Bonamassa; Sherinian; Jason Bonham; Shirley	11:21
Total length:				72:30

== Personnel ==
Black Country Communion

- Glenn Hughes – bass, vocals (lead on all except tracks 6 and 9)
- Joe Bonamassa – guitar, vocals (lead on tracks 6 and 9, co-lead on tracks 11 and 12)
- Jason Bonham – drums
- Derek Sherinian – keyboards

Additional personnel

- Patrick D'Arcy – uilleann pipes, tin whistle
- Jeff Bova – orchestration
- Kevin Shirley – production, mixing
- James McCullagh – engineering
- Eric Lynne – engineering
- Bob Ludwig – mastering
- Dennis Friel Art Studios – art direction, design, illustrations
- Robert Knight – photography
- Marty Temme – photography
- Rick Gould – photography
- Christie Goodwin – photography
- Chris Callaway – photography

== Charts ==
Chart performance for Black Country Communion
Chart (2010)	Peak position
Austrian Albums (Ö3 Austria Top 40)	50
Dutch Albums (MegaCharts)	32
French Albums (SNEP)	62
German Albums (Offizielle Top 100)	15
Irish Albums (IRMA)	81
Italian Albums (FIMI)	61
Scottish Albums (OCC)	15
Swedish Albums (Sverigetopplistan)	19
Swiss Albums (Schweizer Hitparade)	54
UK Albums (OCC)	13
UK Album Downloads (OCC)	39
UK Independent Albums (OCC)	2
UK Rock & Metal Albums (OCC)	1
US Billboard 200	54
US Hard Rock Albums (Billboard)	19
US Independent Albums (Billboard)	6
US Top Rock Albums (Billboard)	18
