= Black Country Communion =

American rock band

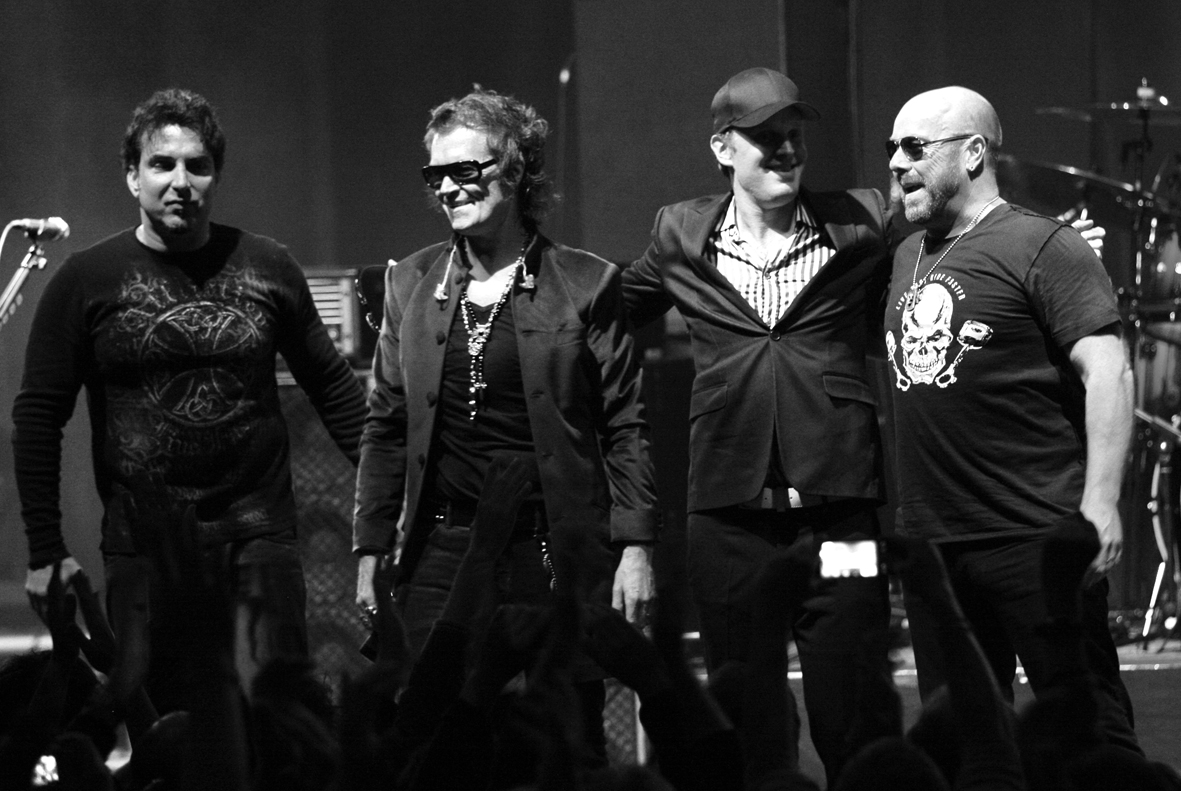
- Black Country Communion in 2011. From left to right: Derek Sherinian, Glenn Hughes, Joe Bonamassa and Jason Bonham.

Background information
- Origin: Los Angeles, California, U.S.
- Genres: Hard rock; blues rock
- Years active: 2009–2013; 2016–present
- Labels: J&R Adventures; Mascot
- Spinoffs: California Breed
- Members: Glenn Hughes; Joe Bonamassa; Jason Bonham; Derek Sherinian
- Website: bccommunion.com

Black Country Communion is an English-American hard rock band based in Los Angeles, California. Formed in 2009, the band is a supergroup composed of bassist and lead vocalist Glenn Hughes, guitarist and second vocalist Joe Bonamassa, drummer Jason Bonham, and keyboardist Derek Sherinian.

Hughes and Bonamassa started the side project in November 2009 after an impromptu performance together. From the advice of their producer, Kevin Shirley, they recruited Bonham and Sherinian to finalize the band's lineup. The name Black Country Communion is derived from the term Black Country, which refers to an area of the West Midlands of England where Hughes and Bonham grew up. The group's sound is intentionally reminiscent of popular classic rock groups of the 1970s, reflecting the previous work of frontman Hughes (in bands such as Trapeze and Deep Purple) as well as the link between Bonham and his father John's band Led Zeppelin.

After playing together for a while, the group released its self-titled debut album in 2010. Black Country Communion 2 followed the next year, which was promoted on the group's first concert tour of the US and Europe. The band released its third album Afterglow in 2012. Early the next year, Bonamassa left and Black Country Communion subsequently broke up, with Hughes and Bonham forming California Breed shortly thereafter. In 2016, Hughes and Bonamassa reconciled and the band returned, with BCCIV released the following year. In 2024, the group released its fifth album, V.

== History ==
=== 2009–10: Formation and debut album ===
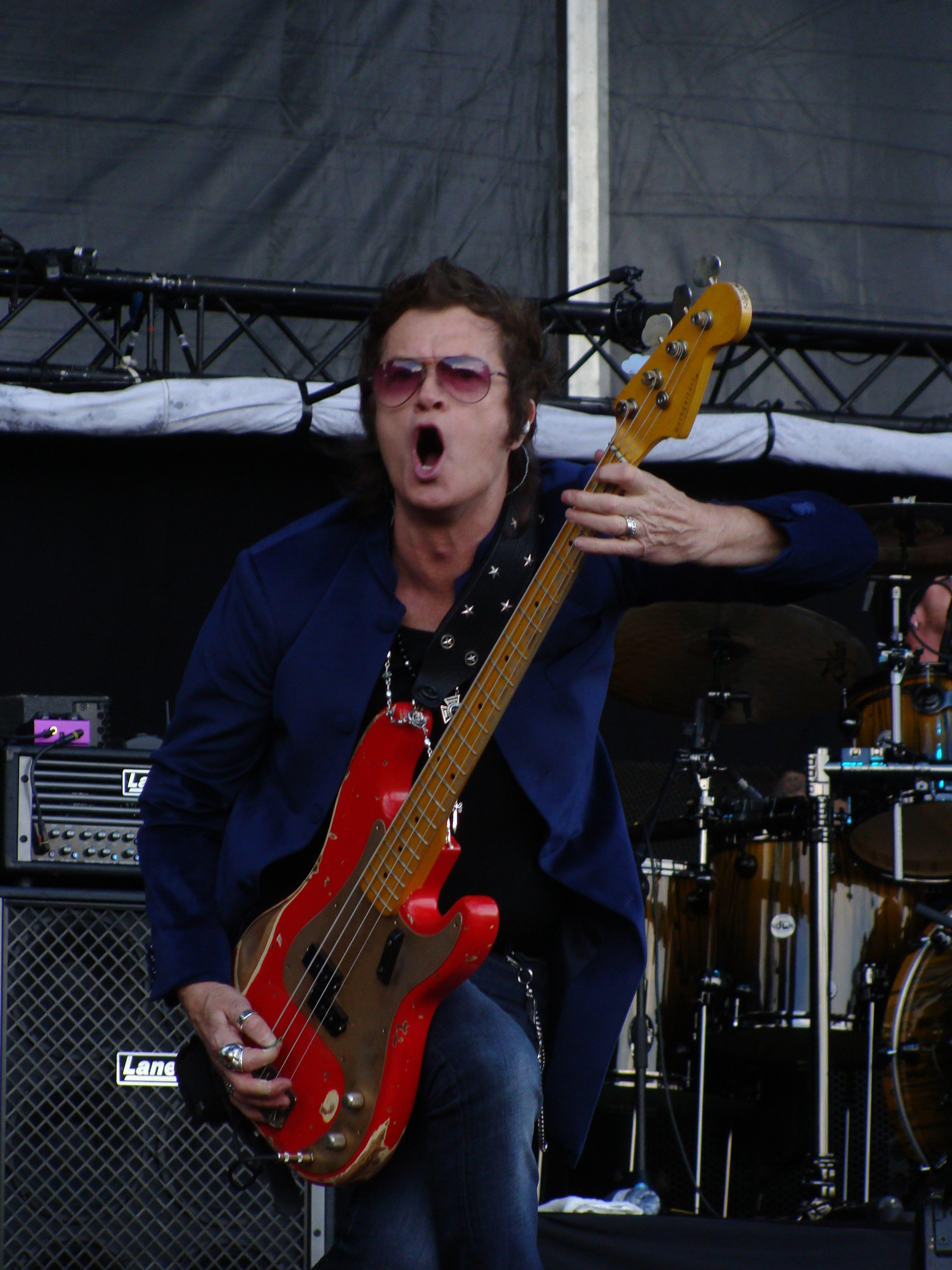
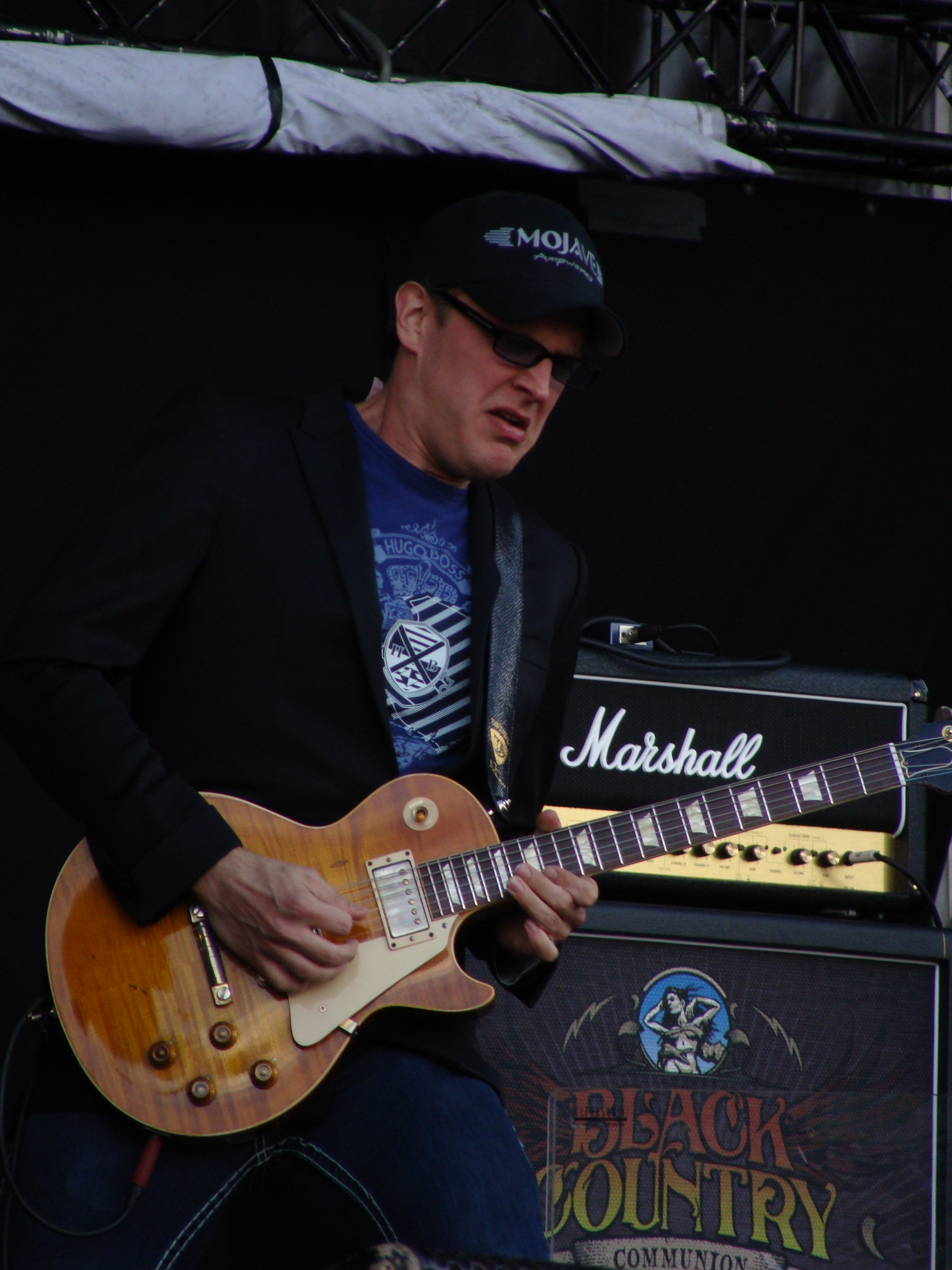
Glenn Hughes and Joe Bonamassa formed Black Country Communion in November 2009.

Glenn Hughes and Joe Bonamassa first met at the 2006 NAMM Show in Anaheim, California, after which they jammed together at Hughes' studio in Hollywood with the idea to make music together in the future. Bonamassa also worked with Jason Bonham that year, when the drummer performed on the guitarist's fifth studio album You & Me on the recommendation of producer and mutual friend Kevin Shirley. Hughes and Bonamassa reunited three years later in November 2009, performing together at the House of Blues in Los Angeles for Guitar Center. It was at this point that the two decided to form a new band. The idea of enlisting Bonham and keyboardist Derek Sherinian to complete the band's lineup was suggested by Shirley, after a second guitarist was briefly considered instead of a keyboardist.

The completed quartet first performed together during the encore at one of Bonamassa's solo shows in Riverside, California on March 17, 2010, playing "One Last Soul" and a cover version of the Deep Purple song "Mistreated". The name Black Country Communion was not finalised until May 2010, after the threat of legal action from another band prevented the group from using the name Black Country. Hughes later revealed that the band in question, from Baltimore, Maryland, reportedly demanded $500,000 for the right to use the name Black Country, a move which he quickly condemned as "just rude". The bassist later elaborated on the situation in a 2016 interview, explaining that his group had successfully bought the name Black Country from the Baltimore-based band (for less than the initially touted $500,000), although by the time the case was settled it was too late to use the name and they instead had to continue using the longer moniker Black Country Communion.

The band recorded its debut album at Los Angeles' Shangri-La Studios in early 2010, scheduling a September release through Mascot Records in Europe and Bonamassa's label J&R Adventures in North America. Hughes described the album as "a big British rock statement", comparing the band's sound to that of his previous groups Deep Purple and Black Sabbath, as well as Led Zeppelin. "One Last Soul" was the first song to be released, receiving its worldwide debut on British digital radio station Planet Rock on August 2, 2010. The track was later released as a free digital download on the band's official website. Shortly before the album's release, Planet Rock also broadcast an hour-long documentary featuring exclusive interviews with the band and a selection of tracks from the album.

Black Country Communion was officially released in Europe on September 20, 2010, and in North America a day later. On the night of its European release, the band played its first official show at the John Henry Rehearsal Studios in London, in front of a limited crowd of "around 75–100 people". The performance was broadcast on Planet Rock that night, and again later on September 24. The album was a commercial success in the UK, reaching number 13 on the UK Albums Chart and topping the UK Rock Albums Chart, while in the US it peaked at number 54 on the Billboard 200 albums chart. It also received mainly positive reviews from music critics, including four-star reviews from AllMusic reviewer Eduardo Rivadavia and Mojo writer Paul Elliott. The band did not tour in promotion of the album, playing just two shows in the UK at the Wolverhampton Civic Hall and London's Shepherd's Bush Empire. At the end of the year, Black Country Communion won the Planet Rock awards for Band of the Year and Best New Band.

=== 2010–12: Second album and touring ===
Talk of a second album began to circulate as early as October 2010, just a month after the release of Black Country Communion, when Bonham estimated that the band would start recording again in January 2011. By December, Hughes had already written nine tracks for the album, which he suggested would serve as a direct sequel to the first album. The album was scheduled for release in June 2011, with the band set to embark on a promotional tour to coincide with its release. "The Outsider" was released as a free digital download on the band's website in May, followed by a music video for "Man in the Middle" the next month. The album was released on June 13, 2011 in Europe and the following day in North America, selling over 8,000 copies in its first week in the US (compared to the 7,100 units of Black Country Communion) but only debuting on the Billboard 200 chart at number 71. The album was also less successful on the UK Albums Chart, peaking at number 23 (ten places lower than its predecessor).

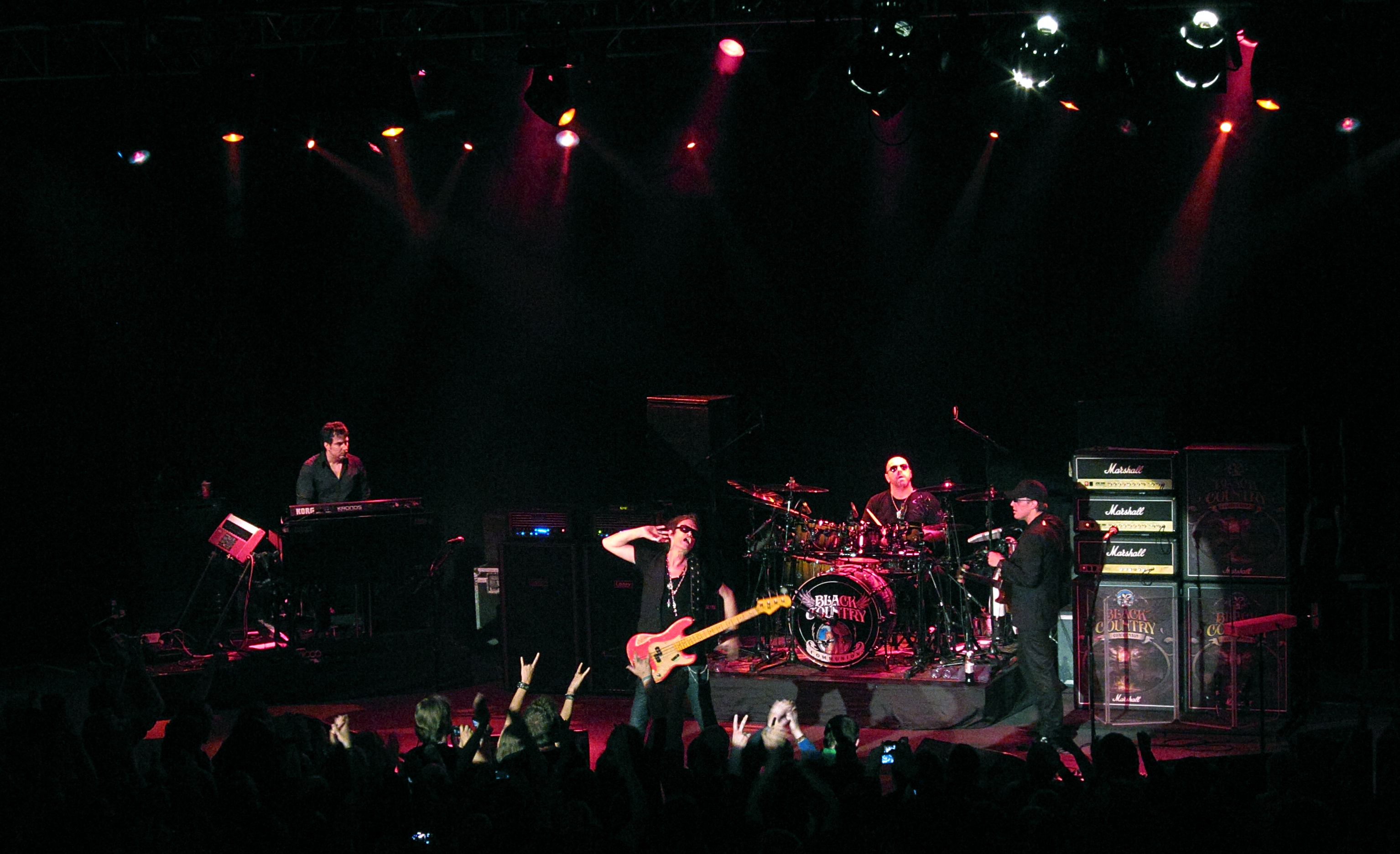
In 2011, the band embarked on its debut tour to promote Black Country Communion 2.

In promotion of Black Country Communion 2, the band completed a short tour of Europe between June and July supported by the Michael Schenker Group. The group also performed in the US for the first time on the Black Country Communion 2 cycle, playing a total of seven shows in six states between June 10 and 19, 2011. The band's first live video album, Live Over Europe, recorded during the summer tour of Europe, was released in October 2011 and screened in a select number of Vue Cinemas across the UK and Ireland the next month. At the end of the year, the group won the Classic Rock award for Breakthrough Act of the Year.

=== 2012–13: Afterglow and disbandment ===
The band returned to the studio in June 2012 to record the follow-up to Black Country Communion 2. Discussing the direction of the group's third album, Hughes explained that it serves as "a continuation of the first and second albums", while also containing "darker [material]" and "moments of drama". The first track released from the album was "Confessor", which was made available as a free download on the band's official website from September 19, 2012. Afterglow was released the next month, reaching number 29 in the UK and number 48 in the US. Black Country Communion scheduled a one-off show at the Wolverhampton Civic Hall on January 5, 2013, with a video release of the concert planned for later in the year. However, it was later announced that the concert had been cancelled due to "unforeseen circumstances". The band's producer Kevin Shirley offered an apology to fans the next day, suggesting that the show would be rescheduled at a later date.

Speaking in August 2012, Hughes doubted the long-term future of the band by suggesting that Afterglow "just may be [the band's last album]", blaming the band's lack of regular touring (due in part to Joe Bonamassa's busy solo touring schedule) as a hindrance to the group's continued success. He later clarified his comments by stating that they "were fuelled from frustration and aimed at motivating other members of the group to commit to a proper touring schedule", adding that if the band was unable to tour regularly then he would seek another band which could. Later, both Bonamassa and Hughes both mentioned that they were "ready to move on" from Black Country Communion.

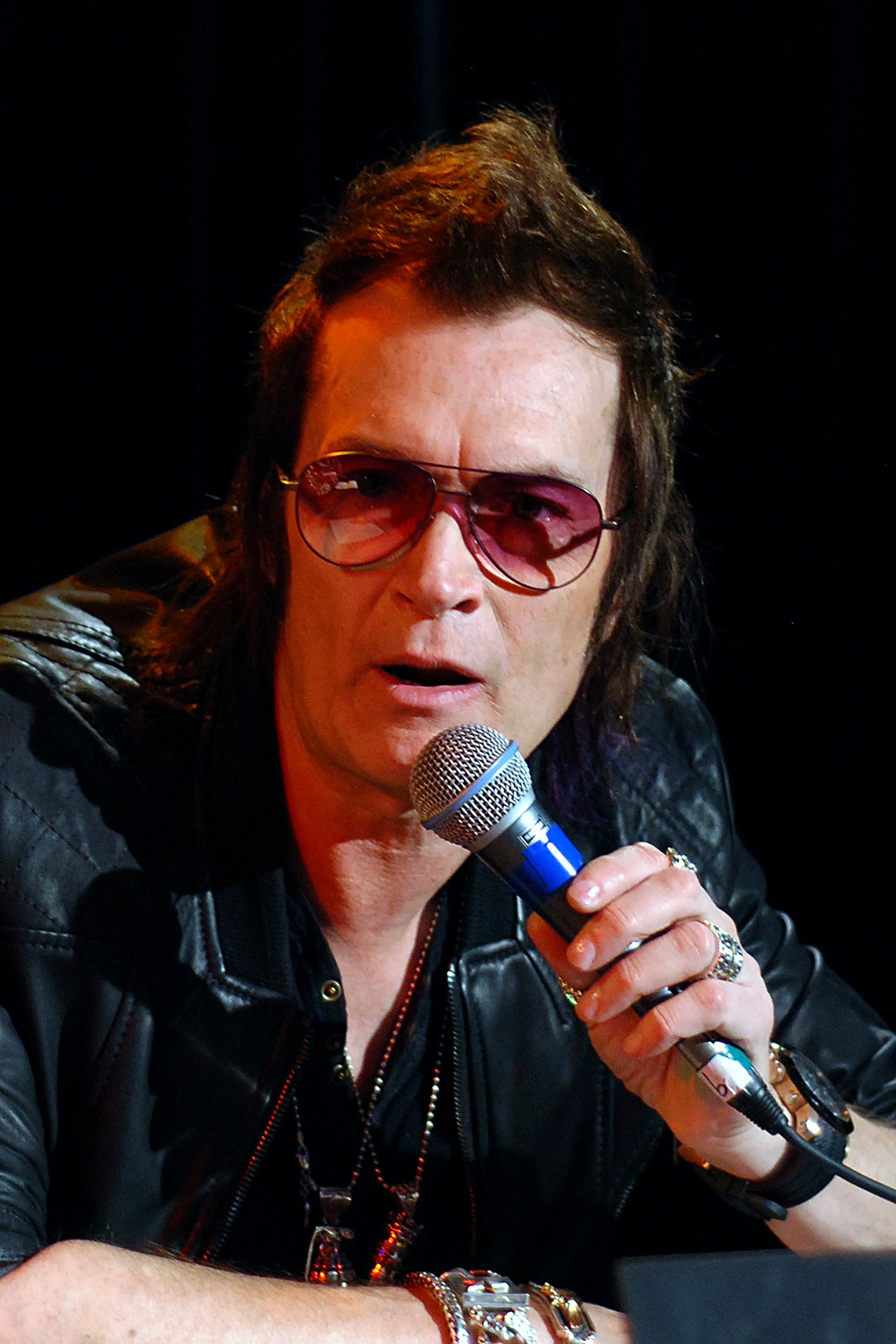
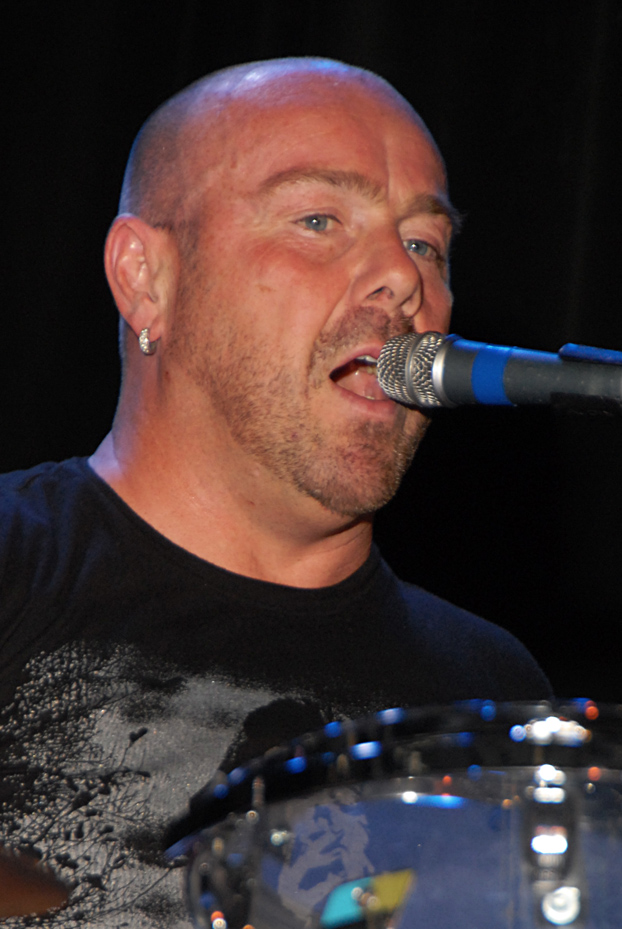
After Black Country Communion's breakup in 2013, Hughes and Bonham formed California Breed with guitarist Andrew Watt.

Bonamassa eventually responded to rumors that he was to leave Black Country Communion, condemning Hughes' "bullying" of the guitarist to complete the planned 2013 show despite knowing that he was not able to, as well as the way in which he publicly revealed the tensions in the band and his claim of being the sole songwriter on Afterglow. Bonham also revealed his frustration with the situation, while Bonamassa's manager and business partner Roy Weisman admitted that it was his decision to cancel the Wolverhampton gig, based on Hughes's actions. On March 13, 2013, Bonamassa announced that he was "happily not involved any more" with Black Country Communion. Ten days later, Hughes confirmed that the band was over, revealing that Bonamassa would not allow the remaining members to continue with the Black Country Communion name. Speaking about the future, he hinted that "Jason, Derek and I will continue with a different name when the time is right". In August 2013, Sherinian joined Bonamassa's solo band as a full-time member, and in February 2014, Hughes and Bonham unveiled a new band with guitarist Andrew Watt named California Breed.

=== 2016–present: Reformation, BCCIV and V ===
In April 2016, it was announced that Black Country Communion would be reuniting in 2017 to record a fourth album. Speaking about the supergroup's comeback, Bonham explained that the reunion was initially suggested by Bonamassa, who reached out to the other band members with the proposal. Hughes and Bonamassa started writing new music for the forthcoming album in September, with recording beginning the following January. The album, entitled BCCIV, was released on September 22, 2017, and was promoted at two UK shows in January 2018. BCCIV was the band's first release to reach the top ten of the UK Albums Chart.

After the band's members returned to their respective solo careers, Bonham suggested in 2018 that Black Country Communion would be potentially returning to the studio the following January to start work on a new album. However, Hughes later estimated that the band would likely not have time to work on new music until 2020. This schedule was subsequently pushed back another year, when the bassist explained that "Joe [Bonamassa] and I have been talking ... for nine months now about album number five. At the moment ... we're looking at January 2021 to record." Subsequently, due to the COVID-19 pandemic, this schedule was pushed for another year with possible work for new studio album not commencing until late 2021 with new studio album coming in 2022 at earliest, as iterated by Bonamassa, who also said that they still exist as a band: "We had on the books, we were gonna attempt a record in January 2021, but the timeline got pushed back. So it'll probably be a year from there — at the end of 2021. But, yeah, we're still a band, and we still all text each other and talk and stuff like that." Bonamassa later stated that he and Hughes would start writing in October 2022, with the hope of recording the band's fifth album in 2023.

BCC announced its first live shows in six years in March 2023, with the band set to perform on the Keeping the Blues Alive at Sea cruise a year later. The group released its fifth album V in June 2024, with lead single "Stay Free" issued on March 1.

== Style and songwriting ==
As a supergroup, Black Country Communion's style is often described as a mix of various different sounds and influences. Particular significance is attributed to the band's mix of blues rock (attributed primarily to Bonamassa's work within the genre) and hard rock (originating from Hughes' previous work with Deep Purple and Black Sabbath and from Bonham's tie with Led Zeppelin via his father John), with some critics going as far as to claim that the group's sound is based on "the vintage Deep Purple template". In reviews for the band's second album, a number of critics compared the sound of the group to that of Led Zeppelin – Eduardo Rivadavia of website AllMusic noted that the album "sounds like the baby of drummer Jason Bonham", while Paul Cole of the Sunday Mercury claimed that it is "haunted by the spirit of Zeppelin". Hughes has dubbed the group "a rock and roll band in the true sense of the word".

Traditionally, the lyrical processes for Black Country Communion's albums have been led by Hughes, with Bonamassa only occasionally providing lyrical input. The majority of the music on Black Country Communion was composed by Hughes and Bonamassa, with Sherinian increasing his composition presence for the second album. Noting the extensive touring commitments of Bonamassa, Hughes has claimed that he was "left as the keeper of the keys to write [the band's] albums", noting that for each record – which have been continuations of their predecessors – he has had more and more time to write material (six weeks for Black Country Communion, four months for Black Country Communion 2, six months for Afterglow). Bonham has described the band's writing style as "spur of the moment".

== Band members ==
- Glenn Hughes – bass, lead and backing vocals
- Joe Bonamassa – guitar, backing and lead vocals
- Jason Bonham – drums, percussion, backing vocals
- Derek Sherinian – keyboards
Black Country Communion performing at the Wolverhampton Civic Hall in 2018.

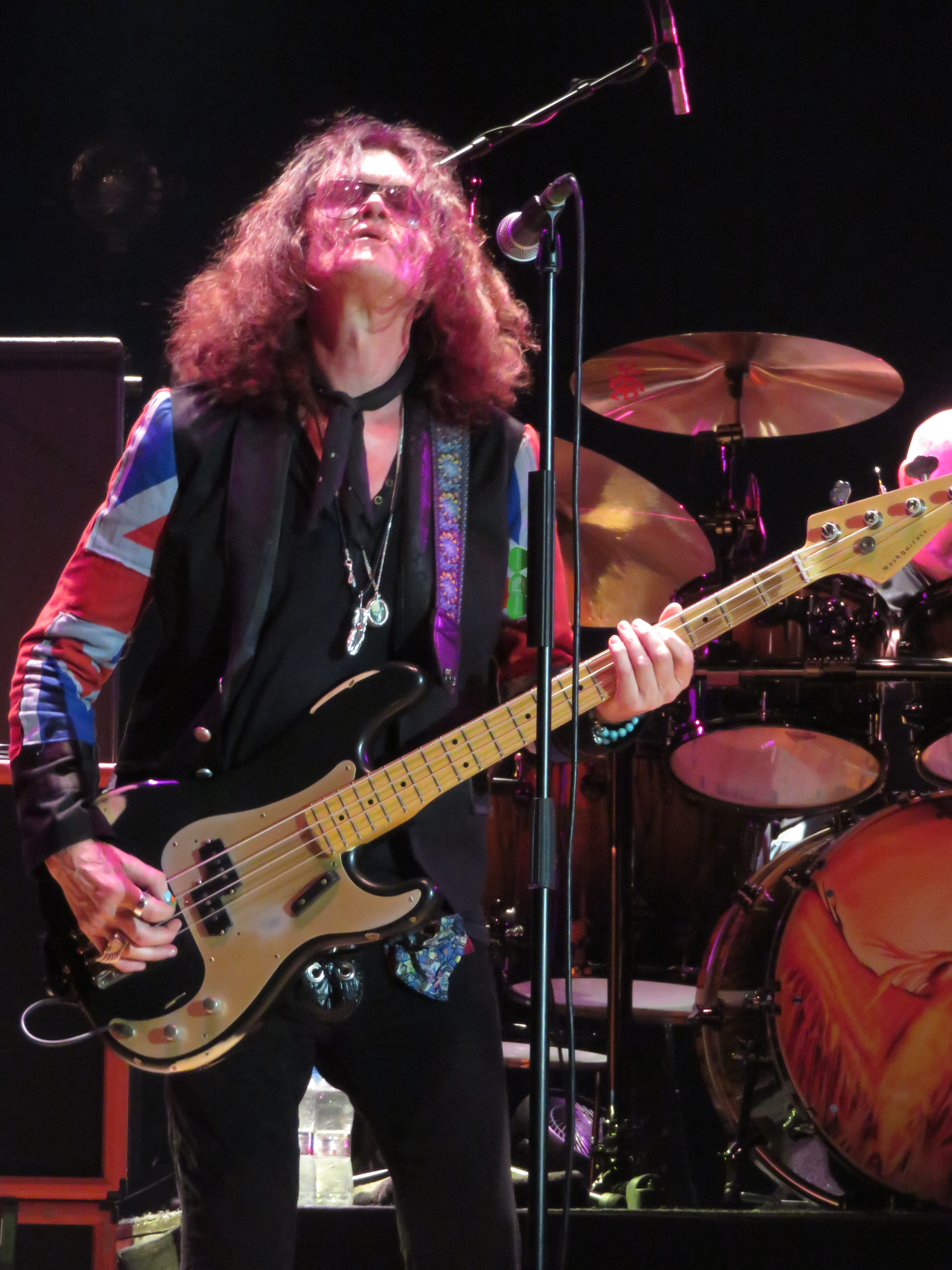
Hughes

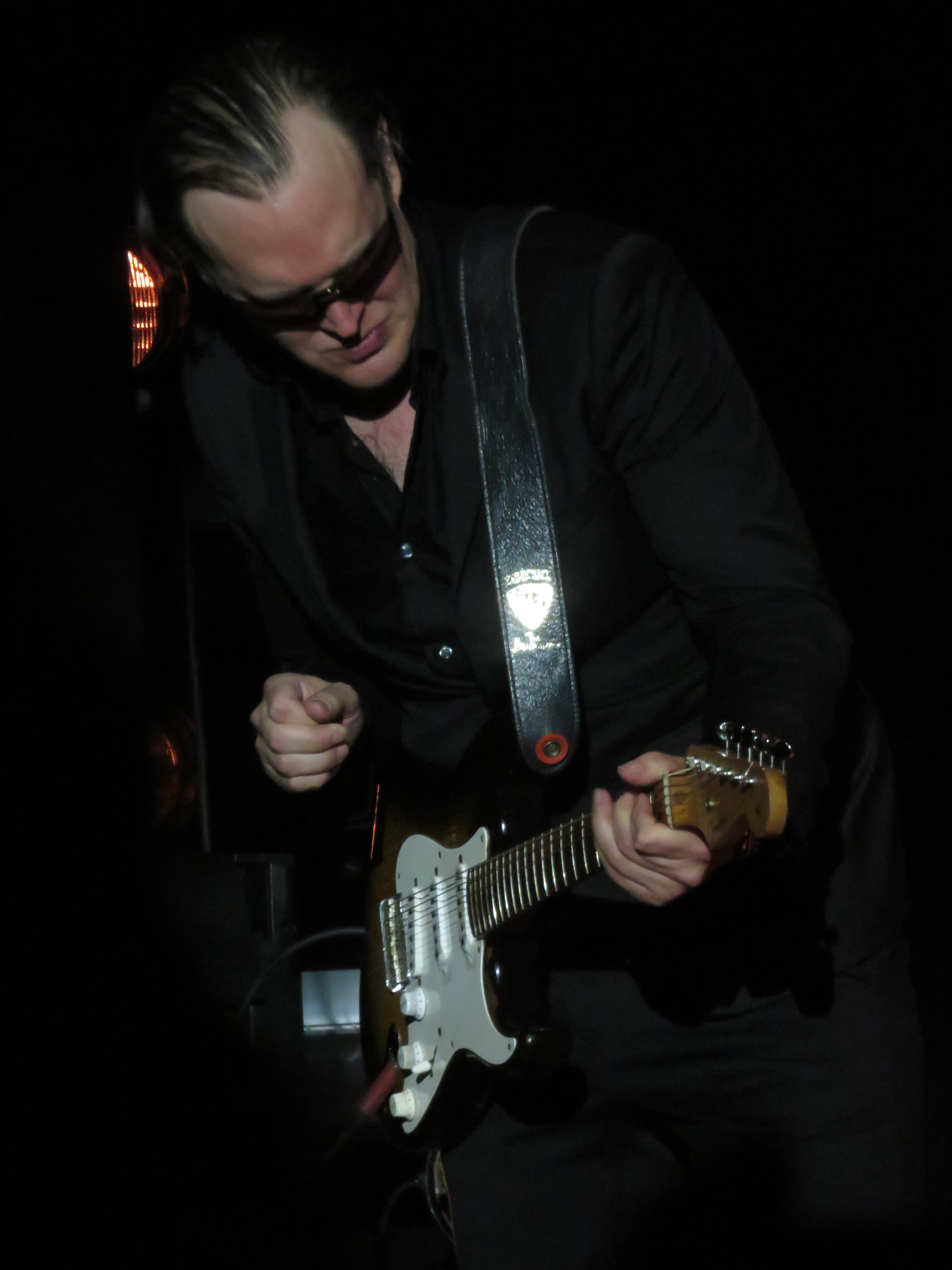
Bonamassa

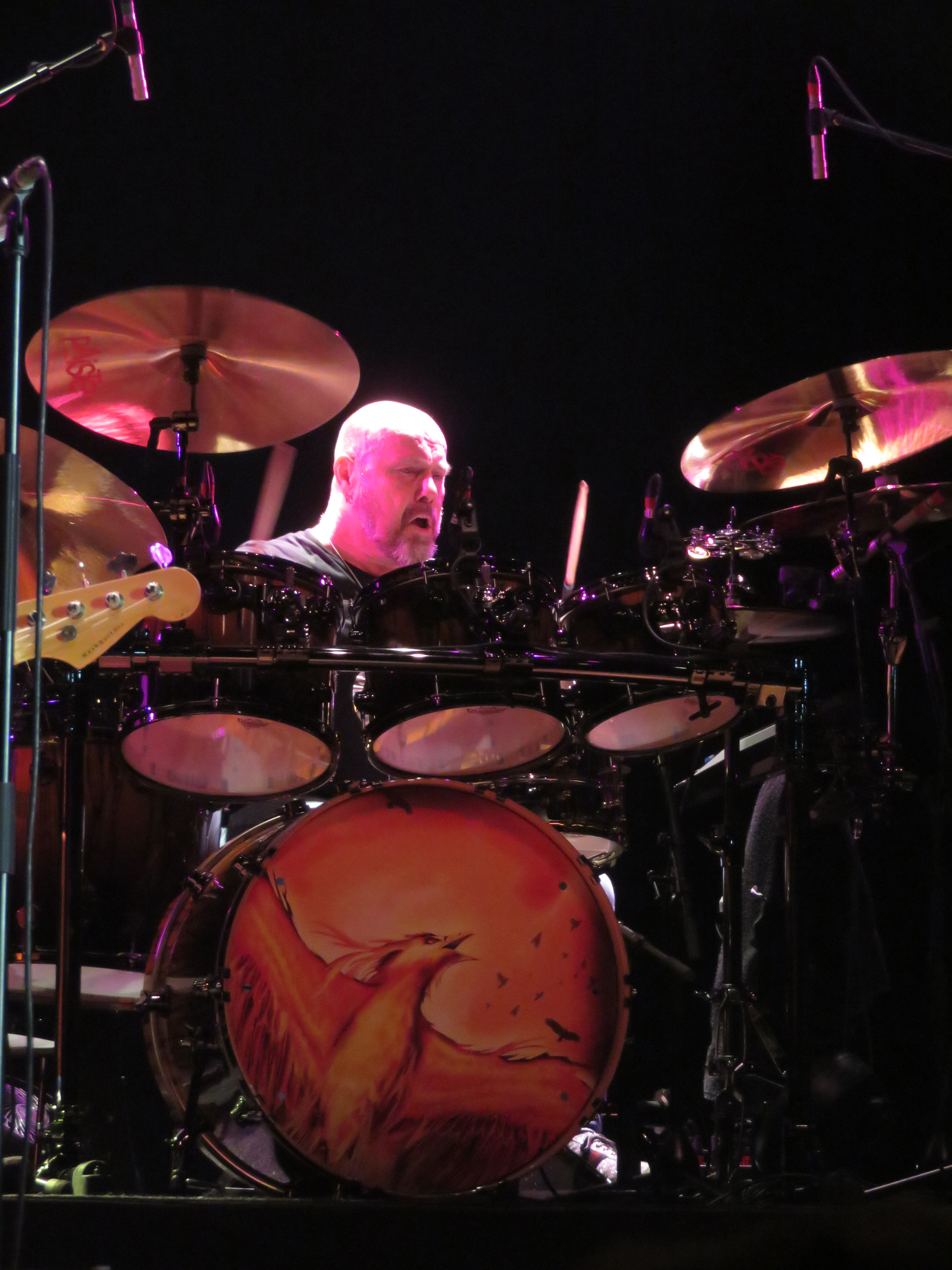
Bonham

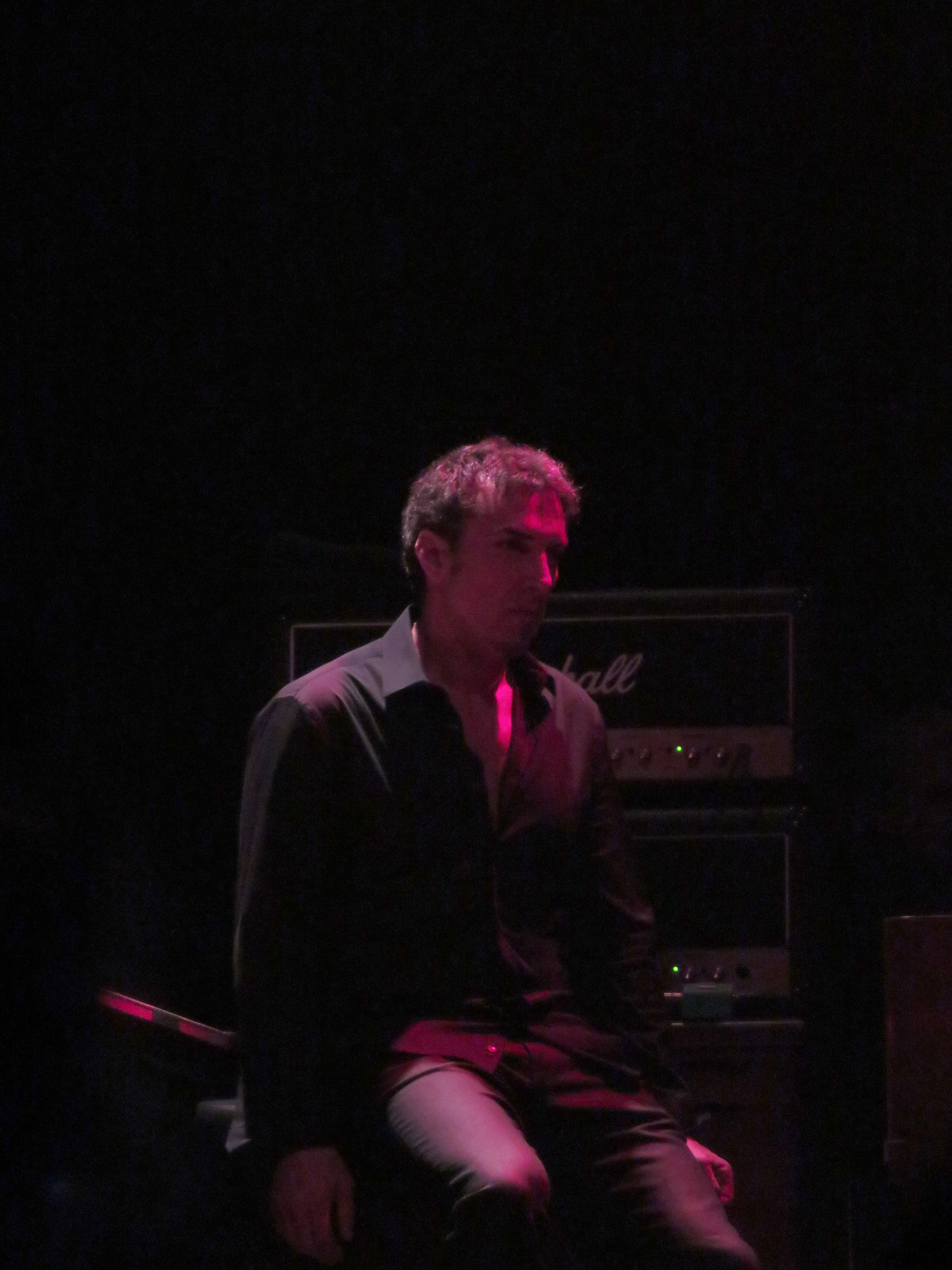
Sherinian

== Discography ==
- Black Country Communion (2010)
- Black Country Communion 2 (2011)
- Afterglow (2012)
- BCCIV (2017)
- V (2024)
