= Black Country Communion 2 =

Studio album by Black Country Communion
- Released: June 13, 2011
- Recorded: January – February 2011
- Studio: EastWest Studios (Hollywood, California); The Cave Studios (Malibu, California)
- Genre: Hard rock; blues rock
- Length: 64:17
- Label: Mascot; J&R Adventures
- Producer: Kevin Shirley

Black Country Communion chronology
Black Country Communion (2010)	Black Country Communion 2 (2011)	Live Over Europe (2011)

Black Country Communion 2 (also known simply as 2) is the second studio album by English–American hard rock band Black Country Communion. Recorded between January and February 2011, primarily at EastWest Studios in Hollywood, California, it was produced by Kevin Shirley and released in Europe by Mascot Records on June 13, 2011, and in North America by J&R Adventures the next day. The album reached number 23 on the UK Albums Chart and number 71 on the US Billboard 200.

Writing for Black Country Communion's second album began before the release of the band's self-titled debut in 2010, with bassist Glenn Hughes and guitarist Joe Bonamassa again leading the process. Producer Kevin Shirley increased his contribution to songwriting on the album, with credits on all but three tracks, compared to only two on the debut. As with Black Country Communion, Hughes performed lead vocals on the majority of songs, with Bonamassa leading on two tracks.

Black Country Communion 2 received positive reviews from the majority of critics, many of whom praised the album as a more coherent, balanced collection of songs than its predecessor. The album was promoted on a concert tour during June and July 2011 featuring shows in the United States and Europe, some of which were documented on the live video album Live Over Europe, released later in the year. One music video was released from the record, for the track "Man in the Middle".

== Writing and recording ==
Black Country Communion (BCC) frontman Glenn Hughes began writing material for the group's second album before their self-titled debut had been released. In contrast to the first album, for which material was written quickly, Hughes spent six months between May and December 2010 writing material for Black Country Communion 2, liaising with producer Kevin Shirley. In October that year, drummer Jason Bonham suggested in an interview that recording for the album was scheduled to begin in January 2011. Hughes later shared on January 11, 2011 that the band had recorded its first song for the new album, which he estimated would be released in June. Recording was completed within two and a half weeks, which guitarist Joe Bonamassa claimed was "more time than [the band] actually needed". Hughes described the recording process for Black Country Communion 2 as "a little easier" than that of the first album, due to the increased chemistry between band members by that time.

== Promotion and release ==
Black Country Communion 2 was officially announced on March 17, 2011, with the track listing revealed the following week. "Cold" was the first song from the album to be performed live, when Hughes played an acoustic arrangement of the track on a Spanish radio station on April 11. The first song to be officially released from the album was "The Outsider", which premiered on British radio station Planet Rock on May 5, 2011. The track was later made available as a free digital download on the band's official website. "Man in the Middle" was released on June 6, along with a music video directed by Davin Maske. Black Country Communion 2 was released in the UK and Europe by Mascot Records on June 13, 2011, and in North America by Bonamassa's label J&R Adventures the following day.

In promotion of their second album, Black Country Communion embarked on their first concert tour, beginning with seven shows in the United States between June 9 and 19, 2011. The tour also featured 14 dates in Europe between June 23 and July 30, including appearances at festivals such as Azkena Rock Festival in Spain, Bospop in the Netherlands and High Voltage in the UK. The Michael Schenker Group supported Black Country Communion on the European tour. In October, the band released their first video album Live Over Europe, which featured footage from three shows in Germany. The video reached the top ten in several regions, including number 8 on the UK Music Video Chart. The following February, Live Over Europe was issued as a live album.

== Reception ==
=== Commercial ===
Black Country Communion 2 debuted at number 71 on the US Billboard 200, selling over 8,000 copies in its first week. It also registered at number 6 on the Hard Rock Albums chart, number 10 on the Independent Albums chart, and number 19 on the Top Rock Albums chart. In the UK, the album debuted at number 23 on the UK Albums Chart, number 18 on the Scottish Albums Chart, number 1 on the UK Rock & Metal Albums Chart, and number 6 on the UK Independent Albums Chart. It also reached number 15 in Germany and Switzerland, number 17 in Austria, number 20 in Denmark, number 24 in Sweden, number 26 in Norway, number 56 in the Netherlands, number 74 in the Flanders region of Belgium, number 84 in the Wallonia region of Belgium, and number 118 in France.

=== Critical ===
Professional ratings
Aggregate scores
Source	Rating
Metacritic	75/100
Review scores
Source	Rating
AllMusic	4/5 stars
Classic Rock	4/5 stars
Financial Times	3/5 stars
Kerrang!	4/5 stars
PopMatters	7/10 stars
The Times	3/5 stars

Media response to Black Country Communion 2 was generally positive; aggregating website Metacritic reports a normalised rating of 75, based on six critical reviews. Reviewing the release for AllMusic, Eduardo Rivadavia claimed that the album "arguably tops its worthy predecessor as a balanced song set", although suggested that it lacks any clear highlights in the vein of "Black Country" or "One Last Soul" from the band's self-titled debut. Similarly, Mick Wall of Classic Rock praised the album's coherent composition and production, describing it as "clearly less of a 'project' than the first BCC disc, and more the real deal". Wall hailed the "depth and artistry" of Black Country Communion 2, which he claimed was most prominent on songs such as "The Outsider", "The Battle for Hadrian's Wall" and "Cold". The Independent columnist Nick Coleman compared the album favourably to the band's debut, which he shunned as "a ghastly glued-together assemblage of clichés and show-off playing". Kerrang! suggested that Black Country Communion 2 "possibly betters [the band's] acclaimed debut". Paul Cole of the Sunday Mercury praised the contributions of each band member in his review, concluding that "This is classic rock goes large, an album that lives up to its heritage. It may not be bettered this year."

Multiple critics compared the album's sound to that of 1970s acts such as Deep Purple, Black Sabbath and Led Zeppelin. Rivadavia claimed that "so many of [the album's] songs show no qualms about getting the "Led" out", but added that "Far from descending into a pale imitation ... however, BCC's offerings rise above and fly true thanks to the unimpeachable pedigree and recognizable musical personalities of all involved". PopMatters writer Jedd Beaudoin concluded his review of the album with the admission that "It's retread music, purely, simply, unapologetically. So what?" Coleman of The Independent claimed that the album "feels much more like a group searching for a sound together, even if the sound once belonged in a Venn diagram linking Led Zep, Deep Purple and Dio-era Sabbath". Sunday Mercury writer Cole claimed that the album is "haunted by the spirit of [Led] Zeppelin", adding jokingly to "Close your eyes and it could be 1971 all over again."

Black Country Communion 2 was nominated for the Planet Rock Album of the Year award in 2011. It came third in the poll behind Wasting Light by Foo Fighters and Bonamassa's own Dust Bowl, with the station calling it "a fantastic hard rock record that harks back to a simpler time in rock music when four guys could go into a studio and just play". The band also came fourth in Planet Rock's Best Live Act poll, as well as winning the Classic Rock award for Best Breakthrough Act.

== Track listing ==
Black Country Communion 2 track listing
No.	Title	Lyrics	Music	Length
1.	"The Outsider"	Glenn Hughes	Hughes; Joe Bonamassa; Derek Sherinian; Kevin Shirley	4:23
2.	"Man in the Middle"	Hughes	Hughes; Bonamassa; Shirley	4:35
3.	"The Battle for Hadrian's Wall"	Bonamassa	Bonamassa; Hughes; Shirley	5:10
4.	"Save Me"	Hughes; Jason Bonham	Bonham; Chris Blackwell; Bonamassa; Sherinian; Hughes; Shirley	7:42
5.	"Smokestack Woman"	Hughes	Hughes	5:10
6.	"Faithless"	Hughes	Hughes; Bonamassa; Shirley	5:11
7.	"An Ordinary Son"	Bonamassa; Hughes	Bonamassa; Hughes; Shirley	7:58
8.	"I Can See Your Spirit"	Hughes	Hughes; Bonamassa; Shirley	4:11
9.	"Little Secret"	Hughes	Hughes	6:59
10.	"Crossfire"	Hughes	Hughes	6:03
11.	"Cold"	Hughes	Hughes; Bonamassa; Shirley	6:55
Total length:				64:17

== Personnel ==
Black Country Communion

- Glenn Hughes – bass, vocals (lead on all except tracks 3 and 7)
- Joe Bonamassa – guitar, vocals (lead on tracks 3 and 7)
- Jason Bonham – drums
- Derek Sherinian – keyboards

Additional personnel

- Jeff Bova – orchestration
- Kevin Shirley – production, mixing
- Jeremy Miller – engineering
- Jared Kvitka – engineering
- George Marino – mastering
- Dennis Friel – design
- Christie Goodwin – photography

== Charts ==
Chart performance for Black Country Communion 2
Chart (2011)	Peak position
Austrian Albums (Ö3 Austria Top 40)	17
Belgian Albums (Ultratop Flanders)	74
Belgian Albums (Ultratop Wallonia)	84
Danish Albums (Hitlisten)	20
Dutch Albums (MegaCharts)	56
French Albums (SNEP)	118
German Albums (Offizielle Top 100)	7
Irish Albums (IRMA)	83
Norwegian Albums (VG-lista)	26
Scottish Albums (OCC)	18
Swedish Albums (Sverigetopplistan)	24
Swiss Albums (Schweizer Hitparade)	15
UK Albums (OCC)	23
UK Album Downloads (OCC)	65
UK Independent Albums (OCC)	6
UK Rock & Metal Albums (OCC)	1
US Billboard 200	71
US Hard Rock Albums (Billboard)	6
US Independent Albums (Billboard)	10
US Top Rock Albums (Billboard)	19
