= Shepherds Bush Empire (album) =

Live album by Joe Bonamassa
- Released: December 11, 2007
- Genre: Blues rock
- Length: 49:19
- Label: J&R Adventures
- Producer: Kevin Shirley

Joe Bonamassa chronology
Sloe Gin (2007)	Shepherds Bush Empire (2007)	Live from Nowhere in Particular (2008)

Shepherds Bush Empire is the second live album by American blues rock musician Joe Bonamassa. Produced by Kevin Shirley, it was released on December 11, 2007 by J&R Adventures.

== Track listing ==
No.	Title	Writer(s)	Original album	Length
1.	"Walk in My Shadows"	Paul Rodgers, Paul Kossoff, Andy Fraser, Simon Kirke	A New Day Yesterday (2000)	6:10
2.	"Blues Deluxe"	Jeff Beck, Rod Stewart	Blues Deluxe (2003)	9:26
3.	"Mountain Time"	Joe Bonamassa, Will Jennings	So, It's Like That (2002)	12:43
4.	"Bridge to Better Days"	Bonamassa	You & Me (2006)	5:26
5.	"Just Got Paid" (ZZ Top cover)	Billy Gibbons, Bill Ham	Previously unreleased	15:32
