= Live from the Royal Albert Hall (Joe Bonamassa album) =

Live album by Joe Bonamassa
- Released: September 22, 2009
- Recorded: May 4, 2009
- Venue: Royal Albert Hall, London, England
- Genre: Blues rock
- Length: 132:10
- Label: J&R Adventures
- Producer: Kevin Shirley

Joe Bonamassa chronology
The Ballad of John Henry (2009)	Live from the Royal Albert Hall (2009)	Black Rock (2010)

Live from the Royal Albert Hall is the fourth live album by American blues rock musician Joe Bonamassa. Recorded on May 4, 2009, at the Royal Albert Hall in London, England, it was released on September 22, 2009 by J&R Adventures.

== Reception ==
Professional ratings
Review scores
Source	Rating
AllMusic	4/5 stars
Classic Rock	(DVD)
Record Collector	3/5 stars

Music website AllMusic gave Live from the Royal Albert Hall four out of five stars, with reviewer Steve Leggett describing the album as "simply wonderful, full of great guitar playing, solid singing, and with a horn section and double drummers on board, the sound is full and even majestic".

== Track listing ==
Disc one
No.	Title	Writer(s)	Original album	Length
1.	"Django"	Robert Bosmans, Etienne Lefebvre	You & Me (2006)	3:43
2.	"The Ballad of John Henry"	Joe Bonamassa	The Ballad of John Henry (2009)	6:47
3.	"So, It's Like That"	Bonamassa, Mike Himelstein	So, It's Like That (2002)	2:55
4.	"Last Kiss"	Bonamassa	The Ballad of John Henry (2009)	7:18
5.	"So Many Roads"	Marshall Paul	You & Me (2006)	6:15
6.	"Stop!"	Gregg Sutton, Bruce Brody	The Ballad of John Henry (2009)	5:56
7.	"Further on Up the Road" (with Eric Clapton)	Don Robey, Joe Veasey	Previously unreleased	5:44
8.	"Woke Up Dreaming"	Bonamassa, Will Jennings	Blues Deluxe (2003)	10:06
9.	"High Water Everywhere"	Charlie Patton	You & Me (2006)	5:07
10.	"Sloe Gin"	Bob Ezrin, Michael Kamen	Sloe Gin (2007)	8:18
11.	"Lonesome Road Blues"	Bonamassa	The Ballad of John Henry (2009)	4:37
Total length:				66:56

Disc two
No.	Title	Writer(s)	Original album	Length
12.	"Happier Times"	Bonamassa	The Ballad of John Henry (2009)	7:22
13.	"Your Funeral My Trial" (With Paul Jones)	Willie Williamson	You & Me (2006)	4:05
14.	"Blues Deluxe"	Jeff Beck, Rod Stewart	Blues Deluxe (2003)	9:13
15.	"Story of a Quarryman"	Bonamassa	The Ballad of John Henry (2009)	5:14
16.	"The Great Flood"	Bonamassa	The Ballad of John Henry (2009)	7:52
17.	"Just Got Paid"	Billy Gibbons, Bill Ham	Shepherds Bush Empire (2007)	10:44
18.	"Mountain Time"	Bonamassa, Jennings	So, It's Like That (2002)	10:43
19.	"Asking Around for You"	Bonamassa, Himelstein	You & Me (2006)	10:01
Total length:				65:14

== Personnel ==
Primary musical performers

- Joe Bonamassa – guitar, vocals, liner notes
- Carmine Rojas – bass
- Anton Fig – drums
- Bogie Bowles – drums
- Rick Melick – keyboards, tambourine, backing vocals

Additional musicians

- Sean Freeman – saxophone
- Lee Thornburg – trumpet, brass arrangements
- Mike Feltham – trombone
- Eric Clapton – guitar, vocals (guest appearance)
- Paul Jones – harmonica (guest appearance)

Production personnel

- Kevin Shirley – production, mixing
- Josh Shirley – mixing assistance
- Britannia Row Studios – recording, engineering
- Barry MacLeod – engineering assistance
- Ryan Smith – mastering
- Sam Dunn – direction
- Scot McFadyen – direction
- Dave Pattenden – production
- Lisa Grootenboer – editing
- Dennis Friel – graphic design
- Marcus Bird – photography and direction
- Christine Goodwin – photography

== Chart performance ==
Chart performance for Live from the Royal Albert Hall
Chart (2009)	Peak
Belgian Albums (Ultratop Flanders)	47
US Billboard Top Blues Albums	2

== Certifications ==
Certifications for Live from the Royal Albert Hall
Region	Certification	Certified units/sales
Germany (BVMI)	Gold	25,000^{^}
United Kingdom (BPI)	Gold	25,000^{^}
United States (RIAA)	Platinum	100,000^{^}
^{^} Shipments figures based on certification alone.
