= Live from Nowhere in Particular =

Live album by Joe Bonamassa
- Released: August 19, 2008
- Genre: Blues rock
- Length: 98:48
- Label: J&R Adventures
- Producer: Kevin Shirley

Joe Bonamassa chronology
Shepherds Bush Empire (2007)	Live from Nowhere in Particular (2008)	The Ballad of John Henry (2009)

Live from Nowhere in Particular is the third live album by American blues rock musician Joe Bonamassa. Produced by Kevin Shirley, it was released on August 19, 2008 by J&R Adventures and topped the US Billboard Top Blues Albums chart.

Professional ratings
Review scores
Source	Rating
Allmusic	3.5/5 stars

== Track listing ==
Disc one
No.	Title	Writer(s)	Original album	Length
1.	"Bridge to Better Days"	Joe Bonamassa	You & Me (2006)	5:28
2.	"Walk in My Shadows"	Paul Rodgers, Paul Kossoff, Andy Fraser, Simon Kirke	A New Day Yesterday (2000)	5:15
3.	"So Many Roads"	Paul Marshall	You & Me (2006)	6:12
4.	"India/Mountain Time"	Bonamassa, Rick Melick/Bonamassa, Will Jennings	Sloe Gin (2007)/So, It's Like That (2002)	10:20
5.	"Another Kinda Love"	John Mayall	Sloe Gin (2007)	3:52
6.	"Sloe Gin"	Bob Ezrin, Michael Kamen	Sloe Gin (2007)	7:22
7.	"One of These Days"	Bonamassa, Alvin Lee	Sloe Gin (2007)	5:45
Total length:				44:24

Disc two
No.	Title	Writer(s)	Original album	Length
8.	"Ball Peen Hammer"	Chris Whitley	Sloe Gin (2007)	4:23
9.	"If Heartaches Were Nickels"	Warren Haynes	A New Day Yesterday (2000)	4:08
10.	"Woke Up Dreaming"	Bonamassa, Jennings	Blues Deluxe (2003)	7:59
11.	"Django/Just Got Paid"	Robert Bosmans, Etienne Lefebvre/Billy Gibbons, Bill Ham	You & Me (2006)/Shepherds Bush Empire (2007)	17:52
12.	"High Water Everywhere"	Charlie Patton	You & Me (2006)	4:48
13.	"Asking Around for You"	Bonamassa, Mike Himelstein	You & Me (2006)	7:24
14.	"A New Day Yesterday/Starship Trooper: Würm"	Ian Anderson/Jon Anderson, Steve Howe, Chris Squire	A New Day Yesterday (2000)/The Yes Album (1971)	7:50
Total length:				54:24

== Chart performance ==
Chart (2007)	Peak
US Billboard 200	136
US Billboard Top Blues Albums	1
Dutch Albums Chart	31
Swiss Albums Chart	43
UK Albums Chart	45

== Personnel ==
Musical performers

- Joe Bonamassa – guitar, vocals
- Carmine Rojas – bass
- Bogie Bowles – drums
- Rick Melick – keyboards

Production personnel

- Jay Phebus – recording
- Kevin Shirley – production, mixing
- Justin Pintar – mixing assistance
- Ryan Smith – mastering

Additional personnel

- Dennis Friel – graphic design
- Ross Halfin – photography
