= Live at Rockpalast (Joe Bonamassa album) =

Video by Joe Bonamassa
- Released: February 7, 2006
- Recorded: June 28, 2005 on Rockpalast, Germany
- Genre: Blues rock
- Label: Premier Artists

Joe Bonamassa chronology
A New Day Yesterday Live (2002)	Live at Rockpalast (2006)	Live from the Royal Albert Hall (2009)

Live at Rockpalast is the first live video by American blues rock musician Joe Bonamassa. Recorded on June 28, 2005, for the German television show Rockpalast, it was released on February 7, 2006, by Premier Artists.

== Track listing ==
Disc one
No.	Title	Writer(s)	Original album	Length
1.	"Takin' the Hit"	Joe Bonamassa, Mike Himelstein	So, It's Like That (2002)
2.	"A New Day Yesterday" (Jethro Tull cover)	Ian Anderson	A New Day Yesterday (2000)
3.	"Blues Deluxe"	Jeff Beck, Rod Stewart	Blues Deluxe (2003)
4.	"Mountain Time"	Bonamassa, Will Jennings	So, It's Like That (2002)
5.	"You Upset Me Baby"	Riley King, Joe Bihari	Blues Deluxe (2003)
6.	"The River"	Bonamassa, Bob Held	Had to Cry Today (2004)
7.	"Burning Hell"	John Lee Hooker, Bernard Besman	Blues Deluxe (2003)
8.	"Had to Cry Today" (Blind Faith cover)	Steve Winwood	Had to Cry Today (2004)
9.	"Heart of the Sunrise" (Yes cover)	Jon Anderson, Chris Squire, Bill Bruford	Fragile (1971)
10.	"Starship Trooper" (Yes cover)	J. Anderson, Steve Howe, Squire	The Yes Album (1971)
11.	"I Don't Live Anywhere"	Bonamassa, Himelstein	Blues Deluxe (2003)

== Personnel ==
Musical performers

- Joe Bonamassa – guitar, vocals
- Eric Czar – bass
- Kenny Kramme – drums
