= Dust Bowl (disambiguation) =

The Dust Bowl was a period of severe dust storms during the 1930s Depression Era.

Dust Bowl or Dustbowl may also refer to:

- The Dust Bowl (film), a 2012 PBS documentary on the Dust Bowl directed by Ken Burns
- Dustbowl (album), a 1988 album by Head of David
- Dust Bowl (album), a 2011 album by Joe Bonamassa
- Dustbowl (band), a Greek country band
- "Dust Bowl", a 2025 song by Ethel Cain from Willoughby Tucker, I'll Always Love You
- "Dust Bowl", a song by 10,000 Maniacs from their 1989 album Blind Man's Zoo
- Dustbowl, a map featured in the video game Team Fortress Classic and its sequel Team Fortress 2
