= The Columbia Years: The Definitive Anthology =

Compilation album by Dave Mason
- Released: 11 March 2016
- Genre: Rock
- Length: 1:55:36
- Label: Columbia
- Producer: Various

Dave Mason chronology
Future's Past (2014)	The Columbia Years: The Definitive Anthology (2016)

The Essential Dave Mason
- 2015 digital-only release

Professional ratings
Review scores
Source	Rating
AllMusic	4.5/5 stars

The Columbia Years: The Definitive Anthology is a compilation by guitarist Dave Mason, released as a double-CD set in 2016. This album is a physical version of Columbia Records’ 2015 digital-only album The Essential Dave Mason.

The Columbia Years: The Definitive Anthology spans from 1973's It's Like You Never Left to 1980's Old Crest on a New Wave, including live cuts from Mason's career.

== Track listing ==
Disc 1
No.	Title	Writer(s)	Length
1.	"Misty Morning Stranger"	Dave Mason	4:31
2.	"Baby…Please"	Dave Mason	3:12
3.	"The Lonely One"	Dave Mason	4:45
4.	"Headkeeper"	Dave Mason	3:38
5.	"It's Like You Never Left"	Dave Mason	2:54
6.	"Every Woman"	Dave Mason	1:39
7.	"All Along the Watchtower"	Bob Dylan	4:03
8.	"You Can't Take It When You Go"	Dave Mason	4:08
9.	"Show Me Some Affection"	Dave Mason	4:18
10.	"Bring It On Home to Me"	Sam Cooke	2:55
11.	"Relation Ships"	Dave Mason	5:02
12.	"You Can Lose It"	Jim Krueger, Dave Mason	3:04
13.	"Split Coconut"	Dave Mason	3:38
14.	"Crying, Waiting, Hoping"	Buddy Holly	2:43
15.	"Long Lost Friend"	Dave Mason	4:26

Disc 2
No.	Title	Writer(s)	Length
1.	"Feelin' Alright [Live]"	Dave Mason	6:23
2.	"Pearly Queen [Live]"	Jim Capaldi, Dave Mason	3:37
3.	"Take It to the Limit [Live]"	Glenn Frey, Don Henley, Randy Meisner	3:30
4.	"Sad and Deep as You [Live]"	Dave Mason	3:08
5.	"Only You Know and I Know [Live]"	Dave Mason	4:20
6.	"We Just Disagree"	Jim Krueger	2:59
7.	"So High (Rock Me Baby and Roll Me Away)"	Jack Conrad, Mentor Williams	4:08
8.	"Then It’s Alright"	Dave Mason	4:14
9.	"Seasons"	Angeleen Gagliano	4:49
10.	"Let It Go, Let It Flow"	Dave Mason	3:16
11.	"Mystic Traveler"	Dave Mason	5:02
12.	"Don’t It Make You Wonder"	Dave Mason, Kathy Nicholas	3:00
13.	"Will You Love Me Tomorrow"	Gerry Goffin, Carole King	5:03
14.	"Save Me"	Jim Krueger	3:36
15.	"Paralyzed"	Stephen Holsapple, Chuck Kavooras, Fred Marrone, Robert Marrone	3:34
