= Live at Rockpalast =

Live at Rockpalast may refer to:

- Live at Rockpalast (Dalbello album)
- Live at Rockpalast (Joe Bonamassa album)
- Live at Rockpalast (Joe Jackson album)
- Live at Rockpalast (John Cale album)
