= Had to Cry Today =

Had to Cry Today may refer to:

- Had to Cry Today (song), a song by Blind Faith
- Had to Cry Today (album), an album by Joe Bonamassa
