= Just Got Paid =

Just Got Paid may refer to:

- "Just Got Paid" (Johnny Kemp song), 1988
- "Just Got Paid" (Sigala song), 2018
- "Just Got Paid", a song written by Billy Gibbons and Bill Ham which was recorded by ZZ Top for their 1972 album Rio Grande Mud
  - The cover of "Just Got Paid", performed by Rapeman on the album Two Nuns and a Pack Mule
  - The cover of "Just Got Paid", performed by Mastodon on the compilation album Covered, A Revolution in Sound
  - The cover of "Just Got Paid", performed by UFO on the album The Salentino Cuts
  - The cover of "Just Got Paid", performed by Joe Bonamassa on the album Tour de Force: Live in London – Royal Albert Hall
  - The cover of "Just Got Paid", performed by Gov't Mule on the album The Tel-Star Sessions

== See also ==
- Just Got Paid, Let's Get Laid, a 2009 EP by the Millionaires
