= Tour de Force: Live in London =

Video by Joe Bonamassa
- Released: October 28, 2013 (video albums); May 19, 2014 (live albums)
- Recorded: March 26 – 30, 2013
- Venue: The Borderline; Shepherd's Bush Empire; Hammersmith Apollo; Royal Albert Hall (London, England)
- Genre: Blues-rock
- Length: 7:16:43 (total): 1:28:32 (The Borderline); 1:41:46 (Shepherd's Bush Empire); 1:56:10 (Hammersmith Apollo); 2:10:15 (Royal Albert Hall)
- Label: Provogue; J&R Adventures
- Director: Philippe Klose
- Producer: Kevin Shirley

Joe Bonamassa video album chronology
An Acoustic Evening at the Vienna Opera House (2013)	Tour de Force: Live in London (2013)	Live in Amsterdam (2014)

Joe Bonamassa live album chronology
Live in Amsterdam (2014)	Tour de Force: Live in London (2014)	Muddy Wolf at Red Rocks (2015)

Tour de Force: Live in London is a series of videos and live albums by American blues-rock musician Joe Bonamassa. Produced by Kevin Shirley and directed by Philippe Klose, the albums document the guitarist and vocalist's four performances at four venues in London, England in March 2013. Each of the four shows were initially released as videos on October 28, 2013 in Europe by Provogue Records, and the following day in North America by J&R Adventures, with a box set featuring all four shows and a special collector's edition hardback book also issued at the same time. All four shows were issued as live albums on May 19, 2014.

During March 2013, Bonamassa performed a series of shows at four venues in London, each of which featured different personnel and themes. On March 26, a three-piece lineup performed a set featuring many of Bonamassa's early songs at The Borderline; on March 27, a larger band including a keyboardist and horn section performed a blues-themed set at Shepherd's Bush Empire; on March 28, another lineup of the group including a percussionist and backing vocalist focused on the rock genre at the Hammersmith Apollo; and on March 30, Bonamassa performed acoustic and electric "greatest hits" sets with two different bands at the Royal Albert Hall.

All four Tour de Force single-show video releases reached the top ten of the US Billboard Music Video Sales chart and the UK Music Video Chart, with the complete collection reaching number 18 in the US. The four live albums all reached the top ten of the Billboard Blues Albums chart and the UK Jazz & Blues Albums Chart, while the Royal Albert Hall release also charted on the Billboard Independent Albums chart (at number 46) and the UK Albums Chart (at number 131). Media response to the albums was generally positive, with commentators praising the ambition of the releases, as well as the variety of set lists and performances across the shows.

== Background and release ==
Billed as "The Guitar Event of the Year", Joe Bonamassa performed four shows in London, England in March 2013 – at The Borderline on March 26, at Shepherd's Bush Empire on March 27, at Hammersmith Apollo on March 28, and at the Royal Albert Hall on March 30. The official press release for the shows explained that they were designed to "chronicle Bonamassa's atmospheric rise from the intimate club environment of The Borderline, to the prestigious Royal Albert Hall", with each date featuring a different band lineup and set list theme to match the according phase of his career – the first would feature a three-piece band performing a "jammy tribute to Bonamassa's earlier career"; the second would be a "blues-themed night" including a horn section designed to create a "soulful, big-blues-band feel"; the third would be a "rock-inspired evening" beginning with a short acoustic set; and the fourth would be a "half acoustic/half electric show" based on Bonamassa's "most popular and well-known songs".

The idea for the four different shows in London was originally conceived by Bonamassa's producer Kevin Shirley and manager Roy Weisman, the latter of whom recalled that he had suggested Bonamassa use the four shows as "an opportunity for him to go back on his entire career and do a lot of songs he'd recorded but never played live",. Bonamassa added that "London is like my second home. With these shows, I wanted to give the fans attending the London 2013 shows a real treat – something special to thank them for their unwavering support." The initial release of Tour de Force: Live in London on October 28, 2013 included four double DVD and Blu-ray sets (one for each show), as well as a collector's edition box set containing all four videos and a hardback book packaged in a box designed to look like a Marshall amplifier.

== Reception ==
=== Commercial ===
All four single-show Tour de Force: Live in London videos debuted in the top ten of the US Billboard Music Video Sales chart, with the Royal Albert Hall release entering at the highest position, number 5. They also reached the top ten of the UK Music Video Chart, with Royal Albert Hall reaching number 4. Elsewhere in Europe, the albums reached the top ten in Belgium, the Netherlands, and Sweden. The Tour de Force: Live in London box set containing all four shows charted at number 18 in the US, number 2 in Austria, number 3 in Switzerland, and number 14 in Germany.

The following year, all four Tour de Force: Live in London albums entered the top ten of the US Billboard Blues Albums chart, with the Royal Albert Hall release reaching number 4. They also all reached the top ten of the UK Jazz & Blues Albums Chart, with the Royal Albert Hall album peaking at number 3. Royal Albert Hall also reached number 131 on the UK Albums Chart. Three of the four releases also charted in Belgium, two of the four charted in the Netherlands, The Borderline album charted in France, and the Royal Albert Hall album also charted in Austria and Switzerland.

=== Critical ===
Professional ratings
Review scores
Source	Rating
AllMusic	3.5/5 stars
Blues	8/10 stars
Blues Matters!	Favorable
Classic Rock	8/10 stars
Premier Guitar	4/5 stars
Total Guitar	4/5 stars

Media response to Tour de Force: Live in London was positive. Classic Rock and its sister publication Blues each presented Tour de Force: Live in London with ratings of eight out of ten, with Hugh Fielder for the former praising the breadth of material available on the set. For Blues, Henry Yates proposed that "we can't remember the last time a live blues event caught the imagination quite like Joe Bonamassa's four-night stand", praising elements of the videos' production (including "stellar camerawork and pin-sharp sound"), the extra content included on the releases (which he described as "a healthy dollop of bonus material"), and the performances themselves (he concludes his review by saying that "Tour de Force is a brilliantly executed document of a truly memorable concert run, and comes highly recommended").

In a review of the set for Blues Matters!, Pete Sargeant praised the performances of various members of Bonamassa's backing bands at the shows, noting that "The players are fantastic throughout the shows, especially the drummers and percussionists", although concluded by praising the frontman's vocal performances as the main highlight. Total Guitar magazine awarded the video albums four out of five stars, with reviewer Chris Vinnicombe praising the set for "showcasing an artist right at the top of his game in terms of both musical ability and business savvy". Premier Guitar magazine writer Corbin Reiff outlined that "Overall it's a triumph. You really have to marvel at Bonamassa's gumption, and moreso, his sheer will and determination to pull it off." AllMusic's Steve Leggett reviewed the Royal Albert Hall release of the set positively, explaining that "Bonamassa has soul, plenty of it, and he plays guitar with a reverent grace ... the guitarist and singer [is] in fine form in both settings".

== Track listings ==
=== The Borderline ===
Disc one
No.	Title	Writer(s)	Length
1.	"Albion" (intro)	Kevin Shirley; Jeff Bova	2:14
2.	"I Know Where I Belong"	Joe Bonamassa	5:46
3.	"Spanish Boots"	Jeff Beck; Rod Stewart; Ronnie Wood	4:10
4.	"Your Funeral My Trial" (Sonny Boy Williamson II cover)	Sonny Boy Williamson II	3:41
5.	"Blues Deluxe"	Beck; Stewart	8:38
6.	"Pain and Sorrow"	Bonamassa; Richard Feldman; Eric Pressly	7:54
7.	"Happier Times"	Bonamassa	7:53
8.	"Steal Your Heart Away"	Bobby Parker	3:42
9.	"Miss You, Hate You"	Bonamassa	7:57
Total length:			51:55

Disc two
No.	Title	Writer(s)	Length
1.	"The River"	Bonamassa; Bob Held	6:57
2.	"Burning Hell"	John Lee Hooker; Bernard Besman	7:07
3.	"Don't Burn Down That Bridge"	Allen Jones; Carl Wells	10:40
4.	"Story of a Quarryman"	Bonamassa	4:53
5.	"Are You Experienced?" (The Jimi Hendrix Experience cover)	Jimi Hendrix	7:00
Total length:			36:37

Bonus features on the video release:

- "No Man's Land: An Exclusive Look Behind the Scenes – Part One"
- "The Making of Tour de Force – Part One"
- "All Access Pass: The Borderline – Live in London Photo Collection"

=== Shepherd's Bush Empire ===
Disc one
No.	Title	Writer(s)	Length
1.	"Albion" (intro)	Shirley; Bova	2:14
2.	"Slow Train"	Bonamassa; Shirley	6:45
3.	"So, It's Like That"	Bonamassa; Mike Himelstein	3:26
4.	"Midnight Blues" (Gary Moore cover)	Gary Moore	8:38
5.	"Last Kiss"	Bonamassa	7:40
6.	"So Many Roads" (Otis Rush cover)	Paul Marshall	6:25
7.	"You Better Watch Yourself" (Little Walter cover)	Walter Jacobs; Bonamassa	5:04
8.	"Chains and Things" (B.B. King cover)	B.B. King; Dave Clark	7:36
Total length:			47:48

Disc two
No.	Title	Writer(s)	Length
1.	"Lonesome Road Blues"	Bonamassa	4:54
2.	"Stop!"	Sam Brown; Gregg Sutton; Bruce Brody	6:37
3.	"I Got All You Need"	Willie Dixon	3:07
4.	"The Great Flood"	Bonamassa	10:17
5.	"The Ballad of John Henry"	Bonamassa	13:23
6.	"Asking Around for You"	Bonamassa; Himelstein	10:39
7.	"Further On Up the Road" (Bobby "Blue" Bland cover)	Don Robey; Joe Veasey	5:01
Total length:			53:58

Bonus features on the video release:

- "No Man's Land: An Exclusive Look Behind the Scenes – Part Two"
- "The Making of Tour de Force – Part Two"
- "All Access Pass: Shepherd's Bush Empire – Live in London Photo Collection"

=== Hammersmith Apollo ===
Disc one
No.	Title	Writer(s)	Length
1.	"Albion" (intro)	Shirley; Bova	2:14
2.	"Seagull"	Paul Rodgers; Mick Ralphs	4:33
3.	"Jelly Roll"	John Martyn	2:53
4.	"Richmond"	Bonamassa; Himelstein	4:49
5.	"Athens to Athens"	Bonamassa	4:51
6.	"Woke Up Dreaming"	Bonamassa; Jennings	4:09
7.	"Cradle Rock"	Rory Gallagher	4:58
8.	"When the Fire Hits the Sea"	Bonamassa	3:47
9.	"Dust Bowl"	Bonamassa	7:09
10.	"Dislocated Boy"	Bonamassa	9:52
11.	"Driving Towards the Daylight"	Bonamassa; Danny Kortchmar	6:22
Total length:			55:37

Disc two
No.	Title	Writer(s)	Length
1.	"Who's Been Talking"	Chester Arthur Burnett	5:45
2.	"Jockey Full of Bourbon"	Tom Waits	5:29
3.	"Tea for One"	Jimmy Page; Robert Plant	9:43
4.	"Lonesome Road Blues"	Bonamassa	4:57
5.	"The Ballad of John Henry"	Bonamassa	13:16
6.	"Sloe Gin"	Bob Ezrin; Michael Kamen	8:59
7.	"Just Got Paid" (ZZ Top cover)	Billy Gibbons; Bill Ham	12:25
Total length:			60:34

Bonus features on the video release:

- "No Man's Land: An Exclusive Look Behind the Scenes – Part Three"
- "The Making of Tour de Force – Part Three"
- "All Access Pass: Hammersmith Apollo – Live in London Photo Collection"

=== Royal Albert Hall ===
Disc one
No.	Title	Writer(s)	Length
1.	"Albion" (intro)	Shirley; Bova	2:14
2.	"Palm Trees, Helicopters and Gasoline"	Bonamassa	1:51
3.	"Seagull"	Rodgers; Ralphs	5:39
4.	"Jelly Roll"	Martyn	2:39
5.	"Black Lung Heartache"	Bonamassa	4:03
6.	"Around the Bend"	Bonamassa; Jennings	6:04
7.	"Jockey Full of Bourbon"	Waits	5:25
8.	"From the Valley"	Bonamassa	2:31
9.	"Athens to Athens"	Bonamassa	6:18
10.	"Slow Train"	Bonamassa; Shirley	6:32
11.	"Last Kiss"	Bonamassa	7:17
12.	"Dust Bowl"	Bonamassa	7:12
13.	"Midnight Blues" (Gary Moore cover)	Moore	8:19
Total length:			66:04

Disc two
No.	Title	Writer(s)	Length
1.	"Who's Been Talking"	Burnett	5:49
2.	"Happier Times"	Bonamassa	6:29
3.	"Driving Towards the Daylight"	Bonamassa; Kortchmar	6:22
4.	"The Ballad of John Henry"	Bonamassa	13:13
5.	"Django/Mountain Time"	Bonamassa; Jennings	11:43
6.	"Sloe Gin"	Ezrin; Kamen	8:24
7.	"Just Got Paid" (ZZ Top cover)	Gibbons; Ham	12:11
Total length:			64:11

Bonus features on the video release:

- "No Man's Land: An Exclusive Look Behind the Scenes – Part Four"
- "The Making of Tour de Force – Part Four"
- "All Access Pass: Royal Albert Hall – Live in London Photo Collection"

== Personnel ==
- Joe Bonamassa – guitar, vocals
- Carmine Rojas – bass (Shepherd's Bush Empire, Hammersmith Apollo and Royal Albert Hall)
- Michael Rhodes – bass (The Borderline and Royal Albert Hall)
- Tal Bergman – drums (Shepherd's Bush Empire, Hammersmith Apollo and Royal Albert Hall)
- Anton Fig – drums (The Borderline and Royal Albert Hall)
- Arlan Schierbaum – keyboards (Shepherd's Bush Empire, Hammersmith Apollo and Royal Albert Hall)
- Lenny Castro – percussion (Hammersmith Apollo and Royal Albert Hall)
- Doug Henthorn – backing vocals (Hammersmith Apollo and Royal Albert Hall)
- Lee Thornburg – trumpet, horn arrangements (Shepherd's Bush Empire)
- Mike Feltham – trombone (Shepherd's Bush Empire)
- Sean Freeman – saxophone (Shepherd's Bush Empire)
- Gerry O'Connor – banjo, fiddle, mandolin (Royal Albert Hall)
- Mats Wester – nyckelharpa (Royal Albert Hall)
- Kevin Shirley – production, mixing, mastering
- Philippe Klose – direction
- Marcus Bird – photography and direction
- Jared Kvitka – engineering
- Gavin Lurssen – mastering
- Dennis Friel – package design
- Christie Goodwin – photography

== Chart positions ==
=== Video charts ===
The Borderline

Chart (2013)	Peak position
Belgian Albums (Ultratop Flanders)	10
Belgian Albums (Ultratop Wallonia)	8
Dutch Albums (MegaCharts)	7
Swedish Music Videos (Sverigetopplistan)	8
UK Music Videos (OCC)	8
US Music Video Sales (Billboard)	8

Shepherd's Bush Empire

Chart (2013)	Peak position
Belgian Albums (Ultratop Wallonia)	10
Dutch Albums (MegaCharts)	11
Swedish Music Videos (Sverigetopplistan)	7
UK Music Videos (OCC)	9
US Music Video Sales (Billboard)	9

Hammersmith Apollo

Chart (2013)	Peak position
Belgian Albums (Ultratop Wallonia)	10
Dutch Albums (MegaCharts)	10
Swedish Music Videos (Sverigetopplistan)	6
UK Music Videos (OCC)	6
US Music Video Sales (Billboard)	6

Royal Albert Hall

Chart (2013)	Peak position
Belgian Albums (Ultratop Flanders)	9
Belgian Albums (Ultratop Wallonia)	4
Dutch Albums (MegaCharts)	8
Swedish Music Videos (Sverigetopplistan)	5
UK Music Videos (OCC)	4
US Music Video Sales (Billboard)	5

Live in London

Chart (2013)	Peak position
Austrian Music Videos (Ö3 Austria)	2
German Music Videos (Offizielle Top 100)	14
Swiss Music Videos (Schweizer Hitparade)	3
US Music Video Sales (Billboard)	18

=== Album charts ===
The Borderline

Chart (2014)	Peak position
French Albums (SNEP)	103
UK Jazz & Blues Albums (OCC)	9
US Blues Albums (Billboard)	5

Shepherd's Bush Empire

Chart (2014)	Peak position
Belgian Albums (Ultratop Flanders)	171
Belgian Albums (Ultratop Wallonia)	151
UK Jazz & Blues Albums (OCC)	7
US Blues Albums (Billboard)	7

Hammersmith Apollo

Chart (2014)	Peak position
Belgian Albums (Ultratop Flanders)	169
Dutch Albums (MegaCharts)	73
UK Jazz & Blues Albums (OCC)	8
US Blues Albums (Billboard)	6

Royal Albert Hall

Chart (2014)	Peak position
Austrian Albums (Ö3 Austria)	28
Belgian Albums (Ultratop Flanders)	170
Belgian Albums (Ultratop Wallonia)	120
Dutch Albums (MegaCharts)	89
Swiss Albums (Schweizer Hitparade)	28
UK Albums (OCC)	131
UK Jazz & Blues Albums (OCC)	3
UK Physical Albums (OCC)	81
US Blues Albums (Billboard)	4
US Independent Albums (Billboard)	46
