= Black Rock (Joe Bonamassa album) =

Studio album by Joe Bonamassa
- Released: March 23, 2010
- Studio: Black Rock (Santorini, Greece)
- Genre: Blues rock
- Length: 52:51
- Label: J&R Adventures
- Producer: Kevin Shirley

Joe Bonamassa chronology
Live from the Royal Albert Hall (2009)	Black Rock (2010)	Dust Bowl (2011)

Professional ratings
Review scores
Source	Rating
AllMusic	4/5 stars
Classic Rock	8/10 stars

Black Rock is an album by the American blues rock guitarist Joe Bonamassa. It was recorded at Black Rock Studios in the Greek island of Santorini and it was released worldwide on March 23, 2010.

Track 8, "Night Life", features a duet between Bonamassa and his childhood hero B. B. King.

== Track listing ==
No.	Title	Writer(s)	Length
1.	"Steal Your Heart Away" (Bobby Parker cover)	Bobby Parker	3:48
2.	"I Know a Place" (John Hiatt cover)	John Hiatt	4:19
3.	"When the Fire Hits the Sea"	Joe Bonamassa	3:55
4.	"Quarryman's Lament"	Joe Bonamassa	5:22
5.	"Spanish Boots" (Jeff Beck cover)	Jeff Beck, Rod Stewart, Ronnie Wood	4:38
6.	"Bird on a Wire" (Leonard Cohen cover)	Leonard Cohen	5:21
7.	"Three Times a Fool" (Otis Rush cover)	Otis Rush	2:02
8.	"Night Life" (ft. B. B. King; Willie Nelson cover)	Walt Breeland, Paul Buskirk, Willie Nelson	3:26
9.	"Wandering Earth"	Joe Bonamassa	4:19
10.	"Look Over Yonder's Wall" (Freddie King cover)	James Clark	3:27
11.	"Athens to Athens"	Joe Bonamassa	2:26
12.	"Blue and Evil"	Joe Bonamassa	5:44
13.	"Baby You Gotta Change Your Mind" (Blind Boy Fuller cover)	Blind Boy Fuller	4:25
Total length:			52:51

== Personnel ==
- Joe Bonamassa – guitars, vocals
- Rick Melick – keyboards
- Carmine Rojas – bass
- Bogie Bowles – drums
- Anton Fig – drums
- Thanasis Vasilopoulos – clarinet
- David Woodford – saxophone
- Manolis Karadinis – bouzouki
- Lee Thornburg – brass, brass arrangements

Guest artist

- B.B. King – guitars, vocals

== Chart performance ==
Chart (2010)	Peak position
Austrian Albums (Ö3 Austria)	49
Belgian Albums (Ultratop Flanders)	98
Dutch Albums (Album Top 100)	28
French Albums (SNEP)	108
German Albums (Offizielle Top 100)	22
Norwegian Albums (VG-lista)	40
Scottish Albums (OCC)	16
Swiss Albums (Schweizer Hitparade)	60
Swedish Albums (Sverigetopplistan)	24
UK Albums (OCC)	14
UK Album Downloads (OCC)	27
UK Jazz & Blues Albums (OCC)	1
UK Independent Albums (OCC)	1
US Billboard 200	39
US Independent Albums (Billboard)	3
US Top Rock Albums (Billboard)	7
US Top Blues Albums (Billboard)	1
US Top Tastemaker Albums (Billboard)	39
