= (In) Exile =

[In] Exile

Studio album by After the Fall
- Released: 28 August 2009
- Recorded: 2008–2009 at Gumstead, Sing Sing Studios, Pete's Ranch, 301 and Paradise.
- Genre: Pop rock Alternative rock
- Length: 44:42
- Label: Roadrunner
- Producer: Richard Stolz

After the Fall chronology
Always Forever Now (2005)	[In] Exile (2009)

Professional ratings
Review scores
Source	Rating
Kill Your Stereo	(68/100)
X-Press magazine	(unfavourable)

[In] Exile is the third full-length studio album by Australian rock band After the Fall, released through Roadrunner Records on 28 August 2009. The album was produced, engineered and mixed by Richard Stolz.

In 2008, the band gave fans the opportunity to hear numerous demos from the album through their MySpace blog whilst they were recording. After previously releasing their albums through major record labels, the band decided to release independently. They moved from Festival Mushroom to release their first album on Roadrunner Records (Australia). It was recorded at multiple locations, including a country house in Victoria, Gumstead, Sing Sing Studios, Pete's Ranch, 301 and Paradise. "Break Me" was the first song released, made available through the band's website for free download in 2008. The band opted to not release the song through traditional methods. The first single from the album was "Digital Age", which was released to the iTunes Store on 12 June 2009. A limited edition was released through JB Hi-Fi featuring two bonus tracks: "All Together Now" and "Home".

The band played two shows prior to the album's release in July 2009, one each in Melbourne and Sydney. They are scheduled to undertake a national tour alongside Calling All Cars in support of the album.

== Track listing ==
1. "Digital Age" – 3:05
2. "Scotland Yard" – 3:00
3. "Desire" – 3:16
4. "Break Me" – 2:53
5. "In the End" – 3:31
6. "Born" – 3:21
7. "A Feather Afloat" – 3:51
8. "The Big Exit" – 4:29
9. "Lullaby" – 3:42
10. "Pressure" – 3:34
11. "1969" – 3:43

=== Bonus tracks ===
1. "All Together Now" – 3:09
2. "Home" – 3:14

== Personnel ==
Band

- Benjamin Windsor – Vocals
- Andrew Atkins – Drums
- Matthew Gore – bass
- Mark Edward Warner – guitar

Production

- Richard Stolz – Producer, engineering, mixing
- Matt Maddock – Additional engineering
- John Ruberto – Mixing
- Selina Stringfellow – String arrangements
- Somersby Community Recital Group – String performances
- Trent David Crawford – Extra guitar on "1969" and "Lullaby"
- Shane Wakker, Justin Bamford – Additional percussion
- Tim Manton – Management
- Booking Agent – Brett Murrihy

Design

- Mathematics – Design and art direction
- Angelo Kehagias – band photography
