= Retarder (album) =

Studio album by The Unband
- Released: July 2000
- Recorded: November 1997 and March 2000
- Genre: Hard rock, rock
- Label: TVT Records
- Producer: The Unband

The Unband chronology
Chung Wayne Lo Mein (1994)	Retarder (2000)

Professional ratings
Review scores
Source	Rating
Allmusic	link
Rolling Stone	link

Retarder is The Unband's first major label release.

== Track listing ==
1. Geez Louise 3:24
2. Too Much Is Never Enough 2:35
3. Rock Hard 3:41
4. Jilt 3:00
5. Ski Hat 2:09
6. $#@?!! 2:14
7. Pink Slip 3:00
8. Crack Soundtrack 3:44
9. Everybody Wants You 4:09
10. Get With You 2:54
11. (Sure Do Feel Like A) Piece of Shit 3:06
12. Dope, Pt. 2 2:42
13. Cocaine Whore 2:43
14. Drink and Rock 3:28

== Credits ==
- Eugene Ferrari – drums
- Matt Pierce – guitar, vocals
- Mike Ruffino – bass, piano, organ, guitar, background vocals
- Mark Alan Miller – engineer
- Jon Marshall Smith – engineer
- Kevin Shirley – mixing
- Rich Alvy – engineer, mixing engineer
- Leon Zervos – mastering
- Leonard B. Johnson - A&R

== Trivia ==
"Geez Louise" was featured on The Wildhearts' covers album Stop Us If You've Heard This One Before Vol 1. as well as on the 2001 soundtrack to Broken Lizard's Super Troopers.
