= The Ballad of John Henry (album) =

2009 studio album by Joe Bonamassa

Studio album by Joe Bonamassa
- Released: February 24, 2009
- Genre: Blues rock
- Length: 64:23
- Labels: J&R Adventures
- Producer: Kevin Shirley

Joe Bonamassa chronology
Live from Nowhere in Particular (2008)	The Ballad of John Henry (2009)	Live from the Royal Albert Hall (2009)

The Ballad of John Henry is the seventh studio album by the American blues rock musician Joe Bonamassa. Produced by Kevin Shirley, it was released on 24 February 2009 by J&R Adventures and topped the US Billboard Top Blues Albums chart.

== Reception ==
Professional ratings
Review scores
Source	Rating
Allmusic	4/5 stars
PopMatters	(7/10)

The music website Allmusic gave The Ballad of John Henry four out of five stars, with its reviewer Stephen Thomas Erlewine claiming that "everything that [Bonamassa]'s dabbled with on previous albums is pulled together here, making for his most varied album and possibly his best, even if that heaviness means that it's not necessarily the easiest to enjoy".

== Track listing ==
No.	Title	Writer(s)	Length
1.	"The Ballad of John Henry"	Joe Bonamassa, Mississippi John Hurt	6:26
2.	"Stop!" (Sam Brown cover)	Sam Brown, Gregg Sutton, Bruce Brody	6:48
3.	"Last Kiss"	Bonamassa	7:15
4.	"Jockey Full of Bourbon" (Tom Waits cover)	Tom Waits	5:22
5.	"Story of a Quarryman"	Bonamassa	4:59
6.	"Lonesome Road Blues"	Bonamassa	3:08
7.	"Happier Times"	Bonamassa	6:40
8.	"Feelin' Good" (Cy Grant cover)	Leslie Bricusse, Anthony Newley	4:44
9.	"Funkier Than a Mosquito's Tweeter" (Ike & Tina Turner cover)	Aillene Bullock	5:00
10.	"The Great Flood"	Bonamassa	7:39
11.	"From the Valley"	Bonamassa	2:24
12.	"As the Crow Flies" (Tony Joe White cover)	Tony Joe White, Tennessee Swamp Fox	3:58
Total length:			64:23

== Personnel ==
Musical performers

- Joe Bonamassa – guitars, vocals, liner notes
- Rick Melick – keyboards, backing vocals
- Blondie Chaplin – rhythm guitar
- Carmine Rojas – bass guitar
- Anton Fig – drums
- Bogie Bowles – drums
- Lee Thornburg – brass instruments, brass arrangements
- David Woodford – saxophone

Production personnel

- Kevin Shirley – production, mixing
- Jared Kvitka – engineering

Additional personnel

- Rob Shanahan – photography
- Dennis Friel – art direction, graphic design, illustrations
- Josh Smith – graphic design assistance
- Marcus Bird – photography and direction

== Chart performance ==
Chart (2009)	Peak
US Billboard 200	103
US Billboard Top Blues Albums	1
US Billboard Independent Albums	8
Dutch Albums Chart	23
Swedish Albums Chart	46
Swiss Albums Chart	97
UK Albums Chart	26

== Certifications ==
Region	Certification	Certified units/sales
United Kingdom (BPI)	Silver	60,000^{‡}
^{‡} Sales+streaming figures based on certification alone.
