= Steve Louw =

South African musician (born 1955)

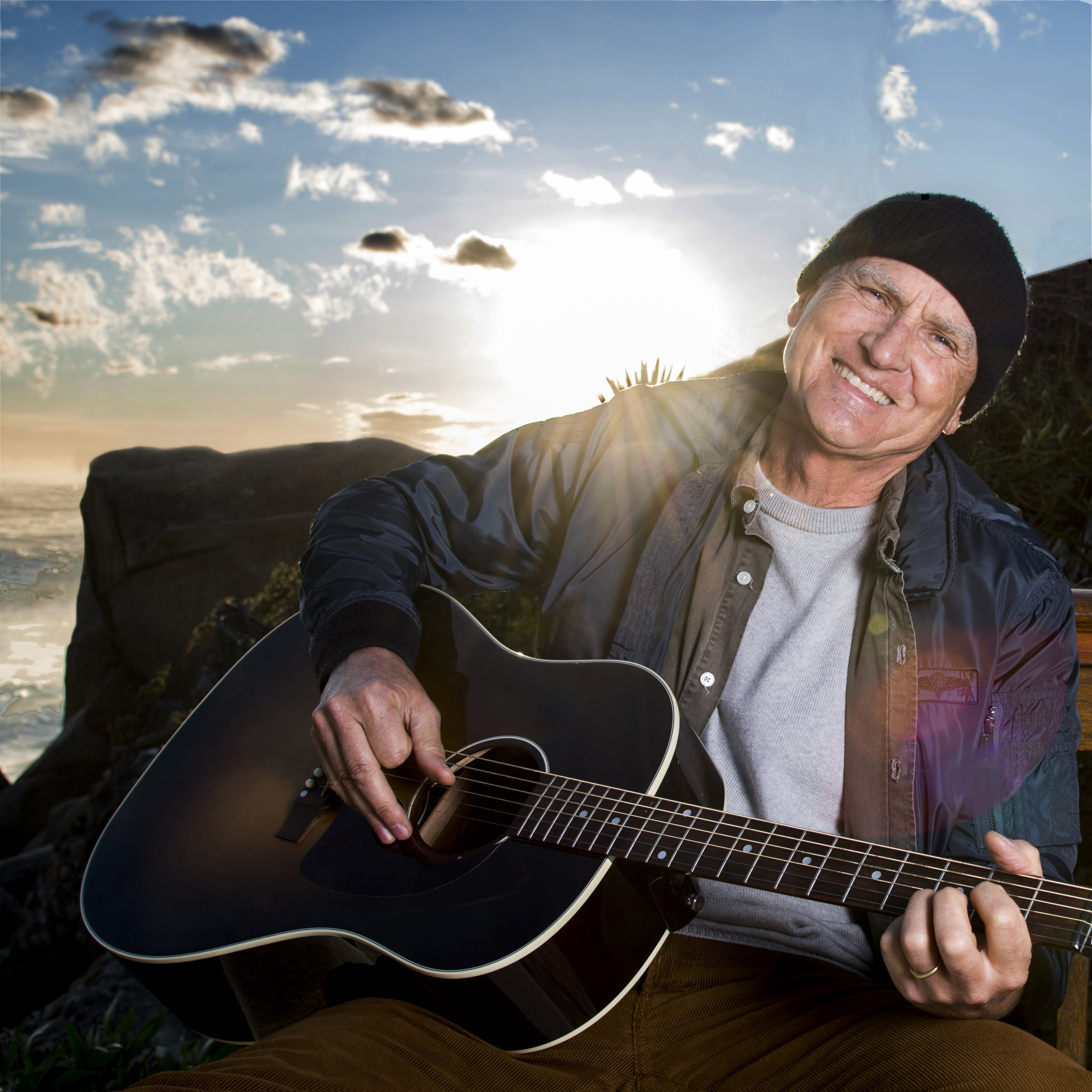
- Louw in 2020
- Born: 16 September 1955 (age 71); The Hague
- Occupation: Musician
- Years active: 1981–present
- Style: Album rock, country rock, blues rock, Americana
- Website: https://stevelouw.com

Steve Louw (born 16 September 1955) is a South African musician and singer-songwriter who specialises in album rock, blues rock, country rock and Americana music. He was born in The Hague and has been active as a musician since 1981. He was inducted in the South African Rock Hall of Fame in 2003.

== Life and career ==
Louw, who was born Stephen Geoffrey Louw, learnt to play the guitar after being inspired by the music of Bob Dylan, the Rolling Stones and Neil Young, and formed his first band, Atlantic Rose, while in high school in Cape Town in the late 1960s. While a student at Stellenbosch University in the 1970s he became involved in the local music scene, playing his own songs in various line-ups.

His career as a professional musician began in the early 1980s when he formed the band All Night Radio with fellow former Stellenbosch University students Nico Burger (guitar) and Rob Nagel (bass). The group recorded two albums – The Heart's the Best Part (1984) with US producer John Rollo, and The Killing Floor (1986), on which Louw began a partnership with producer Kevin Shirley that still continues.

Louw then formed the band Big Sky and in 1990 released their debut album, Waiting for the Dawn, again produced by Shirley. The album arrived just as South Africa began moving away from apartheid rule and the group's music helped soundtrack a decade of positive revolution. The title track is today considered a South African rock classic. Big Sky released another five albums over the next 15 years: Horizon (1995), Going Down with Mr Green (1997), Best of the Decade (1999), Beyond the Blue (2002) and Trancas Canyon (2008); as well as the concert DVD Heart and Soul, filmed at Cape Town's Little Theatre in 2008.

Louw and Big Sky achieved considerable success in South Africa with sell-out tours and several major radio hits including "Kathleen", "Mr Green", "One Cut With a Knife", "Strange Room" and "Diamonds and Dirt", and in 1996 the band won the FNB South African Music Award for Best Pop Music Performance, Best Rock Album for the album "Horizon".

In 1998 Big Sky opened for US singer-songwriter Rodriguez on his triumphant debut tour of South Africa, with the musicians in the band also backing the US artist. The tour is chronicled in the 2012 Oscar-winning documentary Searching for Sugar Man.

Louw gained an international profile after he collaborated with Brian May (Queen) and Dave Stewart (the Eurythmics) on the track "Amandla", recorded for the 46664 Aids awareness project inspired by the work of Nelson Mandela.

In 2021 Louw returned with the album "Headlight Dreams", produced by Shirley and recorded in Nashville with crack studio musicians and featuring a guest appearance by US guitar legend Joe Bonamassa. The album received critical acclaim and the first single, "Wind in Your Hair", become a Spotify hit.

In September 2022 Louw announced his sophomore solo release "Thunder and Rain", available November 11, 2022 through BFD. The album was produced by Kevin Shirley and features Joe Bonamassa and Doug Lancio.

On September 6, 2024, Louw released his third solo album Between Time, produced by Kevin Shirley.

On May 15, 2026, Louw released his fourth solo album Traces Of The Flood, produced by Kevin Shirley.

== Discography ==
=== Albums ===
- The Heart's The Best Part (1984) All Night Radio
- The Killing Floor (1986) All Night Radio
- Waiting For The Dawn (1990) Big Sky
- Horizon (1995) Big Sky
- Going Down With Mr Green (1997) Big Sky
- Best Of The Decade (1999) Big Sky
- Beyond The Blue (2002) Big Sky
- Trancas Canyon (2008) Big Sky
- Headlight Dreams (2021)
- Thunder And Rain (2022)
- Between Time (2024)
- Traces Of The Flood (2026)

== Personal life ==
Louw married Erna Pienaar in 1988 and has three children.

== Sources ==
- https://sarockmusic.com/south-africas-rock-family-trees/steve-louw-family-tree/
- http://sarockdigest.com/archives/issue_113.html
