= The Barnestormers =

Studio album by the Barnestormers
- Released: 26 May 2023
- Label: Bloodlines

Singles from The Barnestormers
- 1. "Johnny's Gone" Released: 10 March 2023; 2. "Real Wild Child" Released: 21 April 2023

The Barnestormers is the debut studio album by international supergroup of the same name. The album was released on 26 May 2023.

== Background ==
In January 2021, Jimmy Barnes announced he had formed a rockabilly outfit with Chris Cheney of The Living End and Slim Jim Phantom of Stray Cats. Barnes said "Slim Jim and I have been talking about doing this for 20 years. We've got three quarters of a rockabilly album finished, half originals, half old covers." The musicians laid down their parts separately in isolation, across three continents, before Shirley put it together.

In February 2023, Barnes revealed more of the outfit's existence on the first episode of the new season of RocKwiz .The group, called The Barnestormers, features Jimmy Barnes on vocals, Chris Cheney on guitar, Slim Jim Phantom on drums, Thomas Lorioux (Frantic Flintstones/Guitar Slingers) on Upright Bass, Kevin Shirley on bass, and Jools Holland on piano.

The group's debut single, a cover of Don Walker's "Johnny's Gone" was released 10 March 2023, alongside the album pre-order. The song's video clip features the comic book artwork of Vince Ray brought to cartoon life by Marco Pavone.

A cover of Johnny O'Keefe "Real Wild Child" was released on 21 April 2023 as the album's second single. Mary Varvaris from The Music said "The joyful, rock 'n' roll cover is perfect for The Barnestormers - every band member has a bit of rockabilly in them, and their take on 'Real Wild Child' solidifies the passion behind this project."

== Critical reception ==
Professional ratings
Review scores
Source	Rating
Newcastle Herald	3/5 stars

Josh Leeson from Newcastle Herald said "Holland's boogie woogie piano-playing on 'Lonesome Train' is a scintillating highlight and Barnes sounds inspired throughout by his accomplished bandmates. The Barnestormers are having a blast and if they can ever get the band together for a tour, it'll be one hell of a party-starter."

Ellie Robinson from NME said "While its the Cold Chisel frontman's soulful tenor that piques curiosity at first, that's just one piece of a much more complex and dynamic puzzle: Cheney's rollicking riffs gel wonderfully with Shirley's groovy low-end, while Holland adds some brightness and flare on the piano. This is '50s jukebox jamming at it's [sic] rockin' and rollin' best."

Jeff Jenkins from Stack Magazine said "The Barnestormers' self-titled debut is a success from start to finish because the aim is simple: having fun. They've delivered a riotous rockabilly rave-up, with songs celebrating the origins of rock 'n' roll." Jenkins concluded the review saying "The Barnestormers is one of 2023's great party records."

== Track listing ==
The Barnestormers track listing
No.	Title	Writer(s)	Length
1.	"Sweet Love On My Mind"	Wayne Walker; Webb Pierce	3:00
2.	"Working for the Man"	Roy Orbison	3:07
3.	"Johnny's Gone"	Don Walker	3:44
4.	"Lonesome Train"	Bradley; Moore; Sabofsky	2:35
5.	"Thirteen Women (And Only One Man)"	Dickie Thompson	3:10
6.	"Dear Dad"	Jack Fishman; Joe Henderson	2:14
7.	"Crazy Crazy Lovin'"	Johnny Carroll	2:57
8.	"Sweet Nothin's"	Ronnie Self	2:27
9.	"Land of Hope and Glory"	Walker; Barnes	3:54
10.	"Real Wild Child"	Dave Owens; Johnny Greenan; Johnny O'Keefe	2:38
11.	"25 to Life"	Cheney	3:30

== Charts ==
Chart performance for The Barnestormers
Chart (2023)	Peak position
Australian Albums (ARIA)	3
Swiss Albums (Schweizer Hitparade)	57
