= A New Day Yesterday Live =

Live album by Joe Bonamassa
- Released: 2002
- Recorded: December 21, 2001 in Fort Wayne, Indiana
- Genre: Blues rock
- Length: 70:57
- Label: Premier Artists
- Producer: David Brinker, David Fritz, Roy Weisman

Joe Bonamassa chronology
So, It's Like That (2002)	A New Day Yesterday Live (2002)	Blues Deluxe (2003)

A New Day Yesterday Live is the first live album by American blues rock musician Joe Bonamassa. Recorded in December 2001 during the promotional tour for Bonamassa's debut album A New Day Yesterday, it was released in 2002 by Premier Artists.

== Reception ==
Professional ratings
Review scores
Source	Rating
AllMusic	3.5/5 stars
Guitar World	4/5 stars
Lords of Metal	89/100

Music website AllMusic gave A New Day Yesterday Live 3.5 out of five stars, with reviewer Eduardo Rivadavia praising the album but noting it as an unnecessary release given the studio album came out only a few months earlier. Guitar Nine Records reports that Guitar Magazine Guitar World gave the album a four-star review, describing it as "one funky good time". Richard Verbrugge of the website Lords of Metal was equally positive about the album, claiming that it "shows [Bonamassa] belongs at the top of the blues rock genre".

== Track listing ==
No.	Title	Writer(s)	Length
1.	"Jam Intro"	Joe Bonamassa	3:21
2.	"Cradle Rock"	Rory Gallagher	3:37
3.	"Steppin' Out/Rice Pudding"	Hopkins, Wood, Beck, Newman	5:31
4.	"A New Day Yesterday"	Ian Anderson	8:05
5.	"Miss You, Hate You"	Bonamassa, Richard Feldman	7:20
6.	"Walk in My Shadows"	Paul Rodgers, Paul Kossoff, Andy Fraser, Simon Kirke	5:57
7.	"I Know Where I Belong"	Bonamassa	10:14
8.	"Colour and Shape"	Bonamassa	6:12
9.	"Trouble Waiting"	Bonamassa, Steve Tyrell, Stephanie Tyrell	4:36
10.	"If Heartaches Were Nickels"	Warren Haynes	7:42
11.	"Don't Burn Down That Bridge"	Allen Jones, Carl Wells	8:22

== Personnel ==
Musical performers

- Joe Bonamassa – guitar, vocals
- Eric Czar – bass
- Kenny Kramme – drums

Production personnel

- David Brinker – production
- David Fritz – production
- Roy Weisman – production
- Diane Gentile – production assistance

Additional personnel

- Josh Engelhardt – engineering
- Drew Lavyne – engineering
- William Putt – engineering
- Joe Blaney – mixing
