= The Unband =

American hard rock band

- Origin: Newton, Massachusetts, U.S.
- Genres: Hard rock, punk rock, heavy metal
- Members: Eugene Ferrari, Matt Pierce, Michael Ruffino
- Past members: Mink Rockmoore www.minkrockmoore.org
- Website: theunband.com; myspace.com/theunband

The Unband is an American hard rock band composed of drummer Eugene Ferrari, lead singer and guitarist Matthew Pierce, and bass guitarist Michael Ruffino.

== Formation and personnel ==
Pierce and Ruffino began playing together under various names in suburban Boston in late 1987. Mink Rockmoore joined The Unband in 1990 as its lead guitarist, but left a year later.

== Career ==
From suburban Boston the band relocated to Western Massachusetts, where Pierce and Ferrari attended the University of Massachusetts, and played around the Five College area. Rockmoore remained in Boston but continued to play with the band intermittently, though he does not appear on recordings after 1991. In 1993, the band recorded Chung Wayne Lo Mein, engineered and co-produced by Peter Keppler (Philip Glass, David Bowie), and released on Chunk Records in January 1994.

At Northampton’s Bay State Hotel in 1994, headlining the launch party for the Boston zine Mommy And I Are One, the Northampton Police shut down the show due to on-stage nudity. The Unband were cited and received a court summons for "open and gross lewdness." The band was permanently banned from performing at the venue, though they continued to do so under different names.

After moving briefly to Los Angeles and New York City before returning to Massachusetts, the band signed with New York City-based Indie label Royalty Records (now defunct) in early 1998 and recorded tracks at Slaughterhouse Studios in Hadley, Massachusetts with Mark Alan Miller (Dinosaur Jr., Pernice Brothers) and Jon Marshall Smith (Joey Ramone, Murphy's Law), for an album to be called Retarder (after a type of sound baffling used in the studio). When the band delivered the album and its cover artwork several weeks later, Royalty refused to release the album with its band-designed cover art, and agreed to sell the master tapes back to the band. The band later signed to TVT Records and the album was remixed at Avatar Studios by Kevin Shirley (Iron Maiden, Rush), who also produced two additional tracks, "Too Much Is Never Enough" and "We Like To Drink And We Like To Play Rock And Roll". The band began touring in North America and Europe with bands including Motörhead, Nashville Pussy, The Headstones, The Black Halos, Chevelle, and California stoner rock band Fu Manchu, as well as with the heavy metal bands Dokken, Great White, Sebastian Bach, Dio, Anthrax, and Def Leppard. Retarder was released on TVT in 2000.

The Unband's cover version of Billy Squier's "Everybody Wants You" is featured in Scary Movie (2000), while "Geez Louise" and "Pink Slip" are in Super Troopers (2001).

== Recent ==
In July 2004, Michael Ruffino was attacked by an alligator in Fort Myers, Florida. He was rescued when a group of Seminole Indian schoolteachers pulled over and subdued the animal. No police report was filed on how Ruffino came to be attacked by the alligator. He made a full recovery, but carries scars from the incident on his left arm and in his heart. In November 2004, Kensington Books published Michael Ruffino's memoir/tour diary Gentlemanly Repose: Confessions Of A Debauched Rock & Roller. A new version of the book was published by Ecco Press, via a publishing line curated by Anthony Bourdain, and was released in 2015.

A full-length documentary feature about the band, Gringa Productions' We Like To Drink We Like To Play Rock 'N Roll premiered at the June 2006 Modern Drunkard Convention in Las Vegas.

The band played several shows during the 2006-2008 period, announcing plans to release new and previously unreleased material in 2014.

In the "Boston" episode of Anthony Bourdain: No Reservations, Ruffino appeared with talk show host Howie Carr as one of Bourdain's guides around the city.

== Discography ==
- 2001 Super Troopers (Soundtrack) TVT
- 2000 Scary Movie (Soundtrack) TVT
- 2000 Rock Hard: TVT Rock 2000 (Compilation) TVT
- 2000 Retarder (Full length) TVT
- 1994 Chung Wayne Lo Mein (Full length) Moonpig/Chunk
- 1993 Hotel Massachusetts (compilation) Chunk
- 1990 "Sink" (self-released)
- 1989 "Good Music" (self-released)

Videos

- "Geeze Louise"
- "Everybody Wants You"
