= Dustbowl (band) =

Greek country band

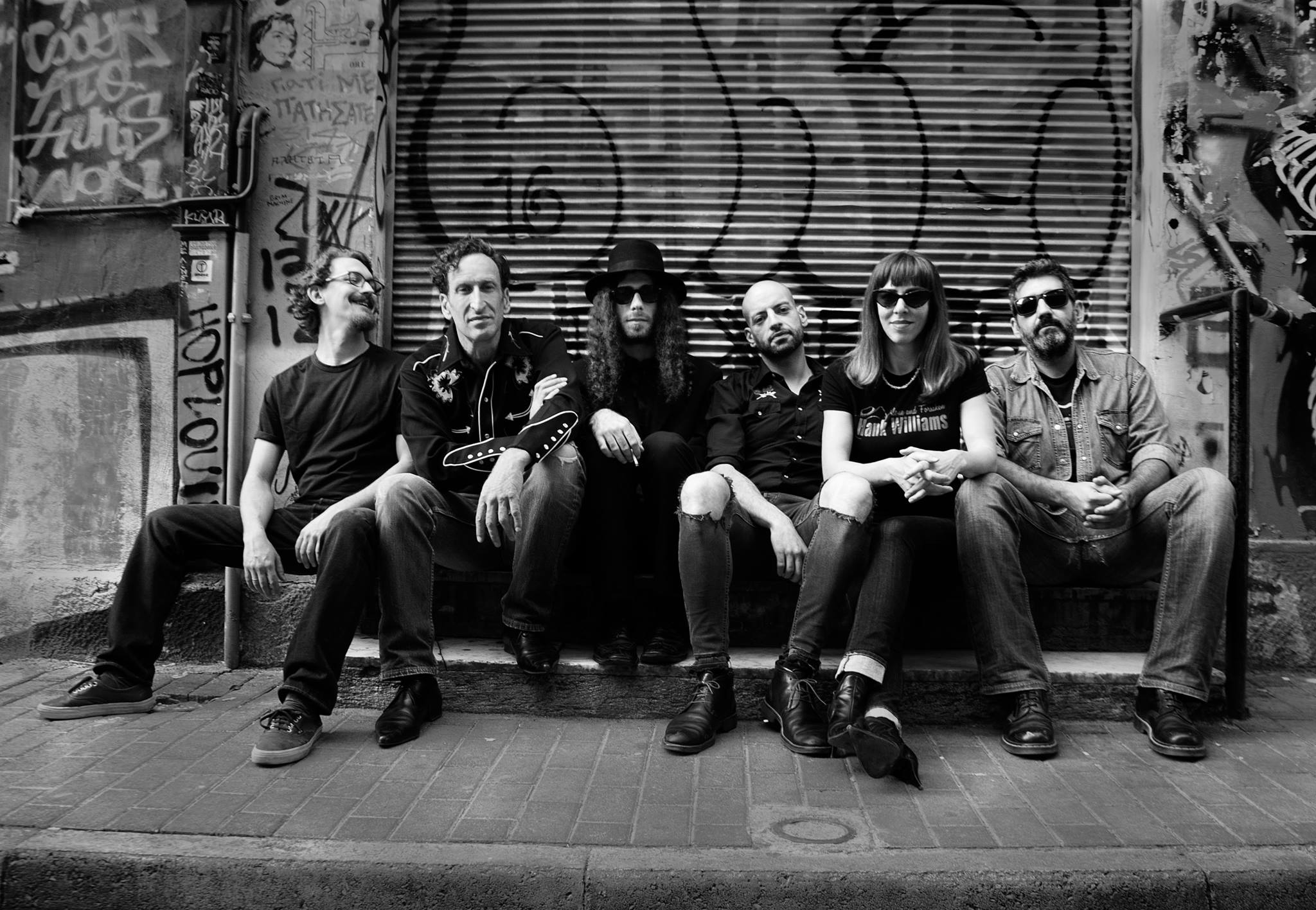

Background information
- Origin: Athens, Greece
- Genres: Country rock
- Years active: 2006–present
- Members: Panos Birbas; Nick Fysakis; John Houstoulakis; Mike Dremetsikas; Lydia Grammatikou; Dionissis Stefanopoulos
- Past members: Giotis Petrelis; Dimitris Douranos; Big George

Dustbowl is a Greek country rock band from Athens. The group was founded in 2006 by guitarist Nick Fysakis and has featured various other members.

The band has released three studio albums, the latest being The Great Fandango, released in May 2016. They have collaborated with various other musicians both in the studio and during live performances.

In November 2017, Dustbowl performed live with The Dream Syndicate in Athens.

== Discography ==
=== Studio albums ===
- 2008 Troublebound & Lonesome (Onstage Records)
- 2009 Goin' Down (Fuzz Overdose Records)
- 2016 The Great Fandango (Urban Sounds Records)

=== Singles ===
- 2014 Suicide Avenue/Winter's Almost Gone (Dusty Records)
- 2014 Black River's Chest [The Burden Revisited]/Flamin' Rose (Dusty Records)
