= After the Fall (band) =

Australian rock band

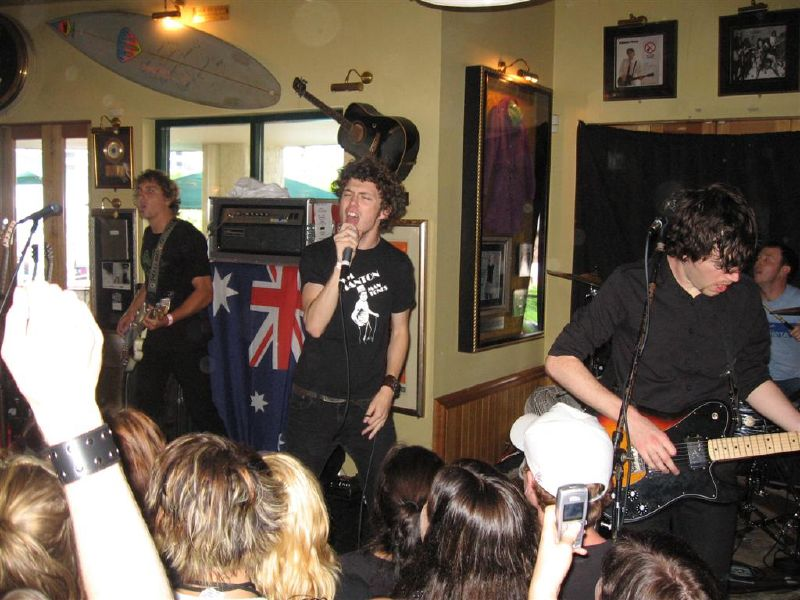
- After the Fall perform at the Hard Rock Cafe in Surfers Paradise, 2005

Background information
- Origin: Central Coast, New South Wales, Australia
- Genres: Alternative rock, pop rock
- Years active: 2000–present
- Labels: Roadrunner Records; Festival Mushroom Records; Resist Records
- Members: Mark Warner; Andrew Atkins; Ben Windsor; Matt Gor'e
- Past members: Chris Butcherine

After the Fall are an Australian rock band from the Central Coast of New South Wales, formed in 2000. The band consists of vocalist and keyboardist Benjamin Windsor, drummer Andrew Atkins, bassist Matthew Gore and guitarist Mark Edward Warner.

== Band history ==
Forming in 2000 on the Central Coast of New South Wales, After the Fall drew influences from Australian icons like Midnight Oil and AC/DC.

Their debut extended play (EP) As Far As Thoughts Can Reach was released in 2003, with the song "Three Quarter Binding" receiving airplay on Triple J. They established a following through tours with the likes of AFI, Dashboard Confessional and 28 Days.

Their debut studio album, After the Fall, was recorded in 2003, mainly in the band's own rehearsal space. It was produced by Richard Stolz, who had worked with the likes of Bodyjar and 28 Days. The single "Mirror Mirror" was high up in the Triple J Net 50 for a period of time following good airplay.

Their second album, Always Forever Now, was recorded in March 2005 with Stolz again. Vocalist Ben Windsor said the band were not fully prepared when commencing studio work for the album; "We entered the studio without a complete scope of where the record was going. I had lyrics to finish and we really weren't a 100% on what tracks we were going to lay down... We need to be pushed, and that's what happened." The album peaked at number 23 on the ARIA Charts, boosted by the single "Concrete Boots".

After the Fall have released four videos from their two albums: "Mirror Mirror" from their 2004 effort, After the Fall, and "Concrete Boots", "The Fighter", and "Outta Mind" from Always Forever Now. "The Fighter" appeared in several Australian television advertisements, including one for popular primetime show Smallville.

After the Fall have played at festivals such as Homebake, Rockit, The Falls, Splendour in the Grass, Livid, and Come Together Music Festival. In March 2005, the band traveled to the US to play at the SXSW Festival in Austin, Texas. They toured, as a supporting act, around Australia with British band The Darkness in April 2006. In mid-2006 guitarist Christopher Butcherine left the band. Butcherine appeared on both the band's self-titled album, second album Always Forever Now and debut EP As Far As Thoughts Can Reach . From 25 October to 5 November 2006, After the Fall performed on the Coca-Cola Live 'N Local Tour encompassing all major Australian cities. They played alongside other Australasian acts Evermore, The Veronicas, End of Fashion and The Hot Lies.

They performed on Triple J's Like a Version in March 2007, performing a cover of Billy Joel's "Only the Good Die Young" as well as a new song "All It Takes", rumoured to be featured on their next album. The band also performed live on Channel Ten's show Rove. In 2008, After the Fall's track "Cut Your Losses" was put in rotation on Triple J radio. The song is on a compilation album called Turning the Tide.

After previously releasing their albums through major record labels, the band decided to release independently. They recorded a third studio album in 2008, selecting a few locations including a country house in Victoria to record it. "Break Me" was released as a free download from the band's website and was not sold in traditional formats. The album was entitled [In] Exile and released through Roadrunner Records on 28 August 2009. It was produced by Richard Stolz. The band continued to gain success with the release of their next album: 2012's Bittersweet.

== Discography ==
=== Studio albums ===
List of albums, with Australian chart positions
Title	Album details	Peak chart positions
Title	Album details	AUS
After the Fall	Released: June 2004; Format: CD; Label: Mushroom Records (33801–2)	72
Always Forever Now	Released: August 2005; Format: CD; Label: Mushroom Records (33896–2)	23
[In] Exile	Released: August 2009; Format: CD, Digital; Label: Roadrunner Records Australia (RR7852-5)	–
Bittersweet	Released: November 2012; Format: CD, Digital; Label: Roadrunner Records Australia (RKDSRKDS001)	–

=== Extended plays ===
List of EPs, with selected details
Title	Details
As Far As Thoughts Can Reach	Released: 2003; Format: CD; Label: Resist Records (res024)

=== Singles ===
Title	Year	Charts	Album
Title	Year	AUS	Album
2005	"Concrete Boots"	—	Always Forever Now
2005	"The Fighter"	83	Always Forever Now
2009	"Digital Age"	—	[In] Exile
2009	"Desire"	—	[In] Exile
