= Always Forever Now =

Studio album by After The Fall
- Released: 21 August 2005
- Recorded: March 2005 – August 2005
- Genre: Alternative rock, rock
- Length: 38:53
- Label: Festival Mushroom Records
- Producer: Richard Stolz

After The Fall chronology
After the Fall (2004)	Always Forever Now (2005)	In Exile (2009)

Singles from Always Forever Now
- 1. "Concrete Boots" Released: 2005; 2. "The Fighter" Released: 2005

Always Forever Now is the second studio album by Australian rock band After the Fall, named after a song off of Original Soundtracks 1. It was released on 21 August 2005 by Festival Mushroom Records. The album was produced by Richard Stolz in Melbourne and mixed by Kevin Shirley in the United States.

The album debuted at number 36 on the Australian ARIA charts and peaked at number 23. The album achieved Album of the Week on Triple J Radio with the first single from the album "Concrete Boots", added to Triple J Radio, MTV, Channel V and Nova FM. The single also made Triple J's Hottest 100; coming in at number 30. Subsequently, it was added to Triple J's Hottest 100 CD.

The band released its second single from the album in early September 2005, "The Fighter". It also received rotation on Triple J Radio, MTV, Channel V and Nova FM. The third single from the album was "Outta Mind".

== Track listing ==
1. Outta Mind - 2:51
2. Free Yourself - 3:12
3. Concrete Boots - 3:35
4. The Fighter - 3:55
5. Hey Mister - 2:58
6. Destination Unknown - 3:25
7. Lonely, Lonely - 4:50
8. A Friend Named Karma - 2:46
9. Not Enough - 2:45
10. Voices - 3:10
11. Midnight Pain - 5:26

== Charts ==
Chart (2005)	Peak position
Australian Albums (ARIA Charts)	23
