= Future's Past =

Studio album by Dave Mason
- Released: 13 May 2014
- Genre: Rock
- Length: 42:16
- Label: Something Music
- Producer: Dave Mason

Dave Mason chronology
26 Letters - 12 Notes (2014)	Future's Past (2014)	Pink Lipstick (EP) (2017)

Future's Past is the 13th studio album by Traffic founder guitarist/vocalist Dave Mason. The album debuted at #7 on the Billboard Blues Album Charts. The album has a review of 3 out of 5 on AllMusic.

== Track listing ==
All tracks are written by Dave Mason, unless otherwise noted.

No.	Title	Writer(s)	Length
1.	"Dear Mr. Fantasy"	Jim Capaldi, Steve Winwood, Chris Wood	4:35
2.	"World In Changes"		4:02
3.	"You Can All Join In"		3:27
4.	"As Sad And Deep As You"		3:42
5.	"Good 2 U"		4:14
6.	"El Toro (Spanish Blues)"		3:38
7.	"Come On In My Kitchen"		3:02
8.	"How Do I Get To Heaven"	Dave Mason, Jim Capaldi	4:34
9.	"That's Freedom"		3:42
10.	"Thank You" (Non-Album Bonus Track)	Dave Mason, Johnne Sambataro	3:27
11.	"Feelin' Alright" (Newly Recorded Version, Non-Album Bonus Track)		3:53
Total length:			42:16

== Personnel ==
=== Musicians ===
- Dave Mason – lead vocals (1–5, 7–9), lead guitar (1, 2, 6, 9), bass guitar (2), backing vocals (2, 9), acoustic guitar (3, 4, 7, 8), electric guitar (9)
- Dave Palmer – keyboards (2), organ (2)
- Tony Patler – keyboards (3), bass guitar (3), backing vocals (3, 8), organ (8)
- Bill Mason – keyboards (4, 9), organ (4, 9)
- Mike Finnigan – keyboards (5), organ (5), backing vocals (5)
- Renato Neto – keyboards (6), organ (6), bass (6)
- Joe Bonamassa – electric guitar (1)
- John McEuen – electric guitar (1), acoustic guitar (1, 7), backing vocals (1, 7)
- Jason Roller – lead guitar (3–5, 8), backing vocals (3)
- John Sambataro – backing vocals (4), acoustic guitar (6)
- Gerald Johnson – bass guitar (1, 9)
- Bill Reynolds – bass guitar (4)
- Carmine Rojas – bass guitar (5)
- Alex Drizos – bass guitar (7)
- George Hawkins – bass guitar (8)
- T.J. Russell – drums (1, 2), backing vocals (1)
- Alvino Bennett – drums (3–5, 8, 9)
- Tal Bergman – drums (6)
- Ken Eros – drums (7)
- Warren Hill – saxophone (6)
- Bob Corritore – harmonica (7)
- Suzanne Paris – backing vocals (5)

== Production ==
- Dave Mason – producer
- Ken Eros – recording
- Matt Linesch – recording, mixing
- T.J. Russell – recording
- Reuben Cohen – mastering at Lurssen Mastering (Los Angeles, California)
- Graham Nash – front cover artwork
- Chris Jensen – graphic design, sleeve design, photography

== Charts ==
The album peaked at No. 7 on the Billboard Top Blues Albums chart.
