= Dust Bowl (album) =

Studio album by Joe Bonamassa
- Released: March 22, 2011
- Studio: Black Rock (Santorini, Greece); Ben’s Place (Nashville, Tennessee); The Cave (Malibu, CA); Village Recorder (Los Angeles, California)
- Genre: Blues rock
- Length: 63:00
- Label: J&R Adventures
- Producer: Kevin Shirley

Joe Bonamassa chronology
Black Rock (2010)	Dust Bowl (2011)	Don't Explain (2011)

Professional ratings
Review scores
Source	Rating
Allmusic	4/5 stars
Premier Guitar	4.5/5 stars

Dust Bowl is the ninth studio album by blues rock guitarist Joe Bonamassa. It was released worldwide on March 22, 2011. The cover art is based on a famous 1936 photograph by Arthur Rothstein.

== Track listing ==
No.	Title	Writer(s)	Length
1.	"Slow Train"	Joe Bonamassa, Kevin Shirley	6:49
2.	"Dust Bowl"	Bonamassa	4:33
3.	"Tennessee Plates" (ft. John Hiatt; John Hiatt cover)	John Hiatt, John Porter	4:18
4.	"The Meaning of the Blues" (Often mistakenly listed as a Bobby Troup cover, but this is an original JB song.)	Bonamassa	5:44
5.	"Black Lung Heartache"	Bonamassa	4:14
6.	"You Better Watch Yourself" (Little Walter cover)	Bonamassa, Walter Jacobs	3:30
7.	"The Last Matador of Bayonne"	Bonamassa	5:23
8.	"Heartbreaker" (ft. Glenn Hughes; Free cover)	Paul Rodgers	5:49
9.	"No Love on the Street" (Tim Curry cover)	Tim Curry, Michael Kamen	6:32
10.	"The Whale That Swallowed Jonah"	Bonamassa	4:46
11.	"Sweet Rowena" (ft. Vince Gill)	Vince Gill, Pete Wasner	4:34
12.	"Prisoner" (Barbra Streisand cover)	John Desautels, Karen Lawrence	6:48
Total length:			63:00

== Personnel ==
- Joe Bonamassa – guitars, vocals (all tracks); tzouras, baglama and slide bouzouki (tracks 2, 5); mandolin (track 10)
- Carmine Rojas – bass (tracks 1–2, 4–9, 12)
- Anton Fig – drums (tracks 1–2, 4–9, 12); percussion (tracks 2, 5); Hammer guitar (track 5); shaker (track 9)
- Rick Melick – organ (tracks 1–2, 4–8, 12); piano, tambourine (tracks 2, 5–7, 12); synthesizers (track 4), accordion (track 5)
- Peter Van Weelden – spoken word (track 2)
- John Hiatt – vocals (track 3)
- Vince Gill – guitar (tracks 3, 11); vocals (track 11)
- Michael Rhodes – bass (tracks 3, 10–11)
- Chad Cromwell – drums (tracks 3, 10–11)
- Steve Nathan – Hammond organ (track 3); piano (tracks 3, 11)
- Tony Cedras – trumpet (track 7)
- Glenn Hughes – vocals (track 8)
- Arlan Schierbaum – Hammond organ (track 9)
- Blondie Chaplin – guitar (track 9)
- Beth Hart – vocals (track 9)
- Reese Wynans – Hammond organ, piano (track 10)
- Kevin Shirley – production

== Charts ==
Chart (2011)	Peak position
Austrian Albums (Ö3 Austria)	32
Belgian Albums (Ultratop Flanders)	39
Belgian Albums (Ultratop Wallonia)	53
Danish Albums (Hitlisten)	31
Dutch Albums (Album Top 100)	12
French Albums (SNEP)	115
German Albums (Offizielle Top 100)	10
Norwegian Albums (VG-lista)	7
Scottish Albums (OCC)	13
Swedish Albums (Sverigetopplistan)	27
Swiss Albums (Schweizer Hitparade)	17
UK Albums (OCC)	12
UK Album Downloads (OCC)	22
UK Jazz & Blues Albums (OCC)	1
UK Independent Albums (OCC)	5
US Billboard 200	37
US Top Blues Albums (Billboard)	1
US Indie Store Album Sales (Billboard)	7

== Certifications ==
Certifications for Dust Bowl
Region	Certification	Certified units/sales
United Kingdom (BPI)	Silver	60,000^{‡}
^{‡} Sales+streaming figures based on certification alone.
