= Kevin Shirley =

South African/Australian record producer and engineer (born 1960)

- Also known as: The Caveman
- Born: 29 June 1960 (age 66); Johannesburg, South Africa
- Genres: Hard rock, heavy metal, rock & roll
- Years active: 1970s–present

Kevin Shirley (born 29 June 1960), also known as The Caveman, is a South African music producer, engineer, audio mixer, and musician. He has produced and engineered music for many artists, including Rush, Silverchair, Iron Maiden, Led Zeppelin, The Hoodoo Gurus, The Angels, and Cold Chisel. As of 2023 he is a musician in Jimmy Barnes' supergroup, releasing a self-titled album in 2023.

== Early life and education ==
Kevin John Shirley was born in Johannesburg, South Africa.

== Career ==
Shirley spent his early years producing and engineering records for South African artists including Robin Auld, Juluka, Jonathan Butler, Lesley Rae Dowling, Steve Louw, and Sweatband, as well as performing and recording with his own band The council, whose singer was Brian Davidson (from Freedoms Children).

He moved to Australia in 1986, where he continued working with Australian artists, such as The Hoodoo Gurus, The Angels, Cold Chisel, Girl Monstar, Tina Arena, The Screaming Jets, Baby Animals. After producing Silverchair's debut album Frogstomp, he moved to the United States.

In the US and he produced work for Aerosmith, Dream Theater, Black Country Communion, Journey, The Black Crowes, Iron Maiden, Rush, and Slayer. He also worked on the retrospective Led Zeppelin DVD. He has produced several albums for American blues-rock guitarist Joe Bonamassa. Shirley produced the Mr. Big album What If....

In March 2023, Jimmy Barnes announced the formation of supergroup The Barnestormers, featuring Barnes, Chris Cheney, Slim Jim Phantom, Jools Holland, and Kevin Shirley. A self-titled album was released on 26 May 2023.

Shirley produced Elly-May Barnes' first solo single, a cover of the Radiohead song "Creep", released on 20 November 2023. He is described as a "dear friend", and is credited as a musician on her first album, No Good, released in April 2024.

=== Other groups ===
Shirley has also produced music for The Black Crowes, Journey, Iron Maiden, Led Zeppelin, Rush, Joe Bonamassa, Beth Hart, Dream Theater, Jimmy Barnes, Cold Chisel, Joanne Shaw Taylor, The Springbok Nude Girls, All Night Radio, Steve Louw & Big Sky, HIM, Mr. Big, and Europe.

== Selected discography ==
Year	Album details	Role	Source
1984	The Council — Rising: Release date: 1984; Label: Mountain Records	Guitarist, production, engineering	
1986	All Night Radio — The Killing Floor: Release date: November 1986 (South Africa); Release date: May 1987 (Australia); Label: Previous Records	Production, engineering, mixing	
1988	Tony Johns — The Way I Live Rock City Promotions PTY. LTD. Confidential Records.	Production, Engineering, mixing	
1990	Winston Mankunku Ngozi — Crossroads: Label: Pro-Arte Records	Production, engineering, mixing	
1990	The Black Crowes — Shake Your Money Maker: Release date: February 1990; Label: Def American	Re-mix for Sho'Nuff boxset	
1990	Big Sky — Waiting for the Dawn: Release date: August 1990; Label: Gallo Records	Production, engineering, composer	
1990	Lime Spiders — Beethoven's Fist: Release date: 17 October 1990; Label: Virgin Records	Engineering, production	
1991	Peter Wells — Everything You Like Tries to Kill You: Label: Zoo Entertainment	Production, engineering mixing	
1992	Baby Animals — Baby Animals: Release date: February 1992; Label: Imago	Engineering	
1992	The Black Crowes — The Southern Harmony and Musical Companion: Release date: 12 May 1992; Label: Def American	Re-mix for Sho'Nuff boxset	
1993	Billy Squier — Tell the Truth: Release date: 27 April 1993; Label: Capitol	Engineering, mixing	
1993	Rush — Counterparts: Release date: 19 October 1993; Label: Atlantic/Anthem	Engineering	
1994	Olivia Newton-John — Gaia: One Woman's Journey: Label: Festival	Mixing	
1994	Material Issue — Freak City Soundtrack: Release date: 8 March 1994; Label: Mercury	Engineering, mixing	
1995	Silverchair — Frogstomp: Release date: 27 March 1995; Label: Murmur	Production, engineering, mixing	
1995	Ammonia — Mint 400: Release date: 16 October 1995; Label: Murmur/Epic	Production, engineering, mixing	
1996	Hoodoo Gurus — Blue Cave: Release date: May 1996; Label: Mushroom/True North/Zoo	Mixing	
1996	Divinyls — Underworld: Release date: 11 November 1996; Label: BMG	Engineering, mixing	
1996	Journey — Trial by Fire: Release date: 22 November 1996; Label: Columbia	Production, engineering, mixing	
1997	Aerosmith — Nine Lives: Release date: 18 March 1997; Label: Columbia	Production, engineering, mixing	
1997	Dream Theater — Falling into Infinity: Release date: 23 September 1997; Label: EastWest	Production, engineering, mixing	
1997	Jackyl — Cut the Crap: Release date: 14 October 1997; Label: Epic	Mixing	
1998	The Angels — Skin & Bone: Release date: March 1998; Label: Liberation Music	Mixing	
1998	Liquid Tension Experiment — Liquid Tension Experiment: Release date: 10 March 1998; Label: Magna Carta	Mixing	
1998	Journey — Greatest Hits Live: Release date: 24 March 1998; Label: Columbia	Production, mixing	
1998	Rocket from the Crypt — RFTC: Release date: 2 June 1998; Label: Interscope	Production, engineering, mixing	
1998	Cold Chisel — The Last Wave of Summer: Release date: 25 August 1998; Label: Mushroom	Mixing	
1998	Dream Theater — Once in a LIVEtime: Release date: 27 October 1998; Label: EastWest	Production, engineering, mixing	
1999	The Black Crowes — By Your Side: Release date: 12 January 1999; Label: Columbia	Production, engineering, mixing	
1999	Silverchair — Neon Ballroom: Release date: 8 March 1999; Label: Sony/Murmur	Mixing	
1999	Buck-O-Nine — Libido: Release date: 16 March 1999; Label: TVT	Mixing	
1999	Liquid Tension Experiment — Liquid Tension Experiment 2: Release date: 15 June 1999; Label: Magna Carta	Mixing	
1999	Amanda Marshall — Tuesday's Child: Release date: 22 June 1999; Label: Sony/Epic	Production, engineering, mixing	
1999	doubleDrive — 1000 Yard Stare: Release date: 17 August 1999; Label: MCA	Mixing	
1999	Our Lady Peace — Happiness... Is Not a Fish That You Can Catch: Release date: 21 September 1999; Label: Columbia	Mixing	
1999	Big Sky — Best of the Decade: Release date: 4 October 1999; Label: Epic	Production: compilation Production, engineering, mixing: "Destiny", "Skin Deep"	
1999	Billionaire — Ascension: Release date: 19 October 1999; Label: Slash	Mixing	
1999	Dream Theater — Metropolis Pt. 2: Scenes from a Memory: Release date: 26 October 1999; Label: Elektra	Mixing (tracks 2–8, 11)	
1999	Little Steven — Born Again Savage: Release date: 30 November 1999; Label: Pachyderm	Mixing	
2000	Jimmy Page and The Black Crowes — Live at the Greek: Release date: 29 February 2000; Label: TVT	Production, engineering, mixing	
2000	The Unband — Retarder: Release date: 7 March 2000; Label: TVT	Mixing	
2000	Joe Satriani — Engines of Creation: Release date: 14 March 2000; Label: Epic	Production, engineering, mixing	
2000	Iron Maiden — Brave New World: Release date: 29 May 2000; Label: EMI	Production, engineering, mixing	
2000	Tidewater Grain — Here on the Outside: Release date: 12 September 2000; Label: RuffNation	Production, engineering, mixing	
2001	Journey — Arrival: Release date: 3 April 2001; Label: Columbia	Production, engineering, mixing	
2001	Bodyjar — How It Works: Release date: 10 July 2001; Label: Capitol	Mixing	
2001	HIM — Deep Shadows and Brilliant Highlights: Release date: 27 August 2001; Label: BMG	Production, engineering, mixing	
2001	Dream Theater — Live Scenes from New York: Release date: 11 September 2001; Label: Elektra	Production, engineering, mixing	
2001	SOiL — Scars: Release date: 11 September 2001; Label: J	Mixing	
2002	Silvertide — American Excess (EP): Label: J	Production, engineering, mixing	
2002	Dream Theater — Six Degrees of Inner Turbulence: Release date: 29 January 2002; Label: Elektra	Mixing	
2002	Iron Maiden — Rock in Rio: Release date: 25 March 2002; Label: EMI	Production, engineering, mixing	
2002	Neurotica — Neurotica: Release date: 25 June 2002; Label: SmackDown!	Mixing	
2002	Steve Louw & Big Sky — Beyond The Blue: Release Date: 9 September 2002; Label: Sony	Production, engineering, mixing	
2002	Lordi — Get Heavy: Release date: 1 November 2002; Label: BMG Finland	Mixing	
2003	Span — Mass Distraction: Label: Interscope/Island	Mixing	
2003	Led Zeppelin — How the West Was Won: Release date: 27 May 2003; Label: Atlantic	Engineering, mixing	
2003	Iron Maiden — Dance of Death: Release date: 2 September 2003; Label: EMI	Production, engineering, mixing	
2003	Josh Ritter — Hello Starling: Release date: 9 September 2003; Label: V2	Mixing	
2003	Dream Theater — Train of Thought: Release date: 11 November 2003; Label: Elektra	Mixing	
2004	Silvertide — Show and Tell: Release date: 8 June 2004; Label: J	Production, engineering, mixing	
2004	Hurricane Party — Get This (EP): Release date: 10 August 2004; Label: Sanctuary	Mixing	
2004	New York Dolls — The Return of the New York Dolls: Live from Royal Festival Hall, 2004: Release date: 28 September 2004; Label: Attack	Remixing	
2004	Dream Theater — Live at Budokan: Release date: 5 October 2004; Label: Atlantic	Mixing	
2005	Josh Ritter — 4 Songs Live (EP): Release date: 22 February 2005; Label: V2	Mixing	
2005	Oz Noy — Ha!: Release date: 26 April 2005; Label: Magna Carta	Mixing	
2005	Supagroup — Rules: Release date: 31 May 2005; Label: Foodchain	Production, engineering, mixing	
2005	After the Fall — Always Forever Now: Release date: 21 August 2005; Label: Festival Mushroom	Mixing	
2005	Iron Maiden — Death on the Road: Release date: 30 August 2005; Label: EMI	Production, engineering, mixing	
2006	Soulphood — Liquid Dynamite: Release date: 17 January 2006; Label: Rock Lord	Mixing	
2006	Oliver Black — Live in Texas (EP): Release date: 21 March 2006; Label: TVT	Production, engineering, mixing	
2006	Joe Bonamassa — You & Me: Release date: 6 June 2006; Label: J&R Adventures	Production, engineering, mixing	
2006	Black Stone Cherry — Black Stone Cherry: Release date: 18 July 2006; Label: Roadrunner	Mixing	
2006	Iron Maiden — A Matter of Life and Death: Release date: 28 August 2006; Label: EMI	Production, engineering, mixing	
2007	Kittie — Funeral for Yesterday: Release date: 20 February 2007; Label: Merovingian	Mixing	
2007	The Mooney Suzuki — Have Mercy: Release date: 19 June 2007; Label: Elixia	Mixing	
2007	Joe Bonamassa — Sloe Gin: Release date: 21 August 2007; Label: J&R Adventures	Production, engineering, mixing	
2007	Oz Noy — Fuzzy: Release date: 11 September 2007; Label: Magna Carta	Mixing	
2007	Supagroup — Fire for Hire: Release date: 25 September 2007; Label: Foodchain	Production, engineering, mixing	
	Big Sky — Trancas Canyon: Release date: April 2008; Label: Sony	Production, engineering, mixing	
2008	Jordan Zevon — Insides Out: Release date: 15 April 2008; Label: New West	Engineering, mixing	
2008	Journey — Revelation: Release date: 3 June 2008; Label: Nomota/Frontiers	Production, engineering, mixing	
2008	Lauren Harris — Calm Before the Storm: Release date: 10 June 2008; Label: Demolition	Mixing	
2008	Joe Bonamassa — Live from Nowhere in Particular: Release date: 19 August 2008; Label: J&R Adventures	Production, engineering, mixing	
2008	Dream Theater — Chaos in Motion 2007–2008: Release date: 22 October 2008; Label: Roadrunner	Mixing	
2009	Joe Bonamassa — The Ballad of John Henry: Release date: 24 February 2009; Label: J&R Adventures	Production, engineering, mixing	
2009	Iron Maiden — Flight 666 – The Original Soundtrack: Release date: 22 May 2009; Label: EMI	Production, engineering, mixing	
2009	Joe Bonamassa — Live from the Royal Albert Hall: Release date: 22 September 2009; Label: J&R Adventures	Production, engineering, mixing	
2009	Hollywood Undead — Desperate Measures: Release date: 10 November 2009; Label: A&M/Octone	Mixing	
2010	Joe Bonamassa — Black Rock: Release date: 23 March 2010; Label: J&R Adventures	Production, engineering, mixing, photography	
2010	Iron Maiden — The Final Frontier: Release date: 13 August 2010; Label: EMI	Production, engineering, mixing	
2010	Black Country Communion — Black Country: Release date: 20 September 2010; Label: Mascot/J&R Adventures	Production, engineering, mixing, lyricist, composer	
2010	Mr. Big — What If...: Release date: 15 December 2010; Label: Frontiers/Victor	Production, engineering, mixing	
2011	Joe Bonamassa — Dust Bowl: Release date: 22 March 2011; Label: J&R Adventures	Production, engineering, mixing, composer, photography	
2011	Journey — Eclipse: Release date: 23 May 2011; Label: Nomota/Frontiers	Production, engineering, mixing	
2011	Black Country Communion — 2: Release date: 13 June 2011; Label: Mascot/J&R Adventures	Production, engineering, mixing, composer, liner notes	
2011	John Hiatt — Dirty Jeans and Mudslide Hymns: Release date: 2 August 2011; Label: New West	Production, engineering, mixing	
2011	Beth Hart and Joe Bonamassa — Don't Explain: Release date: 27 September 2011; Label: J&R Adventures/Mascot	Production, engineering, mixing	
2012	Black Country Communion — Live Over Europe: Release date: 27 February 2012; Label: Mascot/J&R Adventures	Production, engineering, mixing, composer, liner notes	
2012	Iron Maiden — En Vivo!: Release date: 23 March 2012; Label: EMI	Production, engineering, mixing	
2012	Joe Bonamassa — Driving Towards the Daylight: Release date: 22 May 2012; Label: J&R Adventures/Provogue	Production, engineering, mixing, guitar, tambourine, toy piano, cowbell, percussion	
2012	Robert Cray Band — Nothin but Love: Release date: 27 August 2012; Label: Provogue	Production, engineering, mixing	
2012	Joe Bonamassa — Beacon Theatre: Live from New York: Release date: 24 September 2012; Label: J&R Adventures	Production, engineering, mixing, composer, photography	
2012	Steve Harris — British Lion: Release date: 24 September 2012; Label: EMI	Mixing	
2012	John Hiatt — Mystic Pinball: Release date: 25 September 2012; Label: New West	Production, engineering, mixing	
2012	Beth Hart — Bang Bang Boom Boom: Release date: 16 October 2012; Label: Provogue/Mascot	Production, engineering, mixing	
2012	Black Country Communion — Afterglow: Release date: 29 October 2012; Label: Mascot/J&R Adventures	Production, engineering, mixing, composer	
2013	Joe Bonamassa — An Acoustic Evening at the Vienna Opera House: Release date: 25 March 2013; Label: J&R Adventures	Production, engineering, mixing, composer	
2013	Iron Maiden — Maiden England '88: Release date: 25 March 2013; Label: EMI	Mixing	
2013	Beth Hart and Joe Bonamassa — Seesaw: Release date: 20 May 2013; Label: J&R Adventures/Mascot	Production, engineering, mixing	
2013	Black Star Riders — All Hell Breaks Loose: Release date: 21 May 2013; Label: Nuclear Blast	Production, engineering, mixing, percussion	
2015	Iron Maiden — The Book of Souls: Release date: 4 September 2015; Label: Parlophone	Production, engineering, mixing	
2021	Smith/Kotzen — Smith/Kotzen: Release date: 26 March 2021; Label: BMG	Mixing	
2021	Steve Louw — Headlight Dreams: Release date: 7 May 2021; Label: BFD / The Orchard	Production, mixing	
2021	Iron Maiden — Senjutsu: Release date: 3 September 2021; Label: Parlophone	Production, engineering, mixing	
2022	Steve Louw — Thunder and Rain: Release date: 11 November 2022; Label: BFD / The Orchard	Production, mixing	
2024	Steve Louw — Between Time: Release date: 6 September 2024; Label: BFD / The Orchard	Production, mixing	
2026	Steve Louw — Traces of the Flood: Release date: 15 May 2026; Label: BFD / The Orchard	Production, mixing	
