= Sloe Gin (album) =

Studio album by Joe Bonamassa
- Released: August 21, 2007
- Genre: Blues rock
- Length: 48:52
- Label: J&R Adventures
- Producer: Kevin Shirley

Joe Bonamassa chronology
You & Me (2006)	Sloe Gin (2007)	Live from Nowhere in Particular (2008)

Sloe Gin is the sixth studio album by American blues rock musician Joe Bonamassa. Produced by Kevin Shirley, it was released on August 21, 2007 by J&R Adventures and topped the US Billboard Top Blues Albums chart. The title of the album is a reference to the song of the same name by English musician Tim Curry from his 1978 debut album Read My Lips.

== Reception ==
Professional ratings
Review scores
Source	Rating
Allmusic	4/5 stars

Music website Allmusic gave Sloe Gin four out of five stars, with reviewer Steve Leggett claiming that the album showed how Bonamassa had "stepped up his songwriting ... and cut way down on his clichés, delivering in the process his most varied and impressive album yet".

== Track listing ==
No.	Title	Writer(s)	Length
1.	"Ball Peen Hammer" (Chris Whitley cover)	Chris Whitley	3:27
2.	"One of These Days" (Ten Years After cover)	Alvin Lee, Joe Bonamassa	5:40
3.	"Seagull" (Bad Company cover)	Paul Rodgers, Mick Ralphs	3:49
4.	"Dirt in My Pocket"	Bonamassa, James Huff	4:54
5.	"Sloe Gin" (Tim Curry cover)	Bob Ezrin, Michael Kamen	8:13
6.	"Another Kind of Love" (John Mayall cover)	John Mayall	3:10
7.	"Around the Bend"	Bonamassa, Will Jennings	5:15
8.	"Black Night" (Charles Brown cover)	Jessie Mae Robinson	4:22
9.	"Jelly Roll" (John Martyn cover)	John Martyn	2:12
10.	"Richmond"	Bonamassa, Mike Himelstein	4:31
11.	"India"	Bonamassa, Rick Melick	3:19
Total length:			48:52

== Chart performance ==
Chart (2007)	Peak
US Billboard 200	184
US Billboard Top Blues Albums	1
Dutch Albums Chart	27
Swedish Albums Chart	39
UK Albums Chart	50

== Personnel ==
Musical performers

- Joe Bonamassa – guitars, vocals
- Carmine Rojas – bass
- Anton Fig – drums, percussion
- Rick Melick – keyboards, tabla
- Bogie Bowles – hammered dulcimer, drums on "Seagull"

Additional personnel

- Jeff Bova – orchestration
- The Bovaland Symphonic Orchestra – strings
- Kevin Shirley – production, mixing
- Jared Kvitka – engineering
- Ryan Smith – mastering
