= Had to Cry Today (album) =

Studio album by Joe Bonamassa
- Released: August 24, 2004
- Genre: Blues rock
- Length: 46:02
- Label: J&R Adventures
- Producer: Bob Held

Joe Bonamassa chronology
Blues Deluxe (2003)	Had to Cry Today (2004)	You & Me (2006)

Had to Cry Today is the fourth studio album by American blues rock musician Joe Bonamassa. Produced by Bob Held, it was released on August 24, 2004 by J&R Adventures and reached number five on the US Billboard Top Blues Albums chart. The title of the album is a reference to the song of the same name by English blues rock band Blind Faith from their 1969 self-titled album.

== Reception ==
Professional ratings
Review scores
Source	Rating
Allmusic	3.5/5 stars

Music website Allmusic gave Had to Cry Today 3.5 out of five stars, a slight improvement on previous release Blues Deluxe.

== Track listing ==
No.	Title	Writer(s)	Length
1.	"Never Make Your Move Too Soon" (B.B. King cover)	Stix Hooper, Will Jennings	4:06
2.	"Travellin' South" (Albert Collins cover)	Gwendolyn Collins	3:50
3.	"Junction 61"	Joe Bonamassa	0:48
4.	"Reconsider Baby" (Lowell Fulson cover)	Lowell Fulson	6:51
5.	"Around the Bend"	Bonamassa, Jennings	5:11
6.	"Revenge of the 10 Gallon Hat"	Bonamassa	2:54
7.	"When She Dances"	Bonamassa, Jennings	4:53
8.	"Had to Cry Today" (Blind Faith cover)	Steve Winwood	6:49
9.	"The River"	Bonamassa, Bob Held	5:30
10.	"When the Sun Goes Down"	Bonamassa, Jennings	2:44
11.	"Faux Mantini"	Bonamassa	2:26

== Chart performance ==
Chart (2004)	Peak
US Billboard Top Blues Albums	5

== Personnel ==
Musical performers

- Joe Bonamassa – guitars, acoustic guitar, vocals
- Eric Czar – bass, fretless bass
- Kenny Kramme – drums, percussion
- Benny Harrison – Hammond organ
- Jon Paris – harmonica

Additional personnel

- Bob Held – production
- Gary Tole – engineering, mixing
- Eric Carlinsky – engineering assistance
- Scott Hull – mastering
- Dennis Friel – art direction, graphic design
- Chris Marksbury – photography
