= A New Day Yesterday (Joe Bonamassa album) =

2000 studio album by Joe Bonamassa

Studio album by Joe Bonamassa
- Released: October 24, 2000
- Recorded: 2000
- Studio: Pyramid Recording Studios (Ithaca, New York)
- Genre: Blues rock, hard rock
- Length: 55:40
- Label: Okeh; Epic; 550
- Producer: Tom Dowd

Joe Bonamassa chronology
A New Day Yesterday (2000)	A New Day Yesterday Live (2002)

Singles from A New Day Yesterday
- 1. "Miss You, Hate You" Released: 2001; 2. "Colour and Shape" Released: 2002

A New Day Yesterday is the debut studio album by American blues rock musician Joe Bonamassa. Recorded at Pyramid Recording Studios in Ithaca, New York, it was produced by Tom Dowd and released on October 24, 2000, by independent record label Okeh in tandem with Epic Records and 550 Music. The album registered at number 9 on the US Billboard Top Blues Albums chart and spawned the singles "Miss You, Hate You" in 2001 and "Colour and Shape" in 2002.

Taking its title from the song of the same name by British progressive rock band Jethro Tull, a recording of which is featured on the album, A New Day Yesterday features six original tracks written by Bonamassa and others, in addition to six cover versions of songs by classic blues and rock artists. The album was reviewed positively by critics, who praised Bonamassa's performances throughout on both the original and cover songs, identifying it as a strong debut release.

To mark the album's 20th anniversary, A New Day Yesterday was remixed, remastered and reissued in 2020 under the title A New Day Now: 20th Anniversary Edition. The reissue was produced by Kevin Shirley, features re-recorded vocals, and includes three previously unreleased recordings from 1997 produced by Steven Van Zandt. A New Day Now topped the US Billboard Blues Albums chart. The remixes of "Cradle Rock" and "Colour and Shape" were issued as singles.

== Background and release ==
Joe Bonamassa recorded his debut album at Pyramid Recording Studios in Ithaca, New York with producer Tom Dowd. His backing band included bassist Greg "Creamo" Liss and drummer Tony Cintron, with guest musicians including Rick Derringer, Leslie West, Gregg Allman and David Borden also contributing to select tracks. A New Day Yesterday was released on October 24, 2000, by Okeh in tandem with Epic Records and 550 Music. "Miss You, Hate You" was released as the first single from the album in 2001, accompanied by Bonamassa's first music video. "Colour and the Shape" was issued as a promotional single in 2002.

After an initial limited release, A New Day Yesterday "caught the ears of veteran record executives" and was re-released in September 2001 by Medalist Entertainment. Later reissues would follow between 2005 and 2012 by Bonamassa's own record company J&R Adventures and his European label Provogue Records. All later releases include the original full-length version of "Miss You, Hate You" as a bonus track. The album was promoted on a North American concert tour throughout 2001, the final date of which (December 12, 2001) was recorded for Bonamassa's first live album and video, 2002's A New Day Yesterday Live.

== Reception ==
=== Commercial ===
Despite being released almost two years earlier, A New Day Yesterday debuted at number 9 on the US Billboard Top Blues Albums chart in the week of August 17, 2002. Bonamassa's second studio album So, It's Like That would enter the chart at number 2 just two weeks later. The album has the lowest peak position on the chart, with all of Bonamassa's future releases reaching higher than number 9.

=== Critical ===
Professional ratings
Review scores
Source	Rating
AllMusic	4/5 stars

A New Day Yesterday received positive reviews from critics. AllMusic's Eduardo Rivadavia described the album as "a fine debut by guitar ace Joe Bonamassa", claiming that it proves the guitarist and vocalist to be "much more than a traditional bluesman". Rivadavia highlighted several songs on the album, including "A New Day Yesterday", the cover of which he dubbed "a jaw-dropping performance"; the singles "Miss You, Hate You" and "Colour and the Shape", which he described as a "jolting double whammy" and "the most obvious standouts"; and "If Heartaches Were Nickels", which he noted featured "a tense, riveting performance". In a review of the album's lead single "Miss You, Hate You", Chuck Taylor of Billboard magazine praised Bonamassa as "a bold talent, who rises above narrow radio formatics", outlining that the song "throws in all the ingredients of a classic rock moment, led by a thrush of driving guitars ... and a vocal that sounds like sandpaper against velcro".

== A New Day Now ==
A New Day Now

Studio album by Joe Bonamassa
- Released: August 7, 2020
- Length: 73:15
- Label: J&R Adventures
- Producer: Tom Dowd; Kevin Shirley; Steven Van Zandt

Joe Bonamassa chronology
Live at the Sydney Opera House (2019)	A New Day Now (2020)	Royal Tea (2020)

Singles from A New Day Now
- 1. "Cradle Rock" Released: June 26, 2020; 2. "Colour and Shape" Released: July 17, 2020

In 2020, to mark the 20th anniversary of its original release, A New Day Yesterday was remastered and reissued as A New Day Now: 20th Anniversary Edition. The album was remixed and remastered by Kevin Shirley, Bonamassa's long-time producer, and also features three previously unreleased recordings from a 1997 session with producer Steven Van Zandt. The remixed versions of "Cradle Rock" and "Colour and Shape" were released as singles to promote the album.

Bonamassa has stated that the decision to remix the album, which also included re-recording the vocal tracks with Shirley, was done partly in tribute to producer Tom Dowd, who died in 2002. Reflecting on the original recording, the musician stated: "I never felt like I deserved a guy like Tom Dowd to produce my first album. Tom saw a little pebble in a stream, that could travel down and eventually become this nugget of gold, if you want to call it that, and he had a vision for me that I didn't see. I appreciate that and I wanted to pay tribute to him as a man who mentored me through that time." Additional recording for A New Day Now took place at Abbey Road Studios in London, England, NightBird Studios in Hollywood, Los Angeles, and Shirley's "The Cave" studios in Malibu, California and Sydney, Australia.

A New Day Now debuted at number 1 on the US Billboard Blues Albums chart and spent 38 weeks on the chart. It also registered at number 27 on the Top Current Album Sales chart and number 29 on the Top Album Sales chart. Outside the US, the album reached number 31 on the Austrian Albums Chart, number 121 on the Belgian (Wallonia) Albums Chart, number 29 on the Dutch Albums Chart, number 13 on the German Albums Chart, number 12 on the Scottish Albums Chart, number 33 on the Swiss Albums Chart, number 96 on the UK Albums Chart, and number 1 on the UK Jazz & Blues Albums Chart.

The 20th anniversary edition of A New Day Yesterday received mixed reviews from critics. Reviewing the album for Classic Rock magazine, John Aizlewood praised the re-recorded vocals, claiming that Bonamassa's voice has "improved beyond recognition" since the original album's release, but he noted the weakness of the source material by claiming that "he's long swapped this overly reverential approach for superior, more innovative material". Similarly, Pete Feenstra of Get Ready to Rock praised some of the reworkings of original recordings, in particular "Headaches to Heartbreaks", but questioned the motivations of the project as a whole, claiming that it "sidelines the tension and focus of the original song[s]". Feenstra also criticised the inclusion of the 1997 demo recordings, which he described as "out of sync with the project".

== Track listing ==
A New Day Yesterday track listing
No.	Title	Writer(s)	Length
1.	"Cradle Rock" (Rory Gallagher cover)	Rory Gallagher	3:50
2.	"Walk in My Shadows" (Free cover)	Paul Rodgers; Paul Kossoff; Simon Kirke; Andy Fraser	3:27
3.	"A New Day Yesterday" (Jethro Tull cover)	Ian Anderson	4:45
4.	"I Know Where I Belong"	Joe Bonamassa	5:38
5.	"Miss You, Hate You" (rock radio remix)	Bonamassa; Richard Feldman	3:39
6.	"Nuthin' I Wouldn't Do (For a Woman Like You)" (Al Kooper cover)	Al Kooper	5:10
7.	"Colour and Shape"	Bonamassa	5:03
8.	"Headaches to Heartbreaks"	Bonamassa	4:56
9.	"Trouble Waiting"	Bonamassa; Steve Tyrell; Stephanie Tyrell	3:25
10.	"If Heartaches Were Nickels" (Kenny Neal cover)	Warren Haynes	7:51
11.	"Current Situation"	Bonamassa	3:35
12.	"Don't Burn Down That Bridge" (Albert King cover)	Allen Jones; Carl Wells	4:21
Total length:			55:40

A New Day Yesterday bonus track
No.	Title	Writer(s)	Length
13.	"Miss You, Hate You" (full-length version)	Bonamassa; Feldman	6:04
Total length:			61:44

A New Day Now: 20th Anniversary Edition track listing
No.	Title	Writer(s)	Length
1.	"Cradle Rock" (Rory Gallagher cover)	Gallagher	3:50
2.	"Walk in My Shadows" (Free cover)	Rodgers; Kossoff; Kirke; Fraser	3:29
3.	"A New Day Yesterday" (Jethro Tull cover)	Anderson	4:47
4.	"I Know Where I Belong"	Bonamassa	5:40
5.	"Miss You, Hate You"	Bonamassa; Feldman	6:03
6.	"Nuthin' I Wouldn't Do (For a Woman Like You)" (Al Kooper cover)	Kooper	5:55
7.	"Colour and Shape"	Bonamassa	4:30
8.	"Headaches to Heartbreaks"	Bonamassa	5:00
9.	"Trouble Waiting"	Bonamassa; Steve Tyrell; Stephanie Tyrell	3:30
10.	"If Heartaches Were Nickels" (Kenny Neal cover)	Haynes	6:02
11.	"Current Situation"	Bonamassa	3:39
12.	"Don't Burn Down That Bridge" (Albert King cover)	Jones; Wells	4:22
13.	"Hey Mona"	Bonamassa; Steven Van Zandt	4:56
14.	"I Want You" (Bob Dylan cover)	Bob Dylan	5:22
15.	"Line of Denial"	Bonamassa; Van Zandt	6:09
Total length:			73:15

== Personnel ==
Musicians

- Joe Bonamassa – guitar, vocals
- Creamo Liss – bass
- Tony Cintron – drums
- Annie and Jeannie Burns – vocals (tracks 5 and 13)
- Rick Derringer – vocals and guitar solo (track 6)
- David Borden – keyboards (track 8)
- Len Bonamassa – guitar (track 9)
- Leslie West – vocals and guitar solo (track 10)
- Gregg Allman – vocals and organ (track 10)

Additional personnel

- Tom Dowd – production
- Alex Perialas – production assistance, engineering, mixing
- Jason Arnold – additional engineering
- Bob Held – mixing (track 5)
- Vlado Meller – mastering
- Scott Hull – mastering (track 5)
- Stephen Byram – artwork, design
- Julia Kuskin – photography
- Mark Avers – photography

A New Day Now personnel

- Kevin Shirley – additional recording and production, mixing, liner notes
- Steven Van Zandt – production (tracks 13–15)
- Brent Spear – tape transfer
- Kate Moss – design
- Joe Bonamassa – liner notes

== Chart positions ==
A New Day Yesterday chart positions

Chart (2002)	Peak position
US Top Blues Albums (Billboard)	9

A New Day Now: 20th Anniversary Edition chart positions

Chart (2020)	Peak position
Austrian Albums (Ö3 Austria)	31
Belgian Albums (Ultratop Wallonia)	121
Dutch Albums (Album Top 100)	29
German Albums (Offizielle Top 100)	13
Scottish Albums (OCC)	12
Swiss Albums (Schweizer Hitparade)	33
UK Albums (OCC)	96
UK Album Downloads (OCC)	52
UK Albums Sales (OCC)	13
UK Independent Albums (OCC)	5
UK Jazz & Blues Albums (OCC)	1
UK Physical Albums (OCC)	14
UK Vinyl Albums (OCC)	16
US Top Album Sales (Billboard)	29
US Top Blues Albums (Billboard)	1
US Top Current Album Sales (Billboard)	23
