= You & Me (Joe Bonamassa album) =

Studio album by Joe Bonamassa
- Released: June 6, 2006
- Recorded: Unique (New York City)
- Genre: Blues rock
- Length: 50:11
- Label: J&R Adventures
- Producer: Kevin Shirley

Joe Bonamassa chronology
| Had to Cry Today (2004) | You & Me (2006) | Sloe Gin (2007) |

You & Me is the fifth studio album by American blues rock musician Joe Bonamassa. Produced by Kevin Shirley, it was released on June 6, 2006, by J&R Adventures and topped the US Billboard Top Blues Albums chart. It is Bonamassa's first album not to contain a title track.

== Reception ==
Professional ratings
Review scores
| Source | Rating |
|---|---|
| Allmusic | 3.5/5 stars |
| Prefix | 4/10 |

Music website Allmusic gave You & Me 3.5 out of five stars, with reviewer Hal Horowitz calling the album "a solid blues-rock release and arguably his best work to date", but also an album "that doesn't take the chances that he claims might push the guitarist into uncharted territory". Music magazine Prefix published their review with a rating of four out of ten, criticising the indulgence of the style of music displayed on the album as displayed in the many guitar solos.

== Track listing ==
| No. | Title | Writer(s) | Length |
|---|---|---|---|
| 1. | "High Water Everywhere" (Charley Patton cover) | Charlie Patton | 4:06 |
| 2. | "Bridge to Better Days" | Joe Bonamassa | 5:07 |
| 3. | "Asking Around for You" | Bonamassa, Mike Himelstein | 4:17 |
| 4. | "So Many Roads" (Otis Rush cover) | Marshall Paul | 7:05 |
| 5. | "I Don't Believe" (Bobby Bland cover) | Manuel Charles, Don Robey | 3:22 |
| 6. | "Tamp Em Up Solid" (Ry Cooder cover) | Ry Cooder | 2:30 |
| 7. | "Django" (Django Reinhardt cover) | Robert Bosmans, Etienne Lefebvre | 4:56 |
| 8. | "Tea for One" (Led Zeppelin cover) | Jimmy Page, Robert Plant | 9:34 |
| 9. | "Palm Trees Helicopters and Gasoline" | Bonamassa | 1:47 |
| 10. | "Your Funeral and My Trial" (Sonny Boy Williamson cover) | Sonny Boy Williamson | 2:59 |
| 11. | "Torn Down" | Bonamassa, Gregg Sutton | 4:28 |

== Chart performance ==
| Chart (2006) | Peak |
|---|---|
| Dutch Albums Chart | 68 |
| US Billboard Top Blues Albums | 1 |

== Personnel ==
Primary musical performers

- Joe Bonamassa – guitars, vocals
- Carmine Rojas – bass
- Jason Bonham – drums
- Rick Melick – piano, organ, tambourine
- Jeff Bova – orchestration, programming

Additional musicians

- Pat Thrall – additional guitar on "Bridge to Better Days"
- Doug Henthorn – vocals on "Tea for One"
- LD Miller – harmonica on "Your Funeral and My Trial"

Additional personnel

- Kevin Shirley – production, mixing
- Mark Gray – engineering
- Justin Pintar – engineering assistance
- Luis Tovar – engineering assistance
- Leon Zervos – mastering
