= So, It's Like That =

Studio album by Joe Bonamassa
- Released: August 13, 2002
- Recorded: 2002
- Studio: Harddrive Recording Studio (North Hollywood, Los Angeles, California); Blue Iron Gate Studio (Santa Monica, California); Spike Recording Studio (New York City, New York)
- Genre: Blues rock
- Length: 61:54
- Label: Medalist
- Producer: Clif Magness; Dave Bassett; Matt Chiaravalle; Richard Feldman

Joe Bonamassa chronology
A New Day Yesterday (2000)	So, It's Like That (2002)	Blues Deluxe (2003)

Singles from So, It's Like That
- 1. "Unbroken" Released: 2002

So, It's Like That is the second studio album by American blues-rock musician Joe Bonamassa. Recorded largely at Harddrive Recording Studio in North Hollywood, California and Blue Iron Gate Studio in Santa Monica, California, it was primarily produced by Clif Magness, with additional production by Dave Bassett, Matt Chiaravalle and Richard Feldman. The album was released on August 13, 2002 by Medalist Entertainment and topped the US Billboard Top Blues Albums chart.

Contrary to Bonamassa's 2000 debut album A New Day Yesterday, which featured a mix of original songs and cover versions, So, It's Like That is made up almost entirely of tracks written by Bonamassa and a range of collaborators. The album is the first to feature bassist Eric Czar and drummer Kenny Kramme, with producer Magness performing organ, piano and percussion. Media response to So, It's Like That was mixed, with some commentators criticising Bonamassa's songwriting.

== Background and release ==
Recording for Joe Bonamassa's second studio album began at Harddrive Recording Studio in North Hollywood, Los Angeles, California, before vocals, additional guitars and keyboards were recorded at Blue Iron Gate Studio in Santa Monica, California; "No Slack" was recorded at Spike Recording Studio in New York City, New York. Production was handled primarily by Clif Magness, with Dave Bassett producing "Under the Radar" and "The Hard Way", Matt Chiaravalle producing "No Slack", and Richard Feldman producing "Mother Love". The album is Bonamassa's first to feature entirely original songs and no cover versions: with the exception of "Unbroken", which was written by Annie Roboff and Holly Lamar, all tracks were written by Bonamassa, with co-writers including Mark "Diesel" Lizotte, Mike Himelstein and Will Jennings.

So, It's Like That is also Bonamassa's first album to feature bassist Eric Czar and drummer Kenny Kramme, both of whom would remain members of the guitarist and vocalist's backing band for 2003's Blues Deluxe and 2004's Had to Cry Today. The album was initially released on August 13, 2002 by Medalist Entertainment, with reissues following in 2005 from Provogue Records and 2009 from J&R Adventures. The first 25,000 copies of the album were packaged with a two-hour DVD containing footage from Bonamassa's 2001 concert tour in promotion of his debut album A New Day Yesterday, which was later issued separately as A New Day Yesterday Live.

== Reception ==
=== Commercial ===
So, It's Like That debuted at number 2 on the US Billboard Top Blues Albums chart in the week of August 31, 2002, just two years after Bonamassa's debut album A New Day Yesterday had debuted at number 9. The album was Bonamassa's first to top the chart when it reached number 1 later, during run spanning a total of 30 weeks.

=== Critical ===
Professional ratings
Review scores
Source	Rating
AllMusic	2.5/5 stars
The Austin Chronicle	2.5/5 stars
Billboard	Favorable
Guitar World	4/5 stars
Miami New Times	Favorable

Media response to So, It's Like That was mixed. Guitar World magazine awarded the album four out of five stars, with writer Ted Drozdowski describing it as "breathless" and praising Bonamassa's "strong musical personality" and vocal and guitar performances on the album. Billboard magazine's Chuck Taylor praised the album for its range of musical styles, including "down and dirty ... Southern rock paeans" such as "Lie #1" and "Sick in Love", and "melodic triumphs" such as "My Mistake" and "Unbroken". Taylor highlighted Bonamassa's "grimacing lead guitar" and "gruff vocals" throughout the release, concluding that "This is no regular Joe." Miami New Times writer Shawn Bean praised the album's optimistic take on the blues as being "closer to daybreak than midnight in its shade of blue".

AllMusic's Jesse Jarnow was less positive, damning Bonamassa's songwriting and claiming that the album is "filled with subpar tunes bloated with clichés". Jarnow also criticised the performance of Bonamassa's backing band members, which he dubbed "far too generic", and claimed that "Pain and Sorrow" is "the only thing that clearly separates Bonamassa from generic boorishness". Reviewing the album for The Austin Chronicle, Margaret Moser was also critical of So, It's Like That, describing many of its songs as "solid but undistinguished", although praised Bonamassa as "a more than adept multi-instrumentalist" and offered him "extra credit for the heartfelt effort".

== Track listing ==
No.	Title	Writer(s)	Length
1.	"My Mistake"	Joe Bonamassa; Mark Lizotte	4:53
2.	"Lie #1"	Bonamassa; Mike Himelstein	4:22
3.	"No Slack"	Bonamassa; Lizotte	5:05
4.	"Unbroken"	Annie Roboff; Holly Lamar	3:48
5.	"So, It's Like That"	Bonamassa; Himelstein	2:49
6.	"Waiting for Me"	Bonamassa; Richard Feldman; Eric Pressly	3:53
7.	"Never Say Goodbye"	Bonamassa; Curt Schneider	3:32
8.	"Mountain Time"	Bonamassa; Will Jennings	3:41
9.	"Pain and Sorrow"	Bonamassa; Feldman; Pressly	10:36
10.	"Takin' the Hit"	Bonamassa; Himelstein	4:43
11.	"Under the Radar"	Bonamassa; Dave Bassett	3:20
12.	"Sick in Love"	Bonamassa; Himelstein	3:24
13.	"The Hard Way": Hidden track: "Mother Love"	Bonamassa; Bassett; Bonamassa; Feldman	7:48
Total length:			61:54

== Personnel ==
- Joe Bonamassa – guitars (electric, acoustic, slide and baritone), mandolin, vocals
- Eric Czar – bass, fretless bass
- Kenny Kramme – drums
- Clif Magness – organ, piano, programming, percussion, production, engineering, mixing
- Dave Bassett – production, mixing and backing vocals (tracks 11 and 13)
- Matt Chiaravalle – production and engineering (track 3), mixing (tracks 3, 4 and 8)
- Richard Feldman – production ("Mother Love")
- Curt Schneider – mixing (tracks 6 and 7), backing vocals (track 7)
- Matt Wilcox – keyboards (tracks 3 and 4)
- Boshra Alsaadi – backing vocals (track 8)
- Dan Marnien – additional engineering (tracks 11 and 13)
- Doug Messenger – engineering assistance
- Evan Magness – engineering assistance
- Emily Lazar – mastering
- Sarah Register – additional master engineering
- Bryan Rackleff – art direction, design
- MacGregor & Gordon – cover photography
- Cynthia Levine – booklet photography

== Chart positions ==
Chart (2002)	Peak position
US Top Blues Albums (Billboard)	1
