= Carmine Rojas =

American bass guitarist, musical director and composer (born 1953)

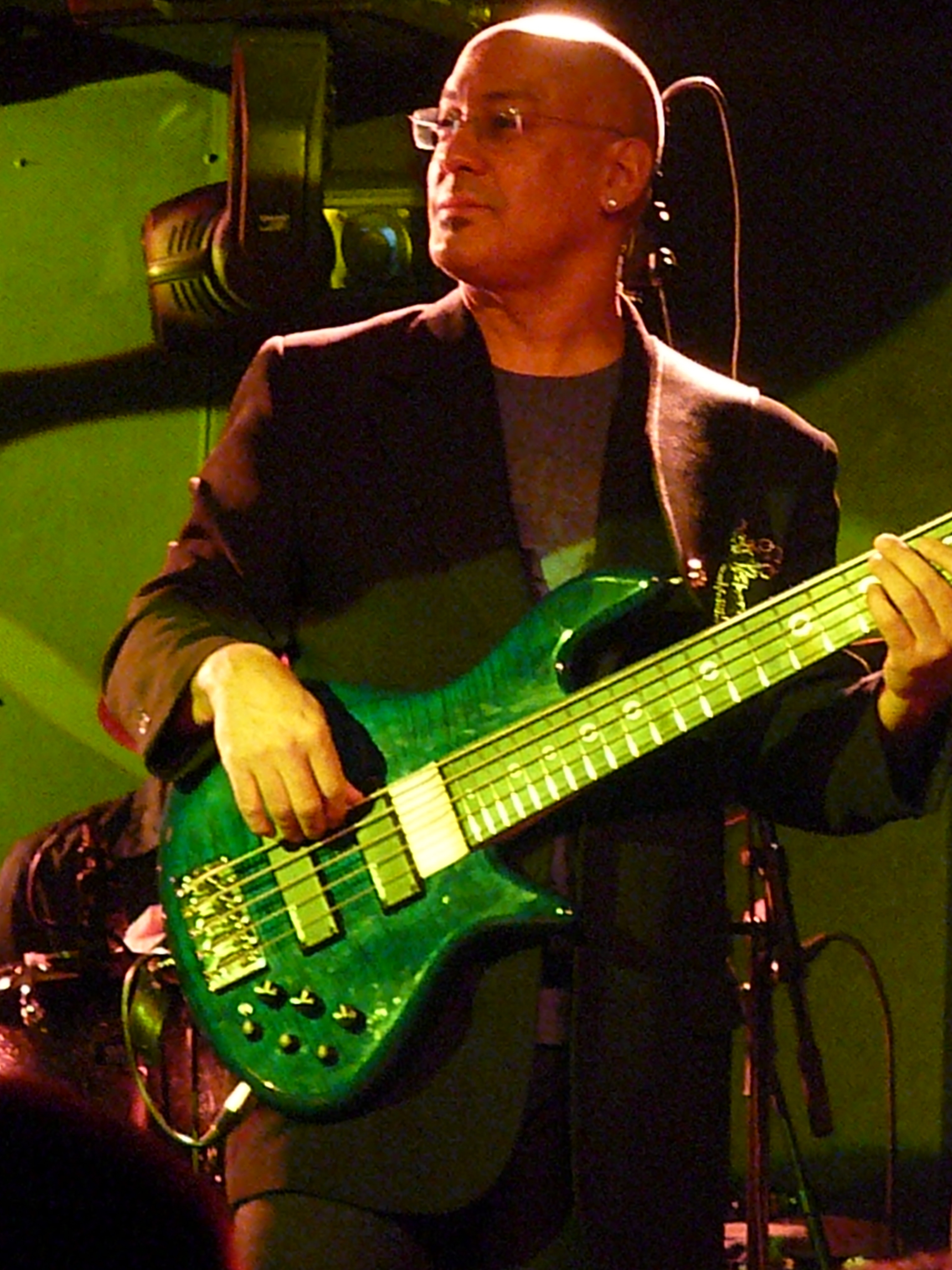
- Carmine Rojas on five-string bass

Background information
- Born: February 14, 1953 (age 73); Brooklyn, New York City, U.S.
- Occupations: Musician, musical director, composer, record producer
- Instruments: Bass, keyboards
- Years active: 1972–present

Carmine Rojas (born February 14, 1953) is an American bass guitarist, musical director and composer. His musical styles include rock, R&B, funk, and jazz.

== Music career ==
=== Early years, as sideman ===
Born in Brooklyn, Rojas toured the world with David Bowie from 1983 through 1987, playing bass on "Let's Dance", "China Girl", "Modern Love" and "Blue Jean". Live DVDs include Serious Moonlight (1983) and Glass Spider (1987).

He recorded and toured with Julian Lennon as a musical director and bassist from 1985–1986.

He recorded and toured with Rod Stewart as a musical director and bass guitarist from 1988 through 2003. One of the multiple albums recorded during that time includes the MTV multi-platinum live CD and DVD, Unplugged...and Seated. He also co-wrote songs on the albums Vagabond Heart and A Spanner in the Works.

Carmine has also recorded, toured and played alongside Tina Turner, Keith Richards, Stevie Wonder, Ron Wood, Stevie Ray Vaughan, B.B. King, Mick Jagger, Eric Clapton, Joe Bonamassa, Eric Johnson, Peter Frampton, Al Green, Carly Simon, Ian Anderson, Paul Rogers, Noel Gallagher, John Waite, Steve Winwood, Billy Joel, Herbie Hancock, Lee Ritenour, Julian Lennon (Musical Director/Bassist), Richie Sambora, Robert Randolph, Joe Don Rooney, Trace Adkins, Nancy Wilson, John Hiatt, Carole King, Beth Hart, Bobby Womack, Sam Moore, Billy Squier, Rob Hyman & Eric Bazilian, Olivia Newton-John, Michael Hutchence, Bernard Fowler, Blondie Chaplin, Billy Gibbons, Leslie West, Joe Lynn Turner, Carlos Santana, Todd Rundgren, Patti LaBelle, Nona Hendryx, Michael Bolton, Ivan Neville, Allen Toussaint, Phil Ramone, Kevin Shirley, Trevor Horn, Charlie Sexton, Jewel, Brandy, Dave Mason, Mike Patton, Glenn Hughes, Nektar, Belouis Some, Tetsuya Komuro, Hitomi, Ziroq, Modern Primitives, Simranking, Sass Jordan, Alphaville and others.

=== Ziroq ===
"Ziroq"
Excerpt of the track "Ziroq" off Ziroq, displaying the use of multiple world styles including flamenco and Middle Eastern percussion.

in 1998, Rojas with Rock / Flamenco guitarist Marcos Nand sang lead vocals in both Spanish and English The both arranging & composing, formed the band Ziroq in Los Angeles. The band blends Spanish, rock, flamenco, and other eastern European influences. In 2001 the band released the full-length album Ziroq. David Beamish of DVDActive praised the "fiery, passionate performances." A review by Mark Schwartz stated, "On their self-titled debut, Middle Eastern percussion, violin, and flamenco guitars take the fore, in counterpoint to Nand's smoky vocals."

In support of the album the band performed throughout the west coast, appearing at the Whole Earth Festival in April 2002. The 2002 Putamayo World Music compilation Regueton, the Ziroq track "Que Peña," peaked at No. 11 on the Tropical/Salsa chart at Billboard.

== Discography ==
With Alphaville

- Afternoons in Utopia (Atlantic Records, 1986)

With Martin Briley

- Dangerous Moments (Mercury Records, 1984)

With Joe Bonamassa

- You & Me (J&R Adventures, 2006)
- Sloe Gin (J&R Adventures, 2007)
- The Ballad of John Henry (J&R Adventures, 2009)
- Black Rock (J&R Adventures, 2010)
- Dust Bowl (J&R Adventures, 2011)
- Driving Towards the Daylight (Provogue Records, 2012)
- Different Shades of Blue (Provogue Records, 2014)

With David Bowie

- Let's Dance (EMI, 1983)
- Tonight (EMI, 1984)
- Never Let Me Down (EMI, 1987)

With Bernard Fowler

- Friends With Privileges (Sony, 2006)

With Beth Hart and Joe Bonamassa

- Don't Explain (J&R Adventures, 2011)
- Seesaw (J&R Adventures, 2013)

With Nona Hendryx

- Nona Hendryx (Epic Records, 1977)
- Nona (RCA Records, 1983)

With Sass Jordan

- Rats (Impact Records, 1994)

With Labelle

- Pressure Cookin' (RCA Records, 1973)
- Phoenix (Epic Records, 1975)
- Chameleon (Epic Records, 1976)

With Julian Lennon

- Valotte (Atlantic Records, 1984)
- The Secret Value of Daydreaming (Atlantic Records, 1986)

With Dave Mason

- 26 Letters - 12 Notes (Sony, 2008)
- Future's Past (Something Music, 2014)

With Ryan McGarvey

- Heavy Hearted (Forward, 2018)

With Charlie Sexton

- Charlie Sexton (MCA Records, 1989)

With Belouis Some

- Some People (Parlophone, 1985)
- Belouis Some (Capitol Records, 1987)

With Billy Squier

- Tell the Truth (Capitol Records, 1993)

With Rod Stewart

- Vagabond Heart (Warner Bros. Records, 1991)
- A Spanner in the Works (Warner Bros. Records, 1995)

With Steve Taylor

- On the Fritz (Sparrow Records, 1985)

With Tina Turner

- Foreign Affair (Capitol Records, 1989)

With John Waite

- Mask of Smiles (EMI, 1985)
