= Blues Deluxe =

Studio album by Joe Bonamassa
- Released: August 26, 2003
- Recorded: May – June 2003
- Studio: Unique (New York City)
- Genre: Blues rock; hard rock
- Length: 51:22
- Label: Medalist
- Producer: Bob Held

Joe Bonamassa chronology
So, It's Like That (2002)	Blues Deluxe (2003)	Had to Cry Today (2004)

Blues Deluxe is the third studio album by American blues-rock musician Joe Bonamassa. Recorded at Unique Recording Studios in New York City.

It was produced by Bob Held and features nine cover versions of songs by classic blues artists and three original tracks (two co-written by Mike Himelstein, one by Will Jennings). The album was released on August 26, 2003, by Medalist Entertainment and reached number 8 on the US Billboard Top Blues Albums chart.

Named after the song of the same name by The Jeff Beck Group, a recording of which is featured on the album, Blues Deluxe was reportedly not originally intended to serve as Bonamassa's third album, but was ultimately deemed to be of high enough quality for release. The album received generally positive reviews from critics, with commentators praising Bonamassa's renditions of several blues standards, as well as the quality of his three original compositions on the album.

== Background and release ==
Joe Bonamassa recorded Blues Deluxe at Unique Recording Studios in New York City with producer Bob Held and engineer Gary Tole. Recording began in May 2003 and was completed by June. Following the conclusion of the touring cycle in promotion of his 2002 release So, It's Like That, Bonamassa recorded a number of blues songs to "blow off some steam", after his performances of such tracks were well received by live audiences. According to the album's press release, "The resulting masters were so compelling that Bonamassa and his label decided to finish the record and release Blues Deluxe". The album features nine cover versions and only three original tracks – "I Don't Live Anywhere", "Mumbling Word" (both co-written by Mike Himelstein) and "Woke Up Dreaming" (co-written by Will Jennings). Due to its abundance of blues covers, Brian Reiser of record label J&R Adventures suggested that "Blues Deluxe is Joe's way of asserting that he above all else is a bluesman", describing it as "a return to Joe's deepest blues roots". The album is named after the song "Blues Deluxe" by The Jeff Beck Group, a cover of which is featured on the release.

== Reception ==
=== Commercial ===
Blues Deluxe debuted on the US Billboard Blues Albums chart at number 8, its peak position, for the week of September 13, 2003. It spent a total of eight weeks on the chart, and is Bonamassa's latest release (and only release, besides his 2000 debut studio album A New Day Yesterday) to not reach the top five of the chart.

=== Critical ===
Professional ratings
Review scores
Source	Rating
AllMusic	3/5 stars
Vintage Guitar	Favorable

Media response to Blues Deluxe was generally positive. Writing for AllMusic, Mark Keresman praised Bonamassa's "fierce, scorching guitar" as the highlight of the album, adding that "If axemen such as Peter Green, Rory Gallagher, and Buddy Guy are your cup of tea, this Deluxe item is a necessity." Vintage Guitar magazine's Dave Hussong hailed Blues Deluxe as "One of the best "traditional" blues releases from late in the Year of the Blues", praising Bonamassa's "diversity" and praising him as "bordering on peerless". Blues magazine's Ed Mitchell named the guitar solo in the album's title track as one of Bonamassa's ten best in a 2015 feature, outlining that "There's a stripped down Chicago blues club vibe to this one. Shredding his lungs on one of his best early vocals, Bonamassa references Stevie Ray Vaughan and Albert King in his guitar solo, while adding flavour with variations in reverb, delay and shuddering overdrive."

== Track listing ==
No.	Title	Writer(s)	Length
1.	"You Upset Me Baby" (B.B. King cover)	B.B. King; Joe Bihari	3:35
2.	"Burning Hell" (John Lee Hooker cover)	John Lee Hooker; Bernard Bersman	6:50
3.	"Blues Deluxe" (The Jeff Beck Group cover)	Jeff Beck; Rod Stewart	7:20
4.	"Man of Many Words" (Buddy Guy cover)	Buddy Guy	4:11
5.	"Woke Up Dreaming"	Joe Bonamassa; Will Jennings	2:51
6.	"I Don't Live Anywhere"	Bonamassa; Mike Himelstein	3:42
7.	"Wild About You Baby" (Elmore James cover)	Elmore James	3:39
8.	"Long Distance Blues" (T-Bone Walker cover)	Bernice Carter	3:53
9.	"Pack It Up" (Freddie King cover)	George Chandler; Gonzalez	4:04
10.	"Left Overs" (Albert Collins cover)	Albert Collins	3:22
11.	"Walking Blues" (Robert Johnson cover)	Robert Johnson	4:27
12.	"Mumbling Word"	Bonamassa; Himelstein	3:28
Total length:			51:22

== Personnel ==
- Joe Bonamassa – guitar, vocals
- Eric Czar – bass
- Kenny Kramme – drums
- Benny Harrison – organ
- Jon Paris – harmonica
- Bob Held – production
- Gary Tole – engineering, mixing
- Bradford Lee Parks – engineering assistance
- Scott Hull – mastering
- Jon Bomser – art direction, design
- Bari Rosenow – art direction

== Chart positions ==
Chart (2003)	Peak position
US Top Blues Albums (Billboard)	8
