= Prelude to the Millennium =

Prelude To The Millennium

Compilation album by Symphony X
- Released: February 2, 1999
- Recorded: 1994–1998
- Genre: Progressive metal, neoclassical metal
- Length: 76:38
- Label: Inside Out
- Producer: Steve Evetts, Michael Romeo, Eric Rachel

Professional ratings
Review scores
Source	Rating
AllMusic link	3/5 stars

Prelude to the Millennium: Essentials of Symphony is a compilation album by progressive metal band Symphony X, released in 1999. It features selections from their first four studio albums, although no original versions from their debut album Symphony X are included. Instead, the album starts with a fully re-recorded version of "Masquerade" that features Russell Allen on vocals.

== Track listing ==
1. "Masquerade '98" – 6:02 - new vocals recorded by Russell Allen - original version is found on Symphony X
2. "A Winter's Dream" - Prelude (Part I) – 3:03 - from The Damnation Game
3. "The Damnation Game" – 4:32 - from The Damnation Game
4. "Dressed to Kill" – 4:44 - from The Damnation Game
5. "Of Sins and Shadows" – 4:56 - from The Divine Wings of Tragedy
6. "Sea of Lies" – 4:18 - from The Divine Wings of Tragedy
7. "Out of the Ashes" – 3:39 - from The Divine Wings of Tragedy
8. "The Divine Wings of Tragedy" – 20:41 - from The Divine Wings of Tragedy
9. "Candlelight Fantasia" – 6:42 - from The Divine Wings of Tragedy
10. "Smoke and Mirrors" – 6:12 - from Twilight in Olympus
11. "Through the Looking Glass (Part I, II, III)" – 13:04 - from Twilight in Olympus

== Personnel ==
- Russell Allen - vocals
- Michael Romeo - guitars
- Michael Pinnella - keyboards
- Thomas Miller - bass
- Jason Rullo - drums (tracks 1–9)
- Tom Walling - drums (tracks 10, 11)
