= Twilight in Olympus =

Studio album by Symphony X
- Released: March 13, 1998
- Studio: Trax East Recording Studio in South River, New Jersey; The Dungeon
- Genre: Progressive metal; power metal; neoclassical metal
- Length: 52:40
- Label: Zero Corporation
- Producer: Michael Romeo, Steve Evetts, Eric Rachel

Symphony X chronology
The Divine Wings of Tragedy (1996)	Twilight in Olympus (1998)	V: The New Mythology Suite (2000)

Twilight in Olympus is the fourth studio album by American progressive metal band Symphony X, released in 1998 through Zero Corporation (Japan) and Inside Out Music (Europe); a remastered special edition was reissued on January 13, 2004 through Inside Out. The album features drums played by Thomas Walling, who filled in for regular drummer Jason Rullo after he temporarily left the band for personal reasons. It is also the last Symphony X album with longtime bassist Thomas Miller, who left the band during the album's tour.

== Overview ==
To date, Twilight in Olympus is one of only two Symphony X albums with no title track; the other being their self-titled debut. Instead, the unfinished compositions from these sessions which would have formed the title track were later reworked and distributed in fragments throughout V: The New Mythology Suite (2000), particularly on the final track "Rediscovery (Part II) - The New Mythology". Guitarist Michael Romeo has since confirmed this: "About half of ["Rediscovery (Part II)"] is the song 'Twilight in Olympus', maybe a little more".

As of 2014, all songs from the album have been performed live, except for "The Relic" and "Orion - The Hunter". "Smoke and Mirrors" has endured as a mainstay on the band's setlist since the album's release, and is included on their 2001 live release Live on the Edge of Forever, along with "Church of the Machine" and "Through the Looking Glass".

== Musical and lyrical references ==
"Smoke and Mirrors" cites Johann Sebastian Bach's Mass in B Minor (Kyrie eleison) (1749) in the instrumental interlude after the second chorus.

"Sonata" contains parts of the second movement of Ludwig van Beethoven's Piano Sonata No. 8 (Pathétique) (1799).

"Through the Looking Glass" is based on Lewis Carroll's novel Through the Looking-Glass (1871), the sequel to Alice's Adventures in Wonderland (1865).

"Orion - The Hunter" contains lyrics from "The Raging Season", from Symphony X's self-titled debut album (1994).

"Lady of the Snow", according to bassist Thomas Miller, was inspired by the popular Japanese mythological figure Yuki-onna. According to Michael Romeo, "The band was looking for a musical and lyrical theme to represent tonalities and scale ideas for a new song, and Tom [Miller] suggested the Lady of the Snow story, [so] the music was written to reflect the lyrics."

== Critical reception ==
Professional ratings
Review scores
Source	Rating
AllMusic	3/5 stars
The Metal Crypt	4.43/5 stars

Robert Taylor at AllMusic gave Twilight in Olympus three stars out of five, saying that "The band is as tight as ever and their sound is still predominantly neo-classical, but there is more diversity and originality here than ever before." Praise was given to Michael Romeo for establishing a unique guitar tone, strong sense of rhythm and memorable riffs. "Through the Looking Glass" was likened favorably to "The Divine Wings of Tragedy" from the band's 1997 album of the same name, while "Sonata" and "Lady of the Snow" were also listed as highlights.

== Track listing ==
No.	Title	Lyrics	Music	Length
1.	"Smoke and Mirrors"	Michael Romeo, Russell Allen, Thomas Miller	Romeo, Miller	6:08
2.	"Church of the Machine"	Symphony X	Symphony X	8:57
3.	"Sonata"	(instrumental)	Ludwig van Beethoven, Romeo	1:25
4.	"In the Dragon's Den"	Symphony X	Romeo, Miller, Michael Pinnella	3:58
5.	"Through the Looking Glass": "Part I"; "Part II"; "Part III"	Miller, Romeo	Romeo, Pinnella, Miller	13:06
6.	"The Relic"	Allen, Miller	Romeo, Pinnella, Miller	5:03
7.	"Orion - The Hunter"	Miller, Allen	Romeo, Miller	6:56
8.	"Lady of the Snow"	Miller, Allen	Romeo, Pinnella	7:07
Total length:				52:40

== Personnel ==
- Russell Allen – lead vocals, producer
- Michael Romeo – guitar, sitar, mini-harp, background vocals
- Michael Pinnella – keyboard, background vocals, "knives and chainsaw juggling"
- Thomas Walling – drums
- Thomas Miller – bass, background vocals

Technical personnel

- Steve Evetts – producer
- Eric Rachel – producer
- Daniel Muro – artwork
