= Iconoclast (Symphony X album) =

Studio album by Symphony X
- Released: June 17, 2011
- Recorded: September 2010 – January 2011
- Studio: The Dungeon
- Genres: Progressive metal; neoclassical metal; power metal; symphonic metal
- Length: 63:10; 82:43 (Special Edition)
- Label: Nuclear Blast
- Producer: Michael Romeo

Symphony X chronology
Paradise Lost (2007)	Iconoclast (2011)	Underworld (2015)

Iconoclast is the eighth studio album by American progressive metal band Symphony X, released in June 2011.

== Theme ==
When interviewed, vocalist Russell Allen said that the lyrical concept of the album is based on "The idea of machines taking over everything, and all this technology we put our society into pretty much being our demise." Allen said on Heavy Metal Thunder that "it isn't a story, but rather a theme, like Dark Side of the Moon by Pink Floyd."

== Album art ==
Illustrator and film concept artist Warren Flanagan (Watchmen, The Incredible Hulk, 2012), who designed the cover of Paradise Lost, returned as art director for Iconoclast. Sharing his creative process on the album's artwork: "The idea was to create imagery that was a little darker in tone to previous Symphony X albums and to represent the overall theme of Iconoclast into the artwork. The whole concept came from Michael Romeo, who had a strong idea of what the cover should represent based on the music. I just ran with it. When the album's title was decided on, I focused the image based on the meaning of it. I also wanted to use the band's signature 'masks' but present them in a way that connected to the new album."

== Reception ==
Professional ratings
Review scores
Source	Rating
AllMusic	5/5 stars
Jukebox:Metal	3/5 stars
Metal Assault	4.5/5 stars
Metal Storm	4.5/5 stars
Metal Temple	5/5 stars
Metalholic	9.5/10 stars
Prog Sphere	3/5 stars
Thrash Hits	5/6 stars

Iconoclast debuted at number 76 on the Billboard 200 album chart in the United States, selling more than 7,300 copies in its first week. The record also debuted at number 7 on the Top Hard Rock Chart, number 19 on the Top Rock Chart and number 13 on the Top Independent Chart. The album showcases the highest chart position and the most first-week sales in the band's history.

== Track listing ==
=== Regular edition ===
All lyrics are written by Russell Allen and Michael Romeo, except where noted; all music is composed by Romeo.

No.	Title	Length
1.	"Iconoclast"	10:53
2.	"The End of Innocence"	5:29
3.	"Dehumanized"	6:49
4.	"Bastards of the Machine"	4:58
5.	"Heretic"	6:26
6.	"Children of a Faceless God"	6:22
7.	"Electric Messiah" (lyrics: Allen)	6:15
8.	"Prometheus (I Am Alive)"	6:48
9.	"When All Is Lost"	9:10
Total length:		63:10

=== Special edition ===
==== Disc one ====
All lyrics are written by Russell Allen and Michael Romeo; all music is composed by Romeo.

No.	Title	Length
1.	"Iconoclast"	10:51
2.	"The End of Innocence"	5:27
3.	"Dehumanized"	6:47
4.	"Bastards of the Machine"	4:56
5.	"Heretic"	6:24
6.	"Children of a Faceless God"	6:20
7.	"When All Is Lost"	9:10
Total length:		49:55

==== Disc two ====
All lyrics are written by Russell Allen and Michael Romeo, except where noted; all music is composed by Romeo.

No.	Title	Lyrics	Length
1.	"Electric Messiah"	Allen	6:13
2.	"Prometheus (I Am Alive)"	Allen, Romeo	6:46
3.	"Light Up the Night"	Allen	5:03
4.	"The Lords of Chaos"	Allen	6:09
5.	"Reign in Madness"	Allen, Romeo	8:37
Total length:			32:48

== Personnel ==
- Russell Allen – vocals
- Michael Romeo – guitar
- Michael Pinnella – keyboards
- Michael LePond – bass
- Jason Rullo – drums

Technical personnel

- Michael Romeo – production, recording and engineering
- Jens Bogren – mixing and mastering
- Warren Flanagan – artwork
