= War of the Worlds, Pt. 1 =

Studio album by Michael Romeo
- Released: July 27, 2018
- Recorded: 2017–2018 at The Dungeon in Hazlet, New Jersey
- Genre: Progressive metal; neoclassical metal; symphonic metal; power metal
- Length: 53:00
- Label: Mascot Label Group
- Producer: Michael Romeo

Michael Romeo chronology
The Dark Chapter (1994)	War of the Worlds, Pt. 1 (2018)	War of the Worlds, Pt. 2 (2022)

War of the Worlds, Pt. 1 is the second solo album by Symphony X guitarist Michael Romeo, released on 27 July 2018. It is his first solo album in over two decades (since 1994's The Dark Chapter) and his first release since 2015's Underworld with Symphony X.

The album is inspired by the homonymous novel by H. G. Wells and incorporates elements of classical music, inspired by movie score composers such as Bernard Herrmann and John Williams. Most of it was created when Symphony X's vocalist Russell Allen was still recovering from the road accident he suffered one year before while on tour with Adrenaline Mob (in which his bandmate David Zablidowsky and tour manager Jane Train died) and the other members were involved with other projects. Michael hired three musicians he's known for a while, including bassist John DeServio, with whom he went to high school.

Two lyric videos, one for "Djinn" and another for "Fear the Unknown", were released on 29 June and 18 July, respectively. According to Romeo, a sequel, War of the Worlds, Pt. 2, is already at the final stages of recording, but will take a while to be released because he wants people "to absorb the first one for a while, and then we'll put out the second record. They'll complement each other, but they'll also be a bit different". It was released on March 25, 2022.

== Track listing ==
All lyrics are written by Michael Romeo and Rick Castellano, except "F*cking Robots", written solely by Castellano, and "Introduction" and "War Machine", which are instrumentals; all music is composed by Romeo.

No.	Title	Length
1.	"Introduction"	3:41
2.	"Fear the Unknown"	4:20
3.	"Black"	6:18
4.	"F*cking Robots"	4:29
5.	"Djinn"	7:28
6.	"Believe"	8:22
7.	"Differences"	4:32
8.	"War Machine"	3:10
9.	"Oblivion"	5:06
10.	"Constellations"	5:34
Total length:		53:00

== Personnel ==
- Rick Castellano – vocals
- Michael Romeo – guitars, keyboards, orchestrations
- John DeServio – bass guitar
- John Macaluso – drums

== Charts ==
Chart (2018)	Peak position
Belgian Albums (Ultratop Wallonia)	129
German Albums (Offizielle Top 100)	97
Swiss Albums (Schweizer Hitparade)	27
US Heatseekers Albums (Billboard)	8
