= Paradise Lost (Symphony X album) =

Studio album by Symphony X
- Released: June 26, 2007
- Recorded: 2006 – 2007
- Studio: The Dungeon
- Genre: Progressive metal; power metal; neoclassical metal; symphonic metal
- Length: 61:00
- Label: Inside Out
- Producer: Michael Romeo

Symphony X chronology
The Odyssey (2002)	Paradise Lost (2007)	Iconoclast (2011)

Professional ratings
Review scores
Source	Rating
AllMusic	4/5 stars

Paradise Lost is the seventh studio album by American progressive metal band Symphony X, released on June 26, 2007 through Inside Out Music. It is a concept album loosely inspired by John Milton's 1667 epic poem Paradise Lost. The album was the band's first to chart on the U.S. Billboard 200, reaching No. 123 and remaining on that chart for a week, as well as reaching No. 1 on Billboard's Heatseekers and the top 100 in five other countries.

== Overview ==
=== Style ===
The album's release had been delayed numerous times since the announcement on November 16, 2005 that the band was going to "start pulling it all together". In a fan club chat on March 18, 2006, guitarist and main songwriter Michael Romeo said that the album will be "a bit darker—the direction is still the same—for the most part", and went on to say that "the classical stuff was getting to a point where we need to evolve the music a bit. There is still a lot of classic influence in there—not as obvious as '[Out of the] Ashes', say". He went on to suggest that there may be a song or songs on the album themed around the works of H. P. Lovecraft, and that there would be "A big tune on here ... Paradise Lost is the theme as of now", lending rumor to the title of the album.

In August 2006, some preliminary cover art was leaked on the internet, confirming suspicions that the title of the album would be the same as the song "Paradise Lost". This leaked album art, which was initially categorized by the band as only "preliminary" artwork, was later revealed to be the official artwork, with the full panorama (including the back cover) being made available on the official Symphony X website on May 12, 2007.

=== Release ===
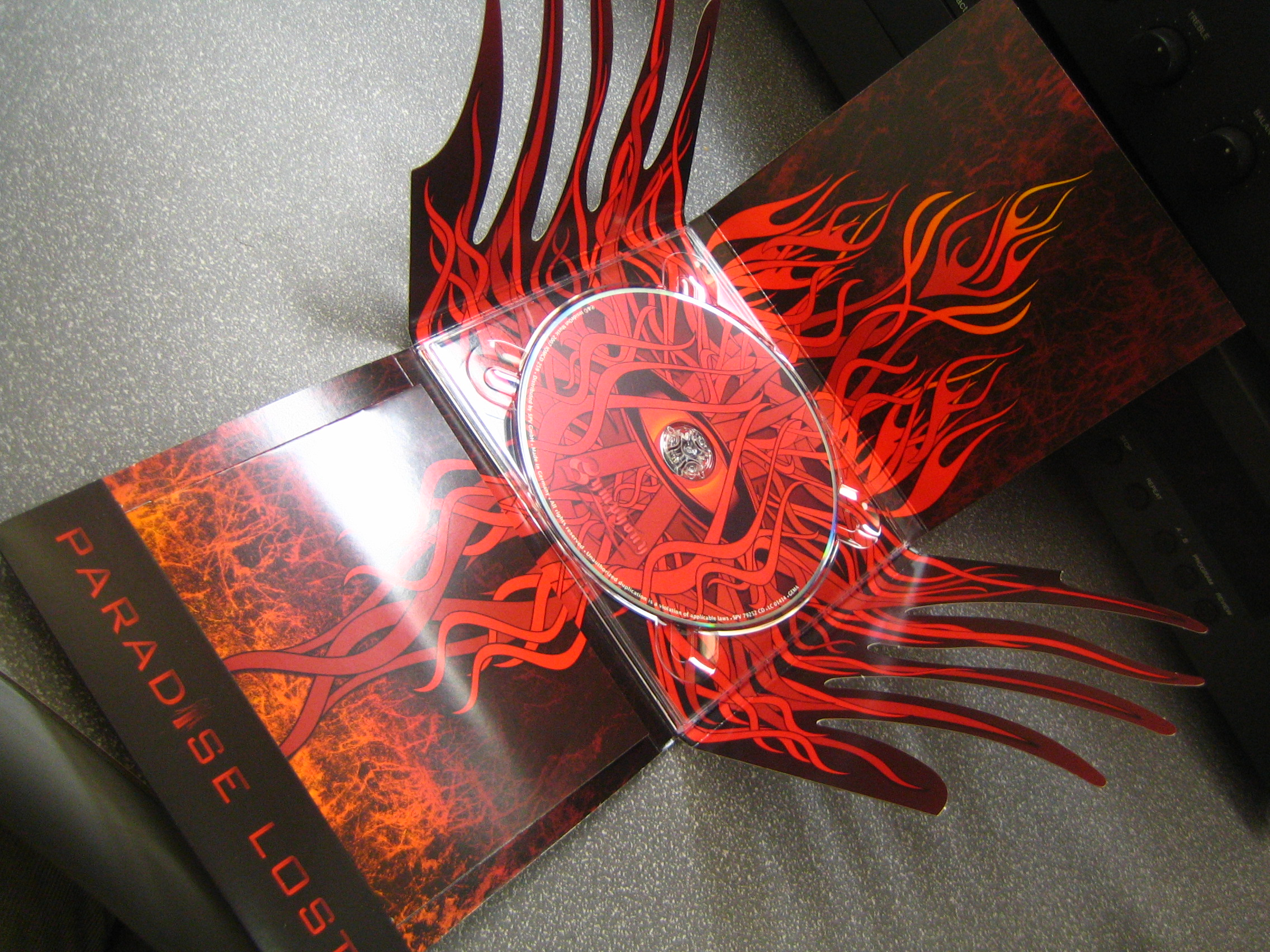
Digipak CD edition packaging.

At one point it was announced that the album would be released in late 2006, but the date was pushed back several times before its final release date of June 26, 2007. On May 12, 2007, "Serpent's Kiss" was made available on the band's Myspace profile. MP3 samples of other tracks from the album were also made available on German record label SPV's website. In addition to the standard jewel case edition, the album was released in two other formats: a special edition with Digipak packaging, which includes a DVD containing 5.1 audio and music videos for "Serpent's Kiss" and "Set the World on Fire"; secondly, a limited edition including a DVD of footage shot by the band throughout its history (a first for the band), available exclusively in f.y.e. stores. The first 500 copies pre-ordered from New England-based music retailer Newbury Comics included a signed CD booklet.

== Track listing ==
All lyrics are written by Russell Allen and Michael Romeo, except where noted; all music is composed by Romeo, except where noted.

No.	Title	Length
1.	"Oculus Ex Inferni" (instrumental; orchestration: Romeo)	2:34
2.	"Set the World on Fire (The Lie of Lies)"	5:55
3.	"Domination"	6:29
4.	"Serpent's Kiss"	5:03
5.	"Paradise Lost" (music: Romeo, Michael Pinnella)	6:32
6.	"Eve of Seduction"	5:04
7.	"The Walls of Babylon"	8:16
8.	"Seven"	7:01
9.	"The Sacrifice" (lyrics: Allen)	4:49
10.	"Revelation (Divus Pennae Ex Tragoedia)"	9:17
Total length:		61:00

== Personnel ==
- Russell Allen – vocals
- Michael Romeo – guitar, orchestral keyboard
- Michael Pinnella – keyboard
- Jason Rullo – drums
- Michael LePond – bass

Technical personnel

- Michael Romeo – programming, engineering, production
- Jens Bogren – mixing
- Thomas Eberger – mastering
- Warren Flanagan – artwork

== Chart performance ==
Year	Chart	Position
2007	Billboard Heatseekers	1
2007	Billboard Independent Albums	12
2007	Swedish albums chart	39
2007	German albums chart	50
2007	Dutch albums chart	59
2007	French albums chart	60
2007	Swiss albums chart	61
2007	Billboard 200	123
2007	Billboard Top Internet Albums	123
