= The Odyssey (album) =

Studio album by Symphony X
- Released: November 5, 2002
- Studio: The Dungeon
- Genre: Progressive metal; power metal; neoclassical metal
- Length: 66:52
- Label: Inside Out
- Producer: Michael Romeo

Symphony X chronology
Live on the Edge of Forever (2001)	The Odyssey (2002)	Paradise Lost (2007)

The Odyssey is the sixth studio album by American progressive metal band Symphony X, released on November 5, 2002 through Inside Out Music. The album is the band's first to be recorded entirely at guitarist Michael Romeo's home studio, The Dungeon. "Accolade II" is a sequel to "The Accolade" from The Divine Wings of Tragedy (1996). The title track is the album's grand finale: a 24-minute musical interpretation of Homer's Odyssey, an epic poem about the journey of ancient Greek hero Odysseus.

== Critical reception ==
Professional ratings
Review scores
Source	Rating
AllMusic	3/5 stars
The Metal Crypt	4.37/5 stars
Metal Storm	9/10

Alex Henderson at AllMusic gave The Odyssey three stars out of five, calling it an "old-school" album and "dated" for its time, while clarifying that "dated isn't necessarily a bad thing—if you hold a particular era in high regard, dated can actually be a plus." He also likened the mythical and fantasy elements to classic heavy metal acts such as Queensrÿche, Yngwie Malmsteen, Ronnie James Dio, Iron Maiden and Metallica.

Loudwire named the album in fifth in the list "Top 25 Power Metal Albums of All Time" and Metal Hammer ranked it at #19 in a similar list.

== Track listing ==
No.	Title	Lyrics	Music	Length
1.	"Inferno (Unleash the Fire)"	Russell Allen, Michael Romeo	Romeo	5:32
2.	"Wicked"	Allen	Romeo	5:32
3.	"Incantations of the Apprentice"	Allen	Romeo	4:22
4.	"Accolade II"	Allen	Romeo, Michael Pinnella, Michael LePond	7:53
5.	"King of Terrors"	Allen, Romeo, Jason Rullo	Romeo, Pinnella	6:19
6.	"The Turning"	Allen, Romeo	Romeo, LePond	4:44
7.	"Awakenings"	Allen, Romeo	Romeo, Pinnella, LePond	8:21
8.	"The Odyssey": "Part I - Odysseus' Theme / Overture"; "Part II - Journey to Ithaca"; "Part III - The Eye"; "Part IV - Circe (Daughter of the Sun)"; "Part V - Sirens"; "Part VI - Scylla and Charybdis; a) Gulf of Doom; b) Drifting Home"; "Part VII - The Fate of the Suitors / Champion of Ithaca"	.: (instrumental); Allen, Romeo; Romeo; Romeo; Romeo; (instrumental); LePond, Romeo	.: Romeo; Romeo; Romeo; Romeo; Romeo; Romeo; Romeo	24:09
Total length:				66:52

Japanese/limited edition bonus tracks
No.	Title	Lyrics	Music	Length
9.	"Masquerade '98"	Romeo, Pinnella, Thomas Miller, Rullo, Rod Tyler	Romeo, Pinnella, Miller, Rullo, Tyler	6:00
10.	"Frontiers"	Allen	Romeo, LePond, Pinnella, Rullo	4:50

== Personnel ==
- Russell Allen – vocals
- Michael Romeo – guitar, orchestral keyboard
- Michael Pinnella – keyboard, piano
- Jason Rullo – drums
- Michael LePond – bass

Technical personnel

- Michael Romeo – programming, engineering, mixing, production
- Steve Evetts – mixing, production
- Peter van 't Riet – mastering
- Tom Thiel, Illuvision – artwork
