= V – The New Mythology Suite =

V: The New Mythology Suite

Studio album by Symphony X
- Released: October 10, 2000
- Studio: Trax East Recording Studio in South River, New Jersey; Mix-O-Lydian Recording Studio in Lafayette Township, New Jersey; The Dungeon
- Genre: Progressive metal; power metal; neoclassical metal; symphonic metal
- Length: 62:41
- Label: Inside Out
- Producer: Michael Romeo, Eric Rachel

Symphony X chronology
Twilight in Olympus (1998)	V: The New Mythology Suite (2000)	Live on the Edge of Forever (2001)

V: The New Mythology Suite is the fifth studio album by American progressive metal band Symphony X, released on October 10, 2000, through Inside Out Music. It is a concept album and rock opera based on the beliefs and writings of Edgar Cayce, and deals with the story of Atlantis, ancient Egyptian mythology, and astrology. The album is the band's first to feature its current and longest lineup, following the arrival of bassist Michael LePond and the return of drummer Jason Rullo.

== Overview ==
As well as being a heavier continuation of the band's established progressive metal style, V also includes a multitude of excerpts from classical composers, including Giuseppe Verdi's Messa da Requiem; Wolfgang Amadeus Mozart's Requiem Mass in D minor; Johann Sebastian Bach's Concerto for Harpsichord in D minor, BWV 1052 and Cantata No. 188; and Béla Bartók's Concerto for Orchestra, Sz. 116, BB 123.

Symphony X's 1998 album Twilight in Olympus was released without a title track; instead, the unfinished compositions from those sessions were later re-worked and distributed in fragments throughout V, particularly on the final track, "Rediscovery (Part II) - The New Mythology". Guitarist Michael Romeo has since confirmed this: "About half of ['Rediscovery (Part II)'] is the song 'Twilight in Olympus', maybe a little more".

The narrative of the album is primarily inspired by the alleged clairvoyant visions of American mystic Edgar Cayce, and by extension ideas about Atlantis popular among 19th and 20th century occult groups such as Theosophists. It concerns an ancient extraterrestrial civilization of incarnate spiritual beings, the Atlanteans, and a race of demonic creatures mistakenly created by them, the Children of Belial, which represent archetypes of good and evil within humanity respectively. Atlantis is destroyed in the conflict between the two, but the leaders of both groups and the messiah child Ma'at (representing balance) find their way to Egypt, where they impart spiritual wisdom to mankind. The murder of Ma’at by the leader of the Children of Belial, Montu-Sekhmet, ensures that evil is the prevailing force within mankind, causing all of the strife throughout human history. Hope lies only in a prophecy foretold by Ma'at of a future planetary alignment through which balance can be restored.

== Critical reception ==
Professional ratings
Review scores
Source	Rating
AllMusic	3/5 stars

Robert Taylor at AllMusic awarded V: The New Mythology Suite three stars out of five, saying "As a whole, V: The New Mythology Suite works and proves that Symphony X has chosen to expand, rather than repeat, history in a genre that appeared to have peaked both creatively and technically." Particular attention was drawn to Romeo's guitar playing style, with Taylor likening it to that of Yngwie Malmsteen, but remarking that it "has proved to be both a blessing and a curse for this gifted guitarist. His chops are certainly comparable, but his sound and style are often identical to his idol." He also criticized some of the music and themes as being "all too familiar", as well as singer Russell Allen's "macho vocal style."

Thom Jurek, also at AllMusic, called it "a solid meld of prog, power, and neoclassical metal that continually pushed their envelope of embracing and employing expert songwriting, arranging, and production techniques."

In 2016, Classic Rock named V in its list "10 Essential Progressive Metal Albums." Metal Hammer also named it on its list of "The 10 Essential Symphonic Metal Albums."

== Track listing ==
No.	Title	Lyrics	Music	Length
1.	"Prelude"			1:07
2.	"Evolution (The Grand Design)"	Michael Romeo, Russell Allen, Jason Rullo	Romeo, Michael Pinnella	5:20
3.	"Fallen"	Romeo, Allen, Rullo	Romeo, Pinnella, Michael LePond, Rullo	5:51
4.	"Transcendence (Segue)"	(instrumental)	Romeo	0:38
5.	"Communion and the Oracle"	Romeo, Rullo	Romeo, Pinnella	7:45
6.	"The Bird-Serpent War/Cataclysm"	Romeo, Pinnella	Romeo, Pinnella	4:02
7.	"On the Breath of Poseidon (Segue)"	(instrumental)	Romeo	3:01
8.	"Egypt"	Romeo, Allen, Rullo	Romeo, Pinnella, LePond	7:04
9.	"The Death of Balance/Lacrymosa"	(instrumental)	Romeo, Rullo	3:42
10.	"Absence of Light"	Romeo, Allen	Romeo, Pinnella	4:58
11.	"A Fool's Paradise"	Allen, Pinnella	Romeo, Pinnella	5:48
12.	"Rediscovery (Segue)"	(instrumental)	Romeo, Pinnella	1:24
13.	"Rediscovery (Part II) - The New Mythology"	Romeo, Pinnella, Allen	Romeo, Pinnella, Rullo	12:01
Total length:				62:41

== Personnel ==
- Russell Allen – lead vocals
- Michael Romeo – guitar, background vocals
- Michael Pinnella – keyboard, background vocals
- Jason Rullo – drums, percussion
- Michael LePond – bass

Technical personnel

- Michael Romeo – orchestral arrangement, engineering, producer
- Michael Pinnella – orchestral arrangement
- Eric Rachel – engineering, production
- Alan Douches – mastering
- Kazuo Hakamada – artwork
