= Live on the Edge of Forever =

Live album by Symphony X
- Released: November 13, 2001
- Recorded: October, 2000; June, 2001
- Venues: Élysée Montmartre, Paris
- Genres: Progressive metal, neoclassical metal, power metal, symphonic metal
- Length: 106:02
- Label: Inside Out

Symphony X chronology
V – The New Mythology Suite (2000)	Live on the Edge of Forever (2001)	The Odyssey (2002)

Professional ratings
Review scores
Source	Rating
AllMusic link	2.5/5 stars

Live on the Edge of Forever is the first and only live album by progressive metal band Symphony X, which was recorded in Élysée Montmartre, Paris during their European tour in 2000, and released in 2001.

The album starts like their previous studio effort V – The New Mythology Suite, but whereas "The Death of Balance" normally segues into "Lacrymosa," it now segues into "Candlelight Fantasia" from The Divine Wings of Tragedy album. Many classics are eventually played, including the neoclassical "Smoke and Mirrors" and the epic "The Divine Wings of Tragedy." No tracks from the first two albums are performed, even though the album's title references a track from The Damnation Game.

== Track listing ==
=== Disc one ===
1. "Prelude" – 1:38
2. "Evolution (The Grand Design)" – 5:18
3. "Fallen / Transcendence (Segue)" – 6:31
4. "Communion and the Oracle" – 7:39
5. "The Bird-Serpent War" – 3:40
6. "On the Breath of Poseidon (Segue)" – 5:10
7. "Egypt" – 7:05
8. "The Death of Balance / Candlelight Fantasia" – 5:53
9. "The Eyes of Medusa" – 4:32

=== Disc two ===
1. "Smoke and Mirrors" – 6:35
2. "Church of the Machine" – 7:22
3. "Through the Looking Glass" – 14:09
4. "Of Sins and Shadows" – 7:23
5. "Sea of Lies" – 4:05
6. "The Divine Wings of Tragedy" – 19:55

== Differences from studio versions ==
- The openings of "Church of the Machine" and "The Divine Wings of Tragedy" are omitted.
- "Through the Looking Glass" features an extended middle section.
- Most notably on the tracks from V – The New Mythology Suite, parts that were originally played on keyboards are played on guitar and bass.
- The ending of Rush's "YYZ" is played at the end of "The Divine Wings of Tragedy."

== Personnel ==
- Russell Allen - vocals
- Michael Romeo - guitar
- Michael Pinnella - keyboards
- Michael LePond - bass
- Jason Rullo - drums
