= Underworld (Symphony X album) =

Studio album by Symphony X
- Released: July 24, 2015
- Recorded: September 2014–January 2015
- Studio: The Dungeon
- Genre: Progressive metal; neoclassical metal; power metal; symphonic metal
- Length: 63:57
- Label: Nuclear Blast
- Producer: Michael Romeo

Symphony X chronology
Iconoclast (2011)	Underworld (2015)

Singles from Underworld
- 1. "Nevermore" Released: July 22, 2015; 2. "Without You" Released: July 22, 2015

Professional ratings
Review scores
Source	Rating
AllMusic	4/5 stars

Underworld is the ninth studio album by American progressive metal band Symphony X. It was released on July 24, 2015 through Nuclear Blast, and released in Japan on August 24. The album's first single, "Nevermore", premiered on May 22, 2015, followed by the second single "Without You" on June 19. They were both officially released on July 22, 2015. The band's guitarist, founder and main songwriter, Michael Romeo, said he was against releasing separated tracks of the album, since it was written to be "a whole".

== Composition and lyrical themes ==
Commenting on whether the album would revisit elements from previous records while also exploring new sounds, guitarist and main songwriter Michael Romeo said:

There was definitely an effort to do some of the things we've always done. [...] We're definitely conscious of the fans. There's fans of the band that like an album like [2011's] Iconoclast that's very heavy, and there's some that like the more progressive and very melodic kind of thing. [...] And the other big thing, too, was just trying to really make it, listening-wise, cohesive, as a whole record; you know, the dips and the gaps and then the peaks, and really trying to think of the record as a whole too.

On another opportunity, he also commented:

This new one is about the song, really crafting each one on its own, to be as strong as it could be. Musically, Underworld has things reminiscent of the bands previous albums but this one definitely has its own individuality. Every element added was in service of the song, so the album flows and becomes a total listening experience from start to finish. Every song is to the point and fine-tuned, with us paying a lot of attention to the hooks, voices, riffs, and keeping the interest and the energy high for the entire record. It is heavy and aggressive as fuck when it needs to be, yet soaring and emotional at other times. I think the balance is just right. It had to have all the elements of what we normally would do, just tweaked up a notch and really fine-tuned.

According to Romeo, not as many people enjoy concept records as they used to, but he expects to make an album "worth listening to as a whole record. It's what I love about great individual songs, but still an album experience."

The album is inspired by Dante's Inferno and Orpheus in the Underworld. While Romeo does not consider Underworld to be a concept album, he admits that there is a common theme:

We try to find something to key in on and get the juices flowing, and here the goal was to find something a little dark but with emotional content. I started looking at Dante, and Orpheus in the underworld, where he's going to go to Hades or hell to save this girl. So there's the theme of going to hell and back for something or someone you care about.

The usage of the number three by Dante is also referenced in the album. The opening track, "Nevermore", has three syllables, a three-note melodic phrase, and its verses contain three references to three songs from the band's third album, The Divine Wings of Tragedy.

The album cover was created by Warren Flanagan. The art includes different symbols for each of the nine circles of hell mentioned in Dante's work.

== Track listing ==
All music is composed by Michael Romeo, except where noted

No.	Title	Lyrics	Length
1.	"Overture"	Instrumental	2:13
2.	"Nevermore"	Romeo, Michael LePond	5:29
3.	"Underworld" (Romeo, Michael Pinnella)	Romeo, LePond	5:48
4.	"Without You"	Romeo	5:51
5.	"Kiss of Fire"	Romeo, LePond	5:09
6.	"Charon" (Romeo, Pinnella, LePond)	Romeo, LePond	6:06
7.	"To Hell and Back"	Romeo	9:23
8.	"In My Darkest Hour"	Romeo	4:22
9.	"Run with the Devil"	Russell Allen, Romeo	5:38
10.	"Swan Song" (Pinnella, Romeo)	Romeo, LePond	7:29
11.	"Legend" (Romeo, Pinnella)	Romeo	6:29
Total length:			63:57

== Personnel ==
Credits per album booklet:

- Russell Allen − vocals
- Michael Romeo − guitars
- Michael Pinnella − keyboards
- Michael LePond − bass
- Jason Rullo – drums

Technical personnel

- Michael Romeo – production, recording and engineering
- Jens Bogren – mixing and mastering at Fascination Street
- Warren Flanagan and Milena Zdravkovic – artwork
- Patrick Zahorodniuk – graphic design
- Danny Sanchez – band photography
- Eric Rachel – guitar reamping at Trax East

== Charts ==
Chart (2015)	Peak position
Austrian Albums (Ö3 Austria)	59
Belgian Albums (Ultratop Flanders)	101
Belgian Albums (Ultratop Wallonia)	42
Dutch Albums (Album Top 100)	20
Finnish Albums (Suomen virallinen lista)	12
French Albums (SNEP)	54
German Albums (Offizielle Top 100)	23
Hungarian Albums (MAHASZ)	17
Italian Albums (FIMI)	65
Japanese Albums (Oricon)	46
Swedish Albums (Sverigetopplistan)	31
Swiss Albums (Schweizer Hitparade)	10
UK Albums (OCC)	80
US Billboard 200	89
US Top Hard Rock Albums (Billboard)	6
US Independent Albums (Billboard)	8
US Indie Store Album Sales (Billboard)	8
US Top Rock Albums (Billboard)	12
