= Symphony X =

American metal band

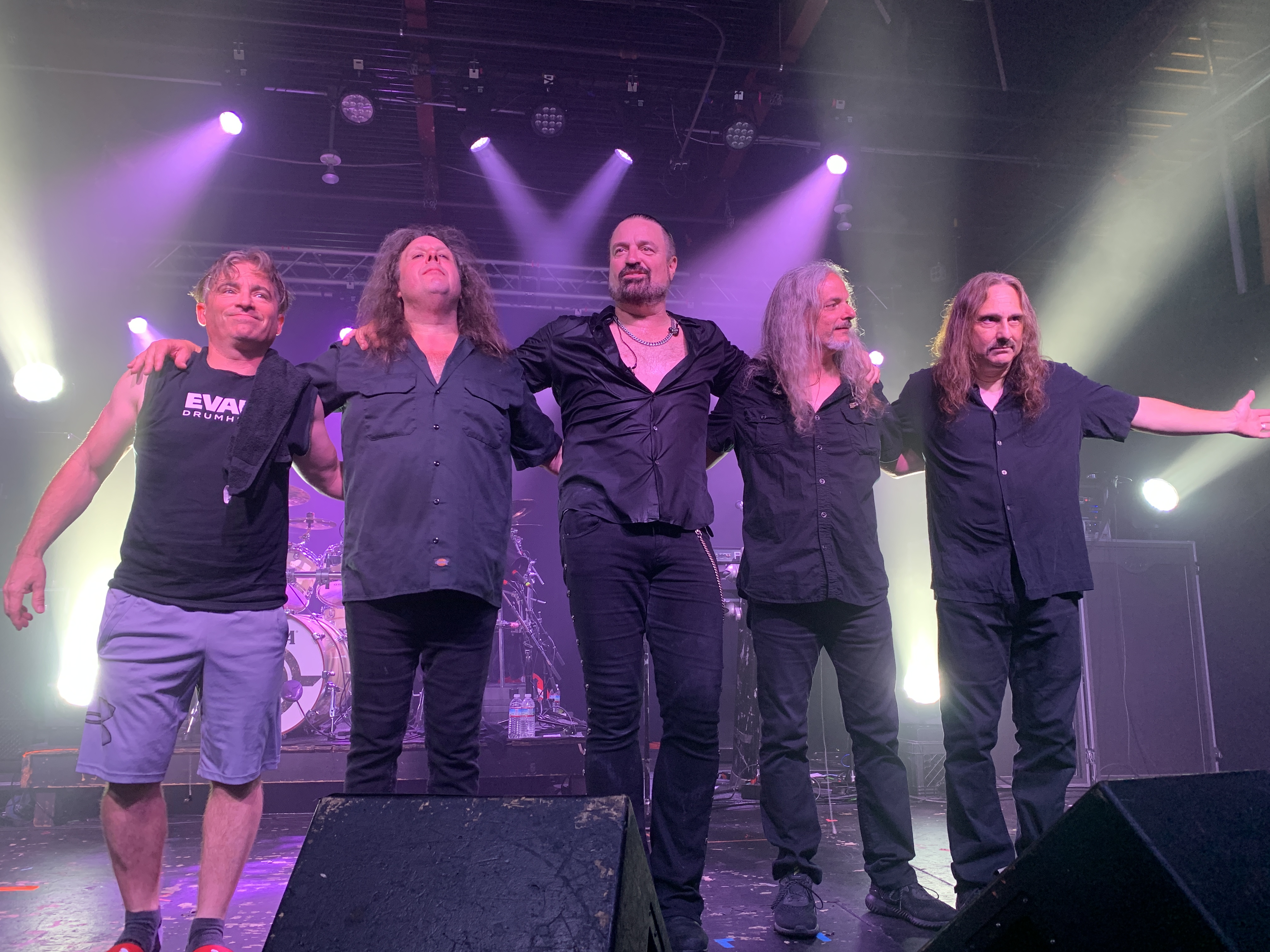
- Symphony X performing in Carrboro, North Carolina, 2022

Background information
- Origin: Middletown, New Jersey, U.S.
- Genres: Progressive metal; power metal; neoclassical metal; symphonic metal
- Years active: 1994–present
- Labels: Nuclear Blast; Inside Out; Zero Corporation
- Members: Michael Romeo; Michael Pinnella; Russell Allen; Jason Rullo; Michael LePond
- Past members: Thomas Miller; Rod Tyler; Thomas Walling
- Website: symphonyx.com

Symphony X is an American progressive metal band from Middletown, New Jersey. Founded in 1994, the band consists of guitarist Michael Romeo, keyboardist Michael Pinnella, drummer Jason Rullo, lead vocalist Russell Allen and bassist Michael LePond.

They achieved some commercial success with the 2007 album Paradise Lost and the 2011 album Iconoclast, which reached number 76 on the Billboard 200.

The albums The Divine Wings of Tragedy and V: The New Mythology Suite were partially recorded in The Dungeon, Romeo's home studio. The Odyssey, Paradise Lost, Iconoclast and Underworld were fully recorded there and produced by Romeo himself.

== History ==
=== Symphony X and The Damnation Game (1994−1995) ===
In 1992, Michael Romeo (formerly of the bands Phantom's Opera and Gemini) recorded a demo album in his apartment which was sent to various record labels. The tape attracted attention in Japan with the now-defunct record company Zero Corporation. In April 1994, a new version of The Dark Chapter, which featured Romeo and keyboard player Michael Pinnella, was released by Zero Corporation.

When asked by Zero Corporation if he had a band in the same genre, Romeo recruited bassist Thomas Miller, drummer Jason Rullo, and vocalist Rod Tyler, with Pinnella remaining on keys. Together, the band recorded a demo tape entitled Danse Macabre some time in 1994. It is unclear if the tape was intended for Zero Corporation alone, or if it was sent to other record labels for consideration. Two songs from the demo would be recorded for the band's self-titled debut album, which was released by Zero Corporation in December 1994.

Romeo explained the band's name in a 2008 interview; "the music we were coming up with had the keyboard thing and the guitar, and some classical elements, so the word 'Symphony' came up and ... then, somebody said 'Symphony X' and we were like, 'yeah, that's cool' it is that kinda thing, and the 'X' is the unknown and all the other stuff we do."

After the release of Symphony X in 1994, Rod Tyler left the band due to creative differences and was replaced by current singer Russell Allen, who Tyler had previously introduced to the band. The band's second album, The Damnation Game, released in August 1995. Both albums were released in Asia through Japanese company Zero Corporation, and were later released in Europe under license to German company Inside Out.

=== The Divine Wings of Tragedy and Twilight in Olympus (1996−1998) ===
The Divine Wings of Tragedy, recorded in 1996 and released in November of the same year by Zero Corporation in Japan, proved to be successful for the band, generating interest outside of Japan and within wider circles in the metal community. The album would have a European release in March 1997, again through German label Inside Out. In a 2008 interview, Romeo recalled "it felt like we were a ‘real band’ now, we really had our thing going and more and more people were getting exposed to it." The album was positively received, with AllMusic praising Romeo's "pyrotechnic displays" and describing Pinnella and Miller as "equally competent on their respective instruments".

Following the release of The Divine Wings of Tragedy, drummer Rullo left the band for personal reasons. Romeo would later recall there was some tension in the band at the time between drummer Rullo and bassist Miller. The band recruited a new drummer, Thomas Walling, to replace Rullo and recorded Twilight in Olympus in 1998. The album was released in February 1998 via Zero Corporation in Japan and simultaneously via Inside Out in Europe. The album released to favourable reviews, though Romeo has since voiced his concerns that the album was "rushed" due to pressure from Zero Corporation as well as "rushing back into the studio to get stuff done with [Walling]," continuing "I think of all our albums, that's not one of my favourites mainly because of that reason - it's kinda rushed. Some of the stuff on there is not what it could and should have been."

1998 saw the first live performances for the band, which had been organised prior to the release of Twilight in Olympus. Their first official show was in Osaka, Japan on June 23, 1998, which was soon followed by a world tour. Following the initial run of Japanese shows, bassist Miller and drummer Walling both left the band due to their unwillingness to tour. Original drummer Rullo rejoined the band, and the band recruited touring bassist Andy DeLuca before finding a permanent replacement in Michael LePond.

A compilation album, Prelude to the Millennium, was released by the end of 1998. It featured a re-recording of "Masquerade" from the first album Symphony X, featuring Russell Allen on vocals.

=== V: The New Mythology Suite and The Odyssey (1999−2005) ===
The band's fifth album, V: The New Mythology Suite, released in October 2000. The album would mark the band's first worldwide release on a major record label, Inside Out, who had licensed Symphony X's previous albums for European releases. The album was their first concept album, dealing with the myth of Atlantis. Romeo stated the band wanted to focus on the record as a whole rather than any one particular song. The album features touring staples such as "Evolution (The Grand Design)", "Communion and the Oracle" and "Egypt", and prominently features a number of classical music pieces.

The band supported the album with a European and South American tour shortly after its release. The band's first live album, Live on the Edge of Forever, was recorded on the European leg of the tour in Élysée Montmartre, Paris and was released in November 2001.

In 2002, the band released The Odyssey, an album prominently featuring a 24-minute-long musical interpretation of the Homeric epic, the Odyssey. The album was again released worldwide by Inside Out, and was the first album to be recorded entirely in Romeo's home studio The Dungeon. The album was particularly successful for the band, again expanding their audience on an international scale. The band supported the album by touring North America with Blind Guardian, which marked some of the first North American shows for both bands.

In 2005 Symphony X was featured on Gigantour, a summer festival headlined by Megadeth with Dream Theater, Nevermore and Anthrax. Two Symphony X songs from the tour, "Inferno" and "Of Sins and Shadows", are featured on the Gigantour DVD and CD-set, released in September 2006.

=== Paradise Lost (2006–2010) ===
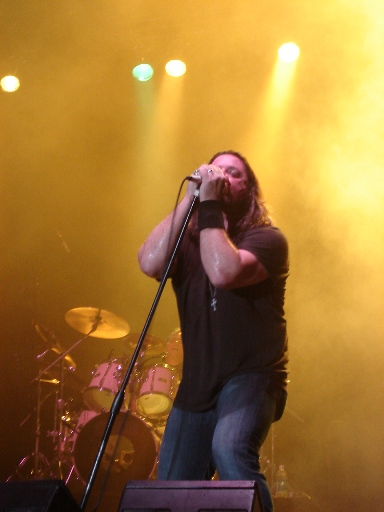
Vocalist Russell Allen performing in San Juan, Puerto Rico on May 27, 2007.

The band's album Paradise Lost, an album thematically inspired by John Milton's epic poem of the same name, was recorded in Romeo's studio throughout 2006. The recording process was delayed numerous times due to water damage in The Dungeon, as well as an extended touring cycle. The album finally released worldwide on June 26, 2007 through Inside Out. The album has darker musical themes, with use of heavy riffs and classical motifs. A limited number of albums from certain vendors contained a special DVD, which consists of footage of the band's live performances.

Paradise Lost debuted at number 123 on the Billboard 200 album chart in the United States, selling 6,300 copies in its first week. The record also debuted at number 1 on the Top Heatseekers Chart.

Following the release, the band embarked on a 14-month world tour, including a tour through all of Europe with Dream Theater in the fall of 2007. The band also revealed plans to perform in Japan and other Asian countries, as well as appear for the first time ever in Russia, India, and the Middle East.

Symphony X released their first music video for the song "Serpent's Kiss" on July 28, 2007. It was followed by a video for "Set the World on Fire", released on January 11, 2008. The band toured North and South America from October to November 2008, and toured Asia in February 2009.

=== Iconoclast (2011–2013) ===
On March 1, 2010, an update on the Symphony X official website announced that the band had recorded most of their next album, and that Romeo and Allen were working on lyrics; Romeo was getting ready to start tracking the album. The album's name and lyrical concept were revealed on January 29, 2011 in an interview with Allen on Metal Messiah Radio: the follow-up to Paradise Lost will be titled Iconoclast and will have its lyrics centered around "machines taking over everything and all this technology we put our society into pretty much being our demise." On February 25, 2011, Symphony X played the first show of their 2011 tour in Stuttgart, Germany, where they performed two songs from the upcoming Iconoclast: "End of Innocence" and "Dehumanized". Some days later in Antwerp, Belgium, they debuted "Heretic". During their show in London, England, the band played yet another new song titled "Prometheus".

Iconoclast released in Europe on June 17 and in North America on June 21, 2011, the band's first release through German label Nuclear Blast. The album was available as a Standard Edition as well as a 2-CD Digipack. Iconoclast debuted at number 76 on the Billboard 200 album chart in the United States, selling more than 7,300 copies in its first week. The record also debuted at number 7 on the Top Hard Rock Chart, number 19 on the Top Rock Chart and number 13 on the Top Independent Chart. The album showcases the highest chart position and the most first-week sales in the band's history up to that point.

On February 27, 2013, it was announced that drummer Jason Rullo had been admitted to hospital due to heart failure. Rullo spent a week in hospital before being released home to undergo a rehabilitation program that would take 3–6 months under doctors' care. John Macaluso joined the band on tour for their South American and European dates, giving Rullo time to recover.

=== Underworld and band hiatus (2015–2018) ===
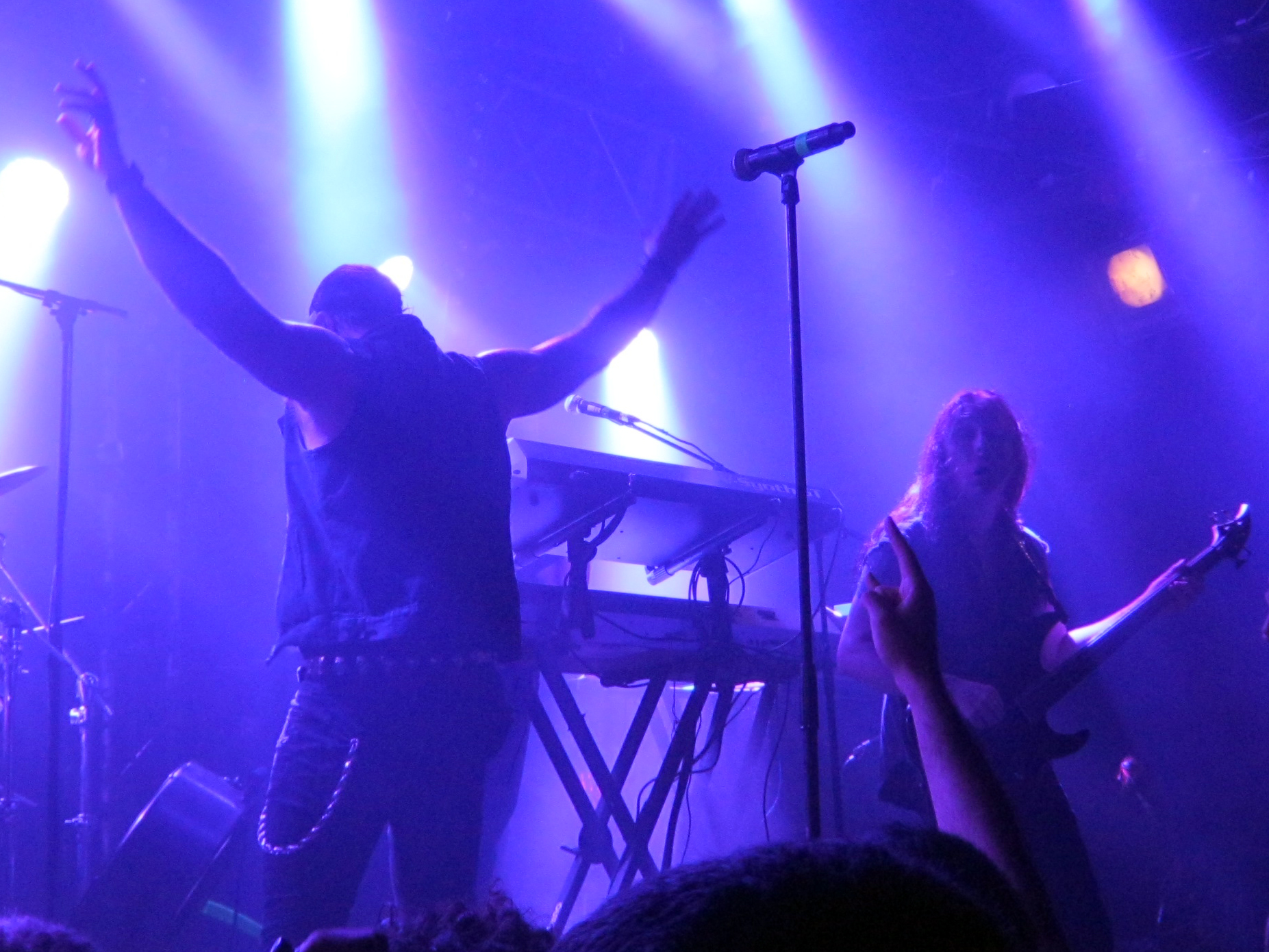
Vocalist Russell Allen and bassist Mike LePond of Symphony X performing in Israel, 2016

The band began recording the drum tracks for their ninth studio album on September 9, 2014, and planned to release the complete recording by the spring of 2015. LePond stated they had ten songs written and that the album would contain either nine or all ten of them. He also stated all lyrics and instrumental tracks were composed and ready to be brought together, and that the album would be less heavy than Iconoclast: "If I had to compare, I would say that it's a combination of The Odyssey and Paradise Lost — something in there. It has a lot of classic Symphony X elements in it, which I think a lot of our fans were missing for a few years. So I think our fans will really like this one. It really just focuses on solid songwriting." As of December 11, 2014, recording of the drums, lead vocals, rhythm guitar, and bass were complete. With the keyboards, guitar solos, background vocals, and some miscellaneous odds and ends being done in the coming weeks. On April 10, 2015 the band announced the mixing and mastering of the new album was complete.

On May 18, 2015, the band announced the title of the album would be titled Underworld, and a release date of July 24 through Nuclear Blast. The first single from the album, "Nevermore", premiered on May 22. The band released the second single, "Without You", on June 19, which was made available for digital download. The band embarked on a world tour following the release of the album.

According to singer Russell Allen, the band entered a short hiatus during 2017 in which they did not perform, due in part to his commitment to Adrenaline Mob, although it was announced during a January 2018 interview with Metal Nation that the band had plans to get together in the following months and begin writing a follow-up to Underworld. On July 14, 2017, Adrenaline Mob was involved in a serious vehicular accident, which resulted in severe injuries for Allen and the death of the band's bassist and their tour manager. In July 2018, according to Romeo, the band hoped to re-group and make another album, but also said that he was giving Allen some time and space after dealing with the aftermath of the accident, and also Allen's touring commitments with Trans-Siberian Orchestra.

=== Touring and upcoming tenth studio album (2019–present) ===
The band returned to the stage in May 2019 with a European tour. In June 2019, Romeo said the band were considering making their tenth album following the conclusion of their tour in August. In December 2019, the band announced a 25th Anniversary North American tour would take place in May and June 2020. However, the shows would later be postponed due to the COVID-19 pandemic.

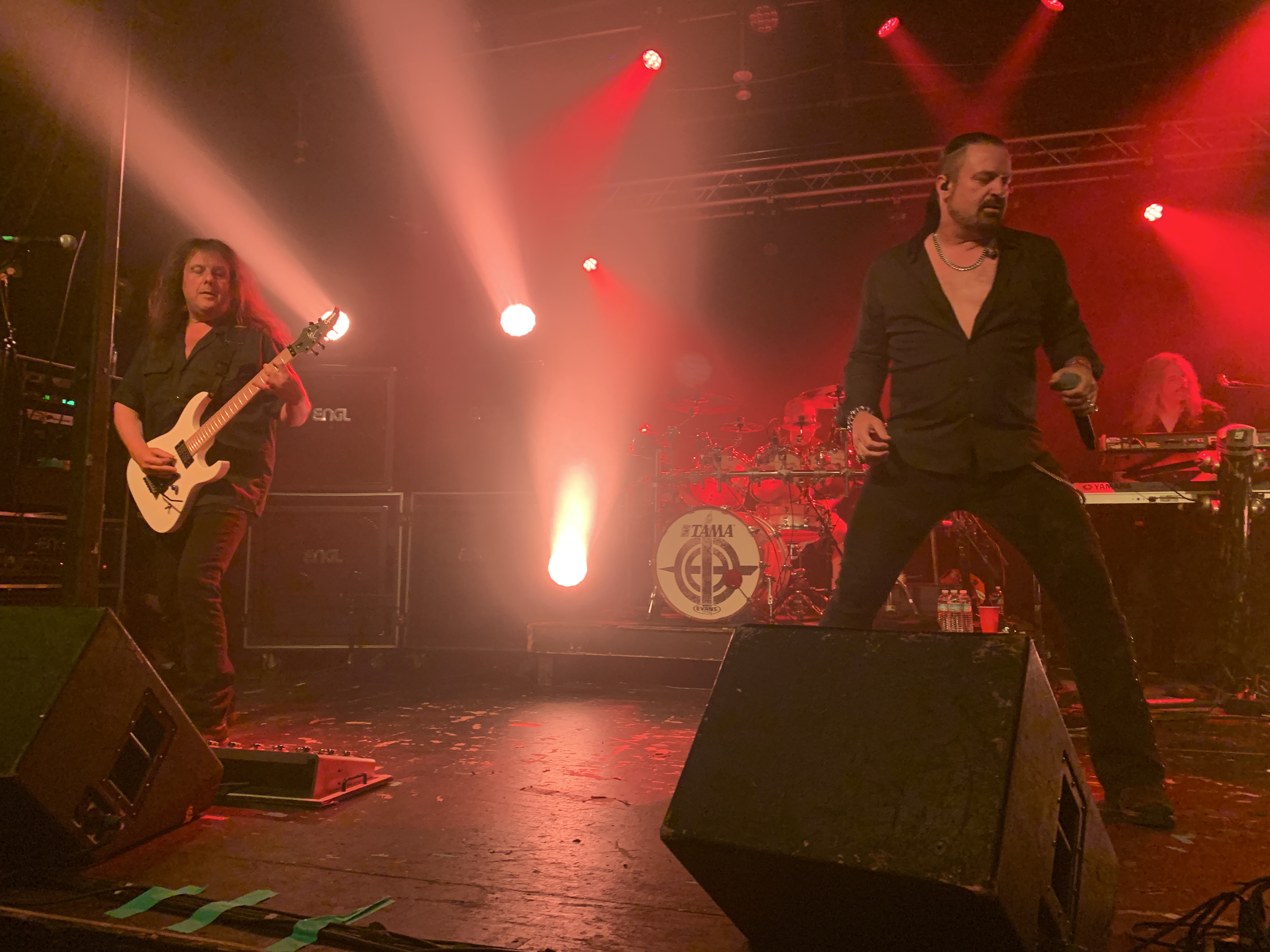
Romeo and Allen performing the 25th Anniversary tour in Carrboro, NC in 2022

During bassist LePond's May 2020 interview with Metal Nation when asked about plans for him and the band, he had confirmed that the band was ready to start writing the tenth studio album, a follow-up to their 2015 album Underworld, as soon as the virus slowed down, and that writing would begin in about "a month or so".

Symphony X performed their 25th Anniversary shows in South America and North America, in August 2021 and May 2022 respectively. While promoting War of the Worlds, Pt. 2 in early 2022, Romeo confirmed that writing for the next album had begun. Romeo stated "we are working on it", noting the process "feels a little slower than normal" due to the band's extended hiatus and inability to tour due to the COVID-19 pandemic. In a November 2022 interview, Romeo reiterated that work was continuing but that the band had not yet settled on a theme or vision for the record.

In a 2024 interview with Ola Englund, Romeo again confirmed that the band had been working on new material between legs of their American and European tours. Romeo stated the band have finished writing and have moved on to song arrangement.

In April 2025, the band announced a final tour of North America in support of Underworld. In August 2025, during an interview promoting the band's final tour for Underworld, LePond confirmed the new album is progressing and hoped it would be released "next year".

In August 2026, the members of Symphony X confirmed that their new album will be recorded in September and is set for release in 2027.

== Musical style ==
Symphony X's music includes complex timings and odd meters while incorporating elements of heavy metal and progressive rock. Their early albums in particular contain strong neo-classical elements reminiscent of Yngwie Malmsteen, Randy Rhoads, and others. The band have been categorized as progressive metal, power metal, and neoclassical metal, though the band themselves dislike genre labels with Romeo stating they can be "misleading sometimes ... at the core of it all we're a metal band".

Symphony X's music is often driven by a particular theme or concept. Romeo has stated that creating an album with a consistent theme helps the writing process, as the theme will drive the direction of the music. To date, V: The New Mythology Suite is the only concept album released by the band.

Symphony X is often compared to other progressive metal bands such as Dream Theater, Fates Warning, and Shadow Gallery.

== Solo projects ==
Keyboardist Michael Pinnella released a solo album, entitled Enter by the Twelfth Gate, on October 12, 2004. Another solo album, Ascension, was released in 2014.

Vocalist Russell Allen's solo debut, entitled Atomic Soul, was released in the summer of 2005. With this album, Allen took a different musical direction from that seen in his work with Symphony X. It was considered by many—including Allen himself—to be a hard rock album. Also in 2005, he recorded an album called The Battle with former Masterplan vocalist Jørn Lande under the moniker "Allen/Lande". The two would later record follow-up albums entitled The Revenge, released May 11, 2007; The Showdown, released November 5, 2010; and The Great Divide, released October 21, 2014.

In early 2011, Russell Allen co-founded heavy metal supergroup Adrenaline Mob with guitarist Mike Orlando and drummer Mike Portnoy (Dream Theater), who has since left the group. They have released three studio albums, Omertá (2012), Men of Honor (2014) and We the People (2017).

Bassist Michael LePond released his first solo album, Mike LePond's Silent Assassins on September 26, 2014. It features guest performances from guitarist Mike Chlasciak (Halford, Testament), lead guitarist, drum producer and Symphony X bandmate Michael Romeo, and vocalist Alan Tecchio (Hades, Watchtower). LePond himself played bass and rhythm guitar.

Michael Romeo's second solo album, War of the Worlds, Pt. 1, was released on July 27, 2018. The album features Rick Castellano on vocals, John DeServio on bass, and John Macaluso on drums. It was Romeo's first solo album since The Dark Chapter, which was released in 1994. War of the Worlds, Pt. 2 was released on March 25, 2022 with Dino Jelusick replacing Castellano on vocals.

Jason Rullo's first album with new band 3 Rules, Rule of 3, was released in 2020. The band is composed of guitar player Ron Sanborn and bassist Artha Meadors.

== Band members ==
Current

- Michael Romeo − guitars, backing vocals (1994–present)
- Michael Pinnella − keyboards, backing vocals (1994–present)
- Jason Rullo – drums (1994–1997, 1999–present)
- Russell Allen − lead vocals (1995–present)
- Michael LePond − bass, backing vocals (1999–present)

Former

- Rod Tyler − lead vocals (1994−1995)
- Thomas Miller − bass, backing vocals (1994−1999)
- Thomas Walling − drums (1997−1999; died 2022)

Touring

- Andy DeLuca - bass (1998)
- John Macaluso - drums (2013)

== Discography ==
Studio albums

- Symphony X (1994)
- The Damnation Game (1995)
- The Divine Wings of Tragedy (1996)
- Twilight in Olympus (1998)
- V: The New Mythology Suite (2000)
- The Odyssey (2002)
- Paradise Lost (2007)
- Iconoclast (2011)
- Underworld (2015)

Singles

- "The End of Innocence" (2011)
- "Nevermore" (2015)
- "Without You" (2015)

Other albums

- Prelude to the Millennium (1999, compilation)
- Live on the Edge of Forever (2001, live)
