= Symphony X (album) =

Studio album by Symphony X
- Released: December 6, 1994
- Recorded: August–September 1994
- Studio: The Hit Factory in New York City; The Castle Studios
- Genre: Progressive metal; neoclassical metal
- Length: 53:30
- Label: Zero Corporation
- Producer: Symphony X

Symphony X chronology
Symphony X (1994)	The Damnation Game (1995)

Symphony X is the first studio album by American progressive metal band Symphony X, originally released in 1994 through Zero Corporation in Japan, and reissued in 1996 through Inside Out Music in Europe; a remastered edition was reissued on January 13, 2004 through Inside Out Music. The album's release came about as a result of band guitarist Michael Romeo's 1994 solo album, The Dark Chapter, achieving success in Japan. It is the only Symphony X album to feature singer Rod Tyler, who would be replaced by Russell Allen on all subsequent works.

== Critical reception ==
Professional ratings
Review scores
Source	Rating
AllMusic	1.5/5 stars

Robert Taylor at AllMusic gave Symphony X 1.5 stars out of 5, noting the predominant Yngwie Malmsteen influences throughout the music, and calling the album "Humble beginnings for what was to become a very original and influential band."

== Track listing ==
All tracks are written by Symphony X.

No.	Title	Length
1.	"Into the Dementia"	1:01
2.	"The Raging Season"	5:01
3.	"Premonition"	5:37
4.	"Masquerade"	4:28
5.	"Absinthe and Rue"	7:16
6.	"Shades of Grey"	5:41
7.	"Taunting the Notorious"	3:20
8.	"Rapture or Pain"	5:05
9.	"Thorns of Sorrow"	3:54
10.	"A Lesson Before Dying"	12:07
Total length:		53:30

== Personnel ==
- Rod Tyler – vocals
- Michael Romeo – guitar
- Michael Pinnella – keyboard
- Jason Rullo – drums
- Thomas Miller – bass

Technical personnel

- Mike Thompson – engineering, mixing
- Joseph M. Palmaccio – mastering
