= The Edge of Forever =

The Edge of Forever may refer to:

- "The Edge of Forever" (The Dream Academy song), a song by The Dream Academy
- "The Edge of Forever", a song by the band Symphony X from their album The Damnation Game
- "The Edge of Forever", a song by Richard Marx in the album Days in Avalon
- Live on the Edge of Forever, the first live album by the band Symphony X
- "The City on the Edge of Forever", a Star Trek episode written by Harlan Ellison
- "The Edge of Forever", an episode of Cosmos: A Personal Voyage
