= War of the Worlds, Pt. 2 =

Studio album by Michael Romeo
- Released: March 25, 2022
- Genre: Progressive metal; neoclassical metal; symphonic metal; power metal
- Length: 66:24
- Label: Inside Out Music

Michael Romeo chronology
War of the Worlds, Pt. 1 (2018)	War of the Worlds, Pt. 2 (2022)

Singles from War of the Worlds, Pt. 2
- 1. "Divide & Conquer" Released: January 7, 2022; 2. "Metamorphosis" Released: February 16, 2022

War of the Worlds, Pt. 2 is the third solo album by Symphony X guitarist Michael Romeo, released on 25 March 2022 via Inside Out Music. It is a sequel to his previous album released in 2018, War of the Worlds, Pt. 1. It was originally scheduled for a February 4, 2022 release.

Romeo retained the same line-up of the previous release except for the vocals, which are now handled by Dino Jelusick. Like its predecessor, the album is inspired by the homonymous novel by H. G. Wells and, according to Romeo, "it takes the first record deeper into the journey. It's H.G. Wells with modern-day sci-fi, and there's a lot of super-heavy cinematic music and, obviously, lots of guitars". By the time Romeo released the first part, he already announced that a sequel was at the final stages of recording, but would take a while to be released because he wanted people "to absorb the first one for a while, and then we'll put out the second record. They'll complement each other, but they'll also be a bit different".

The first single and video, "Divide & Conquer", was released on January 7, 2022, with the video directed by Wayne Joyner. The second ones, "Metamorphosis", came on February 16, with the video also directed by Joyner.

The album was released as 180g black double LP gatefold, a limited double CD PocketPak with the instrumental version of the album and as a digital release.

== Track listing ==
War of the Worlds, Pt. 2 track listing
No.	Title	Length
1.	"Introduction - Part II" (instrumental)	2:37
2.	"Divide & Conquer"	4:46
3.	"Destroyer"	5:34
4.	"Metamorphosis"	5:53
5.	"Mothership" (instrumental)	2:23
6.	"Just Before the Dawn"	5:01
7.	"Hybrids"	6:14
8.	"Hunted" (instrumental)	4:32
9.	"Maschinenmensch"	9:03
10.	"Parasite"	4:33
11.	"Brave New World (Outro)" (instrumental)	3:36
12.	"The Perfect Weapon" (bonus track)	7:41
13.	"Alien DeathRay" (bonus track, instrumental)	4:31
Total length:		66:24

Japanese edition bonus track
No.	Title	Length
14.	"Godzilla"	3:59
Total length:		70:28

Japanese limited edition bonus CD (Disc 2)
No.	Title	Length
1.	"Introduction - Part II"	2:37
2.	"Divide & Conquer" (instrumental)	4:46
3.	"Destroyer" (instrumental)	5:34
4.	"Metamorphosis" (instrumental)	5:53
5.	"Mothership"	2:23
6.	"Just Before the Dawn" (instrumental)	5:01
7.	"Hybrids" (instrumental)	6:14
8.	"Hunted"	4:32
9.	"Maschinenmensch" (instrumental)	9:03
10.	"Parasite" (instrumental)	4:33
11.	"Brave New World (Outro)"	3:36
12.	"The Perfect Weapon" (instrumental)	7:41
13.	"Alien DeathRay"	4:31
14.	"Godzilla"	3:59
Total length:		70:28

== Personnel ==
- Dino Jelusick – vocals
- Michael Romeo – guitars, keyboards, orchestrations, cello, saz, oud
- John DeServio – bass guitar
- John Macaluso – drums

== Reception ==
Professional ratings
Review scores
Source	Rating
Sonic Perspectives	9.3
Metal Hammer (Germany)	6/7

On the German edition of Metal Hammer, Matthias Mineur described Romeo as "a master of a style hybrid of power, neo-classical and prog metal and [...] compositionally savvy". He said Jelusick "lifts" the album "to an even higher level" than that of its predecessor and finished his review saying that the release "inspires on two levels, so that the listener can hardly decide which of them is the more important."

On Sonic Perspectives, John Kokel also thought this album was better than the previous one. He praised Romeo for remaining "an Olympic gold medalist in lead guitar, but more importantly, he continues to fine-tune and push his skills as a composer." He conceded that the album bears some similarities with Romeo's main band Symphony X, but compared it favorably to other contemporary symphonic metal efforts. He summarized his review calling the album "a world-shaking fusion of cinematic symphony with the very best of modern progressive metal".

== Charts ==
Chart performance for War of the Worlds, Pt. 2
Chart (2022)	Peak position
Belgian Albums (Ultratop Wallonia)	129
German Albums (Offizielle Top 100)	62
Swiss Albums (Schweizer Hitparade)	22
