= Michael LePond =

American musician

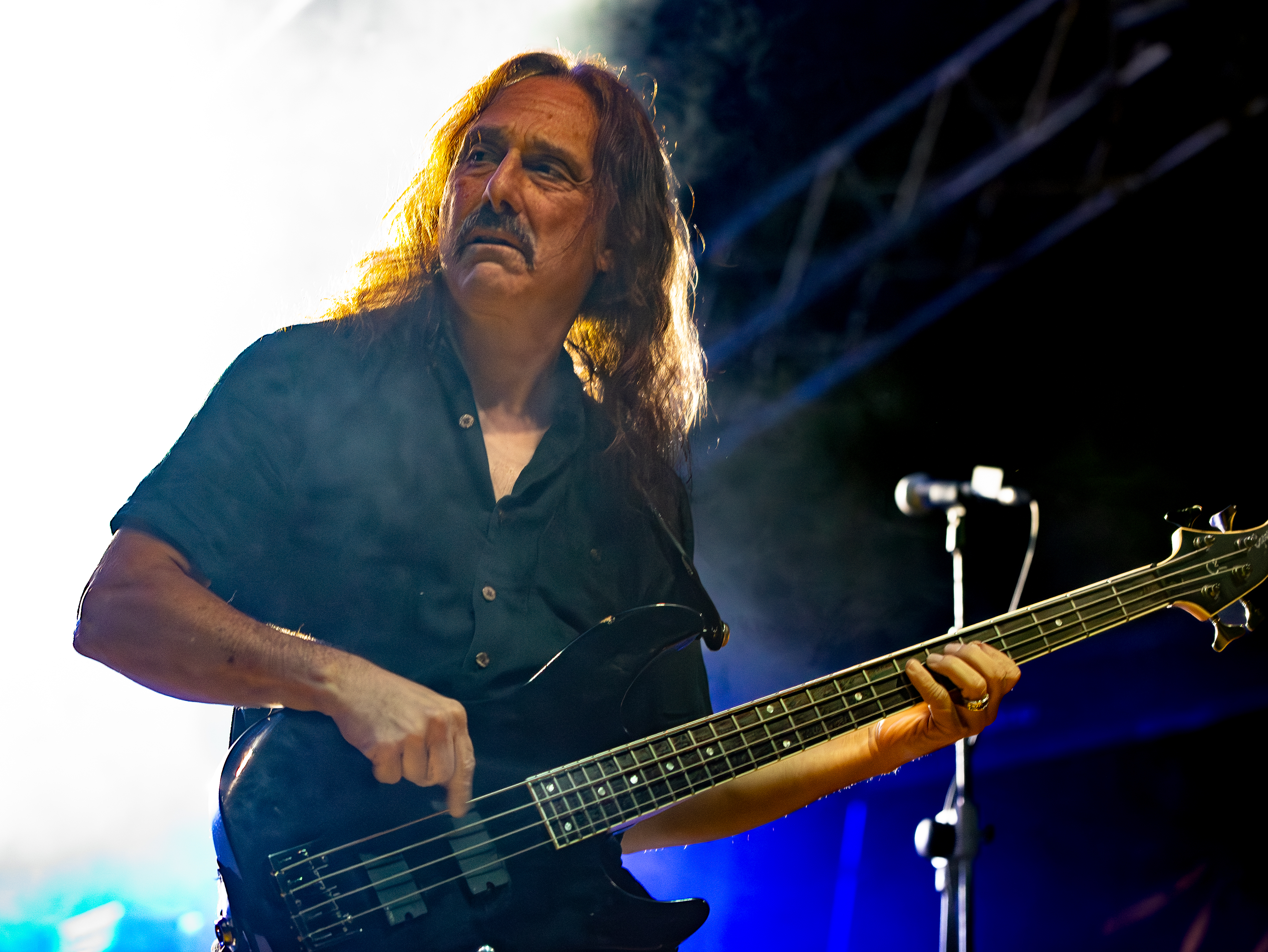
- LePond performing with Symphony X in 2024

Background information
- Born: Michael Anthony LePond III; 1966 (age 59–60)
- Genres: Progressive metal
- Occupations: Musician, songwriter
- Instruments: Bass, backing vocals
- Years active: 1995–present

Michael Anthony LePond III (born 1966), is an American musician from Newark, New Jersey. LePond has recorded over 40 albums with various bands and has appeared on over 20 other albums in a guest capacity.

Best known as the current bassist of the progressive metal band Symphony X, LePond joined the band in 1999 and can be heard on all albums since the release of V: The New Mythology Suite in 2000. He has also worked with a number of bands within the European metal scene, and has released 4 solo albums with Mike LePond's Silent Assassins.

== Biography ==
In 1979, at the age of 13, LePond attended a Kiss concert in Madison Square Garden, New York. Upon seeing the performances of Gene Simmons, LePond decided "that's what I wanna do!" LePond's father soon bought him a Univox bass guitar and a 150 watt amplifier. LePond took lessons from a jazz musician for approximately one year, learning music theory and sight reading, but did not feel strongly for the genre and instead oped to self-teach. LePond was introduced to Rush, Black Sabbath and Iron Maiden through friends, and has since cited bassists Geddy Lee, Geezer Butler and Steve Harris as influences to his style of playing.

In 1999, LePond was introduced to Symphony X guitarist Michael Romeo through a mutual friend. Romeo invited LePond to audition for Symphony X, as the band were in need of a bassist following the departures of Thomas Miller and touring musician Andy DeLuca. LePond was sent a copy of The Divine Wings of Tragedy, and was required to learn 3 songs for the audition, later recalling how challenging the material was to learn. A second audition was arranged, this time with 2 songs from Twilight in Olympus. He has gone on to record 5 albums with the band.

In May 2006, LePond was diagnosed with Crohn's disease following hospitalisation for abdominal pain. LePond required surgery, causing Symphony X to cancel festival appearances in Spain and Sweden. On May 31, LePond announced his recovery on Symphony X's website.

In 2012, LePond formed progressive metal supergroup Affector with drummer Collin Leijenaar, vocalist Ted Leonard and guitarist Daniel Fries. The band's first album, Harmagedon, was released on May 21. The album includes guest keyboard players Jordan Rudess, Derek Sherinian, Neal Morse and Alex Argento.

On August 21, 2014, it was announced that LePond would be releasing his first solo album, Mike LePond's Silent Assassins. The album was released on September 26, featuring LePond on bass and rhythm guitar. Symphony X bandmate Michael Romeo provided drum programming and some guitar work on the album, with vocals provided by Alan Tecchio (Hades, Watchtower) and additional guitar work from Mike Chlasciak (Halford, Testament).

== Equipment ==
Upon joining Symphony X, LePond was playing a red 1987 Hamer Scarab 4-string bass guitar, which was featured on the releases V: The New Mythology Suite and Live on the Edge of Forever. The instrument was used on tour with Symphony X up to 2002 and was later auctioned off by the band. Since 2007, LePond's primary bass has been a Caparison Dellinger 4-string. He also plays Fender Jazz Bass and an 8-string John Galagher Oktober bass.

== Discography ==
=== With Symphony X ===
- V: The New Mythology Suite (2000)
- The Odyssey (2002)
- Paradise Lost (2007)
- Iconoclast (2011)
- Underworld (2015)

=== With Mike LePond's Silent Assassins ===
- Mike LePond's Silent Assassins (2014)
- Pawn And Prophecy (2018)
- Whore of Babylon (2020)
