= The Dark Chapter =

Studio album by Michael Romeo
- Released: April 1994
- Recorded: 1992–1994
- Genre: Instrumental rock; progressive metal; neoclassical metal
- Length: 42:49
- Label: Zero Corporation
- Producer: Michael Romeo

Michael Romeo chronology
The Dark Chapter (1994)	War of the Worlds, Pt. 1 (2018)

The Dark Chapter is the first studio album by Symphony X guitarist Michael Romeo, released in April 1994 through Zero Corporation (Japan) and reissued in 2000 through InsideOut Music (Europe).

== Overview ==
Originally recorded in 1992 as a demo tape which Romeo had sent out to various guitar publications, the album that would eventually become The Dark Chapter garnered the attention of a Japanese record label named Zero Corporation, who expressed an interest in further material. Romeo then joined up with keyboardist Michael Pinnella to re-record the album for a CD release through Zero in 1994, after which both musicians went on to form Symphony X. An entirely instrumental album, it bears many similarities to the progressive metal stylings of Symphony X, and could be considered a direct precursor to their self-titled debut album which was released later in 1994.

Several of the track titles are references to works by Edgar Allan Poe, such as "The Cask of Amontillado", "The Masque of the Red Death" and "The Premature Burial". The cover art portrays a raven, in reference to "The Raven", and a guitar, with its body resembling the shape of a pendulum, referencing "The Pit and the Pendulum". Most of the other track titles bear cryptic meanings: "Sevil Alucard" reads "Dracula Lives" spelled backwards (a possible reference to Dracula Lives!, a short-lived magazine by Marvel Comics); "MJR #13" is an abbreviation of the initials of Romeo's full name, Michael James Romeo; "Noit Al Ever" reads "Revelation" spelled backwards.

== Track listing ==
All music is composed by Michael Romeo, except where noted.

No.	Title	Length
1.	"Carpathia"	2:08
2.	"Cask of Amontillado"	5:07
3.	"Psychotic Episode"	4:02
4.	"Masque of the Red Death"	7:01
5.	"Sevil Alucard"	5:10
6.	"The Premature Burial"	6:20
7.	"MJR #13"	7:15
8.	"Concerto in B Minor" (Niccolò Paganini)	2:38
9.	"Noit Al Ever"	3:08
Total length:		42:49

== Personnel ==
- Michael Romeo – guitar, guitar synthesizer, keyboard (except track 8), drum programming, bass, engineering, mixing, production
- Michael Pinnella – keyboard (track 8)
- Eric Rachel – mastering
