= Mikhael Paskalev =

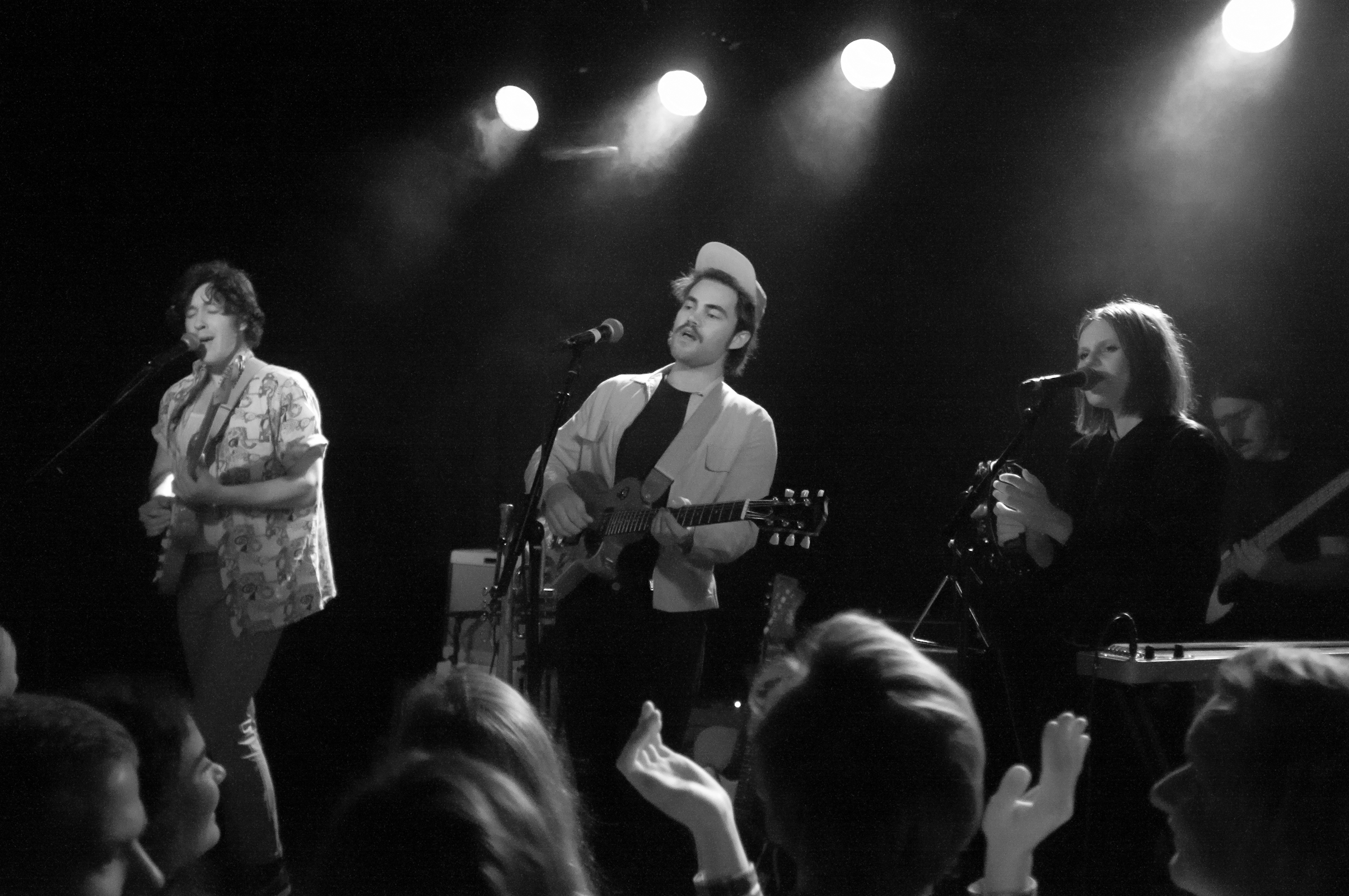
- Mikhael Paskalev performing in 2012

Background information
- Born: Jean Mikhael Paskalev Skaaden; 24 May 1987 (age 39); Ålesund, Norway
- Genres: Pop
- Occupations: Singer; songwriter; musician
- Instrument: Guitar
- Years active: 2012 – present
- Labels: Mom + Pop Music, Dew Process
- Website: mikhaelpaskalev.no

Jean Mikhael Paskalev Skaaden (born 24 May 1987), better known as Mikhael Paskalev is a Norwegian singer, songwriter and guitarist from Ålesund. He is of partial Bulgarian origin.

== Career ==
Paskalev studied at Liverpool Institute for Performing Arts, where he met with Norwegian artist Jonas Alaska. They played in each other's bands and musical projects. In February 2012, Paskalev was named Årets Urørt for 2012 as the best promising act by by:Larm. Paskalev released a self-titled EP Mikhael Paskalev in 2011 followed by a studio album What's Life Without Losers in 2012 produced by Joe Wills and recorded in Liverpool. The album entered the Top 10 of the Norwegian Albums Chart.

He remains most famous for "I Spy", an online viral music video directed by André Chocron. He has also released the single "Jive Babe" on his own independent record label Pretty Boy Floyd Records with distribution agreement with Universal Music Norway. For his European releases, he has agreements with Caramba label. He has taken part in many festivals in Norway including Øyafestivalen, Slottfjellfestivalen, By:Larm in 2011, Hove in 2012. He has also toured Europe most notably the UK, Netherlands, France, Belgium and Switzerland and has opened for Atomic Soul in Norway.

== Discography ==
=== Albums ===
Year	Album	Chart peak NOR	Certification
2013	What's Life Without Losers	5	
2017	Heavy		

=== EPs ===
- 2012: Mikhael Paskalev [Pretty Boy Floyd Records]

=== Singles ===
- 2012: "I Spy"
- 2012: "Jive Babe"
- 2013: "What's Life Without Losers"
- 2016: "Witness"
