= The Damnation Game (album) =

Studio album by Symphony X
- Released: November 6, 1995
- Studios: Trax East Recording Studio in South River, New Jersey; Studio 84 in Howell Township, New Jersey
- Genres: Progressive metal; speed metal; neoclassical metal
- Length: 46:18
- Label: Zero Corporation
- Producers: Michael Romeo, Steve Evetts, Eric Rachel

Symphony X chronology
Symphony X (1994)	The Damnation Game (1995)	The Divine Wings of Tragedy (1996)

The Damnation Game is the second studio album by American progressive metal band Symphony X, released in 1995 through Zero Corporation (Japan) and Inside Out Music (Europe); a remastered edition was reissued on September 13, 2004, through Inside Out. The album is the band's first to feature current singer Russell Allen, who replaced Rod Tyler after the release of their 1994 self-titled debut album.

== Critical reception ==
Professional ratings
Review scores
Source	Rating
AllMusic	2/5 stars
Rock Hard	9/10

Robert Taylor at AllMusic gave The Damnation Game two stars out of five, calling it an improvement over the band's debut album while criticizing the many influences taken from guitarist Yngwie Malmsteen's work: "Guitarist Michael Romeo's licks and solos are lifted right off of Malmsteen's Rising Force and Marching Out". Allen's vocals were also likened to that of Mark Boals and Jeff Scott Soto, also from Malmsteen's earlier bands.

== Track listing ==
All tracks are written by Symphony X.

No.	Title	Length
1.	"The Damnation Game"	4:32
2.	"Dressed to Kill"	4:44
3.	"The Edge of Forever"	8:58
4.	"Savage Curtain"	3:30
5.	"Whispers"	4:48
6.	"The Haunting"	5:21
7.	"Secrets"	5:42
8.	"A Winter's Dream - Prelude (Part I)"	3:03
9.	"A Winter's Dream - The Ascension (Part II)"	5:40
Total length:		46:18

== Personnel ==
- Russell Allen – lead vocals, background vocals
- Michael Romeo – guitar, background vocals
- Michael Pinnella – keyboard, background vocals
- Jason Rullo – drums, background vocals
- Thomas Miller – bass, background vocals

Technical personnel

- Michael Romeo – production
- Suha Gur – mastering
- Steve Evetts – production
- Eric Rachel – production
