= Enter by the Twelfth Gate =

Studio album by Michael Pinnella
- Released: October 12, 2004
- Genre: Progressive rock, classical
- Length: 44:24
- Label: InsideOut

Professional ratings
Review scores
Source	Rating
AllMusic	3.5/5 stars

Enter by the Twelfth Gate is the first solo album by Symphony X keyboardist, Michael Pinnella.

== Track listing ==
All tracks are written by Michael Pinnella, except for "Scriabin Etude OP. 42 No. 5," written by Alexander Scriabin

No.	Title	Length
1.	"The White Room"	5:22
2.	"Edge of Insanity"	4:26
3.	"Piano Concerto #1 Mvt. 1"	5:12
4.	"Enter by the Twelfth Gate"	4:30
5.	"Falling from the Sky"	2:55
6.	"Welcome to my Daydream"	3:30
7.	"Piano Concerto #1 Mvt. 2"	2:27
8.	"Piano Concerto #1 Mvt. 3"	2:20
9.	"Live for the Day"	3:36
10.	"Scriabin Etude OP. 42 No. 5"	1:48
11.	"Moracan Lullaby"	1:50
12.	"Departing for Eternity"	1:25
13.	"Cross the Bridge"	4:56
