= Jason Rullo =

American drummer (born 1972)

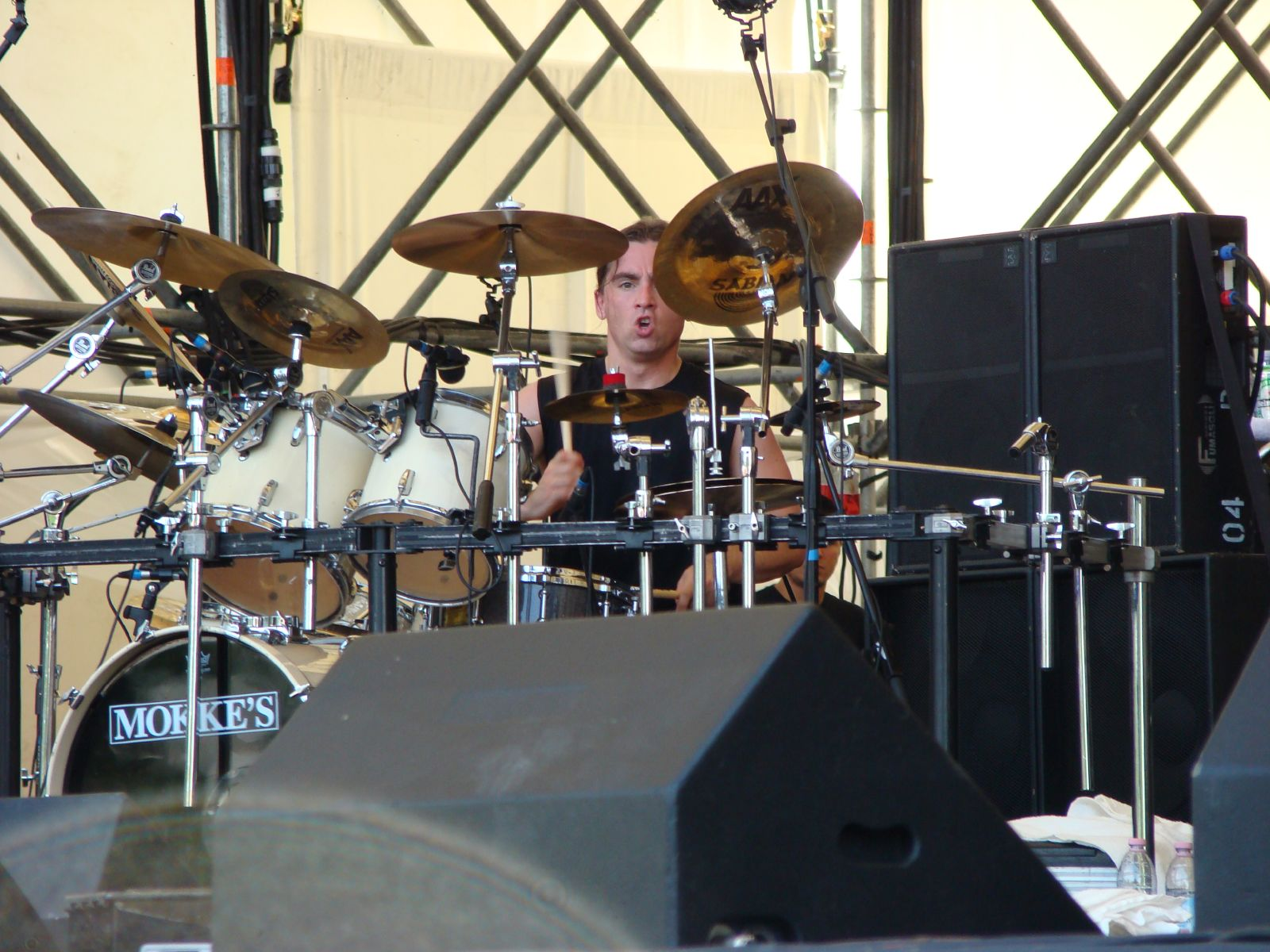
- Rullo performing live with Symphony X, 2007

Background information
- Birth name: Jason Rullo
- Born: Hackensack, New Jersey, U.S.
- Genres: Progressive metal, neoclassical metal
- Occupation: Musician
- Instrument: Drums
- Years active: 1994–present

Jason Rullo is an American drummer, and one of the founding members of progressive metal band Symphony X.

In 2003, he was featured in a readers' poll for Modern Drummer magazine, where he achieved two awards: second place in the up-and-coming drummer poll, and third place for best recorded performance on Symphony X's The Odyssey (2002). In the same year, he performed on the self-titled debut album by Redemption.

On February 27, 2013, it was announced by Symphony X's management that, during the previous week, Jason was admitted to hospital for heart failure. He spent a week in hospital, and was released after some days. Jason then started a rehab program, and has been told that his recovery will take a minimum of 3–6 months under doctors' care. On March 26, 2013, the band announced that John Macaluso would join them on tour for their South American and European dates, until Jason recovers from such health problems.

In 2019, Jason Rullo formed a new band by the name of "3 Rules" along with guitar player Ron Sanborn and bassist Artha Meadors. They released their debut album "Rule of 3" through a GoFundMe campaign in 2020. In an interview with Sonic Perspectives, Jason Rullo said "This is a real band, not just a project".

== Discography ==
=== Symphony X ===
- 1994: Symphony X
- 1995: The Damnation Game
- 1997: The Divine Wings of Tragedy
- 1999: Prelude to the Millennium (compilation)
- 2000: V: The New Mythology Suite
- 2001: Live on the Edge of Forever (live)
- 2002: The Odyssey
- 2007: Paradise Lost
- 2011: Iconoclast
- 2015: Underworld

=== Redemption ===
- 2003: Redemption

=== 3 Rules ===
- 2020: Rule of 3
