= John DeServio =

American bassist

John "JD" DeServio
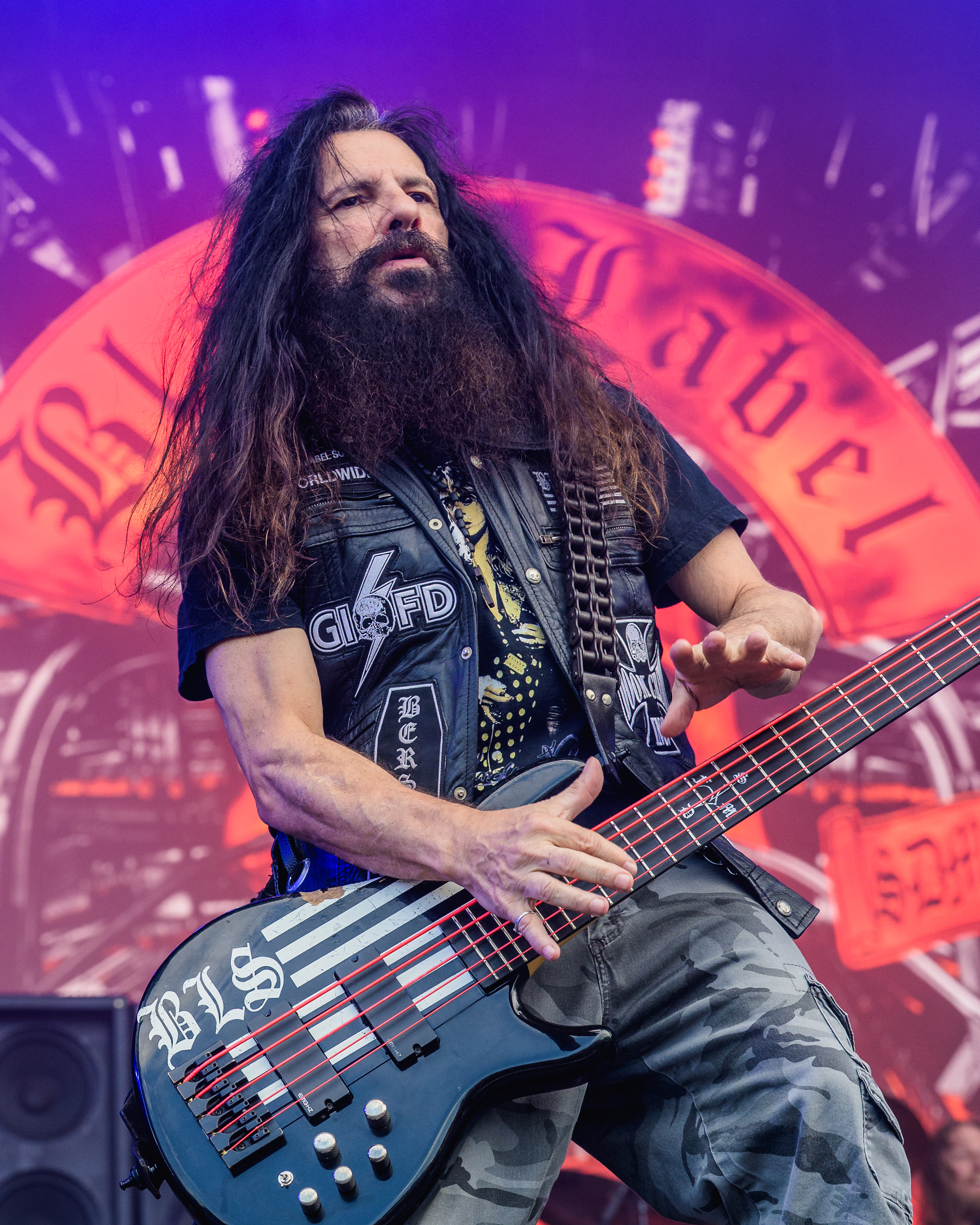
- DeServio with Black Label Society in 2026

Background information
- Born: John DeServio
- Genres: Hard rock, heavy metal
- Occupation: Bassist
- Years active: 1989–present
- Member of: Black Label Society
- Formerly of: Pride & Glory
- Website: johnjddeservio.com

John "JD" DeServio is an American musician who has been the bassist of heavy metal band Black Label Society since 2005. He was also a member of Pride & Glory, a southern rock trio, for a short time in December 1994 (again as a replacement for Lomenzo), and was Black Label Society's original bassist, playing on the tour supporting their debut album, Sonic Brew. DeServio also performed on Michael Romeo's solo albums War of the Worlds, Pt. 1 (2018) and War of the Worlds, Pt. 2 (2022).

DeServio has his own band called Cycle of Pain whose debut album was released in April 2009 via Reform Records. He endorses Schecter bass guitars and DR strings.

DeServio has been a resident of Keyport, New Jersey.
