= Atomic Soul =

Studio album by Russell Allen
- Released: April 26, 2005
- Recorded: 2004–2005
- Studio: The Dungeon
- Genre: Hard rock, heavy metal
- Length: 50:25
- Label: InsideOut Music
- Producer: Russell Allen

Atomic Soul is Symphony X's lead singer Russell Allen's debut solo album. It was released on April 26, 2005. The album is different from Symphony X's harder, more progressive sound, and has been dubbed by many, including Allen himself, as "Hard Rock". The album was released in 2005 on the InsideOut Music label. Allen played bass and keyboards on most tracks, along with vocals, but some of the tracks feature guests including Robert Nelson on drums, Brendan Anthony and Jason Freudberg on guitars, Larry Salvatore on bass and Jens Johansson on keyboards. Also Allen's bandmates Michael Romeo and Michael Pinnella, from Symphony X, are featured on the album.

== Reception ==
Professional ratings
Review scores
Source	Rating
Blabbermouth.net	8/10
Rock Hard	7.5/10

Blabbermouth.net wrote: "I'm not surprised that Allen crafted a strong '70s-inspired album. I'm just amazed at how flawlessly he pulled it off. Good stuff." Powermetal.de gave a positive review and said all the tracks on the album are strong. Vampster called it a great album and recommended it to fans of Soundgarden and Badlands.

== Track listing ==
All songs written by Russell Allen, except where noted.

1. Blackout - 4:25 (Allen, Brendan Anthony, Iceberg, Robert Nelson, Larry Salvatore)
2. Unjustified - 3:43 (Allen, Anthony, Nelson)
3. Voodoo Hand - 3:54
4. Angel - 5:14
5. The Distance - 4:49 (Allen, Anthony, Nelson)
6. Seasons of Insanity - 4:20
7. Gaia - 4:33
8. Loosin' You - 4:01
9. Saucey Jack - 4:02
10. We Will Fly - 7:55
11. Atomic Soul - 3:08

== Personnel ==
- Russell Allen: Vocals, Bass & Acoustic Guitars, Keyboards
- Brendan Anthony: Electric & Acoustic Guitars
- Jason Freudberg: Electric & Acoustic Guitars
- Iceberg: Electric & Acoustic Guitars
- Michael Romeo: Electric, Slide & Bass Guitars
- Larry Salvatore: Bass
- Michael Pinnella: Piano
- Jens Johansson: Keyboards
- Robert Nelson: Drums, Percussion

== Production ==
- Arranged By Russell Allen, Brendan Anthony & Robert Nelson
- Produced By Russell Allen
- Recorded & Engineered By Michael Romeo
- Mixed By Russell Allen & Don Sternecker
- Mastered By Allen Douches
