= The Divine Wings of Tragedy =

Studio album by Symphony X
- Released: November 13, 1996
- Studios: Trax East, South River, New Jersey; The Dungeon
- Genres: Progressive metal; neoclassical metal; power metal; symphonic metal
- Length: 65:23
- Label: Zero Corporation
- Producers: Steve Evetts, Eric Rachel

Symphony X chronology
The Damnation Game (1995)	The Divine Wings of Tragedy (1996)	Twilight in Olympus (1998)

The Divine Wings of Tragedy is the third studio album by American progressive metal band Symphony X, released in November 1996 through Zero Corporation (Japan), and March 1997 through Inside Out Music (Europe). A remastered edition was reissued on September 13, 2004, through Inside Out, and again in September 17, 2012, as part of a double-LP vinyl release.

== Reception ==
Professional ratings
Review scores
Source	Rating
AllMusic	4/5 stars
Rock Hard	9/10

Robert Taylor at AllMusic gave The Divine Wings of Tragedy four stars out of five, saying that "it was this release that propelled [Symphony X] to the forefront of progressive metal bands." He went on to say "While this recording may not be quite the classic that it is often heralded to be, it is a noteworthy addition to the annals of progressive metal." Praise was given to each musician for their technical craft, but Russell Allen's vocals were criticized as "a bit grating, often sounding too much like Ronnie James Dio." He also noted the album's title track containing excerpts from Johann Sebastian Bach's Mass in B Minor (1749) and Gustav Holst's The Planets (1914–16).

In 2005, The Divine Wings of Tragedy was ranked No. 433 in Rock Hard magazine's book of The 500 Greatest Rock & Metal Albums of All Time.

The album ranked number 17 in the list "Top 25 Progressive Metal Albums of All Time" by Loudwire. The same magazine named it in number 8 on "Top 25 Power Metal Albums of All Time" and number 10 on their list of 12 best progressive metal album of the 1990s. ThoughtCo also named it on its list "Essential Progressive Metal Albums". In 2020, Metal Hammer included it in their list of top 10 1997 albums. In 2021, they ranked it as the 15th best symphonic metal album of all time.

== Track listing ==
No.	Title	Lyrics	Music	Length
1.	"Of Sins and Shadows"	Thomas Miller	Michael Romeo, Michael Pinnella	4:58
2.	"Sea of Lies"	Russell Allen	Romeo, Pinnella, Miller	4:18
3.	"Out of the Ashes"	Allen	Romeo, Pinnella, Miller	3:40
4.	"The Accolade"	Allen	Romeo, Pinnella, Miller	9:51
5.	"Pharaoh"	Allen	Symphony X	5:28
6.	"The Eyes of Medusa"	Miller	Romeo, Pinnella, Miller	5:26
7.	"The Witching Hour"	Allen, Romeo	Romeo, Pinnella	4:15
8.	"The Divine Wings of Tragedy": "(Part I) At the Four Corners of the Earth"; "(Part II) In the Room of Thrones"; "(Part III) A Gathering of Angels"; "(Part IV) The Wrath Divine"; "(Part V) The Prophet's Cry"; "(Part VI) Bringer of the Apocalypse (Eve of Sacrifice / Armies in the Sky / Dies Irae)"; "(Part VII) Paradise Regained"	.: Romeo, Pinnella; (instrumental); Romeo; Romeo, Miller; Romeo; (instrumental); Allen, Pinnella	Romeo, Miller, Pinnella	20:42
9.	"Candlelight Fantasia" (moved to track 8 on the vinyl release)	Miller	Romeo, Pinella	6:45
Total length:				65:23

== Personnel ==
- Russell Allen – vocals
- Michael Romeo – guitar
- Michael Pinnella – keyboard
- Jason Rullo – drums
- Thomas Miller – bass

Technical personnel

- Michael Romeo – choir arrangement (track 8)
- Michael Pinnella – choir arrangement (track 8)
- Steve Evetts – engineering, mixing, mastering, production
- Eric Rachel – engineering, mastering, production
- Stephen Rajkumar – engineering assistance
- John Abbott – engineering assistance
- Donna Rachel – artwork
