= Russell Allen =

American singer

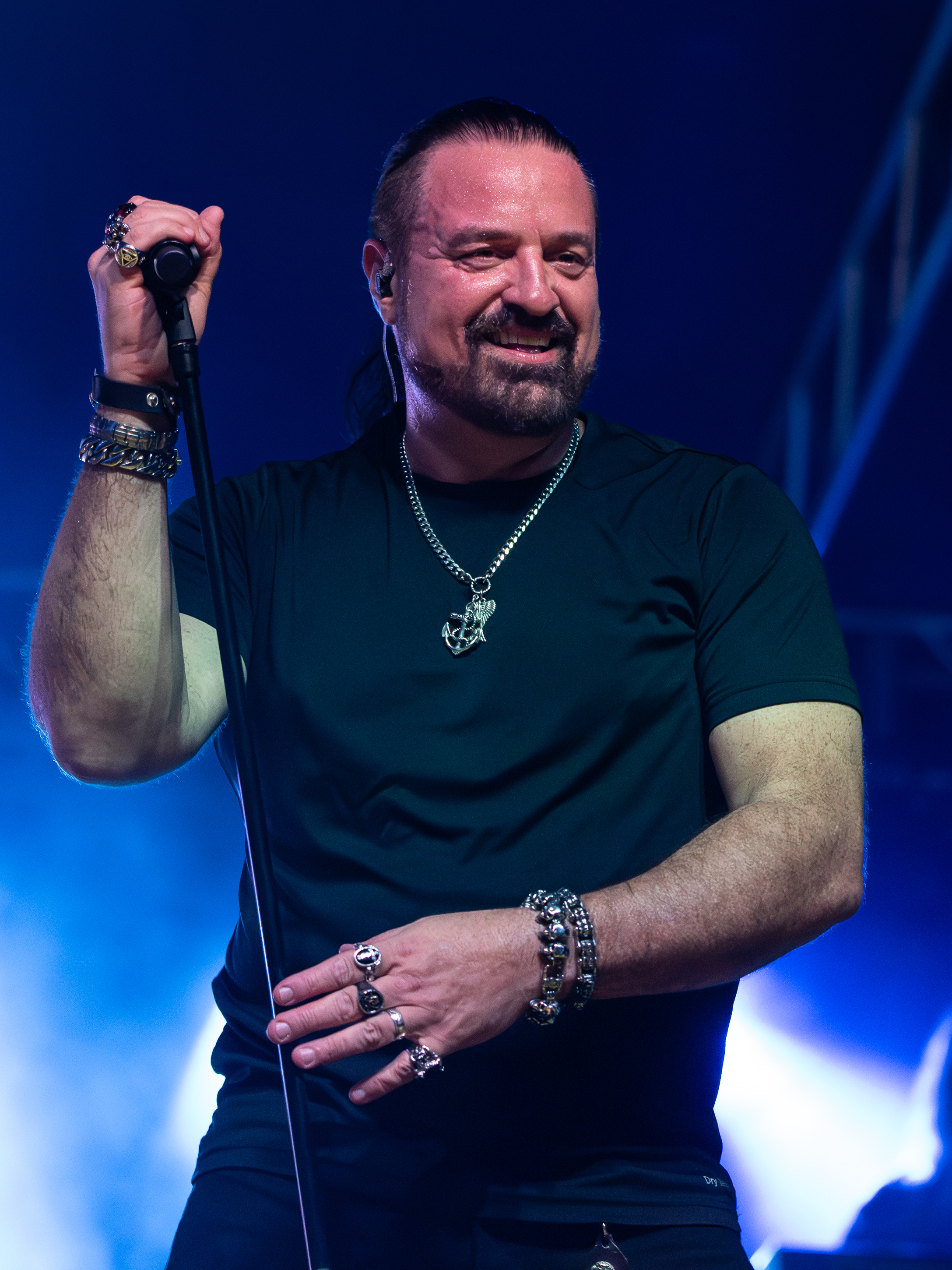
- Allen performing in 2024

Background information
- Born: July 19, 1971 (age 54); Long Beach, California, U.S.
- Genres: Progressive metal, power metal, hard rock
- Occupation(s): Musician, singer, songwriter
- Instrument(s): Vocals, bass guitar
- Years active: 1995–present
- Member of: Symphony X; Trans-Siberian Orchestra; Allen/Olzon
- Formerly of: Adrenaline Mob; Joel Hoekstra's 13

Russell Allen (born July 19, 1971) is an American singer best known as the vocalist of the progressive metal band Symphony X. He has also worked with the supergroups Star One, Allen-Lande, Adrenaline Mob, Level 10, and as one of fourteen vocalists in the progressive symphonic metal band Trans-Siberian Orchestra.

== Biography ==
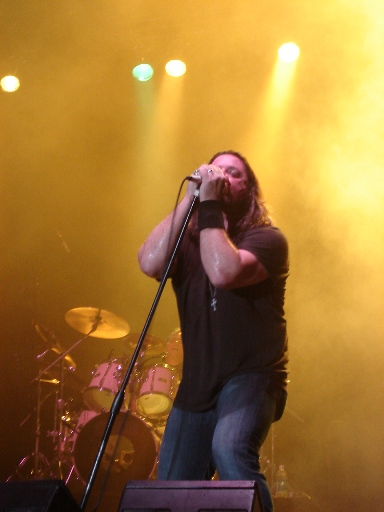
Allen during a Symphony X concert in San Juan, Puerto Rico, 2007

Before his music career began, Allen was a jouster at a Medieval Times Dinner Theater at the Lyndhurst, New Jersey location from 1990 to 2002. He also served as an assistant production manager. He was introduced to the band Symphony X by former singer Rod Tyler. Allen has been the lead singer of Symphony X since 1995, releasing eight studio albums and one live album with the band.

His first solo album, Atomic Soul, was released April 25, 2005. As well as singing he also plays the bass when performing songs from Atomic Soul live.

He is referred to in various circles as "Sir Russell Allen", and he is credited as such on Arjen Lucassen's Star One albums, because of a joke that Arjen made regarding Allen's former job as a jouster.

In the summer of 2005 he went on tour with Symphony X on Dave Mustaine's Gigantour alongside such bands as Dream Theater, Megadeth, and Nevermore. The same year, he also made part of a duo melodic rock project with singer Jørn Lande (ex-Masterplan) called Allen/Lande, which has four albums, all released by Frontiers Records.

In addition to being Symphony X vocalist, he is also currently working in another band with guitarist Mike Orlando called Adrenaline Mob.

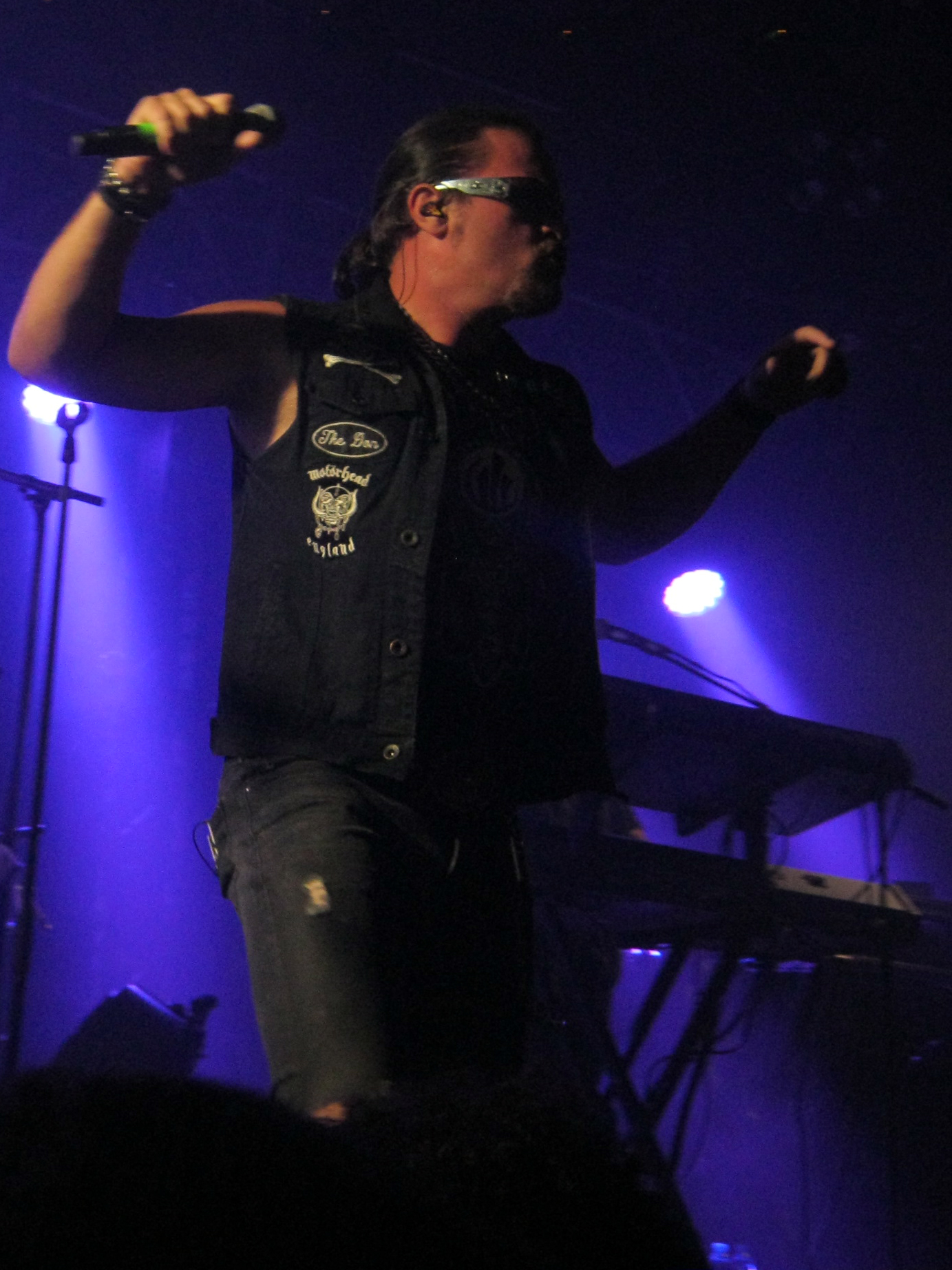
Allen with Symphony X in 2016

In November 2013, Allen joined Trans-Siberian Orchestra for their 2013 Fall/Winter tour and performed with the group at the Wacken Open Air 2015. He is also featured in their 2015 studio album Letters from the Labyrinth.

In 2014, a new project was announced, featuring Russell Allen with bassist Mat Sinner and other members of the German band Primal Fear, called Level 10, with an album release slated for January 2015. The release date and the name of the album were revealed in November 2013: it would be titled as Chapter One, to be released on January 23, 2015, in Europe and on January 27, 2014, in North America via Frontiers Music srl.

In 2015, Russell Allen recorded vocals for a new project of Whitesnake and former Night Ranger guitarist Joel Hoekstra called Joel Hoekstra's 13, with an album called Dying to Live, released on October 16. Russell sings lead vocals on half of the songs in the album with background vocals and the other half of lead vocals recorded by Jeff Scott Soto.

In 2020, Russell Allen collaborated with former Nightwish vocalist Anette Olzon on a new a duo melodic rock project under the name Allen/Olzon. Worlds Apart, their debut album, was released on March 6, 2020.

== Musical style ==
Multi-instrumentalist, singer and composer Arjen Lucassen has said the following regarding Russell Allen:

Russell has a very powerful and versatile voice, and on top of that he is a great musician and performer. Russell was one of the few singers with whom I didn't need to be present during recording, but when on the phone he let me hear the parts he had sung, my eyes filled with tears. Russell thought I was joking, but I was truly moved! At the moment Russell is one of the best singers in the world. And he proved that during the Star One tour.

Allen has worked with Lucassen on various occasions: originally he sang the song "Dawn of a Million Souls" on Ayreon's 2000 album Universal Migrator Part 2: Flight of the Migrator (which also featured a guitar solo by Michael Romeo), and in 2002 he became one of the lead vocalists for Lucassen's project Star One.

Allen has stated in an interview that "Ronnie James Dio is definitely at the top of my list of influences" and also mentioned Bruce Dickinson of Iron Maiden and former Free and Bad Company singer Paul Rodgers as influences.

== Personal life ==
While beginning work at the Medieval Times in 1990, he met his future wife. The couple later had a daughter in 2008.

== Discography ==
Studio albums:

- Atomic Soul (2005)

=== Symphony X ===
Studio albums:

- The Damnation Game (1995)
- The Divine Wings of Tragedy (1997)
- Twilight in Olympus (1998)
- V – The New Mythology Suite (2000)
- The Odyssey (2002)
- Paradise Lost (2007)
- Iconoclast (2011)
- Underworld (2015)

Live albums:

- Live on the Edge of Forever (2001)

=== Star One ===
Studio albums:

- Space Metal (2002)
- Victims of the Modern Age (2010)
- Revel in Time (2022)

Live albums:

- Live on Earth (2003)

=== Allen/Lande ===
Studio albums:

- The Battle (2005)
- The Revenge (2007)
- The Showdown (2010)
- The Great Divide (2014)

=== Adrenaline Mob ===
Studio albums:

- Omertà (2012)
- Men of Honor (2014)
- We The People (2017)

EPs:

- Adrenaline Mob (2011)
- Covertà (2013)
- Dearly Departed (2015)

=== Level 10 ===
Studio albums:

- Chapter One (2015)

=== Joel Hoekstra's 13 ===
Studio albums:

- Dying to Live (2015)
- Running Games (2021)

=== Allen/Olzon ===
Studio albums:

- Worlds Apart (2020)
- Army of Dreamers (2022)
