= Michael Romeo =

American guitarist (born 1968)

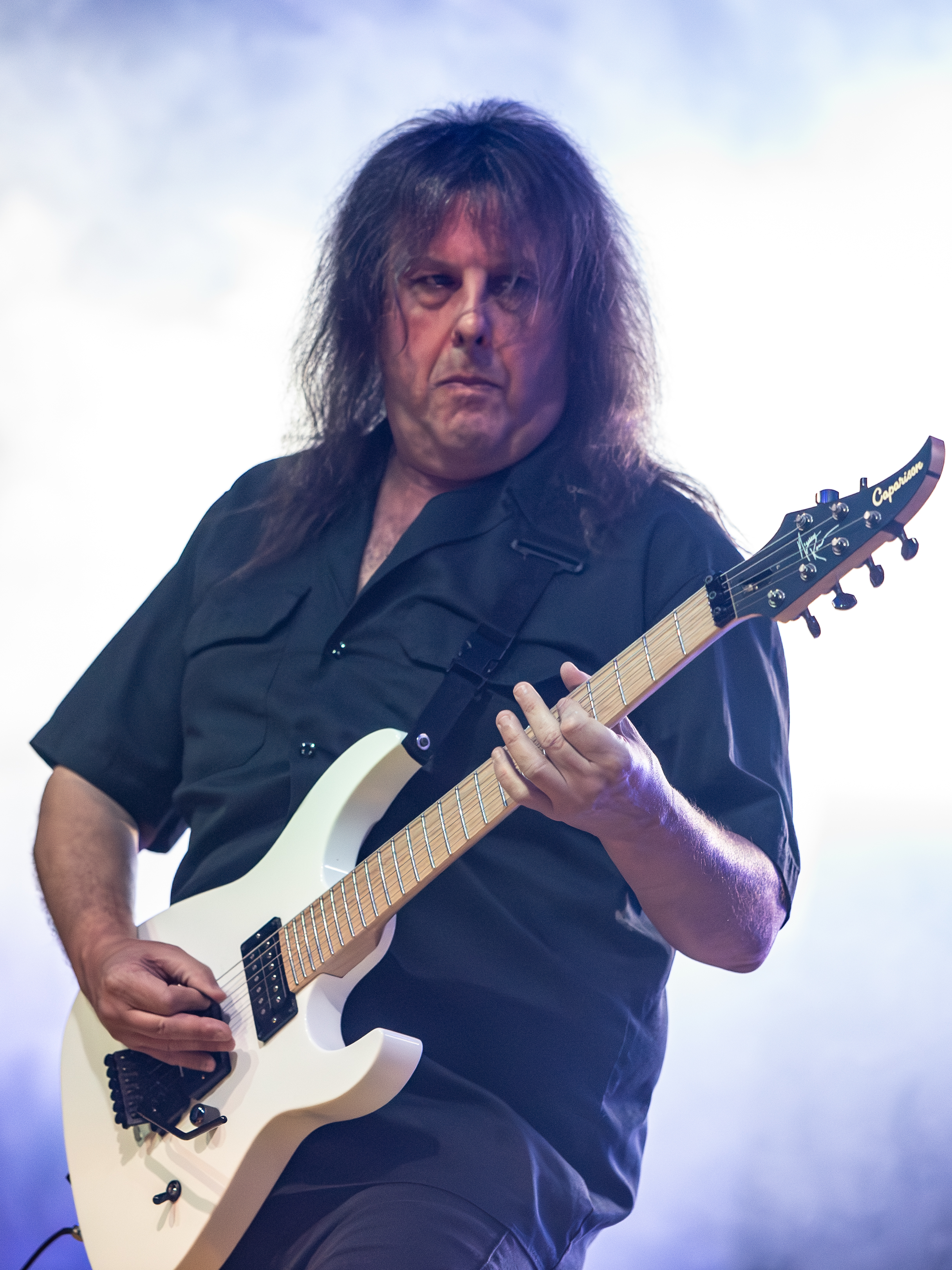
- Romeo performing in 2024

Background information
- Also known as: The Maestro
- Born: Michael James Romeo; March 6, 1968 (age 58); New York, U.S.
- Genres: Progressive metal, symphonic metal, neoclassical metal
- Occupations: Musician, songwriter, composer, record producer
- Instruments: Guitar, keyboards, backing vocals
- Years active: 1992–present
- Member of: Symphony X

Michael James Romeo (born March 6, 1968) is an American guitarist who is the founding member and main songwriter of the progressive metal group Symphony X. He is one of two members to appear on every Symphony X release, alongside Michael Pinnella.

Romeo is known for his speed and precision on the guitar, having been praised for his "pyrotechnic displays" on the instrument. He is also known for his unique style of tapping.

Romeo was ranked #91 out of 100 Greatest Heavy Metal Guitarists of All Time by Guitar World, and has influenced a number of younger players, including DragonForce's Herman Li, who listed Romeo among his favorite guitarists in 2011.

== Early life and influences ==
Romeo's music training began with piano lessons at the age of 10. His parents owned a piano, and a piano teacher would visit the house once per week. He also played clarinet in a school concert band. Through lessons, Romeo was introduced to classical composers such as Johann Sebastian Bach, Wolfgang Amadeus Mozart, Ludwig van Beethoven, Richard Wagner, Gustav Holst and Igor Stravinsky.

After hearing to his first Kiss album, Romeo purchased a cheap acoustic guitar at a garage sale and began practicing. He started seriously learning guitar around the age of 12 after listening to Ozzy Osbourne's albums Blizzard of Ozz and Diary of a Madman, and would subsequently be heavily influenced by the playing of Randy Rhoads. In a 2022 interview with Sea of Tranquility, Romeo would recall practicing daily at that point in his life, by playing along to the Ozzy Osbourne albums and others.

Romeo has listed various guitar players as influences on his playing, but cited Rhoads, Al Di Meola, Yngwie Malmsteen, and Uli Jon Roth as his main ones. Romeo's other favorite players include Marty Friedman, Shawn Lane and Ritchie Blackmore, while he has listed the bands Rush, Black Sabbath, Judas Priest, Deep Purple, Emerson, Lake & Palmer and Kansas as influential on him. Romeo is also a fan of composers of film scores, such as Bernard Herrmann and Hans Zimmer, and in particular John Williams.

== Equipment ==
Caparison Dellinger Prominence-MJR
- Manufacturer: Caparison Guitars
- Period: 2005–present

Construction
- Body type: Solid
- Neck joint: Bolt-on
- Scale: 648 mm (25 1/2 in)

Woods
- Body: Mahogany
- Neck: Maple and Walnut
- Fretboard: Maple

Hardware
- Bridge: Schaller S-FRT II (Floyd Rose type)
- Pickup(s): 2 Humbuckers; Neck: DiMarzio Tone Zone; Bridge: DiMarzio X2N

Colors available
- White

Romeo's first serious guitar was a white Kramer Pacer, and he has also used Fender Stratocasters. Romeo began his career with Symphony X using ESP M-II Deluxe guitars with EMG Active pickups, and later switching to the DiMarzio Tone Zone and X2N pickups. In 2005, Romeo was introduced to Caparison by Henrik Danhage of Evergrey. Caparison developed a custom model Dellinger Prominence-MJR, which Romeo has since used as his primary guitar. The guitar was used to record the 2007 Symphony X album Paradise Lost, and all subsequent releases from the band. Romeo has also played a Dellinger Prominence 7, which can be heard on War of the Worlds, Pt. 2.

In the studio Romeo has used Mesa Boogie Triaxis amplifiers, before switching to the ENGL Fireball around the time of Symphony X's The Odyssey. Romeo has continued to use ENGL's Fireball and Powerball amplifiers in the studio and for live performances. Throughout his career, Romeo has also used various Line 6 and Marshall amplifiers.

In terms of effects for live performances, Romeo pairs his various amplifiers with a TC Electronic "G System", a Boss NS2 Noisegate, an Ibanez Tube Screamer and a Boss Acoustic Simulator.

== Solo and guest work ==
In 1994, Romeo's solo debut The Dark Chapter was released.

In 1995, Long Island Records of Germany released the self-titled debut Phantom's Opera album featuring Romeo on lead guitar, Colie Brice on vocals, Bob Nelson on drums, Eric Walz on bass, and founding member Jack Young on keyboard and piano. The album was reissued with bonus tracks by Rewind in the US in 1999.

In 1999, Romeo provided all guitar and bass parts on The Last Viking, the third studio album from Johansson brothers Jens and Anders.

In 2000, Romeo played a guest solo on the song "Dawn of a Million Souls" from Ayreon's album Universal Migrator Part 2: Flight of the Migrator. Romeo has been a frequent guest collaborator with Arjen Lucassen, having also contributed guest solos on the songs "E=MC²" from Ayreon's 2008 release 01011001, and "Fate of Man" from Star One's 2022 release Revel in Time, a side project of Lucassen's.

In 2002, Romeo provided guitar parts for five songs from Kotipelto's Waiting for the Dawn. He would go on to provide guitar work on seven songs from their 2004 followup, Coldness.

In 2003, Redemption's self-titled release featured contributions from Romeo on the first four songs of the album.

In 2004, Romeo contributed guitar work for Vitalij Kuprij on his song "Piano Overture" from the album Forward and Beyond.

In 2005, Romeo provided guitar, bass and orchestration for eight songs from Symphony X bandmate Russell Allen's solo debut, Atomic Soul. Romeo also recorded and served as engineer on the record. The same year, Romeo provided orchestration work on three songs of Steve Walsh's solo album Shadowman, and on all songs from The Bronx Casket Co.'s Hellectric. Romeo would work with The Bronx Casket Co. again in 2011, providing lead guitar work on Antihero.

In 2007, Romeo arranged orchestral parts for the album Beautiful Tragedy by American band In This Moment.

In 2009, Romeo composed and recorded orchestral parts for "The Discovery" and "Gaia (The Vultures)" on God Forbid's album Earthsblood. Symphony X bandmate Michael Pinnella also contributed to two songs on the release.

In 2013, Romeo recorded some solos and guitar work for the self-titled debut album of Michael Kaplan's progressive rock project Flaud Logic. He also made a guest appearance on the new Pat Gesualdo album, Iceland.

In 2014, Romeo engineered and provided drum programming and some guitar work for Symphony X bandmate Michael LePond's project Mike LePond's Silent Assassins. Romeo would provide the same for Pawn and Prophecy and Whore of Babylon, released by Mike LePond's Silent Assassins in 2018 and 2020 respectively.

In early 2018, Romeo announced the release of a new full-length solo album called War of the Worlds, Pt. 1, featuring Rick Castellano (vocals), John "JD" DeServio (bass) and John Macaluso (drums) as the backing band. It was released on July 27 via Mascot Label Group. A sequel album, War of the Worlds, Pt. 2 was released in March 2022 through Inside Out, with Dino Jelusick replacing Castellano on vocals.

== Discography ==
=== Solo ===
- The Dark Chapter (1994)
- War of the Worlds, Pt. 1 (2018)
- War of the Worlds, Pt. 2 (2022)

=== With Phantom's Opera ===
- Phantom's Opera (1995)

=== With Johansson ===
- The Last Viking (1999)

=== With Mike LePond's Silent Assassins ===
- Mike LePond's Silent Assassins (2014)
- Pawn And Prophecy (2018)
- Whore of Babylon (2020)

=== As a guest ===
==== With Whiplash ====
- "Strike Me Blind" (Thrashback) – Whiplash (1998)

==== With Arjen Lucassen ====
- "Dawn of a Million Souls" (Universal Migrator Part 2: Flight of the Migrator) – Ayreon (2000)
- "E=mc²" (01011001) – Ayreon (2008)
- "Fate of Man" (Revel in Time) – Star One (2022)

==== With Kotipelto ====
- Various (Waiting for the Dawn) – Kotipelto (2002)
- Various (Coldness) – Kotipelto (2004)

==== With Redemption ====
- "Desperation (Part I-IV)" (Redemption) – Redemption (2003)

==== With Thunderstone ====
- "Drawn to the Flame" (The Burning) – Thunderstone (2004)

==== With Vitalij Kuprij ====
- "Piano Overture" (Forward and Beyond) – Vitalij Kuprij (2004)

==== With Russell Allen ====
- Various (Atomic Soul) – Russell Allen (2005)

==== With Steve Walsh ====
- Various (Shadowman) – Steve Walsh (2005)

==== With The Bronx Casket Co. ====
- Various (Hellectric) – The Bronx Casket Co. (2005)
- Various (Antihero) – The Bronx Casket Co. (2011)

==== With Eidolon ====
- "Arcturus #9" (The Parallel Otherworld) – Eidolon (2006)

==== With In This Moment ====
- Various (Beautiful Tragedy) – In This Moment (2007)

==== With God Forbid ====
- Various (Earthsblood) – God Forbid (2009)

==== With Lion's Share ====
- "Behind the Curtain" (Dark Hours) – Lion's Share (2009)

==== With Mike Orlando ====
- "Full Speed X" (Sonic Stomp II) – Mike Orlando (2010)

==== With Flaud Logic ====
- Various (Flaud Logic) – Flaud Logic (2013)

==== With Michael Angelo Batio ====
- "Juggernaut" (Intermezzo) – Michael Angelo Batio (2013)

==== With Pat Gesualdo ====
- Various (Iceland) – Pat Gesualdo (2013)

==== With DGM ====
- "Dogma" (The Passage) – DGM (2016)

==== With Mari Hamada ====
- "Orience" (Gracia) – Mari Hamada (2018)

==== With Verni ====
- Various (Barricade) – Verni (2018)
