= Michael Pinnella =

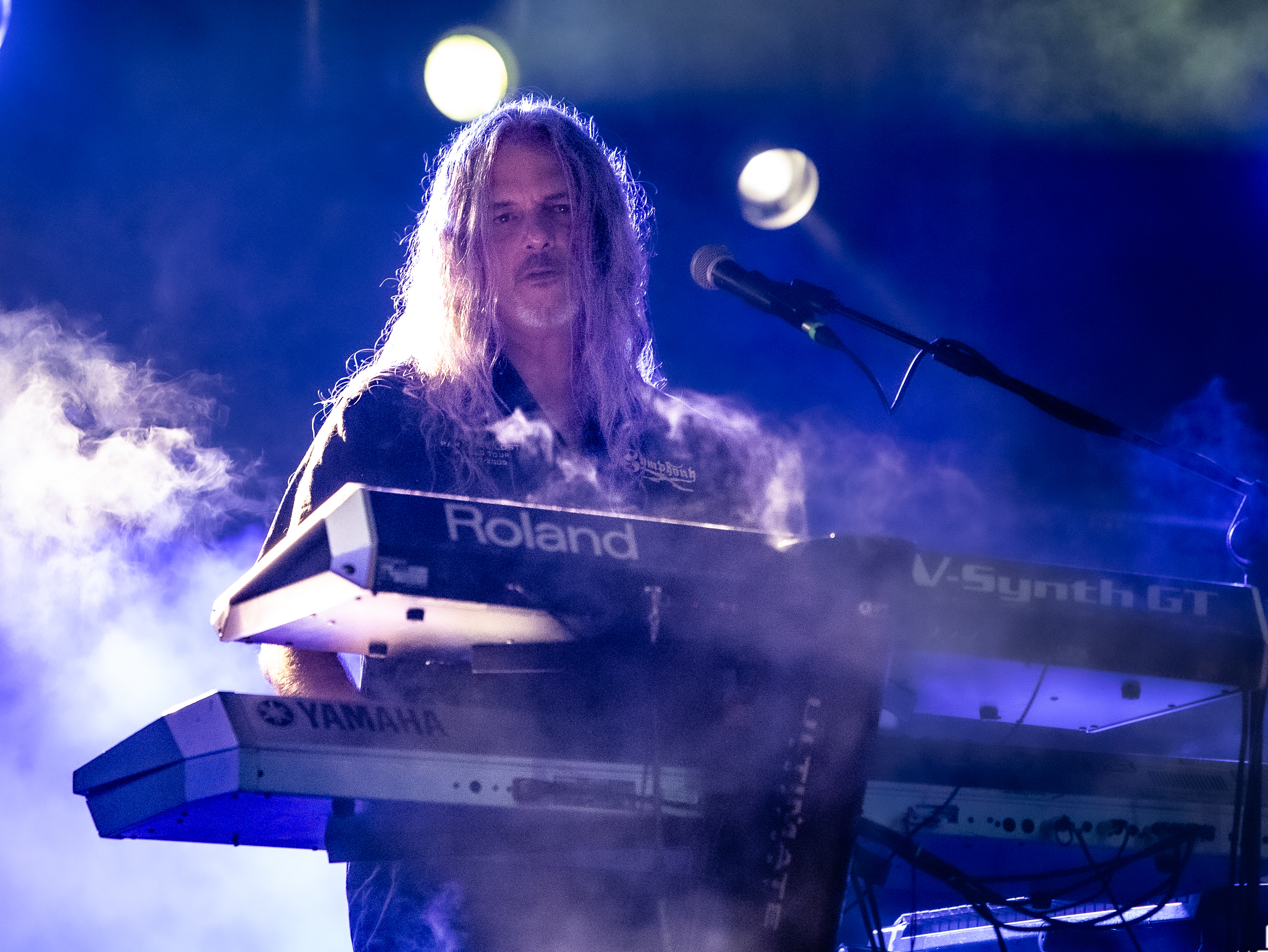
- Pinnella performing with Symphony X in 2024

Background information
- Born: Michael Pinnella; August 29, 1969 (age 56); Point Pleasant Beach, New Jersey, U.S.
- Genres: Progressive metal, neoclassical metal, power metal
- Occupations: Musician, songwriter
- Instruments: Keyboards, piano, backing vocals
- Years active: 1994–present
- Member of: Symphony X

Michael Pinnella (born August 29, 1969) is an American keyboard player, most notably for the band Symphony X. Michael is one of two Symphony X members to appear on all nine of the band's albums (the other being Michael Romeo).

He has released two solo albums, titled Enter By the Twelfth Gate (2004) and Ascension (2014), mostly composed of instrumental, classical-styled progressive metal.

In 2016, Pinnella ranked #11 in Loudwire's Top 25 Rock + Metal Keyboardists of All Time, praised for being an "essential component of Symphony X’s overarching epic nature".

== Biography ==
Pinnella was born in Point Pleasant Beach, New Jersey and was encouraged since childhood to follow music. When he was four years old, he started taking piano lessons. He was heavily influenced by classic composers like Mozart, Beethoven, Chopin, and Bach.

When he was about 11 years old, he started to practice more seriously. Later in his youth, he was impressed by Yngwie Malmsteen and asked his parents to buy him a keyboard. When he got into college, he studied piano performance, theory and composition, and other musical courses. Other influences came from progressive/metal bands from the 1970s (Emerson, Lake & Palmer, Deep Purple, Black Sabbath) and from the 1980s (DIO, Ozzy Osbourne).

When Pinnella finished college, he started teaching piano in a music store. One of the fellow teachers at the store was friends with Michael Romeo from Symphony X. In 1994, he was hired by the band as a keyboardist.

Pinnella's nephew, Chris Pinnella, is a vocalist who worked with Trans-Siberian Orchestra.

== Equipment ==
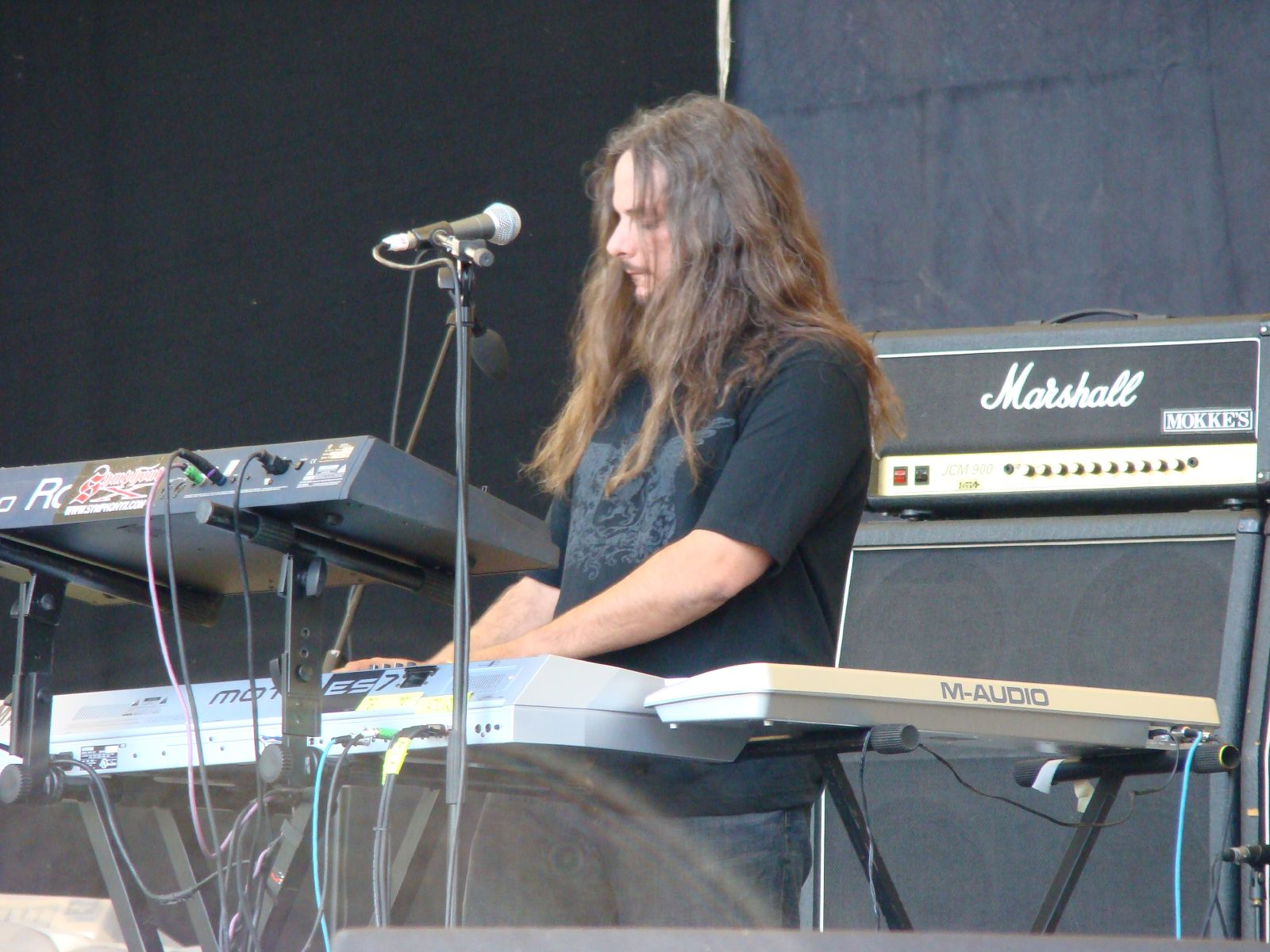
Michael Pinnella with Symphony X at Gods of Metal 2007

Pinnella uses the following equipment:

- Yamaha Motif ES7
- Roland V-Synth GT

== Discography ==
=== With Michael Romeo ===
- The Dark Chapter (1994)

=== Solo ===
- Enter by the Twelfth Gate (2004)
- Ascension (2014)

=== With Mike LePond's Silent Assassins ===
- Mike LePond's Silent Assassins (2014)
- Pawn And Prophecy (2018)
- Whore of Babylon (2020)

=== As a guest ===
- Various (Cult of One) – Whiplash (1996)
- "Strike Me Blind" (Thrashback) – Whiplash (1998)
- Various (Gone Forever) – God Forbid (2004)
- "We Will Fly" (Atomic Soul) – Russell Allen (2005)
- Various (Earthsblood) – God Forbid (2009)
- "A Vision of You" (Sonic Stomp II) – Mike Orlando (2010)
- "Sirius" (A Spoonful of Time) – Nektar (2012)

== See also ==
- Symphony X
