= Neoclassical metal =

Subgenre of heavy metal combining classical music and speed metal

- Stylistic origins: Heavy metal; classical; speed metal
- Cultural origins: Late 1970s and early 1980s, Europe and North America
- Derivative forms: Power metal; symphonic metal

Other topics
- Avant-garde metal; progressive metal; shred guitar

Neoclassical metal is a style of heavy metal that is heavily influenced by classical music and usually features very technical playing, (Note: "L'arrivée du néoclassique remet au goût du jour la virtuosité et le travail de l'instrument", "Les secrets du metal- Etudes de Style", March 2009, p.14) consisting of elements borrowed from both classical and speed metal music. Yngwie Malmsteen became one of the most notable musicians in the style, and contributed greatly to its development in the 1980s. (Note: "C'est véritablement en 1984, avec son premier album solo "Rising Force", que le virtuose suédois Yngwie Malmsteen fait découvrir au monde son mélange unique de baroque et de heavy metal", "Les secrets du metal- Etudes de Style", March 2009, p.14) Other notable players in the genre are Randy Rhoads, Luca Turilli, Michael Romeo,Jason Becker, Vinnie Moore, Alexi Laiho, Jani Liimatainen, Kiko Loureiro, Uli Jon Roth, Stéphan Forté, Wolf Hoffmann, Timo Tolkki, Syu and Marty Friedman. (Note: "Toute un pléiade de guitars heroes va deferler, pour la plupart révélés par le label Shrapel records, parmi lesquels les plus légendaires sont John Petrucci, Jason Becker, Jacky Vincent, Tony MacAlpine, Timo Tolkki et Vinnie Moore", "Les secrets du metal- Etudes de Style", March 2009, p.14)

Although the style is mainly associated with guitarists (especially lead guitarists), keyboardists like Jens Johansson, Vitalij Kuprij, Michael Pinnella, Alex Staropoli and Janne Wirman are also prominent figures in it.

== Definition ==
Neoclassical metal takes its name from a broad conception of classical music. In this it is a concept distinct from how neoclassicism is understood within the classical music tradition. Neoclassical music usually refers to a movement in musical modernism which developed roughly a century after the end of the Classical period and peaked during the years between the two World Wars.

On the other hand, neoclassical metal music does not restrict itself to a return to classical aesthetic ideals, such as equilibrium and formalism. Its influences include both the Romantic musical period and the Baroque period of the seventeenth and first half of the eighteenth centuries. The music of late Baroque composers such as Vivaldi, Handel and Bach was often highly ornate. Neoclassical metal musicians such as Yngwie Malmsteen are inspired by this aspect of Baroque music (Note: "C'est véritablement en 1984, avec son premier album solo "Rising Force", que le virtuose suédois Yngwie Malmsteen fait découvrir au monde son mélange unique de baroque et de heavy metal", "Les secrets du metal- Etudes de Style", March 2009, p.14) and also by later composers such as the violinist Niccolò Paganini in using runs and other decorative and showy techniques in their performances. Neoclassical metal music thus looks to classical music as broadly understood by the general public and not to the more specialist technical definition used within classical circles.

== History of the style and influences ==
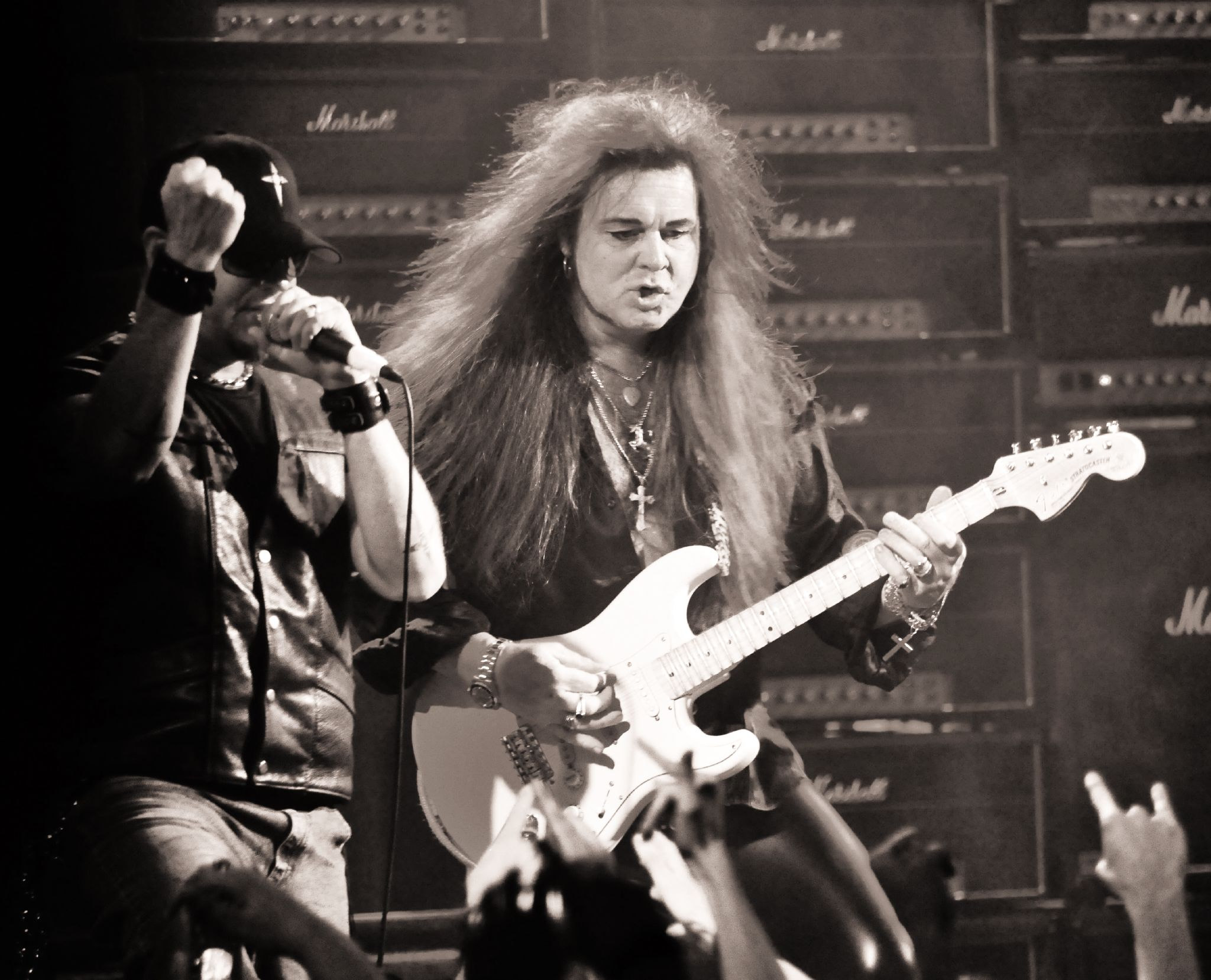
Yngwie Malmsteen (to the right of Tim Owens), a key figure in neoclassical metal

Since the 1960s and 1970s, many works contributed to influence neoclassical metal, Deep Purple's Concerto for Group and Orchestra being the most important one. Other bands, like Rainbow, also featured neoclassical influences. Early classical influences within hard rock and heavy metal are most notably found in the playing of Jon Lord, Keith Emerson, Ritchie Blackmore, Uli Jon Roth and Randy Rhoads. But it was in the 1980s that neoclassical guitar playing made its way from hard rock into heavy metal. (Note: "C'est véritablement en 1984, avec son premier album solo "Rising Force", que le virtuose suédois Yngwie Malmsteen fait découvrir au monde son mélange unique de baroque et de heavy metal", "Les secrets du metal- Etudes de Style", March 2009, p.14)

Heavy metal guitar technique developed rapidly from its late-1960s beginnings to its late-1980s peak, but before the 1980s, few metal guitarists had displayed the advanced technical proficiency which is a hallmark of the neoclassical metal style. The popularization and growth of neoclassical metal is closely related to the ascension of the guitar "shredding" movement.

The "golden age" of neoclassical metal in the middle to late 1980s revolved around the sizeable roster of flashy electric-guitar soloists who recorded mostly instrumental albums for Mike Varney's Shrapnel Records label. Swedish guitarist Yngwie Malmsteen, widely regarded as the originator (Note: "Si l'on peut clairement considérer Randy Rhoads, Uli Jon Roth et Ritchie Blackmore, comme les précurseurs, c'est véritablement en 1984, [...] que le virtuose suédois Yngwie Malmsteen fait découvrir au monde son mélange unique de baroque et de heavy metal", "Les secrets du metal- Etudes de Style", March 2009, p.14) and still-reigning king of neoclassical metal, was brought to the United States by Varney to sign with Shrapnel Records in 1982.

Many subsequent Shrapnel artists, (Note: "Toute une pléiade de guitars heroes va déferler, pour la plupart révélés par le label Shrapnel Records, parmi lesquels les plus légendaires sont Jason Becker, Tony McAlpine et Vinnie Moore", "Les secrets du metal- Etudes de Style", March 2009, p.14) including Tony MacAlpine, Vinnie Moore, Joey Tafolla, Michael Angelo Batio, Paul Gilbert, David T. Chastain, Jason Becker, Marty Friedman, and, most famously, Joe Satriani and Steve Vai emerged in the latter 1980s as exemplars of the neoclassical style.

== Styles and theory ==
A common feature of neoclassical metal is the diminished seventh chord. It can be a useful tool for modulation, as it's possible to move by minor thirds through the chord, then use the diminished 7th as a leading tone to resolve to the tonic. Pentatonic scales are also prevalent (as in the vast majority of rock and metal styles). A scale often used by neoclassical metal musicians is the harmonic minor scale, which is similar to the natural minor, but has a raised 7th (in the case of E, the D goes to D♯).

Modes are also used on occasion.

== See also ==
- Cello rock
