= Platinum & Gold Collection (The Verve Pipe album) =

Greatest hits album by The Verve Pipe
- Released: March 9, 2004
- Genre: Alternative rock
- Label: RCA Records

The Verve Pipe chronology
Underneath (2001)	Platinum & Gold Collection (2004)	A Homemade Holiday (2007)

Professional ratings
Review scores
Source	Rating
Allmusic	link

Platinum & Gold Collection is a 2004 compilation album by The Verve Pipe released by their record company RCA Records in their ongoing Platinum & Gold Collection series. There are no songs from I've Suffered a Head Injury and no new songs overall; the song "Spoonful of Sugar" from Pop Smear is a live version. The album was repackaged in 2007 as Super Hits.

== Track listing ==
1. "Photograph"
2. "The Freshmen"
3. "Hero"
4. "Never Let You Down"
5. "Villains"
6. "Cup of Tea"
7. "Penny Is Poison"
8. "Kiss Me Idle"
9. "La La"
10. "Happiness Is"
11. "Colorful"
12. "Spoonful of Sugar" (live)
