= Underneath (The Verve Pipe album) =

Studio album by The Verve Pipe
- Released: September 18, 2001
- Genre: Alternative rock
- Length: 44:45
- Label: RCA
- Producer: Adam Schlesinger

The Verve Pipe chronology
The Verve Pipe (1999)	Underneath (2001)	Platinum & Gold Collection (2004)

Singles from Underneath
- 1. "Never Let You Down" Released: 2001

Professional ratings
Aggregate scores
Source	Rating
Metacritic	63/100
Review scores
Source	Rating
AllMusic	4.5/5 stars
The Encyclopedia of Popular Music	3/5 stars
Rolling Stone	(Not Rated)

Underneath is the fourth studio album by The Verve Pipe, released in 2001. Produced by Adam Schlesinger, the album's power-pop sound was a departure from the darker, textured sonics of The Verve Pipe and Villains. "Never Let You Down", the album's lead single, was one of the Top 50 Most Played songs for Adult Top 40 and Modern A/C radio in 2001.

The song "Colorful" appears in the 2001 movie Rock Star, in which lead singer Brian Vander Ark provided a singing voice for Mark Wahlberg's title character. Vander Ark also portrayed Ricki Bell in the movie, a bassist for fictional heavy metal band Blood Pollution.

== Critical reception ==
Billboard praised the album's turn to "power-pop territory," and wrote that singer Brian Vander Ark "has never sounded more like Peter Gabriel, and we mean that in a good way." The South Bend Tribune wrote that "Vander Ark writes five of the songs on Underneath, and drummer Donny Brown writes four of them, and the differences between them help to make Underneath a constantly shifting tilt of emotions and, probably, a much better album than if just one of them had been the main songwriter." The Detroit Free Press called the album "the best stuff the group has concocted in half a decade."

== Track listing ==
No.	Title	Writer(s)	Length
1.	"Only Words"	Brian Vander Ark	3:36
2.	"Never Let You Down"	Donny Brown	3:35
3.	"I Want All of You"	Brown, Adam Schlesinger	4:16
4.	"Miles Away"	Brian Vander Ark	4:44
5.	"Happiness Is"	Brown	3:33
6.	"Medicate Myself"	Brown	4:50
7.	"Gotta Move On"	Brown	3:42
8.	"Local Boys"	Brian Vander Ark	3:57
9.	"Colorful"	Brian Vander Ark	4:27
10.	"Wonderful Waste"	Brian Vander Ark, Schlesinger	4:33
11.	"Underneath"	Brian Vander Ark	3:31
Total length:			44:45

== Personnel ==
The Verve Pipe

- Brian Vander Ark – lead vocals, guitars
- Donny Brown – drums, percussion, backing vocals
- A.J. Dunning – guitars, backing vocals
- Doug Corella – keyboards, percussion, backing vocals

Additional contributors

- Brad Vander Ark – bass
- Adam Schlesinger – production, bass, additional keyboards
- Andrew Bird – violin
- Craig Griffith – harmonica
- Chris Shaw – mixing
- John Holbrook – mixing, engineering
- Laurent Cecile – assistant engineering
- Jon Frazer – additional guitars
- Richard Furch – assistant engineering
- Bojan Dugich – assistant engineering
- Ted Jensen – mastering
