= The Verve Pipe (album) =

Studio album by The Verve Pipe
- Released: July 27, 1999
- Genre: Alternative rock, post-grunge
- Length: 45:35
- Label: RCA Records
- Producer: Michael Beinhorn

The Verve Pipe chronology
Villains (1996)	The Verve Pipe (1999)	Underneath (2001)

Singles from The Verve Pipe
- 1. "Hero" Released: 1999

Professional ratings
Review scores
Source	Rating
AllMusic	3/5 stars
Rolling Stone	2/5 stars

The Verve Pipe is the third studio album by American rock band the Verve Pipe, released on July 27, 1999. The band's second release for RCA Records, the album followed the platinum-selling Villains and its mammoth single, "The Freshmen". The band worked with Soundgarden producer Michael Beinhorn and created a generally dark, sonically textured grunge-pop album. The lead single "Hero" received sporadic airplay on alternative rock radio and its video was in rotation on MTV2 in late summer 1999.

Throughout the album, primary songwriter and singer Brian Vander Ark comments on the fleeting nature of fame with tracks such as "Supergig" and "Headlines". The song "The F Word" serves as a bittersweet response to the band's success with "The Freshmen".

The album's cover features a diagram for frog dissection, with the song titles used as references to various body parts.

== Radio and touring ==
The Verve Pipe mounted a major nationwide tour in support of The Verve Pipe and lead single "Hero", headlining mid-size venues and playing numerous radio festivals throughout 1999 and into 2000. With the Nu metal stylings of Limp Bizkit and Korn dominating rock radio airwaves, "Hero" failed to connect with a mass audience. The band responded by releasing the album's sonically heaviest track, "Television", as a follow-up single. With no music video and little radio support, "Television" sputtered out quickly, along with record sales.

== Track listing ==
All songs by Brian Vander Ark unless noted.

1. "Supergig" 3:59
2. "She Loves Everybody" (Brian Vander Ark, Donny Brown) 3:05
3. "Hero" 3:34
4. "Television" 2:54
5. "In Between" 3:13
6. "Kiss Me Idle" 4:46
7. "Headlines" 3:44
8. "The F Word" 3:28
9. "Generations" (A. J. Dunning, Brian Vander Ark) 3:38
10. "Half a Mind" 4:27
11. "She Has Faces" (Donny Brown) 4:46
12. "La La" (Brian Vander Ark, Donny Brown) 4:10
