= Manzarek–Krieger =

American rock band

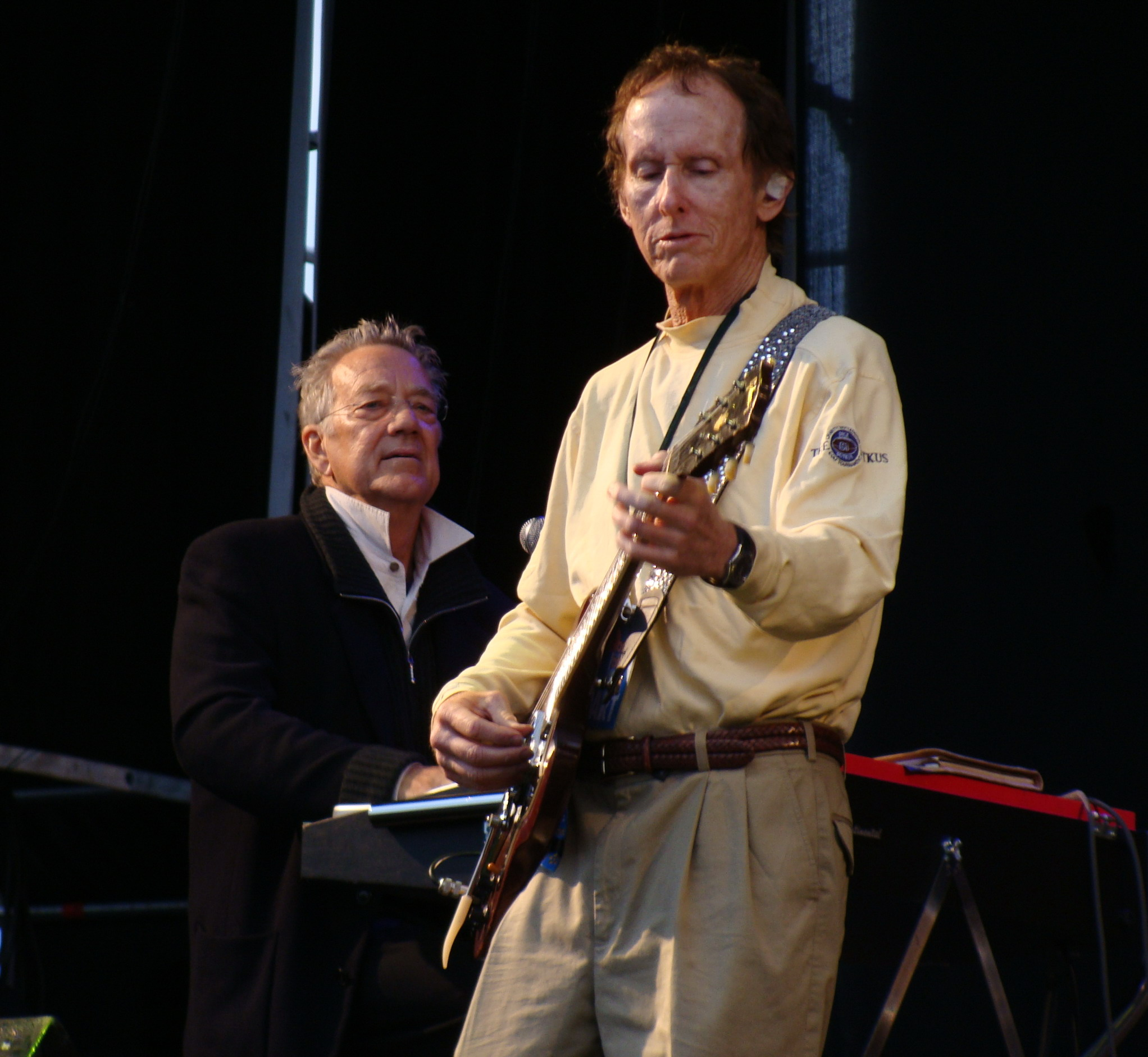
- Riders on the Storm performing at Bilbao BBK Live, July 6, 2008

Background information
- Also known as: The Doors of the 21st Century, D21C, Riders on the Storm, Ray Manzarek & Robby Krieger of The Doors, Manzarek & Krieger
- Origin: Los Angeles, California, U.S.
- Genres: Rock and roll; rock
- Years active: 2002–2013
- Past members: Ray Manzarek; Robby Krieger; Ian Astbury; Angelo Barbera; Stewart Copeland; Ty Dennis; Phil Chen; Brett Scallions; Dave Brock; Miljenko Matijevic

Manzarek–Krieger was an American rock band formed by two former members of the Doors, Ray Manzarek and Robby Krieger, in 2002. They were also known as "The Doors of the 21st Century", "D21C", and "Riders on the Storm" after the Doors song of the same name. They settled on using "Manzarek–Krieger" or "Ray Manzarek and Robby Krieger of The Doors" for legal reasons, after acrimonious debates and court battles between the two musicians and Doors co-founder/drummer John Densmore. They performed Doors material exclusively until the death of Manzarek in 2013.

== Formation ==
In 2002, Manzarek and Krieger reunited and produced a new version of "The Doors", called "The Doors of the 21st Century". The lineup was fronted by Ian Astbury of The Cult, with Angelo Barbera from Krieger's band on bass. At their first concert, the group announced that drummer John Densmore would not perform; it was later reported that he was unable to play because he suffered from tinnitus. Densmore was initially replaced by Stewart Copeland of the Police, but after Copeland broke his arm falling off a bicycle, the arrangement ended in mutual lawsuits, and he was replaced by Ty Dennis, who was the drummer with Krieger's band.

Densmore subsequently claimed that he had in fact not been invited to take part in the reunion. The newly configured group performed on several TV shows including The Tonight Show with Jay Leno and The Late Late Show with Craig Kilborn.

== Legal issues with The Doors name ==
In February 2003, Densmore filed a motion seeking an injunction against his former bandmates, hoping to prevent them from using the name The Doors of the 21st Century. His motion was initially denied in court and Ray Manzarek publicly stated that the invitation for Densmore to return to the group still stood.

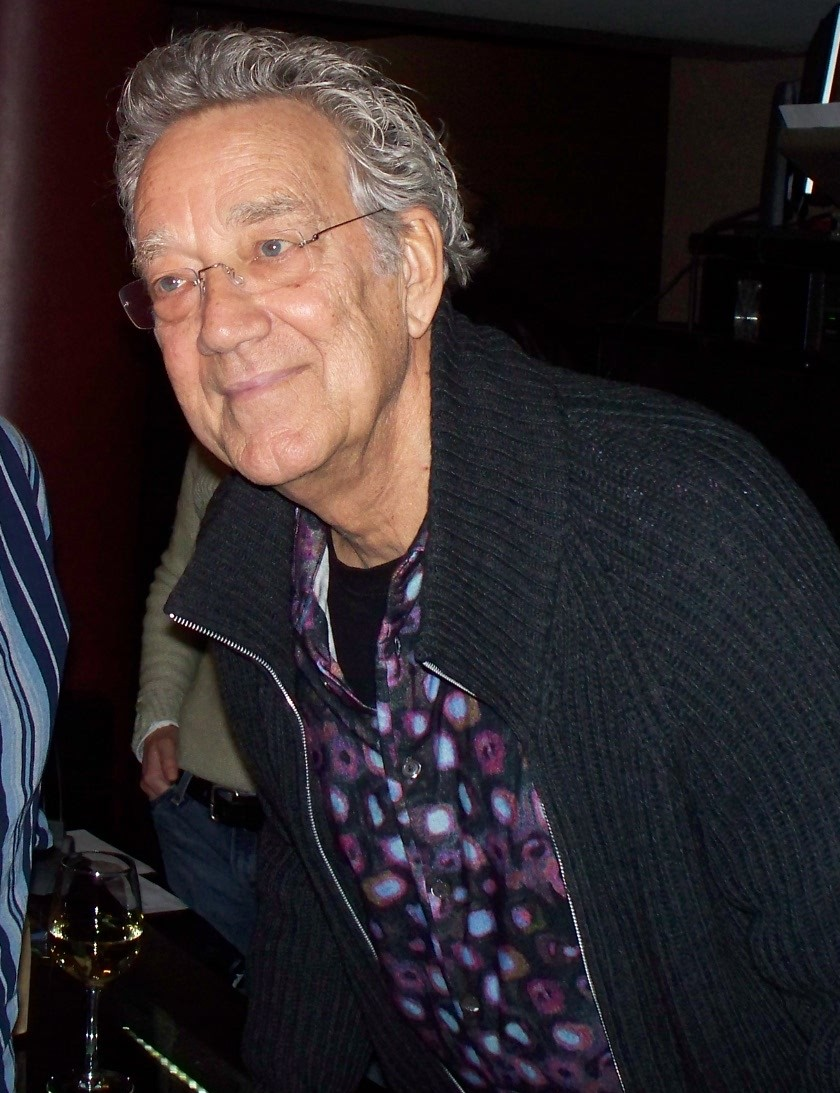
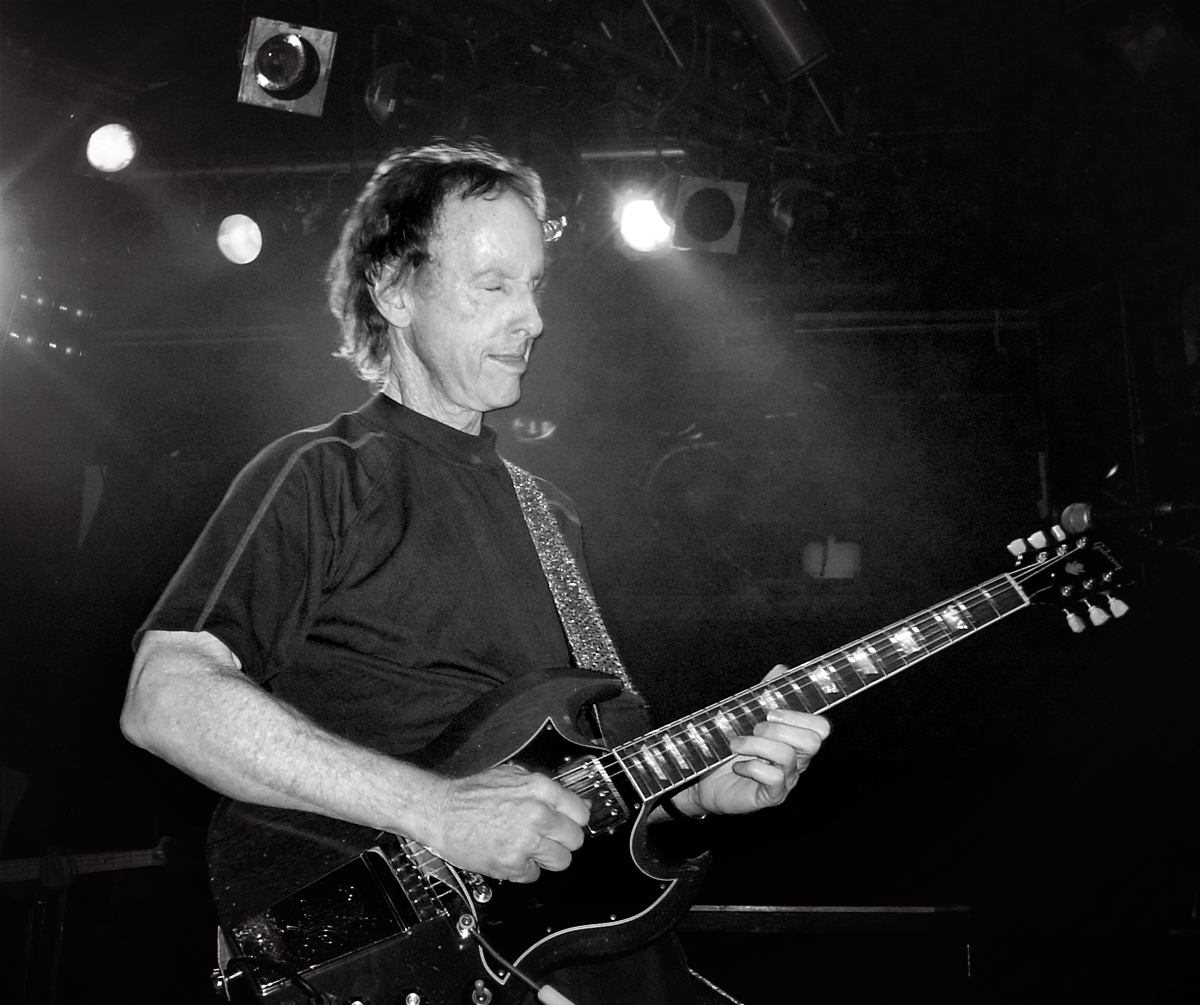
Ray Manzarek and Robby Krieger were the first members of the group.

It was reported that both Morrison's family and that of Pamela Courson had joined Densmore in seeking to prevent Manzarek and Krieger from using The Doors' name. In July 2005 Densmore and the Morrison estate won a permanent injunction, causing the new band to switch to the name D21C. The group then played under the name Riders on the Storm after the title of a song by The Doors released in 1971 as the last track on the final Morrison-era album L.A. Woman. Manzarek and Krieger were allowed to promote their performances as "former Doors" and "members of The Doors".

In July 2007, Densmore said that he would not join the reconfigured band unless it was fronted by Eddie Vedder. Densmore said, "I play with Jim. If there's someone of that level, OK. I'm not gonna join them with Ian. That's not to diss Ian, he's a good singer – but he's no Jim Morrison. Eddie Vedder? My God, there's a singer." Vedder previously performed three Doors songs with Manzarek, Krieger, and Densmore at the 1993 Rock and Roll Hall of Fame induction ceremony.

Densmore has been steadfast in refusing to license The Doors' music for use in television commercials, including an offer of $15 million by Cadillac to lease the song "Break on Through (To the Other Side)", feeling that that would be in violation of the spirit in which the music was created. Densmore wrote about this subject for The Nation:

People lost their virginity to this music, got high for the first time to this music. I've had people say kids died in Vietnam listening to this music, other people say they know someone who didn't commit suicide because of this music ... On stage, when we played these songs, they felt mysterious and magic. That's not for rent.

Ray Manzarek was quoted as saying, "We're all getting older. We should, the three of us, be playing these songs because, hey, the end is always near. Morrison was a poet, and above all, a poet wants his words heard." When Morrison was asked what he would most like to be remembered for, he responded, "My words, man, my words."

Manzarek described the band's sound as Bauhaus music. "It's clean, it's pure. There is a keyboard on one side, a guitar on the other, drums in the middle, a bass line underneath that and the singer up front ... you can hear the words. That's one of the reasons why The Doors' sound is still important today. It's perfectly modern. That's what we wanted."

In August 2008, the California Supreme Court decided not to hear the case involving Krieger and Manzarek's use of the name The Doors in performances over the objections of Densmore and the Morrison estate, so the judgment against Krieger and Manzarek stands.

After 2009, Manzarek and Krieger toured using the names Manzarek-Krieger and Ray Manzarek and Robby Krieger of The Doors. In May 2013, Ray Manzarek died of bile duct cancer.

== Changing lineups ==
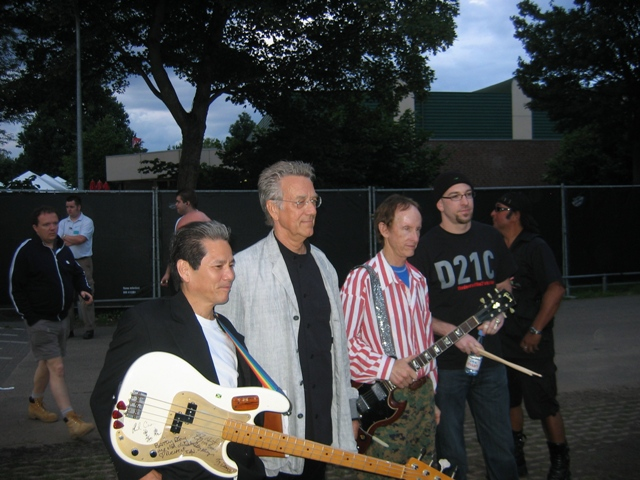
Phil Chen, Ray Manzarek, Robby Krieger and Ty Dennis — The Doors of the 21st Century

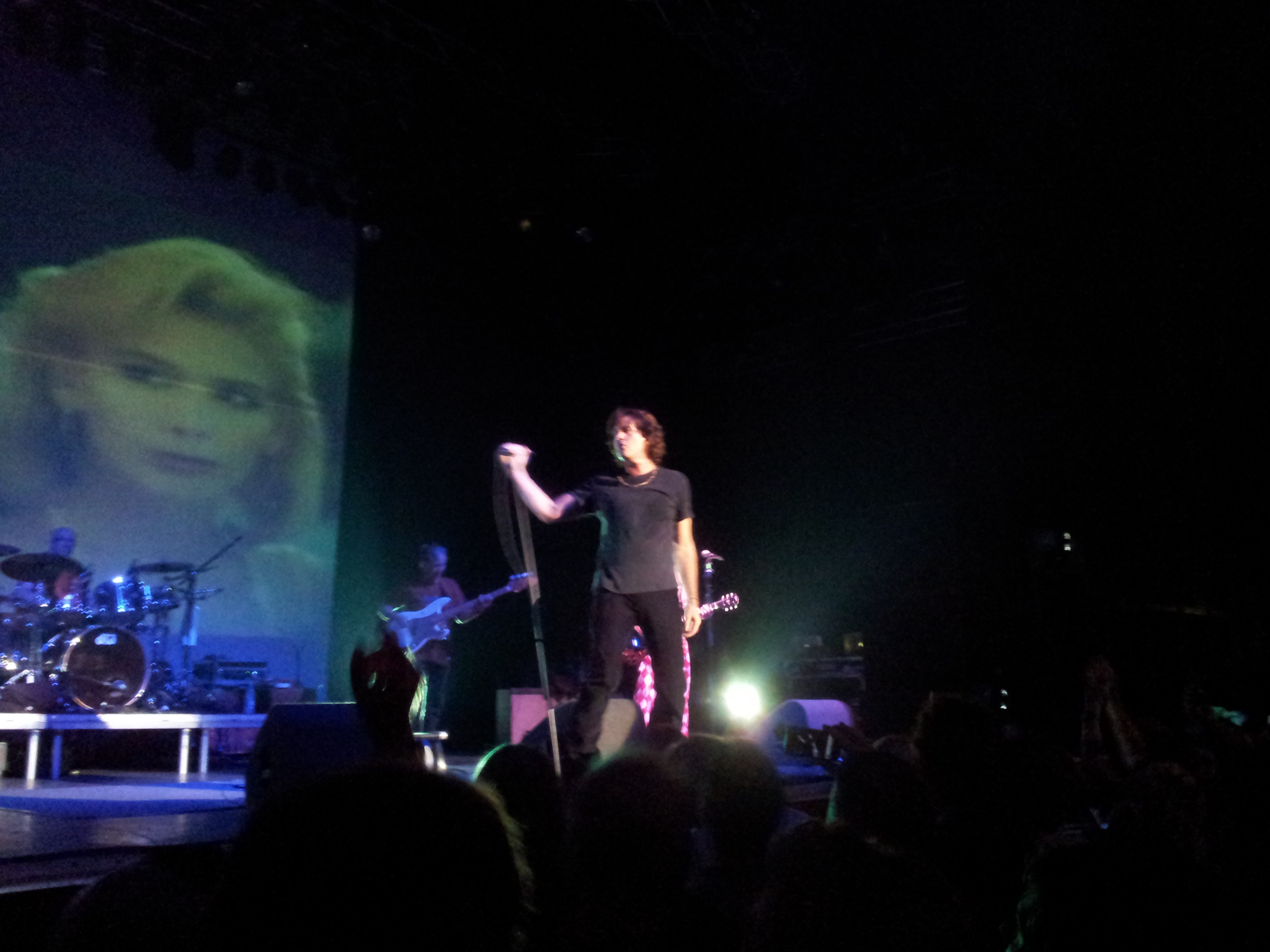
Dave Brock singing with Ray Manzarek & Robby Krieger of The Doors at the 013 in Tilburg, Netherlands on July 16, 2011

Bassist Angelo Barbera left the band in 2004 and was replaced by Phil Chen who had worked with Krieger previously in the Butts Band.

On February 16, 2007, Ian Astbury quit Riders on the Storm and relaunched his old band, the Cult. On March 14, 2007, Brett Scallions, former lead singer of the band Fuel, was announced as the new lead singer of Riders on the Storm.

In May 2010, Miljenko Matijevic of Steelheart was announced as their new singer for the US tour. One notable appearance was a free outdoor concert in Manzarek's hometown of Napa, California, in September 2010 as the culmination of the local Napa River Festival. The Napa Valley Symphony accompanied the band for the final songs "Light My Fire" and "Riders on the Storm".

In late 2010, Dave Brock was introduced as the new singer, replacing Matijevic. Dave Brock already knew the Doors catalogue from playing the lead role in The Jim Morrison Rock Opera, then forming his own The Doors tribute band called Wild Child.

About having Dave Brock as their singer, Krieger stated in an interview with Billboard: "We've always been kind of afraid to ask him (Dave Brock) to play with us, because people say, 'Oh, you're using a tribute singer. Now you're your own tribute band.' But then Journey got that karaoke singer (Arnel Pineda) and everybody loved it, so we said, 'If they can do that, we can use David. And he's been great. That's not to say the other guys (the Cult's Ian Astbury, Fuel's Brett Scallions) didn't do a good job, but I think when people come to see Ray and I, they want to see us do the Doors music as it should be done, so why not use a guy who really is an expert? He knows the songs better than we do, really."

== Touring ==
The band performed in Mexico, Bolivia, France, Israel, Russia, Italy, Czech Republic, the Netherlands, and Austria in 2011. In most of the countries, they just played one concert, but in Mexico, they played six, in different cities. Forrest Penner subbed on guitar for all Mexico dates (Mexico City and Guadalajara) and La Paz, Bolivia when Robby fell ill. Ray's brother Rick Manczarek of Rick & the Ravens made several guest appearances on guitar throughout the tour.

== Recordings ==
Krieger said in a Billboard interview that he and Manzarek "talked about" recording some new music and even have songs they began when Astbury was working with them. "We do have some songs that we've worked up. We're just waiting for the right time, but we'll definitely be doing that." He and Manzarek were also looking ahead towards a full-scale world tour to celebrate the Doors' 50th anniversary in 2016, however, Manzarek's death in 2013 ended these plans.

The band did not release any official albums but occasionally offered CDs of their live shows for purchase after the shows through the DiscLive service. They released a live concert DVD in 2003 titled LA Woman Live as The Doors of the 21st Century. The DVD captured one night of their tour of The Doors' L.A. Woman studio album which The original Doors never undertook due to the death of their original lead singer Jim Morrison. Additionally, Ian Astbury recorded the Doors song "Touch Me" in the studio with all three of the surviving Doors members for the Stoned Immaculate: The Music of the Doors tribute CD in 2000. This track remains the closest thing to an official studio track from the reformed group to date. The Doors song "Wild Child" was also recorded by Astbury for the album with his band the Cult, along with Ray Manzarek. There have not been any other studio tracks recorded with any of the other lead singers since Astbury's departure.

The group played several new songs during their live shows that were intended for their unrecorded album, including "Cops Talk", "Forever", "Eagle in a Whirlwind", and "American Express". The songs for the album were written by Astbury, Michael McClure, Jim Carroll, John Doe, Henry Rollins and others, and was intended to be recorded in 2003–2004.

=== Live performances ===
Officially released live recordings as The Doors of the 21st Century through DiscLive:

- Live in Hollywood, CA: New Year's Eve 2004 (12/31/03)
- Live in Atlanta, GA (5/1/04)
- Live in West Palm Beach, FL (5/2/04)
- Live in New York City, NY: "Live from the Five" (5/5/04)
- Live in Uncasville, CT (5/6/04)
- Live in Denver, CO (6/18/04)
- Live in Anaheim, CA: New Year's Eve 2005 (12/31/04)
- The Doors of the 21st Century

Tommy Hilfiger at Jones Beach Theater, Wantagh, NY August 24, 2003

== Personnel ==
=== Members ===
Former members

- Ray Manzarek – keyboards, vocals (2002–2013; died 2013)
- Robby Krieger – guitar, vocals (2002–2013)
- Ian Astbury – lead vocals (2002–2007)
- Angelo Barbera – bass guitar (2002–2004)
- Stewart Copeland – drums, percussion (2002–2003)
- Ty Dennis – drums, percussion (2003–2013)
- Phil Chen – bass guitar (2004–2013; died 2021)
- Brett Scallions – lead vocals (2007–2010)
- Miljenko Matijevic – lead vocals (2010)
- Dave Brock – lead vocals (2010–2013)

Guest musicians

- Rick Manzarek – guitar, whistle and percussion (2011)
- Owen Goldman – percussion (2011)
- Forrest Penner – guitar (2011; Mexico/South America tour March 2011. Taking Krieger's place due to health problems)
- Alex Lora – vocals (2011; only on Light My Fire on the Mexico City tour March 3, 2011)

==== Timeline ====
Lineups

2002–2003 The Doors of the 21st Century	Ray Manzarek – keyboards, vocals; Robby Krieger – guitar, vocals; Ian Astbury – lead vocals; Angelo Barbera – bass guitar; Stewart Copeland – drums, percussion
2003–2004 D21C/Riders on the Storm	Ray Manzarek – keyboards, vocals; Robby Krieger – guitar, vocals; Ian Astbury – lead vocals; Angelo Barbera – bass guitar; Ty Dennis – drums, percussion
2004–2007 Riders on the Storm	Ray Manzarek – keyboards, vocals; Robby Krieger – guitar, vocals; Ian Astbury – lead vocals; Ty Dennis – drums, percussion; Phil Chen – bass guitar
2007–2010 Riders on the Storm/Manzarek–Krieger	Ray Manzarek – keyboards vocals; Robby Krieger – guitar, vocals; Ty Dennis – drums, percussion; Phil Chen – bass guitar; Brett Scallions – lead vocals
2010 Manzarek–Krieger	Ray Manzarek – keyboards, vocals; Robby Krieger – guitar, vocals; Ty Dennis – drums, percussion; Phil Chen – bass guitar; Miljenko Matijevic – lead vocals
2010–2013 Manzarek–Krieger	Ray Manzarek – keyboards, vocals; Robby Krieger – guitar, vocals; Ty Dennis – drums, percussion; Phil Chen – bass guitar; Dave Brock – lead vocals; Guest Musicians: Rick Manzarek – guitar, whistle and percussion (2011); Owen Goldman – percussion (2011); Forrest Penner – guitar (2011; only on Mexico City & Guadalajara tour on March 9–10, 2011. Taking Krieger's place due to health problems); Alex Lora – vocals (2011; only on Light My Fire on the Mexico City tour March 3, 2011)
