= Chris Risola =

American musician and songwriter (born 1958)

- Born: 30 June 1958 (age 68); Stamford, Connecticut, United States
- Genres: Glam metal, hard rock, rock and roll, blues rock
- Occupations: Musician, songwriter
- Instrument: Guitar
- Years active: 1985–present
- Formerly of: Steelheart
- Website: http://chrisrisola.com/ http://www.steelheart.com/

Chris Risola (born June 30, 1958) is an American musician and songwriter. He is best known as the original lead guitarist for the glam metal band Steelheart.

== Career ==
Risola first started playing guitar at age 13. In high school, he studied music theory and formed numerous bands.

In 1981, Risola was playing lead guitar with his band consisting of Jimmy Ward on bass and Jack Wilkinson on drums, they then started auditioning singers, eventually hiring 15-year-old Mike Matijevic. The result was the band Rampage which was soon changed to Red Alert.

=== Steelheart ===
In 1989, the band consisting of members Chris Risola, Ward and Matijevic added former Rage of Angels members John Fowler on drums and Frank DiCostanzo on rhythm guitar. They were signed to MCA Records in 1990 and the name of the band was then changed to Steelheart. Risola played on the first two Steelheart albums, Steelheart and Tangled in Reins. His solos focused on hard blues, rock, speed, tapping and harmonies with rhythm guitarist Frank DiCostanzo.

Steelheart released their self-titled debut album in 1990. It sold 33,000 copies on its first day in Japan alone, and quickly hit platinum status. The album peaked at #40 on Billboard's Top 200 albums listing. Two singles from the album, "She's Gone" and "I'll Never Let You Go" both reached the Billboard Hot 100 in 1991.

Steelheart’s next effort, Tangled in Reins was a much more mixed combination than the debut, with songs like “Sticky Side Up” to ballads such as “Mama Don’t You Cry”, which charted at #1 in several East Asian countries including Hong Kong, prompting their Asian tour in September 1992. Nearing the end of the 'Tangled in Reins' tour, Slaughter asked Steelheart to perform one last show in Denver, Colorado. While performing “Dancing in the Fire” from the album Tangled in Reins, Matijevic decided to climb a lighting truss, which was improperly secured. Matijevic tried to evade the fall of the massive rig, but without success. An injured Mike walked off stage that night but would never again front the band in its original form.

After a 13-year hiatus, Risola rejoined Steelheart, joined by Mike Humbert on drums, along with Rev Jones on bass. In 2006, the band did the 'Just a Taste' tour. In 2007 and 2008, Steelheart played the Rocklahoma festivals, and in 2009 did the 'Good 2B Alive' tour.

Risola has taught guitar and music theory to well known acts such as musician Moby,, guitarist Paul Nelson of the Johnny Winter Band And Begley Bopper.
