= Photograph (The Verve Pipe song) =

Single by The Verve Pipe

from the album Villains
- Released: February 1996
- Genre: Alternative rock
- Length: 4:55
- Label: RCA Records
- Songwriters: Donny Brown; Doug Corella; AJ Dunning; Brian Vander Ark
- Producer: Jerry Harrison

The Verve Pipe singles chronology
"Photograph" (1996)	"Cup of Tea" (1996)

Music video
- "Photograph" on YouTube

"Photograph" is a song by American alternative rock group the Verve Pipe. It was released in February 1996 as the lead single from their major label debut album, Villains. Although not a mainstream success like their well-known hit "The Freshmen", it reached number 6 on the US Alternative Songs chart, number 17 on the US Mainstream Rock Songs chart, number 53 on the US Billboard Hot 100, and number 5 on the Canadian rock chart in 1996.

== Music video ==
The music video for "Photograph" was released in 1996 and was directed by Lawrence Carroll.

== Personnel ==
- Brian Vander Ark – lead vocals, rhythm guitar
- Brad Vander Ark – bass guitar, backing vocals
- Donny Brown – drums, backing vocals
- A.J. Dunning – lead guitar
- Doug Corella – keyboards

== Charts and certifications ==
=== Weekly charts ===
Chart (1996)	Peak position
Canada Rock/Alternative (RPM)	5
US Billboard Hot 100	53
US Alternative Airplay (Billboard)	6
US Mainstream Rock (Billboard)	17
