= We All Die Young =

Song by Steelheart

from the album Wait
- Released: October 25, 1996
- Recorded: 1996
- Genre: Hard rock
- Length: 5:06
- Label: Dream Train/Z Records
- Songwriter(s): Miljenko Matijevic, Kenny Kanowski
- Producer(s): Miljenko Matijevic, Kit Woolven

"We All Die Young" is a power ballad by Miljenko Matijevic of Steelheart, and Kenny Kanowski formerly of Steelheart. It is the first song from the 1996 album Wait.

== Covers ==
The song was covered by the fictional band Steel Dragon in the 2001 film Rock Star, starring Mark Wahlberg as Chris Cole. The band also featured Miljenko Matijevic on vocals, Zakk Wylde on guitar, Jeff Pilson on bass and Jason Bonham on drums. For the movie, Matijevic performed the vocals for Mark Wahlberg's character.

In 2007, the song was covered by melodic metal band Eden's Curse for their self-titled debut album.
