= Covering the Bases =

Studio album by Bronson Arroyo
- Released: July 12, 2005
- Genres: Grunge, alternative rock
- Length: 53:09
- Label: Asylum Records
- Producer: Loren Harriet

Professional ratings
Review scores
Source	Rating
Allmusic	2.5/5 stars

Covering the Bases is the debut album by Major League Baseball pitcher Bronson Arroyo. It was released in 2005 following the Boston Red Sox 2004 World Series Championship, which Arroyo was a part of.

The album features cover versions of twelve songs — mainly modern rock hits — that Arroyo would play for his teammates while in the locker room and on the road. Musicians involved in the album included prolific studio guitarist Michael Landau, Alice in Chains/Ozzy Osbourne bassist Mike Inez, Red Sox general manager Theo Epstein, and a small spoken word part during "Everlong" by author Stephen King.

== Track listing ==
1. "Slide" by Goo Goo Dolls – 3:32
2. "Down in a Hole" by Alice in Chains* – 5:53
3. "The Freshmen" by The Verve Pipe – 4:27
4. "Everlong" by Foo Fighters (featuring Stephen King) – 4:07
5. "Black" by Pearl Jam – 5:26
6. "Pardon Me" by Incubus – 3:38
7. "Something's Always Wrong" by Toad the Wet Sprocket – 5:27
8. "Plush" by Stone Temple Pilots – 5:00
9. "Shimmer" by Fuel – 3:14
10. "Hunger Strike" by Temple of the Dog – 3:59
11. "Best I Ever Had (Grey Sky Morning)" by Vertical Horizon – 4:30
12. "Dirty Water" by The Standells (featuring Johnny Damon, Kevin Millar, and Kevin Youkilis) – 3:56

*Note: "Down in a Hole" by Alice in Chains is listed as "Down in the Hole".

== Personnel ==
=== Musicians ===
- Bronson Arroyo - vocals, vocals (background), percussion, spoken word
- Kenny Aronoff - drums
- Leland Sklar - bass
- Mike Inez - bass
- Michael Landau - electric guitar
- Tim Pierce - acoustic rhythm guitar, mandolin
- John "JT" Thomas - Hammond B3, strings, Wurlitzer
- Amy Keys - vocals
- Kevin Youkilis - vocals (background)
- Terry Wood - vocals (background)
- Carmen Twillie - vocals (background)
- Clydene Jackson - vocals (background)
- David Isaacs - vocals (background)
- Lenny Dinardo - vocals (background)
- Johnny Damon - vocals (background)
- Stephen King - spoken word

=== Production ===
- Lorren Harriet - producer
- Tally Sherwood - engineer, mixing
- Danny Bernini - engineer
- Stephen Marcussen - mastering
- Bronson Arroyo - executive producer
- Terry Bross - executive producer
- E.K. Gaylord - executive producer
- Richard Thomas Jennings - layout design
- Louie Mann - marketing, project coordinator
- Kevin Mazur - photography
