= Ty Dennis =

American drummer

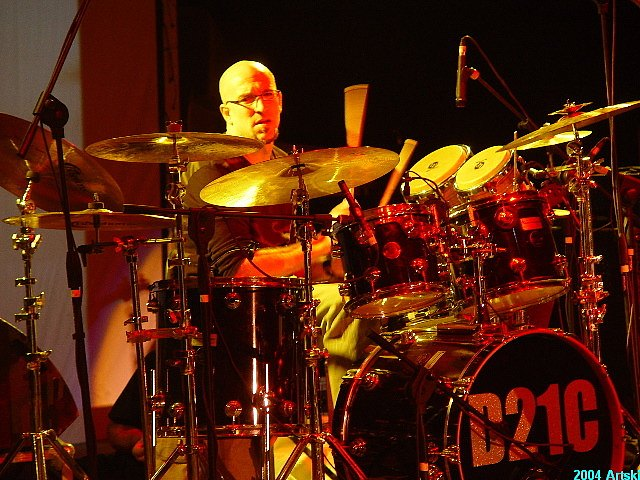
- Ty Dennis - Drummer

Background information
- Also known as: Ty Miles Dennis
- Born: January 19, 1971 (age 54); Orange County, California, United States
- Origin: Garden Grove, California, United States
- Genres: Rock and Roll, Jazz, Fusion
- Occupation: Drummer
- Instrument: Drums
- Years active: 1990s–present

Ty Dennis (born January 19, 1971) is an American drummer best known for his work with The Doors revival bands The Doors of the 21st Century, Manzarek-Krieger, and the Robby Krieger Band.

== Early life ==
Ty was born in 1971 and grew up in Garden Grove, California, near Disneyland. He graduated from Garden Grove High School, the Argonauts, in 1989. His father is an accomplished jazz drummer. He spent his childhood there before moving to Los Angeles as a teenager.

== Career ==
By 1995, Ty became established as a session musician in Los Angeles, playing many styles of music including rock, jazz and fusion. His favorite musician and biggest influence is Herbie Hancock.

He spent some time drumming for The Motels featuring Martha Davis when he met bassist Angelo Barbera who was playing bass for the Robby Krieger Band. When the Robby Krieger Band needed a new drummer in 2001 Barbera recommended Ty for the job and he got it. When Stewart Copeland broke his arm after falling off a bicycle in 2003, Dennis filled in for him in The Doors of the 21st Century, the newly reformed version of The Doors which was led by Robby Krieger and organist Ray Manzarek. After playing for them for several months, it became clear that Copeland would not return and Dennis was the new permanent drummer for the band. He has remained with them ever since, throughout all of their name changes.

== Equipment ==
Dennis uses DW drums, Ludwig snare drums, Aquarian drumheads, Bosphorus cymbals, Innovative Percussion drumsticks and SKB cases.

Drums: DW VLT series in champagne sparkle or broken glass finish (drums going from left to right):

- 22" bass drum
- 12" rack tom
- 10" rack tom
- 14" floor tom
- 16" floor tom
- 14" VLT maple snare
- 13" Edge series snare
- various Ludwig metal snares

Cymbals: Bosphorus:

- 14" Gold hi-hats
- 18" Versa crash w/ rivets/10" Traditional splash (stacked)
- 18" Traditional crash/ride
- 21" Traditional medium ride
- 19" Traditional ride (used as crash)
- 13" Turk hi-hats (aux hi-hats)
- 18" Gold china/8" Gold splash (stacked)
- 20" Traditional china

Drumsticks:Innovative Percussion:

- IP 5B Vintage wood tip
