= I've Suffered a Head Injury =

1992 album and EP by the Verve Pipe

EP by The Verve Pipe
- Released: 1992; 1995 (rerelease)
- Recorded: 1992; Station C Studios, Grand Rapids
- Genre: Alternative rock
- Length: 26:46
- Label: LMNO Pop/BMG
- Producer: Jon Frazer, the Verve Pipe

The Verve Pipe chronology
I've Suffered a Head Injury (1992)	Pop Smear (1993)

Professional ratings
Review scores
Source	Rating
AllMusic	link

I've Suffered a Head Injury is an independent album and an EP by the Verve Pipe. It was originally released in 1992 as the band's debut album. This rare 10-track album version contains two songs written by original lead guitarist Brian Stout and an acoustic recording of "The Freshmen", which the band re-recorded for its hit 1996 album Villains. Later in 1992, the band released the album in EP form on LMNO Pop. The 1995 rerelease of the EP has the same track listing as the original EP.

== 1992 EP/1995 re-release ==
All songs produced by Jon Frazer and the Verve Pipe.

No.	Title	Writer(s)	Length
1.	"Ark of the Envious"	Brian Vander Ark	3:35
2.	"Even the Score"	Brian Vander Ark, Brad Vander Ark	4:18
3.	"Acting as Your Slave"	Brian Vander Ark	3:28
4.	"Oceanside"	Donny Brown	4:06
5.	"I've Suffered a Head Injury"	Brian Vander Ark, Brad Vander Ark	3:57
6.	"Clean Break"	Brian Vander Ark	3:19
7.	"Martyr Material"	Brian Vander Ark	4:03

== Original 1992 10-track album ==
I've Suffered a Head Injury

Studio album by The Verve Pipe
- Released: November 19, 1992
- Recorded: 1992; Station C Studios, Grand Rapids; Brown and Brown, Portage ("The Freshmen")
- Genre: Alternative rock
- Producer: Jon Frazer and The Verve Pipe; Kevin and Debbie Brown ("The Freshmen")

The Verve Pipe chronology
I've Suffered a Head Injury (1992)	Pop Smear (1993)

Professional ratings
Review scores
Source	Rating
AllMusic	link

All songs produced by Jon Frazer and the Verve Pipe except "The Freshmen", produced and engineered by Kevin and Debby Brown.

No.	Title	Writer(s)	Length
1.	"Ark of the Envious"	Brian Vander Ark	3:35
2.	"Even the Score"	Brian Vander Ark, Brad Vander Ark	4:18
3.	"Brian's Song"	Brian Stout	4:06
4.	"Acting as Your Slave"	Brian Vander Ark	3:28
5.	"Oceanside"	Donny Brown	4:06
6.	"I've Suffered a Head Injury"	Brian Vander Ark, Brad Vander Ark	3:57
7.	"Clean Break"	Brian Vander Ark	3:19
8.	"Monterey"	Brian Stout	4:06
9.	"Martyr Material"	Brian Vander Ark	4:03
10.	"The Freshmen"	Brian Vander Ark	4:10

== Band members ==
- Brian Vander Ark - guitar, vocals
- Brian Stout - lead guitar, vocals
- Brad Vander Ark - bass, vocals
- Donny Brown - percussion, vocals
