= A Family Album =

Studio album by The Verve Pipe
- Released: October 6, 2009
- Recorded: Big Sky Recording, Ann Arbor, MI, Hess Street Studios, Lansing, MI
- Length: 28:59
- Producer: Donny Brown

The Verve Pipe chronology
A Homemade Holiday (2007)	A Family Album (2009)	Are We There Yet? (2013)

Professional ratings
Review scores
Source	Rating
Allmusic	link

A Family Album is a children's album by The Verve Pipe. It is the first children's album by the band and was released in 2009 on Big Sky Recording.

== Track listing ==
All songs produced by Donny Brown.

All tracks are written by Brian Vander Ark and Donny Brown, except as noted.

No.	Title	Writer(s)	Length
1.	"Wake Up"		2:17
2.	"We Had to Go Home"		3:03
3.	"Complimentary Love"		2:51
4.	"Be Part of the Band"		3:17
5.	"When One Became Two"		2:09
6.	"Cereal"		3:30
7.	"Only One of You"	Brian Vander Ark, Donny Brown, Edward Groves	3:01
8.	"Suppertime!"		2:21
9.	"Worrisome One"		2:23
10.	"Go to Sleep Now"		4:07

== Personnel ==
The Verve Pipe

Band members Brian Vander Ark, Donny Brown and John Connors play throughout. A host of additional musicians contributed to the album.

- Brian Vander Ark – lead vocals, acoustic guitar on tracks 3–6, 8 and 9; classical guitar on "Go to Sleep Now"
- Donny Brown – drums, background vocals, percussion, synthesizer; keyboards on "When One Became Two" and "Only One of You"
- John Connors – bass
- Lou Musa – electric guitar on "Wake Up", "Cereal", "Only One of You" and "Suppertime!"; background vocals on "Wake Up"
- Craig Griffith – harmonica on "Be Part of the Band" and "Suppertime!"; background vocals on "Suppertime!"

Additional musicians

- Keith Axtell – rhythm guitar and licks on "Only One of You"
- Mark Byerly – trumpet and background vocals on "We Had to Go Home"
- Gary Clavette – clarinet on "We Had to Go Home"; saxophone on "Cereal"
- Ben Keeler – opening electric guitar on "Be Part of the Band"
- Nathanael Koenig – cowbell on "Wake Up"
- Stephanie, Gabrielle & Brooke Krieger, Susan & Elizabeth Rohn – cheerleaders on "Wake Up" and "Be Part of the Band"
- Mark Miller – acoustic guitar on "Wake Up"; electric guitar on "Complimentary Love" and "Worrisome One"
- Motor City Horns (Mark Byerly, trumpet; John Rutherford, trombone; Keith Kaminski, alto and tenor sax) – horns on "Complimentary Love"
- Paul Mundo – trombone on "We Had to Go Home" and "Only One of You"
- Steve Pinckney – electric guitar on "Go to Sleep Now"
- Andy Reed – acoustic and electric guitar on "Be Part of the Band"; ethereal keys and samples on "Go to Sleep Now"
- Kay Rinker-O'Neil – flute on "When One Became Two"; opera voice on "Cereal"
- Emily Rust – "Come and Get It!!" on "Suppertime!"
- Randy Sly – keyboards on "Complimentary Love" and "Be Part of the Band"; organ on "When One Became Two", "Cereal" and "Worrisome One"; piano and electric piano on "Only One of You"
- Tracy Sonneborn – french horn on "Go to Sleep Now"
- Scott VanDell – electric guitar on "We Had to Go Home" and "Be Part of the Band"
- Cathy Waldron – bassoon on "When One Became Two"

Additional production

- Engineered by Geoff Michael, Chris DuRoss and Donny Brown
- Additional engineering:
  - Mark Miller at Harvest Music and Sound
  - Andy Reed at Reed Recording Co.
  - Mark Byerly at Longview Sound
  - Al McAvoy
- Additional editing by Ryan Wert and Jon Frazer
- Mixed by John Holbrook at The Den, Kinderhook, NY
- Mastered by Glenn Brown at GBP Studios, East Lansing, MI
- Julie Magsig – horn arrangement for "We Had to Go Home" and "Complimentary Love"
- Management: Doug Buttleman at Artist In Mind
- Administration: Mara Wish Buttleman
- Booking: Adam Bauer at Fleming Artists
- Art direction and design: Kate Cosgrove
