= Hero (The Verve Pipe song) =

Single by the Verve Pipe

from the album The Verve Pipe
- Released: 1999
- Genre: Alternative rock
- Length: 3:34
- Label: RCA Records
- Songwriter: Brian Vander Ark
- Producer: Michael Beinhorn

The Verve Pipe singles chronology
"Villains" (1997)	"Hero" (1999)	"Never Let You Down" (2001)

Music video
- "Hero" on YouTube

"Hero" is a song by American alternative rock band the Verve Pipe, released in 1999 as the lead single from their fourth studio album, The Verve Pipe. The song reached number 17 on the US Alternative Songs chart and number 38 on the US Mainstream Rock Songs chart.

"Hero" was nominated for the Outstanding National Single award by the Detroit Music Awards Foundation in 2000.

== Music video ==
The music video for "Hero" was released in 1999 and was directed by Gregory Dark.

== Personnel ==
- Brian Vander Ark – lead vocals, rhythm guitar
- Brad Vander Ark – bass guitar, backing vocals
- Donny Brown – drums, backing vocals
- A.J. Dunning – lead guitar
- Doug Corella – keyboards

== Charts and certifications ==
=== Weekly charts ===
Chart (1999)	Peak position
US Alternative Airplay (Billboard)	17
US Mainstream Rock (Billboard)	38
