= I'll Never Let You Go =

Single by Steelheart

from the album Steelheart
- Released: 1990
- Recorded: 1990
- Genre: Glam metal
- Length: 5:06
- Label: MCA
- Songwriter: Miljenko Matijevic
- Producer: Mark Opitz

Steelheart singles chronology
"Can't Stop Me Lovin' You" (1990)	"I'll Never Let You Go" (1990)	"She's Gone" (1991)

"I'll Never Let You Go" (also titled "I'll Never Let You Go (Angel Eyes)") is a power ballad by American glam metal band Steelheart. It was released as the second single from their 1990 self-titled debut album. It peaked at No. 23 on the Billboard Hot 100 and No. 24 on the Mainstream Rock chart. It is the band's highest-charting single to date.
