= A Homemade Holiday =

EP by The Verve Pipe
- Released: December 18, 2007
- Genre: Rock
- Length: 12:34

The Verve Pipe chronology
Platinum & Gold Collection (2004)	A Homemade Holiday (2007)	A Family Album (2009)

A Homemade Holiday is a Christmas EP by The Verve Pipe, released in 2007.

== Track listing ==
No.	Title	Writer(s)	Length
1.	"Silent Night"	Franz Gruber, Joseph Mohr/John Freeman Young	3:54
2.	"Joy to the World"	Lowell Mason, Isaac Watts	3:07
3.	"This Christmas Time"	Donny Brown	3:19
4.	"Rockin' Around the Christmas Tree"	Johnny Marks	2:14

== Personnel ==
- Brian Vander Ark – lead vocals, guitar
- Dan Matheny – guitars
- Doug Corella – keyboards, percussion
- Donny Brown – drums, backing vocals
- Joel Ferguson – bass
- Jake Bartlett – drums on "This Christmas Time"
