= Pop Smear =

Studio album by the Verve Pipe
- Released: 1993
- Genre: Alternative rock
- Length: 52:03
- Labels: LMNO Pop! RCA

The Verve Pipe chronology
I've Suffered a Head Injury (1992)	Pop Smear (1993)	Villains (1996)

Pop Smear is the second album by the Verve Pipe, released in 1993. The album sold around 50,000 copies, which resulted in interest from major labels. The band signed with RCA Records, and the album was rereleased in 1996.

== Production ==
The Verve Pipe funded the album's recording sessions out of its winnings from Yamaha Soundcheck's unsigned band competition.

== Critical reception ==
Professional ratings
Review scores
Source	Rating
AllMusic	4/5 stars
The Encyclopedia of Popular Music	3/5 stars
MusicHound Rock: The Essential Album Guide	3.5/5 stars

Trouser Press wrote that "the songs are sturdier and harder-hitting, the new muscle coming from plain old artistic growth plus the addition of guitarist A.J. Dunning."

== Track listing ==
All tracks are written by Brian Vander Ark, except where noted.

Tracks
No.	Title	Length
1.	"Pretty for You"	4:29
2.	"Spoonful of Sugar"	3:55
3.	"Victoria"	4:29
4.	"Honest" (Brian Vander Ark, Donny Brown)	3:18
5.	"The River" (Donny Brown)	6:19
6.	"Sleepy Town" (Donny Brown)	0:54
7.	"Bullies on Vacation"	4:25
8.	"What You Wanted"	5:22
9.	"Wanna Be" (Brian Vander Ark, Donny Brown)	3:59
10.	"Out Like a Lamb"	4:27
11.	"Senator Speak" (Brad Vander Ark, Brian Vander Ark)	4:23
12.	"Is It Worth It?" (Donny Brown)	6:03
Total length:		52:03

== Personnel ==
The Verve Pipe

- Brian Vander Ark – vocals, electric and acoustic guitars
- A.J. Dunning – vocals, electric, acoustic, slide and lead guitars, keyboards, mandolin
- Brad Vander Ark – vocals, bass, percussion
- Don Brown – vocals, drums, percussion

Additional personnel

- Kathryn Dykema – cello
- Doug Corella – percussion
- Mark Byerly – trumpet
- Albin Rose – viola
- Leslie E. Rose – violin
- Bob Engelsman – trombone
- Randy Sly – keyboards
- Tom "Mallets" Jansen – bells
