= Steelheart (album) =

Studio album by Steelheart
- Released: May 10, 1990
- Recorded: 1989
- Genre: Glam metal, hard rock, soft rock
- Length: 55:23
- Label: MCA
- Producer: Mark Opitz

Steelheart chronology
Steelheart (1990)	Tangled in Reins (1992)

Singles from Steelheart
- 1. "Can't Stop Me Lovin' You" Released: 1990; 2. "I'll Never Let You Go" Released: 1990; 3. "She's Gone" Released: 1991; 4. "Everybody Loves Eileen" Released: 1991

Professional ratings
Review scores
Source	Rating
AllMusic	2/5 stars

Steelheart is the first album by the American glam metal band Steelheart. It was released on July 10, 1990, and re-released with a new cover in 1991. It reached No. 40 on the Billboard 200. The album was certified Gold by the RIAA in 1991.

== Track listing ==
1. "Love Ain't Easy" – 3:41 (Miljenko Matijevic, James Ward)
2. "Can't Stop Me Lovin' You" – 5:06 (Matijevic)
3. "Like Never Before" – 4:45 (Matijevic, Ward)
4. "I'll Never Let You Go" – 5:06 (Matijevic)
5. "Everybody Loves Eileen" – 6:20 (Matijevic, Ward)
6. "Sheila" – 7:40 (Ward)
7. "Gimme Gimme" – 5:23 (Matijevic, Ward)
8. "Rock'n Roll (I Just Wanna)" – 4:10 (Matijevic, Ward)
9. "She's Gone" – 6:30 (Matijevic)
10. "Down n' Dirty" – 6:42 (Matijevic, Ward)

== Personnel ==
- Miljenko Matijevic – vocals
- Chris Risola – lead guitar
- Frank DiCostanzo – rhythm guitar
- James Ward – bass guitar
- John Fowler – drums

=== Additional personnel ===
- Engineered by Jeff Coppage, Lori Fumar, Clif Norrell and Paul Northfield
- Mixed by Paul Northfield
- Jai Winding - Piano on 'She's Gone'

== Charts ==
=== Weekly charts ===
Chart (1990–91)	Peak position
Swedish Albums (Sverigetopplistan)	40
US Billboard 200	40

=== Year-end charts ===
Chart (1991)	Position
US Billboard 200	72

== Certifications ==
Region	Certification	Certified units/sales
United States (RIAA)	Gold	500,000^{^}
^{^} Shipments figures based on certification alone.
