= Bronson Arroyo =

American baseball player (born 1977)

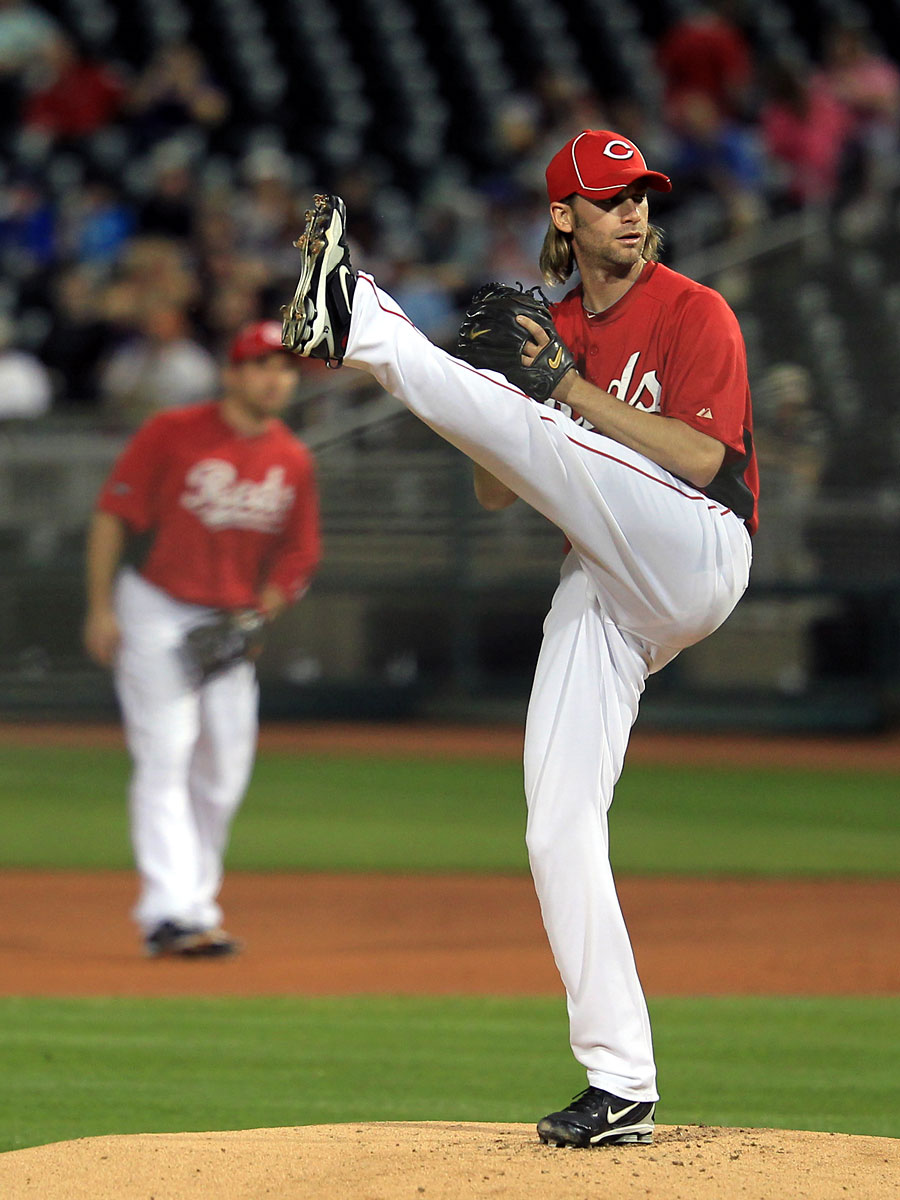
- Arroyo with the Cincinnati Reds in 2011
- Pitcher
- Born: February 24, 1977 (age 49); Key West, Florida, U.S.
- Batted: Right Threw: Right

MLB debut
- June 12, 2000, for the Pittsburgh Pirates

Last MLB appearance
- June 18, 2017, for the Cincinnati Reds

MLB statistics
- Win–loss record: 148–137
- Earned run average: 4.28
- Strikeouts: 1,571
- Stats at Baseball Reference

Teams
- Pittsburgh Pirates (2000–2002); Boston Red Sox (2003–2005); Cincinnati Reds (2006–2013); Arizona Diamondbacks (2014); Cincinnati Reds (2017)

Career highlights and awards
- All-Star (2006); World Series champion (2004); Gold Glove Award (2010); Cincinnati Reds Hall of Fame

Bronson Anthony Arroyo (born February 24, 1977) is an American former professional baseball pitcher and musician. He played in Major League Baseball (MLB) for the Pittsburgh Pirates between 2000 and 2002, the Boston Red Sox from 2003 to 2005, the Cincinnati Reds from 2006 to 2013, the Arizona Diamondbacks in 2014, and the Reds again in 2017. He won the 2004 World Series with Boston.

Arroyo's 1.2822 career home runs allowed per nine innings pitched is the most of any pitcher in MLB history. (Note: Minimum 2,000 innings pitched.)

== Early life ==
Arroyo was born February 24, 1977, in Key West, Florida, to parents Gus and Julie. Arroyo's father is originally from Cuba. Arroyo later moved from Key West, Florida, to Brooksville, Florida, where he attended Hernando High School. At Hernando, he was named to the Class 4A all-state first team in 1995. At 13 years old, Arroyo was PONY teammates with A. J. Pierzynski. As of 2004, Arroyo was third all-time in scoring for Hernando's basketball team. He signed a letter of intent to play college baseball as a pitcher at South Florida, turning down offers from Georgia Tech and Georgia Southern.

== Career ==
=== Pittsburgh Pirates ===
The Pittsburgh Pirates selected Arroyo in the third round of the 1995 Major League Baseball draft. Arroyo made his major league debut with Pittsburgh on June 12, 2000. During his rookie season in 2000, Arroyo was 2–6 with a 6.40 earned run average (ERA) in 20 appearances (12 starts). Playing 24 games (13 started) in 2001, Arroyo compiled a 5–7 record and a 5.09 ERA. Limited in playing time due to injuries and time in the minors, Arroyo played nine games (four started) in 2002 going 2–1 with a 4.00 ERA.

=== Boston Red Sox ===
Before the 2003 season, the Boston Red Sox claimed Arroyo from the Pirates off of waivers. Pitching in Triple-A for the Pawtucket Red Sox, Arroyo pitched the fourth nine-inning perfect game in the 121-year history of the International League on August 10, 2003. He struck out nine, and went to a three-ball count to just three hitters all game long. He made six appearances in the majors, posting a 2.08 ERA and recording his first career save.

==== 2004 ====
Arroyo improved in 2004, jumping from middle relief to be the Red Sox No. 5 starter. On July 24, 2004, Arroyo hit Alex Rodriguez with a pitch, which led to a bench-clearing brawl. He compiled a 10–9 mark with a 4.03 ERA in 178 2/3 innings, while posting a respectable 3.02 strikeout-to-walk ratio (142-to-47). He led the majors with hitting batsmen with pitches, totaling 20 hit by pitches. Arroyo also got his first and only championship title when the Red Sox won the World Series against the St. Louis Cardinals. Arroyo made two starts and four relief appearances in the postseason, compiling a 0–0 record with two holds and a 7.82 ERA for the 2004 World Series champion Red Sox. A memorable and controversial play occurred involving Arroyo during Game 6 of the 2004 American League Championship Series, when Alex Rodriguez knocked away the ball from Arroyo's glove while he attempted to apply a tag. The umpires reversed the ruling that Rodriguez was safe, forcing Derek Jeter to return to first base and calling Rodriguez out on the play for runner interference.

==== 2005 ====
Arroyo's most productive season came in 2005, when he posted career highs up to that time in wins (14), starts (32), innings (205.1) and pitching appearances (35). He also excelled at holding runners, as he only gave up five stolen bases. Before the 2006 season, Arroyo signed a three-year, $11.25 million contract with the Red Sox. Arroyo said the deal was a "hometown discount" and agreed to the terms against the advice of his agent.

=== Cincinnati Reds ===
==== 2006 ====
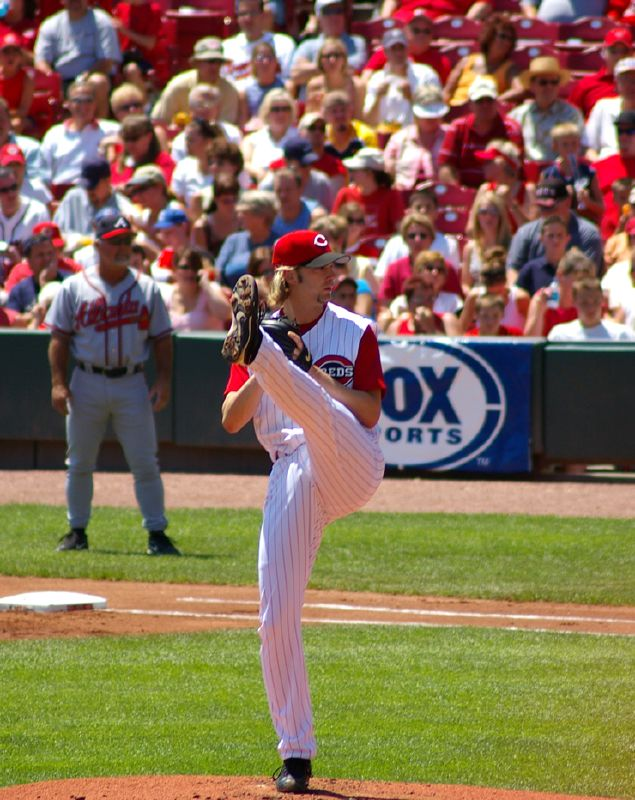
Arroyo in 2006.

During spring training before the 2006 season, the Red Sox traded Arroyo to the Cincinnati Reds for outfielder Wily Mo Peña. 2006 was a high point in Arroyo's career. Highlights of the season included a league-leading 240 2/3 innings pitched, a selection to the All-Star game, as well as his first career shutout in the major leagues. He finished 2006 with a 14–11 record and an ERA of 3.29.

==== 2007 ====
In February 2007, Arroyo signed a contract extension with the Cincinnati Reds which kept him with the organization through the 2010 season, with an option for the year 2011. He finished the 2007 season 9-15 and a 4.23 ERA.

==== 2008 ====
Arroyo pitched exactly 200 innings in 2008 by going 15–11 with a 4.77 ERA. During the season, Arroyo gave up 6 or more runs in a game 7 times in 34 starts including a game on June 24 against the Toronto Blue Jays where he gave up 11 earned runs in 1 inning of work (he pitched into the second inning without recording an out).

==== 2009 ====
Arroyo was diagnosed with carpal tunnel syndrome in his pitching hand during the 2008–09 offseason. As a result, he missed games during the 2009 spring training, as well as being advised to stop playing guitar until the symptoms disappeared. After a sub-par first half of the 2009 season, Arroyo turned in an excellent second half, lowering his ERA from the 5's to the 3's, throwing multiple shutouts and complete games, and putting himself in position to be the Reds top starter in 2010 since Edinson Vólquez, the #1 starter in 2009, was out for the start of the season following Tommy John surgery. Arroyo finished the 2009 year with 2 shutouts, a 15–13 record, and a 3.84 ERA.

==== 2010 ====
In 2010, Arroyo was chosen as the #2 starter in the Reds' first playoff series in 15 years. He pitched 5 1/3 innings against the Philadelphia Phillies, allowing one earned run and leaving with the lead. However, he would earn a no-decision as the Reds went on to lose the game. Arroyo won his first Gold Glove on November 10, 2010, the first by a Reds pitcher since Harvey Haddix in 1958. He finished the 2010 year 17-10 and a 3.88 ERA.

==== 2011 ====
The Reds exercised the 2011 option on Arroyo's contract on November 3, 2010. After exercising his option, the Reds and Arroyo agreed on a three-year, $35 million contract extension, keeping him with the team through 2013. On March 26, 2011, Arroyo was diagnosed with mononucleosis, a condition where there is a high lymphocytes count in the blood from an Epstein-Barr virus (EBV) infection. Arroyo finished the 2011 season 9-12 and a 5.07 ERA. He led the Majors with home runs allowed as he surrendered a total of 46 home runs.

==== 2012 ====
Arroyo finished the 2012 season by going 12–10 with a 3.74 ERA. Arroyo was chosen by Reds' manager Dusty Baker to start Game 2 of the 2012 National League Division Series versus the San Francisco Giants. He took a perfect game into the fifth inning, and allowed only two base-runners (a base hit with two outs in the fifth, and a walk in the seventh) in seven scoreless innings. The Reds won the game 9–0 to take a 2–0 series lead. The win was Arroyo's first in thirteen postseason appearances, including five starts.

==== 2013 ====
Arroyo finished the 2013 season with an ERA of 3.79 and a win–loss record of 14–12. He also was the league leader in home runs allowed, giving up 32 long balls. Although the numbers paint a picture of a subpar pitching year, Arroyo managed to throw one shutout and two complete games in his age 36 season. In the offseason Arroyo elected to test free agency.

=== Arizona Diamondbacks ===
==== 2014 ====
On February 7, 2014, the Diamondbacks agreed to terms with Arroyo on a 2-year contract with $23.5 million guaranteed.

On June 16, Arroyo was placed on the disabled list for the first time in his career, after leaving a start early against the Dodgers with an elbow injury. It was announced on July 7 that Arroyo would be undergoing Tommy John surgery to repair a torn UCL, forcing him out for the remainder of the 2014 season. In 14 starts of the 2014 year, he went 7–4 with a 4.08 ERA.

==== 2015 ====
Arroyo did not make an appearance during the 2015 season, continuing his recovery from Tommy John surgery.

=== Atlanta Braves / Los Angeles Dodgers ===
On June 20, 2015, Arroyo, along with Touki Toussaint, was traded to the Atlanta Braves for Phil Gosselin.

On July 30, 2015, in a three-team trade, the Los Angeles Dodgers acquired Arroyo, Mat Latos, Michael Morse, Alex Wood, Jim Johnson, Luis Avilán, and José Peraza, while the Miami Marlins acquired minor league pitchers Victor Araujo, Jeff Brigham, and Kevin Guzman, and the Braves received Héctor Olivera, Paco Rodriguez, minor league pitcher Zachary Bird and a competitive balance draft pick for the 2016 MLB draft. He did not appear in any games in 2015 for any team and the Dodgers declined his 2016 option, making him a free agent.

=== Washington Nationals ===
==== 2016 ====
On January 26, 2016, Arroyo signed a minor league contract with the Washington Nationals that included an invitation to major league spring training. He pitched only 9 innings in the organization, in the Gulf Coast League, and was shut down due to elbow soreness. On October 11, 2016, Arroyo was released.

=== Second stint with the Reds ===
==== 2017 ====
Arroyo revealed that his previous elbow problems have been relieved by stem-cell injections he received in August. On February 2, 2017, Arroyo signed a minor league contract with the Cincinnati Reds that included an invitation to spring training. On June 19, Arroyo was placed on the 10-day disabled list with a right shoulder injury, and he admitted that he was contemplating retirement, stating "I don't see myself ponying it up next year." Arroyo declined the opportunity to pitch one inning in September to close out his career, as he wanted to give a chance to a younger pitcher. On September 23, the Reds honored Arroyo with "Kickin' it With Bronson" night. Prior to the game, a ceremony was held with video tributes from manager Bryan Price and singer Eddie Vedder. After the game, Arroyo held a concert on the field, performing Pearl Jam covers with his band. Arroyo ended the season with a 3–6 record and 7.35 ERA in 14 starts. On September 24, he officially announced his retirement.

== Possible use of performance-enhancing drugs ==
A day after reports claimed former Red Sox teammate David Ortiz was among 104 Major League players to have failed drug tests in 2003, Arroyo revealed he had used androstenedione and amphetamines in his career. Arroyo remarked that he would not be surprised if he was among the 104 players that failed tests, as he suspected the androstenedione he was taking may have been tainted with steroids.

His name was not among those revealed in the Mitchell Report.

== Pitching style ==
Arroyo's fastball was in the 85–89 miles per hour range. While this is considered below average speed among major league pitchers, his fastball had excellent movement and Arroyo was adept at "spotting" it. He also threw a hard slider that moved away from right-handed batters, and a straight changeup as well. Arroyo's best pitch was his curveball, which he threw from multiple arm angles and was known to throw it in any count. The angle of the curveball itself could vary from a straight 12–6 to a sweeping 1–7. Arroyo's delivery was somewhat unusual; he incorporated a large leg kick in his pitching motion, extending his front leg completely straight and lifting it up to a level above his waist before delivering the ball. His kick often appeared to reach head level and deceives hitters with its exaggerated motion. From the stretch position with runners on base, his leg-kick was much less pronounced and his delivery to home plate was very quick by major league standards. As a result, Arroyo was one of the better pitchers at holding runners on base.

== Music ==
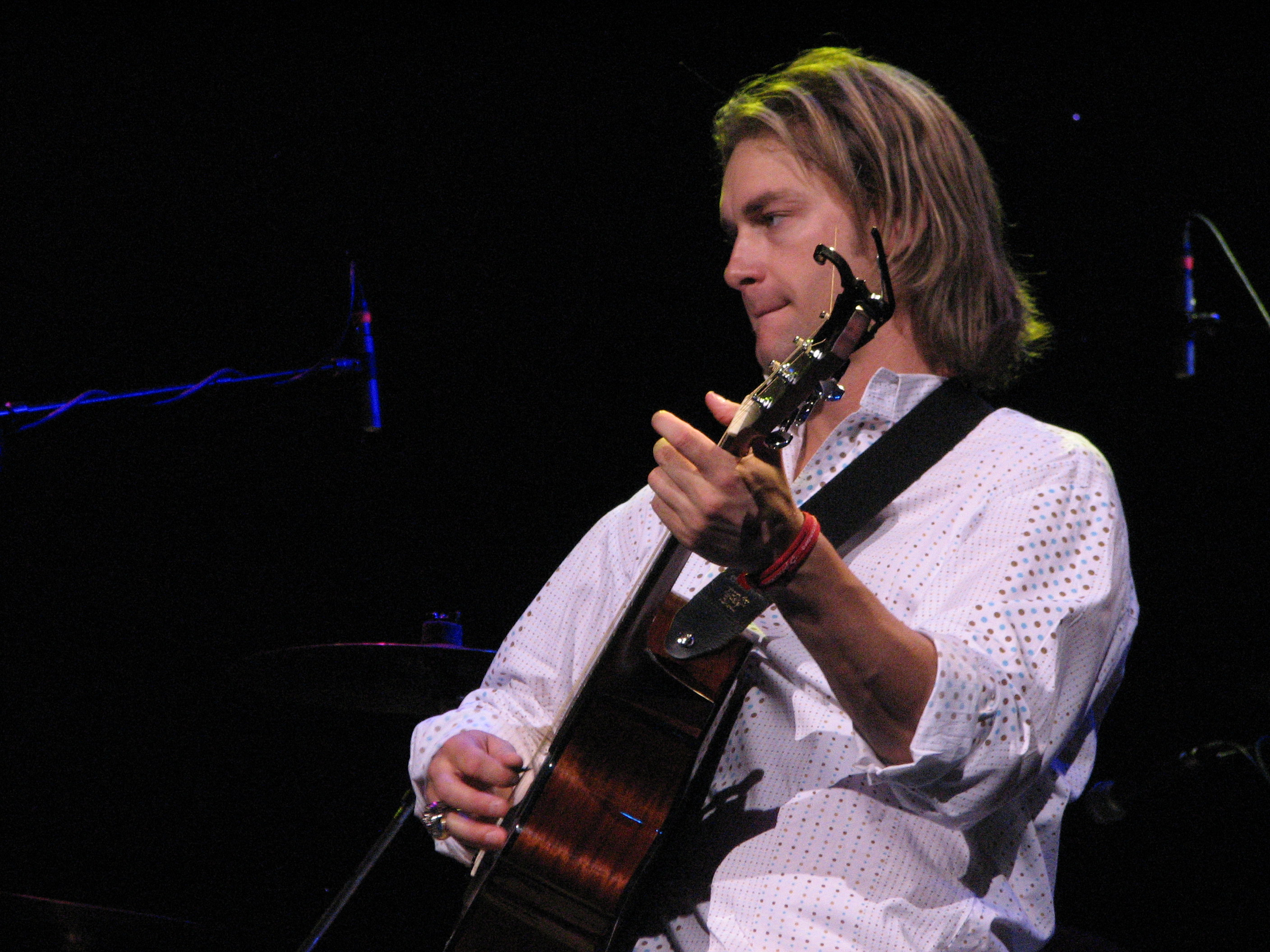
Bronson Arroyo concert at Mohegan Sun in January 2008

In 2005, Bronson Arroyo released his debut album, Covering the Bases. It included covers from bands such as Pearl Jam, Alice in Chains, Stone Temple Pilots, Foo Fighters and Incubus. The album also includes the Red Sox victory song "Dirty Water" by The Standells, in which Arroyo is accompanied by Johnny Damon, Lenny DiNardo, and Kevin Youkilis. He also taught Kevin Millar how to play guitar and performed vocals for the song "Tessie" as covered by the Dropkick Murphys.

In 2008, commercials for JTM Food Group featuring a 'music video' by Arroyo; also featuring FSN Ohio color analyst and former Cincinnati Reds player Chris Welsh began airing during Cincinnati Reds games.

Arroyo appears as a vocalist on the song "Since You" on Chad Perrone's album, Wake.

Bronson made his public debut on stage in January 2004 at the Hot Stove Cool Music fundraiser at the Paradise Rock Club in Boston. He performed a cover of Pearl Jam's "Black" with teammate Kevin Millar. He later performed full sets at four other Hot Stove Cool Music events with a full band that featured saxophonist Elan Trotman and two members of Gnarls Barkley (drummer Eric Gardner and guitarist Clint Walsh).

In July 2020, Arroyo collaborated with classical pianist Harrison Sheckler to create a virtual choir recording of "Take Me Out to the Ballgame". Current and former players, including Cy Young winner Bret Saberhagen, as well as announcers and other baseball personalities, were among the final 200 participants in the choir.

In 2024, Arroyo competed in season twelve of "The Masked Singer" as "Sherlock Hound" and had Barry Zito (who competed in season three as "Rhino") serving as his Mask Ambassador. He was eliminated in "Group C Finals: Peanuts Thanksgiving" alongside Jana Kramer as "Royal Knight".

== Personal life ==
Arroyo was married to Aimee Faught from 2000 to 2008. He and Nicole McNees married in 2021 and reside in the Cincinnati area.

== Accolades ==
Arroyo appeared on the 2023 ballot for the National Baseball Hall of Fame. He received one vote (0.3%), thus dropping off future ballots.

On October 26, 2023, Arroyo was inducted into the Cincinnati Reds team Hall of Fame.

== See also ==
- List of Cuban Americans
