= Steelheart =

American glam metal band

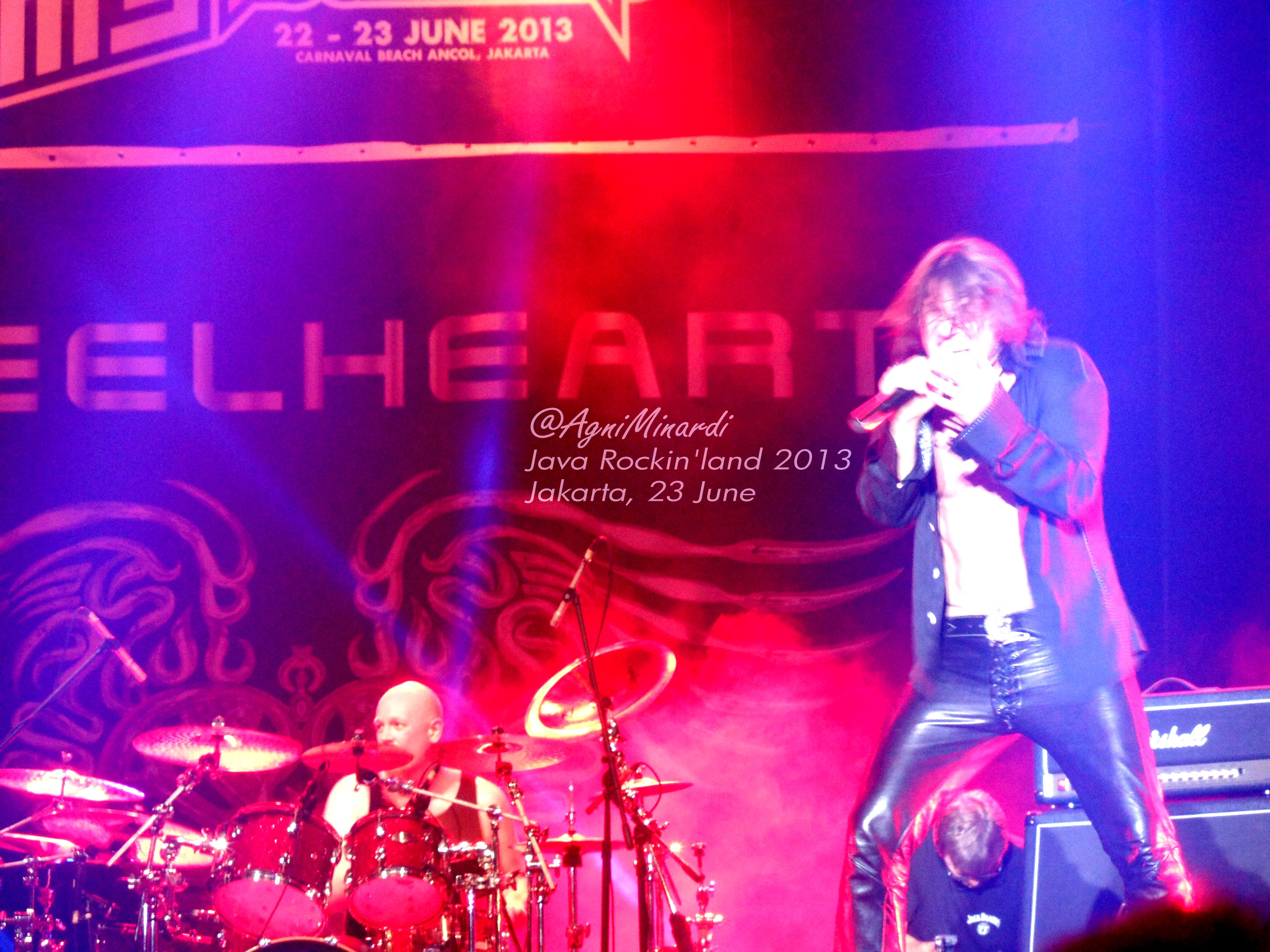
- Steelheart in 2013

Background information
- Also known as: Red Alert
- Origin: Norwalk, Connecticut, U.S.
- Genres: Hard rock; glam metal; heavy metal
- Years active: 1989–1992; 1996–present
- Labels: MCA; MCM/Steelheart; Frontiers
- Members: Miljenko Matijevic; Mike Humbert; Joe Pessia; James Ward
- Past members: Chris Risola; Frank DiConstanzo; John Fowler; Kenny Kanowski; Vincent Mele; Alex Makarovich; Sigve Sjursen; Bill Lonero; Jack Wilkenson; Joe Henderson; Rev Jones; Uros Raskovski; Marten Andersson
- Website: steelheart.com

Steelheart is an American glam metal band from Norwalk, Connecticut, that formed in 1989. At the time that their debut was recorded, the band's members consisted of vocalist Miljenko Matijevic, lead guitarist Chris Risola, rhythm guitarist Frank DiCostanzo, bassist James Ward and the now deceased drummer John Fowler. The current lineup contains Miljenko Matijevic, Mike Humbert, Joe Pessia and James Ward.

Steelheart's debut album, the self-titled Steelheart (1990), which was released on May 10, 1990, was certified gold by the RIAA on July 30, 1991, mainly on the strength of the single "I'll Never Let You Go" which reached No. 23 on the Billboard Hot 100. It was their only major hit in the US, making them a one-hit wonder.

== History ==
Steelheart was initially formed as a band called Red Alert, whose members included James Ward (bass), Chris Risola (lead guitar), Jack Wilkenson (drums) and Miljenko Matijevic ('Mike', vocals). Former Rage of Angels members, rhythm guitarist Frank DiCostanzo and drummer John Fowler joined when Jack Wilkenson left. But after moving to L.A. and getting a record deal and a manager, the band ultimately decided to change their name to Steelheart. The band's debut album, the self-titled Steelheart, was released on May 10, 1990, and reached #40 on the Billboard 200 and was certified Gold by the RIAA after one year, in 1991.

Steelheart's second album, Tangled in Reins, was released in 1992, reaching No. 144 on the Billboard charts. The album had significantly less success than its predecessor in the US, because it only reached #144 on the Billboard 200, and none of the released singles charted. The single "Mama Don't You Cry" charted No. 1 in many East Asian Countries, including Hong Kong, leading to an Asian tour in September 1992. Towards the end of their tour of Asia, Steelheart was asked by Slaughter to open for them at a show in Denver, Colorado on Halloween night in 1992. While performing "Dancing in the Fire" from their Tangled in Reins album, Matijevic climbed an unsecured lighting truss, which fell toward the stage. In an attempt to evade it, the truss landed on top of him, crushing him face first into the stage. Matijevic suffered a broken nose, cheekbone, jaw and a twisted spine.

In 1996, a revamped lineup of Steelheart emerged with guitarist Kenny Kanowski, bassist Vincent Mele and drummer Alex Makarovich, leaving Matijevic as the last original member. The new Steelheart recorded and released the album Wait, despite their past two albums being filled with high powered glam metal, this album has more of an alternative metal sound. Original member James Ward joined Steelheart on the tour supporting the album. Though the album failed to chart in the US, the track "We All Die Young" was featured in the motion picture Rock Star, starring Mark Wahlberg and Jennifer Aniston.

In late 2006, the EP Just a Taste was released, three tracks on it would be released again on the 2008 album Good 2B Alive, and the other track "We All Die Young" was previously put out on Wait and the Rock Star soundtrack.

In 2016, Steelheart appeared at the three-day Rockingham 2016, glam metal festival with Marten Andersson from Lynch Mob and Lizzy Borden on bass, in Nottingham, United Kingdom on October 22, as the headline act of the second day.

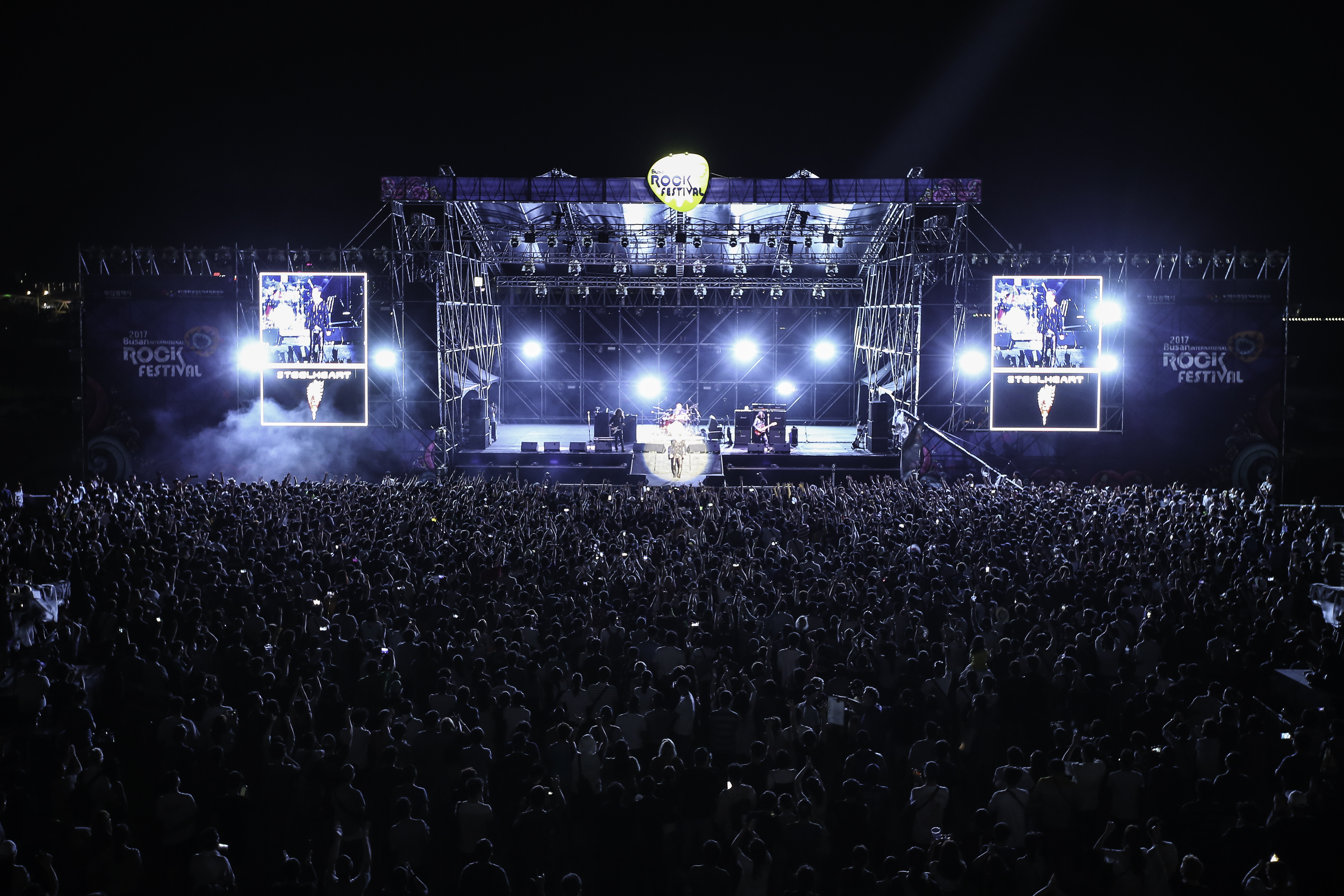
SteelHeart Busan Korea 2017

Steelheart released the album, Through Worlds of Stardust, in 2017 and the live album, Rock'n Milan, in 2018.

== Band members ==
=== Current members ===
- Miljenko Matijevic – lead vocals, rhythm and acoustic guitar, piano (1989–1992, 1996, 2006–present)
- James Ward – bass, piano, backing vocals (1989–1992, 1996, 2023–present)
- Mike Humbert – drums, percussion (2006–present)
- Joe Pessia – lead guitar (2017–present)

=== Past members ===
- Chris Risola – lead guitar, backing vocals (1989–1992, 2006–2014)
- Frank DiCostanzo – rhythm guitar, bass, backing vocals (1989–1992)
- Jack Wilkenson – drums (1989–1990)
- John Fowler – drums (1990–1992; died 2008)
- Kenny Kanowski – lead guitar (1996; died 2017)
- Vincent Mele – bass (1996)
- Alex Makarovich – drums (1996)
- Bill Lonero – lead guitar (2008)
- Sigve Sjursen – bass (2006–2007)
- Rev Jones – bass (2007–2016)
- Uros Raskovski – lead guitar (2006–2008, 2009–2010, 2014–2017)
- Marten Andersson – bass (2016–2022)

== Discography ==
=== Albums ===
- Steelheart (1990)
- Tangled in Reins (1992)
- Wait (1996)
- Good 2B Alive (2008)
- Through Worlds of Stardust (2017)

=== Live Albums ===
- Rock'N Milan (2018)

=== Compilations ===
- 30 (2022)

=== EPs ===
- Just a Taste EP (2006)

=== Singles ===
Year	Single	Chart positions	
Year	Single	US Hot 100	US Main Rock
1990	"Can't Stop Me Lovin' You"	—	—
1991	"I'll Never Let You Go"	23	24
1991	"She's Gone"	59	—
1991	"Everybody Loves Eileen"	—	34
1992	"Mama Don't You Cry"	—	—
1996	"Wait"	—	—
2008	"Good 2B Alive"	—	—
2011	"Black Dog" (Led Zeppelin cover)	—	—
2017	"Got Me Runnin"	—	—
2017	"Lips of Rain"	—	—
2020	"My Freedom"	—	—

=== Video albums ===
Year	Title	Certifications
1992	Steelheart – The Videos Pioneer Artists, Laserdisc	—
2006	Steelheart – Still Hard Steelheart Records, DVD	—

== See also ==
- List of glam metal bands and artists
