= Rock Star (2001 film) =

2001 film by Stephen Herek

- Theatrical release poster
- Directed by: Stephen Herek
- Written by: John Stockwell
- Produced by: Robert Lawrence; Toby Jaffe
- Starring: Mark Wahlberg; Jennifer Aniston; Jason Flemyng; Timothy Olyphant; Timothy Spall; Dominic West
- Cinematography: Ueli Steiger
- Edited by: Trudy Ship
- Music by: Trevor Rabin
- Production companies: Bel-Air Entertainment; Maysville Pictures
- Distributed by: Warner Bros. Pictures
- Release date: September 7, 2001
- Running time: 105 minutes
- Country: United States
- Language: English
- Budget: $38–57 million
- Box office: $19.3 million

Rock Star is a 2001 American musical comedy-drama film directed by Stephen Herek, written by John Stockwell, and starring Mark Wahlberg and Jennifer Aniston. It tells the story of Chris "Izzy" Cole, a tribute band singer who ascends to the position of lead vocalist in his favorite band.

The script was inspired by the real-life story of Tim "Ripper" Owens, a singer in a Judas Priest tribute band who was chosen to replace singer Rob Halford when he temporarily left the band. After optioning the filming rights to a New York Times profile of Owens by Andrew Revkin, Warner Bros. Pictures hired Stockwell to write the script. Brad Pitt was initially signed to play the lead role, but left due to creative differences, and Wahlberg was eventually hired for the part.

Rock Star was released by Warner Bros. Pictures on September 7, 2001, garnered mixed reviews from critics, and was a box office failure, grossing $19.3 million worldwide against a production budget of $38–57 million.

== Plot ==
In 1985, Pittsburgh resident Chris Cole is a fanatical admirer of heavy metal band Steel Dragon. By day, Chris is a photocopier technician and by night, he is the lead singer of Blood Pollution, a Steel Dragon tribute band.

Internal struggles among the actual Steel Dragon band members culminate in firing their lead singer, Bobby Beers, and the beginning of recruitment sessions to find a new vocalist. During a Blood Pollution show, guitarist Rob Malcolm plays a guitar solo instead of following the note-for-note accuracy of the original Steel Dragon song. Furious, Chris sabotages Rob's amplifier mid-song, causing a fight between the two onstage. The next day, Chris goes to rehearsal but discovers he has been replaced by his arch-rival Bradley, the erstwhile lead vocalist of another Steel Dragon tribute band. Rob criticizes Chris for preferring to remain the singer in a tribute band rather than create his own music.

Chris eventually receives a phone call from Steel Dragon's founder and rhythm guitarist, Kirk Cuddy, and is offered an audition for the band. At the studio, he meets the band, as well as them arguing with Beers, who is being kicked out for not turning up for recording sessions, missing gigs, and lackluster performances. Chris sings a song. (Note: The song is "We All Die Young". It is a Steel Dragon song in the movie, but it is an actual song by Steelheart, whose lead vocalist, Miljenko Matijevic, provides Cole's singing voice for the film.) Chris joins the band as their new singer, adopting the stage name "Izzy." The band embarks on a tour, and Izzy experiences the excesses of the lifestyle.

Because of his new lifestyle, Izzy's girlfriend Emily Poule decides not to continue with him throughout the remainder of the tour. However, Emily and Izzy agree to get back together when the tour reaches Seattle. Eventually, Steel Dragon stops in Seattle for a show, and Emily arrives at his hotel room as they had previously arranged. Although Izzy has become so drunk while on tour, forgets about the arrangement and does not even know what city he is in. Although taken aback by all the groupies, Emily still tries to reconnect with Izzy, reminding him of their plans to meet up once he gets to Seattle; however, he is too intoxicated to understand what she is saying, eventually suggesting they go to Seattle together. Heartbroken, Emily leaves him.

Six months later, Izzy reports to the next series of Steel Dragon recording sessions with song concepts and artwork for the band's next album. The rest of the band likes his ideas, but rejects them, with Kirk explaining that the band has to stay true to the "Steel Dragon thing" to fulfill fan expectations. Izzy is angered upon realizing he was only recruited for his vocal abilities.

On the next tour, Izzy hears a fan singing along with him toward the end of a live concert. Impressed, Chris invites the fan onstage, and the pair perform together on stage with the band while imitating Chris's established stage performance/act. After the song, Chris and the fan exit backstage, and the fan introduces himself as Thor while expressing to Chris his appreciation for the band and spiritual love for Chris himself. Chris offers Thor to "blow the roof off" by taking his place on stage - essentially finishing the set. Thor accepts and proceeds to assume the lead singer role and perform with the rest of the band. Chris exits the stage, approaches Mats, the group's road manager, and says he is going to take a piss - which is code for he is leaving for good. Mats nods and Chris departs the concert.

After leaving Steel Dragon and ditching his rock star image and stage name, Chris travels to Seattle and starts a new band with Rob, allowing him to write his music. Chris finds Emily working in the coffee shop that she and her roommate purchased years earlier, and he is initially too ashamed to speak to her. While walking one evening, Emily sees a flyer for his band posted on the wall and takes it down. Chris later sings with his band in a bar, and Emily walks in. Chris leaves the stage and speaks to her. They reconcile and kiss. Chris then plays his first original song. (Note: The song, "Colorful", is an actual song by the Verve Pipe.)

== Cast ==
The band members are portrayed by ex-Dokken and current Foreigner bassist Jeff Pilson; Black Label Society founder and Ozzy Osbourne guitarist Zakk Wylde; actor Dominic West; and ex-Foreigner and Black Country Communion drummer Jason Bonham (the son of the late John Bonham, drummer for Led Zeppelin). Myles Kennedy, who was at the time the lead vocalist of the Mayfield Four and now the front man of Alter Bridge and Slash's solo project, makes a cameo appearance.

The singing voice for Wahlberg's character was provided by Steelheart frontman Miljenko Matijevic for the Steel Dragon Songs, and the final number was sung by Brian Vander Ark of The Verve Pipe. Jeff Scott Soto (of Talisman, Yngwie Malmsteen, Soul SirkUS, and Journey) provided the voice of Jason Flemyng's character Bobby Beers. Ralph Saenz (aka Michael Starr of Steel Panther) also appears briefly, as the singer auditioning ahead of Chris at the studio.

Tribute band Blood Pollution is also made up of known musical artists, including guitarist Nick Catanese (Black Label Society), drummer Blas Elias (Slaughter), and bassist Brian Vander Ark (The Verve Pipe, who also contributed a song to the film's soundtrack). Actor Timothy Olyphant portrays Blood Pollution's guitarist, Rob Malcolm. Bradley, the singer who replaces Chris in Blood Pollution, is played by Third Eye Blind frontman Stephan Jenkins.

- Mark Wahlberg as Chris "Izzy" Cole, Blood Pollution lead vocalist
- Jennifer Aniston as Emily Poule, Blood Pollution manager
- Jason Flemyng as Bobby Beers, Steel Dragon lead vocalist
- Timothy Olyphant as Rob Malcolm, Blood Pollution guitarist
- Timothy Spall as Mats, Steel Dragon road manager
- Dominic West as Kirk Cuddy, Steel Dragon rhythm guitarist
- Matthew Glave as Joe Cole Jr.
- Beth Grant as Mrs. Tess Cole
- Dagmara Domińczyk as Tania Asher
- Jason Bonham as A.C., Steel Dragon drummer
- Blas Elias as Donny Johnson, Blood Pollution drummer
- Stephan Jenkins as Bradley
- Jeff Pilson as Jörgen, Steel Dragon bassist
- Brian Vander Ark as Ricki Bell, Blood Pollution bassist
- Michael Shamus Wiles as Mr. Joe Cole Sr.
- Zakk Wylde as Ghode, Steel Dragon lead guitarist
- Heidi Mark as Kirk's Wife
- Nick Catanese as Xander Cummins, Blood Pollution guitarist
- Carey Lessard as Nina
- Kristin Richardson as Samantha
- Kara Zediker as Marci, Rob's girlfriend
- Colleen Ann Fitzpatrick as Fan, a guitarist in crowd outside mansion
- Myles Kennedy as Thor / Mike
- Rachel Hunter as A.C.'s wife
- Carrie Stevens as Ghode's Wife
- Amy Rolle as Jörgen's Wife
- Ralph Saenz as Auditioning Singer, Ralph

== Production ==
After The New York Times ran a story on Tim "Ripper" Owens in 1997, various Hollywood studios ran to option the filming rights. Warner Bros. Pictures won the bid, and hired John Stockwell to write the script. Stockwell soon began researching the heavy metal music and tribute band scene and visited Owens' hometown of Akron, Ohio. Afterwards the project, under the working title Metal God, got the involvement of George Clooney's newly founded Maysville Pictures. Brad Pitt signed to star in 1998, but wound up dropping the project following creative differences with the studio. Eventually Mark Wahlberg, a former rapper with Marky Mark and the Funky Bunch who co-starred with Clooney in Three Kings, was hired for the main role in May 1999. Stephen Herek signed to direct in October, and the following month Jennifer Aniston became attached for the main female role, while Callie Khouri was hired to revise the script. Judas Priest were initially approached, but the band had some objections to the initial script and were phased out as it was rewritten into a more original story loosely based on the facts, in spite of the band still offering to give advice and assistance to the production.

Wahlberg spent five months preparing for his role as Chris Cole, working with a vocal coach, growing his hair, attending the metal scene and wandering around Los Angeles in-character. A concert scene was shot at the Los Angeles Memorial Sports Arena before 10,000 Metallica and Megadeth fans. While filming one Steel Dragon performance, the crew pranked Wahlberg by playing Marky Mark's "Good Vibrations" instead of a rock track, and footage of this is featured during the film's end credits. By 2001, Warner renamed the project from Metal God to Rock Star in order to attract a broader rock fandom instead of just metal fans.

== Reception ==
The film opened at No. 4 at the U.S. box office taking US$6,018,636 in its opening weekend, and grossing a domestic total of $17,008,282 and $2,325,863 internationally for a worldwide gross of $19,334,145; based on a $57 million budget, Rock Star was a box office bomb.

On the review aggregator website Rotten Tomatoes, 53% of 129 critics' reviews are positive, with an average rating of 5.4/10. The website's consensus reads: "Like its title, Rock Star is rather generic, being not so much about the heavy metal scene than about rock cliches and formula." Metacritic, which uses a weighted average, assigned the film a score of 54 out of 100, based on 32 critics, indicating "mixed or average" reviews. Audiences surveyed by CinemaScore gave the film a grade "B−" on scale of A to F.

Roger Ebert of the Chicago Sun-Times gave it 2.5 out of 4 stars and wrote: "By the end of the film I conceded, yes, there are good performances and the period is well captured, but the movie didn't convince me of the feel and the flavor of its experiences."

Tim "Ripper" Owens, the inspiration for the story, noted to Rolling Stone that while he considered Rock Star "a Spinal Tap kind of movie" that distanced from the real facts to feature "all the cliches of sex, drugs, and rock and roll", he found the portrayal of the band members as accurate and was still flattered to become the basis for a movie. When Judas Priest bassist Ian Hill was asked about his reaction to Rock Star in an interview in PopMatters magazine, he said "I mean, I quite enjoyed the movie. It was entertaining, you know?" Hill said, "It had nothing to do with Rob Halford, Ripper Owens and Judas Priest, it's got nothing to do with that, whatsoever. It was fiction. Apart from the fact that 'Local Boy Makes Good'? That was the only true aspect of the movie." Hill was quick to add, "I watched it once. I don't have the urge to watch it again."

== Soundtrack ==
Rock Star

Soundtrack album by various artists
- Released: August 28, 2001
- Genre: Rock
- Label: Priority

Professional ratings
Review scores
Source	Rating
AllMusic	2.5/5 stars

A small number of the songs featured in the film and on the soundtrack were released after the dates given in the film. They are marked with an asterisk.

No.	Title	Artist	Length
1.	"Rock Star" (Art Alexakis)	Everclear	3:30
2.	"Livin' the Life" (Steve Plunkett, Peter Beckett)	Steel Dragon	3:14
3.	"Wild Side*" (Vince Neil, Nikki Sixx, Tommy Lee)	Mötley Crüe	4:34
4.	"We All Die Young*" (Miljenko Matijevic, Kenny Kanowski)	Steel Dragon	4:01
5.	"Blood Pollution" (Twiggy Ramirez)	Steel Dragon	3:59
6.	"Livin' on a Prayer*" (Jon Bon Jovi, Richie Sambora, Desmond Child)	Bon Jovi	4:08
7.	"Stand Up" (Sammy Hagar)	Steel Dragon	4:18
8.	"Stranglehold" (Ted Nugent)	Ted Nugent	8:23
9.	"Wasted Generation" (Desmond Child, A. Allen (A. Jay Popoff), J. Allen (Jeremy Popoff))	Steel Dragon	2:54
10.	"Lick It Up" (Paul Stanley, Vinnie Vincent)	Kiss	3:56
11.	"Long Live Rock 'n' Roll" (Ronnie James Dio, Ritchie Blackmore)	Steel Dragon	3:27
12.	"Devil Inside*" (Andrew Farriss, Michael Hutchence)	INXS	5:13
13.	"Colorful" (Brian Vander Ark)	The Verve Pipe	4:25
14.	"Gotta Have It" (Trevor Rabin)	Trevor Rabin	2:57
Total length:			58:59

Partial list of songs that were featured in the movie but did not appear on the soundtrack CD:

- AC/DC – "Are You Ready"*
- Culture Club – "Karma Chameleon"
- Def Leppard – "Let's Get Rocked"*
- Def Leppard – "Rock! Rock! (Till You Drop)"
- Foghat – "Chateau Lafitte '59 Boogie"
- Frankie Goes to Hollywood – "Relax"
- Marky Mark and the Funky Bunch – "Good Vibrations"
- Ralph Saenz, Peter Beckett, and Steve Plunkett – "California Girls" (The Beach Boys cover)
- Talking Heads – "Once in a Lifetime"
- Steel Dragon – "Reckless" (Phoenix Down cover)
- Jennifer Aniston - Believe in Me
- Trevor Rabin - Batman Theme
- Steel Dragon - Crown of Falsehood (written by Zakk Wylde)
- Pat King & Brian Grant - Sheedy's

=== Year-end charts ===
Year-end chart performance for Rock Star
Chart (2002)	Position
Canadian Metal Albums (Nielsen SoundScan)	63

== Home media ==
The film was released on DVD and VHS on January 22, 2002, by Warner Home Video.
