= Angelo Barbera =

American bass player

- Genres: Rock
- Occupation: Musician
- Instruments: Bass guitar, guitar, keyboards
- Years active: 1990s–present

Angelo Barbera is an American bass player best known for his work with the Robby Krieger Band and The Doors of the 21st Century.

== Life and career ==
Angelo grew up in southern California and was inspired to take up the bass guitar at the age of 12 after meeting Linda Ronstadt's bass player at a concert. He says that his favorite bass player and biggest influence is John Paul Jones of Led Zeppelin. In addition to bass, Barbera can also play guitar and keyboards.

During the 1990s, Barbera worked with such musicians and bands as The Motels featuring Martha Davis, Red Square Black, Lita Ford, and Los Angeles based Rock Pop band, Perfect Stranger (band). In 2000, he auditioned for, and joined, the Robby Krieger Band, led by Robby Krieger of The Doors. Later that year, he joined Krieger, Ray Manzarek, and John Densmore in the last full reunion of The Doors on VH1 Storytellers, where they performed with guest singers Scott Stapp, Scott Weiland, Ian Astbury, and Travis Meeks. In 2002, he joined Krieger and Manzarek in their Doors revival band The Doors of the 21st Century (later known as Manzarek-Krieger) and he stayed with them for a few years before being replaced by Phil Chen because of his fear of flying.

Since leaving The Doors of the 21st Century, Barbera has worked with his new band I-94 (formerly Bottlefly).
