= The Verve Pipe =

American alternative rock band

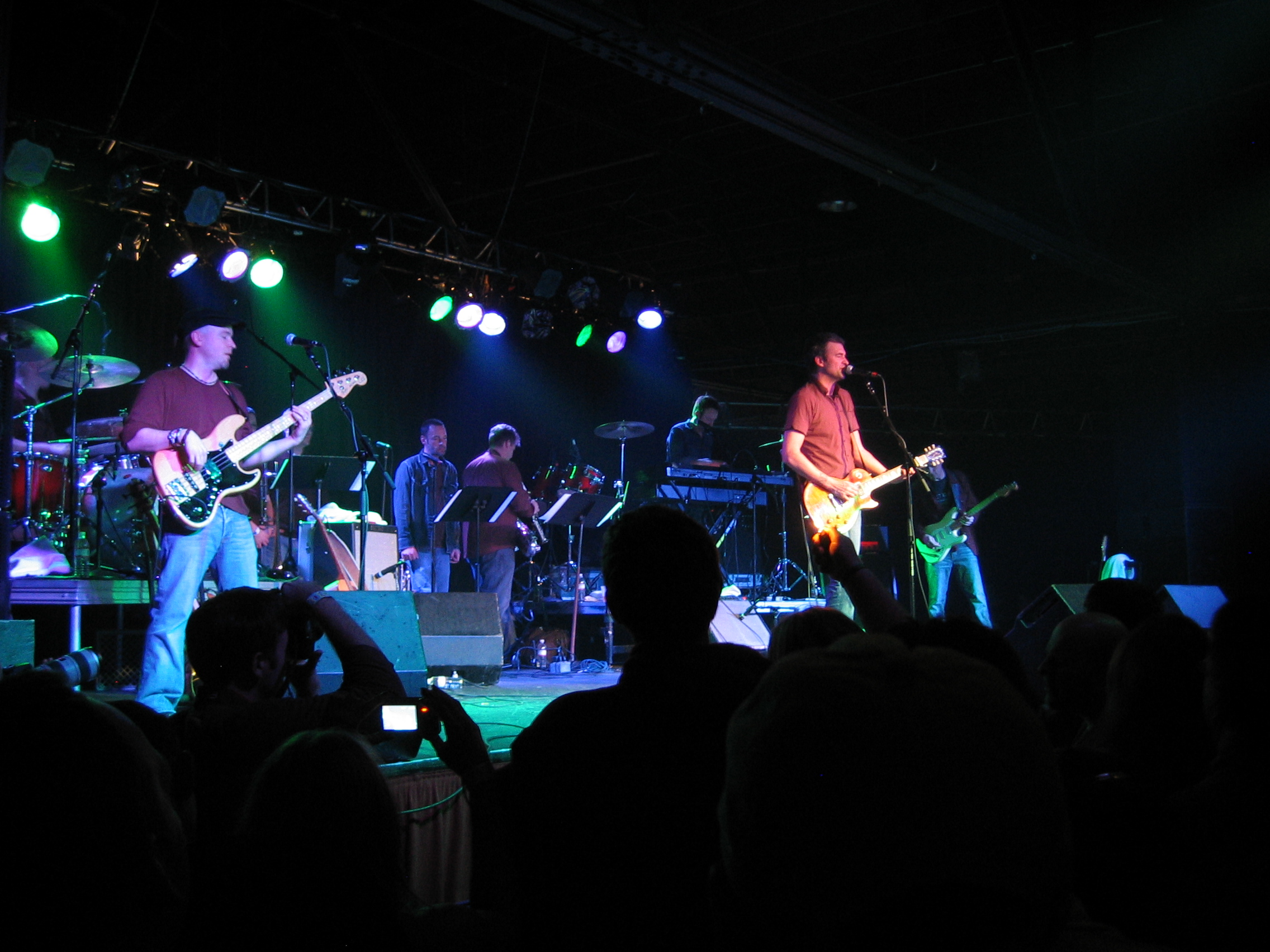
- The Verve Pipe performing in 2007.

Background information
- Origin: East Lansing, Michigan, U.S.
- Genres: Alternative rock, post-grunge
- Years active: 1992–present
- Labels: RCA; Lmno Pop
- Members: Brian Vander Ark; Brad Vander Ark; Channing Lee; Lou Musa; Daine Hammerle
- Past members: Donny Brown; A.J. Dunning; Sam Briggs; Brian Stout; Doug Corella; Andy Reed; Scott Stefanski; John Connors; Todd Long; Joel Ferguson; Zach Dubay; Brian Vannieuwenhoven; Randy Sly
- Website: www.thevervepipe.com

The Verve Pipe is an American rock band from East Lansing, Michigan. They were formed in 1992 by Brian Vander Ark (vocals, guitar), Brad Vander Ark (bass), Brian Stout (guitar), and Donny Brown (drums). They are widely known for their songs "The Freshmen" and "Photograph".

== History ==
=== Formation, I've Suffered a Head Injury, and Pop Smear (1992–1995) ===
In November 1992, Brian Vander Ark of the band Johnny with an Eye signed a production deal with producer/engineer Thomas Jansen, owner of Station C Studios Inc. After Jansen produced, recorded and mixed all Johnny with an Eye tracks, Jansen was looking for a little more from the band. During this same period of time, Jansen was courting Don Brown's Water for the Pool band to come over and record the rest of their album at Station C Studios. Jon Frazer was then given the job of engineering the rest of their album project. In a conversation with Vander Ark, Jansen advised Vander Ark to call Brown to join the band with one guitar member of Water for the Pool. Frazer then engineered Brown's drums and vocals, and Stout's guitars and vocals, on Johnny with an Eye songs, and Vander Arks's guitar and vocals on Water for the Pool songs. Frazer also did the mixing and the new band, The Verve Pipe, released their first album, I've Suffered a Head Injury. The original ten-song version of the CD is no longer available. A seven-song version, without the original recording of "The Freshmen", was later released as an EP. The band, known for its energetic live performances, built strong followings during its early years, especially in the college towns of Kalamazoo, Mt. Pleasant, and East Lansing.

In the fall of 1993, the band released a second album, Pop Smear, again working with Jansen for pre-production and basic tracks and Frazer with overdubs and mixing, which helped them gain a devoted following in their native state of Michigan and their eventual signing with RCA Records in 1995. A.J. Dunning replaced Stout on guitar for the recording of Pop Smear and remained in the band for their three RCA records. Pop Smear featured the popular tracks "Spoonful of Sugar" and "Victoria".

=== Villains, The Verve Pipe, and Underneath (1996–2008) ===
The band's first major label release was 1996's Villains, which was a minor hit and launched two Billboard Hot 100 charting singles, the first being "Photograph", which charted at #53, then the #5 hit "The Freshmen", which became their most popular single. The songs "Cup of Tea" and "Villains" also charted at #35 and #24 on the Mainstream Rock chart. The Verve Pipe went on tour with Tonic in the summer of 1997. On June 28, 1997, the band performed at Edgefest in Barrie, Canada. While performing, someone in the crowd threw a beer bottle towards the stage and it hit Brian Vander Ark in the cheek. The band then left the stage to seek medical attention. Villains was certified platinum by the RIAA in 1997.

In 1999, the band came back with a new album, The Verve Pipe, along with the single "Hero". The album, however, failed to achieve the commercial appeal of its predecessor. In 2001, the band released their next album, Underneath, along with the single, "Never Let You Down". The album also includes the song "Colorful", which was featured on the soundtrack of the film Rock Star, and "Happiness Is", featured on the soundtrack of the film Joe Somebody. Brian Vander Ark released his first solo album in 2003 and his second album in 2006. The Verve Pipe released an EP of Christmas music called A Homemade Holiday in 2007.

=== A Family Album and Are We There Yet? (2009–2013) ===
On September 15, 2009, Brian Vander Ark announced on his website that the band would be releasing a new album called A Family Album in October 2009. The band had been approached to contribute a song for a compilation album called Calling All Kids, which led to them creating an "entire album of family[-]friendly songs". It was also noted in the announcement that a new album of rock material was in the works. Immediately after the release of the family album, the band undertook a series of small-venue performances, mostly around Michigan and the East Coast. The band released another family album called Are We There Yet? in 2013.

=== Overboard and Parachute (2014–2019) ===
On March 28, 2014, the band announced on their Facebook page that their first studio album since 2001, titled Overboard, would be released on June 17, 2014, and would be followed with a tour. The first single from the album, titled "Crash Landing", was released on April 1, 2014. The title track was co-written by actor Jeff Daniels, who is a close friend of Brian Vander Ark. The Verve Pipe performed at the revived H.O.R.D.E. festival on July 9, 2015 at DTE Energy Music Theatre in Clarkston, Michigan. In the years that followed, the band toured regularly, building up to the 20th anniversary of 1996's Villains, which they celebrated by playing the album acoustically in its entirety at Ann Arbor's The Ark. The performance was released as a live album in 2017. The Verve Pipe issued their next album, Parachute, on February 17, 2017. It is the band's first album to feature songwriter and co-vocalist Channing Lee.

=== Threads and Reconciled (2020–present) ===
The band released the album, Threads, on November 5, 2021, followed by a supporting tour. The Verve Pipe's bassist, Joel Ferguson, decided to step down from performing and focus on producing, which created the opportunity for Brad Vander Ark to rejoin the band. The Verve Pipe's next album, Reconciled, was released on July 25, 2025. It is the first album since 2001's Underneath to feature bassist Brad Vander Ark. For the first time in decades, the band sequestered itself to work out songs for the new album, spending time at a cabin in Boon in northern Michigan, with all of the members participating in writing. The album release was followed by a supporting tour. In December 2025, it was announced that The Verve Pipe would go on tour with Our Lady Peace in 2026.

== Musical style and influences ==
The Verve Pipe's musical style has been described as alternative rock and post-grunge. Some of the band's influences include The Beatles, Harry Chapin, James Taylor, Cat Stevens, and XTC.

== Band members ==
Current members

- Brian Vander Ark – lead and backing vocals, guitar
- Brad Vander Ark – bass, backing vocals
- Channing Lee – lead and backing vocals, keyboards
- Lou Musa – guitar
- Daine Hammerle – drums

Former members

- Brian Stout – guitar
- Donny Brown – drums, backing vocals
- A.J. Dunning – guitar
- Doug Corella – keyboards
- Todd Long – drums
- Zach Dubay – drums
- John Connors – bass
- Scott Stefanski – drums
- Andy Reed – bass
- Joel Ferguson – bass
- Sam Briggs – drums
- Brian Vannieuwenhoven – drums
- Randy Sly – keyboards

== Discography ==
=== Studio albums ===
- I've Suffered a Head Injury (1992) (Note: I've Suffered a Head Injury was initially released as a full-length album, but a condensed EP version was eventually released which saw wider distribution.)
- Pop Smear (1993)
- Villains (1996) No. 24 US (RIAA: Platinum)
- The Verve Pipe (1999) No. 158 US
- Underneath (2001)
- Overboard (2014)
- Parachute (2017)
- Threads (2021)
- Reconciled (2025)

=== Family albums ===
- A Family Album (2009)
- Are We There Yet? (2013)

=== EPs ===
- A Homemade Holiday (2007)

=== Compilation albums ===
- Platinum & Gold Collection (2004)
- Super Hits (2007)
- Villains - Live & Acoustic (2017)

=== Singles ===
| Title | Year | Peak chart positions | | | | | | | | | Certifications | Album |
| Title | Year | US | US Adult | US Alt. | US Main. Rock | US Pop | AUS | CAN | CAN Rock | NLD | Certifications | Album |
|---|---|---|---|---|---|---|---|---|---|---|---|---|
| "Photograph" | 1996 | 53 | — | 6 | 17 | — | — | — | 5 | — | | Villains |
| "Cup of Tea" | 1996 | — | — | — | 35 | — | — | — | — | — | | Villains |
| "The Freshmen" | 1997 | 5 | 7 | 1 | 9 | 7 | 28 | 6 | — | 71 | RIAA: Gold | Villains |
| "Villains" | 1997 | — | — | 22 | 24 | — | — | — | — | — | | Villains |
| "Hero" | 1999 | — | — | 17 | 38 | — | — | — | — | — | | The Verve Pipe |
| "Never Let You Down" | 2001 | — | 20 | — | — | — | — | — | — | — | | Underneath |
| "Crash Landing" | 2014 | — | — | — | — | — | — | — | — | — | | Overboard |
"—" denotes a release that did not chart.

== See also ==
- List of alternative rock artists
- List of artists who reached number one on the U.S. alternative rock chart
- List of post-grunge bands
- List of RCA Records artists
