= The Freshmen (song) =

1997 single by the Verve Pipe

Single by the Verve Pipe

from the album Villains
- B-side: "Ominous Man"; "Spoonful of Sugar" (live)
- Released: January 21, 1997
- Genre: Alternative rock; post-grunge
- Length: 4:30
- Label: RCA; BMG
- Songwriters: Donny Brown; Doug Corella; Jeffrey Joseph Douglas; Brad Vander Ark; Brian Vander Ark
- Producer: Jack Joseph Puig

The Verve Pipe singles chronology
"Cup of Tea" (1996)	"The Freshmen" (1997)	"Villains" (1997)

Music video
- "The Freshmen" on YouTube

"The Freshmen" is a song by American alternative rock band the Verve Pipe. Released in January 1997 as the third single from their second studio album Villains, the song became the band's breakthrough hit and is the group's highest-charting single, peaking at number five on the US Billboard Hot 100, number six in Canada, and number 28 in Australia.

== Background and content ==
In an interview with Exclusive, lead singer and songwriter Brian Vander Ark stated that the incident which inspired the song was when his pregnant girlfriend had an abortion.

In a 2018 interview with Songfacts, Vander Ark said:

It's for the most part a made-up story, which most of my songs are. These are stories that I come up with, and I do characters. Part of the story was true in the fact that I had gone out with a girl and my buddy had gone out with her after I went out with her, and then I went out with her again and then she ended up getting pregnant and having an abortion. But from there, there's poetic license that happens and makes the story more dramatic. A neophyte writer that I was, I ended up having her commit suicide, and that never happened.

Vander Ark told the Boston Globe in 2022 that he hadn't originally intended to write a song about abortion, but that once he'd keyed in on the grounding phrase—"stop a baby's breath, and a shoe full of rice"—it allowed him to tap into his ambivalence over the experience: "Growing up in a very conservative Reform Christian home, I struggled with guilt. It just felt cathartic to release the lyric into the world as a way to half-admit my participation, because I struggled to process it."

"The Freshmen" was one of several songs about abortion that were released by male musicians in the 1990s. Referring to RCA Records' 1999 decision to cancel the U.S. release of the Swedish singer Robyn's album My Truth, which included songs about her 1998 abortion, Vander Ark said, "RCA did not put up any roadblocks, never talked to us about changing a lyric, never seemed to even care. And I've always felt like 'The Freshmen' was pretty obviously about abortion. Look, I'd bet that it had to do with me being male and her running afoul of a certain code of femininity. It's sad, too, especially on an album called My Truth, when you have this gutsy openness, to then get silenced by male gatekeepers in the industry."

== Versions ==
The song first appeared, in acoustic style, on the Verve Pipe's 1992 album I've Suffered a Head Injury. It was recorded a second time and released on the band's 1996 album, Villains. Later that year, the band recorded the song again, this time with the producer Jack Joseph Puig, for release as a single in January 1997. Subsequent pressings of Villains replaced the original album version with the single version.

In addition, a slightly modified single version was released to radio, with Vander Ark singing the final lyrics of the second verse ("thinks about her now and how he never really wept") in the same melodic sequence as he sings the homologous lyrics at the end of the first verse ("stop a baby's breath..."), as opposed to his higher-pitched, almost yelled rendering of these lyrics in the version that appeared on the album.

== Music video ==
The music video for "The Freshmen" was released in 1997 and was directed by Mark Neale.

== Track listings ==
US CD single

1. "The Freshmen" (album mix) – 4:29
2. "The Freshmen" (pop mix) – 4:29
3. "The Freshmen" (Studio D version) – 5:06
4. "Ominous Man" (album version) – 4:20
5. "Spoonful of Sugar" (live) – 4:53

US cassette single

A. "The Freshmen" (album mix) – 4:29
B. "The Freshmen" (pop mix) – 4:29

European and Australian CD single

1. "The Freshmen" (mix one) – 4:29
2. "The Freshmen" (mix two) – 4:29
3. "Ominous Man" (album version) – 4:20
4. "Spoonful of Sugar" (live) – 4:53

== Credits and personnel ==
Credits are taken from the US CD single liner notes.

Studios

- Produced and mixed at Oceanway Studios (Hollywood, California)
- Mastered at Sterling Sound (New York City)

Personnel

- Brian Vander Ark – writing, lead vocals, guitar
- A.J. Dunning – guitars, background vocals
- Brad Vander Ark – bass, background vocals
- Doug Corella – keyboards, percussion
- Donny Brown – drums, background vocals
- Jack Joseph Puig – production, mixing
- Ted Jensen – mastering

== Charts ==
=== Weekly charts ===
Chart (1997)	Peak position
Australia (ARIA)	28
Canada Top Singles (RPM)	6
Canada Adult Contemporary (RPM)	27
Netherlands (Dutch Top 40 Tipparade)	20
Netherlands (Single Top 100)	71
US Billboard Hot 100	5
US Adult Top 40 (Billboard)	7
US Mainstream Rock Tracks (Billboard)	9
US Modern Rock Tracks (Billboard)	1
US Top 40/Mainstream (Billboard)	7
US Triple-A (Billboard)	1

=== Year-end charts ===
Chart (1997)	Position
Canada Top Singles (RPM)	48
US Billboard Hot 100	21
US Adult Top 40 (Billboard)	15
US Mainstream Rock Tracks (Billboard)	24
US Modern Rock Tracks (Billboard)	8
US Top 40/Mainstream (Billboard)	26
US Triple-A (Billboard)	9

== Certifications ==
Region	Certification	Certified units/sales
New Zealand (RMNZ)	Platinum	30,000^{‡}
United States (RIAA)	Gold	600,000
^{‡} Sales+streaming figures based on certification alone.

== Release history ==
Region	Date	Format(s)	Label(s)	Ref.
United States	January 21, 1997	Rock radio	RCA; BMG	
United States	March 4, 1997	Contemporary hit radio	RCA; BMG	

== Cover versions ==
- In 1998, Mustard Plug released a ska version of the song as the B-side of their single You.
- In 2004, Skott Freedman released a piano version of the song on his album Judge a Book.
- In 2005, the then-Boston Red Sox pitcher Bronson Arroyo covered the song on his first covers album, Covering the Bases.
- In 2010, Jay Brannan released a soft indie version of the song as a single, "The Freshmen".
- In 2010, Brothers released a melodic hardcore punk version of the song as a bonus track on their EP When I Was Young.

== See also ==
- List of Billboard number-one alternative singles of 1997
