= Villains (The Verve Pipe album) =

Studio album by the Verve Pipe
- Released: March 26, 1996
- Studio: Studio D and The Plant, Sausalito, Ocean Way Recording, Hollywood
- Genre: Alternative rock, post-grunge
- Length: 53:40, 54:23 (Original)
- Label: RCA
- Producer: Jerry Harrison

The Verve Pipe chronology
| Pop Smear (1993) | Villains (1996) | The Verve Pipe (1999) |

Singles from Villains
- 1. "Photograph" Released: February 1996; 2. "Cup Of Tea" Released: July 16, 1996; 3. "The Freshmen" Released: January 21, 1997; 4. "Villains" Released: 1997

Professional ratings
Review scores
| Source | Rating |
|---|---|
| Allmusic | 4/5 stars |
| Robert Christgau | (C) |

Villains is the third album and first major label release by American rock band the Verve Pipe, released in March 1996. The album contained the band's first hit single, "Photograph", which peaked in the top 10 on the Billboard Modern Rock Tracks. A year after the release of the album, a reformatted version of "The Freshmen" peaked at number 1 on the Modern Rock Tracks chart. The single was also the band's sole appearance in the top 40 of the Billboard Hot 100, where it peaked at number 5. The success of the song helped this album go Platinum. Villains is the Verve Pipe's best-selling album. The album originally included a slower recording of "The Freshmen," before it was replaced in subsequent pressings with a faster rerecorded version.

== Track listing ==
All tracks are written by Brian Vander Ark, except where noted.

Tracks
| No. | Title | Length |
|---|---|---|
| 1. | "Barely (If at All)" | 3:45 |
| 2. | "Drive You Mild" | 3:02 |
| 3. | "Villains" | 4:42 |
| 4. | "Reverend Girl" | 4:27 |
| 5. | "Cup of Tea" | 4:26 |
| 6. | "Myself" | 4:47 |
| 7. | "The Freshmen (Original pressings included the slower version which is 5:08)" | 4:29 |
| 8. | "Photograph" | 4:55 |
| 9. | "Ominous Man" | 4:20 |
| 10. | "Real" | 1:51 |
| 11. | "Penny Is Poison" (A.J. Dunning, Brian Vander Ark) | 3:30 |
| 12. | "Cattle" | 3:42 |
| 13. | "Veneer" | 5:32 |
| Total length: | | 53:40 |

== Personnel ==
Adapted from the Villains booklet and liner notes.

The Verve Pipe

- Brian Vander Ark – Lead vocals, rhythm guitar
- Brad Vander Ark – Bass guitar, backing vocals
- Donny Brown – Drums, backing vocals
- A.J. Dunning – Lead guitar, backing vocals
- Doug Corella – Keyboards, percussion

Artwork

- Sean Mosher-Smith – Art direction, design
- Aldo Mauro – Band photography
- Slow HEARTH – Bird photography

Management

- Doug Buttleman – Management for The Fitzgerald Hartley Company
- Fred Bohlander – Booking for Monterey Peninsula Artists
- Howard B. Abrams – Legal

Production

- Jerry Harrison – Producer
- Brian Malouf – A&R
- Jason Rio, Philip "Mac" Ward – Coordinators
- Douglas Biro and Ria Lewerke – Creative directors
- Karl Derfler – Engineer
- Doug McKean – Additional editing
- Larry "Hot" Brewer – Additional engineering
- Chris Buttleman – Guitar technician
- Ted Jensen – Mastering at Sterling Sound, New York, NY
- Tom Lord-Alge – Mixing
- Alvaro Alencar & Mauricio Iragorri – Assistant mixing

== Charts ==
=== Weekly charts ===
Chart performance for Villians
| Chart (1996–1997) | Peak position |
|---|---|
| New Zealand Albums (RMNZ) | 28 |
| US Billboard 200 | 24 |
| US Heatseekers Albums (Billboard) | 1 |

=== Year-end charts ===
| Chart (1997) | Position |
|---|---|
| US Billboard 200 | 69 |

=== Singles ===
| Year | Single | Chart | Position |
|---|---|---|---|
| 1996 | Photograph | US Mainstream Rock Tracks | 15 |
| 1996 | Photograph | US Modern Rock Tracks | 6 |
| 1996 | Cup Of Tea | US Mainstream Rock Tracks | 35 |
| 1997 | "The Freshmen" | US Mainstream Rock Tracks | 9 |
| 1997 | "The Freshmen" | US Modern Rock Tracks | 1 |
| 1997 | "The Freshmen" | US Billboard Hot 100 | 5 |
| 1997 | "The Freshmen" | US Adult Top 40 | 7 |
| 1997 | "The Freshmen" | US Top 40 Mainstream | 7 |
| 1997 | "Villains" | US Mainstream Rock Tracks | 24 |
| 1997 | "Villains" | US Modern Rock Tracks | 22 |

== Certifications ==
| Region | Certification | Certified units/sales |
|---|---|---|
| United States (RIAA) | Platinum | 1,000,000^{^} |
^{^} Shipments figures based on certification alone.
