= Miljenko Matijevic =

Croatian-American singer (born 1964)

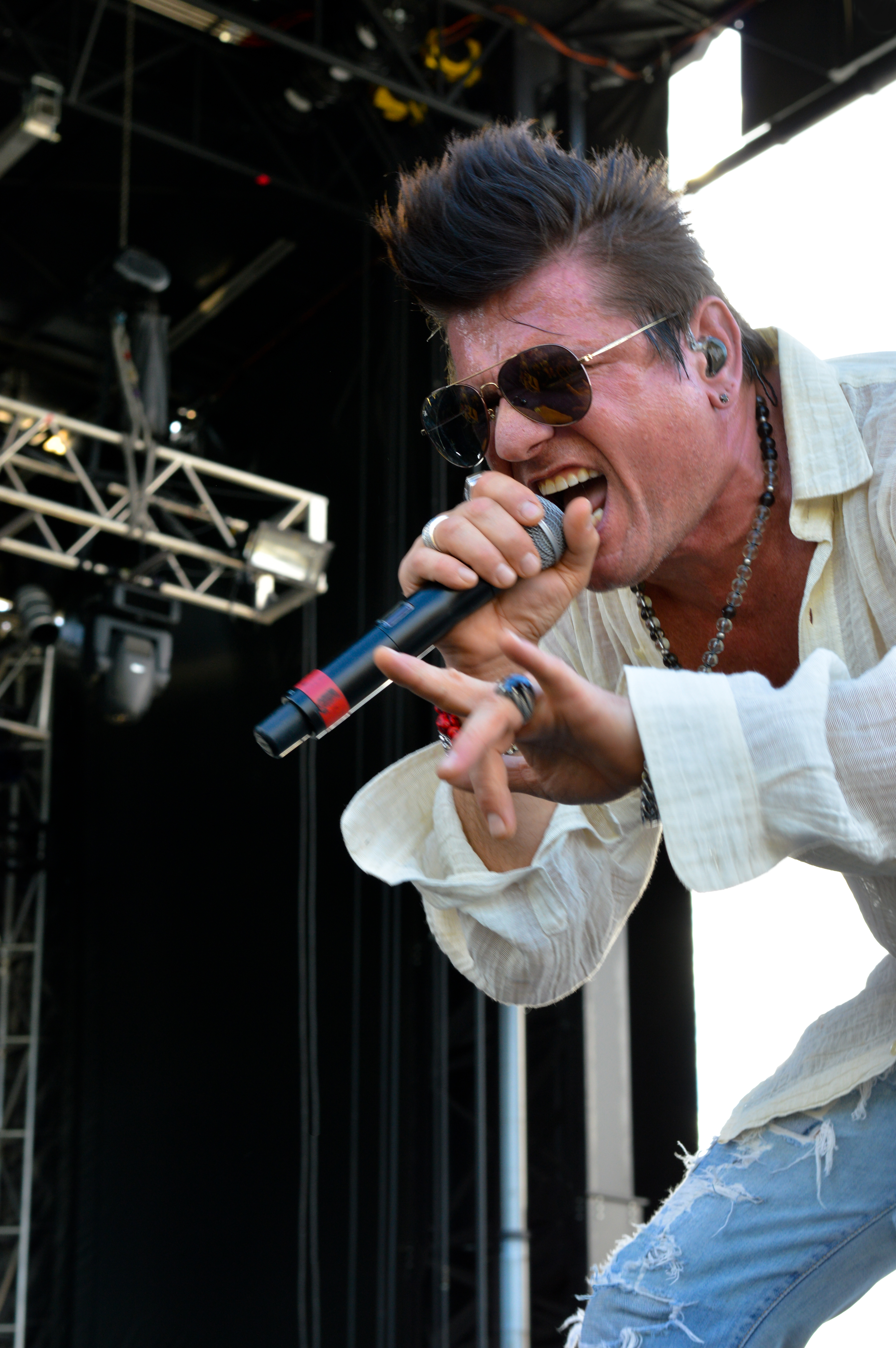
- Matijevic performing with Steelheart in 2017

Background information
- Also known as: Michael, Mike, Mili
- Born: November 30, 1964 (age 61); Zagreb, SR Croatia, Yugoslavia
- Genres: Heavy metal; hard rock; glam metal; pop rock; new wave; soft rock
- Occupations: Singer; songwriter
- Years active: 1989–present
- Labels: MCA; MCM/Steelheart; Bad Boss Company
- Member of: Steelheart
- Formerly of: Manzarek–Krieger
- Website: steelheart.com

Miljenko Matijevic (born November 30, 1964) is a Croatian-American singer, best known as the lead vocalist and songwriter of the hard rock band Steelheart. He has a big following in South Korea and has worked on several South Korean TV series. He has also released several soundtracks for South Korean TV series. In 2010, he did a tour with Ray Manzarek and Robby Krieger of rock band the Doors, singing the parts of Jim Morrison.

== Early life ==
Matijevic was born on November 30, 1964, in Zagreb. He lived there with his brother and grandparents until 1970 when his parents collected him from Croatia and moved with him and his brother to Scarsdale, New York. When Matijevic was 7, the family moved to Greenwich, Connecticut. Michael's brother, John, learned to play the guitar and Michael would often sing along, particularly country music, as that is what their father enjoyed. When Michael was 9 he joined the local church choir. However, the biggest change was when Michael was 11 and discovered Led Zeppelin.

== Career ==
After being seen playing at a local club in the band the Mission, Don Stroh, owner of Showcase Studios, called Matijevic saying he should come in and rehearse with a band in his studio. This is where Matijevic first met Chris Risola and James Ward, along with Jack Wilkinson, and Red Alert was formed.

Jack Wilkinson was eventually replaced and two former members of the band Rage of Angels who played on their 1989 debut album joined: John Fowler (1966–2008) on drums and Frank DiConstanzo as a rhythm guitarist. Michael soon devoted all attention to the band, and not his college work. He, John and James left for Los Angeles in the hope of getting a record deal, despite having no contacts. However, within a month, the band had a record deal.

Their first album, Steelheart, released in 1990, sold over a million copies and was supported by a world tour. The follow-up, Tangled in Reins, released in 1992, was supported by a tour in Europe and Asia.

At the end of their U.S. tour in 1992 opening for Great White, Steelheart was invited to open an additional show for the band Slaughter. On Halloween night, at the McNichols Arena in Denver, Colorado, Steelheart was performing "Dancing in the Fire" from the Tangled in Reins album when Matijevic was involved in a serious accident. Matijevic decided to climb a lighting truss which was for some reason improperly secured. He failed to climb the rig and failed to dodge the 1000 pound piece of equipment, which hit him in the back of the head, driving him face first into the stage. The outcome of the accident was a broken nose, cheekbone, jaw, twisted spine, and severe memory loss. Matijevic found the strength to walk off the stage and was immediately taken to the hospital. The incident marked the end of the original lineup of Steelheart.

Steelheart reformed with a new lineup and released the album, Wait, in 1996. The band released the album Good 2B Alive in 2008. In 2010, Michael did a tour with Ray Manzarek and Robby Krieger of rock band the Doors, singing the parts of Jim Morrison.

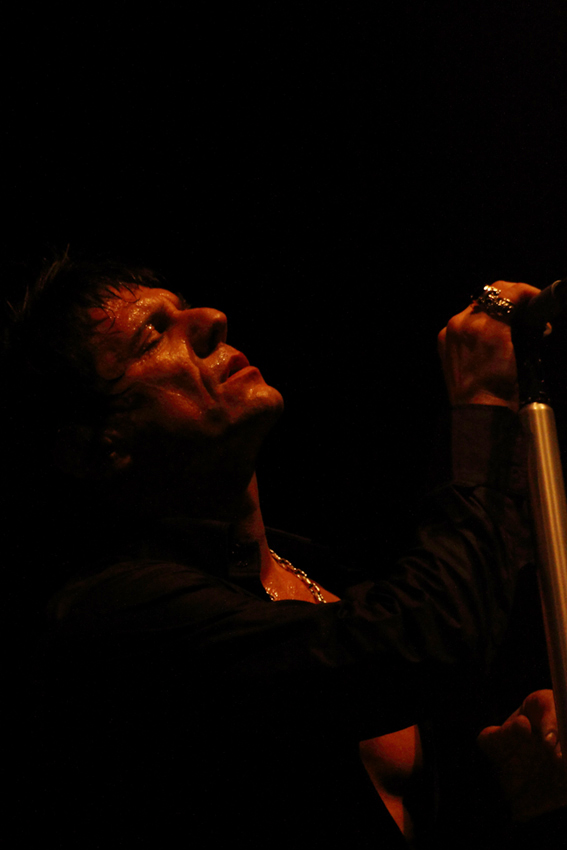
Matijevic with the Doors at the Bospop festival, Weert, Netherlands, 2010

Steelheart released the album, Through Worlds of Stardust, in 2017 and the live album, Rock'n Milan, in 2018.

== Discography ==
=== South Korean singles ===
Year	Title	Album
2015	"Stay"	My Beautiful Bride OST – Part.2
2016	"My Love Is Gone"	Glamorous Temptation OST – Part.9
2016	"The Story of the Rain and You"	King of Mask Singer Episode 48
2016	"Confession"	King of Mask Singer Episode 48
2016	"I Miss You to Death"	Non-album single

== Filmography ==
=== Television series ===
Year	Title	Role	Network
2016	King of Mask Singer	Himself (A Quiet Sort Of Lightning Man) Episode 47 - 48	MBC
2016	Flaming Youth	himself	SBS
2016	The God of Music	himself	Mnet
2016	My Neighbor, Charles	himself	KBS1

=== Film appearance ===
Year	Title	Role	Released by
2001	Rock Star	singing voice of Mark Wahlberg's character Chris (Izzy) Cole	Warner Bros.
