= Brian Vander Ark =

American musician

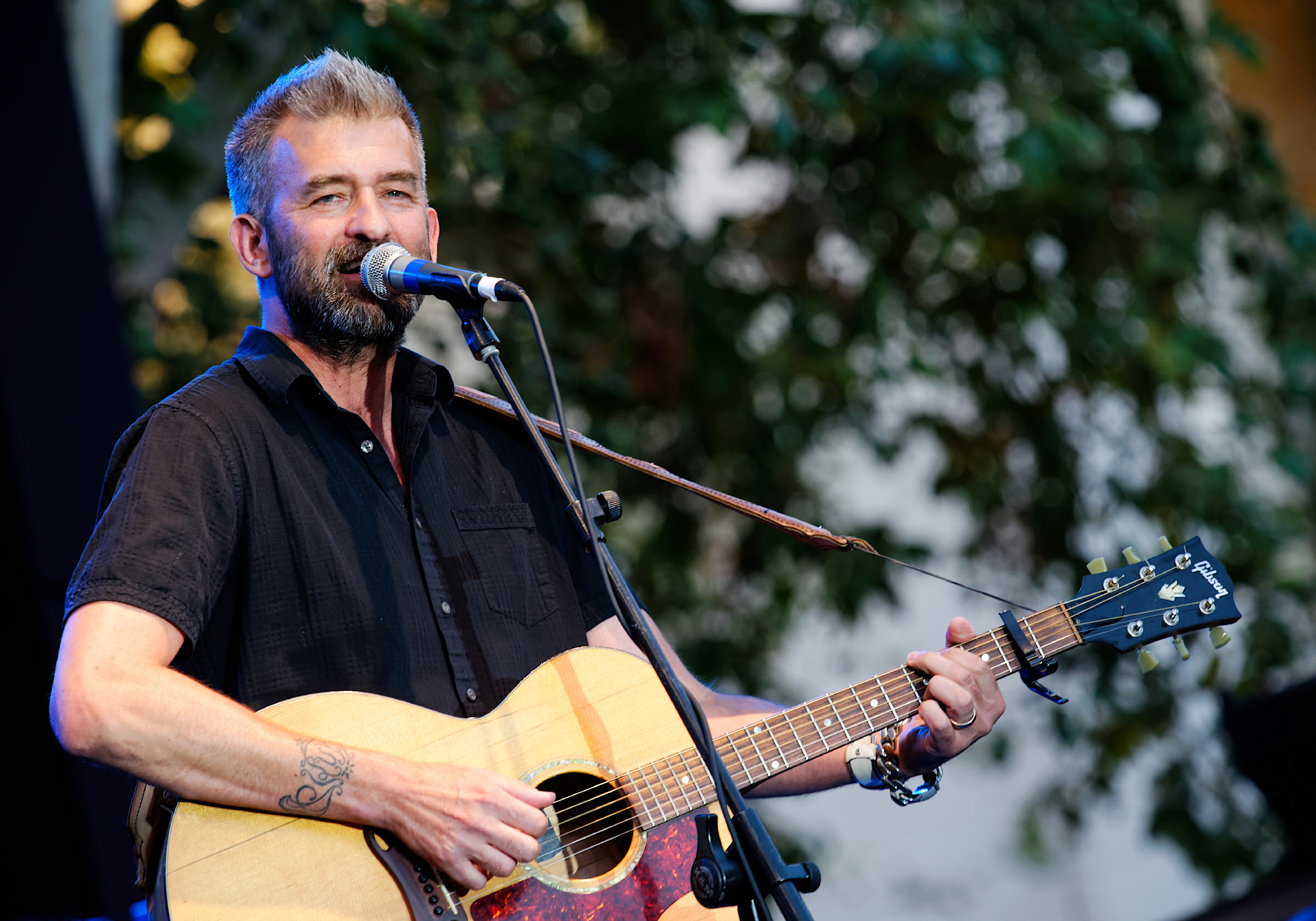
- Brian Vander Ark performing in 2016

Background information
- Origin: Grand Rapids, Michigan, U.S.
- Occupations: Musician; songwriter
- Member of: The Verve Pipe
- Website: brianvanderark.com

Brian Vander Ark is an American singer-songwriter best known as the lead singer for the American rock band the Verve Pipe.

== Music ==
Brian Vander Ark joined the band His Boy Elroy as a guitarist. He eventually quit and started the band Johnny with an Eye with his brother, Brad Vander Ark. In 1992, he disbanded Johnny with an Eye to form the Verve Pipe with Brad, drummer Donny Brown and guitarist Brian Stout. The band recorded two independent albums I've Suffered A Head Injury and Pop Smear.

The Verve Pipe's major label debut, Villains, featured the Vander Ark-penned single "The Freshmen", the group's highest-charting single and one of the most successful multi-format tracks of 1997. "Never Let You Down," the lead single from the band's 2001 album, Underneath, was one of the Top 50 Most Played songs for Adult Top 40 and Modern A/C radio in 2001.

Brian Vander Ark released his first solo album, Resurrection, in May 2003. He toured extensively in support of the album, including a double-bill acoustic tour with Butch Walker. Vander Ark's second solo release, Angel, Put Your Face On, was released in May 2006, followed by a self-titled third record in January 2008, produced by Bill Szymczyk. Bill Szymczyk then produced Brian's followup, Magazine, in 2011.

In 2016, Brian released an album of story songs with actor/songwriter Jeff Daniels.

== Acting ==
Vander Ark acted in the film Rock Star in 2001. Vander Ark played bassist Ricki Bell, of the fictional band Blood Pollution. The film also featured performances by Zakk Wylde, Jason Bonham, Myles Kennedy, Blas Elias and Nick Catanese. Vander Ark wrote the song "Colorful", which appears at the end of the film, sung by the Chris Cole Band, and simulated by Mark Wahlberg. Vander Ark recorded vocals of this song on the film's soundtrack. The song is on album Underneath. He has also appeared in several independent films, including director Matthew Leutwyler's Road Kill, Dead and Breakfast, and Unearthed. Vander Ark also composed the musical scores for Dead & Breakfast and Unearthed.

=== Filmography ===
- Road Kill – Joey (1999)
- This Space Between Us – Tagger (1999)
- Mergers & Acquisitions – Larry (2001)
- Rock Star – Ricki Bell, Blood Pollution Bassist (2001)
- Dead & Breakfast – The Tall Hick (2004)
- Bullies on Vacation (short) – Steve Vanderlaan (2010)
- House of the Rising Sun – Detective Jimmy LaGrange (2011)
- Eden Shattered (short) – President Dave Pellaton (2011)

== Discography ==
=== Albums ===
- Resurrection (2004)
- Angel, Put Your Face On (2006)
- Brian Vander Ark (2008)
- Magazine (2011)
- Wonderland with Lux Land (2011)
- Simple Truths with Jeff Daniels (2016)
- Planet Sunday Sessions Vol. I (2016)
- Planet Sunday Sessions Vol. II (2021)

=== Live Releases ===
- Within Reach (2005)
- Live at Schubas (2005)
- Live At Eddie's Attic (2006)
- Bootleg: Lawn Chairs And Living Rooms (2007)
- Night One: Resurrection (2009)
- Night Two: Angel, Put Your Face On (2009)
- Night Three: Self Titled (2009)
- My Little Town- Live In Grand Rapids (2011)

=== Singles ===
- "This Time" (2009)
- "Daddy's Girl" (2012)
- "Another American Down" with Jeff Daniels (2016)

=== DVD Releases ===
- Live at Aquinas College (2008)
- Lawn Chairs and Living Rooms (2012)
