= Zakk Wylde discography =

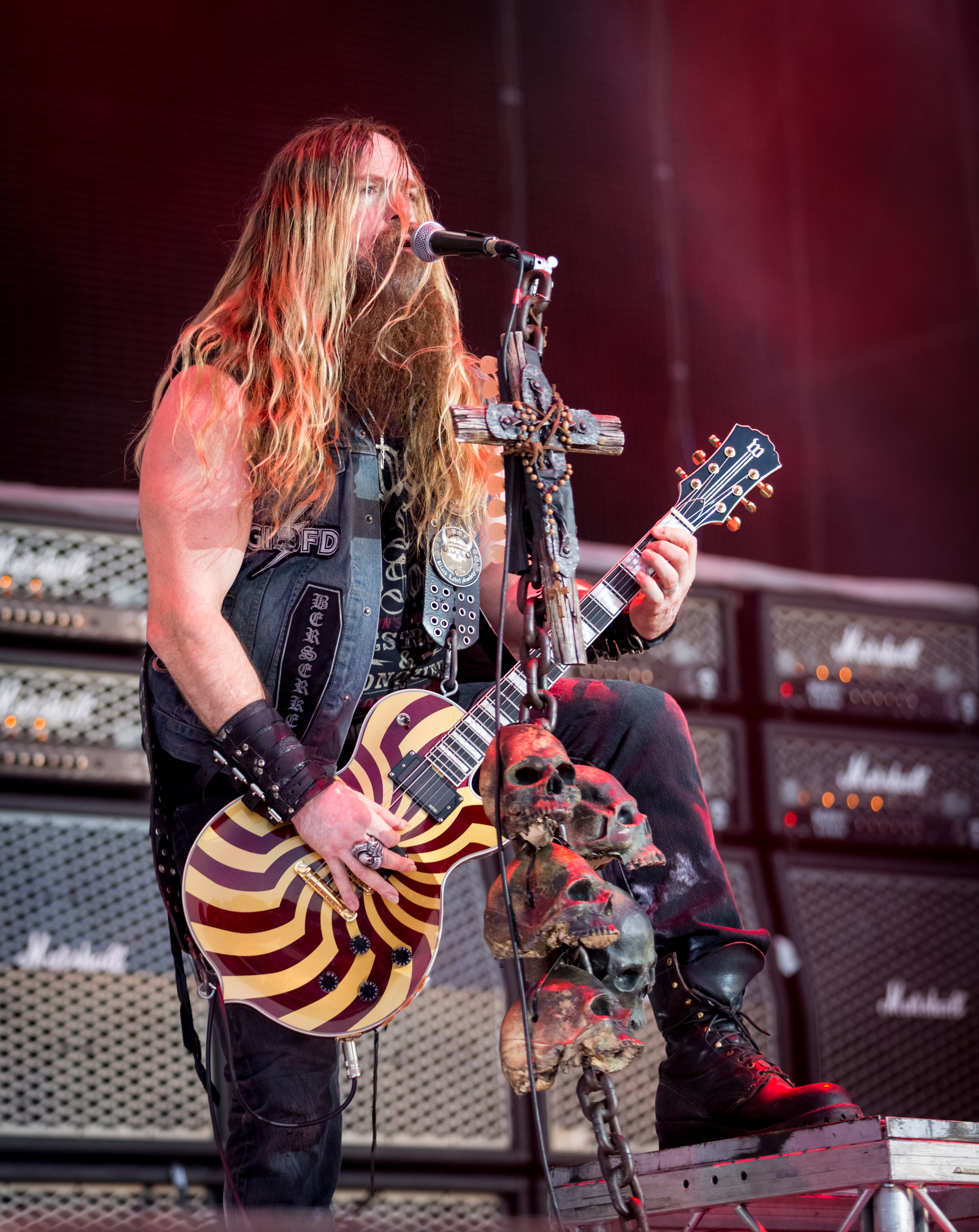
Wylde performing in 2015

The following are albums and appearances by American musician Zakk Wylde, guitarist for Ozzy Osbourne, lead vocalist and guitarist of Black Label Society, and lead guitarist and vocalist in Pride & Glory. He has also released two solo albums, Book of Shadows in 1996 and Book of Shadows II in 2016.

== Solo albums ==
| Title | Album details | Peak chart positions | | Sales |
| Title | Album details | US | JPN | Sales |
|---|---|---|---|---|
| Book of Shadows | Released: June 18, 1996; Label: Geffen Records; Formats: CD, CS | — | 32 | US: 2,434+ |
| Book of Shadows II | Released: April 8, 2016; Label: Entertainment One Music; Formats: CD, CS, digital download | 18 | — | |
"—" denotes a recording that did not chart or was not released in that territory.

== Singles ==
| Title | Year | Peak chart positions | Album |
| Title | Year | US Main. | Album |
|---|---|---|---|
| "Between Heaven and Hell" | 1996 | 28 | Book of Shadows |
| "Sleeping Dogs" (Featuring Corey Taylor) | 2016 | 16 | Book of Shadows II |
"—" denotes a recording that did not chart or was not released in that territory.

=== As featured artist ===
| Title | Year | Peak chart positions | | | | | Certifications | Album |
| Title | Year | US | US Main. | US Rock | US Alt. | CAN | Certifications | Album |
|---|---|---|---|---|---|---|---|---|
| "Porn Star Dancing" (My Darkest Days featuring Chad Kroeger and Zakk Wylde) | 2010 | 90 | 1 | 7 | 21 | 40 | CAN: Platinum; US: Gold | My Darkest Days |
| "The Fearless Must Endure" (Jamey Jasta featuring Zakk Wylde) | 2011 | — | — | — | — | — | | Jasta |
"—" denotes a recording that did not chart or was not released in that territory.

== Instructional works ==
=== Albums and books ===
| Title | Details |
|---|---|
| The Best of Zakk Wylde (Play-It-Like-It-Is) | Released: March 1, 2001; Label (Publisher): Cherry Lane Music (ISBN 9781575603360); Formats: CD+Book |
| Zakk Wylde Anthology (Play It Like It Is Guitar) | Released: August 22, 2012; Label (Publisher): Cherry Lane Music (ISBN 9781603783934); Formats: Book |
| Zakk Wylde – Guitar Play-Along Volume 150 | Released: September 10, 2012; Label (Publisher): Cherry Lane Music (ISBN 9781603783941); Formats: CD+Book |

=== Videos ===
| Title | Video details |
|---|---|
| Zakk Wylde: Guitar Apprentice | Released: November 19, 2012; Label: Legacy Learning; Formats: DVD |

== With Ozzy Osbourne ==
| Year | Album | Notes | Ref. |
|---|---|---|---|
| 1988 | No Rest For The Wicked | guitars | |
| 1990 | Just Say Ozzy | guitars | |
| 1991 | No More Tears | guitars | |
| 1993 | Live & Loud | guitars, piano on "Changes" | |
| 1995 | Ozzmosis | guitars | |
| 2001 | Down to Earth | guitars | |
| 2002 | Live At Budokan | guitars | |
| 2007 | Black Rain | guitars, keyboards, backing vocals | |

== With Zakk Sabbath ==
| Year | Album | Notes | Ref. |
|---|---|---|---|
| 2016 | Live in Detroit | guitars, lead vocals | |
| 2020 | Vertigo | guitars, lead vocals | |
| 2024 | Doomed Forever Forever Doomed | guitars, lead vocals | |

== Guest appearances ==
| Year | Song(s) | Album | Ref. |
|---|---|---|---|
| 1990 | "Pink Clouds an Island" | Ward One: Along the Way – Bill Ward | |
| 1991 | "Helpless" and "Stayin' Alive" | Confessions – Dweezil Zappa | |
| 1991 | "Six Guns Loaded" | Bite Down Hard – Britny Fox | |
| 1992 | "Back in Black" and "I Wish" | Coven • Pitrelli • Reilly – CPR | |
| 1993 | "Teenage Love Affair" and "Dodo" | The Electric Pow Wow – Stevie Salas | |
| 1994 | "After The Reign" | After the Reign – Blackfoot | |
| 1997 | "君だけの (Tomorrow)" | Hard Pressed – Nobuteru Maeda | |
| 1997 | "Love & Love (Instrumental)" | Love/ Sun Child – Tokma | |
| 2001 | "Frakenstein", "Evel Kneivel" and "What a Shame" | Inertia – Derek Sherinian | |
| 2003 | "Nightmare Cinema", "Axis of Evil" and "Black Utopia" | Black Utopia – Derek Sherinian | |
| 2003 | | Unleashed, Uncensored, Unknown - Fozzy | |
| 2004 | "Day of the Dead", "God of War" and "The River Song" | Mythology – Derek Sherinian | |
| 2004 | "Reborn" and "Soul Bleed" | New Found Power – Damageplan | |
| 2005 | "Wanderlust" | All That Remains – Fozzy | |
| 2005 | | The Art of Touring – Shadows Fall | |
| 2006 | "Man with No Name", "Blood of the Snake" and "The Monsoon" | Blood of the Snake – Derek Sherinian | |
| 2006 | "Man with No Name (Radio Edit)" | In the Summertime (Single) - Derek Sherinian | |
| 2006 | "Code 19" | Ultimate Guitar Zeus – Carmine Appice Project | |
| 2009 | "Molecular Heinosity", "So Far Gone" and "Wings of Insanity" | Molecular Heinosity – Derek Sherinian | |
| 2009 | "Addiction" | No Regrets – Dope | |
| 2010 | "Porn Star Dancing" (feat. Chad Kroeger) | My Darkest Days – My Darkest Days | |
| 2011 | "Unholy" | Rebels – Black Veil Brides | |
| 2011 | "The Fearless Must Endure" | Jasta – Jamey Jasta | |
| 2011 | "Nothing's Changed" and "The Party's Over" | Unusual Suspects – Leslie West | |
| 2011 | "Iron Man" | Seeking Major Tom – William Shatner | |
| 2012 | "Monument / Monolith" | Built to Last – The Rippingtons | |
| 2013 | "No Way Out" | Revolution Rise – Kill Devil Hill | |
| 2014 | "Steep Climb" | Good for Sumthin – Eric Gales | |
| 2019 | "Turn You Down" | Hixtape, Vol. 1 – Hardy | |
| 2020 | "The Phoenix" | The Phoenix – Derek Sherinian | |
| 2022 | Die Kobra | Vortex – Derek Sherinian | |
| 2022 | "Parasite", "Mr. Darkness", "Nothing Feels Right" and "Evil Shuffle" | Patient Number 9 – Ozzy Osbourne | |
| 2024 | Some Assembly Required | Some Assembly Required - Jason Becker | |

=== Music videos ===
| Year | Title | Directed | Album | Ref. |
|---|---|---|---|---|
| 2010 | "Porn Star Dancing" (My Darkest Days featuring Chad Kroeger, Ludacris and Zakk Wylde) | Brendon Kyle Cochrane | My Darkest Days | |

== Other appearances ==
| Year | Song(s) | Album | Ref. |
|---|---|---|---|
| 1991 | "Farm Fiddlin'" | Guitars that Rule the World | |
| 1992 | "Baby Please Don't Go" | L. A. Blues Authority | |
| 1996 | "Hell Ain't a Bad Place to Be'" | Thunderbolt – A Tribute To AC/DC | |
| 1997 | "Black Dog", "Stairway to Heaven", "Going to California", "Good Times Bad Times" and "Kashmir" | Stairway to Heaven: A Tribute to Led Zeppelin | |
| 1998 | "White Christmas" | Merry Axemas Vol.2 – More Guitars | |
| 1999 | "Go to Hell" | Humanary Stew – A Tribute To Alice Cooper | |
| 2001 | "Livin' the Life", "We All Die Young", "Blood Pollution", "Stand Up", "Wasted Generation" and "Long Live Rock 'n' Roll" | Rock Star Soundtrack | |
| 2009 | "Suicide Note Part 1" | Getcha Pull! (A Tribute To Dimebag Darrell) | |
