= Unblackened =

2013 live album by Black Label Society

Live album with studio tracks by Black Label Society
- Released: September 24, 2013
- Recorded: Club Nokia, Los Angeles, March 2013
- Genre: Acoustic rock, Southern rock
- Length: 124:29
- Label: eOne
- Producer: Zakk Wylde

Black Label Society chronology
The Song Remains Not the Same (2011)	Unblackened (2013)	Catacombs of the Black Vatican (2014)

Singles from Unblackened
- 1. "Ain't No Sunshine When She's Gone" Released: August 9, 2013

Professional ratings
Review scores
Source	Rating
AllMusic	3/5 stars
Metal Discovery	8.5/10

Unblackened is the second live album by American heavy metal band Black Label Society. It was recorded live on March 6, 2013, at Club Nokia in Los Angeles, and released on September 24, 2013.

Disc 1 consists of live tracks and disc 2 also consists of live tracks among six newly recorded songs, three of which are re-recordings of previously released songs from the band's studio albums.

The album was announced back in 2012, but the release was delayed due to the postponement of the show, which was settled to be recorded in August. Black Label Society started the pre-ordering of the album in August 2013, also offering a deluxe edition box set containing a double live CD pack, a DVD of the show, a replica of Zakk Wylde's pewter dagger necklace, a photo book with photos taken from the show, and a custom package.

On August 9, 2013, "Ain't No Sunshine When She's Gone" was released as a single through iTunes in North America.

== Track listing ==
All tracks are written by Zakk Wylde, except where noted.

Disc one
No.	Title	Length
1.	"Losin' Your Mind"	5:47
2.	"The Blessed Hellride"	4:22
3.	"Sold My Soul"	7:35
4.	"Road Back Home"	6:09
5.	"Spoke in the Wheel"	5:16
6.	"House of Doom"	4:21
7.	"Queen of Sorrow"	3:47
8.	"Machine Gun Man"	4:51
9.	"Sweet Jesus"	4:38
10.	"In This River"	6:41
11.	"Throwin' It All Away"	11:06
Total length:		64:33

Disc two
No.	Title	Length
1.	"Takillya (Estyabon)"	1:38
2.	"Won't Find It Here"	8:47
3.	"Rust"	5:26
4.	"Speedball"	1:04
5.	"I Thank You Child"	5:01
6.	"Stillborn"	8:24
7.	"Ain't No Sunshine" (Bill Withers)	3:31
8.	"Lovin' Woman (Bonus Version)"	5:04
9.	"Queen of Sorrow" (Unblackened recorded studio version)	4:14
10.	"Song for You (Bonus Version)" (Leon Russell)	5:07
11.	"Won't Find It Here" (Unblackened recorded studio version)	6:55
12.	"Yesterday, Today, Tomorrow" (Unblackened recorded studio version)	4:45
Total length:		59:56

== Personnel ==
- Zakk Wylde – vocals, guitar, piano. acoustic guitar on studio tracks
- Nick Catanese – guitar
- John DeServio – bass, additional vocals
- Derek Sherinian – piano
- Chad Szeliga – drums
- Greg Locascio – additional vocals

== Charts ==
Chart (2014)	Peak position
German Albums (Offizielle Top 100)	90
Belgian Albums (Ultratop Wallonia)	186
US Billboard 200	72
US Top Hard Rock Albums (Billboard)	6
US Independent Albums (Billboard)	14
US Top Rock Albums (Billboard)	25
