= Order of the Black =

Studio album by Black Label Society
- Released: August 10, 2010
- Genre: Heavy metal; southern metal; hard rock
- Length: 49:03
- Label: E1, Roadrunner, Riot

Black Label Society chronology
Skullage (2009)	Order of the Black (2010)	The Song Remains Not the Same (2011)

Professional ratings
Review scores
Source	Rating
AllMusic	3/5 stars
Metal.de	8/10
Rock Hard	8.5/10

Order of the Black is the eighth studio album by American heavy metal band Black Label Society. It was released in North America on August 10, 2010, through E1 Music. In New Zealand and Australia, it was released by Riot Entertainment (with special cover art) and in Europe through Roadrunner Records.

== Release ==
The first single "Parade of the Dead" was released on June 16. The second single of the album entitled "Crazy Horse" was released next day via iTunes.

On August 9, 2010, Order of the Black was premiered at Rockline Radio, hosted by Bob Coburn. The same date, the album was posted to AOL music for streaming in its entirety (minus bonus tracks). Although various versions in different territories and formats carried different bonus tracks, all available bonus tracks are actually taken from the 2011 album The Song Remains Not the Same.

On August 23, 2010, the band was scheduled to perform Order of the Black at the Orange County Choppers show.

On August 29, 2010, Black Label Society announced ringtones from their album Order of the Black.

Target released an exclusive edition of the album with a 50-minute bonus DVD for a limited time. The DVD features "Trakk by Trakk with Zakk", a song-by-song overview of the album where Zakk Wylde talks about his lyrical and musical inspiration for the songs. It will also feature a solo performance of the song "The Last Goodbye" from the 2006 Shot to Hell album and an exclusive tour of the BLS Bunker. This is the only studio album with drummer Will Hunt.

Order of the Black sold around 33,000 copies in the United States in its first week of release to enter the Billboard 200 chart at position number 4. The album also made a Top 10 debut in Canada, landing at #9 on Canadian album charts.

== Track listing ==
All tracks are written by Zakk Wylde, except bonus tracks.

No.	Title	Length
1.	"Crazy Horse"	4:04
2.	"Overlord"	6:05
3.	"Parade of the Dead"	3:36
4.	"Darkest Days"	4:17
5.	"Black Sunday"	3:23
6.	"Southern Dissolution"	4:56
7.	"Time Waits for No One"	3:36
8.	"Godspeed Hell Bound"	4:43
9.	"War of Heaven"	4:09
10.	"Shallow Grave"	3:37
11.	"Chupacabra"	0:49
12.	"Riders of the Damned"	3:23
13.	"January"	2:20
Total length:		49:03

Bonus track
No.	Title	Length
14.	"Can't Find My Way Home (Blind Faith cover)"	3:37

Best Buy exclusive tracks
No.	Title	Length
14.	"Junior's Eyes (Black Sabbath cover)"	5:24
15.	"Helpless (Crosby, Stills, Nash & Young cover)"	4:34

Amazon exclusive track
No.	Title	Length
14.	"Bridge over Troubled Water (Simon & Garfunkel cover)"	3:37

== Personnel ==
Black Label Society

- Zakk Wylde – guitars, lead vocals, piano
- John DeServio – bass, backing vocals
- Will Hunt – drums

Production

- Produced by Zakk Wylde
- Associate producer – John DeServio
- Engineered by Adam Klumpp
- Mixed by Zakk Wylde, John DeServio, Adam Klumpp
- Mastered by George Marino
- Management – Bob Ringe (Survival Management)
- Publicity – Carise Yatter (Hired Gun Media), Darren Edwards
- Marketing, Internet – Jim Baltutis (Concepts in Concert), Denner Vieira, Angela McGill
- Artwork, layout, and design – John Irwin (John Irwin Design), Zakk Wylde

== Charts ==
Chart performance for Order of the Black
Chart (2010)	Peak position
Australian Albums (ARIA)	44
Austrian Albums (Ö3 Austria)	67
German Albums (Offizielle Top 100)	31
Finnish Albums (Suomen virallinen lista)	13
French Albums (SNEP)	112
Italian Albums (FIMI)	60
Dutch Albums (Album Top 100)	82
Swedish Albums (Sverigetopplistan)	27
Swiss Albums (Schweizer Hitparade)	45
US Billboard 200	4
US Independent Albums (Billboard)	2
US Top Hard Rock Albums (Billboard)	1
