= The Song Remains Not the Same =

Compilation album by Black Label Society
- Released: May 10, 2011
- Genre: Acoustic rock, southern rock
- Length: 41:12
- Label: eOne Music
- Producer: John DeServio, Zakk Wylde

Black Label Society chronology
| Order of the Black (2010) | The Song Remains Not the Same (2011) | Unblackened (2013) |

Professional ratings
Review scores
| Source | Rating |
|---|---|
| AllMusic | 3/5 stars |
| Consequence of Sound | C+ |

The Song Remains Not the Same is the fourth compilation album by American heavy metal band Black Label Society, released on May 10, 2011. It features new cover songs, acoustic versions of songs originally released on Order of the Black, and compiles bonus tracks from various releases of that album. The Song Remains Not the Same reached No. 41 on the Billboard 200 albums chart.

The whole album was available live streaming on May 9, 2011, via AOL Music.

== Track listing ==
All tracks are written by Zakk Wylde, except where noted.

| No. | Title | Writer(s) | Length |
|---|---|---|---|
| 1. | "Overlord" | | 5:06 |
| 2. | "Parade of the Dead" | | 3:55 |
| 3. | "Riders of the Damned" | | 3:46 |
| 4. | "Darkest Days" | | 4:05 |
| 5. | "Junior's Eyes" (Black Sabbath cover) | Geezer Butler, Tony Iommi, Ozzy Osbourne, Bill Ward | 5:26 |
| 6. | "Helpless" (Crosby, Stills, Nash & Young cover) | Neil Young | 4:36 |
| 7. | "Bridge Over Troubled Water" (Simon & Garfunkel cover) | Paul Simon | 3:42 |
| 8. | "Can't Find My Way Home" (Blind Faith cover) | Steve Winwood | 3:38 |
| 9. | "Darkest Days" (John Rich album version) | | 4:04 |
| 10. | "The First Noel" | | 2:54 |
| Total length: | | | 41:12 |

== Personnel ==
Black Label Society

- Zakk Wylde – vocals, guitars, piano
- John DeServio – bass, backing vocals
- Will Hunt – drums
- John Rich – guest vocals on track 9

Production

- Produced by Zakk Wylde
- Associate producer – John DeServio
- Engineered by Adam Klumpp
- Mixed by Zakk Wylde, John DeServio, Adam Klumpp
- Mastered by George Marino
- Management – Bob Ringe (Survival Management)
- Publicity – Carise Yatter (Hired Gun Media), Darren Edwards
- Marketing, Internet – Jim Baltutis (Concepts in Concert), Denner Vieira, Angela McGill
- Artwork, layout, and design – John Irwin (John Irwin Design), Zakk Wylde

== Charts ==
Chart performance for The Song Remains Not the Same
| Chart (2011) | Peak position |
|---|---|
| Canadian Albums (Nielsen SoundScan) | 35 |
| US Billboard 200 | 41 |
| US Independent Albums (Billboard) | 6 |
| US Top Hard Rock Albums (Billboard) | 2 |
| US Top Rock Albums (Billboard) | 11 |
| US Top Tastemaker Albums (Billboard) | 21 |
