= Nick Catanese =

American guitarist

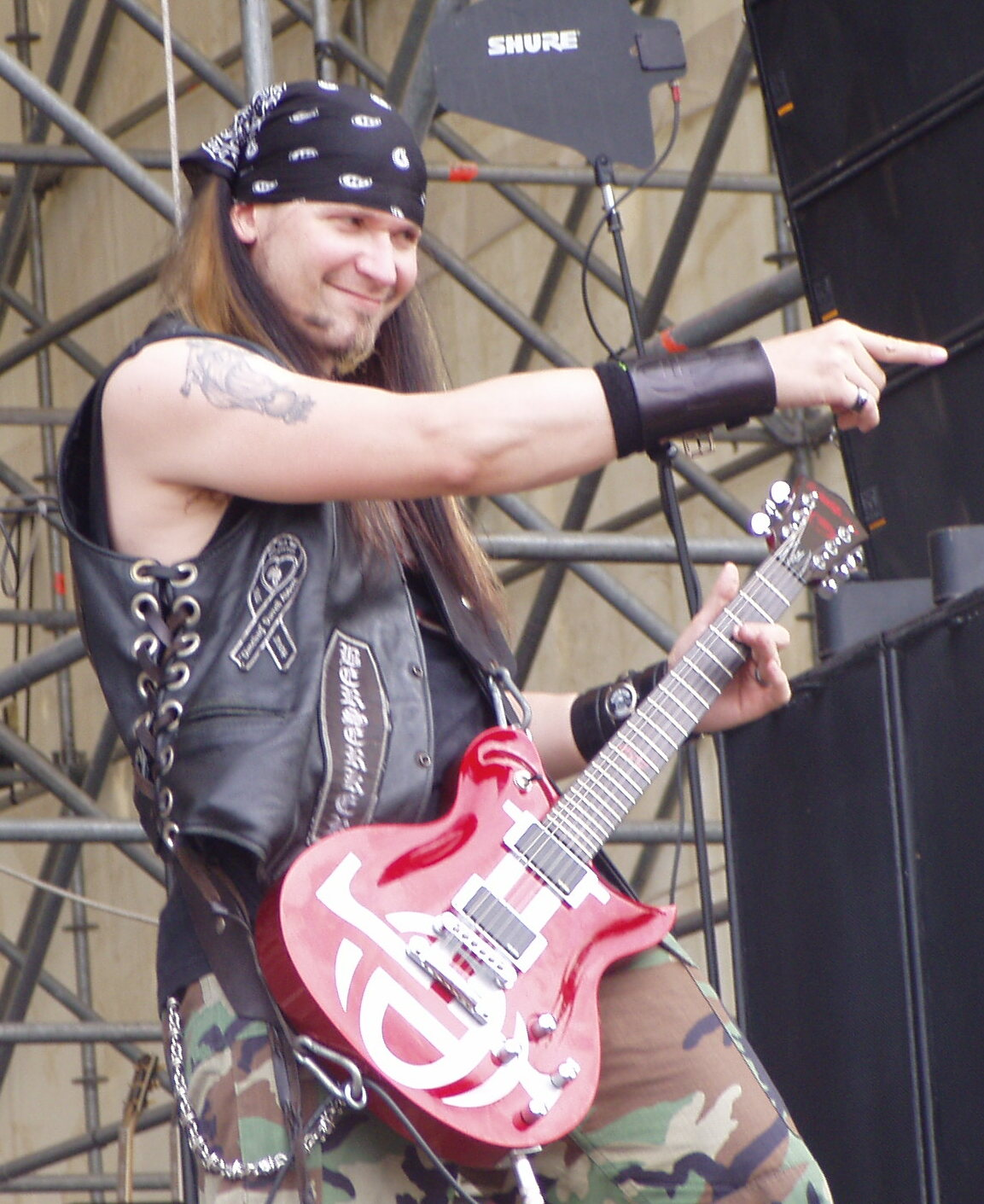
- Catanese performing with Black Label Society in 2007

Background information
- Also known as: Evil Twin
- Genres: Heavy metal, hard rock
- Occupation: Guitarist
- Years active: 1996–2018
- Member of: Speed X
- Formerly of: Black Label Society

Nicholas William Catanese (born June 2, 1971) is an American musician. He is best known as a former rhythm guitarist for heavy metal band Black Label Society. He supported lead player Zakk Wylde, who has commented that "If I'm Keith Richards, he's Mick Taylor". In 2018, Catanese was found guilty of sexual misconduct with a minor.

== Career ==
Nicknamed "The Evil Twin" for his capability to keep up with Wylde, Catanese joined with him when he noticed Wylde's email address in a magazine, and on a whim told Wylde that if he ever needed a guitar player to let him know. Wylde had been discussing with his wife about getting a second guitarist that very day, then got back to Catanese, the two met up and jammed and Catanese joined Wylde on the Book of Shadows tour (Wylde's solo album). When Wylde was looking to form a band in 1998, Catanese recommended drummer Phil Ondich to him. Sonic Brew was recorded, and in 1999, John DeServio was added to the lineup on bass—Black Label Society was officially formed. Ondich was eventually replaced by Craig Nunenmacher, and several bassists (Steve Gibb, Mike Inez, Robert Trujillo, and James Lomenzo) replaced JD until he ultimately returned to the band in October 2005. Catanese left Black Label Society in December 2013.

Nick Catanese also appeared in the movie Rock Star in 2001. He played guitarist Xander Cummins, of the fictional Steel Dragon tribute band Blood Pollution. The film also featured performances by musicians such as Zakk Wylde, Jason Bonham, Myles Kennedy, Brian Vander Ark, Blas Elias, Jeff Pilson and Ralph Saenz. He also has credits on Black Label Society's concert DVDs, Boozed, Broozed and Broken-Boned and The European Invasion – Doom Troopin.

Catanese plays Paul Reed Smith electric guitars, and plays Gibson acoustic guitars live with Black Label Society. Nick previously played Washburn guitars, and moved to Paul Reed Smith when his Washburn contract expired on January 7, 2009. PRS later made him an 'Evil Twin' signature model.

Catanese formed the band Speed X with Mike Stone from Queensrÿche (guitar and vocals), Josh Sattler (bass) and drummer Mike Froedge, both from DoubleDrive in 2010, and later formed a band with bassist Vinnie Salvatore and drummer Dusty Winterrowd.

== Sexual misconduct with a minor ==
In January 2018, Catanese was found guilty of sending explicit photos of himself to one of his 14-year-old guitar students as well as requesting explicit photos and sex acts from her. He was convicted of unlawful contact, corruption of a minor, and endangering the welfare of children in Allegheny County, Pennsylvania. In addition to being sentenced to five years probation, he must also register as a sex offender under Megan's Law for the next 25 years, avoid contact with minors, and have no access to Internet-capable computers.
