= Oceana (album) =

Studio album by Derek Sherinian
- Released: September 5, 2011
- Recorded: January 2 – May 31, 2011
- Studio: Beachwood Manor Studios in Burbank, California; Phantom Recordings in Sherman Oaks, Los Angeles
- Genre: Instrumental rock, progressive metal, jazz fusion
- Length: 47:03
- Label: Music Theories
- Producer: Derek Sherinian, Simon Phillips

Derek Sherinian chronology
Molecular Heinosity (2009)	Oceana (2011)	The Phoenix (2020)

Professional ratings
Review scores
Source	Rating
AllMusic	3.5/5 stars

Oceana is the seventh studio album by keyboardist Derek Sherinian, released on September 5, 2011, through Music Theories Recordings. After his recording sessions for the album, guitarist Joe Bonamassa posted on his official forum: "This session was one of the most challenging of my career. To be in the studio with Derek Sherinian and Simon Phillips [is] daunting. A huge thanks to both Derek and Simon for getting me through it. I learned a lot. Oceana is a killer record. Highly recommended."

== Track listing ==
No.	Title	Music	Length
1.	"Five Elements"	Derek Sherinian, Simon Phillips	4:37
2.	"Mercury 7"	Sherinian, Phillips	4:29
3.	"Mulholland"	Sherinian, Phillips	5:56
4.	"Euphoria"	Sherinian, Phillips	5:34
5.	"Ghost Runner"	Sherinian, Steve Stevens	4:54
6.	"El camino diablo"	Sherinian, Doug Aldrich	5:06
7.	"I Heard That"	Sherinian, Joe Bonamassa, Phillips	4:53
8.	"Seven Sins"	Sherinian, Phillips	5:56
9.	"Oceana"	Sherinian, Stevens, Phillips	5:38
Total length:			47:03

== Personnel ==
- Derek Sherinian – keyboard, engineering, production, executive production
- Tony MacAlpine – guitar (tracks 1, 2)
- Steve Lukather – guitar (tracks 3, 4, 8)
- Steve Stevens – guitar (tracks 5, 9)
- Doug Aldrich – guitar (track 6)
- Joe Bonamassa – guitar (track 7)
- Simon Phillips – drums, engineering, mixing, production
- Jimmy Johnson – bass (except tracks 5, 9)
- Tony Franklin – bass (tracks 5, 9)
- Alex Todorov – engineering
- Brad Vance – mastering
