= Vortex (Derek Sherinian album) =

Studio album by Derek Sherinian
- Released: July 1, 2022
- Genres: Instrumental rock, progressive rock, progressive metal
- Length: 46:46
- Label: Inside Out Music
- Producers: Derek Sherinian, Simon Phillips

Derek Sherinian chronology
The Phoenix (2020)	Vortex (2022)

Vortex is the ninth studio album by keyboardist Derek Sherinian, released on 1 July 2022.

== Critical reception ==
Vortex has been critically well received. Dan McHugh gave the album a rating of nine out of ten and stated that it 'is crammed to the rafters with confidence and innovation that shines through on every track'. Kevin McCallum gave the album a rating of seven out of ten and stated that it 'is a good release' containing 'top level musicianship'. Luca Zakk gave the album a rating of ten out of ten and stated that it 'overwhelms mercilessly'. Zakk stated that the first track, The Vortex (featuring Steve Stevens), 'takes your breath away'. He described the second track, Fire Horse, as explosive 'with funky and proggy digressions'. Zakk stated that the third track, Scorpion, contained 'a melodic and rhythmic construction between prog and jazz, with a dizzying chase between piano, bass and drums'. Zakk described the fourth track, Seven Seas, as 'dreamy' and the fifth track, Key Lime Blues, as 'funky'. A reviewer for OltreRock stated that the songs on the album are 'all compelling, never banal, with very different atmospheres, each musician takes us to an alternative dimension with the impression of a journey into a castle of music with many different rooms'.

Bernard Law stated that the album 'is a very strong album, possibly one of Derek's best'. Law commented that 'typically for Derek, the album portrays an enterprising changeable sound that sees him blending rock with elements drawn from funk, progressive rock, and jazz, resulting in a great big slab of an album steeped in 1970's styled fusion'. In Law's view, the music on the album 'is always lively and shifting, multi-voiced and emphatic'. Nonetheless, Law opined that 'for all the album's vicissitudinous...it has a palpable cohesiveness'. According to Law, 'the genres are not domineering but serve a purpose'. Law noted that Scorpion 'is probably as near to jazz as the album gets, a tune full of piano-driven momentum while Key Lime Blues is a funkier danceable tune that moves and shifts'. Law described the opening title track as 'dramatic and portentous' and 'the expansive colourful closer Aurora Australis as 'the closest the tunes come to an epic'. In his review of the album, Doc Rock stated that 'it rocks, it progs and even the blues find their way into the track list'. Doc Rock commented that 'just as Mr. Sherinian sometimes takes centre stage (e.g. on Scorpion), he can also let other musicians and their instruments take precedence'. Doc Rock concluded of the album that 'overall I think it's a strong disc and for being a purely instrumental work, the material comes across as varied and entertaining'.

In his review of the album, Matthias Mineur stated that it contains 'hardly a melody that doesn't whistle around the listener's ears at breathtaking speed, hardly a groove, a time signature in which little gimmicks or highly complex breaks weren't implanted'. Mineur continued that 'all of this would be hard to digest if Sherinian didn't once again celebrate a compositionally astonishingly light-footed mixture of metal, rock, fusion, jazz and blues'. Mineur concluded that 'that's why you can enjoy this disc (almost) continuously, even if it's completely without vocals'. Peter Hollecker described the album as an 'instrumental album with many funk and fusion moments as well as famous guests'. Andreas Schiffmann stated that 'Derek Sherinian's current alliance with guitarists he knows and respects is a stroke of luck for fans of sophisticated but informal instrumental music'.

Bryce Van Patten gave the album a 10 out of 10 rating and stated that it 'has exciting tracks, groovy tracks, wild jazzy tracks, and a whole lot more'. 'All in all', Van Patten concluded, the album 'is a must own for all fans of Dream Theater, Sons of Apollo, Weather Report and 70s Heavy Fusion of every kind. Nikos Katapidis stated that the album contained 'technical impressiveness' and 'essential songs and melodies that will stay with you'. Jani L. stated that 'the sheer versatility and the no-holds-barred sort of creativity oozing from the songs make listening to his trademark shreddings a highly enjoyable experience'. They also stated that Sherinian's 'Hammond grooves resonate strongly with the air of Jon Lord and when he fires on all cylinders, his shredding triggers flashbacks by turns of Steve Vai and Snarky Puppy'. Dave Campbell stated that the album maintains 'the high standard [that] he [Sherinian] has set across his career' and that Sherinian 'lets his guest musicians contribute to the overall sound'.

== Track listing ==
1. "The Vortex" – 4:25 (Sherinian/Phillips/Stevens)
2. "Fire Horse" – 4:27 (Sherinian/Phillips)
3. "Scorpion" – 3:39 (Sherinian/Phillips)
4. "Seven Seas" – 6:16 (Sherinian/Phillips/Stevens)
5. "Key Lime Blues" – 4:43 (Sherinian/Phillips)
6. "Die Kobra" – 6:44 (Sherinian)
7. "Nomad's Land" – 5:21 (Phillips)
8. "Aurora Australis" – 11:11 (Sherinian/Phillips)

== Personnel ==
- Derek Sherinian – keyboard, production
- Simon Phillips – drums, production
- Tony Franklin – bass guitar (tracks 1, 6)
- Ernest Tibbs – bass guitar (tracks 2, 5, 7)
- Ric Fierabracci – bass guitar (track 3)
- Jeff Berlin – bass guitar (track 4)
- Jimmy Johnson – bass guitar (track 8)
- Steve Stevens – guitar (tracks 1, 4)
- Nuno Bettencourt – guitar (track 2)
- Joe Bonamassa – guitar (track 5)
- Steve Lukather – guitar (track 5)
- Michael Schenker – guitar (track 6)
- Zakk Wylde – guitar (track 6)
- Mike Stern – guitar (track 7)
- Ron "Bumblefoot" Thal – guitar (track 8)
- Anna Camporini - cello (track 6)
- Carlo Calegari - double bass (track 6)
- Ashwin Batish - sitar (track 6)
- Pirro Gjiondi - violin/viola (track 6)
- Armen Ra - theremin (tracks 1, 2, 4, 6, 8)
