= Tony Franklin (musician) =

English musician (born 1962)

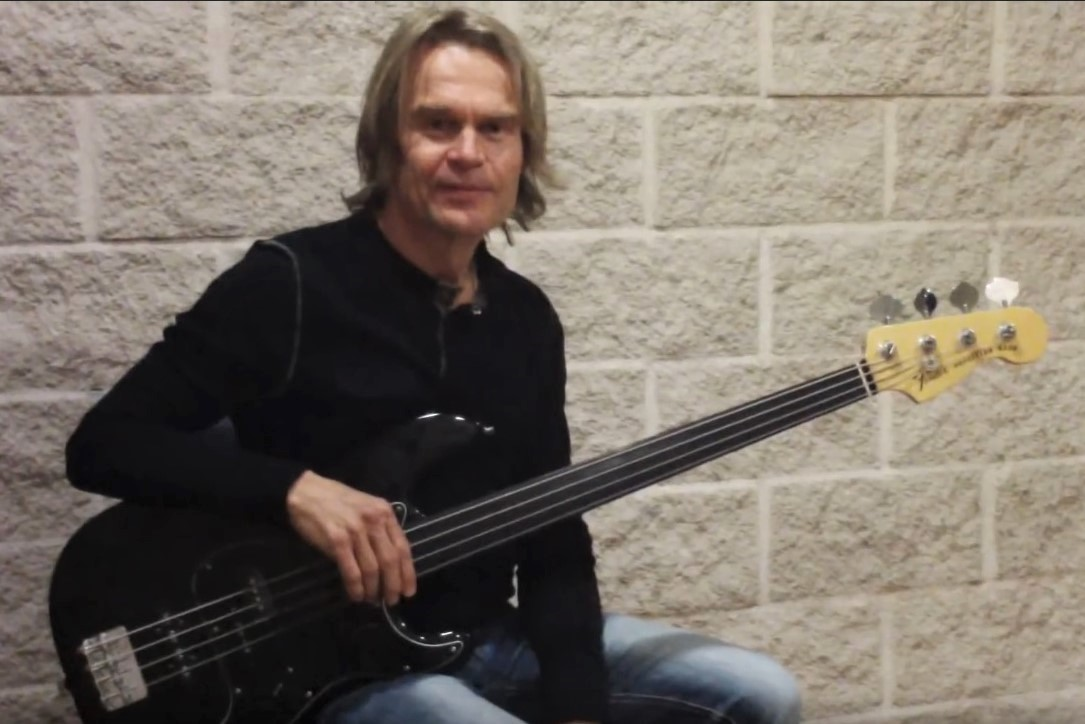
- Franklin in 2012

Background information
- Also known as: The Fretless Monster
- Born: Anthony James Franklin; 2 April 1962 (age 64); Derby, England
- Genres: Hard rock, blues-rock, folk rock, heavy metal, progressive rock
- Occupations: Musician, songwriter
- Instruments: Fretted/fretless bass, keyboards, synthesizers, vocals, guitar
- Years active: 1982–present
- Website: Official website

Anthony James Franklin (born 2 April 1962) is an English rock musician, best known for his work on the fretless bass guitar with Roy Harper, the Firm, Jimmy Page, Paul Rodgers, John Sykes' Blue Murder, David Gilmour, Kate Bush, Whitesnake, Kenny Wayne Shepherd, Donna Lewis, Gary Hoey and most recently with Lou Gramm

== Biography ==
Born into a musical family, Franklin first took the stage at age of five. He got his big break in 1984 as bassist in the supergroup The Firm, with Jimmy Page, Paul Rodgers and Chris Slade. The band released two successful albums and performed sell out tours of the USA, UK and Europe.

In 1987 Franklin joined forces with former Whitesnake guitarist and songwriter John Sykes, in the band Blue Murder. With drumming legend Carmine Appice, their debut album released in 1989, showcased the bombastic and melodic stylings of each band member. Popular songs included "Valley Of The Kings" and "Jelly Roll".

Franklin went on to perform with Kate Bush, David Gilmour of Pink Floyd, Whitesnake, John Fogerty, Roy Harper, Lou Gramm of Foreigner, Donna Lewis, Kenny Wayne Shepherd, Italian superstars Vasco Rossi and Eros Ramazzotti and many others. An in-demand session ace, Franklin has appeared on hundreds of albums.

Franklin's television credits include the Late Show with David Letterman, Beverly Hills 90210, The Rosie O'Donnell Show, Good Morning America, and Top of the Pops and others. In 2006, Sony Creative Software released Tony Franklin: Not Just Another Pretty Bass, Franklin's first sample loop library, in 2006.

While maintaining his music career, from September 2003 through July 2011, Franklin served as Artist Relations Manager for Fender and SWR. He returned to music performance full-time in mid-2011, when he joined Kenny Wayne Shepherd's band for the tour supporting the guitarist's 2011 album How I Go. Franklin can be heard on Shepherd's album, "Goin' Home", released in the summer of 2014. He toured as a member of Lou Gramm's Allstars in 2026, along with Gary Hoey.

== Signature instruments ==
Franklin is mostly known for his work on fretless bass. In January 2006 Fender introduced the Tony Franklin Fretless Precision Bass, a distinctive instrument, with an alder body and modern C-shaped maple neck with an unfinished and unfretted ebony fingerboard with side dot position markers. Other features include vintage tuners, with a Hipshot Bass Xtender drop-D tuner on the E string, a three-way pickup selector switch that controls, an American Series Precision Bass mid pickup, and Franklin's signature Jazz Bass bridge pickup with hex-screw pole pieces and ceramic bar magnets.

Besides his fretless bass, Franklin has also used a fretted Precision Bass on recordings and in concert. From 2008 to 2015, Fender offered a fretted version of Franklin's signature Precision Bass, which otherwise features the same specs as his fretless signature model.

== Other career highlights ==
Prior to his work with the Firm, Franklin toured and recorded with English folk/rock singer-songwriter and guitarist Roy Harper, appearing on eight of his albums between 1982 and 2013.

In 1996, Franklin played on long-time friend Donna Lewis's album Now in a Minute, which spawned the worldwide hit single “I Love You Always Forever". Substantial touring followed the release of the single throughout the U.S., U.K., Japan, Europe and Canada.

In 1997, Franklin toured the world with Whitesnake as part of the Last Hurrah Tour.

Franklin cites John Deacon, Paul McCartney, James Jamerson and Jaco Pastorius as his main influences.

== Influence ==
In a 2023 interview, Pearl Jam bassist Jeff Ament cited Franklin as an influence, specifically on his use of a slide harmonic on the hit song "Even Flow". "I knew at the beginning of Pearl Jam that the way Stone [Gossard] was writing, it was very Jimmy Page – very riffy. And because of Tony Franklin, I knew that fretless would add a really cool voice and texture to rock music. So that harmonic, I'm kind of ripping The Firm's 'Radioactive.' And I figured it out by accident. I was always obsessed with playing harmonics on bass, but at some point I remember accidentally hitting harmonics and sliding on it, so I started experimenting with that part of it. So mistakes, and also having in the back of my head that sound of 'Radioactive.' Hats off Tony Franklin!"

== Select Discography ==
- Roy Harper – Work of Heart (Public Records, 1982)
- Roy Harper & Jimmy Page – Whatever Happened to Jugula? (Beggar's Banquet, 1984)
- The Firm – The Firm (Atlantic, 1985)
- The Firm – Mean Business (Atlantic, 1986)
- David Gilmour and Kate Bush – Secret Policeman's Third Ball (Virgin Video, 1987)
- Jimmy Page – Outrider (Geffen, 1988)
- Roy Harper – In Between Every Line (EMI, 1987)
- Roy Harper – Descendants of Smith (EMI, 1988)
- Blue Murder – Blue Murder (Geffen, 1989)
- Roy Harper – Once (Awareness, 1990)
- Don Dokken – Up from the Ashes (Geffen, 1990)
- Glenn Hughes – L.A. Blues Authority Volume II: Glenn Hughes - Blues (Shrapnel, 1992)
- Roy Harper – Death or Glory? (Awareness, 1992)
- Gary Hoey – Animal Instinct (Reprise, 1993)
- Blue Murder – Nothin' But Trouble (Geffen, 1993)
- Gary Hoey – The Endless Summer II (Reprise, 1994)
- Tony MacAlpine – Premonition (Shrapnel, 1994)
- Driver – Driver (Trauma / Atlantic, 1994)
- Jeff Beck Tribute – Beckology (Shrapnel, 1995)
- Lana Lane – "Love Is An Illusion" (Think Tank Media, 1995)
- Gary Hoey – Gary Hoey (BMG, 1995)
- Tony MacAlpine – Evolution (Shrapnel, 1995)
- Celestial Winds – Oceans of Love (Universe Music, 1995)
- MOM: Music for our Mother Ocean – Benefit compilation (Interscope, 1996)
- Warren DeMartini – Surf's Up! (Polydor Japan, 1996)
- Carmine Appice – Guitar Zeus (Apalon Japan, 1996)
- Marty Friedman – True Obsessions (Shrapnel, 1996)
- Naomi Tamura – N (Polydor Japan, 1996)
- Donna Lewis – Now in a Minute (Atlantic, 1996)
- Graham Bonnet – "Underground" (Victor, 1997)
- John Sykes – Loveland (Mercury Japan, 1997)
- Gary Hoey – Bug Alley (Surfdog, 1997)
- Various – Dragon Attack: A Tribute to Queen (De-Rock, 1997)
- Carmine Appice – Guitar Zeus 2 (Polydor Japan, 1997)
- Various – Thunderbolt: A Tribute to AC/DC (De-Rock, 1997)
- Pearl – Pearl (Polydor Japan, 1997)
- Sounds of Wood and Steel – Compilation (Windham Hill, 1998)
- Pearl – 4 Infinity (East West Japan, 1998)
- Gary Hoey – "Hocus Pocus Live" – (Surfdog, 1998)
- Donna Lewis – Blue Planet (Atlantic, 1998)
- Various – Cozy Powell Forever (Electric Angel Japan, 1998)
- Derek Sherinian – Planet X (Shrapnel, 1999)
- Graham Bonnet – "The Day I Went Mad" (JVC, 1999)
- Lana Lane – Queen of the Ocean (1999)
- Pearl – "Live in Japan" (Public Red, 1999)
- Various – "Humanary Stew – A Tribute To Alice Cooper" (Cleopatra Records, 1999)
- Rocket Scientists – "Oblivion Days" (1999)
- Gary Wright – Human Love (Warner, 2000)
- David Coverdale – Into the Light (EMI, 2000)
- Lana Lane – Secrets of Astrology (2000)
- Lana Lane – Ballads Collection II (2000)
- Various – Metallic Assault: A Tribute to Metallica (2000)
- Tony Franklin – Brave New Tomorrow (JVC/Victor Entertainment, 2000)
- Erik Norlander – Into the Sunset (2000)
- Roy Harper – "Hats Off" (Science Friction, 2001)
- Derek Sherinian – Inertia (2001)
- Doug Aldrich – "Alter Ego" (2001)
- Lana Lane – Love Is an Illusion Special Edition (2001)
- Willie Waldman – Trumpet Ride (2002)
- Lana Lane – Project Shangri-La (2002)
- Various – An All Star Line Up Performing the Songs of Pink Floyd (2002)
- Lana Lane – Covers Collection (2002)
- Tony Franklin – Wonderland (JVC/Victor Entertainment – July 2003)
- Derek Sherinian – Black Utopia (2003)
- Erik Norlander – "Music Machine" (2003)
- Derek Sherinian – Mythology (2004)
- Chris Catena – Freak Out! (Imr/Frontiers Rec., 2004)
- Vasco Rossi – Buoni o Cattivi (number 1 album in Italy, 2004)
- Eros Ramazzotti – Calma Apparente (number 1 album in Italy, 2005)
- Kelly Keeling – "Giving Sight to the Eye" (2005)
- Derek Sherinian – Blood of the Snake (2006)
- Quiet Riot – Rehab (2006)
- Lana Lane – Gemini (2006)
- Appice / Travers – "Bazooka" (2006)
- Carmine Appice – "Ultimate Guitar Zeus" (2006)
- Sir Lord Baltimore – Sir Lord Baltimore III Raw (2006)
- Frankie Banali / Various – "24/7/365 – A Tribute To Led Zeppelin (2007)
- Eros Ramazzotti – "E2" (Sony / BMG, 2007)
- Terry Ilous – "Here And Gone" (2007)
- Vasco Rossi – "Il mondo che vorrei" (2008)
- Menchen – Red Rock (guitarist Bill Menchen's project, 2008)
- Chris Catena – Discovery (Escape/Frontiers Rec., 2008)
- Tadashi Goto – Innervisions (SPV/Progrock Rec., 2008)
- We Wish You a Metal Xmas and a Headbanging New Year – O' Christmas Tree (Armoury Rec., 2008)
- Derek Sherinian – Molecular Heinosity (2009)
- Tim Ripper Owens – "Play My Game" (2009)
- Freakshow – "Freakshow" (2009)
- Carmine Appice – "Guitar Heroes (2010)
- Thomas Tomsen – Sunflickers (2010)
- Vasco Rossi – "Vivere o niente" (2011)
- Derek Sherinian – Oceana (2011)
- Rob Moratti – "Victory" (2011)
- Docker's Guild – The Mystic Technocracy – Season 1: The Age of Ignorance (2012)
- DR.U (Chris Catena) – Alieni Alienati (Valery Rec./Frontiers/Edel 2012)
- Roy Harper – Man and Myth (2013)
- Kenny Wayne Shepherd – "Goin' Home" (2014)
- Rated X (Frontiers 2014)
- Joel Hoekstra's 13 – Dying To Live (2015)
- Rob Moratti – Transcendent (2016)
- Rob Moratti – Renaissance (2019)
- The Feckers – Live To Fight Another Day (2020)
- Rob Moratti – Paragon (2020)
- Derek Sherinian – The Phoenix (2020)
- Chris Catena's Rock City Tribe – Truth in Unity (2020)
- Leo Carnicella – Until a new dawn (2021)
- Joel Hoekstra's 13 – Running Games (2021)
- Leo Carnicella – Super~Sargasso Sea (2022)
- Derek Sherinian- Vortex (2022)
- Ten Cent Revenge - "Road 2 Ruin" (2022)
- Dan-I – Listen to the Magic (2023)
- Cactus – Temple of Blues (2024)
- Leon Alvarado – The Changing Tide (2024)
- Trope - "Here's to the Lonely" (2024)
- Gordian feat Graham Bonnet - Eyes Grow Wide (2025)
