= The Phoenix (Derek Sherinian album) =

Studio album by Derek Sherinian
- Released: September 18, 2020
- Genre: Instrumental rock, progressive rock, progressive metal
- Length: 42:38
- Label: Inside Out Music
- Producer: Derek Sherinian, Simon Phillips

Derek Sherinian chronology
Oceana (2011)	The Phoenix (2020)	Vortex (2022)

The Phoenix is the eighth studio album by keyboardist Derek Sherinian, released on 18 September 2020. It is Sherinian's first solo studio album since Oceana, which was released in 2011.

== Critical reception ==
The Phoenix has been critically well received. Bosco Aguilar of Prog Report stated that "when I finished listening to the album for the first time, I found myself excited for everyone to listen to it. Fantastic production, catchy and powerful songs, each guitarist's personality shined across the album, and of course a Derek Sherinian who shows again why he is one of the greatest prog keyboardists". Rodrigo Altaf Sonic Perspectives stated that "true to their vision, Derek and Simon achieved what is seemingly impossible for an album with so many guests: a unified sound and a clear direction. Perhaps inadvertently, they created THE guitar album of 2020, even though keyboards and drums are the main driving force throughout the compositions". Steph Warren stated that "the riffs and melodies on these tracks are very reminiscent of early Led Zeppelin with great rolling waves of guitar and keyboard, the mix of different inputs create a wide space of sound". Laurence Todd stated that the album will "have a definite appeal to prog fans, given when Sherinian made his name, but it should also appeal to anyone with a fondness for exceptional musicianship of a modern fusion persuasion with some crunching guitar included just for good measure". David Pearce of Rock Poser stated that the album "cements the already high reputation of Derek Sherinian and confirms him as one of the foremost keyboardists of this or any other era".

== Track listing ==
1. "The Phoenix" – 5:24 (Sherinian)
2. "Empyrean Sky" – 3:56 (Sherinian/Phillips)
3. "Clouds of Ganymede" – 6:02 (Sherinian)
4. "Dragonfly" – 3:46 (Sherinian/Phillips)
5. "Temple of Helios" – 6:01 (Sherinian/Phillips)
6. "Them Changes" – 5:28 (Buddy Miles)
7. "Octopus Pedigree" – 5:04 (Sherinian/Phillips)
8. "Pesadelo" – 6:55 (Sherinian/Loureiro/Phillips)

== Personnel ==
- Derek Sherinian – keyboard, production
- Simon Phillips - drums, production
- Zakk Wylde - guitar (track 1)
- Ron "Bumblefoot" Thal - guitar (tracks 2, 5, 7)
- Steve Vai - guitar (track 3)
- Joe Bonamassa - guitar, vocals (track 6)
- Kiko Loureiro - guitar (track 8)
- Billy Sheehan - bass guitar (track 1)
- Jimmy Johnson - bass guitar (tracks 2, 5, 7)
- Tony Franklin - bass guitar (tracks 3 and 8)
- Ernest Tibbs- bass guitar (tracks 4 and 6)
- Armen Ra- theremin (tracks 1 and 8)
