= After the Reign (album) =

Studio album by Blackfoot
- Released: 1994
- Studio: Sonic Recording, Cape Coral, Florida
- Genre: Southern rock
- Length: 43:43
- Label: Wildcat Records
- Producer: Rick Medlocke

Blackfoot chronology
Medicine Man (1990)	After the Reign (1994)	Live On The King Biscuit Flower Hour (1998)

Professional ratings
Review scores
Source	Rating
AllMusic	2.5/5 stars

After the Reign is a Blackfoot album released on May 24, 1994, through Wildcat Records. Guitarist Zakk Wylde makes a guest appearance on the title track playing the second solo in the lead break section.

== Track listing ==
All songs by Rickey Medlocke and Benny Rappa except where noted:

1. "Sittin' On Top of the World" (Chester Arthur Burnett) – 4:40
2. "Nobody Rides For Free" – 3:58 (Medlocke, Mark Woerpel)
3. "Tupelo Honey" – 4:31 (Van Morrison)
4. "Rainbow" – 4:28
5. "It's All Over Now" (B. Rappa*, M. Woerpel*, R. Medlocke*) – 4:29
6. "The Road's My Middle Name" – 4:06 (Bonnie Raitt)
7. "Hang Time" – 4:24
8. "Tonight" – 3:40
9. "After The Reign" – 5:19 (Medlocke, Rappa, Woerpel)
10. "Bandelaro" – 3:34

== Personnel ==
- Rickey Medlocke – vocals, guitar
- Benny Rappa – drums, percussion
- Mark Woerpel – guitar, synthesizer
- Tim Stunson – bass guitar
