= Book of Shadows II =

Studio album by Zakk Wylde
- Released: April 8, 2016
- Recorded: 2014–2015
- Genre: Southern rock, folk rock
- Length: 64:53
- Label: Entertainment One Music
- Producer: Zakk Wylde

Zakk Wylde chronology
Book of Shadows (1996)	Book of Shadows II (2016)

Professional ratings
Review scores
Source	Rating
AllMusic	3.5/5 stars
Blabbermouth.net	8.5/10 stars

Book of Shadows II is the second solo album by American musician Zakk Wylde. It was released on April 8, 2016, via Entertainment One Music.

== Track listing ==
All tracks are written by Zakk Wylde.

No.	Title	Length
1.	"Autumn Changes"	5:14
2.	"Tears of December"	3:35
3.	"Lay Me Down"	6:06
4.	"Lost Prayer"	4:27
5.	"Darkest Hour"	5:05
6.	"The Levee"	5:47
7.	"Eyes of Burden"	3:43
8.	"Forgotten Memory"	3:49
9.	"Yesterday's Tears"	4:15
10.	"Harbors of Pity"	4:10
11.	"Sorrowed Regrets"	5:46
12.	"Useless Apologies"	3:38
13.	"Sleeping Dogs"	4:36
14.	"The King"	4:42

CD/digital download bonus track
No.	Title	Length
15.	"Sleeping Dogs" (featuring Corey Taylor)	4:36

Japanese edition bonus tracks
No.	Title	Length
16.	"Lost Prayer" (Alternative Version)	4:24
17.	"Eyes of Burden" (Alternative Version)	3:42

Europe/Australia/New Zealand edition bonus tracks
No.	Title	Length
16.	"Tears of December" (Alternative Version)	3:25
17.	"Lost Prayer" (Alternative Version)	4:24

== Personnel ==
- Zakk Wylde – vocals, guitars, piano, Hammond organ, strings, producer, mixing
- John "JD" DeServio – bass, mixing, associate producer
- Jeff Fabb – drums
- Adam Klumpp – engineer, mixing, associate producer
- Peter A. Barker – mastering

== Charts ==
Chart (2016)	Peak position
Australian Albums (ARIA)	44
Austrian Albums (Ö3 Austria)	62
Belgian Albums (Ultratop Flanders)	157
Canadian Albums (Billboard)	23
Finnish Albums (Suomen virallinen lista)	33
French Albums (SNEP)	96
German Albums (Offizielle Top 100)	70
Italian Albums (FIMI)	72
Swiss Albums (Schweizer Hitparade)	39
UK Albums (OCC)	75
US Billboard 200	18
