= Black Utopia =

Studio album by Derek Sherinian
- Released: April 29, 2003
- Genre: Instrumental rock
- Length: 45:02
- Label: Inside Out Music
- Producer: Derek Sherinian, Simon Phillips

Derek Sherinian chronology
Inertia (2001)	Black Utopia (2003)	Mythology (2004)

Professional ratings
Review scores
Source	Rating
Allmusic	3/5 stars

Black Utopia is the third solo album by keyboard player Derek Sherinian. In addition to the returning members Zakk Wylde, Simon Phillips and Steve Lukather, three new musicians joined Sherinian: bass guitarist Billy Sheehan and guitarists Yngwie Malmsteen – with whom Sherinian had toured in 2001 – and Al Di Meola. "One of the highlights of my career was flying to Miami to produce Yngwie, and the next day Al Di Meola - all for my record!" The song "Axis Of Evil", (co-written with KISS drummer Eric Singer), has Zakk Wylde and Yngwie Malmsteen in a guitar duel. Black Utopia was the beginning of an ongoing collaboration with drummer Brian Tichy, and album cover artist Mattias Noren. Black Utopia is Sherinian's best selling solo record to date.

In Japan, the cover of Black Utopia was altered to remove the cross in the title; Derek Sherinian commented that the cross "meant nothing" and was added for aesthetic purposes.

The title of the track "Nightmare Cinema" comes from an alternate name used by Dream Theater during the period when Sherinian was a member of the band. Dream Theater would occasionally perform encores under that name, with each band member playing a different instrument than their primary one.

== Track listing ==
1. "The Fury" – 0:52 (Sherinian)
2. "The Sons of Anu" – 7:10 (Sherinian/Tichy)
  - I. For the Glory of Enki
  - II. Of the Ashes of Ur
  - III. Return of the Nephilim
3. "Nightmare Cinema" – 5:25 (Sherinian/Tichy)
4. "Stony Days" – 6:17 (Sherinian/Franklin/Phillips)
5. "Starcycle" – 5:04 (Jan Hammer; Jeff Beck cover)
6. "Axis of Evil" – 6:09 (Sherinian/Singer)
7. "Gypsy Moth" – 1:59 (Sherinian)
8. "Sweet Lament" – 3:14 (Sherinian)
9. "Black Utopia" – 8:50 (Sherinian/Tichy)

== Musicians ==
- Derek Sherinian - keyboards
- Yngwie Malmsteen - guitar on tracks 1, 2 and 6
- Al Di Meola - nylon guitar on tracks 2 and 7, lead guitar on track 2
- Zakk Wylde - guitar on tracks 3, 6 and 9
- Steve Lukather - guitar on tracks 4, 5 and 8
- Brian Tichy - additional guitars on tracks 2, 3, 6 and 9
- Billy Sheehan - bass guitar on tracks 2, 6 and 9
- Tony Franklin - fretless bass guitar on tracks 2–9
- Jerry Goodman - violin on tracks 2, 3, 6–9
- Simon Phillips - drums on tracks 2–6, 8 and 9
- Mike Shapiro - percussion on track 7
