= Blood of the Snake =

Studio album by Derek Sherinian
- Released: August 1, 2006
- Genre: Instrumental rock, progressive metal
- Length: 52:56
- Label: Inside Out
- Producer: Derek Sherinian, Simon Phillips

Derek Sherinian chronology
Mythology (2004)	Blood of the Snake (2006)	Molecular Heinosity (2009)

Professional ratings
Review scores
Source	Rating
Allmusic	3.5/5 stars

Blood of the Snake is the fifth solo album by keyboard player Derek Sherinian. It has contributions from Billy Idol, Zakk Wylde, Guns N' Roses guitarist Slash, John Petrucci of Dream Theater, in addition to previous collaborators Simon Phillips, Yngwie Malmsteen, Tony Franklin, Steve Lukather and Brian Tichy.

A video for a cover version of Mungo Jerry's "In the Summertime", with Sherinian, Idol, Slash, Franklin and Tichy, was released in conjunction with the album. In a reference to Idol, the bass drum is painted with the script "Derek Sherinian and The Rebellious Yellers!".

Sherinian also worked with duduk master Djivan Gasparyan on the song "Prelude to Battle" on the release, written for his great-grandmother, who had survived the Armenian genocide..

== Track listing ==
1. Czar of Steel – 6:01 (Sherinian/Phillips)
2. Man with No Name – 6:55 (Sherinian/Tichy/Wylde)
3. Phantom Shuffle – 4:21 (Sherinian/Phillips)
4. Been Here Before – 4:30 (Sherinian)
5. Blood of the Snake – 6:09 (Sherinian/Tichy)
6. On the Moon – 4:34 (Sherinian/Phillips)
7. The Monsoon – 6:08 (Sherinian/Tichy)
8. Prelude to Battle – 2:55 (Sherinian/Tichy)
9. Viking Massacre – 4:58 (Sherinian/Tichy)
10. In the Summertime – 3:51* (Ray Dorset)

* Note: The official time printed in the CD liner notes is 3:51, but the track actually extends to 6:32, and includes a little hidden audio clip of Sherinian and his friends supposedly celebrating the new album release.

== Personnel ==
- Derek Sherinian - all keyboards
- Billy Idol - vocals on track 10
- John Petrucci - guitar on track 1
- Zakk Wylde - guitar on tracks 2, 5, 7; vocals on track 2
- Brad Gillis - guitar on tracks 4, 6
- Yngwie Malmsteen - guitar on tracks 5, 7, 8, 9
- Slash - guitar on track 10
- Tony Franklin - fretless bass guitar on tracks 1, 2, 4, 5, 6, 8; bass guitar on track 10
- Jimmy Johnson - bass guitar on track 3
- John "JD" DeServio - bass guitar on track 7
- Simon Phillips - drums on tracks 1, 3, 4, 6
- Brian Tichy - drums on tracks 2, 5, 7, 9, 10; bass guitar on track 9
- Jerry Goodman - violin on tracks 2, 4
- Brandon Fields - alto saxophone on tracks 1, 3, 6
- Jivan Gasparyan - duduk on track 8
- Dimitris Mahlis - oud on tracks 7, 8
- Mike Shapiro - percussion on track 8
