= Inertia (Derek Sherinian album) =

Studio album by Derek Sherinian
- Released: April 17, 2001
- Recorded: The Leopard Room, Hollywood Hills, California; Coy Studios, Hollywood Hills, California; Showerhead Studios, Simi Valley, California
- Genres: Instrumental rock, progressive metal, jazz fusion
- Length: 46:55
- Label: Inside Out
- Producers: Derek Sherinian, Simon Phillips

Derek Sherinian chronology
Planet X (1999)	Inertia (2001)	Black Utopia (2003)

Professional ratings
Review scores
Source	Rating
AllMusic	3/5 stars

Inertia is the second studio album by keyboardist Derek Sherinian, released in 2001 through Inside Out Music. This album marks the beginning of Sherinian's longtime collaborations with drummer Simon Phillips as well as guitarists Steve Lukather and Zakk Wylde.

== Track listing ==
No.	Title	Writer(s)	Length
1.	"Inertia"	Derek Sherinian, Simon Phillips	4:20
2.	"Frankenstein" (Edgar Winter Group cover)	Edgar Winter	3:31
3.	"Mata Hari"	Sherinian, Phillips, Tony Franklin	6:21
4.	"Evel Kneivel"	Sherinian	3:17
5.	"La pera loca"	Sherinian, Phillips	5:06
6.	"Goodbye Pork Pie Hat" (Charles Mingus cover; based on the version by Jeff Beck)	Charles Mingus	6:23
7.	"Astroglide"	Sherinian, Phillips	4:35
8.	"What a Shame"	Sherinian, Al Pitrelli	5:01
9.	"Rhapsody Intro"	Sherinian, Virgil Donati	1:41
10.	"Rhapsody in Black"	Sherinian, Donati	6:40
Total length:			46:55

== Personnel ==
- Derek Sherinian – keyboard, engineering, production
- Steve Lukather – guitar (tracks 1, 3, 5, 6, 8–10), electric sitar
- Zakk Wylde – guitar (tracks 2, 4, 8)
- Simon Phillips – drums, engineering, mixing, production
- Jerry Goodman – electric violin
- Tom Kennedy – bass (tracks 1, 6, 10)
- Tony Franklin – bass (tracks 2–4, 8)
- Jimmy Johnson – bass (5, 7)
- Albert Law – engineering
- Mitchel Forman – engineering
- Phil Soussan – engineering
- Tom Fletcher – engineering
