= Molecular Heinosity =

Studio album by Derek Sherinian
- Released: March 24, 2009
- Recorded: Beachwood Manor Studios in Burbank, California
- Genre: Instrumental rock, progressive metal
- Length: 39:43
- Label: InsideOut
- Producer: Derek Sherinian

Derek Sherinian chronology
Blood of the Snake (2006)	Molecular Heinosity (2009)	Oceana (2011)

Professional ratings
Review scores
Source	Rating
AllMusic	3.5/5 stars

Molecular Heinosity is the sixth studio album by keyboardist Derek Sherinian, released on March 24, 2009, through InsideOut Music.

== Track listing ==
No.	Title	Writer(s)	Length
1.	"Antarctica"	Derek Sherinian, Virgil Donati	5:23
2.	"Ascension"	Sherinian	2:14
3.	"Primal Eleven"	Donati	7:58
4.	"Wings of Insanity"	Sherinian, Brian Tichy	3:50
5.	"Frozen by Fire"	Sherinian, Rusty Cooley	5:18
6.	"The Lone Spaniard"	Sherinian	3:08
7.	"Molecular Intro"	Sherinian	1:01
8.	"Molecular Heinosity"	Sherinian, Tichy	3:27
9.	"So Far Gone"	Sherinian, Tichy, Zakk Wylde	7:24
Total length:			39:43

== Personnel ==
- Derek Sherinian – keyboard, engineering, mixing, producer
- Zakk Wylde – vocals (track 9), guitar (tracks 4, 9)
- Brett Garsed – guitar (tracks 1, 3)
- Rusty Cooley – guitar (track 5)
- Taka Minamino – guitar (tracks 6–8)
- Virgil Donati – drums (tracks 1–3)
- Brian Tichy – drums (tracks 4, 5, 8, 9), engineering
- Jimmy Johnson – bass (tracks 1–3)
- Rob Mules – bass (tracks 4, 5, 8)
- Tony Franklin – bass (tracks 6, 9)
- Tina Guo – cello (tracks 6, 9)
- Alex Todorov – engineering, mixing
- Peter Tinari – engineering
- Daniel Meron – engineering
- Matt Flinker – engineering
- Dave Allen – engineering
- Steve Scanlon – mixing
- Brad Vance – mastering
