= Brian Tichy =

American drummer

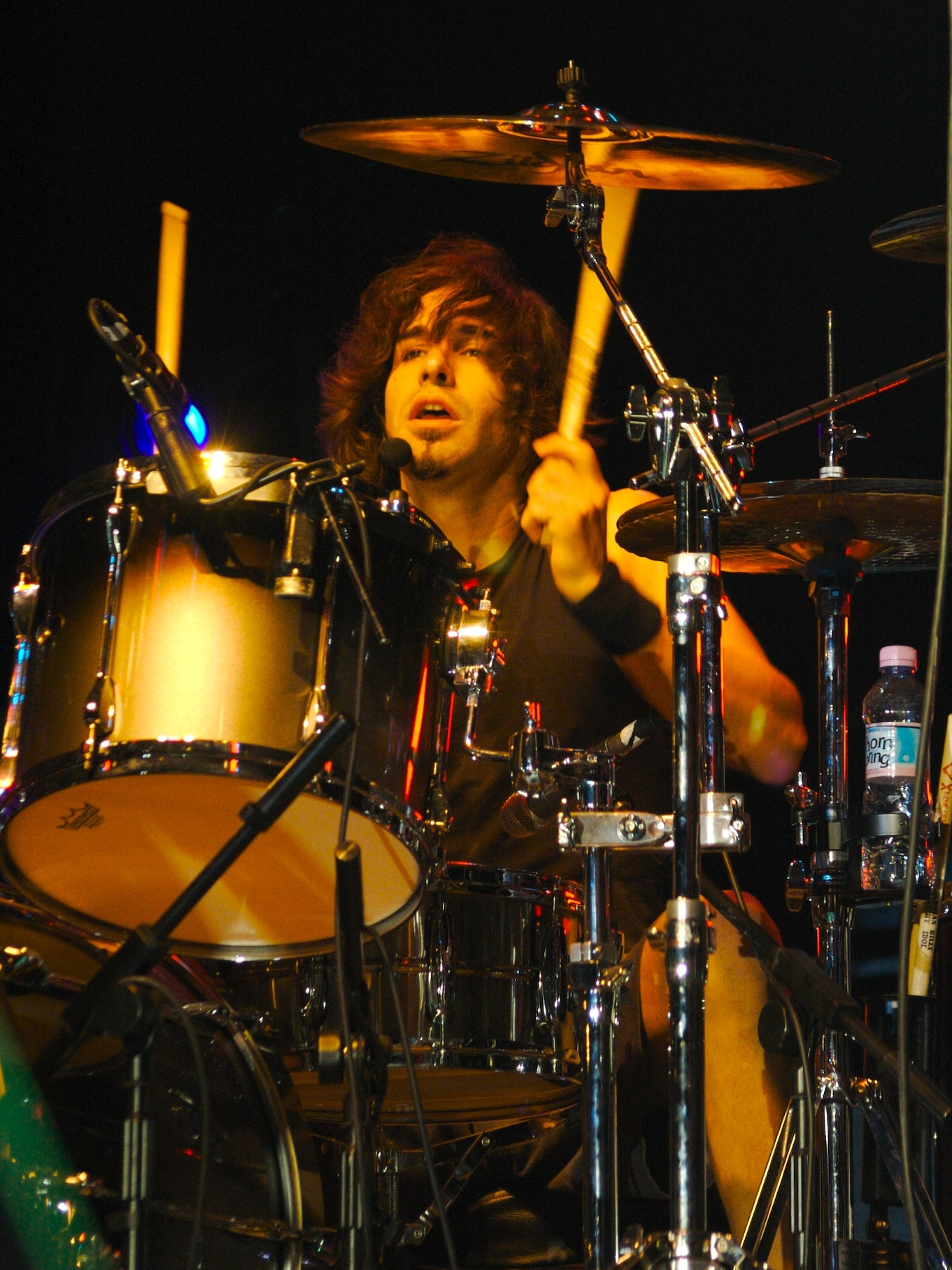
- Tichy performing in 2006

Background information
- Born: August 18, 1968 (age 58); Denville Township, New Jersey, U.S.
- Genres: Hard rock; heavy metal; new wave
- Occupation: Musician
- Instruments: Drums; guitar
- Years active: 1986–present
- Member of: Lynch Mob
- Formerly of: Randy Jackson's China Rain; Whitesnake; Billy Idol band; Foreigner; Pride & Glory; Slash's Snakepit; Operation: Mindcrime; The Dead Daisies
- Website: briantichy.com

Brian Tichy (/ˈtɪʃi/ TISH-ee; born August 18, 1968) is an American musician, best known as having been the drummer for Whitesnake, Billy Idol, Foreigner, Sass Jordan, and Ozzy Osbourne. He was the drummer of Whitesnake from 2010 to 2013. His surname means silent in Czech, Slovak and other Slavic languages. In 2015, he became a full-time member of Operation: Mindcrime and The Dead Daisies.

== Career ==
Tichy began playing drums at age eight and started playing guitar at age 12. His earliest influences include Kiss with Peter Criss as his main influence, Rush, Neil Peart, Led Zeppelin, Iron Maiden with Nicko McBrain, Aerosmith, AC/DC, and Van Halen

Since attending Berklee College of Music from 1986 until 1990, Tichy has toured/recorded with a multitude of artists including Billy Idol, Ozzy Osbourne, Seether, Velvet Revolver, Foreigner, Pride & Glory, Glenn Hughes, Sass Jordan, Slash's Snakepit, Randy Jackson's China Rain, Whitesnake and most recently The Dead Daisies.

=== Ball ===
While Tichy has primarily toured and recorded with others playing drums, he has fronted his own band, Ball, in which he sings and plays guitar. Due to the demise of his record label (Time Bomb Recordings), Ball's American Aggression CD never was formally released. Ball did manage to release a CD, The Grand Human Disaster Scenario (only in Japan) in May 1999. This CD contains what were essentially the demos that led to the record deal with Time Bomb at the end of 1999. His increasing role as co-songwriter with Billy Idol that started at the end of 2003 limited his time to focus on Ball.

=== Billy Idol ===
The Idol/Tichy writing partnership sparked the recording of Billy Idol's first CD since 1993. Devil's Playground (Sanctuary Records) was recorded in 2004 and contained 8 Idol/Tichy tracks. The CD was released in March 2005 and they toured for the remainder of the year.

While writing in 2006 for a follow-up Idol CD, Tichy and Idol recorded a Christmas album. This was done on their own, in Idol and Tichy's rehearsal studio with Tichy performing drums, guitar, and bass, as well as engineering and co-producing. Happy Holidays by Idol was released in November 2006 through Best Buy and in Europe.

=== Foreigner ===
Tichy joined Foreigner in 1998 and remained until 2000. He rejoined briefly in 2007 substituting for Jason Bonham. He then returned from 2008 until 2010, recording the album Can't Slow Down. He returned for one show in summer 2011, substituting for Mark Schulman, who had recently lost his father. Tichy rejoined Foreigner for the month of August 2012 for live performances, replacing the departed Schulman once again.

=== Other projects ===
Tichy filled in for Seether drummer John Humphrey in April 2007, toured with Foreigner through spring of 2009 (replacing Jason Bonham), and recently completed a multi-year involvement with Billy Idol. He has written music for television and film, and recorded with European female metal singer Marya Roxx. On September 25, 2010, Tichy organized, produced and played in the drummer tribute "Bonzo, The Groove Remains the Same", commemorating the 30th anniversary of the death of Led Zeppelin's John Bonham. In 2011, Tichy formed S.U.N. (Something Unto Nothing) as guitarist, with vocalist Sass Jordan, bassist Michael Devin, and drummer Tommy Stewart. In 2014, Tichy joined 'Sweet & Lynch', featuring Michael Sweet, George Lynch and James Lomenzo. In 2018 Tichy replaced Shane Gaalaas as the support drummer for Japanese rock band B'z, a band he had worked with previously as a session musician.

=== Whitesnake ===
Tichy was announced as the new drummer for Whitesnake on June 18, 2010. After several years of worldwide touring, Tichy quit Whitesnake on January 4, 2013, as he planned to focus more time on S.U.N.

== Speed bag ==
Tichy became a speed bag enthusiast while on tour with Foreigner and quickly got with some of the best speed baggers around to learn and increase his own skills. During the 2009–10 tour with Foreigner, Tichy hung several speed bag wall units inside the bands equipment truck and created the "Speed Bag Truck", hosting area speed bag enthusiasts from various areas when the band played in their town. Some of the best speed bag talent in the U.S. joined Tichy in the truck before concerts, punching away. Soon after, he began promoting his own punching skills via his YouTube videos for both physical fitness, and also as a musical instrument. He always planned to incorporate the speed bag into his drumkit, which was first unveiled during his appearance on "That Metal Show" on VH-1 classic, in April 2012, using a UBS1 freestanding floor frame from UBS1S Balazboxing. This is the first known inclusion of a speed bag by a professional drummer as a rhythm instrument in a major public appearance.

== Discography and touring ==
With Gene Simmons Band

- 2024: Touring South America & Europe

With Something Unto Nothing

- 2013

With The Dead Daisies

- 2014: Face I Love
- 2016: Make Some Noise
- 2022: Radiance

With Billy Idol

- 2005: Devil's Playground
- 2006: Happy Holidays Billy Idol Co-produced, recorded, engineered and mixed by Tichy and Idol.

All instruments performed by Tichy except keys by Derek Sherinian

- 2008: The Very Best of Billy Idol: Idolize Yourself - drums on 3 new tracks: 17-19

With Derek Sherinian

- 2003: Black Utopia
- 2004: Mythology
- 2006: Blood of the Snake
- 2009: Molecular Heinosity

With Kenny Wayne Shepherd

- 2004: The Place You're In

With Ball

- 1999: Grand Human Disaster Scenario (Japan only)
- 2000: American Aggression (Only available through BrianTichy.com)
- 2001: A Study in Persistence (Only available through BrianTichy.com)
- 2003: Bleed Defeat (Only available through BrianTichy.com)

With Gilby Clarke

- 1998: Rubber
- 2002: Swag
- 2007: Gilby Clarke; Best Of
- Various years of touring US

With Vinnie Moore

- 1996: Out of Nowhere
- Toured '91 and '92, opened 10 shows for Rush

With Ana Sidel

- 2005: "A Solas..."
- (8 tracks) recorded

With Nicklebag

- 1996: 12 Hits & a Bump
- 1997: Mas Feedback
- Japan and US touring

With Stevie Salas

- 1993: Presents: The Electric Pow Wow
- 1994: Back From The Living
- 1996: Anthology 1987–1994
- 1997: Le Bootleg (Live In Paris)
- 1997: Seoul Power
- 1998: The Sometimes Almost Never Was
- 2001: Shapeshifter (The Fall And Rise Of Stevie No Wonder)
- Various years of touring Japan and Europe

With Pride & Glory

- 1994: Pride & Glory
- Toured US, Europe, Japan

With B'z

- 2000: "Juice"
- 2000: Eleven
- 2003: Big Machine
- 2019: New Love
- 2022: Highway X

With TMG

- 2004: TMG I

With Sass Jordan

- 1994: Rats and Summer Tour

With Tommy Shaw and Jack Blades

- 2007: Shaw/Blades: "Influences" (8 tracks) recorded in 2004

With Jack Blades

- 2012: Rock 'N Roll Ride (4 tracks)

With Whitesnake

- 2011: Forevermore
- 2013: Made in Japan

For MasterSource Music Catalog

- Since 2000: Chief rock songwriter. MasterSource gets music placed in TV and movies. Tichy's include;

Law & Order, CSI: Crime Scene Investigation, The 40-Year-Old Virgin, Supergroup, The Osbournes, Punk'd, Pimp My Ride, and countless others.

Other projects

- 1991: Randy Jackson's China Rain – Bed of Nails
- 1992: RawHead – Flounder
- 1993: The Gallows Humor - "In Dying Need"
- 1994: The Gallows Humor - "What You Hear In The Dark" (Appears on 2 tracks: "Walking The Dogma" & "Mozart, Joyce and Sodomy")
- 1994: Guitar's Practicing Musicians, Vol. 3 (Pride & Glory – "The Wizard")
- 1997: Return of the Comet – Tribute to Ace Frehley; "Rip It Out", all instruments and vox...
- 1998: Taisuke – Heavy Pop
- 1999: Shameless – Backstreet Anthems
- 2000: Shameless – Queen 4 a Day
- 2000: Stevie Rachelle – Since Sixty-Six
- 2001: Sweet Emotion – The Songs of Aerosmith Tribute
- 2004: Richie Kotzen – Shapes of Things to Come (bonus track)
- 2005: Iron Maiden Tribute: Numbers from the Beast; "Run to the Hills" with Michael Schenker and Tony Franklin
- 2006: The Beatles Tribute: Butchering the Beatles; "Tomorrow Never Knows" with Billy idol, Steve Stevens and Blasko
- 2006: Marco Mendoza: Live for Tomorrow (3 tracks)
- 2007: Maarja: Produced by Kevin Shirley (Zeppelin, Maiden) featuring Derek Sherinian, Paul Crook and Scott Metaxes
- 2009: Ace Frehley: Anomaly – "Fox on the Run"
- September 25, 2010: Produced Bonzo, The Groove Remains the Same, first ever tribute to John Bonham, drummer of Led Zeppelin.
- 2011: Steven Tyler – "(It) Feels So Good"
- 2013: Steve Saluto: 12
- 2015 Lynch Mob- Rebel

Other artists Tichy has toured with:

- 1995: Slash's Snakepit (1995 World Tour)
- 1998–2000: Foreigner
- 2000: Ozzy Osbourne (Ozzfest 2000)
- 2001: Glenn Hughes
- 2005: Velvet Revolver (three-week fill-in for Matt Sorum due to hand injury)
- 2006–07: Foreigner (fill-in dates for current Foreigner drummer Jason Bonham)
- 2007: Seether (one-month fill-in for festivals)
- 2010: The Guess Who (fill-in)
- 2013: Geoff Tate (fill-in)
- 2014: Geoff Tate (fill-in)
