= Derek Sherinian =

American keyboardist (born 1966)

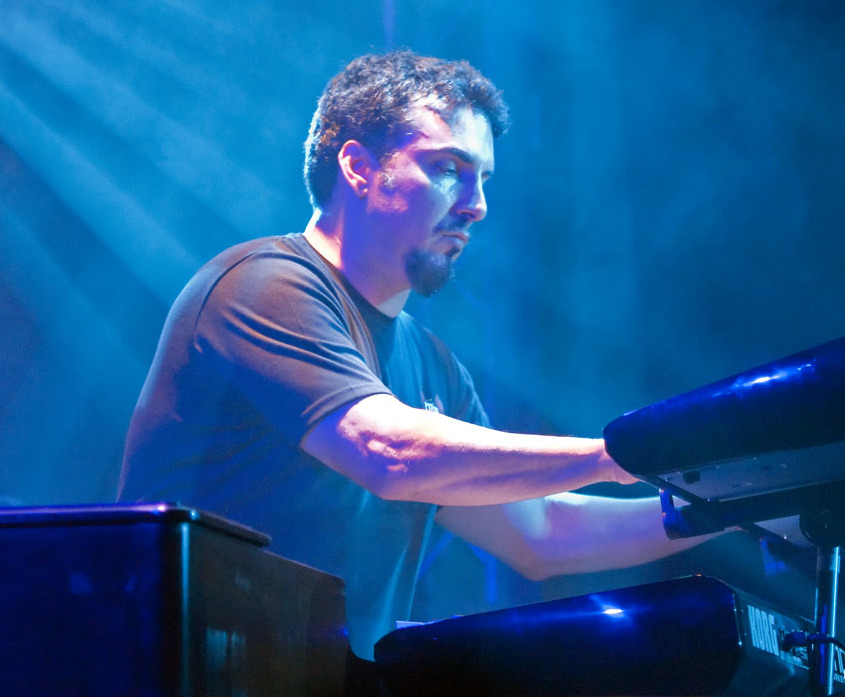
- Sherinian performing in 2012

Background information
- Born: August 25, 1966 (age 60); Laguna Beach, California, U.S.
- Genres: Hard rock; heavy metal; progressive metal; progressive rock; jazz fusion; neoclassical metal
- Occupations: Musician; composer; producer
- Instruments: Keyboards; synthesizers
- Years active: 1982–present
- Labels: Sony; Inside Out
- Member of: Black Country Communion
- Formerly of: Dream Theater; Planet X; KISS; Yngwie Malmsteen; Sons of Apollo
- Website: https://dereksherinian.com

Derek Sherinian (born August 25, 1966) is an American keyboardist who has toured and recorded for Alice Cooper, Billy Idol, and Joe Bonamassa, among others. He was also a member of Dream Theater from 1994 to 1999, is the founder of Planet X and also one of the founding members of Black Country Communion, Sons of Apollo, and Whom Gods Destroy. He has released nine solo albums that have featured a variety of prominent guest musicians, including guitarists Slash, Yngwie Malmsteen, Allan Holdsworth, Steve Lukather, Joe Bonamassa, Michael Schenker, Steve Vai and Al Di Meola, and drummer Simon Phillips.

Sherinian has distinguished himself by his versatility, and aggressive "guitaristic" approach to his signature keyboard style. MusicRadar.com declared, "A true shredder, his virtuoso playing has seen him dubbed the keyboard-playing version of Eddie Van Halen." In 2021, he was voted "Greatest Keyboardist Of The 21st Century", and #8 Greatest of All Time by MusicRadar.com. Sherinian was voted #1 Keyboardist in Japan's BURRN! Magazine in 2020, 2022, 2023, 2024.and 2025. In 2018, he was voted #9 Greatest Keyboardist Ever in Prog magazine. He has also appeared on the cover of numerous keyboard magazines around the world, including the November 2011 issue of Keyboard, which declared Sherinian a "Keyboard Hero for a New Generation". He has also been called the "King of the Keys" by Guitar World magazine and the "Caligula of Keyboards" by Alice Cooper. His musical influences include Elton John, Eddie Van Halen and Jan Hammer.

== Early life ==
Born in Laguna Beach, California, Sherinian is of Greek and Armenian descent. He began taking piano lessons at age five in Santa Cruz, California. After his junior year at Soquel High School, he received a scholarship to the Berklee College of Music in Boston where he attended with future Megadeth guitarist and Trans-Siberian Orchestra musical director Al Pitrelli, and Living Colour drummer Will Calhoun. He has since studied with other keyboardists, including Mitchel Forman, T Lavitz, Russell Ferrante,George Whitty, and Alex Alessandroni.

== Professional career ==
=== Buddy Miles ===
Sherinian's first professional gig after leaving Boston was in 1988 with ex-Jimi Hendrix Band of Gypsies drummer Buddy Miles touring the Chitlin' Circuit. Sherinian paid tribute to Miles covering his song "Them Changes" featuring Joe Bonamassa on his 2020 solo album "The Phoenix".

=== Alice Cooper ===
The success of Sherinian in the commercial world came in 1989 as he was hired by Alice Cooper for touring on the behalf of the platinum album named "Trash". He performed and recorded with Alice Cooper till 1998. Alice Cooper was impressed by the performance skills of Sherinian and called him "Caligula of the keyboards".

=== Dream Theater ===
In 1994, Sherinian replaced Kevin Moore in the progressive metal band Dream Theater, originally for the band's promotional tour for Awake. In February 1995, he was made a full-time member of the band. Dream Theater guitarist John Petrucci added "... Derek -considering the fact that he's heavily into guitarists and rock music, his history, and the range of all the great guitarists he's worked with —plays with a fire unheard of from most keyboardists." He recorded the albums A Change of Seasons (1995), Falling into Infinity (1997), and Once in a LIVEtime (1998) with Dream Theater before being replaced in January 1999 by Jordan Rudess due to creative differences and turmoil within the band. Sherinian reunited with Dream Theater for a one-off concert in 2004, which was recorded and released as When Dream and Day Reunite. The band's performance of "Metropolis Pt. 1" featured an extended improvisation between Sherinian, Rudess, and guitarist John Petrucci.

During the late 1990s, Sherinian released two albums with the progressive rock supergroup Platypus, which featured Dream Theater bassist John Myung, Dixie Dregs drummer Rod Morgenstein, and King's X guitarist Ty Tabor. The group released two albums, When Pus Comes to Shove (1998) and Ice Cycles (2000), before disbanding in 2000. In 2002, he was part of the band Jughead, which also included Tabor, bassist/vocalist Matt Bissonette and drummer Gregg Bissonette. In January 2012, Sherinian performed at two shows with instrumental supergroup Mike Portnoy, Billy Sheehan, and Tony MacAlpine (PSMS) for the Guitar Center Drum Off, and Sabian Live. In the fall of that year, PSMS began rehearsing for a tour and a video of their rehearsal was released on DVD as "InstruMENTAL Inspiration". They toured Europe and Asia concluding with a live DVD/CD "Live in Tokyo" released on September 24, 2013. In 2014, PSMS performed two songs at the TAMA 40th Anniversary Party at the NAMM Show on January 25, and also the Progressive Nation at Sea cruise on the Norwegian Pearl February 18–22, co-promoted by Sherinian and Portnoy.

=== Michael Schenker ===
In 2021, Michael Schenker invited Sherinian to guest on his album Immortal, on its opening song "Drilled To Kill". Schenker said of Sherinian, "Derek and myself trading solos, it sounds unexpected and beyond my expectation," Michael says. "Absolutely fantastic!" In 2022, Schenker returned the favor by guesting on Sherinian's Vortex album on the song "Die Kobra". In 2024, Sherinian appeared on Schenker's My Years With UFO album. In 2026, Schenker invited Sherinian to join his My Years With UFO Tour in Japan for three dates, including a sold-out Budokan show that is set to be released as a live DVD.

=== Yngwie Malmsteen ===
Sherinian joined Yngwie Malmsteen's band in August 2001 for a South American tour. After the tour, Sherinian and Malmsteen performed on each other's albums. Sherinian on Malmsteen's "Attack!", and Malmsteen performed on Sherinian's "Black Utopia" album. Sherinian joined Malmsteen again in 2006 for a North American Tour, and shows in Finland, and Russia. Again, they recorded for each other, Sherinian on Malmsteen's "Perpetual Burn", and Malmsteen on Sherinian's "Blood Of The Snake". In 2017, Malmsteen and Sherinian rejoined the Generation Axe Asia Tour, featuring Zakk Wylde, Steve Vai, Nuno Bettencourt, and Tosin Abasi.

=== Solo career ===
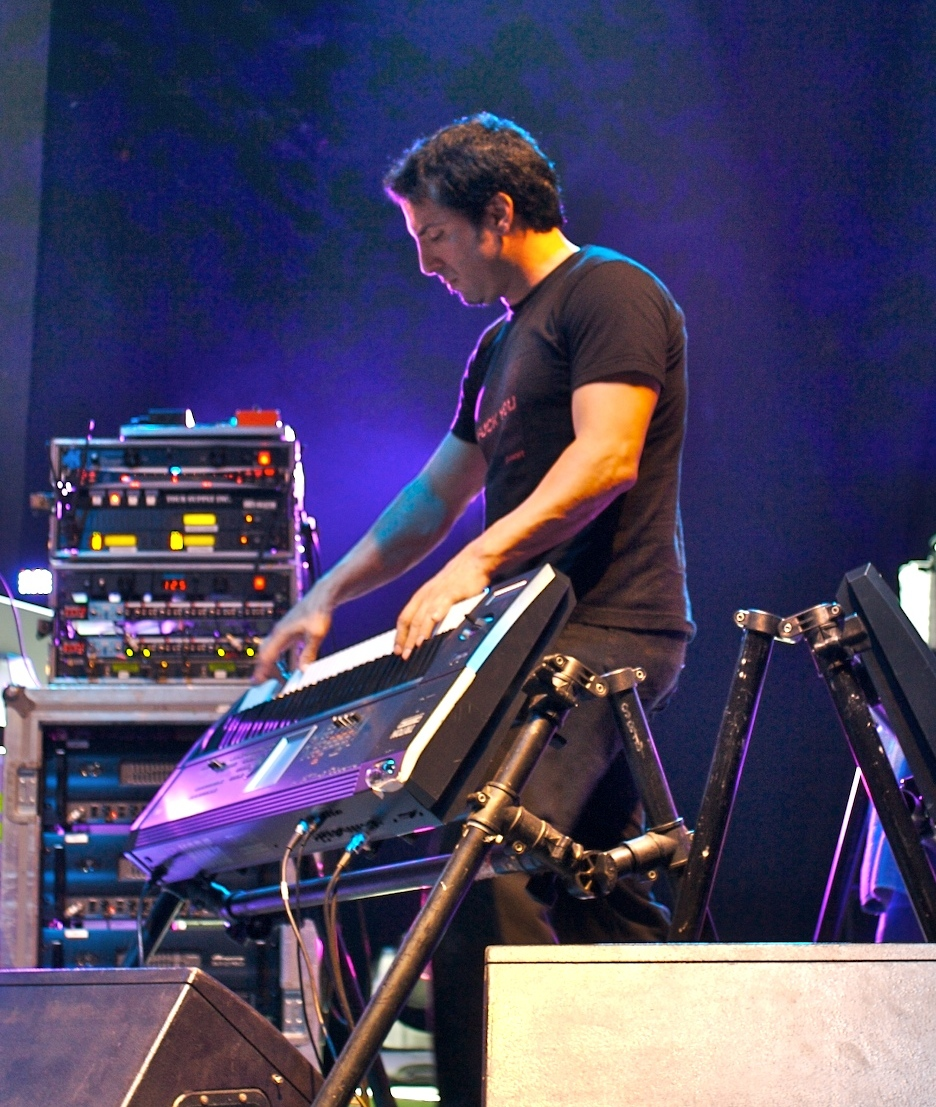
Sherinian performing in 2006

Since 1999, Sherinian has recorded nine solo albums, featuring performances by highly acclaimed musicians.

Sherinian's first solo album, Planet X (1999), written and recorded with Australian drummer Virgil Donati, led to the formation of a band of the same name (Planet X). Guitar virtuoso Tony MacAlpine was recruited to complete the band. Sherinian has stated that his intention when forming Planet X was to create a group of musicians that "played their instruments so fiercely that they would strike fear in the hearts of all musicians". In 2017, the short documentary "Return to Planet X" reflected on the making of this album.

In 2001, Sherinian teamed with drummer Simon Phillips and guitarists Steve Lukather and Zakk Wylde to record Inertia, followed by Black Utopia (2003). For Black Utopia, three new faces joined Sherinian's group: bassist Billy Sheehan, rock guitarist Yngwie Malmsteen, and jazz fusion guitarist Al Di Meola. With respect to this fusion-influenced lineup, Sherinian stated:

"I have always been a fan of jazz fusion, but from the perspective of a rock player crossing over to jazz, not vice versa. I think that is how Jeff Beck (who Sherinian stated he hopes to play with in numerous interviews) approached his classic instrumental records and I like to follow in that path."

Sherinian also called the album "a lot darker and heavier than [Inertia]".

Sherinian extended further into the fusion realm by collaborating with guitarist Allan Holdsworth and violinist Jerry Goodman (formerly of the Mahavishnu Orchestra) on Mythology (2004). In addition to another appearance by Phillips, other musicians on the recording were Zakk Wylde, John Sykes, Steve Stevens, and Tony Franklin. Holdsworth said of the session, "When Derek was finishing his album, he told me he’d love for me to play a guitar solo on it, so I did. I recorded a solo for him in the specific length that he requested, and he put it on that track [which also features Zakk Wylde]. People have told me they really like that guitar solo, but I haven’t heard it in years so I don’t remember it. [laughs]"

Since 2002, Sherinian has toured with several artists, including Billy Idol and Yngwie Malmsteen. Derek's fifth solo album, Blood of the Snake (2006), features contributions from Idol, as well as Guns N' Roses guitarist Slash, John Petrucci of Dream Theater, and Brian Tichy; Phillips, Franklin and Lukather make return appearances. A video for a cover version of Mungo Jerry's "In the Summertime" was released along with the album. Sherinian also worked with duduk master Djivan Gasparyan on the song "Prelude To Battle" on the release, written for his great-grandmother who survived the Armenian genocide. In 2009, Sherinian released his sixth solo album, Molecular Heinosity, again featuring Zakk Wylde, Tony Franklin and Brian Tichy. Later that year, Sherinian performed a one-off acoustic gig with Alice in Chains to launch their Black Gives Way to Blue album.

In September 2011, Sherinian released his seventh solo album titled Oceana, reuniting with Simon Phillips and Steve Lukather, and featuring a guest appearance from BCC bandmate Joe Bonamassa.

In 2019, Sherinian signed a new solo deal with Sony Music, and released The Phoenix September 18, 2020. In 2022, Sherinian released his 9th solo album Vortex, with Simon Phillips, Michael Schenker, Nuno Bettencourt, Steve Stevens and Mike Stern. Sherinian/Phillips "Live" album was released in August 25, 2023.

=== Black Country Communion ===
In 2009, Sherinian became a founding member of supergroup Black Country Communion with Glenn Hughes, Jason Bonham, and Joe Bonamassa, releasing their debut Black Country in 2010. In 2011, he performed on a second Black Country Communion record titled 2, followed by a nine-week tour of the United States and Europe. Sherinian recorded with Black Country Communion on their third studio release Afterglow. The band split up in September 2012 due to Bonamassa's solo touring schedule. Sherinian went on to join Bonamassa's solo band in July 2013 until December 2014. BCC reunited in 2017 to record their fourth album BCCIV. They released their 5th album BCCV in June 2024.

=== Whitesnake ===
Sherinian was hired by David Coverdale to replace the original keyboards on the previously released Whitesnake albums Slip of the Tongue and Restless Heart. Sherinian's performances resulted on the Red, White, and Blues Trilogy compilation records, containing the albums The Rock Album (2020), Love Songs (2020), The Blues Album (2021), Greatest Hits (2022) and The Purple Album: Special Gold Edition (2023 re-issue). Whitesnake singer David Coverdale explained, "One of the things that's very noticeable; it's all '80s keyboards, which I can't stand. They totally date it. Thank god, I found Derek Sherinian, who — and I know he won't mind me saying this — Derek's like the illegitimate son of Jon Lord. He just played his ass off for us, and you can hear it."

In April 2004, Sherinian was invited by ex-Whitesnake guitarist John Sykes to play three shows in Japan with Marco Mendoza bass, Tommy Aldridge on drums. The live album John Sykes (2004) "Bad Boy Live" was from this tour. Sykes later guested on the song "God of War" with Zakk Wylde on Sherinian's (2004) "Mythology" record.

=== Sons of Apollo ===
In August 2017, he and Mike Portnoy joined forces to form a progressive metal supergroup named Sons of Apollo and also featuring Billy Sheehan, vocalist Jeff Scott Soto and guitarist Ron "Bumblefoot" Thal. Sons of Apollo released their debut album Psychotic Symphony on October 21, 2017, followed by a world tour of 83 shows in 23 countries. Sons of Apollo released their second album, "MMXX", in January 2020 co-produced once again by Sherinian and Mike Portnoy.

=== Whom Gods Destroy ===
In December 2023, Sherinian and guitarist Ron "Bumblefoot" Thal unveiled a new progressive metal project named Whom Gods Destroy. They announced Dino Jelusick on vocal duties, along with Yas Nomura on bass, and Bruno Valverde as their drummer. Their debut album "Insanium" was released March 2024.

=== Guest live appearances ===
==== Kiss ====
On the recommendation of Eric Singer, Sherinian was hired to play off-stage keyboards on Kiss' Revenge Tour. Sherinian is on the Alive III live album and also guested with Kiss on the song "Do You Remember Rock & Roll Radio?" on the Ramones tribute album We're a Happy Family, and Alive IV.

==== Alice in Chains ====
On July 14, 2009, Sherinian performed a one-off acoustic gig at Ricardo Montalbán Theatre in Hollywood with Alice in Chains to launch their Black Gives Way to Blue album.

==== Dorians ====
On September 10, 2012, Sherinian was special guest to the Armenian band Dorians performing a concert in Yerevan and the first rock concert ever in Artsakh. On September 13, 2012 Glenn Hughes and Sherinian met Bako Sahakyan, the president of de facto independent Nagorno-Karabakh Republic and organized a concert there. After his visit to Artsakh, Sherinian was placed on the Azerbaijan black list due to conflict between the two countries.

==== Black Label Society ====
On March 6, 2013, Sherinian was a special guest keyboardist with Black Label Society for their Unblackened acoustic set at the Club Nokia in Los Angeles. The performance aired live on AXS TV, and was released in September 2013 on CD/DVD/Blu-ray formats. Zakk Wylde officially "patched" Sherinian in as president of the Black Label Society Burbank Chapter.

==== Tony MacAlpine Benefit ====
On December 12, 2015, Sherinian co-organized and participated in the Tony MacAlpine Benefit Concert at the Wiltern Theater in L.A. backing up Zakk Wylde along with Mike Portnoy and Billy Sheehan.

==== Joe Satriani ====
In August 2023, guitarist Joe Satriani invited Derek to play four East Coast concerts with him, which included drummer Kenny Aronoff on drums.

==== Generation Axe ====
Sherinian was personally invited by guitarists Steve Vai, and Yngwie Malmsteen to join the Generation Axe Asia / A Night of Guitars Tour also featuring Zakk Wylde, Nuno Bettencourt, and Tosin Abasi.

== Influences and acclaim from other artists ==
In a 2000 interview, Sherinian cited his early keyboard influences as being Jan Hammer (Mahavishnu Orchestra), Jon Lord (Deep Purple), Keith Emerson (Emerson, Lake & Palmer and The Nice), Rick Wakeman (Yes), and Elton John. Other influences include guitarists Allan Holdsworth, Jeff Beck, and Eddie Van Halen. Sherinian said, "When it comes to soloing, I have always been influenced and inspired by the great guitarists, specifically Edward Van Halen, Allan Holdsworth, Yngwie Malmsteen, Randy Rhoads, Jeff Beck, Michael Schenker. You can hear elements of all of these players in my DNA. I have managed to take my favorite qualities of all these great players, and process through my instrument, creating a totally unique signature style." Sherinian enjoys co-writing material with fellow musicians, and often finds that he writes better material with drummers. Sherinian cites Van Halen's guitar playing as having a direct influence on his aggressive unique approach to keyboards in terms of technique as well as tone; his unique signature lead patches contain numerous elements of guitar sounds such as distortion, harmonics, and palm-muting, eventually leading to playing a gig with Eddie for a party at Van Halen's home in 2006, of which Sherinian said "It was the highlight of my career, it was completely surreal." Sherinian's work with noted Toto guitarist Steve Lukather on the 2001 solo CD Inertia was cited by Lukather as "probably my best recorded work in my whole career. Great record! I'm very proud of it!".

Sherinian's collaborations with top musicians were featured in a 2007 article in Guitar World magazine, where guitarist Zakk Wylde offered, "People want to play with him because he's that good. He can play everything from the easiest licks on a piano to the most complex Beethoven sonatas with ease." Sherinian explains that he enlists a variety of guitarists because he "[does not] think there is one guitarist who can cover all the styles featured on [the] albums." Sherinian often tailors songs for specific guitarists, such as Holdsworth and Wylde for "Day of the Dead" (off Mythology); in this respect, he seeks to take certain aspects of genres and make them "collide in an eloquent way".

== Equipment ==
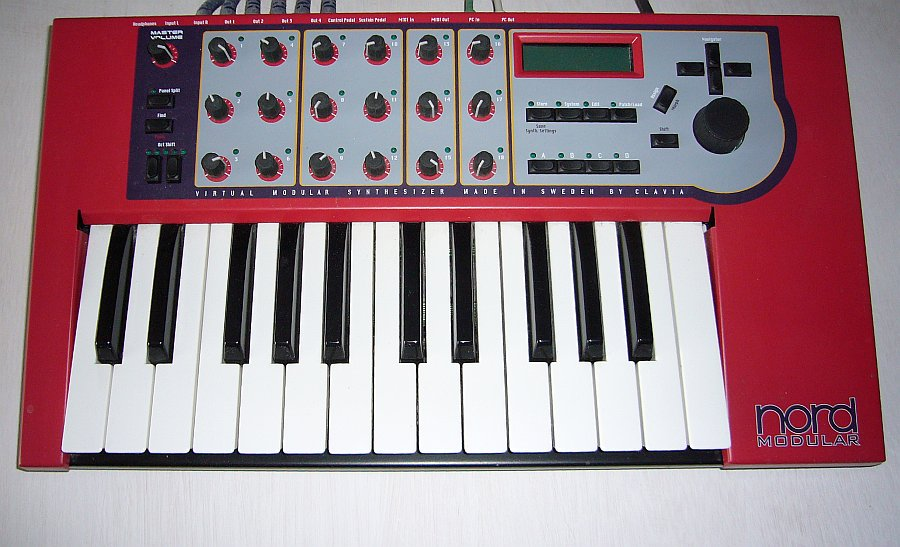
A Clavia Nord Modular

Sherinian uses vintage instruments, primarily the Hammond organ, Moog, Rhodes, and Nord Lead 3 mixed in with some modern sounds. Sherinian was presented the G2 Modular synth serial number 001 by Clavia representative Bengt Lilja in January 2004. As a Korg endorsee, Sherinian was one of the first artists to adopt the Korg Trinity keyboard series in 1996. In collaboration with KORG sound designer Jack Hotop, they created Sherinian's signature "guitaristic" lead sound (the "Monster Lead", made famous on the Dream Theater album "Falling into Infinity") on the Trinity, as well as other, more "modern" and "aggressive" keyboard patches, owing to his fondness of guitar tones and technique. He also uses the Hammond B3 organ; he thinks that "every rock keyboardist should have a B3 and overdriven Leslie as part of their sound."

Sherinian is also known for being one of the first keyboardists to use vertical keyboard stands, influencing a new generation of keyboardists.

== Selected discography ==
Project	Album	Year
Solo	Planet X	1999
Solo	Inertia	2001
Solo	Black Utopia	2003
Solo	Mythology	2004
Solo	Blood of the Snake	2006
Solo	Molecular Heinosity	2009
Solo	Oceana	2011
Solo	The Phoenix	2020
Solo	Vortex	2022
Dream Theater	A Change of Seasons (EP)	1995
Dream Theater	Falling into Infinity	1997
Dream Theater	Once in a LIVEtime (CD)	1998
Dream Theater	5 Years in a Livetime (VHS/DVD)	1998
Planet X	Universe	2000
Planet X	Live from Oz	2002
Planet X	MoonBabies	2002
Planet X	Quantum	2007
Black Country Communion	Black Country	2010
Black Country Communion	2	2011
Black Country Communion	Afterglow	2012
Black Country Communion	BCCIV	2017
Black Country Communion	BCCV	2024
Sons of Apollo	Psychotic Symphony	2017
Sons of Apollo	Live with the Plovdiv Psychotic Symphony	2019
Sons of Apollo	MMXX	2020
Whitesnake	The Rock Album	2020
Whitesnake	Love Songs	2020
Michael Schenker Group	Immortal	2021
Whom Gods Destroy	Insanium	2024
Alice Cooper	The Last Temptation	1994
Alice Cooper	Classicks	1995
Yngwie Malmsteen	Attack!!	2002
Yngwie Malmsteen	Perpetual Flame	2008
Billy Idol	Devil's Playground	2005
Billy Idol	The Very Best of Billy Idol: Idolize Yourself	2008

== Movie appearances ==
- 1992: Wayne's World – as himself, as part of Alice Cooper
