= Mythology (Derek Sherinian album) =

Studio album by Derek Sherinian
- Released: November 9, 2004
- Genre: Instrumental rock, progressive metal
- Length: 45:52
- Label: Inside Out Music
- Producer: Derek Sherinian

Derek Sherinian chronology
Black Utopia (2003)	Mythology (2004)	Blood of the Snake (2006)

Professional ratings
Review scores
Source	Rating
PiercingMetal	3.5/5 stars

Mythology is the fourth solo album by keyboard player Derek Sherinian. Sherinian again draws upon some of the greatest talent from the worlds of rock and jazz music. Among the artists appearing on Mythology are jazz fusion player Allan Holdsworth (U.K., Soft Machine, Level 42), Steve Lukather (Toto), Simon Phillips (Toto, Jeff Beck, The Who), Zakk Wylde (Ozzy Osbourne, Black Label Society), Grammy award winner Steve Stevens (Billy Idol), Jerry Goodman (Mahavishnu Orchestra, Dixie Dregs), and a very rare guest appearance from guitarist John Sykes (Whitesnake, Thin Lizzy, Blue Murder).

== Track listing ==
1. "Day of the Dead" – 8:20 (Sherinian/Tichy)
2. "Alpha Burst" – 4:55 (Stevens)
3. "God of War" – 5:16 (Sherinian/Tichy)
4. "El flamingo suave" – 4:54 (Sherinian/Stevens)
5. "Goin' to Church" – 4:46 (Sherinian)
6. "One Way or the Other" – 4:56 (Goodman/Phillips/Sherinian)
7. "Trojan Horse" – 3:55 (Sherinian/Tichy)
8. "A View from the Sky" – 4:55 (Stevens)
9. "The River Song" – 3:51 (Sherinian/Wylde)

== Musicians ==
- Derek Sherinian - keyboards
- Zakk Wylde - guitar (tracks 1, 3 and 9), vocals (track 9)
- Steve Stevens - guitar (tracks 2, 4, and 8)
- Allan Holdsworth - guitar (tracks 1 and 6)
- John Sykes - guitar (track 3)
- Steve Lukather - guitar (track 5)
- Tony Franklin - bass guitar (tracks 1, 2, 5 and 8)
- Marco Mendoza - bass guitar (tracks 3, 4, 7 and 9)
- Rufus Philpot - bass guitar (track 6)
- Jerry Goodman - violin (tracks 1 and 6)
- Simon Phillips - drums (tracks 2, 4–6, 8 and 9)
- Brian Tichy - drums (tracks 1, 3, 7 and 9), additional guitars (tracks 1, 3 and 7)
- Mike Shapiro - percussion
