= Book of Shadows (album) =

Studio album by Zakk Wylde
- Released: June 18, 1996
- Recorded: 1996
- Genre: Southern rock, folk rock
- Length: 51:25
- Label: Geffen (original release); Spitfire (reissue)
- Producer: Ron & Howard Albert

Zakk Wylde chronology
Book of Shadows (1996)	Book of Shadows II (2016)

Singles from Book of Shadows
- 1. "Way Beyond Empty" Released: October 1996

Professional ratings
Review scores
Source	Rating
AllMusic	3/5 stars

Book of Shadows is the first solo studio album by American heavy metal guitarist Zakk Wylde. The album was first released in 1996 by Geffen Records and was reissued by Spitfire in 1999 with the bonus disc containing "Evil Ways" (the Japanese bonus track from the album's original release), "The Color Green", and "Peddlers of Death" (an acoustic version of a track that features on Black Label Society's Sonic Brew).

Unlike his work with Ozzy Osbourne and Black Label Society, here Zakk Wylde shows a different side to his music; an introspective and mostly acoustic style recalling many of the lighter moments from his previous project, Pride & Glory, as well as classic folk rock artists such as Neil Young.

Promotional singles were released for "Between Heaven and Hell" and "Way Beyond Empty", the latter of which also had an accompanying music video.

"Throwin' It All Away" was written about the death of Shannon Hoon from the band Blind Melon. Hoon and Wylde had lived together and became close friends a few months before he died of a drug overdose.

In 2025, Yarden Bibas dedicated the song "I Thank You Child" to his children, Ariel and Kfir, at their funeral, causing the song to top the Spotify charts in Israel.

== Track listing ==
All songs written and composed by Zakk Wylde.

Disc one

1. "Between Heaven and Hell" – 3:26
2. "Sold My Soul" – 4:52
3. "Road Back Home" – 5:48
4. "Way Beyond Empty" – 5:25
5. "Throwin' It All Away" – 5:47
6. "What You're Look'n For" – 5:31
7. "Dead as Yesterday" – 2:51
8. "Too Numb to Cry" – 2:23
9. "The Things You Do" – 4:11
10. "1,000,000 Miles Away" – 6:29
11. "I Thank You Child" – 4:41

Disc two

1. "Evil Ways" – 4:13 (original Japanese bonus track)
2. "The Color Green" – 3:05
3. "Peddlers of Death" – 5:51 (later re-arranged and re-recorded with Black Label Society for the Sonic Brew album)

== Personnel ==
- Zakk Wylde – vocals, guitars, piano, keyboards, harmonica, bass on "1,000,000 Miles Away"
- Joe Vitale – drums, keyboards, piano on "I Thank You Child"
- James LoMenzo – bass
- John Sambataro – additional backing vocals on "Way Beyond Empty"

Production

- Produced and recorded by Ron Albert and Howard Albert
- Mixed by Bob Clearmountain, assisted by Ryan Freeland
- Strings arranged and conducted by Mike Lewis
- Recording engineers: Greg Goldman, Ron Albert, Howard Albert, Eric Gobel, Frank Cesarano
- Mastered by David J. Donnelly

Management

- Personal manager: Gerry Tolman
