= Zakk Wylde =

American rock musician (born 1967)

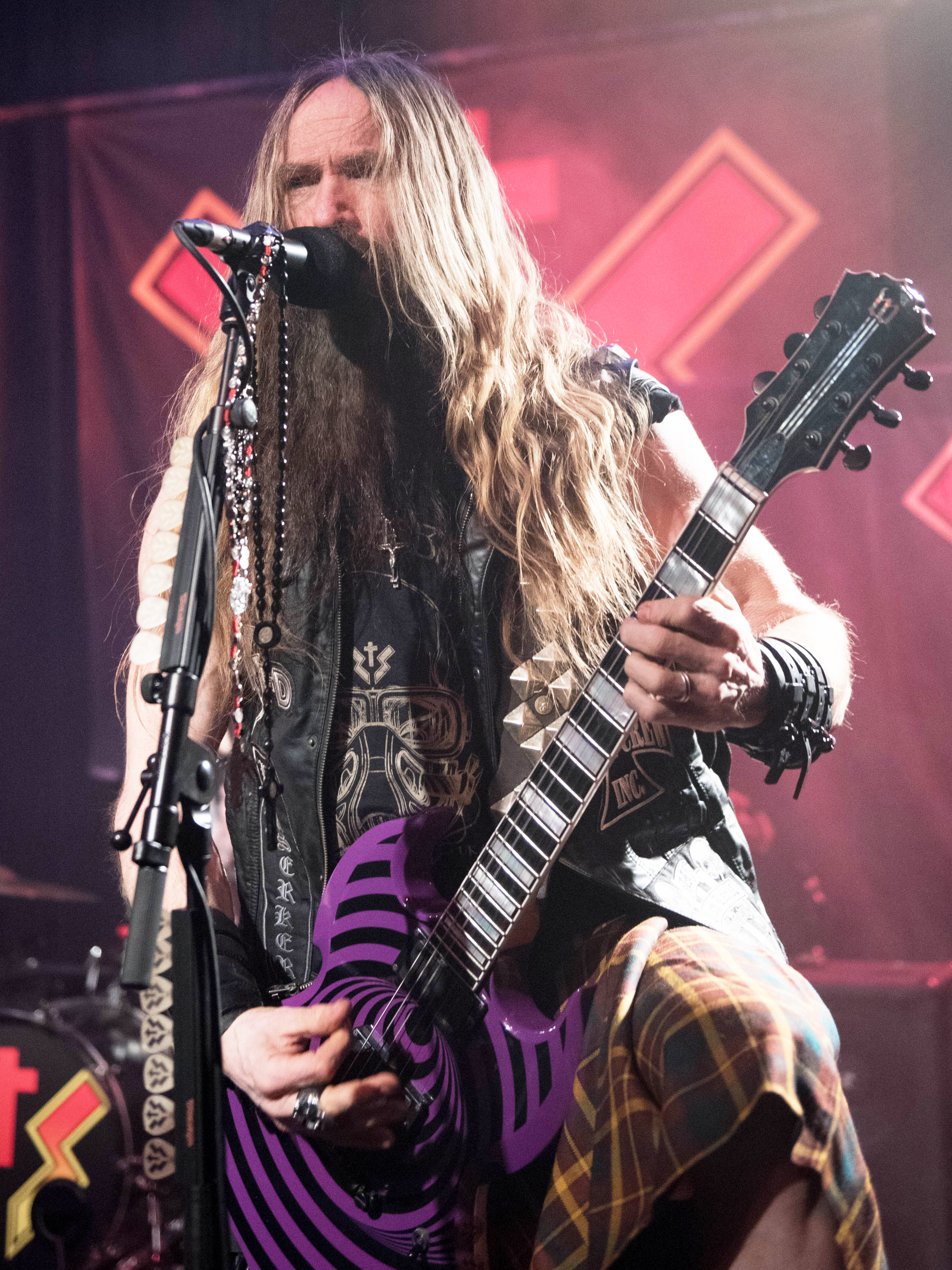
- Wylde in 2025

Background information
- Born: Jeffrey Phillip Wielandt; January 14, 1967 (age 59); Bayonne, New Jersey, U.S.
- Origin: Jackson, New Jersey, U.S.
- Genres: Heavy metal; hard rock; Southern metal; groove metal
- Occupations: Musician; singer; songwriter; record producer
- Instruments: Guitar; vocals; piano
- Years active: 1987–present
- Member of: Black Label Society; Zakk Sabbath; Generation Axe; Pantera (touring member)
- Formerly of: Ozzy Osbourne; Pride & Glory
- Website: zakkwylde.com

Zachary Phillip Wylde (born Jeffrey Phillip Wielandt; January 14, 1967) is an American musician. He is best known as the lead guitarist for Ozzy Osbourne and as the founder, lead guitarist, lead singer, songwriter and producer of the heavy metal band Black Label Society.

Wylde's signature bulls-eye design appears on many of his guitars. He was also the lead guitarist and vocalist of Pride & Glory, who released one self-titled album in 1994 before disbanding. As a solo artist, he released the albums Book of Shadows and Book of Shadows II. Wylde joined the reunited Pantera in 2022 as a touring guitarist.

== Early life ==
Zachary Phillip Wylde was born Jeffrey Phillip Wielandt in Bayonne, New Jersey, on January 14, 1967. He is of Irish descent. He grew up in Jackson, New Jersey, where he attended Jackson Memorial High School, graduating in 1985. At the age of 14, he worked at Silverton Music in Silverton, New Jersey. He cited "Rocket Man" by Elton John as the song that made him passionate for music. He started playing guitar at the age of eight, but did not become serious about it until his early teenage years. He has stated that he often played the guitar almost non-stop between coming home from school and leaving for school the next morning, then would be completely exhausted during school the next day. His earliest influences as a guitarist were Tony Iommi, Jimmy Page, Jimi Hendrix and later he expanded his tastes listening to Frank Marino, Randy Rhoads, Eddie Van Halen, Joe Pass, Alex Lifeson, Pat Martino, Al Di Meola, John McLaughlin, Paco de Lucía.

== Career ==
=== Early career ===
Wylde played locally with his first band Stone Henge, then later with local New Jersey band Zyris.

=== Ozzy Osbourne (1987–1995, 2001–2009, 2017–2025) ===
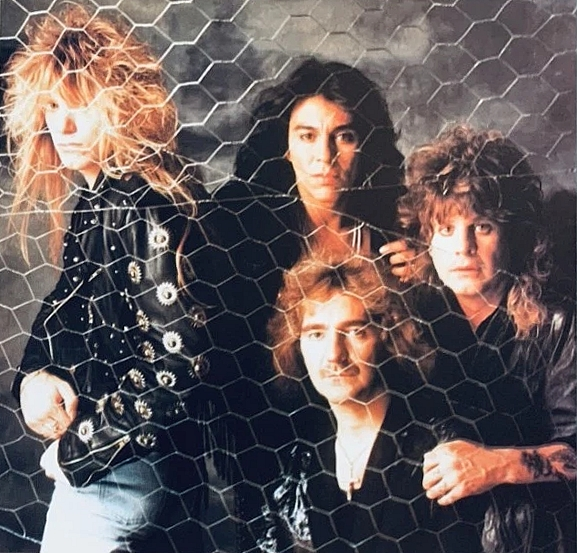
Wylde (left) with the Ozzy Osbourne band in 1988

In 1987, Wylde auditioned for Ozzy Osbourne after listening to The Howard Stern Show and learning that Osbourne was looking for a new lead guitarist. Wylde was hired to replace Jake E. Lee, who was fired by Osbourne’s manager Sharon Osbourne. He subsequently toured with Osbourne and played on No Rest for the Wicked (1988), No More Tears (1991), and Ozzmosis (1995) as a co-writer.

Wylde was replaced by ex-Lizzy Borden guitarist Joe Holmes in 1995 until Wylde's return in 2001. Although not credited for songwriting, Wylde recorded Down to Earth and appeared on the supporting tour. After auditioning different guitarists in 2004 and 2005, Ozzy Osbourne announced Zakk Wylde as the official guitarist for his album Black Rain, which was released in 2007 and also accompanied by a tour.

Wylde rejoined Ozzy Osbourne's band once again for a select number of dates during Osbourne's 2017 summer tour, and then performed on the No More Tours II tour before the remaining shows were postponed and eventually canceled. On September 8, 2022, he again joined Osbourne onstage at the SoFi Stadium along with Andrew Watt to perform "Crazy Train" and the title track for Osbourne's album "Patient Number 9" at the NFL's season opening during half-time. The following day, Patient Number 9 was released featuring Wylde playing guitar on 4 tracks.

On October 19, 2024, Wylde performed on stage at Rocket Mortgage FieldHouse during the 2024 Rock and Roll Hall of Fame induction ceremony for Osbourne, playing Mama, I'm Coming Home and No More Tears.

=== Pride & Glory (1991–1994) ===
Formed in 1991 during what was then billed as Ozzy Osbourne's farewell tour following the 1991 No More Tears album, Wylde recruited the former White Lion rhythm section of bassist James LoMenzo and drummer Greg D'Angelo, and originally wanted to name the Southern rock-inspired project 'Lynyrd Skynhead'. This lineup recorded two songs, an instrumental entitled "Farm Fiddlin" for a 1991 compilation album entitled The Guitars That Rule the World, and a cover of the blues-standard "Baby, Please Don't Go" for the 1992 L.A. Blues Authority Vol. 1 compilation.

By early 1994, the band had changed their name to 'Pride & Glory', with D'Angelo departing and being replaced by Brian Tichy. That year, Pride & Glory released their only album via Geffen Records and performed as a main-stage act at the Donington Monsters of Rock Festival in England in June of that year. In November 1994, LoMenzo left after a tour of Japan, three days before Pride & Glory were scheduled to begin a US Tour. Scrambling, Wylde quickly managed to find a replacement in his long-time friend, John DeServio, who grew up with Wylde in New Jersey. Pride & Glory played their final show on December 10, 1994, in Los Angeles.

On January 31, 1998, the lineup of Wylde, LoMenzo, and Tichy reunited for a one-off reunion show at the Whisky a Go Go in Hollywood.

=== Solo albums (1996, 2016) ===
Following the demise of Wylde's Pride & Glory band, he recorded Book of Shadows in 1996 as a solo album to fulfill his contract with record label Geffen Records. Wylde wrote the second installment of Book of Shadows in between stints on the road, which was released 20 years after the first album on April 16, 2016, with eOne.

=== Black Label Society (1998–present) ===
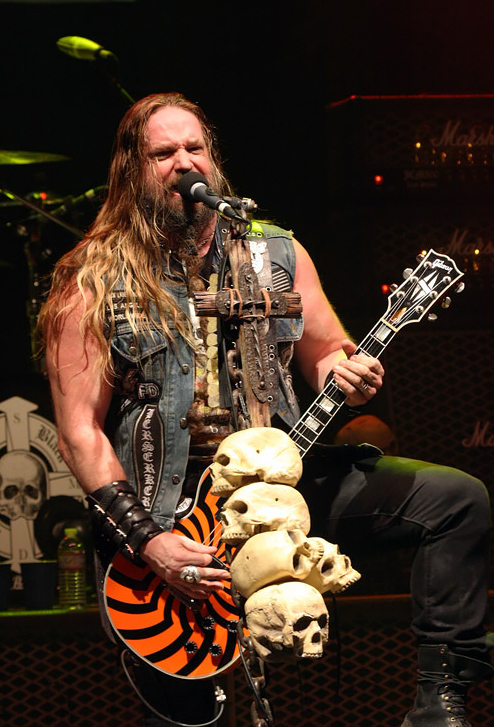
Wylde in 2010

In 1998, after limited commercial success with Book of Shadows, Wylde and drummer Phil Ondich recorded what became Black Label Society's debut album Sonic Brew with Wylde playing lead guitar, rhythm and bass. Nick Catanese previously toured as a rhythm guitarist for the Book of Shadows tour and eventually joined Black Label Society before being replaced by Dario Lorina in 2013. John DeServio, who was a friend of Zakk's and worked as a temporary replacement in Pride & Glory, played bass for the first Black Label Society tour. DeServio became a permanent member of the band in 2005. Zakk Wylde has since released 11 studio albums, 3 live albums, and 6 compilation albums with Black Label Society.

Black Label Society headlined the second stage at the 2006 Ozzfest, with Wylde playing double duty with Ozzy Osbourne on certain dates. He and the band also joined Osbourne for the Ozzy and Friends Tour in replacement of the Black Sabbath tour scheduled for the summer of 2012, playing a range of European dates including Graspop Metal Meeting in Belgium.

=== Zakk Sabbath (2014–present) ===
Since 2014, Wylde has led a Black Sabbath cover band called 'Zakk Sabbath', handling guitar and vocal duties, joined by Rob "Blasko" Nicholson on bass and Joey Castillo (Danzig, Queens of the Stone Age) on drums, who replaced original drummer John Tempesta. JP Gaster (Clutch) occupied the drummer's seat in between, in September 2017. The band tours intermittently and has released the studio albums Vertigo in 2020, followed by Doomed Forever Forever Doomed in 2024.

=== Pantera (2022–present) ===
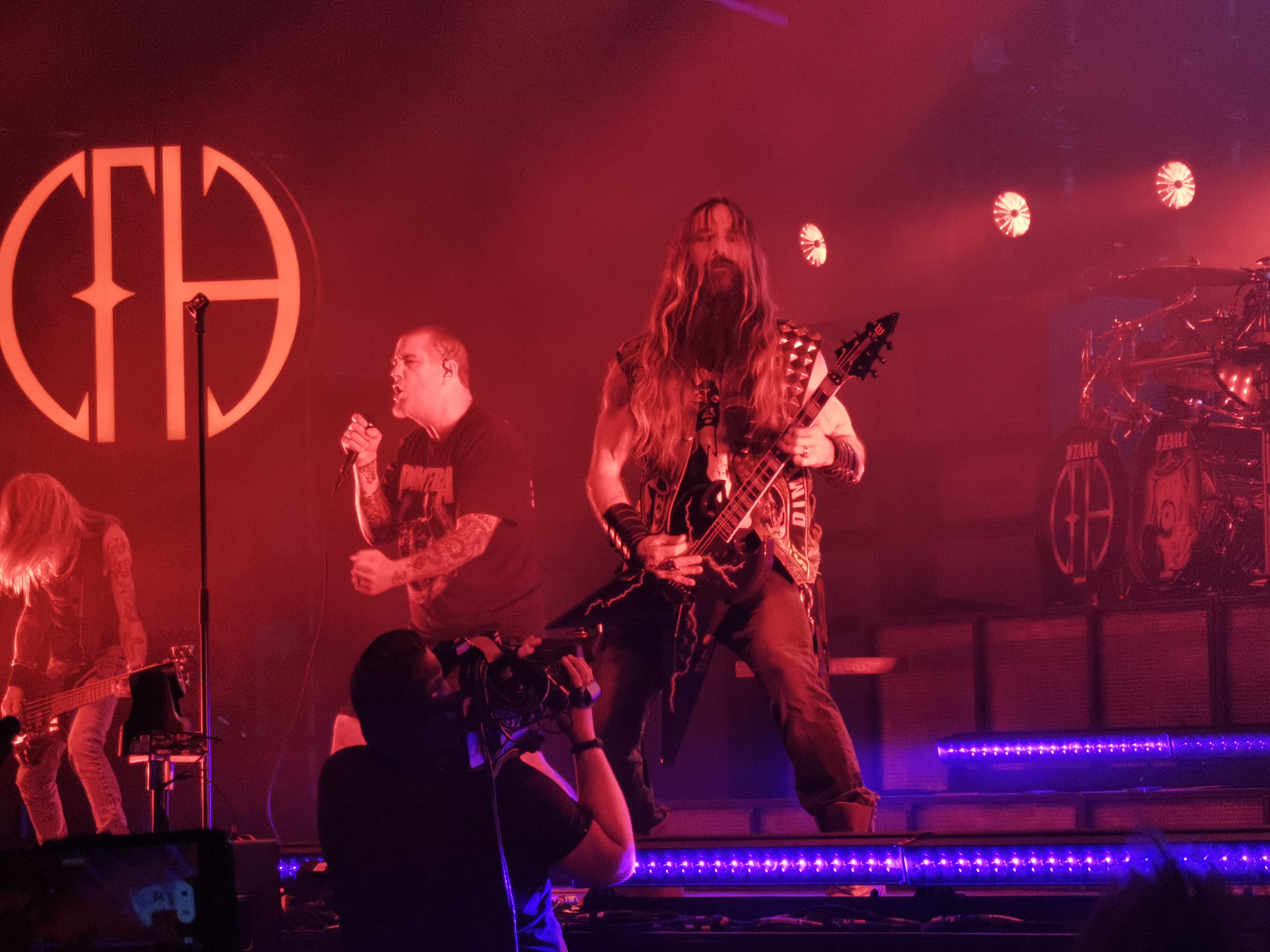
Wylde (center, with guitar) performing with Pantera in 2023

On July 14, 2022, it was announced that Wylde had joined the reunited band Pantera to tour as a fill-in for original guitarist Dimebag Darrell who died in 2004. The new lineup featuring Wylde, Phil Anselmo, Rex Brown and Charlie Benante (replacing original drummer Vinnie Paul) debuted on the first night of the Heaven & Hell Metal Fest in Toluca, Mexico on December 2, 2022. Pantera then co-headlined Mexico's Monterrey Metal Fest with Judas Priest, and also performed at Knotfest in Chile, Brazil and Colombia. The band embarked on a full-scale tour of Europe in May and June 2023, and supported Metallica on selected North American dates of their 2023–2024 M72 World Tour. On June 15, 2024, Pantera headlined the Opus Stage at UK's Download Festival, their first UK appearance in 20 years.

=== Other work ===
Zakk Wylde joined a rock/heavy metal supergroup called 'Generation Axe', formed by Steve Vai. The group also includes guitarists Nuno Bettencourt (of Extreme), Yngwie Malmsteen, Tosin Abasi, and has completed several tours from 2016 to 2019. Select performances from a 2017 show in Beijing, China were released as a live album titled Generation Axe – The Guitars That Destroyed the World: Live In China. In 2020, Wylde, along with Generation Axe, were joined by Brian May of the band Queen for a six-guitar performance of Queen's "Bohemian Rhapsody" as part of AXS TV's 'At Home And Social With Nuno Bettencourt & Friends' special. The track was compiled of recordings from the musicians in their homes during the COVID-19 pandemic.

== Personal life ==
Wylde and his wife Barbaranne have four children, one of which to whom Ozzy Osbourne was a godfather. Wylde was a close friend of fellow guitarist "Dimebag" Darrell Abbott and dedicated the song "In This River" to Abbott after he was murdered onstage in 2004.

Wylde is a Catholic who has described himself as a "Soldier of Christ".

In August 2009, Wylde was hospitalized due to blood clots and was subsequently forced to cancel his tour with Mudvayne and Static-X. After his hospitalization, he stopped drinking alcohol.

As of 2011, Wylde has partnered with Blair's Sauces and Snacks to produce 'Berserker Hot Sauce' and several other variations. He also promotes 'Death Wish Coffee' via his Instagram page, as they have used his name in marketing their line "Odinforce Blend".

== Equipment ==
Wylde gravitated toward a particular Les Paul guitar, a bullseye-painted 1981 Gibson Les Paul Custom purchased from one of the owners of Metaltronix Amplification. Metaltronix was building a one-off live rig for Wylde that was designed around one of the owner's guitars, a creamy white Les Paul Custom with EMG pickups, which would later become known as "The Grail". Originally intended to look like the spiral from the Alfred Hitchcock movie Vertigo, it returned from a paint shop painted incorrectly and Wylde liked the result. Wylde lost the guitar in 2000 after it fell from the back of a truck transporting equipment as he was traveling between gigs in Texas. Rewards were offered to anyone that had information about the guitar. Wylde and The Grail were reunited three years later when a fan bought it at a Dallas pawn shop and saw the initials "Z.W." carved into the humbucker pickups backs. He contacted Wylde's former webmaster Randy Canis to arrange its return to Wylde. Grateful, Wylde gave the fan his signature model in exchange.

Other signature Les Pauls of Wylde's include a red flame-maple bulls-eye model, a black and antique-white bulls-eye model, an orange "buzz-saw" model, the pattern on which was inspired by a design on a Zippo lighter, and a "camo" bulls-eye model with mother of pearl neck inlays and a green camouflage paint scheme.

Another one of Wylde's favorite stage guitars is a GMW RR-V, a model that is famously known as the "Polka-dot V". Originally created by luthier Karl Sandoval of California (used by Randy Rhoads), the guitar is often mistaken as a custom Flying V.

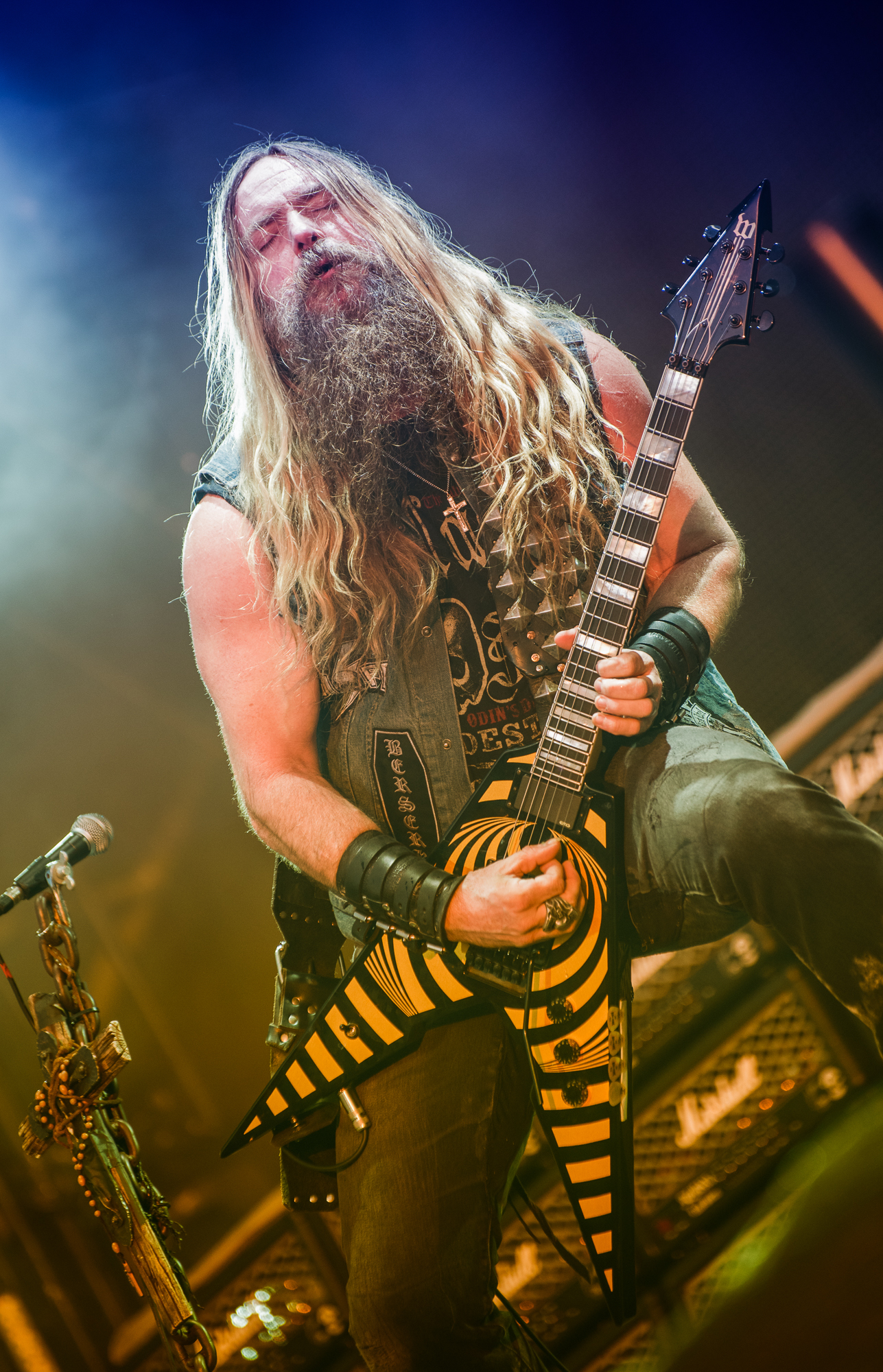
Wylde at Wacken Open Air 2015

Wylde has a custom Dean Splittail with a mud splatter bulls-eye graphic, as well as a signature Splittail shaped Gibson model called the "ZV". Another Dean in his collection is a Dime series Razorback with custom Bulls-eye graphics ordered for him specially by Dimebag Darrell shortly before his murder in 2004; since receiving the guitar, he has only ever used it on stage to play the song "In This River", Zakk's personal tribute to Dimebag.

In practice, Wylde uses Marshall MG Series practice combos ranging in wattage levels from 10-30W during tour/private use especially in hotels and buses. He has also been known to use Marshall Valvestate combo amplifiers. Wylde has an extensive relationship with Marshall Amplification due to his love for their amplifiers, both solid state and tube-driven. Live, Wylde exclusively uses Marshall JCM 800's with twin 4 X 12 Cabinets loaded with EVM12L 300W Black Label Speakers. His usual signal path consists of his guitar > (on stage pedal board) Dunlop Wylde Wah > Dunlop Wylde Rotovibe > MXR ZW Phase 90 > MXR Wylde Overdrive > MXR Carbon Copy Delay > (to a back stage pedal board) > MXR EVH Flanger > MXR Black Label Chorus > split signals, one to each distorted amp into the High Gain input.

A detailed gear diagram of Wylde's 1988 Ozzy Osbourne guitar rig is well-documented.

At the 2015 NAMM Show, Wylde announced his new company called Wylde Audio and provided a preview of his new line of custom guitars and amplifiers. Currently he now is seen playing Wylde Audio equipment almost exclusively.

== Awards ==
In January 2006, Zakk Wylde was recognized at the Hollywood Rock Walk of Fame for his successful career as a musician and his contribution to the music industry. The event was open to the public and was attended by musicians including Ozzy Osbourne.

In 2010, Wylde accepted the Metal Hammer Golden God Award.

== Discography ==
with Ozzy Osbourne

- 1988: No Rest for the Wicked
- 1990: Just Say Ozzy (live album)
- 1991: No More Tears
- 1993: Live & Loud (live album)
- 1995: Ozzmosis
- 2001: Down to Earth
- 2002: Live at Budokan (live album)
- 2007: Black Rain
- 2022: Patient Number 9

with Pride & Glory

- 1994: Pride & Glory

Solo

- 1996: Book of Shadows
- 2016: Book of Shadows II

with Zakk Sabbath

- 2016: Fairies Wear Boots (Live Bootleg: Los Angeles '16) (live Single)
- 2017: Live in Detroit (live EP)
- 2020: Vertigo
- 2024: Doomed Forever Forever Doomed

with Black Label Society

Main article: Black Label Society discography
- 1998: Sonic Brew
- 2000: Stronger than Death
- 2001: Alcohol Fueled Brewtality Live!! +5
- 2002: 1919 Eternal
- 2003: The Blessed Hellride
- 2004: Hangover Music Vol. VI
- 2005: Mafia
- 2006: Shot to Hell
- 2009: Skullage
- 2010: Order of the Black
- 2011: The Song Remains Not the Same
- 2013: Unblackened
- 2014: Catacombs of the Black Vatican
- 2018: Grimmest Hits
- 2019: Nuns and Roaches: Tasty Little Bastards (EP)
- 2021: The Song Remains Not the Same II
- 2021: Doom Crew Inc.
- 2026: Engines of Demolition

== Other media ==
=== Guest performances ===
Wylde has made guest performances on tracks by other artists:

- He contributed a guitar solo on Britny Fox's track "Six Guns Loaded" from their 1991 release, Bite Down Hard.
- He guested on Blackfoot's 1994 album After the Reign playing the second solo on the title track.
- He played "White Christmas" on the Merry Axemas 2 Christmas guitar album.
- He appears as guest vocalist and guitarist on the tracks "Soul Bleed" and "Reborn" on Damageplan's debut album, New Found Power.
- He played guitar solos on Dope's single "Addiction" from their 2009 album, No Regrets.
- He plays a solo on the songs "Nameless Faceless" and "Wanderlust" on Fozzy's 2005 release All That Remains.
- He has played on eight of Derek Sherinian's solo albums including Inertia, Black Utopia, Mythology, Blood of the Snake and Molecular Heinosity.
- Wylde was a judge for the eighth annual Independent Music Awards. His contributions helped assist independent artists' careers.
- In 2010, he played lead guitar on My Darkest Days' first single "Porn Star Dancing", along with guest singers Chad Kroeger and Ludacris.
- In 2011, he featured in Jamey Jasta of Hatebreed's new project, Jasta, in the song "The Fearless Must Endure".
- He plays the guitar solo on Black Veil Brides' cover of the Kiss song "Unholy" on their EP, Rebels.
- Wylde contributed a solo to "Monument / Monolith", a song by The Rippingtons on their album Built to Last, which was released in 2012.
- He contributes a guitar solo on the track "Steep Climb" on Eric Gales' 2014 album Good For Sumthin.

=== Live guest performances ===
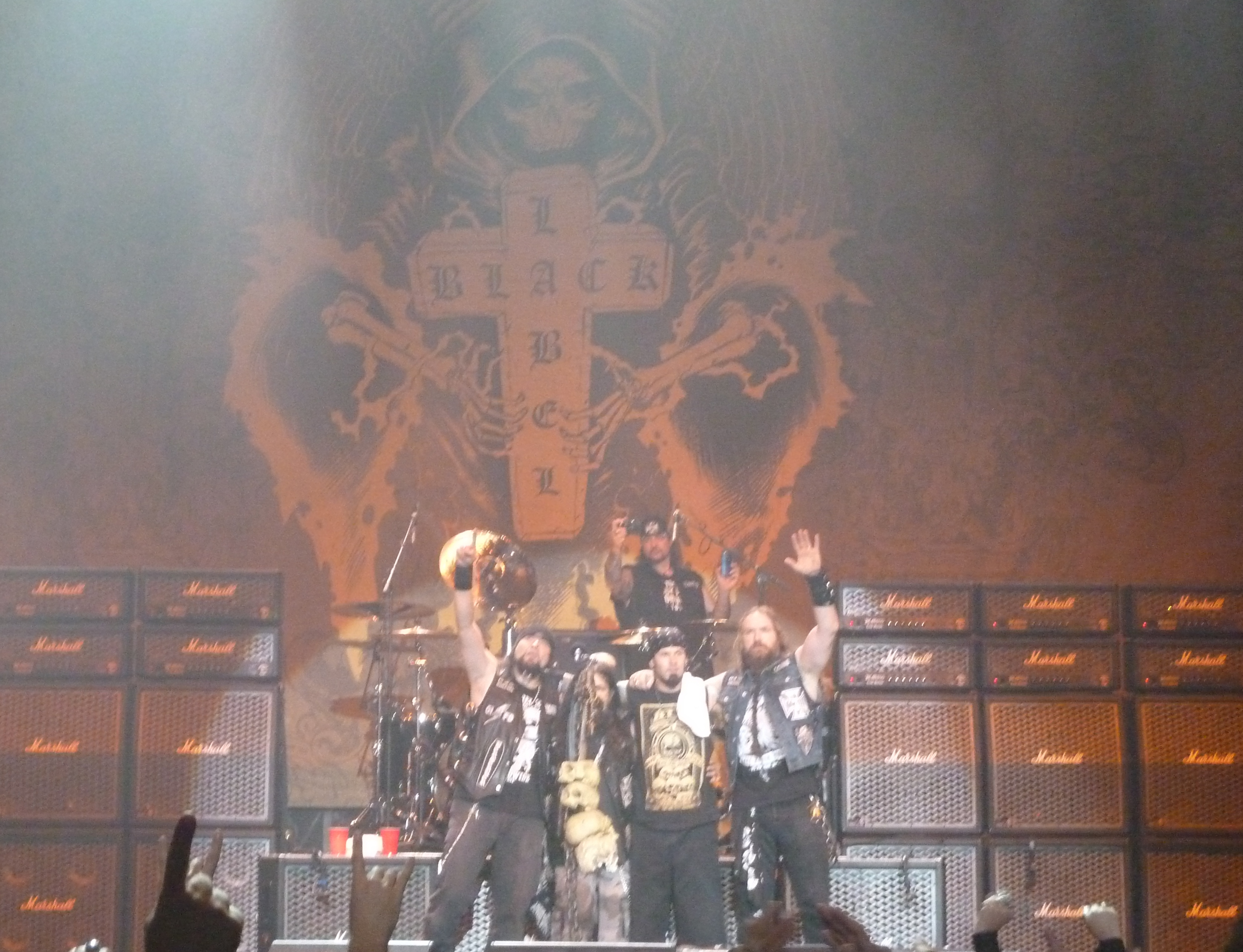
Black Label Society performing in October 2011

- On August 1, 1993, at Great Woods Amphitheatre in Mansfield, Massachusetts, Wylde appeared on stage with the Allman Brothers on lead guitar since Dickey Betts was unable to make the show, and they needed a guitarist at the last minute. This show is documented on the bootleg Zakk Goes Wylde.
- Wylde performed the U.S. national anthem on the electric guitar during a New York Rangers game in October 2005. He has also played the anthem at Los Angeles Kings and Dodgers games. A video of a Kings performance is included as an extra feature on the DVD Boozed, Broozed & Broken-Boned.
- On February 1, 2007, Wylde and Nick Catanese began a tour of acoustic shows at the Hard Rock Cafe in various cities across North America. Although Catanese had to leave mid-tour due to unspecified personal reasons, Wylde continued to play shows alone. He performed several songs on both the acoustic guitar and keyboard. The tour was eventually canceled due to unspecified reasons.
- On April 13, 2011, he was the guitarist for James Durbin on American Idol, during Durbin's performance of "Heavy Metal" by Sammy Hagar.
- On April 20, 2011, he joined Michael Bearden and the Ese Vatos (house band for Lopez Tonight) to perform the Lenny Kravitz song "Are You Gonna Go My Way".
- On May 14, 2011, Wylde performed the U.S. national anthem at Rockfest in Kansas City, Missouri.
- Wylde appeared onstage December 8, 2011, in Indianapolis, Indiana, to play a cover of AC/DC's "Whole Lotta Rosie" with Guns N' Roses while Black Label Society opened for Guns N' Roses during a leg of the US tour. Wylde also did this on subsequent shows before Black Label Society finished their run on the tour.
- Since late 2014, Wylde has appeared as one of the performers on the Experience Hendrix tour along with Billy Cox, Eric Johnson, Jonny Lang, Kenny Wayne Shepherd, Buddy Guy, Dweezil Zappa, Chris Layton, Samantha Fish, Taj Mahal, Christone "Kingfish" Ingram and others. Wylde often performs "Manic Depression", "Little Wing", and "Purple Haze", as well as playing alongside many of the other performers.

=== Acting performances ===
- In 2001, Wylde appeared as the lead guitarist for a fictional band called Steel Dragon in the movie Rock Star, starring Mark Wahlberg and Jennifer Aniston.
- Wylde appeared as himself in the Adult Swim animated program Aqua Teen Hunger Force, in the episode "Spirit Journey Formation Anniversary" (season 2, episode 14, first broadcast on October 19, 2003).
- Wylde appeared in the Californication episode "Suicide Solution" in 2011, credited as "Guitar Guy".
- Wylde also appeared playing guitar alongside Lorne and other audience members in Angel's season 4 episode "The Magic Bullet" in 2003.
- Wylde appeared in the 2010 film Bones as Jed, Bones' uncle.

=== Other media ===
- Wylde was featured in a Behind the Music episode on Pantera.
- Wylde appeared in the 2008 music video game Guitar Hero World Tour as a playable character. He becomes unlocked upon defeating him in a specially recorded guitar battle and completing the Black Label Society song "Stillborn".
- In 2012, Zakk Wylde participated in the 'Rock & Roll Roast of Zakk Wylde', a comedy roast to benefit charity. Filmed at the City National Grove in Anaheim, California, notable people attended the event as roasters including Scott Ian, Corey Taylor, Sharon Osbourne, Kerry King, John DeServio, Glenn Hughes, and Richie Faulkner.
