= Black Label Society discography =

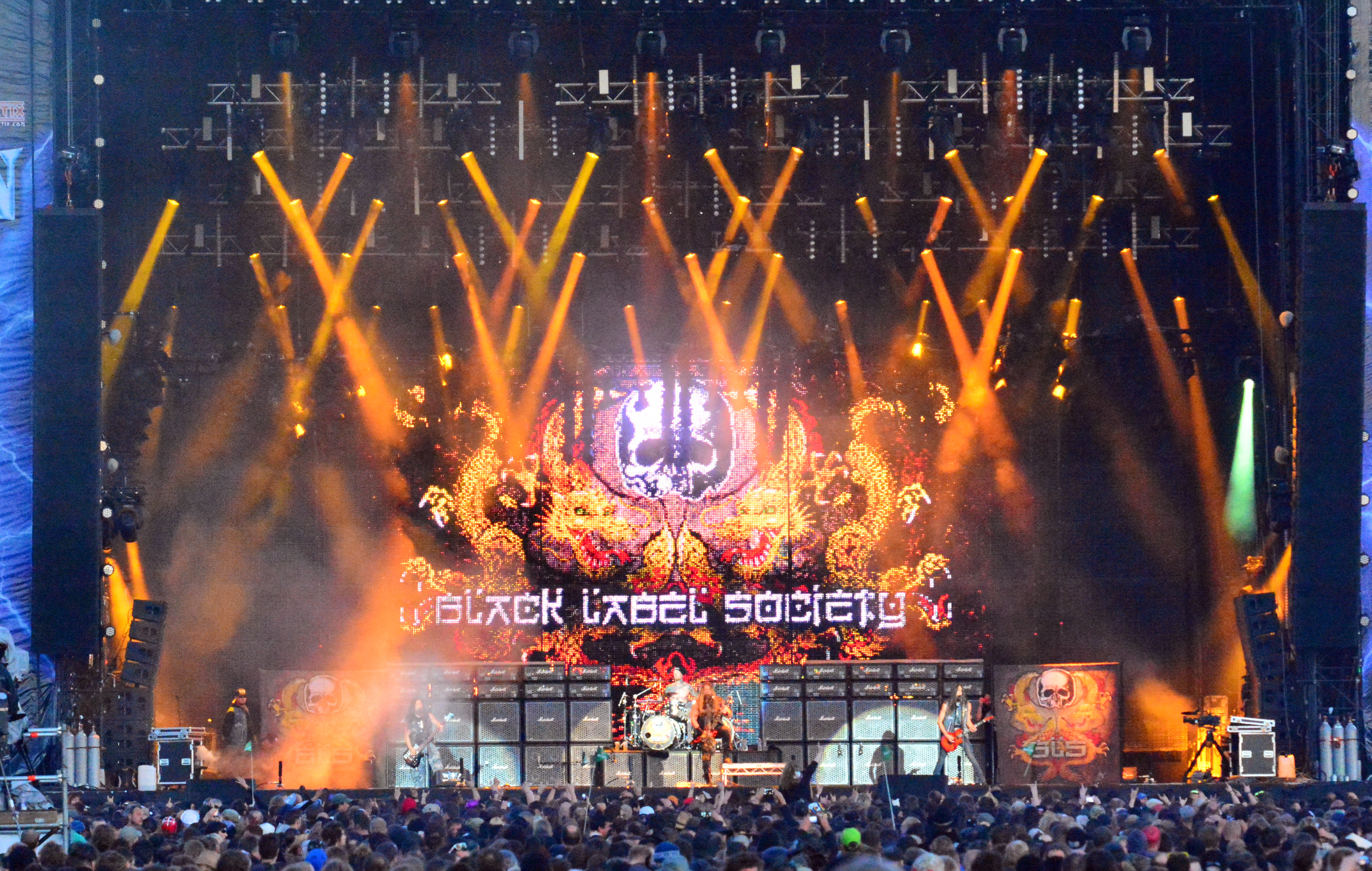
- Studio albums: 12
- EPs: 3
- Live albums: 3
- Compilation albums: 4
- Singles: 27
- Video albums: 4
- Music videos: 27

The discography of American heavy metal band Black Label Society consists of 12 studio albums, three live albums, four compilation albums, four video albums, three extended plays and 27 singles.

== Albums ==
=== Studio albums ===
List of studio albums, with selected chart positions
Title	Album details	Peak chart positions										Sales
Title	Album details	US	AUS	AUT	FIN	FRA	GER	JPN	SWE	SWI	UK	Sales
Sonic Brew	Released: May 4, 1999 (US); Label: Spitfire; Formats: CD, LP, digital download	—	—	—	—	—	—	24	—	—	—	US: 69,097
Stronger Than Death	Released: April 18, 2000 (US); Label: Spitfire; Formats: CD, LP, digital download	—	—	—	—	—	—	43	—	—	—	US: 68,040
1919 Eternal	Released: March 5, 2002 (US); Label: Spitfire; Formats: CD, LP, digital download	—	—	—	—	—	—	59	—	—	155	US: 69,807
The Blessed Hellride	Released: April 22, 2003 (US); Label: Spitfire; Formats: CD, LP, digital download	50	—	—	38	—	—	97	—	—	121	US: 154,012
Hangover Music Vol. VI	Released: April 20, 2004 (US); Label: Spitfire; Formats: CD, LP, digital download	40	—	—	32	184	—	114	—	—	90	US: 24,000
Mafia	Released: March 8, 2005 (US); Label: Artemis; Formats: CD, LP, digital download	15	—	—	33	170	—	96	17	—	97	US: 45,000
Shot to Hell	Released: September 12, 2006 (US); Label: Roadrunner; Formats: CD, LP, digital download	21	64	—	21	182	95	77	22	64	69	US: 32,000
Order of the Black	Released: August 10, 2010 (US); Label: eOne; Formats: CD, LP, digital download	4	44	67	13	112	31	104	27	45	84	US: 64,100
Catacombs of the Black Vatican	Released: April 8, 2014 (US); Label: eOne; Formats: CD, LP, digital download	5	31	45	12	64	29	95	52	35	30	US: 80,000
Grimmest Hits	Released: January 19, 2018 (US); Label: eOne; Formats: CD, LP, digital download	29	30	26	50	79	21	—	—	25	78	
Doom Crew Inc.	Released: November 26, 2021 (US); Label: eOne; Formats: CD, LP, digital download	142	—	—	35	—	38	—	—	23	—	
Engines of Demolition	Released: March 27, 2026 (US); Label: MNRK; Formats: CD, LP, digital download	31	61	11	—	—	10	—	—	14	61	
"—" denotes a recording that did not chart or was not released in that territory.

=== Live albums ===
List of live albums, with selected chart positions
Title	Album details	Peak chart positions							Sales
Title	Album details	US	US Hard Rock	US Rock	BEL (WA)	GER	UK	UK Rock	Sales
Alcohol Fueled Brewtality Live!! +5	Released: January 16, 2001 (US); Label: Spitfire; Formats: CD, digital download	—	—	—	—	—	—	—	US: 33,851+
Unblackened	Released: September 24, 2013 (US); Label: eOne; Formats: CD, digital download	72	6	25	186	90	152	18	US: 8,200+
Live at Dynamo Open Air 1999	Released: May 29, 2019; Label: F.R.E.T. Ab/Caroline; Formats: CD	—	—	—	—	—	—	—	
"—" denotes a recording that did not chart or was not released in that territory.

=== Compilation albums ===
List of compilation albums, with selected chart positions
Title	Album details	Peak chart positions				Sales
Title	Album details	US	US Hard Rock	US Rock	CAN	Sales
Kings of Damnation 98–04	Released: October 4, 2005 (US); Label: Spitfire; Formats: CD, digital download	—	—	—	—	
Skullage	Released: April 21, 2009 (US); Label: Armoury; Formats: CD, LP, digital download	111	17	—	40	US: 7,600+
Black Label Berzerkus 2010	Released: November 9, 2010 (US); Label: eOne; Formats: Digital download	149	13	38	—	US: 4,000+
The Song Remains Not the Same	Released: May 10, 2011 (US); Label: eOne; Formats: CD, digital download	41	2	11	35	US: 18,390+
"—" denotes a recording that did not chart or was not released in that territory.

=== Video albums ===
List of video albums, with selected chart positions
Title	Album details	Peak chart positions			
Title	Album details	US Video	AUS DVD	JPN DVD	UK Video
Boozed, Broozed & Broken-Boned	Released: August 12, 2003 (US); Label: Eagle Vision; Formats: DVD, UMD	3	—	—	—
The European Invasion – Doom Troopin' Live	Released: August 22, 2006 (US); Label: Eagle Vision; Formats: DVD, Blu-ray	—	—	—	4
Skullage	Released: April 21, 2009 (US); Label: Eagle Vision; Formats: DVD	1	—	—	—
Unblackened	Released: September 24, 2013 (US); Label: Eagle Vision; Formats: DVD, Blu-ray	5	15	283	12
"—" denotes a recording that did not chart or was not released in that territory.

=== Extended plays ===
List of extended plays
Title	Album details
No More Tears	Released: 1999 (US); Label: Spitfire; Formats: CD
Glorious Christmas Songs That Will Make Your Black Label Heart Feel Good	Released: November 1, 2011 (US); Label: eOne; Formats: Digital download
Nuns and Roaches: Tasty Little Bastards	Released: November 29, 2019 (US); Label: eOne; Formats: Vinyl LP

== Singles ==
List of singles, with selected chart positions, showing year released and album name
Title	Year	Peak chart positions				Certifications	Album
Title	Year	US Act. Rock	US Hard Rock Digi.	US Main. Rock	CAN Rock	Certifications	Album
"Bored to Tears"	1999	—	—	—	—		Sonic Brew
"Born to Lose"	1999	—	—	—	—		Sonic Brew
"Counterfeit God"	2000	—	—	—	—		Stronger Than Death
"Bleed for Me"	2002	—	—	—	—		1919 Eternal
"Stillborn" (featuring Ozzy Osbourne)	2003	—	—	12	—	MC: Gold	The Blessed Hellride
"The Blessed Hellride"	2003	—	—	—	—		The Blessed Hellride
"House of Doom"	2004	—	—	33	—		Hangover Music Vol. VI
"Suicide Messiah"	2005	—	—	24	—		Mafia
"Fire It Up"	2005	—	—	35	—		Mafia
"In This River"	2005	—	—	32	—		Mafia
"Concrete Jungle"	2006	—	—	29	—		Shot to Hell
"Blood Is Thicker Than Water"	2007	—	—	31	—		Shot to Hell
"Parade of the Dead"	2010	24	—	28	—		Order of the Black
"Crazy Horse"	2010	—	—	—	—		Order of the Black
"Overlord"	2010	—	—	—	—		Order of the Black
"The First Noel"	2010	—	—	—	—		Non-album single
"Darkest Days"	2011	—	—	—	—		Order of the Black
"Ain't No Sunshine"	2013	—	—	—	42		Unblackened
"My Dying Time"	2014	—	—	17	—		Catacombs of the Black Vatican
"Angel of Mercy"	2014	—	—	27	—		Catacombs of the Black Vatican
"Room of Nightmares"	2017	—	—	29	—		Grimmest Hits
"A Love Unreal"	2018	—	—	—	—		Grimmest Hits
"Set You Free"	2021	—	—	31	—		Doom Crew Inc.
"End of Days"	2021	—	—	—	—		Doom Crew Inc.
"You Made Me Want To Live"	2022	—	—	38	—		Doom Crew Inc.
"Lord Humungus"	2025	—	6	—	—		Engines of Demolition
"Broken and Blind"	2025	—	—	—	—		Engines of Demolition
"Name In Blood"	2026	—	—	5	—		Engines of Demolition
"Ozzy's Song"	2026	—	3	37	—		Engines of Demolition
"—" denotes a recording that did not chart or was not released in that territory.

== Music videos ==
Year	Title	Director(s)	Album	Ref.
2001	"Counterfeit God"	Bill Schacht	Stronger Than Death	
2003	"Stillborn"	Rob Zombie	The Blessed Hellride	
2005	"Suicide Messiah"	Eric Zimmerman	Mafia	
2005	"Fire It Up"	Eric Zimmerman, Nik Jamgocyan	Mafia	
2005	"In This River"	Eric Zimmerman	Mafia	
2006	"New Religion"	Eric Zimmerman, Nik Jamgocyan	Shot to Hell	
2006	"Concrete Jungle"	Alex Topaller, Daniel Shapiro	Shot to Hell	
2007	"Blood Is Thicker Than Water"	Eric Zimmerman, Nik Jamgocyan	Shot to Hell	
2010	"Overlord"	Eric Zimmerman, Nik Jamgocyan	Order of the Black	
2011	"Crazy Horse"	Kootra	Order of the Black	
2013	"Ain't No Sunshine"	Justin Reich	Unblackened	
2014	"My Dying Time"	Justin Reich	Catacombs of the Black Vatican	
2014	"Angel of Mercy"	Justin Reich	Catacombs of the Black Vatican	
2015	"The Nomad"	Valerio R.	Catacombs of the Black Vatican	
2017	"Room of Nighmares"	Justin Reich	Grimmest Hits	
2018	"A Love Unreal"	Justin Reich	Grimmest Hits	
2018	"Trampled Down Below"	Dan Sturgess	Grimmest Hits	
2019	"Bored to Tears"	Justin Reich	Sonic Brew	
2021	"Blind Man"	Justin Reich	None More Black Box Set	
2021	"Heart of Darkness"	—	None More Black Box Set	
2021	"House of Doom"	—	None More Black Box Set	
2021	"Set You Free"		Doom Crew Inc.	
2021	"End of Days"		Doom Crew Inc.	
2022	"You Made Me Want to Live"		Doom Crew Inc.	
2024	"The Gallows"	Justin Reich	Engines of Demolition	
2025	"Lord Humungus"	Justin Reich	Engines of Demolition	
2025	"Broken and Blind"	Justin Reich	Engines of Demolition	
2026	"Name In Blood"	Justin Reich	Engines of Demolition	
2026	"Ozzy's Song"	Justin Reich	Engines of Demolition	
