= Skullage =

Greatest hits album by Black Label Society
- Released: April 21, 2009
- Recorded: 1994–2006
- Genre: Heavy metal; southern metal; groove metal; hard rock
- Label: Armoury, Eagle Rock

Black Label Society chronology
Shot to Hell (2006)	Skullage (2009)	Order of the Black (2010)

Professional ratings
Review scores
Source	Rating
AllMusic	3.5/5 stars
Blabbermouth.net	5/10
Brave Words & Bloody Knuckles	7/10
Stormbringer	3/5
The Hollywood Reporter	(favorable)

Skullage is the second compilation album by American heavy metal band Black Label Society, although the first two songs are from Zakk Wylde's solo career and side project Pride & Glory. Some versions also come with a bonus DVD.

This is the third compilation released to document Wylde's catalogue, the first being the promotional-only No More Tears EP, followed by Kings of Damnation 98–04 in 2005.

== Track listing ==
=== Disc I (CD) ===
1. "Machine Gun Man" – 4:57 (Pride & Glory)
2. "Dead as Yesterday" – 2:51 (Book of Shadows)
3. "All for You" – 4:00 (Stronger Than Death)
4. "13 Years of Grief" – (Stronger Than Death)
5. "Bleed for Me" – (1919 Eternal)
6. "Doomsday Jesus" – (The Blessed Hellride)
7. "Stillborn" – (The Blessed Hellride)
8. "Won't Find It Here" – (Hangover Music Vol. VI)
9. "Suicide Messiah" – (Mafia)
10. "In This River" – (Mafia)
11. "Fire It Up" – (Mafia)
12. "New Religion" – (Shot to Hell)
13. Slightly Amped Instrumental Intro (acoustic) – recorded live on February 13, 2004, in Lehigh Valley
14. "The Blessed Hellride" (acoustic) – recorded live on February 13, 2004, in Lehigh Valley
15. "Spoke in the Wheel" (acoustic) – recorded live on February 13, 2004, in Lehigh Valley
16. "Stillborn" (acoustic) – recorded live on February 13, 2004, in Lehigh Valley

=== Disc II (DVD) ===
1. "All for You"
2. "13 Years of Grief"
3. "Bleed for Me"
4. "Stillborn" (video)
5. "Suicide Messiah" (video)
6. "In This River" (video)
7. "Fire It Up" (video)
8. "Acoustic" (live)
9. "Instrumental Intro" (Live in Lehigh Valley)
10. "The Blessed Hellride" (Live in Lehigh Valley)
11. "Spoke in the Wheel" (Live in Lehigh Valley)
12. "We Live No More" (Live in Lehigh Valley)
13. "Stillborn" (Live in Lehigh Valley)
14. "New Religion"
15. "Welcome to the Compound"

== Credits (CD side) ==
- Zakk Wylde – vocals, guitar, bass on 3–9, piano
- James LoMenzo – bass on tracks 1, 2, 9, 10, 11
- John DeServio – bass on track 12
- Brian Tichy – drums on track 1
- Joe Vitale – drums on track 2
- Philth – drums on tracks 3 and 4
- Christian Werr – drums on track 5
- Craig Nunenmacher – drums on tracks 6–12
- Nick Catanese – 12-string acoustic guitar on tracks 13–16

== Charts ==
Chart performance for Skullage
Chart (2018)	Peak position
US Billboard 200	111
US Independent Albums (Billboard)	9
US Top Hard Rock Albums (Billboard)	17
