= Kings of Damnation 98–04 =

Greatest hits album by Black Label Society
- Released: October 4, 2005
- Recorded: 1994–2004
- Genre: Heavy metal; southern metal; groove metal; hard rock
- Length: 72:30
- Label: Spitfire Records

Black Label Society chronology
| Mafia (2005) | Kings of Damnation 98–04 (2005) | The European Invasion - Doom Troopin' Live (2006) |

Professional ratings
Review scores
| Source | Rating |
|---|---|
| AllMusic | 4/5 stars |
| Blabbermouth.net | 8/10 |

Kings of Damnation 98–04 is the first compilation album by American heavy metal band Black Label Society, although the first four tracks are pre-1998 and not actual Black Label Society tracks. The limited edition digipak contains a seven-track bonus disc featuring cover songs and videos.

This is the second compilation released to document Zakk Wylde's catalogue, the first being the promotional-only No More Tears EP.

== Track listing ==
1. "Losin' Your Mind" – 5:28 – (Pride & Glory)
2. "Horse Called War" – 5:01 – (Pride & Glory)
3. "Between Heaven and Hell" – 3:22 – (Wylde)
4. "Sold My Soul" – 4:53 – (Wylde)
5. "Bored to Tears" – 4:28
6. "Bleed for Me" – 5:30
7. "T.A.Z." – 1:55
8. "Counterfeit God" – 4:18
9. "Stronger Than Death" – 4:53
10. "Speedball" – 0:58
11. "Demise of Sanity" – 3:23
12. "We Live No More" – 3:59
13. "Stillborn" – 3:15
14. "The Blessed Hellride" – 4:32
15. "Crazy or High" – 3:34
16. "House of Doom" – 3:45
17. "Takillya" – 0:40
18. "Doomsday Inc." – 4:24 (*)
19. "S.D.M.F." – 3:32 (*)

(*) previously unreleased

=== Bonus enhanced CD ===
1. "No More Tears" – (Ozzy Osbourne cover)
2. "A Whiter Shade of Pale" – (Procol Harum cover)
3. "Heart of Gold" – (Neil Young cover)
4. "Snowblind" – (Black Sabbath cover)
5. "The Wizard" – (Black Sabbath cover) – (Pride & Glory)
6. "In My Time of Dying" – (as made famous by Led Zeppelin) – (Pride & Glory)
7. "Come Together" – 3:51 (Beatles cover) – (Pride & Glory)
8. "Counterfeit God" (video)
9. "Stillborn" (video)
10. "Bleed for Me" (video)

== Credits ==
Below credits are for the main disc, not the bonus disc:

- Zakk Wylde – guitar, vocals, piano, bass
- James Lomenzo – bass (tracks 1–4, 16)
- Brian Tichy – drums (tracks 1, 2)
- Joe Vitale – drums (tracks 3, 4)
- Phil Ondich – drums (tracks 5, 8, 9)
- Christian Werr – drums (tracks 6, 11)
- Craig Nunenmacher – drums (tracks 12–16, 18, 19)
- Mike Inez – bass (track 15)
- Mike Piazza – "Growls of Doom" on track 9
- Ozzy Osbourne – vocals (track 13)
- Production/Engineering by Zakk Wylde, Rick Parashar, John Plum, Ron and Howard Albert, Lee DeCarlo, Rony Brack, Eddie Mapp, Barry Conley

== Charts ==
Chart performance for Kings of Damnation 98–04
| Chart (2005) | Peak position |
|---|---|
| US Independent Albums (Billboard) | 23 |
