= The European Invasion – Doom Troopin' Live =

The European Invasion - Doom Troopin' Live

Video by Black Label Society
- Released: August 22, 2006
- Genre: Heavy metal; southern metal; hard rock
- Length: 222 minutes
- Label: Roadrunner
- Director: Nik Jamgocyan, Eric Zimmerman
- Producer: Perry Joseph

Black Label Society chronology
Kings of Damnation 98–04 (2005)	The European Invasion - Doom Troopin' Live (2006)	Shot to Hell (2006)

Professional ratings
Review scores
Source	Rating
Brave Words & Bloody Knuckles	8.5/10
Metal.de	8/10

The European Invasion – Doom Troopin' Live is the second video album by American heavy metal band Black Label Society. It was released on DVD in 2006, just before the band's Shot to Hell album. It was ranked at number 4 on the UK Music and DVD Chart.

The DVD contains footage from two different concerts, in Paris and London, and also includes videos from the songs "Suicide Messiah", "In This River", and "Fire It Up", as well as a making-of feature for the "Suicide Messiah" video. It also included is a 50-minute featurette called "Backstage Pass".

On August 24, 2010, The European Invasion – Doom Troopin' Live was released on Blu-ray.

== Track listing ==
=== Paris chapter ===
1. Intro Jam
2. Stoned and Drunk
3. Destruction Overdrive
4. Been a Long Time
5. Iron Man Interlude
6. Funeral Bell
7. Suffering Overdue
8. In This River
9. Suicide Messiah
10. Demise of Sanity
11. Spread Your Wings
12. Solo Acoustic Jam
13. Spoke in the Wheel
14. Fire It Up
15. Stillborn
16. Genocide Junkies

=== London chapter ===
1. Been a Long Time
2. Suicide Messiah
3. Stillborn Jam
4. Genocide Junkies

== Credits ==
- Zakk Wylde – vocals, guitar
- Nick Catanese – guitar, backing vocals
- James LoMenzo – bass, backing vocals
- Craig Nunenmacher – drums
