= Sonic Brew =

Studio album by Black Label Society
- Released: October 28, 1998 (Japan); May 4, 1999 (US; was re-issued later in the year due to legal problems with original cover)
- Recorded: 1998 (U.S. bonus tracks, 1999)
- Genre: Heavy metal; southern metal; groove metal; hard rock
- Length: 55:13
- Label: Spitfire
- Producer: Ron Albert, Howard Albert, Zakk Wylde

Black Label Society chronology
No More Tears (EP) (1999)	Sonic Brew (1998)	Stronger Than Death (2000)

Professional ratings
Review scores
Source	Rating
AllMusic	4/5 stars
Rock Hard	8/10

Sonic Brew is the debut studio album by American heavy metal band Black Label Society, released on October 28, 1998, in Japan and May 4, 1999, in the United States by Spitfire Records.

== Release ==
There was a long delay before it was released outside Japan because of poor audio mixing. Due to the delay, Wylde and drummer Phil Ondich recorded "Lost My Better Half" as a bonus track for the U.S. edition. The recording of the more aggressive track reportedly prompted Zakk Wylde to pursue a heavier direction for the band's music thereafter. Sonic Brew was finally released on May 4, 1999, with a standard gloss-printed booklet. Early copies came packed with a free Zakk Wylde guitar pick.

Subsequently, the Johnnie Walker whisky company issued a cease-and-desist order to Wylde on the album cover, which had been designed to match, except for its wording, the distiller's graphic design for its bottles of Black Label Whisky. The band decided to reissue the album with a different album cover with the band's skull logo, and as an added incentive for fans who wanted to buy this now-third version of the album, they included a cover of Ozzy Osbourne's "No More Tears", which Wylde and Mike Inez had written.

"Born to Lose" and "No More Tears" were released as promotional singles for the album, though no videos were made. "Bored to Tears" had a promotional video released for the album's 20th anniversary.

On May 17, 2019, Black Label Society released the 20th Anniversary Edition of Sonic Brew, titled Sonic Brew - 20th Anniversary Blend 5.99 - 5.19. The remixed album contains two bonus tracks, a piano version of "Spoke in the Wheel" and an acoustic version of "Black Pearl". On May 31, 2019, the remixed album was ranked number 8 on Billboard's Top Independent Albums Chart.

== Track listing ==
All tracks are written by Zakk Wylde except where noted.

No.	Title	Length
1.	"Bored to Tears"	4:28
2.	"The Rose Petalled Garden"	4:55
3.	"Hey You (Batch of Lies)"	3:53
4.	"Born to Lose"	4:23
5.	"Peddlers of Death"	4:33
6.	"Mother Mary"	4:26
7.	"Beneath the Tree"	4:09
8.	"Low Down"	5:04
9.	"T.A.Z."	1:56
10.	"Black Pearl"	3:27
11.	"World of Trouble"	5:20
12.	"Spoke in the Wheel"	4:13
13.	"The Beginning... At Last"	4:26

1999 US issue track listing
No.	Title	Length
1.	"Bored to Tears"	4:28
2.	"The Rose Petalled Garden"	4:55
3.	"Hey You (Batch of Lies)"	3:53
4.	"Born to Lose"	4:23
5.	"Peddlers of Death"	4:33
6.	"Mother Mary"	4:26
7.	"Beneath the Tree"	4:09
8.	"Low Down"	5:04
9.	"T.A.Z."	1:56
10.	"Lost My Better Half"	4:24
11.	"Black Pearl"	3:27
12.	"World of Trouble"	5:20
13.	"Spoke in the Wheel"	4:13
14.	"The Beginning... At Last"	4:26

1999 US reissue track listing
No.	Title	Length
1.	"Bored to Tears"	4:28
2.	"The Rose Petalled Garden"	4:55
3.	"Hey You (Batch of Lies)"	3:53
4.	"Born to Lose"	4:23
5.	"Peddlers of Death"	4:33
6.	"Mother Mary"	4:26
7.	"Beneath the Tree"	4:09
8.	"Low Down"	5:04
9.	"T.A.Z."	1:56
10.	"Lost My Better Half"	4:24
11.	"Black Pearl"	3:27
12.	"World of Trouble"	5:20
13.	"Spoke in the Wheel"	4:13
14.	"The Beginning... At Last"	4:26
15.	"No More Tears" (Ozzy Osbourne, Wylde, Randy Castillo, Mike Inez, John Purdell)	6:57

Notes

- The song "Mother Mary" originated as an unreleased Pride & Glory demo, a live version of which was performed during Pride & Glory's set at the Donington Monsters of Rock Festival in 1994. The Black Label Society version is almost completely different both musically and lyrically, but both do share the same basic chorus lyrics.
- This version of song "Peddlers of Death" has a main riff similar to Black Sabbath's "Sweet Leaf" from Master of Reality. The original version of the song was an acoustic bonus track Zakk Wylde's Book of Shadows album.

== Personnel ==
Black Label Society

- Zakk Wylde – guitars, vocals, bass, piano
- Phil Ondich – drums
- Mike Inez – bass on "No More Tears"

Production

- Produced and mixed by Ron Albert, Howard Albert, and Zakk Wylde, except tracks 10 and 15 (Wylde)
- Engineered and mixed by Lee DeCarlo, assisted by Rony Brack
- Mastered by Frank Cesarano
