= No More Tears (EP) =

EP by Black Label Society
- Released: 1999
- Genres: Heavy metal, hard rock
- Length: 30:51
- Label: Spitfire
- Producers: Ron Albert; Howard Albert; Rick Parashar (tracks 3 & 4)

Black Label Society chronology
| Sonic Brew (1998) | No More Tears (1999) | Stronger Than Death (2000) |

No More Tears is the first EP by American heavy metal band Black Label Society, released in 1999. The title track is a cover of the Ozzy Osbourne song by the same name, featuring bassist Mike Inez.

It was released as a promotional compilation CD to promote both the reissue of the band's Sonic Brew, as well as Spitfire Records' reissues of Zakk Wylde's albums Pride & Glory and Book of Shadows.

== Track listing ==
| No. | Title | Writer(s) | Performer | Length |
|---|---|---|---|---|
| 1. | "No More Tears" (Ozzy Osbourne cover) | Ozzy Osbourne, Zakk Wylde, Mike Inez, Randy Castillo, John Purdell | Black Label Society | 6:54 |
| 2. | "Born to Lose" | Wylde | Black Label Society | 4:21 |
| 3. | "The Wizard" (Black Sabbath cover) | Osbourne, Tony Iommi, Geezer Butler, Bill Ward | Pride & Glory | 4:42 |
| 4. | "Come Together" (The Beatles cover) | Lennon–McCartney | Pride & Glory | 3:51 |
| 5. | "Sold My Soul" | Wylde | Zakk Wylde | 4:53 |
| 6. | "Peddlers of Death" (Acoustic) | Wylde | Zakk Wylde | 5:50 |
| Total length: | | | | 30:51 |

== Personnel ==
- Zakk Wylde – vocals, guitar, bass, harmonica
- Phil Ondich – drums (tracks 1 and 2)
- Mike Inez – bass (track 1)
- Joe Vitale – drums, keyboards (tracks 5 and 6)
- James Lomenzo – bass (tracks 3, 4, 5 and 6)
- Brian Tichy – drums (tracks 3 and 4)
