= Catacombs of the Black Vatican =

Studio album by Black Label Society
- Released: April 7, 2014
- Genre: Heavy metal; southern metal; hard rock
- Length: 44:39
- Label: Mascot (Europe) eOne (US)
- Producer: Zakk Wylde

Black Label Society chronology
Unblackened (2013)	Catacombs of the Black Vatican (2014)	Grimmest Hits (2018)

Singles from Catacombs of the Black Vatican
- 1. "My Dying Time" Released: January 21, 2014; 2. "Angel of Mercy" Released: June 18, 2014

Catacombs of the Black Vatican is the ninth studio album by American heavy metal band Black Label Society. The album was released in the UK on April 7, 2014, and in the US on April 8. It is the only Black Label Society album to feature former Breaking Benjamin drummer Chad Szeliga after fill-in Mike Froedge departed the band. Froedge himself replaced Will Hunt, who in turn replaced longtime drummer Craig Nunenmacher, all in the span of fewer than two years.

== Reception ==
Professional ratings
Review scores
Source	Rating
About.com	4/5 stars
AllMusic	3/5 stars
Blabbermouth.net	8.5/10
Loudwire	4/5 stars
Rock Hard	8.0/10

The album debuted at No. 5 on Billboard 200, and No. 1 on Top Rock Albums. with around 25,000 copies sold in its first week. The album has sold 80,000 copies in the US as of March 2016.

== Track listing ==
All tracks are written by Zakk Wylde.

No.	Title	Length
1.	"Fields of Unforgiveness"	3:12
2.	"My Dying Time"	3:22
3.	"Believe"	3:44
4.	"Angel of Mercy"	4:14
5.	"Heart of Darkness"	3:39
6.	"Beyond the Down"	2:54
7.	"Scars"	4:13
8.	"Damn the Flood"	3:18
9.	"I've Gone Away"	3:51
10.	"Empty Promises"	5:16
11.	"Shades of Gray"	6:28
Total length:		44:39

'Black Edition' bonus tracks - Europe
No.	Title	Length
12.	"Dark Side of the Sun"	5:19
13.	"Blind Man"	4:36

'Black Edition' bonus tracks - North America/digital
No.	Title	Length
12.	"Dark Side of the Sun"	5:19
13.	"The Nomad"	4:15

Bonus tracks - Japan
No.	Title	Length
12.	"Dark Side of the Sun"	5:19
13.	"Hell and Fire"	4:25

== Personnel ==
- Zakk Wylde – guitars, lead vocals, piano, acoustic guitar
- John DeServio – bass, backing vocals
- Chad Szeliga – drums

== Charts ==
Chart (2014)	Peak position
Australian Albums (ARIA)	31
Austrian Albums (Ö3 Austria)	45
Belgian Albums (Ultratop Flanders)	111
Belgian Albums (Ultratop Wallonia)	59
Canadian Albums (Billboard)	4
Dutch Albums (Album Top 100)	23
Finnish Albums (Suomen virallinen lista)	12
French Albums (SNEP)	64
German Albums (Offizielle Top 100)	29
Italian Albums (FIMI)	87
Swedish Albums (Sverigetopplistan)	52
UK Albums (OCC)	30
US Billboard 200	5
US Top Hard Rock Albums (Billboard)	1
US Independent Albums (Billboard)	1
US Top Rock Albums (Billboard)	1
US Indie Store Album Sales (Billboard)	3
