= Grimmest Hits =

Studio album by Black Label Society
- Released: January 19, 2018
- Genre: Heavy metal; southern metal; hard rock
- Length: 55:52
- Label: eOne

Black Label Society chronology
Catacombs of the Black Vatican (2014)	Grimmest Hits (2018)	Doom Crew Inc. (2021)

Singles from Grimmest Hits
- 1. "Room of Nightmares" Released: October 2, 2017

Grimmest Hits is the tenth studio album by American heavy metal band Black Label Society. The album was released on January 19, 2018. According to AllMusic, the sound of the album was inspired by Black Sabbath and Led Zeppelin. Despite its title, the album is not a greatest hits album. Zakk Wylde admitted in an interview with Billboard that he "just wanted to confuse people".

The album reached No. 1 on the Billboard Hard Music, No. 1 Independent, and No. 2 Rock Charts. The album was also the No. 1 selling album at Best Buy for the week of its release, beating out Grammy-nominated Fall Out Boy by a considerable margin. Upon its release, the album landed at #1 spot on iTunes Top Rock Albums Chart and No. 7 on the Overall Top Albums Chart.

== Promotion ==
In Spring 2018, Black Label Society collaborated with Corrosion of Conformity, Eyehategod, and Red Fang to promote the Grimmest Hits album. On February 26, 2020, the band performed Grimmest Hits at the North American Crusade tour in Tucson, Arizona.

== Reception ==
Professional ratings
Review scores
Source	Rating
All About the Rock	6.8/10
AllMusic	3.5/5 stars
Blabbermouth.net	8/10
Distorted Sound	8/10
Ghost Cult	7/10
Hysteria	8/10
Maximum Volume Music	9/10
Metal.de	7/10
Metal Express Radio	6.5/10
Metal Hammer	3.5/5 stars
The Spill Magazine	4/5 stars
The Music	
The Rogers Revue	A

Blabbermouth.net called Grimmest Hits a "partial excuse" for Zakk Wylde to show his affection for Ozzy [Ozbourne] and Black Sabbath.

Blair K. Rose of All About the Rock said that Grimmest Hits "carries on the torch rather proudly". The Moshville Times said that the album "doesn't reinvent the Black Label Society wheel", and mentioning that "it's not their finest hour". Martien Koolen called Grimmest Hits "Black Label Society's best album".

== Track listing ==
All tracks are written by Zakk Wylde.

No.	Title	Length
1.	"Trampled Down Below"	5:04
2.	"Seasons of Falter"	4:00
3.	"The Betrayal"	3:48
4.	"All That Once Shined"	3:54
5.	"The Only Words"	5:29
6.	"Room of Nightmares"	2:31
7.	"A Love Unreal"	6:00
8.	"Disbelief"	5:28
9.	"The Day That Heaven Had Gone Away"	6:12
10.	"Illusions of Peace"	4:07
11.	"Bury Your Sorrow"	4:41
12.	"Nothing Left to Say"	4:22
Total length:		55:36

Japanese CD bonus tracks
No.	Title	Length
13.	"Disbelief (Unblackened Version)"	5:08
14.	"The Only Words (Unblackened Version)"	3:49
Total length:		64:35

== Personnel ==
- Zakk Wylde – guitars, vocals, piano, acoustic guitar
- John DeServio – bass
- Jeff Fabb – drums

== Charts ==
Chart performance for Grimmest Hits
Chart (2018)	Peak position
Australian Albums (ARIA)	30
Austrian Albums (Ö3 Austria)	26
German Albums (Offizielle Top 100)	21
Finnish Albums (Suomen virallinen lista)	50
Belgian Albums (Ultratop Flanders)	116
French Albums (SNEP)	132
Italian Albums (FIMI)	88
Japanese Albums (Oricon)	130
Dutch Albums (Album Top 100)	133
Spanish Albums (Promusicae)	74
Swiss Albums (Schweizer Hitparade)	25
Belgian Albums (Ultratop Wallonia)	97
US Billboard 200	29
US Independent Albums (Billboard)	1
US Top Hard Rock Albums (Billboard)	1
US Top Rock Albums (Billboard)	3
