= Doom Crew Inc. =

Studio album by Black Label Society
- Released: November 26, 2021
- Genres: Heavy metal; southern metal; hard rock
- Length: 63:07
- Label: eOne

Black Label Society chronology
Grimmest Hits (2018)	Doom Crew Inc. (2021)	Engines of Demolition (2026)

Singles from Doom Crew Inc.
- 1. "Set You Free" Released: August 23, 2021

Professional ratings
Review scores
Source	Rating
Blabbermouth.net	8.5/10
Kerrang!	3/5
Sputnikmusic	3/5
Metal.de	7/10
Metal Hammer Germany	6/7
Distorted Sound	8/10

Doom Crew Inc. is the eleventh studio album by American heavy metal band Black Label Society. It was released on November 26, 2021. This was the first album to feature rhythm guitarist Dario Lorina.

== Track listing ==
All tracks are written by Zakk Wylde.

No.	Title	Length
1.	"Set You Free"	3:58
2.	"Destroy & Conquer"	4:41
3.	"You Made Me Want to Live"	4:31
4.	"Forever and a Day"	4:09
5.	"End of Days"	5:22
6.	"Ruins"	5:47
7.	"Forsaken"	5:54
8.	"Love Reign Down"	5:48
9.	"Gospel of Lies"	6:32
10.	"Shelter Me"	5:28
11.	"Gather All My Sins"	4:18
12.	"Farewell Ballad"	6:39
Total length:		63:07

== Personnel ==
- Zakk Wylde – lead guitar, vocals, piano, acoustic guitar
- Dario Lorina – rhythm guitar
- John DeServio – bass
- Jeff Fabb – drums
