= Pride & Glory (band) =

American rock band

- Pride & Glory in 1994

Background information
- Origin: United States
- Genres: Hard rock; southern rock; southern metal
- Years active: 1991–1994 (one-off reunion: 1998)
- Labels: Geffen
- Past members: Zakk Wylde; James LoMenzo; Greg D'Angelo; Brian Tichy; John DeServio

Pride & Glory was a side project formed by vocalist/guitarist Zakk Wylde (previously of Ozzy Osbourne) and White Lion members James LoMenzo and Greg D'Angelo. It was the first project for which Wylde also served as lead vocalist, prior to releasing his first solo-album, 1996's Book of Shadows. Wylde subsequently formed the band Black Label Society in 1998, which remains active.

Pride & Glory released one self-titled studio album before disbanding in 1994. They reunited for a one-off show in 1998.

== History ==
Formed in 1991 during what was then billed as Ozzy Osbourne's farewell tour following the 1991 No More Tears album, Wylde recruited the former White Lion rhythm section of bassist James LoMenzo and drummer Greg D'Angelo, and originally wanted to name the Southern rock-inspired project Lynyrd Skynhead. This lineup recorded two songs, an instrumental entitled "Farm Fiddlin'" for a 1991 compilation album entitled The Guitars That Rule the World, and a cover of the blues-standard "Baby, Please Don't Go" for the 1992 L.A. Blues Authority Vol. 1 compilation.

By early 1994, the band had changed their name to Pride & Glory, with D'Angelo departing and being replaced by Brian Tichy. That year, Pride & Glory released their one and only album via Geffen Records and performed as a main-stage act at the Donington Monsters of Rock Festival in England in June of that year. In November 1994, LoMenzo left after a tour of Japan, three days before Pride & Glory was scheduled to begin a US Tour. Scrambling, Wylde quickly managed to find a replacement in the form of his longtime friend John DeServio, who grew up with Wylde in New Jersey. Pride & Glory played their final show on December 10, 1994, in Los Angeles.

Following the 1994 demise of the Pride & Glory project, Wylde would intermittently perform with Osbourne again while also forming the band Black Label Society in 1998, for which he also serves as lead vocalist.

=== 1998 reunion show ===
On January 31, 1998, the lineup of Wylde, LoMenzo, and Tichy reunited for a one-off reunion show at the Whisky a Go Go in Hollywood.

== Band members ==
- Zakk Wylde – lead vocals, guitar, mandolin, banjo, harmonica, piano (1991–1994, 1998)
- James LoMenzo – bass, backing vocals (1991–1994, 1998)
- John DeServio – bass, backing vocals (1994)
- Greg D'Angelo – drums, percussion (1991–1993)
- Brian Tichy – drums, percussion (1994, 1998)

== Discography ==
=== Studio albums ===
- Pride & Glory (1994)

=== Singles ===
- "Losin' Your Mind" (1994)
- "Horse Called War" (1994)
- "Troubled Wine" (1994)

=== Additional recordings ===
(Lynyrd Skynhead recordings credited as 'Zakk Wylde')

- "Farm Fiddlin'" - Guitars That Rule the World (1991)
- "Baby, Please Don't Go" - L.A. Blues Authority Vol. 1 (1992)

=== Compilation appearances ===
- Black Label Society - No More Tears Sampler (1999)
- Black Label Society - Kings of Damnation 98–04 (2005)
- Black Label Society - Skullage (2009)
