= Losin' Your Mind =

Single by Pride & Glory

from the album Pride & Glory
- Released: 1994
- Genre: Southern rock, heavy metal
- Length: 5:33
- Label: Geffen
- Songwriter: Zakk Wylde
- Producer: Rick Parashar

Pride & Glory singles chronology
"Losin' Your Mind" (1994)	"Horse Called War" (1994)

"Losin' Your Mind" is the first single from the self-titled debut album by American rock band Pride & Glory. A music video was produced for the song, recorded in the swamps of New Orleans.

== Overview ==
The song's opening notes are played on a banjo, which guitarist/vocalist Zakk Wylde hoped would produce a contrast making the guitar part sound heavier. "I had the initial riff which lent itself well to banjo. After first trying it on acoustic, I thought, 'Let's put the banjo on there and then have the band come crushing in", he recalled.

The song was heavily influenced by the Southern rock Wylde grew up listening to. "That all comes from my love of Cream, The Allman Brothers, Skynyrd and The Marshall Tucker Band. I really love that style of music", he stated.

== Track listing ==
1. "Losin' Your Mind" (album version) - 5:33
2. "Losin' Your Mind" (edit) - 4:37

== Personnel ==
- Zakk Wylde - vocals, guitar, banjo
- James Lomenzo - bass
- Brian Tichy - drums

== Charts ==
Chart (1994)	Peak position
US Mainstream Rock (Billboard)	14

== In popular media ==
- The song was featured in the series 5 episode of Beavis and Butt-Head entitled 'Walking Erect'.
