= Engines of Demolition =

Studio album by Black Label Society
- Released: March 27, 2026
- Length: 51:40
- Label: MNRK
- Producers: John DeServio; Adam Fuller; Zakk Wylde

Black Label Society chronology
Doom Crew Inc. (2021)	Engines of Demolition (2026)

Singles from Engines of Demolition
- 1. "The Gallows" Released: September 10, 2024; 2. "Lord Humungus" Released: February 21, 2025; 3. "Broken and Blind" Released: October 9, 2025; 4. "Name in Blood" Released: January 14, 2026

Engines of Demolition is the twelfth studio album by American heavy metal band Black Label Society. The album was released on March 27, 2026, by MNRK. The nearly five years since Doom Crew Inc. makes it the longest gap between studio albums in the band's career.

== Background ==
Shortly after the release of Doom Crew Inc., Zakk Wylde began touring with Pantera as their touring guitarist in 2022. It was also at this time that Wylde began writing the songs for Engines of Demolition, which he continued until 2025.

On September 10, 2024, Black Label Society released the first single for their twelfth studio album entitled "The Gallows". On February 21, 2025, Black Label Society released the second single "Lord Humungus". On October 9, the band released the third single "Broken and Blind".

On January 14, 2026, Black Label Society announced their twelfth studio album Engines of Demolition and its fourth single "Name in Blood". The song "Ozzy's Song" serves as a tribute to Ozzy Osbourne.

== Critical reception ==
Professional ratings
Aggregate scores
Source	Rating
Metacritic	72/100
Review scores
Source	Rating
AllMusic	3.5/5 stars
Blabbermouth.net	8/10
Distorted Sound	5/10
Kerrang!	3/5
The Spill Magazine	3.5/5 stars

According to the review aggregator Metacritic, Engines of Demolition received "generally favorable reviews" based on a weighted average score of 72 out of 100 from 4 critic scores.

== Track listing ==
All tracks are written by Zakk Wylde.

No.	Title	Length
1.	"Name in Blood"	4:36
2.	"Gatherer of Souls"	3:35
3.	"The Hand of Tomorrows Grave"	4:03
4.	"Better Days & Wiser Times"	5:35
5.	"Broken and Blind"	3:12
6.	"The Gallows"	3:52
7.	"Above & Below"	3:27
8.	"Back to Me"	3:34
9.	"Lord Humungus"	3:34
10.	"Pedal to the Floor"	4:34
11.	"Broken Pieces"	2:55
12.	"The Stranger"	3:09
13.	"Ozzy's Song"	5:28
Total length:		51:40

Digital Bonus Tracks
No.	Title	Length
14.	"Name In Blood (Unblackened)"	4:11
15.	"Lord Humungus (Unblackened)"	3:47
16.	"Broken Pieces (Unblackened)"	3:06
17.	"Back To Me (Unblackened)"	3:29
18.	"Name In Blood (Live at Apple Music Radio)"	3:54
19.	"Back To Me (Live at Apple Music Radio)"	2:52

== Personnel ==
- Zakk Wylde – lead guitar, vocals, Hammond organ, piano
- Dario Lorina – rhythm guitar
- John DeServio – bass
- Jeff Fabb – drums

=== Production ===
- Zakk Wylde – production, mixing
- John DeServio – production
- Adam Fuller – production, mixing

== Charts ==
Chart performance for Engines of Demolition
Chart (2026)	Peak position
Australian Albums (ARIA)	61
Austrian Albums (Ö3 Austria)	11
Belgian Albums (Ultratop Flanders)	87
Belgian Albums (Ultratop Wallonia)	44
French Albums (SNEP)	102
French Rock & Metal Albums (SNEP)	4
German Albums (Offizielle Top 100)	10
German Rock & Metal Albums (Offizielle Top 100)	5
Japanese Download Albums (Billboard Japan)	52
Japanese Western Albums (Oricon)	24
Polish Albums (ZPAV)	16
Scottish Albums (Official Charts)	12
Swedish Hard Rock Albums (Sverigetopplistan)	12
Swiss Albums (Schweizer Hitparade)	14
UK Albums (Official Charts)	61
UK Rock & Metal Albums (Official Charts)	2
US Billboard 200	31
US Independent Albums (Billboard)	7
US Top Rock & Alternative Albums (Billboard)	4
