= In This River =

Single by Black Label Society

from the album Mafia
- Released: September 2005
- Length: 3:54
- Label: Artemis
- Songwriter(s): Zakk Wylde
- Producer(s): Zakk Wylde

Black Label Society singles chronology
| "Fire It Up" (2005) | "In This River" (2005) | "Concrete Jungle" (2006) |

"In This River" is a song by American heavy metal band Black Label Society, a power ballad featured on their 2005 sixth studio album Mafia. Performed entirely by guitarist, vocalist and pianist Zakk Wylde (who also wrote and produced the song), it was released as the third single from the album and reached number 32 on the Billboard Hot Mainstream Rock Tracks chart.

== Dedication to Dimebag Darrell ==
A common misconception is that Wylde wrote the song as a tribute to his close friend "Dimebag" Darrell Abbott (former guitarist for bands Pantera and Damageplan), who was killed on December 8, 2004. In fact, he wrote the song many months prior to the incident, and subsequently began dedicating the song to him. On the topic of dedication, Wylde explains that he "was looking at the lyrics, and I just said 'Man, this has gotta be Dime's tune', so we just made it Dime's song and that's how the video came about. I think it's really emotional and it came out great. Everyone loves it – Vinnie Paul Abbott (Darrell's brother), Rita (Darrell's girlfriend). It's all about Dime's memory and there ain't a dry eye in the house every time you see it." Wylde also states that every time he plays a show, "it will never leave the Black Label set." During the "Pedal to the Metal" concert series, however, the song was not included in the set.

== Music video ==
The music video for "In This River" features the childhood personage of Wylde and Abbott riding bicycles together and diving into a river while Wylde plays both the piano and the guitar in a creek. Midway through, Zakk destroys the piano with an axe and then sets it on fire with a torch before performing the solo. At the end of the video, only the adult version of Wylde emerges, symbolizing Darrell's death. Wylde explains that "The river is a metaphor for life in general, all the bullshit that you deal with from being a kid growing up. The whole thing's just about life and death."
