= Pride & Glory (album) =

Studio album by Pride & Glory
- Released: 7 June 1994
- Recorded: 1994
- Genres: Southern rock; hard rock
- Length: 70:08
- Label: Geffen
- Producer: Rick Parashar

Zakk Wylde chronology
Pride & Glory (1994)	Book of Shadows (1996)

Professional ratings
Review scores
Source	Rating
AllMusic	4/5 stars

Pride & Glory is the only studio album by American rock band Pride & Glory. The band was fronted by guitarist/vocalist Zakk Wylde, best known for his prior work as a member of Ozzy Osbourne's band. The tracks "Troubled Wine", "Losin' Your Mind", and "Horse Called War" were all released as singles. Pride & Glory was re-released in 1999 on Spitfire Records with a bonus disc of rare and unreleased material.

== Overview ==
Pride & Glory was received with surprise by many listeners, with a sound highly influenced by Southern rock which was a complete departure from Wylde's previous work with metal icon Ozzy Osbourne. He has said that there was a conscious effort to make an album that fans wouldn't immediately associate with Osbourne's music. The album "felt more like Cream, three guys in a room doing some improv, meets The Allman Brothers. Or even The Jimi Hendrix Experience, a power trio going through a ton of jamming", said Wylde of the short-lived project, adding that the album was largely recorded live in the studio with few overdubs added later. During the same time period, Wylde was toying with the idea of joining Guns N' Roses, and his brief involvement with that band as well as the Pride and Glory project led to him giving up his spot in Osbourne's band. Wylde has said that many observers expressed the sentiment that it was very unwise to leave the security of Osbourne's band to essentially start again as a club act with Pride and Glory. "I'm not in this for a rock star lifestyle. I'm in it to play my guitar," he said of the criticism he received. Following the release of the 1993 live album Live & Loud and Osbourne's subsequent farewell tour, Wylde believed a new band was his only way forward, saying in 1994 "It's been over a year since I toured with (Osbourne) and I didn't want to be in a rocking chair before I made my own record." Osbourne "understood what I had to do", according to the guitarist.

The album cover is a photograph of an abandoned house outside of Belfast, Maine.

== Recording ==
Wylde selected producer Rick Parashar due to his prior work on the Temple of the Dog and Blind Melon albums. "Those records are really organic in the sense that there's really not much production – you're hearing the band, just like those classic '70s recordings", he said. The recording of Pride & Glory was a pleasant experience for all involved, with Wylde recalling "Looking back, this record was a ton of laughs and I remember waking up every day, having a coffee and looking forward to getting back in there. Or if we'd been berserkin' all night, I might have cracked open another cold one, picked up the acoustic and come out with something like 'Lovin' Woman'." He has listed the album tracks "Sweet Jesus", "Fadin' Away", "The Chosen One", "Cry Me a River", "Lovin' Woman", and "Losin' Your Mind" as his favorites from the album.

In the studio, Wylde used essentially the same gear for the album he had been using in Osbourne's band since 1991's No More Tears. "It was pretty much just two Les Pauls, 'The Grail' and 'The Rebel', basically my Ozzy gear. The same as on No More Tears. I didn't really bother changing anything. I have friends that are complete tone-chasers and gear hounds… while for me, if it works fine, let's use it again", he said. Wylde used a Gibson Dove for the album's acoustic parts. Marshall amps dating from the early 1980s, Wylde's personal preference, were used on the album: "That's what's great about those Marshalls. You plug in, they work and you're ready to record. I used my Dunlop wah - it was probably the standard as my signature one didn't come out 'til later. I think I used a Boss SD-1 for extra distortion; that was about it."

Wylde wrote the song "The Chosen One" as a tribute to his father, a war hero who died shortly after the album's release. Upon hearing the song, Wylde jokingly said his father punched him in the face and told him the song was terrible. "Then he said, 'Go upstairs and clean your room, then get out of the house because you and [wife] Barbaranne are staying at the Ramada tonight!' He told me next time I wrote him a song to make it better than that pile of shit, haha!", said Wylde.

The 1999 reissue features a cover of The Beatles' "Come Together". Said Wylde of the song: "I think we listened to the original in the control room, talking about how great the recording was and how flat and dead the drums were, though the rest of the band are really in your face and present. I started noodling on the piano, doing the 'Come Together' thing and then we just tracked in D minor. The saddest of all keys! We were drinking and having a good time, so we figured we might as well add that in there, too." Wylde said he preferred adding several cover songs to the reissue because he wanted to save his new original songs for his next album. "A lot of the time, people don't actually get round to hearing bonus tracks. Plus covers are fun to do anyway, playing music made by bands you love…", he said.

== Reception ==
The album has received predominantly positive reviews. Guitar World gave the album a positive review, calling it "a wild, wide-ranging romp" while applauding the "headbanging heavy metal stampers (that) rub shoulders with swampy Southern rockers. AllMusic has referred to the album as "a surprisingly solid debut" while complimenting Wylde's guitar playing and songwriting.

== Track listing ==
All songs written by Zakk Wylde, except where noted.

No.	Title	Length
1.	"Losin' Your Mind"	5:28
2.	"Horse Called War"	5:00
3.	"Shine On"	6:44
4.	"Lovin' Woman"	3:46
5.	"Harvester of Pain"	5:06
6.	"The Chosen One"	6:49
7.	"Sweet Jesus"	3:48
8.	"Troubled Wine"	5:39
9.	"Machine Gun Man"	4:56
10.	"Cry Me a River"	4:37
11.	"Toe'n the Line"	5:19
12.	"Found a Friend"	6:03
13.	"Fadin' Away"	4:56
14.	"The Wizard" (Black Sabbath cover)	4:44
15.	"Hate Your Guts"	4:36
Total length:		70:08

Track 14 is a Japanese release bonus track.

== Reissue track listing ==
All songs written by Zakk Wylde, except where noted.

=== Disc one ===
No.	Title	Length
1.	"Losin' Your Mind"	5:28
2.	"Horse Called War"	5:00
3.	"Shine On"	6:44
4.	"Lovin' Woman"	3:46
5.	"Harvester of Pain"	5:06
6.	"The Chosen One"	6:49
7.	"Sweet Jesus"	3:48
8.	"Troubled Wine"	5:39
9.	"Machine Gun Man"	4:56
10.	"Cry Me a River"	4:37
11.	"Toe'n the Line"	5:19
12.	"Found a Friend"	6:03
13.	"Fadin' Away"	4:56
14.	"Hate Your Guts"	4:36
Total length:		74:41

=== Disc two ===
No.	Title	Length
1.	"The Wizard" (Black Sabbath cover)	4:44
2.	"Torn and Tattered"	5:45
3.	"In My Time of Dyin'" (As made famous by Led Zeppelin)	7:30
4.	"The Hammer & the Nail"	2:38
5.	"Come Together" (The Beatles cover)	3:55
Total length:		24:32

== Personnel ==
Pride & Glory

- Zakk Wylde – lead and backing vocals, guitars, piano, mandolin, banjo, harmonica
- James LoMenzo – bass, backing vocals, double bass, twelve-string guitar on "Fadin' Away"
- Brian Tichy – drums, percussion

Additional musicians

- Paul Buckmaster – musical arrangements on "The Chosen One", "Sweet Jesus", and "Fadin' Away"
- Featuring the Seattle Symphony conducted by Paul Buckmaster

Production

- Produced by Rick Parashar
- Engineered and mixed by Rick Parashar and Jon Plum
- "Losin' Your Mind" and "Toe'n the Line" mixed by Kelly Gray, Rick Parashar, and Jon Plum
- "Cry Me a River" produced by Pride & Glory and Greg Goldman, engineered and mixed by Greg Goldman with assistant engineer John Aguto
- Mastered by George Marino

== Charts ==
Chart (1994)	Peak position
US Billboard 200	173
