= Mafia (Black Label Society album) =

Studio album by Black Label Society
- Released: March 8, 2005
- Genres: Heavy metal; Southern metal; groove metal; hard rock
- Length: 47:50
- Label: Artemis
- Producer: Zakk Wylde

Black Label Society chronology
Hangover Music Vol. VI (2004)	Mafia (2005)	Kings of Damnation 98–04 (2005)

Singles from Mafia
- 1. "Suicide Messiah" Released: February 15, 2005; 2. "Fire It Up" Released: May 19, 2005; 3. "In This River" Released: September 1, 2005

Professional ratings
Review scores
Source	Rating
AllMusic	3.5/5 stars

Mafia is the sixth studio album by American heavy metal band Black Label Society, released on March 8, 2005, by Artemis Records. It is one of the band's most commercially successful releases, selling over 250,000 copies in the United States. The track "In This River" was written before the death of Zakk Wylde's friend and fellow guitarist Dimebag Darrell, but it has since been dedicated to him. In 2005, the album was ranked number 15 on Billboard Album Chart.

== Track listing ==
All tracks are written by Zakk Wylde, except where noted.

Mafia track listing
No.	Title	Length
1.	"Fire It Up"	4:59
2.	"What's In You"	3:00
3.	"Suicide Messiah"	5:47
4.	"Forever Down"	3:39
5.	"In This River"	3:52
6.	"You Must Be Blind"	3:27
7.	"Death March"	3:05
8.	"Dr. Octavia" (instrumental)	0:50
9.	"Say What You Will"	3:46
10.	"Too Tough to Die"	2:50
11.	"Electric Hellfire"	2:28
12.	"Spread Your Wings"	4:09
13.	"Been a Long Time"	3:07
14.	"Dirt on the Grave"	2:51
Total length:		47:50

Bonus track
No.	Title	Length
1.	"I Never Dreamed" (Lynyrd Skynyrd cover)	6:08

The track "Fire It Up" was featured in the 2005 video game Guitar Hero. The end of "Death March" quotes the intro to "Fire It Up".

== Personnel ==
Black Label Society

- Zakk Wylde – guitars, vocals, bass, talk box, Minimoog, piano, PolyBox
- James LoMenzo – bass, vocal break on "Say What You Will"
- Craig Nunenmacher – drums, shaker

Additional performances

- Barry "Lord" Conley – Buchla synthesizer, Minimoog, piano, PolyBox, OutofControl-atron
- Eddie Mapp – Minimoog on "Say What You Will"

Production

- Produced by Zakk Wylde
- Associate producer and engineer – Barry Conley
- Mixed by Eddie Mapp and Barry Conley
- Mastered by Steve Marcussen
- Artwork concept – Zakk Wylde
- Illustrations – Rob "RA" Arvizu
- Artwork layout and design – Jason Levy (NoLimitAmerica.com)
- Management – Bob Ringe (Survival Management)

== Charts ==
Chart performance for Mafia
Chart (2005)	Peak position
Finnish Albums (Suomen virallinen lista)	33
French Albums (SNEP)	170
Swedish Albums (Sverigetopplistan)	17
US Billboard 200	15
US Independent Albums (Billboard)	1

=== Album ===
Billboard (United States)

Year	Chart	Position
2005	Top Internet Albums	15

=== Singles ===
Billboard (United States)

Year	Single	Chart	Position
2005	"Suicide Messiah"	Mainstream Rock Tracks	24
2005	"Fire It Up"	Mainstream Rock Tracks	35
2005	"In This River"	Mainstream Rock Tracks	32
