= Shot to Hell =

Studio album by Black Label Society
- Released: September 12, 2006
- Recorded: 2006
- Studio: Ameraycan Studios (Hollywood, California)
- Genre: Heavy metal; Southern metal; hard rock
- Length: 44:04
- Label: Roadrunner
- Producer: Zakk Wylde, Michael Beinhorn

Black Label Society chronology
The European Invasion – Doom Troopin' Live (2006)	Shot to Hell (2006)	Skullage (2009)

Shot to Hell is the seventh studio album by American heavy metal band Black Label Society. It was released September 12, 2006, and was the band's first record released by Roadrunner Records.

== Track listing ==
All tracks are written by Zakk Wylde.

No.	Title	Length
1.	"Concrete Jungle"	3:24
2.	"Black Mass Reverends"	2:37
3.	"Blacked Out World"	3:16
4.	"The Last Goodbye"	4:04
5.	"Give Yourself to Me"	3:18
6.	"Nothing's the Same"	3:01
7.	"Hell Is High"	3:32
8.	"New Religion"	4:36
9.	"Sick of It All"	3:55
10.	"Faith Is Blind"	3:36
11.	"Blood Is Thicker Than Water"	2:58
12.	"Devil's Dime"	2:16
13.	"Lead Me to Your Door"	3:33
Total length:		44:04

== Production ==
According to Zakk Wylde, the band "just came in here and started knocking it out. That's how you make records."

The cover art was originally of three nuns with shotguns (as seen in the advertisements handed out at Ozzfest 2006), but it was deemed inappropriate and was changed to three nuns playing a game of pool. The version with shotguns was used as the cover of the "Concrete Jungle" single.

== Reception ==
Professional ratings
Review scores
Source	Rating
AllMusic	3/5 stars
Blabbermouth.net	7.5/10
Metal.de	8/10
Rock Hard	8.5/10

According to AllMusic, despite the band's change of label, "not much has changed artistically, no doubt to the relief of fans. Over the course of 13 songs, the band showcases impressive musicianship, incorporating occasional moodiness and balladic touches into its otherwise charging style of metal. The usual comparisons to Alice in Chains, Pantera, and Corrosion of Conformity are as apt as ever."

According to Blabbermouth.net, "Shot to Hell will not cause [the band] to lose fans, even with the abundance of ballads this time around. In fact, it is easier to listen to Shot to Hell in one sitting because of the song variety....Shot to Hell is probably more of what you expect with just a hint of progression."

Rock Hard gave a more positive summary, stating that the band had acquired a greater sense of its own style, with groovy mid-speed hits. The review noted that there was an unneeded absence of complexity.

== Personnel ==
Black Label Society

- Zakk Wylde – guitars, vocals, talk box, piano, keyboards, mellotron, organ
- John DeServio – bass
- Craig Nunenmacher – drums

Production

- Produced by Zakk Wylde
- Executive producer – Michael Beinhorn
- Associate producers and engineers – Barry Conley, David Allen
- Mixed by Randy Staub, except "Faith Is Blind", mixed by Dave Allen
- Mastered by Ted Jensen
- Management – Bob Ringe (Survival Management)
- Assistant management – Barbaranne Wylde
- Founding Father (A&R) – Mike Gitter
- Artwork concept – Zakk Wylde, Barbaranne Wylde
- Artwork production – Barbaranne Wylde
- Artwork photography – Neil Zlozower
- Artwork design and layout – Rob "RA" Arvizuae
- Artwork casting – Deborah German Casting
- Wardrobe – Bobbie Mannix
- Makeup – Ralis Kahn
- Nuns – Pat McNeely, Mary Lou Secor, Nan Taylor
- Devils – Frank Bettag, David Case, Richard Summers

== Charts ==
Chart performance for Shot to Hell
Chart (2006)	Peak position
US Billboard 200	21
US Top Hard Rock Albums (Billboard)	18

=== Singles ===
Billboard (North America)

Year	Single	Chart	Position
2006	"Concrete Jungle"	Mainstream Rock Tracks	29
2007	"Blood Is Thicker Than Water"	Mainstream Rock Tracks	31
