= Black Label Society =

American heavy metal band

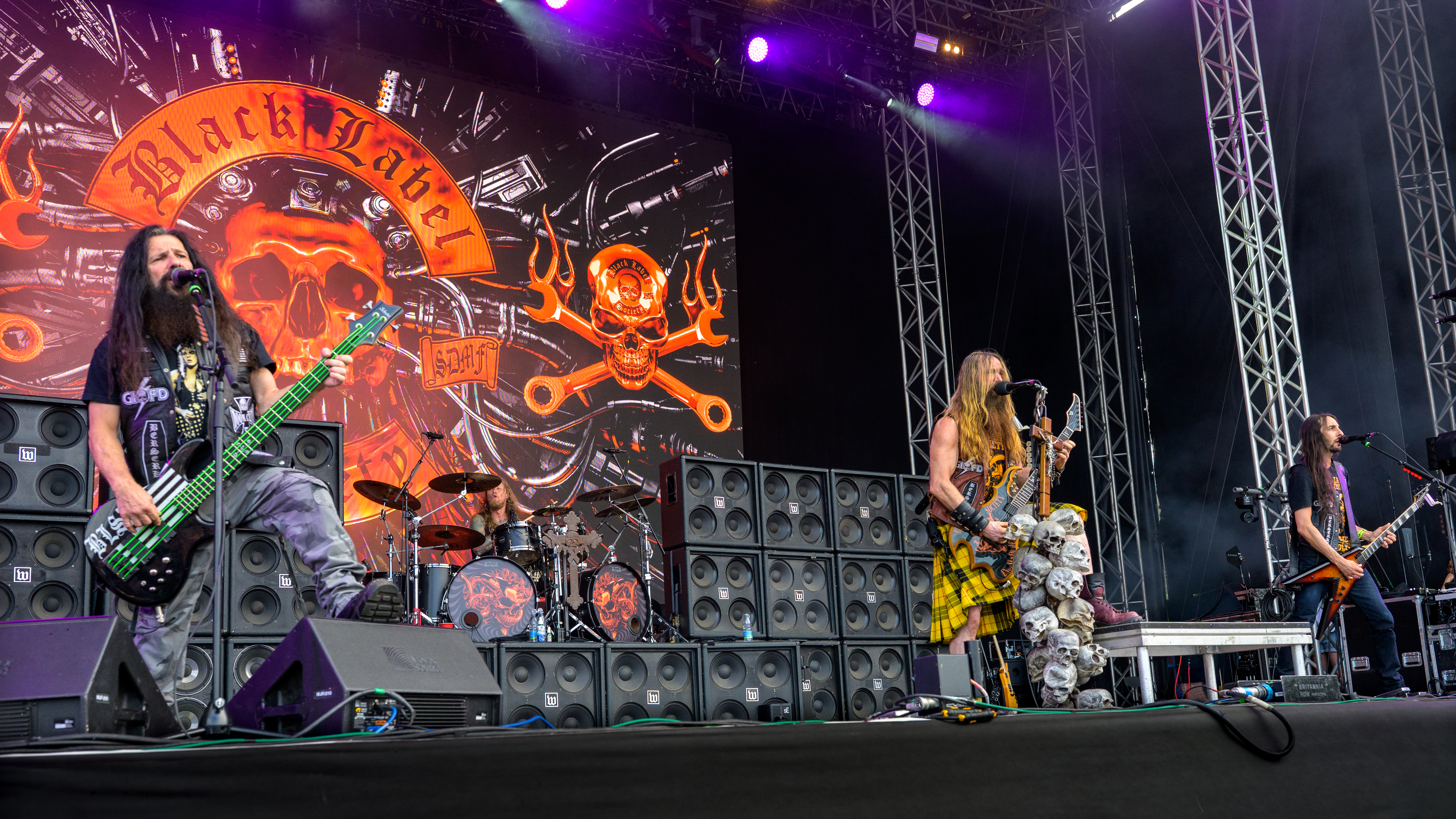
- Black Label Society performing at Tons of Rock in 2026

Background information
- Origin: Los Angeles, California, U.S.
- Genres: Heavy metal; southern metal; hard rock; groove metal; biker metal
- Years active: 1998–present
- Labels: Black Label; Spitfire; Artemis; Roadrunner; E1
- Spinoff of: Pride & Glory
- Members: Zakk Wylde; John DeServio; Dario Lorina; Jeff Fabb
- Past members: Phil Ondich; Nick Catanese; Steve Gibb; Mike Inez; James LoMenzo; Craig Nunenmacher; Will Hunt; Chad Szeliga
- Website: blacklabelsociety.com; zakkwylde.com

Black Label Society is an American heavy metal band formed in Los Angeles in 1998 by guitarist/singer Zakk Wylde. To date, the band has released twelve studio albums, two live albums, two compilation albums, one EP, and three video albums.

== History ==
=== Sonic Brew and formation (1998–1999) ===
In the early 1990s, Wylde had formed his own solo band Pride & Glory, playing a mixture of bluesy Southern rock with heavy metal. However, they disbanded in December 1994 after having released only one album. Wylde subsequently recorded an acoustic solo album, Book of Shadows (1996). In May 1998, after limited commercial success with Book of Shadows, Wylde and drummer Phil Ondich recorded what became Black Label Society's debut album Sonic Brew. It was decided, rather than the album being another solo album for Wylde, that they would form a long term band. It was known from the start that Nick Catanese would be retained as the second guitarist in the band (Catanese previously toured as rhythm guitarist for the Book of Shadows tour). John DeServio, who previously worked with Wylde as a temporary replacement in Pride & Glory, joined as the band's bassist for the album's tour.

Sonic Brew was released in Japan on October 28, 1998. Due to delays in signing with a record label (Spitfire Records), the album was not released in the rest of the world until May 4, 1999.

=== Lineup changes and subsequent releases (1999–2007) ===
The band's second album Stronger Than Death followed in 2000, with DeServio being replaced by Steve Gibb. Craig Nunenmacher replaced Ondich in July 2000, with his debut recording with the band being the live album Alcohol Fueled Brewtality Live +5. This was followed by 1919 Eternal, which was dedicated to Wylde's father and was released in 2002. Steve Gibb was temporarily replaced by Mike Inez (Alice In Chains) during the Ozzfest 2001 tour, and then Robert Trujillo took over bass duties for the band the next year.

In 2003, Trujillo joined Metallica, leaving the bass position in Black Label Society open, which left room for Inez to rejoin the band for a short two-week tour, supporting the band's album The Blessed Hellride. James LoMenzo joined the band in 2004 after the release of Hangover Music Vol. VI, which was the band's last release for Spitfire Records.

On the first four studio albums, Wylde played every instrument, except for the drums, including vocals, guitars, piano, and bass guitar.

In 2005, after the band signed with Artemis Records, the album Mafia was released. In October, LoMenzo left the band (and joined Megadeth a few months later) and was replaced by the band's original bassist, John DeServio. In 2006, the band left Artemis Records and signed to Roadrunner Records, releasing the album Shot to Hell.

In June 2007, Black Label Society parted ways with Roadrunner Records.

=== Side bands and lineup changes (2007–present) ===
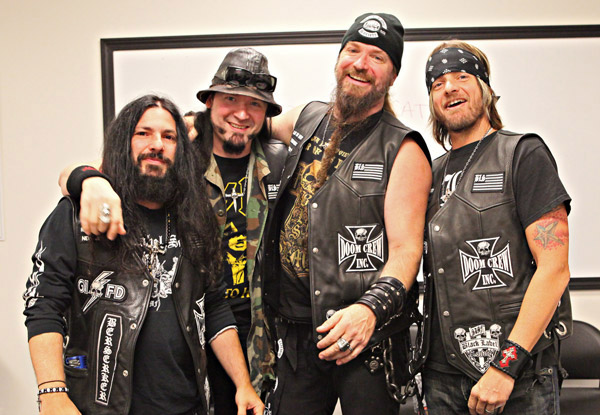
Black Label Society in 2010

In July 2007, band members DeServio and Catanese both signaled the start of new bands as Zakk Wylde toured with Ozzy Osbourne. Drummer Craig Nunenmacher left the band in February 2010, and was replaced by Will Hunt (of Dark New Day, Evanescence). Hunt's first live performance with the band would be on July 24, 2010, at the first edition of the High Voltage Festival in London.

On August 10, 2010, Order of the Black, their eighth studio album, was released. It reached number 4 on the Billboard 200 chart.

In 2011 the band toured in support of their new album. The Black Label Berzerkus tour started in Portland, Oregon, with Children of Bodom and Clutch sharing the main support slot and 2cents opening.

In March 2011, Will Hunt left the band to record with Evanescence, and Danzig drummer Johnny Kelly (formerly of Type O Negative) filled in for him for the rest of the tour, however in May 2011, Mike Froedge of doubleDrive and Catanese's band Speed X joined the band.

Black Label Society released the compilation album The Song Remains Not the Same on May 3, 2011, via Entertainment One Music. The offering features unplugged versions of material from the album Order of the Black, as well as additional material recorded during the Order of the Black sessions. The Song Remains Not the Same was conceived, created and compiled by Zakk Wylde and the title is a nod to one of Wylde's favorite bands, Led Zeppelin.

On September 14, 2011, Wylde introduced Breaking Benjamin's Chad Szeliga as the band's new drummer.

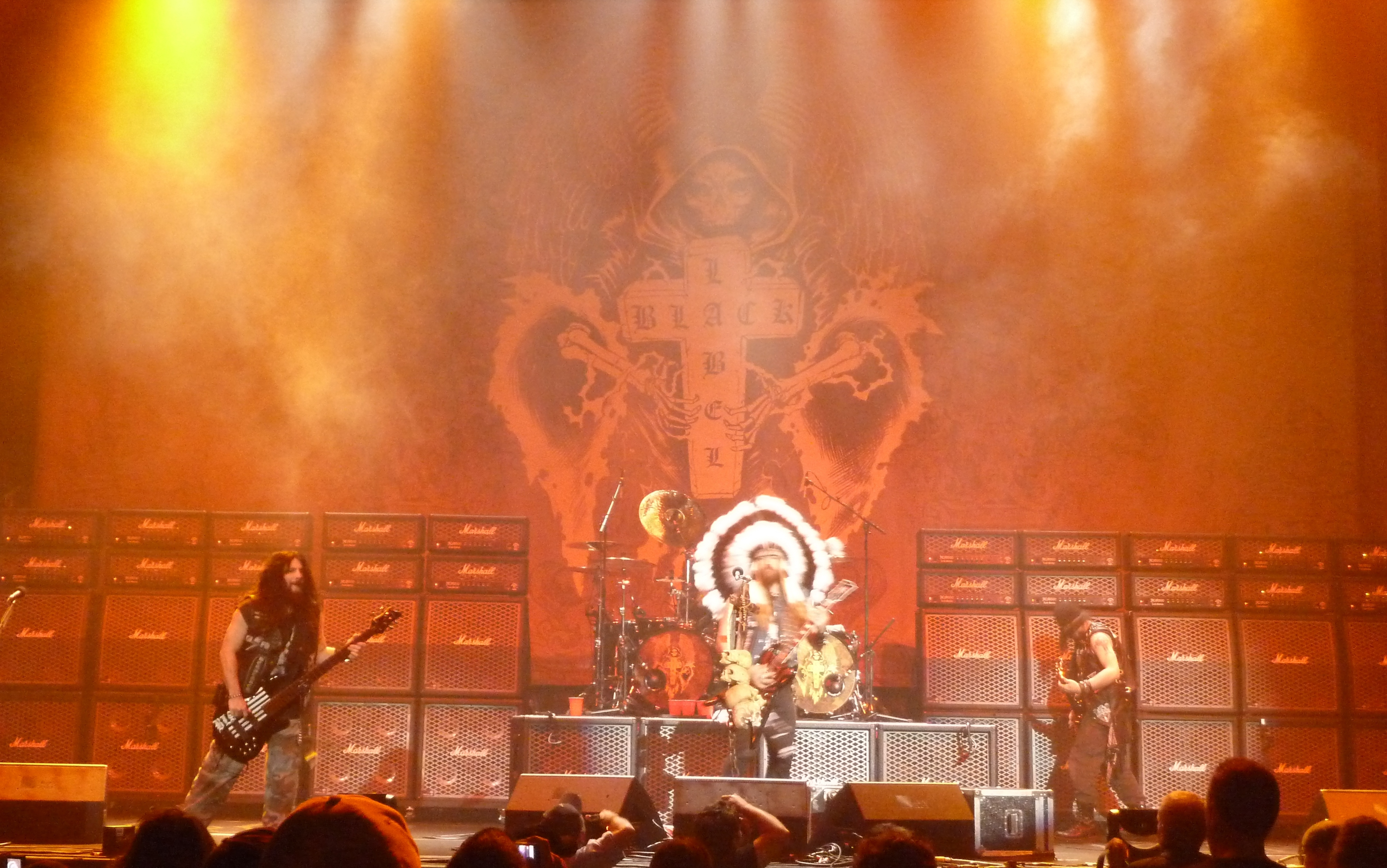
The band performing at Allen Event Center in Allen, Texas, in 2011

An interview with ESPN announced an acoustic DVD entitled Unblackened, in the works for 2012. The album was recorded during the Unblackened show at Club Nokia on March 6, 2013.

On May 3, 2013, it was announced that Black Label Society would be included in the year's installment of Gigantour, along with Megadeth, Device, Hellyeah, Newsted, and upstart band Death Division.

In August 2013, Zakk Wylde stated that he would begin writing a new studio album, and it would be scheduled for a 2014 release. On October 28, they debuted a new music video, a cover of Bill Withers "Ain't No Sunshine".

It was reported on December 2, 2013, that Nick Catanese had amicably parted from the band.

On January 1, 2014, Wylde announced via Facebook that Lizzy Borden guitarist Dario Lorina would be replacing Nick Catanese as rhythm guitarist. Lorina made his live debut with the band on April 16 in Seattle.

They released their ninth studio album, Catacombs of the Black Vatican on April 8th, 2014 debuting at number 5 on the Billboard 200 chart. It was the only album to feature Szeliga on drums.

On October 2, 2017, the band released the song "Room of Nightmares", also announcing that they will be releasing their new album Grimmest Hits on January 19, 2018. On November 20, the band released another song from Grimmest Hits titled "All That Once Shined".

On November 29, 2019, Black Label Society released a vinyl-only EP titled Nuns and Roaches. The release features six songs originally recorded in 1999.

On November 26, 2021 the band released their eleventh studio album, Doom Crew Inc., with the lead single "Set You Free" being selected by Loudwire as the 22nd-best metal song of 2021.

In February 2026, the band was announced as part of the lineup for the Louder Than Life music festival in Louisville, scheduled to take place in September.

On June 3, 2026 the band played their second show at Sweden Rock Festival in Norje, Sweden.

== Band members ==
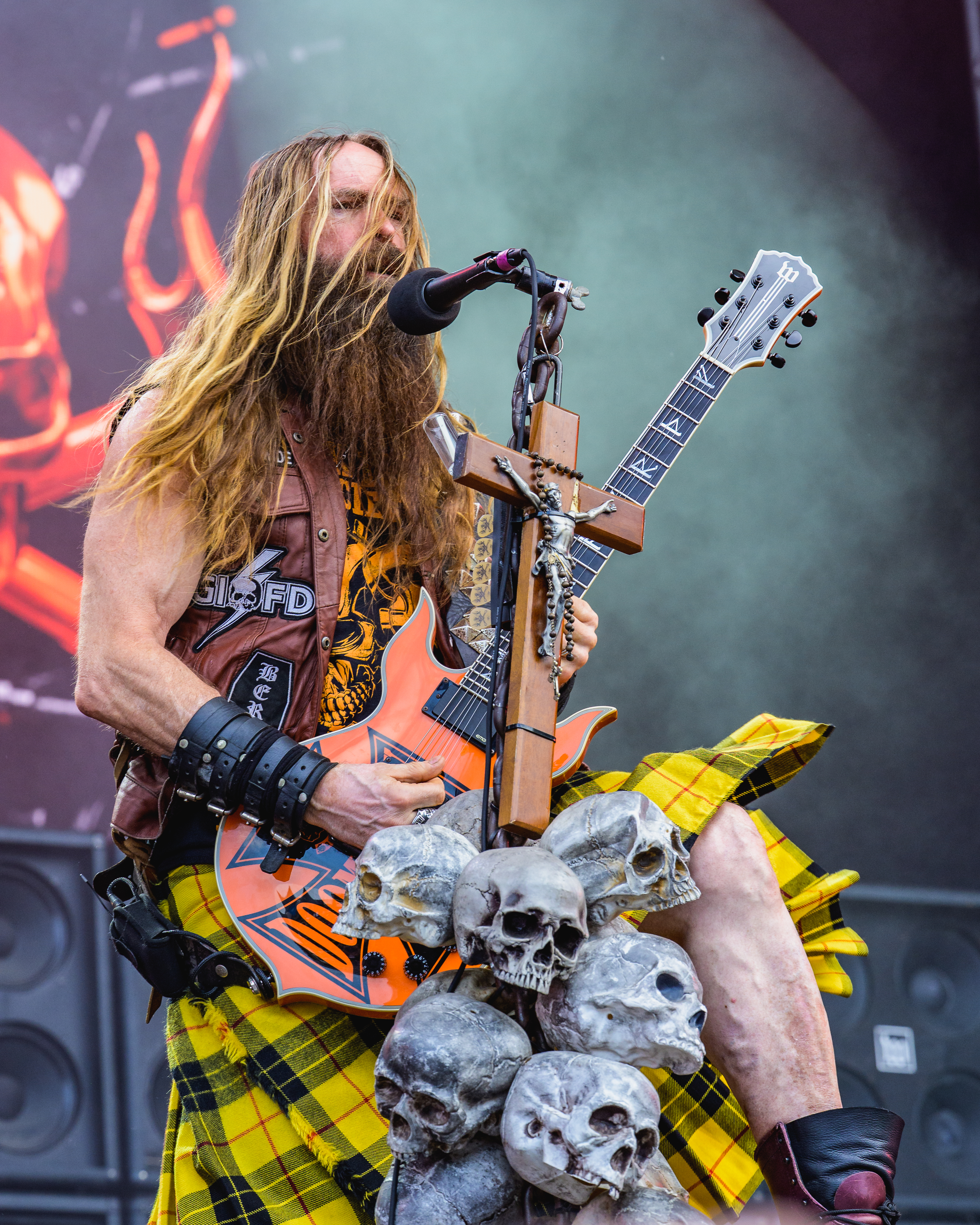
Zakk Wylde

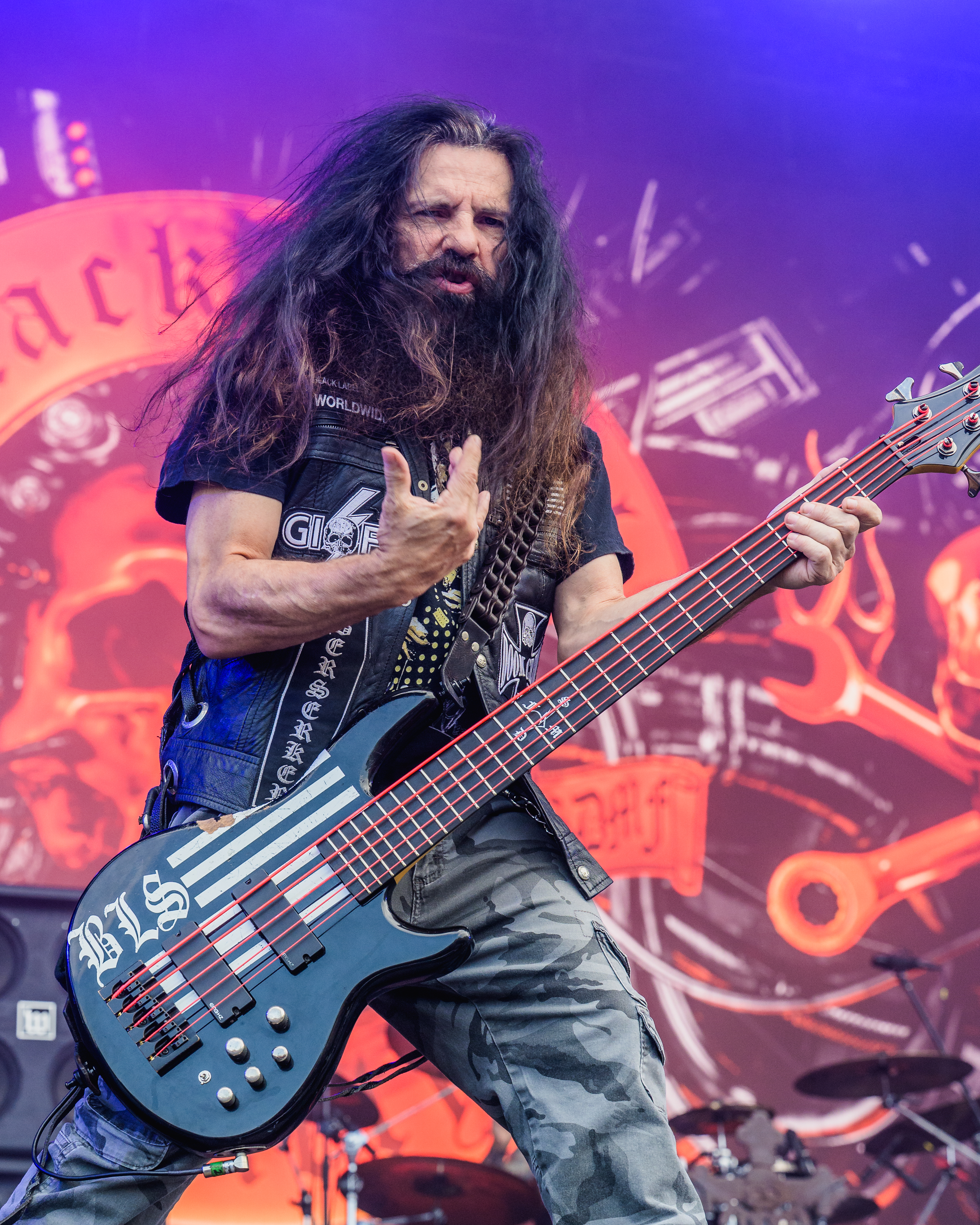
John DeServio

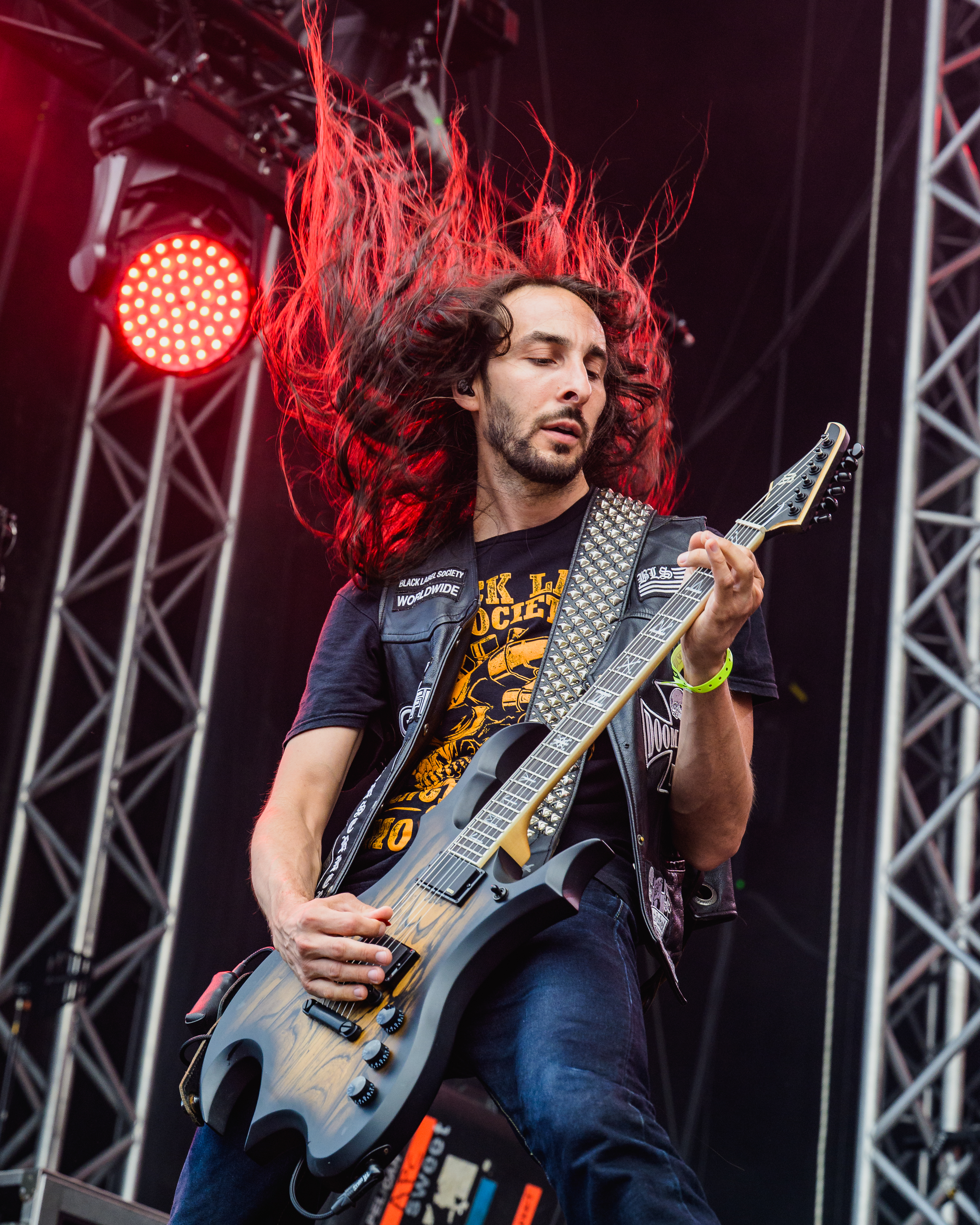
Dario Lorina

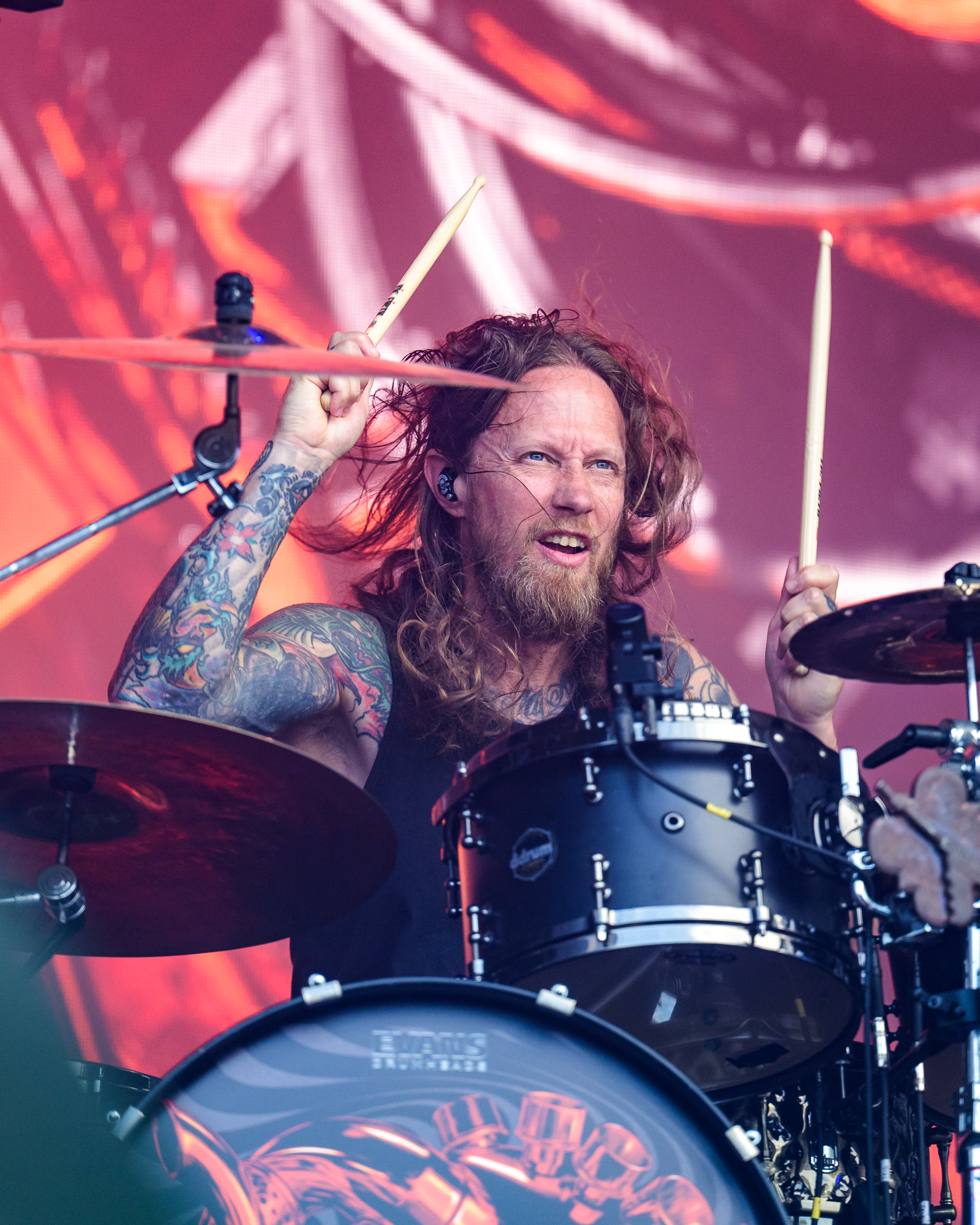
Jeff Fabb

Current members

- Zakk Wylde – lead guitar, lead vocals, piano (1998–present), bass (1998–2000)
- John DeServio – bass, backing vocals (1999, 2005–present)
- Dario Lorina – rhythm guitar, backing vocals (2014–present)
- Jeff Fabb – drums (2012–2013, 2014–present)

Live musicians

- Johnny Kelly – drums (2011)
- Mike Froedge – drums (2011)

Former members

- Phil Ondich – drums (1998–2000)
- Nick Catanese – rhythm guitar, backing vocals (1999–2013)
- Steve Gibb – bass (2000–2001)
- Craig Nunenmacher – drums (2000–2010)
- Mike Inez – bass (2001, 2003)
- Robert Trujillo – bass, backing vocals (2001–2003)
- James LoMenzo – bass, backing vocals (2004–2005)
- Will Hunt – drums (2010–2011)
- Chad Szeliga – drums (2011–2012, 2013–2014)

Timeline

== Discography ==
Studio albums

- Sonic Brew (1998)
- Stronger Than Death (2000)
- 1919 Eternal (2002)
- The Blessed Hellride (2003)
- Hangover Music Vol. VI (2004)
- Mafia (2005)
- Shot to Hell (2006)
- Order of the Black (2010)
- Catacombs of the Black Vatican (2014)
- Grimmest Hits (2018)
- Doom Crew Inc. (2021)
- Engines of Demolition (2026)

== Tours ==
- 2011: Black Label Berzerkus Tour started in February in Birmingham, England and ended Cologne, Germany in March, with Godsized. Dates in Asia at the end of March and beginning of April were canceled. A Latin America leg in May was also canceled, and rescheduled for August. A second leg through Europe started at the Sweden Rock Festival in June and ended at the Norway Rock Festival in July, also stopping at Graspop Metal Meeting and Hellfest.
- 2011: Uranium Tour through North America from May 4 to June 5, with All That Remains on all dates in May, and Rev Theory on the four dates in June. Hail the Villain had been scheduled to open, but canceled, and were replaced by Hourcast and Anchored. The tour included off-dates at the Rocklahoma, 93XFest, Kansas City Rockfest, and Rock on the Range festivals.
- 2011: Judas Priest's Epitaph World Tour of North America from October 12 to December 3. Black Label Society were one of the opening acts, alongside Thin Lizzy.
- 2014: Revolver Golden Gods Package Tour of North America with Butcher Babies and Devil You Know, from April 16 to June 7. Down joined the tour from May 5 in Birmingham, Alabama to May 23 in Grand Prairie, Texas.
- 2014: Catacombs of the Black Vatican European Tour, first leg, of major festivals and selected club dates from June 11 to July 10.
- 2014: Catacombs of the Black Vatican North American Tour, first leg, with Wovenwar and Kyng, from July 17 in Cincinnati, Ohio, to August 4 in Albuquerque, New Mexico.
- 2014: Catacombs of the Black Vatican Latin American Tour from August 8 to August 20.
- 2014–2015: Catacombs of the Black Vatican North American Tour, second leg, with Hatebreed and Butcher Babies, from December 28, 2014 in Spokane, Washington, to January 22, 2015 in Omaha, Nebraska.
- 2015: Catacombs of the Black Vatican European Tour, second leg, with Black Tusk and Crobot, from February 11 in Glasgow, Scotland, to March 15 in Lausanne, Switzerland.
- 2015: Unblackened tour of North America with Wino, from April 3 in Huntington, New York, to April 19 in Anaheim, California.
- 2015: Festival Tour around the world from May 27 at Ozzfiesta in Mexico, through most of Europe, to two shows, also in Mexico, opening for Ozzy Osbourne on August 18 and 20. Then a one-off appearance at the Food Truck and Rock Carnival in Clark, New Jersey on September 19, and a short run in November in Europe, and at Ozzfest Japan on November 22.
- 2015: Catacombs of the Black Vatican Australia/New Zealand tour from November 25 in Frenmantle, Australia, to December 4 in Auckland, New Zealand.
- 2015: Doom Trooping Into 2016 North American Tour with Huntress and The Shrine, from December 26 in Phoenix, Arizona, to December 31 in Marksville, Louisiana.
- 2018: The Grimmest Show on Earth North American Tour with Corrosion of Conformity, from January 2 in Omaha, Nebraska, to February 27 in Los Angeles, California. A short run of shows from January 8 in Montreal, Canada, to January 12 in Oklahoma City were canceled for health reasons, with Corrosion of Conformity playing some last-minute smaller headline shows in their place. A second leg from July 14 at the Cadott Rock Fest to August 11 in Sayreville, New Jersey included replacement dates for the four canceled shows. The date in Oklahoma City was postponed by two days, replacing the date in Sioux Falls, South Dakota, which was canceled due to poor ticket sales. Eyehategod joined several dates on both legs.
- 2018: The Grimmest Show on Earth European Tour with Monolord from March 3 in Ekaterinburg, Russia, to April 9 in Belfast, Northern Ireland. The Ekaterinburg date was eventually canceled and the tour started the next night in Moscow. The Belfast date on April 9 was added due to high demand after the original final date of the tour in Belfast on April 8 sold out.

2026: Engines Of Demolition Tour
