= Ron "Bumblefoot" Thal discography =

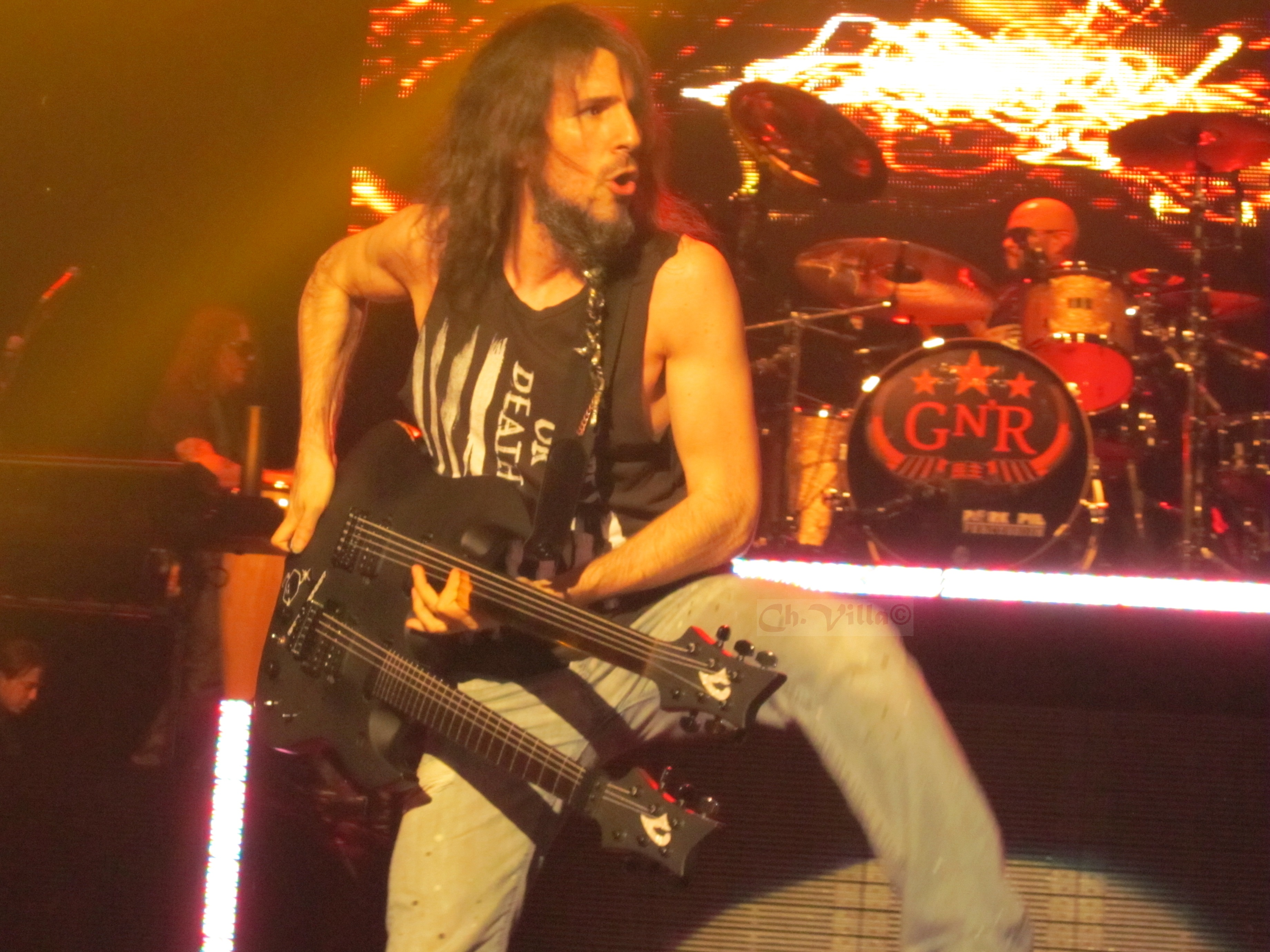
Thal in 2013 during his time with Guns N' Roses

This is the discography of American rock musician Ron "Bumblefoot" Thal.

== Albums ==
	Year	Album
As Ron Thal
As Ron Thal	1995	The Adventures of Bumblefoot
As Ron Thal	1997	Hermit
As Bumblefoot
As Bumblefoot	1998	Hands
As Bumblefoot	2001	9.11
As Bumblefoot	2002	Uncool
As Bumblefoot	2005	Normal
As Bumblefoot	2008	Abnormal
As Bumblefoot	2015	Little Brother Is Watching
With Guns N' Roses
With Guns N' Roses	2008	Chinese Democracy
With Tony Harnell & The Wildflowers
With Tony Harnell & The Wildflowers	2013	Tony Harnell & The Wildflowers featuring Bumblefoot
With Art of Anarchy
With Art of Anarchy	2015	Art of Anarchy
With Art of Anarchy	2017	The Madness
With Sons of Apollo
With Sons of Apollo	2017	Psychotic Symphony
With Sons of Apollo	2020	MMXX
With Whom Gods Destroy
With Whom Gods Destroy	2024	Insanium

== Compilations and extended plays ==
	Year	Album
2003	Forgotten Anthology	
2008	Barefoot – The Acoustic EP	
2020	Barefoot 2 – acoustic EP	
2020	Barefoot 3 – acoustic EP	

== Singles ==
Year	single
2011	"Bernadette" (First song in a series of digitally released singles – January 2011)
2011	"Strawberry Fields Forever" (Second song in a series of digitally released singles – February 2011)
2011	"Invisible" (Third song in a series of digitally released singles – March 2011)
2011	"Goodbye Yellow Brick Road" (Fourth song in a series of digitally released singles – April 2011)
2011	"Father" (Fifth song in a series of digitally released singles – May 2011)
2011	"Cat Fight" (Sixth song in a series of digitally released singles June 2011)
2011	"There's A Kind of Hush" (Seventh song in a series of digitally released singles – July 2011)
2011	"Let Your Voice Be Heard" (Eighth song in a series of digitally released singles – September 2011)
2011	"The Pink Panther Theme" (Ninth song in a series of digitally released singles – December 2011)
2019	"Cintaku"
2020	"Planetary Lockdown"

== Video releases ==
2004: Live at the RMA

== Live albums ==
2014: Appetite for Democracy 3D (with Guns N' Roses)

2019: Live With the Plovdiv Psychotic Symphony (with Sons of Apollo)

== Guest appearances ==
Year	Artist	Album	Credits
2001	Jessica Simpson (Hex Hector club mix)	"Irresistible" – CD single	Guitarist and co-engineer
2003	Q*Ball	Q*Ball in Space	Guitar and backing vocals
2004	Various Artists	Shawn Lane Remembered Vol 2	Guest fretless guitar solo on Richard Daude's song "From the Inside"
2004	Mistheria	Messenger of the Gods	Guest guitar solo in the song "Dynasty of Death"
2005	Phi Yann-Zek	Solar Flare	Guest guitar solo in the song "Psychometamorph" – (Thal on synth guitar – right channel)
2005	Q*Ball	Fortune Favors the Bald	Guitar and backing vocals
2005	Freak Kitchen	Organic	Guest vocals and fretless guitar on the song "Speak When Spoken To"
2005	Christophe Godin	Metal Kartoon	Guest fretless guitar solo on the song "Metal Kartoon"
2005	Julien Damotte & Fufux	Papa NoHell (unreleased)	Guest guitar solo on Christmas song 'Papa NoHell' by Julien Damotte & Fufux
2006	Mike Orlando	Sonic Stomp	Guest fretless guitar solos on the song "Game Over"
2006	Thomas Bressel	Influences of Time	Guest guitar solo on the song "My Sticky Shoes Against The Ugly Bumblebee"
2006	24-7 Spyz	Face the Day	Guest guitarist
2006	Guthrie Govan	Erotic Cakes	Guest fretless guitar solos on the song "Rhode Island Shred"
2007	Various Artists	The Alchemists II	Guest fretless guitar solo on Terry Syrek's song "Threehundredpointtwentyone"
2007	Q*Ball	This Is Serious Business	Guitar and backing vocals
2007	Jordan Rudess	The Road Home	Guitar solo on "Tarkus" (@19m10s) & fretless guitar solo on "Just the Same" (@3m22s)
2008	Various Artists	We Wish You A Metal Christmas	Lead guitar on the song "Frosty the Snowman", also featuring Chris Chaney, Kenny Aronoff and Anvil's Steve "Lips" Kudlow
2009	Orelsan	Perdu D'avance	Guest guitar solo on the song "La Peur De Lechec"
2009	Swashbuckle	Back to the Noose	Guest guitar solos on the songs "Cruise Ship Terror" and "Rounds of Rum"
2009	Various Artists	OCC Rocks	Performed with Orange County Choppers Band – guest guitar solo on the song "Cold Sweat"
2010	Liberty N' Justice	Light It Up	Guest guitar solos on the song "Wrestling With God"
2010	Ty Tabor	Something's Coming	Guest guitar solo on the song "Free Yourself"
2010	Indestructible Noise Command	Bleed the Line	Guest guitar solo on the song "Rain"
2011	Scarlet Haze	Reach Down	Laid music tracks for the song "Reach Down"
2011	Fredrik Pihl	Silhouettes	Guest guitar solo on title track "Silhouettes"
2011	Rick Devin	Tush (Single)	Guest guitar solo on the track "Tush"
2011	Various Artists	Embrace the Sun (Japan Tsunami Relief CD)	Guest guitar solo on Milan Polak's song "End of Time"
2011	Plug-In	Hijack	Guest guitar solo on the song "Ron to the Hill"
2011	Don Jamieson	Live and Hilarious	Introduction
2011	Various Artists	Guitar Addiction, Vol. 1	Guitar solo on "Cacophusion"
2011	ElixirOnMute	The Last Halloween	Guitar solo on the "Hourglass"
2012	Scarface	Work Ethic	Guitar on "Intro", "Hard In the Ghetto", & "Cold Blooded" (acoustic & rock mixes). Also engineered final mixes & mastering.
2012	Madonagun	Grovel At Her Feet	Guitar Solo on "Bloodlust"
2012	Liberty N Justice	The Cigar Chronicles	Guitar Solo on "Stuck In the Middle"
2012	Rick Stitch	LIV4EVR single	Guitar Solo on "LIV4EVR"
2013	Cilver	In My Head	Guitar solo on "In My Head"
2013	The Feckers	It'd Be Rude Not To	Guitar solo on "Minus"
2013	Russ Dwarf	Wireless	Guitar solo on "Driftin' Back"
2013	Mattias Eklundh	Freak Guitar - The Smorgasbord	Guitar solo on "Special Agent Bauer"
2014	Destrage	Are You Kidding Me? No.	Guitar solo on "Are You Kidding Me? No."
2015	DMC Generation Kill	Lot Lizard (feat. Bumblefoot) - Single	Guest guitar & production on "Lot Lizard"
2015	Carthagods	Carthagods	Guitar solo on "My Revenge"
2015	Bumblefoot & Milan Polak	Devil On My Shoulder	Single - written by Bumblefoot & Milan Polak, featuring drummer Thomas Lang and Megadeth bassist David Ellefson.
2016	Fragile Mortals (ft. DMC and Generation Kill	Fired Up	Single - guitar solo / Producer
2016	Fragile Mortals (ft. DMC and Generation Kill	Suicide	Single - guitar solo / Producer
2016	Thank You Scientist	Stranger Heads Prevail	Backing vocals in "Prologue: A Faint Applause"
2016	Paul Personne	Lost In Paris Blues Band	Album featuring Paul Personne, Ron 'Bumblefoot' Thal, Robben Ford and John Jorgenson on guitar & vocals
2017	Dobermann	Pure Breed	Guitar solo on "Radioactive"
2022	Star One	Revel in Time	guitar solo on "Back from the Past"
2022	Derek Sherinian	Vortex	guitar on "Aurora Australis"
2024	Cactus	Temple Of Blues	guitar on "Guiltless Glider"

== Compilation albums ==
Year	Artist	Album	Credits
1992	Various Artists	Ominous Guitarists From the Unknown	Includes "Chopin Fantasie." Co-produced "Story Teller" by Rich Kern
1992	Various Artists	Guitar on the Edge No. 2	Includes "The Shuck Duffle" (renamed "Blue Tongue" on The Adventures of Bumblefoot)
1993	Various Artists	Guitar on the Edge No. 3	Includes "Love Soup"
1994	Various Artists	Guitar on the Edge No. 4	Includes "Bumblefoot" from The Adventures of Bumblefoot
1996	Various Artists	SEGA Power Cuts 1	Includes songs from the Sega CD video game Wild Woody soundtrack
1996	Various Artists	Super Guitar Heroes Vol. 1, 2, & 3	Includes "Chopin Fantasie" (OGFTU), "Blue Tongue" & "Rinderpest" (The Adventures of Bumblefoot)
1997	Various Artists	Ondes De Choc	Includes "Hermit" and "Freak" from Hermit
1997	Various Artists	Hard Beats From Hell	Includes the title track from Hermit
1998	Various Artists	Guitar & Bass No. 50	Includes "Chair Ass" from Hands
2000	Various Artists	Rock Sound, Volume 45	Includes "T-Jonez" from Uncool
2001	Various Artists	Fretless Guitar Masters	Includes "Lost" and "RayGun" from 9.11
2002	Various Artists	The Alchemists	Includes "Mafalda" from Forgotten Anthology
2003	Soundtrack	Outlaw Volleyball: Music From The Game	Includes "Meat" from Forgotten Anthology
2005	Various Artists	Village of the Unfretted	Includes "Mafalda" from Forgotten Anthology
2006	Various Artists	Artists for Charity – Guitarists 4 the Kids	Includes "Breaking" from Normal
2006	Various Artists	CMJ – On Air, Vol. 12	Includes "Rockstar for a Day" from Normal
2008	Various Artists	FMQB – SubModern #021 Specialty Show Sampler	Includes title track from Abnormal. Also mixed and co-produced
2009	Various Artists	Guitars That Ate My Brain	Includes the song "Disengaged." Also mixed, co-produced and mastered
2009	Various Artists	This Is Shredding, Vol. 1	Includes "Blue Tongue" from The Adventures of Bumblefoot. Also mixed and co-produced
2014	Various Artists	Rock 2 Live, Vol. 1	Includes "Let Your Voice Be Heard" and "Normal".

== Tribute CDs ==
Year	Artist	Album	Credits
2000	Various Artists	Crushing Days – A Tribute To Joe Satriani	Tribute to Joe Satriani CD. Covered "Always With You, Always With Me"
2001	Various Artists	Warmth in the Wilderness – A Tribute to Jason Becker	Performed a duet solo with guitarist Mike Chlasciak for the song "Out Jam"
2002	Lounge Brigade	Sabbath in the Suburbs: The Lounge Tribute to Ozzy Osbourne & Black Sabbath	Thal, as balladeer crooner "Herbert 'Ruffles' Lovecraft", sings Iron Man, Paranoid and Bark at the Moon
2002	Lounge Brigade	The Sweet Sounds of Slim Shady: The Lounge Tribute to Eminem	Thal, once again, as crooner "Herbert 'Ruffles' Lovecraft" and also as "Checkers Goldstein". Songs include "Without Me", "Cleaning Out My Closet" "My Name Is" and "Soldier"
2003	Lounge Brigade	The Lounge Below: The Lounge Tribute to Outkast	A lounge-style tribute to Outkast. Produced by Thal and featuring "Herbert 'Ruffles' Lovecraft" on vocals
2004	Various Artists	The Spirit Lives On – The Music of Jimi Hendrix Revisited, Volume 1	Covered "Fire". (With Dennis Leeflang on drums)
2013	Various Artists	A World With Heroes - A KISS Tribute	Vocals and Guitars on "Detroit Rock City"
2013	Various Artists	Thriller - A Metal Tribute To Michael Jackson	Guitar on "Beat It"

== Other projects ==
Year	Artist	Album	Credits
1987	AWOL	AWOL – EP	Thal's six-song EP of his band Awol
1995	Soundtrack	Wild Woody SEGA CD video game	Composed and performed entire soundtrack
2002	Carlin Music Publishing	Library CD #331 Alternative: Punk vs. Nu-Metal	Songs written by Thal exclusively for Carlin Publishing
2003	Soundtrack	Outlaw Volleyball Xbox video game	Music includes "Meat" from Thal's Forgotten Anthology CD
2004	Soundtrack	Test Drive: Eve of Destruction PlayStation 2 video game	Music includes Thal's "American Rock-n-Roll" from Carlin Music Publishing's Alternative: Punk vs. Nu-Metal CD
2005	Carlin Music Publishing	Library CD #356 Rap & Hip Hop	Songs written by Thal exclusively for Carlin Publishing
2010	Soundtrack	Rig 'N' Roll PC video game	Music includes Thal's "American Rock-n-Roll" from Carlin Music Publishing's Alternative: Punk vs. Nu-Metal CD
2016	Soundtrack	"The Evangelist" movie (previously titled "Clean Cut")	Composed and performed entire soundtrack

== Producer ==
Year	Artist	Album	Credits
1996	Boiler Room	Low Society	Engineered / Produced. Self-released debut CD of NYC nu-metal band
1996	Various Artists	God Shave the Queen	Engineered / Produced, co-wrote, Performed bass, guitar, keys
1996	Indecision	Unorthodox	Engineered / Co-produced
1997	Inhuman	Evolver	Engineered / Co-produced. NYC band's first full-length CD
1998	Indecision	Most Precious Blood	Engineered / Co-produced
1998	Evoken	Embrace the Emptiness	Engineered / Co-produced
1998	Various Artists	Lost Voices	Engineered / Produced. Tribute album to Jimi Hendrix, Jim Morrison and Janis Joplin. Produced the group Tyris performing the Doors' song "Love Her Madly"
1999	Future Chicken Farmers	Future Chicken Farmers	Engineered / Co-produced
1999	Pat O'May	Breizh / Amerika	Co-engineered / Produced
1999	Inhuman	Rebellion	Engineered / Co-produced
2000	Various Artists	Hell Rules 2 – A Tribute To Black Sabbath	Engineered / Co-produced
2000	Anomos/Stealth	From Here On...	Engineered / Co-produced, mixed and mastered. Performed guitar, choir arrangements
2000	Various Artists	Crushing Days – A Tribute To Joe Satriani	Engineered / Produced
2000	Evoken	Quietus	Engineered / Co-produced
2002	The Wage of Sin	Product of Deceit And Loneliness	Engineered / Co-produced
2001	Most Precious Blood	Nothing in Vein	Engineered / Produced
2001	One Second Thought	Self Inflicted	Engineered / Co-produced
2002	Troy Kurtis (former of Menudo)	Demo	Engineered / Produced. Co-writing, performed all music
2002	Q*Ball	In Space	Engineered / Co-produced / Performed guitar, backing vocals
2003	Cathy-Ann	Honey Wagon	Engineered / Produced, Performed all music except acoustic guitar/vocals
2004	Q*Ball	Fortune Favors the Bald	Engineered / Produced, some Co-writing, Performed guitars, backing vocals
2004	Various Artists	Bring You To Your Knees: A Tribute To Guns N' Roses	Engineered, Produced
2004	The Nerve!	The Nerve!	Engineered / Produced
2004	Nikki Sorrentino	Demo	Engineered, Produced. Wrote and performed music
2005	Evoken	Antithesis of Light	Engineered / Produced
2005	Zachary Fischer Band	On Borrowed Time	Engineered / Produced
2006	24-7 Spyz	Face the Day	Engineered, co-produced, guest guitar solos
2007	Q*Ball	This Is Serious Business	Engineered, produced, some co-writing, performed guitars, backing vocals
2007	Hurricane	Abaybay (Rock Re-mix)	Engineered, produced, performed
2007	Return To Earth	Captains of Industry	Co-engineered, co-produced, performed some backing vocals
2007	Talking Metal on Fuse	FuseTV (November 2007 – March 2008)	Engineered, produced, performed
2010	Return To Earth	Automata	Mixed, co-produced
2012	Alexa Vetere	Breathe Again	Co-writer, rhythm and lead guitars, backing vocals, engineered/produced, mixed & mastered
2012	Poc	Rise Above	Co-writer, all music & backing vocals, engineered/produced, mixed & mastered
2015	Art of Anarchy	Art of Anarchy	Co-writer, guitarist, backing vocalist, engineered/produced, mixed & mastered
2016	Art of Anarchy	The Madness (single)	Co-writer, guitarist, backing vocalist, engineered/produced, mixed & mastered
2017	Art of Anarchy	The Madness	Co-writer, guitarist, backing vocalist, engineered/produced, mixed & mastered
