= The Saturnine =

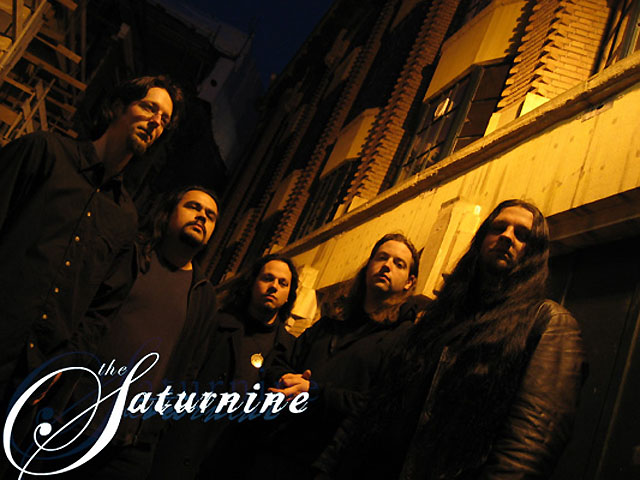

Background information
- Origin: Netherlands
- Genres: Melodic melancholic rock
- Years active: 2003–present

The Saturnine is a melodic melancholic rock band, originally formed in the Netherlands, but currently featuring musicians from the Netherlands, Germany and New York City.

== History ==
The Saturnine was formed in 2003 by drummer Dennis Leeflang (Bumblefoot, Sun Caged, Within Temptation), guitarist/songwriter Eric Hazebroek (Daeonia, Trisomy, Manifest, Stream of Passion) and bassist Douwe de Wilde (Daeonia). Leeflang brought in guitarist Edo van der Kolk (Kingfisher Sky) and vocalist Sander van den Thillart (Wowbeggar, Footfalls). Leeflang and Van den Thillart had a long history of collaborating in various cover/tribute bands since 1993.

The Saturnine - line-up 2006 / 2007

The Saturnine recorded an EP, entitled "Within Without", in 2004, which received positive reviews in the music press. The band performed around the mid-west of The Netherlands throughout 2004.

Despite the adjoining success, Leeflang left the band in late 2004, after relocating to New York City. Ironically, drummer Ivar de Graaf once again replaced Leeflang (he had replaced Leeflang in Within Temptation in 1996), though this time as per Leeflang's own request. Additionally, Ciro Palma replaced De Graaf not much later, as had also happened in Within Temptation previously. Several more band member changes withheld the band from regular shows and recording a full-length album, although The Saturnine did perform some significant shows together with Swedish rock band Katatonia.

When original drummer Leeflang heard of Hazebroek's plans to disband the group in 2006, he rejoined the group as a recording member, bringing with him vocalist Matty Pritchard (The Din) from New York. Danny Tunker (guitarist with Fuelblooded and Detonation) completed the line-up after Edo van der Kolk left to rejoin Ivar de Graaf in his new band Kingfisher Sky. The Saturnine recorded a new EP, entitled "The Winter Years", in late 2006, which was released in June 2007. In 2008 Van den Thillart rejoined The Saturnine, bringing the band back to almost the original line-up.

As The Saturnine were considering plans for touring and recording in 2009 and 2010, Leeflang joined Lita Ford on her 2009 tour, while Hazebroek joined Stream Of Passion and Tunker joined God Dethroned. This effectively forced The Saturnine to postpone serious touring. Recording sessions continued on both sides of the Atlantic, however, and their debut full-length album The I in Every Storm was released in 2014.

== Band members ==
Current line-up

- Sander van den Thillart - vocals
- Eric Hazebroek - guitars
- Danny Tunker - guitars
- Douwe de Wilde - bass
- Dennis Leeflang - drums

Former members

- Matty Pritchard - vocals (2006–2007)
- Edo van der Kolk - guitars (2003–2006)
- Ciro Palma - drums (2006)
- Ivar de Graaf - drums (2005)
- Eelco van der Meer - drums (2005–2006)
- Michael van der Kolk - drums (2005)
- Claudia de Graaf - vocals (2006)
- Eddy Borremans - vocals (2005)
- Sander van den Thillart - vocals (2003–2005)
