= Lafrae Olivia Sci =

American jazz musician

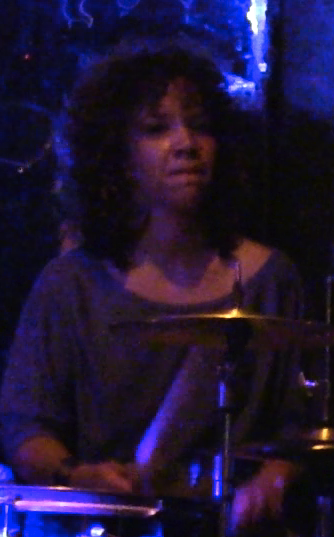
Sci playing with Melvin Van Peebles at Zebulon Cafe Concert

LaFrae Olivia Sci is a rock, jazz, and session drummer. She is also a composer, arranger, and bandleader who was musical director for Sandra Bernhard's Broadway musical Everything Bad and Beautiful. She participated in the jazz ambassadors program.

LaFrae is a founding member of the Willie Mae Rock Camp for Girls. She leads a music education program sponsored by Jazz at Lincoln Center designed to expand the jazz knowledge of middle school musicians in New York City.

She has performed with Burnt Sugar, Hot Caramel with Irene Cara, and she formed The 13th Amendment with members of Melvin Van Peebles wid Laxative. LaFrae played with Bumblefoot from 2000-2003 and recorded with them on two albums, Uncool and 9.11. She recorded with Reuben Wilson, Andrew Beals, and Doug Monroe on "Boogaloo to The Beastie Boys – A Tribute."

In 2026 LaFrae was co-musical director and drummer for Stevie: A Life in the Key of Songs, BAM Howard Gilman Opera House, during which five Stevie Wonder albums were performed in three days.

LaFrae has received press from Modern Drummer and TomTom magazine.
