= Maps of Non-Existent Places =

Studio album by Thank You Scientist
- Released: June 8, 2012
- Genre: Progressive rock; progressive metal; jazz fusion
- Length: 58:43
- Label: Evil Ink/Universal Music

Thank You Scientist chronology
| Maps of Non-Existent Places (2012) | Stranger Heads Prevail (2016) |

Maps of Non-Existent Places is the debut full-length album by progressive rock band Thank You Scientist. This is the only album to feature Greg Colacino on bass and Russ Lynch on violin, viola and mandolin.

== Track listing ==
Maps of Non-Existent Places track listing
| No. | Title | Length |
|---|---|---|
| 1. | "Prelude" | 1:14 |
| 2. | "A Salesman's Guide to Non-Existence" | 5:06 |
| 3. | "Feed the Horses" | 6:28 |
| 4. | "Blood on the Radio" | 9:24 |
| 5. | "Absentee" | 6:02 |
| 6. | "Suspicious Waveforms" | 6:34 |
| 7. | "Carnival" | 6:33 |
| 8. | "Concrete Swan Dive" | 5:51 |
| 9. | "In the Company of Worms" | 5:47 |
| 10. | "My Famed Disappearing Act" | 5:44 |

== Personnel ==
Credits adapted from the CD booklet.

Thank You Scientist

- Salvatore Marrano – vocals
- Tom Monda – guitar, fretless guitar, acoustic guitars, cello, shamisen, vocals
- Russ Lynch – violin, viola, mandolin, vocals
- Andrew Digrius – trumpet, flugelhorn, trombone, vocals
- Ellis Jasenovic – tenor and soprano saxophone
- Greg Colacino – bass
- Odin Alvarez – drums, percussion

Additional musicians

- David Bodie – percussion
- Mark Radice – vocals

Production

- Jesse Cannon – recording, engineering, mixing
- Mike Oettinger – recording, engineering
- Ron "Bumblefoot" Thal – extra ears
- Alan Douches – mastering
- Jeff Fariello – additional tracking on "Prelude"

== Charts ==
Peak chart positions
| US Alt | US Heat | US Hard Rock | US Rock |
|---|---|---|---|
| 25 | 4 | 14 | 48 |
