= Artemisia (album) =

Studio album by Sun Caged
- Released: March 23, 2007 (Japan) May 21, 2007
- Recorded: April – December 2006 Pit studio
- Genre: Progressive metal
- Length: 69:57
- Label: Lion Music
- Producers: Hans Reinders, Paul, Marcel and Rene

Sun Caged chronology
Promo 2005 (2005)	Artemisia (2007)	The Lotus Effect (2011)

Artemesia is the second studio album by the Dutch progressive metal band Sun Caged, released on March 23, 2007, by Lion Music. The album features the band's current lineup, which has steadied after many replacements during the years of their productions. The Japanese version of the album features a cover song; "Land of Confusion" by progressive rock band Genesis.

== Track listing ==
1. "Lyre's Harmony" − 7:22
2. "A Fair Trade" − 6:26
3. "Unborn" − 6:27
4. "Blood Lines" − 9:30
5. "Painted Eyes" − 4:26
6. "Engelbert the Inchworm" − 4:36
7. "Afraid to Fly" − 7:09
8. "Dialogue" − 8:24
9. "Departing Words" − 8:05
10. "Doldrums" − 7:32
11. "Land of Confusion" (Genesis cover) − (Bonus track for Japan)

== Credits ==
=== Band members ===
- Paul Adrian Villarreal − vocals, acoustic guitar
- Marcel Coenen − lead guitar, rhythm guitar
- Rene Kroon − keyboards
- Roel Vink − bass
- Roel van Helden − drums and percussion

=== Guest musicians ===
- Barend Tromp − (Fretless) bass on "A Fair Trade" and "Afraid to Fly", additional fretless bass parts on "Doldrums", Sitar on "Departing Words".

=== Other ===
Production

- Keyboards were recorded at Rene's home studio.
- Mixed by Marcel, Hans and Rene.
- Mastered by Marcel and Hans.
- All music written by Sun Caged, except "Engelbert", written by Sun Caged and Rob Van Der Loo.
- All lyrics by Paul Adrian Villarreal.
- Artwork by Jeroen Evers on www.porcupine.nl.
- Photographs by Wim Van Het Hof.

Miscellaneous

- Nick Hameury − voice of Engelbert
- Lee Loveless − voice on "Blood Lines"
- Amanda Loveless − voice on "Departing Words"
