= Art of Anarchy (album) =

Studio album by Art of Anarchy
- Released: June 2, 2015
- Genre: Hard rock, alternative metal
- Length: 45:20/54:31 (with bonus tracks)
- Label: Another Century
- Producer: Ron "Bumblefoot" Thal

Art of Anarchy chronology
Art of Anarchy (2015)	The Madness (2017)

Singles from Art of Anarchy
- 1. "Til the Dust Is Gone" Released: April 17, 2015; 2. "Time Every Time" Released: July 31, 2015

Professional ratings
Review scores
Source	Rating
AllMusic	3.5/5 stars

Art of Anarchy is the first studio album by American rock band Art of Anarchy, released on June 2, 2015. It is the band's only album to feature vocalist Scott Weiland, who distanced himself from the project soon after its release. This was also Weiland's final album before his death on December 3, 2015.

== Album information ==
On March 19, 2015 it was announced that the new album to be released on June 2, 2015 would be self-titled, and the first single will be "Til The Dust Is Gone". On January 21, 2015, they released a 2:06 teaser of the new album. Bumblefoot is the producer and engineer on the album.

On December 22, 2015, "In memory of Scott Weiland", Art of Anarchy made their album available free online for their fans.

== Track listing ==
No.	Title	Writer(s)	Length
1.	"Black Rain"	Jon Votta, Ron "Bumblefoot" Thal	0:45
2.	"Small Batch Whiskey"	Votta, Scott Weiland	4:45
3.	"Time Every Time"	Votta, Weiland	4:19
4.	"Get On Down"	Votta, Weiland	4:04
5.	"Grand Applause"	Votta, Weiland, Vince Votta	4:45
6.	"Til the Dust Is Gone"	Votta, Weiland	5:14
7.	"Death of It"	Votta, Weiland, Thal	4:12
8.	"Superstar"	Votta, Weiland	4:11
9.	"Aqualung"	Votta, Weiland, Thal	4:05
10.	"Long Ago"	Votta, Weiland	3:52
11.	"The Drift"	Votta, Weiland	5:08
Total length:			45:20

Japanese edition bonus tracks
No.	Title	Length
12.	"Til the Dust Is Gone" (acoustic)	5:13
13.	"Long Ago" (acoustic)	3:58
Total length:		54:31

== Personnel ==
Art of Anarchy

- Ron "Bumblefoot" Thal – lead and rhythm guitar, backing vocals, production, engineer, mixing, mastering
- Jon Votta – lead and rhythm guitar, backing vocals, executive producer
- Scott Weiland – lead vocals
- John Moyer – bass guitar, backing vocals
- Vince Votta – drums, percussion, executive producer

Additional personnel

- Doug Grean – vocal producer for Scott Weiland
- Marc Sasso – artwork, design, layout
- Catherine Asanov – photography
- Keith Hejna – harmonica on "Small Batch Whiskey"
- Walter Votta – percussion on "Small Batch Whiskey"
