= Terraformer (Thank You Scientist album) =

Studio album by Thank You Scientist
- Released: June 14, 2019
- Genres: Progressive rock; progressive metal; jazz fusion
- Length: 82:15
- Label: Evil Ink
- Producer: Tom Monda

Thank You Scientist chronology
Stranger Heads Prevail (2016)	Terraformer (2019)	Plague Accommodations (2021)

Terraformer ratings
Review scores
Source	Rating
Distorted Sound	10/10
Jazzwise	4/5 stars
Metal Injection	9/10
Sonic Perspectives	9.3/10

Terraformer is the third studio album by progressive rock band Thank You Scientist. It was released on June 14, 2019, by Evil Ink Records.

== Track listing ==
No.	Title	Length
1.	"Wrinkle"	2:32
2.	"FXMLDR"	7:56
3.	"Swarm"	6:25
4.	"Son of a Serpent"	8:06
5.	"Birdwatching"	3:41
6.	"Everyday Ghosts"	10:03
7.	"Chromology"	9:49
8.	"Geronimo"	6:15
9.	"Life of Vermin"	8:11
10.	"Shatner's Lament"	1:13
11.	"Anchor"	9:56
12.	"New Moon"	2:01
13.	"Terraformer"	8:07
Total length:		82:15

== Personnel ==
Thank You Scientist

- Salvatore Marrano – vocals
- Tom Monda – guitars, production
- Ben Karas – violin
- Joe Gullace – trumpet
- Sam Greenfield – saxophone
- Cody McCorry – bass
- Faye Fadem – drums
