= The King Is Fat'n'Old =

Studio album by Destrage
- Released: October 4, 2010
- Recorded: Metal House Studio, Turin, Italy, 2009
- Genre: Progressive metalcore
- Length: 49:37
- Label: Coroner Records (CR011), Howling Bull
- Producer: Destrage and Ettore Rigotti

Destrage chronology
Urban Being (2007)	The King Is Fat'n'Old (2010)	Are You Kidding Me? No. (2014)

The King Is Fat'n'Old is the second studio album by the Italian progressive metalcore band Destrage, released on October 4, 2010, by Coroner Records worldwide and by Howling Bull in Japan.

== Track listing ==
No.	Title	Length
1.	"Double Yeah"	3:21
2.	"Twice the Price"	4:07
3.	"Jade's Place"	3:57
4.	"Neverending Mary"	3:47
5.	"Back Door Epoque"	5:34
6.	"Smell You Later Fishy Bitch"	4:17
7.	"Collateral Pleasure"	4:47
8.	"Home Made Chili Delicious Italian Beef"	4:19
9.	"Tip of the Day"	4:36
10.	"Panda vs Koala"	3:55
11.	"Wayout"	5:40
12.	"Back Door Reprise"	1:17

== Personnel ==
Destrage

- Paolo Colavolpe – vocals
- Matteo Di Gioia – guitar
- Ralph Salati – guitar
- Gabriel Pignata – bass
- Federico Paulovich – drums

Additional performer

- Mattias Eklundh – guitar (track 3)
