= The Lotus Effect =

Studio album by Sun Caged
- Released: 17 June 2011
- Recorded: Late 2008 – 2010
- Genre: Progressive metal
- Length: 72:00
- Label: Lion Music
- Producer: Sun Caged

Sun Caged chronology
Artemisia (2007)	The Lotus Effect (2011)

The Lotus Effect is the third studio album by the Dutch progressive metal band Sun Caged, released on 17 June 2011 by Lion Music. The album features the same lineup as their previous album Artemisia except for the loss of bassist Roel Vink, who was replaced by Daniel Kohn. Writing and arranging music for the album began almost immediately after release of Artemisia in 2007, with instrumental recording beginning in late 2008. Like their previous work, this album contains many complex musical compositions, with tracks 8–14 on disc forming the 25-minute medley titled "Ashtamangala (The 8 Auspicious Symbols)"

== Track listing ==
All lyrics are written by Paul Adrian Villarreal, except where noted; all music is composed by Sun Caged

No.	Title	Length
1.	"Seamripper (& The Blanket Statement)"	8:13
2.	"Tip-Toe The Fault-Line"	6:57
3.	"Ashes To Earn"	5:18
4.	"Shades Of Hades"	5:43
5.	"Reductio ad Absurdum"	6:18
6.	"On Again / Off Again"	7:25
7.	"Lotus"	6:17
8.	"Ashtamangala (The 8 Auspicious Symbols)": I. "Pareidolized (The Ocean In The Shell)"; II. "Parasol"; III. "Wave The Banner"; IV. "Fish Afraid Of Drowning"; V. "Moebius Knot"; VI. "Full Circle"; VII. "Let It Wash Away (The Lotus Effect)""	25:48 10:00; 1:43; 1:42; 2:14; 2:26; 1:55 5:49
Total length:		72:00

== Personnel ==
=== Band members ===
- Paul Adrian Villarreal − vocals
- Marcel Coenen − lead guitar
- Rene Kroon − keyboards
- Daniel Kohn − bass
- Roel van Helden − drums and percussion

=== Production ===
- Intro by Daniel Kohn.
- Mixed by René Kroon and Marcel Coenen.
- Mastered by René Kroon
- All music written and arranged by Sun Caged
- All lyrics by Paul Adrian Villarreal.
- Produced by Sun Caged.
