= Stranger Heads Prevail =

Studio album by Thank You Scientist
- Released: July 29, 2016
- Genre: Progressive rock; progressive metal
- Length: 67:53
- Label: Evil Ink
- Producer: Tom Monda

Thank You Scientist chronology
Maps of Non-Existent Places (2012)	Stranger Heads Prevail (2016)	Terraformer (2019)

Stranger Heads Prevail is the second album by progressive rock band Thank You Scientist. It was released on July 29, 2016. It is the first album to feature Cody McCorry on bass and theremin and the final album to feature Odin Alvarez, Andrew Digrius, and Ellis Jasenovic on drums, trumpet, and saxophone, respectively, prior to their departure in 2017.

== Track listing ==
All lyrics are written by Salvatore Marrano; all music is composed by Thank You Scientist, except where noted.

No.	Title	Music	Length
1.	"Prologue: A Faint Applause..."	Tom Monda; Marrano; Mark Radice	2:03
2.	"The Somnambulist"		5:33
3.	"Caverns"		7:06
4.	"Mr. Invisible"		7:36
5.	"A Wolf in Cheap Clothing"		6:43
6.	"Blue Automatic"		5:41
7.	"Need More Input"		7:47
8.	"Rube Goldberg Variations"		8:53
9.	"Psychopomp"		9:26
10.	"The Amateur Arsonist's Handbook"		6:04
11.	"Epilogue: ...And the Clever Depart"	Tom Monda; Marrano; Mark Radice	1:07
Total length:			67:35

== Personnel ==
Thank You Scientist

- Salvatore Marrano – vocals
- Tom Monda – fretted and fretless guitar, acoustic guitar, shamisen, sitar, vocals, strings arrangement
- Cody McCorry – bass, theremin, saw
- Ben Karas – violin, viola, five string electric violin
- Ellis Jasenovic – tenor sax
- Andrew Digrius – trumpet, flugelhorn
- Odin Alvarez – drums

Additional personnel

- Mark Radice – vocals, piano, keys
- AJ Merlino – percussion (mallets and hands)
- Sean Redman – timpani
- Gergly Kiss – cello
- Tory Anne Daines – viola
- Rebecca Harris – violin
- Bumblefoot – vocals on "Prologue: A Faint Applause"
- The Spectrum Vocal Ensemble – gang vocals

Production

- Tom Monda – production
- Mike Ferretti – mixing, engineering
- Shane Stanton – assistance
- Van Dette – mastering
- Bumblefoot – additional vocal engineering on "Prologue: A Faint Applause" and "Epilogue"
- Tim High – additional vocal engineering on "Prologue" and "Epilogue: And the Clever Depart"

== Charts ==
Chart (2016)	Peak position
US Billboard 200	193
US Top Rock Albums (Billboard)	14
