= Little Brother Is Watching =

Studio album by Bumblefoot
- Released: February 24, 2015
- Genres: Progressive metal; punk rock; alternative metal; hard rock
- Length: 1:00:21
- Label: Self-released

Bumblefoot chronology
Barefoot - the acoustic ep (2008)	Little Brother Is Watching (2015)	...Returns! (2025)

Little Brother Is Watching is the eighth studio album by recording artist Ron "Bumblefoot" Thal, released on February 24, 2015. It is his first solo album of original material since 2008's Abnormal.

== Background ==
The first single from the album, "Little Brother Is Watching", was debuted on Yahoo! Music on January 28, 2015. The album was composed, produced, recorded, mixed and mastered entirely by Bumblefoot himself in his in-home studio, and features Dennis Leeflang on drums.

Thal described the title track as "... a statement on where society is right now. How we live day to day, everything we do is on display, for better or worse. I think mostly for better, but sometimes for worse. This is the world we live in. Wikileaks... a police beating... our neighbor falling on his butt. Whatever it is, or something of us we want to put on display. We're watching each other and we're being watched" He later expanded "It comes from the old George Orwell book 1984, there is a whole concept of government watching everything you do and it says “Big Brother is Watching You.” I thought about how that was what they predicted years ago. But, they didn’t predict that the people will get the technology and the people to do the watching, and that we will be able to watch over the government, watch each other, and will be exposing ourselves... and that makes us “Little Brother". Thal described the album as having "more open space, melodies, harmonies, dynamics, & production."

Thal stated that Queen, David Bowie, George Harrison & Iron Maiden were influences for the album, as well as Stevie Wonder, Manowar, and Guns N' Roses. Thal mentioned going to a David Bowie exhibit at a museum in Brazil was the catalyst for him to start writing while on the road with Guns N' Roses.

The song "Clots" described Thal's experience with a bleeding tumor and was the first song written specifically for the album. "Argentina" & "Don’t Know Who To Pray To Anymore" are songs Thal wrote with intention for collaboration with Guns N' Roses, but ended up using them for his solo album.

On April 14, 2015, Billboard.com unveiled a music video for the title track, directed by Gabriella Loutfi. The video is set in 1984 BC and features Bumblefoot as a 'Middle Eastern ruler ultimately undone by future technology'. The direction of the video was influenced by filmmaker Georges Méliès. Thal mentioned in an interview the possibility of doing a "60's Sci-Fi Ed Wood inspired" music video for the track "Women Rule the World".

== Track listing ==
No.	Title	Length
1.	"Clots"	5:33
2.	"Little Brother Is Watching"	4:56
3.	"Argentina"	6:44
4.	"Don't Know Who to Pray to Anymore"	7:43
5.	"Livin' the Dream"	4:31
6.	"Cuterebra"	5:09
7.	"Higher"	6:40
8.	"Women Rule the World"	5:06
9.	"Sleepwalking"	4:39
10.	"Eternity"	4:05
11.	"Never Again"	5:15
Total length:		1:00:21

== Personnel ==
- Ron "Bumblefoot" Thal - bass, guitars, cello, percussion, vocals
- Dennis Leeflang - drums
