= Dennis Leeflang =

Dutch rock drummer (born 1979)

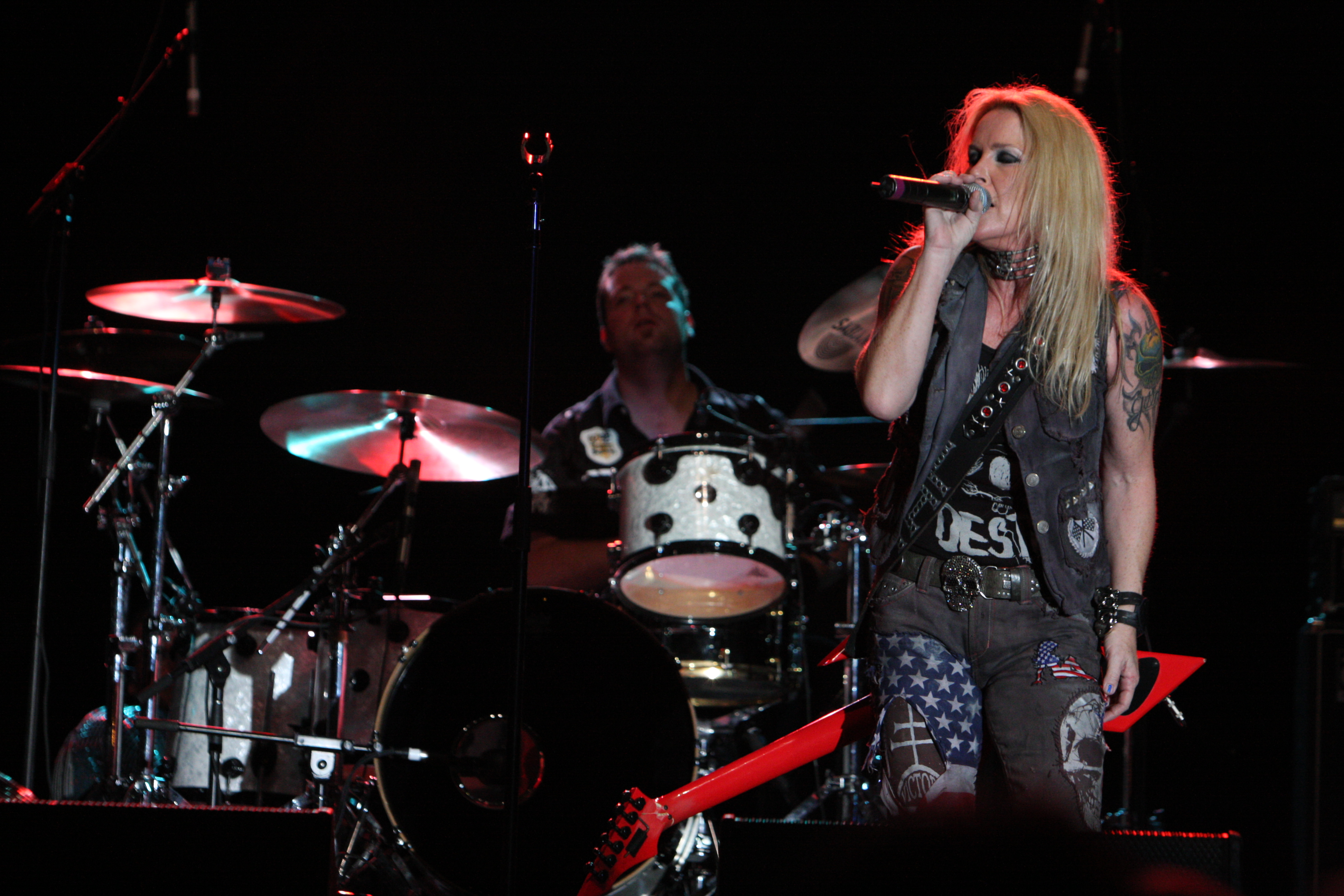
- Leeflang in 2009, backing Lita Ford

Background information
- Born: 22 May 1979 (age 46); Leiderdorp, Netherlands
- Genres: Rock
- Occupations: Musician, producer
- Instrument: Drums
- Years active: 1987–present
- Website: www.dennisleeflang.com

Dennis Leeflang (born 22 May 1979, in Leiderdorp) is a Dutch rock drummer, currently living in Los Angeles. He is best known for his work with Ron "Bumblefoot" Thal.

== History ==
Leeflang started playing the drums at age 13, playing along with records of bands such as Nirvana, Guns N' Roses, Metallica and Iron Maiden. He started playing with local hard rock bands. In 1996, he joined Dutch gothic rock band Within Temptation at age 17 as their first official drummer.

Leeflang played with various other Dutch rock and metal bands between 1997 and 2004, with one notable band being the Saturnine, before relocating from the Netherlands to New York City, shortly after having departed his band Sun Caged, of which he was a founding member. In 2006, Leeflang rejoined the Saturnine as an inter-continental recording project with occasional live performances in Europe.

Leeflang had been Ron "Bumblefoot" Thal's live drummer for European tours since 2002, but became his full-time drummer after moving to New York in 2004. Leeflang recorded a song with Bumblefoot in 2003, but his first full album with Bumblefoot was Normal in 2005. This was followed by the 2008 album Abnormal. In 2015, Leeflang and Bumblefoot released the album Little Brother Is Watching. With Bumblefoot, Leeflang toured extensively between 2002 and 2015.

Leeflang has recorded drums for many artists, including Anneke van Giersbergen, Tiffany Giardina, Ted Poley, Angus Clark and Russian pop star Zemfira. He has worked with producers such as Ken Caillat, Mikal Blue, PJ Bianco, Nick Sansano and Easy Mo Bee. In the summer of 2009, Leeflang toured with Lita Ford in Europe and the US as part of her come-back tour after a 16-year hiatus from the music industry. In late 2015, he toured with Dilana. He is currently the drummer for country artist Liam Mogan.

When not touring, Dennis works out of his recording studio in Los Angeles, California, as a session drummer and recording engineer.

Dennis is also a founding member (along with Chris Szkup and Richard Anderson), Drummer and Mixing Engineer for the worldwide studio project The Feckers, some of the people who have recorded with The Feckers include Ron "Bumblefoot" Thal, Neil Murray, Tommy Denander, Richard Fortus, Brett Garsed, Kyle Whalum, Melvin Brannon Jr, Lydia Salnikova, Tony Franklin, Joey Huffman, Jonathon Noyce, Alessandro Bertoni, Chris Sligh, Tūranga Morgan-Edwards, Kyle Thomas, Zak Lloyd.

== Equipment ==
Leeflang endorses Paiste cymbals, Pro-Mark drum sticks, Evans drumheads, and Ahead Products (Armor Cases, snare drums, accessories).

Preceded by Richard Willemse	Drummer for Within Temptation; 1996	Succeeded by Ivar de Graaf
New title	Drummer for Sun Caged; 1999–2003	Succeeded by Roel van Helden
New title	Drummer for The Saturnine since 2003	Incumbent
Preceded by LaFrae Olivia Sci	Drummer for Bumblefoot since 2002	Incumbent
