= Are You Kidding Me? No. =

Studio album by Destrage
- Released: March 4, 2014
- Recorded: RecLab Studio, Adrenaline Studio, Italy, 2012
- Genre: Progressive metalcore
- Length: 49:26
- Label: Metal Blade Records
- Producer: Destrage and Imago Omnia

Destrage chronology
The King Is Fat'n'Old (2010)	Are You Kidding Me? No. (2014)	A Means to No End (2016)

Are You Kidding Me? No. is the third studio album by the Italian progressive metalcore band Destrage, released on March 4, 2014, by Metal Blade Records.

== Track listing ==
All lyrics were written by Matteo Di Gioia and Paolo Colavolpe, and all music was written by Destrage.

No.	Title	Length
1.	"Destroy Create Transform Sublimate"	5:24
2.	"Purania"	5:01
3.	"My Green Neighbour"	4:12
4.	"Hosts, Rifles & Coke"	3:42
5.	"G.O.D."	3:33
6.	"Where the Things Have No Colour"	6:38
7.	"Waterpark Bachelorette"	4:33
8.	"Before, After and All Around"	4:24
9.	"-(Obedience)"	4:17
10.	"Are You Kidding Me? No. (feat. Ron "Bumblefoot" Thal)"	7:42
Total length:		49:26

Professional ratings
Review scores
Source	Rating
The PRP	4/5 stars

== Personnel ==
Destrage

- Paolo Colavolpe – vocals
- Matteo Di Gioia – guitar
- Ralph Salati – guitar
- Gabriel Pignata – bass
- Federico Paulovich – drums

Additional performer

- Ron "Bumblefoot" Thal – fretless guitar (track 10)
