= Sun Caged (album) =

Studio album by Sun Caged
- Released: 22 October 2003 (Netherlands) 21 November 2003
- Recorded: February–March 2003
- Genre: Progressive metal
- Length: 58:57
- Label: Lion Music
- Producer: Arjen Anthony Lucassen

Sun Caged chronology
Promo 2002 (2002)	Sun Caged (2003)	Promo 2005 (2005)

Sun Caged is the debut full-length studio album by the Dutch progressive metal band Sun Caged, released on 22 October 2003 by Lion Music. The album was mixed by Arjen Lucassen.

== Track listing ==
1. "Sedation" − 7:57
2. "Sun Caged" − 6:23
3. "Home" − 6:37
4. "Soil" − 6:52
5. "Hollow" − 5:12
6. "Closing In" − 5:58
7. "The Eighth Day" − 5:41
8. "Secrets of Flight" − 9:07
9. "Unchanging" − 5:09

== Credits ==
=== Band members ===
- Marcel Coenen − guitars
- Dennis Leeflang − drums
- Rob Van Der Loo − bass
- Joost van den Broek − keyboards
- André Vuurboom − vocals

=== Other ===
- Drums and guitars recorded at Studio Moskou, Utrecht, The Netherlands, engineered by Silvia Vermeulen.
- Bass, keyboards and vocals recorded at Joost's home-studio, engineered by Joost van den Broek.
- Mixed by Arjen Anthony Lucassen at The Electric Castle.
- Mastered by Peter van 't Riet at Sound Factory, Rotterdam, The Netherlands.
- Photos by Nico Wobben and Petra Guijt.
- Artwork and layout by Marco Jeurissen / 101 images at www.101images.com.
