= The Adventures of Bumblefoot =

Studio album by Ron Thal
- Released: May 1995
- Genre: Progressive rock
- Length: 48:31
- Labels: Shrapnel (US), Roadrunner (Europe-Japan)
- Producer: Ron Thal

Ron Thal chronology
| The Adventures of Bumblefoot (1995) | Hermit (1997) |

The Adventures of Bumblefoot (and other tales of woe...) is the debut solo studio album by recording artist Ron "Bumblefoot" Thal, released in May 1995. All song titles were derived from the names of various animal diseases. Everything was recorded in Thal's parents' basement, with some songs already previously recorded. "Blue Tongue" was written in 1989 and "Malignant Carbuncle" in 1991. The title track, "Bumblefoot", was recorded in May 1993 (and is included on the guitar comp CD Guitar On the Edge No. 4). Thal started writing and recording the rest of what would become the final album in the summer of 1994 and was finished in October 1994. There are two bonus tracks on the album - one is a vocal track recorded by Thal when he was 17 about the polluted fish in the surrounding waters of Staten Island NY and the other is a poem where Thal took spoken words and converted them into music code then played on the guitar.

After being out of print for many years, The Adventures of Bumblefoot was re-released in August 2010 as a 15th Anniversary Edition CD. In commemoration of the Anniversary edition, Thal also released a 200-page transcription book of the recording which he transcribed. The re-release includes the original 1995 recording and also several bonus tracks written and recorded by Thal which were used as the soundtrack for the Sega CD video game Wild Woody. Young Guitar Magazine (Japan) just recently included Thal's The Adventures of Bumblefoot as one of their Top 500 Masterpiece albums.

== Track listings ==
| No. | Title | Length |
|---|---|---|
| 1. | "Bumblefoot" | 3:44 |
| 2. | "Orf" | 5:25 |
| 3. | "Scrapie" | 3:07 |
| 4. | "Blue Tongue" | 3:38 |
| 5. | "Limberneck" | 1:16 |
| 6. | "Q Fever" | 6:18 |
| 7. | "Strawberry Footrot" | 3:30 |
| 8. | "Ick" | 4:36 |
| 9. | "Malignant Carbuncle" | 1:32 |
| 10. | "Rinderpest" | 4:16 |
| 11. | "Strangles" | 3:38 |
| 12. | "Fistulous Withers" | 7:35 |
| 13. | "Poem (bonus track)" | 2:38 |
| 14. | "Shell on the Sand (bonus track)" | 0:59 |
| Total length: | | 48:31 |

Notes

- "Fistulous Withers", "Poem" and "Shell on the Sand" appear as an unbroken track; the 7:35 duration reflects the combined track length of all 3 songs.

=== 2010 anniversary re-release ===
| No. | Title | Length |
|---|---|---|
| 1. | "Bumblefoot" | 3:44 |
| 2. | "Orf" | 5:25 |
| 3. | "Scrapie" | 3:07 |
| 4. | "Blue Tongue" | 3:38 |
| 5. | "Limberneck" | 1:16 |
| 6. | "Q Fever" | 6:18 |
| 7. | "Strawberry Footrot" | 3:30 |
| 8. | "Ick" | 4:36 |
| 9. | "Malignant Carbuncle" | 1:32 |
| 10. | "Rinderpest" | 4:16 |
| 11. | "Strangles" | 3:38 |
| 12. | "Fistulous Withers" | 7:35 |
| 13. | "Poem (bonus track)" | 2:38 |
| 14. | "Shell on the Sand (bonus track)" | 0:59 |
| 15. | "Pirate Level 2 (bonus track from Wild Woody soundtrack)" | 1:56 |
| 16. | "Mythology Level 2 (bonus track from Wild Woody soundtrack)" | 2:22 |
| 17. | "Sci-Fi Level 3 (bonus track from Wild Woody soundtrack)" | 1:51 |
| 18. | "Cemetery Level 2 (bonus track from Wild Woody soundtrack)" | 2:05 |
| 19. | "Cemetery Level 1 (bonus track from Wild Woody soundtrack)" | 2:03 |
| Total length: | | 58:50 |

== Personnel ==
- Ron Thal - produced, engineered, mixed, drum programming, bass, guitars, groans, grunts and cover art
- Chris Piazza - slap bass on "Bumblefoot"
- JB - timbales on "Ick"
