= Forgotten Anthology =

Compilation album by Bumblefoot
- Released: April 2003
- Recorded: 1995–2002
- Genre: Grunge, rock, hard rock, progressive rock
- Length: 70:47
- Label: Hermit Inc.

Bumblefoot chronology
Uncool (2002)	Forgotten Anthology (2003)	Normal (2005)

Forgotten Anthology is the sixth album by recording artist Ron "Bumblefoot" Thal released in April 2003. It is a compilation CD consisting of previously unreleased tracks recorded between 1995 - 2002. The CD also includes songs originally intended to be included on Thal's 2002 studio album release Uncool as well as alternate versions of songs from the 2000 French only release. Thal mentioned "Heart Attack" as being one of his favorite songs he's ever written. The song "Bagged a Big 1" was written after Thal was arrested for the second time at age 26. The song "Day To Remember" is used as the theme song for That Metal Show.

== Track listing ==
No.	Title	Length
1.	"Old"	3:29
2.	"Thought I Could Fly"	5:13
3.	"Apathy"	5:40
4.	"Shell"	7:30
5.	"Meat"	4:15
6.	"Day To Remember"	3:27
7.	"Bagged A Big 1"	2:54
8.	"Mine"	2:37
9.	"Heart Attack"	3:22
10.	"Girl Like You"	4:42
11.	"Crunch"	3:52
12.	"Maricona"	2:12
13.	"13"	2:22
14.	"She Knows"	3:13
15.	"Myth"	3:47
16.	"A Way Out"	3:47
17.	"Wasted Away"	5:14
18.	"Mafalda"	3:23
Total length:		70:47

== Recordings in chronological order ==
- 1995 – "Old", "Thought I Could Fly", "Apathy", "Shell"
- 1998 – "Meat", "Day To Remember", "Bagged A Big 1", "Mine", "Heart Attack", "Girl Like You"
- 1999 – "Crunch", "Maricona", "She Knows", "Myth"
- 2000 – "A Way Out", "Wasted Away"
- 2002 – "Mafalda"
