= The Madness (Art of Anarchy album) =

Studio album by Art of Anarchy
- Released: March 24, 2017
- Recorded: 2016
- Genre: Hard rock, alternative metal
- Length: 36:27
- Label: Another Century
- Producer: Ron "Bumblefoot" Thal; Howard Benson (track 6)

Art of Anarchy chronology
Art of Anarchy (2015)	The Madness (2017)	Let There Be Anarchy (2024)

Singles from The Madness
- 1. "The Madness" Released: October 7, 2016; 2. "Changed Man" Released: March 17, 2017; 3. "Echo of a Scream" Released: July 31, 2017

The Madness is the second studio album by American rock band Art of Anarchy, released on March 24, 2017. It is the only album to feature vocalist Scott Stapp and the last album to feature bassist John Moyer. According to Loudwire, the band took "a new direction" with their music on the album.

== Reception ==
Professional ratings
Review scores
Source	Rating
AllMusic	3.5/5 stars

Chad Childers from Loudwire reviewed the album, stating "The musicianship is strong, the writing connects and they have a disc that could go deep in terms of radio singles. The Madness is just the beginning of what looks like a bright future".

== Track listing ==
All tracks are written by Scott Stapp, Jon Votta, Vince Votta, John Moyer, and Ron "Bumblefoot" Thal except where noted.

No.	Title	Writer(s)	Length
1.	"Echo of a Scream"	Stapp; J. Votta; V. Votta; Moyer; Thal; Zac Maloy; David Draiman; Logan Mader	3:34
2.	"1000 Degrees"	Stapp; Maloy; Blair Daly	3:40
3.	"No Surrender"		3:24
4.	"The Madness"		3:38
5.	"Won't Let You Down"		3:30
6.	"Changed Man"		4:02
7.	"A Light in Me"	Stapp; J. Votta; V. Votta; Moyer; Thal; Maloy; Mark Holman	3:10
8.	"Somber"	Stapp; Alex Bodnar	4:12
9.	"Dancing with the Devil"	Stapp; Marti Frederiksen	3:37
10.	"Afterburn"		3:40
Total length:			36:27

Japanese edition bonus tracks
No.	Title	Length
11.	"Won't Let You Down" (acoustic)	3:38
12.	"Dancing with the Devil" (acoustic)	3:38
Total length:		43:43

== Personnel ==
Art of Anarchy

- Ron "Bumblefoot" Thal – lead and rhythm guitar, backing vocals, engineer, mixing, producer, mastering
- Jon Votta – rhythm and lead guitar, backing vocals
- Scott Stapp – lead vocals
- John Moyer – bass guitar, backing vocals
- Vince Votta – drums, percussion

Additional personnel

- Howard Benson – producer (track 6)
- Marc Sasso – artwork, design, layout
- Annie Atlasman – photography
- Mick Rock – studio photography
- Kristen Gomez – photo edits
