= Barefoot – The Acoustic EP =

Barefoot - the acoustic ep

EP by Bumblefoot
- Released: December 2008
- Genre: Acoustic rock
- Length: 54:27
- Label: Self-released

Bumblefoot chronology
| Abnormal (2008) | Barefoot - the acoustic ep (2008) | Little Brother is Watching (2015) |

Barefoot (the acoustic ep) is the first EP by recording artist Ron "Bumblefoot" Thal, released in December 2008. Barefoot is the first collection of acoustic recordings by Thal. The CD contains re-interpretations of his own songs, in both instrumental and vocal versions, in an acoustic style.

== Track listing ==
| No. | Title | Length |
|---|---|---|
| 1. | "She Knows" (Acoustic) | 3:08 |
| 2. | "Dash" (Acoustic) | 6:13 |
| 3. | "Simple Days" (Acoustic) | 4:12 |
| 4. | "Shadow" (Acoustic) | 5:43 |
| 5. | "Abnormal" (Acoustic-Explicit Version) | 3:35 |
| 6. | "She Knows" (Acoustic-Instrumental) | 3:10 |
| 7. | "Dash" (Acoustic-Instrumental) | 6:13 |
| 8. | "Simple Days" (Acoustic-Instrumental) | 4:12 |
| 9. | "Shadow" (Acoustic-Instrumental) | 5:45 |
| 10. | "Abnormal" (Acoustic-Instrumental) | 3:35 |
| 11. | "Delilah" (Unplugged Version) | 5:01 |
| 12. | "Abnormal" (Acoustic-Clean Version) | 3:35 |
| Total length: | | 54:27 |
