= Wild Woody =

1995 video game by Sega

- North American cover art
- Developer: Sega Multimedia Studio
- Publisher: Sega
- Directors: Gordon Haberfelde; Chris Shen
- Producer: Gordon Haberfelde
- Designers: Chris Shen; Bruce Krueger; Doug Lanford
- Programmers: Dan Hitchens; David Marshall
- Artists: John Broenen; Mimi Doggett
- Composer: Ron "Bumblefoot" Thal
- Platform: Sega CD
- Release: September 1995
- Genre: Platform
- Mode: Single-player

Wild Woody is a 1995 platform video game developed and published by Sega for the Sega CD. The game's premise is centered on the eponymous character, an anthropomorphic talking pencil who must gather the scattered segments of the totem pole that brought him to life. Woody is capable of erasing enemies and obstacles as well as creating sketches to destroy enemies or improve his navigation.

Wild Woody was developed by Sega Multimedia Studio and regarded by its development team as a swan song for the Sega CD platform; Sega Multimedia Studio also dissolved by the time of its release. Wild Woody includes 3D-rendered cutscenes featuring motion capture animation for Woody. The game was poorly received by critics for its controls and visuals, and it failed to make a commercial impact.

== Gameplay ==
An example of gameplay in Wild Woody

Wild Woody is a side-scrolling platform game in which the player controls the titular character Woody, an anthropomorphic pencil. Woody was brought to life by the bottom segment of a miniature totem pole, and is tasked with retrieving the five scattered segments of the totem pole from the worlds they have created for themselves.

Woody can erase enemy characters by jumping onto them, and can erase certain walls and floors that impede his progress. Woody can also create living beings from collectible sketches to destroy enemies or improve navigation through the levels. The sketches Woody collects will be added to his personal sketchbook, which is available in the game's pause screen and allows the player to select a particular sketch for use. Woody is capable of drawing from three consecutive sketches before he becomes too short to draw again. Woody's length can be restored by collecting pencils.

The game consists of five levels, each divided into two acts and a boss encounter. The first act of each level includes eight scattered puzzle pieces. If all eight pieces are collected and the first act is completed, a bonus level will initiate before the beginning of the second act. In these levels, Woody must navigate through a maze, collect sketches and extra lives, and reach the end within a limited time. The game is complete when all levels have been cleared and all totem pole pieces have been recovered.

== Plot ==
Dusty, an adventurer, returns to his office with a miniature totem pole consisting of six heads, and is immediately called to a rescue mission in Sumatra. As a result, he misses a message from an anthropologist on his answering machine explaining that "on the third Wednesday of July under a full moon during a snowfall", the totem pole's power would be released; its segments scatter and create parallel universes for themselves, which threatens to destroy the world. The bottom segment, Low Man, brings one of Dusty's pencils to life as a means to recover the scattered totem pieces. The pencil, who is able to create living sketches, christens himself "Wild Woody" and eagerly undertakes the task of saving the world. Under Low Man's instruction, Woody recovers Squid Lips from a pirate book, Brimstone from a painting of Mount Olympus, Lugnuts from a mechanism blueprint, Orbit from a science fiction comic book, and Tombstone from a discarded flyer. Upon the totem pole's completion, Low Man grants Woody his wish for a paintbrush girlfriend and promises to see him again the next time the world needs saving, which Woody doubts.

== Development and release ==
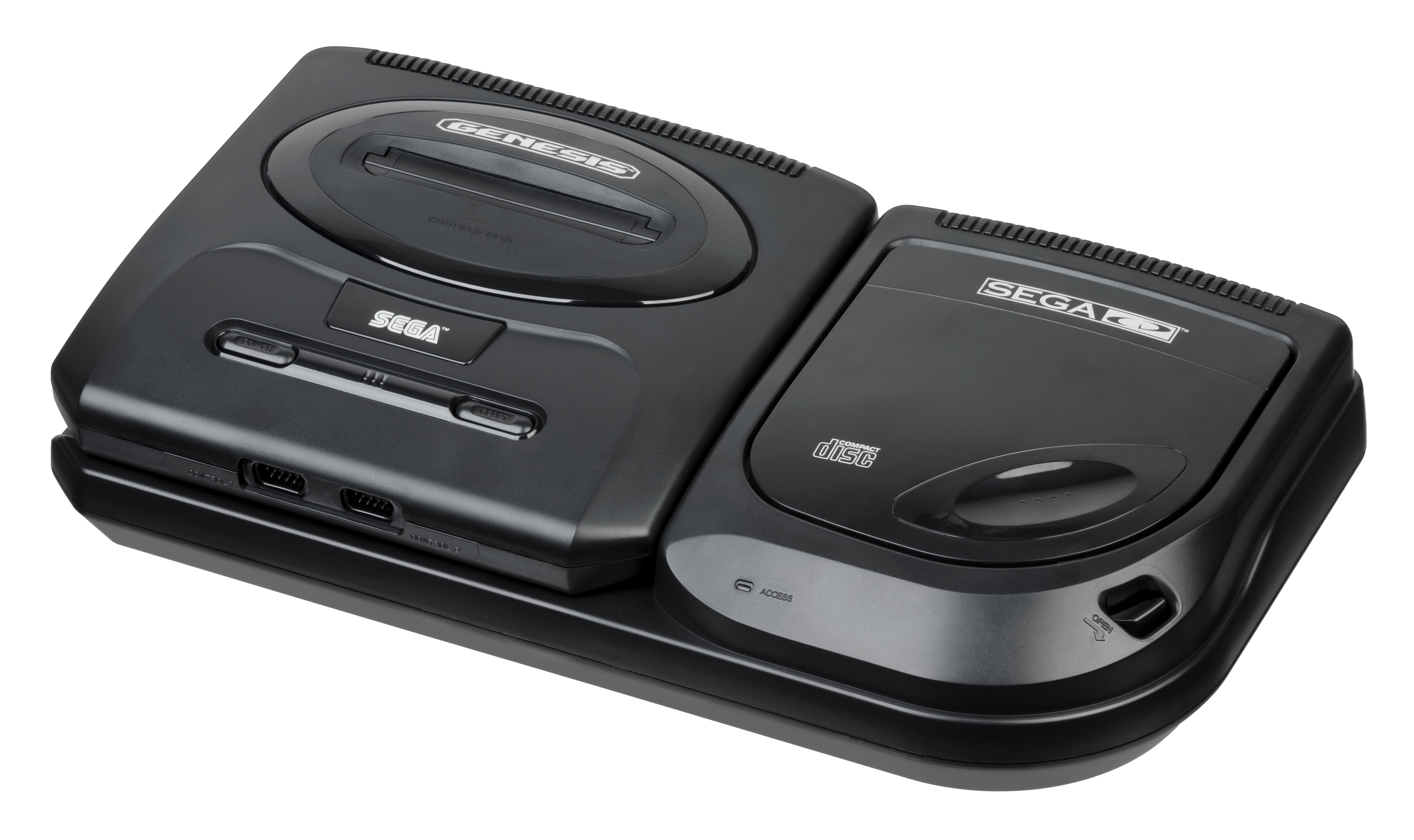
Wild Woody was regarded by Sega Multimedia Studio as the swan song for the Sega CD accessory.

Following the completion of Sega Multimedia Studio's Jurassic Park for the Sega CD, the studio was divided into two teams. While one team was tasked with researching games for the upcoming Sega Saturn, the other began developing the game Wild Woody, which was regarded by the team as the Sega CD's swan song. Doug Lanford, while credited as a designer, was paid as a junior programmer and created much of the game's engine. The character animation during gameplay was created by scanning hand-drawn frames that were then colored and cleaned digitally, while the animation for Woody during the cutscenes was created via motion capture performed by Donald Hom. The characters Woody and the totem pole segment Low Man are respectively voiced by Joe Kerska and Jeff Farber. Other voices were provided by Bruce Robertson and Debbie Rogers. Lanford hid an easter egg within the second act of the game's first level that would render a mermaid – one of many beings created from the sketch mechanic – topless if four hidden items are collected in a certain order. While Lanford did not create the animation, he was amused enough to allow its incorporation.

Spencer Nilsen, head of Sega of America's music department and the game's executive music producer, recruited Ron "Bumblefoot" Thal to compose and produce the game's soundtrack. Thal speculatively attributed his hiring by Sega to the close proximity between Sega of America's headquarters and the record label Shrapnel Records, which would have increased the chance of Sega's management being exposed to his debut album The Adventures of Bumblefoot. Thal was given a 28-day deadline to create a score consisting of a title theme, 16 game level themes, and tracks for six story cutscenes and five game over sequences. His central strategy for composing the score was to begin silly and light-hearted and evolve in intensity toward the game's climax; he applied the same strategy within each of the game's five levels from the first to third acts. The soundtrack includes a lyrical vocal song titled "Yo Ho!", a diss track toward the player by the boss of the pirate-themed level. The song was stylistically influenced by Rage Against the Machine, Red Hot Chili Peppers, Faith No More, and 24-7 Spyz. Thal performed the bass, guitar, vocals and keyboard himself, while the drums were performed by Brad Kaiser. The soundtrack was recorded and mixed in February 1995.

By the time of Wild Woody's release by September 1995, the Sega CD was near the end of its life cycle, and Sega Multimedia Studio had dissolved. As predicted by the development team, distribution of Wild Woody was quickly relegated to bargain bins.

== Reception and legacy ==
Reception

Review scores
Publication	Score
Electronic Gaming Monthly	6/10, 6/10, 6.5/10, 4/10
Game Informer	3/10
GamePro	7/20
VideoGames	6/10

Critical reception to Wild Woody was generally poor. A reviewer for VideoGames noted the high amount of erasable elements and described the music as "lots of wacky toe-tappers", but found the visuals to be "a little grainy". The four reviewers of Electronic Gaming Monthly agreed that the ability to draw up necessary items is interesting, but that the controls make erasing enemies difficult and there are frequent cheap hits. The Pencil Grinder of GamePro criticized the poor controls when jumping and summarized that "Woody comes up short in every department." The game's title has been widely criticized for its sexually suggestive nature. In response, Doug Lanford agreed that the title was "tragic" and recalled that it was subject to several jokes by the development team. Wild Woody failed to make a commercial impact, which Lanford attributed to its late release in the 16-bit era, questionable character design and standard platforming gameplay.

In a retrospective review for Wild Woody, a writer for Game Informer lambasted the game as "tremendously putrid" and "one of the most impotent games in the Sega CD's pathetic library". The writer particularly criticized the "awful" cutscenes and inconsistent controls which resulted in "unavoidable" damage from enemies, but acknowledged the music's high quality. Duke Ferris of GameRevolution and K. Thor Jensen of UGO Networks respectively included Wild Woody in their lists of "50 Worst Game Names Ever" and "Worst Cutscenes in Gaming History". Evan Hopkins of Screen Rant felt that the game's "eye-searing" cutscenes, "x-treme" attitude and obnoxious mascot character made Wild Woody "a perfect allegory for the failure of the Sega CD". He criticized the game's controls as "remarkably clunky" and lending to an unfairly steep difficulty level.

On April 1, 2024, Woody was added as a playable character to the independent pornographic kart racing game Shady Lewd Kart via downloadable content. The addition was made with the blessing of the original creative team, with Joe Kerska reprising his voice role as Woody.
