= Hands (Bumblefoot album) =

Studio album by Bumblefoot
- Released: March 1998
- Genre: Progressive metal; funk metal; rap metal; alternative metal
- Length: 58:49
- Label: Hermit Inc.

Bumblefoot chronology
| Hermit (1997) | Hands (1998) | 9.11 (2001) |

Hands is the third studio album by recording artist Ron "Bumblefoot" Thal released in March 1998. This was his first release under the Bumblefoot name, and his first release under his own production company Hermit, Inc.

== Track listing ==
| No. | Title | Length |
|---|---|---|
| 1. | "Hands" | 6:11 |
| 2. | "Swatting Flies" | 4:06 |
| 3. | "What I Knew" | 2:42 |
| 4. | "Shrunk" | 4:00 |
| 5. | "Dummy" | 3:04 |
| 6. | "Chair Ass" | 2:35 |
| 7. | "Noseplugs" | 4:11 |
| 8. | "Vomit" | 3:45 |
| 9. | "Brooklyn Steakhouse" | 4:02 |
| 10. | "Drunk" | 6:04 |
| 11. | "Backfur" | 3:44 |
| 12. | "Tuesday in Nancy" | 2:44 |
| 13. | "Dirty Pant’loons" | 5:17 |
| 14. | "Cactus - Hidden Track (No.69)" | 5:30 |
| 15. | "Trainwreck - Hidden Track (No. 85)" | 1:24 |
| Total length: | | 58:49 |

== Personnel ==
- Ron Thal - guitars, basses, vocals
- Jeff Thal - drums
- Suzanne Bass - cello
- Daniel Alvaro - saxophone
- Orlando Oquendo - trombone
