= Uncool (album) =

Studio album by Bumblefoot
- Released: February 2002
- Genre: Hard rock, heavy metal, grunge
- Length: 66:46
- Label: Hermit Inc.

Bumblefoot chronology
9.11 (2001)	Uncool (2002)	Forgotten Anthology (2003)

Uncool is the fifth studio album by recording artist Ron "Bumblefoot" Thal released in February 2002. This is his third release under the Bumblefoot name. Uncool was originally released in 2000 only in France. The 2002 release contains two cover songs not included on the French version - "What's New Pussycat?" by Burt Bacharach and "Can't Take My Eyes Off You" sung by Frankie Valli. Songs excluded from the American release but on the French release were eventually included on Thal's Forgotten Anthology CD released in 2003.

== Track listing ==
No.	Title	Writer(s)	Original artist	Length
1.	"BBF Takes the Mic"			0:39
2.	"Go"			3:11
3.	"T Jonez"			3:39
4.	"My World Is You"			2:02
5.	"Dominated"			2:59
6.	"Kiss the Ring"			2:31
7.	"What's New Pussycat?"	Burt Bacharach	Tom Jones	2:28
8.	"I Hate Me More Than I Love You"			3:56
9.	"Delilah"			4:31
10.	"Ronald's Comin' Back Now"			4:37
11.	"BBF Says Goodnight"			1:52
12.	"Can't Take My Eyes Off You"	Bob Crewe Bob Gaudio	Frankie Valli	3:53
13.	"Hidden Track"
Total length:				36:46

== Track listing (French release) ==
No.	Title	Length
1.	"Intro"	0:38
2.	"Go"	3:12
3.	"T Jonez"	3:39
4.	"My World Is You"	2:02
5.	"Crunch"	3:52
6.	"I Hate Me More Than I Love You"	3:54
7.	"Kiss The Ring"	2:31
8.	"Delilah"	4:31
9.	"Dominated"	2:59
10.	"R2"	2:50
11.	"Ronald's Comin' Back Now"	4:38
12.	"Maricona"	2:11
13.	"Mine"	2:22
14.	"Heart Attack"	6:00
15.	"Girl Like You"	4:42
16.	"Finale"	1:52
17.	"We Don't Care"	1:50
Total length:		53:35

== Personnel ==
- Ron "Bumblefoot" Thal - Guitars, vocals
- Lafrae Olivia Sci - drums on tracks 1, 2, 3, 4, 6, 7
- Sanford Oxenbery - drums on tracks 9, 11
- Joe Bergamini - drums on tracks 5, 8, 10
- Joe Bedford - drums on "Can't Take My Eyes Off You"
- Frank Rao - bass on tracks 2, 5, 10
- Thorndike Applethorple - all other bass tracks
- Neil Alexander - piano on tracks 2, 10
- Ray Porrigsworth - piano on 11
- Lea DeMartini - flute on "Delilah"
- Cletus Xalapagous - flute on 7, 8, 11
- NJ Brunswick Brass - horns on tracks 10, 12
- Herbert Wellington - tuba on "What's New Pussycat?"
- Filbert Murray, Zachary Torme - cellos on "TJonez"
- Callista & Beatrice Beans - violins on "Ronald's Comin' Back Now"
- Ndjiwanta - Nigerian hymn vocals on "TJonez"
- The Wilson Bennett Vocestra - vocal harmonies on tracks 3, 4, 7, 8, 9, 10
- John Pec, Ben Bartlett - backing vocals on "Can't Take My Eyes Off You"
- Anomos - guest lyricist on "I Hate Me More Than I Love You"
- David Horenstein - guest vocalist on "Can't Take My Eyes Off You"
