= Appetite for Democracy 3D =

Video by Guns N' Roses
- Released: July 1, 2014; November 4, 2014 (deluxe edition)
- Recorded: November 21, 2012
- Venues: The Joint (Las Vegas, United States)
- Genres: Hard rock, heavy metal, glam metal
- Length: 2:47:13
- Label: Interscope/Universal
- Director: Kerry Asmussen
- Producer: Barry Summers

Guns N' Roses chronology
Chinese Democracy (2008)	Appetite for Democracy 3D (2014)	Appetite for Destruction: Locked N' Loaded edition (2018)

Appetite for Democracy 3D is a live concert film by Guns N' Roses, filmed live at The Joint at the Hard Rock Casino in Las Vegas on November 21, 2012, on the tenth night of their residency, as part of the Appetite for Democracy tour in celebration of twenty-five years of Appetite for Destruction and four years of Chinese Democracy. This is the first live DVD release of Guns N' Roses since Use Your Illusion I and Use Your Illusion II in 1992. The show was filmed entirely in 3D and was produced by Barry Summers from Rock Fuel Media. The cover art features part of the original banned cover art from Appetite For Destruction. The album was officially revealed on May 29, 2014.

The DVD sold 4,800 copies in the United States its first week. The DVD debuted #1 on the Billboard music video sales chart, selling 6,400 copies its first two weeks. It also won Best 3D Music Entertainment Feature at the 2015 International 3D & Advanced Imaging Society Awards.

Videos of the band performing "Chinese Democracy", "November Rain", "Sweet Child O' Mine", "You Could Be Mine" and "Welcome to the Jungle" were released to the band's Vevo channel as promotional material.

== Reception ==
Antimusic gave the DVD 5 out of 5 stars, stating "the combination of excellent musicianship, mesmerizing rock 'n' roll stage presence and superior film work make this show practically jump right into your lap". In a negative review, This Is Not A Scene stated "Guns N' Roses were once dubbed ‘the most dangerous band in the world’; change the word ‘dangerous’ for ‘hilarious’ or ’embarrassing’ and that pretty much sums up what they represent on this package. A total train wreck." Metal.de's Alex Klug gave the release 7 out of 10.

== Formats ==
- Standard Amaray DVD – full show and bonus interviews.
- Standard 3D Blu-ray – 3D and 2D on 1 disc. Picture format: 1080P, sound format: 5.1 channel DTS-HD Master Audio.
- Digital Long Form – full content available for digital download and via Mobile App.
- Deluxe Edition – 5.1 3D Blu-ray / 2CD / T-shirt bundle

== Track listing ==
Both the video (DVD/Blu-ray) version and the CD contain 25 tracks, with disc 1 of the CD containing tracks 1–13, and disc 2 containing tracks 14–25.

No.	Title	Writer(s)	Original Album	Length
1.	"Chinese Democracy"	Axl Rose, Josh Freese, Eric Caudieux, Caram Castanzo, Robin Finck, Dizzy Reed, Tommy Stinson, Paul Tobias	Chinese Democracy	3:34
2.	"Welcome to the Jungle"	Guns N' Roses	Appetite for Destruction	5:20
3.	"It's So Easy"	Guns N' Roses, West Arkeen	Appetite for Destruction	3:15
4.	"Mr. Brownstone"	Guns N' Roses	Appetite for Destruction	4:32
5.	"Estranged"	Rose	Use Your Illusion II	9:04
6.	"Rocket Queen"	Guns N' Roses	Appetite for Destruction	7:14
7.	"Live and Let Die" (Paul McCartney & Wings cover)	Linda McCartney, Paul McCartney	Use Your Illusion I	3:06
8.	"This I Love"	Rose	Chinese Democracy	5:26
9.	"Better"	Rose, Finck	Chinese Democracy	5:08
10.	"Motivation"	Stinson	Village Gorilla Head (Tommy Stinson album)	3:15
11.	"Catcher in the Rye"	Rose, Stinson, Reed, Finck, Tobias	Chinese Democracy	5:54
12.	"Street of Dreams"	Rose, Stinson, Reed, Finck, Tobias	Chinese Democracy	4:49
13.	"You Could Be Mine"	Rose, Izzy Stradlin	Use Your Illusion II	6:45
14.	"Sweet Child o' Mine"	Guns N' Roses	Appetite for Destruction	5:38
15.	"Another Brick in the Wall Part 2" (Pink Floyd cover)	Roger Waters		2:08
16.	"November Rain"	Rose	Use Your Illusion I	8:40
17.	"Objectify"	Bumblefoot	Abnormal (Bumblefoot album)	3:36
18.	"Don't Cry"	Rose, Stradlin	Use Your Illusion I	5:41
19.	"Civil War"	Duff McKagan, Rose, Slash	Use Your Illusion II	7:23
20.	"The Seeker" (The Who cover)	Pete Townshend		4:20
21.	"Knockin' on Heaven's Door" (Bob Dylan cover)	Bob Dylan	Use Your Illusion II	12:30
22.	"Nightrain"	Guns N' Roses	Appetite for Destruction	5:40
23.	"Used to Love Her"	Guns N' Roses	G N' R Lies	3:08
24.	"Patience"	Guns N' Roses	G N' R Lies	6:31
25.	"Paradise City"	Guns N' Roses	Appetite for Destruction	7:47

== Personnel ==
Credits are adapted from the DVD's liner notes.

=== Guns N’ Roses ===
- W. Axl Rose – lead vocals, piano on "Another Brick in the Wall Part 2" and "November Rain", whistling on "Patience", whistle on "Paradise City" and "Nightrain”
- Dizzy Reed – keyboards, piano on "Estranged", "This I Love", "Catcher in the Rye", "Street of Dreams", and "Nightrain", percussion on "Welcome to The Jungle", "Mr. Brownstone", "Rocket Queen" and "You Could Be Mine", and backing vocals
- Tommy Stinson – bass, backing vocals, lead vocals on "Motivation"
- DJ Ashba – lead guitar, rhythm guitar
- Ron "Bumblefoot" Thal – lead guitar, rhythm guitar, acoustic guitar on "Used to Love Her" and "Patience", backing vocals, lead vocals on "Objectify"
- Richard Fortus – rhythm guitar, lead guitar, acoustic guitar on "Patience", slide guitar on "Rocket Queen", backing vocals
- Chris Pitman – keyboards, synthesizer, backing vocals, tambourine on "Welcome to the Jungle" and "The Seeker"
- Frank Ferrer – drums, tambourine on "Don't Cry"

=== Dancers ===
- Cassandra Sopher-Setili
- Angela Acosta
- Lisa Cannon
- Tara McClintic

=== Aerialists ===
- Alyssa McCraw
- Kelly Millaudon

=== Pole-dancers ===
- Ashleigh Park
- Ashley Mace

== Chart performance ==
Data from Ultratop.

Chart (2014)	Peak position
US Music Video Sales (Billboard)	1
French Music DVD (SNEP)ERROR in "FranceMV": Missing parameters: dvd, id.	79
Austrian Music DVD (Ö3 Austria)ERROR in "AustriaMV": Missing parameters: date.	57
Belgian Music DVD (Ultratop Wallonia)ERROR in "WalloniaMV": Missing parameters: date+year or artist+dvd or album+artist.	191
Finnish Music DVD (Suomen virallinen lista)ERROR in "FinlandMV": Missing parameters: album.	44
Spanish Music DVD (Promusicae)	93
