= Destrage =

Italian progressive metalcore band

- Origin: Milan, Italy
- Genres: Progressive metalcore, thrash metal (early)
- Years active: 2002–2024
- Labels: 3DOT Recordings, Metal Blade
- Members: Paolo Colavolpe; Matteo Di Gioia; Ralph Salati; Federico Paulovich
- Past members: Gabriel Pignata
- Website: www.destrage.com

Destrage were an Italian progressive metalcore band, formed in 2002. They have released six studio albums and were most recently signed to 3DOT Recordings after leaving their previous label, Metal Blade Records.

On 30 November 2023, the band announced they were breaking up in 2024 following four farewell shows in October celebrating their 2014 record Are You Kidding Me? No.. The final concert took place on 20 October 2024 at the Alactraz in the band's hometown of Milan.

== Band members ==
=== Final lineup ===
- Paolo Colavolpe – vocals (2002–2024)
- Matteo Di Gioia – guitar (2002–2024)
- Federico Paulovich – drums (2005–2024)
- Ralph Salati – guitar (2006–2024)
- Giuseppe Colli – bass (2023–2024)

=== Former members ===
- Marco Tafuri – guitar (2002–2005)
- Massimo Raineri – bass (2002–2005)
- Fabio Vignati – drums (2002–2005)
- Gabriel Pignata – bass (2005–2019)

== Discography ==
=== Studio albums ===
- Urban Being (2007)
- The King Is Fat'n'Old (2010)
- Are You Kidding Me? No. (2014)
- A Means to No End (2016)
- The Chosen One (2019)
- SO MUCH. too much. (2022)
