= Art of Anarchy =

American rock band

- Origin: United States
- Genres: Hard rock; alternative metal; post-grunge
- Years active: 2011–present
- Labels: Another Century; Pavement
- Members: Ron "Bumblefoot" Thal; Jon Votta; Vince Votta; Jeff Scott Soto; Tony Dickinson
- Past members: Scott Weiland; John Moyer; Scott Stapp
- Website: facebook.com/artofanarchyband

Art of Anarchy is an American rock supergroup formed in 2011, which currently consists of brothers Jon and Vince Votta on guitar and drums, Tony Dickinson on bass, Ron "Bumblefoot" Thal (ex-Guns N' Roses, ex-Asia, Sons of Apollo) on guitar and production, and Jeff Scott Soto (Sons of Apollo, ex-Talisman, ex-Journey) on lead vocals. The band's first album, Art of Anarchy (2015), featured the late vocalist Scott Weiland (ex-Stone Temple Pilots). The second album, The Madness (2017), featured vocalist Scott Stapp (Creed). In 2020, the band replaced Stapp with Soto and began production on the 2024 album, Let There Be Anarchy.

The band has been involved with legal battles against both Weiland and Stapp due to both vocalists' refusal to properly promote the band's music upon the release of their respective albums.

== History ==
=== Scott Weiland era: 2011–2015 ===
The band's origins came from a friendship between Bumblefoot and the Votta brothers that dates back many years. Jon Votta and Bumblefoot spoke about putting a band together. It was finally completed when John Moyer joined the band. The band name was created by Vince Votta.

The band started in 2011, with Bumblefoot recording parts for the debut album in between touring with Guns N' Roses. Weiland wrote and recorded the vocals after sharing the song files back and forth with Bumblefoot from 2012 to 2013. Weiland also took part in promotional photo shoots and music videos in October 2014.

Their self-titled debut album was tentatively scheduled for Spring 2015 and was released in June. On January 21, 2015 they released a 2:06 teaser of the new album. Bumblefoot is the producer and engineer on the album. The first single to be released from the album was "'Til The Dust Is Gone". The album contains 11 tracks. Weiland distanced himself from the project, stating: "I was never in the band. It was something I did when I wasn't doing anything. I was asked to write some lyrics and sing some melodies on this project, but it's not a band I'm in." Weiland went on to say that the band was a "scam" from the beginning saying they are an unsigned band without a lead singer. However, Thal countered by stating "The five of us made an album together. Scott is currently the singer of the band. It's in writing; (There's) no confusion". Despite the comments made by Thal, Weiland did not tour with the band in support of their new album.

In July 2015, bandmate Vince Votta sued Scott Weiland for refusing to help the band promote Art of Anarchy's debut album. Weiland also refused to take part in music videos after he agreed to write and perform the lyrics for the ten songs for the album. The Blast reports that Vince Votta claims to have paid Weiland $230,000 upfront for his work. The lawsuit filed by Vince Votta was to recover the $230,000 and asked for an additional $20 million in damages. Vince said the final straw for him was when Weiland called the band a scam. Scott Weiland counter-sued Vince accusing the company of unlawfully using his name and image to promote the band.

On December 3, 2015, Scott Weiland was found dead on his tour bus around 9PM, one day before he was to go on stage in Minnesota with his band The Wildabouts. On December 22, 2015, "In memory of Scott Weiland...", Art of Anarchy made their album available free online for their fans, and the legal matters between the two parties were dropped.

=== Scott Stapp era: 2016–2017 ===
On May 3, 2016, Creed singer Scott Stapp announced that he would replace Scott Weiland as the lead singer of Art of Anarchy.

In July 2016 at 2016 APMA, Scott Stapp said that he would debut with the group as their new singer in October of that same year and that a new album would be released in 2017. "It is a perfect mixture of all the bands each member has come from. So, it's like Disturbed meets Guns N' Roses, meets Creed."

The band's first single of their second studio album is called "The Madness" and their debut live performance with Scott Stapp as their vocalist took place at Gramercy Theatre in New York on October 27, 2016. The band's second album and first with Stapp as vocalist, also called The Madness, was released on March 24, 2017.

Art of Anarchy began touring in support of The Madness in April 2017. In February 2018, Art of Anarchy members Jon and Vincent Votta filed a lawsuit to the New York Supreme Court against lead vocalist Scott Stapp. The $1.2 million suit alleges that Stapp has failed to live up to his contract with the band, citing that he had not performed with the band in scheduled concerts and tours, along with missing photo shoots and promo videos and as other events to promote The Madness. The band claimed to have paid Stapp $200,000 upfront for his services. While Stapp's contract with the band did not prohibit him from going on solo tours, the band felt that, "If Stapp had dedicated himself to Art of Anarchy with the same fervor that he dedicated to his solo career, Art of Anarchy would have had a successful concert tour and its record contract would not have been terminated." Stapp has performed 80 solo shows compared to 18 with Art of Anarchy since The Madness was released.

=== Jeff Scott Soto era: 2020–present ===
On September 15, 2023 the band released a music video for a new single, "Vilified", featuring new vocalist Jeff Scott Soto for their upcoming third album. On February 5, 2024, the music video for the second single, "Die Hard," was released. The band's third album titled Let There Be Anarchy was released on February 16, 2024.

== Band members ==
Current

- Ron "Bumblefoot" Thal – guitar, backing vocals (2011–present)
- Jon Votta – guitar, backing vocals (2011–present)
- Vince Votta – drums, percussion (2011–present)
- Jeff Scott Soto – lead vocals (2020–present)
- Tony Dickinson – bass, backing vocals (2022–present)

Former

- Scott Weiland – lead vocals (2012–2015; his death)
- Scott Stapp – lead vocals (2016–2018)
- John Moyer – bass, backing vocals (2011–2022)

== Discography ==
=== Albums ===
- Art of Anarchy (2015)
- The Madness (2017)
- Let There Be Anarchy (2024)

=== Singles ===
List of singles, with selected chart positions, showing year released and album name
Title	Year	Peak chart positions	Album
Title	Year	US Main. Rock	Album
"Til the Dust Is Gone"	2015	—	Art of Anarchy
"Time Every Time"	2015	—	Art of Anarchy
"The Madness"	2016	26	The Madness
"Changed Man"	2017	—	The Madness
"Echo of a Scream"	2017	—	The Madness
"Vilified"	2023	—	Let There Be Anarchy
"Die Hard"	2024	—	Let There Be Anarchy

=== Music videos ===
List of music videos, showing year released and directors
Title	Year	Director
"Til the Dust Is Gone"	2015	Dale 'Rage' Resteghini
"Time Every Time"	2015	Dale 'Rage' Resteghini
"The Madness"	2016	Dan Catullo
"Echo of a Scream"	2017	Dale 'Rage' Resteghini
"Vilified"	2023	Dale 'Rage' Resteghini
"Die Hard"	2024	Dale 'Rage' Resteghini
