= Normal (Ron "Bumblefoot" Thal album) =

Studio album by Bumblefoot
- Released: December 2005
- Genres: Hard rock, heavy metal, grunge
- Length: 45:55
- Label: Bald Freak

Bumblefoot chronology
Forgotten Anthology (2003)	Normal (2005)	Abnormal (2008)

Normal is the sixth studio album by recording artist Ron "Bumblefoot" Thal released in December 2005.

Bumblefoot described the album as "Normal brings you into the world of an insane musician who takes medication and experiences what it's like to be 'normal' for the first time. The only problem is that the medicine silences his ability to make music. Eventually he must choose which life he wants. The songs on Normal follow his real-life journey, leaving you to ponder, "What's 'normal,' anyway?"

The songs "Real" and "Turn Around" are available as additional downloadable content in the video game, Rock Band 2 through the community-driven Rock Band Network. The song 'Thank You' is a 4:35 long song with 28 minutes of silence added in.

A music video for “Real" was directed by William Knight.

== Track listing ==
No.	Title	Length
1.	"Normal"	3:14
2.	"Real"	1:55
3.	"Turn Around"	4:14
4.	"Rockstar For A Day"	4:25
5.	"Overloaded"	3:28
6.	"Pretty Ugly"	2:07
7.	"The Color of Justice"	2:08
8.	"Breaking"	3:31
9.	"More"	3:27
10.	"Awake"	4:27
11.	"Life Inside Your Ass"	2:31
12.	"Shadow"	5:45
13.	"Thank You"	4:43
Total length:		45:55

== Personnel ==
- Ron Thal – vocals, guitars, bass
- Dennis Leeflang – drums
- 24-7 Spyz and SupaKDB – backing vocals
