= Sun Caged =

Dutch band

- Origin: Eindhoven, Netherlands
- Genres: Progressive metal
- Years active: 1999−2014
- Label: Lion Music
- Members: Paul Adrian Villarreal; Marcel Coenen; Rene Kroon; Daniel Kohn; Roel van Helden
- Past members: Dennis Leeflang; Rob van der Loo; Roel Vink; Sascha Burchardt; Joost van den Broek; Andre Vuurboom

Sun Caged was a progressive metal band originating in the Netherlands. Sun Caged was formed by ex-Aura and Lemur Voice guitarist Marcel Coenen and drummer Dennis Leeflang in the spring of 1999. Taking influences from artists in the metal genre such as Dream Theater and Iron Maiden, they have performed as support acts for bands such as Vanden Plas, Queensrÿche, Spock's Beard, and Fates Warning. Currently, the band has three albums, a self-titled studio album which was released on 22 October 2003, a second album, Artemisia, which was released on 23 March 2007 and the third album was released in 2011 and is called The Lotus Effect. All three albums received critical acclaim from the media.

The style stated by the band on their 2000 demo was rather experimental, with the use of female vocals, death growls, some melodic vocals with a touch of groove.

After the release of their debut album the line up of Sun Caged changed considerably. When the recordings of Artemisia had started, Coenen was the only band member left from the original line up. Leeflang left shortly after the release of the band's debut to pursue a musical career in New York and was replaced by Roel van Helden. After singer André Vuurboom left to form Sphere Of Souls he was replaced by the American Paul Adrian Villarreal. With the departure of Vuurboom keyboard player Joost van den Broek also parted ways with Sun Caged to join After Forever, a Dutch gothic metal outfit. René Kroon was hired as Van den Broek's substitute. Shortly before the Artemisia recording sessions bass player Rob van der Loo left as well. He went to join Dutch gothic metal band Delain and was replaced by Roel Vink.

The band's third studio album, The Lotus Effect, was released on 17 June 2011 through Lion Music. It was described as a balance between their eponymous debut and the more melodic second album, Artemisia.

In 2016, guitarist Marcel Coenen was cast as a guest guitarist in Ayreon's album The Source.

== Line-up ==
=== Last Line-up ===
- Marcel Coenen − lead guitar, rhythm guitar (since 1999)
- Rene Kroon − keyboards (since 2004)
- Paul Adrian Villarreal − vocals, acoustic guitar (since 2004)
- Daniel Kohn − bass (since 2009)
- Mick Gravee − drums, percussion (since 2012)

=== Previous members ===
- Dennis Leeflang − drums (1999-2003)
- Rob van der Loo − bass guitar (1999-2006)
- Sascha Burchardt − vocals (2000-2002)
- Joost van den Broek − keyboards (2000-2004)
- André Vuurboom − vocals (2002-2004)
- Roel van Helden - drums (2003-2012)
- Roel Vink − bass (2006-2009)

=== On a project basis ===
- Nick Hameury − vocals (1999)
- Gregoor van der Loo − vocals (1999)
- Thijs Cuppen − keyboards (1999)
- Laura van Driel − vocals (1999–2000)

== Discography ==
=== Studio albums ===
- Sun Caged (2003)
- Artemisia (2007)
- The Lotus Effect (2011)

=== Demos albums ===
- Scar Winter (2000)
- Dominion (2001)
- Promo 2002 (2002)
- Promo 2005 (2005)
