= Abnormal (Bumblefoot album) =

Studio album by Bumblefoot
- Released: July 2008
- Length: 52:10
- Label: Bald Freak

Bumblefoot chronology
Normal (2005)	Abnormal (2008)	Barefoot - the acoustic ep (2008)

Abnormal is the seventh studio album by recording artist Ron "Bumblefoot" Thal, released in July 2008. Abnormal is Thal's only solo release as a member of Guns N' Roses.

== Background ==
Thal described Abnormal as "..a continuation of a very personal tale. If Normal was the first chapter, then Abnormal is the second chapter of the same book. It's a tale of how my life has been 3 years after Normal, after touring with Guns N' Roses and [everything else]". The songs "Abnormal", "Glad to Be Here" and "Objectify" were performed by Thal as solo spots in Guns N' Roses concerts. "Objectify" was featured as Thal's solo in Appetite for Democracy 3D. After leaving Guns N' Roses, Thal revealed "Objectify" was written about his bandmates who initially treated him poorly, as they did not want a third guitarist in the band. Thal mentioned "Green" being one of his favorite songs he's ever written.

== Track listing ==
No.	Title	Length
1.	"Abnormal"	2:49
2.	"Glad to Be Here"	3:23
3.	"Objectify"	3:48
4.	"Some Other Guy"	2:53
5.	"Jenny B"	2:01
6.	"Last Time"	3:41
7.	"Simple Days"	4:12
8.	"Conspiracy"	1:20
9.	"Piranha"	3:20
10.	"Guitars Still Suck"	2:59
11.	"Green"	4:07
12.	"Spaghetti"	2:55
13.	"Misery"	2:30
14.	"Redeye"	3:35
15.	"The Day After"	3:13
16.	"Dash"	5:23
Total length:		52:10

== Personnel ==
- Ron "Bumblefoot" Thal - guitars, vocals
- Dennis Leeflang – drums
- Mike McVicker – tuba
- Swashbuckle, Dennis Leeflang, Brian Larkin, Natalie Kikkenborg, Erin Bailey – backing vocals
