= Thank You Scientist =

American progressive rock band

- Origin: Montclair, New Jersey, U.S.
- Genres: Progressive rock; progressive metal; jazz fusion
- Years active: 2009–present
- Label: Evil Ink
- Members: Tom Monda; Ben Karas; Joe Gullace; Alex Blade Silver; Kevin Grossman; Daimon Alexandrius; Sam Smith
- Past members: Salvatore Marrano; Faye Fadem; Sam Greenfield; James Robbins; Russ Lynch; Greg Colacino; George Marzloff; Ellis Jasenovic; Andrew Digrius; Odin Alvarez; Cody McCorry
- Website: thankyouscientist.com

Thank You Scientist is an American progressive rock band from Montclair, New Jersey. Their first EP, The Perils of Time Travel, was released in 2011, and their debut studio album, Maps of Non-Existent Places, releasing three years later, was named the "Revolver Album of the Week" in October 2014. Their second album, Stranger Heads Prevail, was released in July 2016. Their third album, Terraformer, was released in June 2019. In 2021, they released their second EP, Plague Accommodations.

== History ==
Thank You Scientist was initially formed as a solo bedroom project by guitarist, bandleader and primary composer Tom Monda.

In 2009, vocalist Salvatore Marrano (former vocalist of New Jersey rock band Hello Eden), bass player Greg Colacino, drummer Odin Alvarez, keyboardist George Marzloff, saxophonist Ellis Jasenovic and violin player Russ Lynch joined the band, which became the original lineup for Thank You Scientist. The band self-released their The Perils of Time Travel EP in 2011. Following the departure of George Marzloff, the band was joined by Andrew Digrius on trumpet. The band self released their second full length record Maps of Nonexistent Places in 2012. This album caught the attention of Claudio Sanchez, vocalist and guitarist for the progressive metal/rock group Coheed and Cambria and founder of Evil Ink Records, who brought the band to the label as its first signed act. A music video for "My Famed Disappearing Act" was released in August 2014. The digital re-release of the album was on September 16, 2014.

The deal opened multiple doors for the band, which soon started touring with Periphery in 2015, and with Coheed and Cambria later that year. Bass player Greg Colacino left the band that year, and was temporarily replaced by James Robbins and later by Cody McCorry of Karmic Juggernaut. Touring put new pressure on the band, which announced in September 2017 that Odin Alvarez, Ellis Jasenovic, and Andrew Digrius would leave the band, and were to be replaced by Faye Fadem on drums, Sam Greenfield on sax, and Joe Gullace on trumpet. In 2017 their song "Psychopomp" was included in Bluecoats Drum and Bugle Corps show "Jagged Line".

They announced their next album, Terraformer, on April 5, 2019, and released the first single off that album, "FXMLDR" (pronounced as “Fox Mulder” and inspired by the television series The X-Files), on April 13. The album was released June 14, 2019. The band also released a video for "FXMLDR" made with solar equipment and in conjunction with Bluecoats Drum and Bugle Corps.

Following a hiatus during the COVID-19 pandemic, Thank You Scientist returned to touring in fall 2021. In October the band played three sets on the Coheed and Cambria-headlined S.S. Neverender cruise, produced by Norwegian Cruise Line partner Sixthman. After the cruise, drummer Faye Fadem announced in a Facebook post on the band's official page that she was departing Thank You Scientist to focus on her music as Trust Fund Ozu, and that Kevin Grossman was taking over as drummer. A new EP, Plague Accommodations, was released on November 19, and the band embarked on a supporting 26-date tour of the U.S. and Canada.

In September 2023, the band announced on social media that the vocalist Salvatore Marrano was leaving the band to focus on his family responsibilities. All scheduled performances were canceled. In December 2024, it was announced that Daimon Alexandrius would be taking over on vocals. The band performed a small run of shows in May 2025 with support from Spilly Cave.

== Musical style ==
Their musical style has been described as progressive rock, progressive metal, and jazz fusion.

== Band members ==
Current

- Tom Monda – electric guitar, fretless guitar, shamisen, sitar, vocals, synth, producer (2009–present)
- Ben Karas – electric violin (2013–present)
- Joe Gullace – trumpet (2017–present)
- Alex Blade Silver – saxophone (2021–present)
- Kevin Grossman – drums, percussion (2021–present)
- Daimon Alexandrius – vocals (2024–present)
- Sam Smith – bass (2026–present)

Former

- Salvatore Marrano – vocals (2009–2023)
- Russ Lynch – violin, viola, mandolin (2009–2013)
- Ellis Jasenovic – saxophone (2009–2017)
- Andrew Digrius – trumpet, flugelhorn (2009–2017)
- George Marzloff – keyboards, synths (2009–2010)
- Greg Colacino – bass (2009–2015)
- Odin Alvarez – drums (2009–2017)
- James Robbins – bass (2015)
- Faye Fadem – drums (2017–2021)
- Sam Greenfield – saxophone (2017–2021)
- Cody McCorry – bass, theremin, saw (2015–2026)

Timeline

== Discography ==
=== Studio albums ===
Title	Album details	Peak chart positions				
Title	Album details	US	US Alt	US Heat	US Hard Rock	US Rock
Maps of Non-Existent Places	Released: June 8, 2012; Digital Re-release: September 16, 2014; Label: Evil Ink / Universal Music; Format: CD, digital download, vinyl	—	25	4	14	48
Stranger Heads Prevail	Released: July 29, 2016; Label: Evil Ink; Format: CD, digital download, vinyl	193	14	3	—	14
Terraformer	Released: June 14, 2019; Label: Evil Ink; Format: CD, digital download, vinyl	—	15	8	—	—

=== EPs ===
Title	EP details
The Perils of Time Travel	Released: January 10, 2011; Label: Self-released; Formats: Digital download
Plague Accommodations	Released: November 19, 2021; Label: Self-released; Formats: Digital download, vinyl

=== Singles ===
Title	Single details
"FXMLDR"	Released: April 12, 2019; Label: Evil Ink; Formats: Digital release
"Terraformer"	Released: May 9, 2019; Label: Evil Ink; Formats: Digital Release
"Swarm"	Released: June 6, 2019; Label: Evil Ink; Formats: Digital Release
"Party All the Time"	Released: November 12, 2019; Label: Evil Ink; Formats: Digital Release
