= Ron "Bumblefoot" Thal =

American guitarist (born 1969)

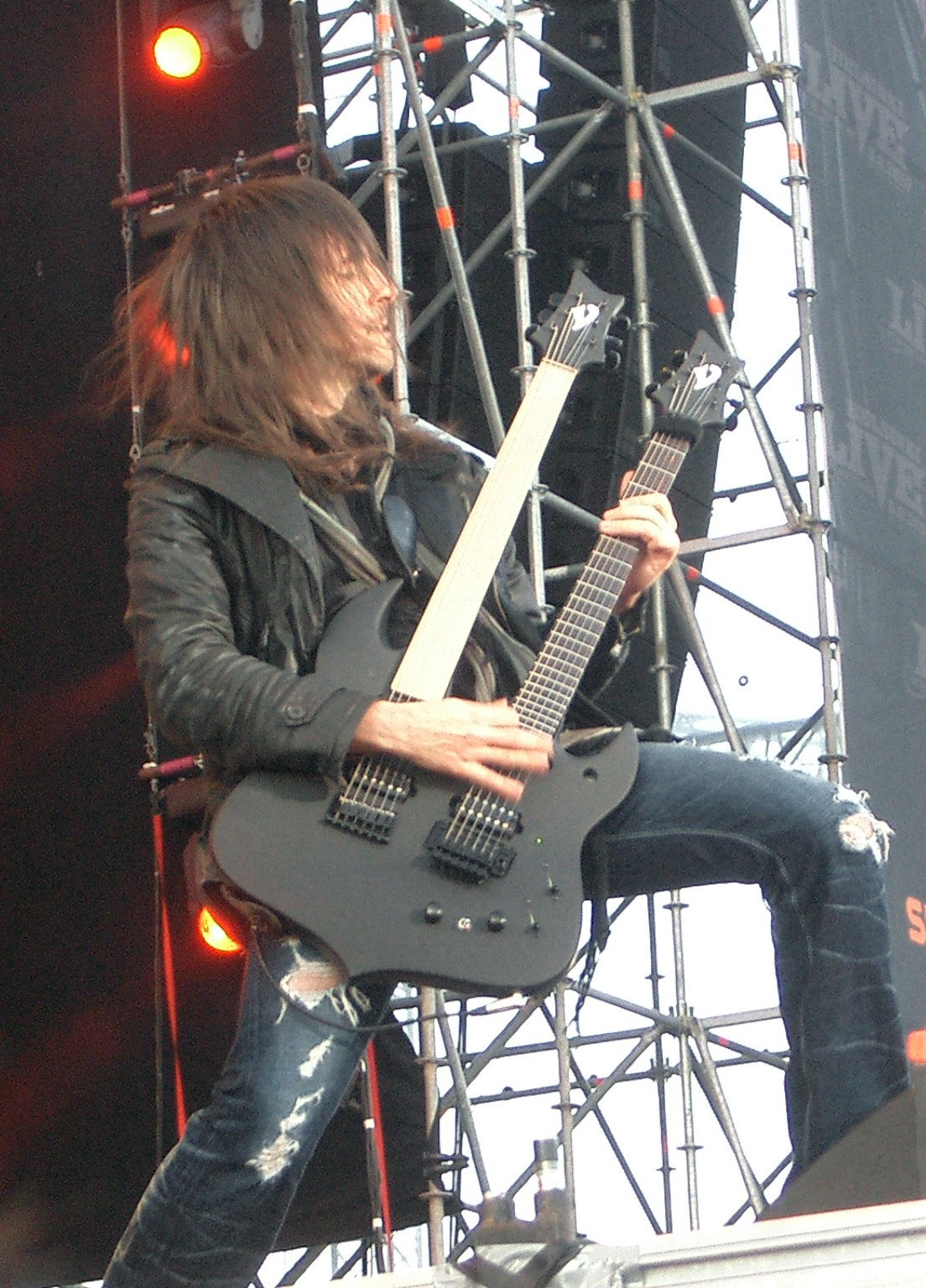
- Bumblefoot performing with Guns N' Roses in 2010

Background information
- Also known as: Bumblefoot, Ron Thal
- Born: Ronald Jay Blumenthal; September 25, 1969 (age 56); Brooklyn, New York City, U.S.
- Genres: Hard rock; heavy metal; grunge; alternative rock; avant garde music; progressive rock; film scores
- Occupations: Musician; songwriter; producer
- Instrument: Guitar
- Years active: 1982–present
- Labels: Bumblefoot Music; LLC
- Member of: Whom Gods Destroy; Art of Anarchy
- Formerly of: Sons of Apollo; Guns N' Roses; Asia
- Website: bumblefoot.com

Ronald Jay Blumenthal (born September 25, 1969), better known by his stage name Ron "Bumblefoot" Thal or simply Bumblefoot, is an American guitarist, songwriter, and producer. He adopted his nickname from the bacterial infection of the same name, which he learned about while helping his wife study for her veterinary exams. The name went from being just the name of an album, to the name of a record label, to a band name, to eventually his name as a solo artist. He was one of two lead guitarists in Guns N' Roses from 2006 until 2014 and performed on their sixth studio album Chinese Democracy. He was the guitarist for the supergroup Sons of Apollo and currently with supergroup Whom Gods Destroy; and served as the guitarist and vocalist for the band Asia from 2019 to 2022.

Since the early 1990s, Thal has released 10 solo albums and a live DVD. He has appeared as a guest performer on albums by other artists, and on numerous compilation albums. He has been the cover feature of GitarPlus magazine in Indonesia and has been featured in several foreign guitar magazines, as well as the subject of many print, radio and web interviews. Over the past twenty years, he has also worked with numerous bands and artists as producer, engineer, writer, arranger, and performer. He also writes TV jingles, theme songs, and background music.

== Career ==
=== Bumblefoot and solo career ===
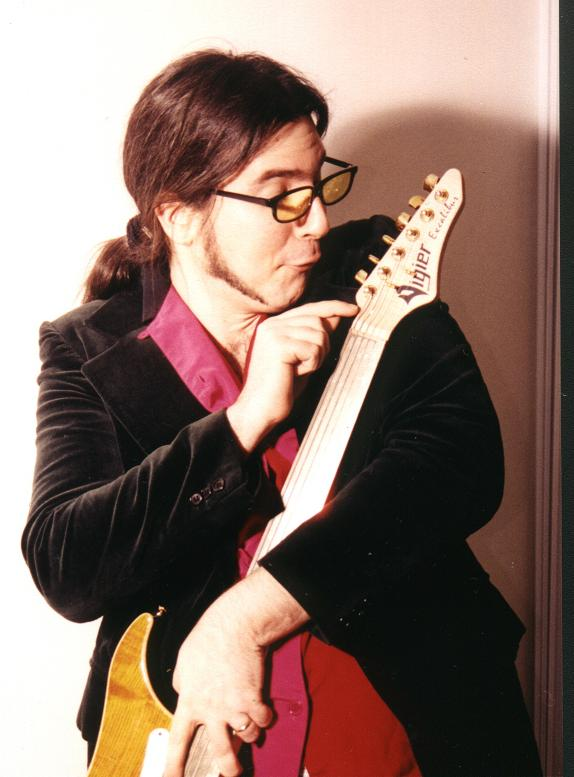
Thal in the late 90s

Raised Jewish, Thal grew up in Brooklyn and then Staten Island, in the Bay Terrace neighborhood. Thal was inspired by Kiss and their album Alive! at age six, Thal claimed his earliest musical goal was to be able to play "like Gene Simmons if someone decided to do a Kiss version of Beatlemania". At the time his hands were too small to play bass, so he focused on guitar, while his brother, Jeff, played drums instead. Thal stated that he figured out multi-track recording by using multiple cassette recorders at age six.

By the time Thal was thirteen years old, he was playing cover songs in clubs, later focusing on creating original material on his home 8-track. By sixteen, Thal had started engineering and producing music. When he was eighteen, Thal won his first award, winning a Sam Ash Guitar Solo Contest after playing a spontaneous solo. He played in a New York-based band called 'Legend' in the late 1980s. Thal also played in a cover band called Leonard Nimoy that played songs by Guns N' Roses, AC/DC, Kiss, and Aerosmith.

In 1989, Thal submitted a demo tape to Mike Varney of Shrapnel Records, which caused Varney to feature Thal in the Spotlight New Talent column in Guitar Player Magazine's August 1989 issue. Upon hearing the demo, Varney commented "[Thal's] demo tape is amongst the most impressive I've ever received. It contains elements of classical, blues, and jazz, and at times reminds me of Frank Zappa. His transcriptions are most impressive and detailed, so fans of hot transcriptions might be interested in seeing these musical masterpieces on paper. With its clever melodies, contrapuntal lines, intricate rhythms, and ultra-complex ensemble sections, Ron's sheer musicality will surely gain him much acclaim." In 1993, Guitar Network Magazine described Thal's playing as "Ridiculous... in a good way".

Thal was eventually signed to Shrapnel Records, and his debut album The Adventures of Bumblefoot was released in 1995. Thal released Hermit on Shrapnel in January 1997, his final album on the label. In late 1997, Thal started a production company called "Hermit, Inc.", then fully adopting the band name Bumblefoot while releasing Hands in March 1998. Bumblefoot was a band that featured Thal and his brother Jeff Thal, among other musicians. Bumblefoot released an early version of the album Uncool exclusively in France, touring in the country in March and April 2001. He then began working on his next album Guitars Suck, but after the September 11 attacks, Thal decided to rename the album 9.11 and turned the album into a non-profit fundraising CD, with all proceeds going to American Red Cross. In late 2001, amidst difficulties keeping a steady lineup, Thal broke up Bumblefoot and adopted it as a solo stage name. He worked on finishing Uncool, which was released in February 2002. Thal toured Europe as a solo act in 2002, using members from bands he was touring with, including Sun Caged & Plug-In. Sun Caged drummer Dennis Leeflang would later befriend Thal and work extensively with him in his solo career. Thal released a compilation of songs that weren't finished or officially released in April 2003, the Forgotten Anthology. Thal released Normal in 2005. Thal stated of the album "the album takes you into the world of an insane musician who takes medication and experiences what it's like to be 'normal' for the first time. The only problem is that the medicine silences his ability to make music. Eventually he must choose which life he wants. The songs on Normal follow his real-life journey, leaving you to ponder, "What's 'normal,' anyway?"

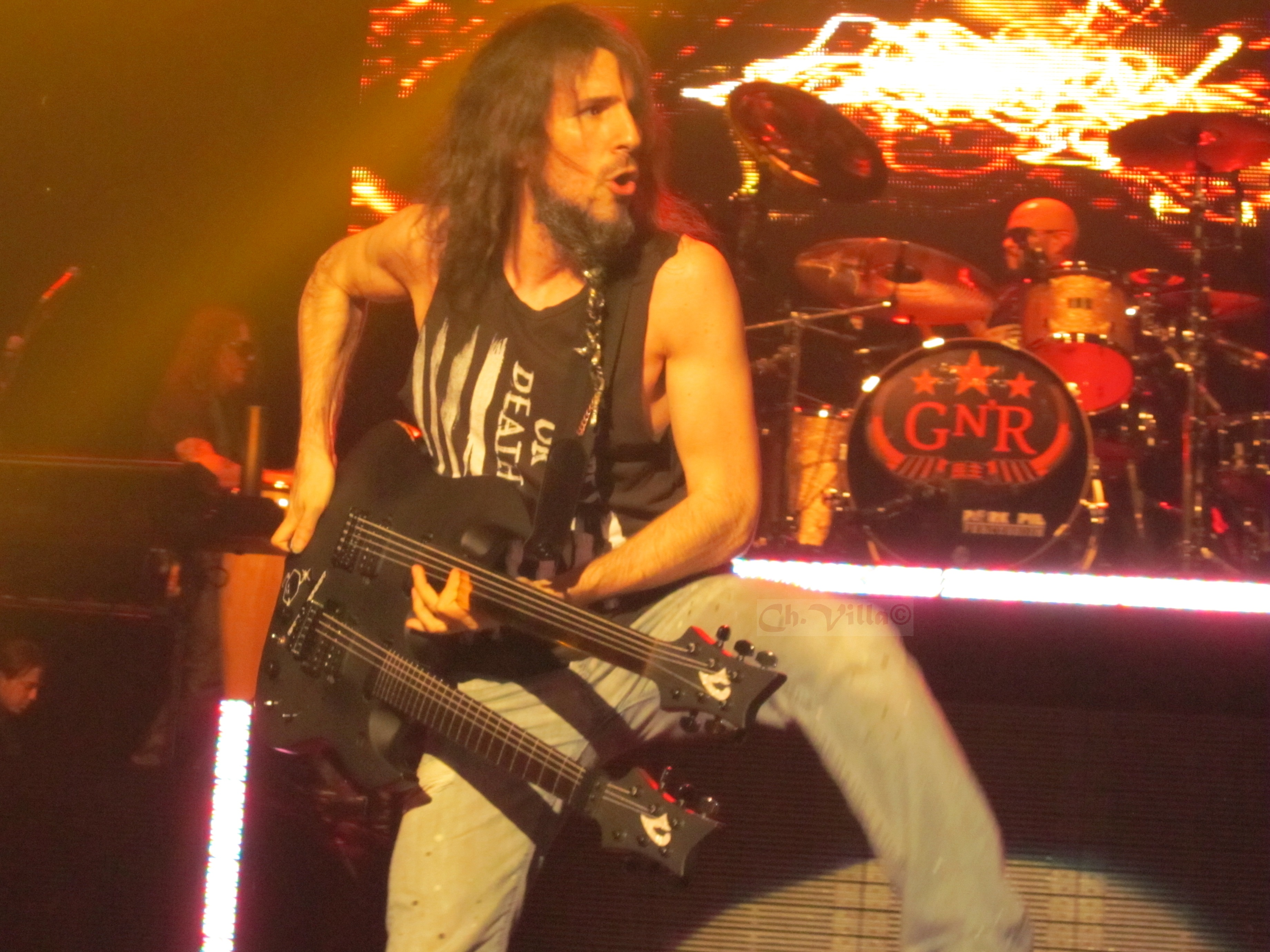
Thal performing with Guns N' Roses in 2013

In 2006, Thal's song "Breaking", from the album Normal, was contributed to the album project Artists for Charity – Guitarists 4 the Kids, a charity that assists World Vision Canada in helping underprivileged kids in need.

In 2007, after 14 months of recording and touring with Guns N' Roses, Thal began recording Abnormal, which was released in July 2008. During this time, Thal also recorded and mixed the audio of live performances on the TV show Talking Metal on Fuse. Thal performed a cover of "Running Wild" by Judas Priest along with Frank Ferrer on the pilot episode. He also performed on the final episode of the show, accompanying Zakk Wylde in an original song "Til the End", written live on the show. In December 2008 Thal released Barefoot – The Acoustic EP, which consists of stripped-down acoustic versions of songs from his previous albums.

Thal's song "Firebrand" was used as the opening theme for the TV show MXC (Most Extreme Elimination Challenge), the American adaptation of Takeshi's Castle. He has also co-written and performed the theme song to VH1 Classic's That Metal Show, an edit of his song "Day To Remember" on his Forgotten Anthology album. Thal has licensed several of his recordings to television shows on MTV and VH1 such as Hogan Knows Best, The Real World, Made, The Osbournes, and others. Thal also wrote and recorded the music for the New York Islanders Hockey Team 2008–2009 season promos.

In February 2009, Thal produced an all-instrumental metal guitar compilation CD entitled Guitars That Ate My Brain. He oversaw the writing, recording and mixing for half the album (co- writing, engineering and mixing as well as guitar and bass playing by Jeremy Krull, drums by Dennis Leeflang), contributed his playing to the song "Disengaged" and mastered the album. Other artists on the album include Devin Townsend, Chris Poland, Shane Gibson, Dave Martone, Paul Waggoner, and James Murphy.

In June 2009, Thal toured the U.S. and Europe playing guitar for Lita Ford for 14 shows.

Thal's 1995 debut album, The Adventures of Bumblefoot, after being out of print for years, was re-released in August 2010 as a 15 Year Anniversary Edition CD. Thal wrote a 200-page transcription book of the recording. In October 2010, Thal took time out while on tour with Guns N' Roses to give advice and perform with students of The Witchwood School Of Rock in Witney, UK along with Guns N' Roses drummer Frank Ferrer. During the event they played several classic Guns N' Roses tracks, including "Paradise City" and "Sweet Child O' Mine" with members of the tribute band Guns 2 Roses. On December 3, 2010, Thal made an appearance in Sydney as guest guitarist with the heavy metal band Fozzy.

His songs "Guitars Suck", "Real", "Turn Around", and "Dash" were made available in 2012 as additional downloadable content for the videogame Rock Band 3 through the community-driven Rock Band Network. He also composed for the Sega CD video game entitled Wild Woody.

From January 2011 through December 2011, Thal released a series of singles available as digital downloads, five covers and four original songs. Thal's first single was a cover of the 1967 Motown hit "Bernadette" by The Four Tops. His next single was another cover, this time The Beatles' "Strawberry Fields Forever". Thal released his third single, an original song called "Invisible" in March 2011. Thal claims that he wrote the music of the song in the mid 1990s, and finished adding lyrics in 2010. In April 2011, Thal released a cover of Elton John's "Goodbye Yellow Brick Road". Thal released another original song in May 2011 entitled "Father", a song dedicated to his father who had Alzheimer's disease.

Thal released his sixth single, an original song called "Cat Fight", in June 2011 featuring Mark Tornillo of the band Accept on vocals. In July 2011, Thal released a cover of the Herman's Hermits song "There's a Kind of Hush", his seventh single released in 2011. In September 2011, Thal released the eight single, an original song "Let Your Voice Be Heard". In December 2011, Thal released the ninth and final single in the series, a cover of "The Pink Panther Theme" by Henry Mancini.

On October 3, 2012, Thal appeared as a special guest at a concert for the Dubai-based rock band Point of View at the Hard Rock Cafe Dubai. In December 2013, Thal collaborated with online education site JamPlay.com to put together a series of lessons for aspiring guitarists.

Thal's most recent solo album Little Brother Is Watching was released on February 24, 2015. The first single, "Little Brother Is Watching" was debuted on Yahoo! Music on January 28, 2015. The album was composed, produced, recorded, mixed and mastered entirely by Bumblefoot himself in his in-home studio, and features Dennis Leeflang on drums.

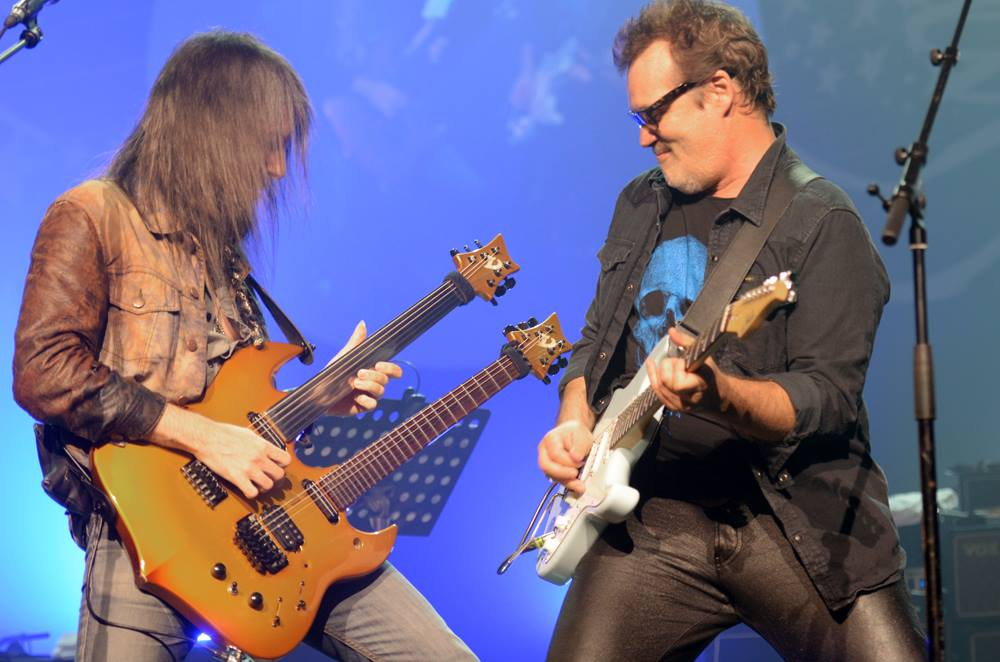
Bumblefoot and Axel Bauer in 2017

Thal is currently producing the upcoming album by DMC Generation Kill, a supergroup consisting of Darryl "D.M.C." McDaniels & members of the band Generation Kill.

Thal has acted in & scored the soundtrack for several independent horror films. He portrayed Thunder in The Meat Puppet in 2012, also contributing to the soundtrack. In 2013, Thal portrayed Mitch Casell in Gravedigger, as well as scoring the soundtrack. Thal scored the soundtrack and portrayed Jack Hayes in the Sony Pictures Home Entertainment thriller The Evangelist formerly Clean Cut and was released worldwide in May 2017

In recent years, Thal has been featured as a guest guitarist in both live performances and recordings with artists such as The Trip, The Midnight Preachers, T.T. Quick, Talas, Sin City Sinners, and Mick Blankenship.

=== Guns N' Roses (2006–2014) ===
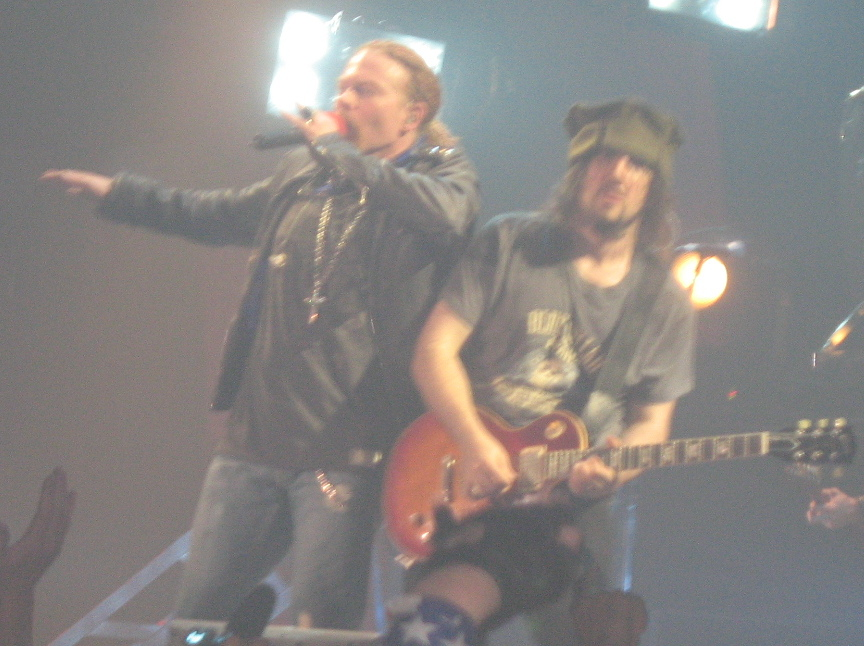
Bumblefoot and Guns N' Roses singer Axl Rose during a concert in 2006

In 2004, after a recommendation by guitar virtuoso Joe Satriani, Thal began talking to Guns N' Roses keyboardist Chris Pitman and sent in a tape of his music. Soon after, Thal claimed on his website he had been asked to join the band but later added "it's not definitely happenin', we're just feelin' it out". In response, Guns N' Roses released a statement saying "To set the record straight, no one has been invited to join the band". In a 2015 Interview, Thal claimed he initially turned down joining the band in 2004, citing commitments to part-time teaching and his solo work.

After first meeting the band and jamming with them in 2006, Thal officially joined, filling the position vacated by guitarist Buckethead. Thal made his live debut with the band at the Hammerstein Ballroom in New York City on May 12, 2006 and he also performs on the band's sixth studio album Chinese Democracy, released in 2008. Thal appeared on the Guns N' Roses video release Appetite for Democracy 3D, including a solo spot of his song "Objectify" from Abnormal. Thal has performed solo songs such as "Objectify", "Abnormal", "Glad to Be Here", and a cover of The Pink Panther Theme during Guns N' Roses concerts.

In November 2008, Thal hosted the official listening party for the recently released album Chinese Democracy in New York City. In December 2009, Thal began touring with Guns N' Roses on the Chinese Democracy World Tour. Thal also appeared in the subsequent Up Close and Personal Tour and the Appetite for Democracy tour.

In a 2013 interview, Thal mentioned that when he first joined the band, he was not welcomed by other members who didn't want a third guitarist in the band. He claimed that he had to "get a little violent" to gain other member's respect. Thal later clarified on his first months in the band, stating in a 2015 interview "it wasn't the warmest welcome. I kind of had to earn it. I think it was just more of a situation like a new family member was brought home without the other siblings' consent." In late 2014, Thal announced that he was 'focusing on his solo career'. In an interview promoting his solo album, when asked about Guns N' Roses, he said he was "avoiding the whole subject [right now]". In February 2015, Thal stated that he was "honoring a request to not make any public statements" about his status with Guns N' Roses. Thal explained further with, "Let folks know I'm not being forced ... It's on me, I've been trying to please both sides at the same time that have a different approach to things, and everyone loses a little in the process — that's on me, not them [Guns N' Roses management]."

On July 31, 2015, journalist Gary Graff reported that a 'confirmed source within the band' told him Thal was no longer in Guns N' Roses and had left after the 2014 tour, although no official announcement from Thal or the band was made at the time. Thal discussed leaving the band for the first time in a July 2016 interview, stating "All I could say is you reach a time when you just know it's time to move on".

=== Art of Anarchy, Sons of Apollo, Asia, and Whom Gods Destroy (2011–present) ===
In 2011, Thal formed a band with John Moyer of Disturbed, Jon Votta & Vince Votta called Art of Anarchy. The band was formally revealed in January 2015 with an album set for Spring 2015. Scott Weiland provided vocals for the debut album, but later distanced himself from the project, stating he was 'never in the band'. Weiland claimed "I [just] sang over these stereo tracks and then sent [them] back." Former Creed singer Scott Stapp joined the band as lead singer in 2016. The second studio album, titled The Madness was released March 24, 2017.

In August 2017, he joined a progressive metal supergroup named Sons of Apollo with bassist Billy Sheehan, keyboardist Derek Sherinian, vocalist Jeff Scott Soto and drummer Mike Portnoy. In 2018, they have released their debut album, entitled Psychotic Symphony. January 17, 2020 the second album MMXX was released.

On 2 April 2019, it was announced that Thal had joined Asia as lead vocalist and guitarist and that he would debut as part of the band's touring lineup in tribute to John Wetton during "The Royal Affair Tour". In 2022, Thal announced that he wouldn't be able to be a part of the 2022 Asia tour, since it conflicted with a rescheduled Sons of Apollo tour. In his place, Asia announced that they would be touring with Marc Bonilla as their guitarist and vocalist. Thal also confirmed this on his Instagram, where he stated that he would be unable to join Asia's tour because of the conflict of dates, but also that he would be there as long as his Asia bandmates want him to be there.

In December 2023, keyboardist Derek Sherinian and guitarist Ron "Bumblefoot" Thal unveiled a new progressive metal project named "Whom Gods Destroy". They announced recruitment of Dino Jelusick on vocal duties, along with Yas Nomura on bass, and Bruno Valverde as their drummer. Recording has completed for their upcoming debut album, "Insanium". It is expected to release March 2024.

== Personal life ==
Thal is Jewish. He married his wife, a veterinarian named Jennifer, on May 4, 1996. Thal's father, who suffered from Alzheimer's disease, died on December 3, 2013.

Thal is involved with multiple charities, including being on the board of directors of the MS Research Foundation, a non-profit organization that raises money for multiple sclerosis research. Thal has also teamed up with CaJohns Fiery Foods to release a brand of hot sauces, with proceeds going to women's health organizations. Other charities Thal is involved with include the Wildlife Trust of India and Operation Smile.

In 1993, to supplement his income, Thal taught photography and music part-time at schools. In 2002, Thal was a part-time adjunct professor at SUNY Purchase College, teaching music production until 2004.

In 2005, Thal started working out after he noticed his health was deteriorating from overworking, losing 80 lbs (36 kg). In June 2011, Thal was involved in a car accident that totaled his car. Thal suffered severe injuries, stating in a 2012 interview "I was brain damaged for about a month, I couldn't speak right, I couldn't raise my arms. I went to physical therapy" and that "I'm not recovering, and I probably never will." In constant pain from his injuries, Thal had to combine over-the-counter drugs and pain killers with alcohol and steroids in order to tour. In late 2011, Thal chose to tour instead of take time off to heal in order "keep Guns N' Roses alive", later stating the decision resulted in him having nerve damage in both arms in addition to chronic pain 'for the rest of [his] life'. In a 2013 interview, Thal mentioned attempting suicide by drinking himself to death while on tour in 2011, stating "when you torture yourself for a year—post traumatic stress is a real thing, and to have been completely disassociated and becoming very reckless and destructive—getting past that was a really tough time". Thal changed his diet in order to cope with the chronic pain, stating "Food did what medicine couldn't. And I realized that food is the best medicine. When you eat the right things for your body, it'll make more of a difference than any medication could ever do."

Thal revealed in late 2014 that he had a cancerous tumor that was found and surgically removed in January 2014.

Thal lists his favorite musical artists as Rush, Kiss, Aerosmith, The Beatles, Queen, Led Zeppelin, Stevie Wonder, Four Tops, Engelbert Humperdinck, Nirvana, Tom Jones, Frédéric Chopin, Pyotr Ilyich Tchaikovsky, Iron Maiden, Busta Rhymes, Thank You Scientist and Tom Jobim, along with the genre of lounge music. Thal also noted Bowie, Iron Maiden, Stevie Wonder, Guns N' Roses, George Harrison and Manowar as influences on his solo material.

== Guitars ==
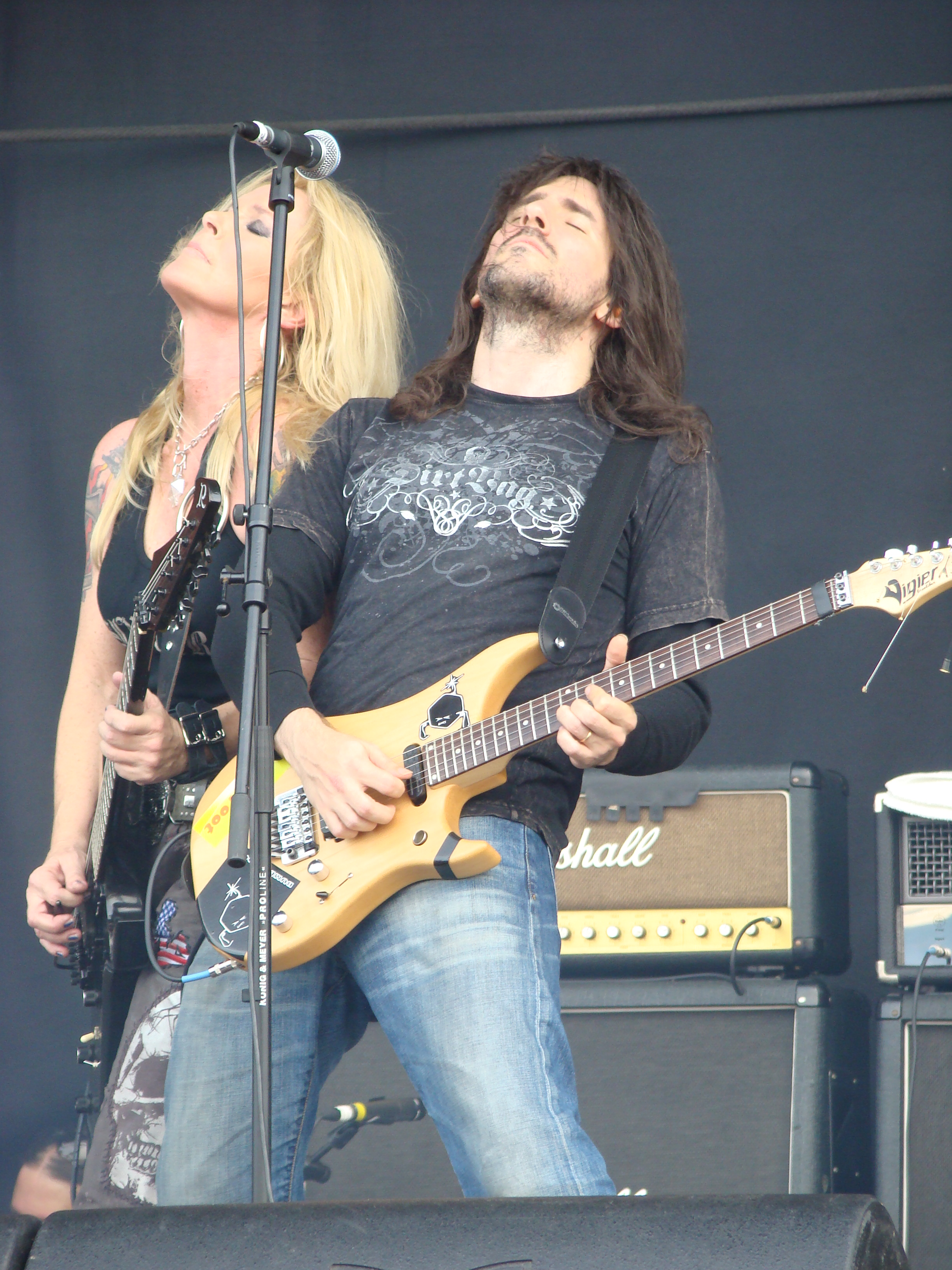
Bumblefoot playing with Lita Ford in 2009

Thal is an endorser of Vigier Guitars and Cort Guitars. Vigier produces a signature Excalibur model for Thal named "Bfoot" and a custom shaped double neck with a fretless neck on top and a fretted neck on the bottom called the "DoubleBFoot"

- Excalibur Custom Clear Black
- Excalibur Surfreter Supra Antique Violin
- DoubleBfoot (Double neck, fretted/fretless)
- Vigier Cheese Guitar
- Excalibur Bfoot Edition
- Cort Acoustic Guitars

== Discography ==
- The Adventures of Bumblefoot (1995)
- Hermit (1997)
- Hands (1998)
- 9.11 (2001)
- Uncool (2002)
- Normal (2005)
- Abnormal (2008)
- Little Brother Is Watching (2015)
- Bumblefoot ...Returns! (2025)
