= Banu (name) =

- Pronunciation: bânu, bano
- Gender: Female
- Language: Persian

Origin
- Meaning: "grand lady, princess, queen"

Banu (Persian: بانو, romanized: bânu), alternatively spelled Bano, is a Persian name for girls popular in Iran and other Persian-speaking countries. It is also used in Turkey, Pakistan, Bangladesh, Azerbaijan, India and Sri Lanka. It means "lady" in Persian, and also "grand lady", "princess" or "queen".

A very different word, "Bhanu", meaning "Sun" in Sanskrit. The word is often simplified to "Banu" in certain pronunciations of the word in several Indian languages, notably in Tamil and Telugu.

Notable people with the name Banu include the following:

== Given name ==
- Nurbanu Sultan (1525–1583), wife of Ottoman sultan Selim II
- Banu Alkan (born 1958), Turkish-Croatian actress
- Banu Avar (born 1955), Turkish author, journalist, news anchor, and political commentator
- Banu Bargu, professor of History of Consciousness and Political Theory at the University of California, Santa Cruz
- Banu Kırbağ (1951–2025), Turkish pop music artist
- Aram Banu Begum (1584–1624), Mughal princess, the youngest daughter of Emperor Akbar from his wife Bibi Daulat Shad
- Arjumand Banu Begum (1593–1631), Mughal empress, the chief consort of Emperor Shah Jahan
- Bahar Banu Begum (1590–1653), (meaning "The Blooming Lady"), Mughal princess, the daughter of Emperor Jahangir
- Bakshi Banu Begum (1540–1596), Mughal princess, the second daughter of Emperor Humayun from his wife Gunwar Bibi
- Dilras Banu Begum (1622–1657), the first wife and chief consort of Mughal Emperor Aurangzeb
- Hamida Banu Begum (1527–1604), wife of the second Mughal emperor Humayun and the mother of his successor
- Hoshmand Banu Begum (1605–??), (meaning "The Prudent Lady"), Mughal princess, the daughter of Prince Khusrau Mirza
- Ibn Banu, nominal governor of al-Bahrain for the Abbasid dynasty, serving there in 903
- Jahanzeb Banu Begum (died 1705), Mughal princess and the chief consort of Muhammad Azam Shah
- Nadira Banu Begum (1618–1659), Mughal princess and the wife of Crown Prince Dara Shukoh
- Nur Banu Özpak (born 1996), Turkish sport shooter
- Parhez Banu Begum (1611–1675), Mughal princess, the first child and eldest daughter of Emperor Shah Jahan from his first wife
- Rahmat Banu Begum (1656–1684), the first wife of titular emperor Muhammad Azam Shah
- Sakina Banu Begum (died 1604), Mughal princess, the daughter of Emperor Humayun
- Saliha Banu Begum (died 1620), Empress consort of the Mughal Empire as the wife of Emperor Jahangir
- Shahar Banu Begum (1663–??), Empress consort of the Mughal Empire as the third (and last) wife of Emperor Muhammad Azam Shah
- Banu Cennetoğlu (born 1970), visual artist based in Istanbul
- Banu Güven (born 1969), Turkish journalist
- Husna Banu Khanam (1922–2006), Bangladeshi educationist, writer and Nazrul singer
- Banu Onaral (1949–2024), Professor of Biomedical Engineering and Electrical Engineering at Drexel University, Philadelphia, Pennsylvania
- Raihan Akhter Banu Roni (1952–2024), ex Member of Parliament of Bangladesh, leader of Bangladesh Nationalist Party (BNP)
- Hamida Banu Shova (born 1954), the founder and chairperson of Queens University, Bangladesh
- Banu Subramaniam (born 1966), professor of women, gender and sexuality studies at the University of Massachusetts Amherst
- Meriç Banu Yenal (born 1988), Turkish female basketball player
- Banu Chichek, character in the Book of Dede Korkut

== Surname ==
- Constantin Banu (1873–1940), Romanian writer, journalist, Arts and Religious Affairs Minister in 1922–1923
- Farhat Banu (died 1977), member of the Dhaka Nawab family and member of the Bengal Legislative Assembly in British India
- Florentin Banu, businessman from Timișoara, Romania
- Gheorghe Banu (1889–1957), Romanian hygienist, Health Minister in the Octavian Goga government from December 1937 to March 1938
- Grace Banu, Dalit and transgender activist
- Gulzar Banu (born 1963), Indian politician and former Mayor of the Mangalore City Corporation
- Hamida Banu (1959/60–2024), Indian athlete
- Iksaka Banu (born 1964), Indonesian writer of comics and prose
- Leila Arjumand Banu (1929–1995), Bangladeshi singer and social activist
- Naseem Banu (1916–2002), Indian film actress
- Rahima Banu (born 1972), the last known person to have been infected with naturally occurring Variola major smallpox
- Saira Banu (born 1943), Indian film actress and the wife of the film actor Dilip Kumar
- Sayeda Motahera Banu, Bangladeshi writer and winner of the Independence Award in 2001, the highest civilian award in Bangladesh
- Selina Banu (1926–1983), Bangladeshi politician, social activist, and feminist

== See also ==
- Bano (disambiguation)
- Banu (disambiguation)
- Bangu (disambiguation)
- Begum
- Khatun
- Shahbanu
