= Benow =

Benow or Bonu (Persian: بنو) may refer:

== Places in Iran ==
- Benow, Lamerd, Fars Province
- Benow, Larestan, Fars Province
- Banu, Khamir, Hormozgan Province
- Bonu, Sistan and Baluchestan

== Other uses ==
- Benow (company), South Korean cosmetics company

== See also ==
- Banu (disambiguation)
- Benu (disambiguation)
