= Banu =

Banu or BANU may refer to:

- Banu (name)
- Banu (Arabic), Arabic word for "the sons of" or "children of"
- Banu (makeup artist), an Indian makeup artist
- Banu Chichek, a character in the Book of Dede Korkut
- Bulgarian Agrarian National Union, a political party

== Places ==
- Banu, Iran (disambiguation), various places in Iran
- Bannu or Banū City, in Khyber-Pakhtunkhwa, Pakistan
- Banu, a village in the commune of Dumești, Iași, Romania
- Banú, a village in County Wexford, Ireland

== See also ==
- Bano (disambiguation)
- Bangu (disambiguation)
- Banhu, Chinese musical instrument
- Bannu (disambiguation)
- Banou, Burkina Faso
- Bhanu (disambiguation)
- Bianhu
- Bonu (disambiguation)
