= Shangri-La Dee Da =

Studio album by Stone Temple Pilots
- Released: June 19, 2001
- Recorded: January–April 2001
- Studios: The Malibu House; Malibu
- Genres: Grunge; alternative rock; psychedelic rock
- Length: 47:25
- Label: Atlantic
- Producer: Brendan O'Brien

Stone Temple Pilots chronology
| № 4 (1999) | Shangri-La Dee Da (2001) | Thank You (2003) |

Singles from Shangri-La Dee Da
- 1. "Days of the Week" Released: June 5, 2001; 2. "Hollywood Bitch" Released: September 3, 2001

Shangri-La Dee Da is the fifth studio album by the American rock band Stone Temple Pilots. It was released on June 19, 2001, through Atlantic Records. Recording took place between January and April 2001 in a Malibu villa. It was the band's fifth and final album to be produced by Brendan O'Brien and their last before breaking up in 2003.

Originally planned to be a double album, Shangri-La Dee Da contains thirteen tracks which range from heavy, distorted songs to psychedelic-inspired rock and acoustic ballads. "Days of the Week" and "Hollywood Bitch" were released as singles, with the former becoming a rock radio hit.

While Shangri-La Dee Da was not as commercially successful as its predecessors, it still sold well, reaching the top ten in the US and the top five in Canada and being certified Gold in both countries. The album received positive reviews from critics, with many praising the variety of moods across the album. The band toured throughout the rest of 2001 to promote the album, including embarking on the Family Values Tour with Linkin Park and others in October and November of that year.

== Background ==
Shangri-La Dee Da was originally conceived as a double album dedicated to the memory of Andrew Wood. Around the time of the album's release, vocalist Scott Weiland stated his belief that creating a double album would have been a way to "free ourselves from the habits we got into of making records in the past", adding that not having preconceived ideas about the outcome of the record would have allowed the band to "approach everything equally — not just the rock stuff, not just because the producer or the label or management think it's a hit." According to Weiland, approximately 30 songs had been recorded for the album. Bassist Robert DeLeo was optimistic about the project, stating at the time: "Scott's in a space right now where we're not cramming to just get a single record done — he's in a space where I think a double record is possible." However, Atlantic and O'Brien were hesitant about the idea, and the project was reduced to a single album.

=== Planned documentary and coffee table book ===
Rock photographer Chapman Baehler filmed a behind-the-scenes documentary as the band recorded the LP in their beach villa-turned-recording studio. According to Baehler, the documentary set out to be like a modern-day version of the 1970 Beatles documentary Let It Be. The film would have followed the band through preproduction and creating new songs to putting those songs down on tape. Baehler explained that the documentary included "beautiful" and "moody" shots and clips including "either Dean [DeLeo] or Robert" playing an old organ, Weiland and Dean playing acoustic guitars, and "rock-out live stuff" in the main recording area.

Already an established photographer who had collaborated with the band for years, Baehler was in the midst of working with the band on a coffee-table book when they approached him with the documentary idea. The film and book were both planned to come out in late 2001, but neither saw release.

== Recording ==
To record the album, the band rented a mansion in Malibu, California (credited as "The Malibu House" in the album's liner notes) in which they, along with O'Brien, his staff, the band member's wives/partners, and the documentary crew lived for the duration of the process. While the cramped atmosphere sometimes facilitated confrontations, Weiland would look back on the experience as "an interesting experiment" with both ups and downs. However, drummer Eric Kretz called the period "the happiest five weeks of my life", saying the relationship between band members was "at its highest point in six years".

== Music and lyrics ==
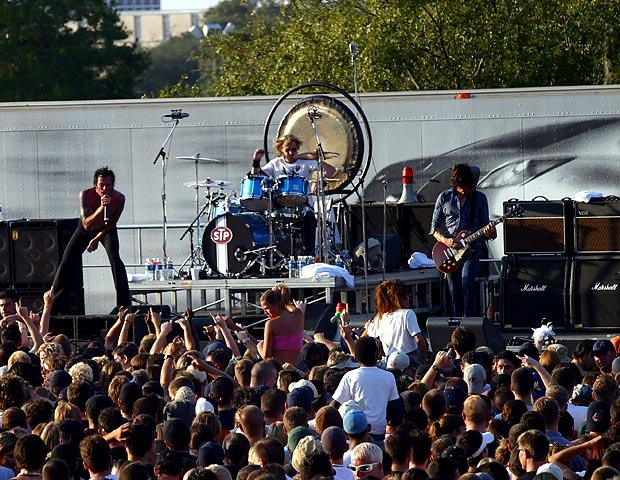
STP playing in Tampa, Florida in 2002 in support of Shangri-La Dee Da. From left to right: Scott Weiland, Eric Kretz, and Dean DeLeo.

Much of Shangri-La Dee Da alternates between hard rock and psychedelia-inspired pop rock. In the liner notes, Weiland's wife and newborn son were credited as inspirations for a large portion of the album's songs. Additionally, much of the material on the album revolves around what he called "the evil inertia" of substance abuse. "Dumb Love", one of the album's heaviest tracks musically, was interpreted by some critics as being one of these tracks lyrically revolving around Weiland's struggles with addiction. "Days of the Week" is a more pop-oriented track which, according to Weiland, took a "Beatles–style approach" to its lyrics and melody. Dean also credited Joe Walsh's "Indian Summer" as an inspiration on the track. Weiland described the song's subject as an "assessment of my feelings coming straight out of jail and being hit with sensory overload and a lot of new insecurities." While he would later state he felt the band "probably shouldn't" have chosen the track to be the album's lead single, Weiland did name it as one of his ten favorite tracks from his career. The industrial–tinged "Coma" features processing applied to Weiland's vocals which PopMatters described as "imitating a scratchy guitar". "Wonderful" was written by Robert and Weiland in a dressing room while on tour. Weiland initially wanted the song to go in "a Nick Drake kind of direction", until going through multiple different arrangements and creating the finalized song. Written as a love song to his wife, Weiland once called it his favorite ballad the band has made. "Black Again" was written as a waltz, being played in 3/4.

"Too Cool Queenie" tells a narrative of "a vindictive siren who prompts her musician-husband's suicide" which is widely thought to have been written about Courtney Love. Described as a "day-in-the-life song", "Bi-Polar Bear" references Weiland's struggles with bipolar disorder. In a June 2001 interview with VH1, he described its lyrics as a "snapshot" of a manic or depressive episode. The song sees the band experiment with unusual instrumentation, with Robert playing autoharp and Kretz contributing banjo. "A Song for Sleeping" is an acoustic ballad which was written about Weiland's newfound fatherhood. The closing track "Long Way Home" sees Weiland return to the lower, "guttural growling" vocal style of the band's early work.

== Release and reception ==
=== Commercial performance ===
Shangri-La Dee Da became the band's fifth top ten album, peaking at number nine on the Billboard 200. However, it would remain their lowest-charting album until Stone Temple Pilots (2018) and was their first to fail to go Platinum. The album's highest chart placement was in Canada, where it peaked at number five.

"Days of the Week", the album's first single, peaked at number four on the Mainstream Rock chart, number five on the Alternative Airplay (then named "Modern Rock Tracks") chart, and number one on the Bubbling Under Hot 100 chart. The second single, "Hollywood Bitch", was not as successful, but did manage to reach numbers 25 and 29 on the Mainstream Rock and Modern Rock Tracks charts, respectively.

=== Critical reception ===
Professional ratings
Aggregate scores
| Source | Rating |
|---|---|
| Metacritic | 72/100 |
Review scores
| Source | Rating |
| AllMusic | 3/5 stars |
| Encyclopedia of Popular Music | 3/5 stars |
| Entertainment Weekly | C+ |
| Kerrang! | 2/5 stars |
| Mojo | 3.5/5 stars |
| NME | 6/10 |
| PopMatters | 8/10 |
| Q | 4/5 stars |
| Rolling Stone | 3.5/5 stars |
| The Rolling Stone Album Guide | 2.5/5 stars |

Shangri-La Dee Da received generally positive reviews from critics. PopMatters stated that the album "displays an earnestness and a level of comfort not heard on previous albums". The review highlighted the band's fusions of different styles, referring to the album as a "complex and genre-bending joyride". Writing for Rolling Stone, Greg Kot praised the album's lyrical themes and opined that "they give the album a weight and coherence lacking on previous STP releases." Launch.com called it "another bombshell of an album", praising its "majestic" melodies, "muscular pop-metal" style, and the darker content of Weiland's lyrics.

In a retrospective review for AllMusic, Stephen Thomas Erlewine believed that while some of the harder rock tracks on the album (namely "Dumb Love" and "Hollywood Bitch") "do take hold", the highlights of the album are the poppier tracks, saying that "they're not just better on the pop tunes, they're phenomenal on the pop tunes." Ultimate Guitar placed the album at number five in their list of the "Top 10 Grunge Albums That Survived the '00s", praising the album's psychedelic elements and adventurous nature.

== Track listing ==
All lyrics are written by Scott Weiland, except "Hollywood Bitch" by Weiland and Robert DeLeo.

Shangri-La Dee Da track listing
| No. | Title | Music | Length |
|---|---|---|---|
| 1. | "Dumb Love" | Dean DeLeo, Weiland | 2:52 |
| 2. | "Days of the Week" | D. DeLeo | 2:35 |
| 3. | "Coma" | R. DeLeo; D. DeLeo; Weiland | 3:41 |
| 4. | "Hollywood Bitch" | R. DeLeo | 2:44 |
| 5. | "Wonderful" | R. DeLeo | 3:47 |
| 6. | "Black Again" | D. DeLeo; R. DeLeo | 3:27 |
| 7. | "Hello It's Late" | R. DeLeo | 4:22 |
| 8. | "Too Cool Queenie" | D. DeLeo | 2:47 |
| 9. | "Regeneration" | D. DeLeo | 3:55 |
| 10. | "Bi-Polar Bear" | D. DeLeo | 5:04 |
| 11. | "Transmissions from a Lonely Room" | R. DeLeo | 3:15 |
| 12. | "A Song for Sleeping" | R. DeLeo | 4:15 |
| 13. | "Long Way Home" | D. DeLeo | 4:33 |
| Total length: | | | 47:25 |

== Personnel ==
All credits for Shangri-La Dee Da are adapted from the album's liner notes.

Stone Temple Pilots

- Scott Weiland – lead vocals; keyboards (2, 8, 9)
- Robert DeLeo – bass, backing vocals; percussion (4, 5, 7); guitar intro (4); acoustic guitar (5, 7, 12); additional electric guitar, keyboards (5); piano (6); autoharp (10); electric sitar (11)
- Dean DeLeo – guitar
- Eric Kretz – drums; percussion (4, 9, 10, 12); keyboards (5); banjo (10)

=== Additional personnel ===
- Brendan O'Brien – production, mixing; keyboards (2, 6, 7, 10); percussion (2, 4, 8, 11)
- Nick DiDia – recording engineer
- Doug Grean – additional engineering
- Billy Bowers – additional engineering
- Karl Egsieker – assistant recording engineer, assistant mixing engineer
- Ryan Williams – assistant mixing engineer
- Bob Ludwig – mastering
- Erin Haley – production coordination
- Cheryl Mondello – production coordination
- Gregory Sylvester – art direction
- Chapman Baehler – art direction, photography

== Charts and certifications ==
=== Weekly charts ===
Weekly charts for Shangri-La Dee Da
| Chart (2001) | Peak Position |
|---|---|
| Australian Albums (ARIA) | 35 |
| Canadian Albums (Billboard) | 5 |
| German Albums (Offizielle Top 100) | 72 |
| Scottish Albums (Official Charts) | 99 |
| UK Albums (OCC) | 105 |
| UK Rock & Metal Albums (Official Charts) | 13 |
| US Billboard 200 | 9 |

| Chart (2024) | Peak position |
|---|---|
| Hungarian Physical Albums (MAHASZ) | 29 |

=== Year-end charts ===
Year-end chart performance for Shangri-La Dee Da
| Chart (2001) | Position |
|---|---|
| Canadian Albums (Nielsen SoundScan) | 191 |

=== Singles ===
Singles - Billboard (North America)

| Year | Single | Chart | Position |
|---|---|---|---|
| 2001 | "Days of the Week" | US Mainstream Rock (Billboard) | 4 |
| 2001 | "Days of the Week" | US Modern Rock Tracks (Billboard) | 5 |
| 2001 | "Days of the Week" | US Bubbling Under Hot 100 (Billboard) | 1 |
| 2001 | "Hollywood Bitch" | US Mainstream Rock (Billboard) | 25 |
| 2001 | "Hollywood Bitch" | US Modern Rock Tracks (Billboard) | 29 |

=== Certifications ===
| Region | Certification | Certified units/sales |
|---|---|---|
| Canada (Music Canada) | Gold | 50,000^{^} |
| United States (RIAA) | Gold | 500,000^{^} |
^{^} Shipments figures based on certification alone.
