= Al-Zarah (Bahrayn) =

Map showing the possible location of al-Zarah (upper center-left) in the late 9th century

Al-Zarah (Arabic: الزارة) was an ancient and medieval settlement of Eastern Arabia. Although no longer extant, it is believed to have been situated near the modern city of al-Qatif.

== Location ==
Al-Zarah was a port town located in the area of the al-Qatif oasis, near the coast of the Persian Gulf. In the early Islamic period it was considered to be part of the region of al-Bahrayn, which then encompassed much of the eastern Arabian shoreline and adjacent territories, and mentions of it were included in accounts of the area by geographers such as Ibn al-Faqih (fl. 902) and Ibn Khurradadhbih (d. 912). The anonymous author of the Kitab al-manasik wa-amakin turuq al-hajj wa-ma'alim al-jazirah, writing in the ninth or tenth centuries, described it as laying between al-Uqayr and Qulay'a, and added that its inhabitants fed primarily on dates and fish.

Modern scholars have proposed various possibilities for the former location of the town. The Saudi historian Hamad al-Jassir identified al-Zarah with the modern al-Awamiyyah, five kilometers west of al-Qatif, while D. T. Potts suggested that it may have been located at the more southerly Dhahran. According to Farouk Omar, the site of the settlement is now marked by the modern name of al-Ramada.

== History ==
In the pre-Islamic era al-Zarah was an important commercial center along the Arabian coast. By the early seventh century al-Bahrayn had come to be dominated by the Arab tribes of Abd al-Qays, Bakr ibn Wa'il, and Tamim, but the town itself was also likely host to a considerable population of non-Arab residents. As with the rest of region, al-Zarah was subject to Persian control during this period, and it was the seat of a Sassanid marzban or margrave.

Following the death of Muhammad in 632, al-Zarah briefly emerged as a local center of anti-Muslim resistance. During the ridda wars in the caliphate of Abu Bakr, the Persian governor Azad Peroz and a number of Magians refused to pay the jizya and fortified themselves in the town, which was then subjected to a siege by al-Ala ibn al-Hadrami. The garrison held out until the Muslims managed to cut off the water supply, at which point it came to terms and agreed to hand over to al-Ala one-third of the town, one-third of its gold and silver, and half of its outlying parts in c. 634.

At the end of the ninth century al-Zarah was governed by one al-Hasan ibn al-Awwam, a member of the Azd, but a short time later it was burnt down during the Qarmatian conquest of al-Bahrayn. The town subsequently lapsed into obscurity, and by the turn of the thirteenth century the historian Majd al-Din ibn al-Athir considered it to no longer be a place name.
