= Yenal =

Yenal is a Turkish given name and surname. Notable people with the name include:

- Yenal Tuncer, Turkish footballer
- Meriç Banu Yenal, Turkish basketball player
- Metin Yenal, German actor
