= Bano =

Bano or baño may refer to:

== People ==
=== Given name ===
- Bano Khalil Ahmed (born 1969), Pakistani politician
- Bano Haralu, Indian journalist and a conservationist
- Bano Qudsia (1928–2017), also known as Bano Aapa, Pakistani novelist, playwright and spiritualist
- Bano Traoré (born 1985), Malian athlete

=== Surname ===
- Arsénio Bano (born 1974), East Timorese politician
- Fatima Bano, Indian wrestling coach
- Franco Bano (born 1986), Argentinian footballer
- Ilir Bano, Albanian politician
- Iqbal Bano (1935–2009), Pakistani ghazal singer
- Jeelani Bano (1936–2026), Indian Urdu writer
- Khursheed Bano (1914–2001), Pakistani singer and actress
- Noor Bano (politician), Indian politician
- Saadat Bano (1893–1970), Indian independence activist and poet
- Saira Bano (born 1944), Indian actress
- Shah Bano (1916–1992), Indian feminist, party to the landmark 1985 Supreme Court of India case Mohd. Ahmed Khan v. Shah Bano Begum
- Shamim Bano, actress in Indian cinema

=== Other ===
- Albano Carrisi (born 1943), better known as Al Bano, Italian singer-songwriter, actor and winemaker

== Arts and entertainment ==
- Bano (novel), by Pakistani novelist Razia Butt
- El baño, a 2005 Chilean film
- "El Baño", a 2018 song by Enrique Iglesias

== Geography ==
- Bano block, a community development block of the Simdega district, Jharkhand, India
  - Bano, Simdega, a village
    - Bano railway station
- Monte Bano, a mountain in the province of Genoa, Italy

== See also ==
- Banos (disambiguation)
- Banu (disambiguation)
- Banneux, a village in the province of Liège, Belgium
