= Rajani Duganna =

Indian politician (1945–2023)

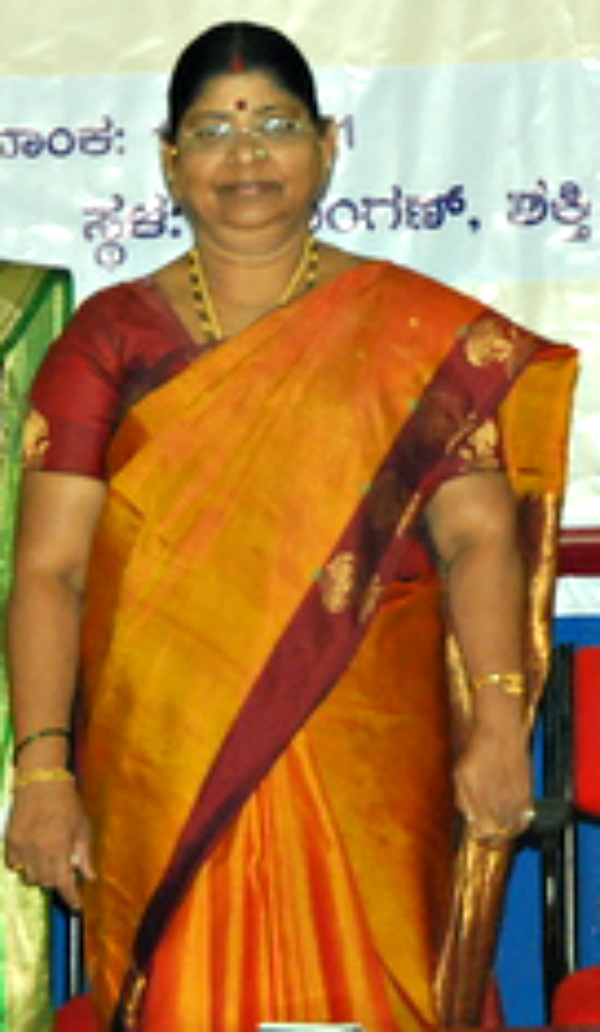
Rajani Duganna

Rajani Duganna (1945 – 9 July 2023) was an Indian politician who served as 24th mayor of Mangalore City Corporation. She took office on 26 February 2010, with B. Rajendra Kumar as deputy mayor. She was the fifth woman to become mayor of the city corporation since its establishment in 1984. She was a Billava and belonged to the Bharatiya Janata Party (BJP). Duganna was succeeded as mayor by her cousin Praveen Kumar on 28 February 2011. Duganna died on 9 July 2023, at the age of 78.
