= Bhanu =

Bhanu may be:

- an epithet of the deity Surya
- Bhanu (Mahabharata), son of Krishna and Satyabhama
- the name of a place in Nepal:
  - Bhanu Municipality, the current municipality
  - Bhanu, Nepal, the former VDC
- a given name; notable people with the name include:
  - Muktha (actress), stage name Bhanu
  - Bhanu (Tamil militant)
  - Bhanu Bandopadhyay, Indian actor
  - Bhanubhakta Acharya, Nepali writer

== See also ==
- Banu (disambiguation)
