= Bannu (disambiguation) =

Bannu is a city in Pakistan.

Bannu may also refer to:

- Bannu District, a district of Khyber Pakhtunkhwa, Pakistan
- Bannu Division, an administrative unit of Khyber Pakhtunkhwa, Pakistan
- Bannu Airport, an airport in Pakistan
- Bannu railway station, a railway station in Pakistan

== See also ==
- Bannu Biradari, a Hindu community
- Bannu Brigade, a former part of India's Northern Command
- Bannu Resolution, a resolution from Pashtun community to British Raj in 1947
- Banu (disambiguation)
