= Abu Sa'id al-Jannabi =

10th-century ruler of Qarmatian state in Bahrayn

Abu Sa'id Hasan ibn Bahram al-Jannabi
- Ruler of the Qarmatian state in Bahrayn
- Rule: before 899 – June/July 913
- Successor: Abu'l-Qasim Sa'id al-Jannabi overthrown by Abu Tahir al-Jannabi
- Born: 845/855; Jannaba, Arrajan Province
- Died: June/July 913 al-Ahsa
- Religion: Qarmatian Isma'ilism

Abu Sa'id Hasan ibn Bahram al-Jannabi (Arabic: أبو سعيد حسن بن بهرام الجنابي, romanized: Abū Saʿīd Ḥasan ibn Bahrām al-Jannābī; 845/855–913/914) was an Arabized Persian Shia and the founder of the Qarmatian state in Bahrayn (an area comprising the eastern parts of modern Saudi Arabia as well as the Persian Gulf, overlapping the earlier historical Beth Qatraye region). By 899, his followers controlled large parts of the region, and in 900, he scored a major victory over an Abbasid army sent to subdue him. He captured the local capital, Hajar, in 903, and extended his rule south and east into Oman. He was assassinated in 913, and succeeded by his eldest son Sa'id.

His religious teachings and political activities are somewhat unclear, as they are reported by later and usually hostile sources, but he seems to have shared the millennialist Isma'ili belief about the imminent return of the mahdī, hostility to conventional Islamic rites and rituals, and to have based the Qarmatian society on the principles of communal ownership and egalitarianism, with a system of production and distribution overseen by appointed agents. The Qarmatian "republic" he founded would last until the late 11th century.

== Early life ==
Abu Sa'id was an Arabized Persian, from Bandar Ganaveh in coastal Fars. He was born sometime between 845 and 855, and was reportedly crippled on his left side. He later claimed (or it was claimed by his followers) that he had an Alid descent, or a royal descent from the Sasanian dynasty, but in his early life he was a furrier or flour merchant, initially in his native Jannaba, and later in the vicinity of Kufa, where he moved.

There he married into the Banu'l-Qassar family, who were prominent members of the Isma'ili community in the area. He was proselytised and taught by the Isma'ili missionary (dā'ī) Abu Muhammad Abdan, the brother-in-law of Hamdan Qarmat, the overall leader of the Isma'ili movement in Iraq. In the period about 874/884, Abu Sa'id was then in turn sent as a dā'ī to proselytise in Fars, in the area of Jannaba, Siniz, Tawwaj, and Mahruban. His mission was successful, and he gathered converts and funds: all dā'īs were required to gather funds for the awaited mahdī, who was still in Occultation. Eventually, however, he was denounced to the Sunni authorities. His treasure and stores were confiscated, but Abu Sa'id managed to escape and went into hiding, perhaps in Basra.

== Conquest of Bahrayn ==
Map of eastern and central Arabia in the 9th–10th centuries

According to the report of Ibn Hawqal, at that time he met with Hamdan Qarmat, who recognized Abu Sa'id's abilities and entrusted him with leading the missionary effort in Bahrayn, a region encompassing all of eastern Arabia from the borders of Iraq to Qatar. Bahrayn is generally ignored by the historical sources of the period; the area was under Abbasid rule, but according to the Encyclopaedia of Islam, "the Arabic sources fail to tell much about its extent or effectiveness".

According to the 10th-century historian al-Mas'udi, Abu Sa'id arrived there in 886/7, but other sources place this at different dates, from 894 to 896, or even as late as 899, by which time however he is known to have established himself as a power in the area; as a result the later dates are unlikely to be correct. Abu Sa'id initially assumed the role of a flour merchant in the town of Qatif, where he established crucial bonds with the Banu Sanbar, a Thaqafi family of some prominence: the three sons, Hasan, Ali and Hamdan, became his closest supporters, while Hasan's daughter became his wife. The family would continue to play a leading role in the Qarmatian state over the next decades. According to Ibn Hawqal and Akhu Muhsin, the Isma'ili community he founded initially consisted of the "small folk, butchers, porters, and the like". At Bahrayn he encountered another Isma'ili dā'ī, Abu Zakariya al-Tamami, who had been sent by the Yemeni dā'ī Ibn Hawshab, and who had managed to convert the Banu Kilab tribe. A certain rivalry ensued, but before too long the two became reluctant partners, until Abu Sa'id finally had Abu Zakariya imprisoned and killed. Abu Sa'id nevertheless managed to gain the backing not only of the Kilab, but also of the Banu Uqayl, who became the core of his military forces.

The Bedouin tribes were, in the words of Heinz Halm, "an ideal target group" for the dā'ī: The—admittedly rabidly anti-Isma'ili—account of Akhu Muhsin describes the tribes as "accustomed to war, but at the same time strong and ignorant, carefree and far from the law of Islam, with no knowledge of prophecy, or of what is allowed and forbidden". Indeed, the first group to join the cause, the Banu al-Adbat, a sub-tribe of the Kilab, had previously been shunned on account of a blood feud. Joining Abu Sa'id's revolutionary doctrine gave them not only the prospect of booty and power, but also of redemption.

With the backing of a strong Bedouin army, Abu Sa'id began attacking towns in the area: Qatif, Zara, Safwan, Zahran, al-Hasa, and Juwata. His expeditions reached as far east as Sohar (which he briefly captured after several attempts) in Oman and west to Bilad al-Falaj and south to Yabrin; the central al-Yamama region was left devastated and depopulated in the process, as the local tribes of Banu Qushayr and Banu Sa'd were either killed or expelled. Yamama was probably not placed under Qarmatian control, although they clashed with the Banu 'l-Ukhaidhir who ruled it at the time, and who later became allies of the Qarmatians. At some unknown point, Abu Sa'id even captured the island of Awal (modern Bahrain), and imposed tariffs on shipping there.

In 899, a major rift occurred in the Isma'ili movement, when Hamdan Qarmat and Abu Muhammad Abdan denounced the movement's secret leadership at Salamiya, which had been taken over by Sa'id ibn al-Husayn, the future founder of the Fatimid Caliphate. Shortly after that, Hamdan Qarmat disappeared, while Abu Muhammad was murdered in the same year at the instigation of Zakarawayh ibn Mihrawayh, apparently on the instructions of Salamiya. After Hamdan's disappearance, the term "Qarmatians" was retained by all Isma'ilis who refused to recognize the claims of Sa'id, and subsequently of the Fatimid dynasty. Abu Sa'id likewise rejected Sa'id's claims; apart from ideological reasons and loyalty to his masters, political considerations may also have played a role, as this was "a favourable opportunity to make himself completely independent", as Wilferd Madelung put it. It was also at that time, according to Ibn Hawqal, that he had his rival Abu Zakariya al-Tamami imprisoned and executed, as he remained loyal to Sa'id. In later decades the Fatimids launched attempts to get the Qarmatian communities to recognize their leadership, but although they were successful in some areas, throughout their existence, the Qarmatians in Bahrayn refused to do so. Neither, however, did Abu Sa'id try to coordinate his movements with the other Qarmatian groups active in the Abbasid territories, such as the rebellions launched in Syria and Iraq by Zakarawayh ibn Mihrawayh and his sons in 901–907.

By 899, Abu Sa'id's followers controlled most of Bahrayn, except for the regional capital Hajar, which was still under Abbasid control, and in the north had advanced up to the vicinity of Basra. The fall of Qatif in that year alarmed the populace of Basra, as they realised that a Qarmatian attack on the city was now a possibility; hasty work commenced to erect a brick wall around the hitherto unfortified city. Early in 900, Abu Sa'id began his siege of Hajar, but as the city resisted for several months, he established his own residence and base of operations (dār al-hijra) at al-Ahsa (modern al-Hofuf), some two miles from Hajar. The news of the siege prompted the reaction of the Abbasid caliph al-Mu'tadid, who in April 900 named his general al-Abbas ibn Amr al-Ghanawi governor of Bahrayn and Yamama, and sent him with 2,000 soldiers, augmented with volunteers, against Abu Sa'id's forces. On 31 July, in a salt marsh some two days' march from Qatif, the Abbasid army was defeated in battle. Al-Ghanawi was taken prisoner and later released, but the other captives, reportedly 700 in number, were executed. In the aftermath of this success, Hajar was captured, only to be lost again after the arrival of a new Abbasid governor in 901, while Abu Sa'id was leading an expedition in the vicinity of Basra. In late 903, the Abbasid governor Ibn Banu reported to the central government in Baghdad that he had captured Qatif and defeated and killed Abu Sa'id's designated successor there. Nevertheless, around the same time or a little later, Hajar was forced to surrender anew to the Qarmatians after they cut its water supply. Many of its inhabitants chose flight to Awal, Siraf, and other places, while many who remained behind were either killed or converted in the pillaging that followed.

Despite the destruction visited upon it, Hajar remained the chief city and capital of Bahrayn. Abu Sa'id, however, established his own palatial residence at al-Ahsa oasis, where he ruled in the traditional manner of an Arab prince. From Bahrayn, the Qarmatians launched a series of raids against the vicinities of Basra, both to capture slaves and in retaliation for the participation of the local Zabba tribe in the 900 campaign against them. The most notable of these raids occurred in July/August 912, but although the local Abbasid governor was reportedly unable to confront it, the sources report that the force involved was very small, barely 30 men.

== Governance and doctrine ==
As the founder of the Qarmatian "republic" of Bahrayn, he was ascribed by later generations the establishment of its institutions. While certainly far from their fully developed form as reported by Ibn Hawqal, he certainly did initiate some of them. The Qarmatian system was based on communal ownership and egalitarianism, with a system of production and distribution overseen by Abu Sa'id's agents. For example, any livestock and supplies taken during raids were stored and distributed; slaves were employed in communal labour; the herding of cattle, camels, and sheep, the production of arms and clothing, were centrally directed; and all boys taken captive were trained together from the age of four, both in arms and riding and in the Qarmatian doctrine. Workers and artisans were organised into primitive guilds, and a council, the al-ʿIqdāniyya, comprising representatives of leading families and senior officials, was also established in an advisory capacity. Some modern commentators have described this system as a "kind of socialism", the Qarmatians as the "Bolsheviks of Islam", and their state as the "only communist society to control a large territory, and to endure for more than a generation, before the twentieth century".

His religious teachings are less clear, as the Qarmatians of Bahrayn left no testimonies of their own; what is known about them is reported by few, foreign, and usually heavily hostile sources. Initially, he obviously adhered to the millennialist Isma'ili teachings about the imminent return of the mahdī, Muhammad ibn Isma'il. After the rift of 899, he no longer recognized the authority of Sa'id; according to the qāḍī Abd al-Jabbar ibn Ahmad, Abu Sa'id now claimed that the mahdī was no longer Ibn Isma'il but Muhammad, the son of Abdallah ibn Muhammad ibn al-Hanafiyyah, whose appearance was expected in 912, the year 300 of the Hijri calendar, but this information is of dubious reliability. When the date passed without incident—in the meantime Sa'id had declared himself as the mahdī and founded the Fatimid Caliphate in Ifriqiya—the failure of the prophecy is said to have caused considerable embarrassment to the Qarmatian regime.

Following Isma'ili expectations that the mahdī would reveal the "hidden" or "inner" (bāṭin) truths of the religion to his followers, thus ushering an "age of pure spiritual knowledge" and making religious laws and customs obsolete, Abu Sa'id abolished numerous Islamic rites, such as prayer and fasting.

== Death and succession ==
Al-Mas'udi reports that Abu Sa'id was murdered in June/July 913 while taking his bath in his palace by two ṣaqlabī eunuch slaves. Several of his higher-ranking officers and followers were killed at the same time, including Ali and Hamdan ibn Sanbar. However, the death was not reported in Baghdad until the summer of 914, perhaps indicating that it was kept secret until then. The reason for his murder is unknown, but Heinz Halm suggests it may be linked to the failed prophecy on the appearance of the mahdī the previous year.

He left seven or six sons, who due to their youth were at first under the tutelage of their uncle Hasan, the last of the three Banu Sanbar brothers. Power was likely nominally invested among all of Abu Sa'id's sons, as a response composed soon after Abu Sa'id's death to a letter from the Abbasid vizier was written on behalf of all sons. Among his sons, the oldest, Abu'l-Qasim Sa'id al-Jannabi, was at first the pre-eminent, but his reign was brief; he was replaced by the youngest son, Abu Tahir al-Jannabi, at the latest by 923. The reason and manner of the transition is unclear. Most Arabic sources agree that Abu Sa'id had appointed him as his heir, but that he was deposed in 923 by Abu Tahir. Another tradition, by the Kufan anti-Isma'ili polemicist Abu Abdallah Muhammad ibn Ali ibn Rizam al-Ta'i, reports that Abu Sa'id had always intended for Abu Tahir to succeed him, and had named Sa'id only as regent, and that Sa'id voluntarily relinquished power to his brother in 917/918.

Following his death, Abu Sa'id became the object of veneration by his followers. It was believed that he would return to lead them, to the point that a saddled horse was kept at the entrance of his tomb. The state he founded survived until its overthrow by the Uyunids in the 1070s, and as late as the mid-11th century the Bahrayni Qarmatians called themselves Abū Saʿīdīs after him.

== Sources ==
- Carra de Vaux, B. & Hodgson, M. G. S. (1965). "al-D̲j̲annābī, Abū Saʿīd Ḥasan b. Bahrām". In Lewis, B.; Pellat, Ch. & Schacht, J. (eds.). The Encyclopaedia of Islam, Second Edition. Volume II: C–G. Leiden: E. J. Brill. p. 452. OCLC 495469475.
- Daftary, Farhad (2007). The Ismāʿı̄lı̄s: Their History and Doctrines (Second ed.). Cambridge: Cambridge University Press. ISBN 978-0-521-61636-2.
- Halm, Heinz (1991). Das Reich des Mahdi: Der Aufstieg der Fatimiden [The Empire of the Mahdi: The Rise of the Fatimids] (in German). Munich: C. H. Beck. ISBN 978-3-406-35497-7.
- Hitti, Philip K. (2002) [1937]. History of the Arabs: From the Earliest Times to the Present (Revised Tenth ed.). Basingstoke and New York: Palgrave Macmillan. ISBN 0-333-63141-2.
- Madelung, Wilferd (1978). "Ḳarmaṭī". In van Donzel, E.; Lewis, B.; Pellat, Ch. & Bosworth, C. E. (eds.). The Encyclopaedia of Islam, Second Edition. Volume IV: Iran–Kha. Leiden: E. J. Brill. pp. 660–665. doi:10.1163/1573-3912_islam_COM_0451. ISBN 978-90-04-05745-6. OCLC 758278456.
- Madelung, Wilferd (1983). "ABŪ SAʿĪD JANNĀBĪ". In Yarshater, Ehsan (ed.). Encyclopædia Iranica. Vol. I/4: Abū Manṣūr Heravı̄–Adat. London and New York: Routledge & Kegan Paul. pp. 380–381. ISBN 978-0-71009-093-5.
- Madelung, Wilferd (1996). "The Fatimids and the Qarmatīs of Bahrayn". In Daftary, Farhad (ed.). Mediaeval Isma'ili History and Thought. Cambridge University Press. pp. 21–73. ISBN 978-0-521-00310-0.
- Öz, Mustafa (1993). "Cennâbî, Ebû Saîd". TDV Encyclopedia of Islam, Vol. 7 (Ca'fer es-Sâdik – Ci̇ltçi̇li̇k) (in Turkish). Istanbul: Presidency of Religious Affairs, Centre for Islamic Studies. p. 371. ISBN 978-975-389-434-0.
- Rentz, G. & Mulligan, W. E. (1960). "al-Baḥrayn". In Gibb, H. A. R.; Kramers, J. H.; Lévi-Provençal, E.; Schacht, J.; Lewis, B. & Pellat, Ch. (eds.). The Encyclopaedia of Islam, Second Edition. Volume I: A–B. Leiden: E. J. Brill. pp. 941–944. OCLC 495469456.
- Rexroth, Kenneth (1974). Communalism: From Its Origins to the Twentieth Century. Seabury Press. ISBN 0-81649204-2.
