= Benu =

Benu may refer to:

== People ==
- Benu Dasgupta (1928–2010), Indian cricket player
- Benu Gopal Bangur (born 1931), Indian businessman
- Benu Malla (8th century), 3rd king of the Bagdi Malla dynasty of Bishnupur
- Benu Sen (1932–2011), Indian photographer

== Other ==
- Benu (restaurant), a Michelin-starred restaurant in San Francisco, California

== See also ==
- 101955 Bennu, a carbonaceous asteroid
- Bennu, an ancient Egyptian deity
- Benow (disambiguation)
