= Praveen Kumar =

Praveen Kumar may also refer to:

- Praveen Kumar Sobti (1947–2022), Indian film and television actor, discus thrower, and politician
- Praveen Kumar (cricketer) (born 1986), Indian cricketer from Uttar Pradesh
- Praveen Kumar (dancer) (born 1971), Indian dancer
- Praveen Kumar (para-athlete, born 2003), Indian high jump para-athlete
- K. Praveen Kumar, Indian politician and MLA for Koyilandy
- Praveen Kumar (Mangalore politician), former mayor of Mangalore City Corporation
- Praveen Kumar (Delhi politician) (born 1984), member of the Sixth Legislative Assembly of Delhi
- R. S. Praveen Kumar (born 1967), retired Indian policeman
- Praveen Kumar (para-athlete, born 1992), Paralympic javelin thrower
- Praveen Kumar (police officer), IPS officer
