= Hollywood Bitch =

2001 single by Stone Temple Pilots

- Australian cover artwork (with "Revolution")

Single by Stone Temple Pilots

from the album Shangri-La Dee Da
- A-side: "Revolution" (Australia only)
- B-side: "Bi-Polar Bear"; "Trippin' on a Hole in a Paper Heart" (live)
- Released: August 14, 2001
- Genre: Hard rock
- Length: 2:44
- Label: Atlantic
- Songwriters: Scott Weiland; Robert DeLeo
- Producer: Brendan O'Brien

Stone Temple Pilots singles chronology
| "Days of the Week" (2001) | "Hollywood Bitch" (2001) | "Revolution" (2001) |

Audio sample
- "Hollywood Bitch": file; help

"Hollywood Bitch" is a song by the American rock band Stone Temple Pilots. It is the second and final single from the group's fifth studio album, Shangri-La Dee Da. The song was written by vocalist Scott Weiland and bassist Robert DeLeo. Dean DeLeo stated in a 2001 interview that the main riff for the song was actually written before their second album, Purple (1994), had been released.

"Hollywood Bitch" was serviced to US rock radio on August 14, 2001, and became a top-30 on the Billboard Mainstream Rock Tracks and Modern Rock Tracks charts that October. In Australia, the song was released as a double A-side with the band's next single, "Revolution", in December 2001.

== Track listing ==
Australian CD single

1. "Hollywood Bitch" (album version)
2. "Revolution" (single version)
3. "Bi-Polar Bear" (album version)
4. "Trippin' on a Hole in a Paper Heart" (live)

== Charts ==
| Chart (2001) | Peak position |
|---|---|
| US Alternative Airplay (Billboard) | 29 |
| US Mainstream Rock (Billboard) | 25 |

== Release history ==
| Region | Date | Format(s) | Label(s) | Ref. |
|---|---|---|---|---|
| United States | August 14, 2001 | Active rock; alternative radio | Atlantic | |
| Australia | December 17, 2001 | CD (with "Revolution") | Atlantic | |
