= Revolution (Beatles song) =

1968 song by the Beatles

- UK single B-side label

Single by the Beatles
- A-side: "Hey Jude"
- Released: 26 August 1968
- Recorded: 9–13 July 1968
- Studio: EMI (London)
- Genre: Hard rock; rock and roll
- Length: 3:21
- Label: Apple
- Songwriter: Lennon–McCartney
- Producer: George Martin

The Beatles singles chronology
"Lady Madonna" (1968)	"Hey Jude" / "Revolution" (1968)	"Get Back" (1969)

Promotional film
- "Revolution" on YouTube

"Revolution 1"
- Northern Songs sheet music cover

Song by the Beatles

from the album The Beatles
- Released: 22 November 1968
- Recorded: 30–31 May and 4 & 21 June 1968
- Studio: EMI (London)
- Genre: Blues; folk rock; blues rock
- Length: 4:17
- Label: Apple
- Songwriter: Lennon–McCartney
- Producer: George Martin

"Revolution" is a song by the English rock band the Beatles, written by John Lennon and credited to the Lennon–McCartney partnership. Three versions of the song were recorded and released in 1968, all during sessions for the Beatles' self-titled double album, also known as the "White Album": a slow, bluesy arrangement ("Revolution 1") included on the album; an abstract sound collage (titled "Revolution 9") that originated as the latter part of "Revolution 1" and appears on the same album; and the faster, hard rock version similar to "Revolution 1", released as the B-side of "Hey Jude". Although the single version was issued first, it was recorded several weeks after "Revolution 1", intended for release as a single. A music video for the song was shot using the backing track from the single version, their appearances reflecting the song's atmosphere, along with live-sung lyrics that more closely resemble the album version.

Inspired by political protests in early 1968, Lennon's lyrics expressed sympathy with the need for social change but doubt in regard to the violent tactics espoused by some members of the New Left. Despite his bandmates' reservations, he persevered with the song and insisted it be included on their next single. When released in August, the song was viewed by the political left as a betrayal of their cause and a sign that the Beatles were out of step with radical elements of the counterculture. The release of "Revolution 1" in November indicated Lennon's uncertainty about destructive change, with the phrase "count me out" recorded instead as "count me out – in". Lennon was stung by the criticism he received from the New Left and subsequently espoused the need for Marxist revolution, particularly with his 1971 single "Power to the People". However, in one of the final interviews he gave before his death in 1980, he reaffirmed the pacifist sentiments expressed in "Revolution".

"Revolution" reached number 12 on the Billboard Hot 100 in the US and topped singles charts in Australia and New Zealand. "Revolution" has received praise from music critics, particularly for the intensity of the performance and the heavily distorted guitar sound. In 1987, the song became the first Beatles recording to be licensed for a television commercial, which prompted a lawsuit from the surviving members of the group. The song has been covered by numerous artists, including Thompson Twins, who performed it at Live Aid in July 1985, and Stone Temple Pilots.

== Background and composition ==
In early 1968, media coverage in the aftermath of the Tet Offensive spurred increased protests in opposition to the Vietnam War, especially among university students. The protests were most prevalent in the United States, and on 17 March, 25,000 demonstrators marched to the American embassy in London's Grosvenor Square and violently clashed with police. Major protests concerning other political issues made international news, such as the March 1968 protests in Poland against their communist government, and the campus uprisings of May 1968 in France. The upheaval reflected the increased politicisation of the 1960s youth movement and the rise of New Left ideology, in a contrast with the hippie ideology behind the 1967 Summer of Love. For these students and activists, the Maoist idea of cultural revolution, purging society of its non-progressive elements, provided a model for social change.

By and large, the Beatles had avoided publicly expressing their political views in their music, with "Taxman" being their only overtly political track thus far. Viewed as leaders of the counterculture, the band – particularly John Lennon – were under pressure from Leninist, Stalinist, Trotskyist and Maoist groups to actively support the revolutionary cause. Lennon decided to write a song about the recent wave of social upheaval while the Beatles were in Rishikesh, India, studying Transcendental Meditation. He recalled, "I thought it was about time we spoke about it, the same as I thought it was about time we stopped not answering about the Vietnamese war [in 1966]. I had been thinking about it up in the hills in India." Lennon began writing the song there and completed it in England in May, inspired especially by events in France.

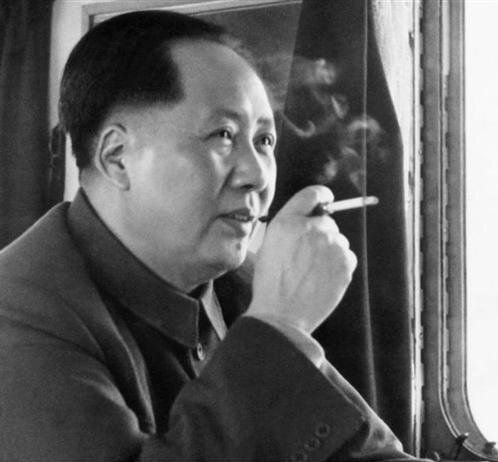
Chairman Mao Zedong is referenced in the song.

Despite Lennon's antiwar feelings, he had yet to become anti-establishment, and expressed in "Revolution" that he wanted "to see the plan" from those advocating toppling the system. In author Mark Hertsgaard's description, the lyrics advocate social change but emphasise that "political actions [should] be judged on moral rather than ideological grounds". The repeated phrase "it's gonna be alright" came directly from Lennon's Transcendental Meditation experiences in India, conveying the idea that God would take care of the human race no matter what happened politically. Another influence on Lennon was his burgeoning relationship with avant-garde artist Yoko Ono and her espousal of sexual politics as an alternative to Maoist ideas and other hardline philosophies adopted by the political left. Lennon credited Ono with awakening him from his passive mindset of the previous year.

Around the fourth week of May 1968, the Beatles met at Kinfauns, George Harrison's home in Esher, to demonstrate their songs to each other in preparation for recording their next studio album. A recording from that informal session released in the White Album's Super Deluxe version shows that "Revolution" had two of its three verses intact. The lines referencing Mao Zedong – "But if you go carrying pictures of Chairman Mao / You ain't gonna make it with anyone anyhow" – were added in the studio. While filming a promotional clip later that year, Lennon told director Michael Lindsay-Hogg that it was the most important lyric in the song.

== Recording ==
=== "Revolution 1" ===
The Beatles began the recording sessions for their new album on 30 May, starting with "Revolution 1" (simply titled "Revolution" for the first few sessions). At this first session, they concentrated on recording the basic rhythm track. Take 18 lasted 10:17, much longer than the earlier takes, and it was this take that was chosen for additional overdubs recorded over the next two sessions. The full take 18 was officially released in 2018, as part of the Super Deluxe Edition of The Beatles coinciding with the album's fiftieth anniversary.

During overdubs which brought the recording to take 20, Lennon took the unusual step of performing his lead vocal while lying on the floor. He also altered one line into the ambiguous "you can count me out, in". He later explained that he included both because he was undecided in his sentiments.

"Revolution 1"
Portion of "Revolution 1", as released on the White Album

"Revolution 1" has a blues style, performed at a relaxed tempo. The basic time signature is 12/8 (or 4/4 in a shuffle style), but the song has several extra half-length bars during the verses. There are also two extra beats at the end of the last chorus, the result of an accidental bad edit during the mixing process that was left uncorrected at Lennon's request.

==== Take 20 ====
Monitor mixes of the full-length version of "Revolution 1" became available on bootlegs such as From Kinfauns to Chaos in the 1990s. In 2009, a high-quality version labelled "Revolution Take 20" appeared on the bootleg CD Revolution: Take ... Your Knickers Off! The release triggered considerable interest among the media and fans of the group. This version, RM1 (Remix in Mono #1) of take 20, runs to 10 minutes 46 seconds (at the correct speed) and was created at the end of the 4 June session, with a copy taken away by Lennon. It was an attempt by Lennon to augment the full-length version of "Revolution" in a way that satisfied him before he chose to split the piece between the edited "Revolution 1" and the musique concrète "Revolution 9".

The bootlegged recording starts with engineer Peter Bown announcing the remix as "RM1 of Take ..." and then momentarily forgetting the take number, which Lennon jokingly finishes with "Take your knickers off and let's go!" The first half of the recording is almost identical to the released track "Revolution 1". It lacks the electric guitar and horn overdubs of the final version, but features two tape loops in the key of A (same as the song) that are faded in and out at various points. After the final chorus, the song launches into an extended coda similar to that in "Hey Jude". (The album version only features about 40 seconds of this coda.) Beyond the point where the album version fades out, the basic instrumental backing keeps repeating while the vocals and overdubs become increasingly chaotic: Harrison and Paul McCartney repeatedly sing "dada, mama" in a childlike register; Lennon's histrionic vocals are randomly distorted in speed (a little of this can be heard in the fade of "Revolution 1"); and radio tuning noises à la "I Am the Walrus" appear. Several elements of this coda appear in the officially released "Revolution 9".

After the band track ends, the song moves into avant-garde territory, with Yoko Ono reciting some prose over a portion of the song "Awal Hamsa" by Farid al-Atrash (captured from the studio recording). Ono's piece begins with the words "Maybe, it's not that ...", with her voice trailing off at the end; McCartney jokingly replies, "It is 'that'!" As the piece continues, Lennon quietly mumbles "Gonna be alright" a few times. Then follows a brief piano riff, some comments from Lennon and Ono on how well the track has proceeded, and final appearances of the tape loops.

==== Splitting of "Revolution 1" and "Revolution 9" ====
Lennon soon decided to divide the existing ten-minute recording into two parts: a more conventional Beatles track and an avant-garde sound collage. Within days after take 20, work began on "Revolution 9" using the last six minutes of the take as a starting point. Numerous sound effects, tape loops, and overdubs were recorded and compiled over several sessions almost exclusively by Lennon and Ono, although Harrison provided assistance for spoken overdubs. With more than 40 sources used for "Revolution 9", only small portions of the take 20 coda are heard in the final mix; most prominent from take 20 are Lennon's multiple screams of "right" and "alright", and around a minute near the end featuring Ono's lines up to "you become naked".

On 21 June, the first part of take 20 received several overdubs and became officially titled "Revolution 1". The overdubs included a lead guitar line by Harrison and a brass section of two trumpets and four trombones. Final stereo mixing was completed on 25 June. The final mix that would ultimately be included on the "White Album" included the hurried announcement of "take two" by Geoff Emerick at the beginning of the song.

=== Single version ===
Lennon wanted "Revolution 1" to be the next Beatles single, but McCartney was reluctant to invite controversy, and argued along with Harrison that the track was too slow for a single. Lennon persisted, and rehearsals for a faster and louder remake began on 9 July. Recording started the following day. Writing in 2014, music journalist Ian Fortnam paired "Revolution" with the White Album track "Helter Skelter" as the Beatles' two "proto-metal experiment[s]" of 1968.

"Revolution"
Intro and opening verse of the single version of the song

The song begins with "a startling machine-gun fuzz guitar riff", according to music critic Richie Unterberger, with Lennon and Harrison's guitars prominent throughout the track. The riff was borrowed from Pee Wee Crayton's "Do Unto Others". (Note: Music critic Tim Riley describes Lennon's opening guitar figure as a musical quote from "Do Unto Others", a 1954 song by Pee Wee Crayton.) In the words of Paul McCartney, the riff was played on "a bit of a cheap Gibson", a hollowbody guitar with a laminated maple top that gave it some bite and warmth. The distorted sound was achieved by direct injection of the guitar signal into the mixing console. Emerick later explained that he routed the signal through two microphone preamplifiers in series while keeping the amount of overload just below the point of overheating the console. This was such a severe abuse of the studio equipment that Emerick thought, "If I was the studio manager and saw this going on, I'd fire myself." Lennon overdubbed the opening scream, and double-tracked some of the words "so roughly that its careless spontaneity becomes a point in itself", according to author Ian MacDonald.

"Revolution" was performed in a higher key, B major, compared to the A major of "Revolution 1". The "shoo-bee-do-wop" backing vocals were omitted in the remake, and an instrumental break was added. "Revolution" was given a climactic ending, as opposed to the fade out of "Revolution 1". For this version, Lennon unequivocally sang "count me out". An electric piano overdub by Nicky Hopkins was added on 11 July, with final overdubs taking place on 13 July and mono mixing on 15 July.

Despite Lennon's efforts, McCartney's "Hey Jude" was selected as the A-side of the band's next single. Having sought to reassert his leadership of the Beatles over McCartney, Lennon reluctantly agreed to have "Revolution" demoted to the B-side. (Note: In his December 1970 interview with Rolling Stone, Lennon said "Hey Jude" was worthy of an A-side, "but we could have had both." In 1980, he told Playboy he still disagreed with the decision.)

== Release ==
The "Hey Jude" / "Revolution" single was issued on 26 August 1968 in the US, with the UK release taking place on 30 August. Two days after the record's US release, violent scenes occurred at the 1968 Democratic National Convention in Chicago, as police and National Guardsmen were filmed clubbing Vietnam War protestors. This event came two months after the assassination of Robert F. Kennedy, the Democratic presidential nominee who had pledged to end America's involvement in Vietnam, and coincided with further militant action in Europe. According to author Jonathan Gould, this combination ensured that, contrary to Lennon's doubts about the song's relevance, "'Revolution' had been rendered all too relevant by the onrushing tide of events."

The single was the band's first release on Apple Records, their EMI-distributed record label. As part of their Apple Corps business enterprise, the label was run on counterculture principles and intended to be a form of what McCartney termed "Western communism". The single was one of the four records that were sent in gift-wrapped boxes, marked "Our First Four", to Queen Elizabeth II and other members of the royal family, and to Harold Wilson, the British prime minister. According to music journalist Jim Irvin, the heavily distorted sound of "Revolution" led some record buyers to return their copies, in the belief that "there was bad surface noise" on the disc. Irvin recalled of his own experience: "The exasperated [shop] assistant explained, for the umpteenth time that Saturday, 'It's supposed to sound like that. We've checked with EMI ...'"

"Hey Jude" topped sales charts around the world, while "Revolution" was a highly popular B-side. In the US, where each side of a single continued to be listed individually, it peaked at number 12 on the Billboard Hot 100, number 11 on the Cash Box Top 100, and number 2 on Record World's chart. The latter peak was achieved while "Hey Jude" was at number 1. The single was listed as a double-sided number 1 in Australia, while "Revolution" topped New Zealand's singles chart for one week, following "Hey Jude"'s five-week run at number 1 there.

"Revolution 1" was released on The Beatles on 22 November 1968. It was the opening track on side four of the LP, four spots ahead of the companion piece "Revolution 9". In an interview following the album's release, Harrison said that "Revolution 1" "has less attack and not as much revolution" as the single B-side, and described it as "the Glenn Miller version". The lyric sheet included with the original LP carried the words "count me out", without the appended "in".

== Promotional film ==
Filming for promotional clips of "Hey Jude" and "Revolution" took place on 4 September 1968 under the direction of Michael Lindsay-Hogg. Two finished clips of "Revolution" were produced, with only lighting differences and other minor variations. The Beatles sang the vocals live over the pre-recorded instrumental track from the single version. Their vocals included elements from "Revolution 1": McCartney and Harrison sang the "shoo-bee-doo-wop" backing vocals, and Lennon sang "count me out – in". Authors Bruce Spizer and John Winn each describe the performance as "exciting". According to Spizer, it "combines the best elements of the album and single versions", while Hertsgaard writes that, two years after the band had retired from public performances, the clip proved that "the Beatles could rock with the best of them".

The Beatles performing in the "Revolution" film clip

Lindsay-Hogg recalled of the Beatles' approach to their promotion films: "Society was changing and music was in the vanguard. The appearance of the musicians, their clothes, hair, their way of talking was stirring the pot of social revolution." For Lennon, his absorption in a romantic and creative partnership with Ono was reflected in a change of appearance and image. In Fortnam's description, a "lean, mean demeanour" had replaced Lennon's "moptop-era puppy fat", while Hertsgaard says the clip presented him as "a serious longhair ... his center-parted locks falling down to his shoulders, and both his vocals and his subject matter further underlined how far he had traveled since the moptop days". Lindsay-Hogg recalled that before filming "Revolution", Lennon looked the worse for wear, yet he turned down a suggestion that he apply some stage makeup to make him appear healthier. Lennon reasoned, "Because I'm John Lennon" – a point Lindsay-Hogg cites as demonstrating that "They had a very different attitude to most stars. They were authentic, they weren't characters in a fiction." In the clip, Lennon plays his Epiphone Casino guitar, which he had recently stripped back from its sunburst pattern to a plain white finish. MacDonald says this gesture was partly indicative of Lennon's desire for "deglamourised frankness" and that the song inaugurates Lennon's adoption of the "stripped Casino" as a "key part of his image".

While the "Hey Jude" clip debuted on David Frost's show Frost on Sunday, on the ITV network, the "Revolution" clip was first broadcast on the BBC1 programme Top of the Pops on 19 September 1968. The first US screening of "Revolution" was on the 6 October broadcast of The Smothers Brothers Comedy Hour. The latter show was frequently subjected to censorship by its network, CBS, for its anti-establishment views, political satire and commentary on the Vietnam War. In choosing The Smothers Brothers Comedy Hour over more mainstream shows such as The Ed Sullivan Show, the Beatles ensured that their single reached an audience aligned with countercultural ideology. (Note: The "Revolution" promo clip is included in the three-disc versions, titled 1+, of the Beatles' 2015 video compilation 1.)

== Critical reception ==
In his contemporary review of the single, for Melody Maker, Chris Welch praised the A-side, saying it was a track that took several listens before its full appeal became evident, but he dismissed "Revolution" as "a fuzzy mess, and best forgotten". More impressed, Derek Johnson of the NME described "Revolution" as "unashamed rock 'n' roll" but "a cut above the average rock disc, particularly in the thoughtful and highly topical lyric", and "a track that literally shimmers with excitement and awareness". Johnson concluded by stating that the two sides "prove beyond a shadow of a doubt that the Beatles are still streets ahead of their rivals". Cash Box's reviewer described "Revolution" as "straight-out rock with lyrical flavor of a pre-Revolver feel and fifties-rock instrumentation", adding: "More commercial at first few hearings, but hardly able to stand up against 'Hey Jude.'"

Time magazine devoted an article to discussing "Revolution", the first time in the magazine's history that it had done so for a pop song. The writers said the song was "exhilarating hard rock" directed at "radical activists the world over", and that its message would "surprise some, disappoint others, and move many: cool it". Dave Marsh featured "Revolution" in his 1989 book covering the 1001 greatest singles, describing it as a "gem" with a "ferocious fuzztone rock and roll attack" and a "snarling" Lennon vocal. Writing for Rough Guides, Chris Ingham includes "Revolution" in his list of the essential Beatles songs and calls it a "remarkably cogent" statement. He says that whereas "Revolution 1" resembles a "stoned, bluesy jam", the vibrant quality of the single version "has the effect of making [Lennon's] flower-proffering pacifism a dynamic option, rather than a soporifically waved white flag". In his song review for AllMusic, Richie Unterberger calls "Revolution" one of the Beatles' "greatest, most furious rockers" with "challenging, fiery lyrics" where the listener's "heart immediately starts pounding before Lennon goes into the first verse".

In 2006, Mojo placed "Revolution" at number 16 on its list of "The 101 Greatest Beatles Songs". In his commentary for the magazine, Pete Shelley of the punk band the Buzzcocks recalled that he had never heard such distorted guitar sounds before, and hearing the song was his "eureka moment" when he decided he wanted to be in a band. The track was ranked at number 13 in a similar list compiled by Rolling Stone in 2010.

== Cultural responses ==
DASPO film of police officers dragging an anti-Vietnam War protester along the ground outside the 1968 Democratic National Convention in Chicago as the crowd chants "The whole world is watching"

Until the events of summer 1968, political activists and far left publications in the US distanced themselves from rock music and had no expectations of its relevance to their cause. According to the historian Jon Wiener, "Revolution" inspired the first "serious debate" about the connection between politics and 1960s rock music. The counterculture's reaction was especially informed by news footage of the violent scenes outside the Democratic National Convention on 28 August, and of Soviet tanks invading Czechoslovakia, which marked the return of Soviet-style communism and the end of the Prague Spring. The song prompted immediate responses from the New Left and counterculture press, most of whom expressed disappointment in the Beatles. Radicals were shocked by Lennon's use of sarcasm, his contention that things would be "all right", and his failure to engage with their plight. They also objected to his requirement for a "plan" for the revolution, when their aim was to liberate minds and ensure that all individuals entered the decision-making process as a means of personal expression. Ramparts branded the song a "betrayal" of the cause and the Berkeley Barb likened it to "the hawk plank adopted this week in the Chicago convention of the Democratic Death Party". In Britain, the New Left Review derided the song as "a lamentable petty bourgeois cry of fear", while Black Dwarf said it showed the Beatles to be "the consciousness of the enemies of the revolution". The far left contrasted "Revolution" with the Rolling Stones' concurrent single, "Street Fighting Man", which Mick Jagger had been inspired to write after attending the violent rally at Grosvenor Square in March. Despite the ambiguity in Jagger's lyrics, "Street Fighting Man" was perceived to be supportive of a radical agenda.

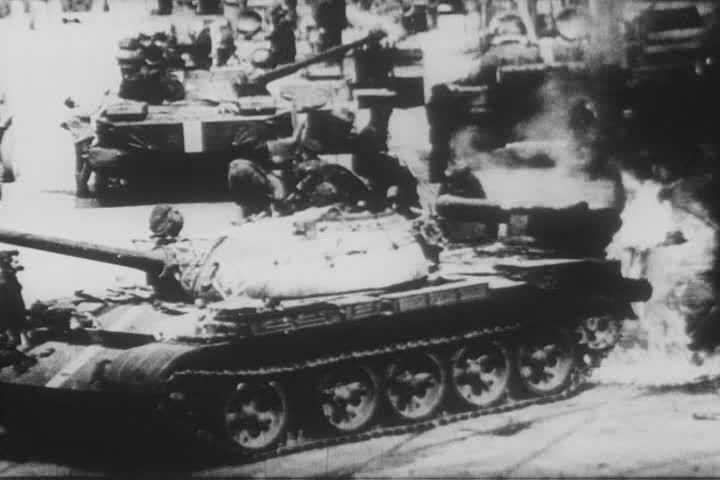
Soviet tanks in Czechoslovakia, 1968

The approval from Time magazine – a mainstream publication widely viewed as reflecting establishment views – added to the song's lack of credibility among the far left. Other commentators on the left applauded the Beatles for rejecting radicalism governed by hatred and violence, and for advocating "pacifist idealism". Among these, the New Left Students for a Democratic Society's newspaper at Cornell University stated that "You can argue about effectiveness of non-violence as a tactic, but it would be absurd to claim that it is a conservative notion ... The Beatles want to change the world, and they are doing what they can." With the release of "Revolution 1" three months after the single, some student radicals – unaware of the chronology of the recordings – welcomed the "count me out, in" lyric as a sign that Lennon had partly retracted his objection to Maoist revolution. (Note: Referring to the "mixed messages" relating to this lyric, author Devin McKinney writes that, although the Beatles were promoting the "'out' version" that appeared on the single, in their September 1968 promo clip, "John – singing directly into the camera, baring his teeth at the pivotal moment – followed 'out' with a very clearly enunciated 'in.'") According to author Mark Kurlansky, although student activists returned to their colleges after the long summer break motivated to continue the struggle, for many other people, a "feeling of weariness" supplanted their interest, and "by the end of 1968 many people agreed with the Beatles".

Among the political right, William F. Buckley Jr, an arch-conservative, wrote approvingly of the song, only to then be rebuked by the far-right John Birch Society's magazine. The magazine's editors warned that, rather than denouncing revolution, "Revolution" was urging Maoists not to "blow it all" through their impatience and was espousing a Lenin-inspired, "Moscow line". (Note: The John Birch Society paired it with McCartney's White Album track "Back in the U.S.S.R." as further evidence of the Beatles' "pro-Soviet" sentiments.) In reaction to the song and to Lennon and Ono's performance art activities, the British authorities withdrew the protection they had long afforded the Beatles as MBEs. On 18 October, Lennon and Ono were arrested on charges of drug possession; Lennon maintained he had been warned of the raid and that the drugs were planted by the arresting officers from the London Drug Squad.

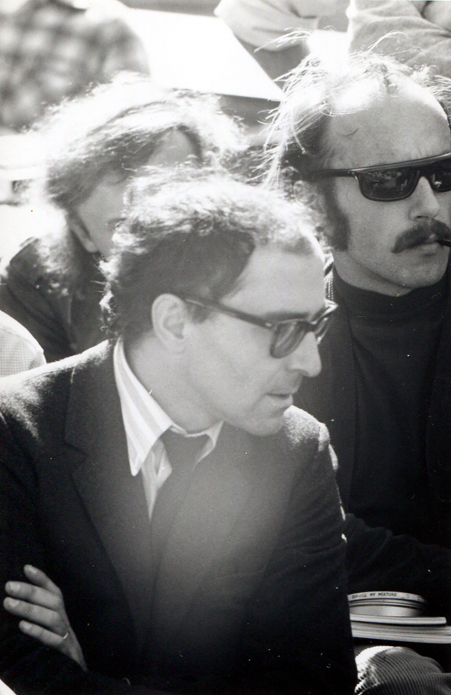
French director Jean-Luc Godard (pictured at Berkeley in 1968) was among those who attacked Lennon for his apoliticism.

Rock critics also entered the political debate over "Revolution", whereas politics had rarely been a subject of interest in their field before 1968. Greil Marcus commented that political detractors of "Revolution" had overlooked the "message" of the music, "which is more powerful than anyone's words". He added: "There is freedom and movement in the music even as there is sterility and repression in the lyrics. The music doesn't say 'cool it' or 'don't fight the cops' ... the music dodges the message and comes out in front." (Note: Marcus was demonstrating in Berkeley during the weekend of the convention in Chicago. He recalled of the contrasting messages in "Revolution" and "Street Fighting Man": "[The Beatles] were ordering us to pack up and go home, but the Stones seemed to be saying that we were lucky if we had a fight to make and a place to take a stand.") Ellen Willis of The New Yorker wrote that the Rolling Stones understood the "ambiguous relation of rock to rebellion", but "It takes a lot of chutzpah for a multimillionaire to assure the rest of us, 'You know it's gonna be all right' ... Deep within John Lennon there's a fusty old Tory struggling to get out." (Note: Writing in The Village Voice, Richard Goldstein questioned the same lyric as a statement of the Beatles' position: "For them it probably will [be all right]. But for the rest of us, those words delivered with such genial certainty must seem as consoling as a tract on the glories of national pride written in 1939.") Rolling Stone editor Jann Wenner wholeheartedly supported the Beatles, saying that any accusations of "revolutionary heresy" were "absurd", since the band were being "absolutely true to their identity as it has evolved through the last six years". In his review of the White Album, Wenner added: "Rock and roll has indeed become a style and a vehicle for changing the system. But one of the parts of the system to be changed is 'politics' and this includes 'new Left' politics."

The Beatles' apoliticism was attacked by the French film-maker Jean-Luc Godard, who had recently made the film One Plus One in London with the Rolling Stones. In an interview for International Times in September 1968, Godard said the Beatles were an example of people in Britain who had been "corrupted by money". Soon afterwards, Lennon told Jonathan Cott of Rolling Stone that this criticism was "sour grapes" on the director's part, since Godard had been unable to get the band to appear in One Plus One and so had approached the Stones. (Note: According to author Peter Doggett, the film focused on "the relationship between political power and the potency of the rock performer, and its antithesis, the emptiness of fame as a vehicle for image creation". Godard had originally wanted Lennon to play the role of Leon Trotsky.) On her arrival in London in December, the American singer Nina Simone was quoted as saying she wanted to "know what the message is" in "Revolution" so that she could perform the song effectively in concert. Instead, she wrote and recorded an answer song, also titled "Revolution", partly based on Lennon's song. In her lyrics, she challenged Lennon's statements about destruction and "the constitution", and urged him to "clean" his brain.

=== Lennon's reaction ===
The lyrics stand today ... I want to see the plan. That is what I used to say to Abbie Hoffman and Jerry Rubin. Count me out if it's for violence. Don't expect me on the barricades unless it's with flowers.

— Statement made by Lennon in 1980 about how "Revolution" still stood as an expression of his politics

Challenged on his political stance, Lennon exchanged open letters with John Hoyland, a student radical from Keele University, in the pages of Black Dwarf. Hoyland wrote the first letter in late October 1968, expecting that Lennon's drugs bust and the intolerance shown towards Ono, as a Japanese woman in Britain, would make him more sympathetic to a radical agenda. Hoyland said that "Revolution" was "no more revolutionary" than the radio soap opera Mrs Dale's Diary and criticised Lennon for continuing to espouse an ideology the Beatles had expressed in "All You Need Is Love" when, in the context of 1968, "In order to change the world we've got to understand what's wrong with the world. And then – destroy it. Ruthlessly."

Before writing a reply, Lennon met with two other students from Keele University at his home in Surrey, on 3 December. Referring to Hoyland's letter, he said that a destructive approach to societal change merely makes way for a destructive ruling power, citing the Russian and French revolutions; he also said that the Far Left's complaints demonstrated their "extremer than thou" snobbery and their inability to form a united movement, adding that if radicals of that calibre did lead a revolution, he and the Rolling Stones would "probably be the first ones they'll shoot ... And it's him – it's the guy that wrote the letter that'll do it, you know." In his letter published in Black Dwarf on 10 January 1969, Lennon countered that Hoyland was "on a destruction kick" and challenged him to name a single revolution that had achieved its aims. Lennon closed the letter with a postscript saying, "You smash it – and I'll build around it." The exchange, which included a second letter from Hoyland, was syndicated internationally in the underground press. Oz editor Richard Neville later described it as "a classic New Left/psychedelic Left dialogue".

Lennon was stung by the criticism he received from the New Left. Having campaigned for world peace with Ono throughout 1969, he began to embrace radical politics after undergoing primal therapy in 1970. In a conversation with British activist Tariq Ali in January 1971, he said of "Revolution": "I made a mistake, you know. The mistake was that it was anti-revolution." (Note: In his Rolling Stone interview with Wenner, later published in book form as Lennon Remembers, he said: "I really thought ... that love would save us all. But now I'm wearing a Chairman Mao badge, so that's where it's at.") Lennon then wrote "Power to the People" to atone for the perceived apathy of "Revolution", and instead sang: "You say you want a revolution / We better get it on right away." After moving to New York in 1971, he and Ono fully embraced radical politics with Chicago Seven defendants Jerry Rubin and Abbie Hoffman. By 1972, he had also changed his mind about his rebuke of Mao Zedong, saying: "I should have never said that about Chairman Mao." Lennon abandoned the cause following Richard Nixon's victory in the 1972 presidential election and he subsequently denounced revolutionaries and radical politics as useless. In the final interview he gave before his murder in December 1980, Lennon reaffirmed the pacifist message of "Revolution", saying he still wished to "see the plan" for any proposed revolution. With reference to Lennon's comments in this interview, MacDonald wrote in 1994: "Tiananmen Square, the ignominious collapse of Soviet communism, and the fact that most of his radical persecutors of 1968–70 now work in advertising have belatedly served to confirm his original instincts."

== Subsequent releases and use in Nike advertisement ==
"Revolution" made its LP debut on the 1970 US compilation album Hey Jude, which was also the first time that the track was available in stereo. The stereo mix was carried out on 5 December 1969, supervised by Martin. The song was subsequently issued on the Beatles compilations 1967–1970 and Past Masters, Volume Two. (Note: "Revolution" was remixed for the 2006 soundtrack album Love, appearing in full length on the DVD-Audio version and as a shortened edit on the CD release.) Lennon disliked the stereo mix used on 1967–1970, saying in a 1974 interview that "Revolution" was a "heavy record" in mono but "then they made it into a piece of ice cream!" The song was included as the opening track of the Beatles' 2012 iTunes compilation Tomorrow Never Knows, which the band's website described as a collection of "the Beatles' most influential rock songs".

In 1987, "Revolution" became the first Beatles recording to be licensed for use in a television commercial. (Note: A cover version of "Help!" had been used in 1985 in a Lincoln–Mercury commercial. Other artists' recordings of "She Loves You" and "We Can Work It Out" had also been used that year in commercials for Schweppes' Spanish subsidiary and Hewlett-Packard, respectively.) Nike paid $500,000 for the right to use the song for one year, split between recording owner Capitol-EMI and song publisher ATV Music Publishing (owned by Michael Jackson). Commercials using the song started airing in March 1987.

The three surviving Beatles, through Apple Corps, filed a lawsuit in July objecting to Nike's use of the song. The suit was aimed at Nike, its advertising agency Wieden+Kennedy, and Capitol-EMI Records. Capitol-EMI said the lawsuit was groundless because they had licensed the use of "Revolution" with the "active support and encouragement of Yoko Ono Lennon, a shareholder and director of Apple". Ono had expressed approval when the ad was released, saying it was "making John's music accessible to a new generation". Fans were outraged at Nike's appropriation of the song and incensed at Jackson and Ono for allowing the Beatles' work to be commercially exploited in this way. Ono said that McCartney had agreed to the deal, a claim that McCartney denied. Harrison commented in an interview for Musician magazine:

Well, from our point of view, if it's allowed to happen, every Beatles song ever recorded is going to be advertising women's underwear and sausages. We've got to put a stop to it in order to set a precedent. Otherwise it's going to be a free-for-all ... It's one thing when you're dead, but we're still around! They don't have any respect for the fact that we wrote and recorded those songs, and it was our lives.

The "Revolution" lawsuit and others involving the Beatles and EMI were settled out of court in November 1989, with the terms kept secret. The financial website TheStreet.com included the Nike "Revolution" advertisement campaign in its list of the 100 key business events of the 20th century, as it helped "commodify dissent".

== Cover versions ==
=== Thompson Twins ===
"Revolution"

Single by Thompson Twins

from the album Here's to Future Days
- B-side: "The Fourth Sunday"
- Released: 29 November 1985
- Length: 5:20
- Label: Arista
- Songwriter: Lennon–McCartney
- Producers: Nile Rodgers; Tom Bailey

Thompson Twins singles chronology
"King for a Day" (1985)	"Revolution" (1985)	"Nothing in Common" (1986)

The English pop band Thompson Twins recorded "Revolution" for their fifth studio album Here's to Future Days (1985), which was co-produced by Nile Rodgers. On 13 July that year, in advance of the album's release, the band performed the song with Rodgers, Madonna and guitarist Steve Stevens at the concert held at JFK Stadium in Philadelphia that formed the US part of Live Aid. The concert was watched by a television audience estimated at 1.5 billion and raised $80 million for African famine relief. In a 2017 interview, Thompson Twins singer Tom Bailey said that, having grown up in the 1960s when music was "about social change and making the world a better place", he now believed that it had become "tamed by the corporate world" and Live Aid represented "the last great moment of rock and roll fist waving for change".

"Revolution" was one of three tracks on Here's to Future Days to feature Stevens on guitar and was first released in September 1985. It was subsequently issued as a single, backed by the non-album instrumental "The Fourth Sunday". The band made a promotional video for the single, directed by Meiert Avis. The song peaked at number 56 on the UK Singles Chart, spending five weeks on the chart. In 2004, the Live Aid performance of the song was included on the four-disc DVD release from the event.

=== Stone Temple Pilots ===
"Revolution"

Single by Stone Temple Pilots
- Released: November 27, 2001
- Recorded: November 2001
- Length: 3:39
- Label: Atlantic
- Songwriter: Lennon–McCartney
- Producer: Stone Temple Pilots

Stone Temple Pilots singles chronology
"Hollywood Bitch" (2001)	"Revolution" (2001)	"All in the Suit That You Wear" (2003)

In October 2001, the rock band Stone Temple Pilots performed "Revolution" live during Come Together: A Night for John Lennon's Words and Music, a television special in tribute to Lennon that raised funds for victims of the September 11 attacks on the World Trade Center. Singer Scott Weiland said that the band had selected the song while on tour in Europe, several weeks before Come Together; he added: "Our real decision for picking 'Revolution' was simply because it rocks." After their performance received considerable radio airplay, Stone Temple Pilots recorded a studio version of the song, which was released as a single on 27 November 2001. The song also appeared as a b-side to the band's previous single "Hollywood Bitch". The single reached number 30 on the US Mainstream Rock Tracks chart, was the 77th best-selling single in Canada for 2002, and the 90th best in 2001.

=== Other artists ===
Along with White Album tracks such as "Revolution 9", "Helter Skelter" and "Piggies", "Revolution 1" was interpreted by Californian cult leader Charles Manson as a prophecy of an upcoming apocalyptic racial war between the establishment and the Black community that would leave him and his followers, the Manson Family, to rule America on counterculture principles. In an attempt to initiate this revolution, the Family carried out a series of murders in Los Angeles in August 1969. For the soundtrack of the 1976 TV film Helter Skelter, "Revolution 1" was performed by the band Silverspoon.

"Revolution" has also been covered by Anima Sound System, Billy Bragg, the Brothers Four, Enuff Z'nuff, Jools Holland, Kajsa Grytt, Kenny Neal, Reckless Kelly, Hawksley Workman, Stereophonics, Jim Sturgess, Running Wild, Joe Perry, Billy Gibbons, Trixter, and Def Leppard. In 2007, a cover version of the song was featured in the Universal comedy Evan Almighty performed by country rock band Rascal Flatts.

== Personnel ==
According to Ian MacDonald, the line-ups on the Beatles' recordings were as follows:

=== "Revolution" ===
The Beatles

- John Lennon – vocals, lead guitar, handclaps
- Paul McCartney – bass guitar, Hammond organ, handclaps
- George Harrison – lead guitar, handclaps
- Ringo Starr – drums, handclaps

Additional musician

- Nicky Hopkins – electric piano

=== "Revolution 1" ===
The Beatles

- John Lennon – lead vocals, acoustic guitar, lead guitar
- Paul McCartney – bass guitar, piano, Hammond organ, backing vocals
- George Harrison – lead guitar, backing vocals
- Ringo Starr – drums

Additional musicians

- Derek Watkins, Freddy Clayton – trumpets
- Don Lang, Rex Morris, J. Power, Bill Povey – trombones
- George Martin – brass arrangement

== Chart performance ==
=== Beatles version ===
Chart (1968–1969)	Peak position
Australian Go-Set National Top 40	1
Belgium (Ultratop 50 Wallonia)	1
Italy (Musica e dischi)	37
New Zealand Listener Chart	1
US Billboard Hot 100	12
US Cash Box Top 100	11
US Record World 100 Top Pops	2

== Certifications ==
Certifications for "Revolution"
Region	Certification	Certified units/sales
United Kingdom (BPI)	Silver	200,000^{‡}
^{‡} Sales+streaming figures based on certification alone.

=== Thompson Twins version ===
Chart (1985)	Peak position
New Zealand Singles Chart	43
UK Singles Chart	56

=== Stone Temple Pilots version ===
Chart (2001)	Peak position
US Mainstream Rock (Billboard)	30
