= Days of the Week (song) =

2001 single by Stone Temple Pilots

Single by Stone Temple Pilots

from the album Shangri-La Dee Da
- Released: June 5, 2001
- Recorded: January–April 2001
- Genre: Power pop; glam rock
- Length: 2:35
- Label: Atlantic
- Composer: Dean DeLeo
- Lyricist: Scott Weiland
- Producer: Brendan O'Brien

Stone Temple Pilots singles chronology
"Break On Through (to the Other Side)" (2000)	"Days of the Week" (2001)	"Hollywood Bitch" (2001)

Audio sample
- file; help

Music video
- "Days of the Week" on YouTube

"Days of the Week" is a song by American rock band Stone Temple Pilots, released as the lead single from their fifth studio album, Shangri-La Dee Da, in June 2001. Despite being a top-five hit on two US Billboard charts, the song did not become a regular part of the band's set list. The last time it was performed in any aspect was a partial performance of the song on November 13, 2001, and the last time the song was played in full was on November 3, 2001. The later appeared on the band's compilation albums Thank You and Buy This.

== Composition ==
The song's lyrics were written by vocalist Scott Weiland about how his heroin addiction affected his relationship with his second wife Mary Forsberg. The song's music was written by guitarist Dean DeLeo and has a much poppier sound than most of the band's previous singles.

== Music video ==
The music video depicts two STPs: one dressed up in white shirts and ties going door-to-door like salesmen or possibly missionaries, and the other taking a journey through space.

== Charts ==
=== Weekly charts ===
Chart (2001)	Peak position
Canada Radio (BDS)	20
Canada Rock (BDS)	9
UK Singles (OCC)	118
UK Rock & Metal (Official Charts)	7
US Bubbling Under Hot 100 (Billboard)	1
US Alternative Airplay (Billboard)	5
US Mainstream Rock (Billboard)	4

=== Year-end charts ===
Chart (2001)	Position
US Mainstream Rock Tracks (Billboard)	44
US Modern Rock Tracks (Billboard)	48

== Release history ==
Region	Date	Format(s)	Label(s)	Ref.
United States	June 5, 2001	Mainstream rock; active rock; alternative radio	Atlantic	
United States	July 23, 2001	Hot adult contemporary radio	Atlantic	
United States	July 23, 2001	Contemporary hit radio	Atlantic	
United Kingdom	September 10, 2001	CD; cassette	Atlantic	
