= Arise Awake Park =

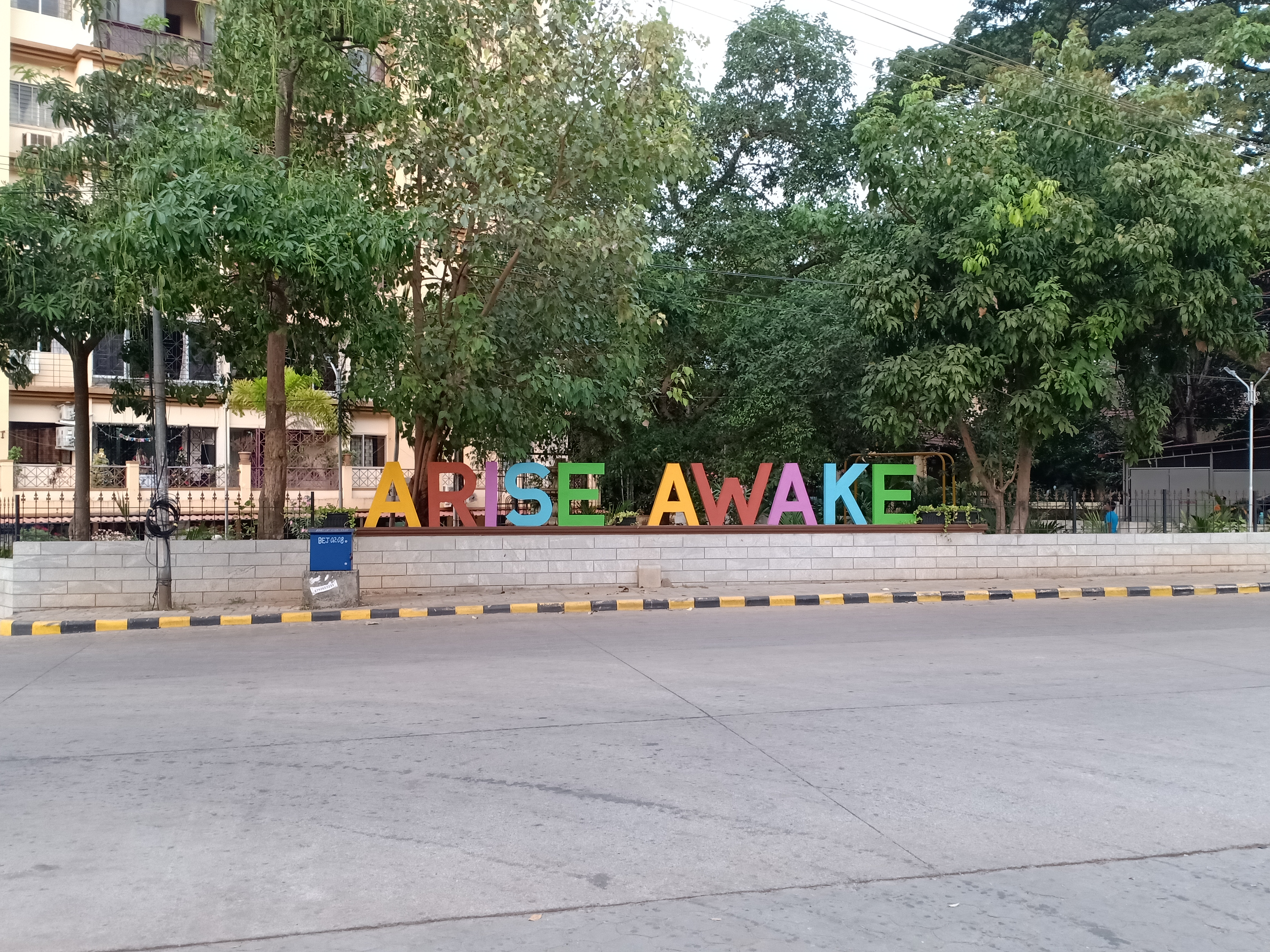
- Near the entrance of the Arise Awake Park in Mangalore

- Location at Mangalore
- Coordinates: 12°50′23″N 74°47′28″E
- Country: India
- State: Karnataka
- District: Dakshina Kannada
- City: Mangalore
- Founded: 2018
- Founder: Ramakrishna Mission

Government
  - Body: Mangalore City Corporation

Arise Awake Park is a recreation park in Mangalore city of Karnataka state in India. It comprises a water fountain with LED, garden and lawn. It also contains a 220-foot-long acupressure track created using round pebbles. This park which was earlier known as Lions Park was renovated by the Ramakrishna Mission to mark the completion of 20 weeks of cleanliness drive in Mangalore. It is situated at Karangalpady locality of Mangalore.

== Gallery ==
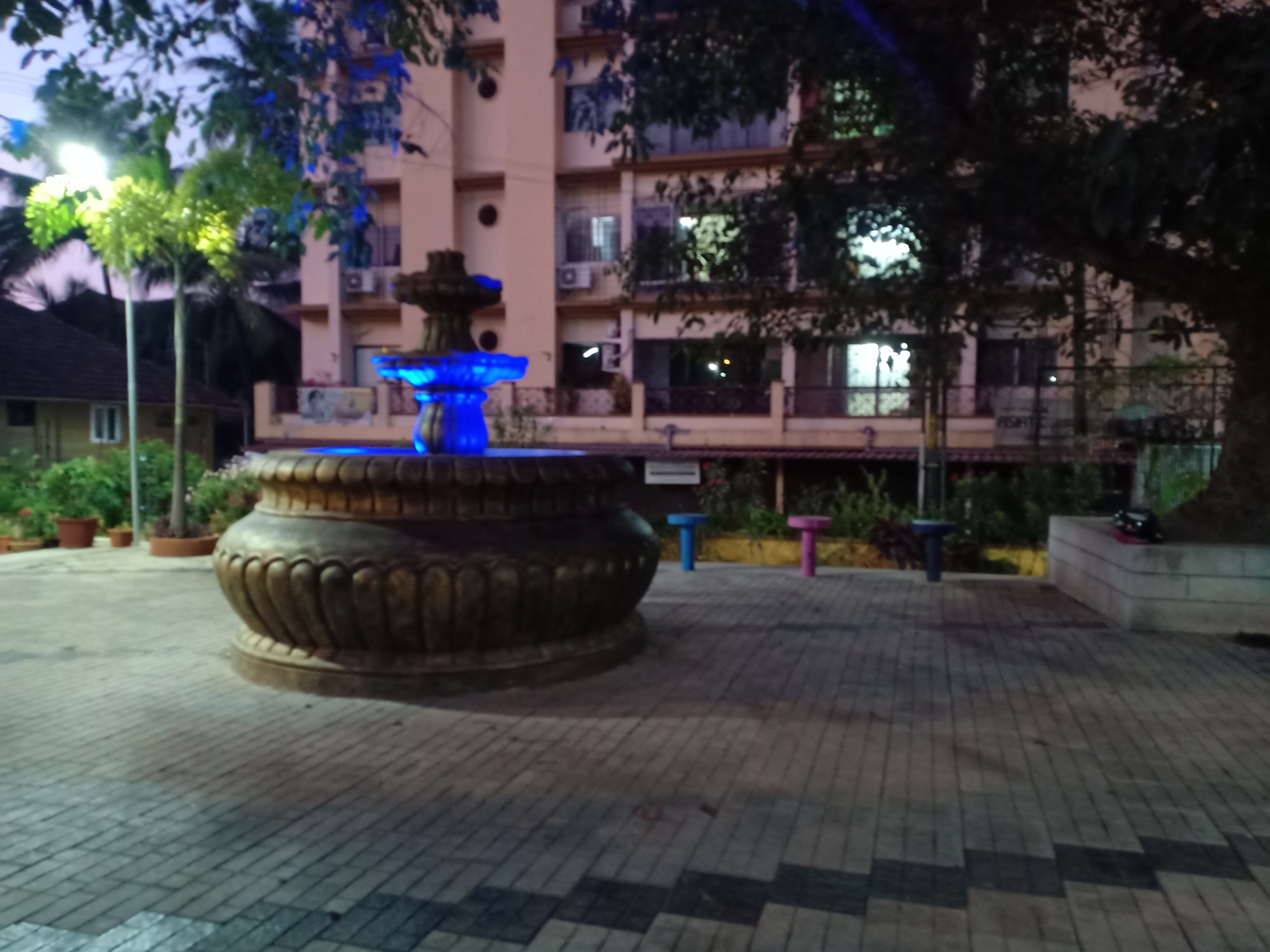
Arise Awake Park - LED Fountain

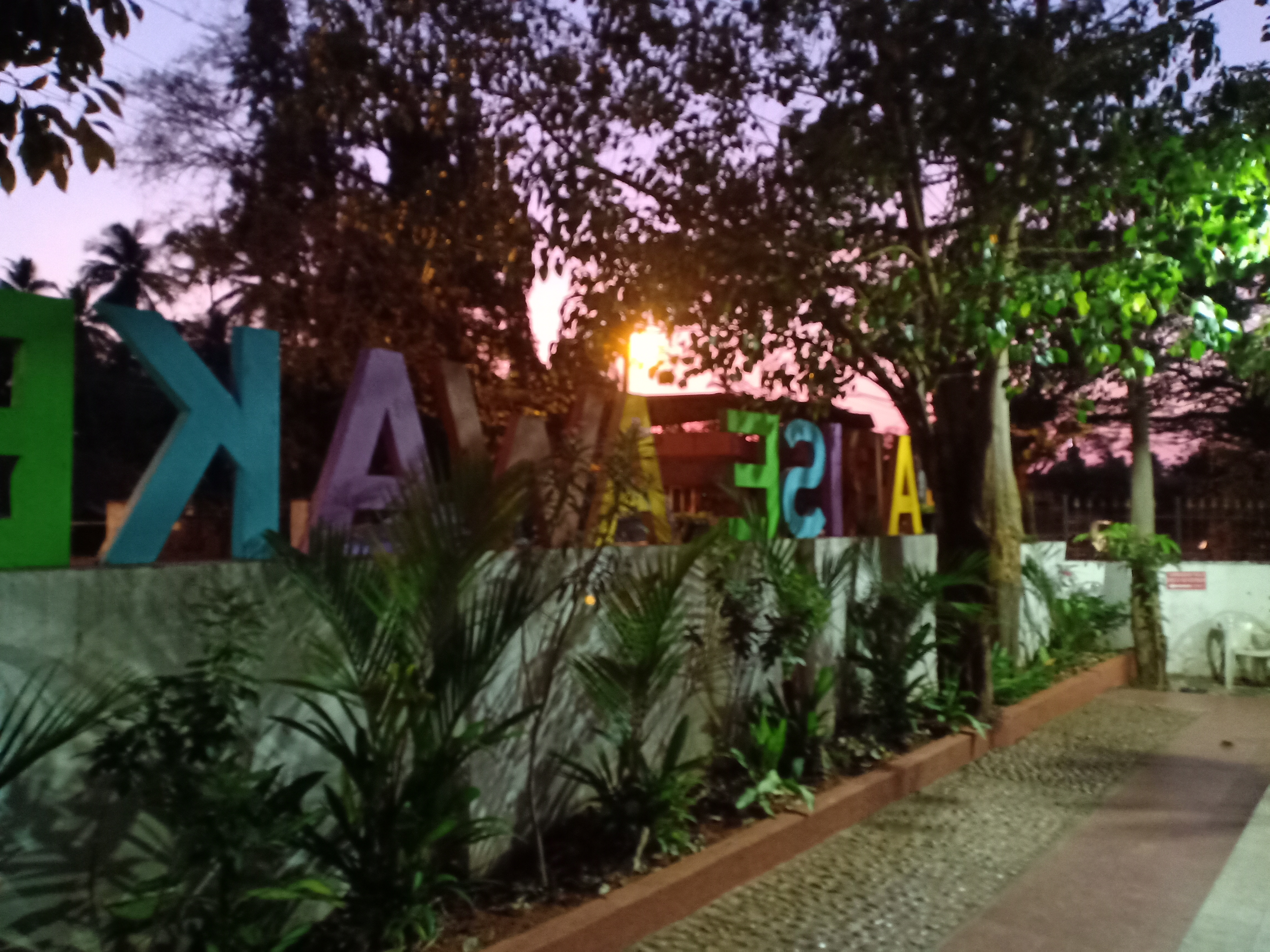
Arise Awake Park - Garden

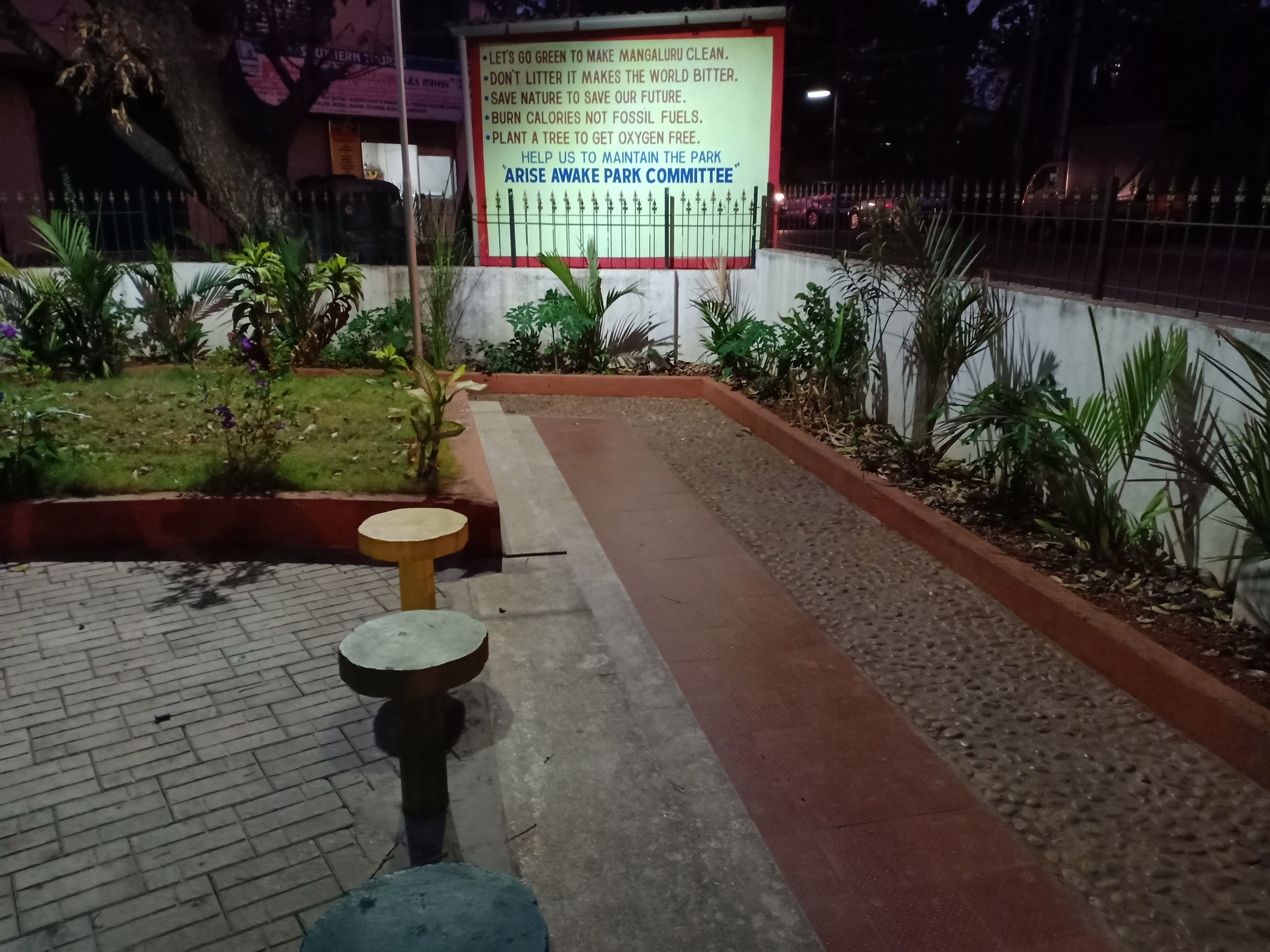
Arise Awake Park - Acupressure track and Placard
