= Banos =

Banos or Baños (Spanish: baths) may refer to:

- Jean-Paul Banos (born 1961), Canadian fencer
- Banos, Landes, a commune in the Landes department of France
- Baños de Agua Santa, a city in Tungurahua Province, Ecuador
- Baños Canton, Ecuador, of which Baños de Agua Santa is the capital
- Baños District, Peru
- Baños, Azuay, a suburb of Cuenca, Ecuador
- Los Baños, Laguna, a municipality known for its hot spring resorts in the Laguna province of the Philippines.

See also

- Baños de Ebro
- Baños de la Encina
- Baños de Molgas
- Baños de Montemayor
- Baños de Tajo
- Baños de Valdearados
- Battle of Puerto de Baños
