= Al-Abbas ibn Amr al-Ghanawi =

Abbasid military officer (died 917)

Al-'Abbas ibn 'Amr al-Ghanawi (Arabic: العباس بن عمرو الغنوي; died 917) was an Arab military commander and provincial governor for the Abbasid dynasty. He is known for his defeat and capture at the hands of the Qarmatians in 900.

== Life ==
Al-'Abbas was likely born in the Diyar Mudar district of al-Jazira. He embarked on a military career in the service of the Abbasids and is first recorded as one of the officers in charge of an expedition sent against unruly Arab tribes in Iraq in 899. In the following year he was appointed by the caliph al-Mu'tadid as governor of al-Bahrain and al-Yamamah and tasked with driving the Qarmatians led by Abu Sa'id Jannabi out of the region. Since the Qarmatians had already successfully occupied much of al-Bahrain, including al-Qatif, al-'Abbas assembled an army of regular soldiers, bedouin fighters and volunteers before departing from al-Basra for the province.

Shortly after their departure, al-'Abbas and his army met the Qarmatians and engaged them in battle. The first day of fighting ended in a standstill, but in the evening the bedouins and volunteers abandoned the campaign and returned to al-Basra. The following morning, the two armies resumed fighting, and al-'Abbas's depleted forces were routed; he and seven hundred of his men were compelled to surrender. The day after the battle, Abu Sa'id ordered that the captured soldiers all be put to death; al-'Abbas alone was spared and was eventually released, with instructions to warn al-Mu'tadid of the futility in opposing the Qarmatians. He returned to Iraq and was rewarded by al-Mu'tadid for his efforts.

Following his failed campaign, al-'Abbas remained in military service, and in 902 he was in Fars serving under Badr al-Mu'tadidi, the commander-in-chief of the army. When Badr fell out of favor with the new caliph al-Muktafi, al-'Abbas was one of several commanders who complied with the caliph's order to abandon the general and return to Baghdad. He was subsequently made governor of Qom and Kashan in 908–9, and he may have been a member of the campaign led by Mu'nis al-Khadim to defend Egypt against the Fatimids in 914–5. His last post was as governor of the Diyar Mudar, and he died there in 917. He was succeeded as governor by Wasif ibn al-Buktamiri following his death.
