= Benu Dasgupta =

Indian cricketer (1928–2010)

Ashok Kumar (Benu) Dasgupta (7 March 1928 – 21 April 2010) was an Indian cricketer. He was active during the 1950s and played for the Bengal and Bihar cricket teams.

Dasgupta was one of the main pillars of Bengal's batting in 1950s and recipient of Kartick Bose Lifetime Achievement Award from The Cricket Association of Bengal in July 2008.

== Career ==
Dasgupta was right-handed batsman and a right-arm medium pace bowler. He appeared with the Bengal cricket team from the 1952/53 season through the 1955/56 season, and played one final season (1956/56) with the Bihar cricket team.

=== Record ===
First class batting and fielding career

	M	I	NO	Runs	HS	Ave	100	50	Ct
Overall	18	33	6	778	104	28.81	1	3	14

First class bowling career

	Balls	Mdns	Runs	Wkts	BB	Ave	5wI	10wM	SRate	Econ
Overall	884	42	403	16	4-22	25.18	0	0	55.25	2.73

== Personal ==
Dasgupta was born to Shrimati Saibolini Dasgupta and Shri Jitendra Nath Dasgupta (former Chairman of Calcutta Improvement Trust, Founder member of B.E.College of Engineering and an active member of Jadavpur University). He completed his schooling from South Suburban School in South Calcutta. He completed his high school from Ashutosh College. He was a mechanical engineer, a student of Jadavpur University. He worked with Gannon Dunkerly & Co. PVT. LTD.

Married to Shrimati Pranati Dasgupta.

Dasgupta was brother to two other Bengali cricketers of the 1950s: Anil Kumar Dasgupta and Ajit Kumar Dasgupta .
