= Bhanu, Nepal =

Bhanu from Nellore district Gudur

Bhanu, Nepal भानु
- subdivision of Bhanu Municipality
- Location in Nepal Bhanu, Nepal (Nepal)
- Coordinates: 28.02°N 84.43°E
- Country: Nepal
- Zone: Gandaki Zone
- District: Tanahu District

Government
  - Mayor: Ananda Raj Tripathi (NC)
  - Deputy Mayor: Uma Gotame (NC)

Population (2011)
  - Total: 13,175
- Time zone: UTC+5:45 (Nepal Time)
- Website: http://bhanumun.gov.np

Bhanu, Nepal is a former village development committee (VDC) in Tanahun District in the Gandaki Zone of western Nepal and now part of Bhanu Municipality. At the time of the 2011 Nepal census the VDC had a population of 13175 in 3476 households.
