= Bangui (disambiguation) =

Bangui is the capital of and the largest city in the Central African Republic.

Bangui may also refer to:

- Bangui, Niger
- Bangui, Ilocos Norte, Philippines
- Bangui (Prefecture), a newly established prefecture in the Central African Republic in December 2020
- Antoine Bangui (1933–2026), Chadian political figure and author

== See also ==
- Banjul, the capital of The Gambia
