= Florentin Banu =

Romanian businessman

Florentin Banu is a business man from Timișoara. In 1994 he created the "Joe" waffles (his nickname from childhood) which he sold in 2000 to Nestlé.

With his earnings from this transaction he founded in 2001 the supermarket network Artima. He sold it in 2005 to the investment fund Enterprise Investors and later acquired by Carrefour.

After that with his brother Daniel Banu he created BanuInvest group that created Banuconstruct, Banusport and Interpart Production.
