= Benow (company) =

South Korea skincare and beauty brand

- Type: Private
- Founded: 2018; 8 years ago
- Founders: Lee Il-joo; Kim Dae-young
- Headquarters: Seoul, South Korea
- Area served: Worldwide
- Products: Cosmetics; Skin care
- Revenue: ▲KRW 266.4 brillion (2025)
- Net income: ▲KRW 75.1 billion (2025)
- Website: www.benow.co.kr/ko/home

Benow (Korean: 비나우) is a South Korean cosmetics and personal care conglomerate. The company's focus is on basic K-beauty skincare products. It operates a number of brands, including Numbuzin, Fwee, Knock, Flaskin, and Riah. As of 2026, the company is planning an initial public offering on the KOSPI, having appointed Samsung Securities as its underwriter in September 2024.

The company has an office in Shinjuku I-Land Tower, Tokyo.

== History ==
Benow was founded in 2018 by co-CEOs Lee Il-joo and Kim Dae-young, both alumni of Seoul National University and former employees at Amorepacific Corporation.

In 2019, the company launched its flagship brand Numbuzin. Its products have been popular on TikTok, alongside the growth of the K-beauty industry.

In 2025, it attained unicorn status.

In November 2025, the company launched Knock, a body care brand that applies skincare formulations to products such as body toners, body washes and body scrubs.
