= Bonu, Sistan and Baluchestan =

Bonu بنو
- Village
- Location within Iran
- Coordinates: 25°40′15″N 60°57′06″E
- Country: Iran
- Province: Sistan and Baluchestan
- County: Chabahar
- Bakhsh: Central
- Rural District: Pir Sohrab

Population (2006)
  - Total: 243
- Time zone: UTC+3:30 (IRST)
  - Summer (DST): UTC+4:30 (IRDT)

Bonu (Persian: بنو, also Romanized as Bonū and Bon Now; also known as Būnnā and Būnnū) is a village in Pir Sohrab Rural District, in the Central District of Chabahar County, Sistan and Baluchestan Province, Iran. At the 2006 census, its population was 243, in 41 families.
