= Monte Bano =

Mountain in Italy

- Location within Italy

Highest point
- Elevation: 1,035 m (3,396 ft)
- Prominence: 143 m (469 ft)
- Coordinates: 44°30′N 9°03′E

Geography
- Location: Liguria, Italy
- Parent range: Ligurian Apennines

Monte Bano is a mountain in Liguria, northern Italy, part of the Ligurian Apennines. It is located in the province of Genoa. It lies at an altitude of 1035 metres.
