= Iksaka Banu =

Indonesian writer (born 1964)

Iksaka Banu (born October 7, 1964 in Yogyakarta) is an Indonesian writer of comics and prose. His work has featured in a variety of Indonesian mass media. In 2008 and 2009 he won Pena Kencana Awards and in 2014 he was a recipient of a Khatulistiwa Literary Award for a collection of short stories titled "Semua Untuk Hindia".
