= Fatima Bano =

Indian wrestler

Fatima Bano is a female wrestling coach from Bhopal, Madhya Pradesh, India.

Born in a Muslim family, Fatima Bano started her career in sports by playing Kabaddi, in which she won three national medals. She was the born to Syed Nasrulla who worked in BHL and her mother Nisha Bane was a housewife. She became the first Muslim woman coach of the country to raise the strength of 20 players at the international level at her own expense. She has also trained Geeta-Babita Phogat and Sakshi Malik. Currently, she is teaching 27 students which comprise 12 girls and 15 boys for the Olympic games.

In 1997, as advised by her Kabaddi coach, she went to Patiala, Punjab and got trained as a wrestler. Under the guidance of her coach, Shakir Noor, she participated in various national and international wrestling championships and won awards.

In 2003, she started her wrestling ring in Bhopal in a land given by the government. She was also given Four thousand Indian rupees as a monthly salary. She coaches children and teenagers – boys and girls. She also trained players from United States, Kazakhstan and Kyrgyzstan.

In 2001, Fatima Bano was presented with Vikram Award, the highest honour in sports given by the government of the state of Madhya Pradesh. She was the first wrestler to achieve this position.
