= Baños de Tajo =

Baños de Tajo, Spain
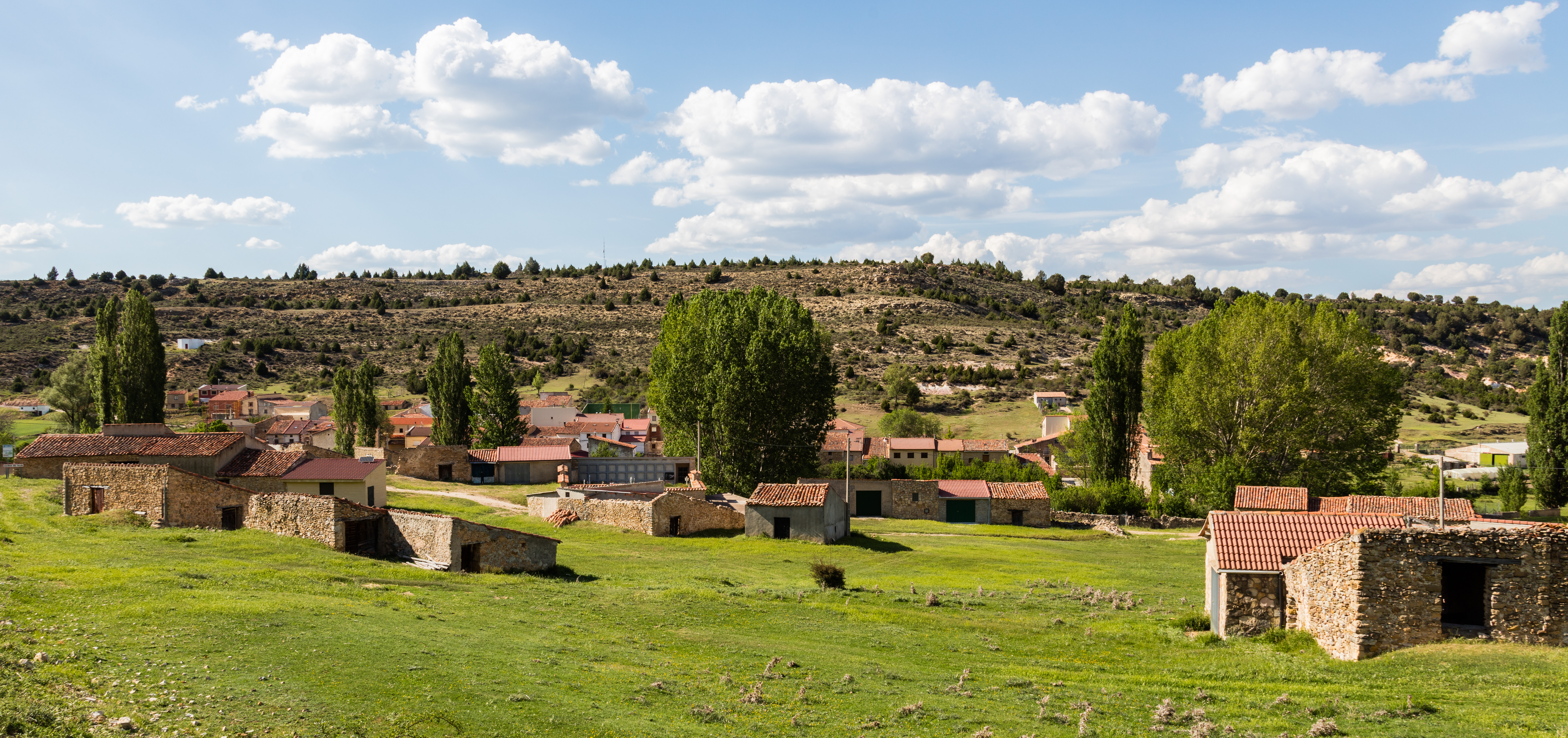

- Location within Province of Guadalajara Location within Castilla-La Mancha Location within Spain
- Coordinates: 40°43′11″N 1°58′12″W
- Country: Spain
- Autonomous community: Castile-La Mancha
- Province: Guadalajara
- Municipality: Baños de Tajo

Area
  - Total: 28 km^{2} (11 sq mi)

Population (2025-01-01)
  - Total: 13
  - Density: 0.46/km^{2} (1.2/sq mi)
- Time zone: UTC+1 (CET)
  - Summer (DST): UTC+2 (CEST)

Baños de Tajo is a municipality located in the province of Guadalajara, Castile-La Mancha, Spain. According to the 2004 census (INE), the municipality has a population of 29 inhabitants.
