= Azad Peroz =

7th century Iranian nobleman

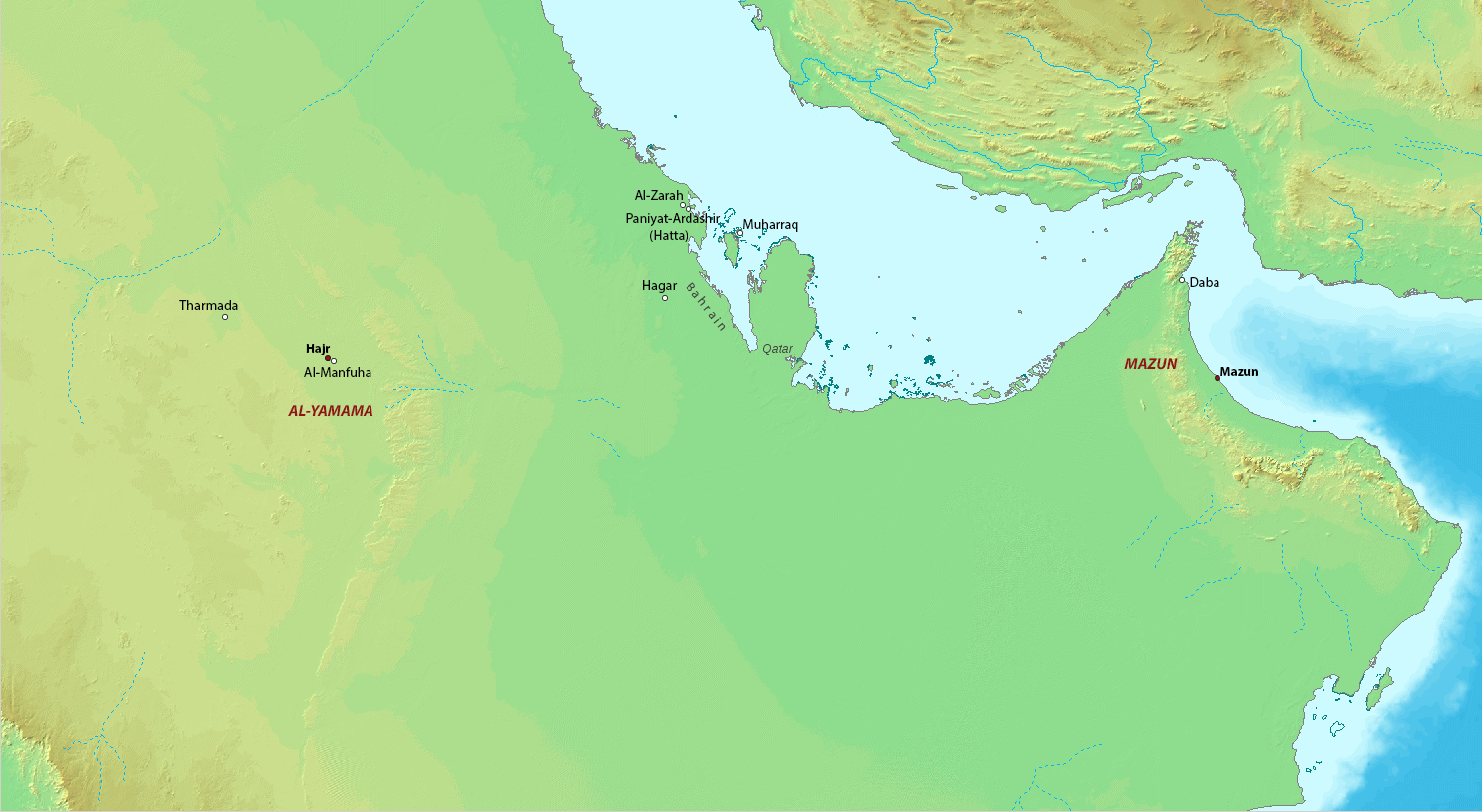
Map of eastern and central Arabia.

Azad Peroz, known in Arabic sources as Azad Firuz, was an Iranian nobleman who served as the governor of the Sasanian province of Mazun during the reign of king (shah) Khosrow II (r. 590–628). He was the son of a certain Gushnasp, and was given the nickname of muka'bir ("the mutilating") by the Arabs, because he cut the hands and feet of other people.

According to a tradition, a caravan of gifts sent by the Sasanian governor Vahriz to Khosrow II was attacked by the Banu Yarbu tribe. Khosrow II then ordered the governor of Mazun, Azad Peroz, to punish the tribe. In order to do that, Azad Peroz invited the Banu Yarbu tribe to the Mushakkar Castle in Hajar, where he killed everyone except the boys, who were sent in captivity to Estakhr in Pars.

During the rise of Islam, Azad Peroz converted to the religion and died during the reign of Caliph Umar (r. 634–644).

== Notes ==
a: According to Tafazzoli, Azad Peroz ruled an area consisting of Bahrain (Eastern Arabia) and its surroundings, which corresponds to the province of Mazun.

== Sources ==
- Tafazzoli, A. (1987). "Azād Fīrūz". Encyclopaedia Iranica, Vol. III, Fasc. 2. p. 173.
