= Bannu Biradari =

Bannu Biradari or All India Bannu Biradari is the community organisation of Hindus who migrated from Bannu district of Northwest Frontier Province to India after partition of India in 1947. It consists of 11 trusts.

- Bannu Biradari Bhawan Trust
- Faridabad Bannu Biradari
- Bannu Biradari Bhawan Kanpur
- Dehradun
- Lucknow
- Bareily
- Rampur
- Bannu Biradari Kotdwara
- Vrindavan Bannu Biradari Trust
- Haridwar Bannu Biradari Bhawan Trust
