= Bianhu =

Bianhu (Chinese: 編戶齊民; pinyin: biān hù qí mín) was a system of household registration introduced following the Qin unification in 221 BC. The system transformed individual households into a category labelled the "common people listed in the household register".
