= Yabrin =

Coordinates: 23.263°N 48.981°E

Yabrin is a settlement in Saudi Arabia 130 miles (210 km) south of Riyadh, within the Eastern Region. The closest town is Haradh.

The area was an important crossing point and oasis town in caravan routes to Oman as early as the third millennium BCE. A large number of burial mounds dating to the late third millennium BCE have been found at Yabrin, with morphologies suggesting a connection to the Dilmun Burial Mounds in Bahrain.

The Yabrin oasis was historically noted for its position as the southern-most habitable point from Nejd at the northern edge of the Rub' al Khali, and for its date production. The town was considered abandoned by the early modern era. In the 1940s it began to be resettled by Bedouins mostly with a Dawasir background.

The economy is agricultural in nature with date orchards and waterwheel irrigation crop circles. The area is located in an area with natural water resources as opposed to the more common, central pivot irrigation projects sustained by desalinated ocean water from the Red Sea or Persian Gulf.
