= Bangu =

Bangu may refer to:

- Bangladeshi, It is a peculiar slang used by Bangladeshi people to refer to fellow Bangladeshis who express ideologies through their political beliefs. Sometimes, it refers to uneducated political followers who have no vision or don't understand any.
- Bamileke, a Semi-Bantu ethnic group of people from Cameroon
- Bangu (neighborhood), a district of Rio de Janeiro, Brazil
- Bangu (drum), a Chinese percussion instrument
- Bangu Atlético Clube, a football team in Bangu, Rio de Janeiro
- SS Bangu a cargo ship built as Ophis in 1919 and later known as Empire Antelope

== See also ==
- Ban Gu, a Chinese historian of Han dynasty
- Bân gú, a group of Chinese dialects
- Bangus, Filipino for "Milkfish"
- Bangui (disambiguation)
