= Benow, Larestan =

Benow بنو
- Village
- Location within Iran
- Coordinates: 27°29′52″N 53°58′18″E
- Country: Iran
- Province: Fars
- County: Larestan
- Bakhsh: Sahray-ye Bagh
- Rural District: Sahray-ye Bagh

Population (2006)
  - Total: 110
- Time zone: UTC+3:30 (IRST)
  - Summer (DST): UTC+4:30 (IRDT)

Benow (Persian: بنو, also Romanized as Banoo and Banū; also known as Konārdān) is a village in Sahray-ye Bagh Rural District, Sahray-ye Bagh District, Larestan County, Fars province, Iran. At the 2006 census, its population was 110, in 19 families.
