= Ibn Banu =

Ibn Banu (Arabic: ابن بانوا) was the nominal governor of al-Bahrain for the Abbasid dynasty, serving there in 903.

== Career ==
The Muslim historian al-Tabari's Annals only mentions Ibn Banu once. He appears to have been a military commander who was posted to al-Bahrain in an attempt to expel the Qarmatians under Abu Sa'id Jannabi there. He is recorded as having sent a message to the central government in Baghdad, describing how he had launched a surprise attack on a Qarmatian stronghold and successfully overwhelmed its defenders. In October 903 another message was received from him, stating that he had attacked al-Qatif. His troops routed the Qarmatians and killed their commander, who was identified as Abu Sa'id's designated successor. They then prevailed against al-Qatif and entered it.

Ibn Banu is not subsequently mentioned, but the Abbasid reconquest of al-Qatif was short-lived, as the Qarmatians were soon back in control of the oasis.
