= Praveen Kumar (Mangalore politician) =

Indian politician

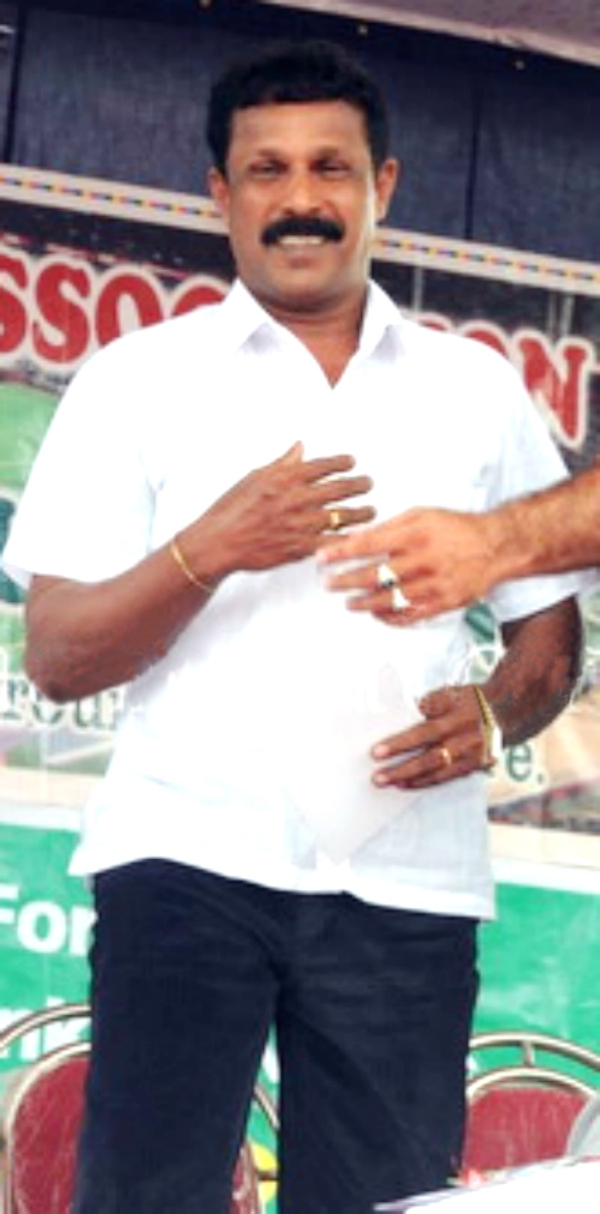

Praveen Kumar an Indian politician and former Mayor of Mangalore City Corporation. He was elected into office on 28 February 2011, with Geetha N. Nayak as Deputy Mayor. He is the 25th person to have become mayor of the city corporation, since its establishment in 1984. Kumar is a Dalit, and belongs to the Bharatiya Janata Party (BJP). He was succeeded as Mayor on 7 March 2012 by Indian National Congress (INC) candidate, Gulzar Banu.
