= Gulzar Banu =

Indian politician (born 1963)

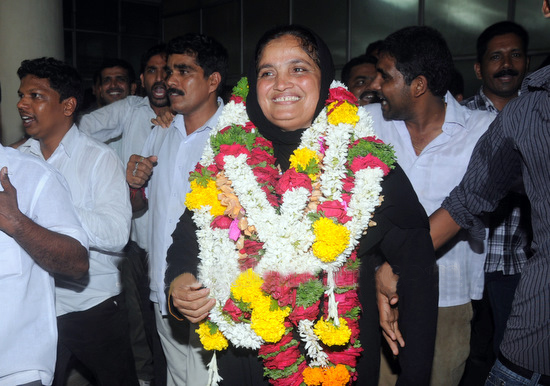
- Born: 1963 (age 62–63); India
- Education: Bem School Mangalore
- Title: Mayor of Mangalore City Corporation
- Term: 7 March 2012 – 20 February 2013
- Political party: Indian National Congress

Gulzar Banu (born 1963) is an Indian politician and former mayor of the Mangalore City Corporation, India. She is a 2 time corporator of Katipalla. A member of the Indian National Congress (INC), Banu is the sixth woman to hold the position of mayor.

== Early life and background ==
Bano studied till the class 8 and then she married Shamsuddin. The couple has ten children, four are married.

== Political career ==
Banu won the 2012 mayoral election after the Bharatiya Janata Party (BJP) candidate, Roopa Bangera, was disqualified due to a failure to properly submit her caste certificate in the prescribed format within the given time, and that the certificate subsequently submitted by her was past the time stipulated for filing the nomination. As a result, Banu became the only running candidate and was hence declared elected by default. This incident came as a shock to many, since the BJP nominee was widely considered to be most likely to win. Due to the absence of any provision in the Karnataka Municipal Corporations Act, 1976, to call for a no-confidence motion, Banu was to serve as mayor for the proscribed term from 7 March 2012 to 20 February 2013. She took office on 7 March 2012, with BJP politician Amitakala as Deputy Mayor.
