= Meriç Banu Yenal =

Turkish basketball player (born 1988)

Meriç Banu Yenal (born April 24, 1988 in Istanbul, Turkey) is a Turkish female basketball player. The young national plays last 3 years for Migrosspor under loan contract from Fenerbahçe S.K. She plays power forward and is 185 cm tall.

She played for Migros, Kocaeli Büyükşehir Belediyesi Kağıtspor, Ceyhan Belediyesi, Antakya Belediyesi, Canik Belediyesi and Samsun Basketbol Kulübü. In 2013-2014 She will play for Edirnespor.

== See also ==
- Turkish women in sports
