= Live with the Plovdiv Psychotic Symphony =

2019 live album by Sons of Apollo

Live album by Sons of Apollo
- Released: August 30, 2019
- Recorded: September 22, 2018
- Venues: Ancient Roman Theater, Plovdiv, Bulgaria
- Genres: Progressive metal, hard rock
- Length: 167:39
- Label: Inside Out Music

Sons of Apollo chronology
Psychotic Symphony (2017)	Live with the Plovdiv Psychotic Symphony (2019)	MMXX (2020)

Live with the Plovdiv Psychotic Symphony is a live album by the American progressive metal supergroup Sons of Apollo released on three CDs, DVD and Blu-ray Disc. Released on August 30, 2019, the album documents the band's performance at the Ancient Roman Theater in Plovdiv, Bulgaria, on September 22, 2018, alongside a full orchestra and choir.

== Track listing ==
Live with the Plovdiv Psychotic Symphony track listing
No.	Title	Length
1.	"God of the Sun"	11:54
2.	"Signs of the Time"	6:38
3.	"Divine Addiction"	5:14
4.	"That Metal Show Theme"	0:56
5.	"Just Let Me Breathe" (originally recorded by Dream Theater)	5:53
6.	"Billy Sheehan Bass Solo"	4:42
7.	"Lost in Oblivion"	4:45
8.	"Jeff Scott Soto Spot (The Prophet's Song / Save Me)" (originally recorded by Queen)	9:33
9.	"Alive"	5:12
10.	"The Pink Panther Theme"	4:31
11.	"Opus Maximus"	11:11
12.	"Kashmir" (originally recorded by Led Zeppelin)	9:33
13.	"Gates of Babylon" (originally recorded by Rainbow)	7:48
14.	"Labyrinth"	9:24
15.	"Dream On" (originally recorded by Aerosmith)	4:53
16.	"Diary of a Madman" (originally recorded by Ozzy Osbourne)	7:51
17.	"Comfortably Numb" (originally recorded by Pink Floyd)	9:16
18.	"The Show Must Go On" (originally recorded by Queen)	4:22
19.	"Hell's Kitchen" (originally recorded by Dream Theater)	4:31
20.	"Derek Sherinian Keyboard Solo" (includes excerpts from "Eruption" and "Spanish Fly" by Van Halen)	8:46
21.	"Lines in the Sand" (originally recorded by Dream Theater)	12:40
22.	"Bumblefoot Guitar Solo" (includes an excerpt from "Mean Street" by Van Halen)	2:36
23.	"And the Cradle Will Rock..." (originally recorded by Van Halen)	5:58
24.	"Coming Home"	9:32
Total length:		167:39

== Personnel ==
Sons of Apollo

- Jeff Scott Soto – lead vocals
- Ron "Bumblefoot" Thal – guitar, backing vocals
- Billy Sheehan – bass
- Derek Sherinian – keyboards
- Mike Portnoy – drums, backing vocals

Additional credits

- Artwork, layout – Stephen Van Baalen
- Authoring – Ray Shulman
- Conductor – Levon Manukyan
- Creative director – Mike Portnoy
- Direction and editing – Paul Green
- Lighting director – Jerry "Geral.D" Sell
- Mixing (5.1) – Peter Van 't Riet
- Mixing and mastering – Jerry Guidroz
- Orchestration – Derek Sherinian, Enrico Cacace
- Other (FOH sound) – Peter De Wint
- Photography – Hristo Shindov
- Producer – The Del Fuvio Brothers
- Drum technician – Jose Baraquio
- Guitar and bass technician – Jeff Mallard
- Keyboard technician – Corey Mast

== Charts ==
Chart performance for Live with the Plovdiv Psychotic Symphony
Chart (2019)	Peak position
Belgian Albums (Ultratop Wallonia)	72
French Albums (SNEP)	193
German Albums (Offizielle Top 100)	44
Spanish Albums (Promusicae)	60
Swiss Albums (Schweizer Hitparade)	33
