= Sons of Apollo =

American progressive metal band

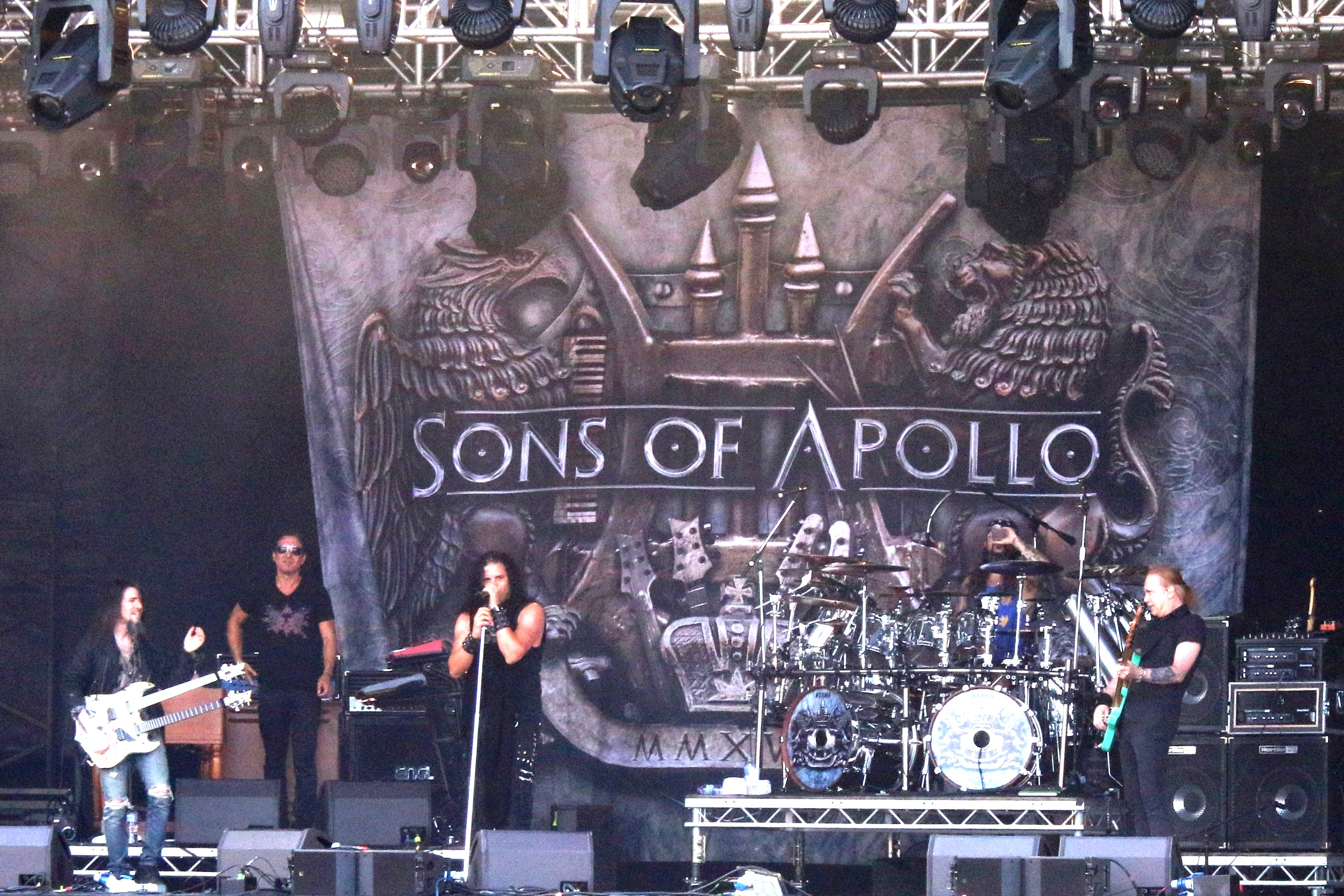
- Sons of Apollo performing in 2018. (L–R: Ron "Bumblefoot" Thal, Derek Sherinian, Jeff Scott Soto, Mike Portnoy and Billy Sheehan).

Background information
- Genres: Progressive metal
- Years active: 2017–2023
- Label: Inside Out Music
- Spinoffs: Whom Gods Destroy
- Spinoff of: Dream Theater
- Past members: Mike Portnoy; Derek Sherinian; Billy Sheehan; Jeff Scott Soto; Ron "Bumblefoot" Thal

Sons of Apollo was an American progressive metal supergroup formed in 2017 and composed of drummer Mike Portnoy, bassist Billy Sheehan, keyboardist Derek Sherinian, vocalist Jeff Scott Soto, and guitarist Ron "Bumblefoot" Thal.

== History ==
Sherinian and Portnoy played together in progressive metal band Dream Theater, from which Sherinian was asked to leave in 1999, while Portnoy left in 2010, and rejoined in 2023. Sheehan and Portnoy formed rock group The Winery Dogs with Sheehan's former Mr. Big bandmate Richie Kotzen. Portnoy, Sheehan, and Sherinian also worked together on a short-lived, live instrumental project with Tony MacAlpine called PSMS. Because of this, Portnoy considers MacAlpine to be part of Sons of Apollo's history as well as "part of the extended family". While touring, Sherinian asked Portnoy to join him in a full-time project. When Portnoy's schedule allowed, he agreed, and suggested Jeff Scott Soto and Ron "Bumblefoot" Thal to complete the line-up, having previously worked with Bumblefoot on Metal Allegiance and knowing Soto after his solo band opened several The Winery Dogs shows in South America. The members had insisted in multiple interviews that the supergroup was a full-time band and not just a side project.

The name of the band was proposed by Sherinian after he scrolled through a list of suggestions by Portnoy and saw the word "Apollo" among them. It was picked due to Apollo being the god of music. But because the band suspected there could be another band called Apollo, they thought of possible variations, which is how the name was chosen.

Their debut album, Psychotic Symphony, was produced by Portnoy and Sherinian (as "The Del Fuvio Brothers") and was released on October 20, 2017, via Inside Out Music/Sony Music. On August 30, 2019, the band released their first live album, Live with the Plovdiv Psychotic Symphony, filmed at the Plovdiv Roman theatre in Plovdiv, Bulgaria. Their second album, MMXX, was released on January 17, 2020.

In an interview with We Go To 11 on October 13, 2023, Thal claimed that the band had broken up, claiming, "When the pandemic hit, not everybody was on board to keep moving it forward and doing more with it. [...] I hope everybody enjoyed it. Past tense." In an early 2024 post on his Instagram account, Sherinian referred to MMXX as the band's "second and final album". Sherinian and Thal have since formed a new band, Whom Gods Destroy.

== Members ==
=== Lineup ===
- Jeff Scott Soto – lead vocals, acoustic guitar
- Ron "Bumblefoot" Thal – electric guitar, vocals
- Billy Sheehan – bass guitar, vocals
- Derek Sherinian – keyboards, string arrangements
- Mike Portnoy – drums, percussion, co-lead vocals

=== Touring members ===
- Felipe Andreoli – bass (2022)
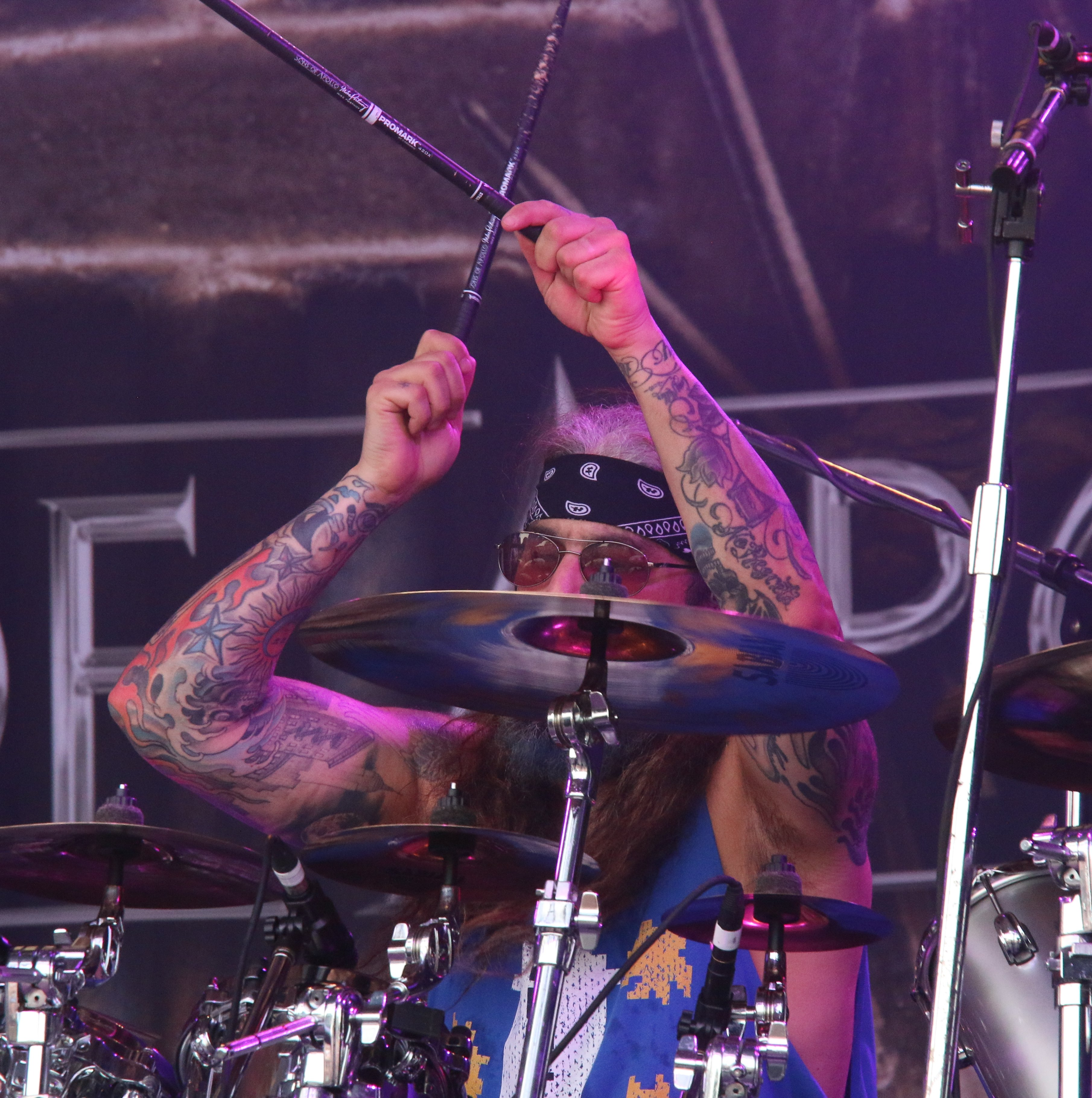
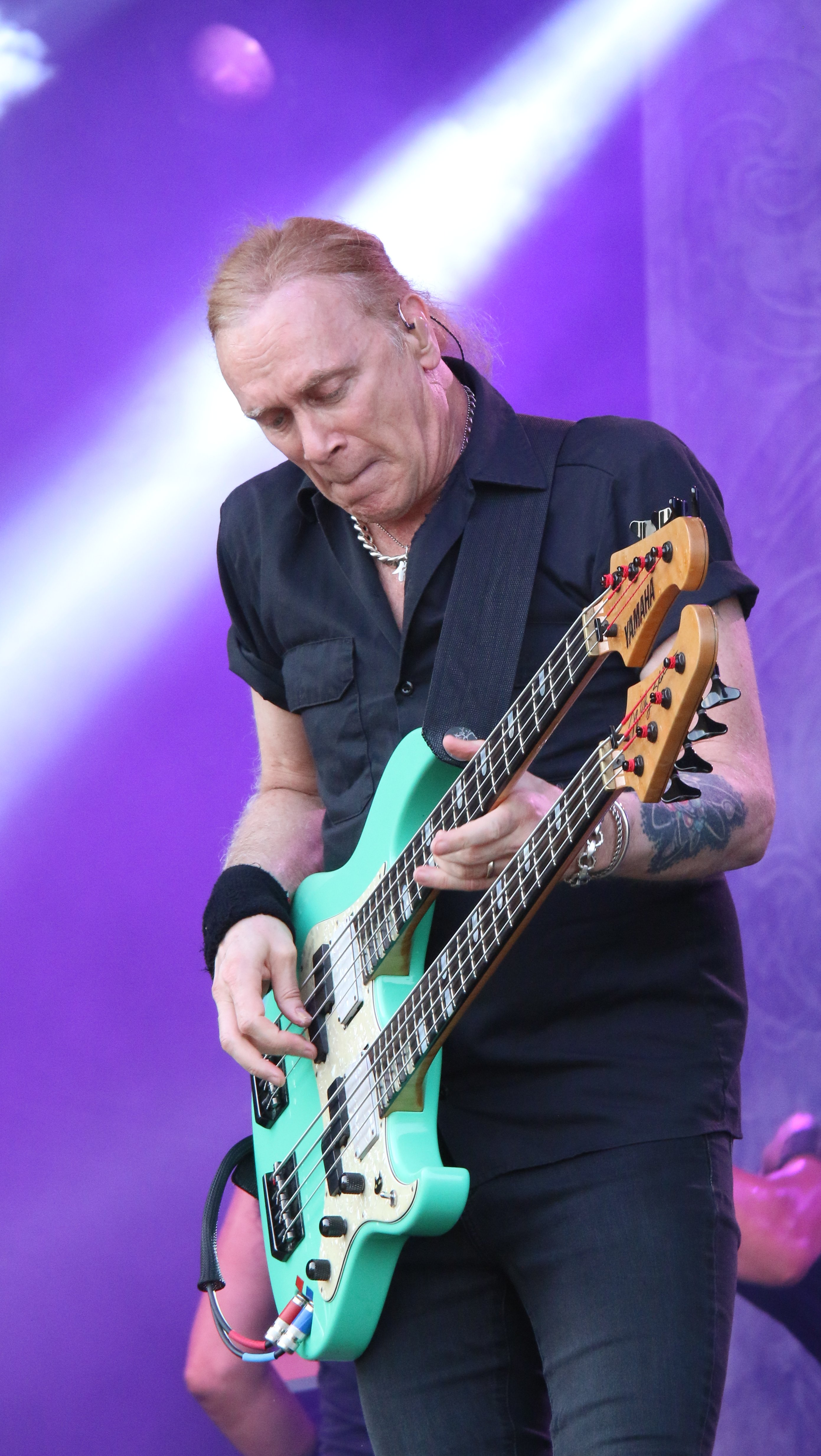
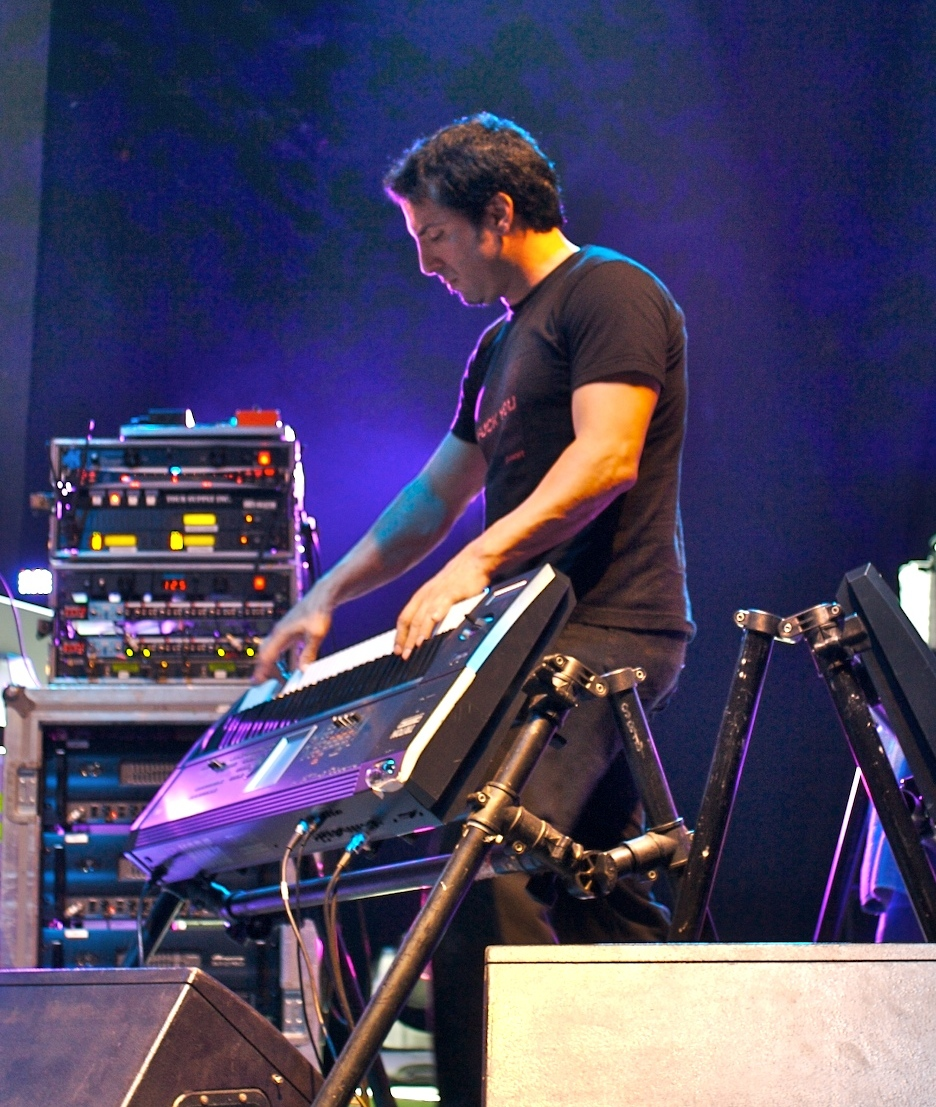
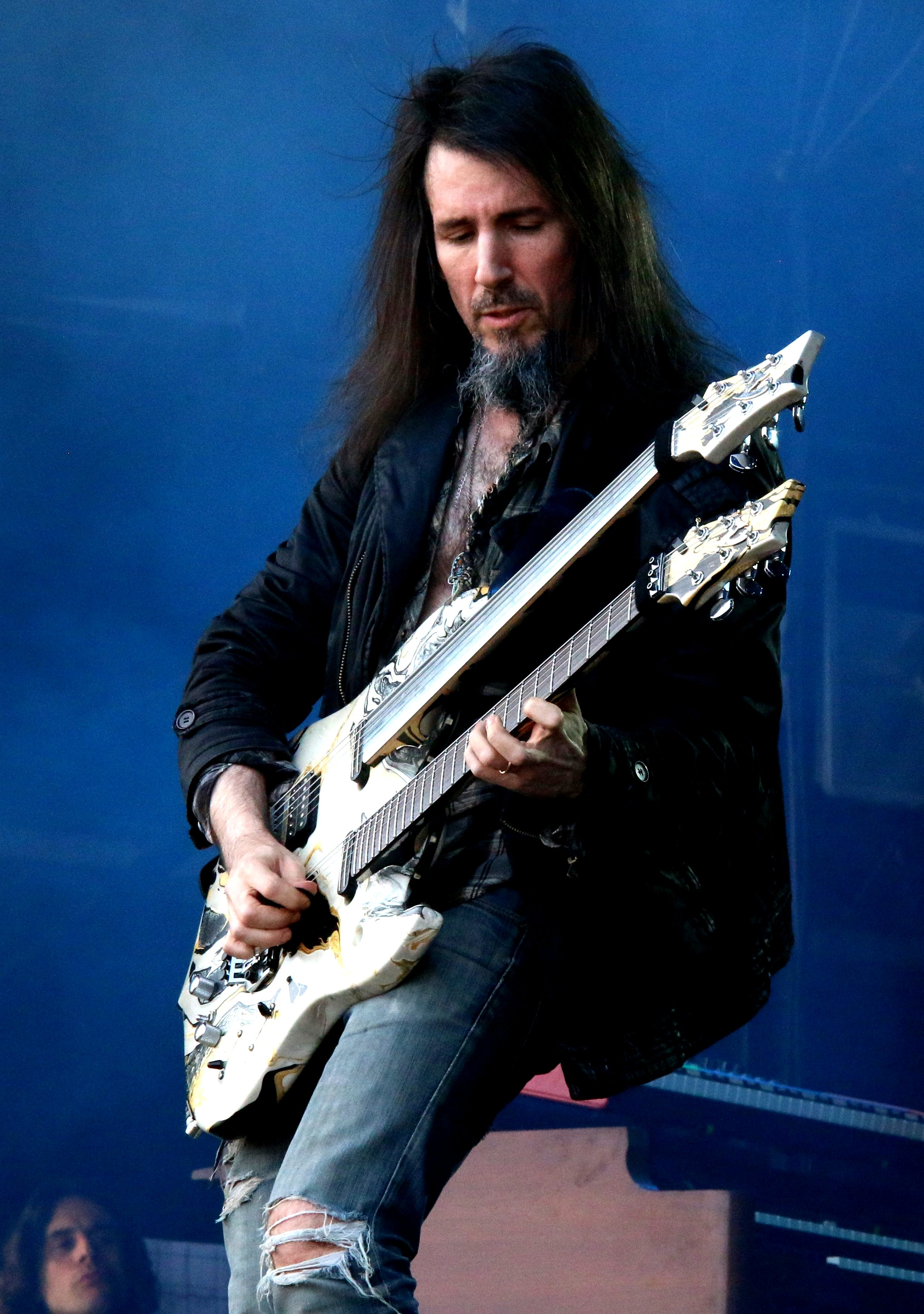
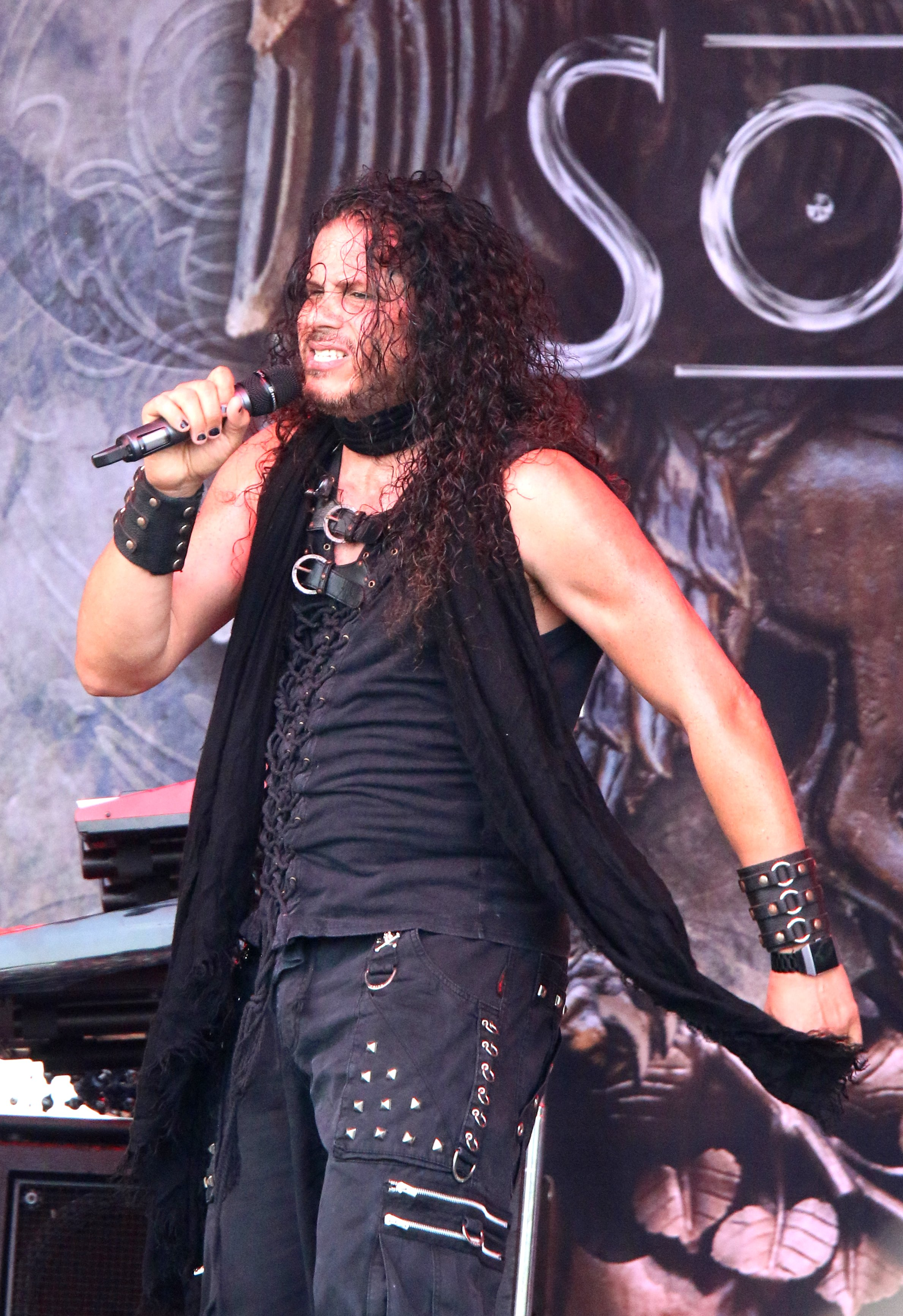
Left to right: Mike Portnoy, Billy Sheehan, Derek Sherinian, Ron "Bumblefoot" Thal and Jeff Scott Soto

== Discography ==
Studio albums

- Psychotic Symphony (2017)
- MMXX (2020)

Live albums

- Live with the Plovdiv Psychotic Symphony (2019)

Extended plays

- Alive/Tengo Vida (2018)

Singles

- "Signs of the Time" (2017)
- "Coming Home" (2017)
- "Just Let Me Breathe (Live)" (2019)
- "Labyrinth (Live)" (2019)
- "Goodbye Divinity" (2019)
- "Fall to Ascend" (2019)
- "Desolate July" (2020)
- "Asphyxiation" (2020)
