= Insanium =

Studio album by Whom Gods Destroy
- Released: March 15, 2024
- Recorded: Circa 2020 – June 2023
- Genre: Progressive metal
- Length: 52:47 (standard edition); 57:45 (Bandcamp download edition and special CD edition)
- Label: InsideOut
- Producer: Whom Gods Destroy

Singles from Insanium
- 1. "In the Name of War" Released: January 12, 2024; 2. "Over Again" Released: February 7, 2024; 3. "Crawl" Released: February 28, 2024

Professional ratings
Review scores
Source	Rating
Metal.de	7/10 stars
Metal Injection	6/10 stars

Insanium is the debut album by the American progressive metal supergroup Whom Gods Destroy, released on March 15, 2024 through InsideOut Music.

The band and album was announced in December 2023. Details of the album were announced in January 2024, alongside its first single "In the Name of War".

== Background ==
Commenting on the album, guitarist Bumblefoot said. "Derek and I began writing new music in 2020... Soon after, Dino joined, followed by Yas and Bruno. We'd share ideas, and each record parts, building and rebuilding songs, and by June '23 the album was finished."

== Track listing ==
All songs written by Whom Gods Destroy.

Insanium track listing
No.	Title	Length
1.	"In the Name of War"	6:38
2.	"Over Again"	5:01
3.	"The Decision"	7:08
4.	"Crawl"	6:36
5.	"Find My Way Back"	5:46
6.	"Crucifier"	4:43
7.	"Keeper of the Gate"	4:54
8.	"Hypernova 158"	3:24
9.	"Insanium"	8:37
Total length:		52:47

Bandcamp download and special CD edition bonus track
No.	Title	Length
10.	"Requiem"	4:58
Total length:		57:45

== Personnel ==
- Bruno Valverde – drums
- Yas Nomura – bass
- Dino Jelusick – vocals
- Derek Sherinian – keyboards
- Ron "Bumblefoot" Thal – guitars, mixing, mastering

== Charts ==
Chart performance for Insanium
Chart (2024)	Peak position
Scottish Albums (OCC)	73
UK Album Downloads (OCC)	76
UK Rock & Metal Albums (OCC)	18
