= Dino Jelusick =

Croatian singer-songwriter (born 1992)

- Jelusick in 2019

Background information
- Born: Dino Jelusić; 4 June 1992 (age 34); Požega, Croatia
- Genres: Hard rock; blues rock; heavy metal; progressive rock; groove metal
- Occupations: Singer; musician; songwriter
- Instruments: Vocals; guitar; keyboards
- Years active: 1997–present
- Label: Frontiers Records
- Member of: Jelusick; Trans-Siberian Orchestra; Whom Gods Destroy
- Formerly of: Whitesnake; Animal Drive; Stone Leaders; The Ralph; Dirty Shirley
- Website: dino-jelusick.com

Dino Jelusić (born 4 June 1992), also known by his stage name Dino Jelusick, is a Croatian singer, musician, and songwriter. He was the winner of the inaugural edition of the Junior Eurovision Song Contest, in 2003. He is the founder, principal songwriter, and lead singer of the hard rock/heavy metal band Animal Drive, which was formed in 2012 and disbanded in 2021. Since 2016, Jelusick has been a touring member for the American rock band Trans-Siberian Orchestra, and in 2021, he joined Whitesnake. In 2023, he released the album Follow the Blind Man with his band Jelusick.

== Early life ==
Jelusick was born Dino Jelusić on 4 June 1992 in Požega, Croatia. He lived most of his life in the capital city of Zagreb. He earned a master's degree from the Academy of Music, University of Zagreb, in 2020.

== Career ==
=== 1997–2005: First musical efforts and Junior Eurovision Song Contest ===
As his parents also played musical instruments, Jelusick was introduced to music and singing at the age of three and started performing at the age of five by appearing on television, on stages, and at festivals.

Jelusick wrote his first English song at the age of seven. In 2003, he participated in the first Junior Eurovision Song Contest, in Denmark, with a song he wrote at the age of ten, "Ti si moja prva ljubav", and won with 134 points. Jelusick released his debut solo album, No. 1, in 2003, and an English version a year later. He toured the United States, Scandinavia, and Australia until 2005, and the tour included four large concerts in Denmark with a combined audience of 100,000 people. The same year, Jelusick became the youngest nominee of the Croatian music award Porin, at the age of twelve. In 2005, he was one of three main acts at the Langeland festival in Denmark, along with UB40 and Ronan Keating.

=== 2006–2016: Solo career and change to rock and metal musical style ===
Around 2007, as part of adolescence, Jelusick's voice changed and lost part of its upper register. Jelusick had grown up listening to King's X, Slash, Whitesnake, Dream Theater, and Toto, among others, and he decided to change his musical direction to hard rock and metal.

In 2009, Jelusick began recording an album in Melbourne, Australia, with producer Mark Berry, and finalized it with Swedish producer Robert Ahrling in Malmö. The record, released in August 2011, was titled Living My Own Life. However, as he did not write any of the songs on it, Jelusick does not perform them live.

Between 2012 and 2013, Jelusick was hired to take part in an international project in South Africa called Synkropation, which consisted of an album featuring the collaboration of different artists, including Mandoza and Dilana. Though the album was never released, Jelusick was featured on several songs and played to an audience of 50,000 people.

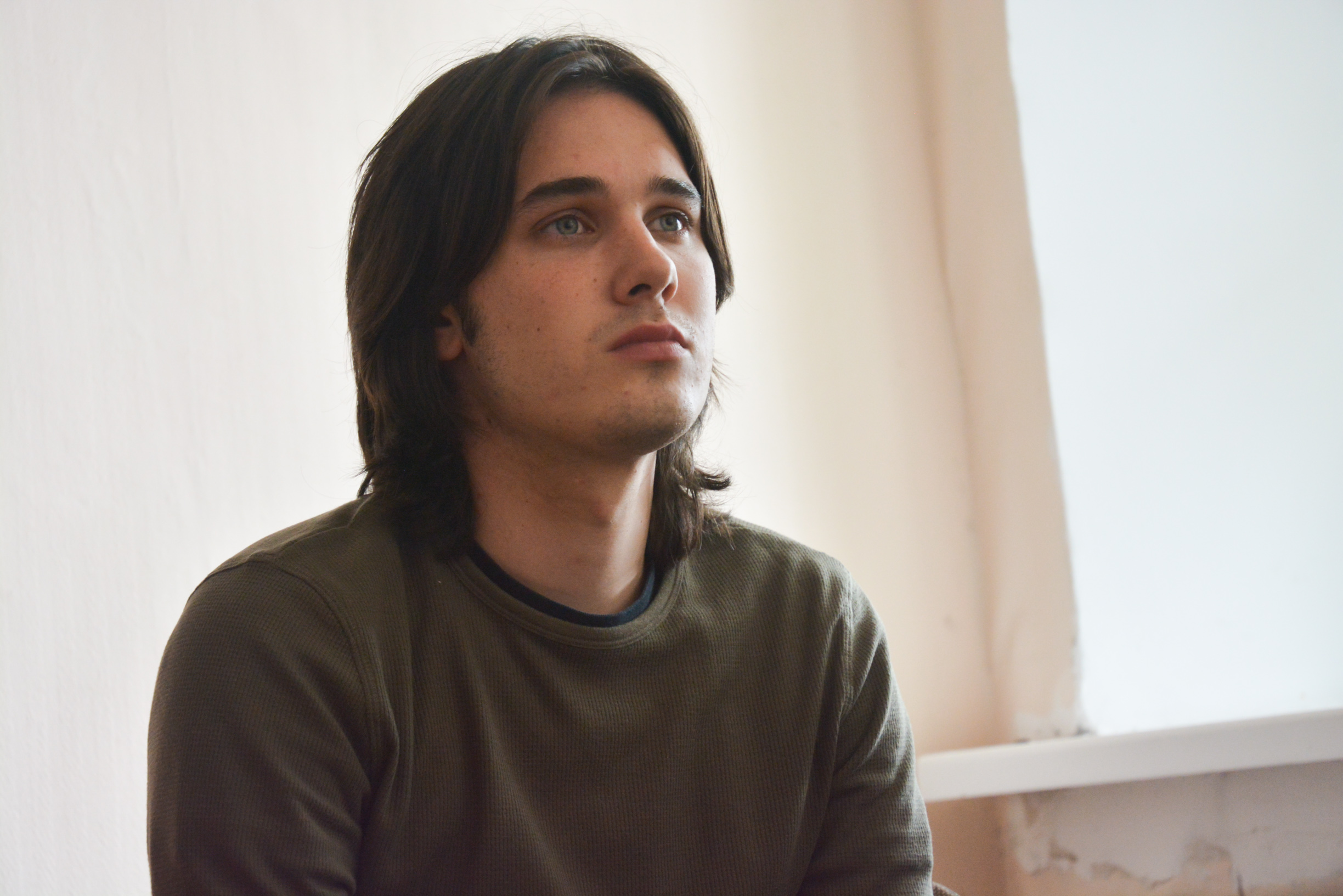
Dino Jelusick in 2014

In 2014, Jelusick was awarded second place at the international festival Slavianski Bazaar in Vitebsk, in Belarus. Afterward, he began experiencing problems with his voice. In September, he underwent surgery for Reinke's edema. After the surgery, he recorded another album, this one entirely composed by him. A concept album titled Prošao sam sve, it was released in November 2014. The record is based on the autobiographical novel 260 days by Marijan Gubina, about a ten-year-old boy who survives 260 days of imprisonment in a war camp during the 1991–1995 Croatian War of Independence.

In 2015, Jelusick won four awards at the Discovery Fest in Bulgaria, one of which was for his song "Father". In 2016, he won the New Wave contest in Sochi, Russia.

=== Projects ===
==== Animal Drive, Jelusick ====
In 2012, Jelusick formed the hard rock band Animal Drive, which was initially his solo band; their final lineup came together in 2015. He was the project's main songwriter. The group's biggest influence was Whitesnake, and their live performances featured Whitesnake's 2004 cover version of Deep Purple's "Burn" as well as songs by Skid Row and Dream Theater. Before Jelusick joined TSO's tour, Animal Drive recorded a few songs, and on the recommendation of TSO vocalist Jeff Scott Soto, Frontiers Records listened to their work and decided to sign a record deal with them in 2017. They were the first Croatian rock band to sign with such a major record label and have an album published worldwide.

Their debut studio album, Bite!, was released in February 2018, to critical acclaim. In April 2019, they issued a covers EP, titled Back to the Roots, which included a rendition of Skid Row's "Monkey Business" as its first single, and Roxette's "The Look" (with guest vocalist Rosa Laricchiuta) as its second single, in May 2019. In June 2021, Animal Drive disbanded, following conflict with Frontiers Records.

In November 2022, Jelusick finished a two-year-long legal battle with the label and began recording new songs with his new band, Jelusick. Their debut album, Follow the Blind Man, was released in September 2023. In Croatia, it won a Porin award for Best Rock Album as well as receiving nominations for Album of the Year and Best Performance by a Group with Vocals.

==== TSO, Stone Leaders, Lords of Black, Whitesnake, Whom Gods Destroy ====
February 2016 was a turning point in Jelusick's music career. He later commented that until the mid-2010s, he had faced numerous difficulties within the Croatian music industry. Due to these problems, he considered ending his music career. Reportedly, his live performance of Queen's "The Show Must Go On" was noticed by American rock band Trans-Siberian Orchestra (TSO), who were searching for two male touring vocalists. After auditioning and meeting with producer Paul O'Neill, Jelusick was chosen to join the group and took part in their 2016 tour. During the 2017 tour, the band, with Kayla Reeves on the East and Jelusick on the West lineup, honored O'Neill, who had died in April, with the song "The Safest Way into Tomorrow".

In 2015, American drummer John Macaluso was looking for a singer and keyboardist for his new American-Croatian band Stone Leaders. Jelusick joined and helped record their self-titled debut album, which was eventually released in March 2019. During this time, Jelusick was also a member of the Croatian metal band the Ralph, with whom he released the album Enter Escape in February 2017.

In May 2019, Lords of Black's Tony Hernando released a self-titled album with his solo project Restless Spirits. Jelusick sang on two of the album's tracks, "Cause I Know You're the One" and "Lost Time (Not to Be Found Again)". The record also included guest artists Deen Castronovo, Johnny Gioeli, and Alessandro Del Vecchio. In late 2018, Jelusick recorded vocals and keyboards for a George Lynch project titled Dirty Shirley, which also featured Will Hunt on drums and Trevor Roxx on bass. The self-titled album was released in January 2020, to positive reviews.

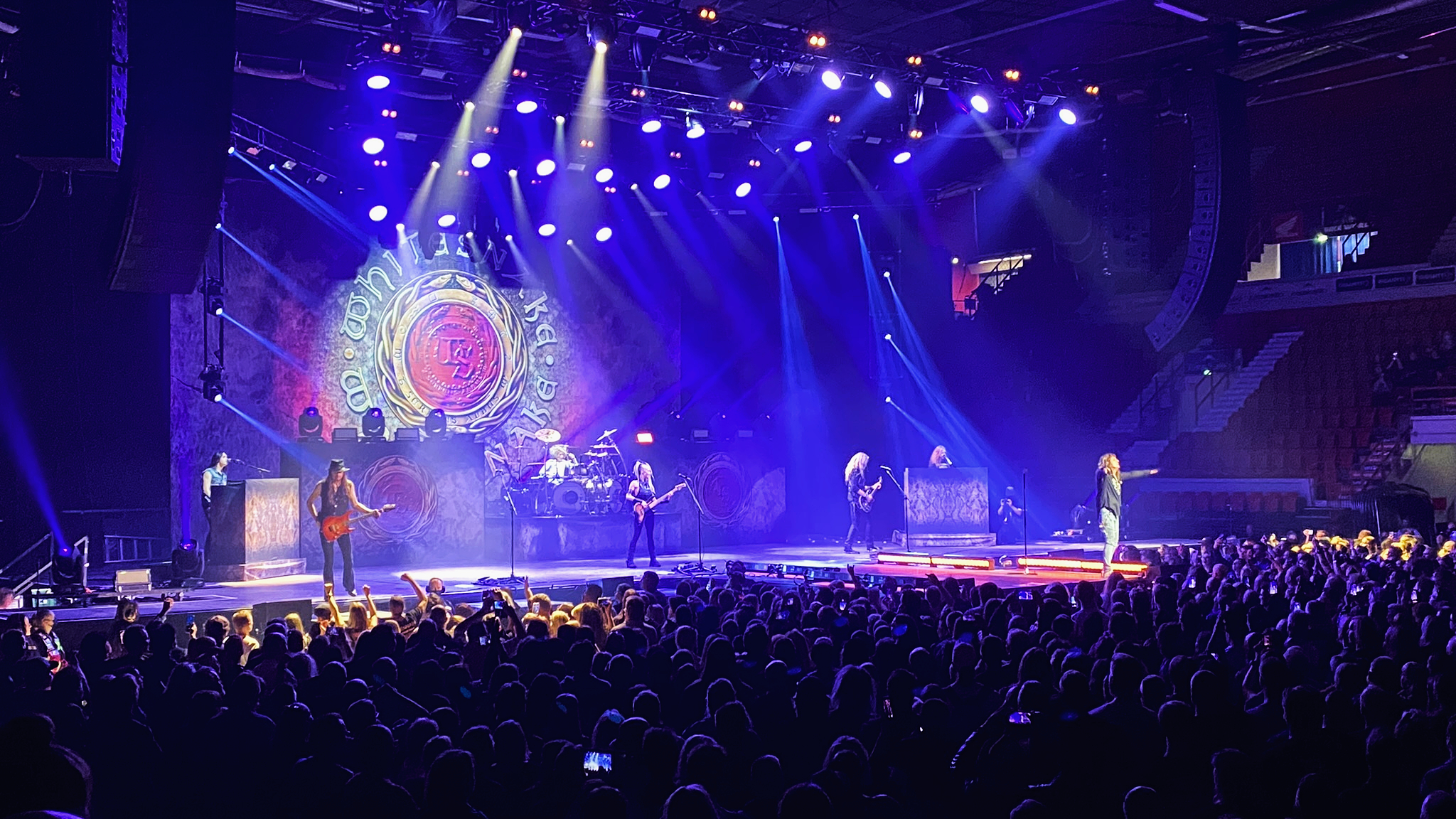
Dino Jelusick (left) performing with Whitesnake in Helsinki, Finland, on 6 June 2022.

In July 2021, Jelusick joined the British hard rock band Whitesnake as a backing vocalist and keyboardist.

In March 2022, Jelusick teamed up with Michael Romeo, performing all vocals on Romeo's solo album War of the Worlds, Pt. 2. Matthias Mineur of the German edition of Metal Hammer said Jelusick "lifts" the album "to an even higher level" than that of its predecessor and finished his review saying that the release "inspires on two levels, so that the listener can hardly decide which of them is the more important".

In December 2023, keyboardist Derek Sherinian and guitarist Ron "Bumblefoot" Thal unveiled a new progressive metal project named Whom Gods Destroy, recruiting Jelusick for vocal duties, along with Yas Nomura on bass and Bruno Valverde on drums. Their debut album, Insanium, was released in March 2024.

=== TV appearances ===
In 2018 and 2019, Jelusick performed in several episodes of Hrvatska Radiotelevizija's entertainment and music program A-strana and was the youngest mentor in the Croatian version of the BBC show Just the Two of Us. His appearance with partner and actress Tara Thaller won the competition. From November 2023 until January 2024, Jelusick served as a mentor on the fourth season of The Voice Hrvatska.

== Selected discography ==
Project	Album	Year	Notes
Solo	No. 1	2003	singer-songwriter
Solo	Living My Own Life	2011	vocals
Solo	Prošao sam sve	2014	singer-songwriter
Jeff Scott Soto	"Give In to Me" (cover)	2016	backing vocals
The Ralph	Enter Escape	2017	vocals
Chaos Addict	Sacrament of Hope	2017	guest vocals
Animal Drive	Bite!	2018	vocals, keyboards, guitar, songwriter, producer
Animal Drive	Back to the Roots (cover EP)	2019	vocals, keyboards, producer
Stone Leaders	Stone Leaders	2019	vocals, keyboards
Restless Spirits (with Tony Hernando)	Restless Spirits	2019	vocals (#4, #10)
Dirty Shirley (with George Lynch)	Dirty Shirley	2020	vocals, keyboards, lyrics, producer
Magnus Karlsson's Free Fall	We Are the Night	2020	vocals (#1, #8)
Michael Romeo	War of the Worlds, Pt. 2	2022	vocals
Jelusick	Follow the Blind Man	2023	vocals, keyboards, guitar, songwriter, producer
Whom Gods Destroy	Insanium	2024	vocals
Jelusick	Apolitical Ecstasy	2025	vocals, keyboards, guitar, songwriter, producer

Awards and achievements
Preceded by None	Croatia in the Junior Eurovision Song Contest; 2003	Succeeded by Nika Turković with "Hej mali"
Preceded by None	Winner of the Junior Eurovision Song Contest; 2003	Succeeded by (Spain) María Isabel with "Antes Muerta que Sencilla"
