= Whom Gods Destroy (band) =

American progressive metal supergroup

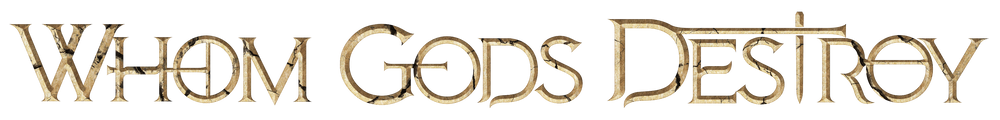

Background information
- Genres: Progressive metal
- Years active: 2023–present
- Label: InsideOut Music
- Spinoff of: Sons of Apollo
- Members: Derek Sherinian; Ron "Bumblefoot" Thal; Dino Jelusick; Yas Nomura; Bruno Valverde
- Website: www.facebook.com/wgdestroy/

Whom Gods Destroy is an American progressive metal supergroup, formed in 2023 by former Sons of Apollo members, Derek Sherinian (keyboards) and Ron "Bumblefoot" Thal (guitar), alongside Croatian vocalist Dino Jelusick, bassist Yas Nomura and drummer Bruno Valverde (Angra). Sherinian and Thal started writing music together in 2020, but the project was not officially formed until after Sons of Apollo split up in 2023, with the project's debut album finished in June that year.

The band was announced on Facebook on November 21, 2023, with Jelusick being announced on November 26, Nomura on December 3, and Valverde on December 6. On December 12, they signed to German prog label InsideOut Music.

Their debut album, Insanium, was released on March 15, 2024. The first single from the album, "In The Name Of War", was released January 12, 2024, with an accompanying video directed by Vicente Cordero of Industrialism Films. Their second single was “Over Again”, on February 7.

== Members ==
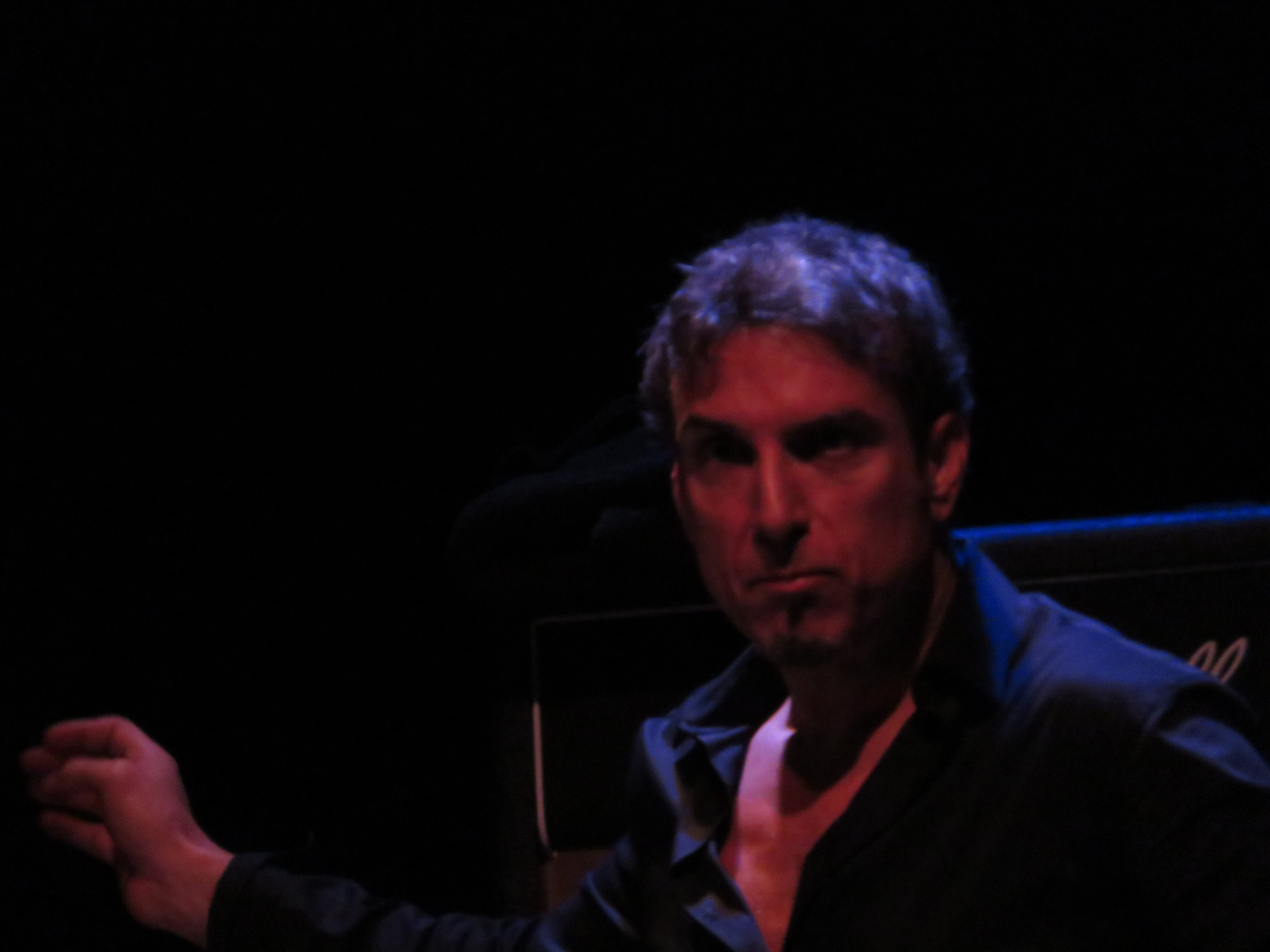
Sherinian

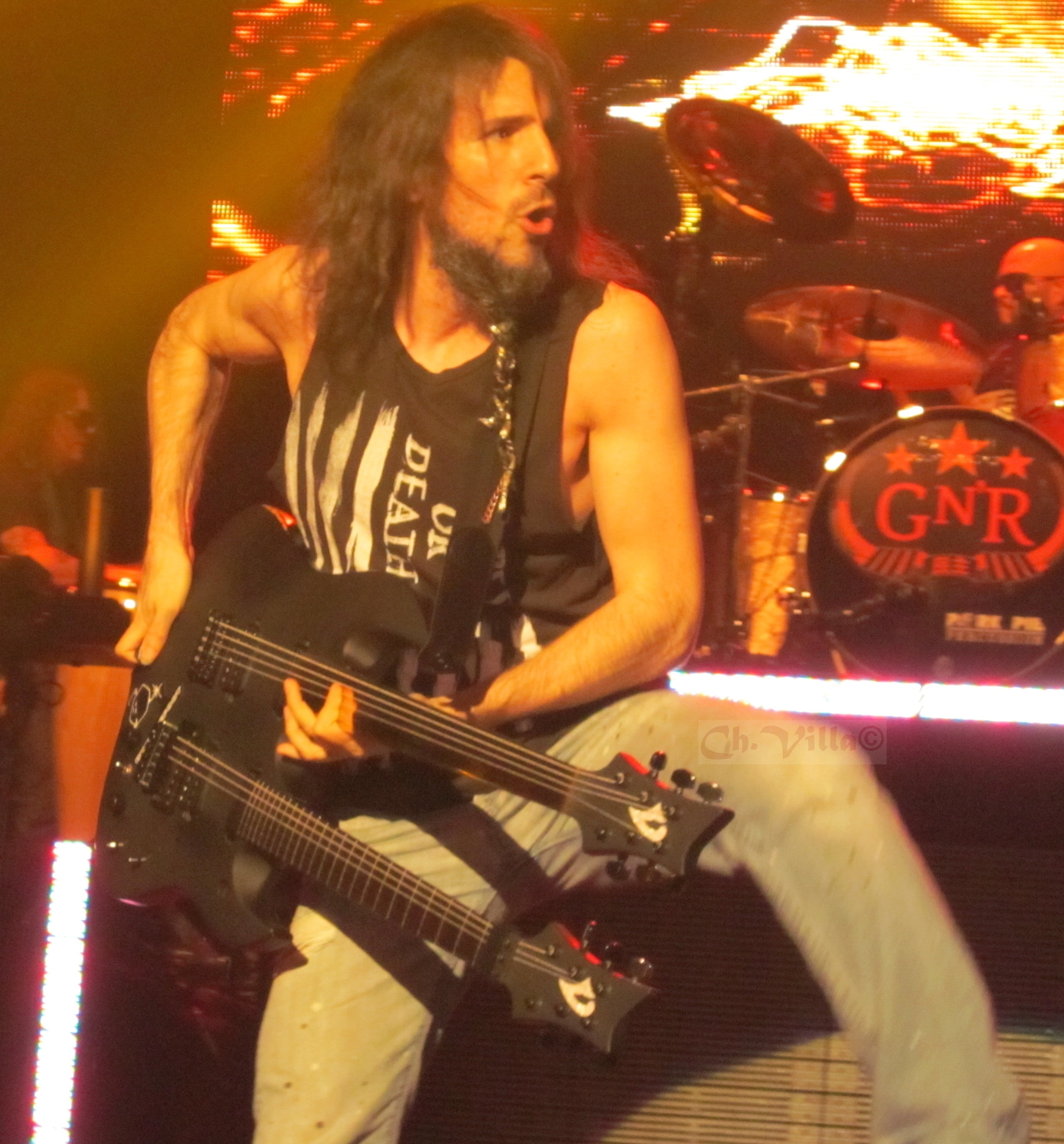
Thal

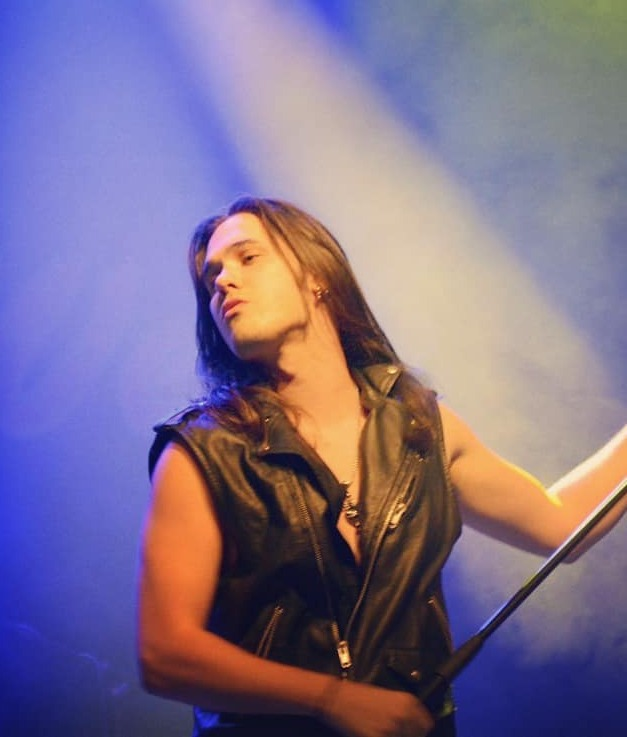
Jelusick

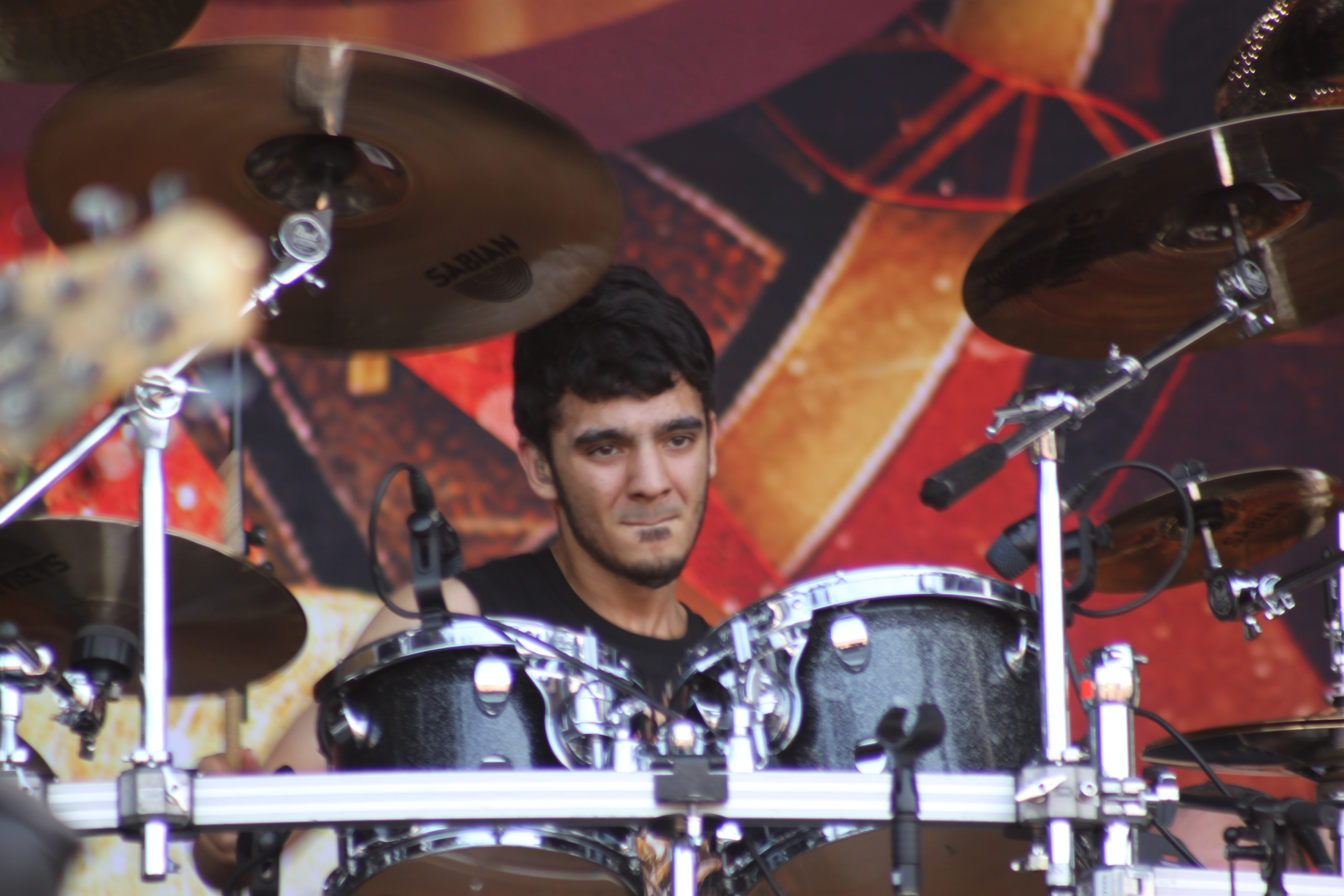
Valverde
- Derek Sherinian – keyboards, Hammond B3 organ
- Ron "Bumblefoot" Thal – guitars
- Dino Jelusick – vocals
- Yas Nomura – bass
- Bruno Valverde – drums

== Discography ==
Studio albums

- Insanium (2024)

Singles

- "In the Name of War" (2024)
- "Over Again" (2024)
- "Crawl" (2024)
