= MMXX (Sons of Apollo album) =

Studio album by Sons of Apollo
- Released: January 17, 2020
- Recorded: 2019
- Studios: Ocean Studios (Burbank, California)
- Genres: Progressive metal, hard rock
- Length: 58:36
- Label: Inside Out Music
- Producers: The Del Fuvio Brothers (Mike Portnoy, Derek Sherinian)

Sons of Apollo chronology
Live With The Plovdiv Psychotic Symphony (2019)	MMXX (2020)

Sons of Apollo studio album chronology
Psychotic Symphony (2017)	MMXX (2020)

Singles from MMXX
- 1. "Goodbye Divinity" Released: November 15, 2019; 2. "Fall to Ascend" Released: December 13, 2019; 3. "Desolate July" Released: January 10, 2020; 4. "Asphyxiation" Released: February 20, 2020

MMXX (pronounced "2020") is the second and final studio album by American supergroup Sons of Apollo, released on January 17, 2020 via Inside Out Music. It is available as a standard CD package, limited edition 2 CD package with instrumental and a cappella versions, 2 LP + CD package, and digital download.

== Background, writing and recording ==
Keyboardist Derek Sherinian and drummer Mike Portnoy agreed that the album benefited from a bigger chemistry between members, who had already performed live together over 80 times by the time of the album production, aside from their debut album.

Both of them, joined by guitarist Ron "Bumblefoot" Thal, met at Portnoy's home studio in Pennsylvania and wrote the whole album in around three weeks. The album was recorded in around eight months, with each member being able to work in their own home studios.

Vocalist Jeff Scott Soto wrote all the lyrics, with Sherinian helping him with some of the melody lines. He commented that he admired Soto's bluesy voice, which he thought contrasted with the more operatic vocals of other progressive metal bands.

== Title and cover ==
Because the album was released in the beginning of a decade, Portnoy considered calling it "MMXX" (2020 in Roman numerals). Commenting on the cover, which was again created by Thomas Ewerhard, he said "for the first record, we had a mythological feel. This time around though, there's a much more futuristic style to what we've got. It has a very 21st century appeal. And the band crest is more polished, cleaned up and a lot more modern than last time, when it had an old fashioned look".

== Song information ==
The opening track, "Goodbye Divinity", was released as the first single on November 15, 2019, with a music video directed by Vicente Cordero. Portnoy says he knew the song would be the opener and the first single "from the minute we finished writing" it. He also said he knew it would be the ideal opening for shows, as well. Its working title was "Blood Orchid" and it was created around a riff that Sherinian came up with during one of his live solos.

Soto wrote the lyrics to the song thinking of minor hardships the band went through during its first tour and how they handled the problems. "Goodbye Divinity" is about saying goodbye to the good things that should have come to the band and how the members managed to "harness the pain".

"Wither to Black" was based on a riff written by Bumblefoot that was initially named "Rushgarden" because it sounded like a mixture of Rush and Soundgarden. "Asphyxiation" was mostly written by Sherinian and its working title was NIM — "Nine Inch Meshuggah".

"Desolate July" was written after David Z., a bass player who died in an automobile accident involving former Portnoy band Adrenaline Mob's touring bus. David was also a member of Soto's solo band and both performed together on Trans-Siberian Orchestra. The title of the track refers to the fact that every July, Soto and other people that were close to David feel a sense of emptiness, since that's the month in which he died. Instrumentally speaking, Portnoy consider it equivalent to "Alive", from the previous album. It was also released as a single (on January 10, 2020) and also received a video, directed by Christian Rios.

"King of Delusion" was developed from a short piano piece by Sherinian

"Fall to Ascend" was released as the band's second single on December 13, 2019, along with another video. It was called "Jumper" when it was in the works and Soto considers it a continuation of "King of Delusion".

== Track listing ==
All lyrics are written by Jeff Scott Soto; all music is composed by Derek Sherinian, Ron "Bumblefoot" Thal and Mike Portnoy.

MMXX track listing
No.	Title	Length
1.	"Goodbye Divinity"	7:12
2.	"Wither to Black"	4:44
3.	"Asphyxiation"	5:07
4.	"Desolate July"	5:58
5.	"King of Delusion"	8:48
6.	"Fall to Ascend"	5:06
7.	"Resurrection Day"	5:51
8.	"New World Today"	15:50
Total length:		58:36

== Personnel ==
Sons of Apollo

- Jeff Scott Soto – lead vocals
- Ron "Bumblefoot" Thal – guitar, backing vocals
- Billy Sheehan – bass
- Derek Sherinian – keyboards
- Mike Portnoy – drums, backing vocals

Technical personnel

- The Del Fuvio Brothers (Portnoy, Sherinian) – production
- Thomas Ewerhard – cover art
- Jay Ruston & Maor Appelbaum - Mastering Engineering
- Jay Ruston - Mixing Engineer
- John Douglass - Assistant Mix Engineer
- Hristo Shindov - Photography
- Andy Freeman - Additional Engineering
- Thomas Cuce - Pre Production and Additional Engineering
- Greg Foeller - Assistant Engineering
- Jerry Guidroz - Drum Engineering

== Charts ==
Sales chart performance for MMXX
Chart (2020)	Peak position
Austrian Albums (Ö3 Austria)	30
Belgian Albums (Ultratop Flanders)	82
Belgian Albums (Ultratop Wallonia)	53
Dutch Albums (Album Top 100)	48
Finnish Albums (Suomen virallinen lista)	36
French Albums (SNEP)	86
Hungarian Albums (MAHASZ)	15
Italian Albums (FIMI)	84
Scottish Albums (Official Charts)	23
Spanish Albums (PROMUSICAE)	26
Swiss Albums (Schweizer Hitparade)	8
UK Albums (Official Charts)	90

== See also ==
- List of 2020 albums
