= Psychotic Symphony =

Studio album by Sons of Apollo
- Released: October 20, 2017
- Recorded: March 1–early August 2017
- Studios: Ocean Studios in Burbank, California, United States
- Genres: Progressive metal, hard rock
- Length: 57:35
- Label: Inside Out Music/Sony
- Producers: The Del Fuvio Brothers (Mike Portnoy, Derek Sherinian)

Sons of Apollo chronology
Psychotic Symphony (2017)	Live With The Plovdiv Psychotic Symphony (2019)

Sons of Apollo studio album chronology
Psychotic Symphony (2017)	MMXX (2020)

Psychotic Symphony is the debut studio album by American supergroup Sons of Apollo. It was released on October 20, 2017. The album was produced by drummer Mike Portnoy and keyboardist Derek Sherinian under the name "The Del Fuvio Brothers" a nickname they adopted during their time together in Dream Theater. All band members were involved in the creation of the songs. Portnoy and Sherinian were the main songwriters. The album was released as CD, digital download, vinyl and a special edition containing a bonus disc with instrumental versions of the songs and an alternate mix of "Opus Maximus." The band began touring to promote the album in early 2018.

== Concept and recording ==
The band kept their sound as simple as possible. When Soto tried out more sophisticated ideas the band decided to keep things simple and straight. The album's overall sound has both the virtuosity of progressive metal and the straightforwardness of classic rock. When Portnoy and Sherinian started the band they thought it would go in a direction similar to Dream Theater only to realize it would end up completely different.

Psychotic Symphony is influenced by: Deep Purple ("Divine Addiction"), Van Halen ("Coming Home") and U.K. When asked about it being a progressive rock album Bumblefoot said:

There's classic Prog... there's some metal in there. So how do you describe it? You can't call it Prog metal because that would make me think of something a little more continuously mathematical and fast. I would just call it Prog Rock. To me it fits calling it that.

The album's title is taken off a line from the track "Lost in Oblivion". When asked about the artwork, Sherinian explained: "[...] credit goes to Mike Portnoy. He was in charge of the cover art. He had a vision of doing a strong press, clean press and then his symbolism - the eagle and the lion and then you can see all the headstocks of Billy and Bumblefoot." Originally, the cover was to have two lions facing each other (each representing Portnoy and Sherinian) but the keyboardist suggested they replace his lion with an eagle.

The album recording took ten days. Bumblefoot, Sherinian, and Portnoy began work initially with Sheehan and Soto joining the band halfway into the recording sessions due to touring commitments. Most of the lyrics were written by Soto with some song titles were suggested by Sherinian.

== Song information ==
"God of the Sun", was mostly written by Sherinian and was the first track to be recorded since it was the only song that was already sketched before the album sessions. It contains Sherinian's favorite keyboard solo in the album.

"Coming Home" illustrates how Sons of Apollo is a contemporary progressive metal band influenced by classic rock bands. A promotional video of the track was released on September 15, 2017, and shot at Ocean Studios. The video shows all five members in a circle performing the song live in studio. According to Portnoy: "'Coming Home' feels like the Sons of Apollo Grand Entrance--almost like a fighter entering the ring. I knew this had to be the first video and first time people see us playing together." The lyrics were mostly written by Soto. The riff at the chorus was inspired by the main bass riff on Digital Underground's "The Humpty Dance."

"Signs of the Time" was the first song written by the band together. It was the first to be revealed to the public on August 11, 2017. The track opens with Bumblefoot, Sheehan and Portnoy playing a riff followed by verses written by Portnoy and sung in unison with Soto. The chorus lines were written by Soto and sung by Soto, Bumblefoot and Portnoy. The lyrics describe Soto "taking a closer look at the world." The song's riff was given the working title "Korntera" by Bumblefoot because it sounded like a mixture of Korn and Pantera. Sherinian saw it as a modern-day Kansas song.

"Labyrinth" is Portnoy's personal favorite on the album and features unusual time signatures and orchestrations.

"Alive" was suggested by Soto and the band's response to it was so positive they barely changed the song. Portnoy stated that the song was composed by all the instrumentalists and had its lyrics and melodies written by Soto. The band envisioned the song as a potential radio hit.

"Lost in Oblivion" was written around a Bumblefoot riff. Portnoy pointed it out as "one of the hardest patterns I've ever had to cop." The song was the subject of a promotional video directed by Vicente Cordero and released simultaneously with the album.

"Figaro's Whore" is a short keyboard instrumental track that serves as a prelude to "Divine Addiction" and was compared by Portnoy to Van Halen's "Eruption." According to Sherinian "the title comes from the fact that there's one part where I start shredding and when it starts going down low like: 'Fig-aro, fig-aro, figaro, figaro, figaro' –reminding me of The Barber of Seville. 'Whore' was added simply because it's a fun word to say". The use of the word "whore" in the title led to the track being labeled with an explicit lyrics warning on digital retailers, despite it having no lyrics at all. Sherinian and Portnoy noted the oddity of such a label on an entirely instrumental song.

"Divine Addiction" talks about sex addiction from the first-person perspective of a girl.

The ending track "Opus Maximus" is an instrumental that the band composed "section by section" with "no destination." It was a process that probably took two days according to Sherinian.

== Track listing ==
No.	Title	Lyrics	Music	Length
1.	"God of the Sun"	Jeff Scott Soto, Derek Sherinian	Sherinian	11:12
2.	"Coming Home"	Soto, Sherinian, Mike Portnoy	Sherinian, Ron "Bumblefoot" Thal, Portnoy	4:22
3.	"Signs of the Time"	Soto	Sherinian, Thal, Portnoy	6:42
4.	"Labyrinth"	Soto, Sherinian, Portnoy	Sherinian, Thal, Portnoy	9:22
5.	"Alive"	Soto	Sherinian, Thal, Portnoy, Billy Sheehan	5:05
6.	"Lost in Oblivion"	Soto, Sherinian	Sherinian, Thal, Portnoy	4:27
7.	"Figaro's Whore" (Instrumental)	Instrumental	Sherinian	1:04
8.	"Divine Addiction"	Soto, Sherinian	Sherinian, Thal, Portnoy, Sheehan	4:42
9.	"Opus Maximus" (Instrumental)	Instrumental	Sherinian, Thal, Portnoy, Sheehan	10:29
Total length:				57:35

== Critical reception ==
Professional ratings
Review scores
Source	Rating
Loudersound	positive
Metal Storm	8.3
Metal Injection	6.5/10
Blabbermouth.net	7.5/10

Loudersound's Fraser Lewry reviewed the album positively—stating that the band "is very much the sum of its parts. The musicians are as good as you'd expect, especially Portnoy, who almost seems to drag the rest of the band along with him, and Thal, whose playing veers from ugly metallic crunch to stunningly fluid solo.. (the album is) fierce, loud, bewildering, brilliantly performed and monstrously entertaining".

In a less favorable review for Metal Injection, Jordan Blum felt the album was competent overall but lacked originality. He said the album was "filled with in-your-face intricacy, uninspired lyricism, and raucous vocals, [...] packed with impressive performances from start to finish, as well as a few standout moments; however, it also fails to go beyond mere sufficiency in every respect, resulting in a forgettable effort that’s lazily innocuous and overwhelmingly familiar."

== Personnel ==
Sons of Apollo

- Jeff Scott Soto – lead vocals
- Ron "Bumblefoot" Thal – guitar, backing vocals
- Billy Sheehan – bass
- Derek Sherinian – keyboards, string arrangements on "God of the Sun" and "Labyrinth"
- Mike Portnoy – drums, backing vocals

Additional Musicians

- Ashwin Batish - sitar and chanting
- Keshav Batish - Tabla
- Artyom Manukyan - cello
- Armand Melnbardis - violin
- Kiara Perico - viola
- Enrico Cacace - additional orchestration

Production

- Mike Portnoy - production
- Derek Sherinian - production
- Jerry Guidroz - engineering
- Greg Foeller - assistant engineering
- Corey Mast, Brent Woods, Simone Sello, Thomas Cuce - additional engineering
- Jay Ruston - mixing
- Paul Logus - mastering
- Thomas Ewerhard - artwork and cover illustration
- Hristo Shindov - photography
