= Roman theatre of Philippopolis =

Ancient Roman theater in Plovdiv, Bulgaria

Ancient theatre of Philippopolis
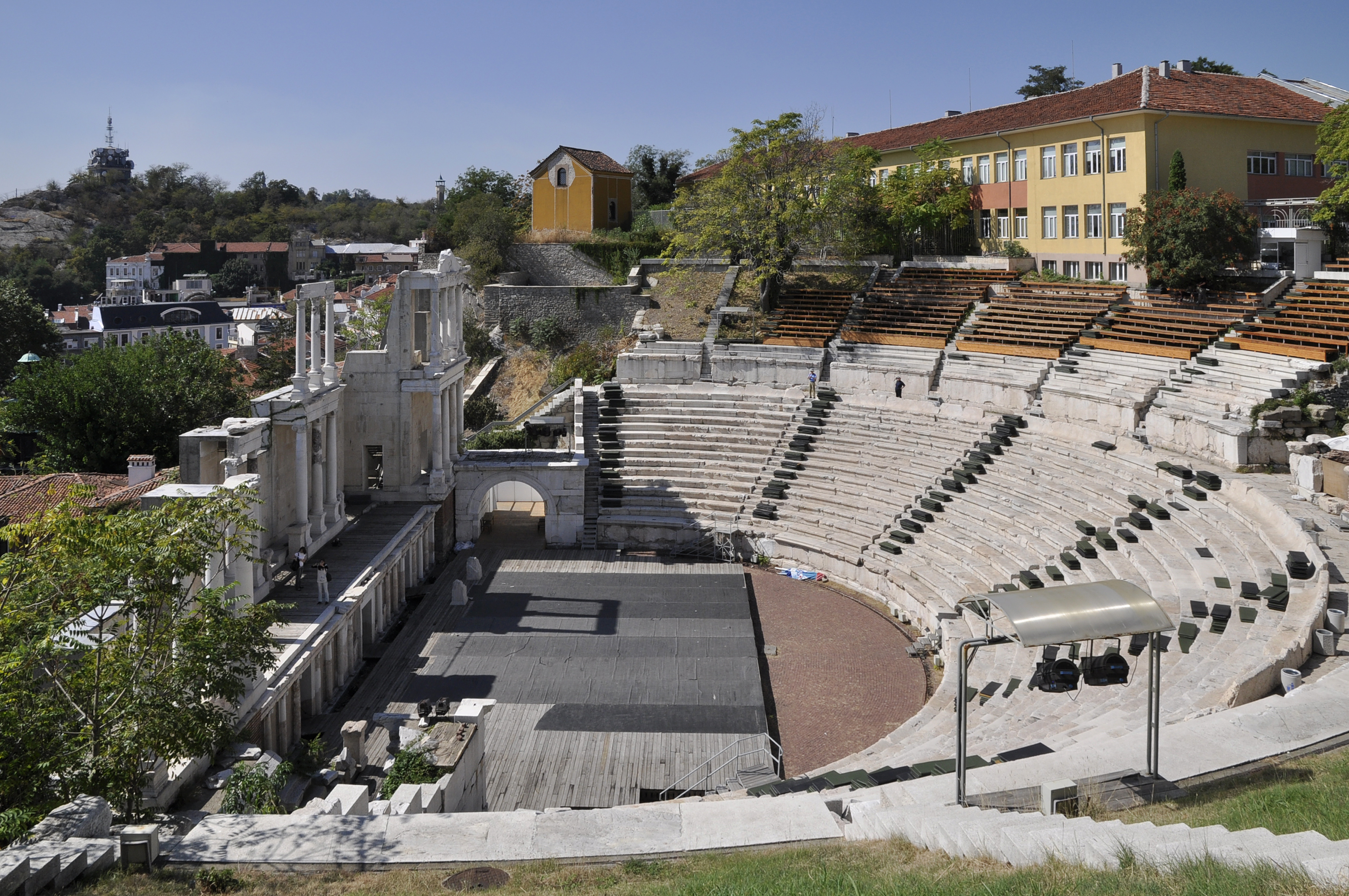

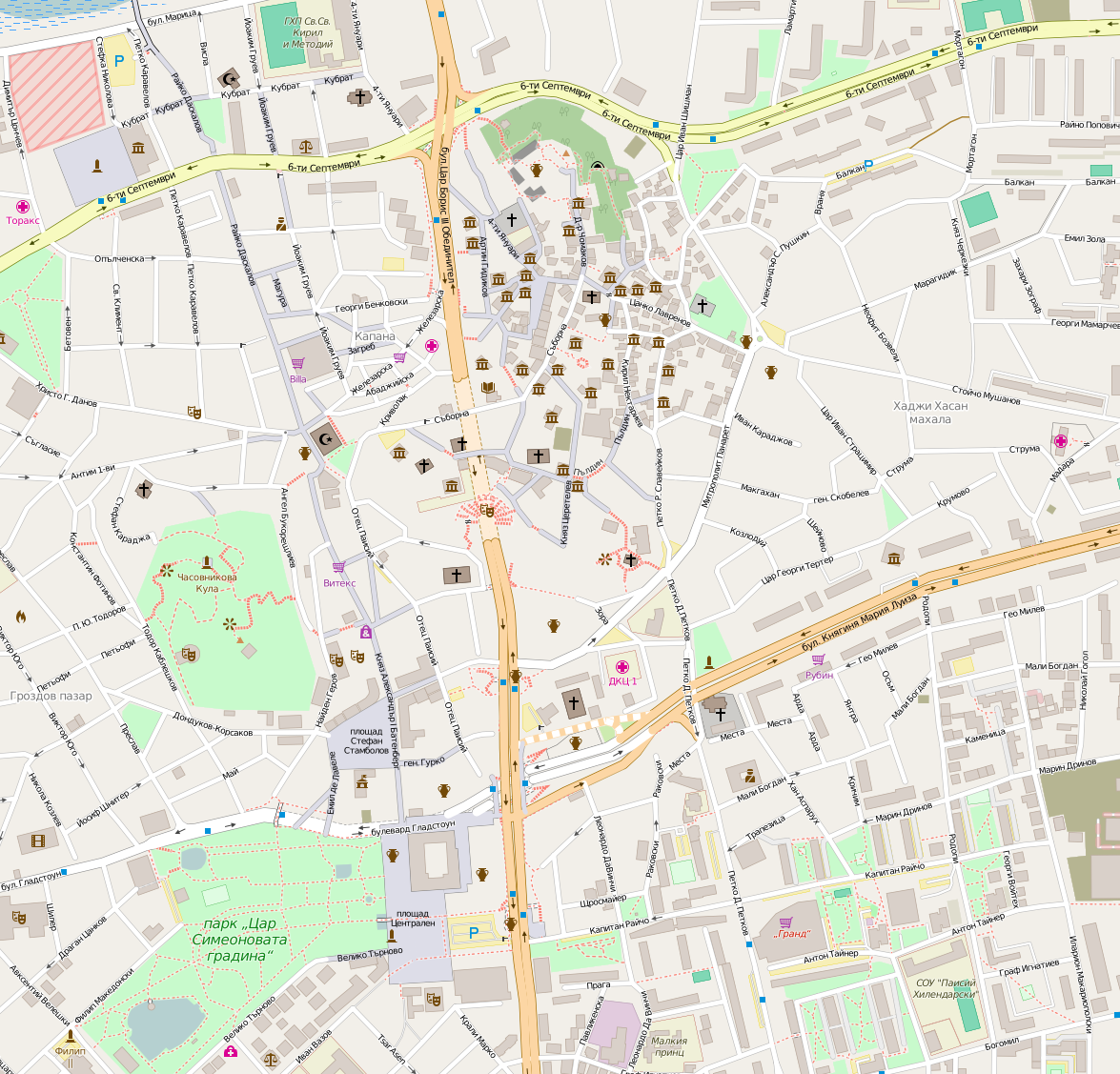
- Location within Plovdiv City Center
- 42.14684°N 24.751006°E
- Type: Theatre
- Periods: Roman Empire
- Location: Old Town, Plovdiv, Bulgaria

History
- Built: 1st century AD
- Built by: Marcus Ulpius Traianus

Site notes
- Material: bricks, marble
- Excavation dates: 1968 – 1979
- Condition: Restored
- Owner: Plovdiv Municipality
- Public access: Yes
- Website: http://www.visitplovdiv.com/en/node/522

The Roman theatre of Philippopolis (Latin: Theatrum Trimontense; Bulgarian: Пловдивски античен театър, Plovdivski antichen teatar) is one of the world's best-preserved ancient Roman theatres, located in the city center of modern Plovdiv, Bulgaria, once the ancient city of Philippopolis. It was constructed in the 1st century AD, probably during the reign of Domitian. The theatre can host between 5,000 and 7,000 spectators and it is currently in use.

== Description ==
The spectator seats are orientated to the south, towards the ancient city in the lowland and the Rhodope Mountains. In outline, the theatre is a semi-circle with an outer diameter of 82 meters. The theatre itself is divided into the seating section (cavea) and the stage (orchestra). The cavea, the area in which people gathered, is hollowed out of a hill or slope, while the outer radian seats required structural support and solid retaining walls. The cavea was not roofed. The spectator seats surround the stage (orchestra), which has the shape of a horseshoe, 26.64 meters long, includes 28 concentric rows of marble seats, divided into two tiers by an aisle (diazoma). The upper part of the tiers is interrupted by narrow radial stairways, which divide the cavea into wedge-shaped sectors (kerkides). The theatre also has a podium, which supports the columns of the scaenae frons.

The stage building – the scaenae frons – is south of the orchestra. It has three floors and is a high wall of the stage floor, supported by columns. The proscenium is a wall that supports the front edge of the stage with ornately decorated niches off to the sides. The proscaenium, which is 3.16 meters high, and its facade is decorated with an Ionic marble colonnade with triangular pediments. The facade of the scenae, which overlooks the spectators' area, consists of two two-storey porticos, the first in the Roman Ionic order and the second in the Corinthian order. The facade is cut through by three symmetrically located gates. The entrances to the orchestra, which are uncovered and vaulted, connect the cavea with the stage building. An underground vaulted passage begins from the centre of the orchestra, goes under the stage building and leads out of the theatre. Another vaulted passage, passing under the central bank of seats of the top tier, connects the cavea with the Three Hills area.

Similar to all the theatres on the territory of the Roman Empire, in the theatre of Trimontium the honorary spectator seats were inscribed. There were inscriptions not only for the representatives of the city council but also for magistrates, friends of the Emperor, etc. Some honorary inscriptions show that the building was used as the seat of the Thracian provincial assembly. Built with around 7,000 seats, each section of seating had the names of the city quarters engraved on the benches so the citizens knew where they were to sit.

Whereas Greeks preferred the exercises of gymnasium and stadium, Roman interest in sport went to the events at the theatre and circus. Thus, presumably, gladiatorial fights with animals were held in the theatre, as remains of safety facilities in front of the first row have been uncovered. These additions were set because of the visit of Emperor Caracalla to Trimontium in 214 AD.

The theatre was damaged in the 5th century AD by Attila the Hun.

The theatre was only found in the early 1970s due to a landslide. This caused a major archaeological excavation, including the removal of some 4.5 m of earth covering what was left hidden by the landslide. The restoration of the Roman theatre in Plovdiv is considered one of the best achievements of the Bulgarian Conservation School. The intervention is limited on the basis of rigorous tests and exclusion of assumptions. The reconstruction was made strictly according to the method of anastylosis and the new material is clearly visible. The theatre is one of the numerous constructions from the time of the Roman Empire, preserved in Bulgaria. There are several steles and wall inscriptions in Byzantine Greek language in the theatre.

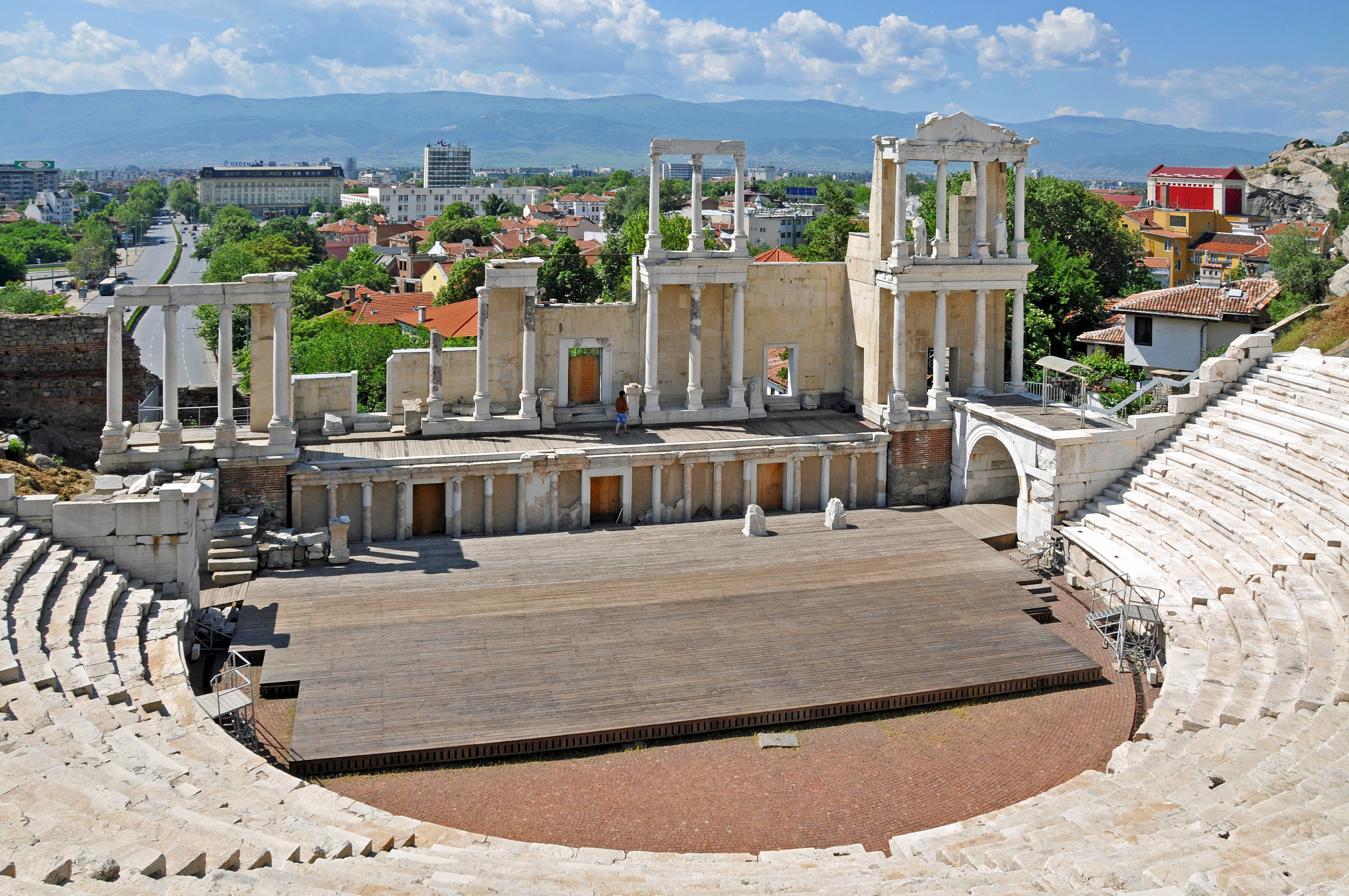
The stage building – the scaenae frons

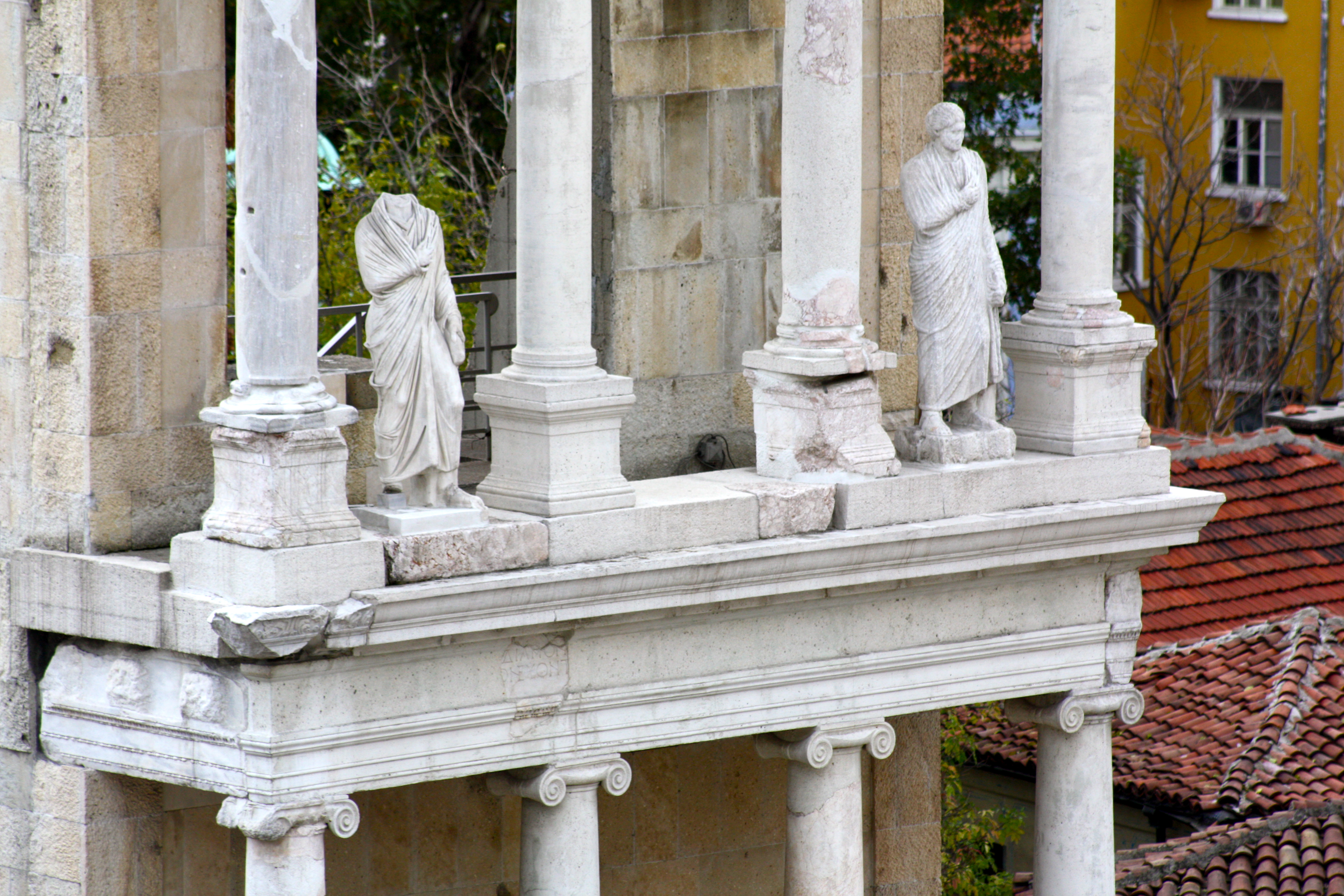
Statues - part of the decoration of the scaenae frons

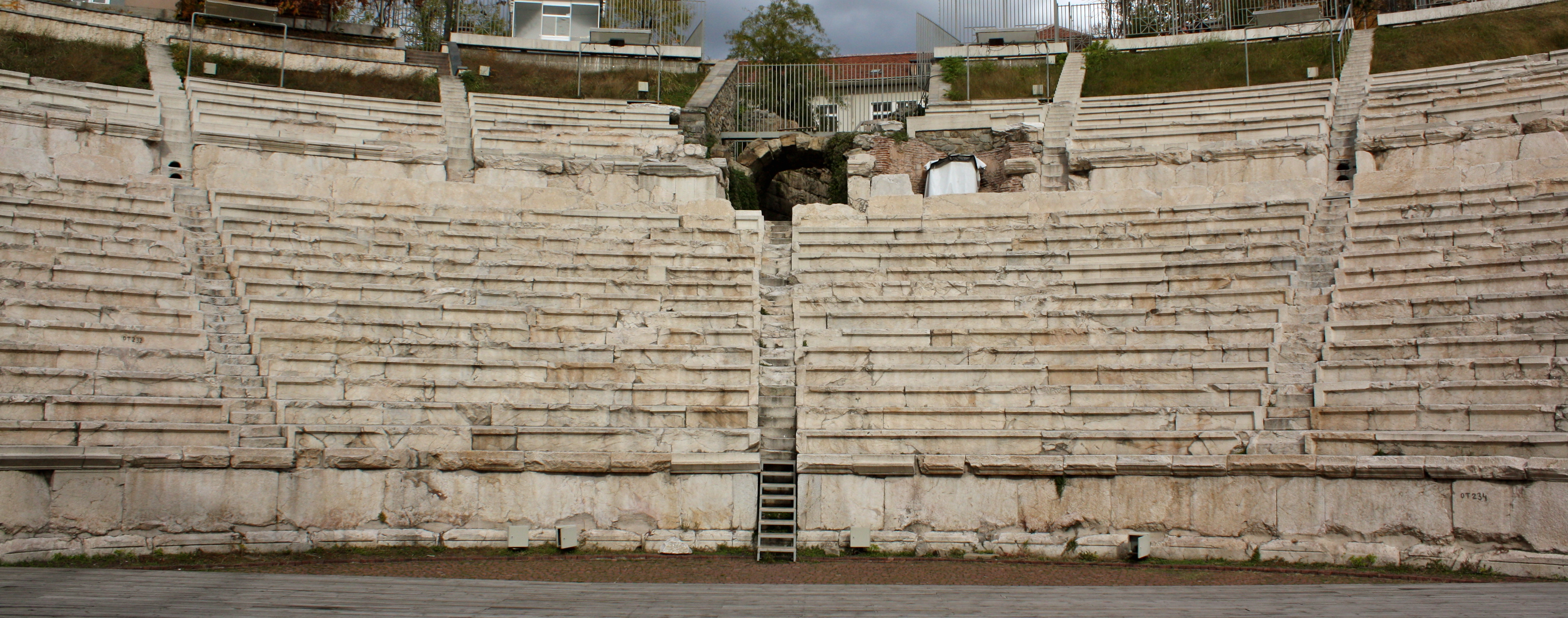
The spectator seats (cavea)

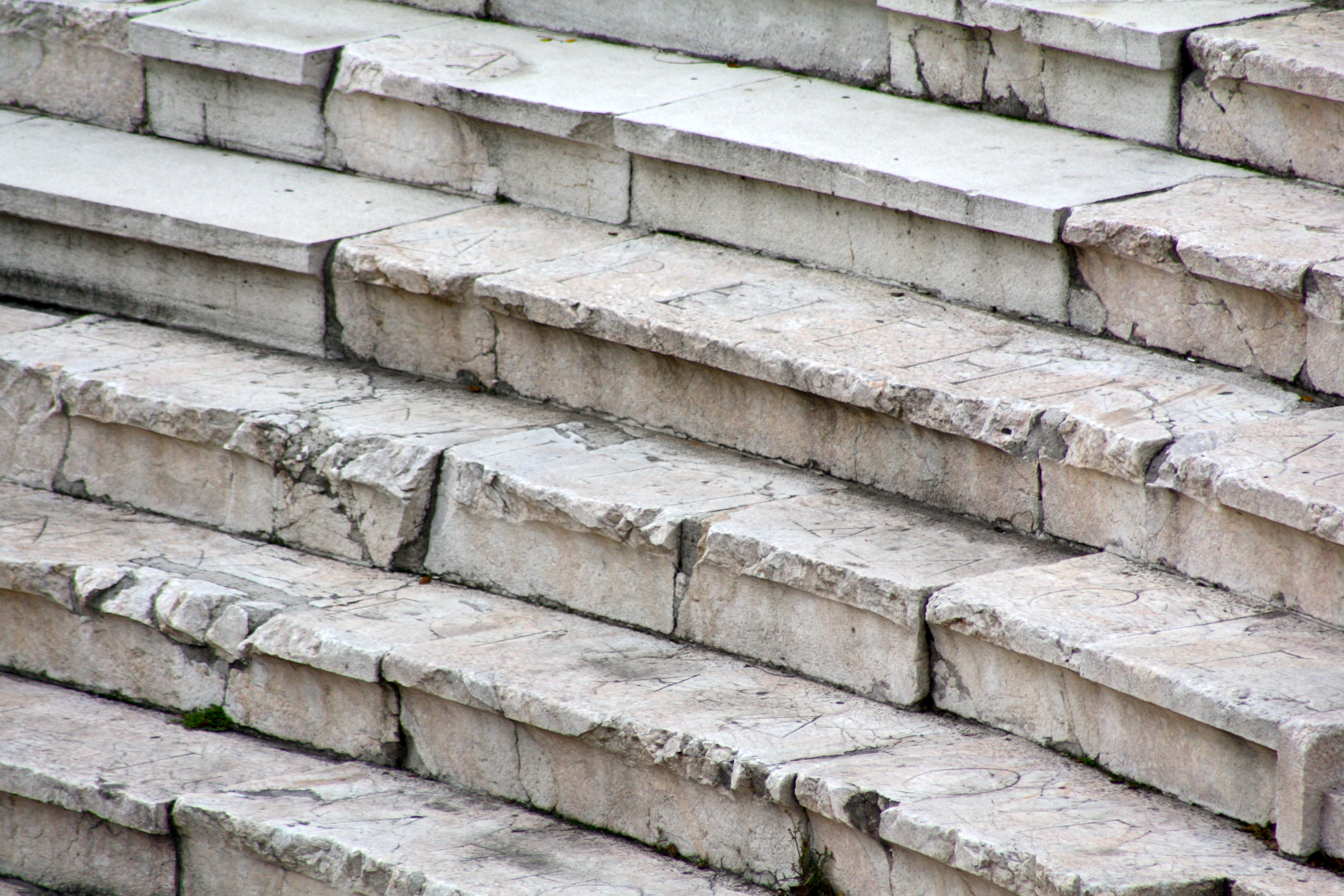
The marble seats with honorary inscriptions

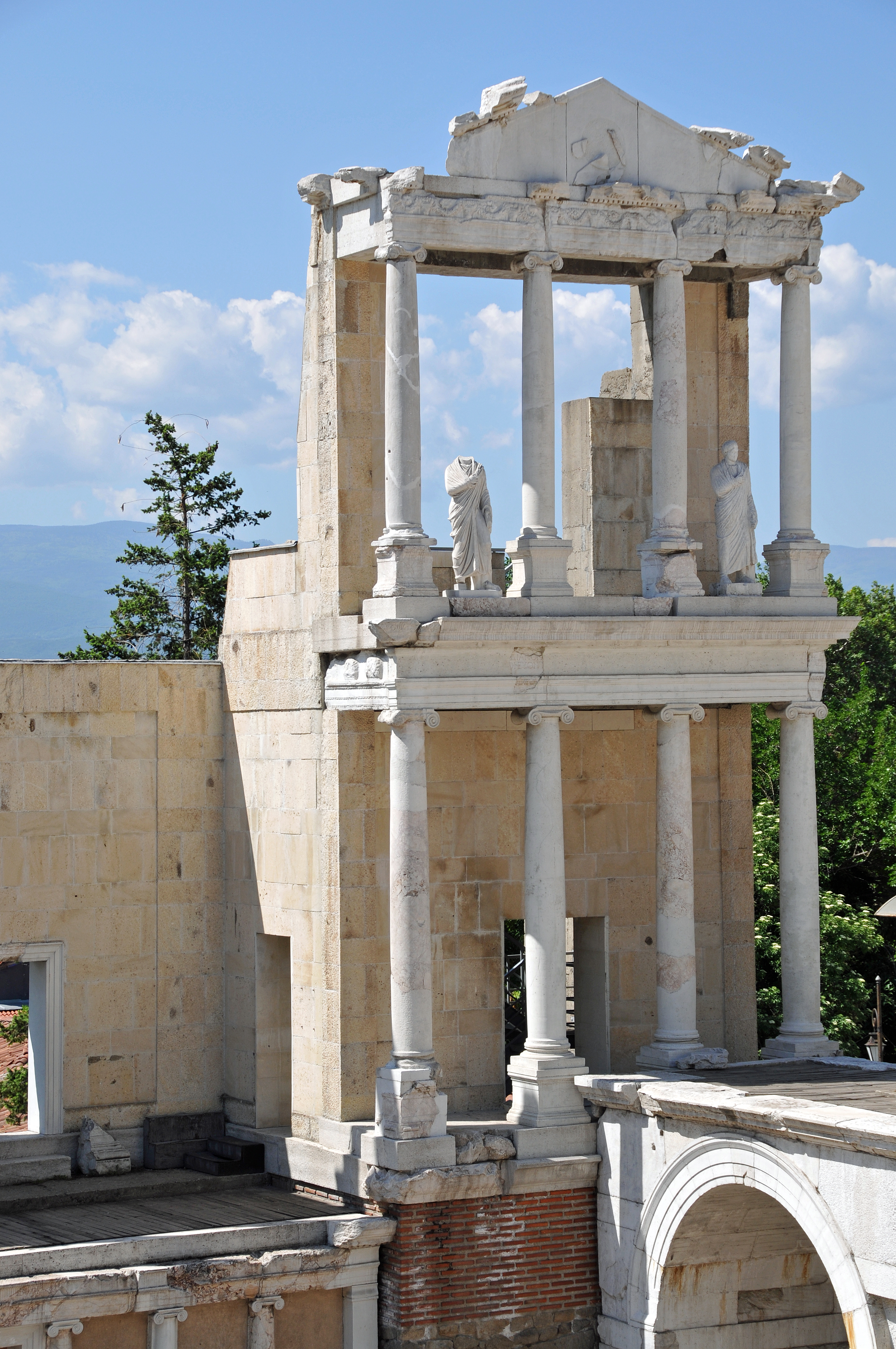
The scaenae frons and the Parodos

== Culture ==
During the summer months, the theatre hosts theatrical plays and musical shows.

The prize award ceremony of the 21st International Olympiad in Informatics was held in the theatre.

Heavy metal musician Devin Townsend recorded his 2018 live album Ocean Machine - Live at the Ancient Roman Theatre Plovdiv in the theatre, accompanied with the Plovdiv Opera's Orchestra and Choir. Progressive metal supergroup Sons of Apollo recorded their 2019 live album and concert film Live with the Plovdiv Psychotic Symphony at the theatre, also accompanied by the Plovdiv Opera's Orchestra and Choir. In 2025, King Gizzard & the Lizard Wizard played a three-night residency at the theatre and released the audio as a live album Live in Bulgaria '25, with the shows also livestreamed on YouTube.

== Restoration and conservation ==
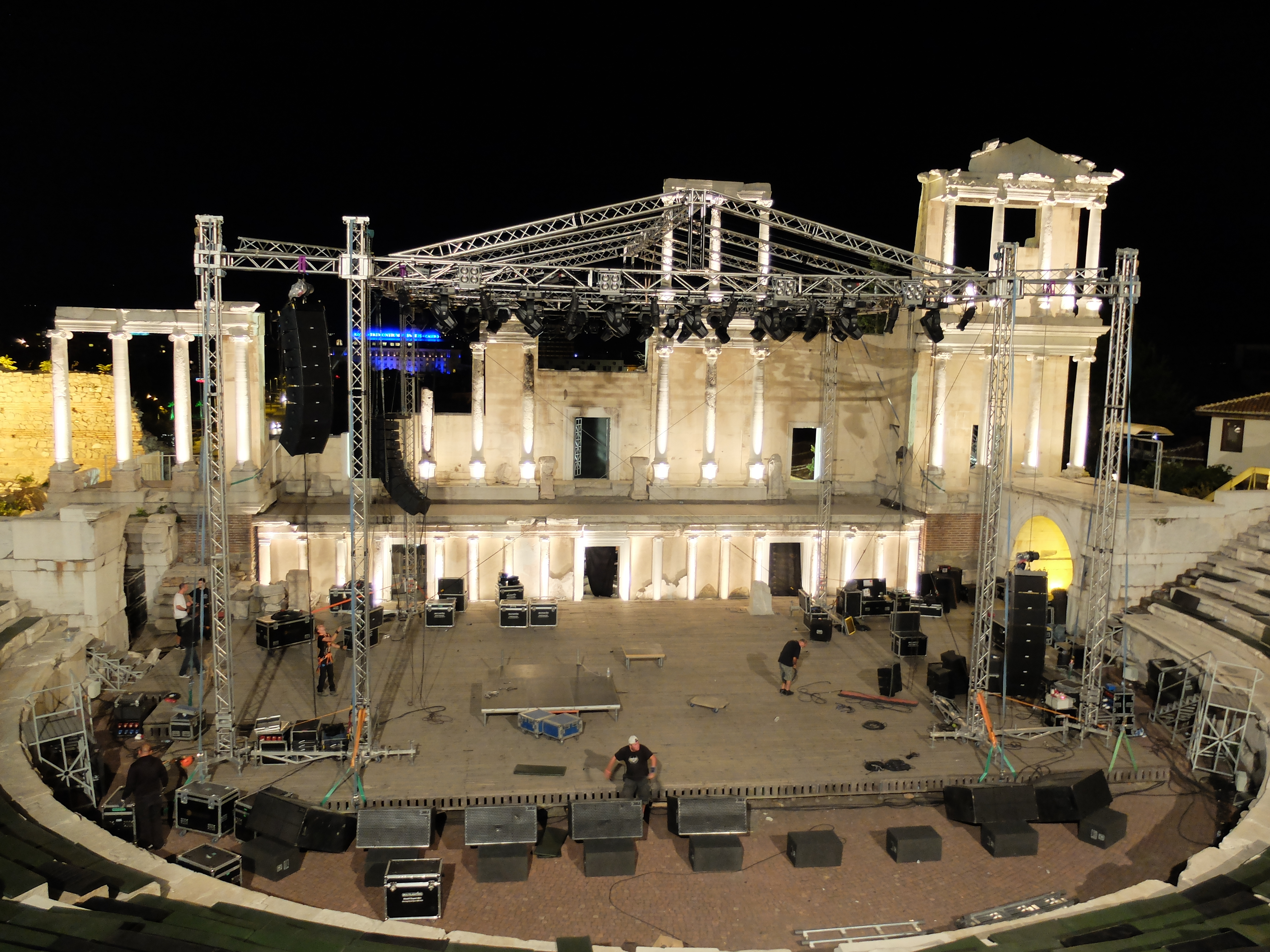
Concert preparations (2015)

At the end of the 4th century a large part of the theatre was destroyed (by either fire or earthquake). This was until the late 1960s when the ruins of the structure were found during archeological excavations in the region carried out by the Plovdiv archeological museum staff. The restoration of the ancient theatre is recognized as one of the greatest achievements in the conservation field in Bulgaria. The monument was restored using the original architectural elements to the greatest degree possible, strictly following the anastylosis technique.

Today, the ancient theatre is the most recognizable landmark of Plovdiv. It plays a significant part in the cultural life of the city (due mainly to the architecture of the monument and its good acoustics) and serves as a stage for plays, concerts, public events, etc. The theatre can accommodate up to 3,500 spectators.

Restoration of the ancient theatre

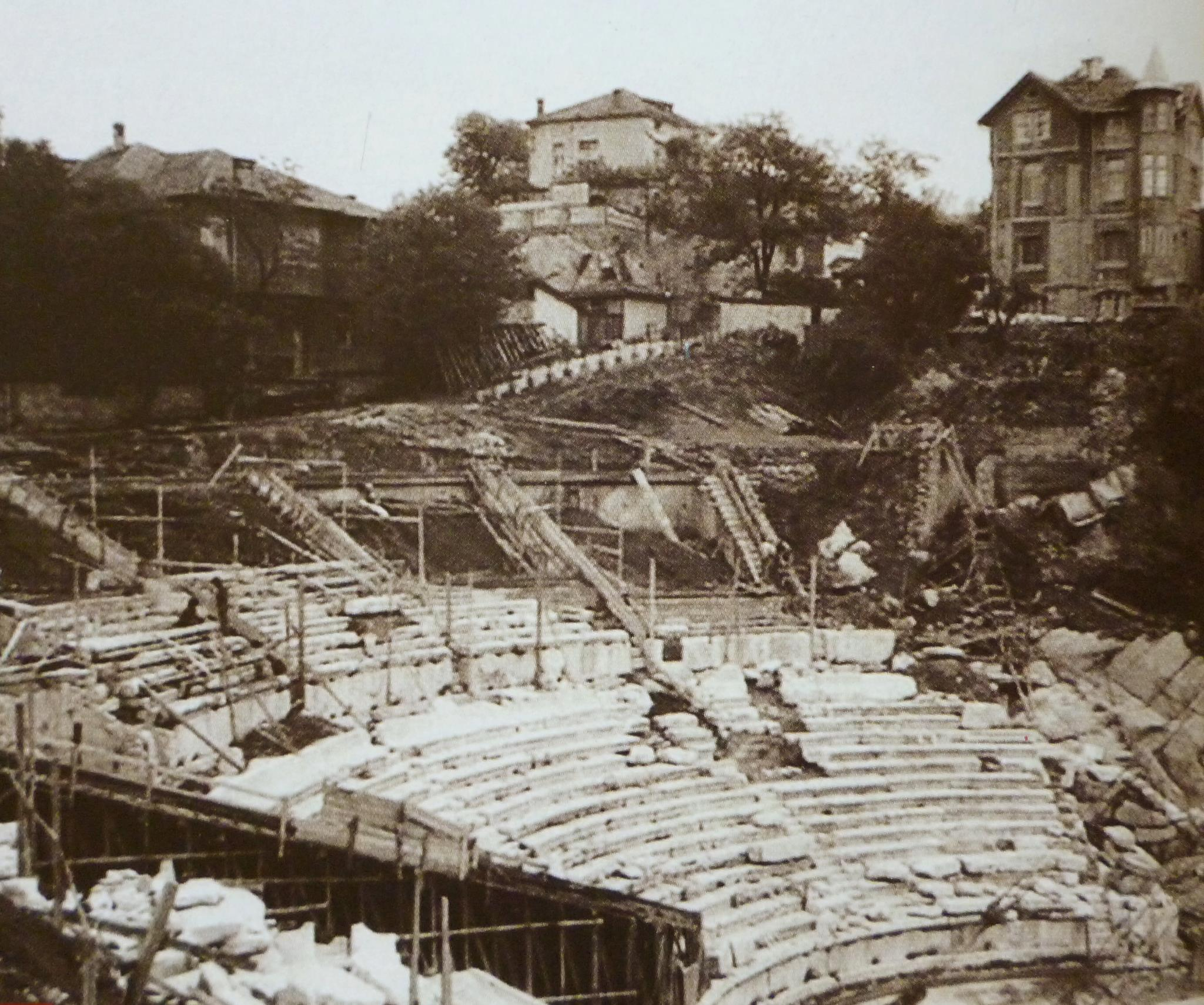

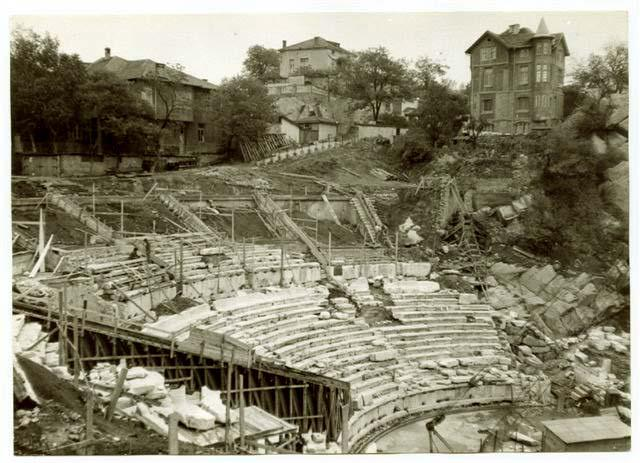

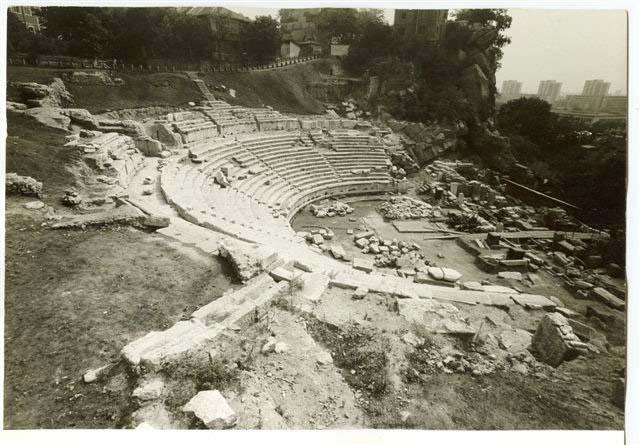

== Inscriptions from the theatre ==
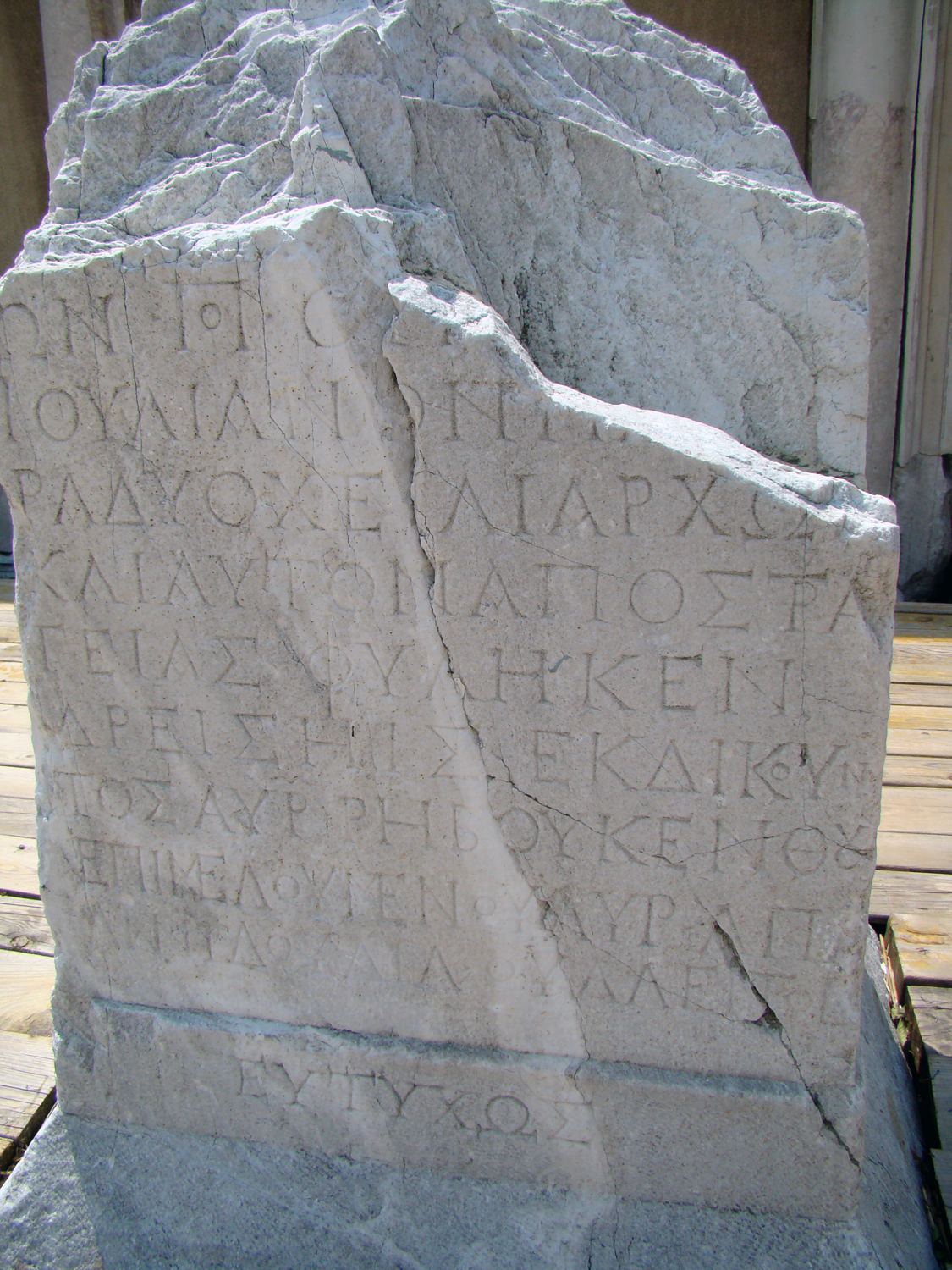
Stele with Byzantine Greek inscription from Plovdiv Ancient Theatre

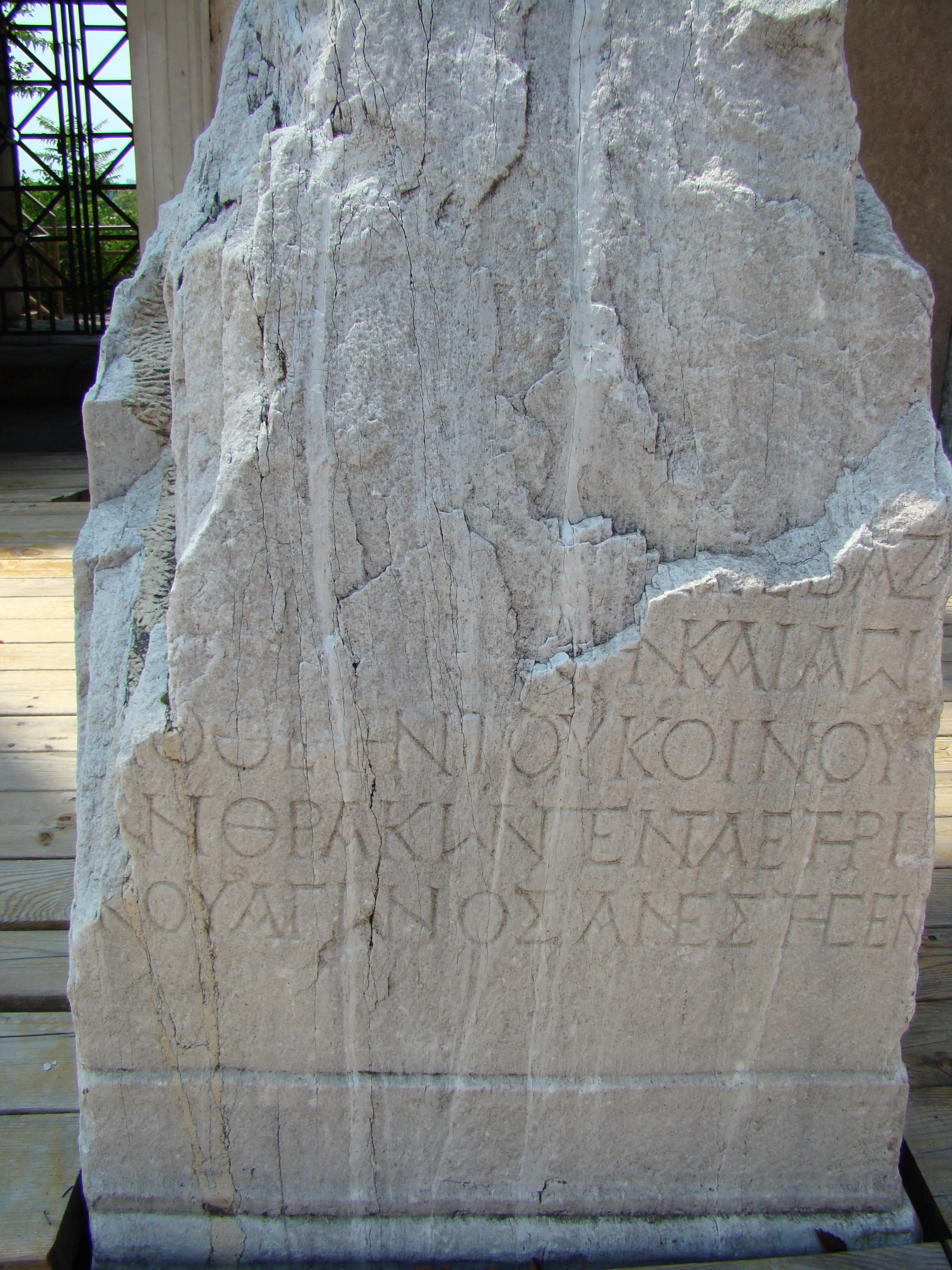

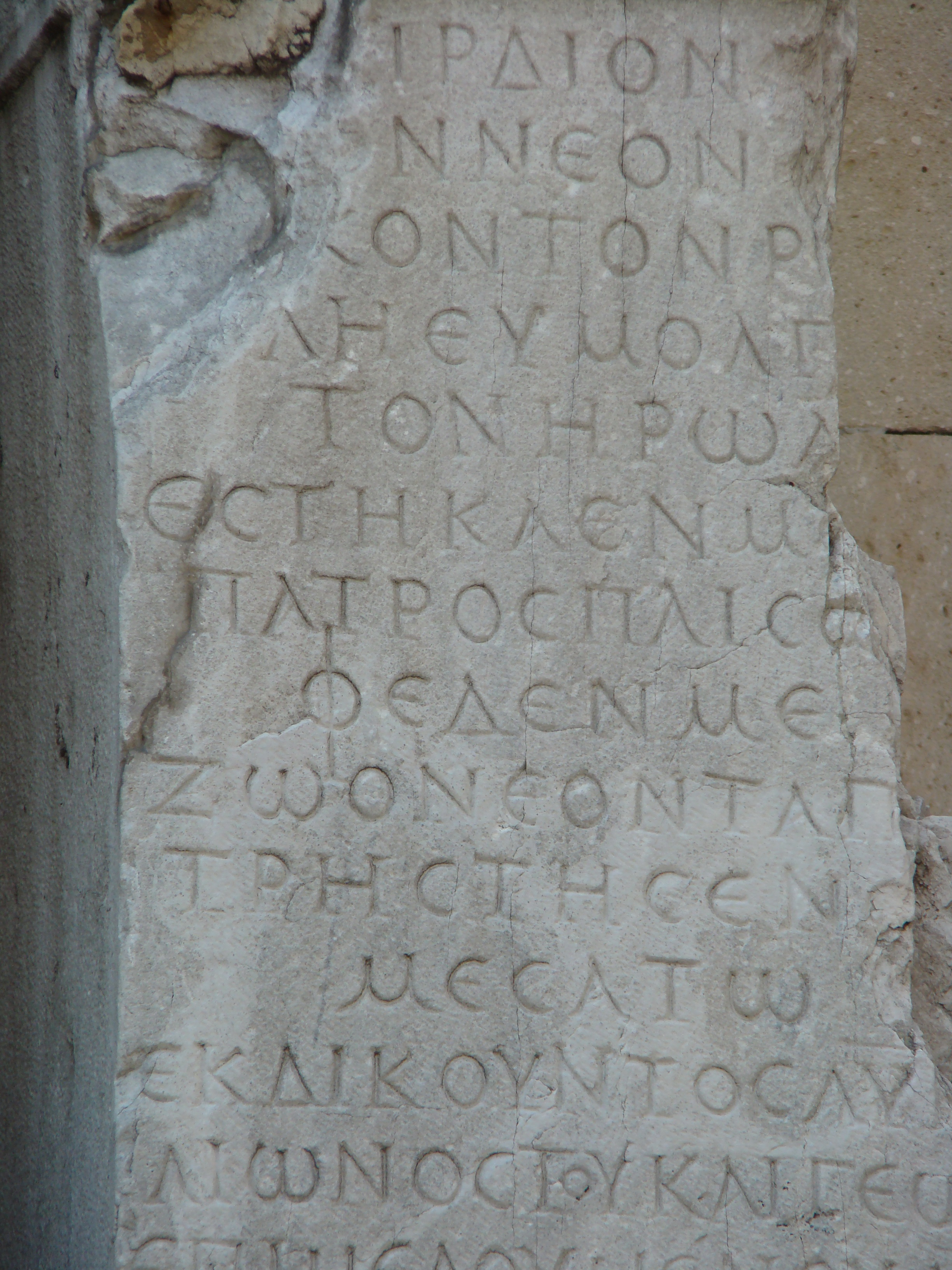

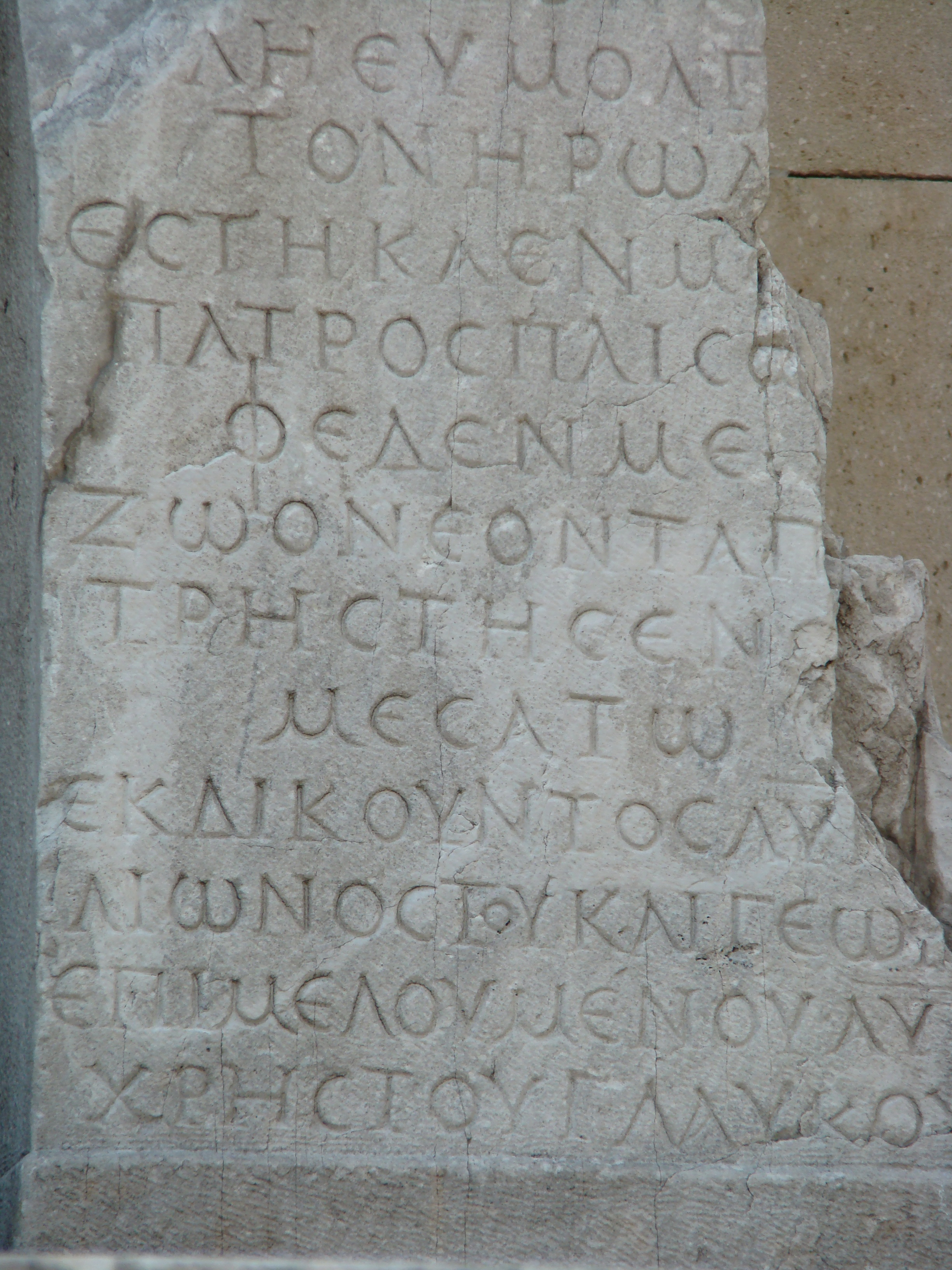
