= Protein (band) =

American punk, alternative, post-grunge, metal band

Protein was an American punk, alternative, post-grunge, metal band, formed in 1994 in San Francisco, California, United States.

Forming their first band after they were kicked out of a San Francisco-area high school, vocalist/guitarist Josh Zee (the son of a professional folksinger) and drummer Dan Thompson, played for several years in various local bands before forming the grungy alternative pop band, Protein, in 1994. The duo played several shows before replacing their part-time bassist with Russ Violet, and made a good showing at a San Francisco music-industry showcase in 1996. Signed to Sony's Work subsidiary, Protein released their debut album, Ever Since I Was a Kid, in 1997. A second album, Songs About Cowgirls, was released in 1999. They toured extensively throughout the U.S. on "The Warped Tour" and also toured Europe and Japan as part of MTV Asia Summer Fest.

== Members ==
- Josh Zee - Guitars/Vocals
- Russ Violet - Bass
- Dan (Danny) Thompson - Drums/Vocals

== Solo work ==
After their release from Sony in 2000, the members of the band moved onto other projects:

Josh Zee moved to the San Francisco Bay Area, where he met and collaborated with Teal Collins to form The Mother Truckers, a band that fused Southern rock, country, and blues. They then moved the band to Austin, Texas in 2005 and spent a decade, procuring a residency and grew a sizeable fanbase and released four albums: Something Worth Dying For, Broke, Not Broken, Let's All Go To Bed, and Van Tour. The Mother Truckers toured across the United States and Europe, performing with acts such as Willie Nelson, Merle Haggard, George Jones, Shooter Jennings, The Supersuckers, among others.

Russ Violet joined the San Francisco-based group The Monolith to record and release the 2004 album Here Comes The Monolith.

Dan Thompson joined Zee as drummer for The Mother Truckers from 2004 to 2007. During this time, he played with other musicians such as Les Claypool of Primus, Mark Rivera (Billie Joel), Vince Neil, Jakob Dylan, and Doug Grean. In 2008, he played drums for Scott Weiland on his solo album, "Happy" in Galoshes, touring the United States, and performing on TV shows such as The Tonight Show with Jay Leno, Jimmy Kimmel Live!, and Last Call with Carson Daly. In 2010, he joined The Alan Parsons Live Project.

== Discography ==
Album	Release date
Ever Since I Was a Kid	February 25, 1997
Songs About Cowgirls	July 13, 1999
