= Missing Cleveland =

Single by Scott Weiland

from the album "Happy" in Galoshes
- Released: November 11, 2008
- Recorded: Lavish Studios
- Genre: Alternative rock, emo
- Length: 4:12
- Label: Softdrive
- Songwriters: Scott Weiland and Doug Grean
- Producers: Scott Weiland and Doug Grean

Scott Weiland singles chronology
"Learning to Drive" (2007)	"Missing Cleveland" (2008)	"Paralysis" (2009)

"Missing Cleveland" is the first single from American rock musician Scott Weiland's second solo album, "Happy" in Galoshes. The single was released on November 11, 2008. In the United States, the song peaked at number 28 on the Modern Rock Chart.

The music video for "Missing Cleveland" was directed by Kevin Kerslake, who had worked with Weiland before. The video has been posted on YouTube.com for viewers to see.

== Chart performance ==
Chart (2008)	Peak position
US Alternative Airplay (Billboard)	28
