= A Compilation of Scott Weiland Cover Songs =

Compilation album by Scott Weiland
- Released: August 30, 2011
- Genre: Alternative rock
- Length: 53:23
- Label: Softdrive
- Producer: Scott Weiland

Scott Weiland chronology
"Happy" in Galoshes (2008)	A Compilation of Scott Weiland Cover Songs (2011)	The Most Wonderful Time of the Year (2011)

A Compilation of Scott Weiland Cover Songs is a compilation album by American vocalist Scott Weiland, released on August 30, 2011 by Softdrive Records. The album consists entirely of cover songs, featuring an array of covers of artists that inspired Weiland, such as David Bowie, The Beatles, Depeche Mode, The Rolling Stones, and The Smiths. The album was originally set to be released together with Weiland's memoir Not Dead & Not for Sale but Weiland decided later to release the album by itself exclusively in digital format.

The cover of the Beatles' "Revolution" is actually a recording by Weiland's group Stone Temple Pilots recording that was originally released as a single in 2001, in honor of 9/11, with proceeds going to the Twin Towers Fund.

"Reel Around the Fountain" and "Fame" previously appeared on Weiland's 2008 album "Happy" in Galoshes (the former only available on the "Deluxe" edition).

== Track listing ==
No.	Title	Writer(s)	Original artist (date)	Length
1.	"I Am the Resurrection"	Ian Brown, John Squire	The Stone Roses (1989)	5:54
2.	"Personality Crisis"	David Johansen, Johnny Thunders	New York Dolls (1973)	3:57
3.	"Frances Farmer Will Have Her Revenge on Seattle"	Kurt Cobain	Nirvana (1993)	4:14
4.	"Let Down"	Thom Yorke, Jonny Greenwood, Ed O'Brien, Colin Greenwood, Phil Selway	Radiohead (1997)	6:05
5.	"Into Your Arms"	Robyn St. Clare	Love Positions (1989)	2:49
6.	"Dead Flowers"	Mick Jagger, Keith Richards	The Rolling Stones (1971)	4:36
7.	"Waitin' for a Superman"	Wayne Coyne, Michael Ivins, Steven Drozd	The Flaming Lips (1999)	4:18
8.	"Revolution" (Stone Temple Pilots version)	John Lennon, Paul McCartney	The Beatles (1968)	3:37
9.	"But Not Tonight"	Martin Gore	Depeche Mode (1986)	4:50
10.	"Reel Around the Fountain"	Morrissey, Johnny Marr	The Smiths (1984)	5:18
11.	"Fame"	David Bowie, Carlos Alomar, John Lennon	David Bowie (1975)	3:26
12.	"The Jean Genie"	David Bowie	David Bowie (1973)	4:19

== Personnel ==
- Scott Weiland – lead vocals, keyboards, piano
- Doug Grean – guitar, bass
- Adrian Young – drums, percussion
- Michael Weiland – drums
- Matt O'Connor – drums, percussion
- Dean DeLeo – guitar on track 8
- Robert DeLeo – bass on track 8
- Eric Kretz – drums on track 8
