= Bug (soundtrack) =

Soundtrack album by Various artists
- Released: May 22, 2007
- Genre: Soundtrack
- Length: 34:53
- Label: Lionsgate Records; Sony Music Entertainment; RED Distribution
- Producer: Various artists

Singles from Bug (soundtrack)
- 1. "Beautiful Day" Released: 2007

Bug is the original soundtrack album, on the Lionsgate label, of the 2006 film Bug, and contains such artists as Sean & Sara Watkins (of Nickel Creek), Chainsaw Kittens, Susan Tedeschi, Jerry Leiber, Leon Russell and more. The theme from Bug is performed by System of a Down lead singer Serj Tankian. The lead track is performed by Stone Temple Pilots lead singer Scott Weiland.

The original score is composed by Brian Tyler. The score was released on iTunes on May 22, 2007. The soundtrack by various artists, was released in stores and on iTunes on May 22.

== Track listing ==
1. "Beautiful Day" - 5:09 - Scott Weiland (of Stone Temple Pilots) - previously unreleased
2. "No Way to Live" - 2:06 Sean & Sara Watkins (of Nickel Creek) - previously unreleased
3. "She Gets" - 2:33 Chainsaw Kittens - Flipped Out in Singapore (1992)
4. "Cowboy Boots" - 2:47 The Backsliders - Throwin' Rocks At The Moon (1997)
5. "I Fell in Love" - 3:28 Susan Tedeschi - Wait for Me (2002)
6. "Shake 'em Up and Let 'em Roll" - 2:31 Jerry Leiber and The Coasters - 50 Coastin' Classics (1992)
7. "Searchin'" - 2:39 Alvin Robinson - "Something You Got" / "Searchin'" (1964)
8. "Viva Mi Sinaloa" - 3:17 Los Tigres del Norte - Directo al Corazon (2005)
9. "This Masquerade" - 4:22 Leon Russell - Carney (1972)
10. "Drug" - 2:33 Brian Tyler - previously unreleased
11. "Peterception" - 3:01 Brian Tyler - previously unreleased
12. "Bug Theme" - 1:31 Serj Tankian (of System of a Down) - previously unreleased

Songs in the movie but not on the soundtrack include:

- "Disappearing Act" (C. Cornell) - Chris Cornell - previously unreleased
- "Innermission" (S. Tankian, P. Jolly) - Serj Tankian, Petra Jolly - previously unreleased
- "Kick Kid" (T. Meade) - Chainsaw Kittens - Angel on the Range (EP) (1993)

== Personnel ==
- Chris Bellman – Mastering
- Chris Fagot – Soundtrack Coordination
- Jay Faires – Music Supervisor, Soundtrack Producer, Music Executive
- David Falzone – Film Music Supervisor
- Jeanne Fay – Music Clearance
- Tricia Holloway – Film Music Supervisor
- Serj Tankian – Additional Music
- Brian Tyler – Composer

=== Score ===
Bug: Original Film Score

Film score by Brian Tyler
- Released: May 22, 2007
- Length: 61:52
- Label: Lionsgate
- Producer: Brian Tyler

Brian Tyler chronology
Partition (2007)	Bug: Original Film Score (2007)	War (2007)

Professional ratings
Review scores
Source	Rating
Soundtrack.Net	3/5 stars

The film is scored by Brian Tyler and the musical direction/supervision is by Jay Faires. The score is released as digital download on May 22, 2007.

Track listing

All music is composed by Brian Tyler.

No.	Title	Length
1.	"Bug Part I: Birth"	2:00
2.	"Bug Part II: Life"	6:07
3.	"Bug Part III: Death"	3:42
4.	"Nocturne for Lloyd"	2:36
5.	"Mantra"	2:29
6.	"Drug"	2:34
7.	"Phonescape"	4:21
8.	"The Temptation of Dr. Sweet"	6:23
9.	"Aphids"	5:13
10.	"The Theory of Agnes"	4:25
11.	"The Motel in Oklahoma"	3:31
12.	"The Solution of Fire"	6:55
13.	"Millions"	3:43
14.	"Conception"	4:50
15.	"Peterception"	3:03
Total length:		61:52
