= Mike Avenaim =

- Born: Michael Avenaim Sydney, Australia
- Genres: Pop, Rock, Folk, Jazz, Soundtrack
- Occupations: Mixing Engineer, Session Musician, Music Director, Music Producer
- Instruments: Drums, Guitar, Programming
- Website: mikeavenaim.com

Mike Avenaim, born Michael Avenaim in Sydney, is an Australian-American Mixing Engineer, Session Drummer, Music Director and Music Producer.

== Early life and background ==
From an early age, Avenaim began studying classical percussion and ranked in several Australian classical competitions. As a teenager, his focus shifted to the drum set and as his education continued, he was granted a scholarship to the Australian Institute of Music where he majored in contemporary performance and Jazz. Since living in America, he has been on multiple national and international tours with Jorge Blanco, Emblem3 on the Selena Gomez Stars Dance Tour, Scott Weiland, Troy Harley, Zella Day and many others. He has also appeared on such shows as: Last Call With Carson Daly, Late Night With Seth Meyers, Good Morning America, The View, Hey Hey It's Saturday and The Arsenio Hall Show. Avenaim is the current Music Director for a various Hollywood Records artists as well as multiple independent acts.

== Popular music ==
In 2013, Avenaim began playing in the pop band Emblem3. As of 2014, he also performed and composed for Scott Weiland. Avenaim is the current Music Director/Drummer for Hollywood Records artists, Jorge Blanco, Bea Miller and Temecula Road as well as Island Records artist NOTD.

== Endorsements ==
Avenaim is currently endorsed by Ludwig Drums, Istanbul Agop Cymbals, Remo, and Vater.

== Composition and production work ==
In 2009, Avenaim composed and produced the single "He Won't Forget You", performed by Chase Masterson, for the film Yesterday Was a Lie. The track was released by La-La Land Records. He has also produced and recorded radio and internet campaigns for Outback Steakhouse, compositions for Fox Sports, and the film Center Stage: Turn It Up.

Avenaim provided the original score for the 2013 short film R.U.R.: Genesis.

In 2015, Scott Weiland released his album Blaster (Scott Weiland album); Avenaim recorded drums on four tracks as well as co-writing the song "Amethyst". Since then, Avenaim has composed, produced and recorded music for clients including: Disney, MTV, VH1, CMT, National Geographic and many more.
