= Beautiful Day (Scott Weiland song) =

Single by Scott Weiland

from the album Bug (soundtrack) and "Happy" in Galoshes
- Released: 2007
- Genre: Alternative rock
- Length: 5:09
- Songwriters: Doug Grean, Scott Weiland

Scott Weiland singles chronology
| "Barbarella" (1998) | "Beautiful Day" (2007) | "Missing Cleveland" (2008) |

"Beautiful Day" is an alternative rock song written by Scott Weiland (of Stone Temple Pilots and Velvet Revolver). The song is the first track on the soundtrack for the movie Bug. Bug is a psychological thriller, directed by William Friedkin (The Exorcist), released on May 25, 2007.

The single is a remake of a Stone Temple Pilots outtake called "Learning To Drive". The title of the 2007 single was first reported to be called "Beautiful Day", but more recent sources reported it to be "Learning to Drive".

Scott told Hollywood Exclusive that "the song we wrote is almost perfect for the film because, on one end, it's beautiful and almost pristine -- and on the other side of things, it's really twisted and it's like you're on a psychotic roller coaster ride in slow motion".

The song, as "Beautiful Day" (not "Learning to Drive"), appears on Weiland's second solo album, "Happy" in Galoshes.

== Stone Temple Pilots ==
Scott Weiland wrote the initial song version when he was the lead singer of Stone Temple Pilots. The unreleased song came from the Nº 4 sessions (1999).

== See also ==
- "She Builds Quick Machines"
- Bug (2007 soundtrack)
