= Learning to Drive =

Learning to Drive may refer to:

- Learning to Drive (film), a 2014 film
- "Learning to Drive" (song), song by Scott Weiland
