= The Most Wonderful Time of the Year (Scott Weiland album) =

Studio album by Scott Weiland
- Released: October 4, 2011
- Recorded: 2009–2011
- Genre: Christmas music
- Length: 31:22
- Label: Softdrive/Atco

Scott Weiland chronology
A Compilation of Scott Weiland Cover Songs (2011)	The Most Wonderful Time of the Year (2011)	Blaster (2015)

Alternative cover
- Cover of deluxe edition release

Professional ratings
Review scores
Source	Rating
AllMusic	3.5/5 stars
Snobsmusic.net	5/10
Atlanta Music Guide	(positive)

The Most Wonderful Time of the Year is the third and final solo album from former Stone Temple Pilots and Velvet Revolver lead singer Scott Weiland. It features his versions of traditional Christmas songs. A deluxe edition of the album was released on November 4, 2022.

The album idea originated from a 2006 performance of "Have Yourself a Merry Little Christmas" that Weiland sang on the Jay Leno Show, a clip of which was released on the official Scott Weiland YouTube channel on December 1, 2025.

In 2014, Tom Hawking of Flavorwire included the album in his list of "The 50 Worst Albums Ever Made", in which he wrote: "Only a cynic would suggest that he did this because he needed drug money, but... oh, OK, fine, he probably did this because he needed drug money."

== Promotion ==
Milwaukee radio station WLUM-FM 102.1 produced "A Very Scott Weiland Christmas," in which they played the album repeatedly for 24 hours starting Christmas Eve and ending on Christmas Day.

== Music videos ==
On November 17, 2011, an official music video was published for "Winter Wonderland" on the Stone Temple Pilots YouTube channel. The video description states:

The official music video for Scott Weiland's "Winter Wonderland," his rock interpretation of the classic holiday song originally written by Felix Bernard and Richard B. Smith in 1934. This version appeared on Weiland's 2011 holiday album "The Most Wonderful Time of the Year." Weiland recorded the album with his band at Lavish Studios in California, putting his distinctive rock twist on traditional Christmas classics. The album featured both traditional holiday standards and original compositions. Weiland's "Winter Wonderland" showcases his versatility as a vocalist, moving from hard rock into seasonal music while maintaining his unique style. The holiday album was one of Weiland's solo projects during his career beyond Stone Temple Pilots.

An official lyric video was published on the RHINO YouTube channel for the "Happy Xmas (War is Over)" deluxe album song in September 2022.

== Release history ==
On November 4 2022 a deluxe version was released in two vinyl versions with limited editions of both red and green albums. The "newly expanded" album contains previously unreleased tracks including "Happy Christmas (War is Over)" and studio rehearsal versions of "White Christmas" and "Winter Wonderland." The new release tracks were recorded at Weiland's Lavish music studio.

As of December 2025 the "red" deluxe album is still available for order on the Scott Weiland Official Website and sells for $25.00. The website notes that the deluxe album is the "first posthumous music to be released from the Weiland vault."

== Track Listing (Original) ==
No.	Title	Composer(s)	Length
1.	"The Christmas Song"	Mel Torme, Robert Wells	3:23
2.	"I'll Be Home for Christmas"	Kim Gannon	3:05
3.	"White Christmas"	Irving Berlin	2:37
4.	"Silent Night"	Franz Gruber, Joseph Mohr	3:07
5.	"It's The Most Wonderful Time of the Year"	Edward Pola, George Wyle	2:31
6.	"What Child is This?"	William Chatterton Dix	3:39
7.	"Winter Wonderland"	Felix Bernard, Richard B. Smith	2:21
8.	"Have Yourself A Merry Little Christmas"	Ralph Blane, Hugh Martin	2:57
9.	"Happy Christmas and Many More"	Doug Grean, Scott Weiland	3:29
10.	"O Holy Night"	Adolphe Adam, John Sullivan Dwight	4:13
