= Jeff Hart and the Ruins =

Jeff Hart and the Ruins were a four-piece Americana and alt.country-styled power pop band composed of Jeff Hart (musician), Brian Yamamoto, Symen Blumenfeld and John Flowers. After 23 years under that name, they became Jefferson Hart & The Ghosts of the Old North State in January 2013.

== Career ==
Jeff Hart and the Ruins was formed in January 1990 by Jeff Hart, along with bassist Chip Robinson and drummer John Flowers. As with musical predecessors The Byrds, Tom Petty, and The Kinks (Muswell Hillbillies era) and contemporaries like Paul Westerberg and The Jayhawks, the music of the band strays into both the "alt.country" and power pop styles of rock and roll. Don Bailey later joined the original three to round out the first era of the band.

=== Jeff Hart: The Singles 1960-1990 ===
Their debut CD was released in November 1990 and entitled Jeff Hart: The Singles 1960-1990 (Bombay Records ABR-001). Though Jeff Hart and the Ruins played live in support of the CD, the recordings were essentially a solo anthology of studio material that Hart wrote and sang from his previous bands. This consisted of selections from the North Carolina alt.country pioneers The Hanks, The Ragdads and some acoustic sessions at Duck Kee Studio with Jerry Kee, Ron Bartholomew, Chip Robinson, Danny Moses and Steve Howell.

=== Glances From a Nervous Groom ===
Following the departure of Robinson, Bailey and Flowers in 1991, numerous members (notably Dave Bartholomew of Tres Chicas and Danny Kurtz of Whiskeytown and The Backsliders) and bassist Thomas Wilson filled their roles in the short term. Beginning in 1994, a core lineup of Brian Yamamoto on guitar and vocals, Glenn Jones on bass and vocals and Bryan Sodemann on drums and vocals held steady until 1996.

The next CD, Glances From a Nervous Groom (Bombay Records ABR-002), was released in December 1995 and recorded with this new lineup. It was the first (and to date only) CD credited to Jeff Hart and the Ruins.

Eric Midkiff replaced Glenn Jones in the band in 1996 and played guitar while Hart moved to bass. After Midkiff's departure in 1996, Steve Hisada replaced him on guitar and occasional bass while Hart split bass and guitar duties with Hisada. Jeff Hart and the Ruins disbanded in July 1998.

== Reunion ==
After a five-year hiatus, Midkiff rejoined the band for their reunion in April 2003 with Symen Blumenfeld on bass along with previous members Hart, Yamamoto and Sodemann. Midkiff took time off again in 2008. Original drummer John Flowers rejoined briefly in 2010 and upon his departure, he was replaced by Jim McPhail. McPhail departed in July 2012 and Flowers re-joined. The Ruins also appear on 7 of the 14 songs (Goodbye Anne Shore Goodbye, All Along the Wallflower, View Ye Living, Love in Return, Better Days, Margarite and Walking Between Raindrops)on Hart's December 2011 CD release "Ghosts of the Old North State". The Hart, Yamamoto, Blumenfeld and Flowers was intact until Flowers departed in early 2016 (replaced by Randy Benefield) and the death of Blumenfeld in April 2019 (replaced by Hart's daughter Ella that summer).

"You and Your Kind", a song Hart wrote while with The Hanks, but played for the better part of a decade with The Ruins, was featured in the "Betty and Veronica" episode in the first season of the WB Network show Veronica Mars. The recording used was from a 2003 live CD by The Brown Mountain Lights, Late Show at the Cave (ABR-003).

Jeff Hart's songs "Love In Return" and "So Old" have also been covered live by Chris Stamey and Chip Robinson in the Vibekillers respectively.

== Jefferson Hart & The Ghosts of the Old North State ==
The band renamed itself after 23 years as Jeff Hart and the Ruins to Jefferson Hart and The Ghosts of the Old North State (after the album of the same name) in February 2013. Jeff has also been playing solo under the name Jefferson Hart since early in 2013. Drummer Randy Benefield replaced John Flowers who left in early 2016. Symen Blumenfeld, bassist since 2003, died in April 2019. Hart's daughter Ella replaced him in the summer of 2019.

In 2014, Jefferson Hart and The Ghosts of the Old North State released, Corolla Ponies In The Snow, which was the culmination of a 12-week song writing project in which Jeff wrote a song a week for 12 weeks and posted them to SoundCloud. The title track was inspired by a YouTube video of ponies running on the North Carolina Outer Banks during a snow storm.

== Sources ==
- No Depression issue
- Another No Depression issue
- Allmusic.com
- Paisleypop.com
- Indyweek.com 5 January 2005
- Indyweek.com 12 February 2003
- Indyweek.com 13 February 2002
- Drivemagazine.net Archived December 15, 2007, at the Wayback Machine
- Indyweek.com 16 January 2002
- Veronica Music
- TV.com Veronica Mars
- UPN.com Veronica Mars
- SmirkingChimp.com
- Mebtel.net (Studio)
- Mebtel.net
- iPass.net Archived May 30, 2006, at the Wayback Machine
- Compilation of print-only reviews from 1995 - 2006 from No Depression, Jem (Japan), Big Takeover (NYC), Circus (Britain), Midwestern Skies (Sweden), Not Lame (Denver, Co.), Paisley Pop (Portland, OR), News and Observer (Raleigh, NC), The Independent (Durham, NC).
- Jeff Hart, The Brown Mountain Lights, The Frosted Sugar Bombs, Chris Stamey, Arrogance, Veronica Mars.
