= "Happy" in Galoshes =

Studio album by Scott Weiland
- Released: November 25, 2008
- Recorded: Early 2000s – 2008
- Genres: Alternative rock; neo-psychedelia
- Length: 52:00 (regular); 90:19 (deluxe edition)
- Label: Softdrive
- Producers: Doug Grean, Scott Weiland

Scott Weiland chronology
12 Bar Blues (1998)	"Happy" in Galoshes (2008)	A Compilation of Scott Weiland Cover Songs (2011)

"Happy" in Galoshes is the second solo album by American rock singer Scott Weiland. Weiland, known for his roles as the lead singer in Stone Temple Pilots and Velvet Revolver, released his first album, 12 Bar Blues in 1998. Ten years later, "Happy" in Galoshes served as the official follow-up.

Two versions were released, a single-disc and double-disc deluxe version (the deluxe edition offers a second disc of 10 extra tracks). The album was released November 25, 2008, on Weiland's own Softdrive Records. Produced by Doug Grean and Weiland, with select tracks recorded by Steve Albini, the album features guest appearances by Paul Oakenfold and No Doubt members Adrian Young, Tony Kanal, and Tom Dumont. Oakenfold appears on a cover of David Bowie's "Fame". Weiland cited Bowie as one of his main influences.

This is Weiland's final main solo album featuring original material released during his lifetime, as his next and final solo album The Most Wonderful Time of the Year (2011) only featured covers of traditional Christmas songs.

== Musical style and lyrics ==
In an interview with The Pulse of Radio regarding the album, Weiland stated: "It'll definitely be a sonic journey like the first album was, a little bit more focused since I'm not on a narcotic journey like I was on the last one. But, you know, still sort of all over the map, because my influences are so wide and varied." In an interview with MTV News, Weiland stated that the songs on "Happy" in Galoshes were inspired by the death of his brother, Michael (who also played drums on a song on the album), and Weiland's separation from his wife of eight years, Mary Forsberg.

== Development ==
"Happy" in Galoshes was originally reported to be a double album.

On September 17, 2008, Spin.com posted an exclusive stream of "Paralysis", and the track "Missing Cleveland" was posted on Weiland's MySpace site. On October 24, Spin also posted another new song, "Crash". On October 27, rockdirt.com released the video for "Paralysis", which features actress Paz de la Huerta. On November 18, the album became available to preview on Scott Weiland's MySpace page. A series of 4 webisodes directed by Rocco Guarino were released on scottweiland.com to promote the single "Crash".

"Missing Cleveland" was the first single released from the album on November 11. On February 17, it was announced that fans could vote for the album's second single. The candidates for the voting are "Paralysis", "Blind Confusion", and "Killing Me Sweetly".

== Reception ==
Professional ratings
Review scores
Source	Rating
AllMusic	4/5 stars
Blender	2.5/5 stars
Entertainment Weekly	C−
Rolling Stone	3.5/5 stars
The Skinny	3/5 stars

"Happy" in Galoshes debuted at number 97 on the Billboard 200, selling 10,500 copies in its first week. The album received a 3.5/5 score from Rolling Stone magazine and a four out of five from AllMusic. Entertainment Weekly was not as approving, giving it a C− score.

== Track listing ==
=== Standard edition ===
No.	Title	Writer(s)	Length
1.	"Missing Cleveland"	Doug Grean, Scott Weiland	4:13
2.	"Tangle with Your Mind"	Garry Gary Beers, Weiland	3:42
3.	"Blind Confusion"	Grean, Weiland	4:22
4.	"Paralysis"	Grean, Weiland, Tom Dumont, Tony Kanal, Adrian Young	3:50
5.	"She Sold Her System"	Grean, Weiland	4:31
6.	"Fame" (David Bowie cover feat. Paul Oakenfold)	Carlos Alomar, David Bowie, John Lennon	3:26
7.	"Killing Me Sweetly"	Grean, Weiland	4:33
8.	"Big Black Monster"	Grean, Weiland	3:23
9.	"Crash"	Grean, Weiland	3:47
10.	"Beautiful Day"	Grean, Weiland	5:09
11.	"Pictures & Computers (I'm Not Superman)"	Grean, Weiland	6:49
12.	"Arch Angel"	Grean, Weiland	4:38
13.	"Be Not Afraid" (Catholic hymn untitled track)	Bob Dufford	6:20

=== Deluxe edition ===
==== Disc one ====
No.	Title	Length
1.	"Missing Cleveland"	4:13
2.	"Tangle with Your Mind"	3:42
3.	"Blind Confusion"	4:22
4.	"Paralysis"	3:50
5.	"She Sold Her System"	4:31
6.	"Blister on My Soul"	4:08
7.	"Fame" (David Bowie cover feat. Paul Oakenfold)	3:26
8.	"Killing Me Sweetly"	4:33
9.	"Big Black Monster"	3:23
10.	"Beautiful Day"	5:09

==== Disc two ====
No.	Title	Length
1.	"Crash"	3:51
2.	"Hyper-Fuzz-Funny-Car"	3.29
3.	"The Man I Didn't Know"	4:33
4.	"Sometimes Chicken Soup"	3:59
5.	"Somethings Must Go This Way" (Paloalto cover)	4:45
6.	"Pictures & Computers (I'm Not Superman)"	6:49
7.	"Sentimental Halos"	5:35
8.	"Reel Around the Fountain" (The Smiths cover)	5:25
9.	"Arch Angel"	4:38
10.	"Be Not Afraid" (Catholic hymn untitled track)	6:20
11.	"I Know It's Too Late" (iTunes-only track)	4:26

== Personnel ==
- Scott Weiland – lead vocals, keyboards, piano
- Doug Grean – guitar, bass
- Adrian Young – drums, percussion
- Michael Weiland – drums
- Matt O'Connor – drums, percussion
- Joseph Peck a.k.a. Panhead – steelpans, drums, percussion
- Ross Halfin – cover photography
