= Bug (2006 film) =

2006 psychological horror film

- Theatrical release poster
- Directed by: William Friedkin
- Written by: Tracy Letts
- Based on: Bug by Tracy Letts
- Produced by: Kimberly C. Anderson; Michael Burns; Gary Huckabay; Malcolm Petal; Andreas Schardt; Holly Wiersma
- Starring: Ashley Judd; Michael Shannon; Lynn Collins; Brían F. O'Byrne; Harry Connick Jr.
- Cinematography: Michael Grady
- Edited by: Darrin Navarro
- Music by: Brian Tyler
- Production companies: DMK Mediafonds International; Inferno Distribution LLC; L.I.F.T. Productions
- Distributed by: Lionsgate
- Release dates: May 19, 2006 (Cannes); May 25, 2007 (United States)
- Running time: 102 minutes
- Countries: United States; Germany
- Language: English
- Budget: $4 million
- Box office: $8.2 million

Bug is a 2006 psychological horror film directed by William Friedkin and written by Tracy Letts, and starring Ashley Judd, Michael Shannon, Lynn Collins, Brían F. O'Byrne, and Harry Connick Jr. Letts adapted the screenplay from his 1996 play of the same name. It follows an isolated woman living in a rural Oklahoma motel who spirals into psychosis after taking in a mysterious Gulf War veteran.

Bug debuted at the 2006 Cannes Film Festival before being purchased by Lionsgate, which released the film the following year in May 2007. The film received generally positive reviews from critics, who praised its intensity, directing, acting, and take on paranoia, but were polarized about its writing, in particular the film's ending. Friedkin and Letts collaborated again as director and writer on the 2011 film Killer Joe.

== Plot ==
Waitress Agnes White works at a lesbian bar while living in a run-down motel in rural Oklahoma. Unable to move on after the disappearance of her young son Lloyd nearly ten years before, Agnes binges on drugs and alcohol with her lesbian friend R.C.

Agnes is plagued by silent telephone calls that she believes are being made by her abusive ex-husband Jerry Goss, who has recently been paroled. Jerry had attempted to murder her, and stalked her prior to his arrest. One night, R.C. introduces Agnes to drifter Peter Evans. Agnes strikes up a bond with Peter and allows him to stay the night. The pair's sleep is interrupted by a malfunctioning smoke alarm, which Peter destroys with a Magic 8 Ball handed to him by Agnes.

The next morning, Jerry barges into Agnes's room while Peter is out getting food. After menacing her, Jerry attempts to reconcile. Agnes then insults him, and Jerry punches her. Jerry leaves, promising to return. Peter later comforts Agnes, and the two have sex that night.

Peter wakes Agnes up in the middle of the night, having apparently found an aphid in the bed. A paranoid Peter kills many aphids, and reveals that he is being pursued. However, he refuses to reveal who is hunting him on the grounds that it will put Agnes in danger and flees. Agnes, feeling abandoned, bursts into tears and a remorseful Peter returns. Peter reveals himself to be a veteran of the Gulf War. He claims that he was subjected to biological testing by the U.S. government, that the anonymous calls were made by government agents in anticipation of his arrival, and that the room has become infested by bugs planted by the government as part of the experiments. Peter's movements and behavior become more erratic as he fights the "invisible" bugs he claims are infesting his body.

Over time, Agnes begins to share in his behavior. R.C., who has taken Agnes to visit a dermatologist, is convinced that there are no bugs in the motel. Agnes has also reported to the motel owner that their room has bugs but says that he told her that none of the other rooms have a bug problem. R.C. tries to convince Agnes to leave Peter, mentioning that someone named Dr. Sweet is looking for him. But, after Peter has an episode, Agnes slaps R.C. and tells her to leave. Peter and Agnes isolate themselves, closing the room, covering it with flypaper and aluminum foil to fend off communications, and lighting it with the glow from bug zappers. Peter, believing that microscopic bug egg-sacs were implanted in one of his teeth, tears the tooth out with pliers. After examining the tooth using a child's microscope, he believes that he sees the bugs, as does Agnes. Peter is progressively more obsessed with using the microscope, believing that the bugs are living in and eating his blood.

Jerry eventually bursts in with Dr. Sweet. Sweet sends Jerry outside and tells Agnes that Peter escaped from a mental institution where he was undergoing treatment and that delusions about insects are a known symptom of Peter's mental illness. Agnes distrusts Sweet, who later claims to know where Lloyd is and that the bugs are in fact real. Sweet attempts to convince her that he can help Agnes and Peter escape from the conspiracy.

Peter appears from the bedroom wielding a knife. He argues with Sweet, who readies a syringe, preparing to sedate Peter, but Peter stabs Sweet to death. Distraught, Agnes believes that Peter has destroyed her chance of learning more about her son, but Peter insists that Sweet was not even human, merely a 'robot' sent by the government. Together, Peter and Agnes elaborate upon Peter's beliefs in an escalating conspiracy, becoming convinced that Agnes's son was kidnapped by the government to lead her and Peter to meet. They believe that each was separately infected with bugs meant to mate with each another and take over the world. To prevent this, Agnes and Peter decide to douse each other in gasoline. Jerry, furious over Agnes's unstable behavior, tries to break into the room but she injures him with a staple gun. Agnes and Peter declare their love for each other before setting themselves ablaze.

Toys in Agnes's room are later shown completely intact, with no sign of the aluminum foil. The body of Sweet is then shown lying prone in the foil-covered room which is undamaged by fire. It is left unclear which shot, if any, is "real".

== Cast ==
- Ashley Judd as Agnes White
- Michael Shannon as Peter Evans
- Lynn Collins as R.C.
- Brían F. O'Byrne as Dr. Sweet
- Harry Connick Jr. as Jerry Goss

== Themes ==
=== Substance abuse and mental illness ===
Bug primarily deals with interconnected themes of paranoia, substance abuse, psychosis, and conspiracy theories, with a particular focus on delusional parasitosis. Some critics and writers have noted that the film depicts the psychological effects of chronic methamphetamine use, though the characters in the film are not seen explicitly using the substance. Writing for MovieWeb, Neville Naidoo notes: "By using narcotics to skew the main character's perspectives, the film cleverly masks elements of reality with gut-wrenching paranoia that make for an uncomfortable thrill ride. It uniquely captures what hardcore meth addicts likely suffer through as a consequence of years of frequent usage of the drug. In this way, the film also doubles as a frightening allegory for addiction and the hell that addicts put themselves and others through."

Benjamin Radford, a psychologist at the Center for Inquiry, wrote of the film's depiction of delusional parasitosis in 2013, noting that it "masterfully evokes paranoia, delusions, and claustrophobia. Not only is Bug a very good horror film, but it also provides a fairly realistic (though of course fictionalized) layperson’s look at these disorders."

=== Genre ===
Friedkin has said that the film would have been flagged, in the 1960s or 1970s, as a horror film, but insisted it is no such thing. He told ComingSoon.net that "There were all sorts of people who looked at Bug, (including magazine people like Fangoria) and they called it a horror film," he said. The horror connection "came from a lot of sources." Friedkin claims that Bug is "in many ways, a black comedy love story. He stated in an interview, that "It's not a genre film, but marketing works in mysterious ways. They have to find a genre for it. 'This is a comedy. This is a melodrama. This is a love story. This is a horror film. This is an adventure film.' Bug doesn't fit easily into any of those categories."

== Production ==
=== Casting ===
Michael Shannon had previously played the role of Peter Evans in a 2004 Off-Broadway production of Letts's stage play.

=== Filming ===
Exteriors of the motel were filmed near Olancha, California, and at Grace King High School in Metairie, Louisiana, while studio interiors of the motel room were filmed on a soundstage (a high school gymnasium) in Metairie. A grocery store scene was shot at Migliore's Grocery, and the lesbian bar scene was shot at Boomerang's Bar, both located in New Sarpy, Louisiana. Filming took place over 21 days.

The set design was done by Franco-Giacomo Carbone, the production designer of films such as Hostel (2005) and Rocky Balboa (2006).

Most of the film's action occurs in a seedy motel room. The scenario has three interconnected rooms — a bathroom, a kitchenette and a living room. At one point in the film, the room has several dozen fly strips hanging from the ceiling. At another point the entire room is covered from floor to ceiling in tinfoil. Friedkin has said the tinfoil was a nightmare to work with, because it had to be repaired constantly, and because it reflected everybody who was there, including the crew.

== Music ==
The film score was composed by Brian Tyler, with additional music by Serj Tankian. The end title song "Disappearing Act" was written and performed by Chris Cornell. Jay Faires was the film's music supervisor.

=== Soundtrack ===
The film's theme song is performed by Serj Tankian, the lead singer of the rock band System of a Down. "Beautiful Day" is performed by Scott Weiland, the lead singer of the rock band Stone Temple Pilots.

Additional artists are Sean and Sara Watkins (of Nickel Creek), Chainsaw Kittens, The Backsliders, Susan Tedeschi, Jerry Leiber, The Coasters, Alvin Robinson, Los Tigres del Norte, Leon Russell, and Brian Tyler.

The soundtrack was released in stores on May 22, 2007.

== Release ==
Distributed by Lionsgate, the film premiered in May 2006 in France in the Directors' Fortnight section at the 2006 Cannes Film Festival.

The film received its U.S. premiere at Fantastic Fest on September 25, 2006, in Austin, Texas. It opened in the U.S. at 1,661 theaters on May 25, 2007.

It was released to theaters in France on February 21, 2007. It drew praise from most critics in France, but did not reach the top in the box office. In its opening week in France, it ranked as number twenty of the most-visited films of the week, and earned $216,244 from sixty-six screens.

=== Home media ===
Bug was released on DVD on September 20, 2007. The DVD release included an audio commentary track by William Friedkin and making-of featurettes.

Bug was also made available on HD DVD as a German exclusive, and was subsequently released on Blu-ray in Germany as well.

On November 6, 2022, Kino Lorber, under license from Lionsgate, announced plans for an Ultra HD Blu-ray release of Bug, based on a new 4K remaster, but the planned release was ultimately shelved until after Friedkin's death in 2023. The film was finally released by Kino on November 26, 2024 in both 4K and standard Blu-ray editions, making its North American debut on both formats.

== Reception ==
=== Box office ===
During its opening weekend in the United States, it earned $3.24 million, and ranked as number four at the U.S. box office; it was one of the most-seen films of the weekend, placed behind the popular franchise films Pirates of the Caribbean 3, Shrek 3 and Spider-Man 3.

=== Critical response ===
On the review aggregator website Rotten Tomatoes, 62% of 131 critics' reviews are positive, with an average rating of 6.6/10. The website's consensus reads: "Disappointing resolution aside, Bug uses its claustrophobic setting and cinéma vérité camerawork to tense, impressive effect." Metacritic, which uses a weighted average, assigned the film a score of 62 out of 100, based on 29 critics, indicating "generally favorable" reviews. Audiences surveyed by CinemaScore gave the film a rare average grade of "F" on an A+ to F scale.

At Cannes, Chicago Sun-Times critic Roger Ebert remarked, "The film has caused a stir at Cannes, not least because its stars, Ashley Judd and Michael Shannon, achieve a kind of manic intensity that's frightening not just in itself but because you fear for the actors." A year later, he awarded the film 3 1/2 stars out of 4, describing it in his review as "lean, direct, unrelenting" and calling it "a return to form after some disappointments like Jade." He also acknowledged others' criticism of its single-location setting, which he defended by writing, "There is nothing here to 'open up' and every reason to create a claustrophobic feel. Paranoia shuts down into a desperate focus. It doesn't spread its wings and fly."

Judd was praised for her performance by critic Dennis Dermody from Paper, who wrote: "Ashley Judd gives a raw, shattering Oscar-worthy performance." Stephen Schaeffer from the Boston Herald called it "one of the most disturbing horror movies imaginable". The film received generally positive reviews from the UK media, with Peter Bradshaw awarding it three out of five stars in The Guardian, and Jason Solomons calling the film "a minor masterpiece of tension and insanity", with Judd's "finest performance in years". It was also critic Mark Kermode's film of the week on BBC Radio 5 Live.

=== Awards ===
The film received an award at the 2006 Cannes Film Festival from the International Federation of Film Critics in the Director's Fortnight section.

Judd was nominated for a Saturn Award for Best Actress.

== See also ==
- Delusional parasitosis
- Folie à deux
- Gulf War syndrome
- Morgellons disease
- Paranoia

== Sources ==
- Lennard, Benjamin (2019). Brute Force: Animal Horror Movies. Albany, New York: SUNY Press. ISBN 978-1-438-47662-9.
