= 12 Bar Blues (album) =

Studio album by Scott Weiland
- Released: March 31, 1998
- Recorded: Scott's house, Foxy Dead Girl, Royaltone, Oceanway, The Village, and Master Control
- Genres: Alternative rock; neo-psychedelia
- Length: 58:51
- Label: Atlantic

Scott Weiland chronology
12 Bar Blues (1998)	"Happy" in Galoshes (2008)

12 Bar Blues is the debut solo album from Scott Weiland and was produced by Blair Lamb. Weiland was a founding member and singer for the popular American rock band Stone Temple Pilots; 12 Bar Blues' experimental sound and style differs greatly from STP's previous releases. The design concept of the cover is a homage to the cover design of John Coltrane's Blue Train album.

A 25th anniversary vinyl limited pressing (7,500) was offered by Rhino Records for a special Record Store Day release on April 22, 2023.

== Development ==
In a 1998 interview on MTV's 120 Minutes, Weiland states that his then brother-in-law introduced him to Blair Lamb, who recorded and produced 12 Bar Blues with Weiland acting as co-producer.

== Reception ==
Professional ratings
Review scores
Source	Rating
AllMusic	4/5 stars
Robert Christgau	(dud)
Entertainment Weekly	B
Pitchfork	7.8/10
Rolling Stone	3.5/5 stars
Spin	7/10

Released in 1998 on Atlantic Records, the album was not a commercial success, selling only 90,000 copies in the United States by June 1998.

The album received positive reviews. In a retrospective review, Stephen Thomas Erlewine of AllMusic declared that "12 Bar Blues is an unpredictable, carnivalesque record confirming that Weiland was the visionary behind STP's sound. He's fascinated by sound, piling on layers of shredded guitars, drum loops, and keyboards, making sure that each song sounds drastically different from its predecessor." David Fricke of Rolling Stone awarded the album 3.5 out of 5 stars and declared that "12 Bar Blues isn't really a rock album, or even a pop album. Weiland, out on his own, has simply made an honest album – honest in its confusion, ambition and indulgence. It was worth the risk." but also remarked that "Maybe it's a little early for Scott Weiland to be going the solo way." Pitchfork Media stated upon its release that "12 Bar Blues is easily the most innovative album Weiland has ever produced for public consumption," while Entertainment Weekly wrote that "the LP's sheer invention and hooks will make your indulgence worthwhile."

== Track listing ==
All tracks are written by Scott Weiland, except where noted.

No.	Title	Writer(s)	Length
1.	"Desperation #5"		4:03
2.	"Barbarella"	Scott Weiland; Tony Castaneda	6:25
3.	"Lazy Divey"		4:54
4.	"About Nothing"	Weiland; Castaneda	4:50
5.	"Where's the Man"		5:12
6.	"Divider"	Weiland; Victor Indrizzo	4:23
7.	"Cool Kiss"		4:57
8.	"The Date"		5:21
9.	"Son"	Weiland; Indrizzo	5:03
10.	"Jimmy Was a Stimulator"		4:01
11.	"Lady, Your Roof Brings Me Down"	Weiland; Indrizzo	5:26
12.	"Mockingbird Girl"	Jeff Nolan; Weiland; Zander Schloss	5:03
13.	"Opposite Octave Reaction"		4:26
Total length:			1:04:04

2023 re-issue bonus tracks
No.	Title	Writer(s)	Length
13.	"Barbarella" (Acoustic Version)	Weiland; Castaneda	6:06
14.	"Lazy Divey"		4:54
15.	"Chateau Mars"		2:11
16.	"Barbarella" (Demo)	Weiland; Castaneda	7:37
17.	"Desperation #5" (Demo)		4:52

=== Track information ===
- "Mockingbird Girl" was a re-recording of a song Weiland had originally recorded with The Magnificent Bastards for the 1995 Tank Girl soundtrack three years prior. "Lazy Divey," its name and chorus based on "Mairzy Doats," is only on the promo release and rerelease of the album.
- The 2023 remastered version of "Where's the Man" appears in the film Beetlejuice Beetlejuice.

== Personnel ==
- Scott Weiland – vocals, guitar, keyboards, piano, synthesized bass
- Victor Indrizzo – vocals, guitar, piano, keyboards, bass, drums
- Martyn LeNoble – bass, cello
- Blair Lamb – drum programming, guitars
- Sheryl Crow – accordion
- Brad Mehldau – piano
- Peter DiStefano – guitars, bass
- Daniel Lanois – synthesizers, production
- Tony Castaneda – guitars, bass
- Michael Weiland – drums, percussion, drum loops.
- Tracy Chisolm – theremin
- Holly Reiger – guitars
- Jeff Nolan, Zander Schloss – guitars

=== Production ===
- Produced by Blair Lamb and Scott Weiland.
- Recorded by Blair Lamb and Tracy Chisholm.
- Mixed by Tracy Chisholm.
- Additional Recording by: Chad Banford and Chris Goss.
- Additional engineers: David Nottingham, Eric Greedy, Jeff Robinson, John Sorensen, Rafa Sardina, Reid Miller
- Additional Mixing by Mark Howard and Daniel Lanois.
- Mastering: Daniel Lanois, Tracy Chisholm and Mark Chalecki.

== Chart performance ==
Sales chart performance for 12 Bar Blues
Chart	Peak
US Billboard 200	42
New Zealand Albums (RMNZ)	47

Additionally, "Barbarella" peaked at 194 on the UK Singles Chart

Chart (2023)	Peak position
Hungarian Albums (MAHASZ)	26
