= Blaster (Scott Weiland album) =

Studio album by Scott Weiland and the Wildabouts
- Released: March 31, 2015
- Recorded: 2014
- Genre: Rock
- Length: 45:47
- Label: Softdrive
- Producer: Rick Parker

Scott Weiland chronology
| The Most Wonderful Time of the Year (2011) | Blaster (2015) |

Singles from Blaster
- 1. "White Lightning" Released: January 12, 2015; 2. "Way She Moves" Released: February 10, 2015; 3. "20th Century Boy" Released: February 24, 2015

Blaster is the only studio album by American rock band Scott Weiland and the Wildabouts. The album was released on March 31, 2015, by Softdrive Records.

== Background ==
In an interview with Rolling Stone ahead of the album's release, Scott Weiland compared the excitement he felt during the making of Blaster with his emotions during the early days of Stone Temple Pilots:

"If you take out the fact that we had to break up the recording process when touring, the album came very easily because of the vibe between the band members. The sound we were getting felt original and infectious and brought me back to the feelings I had when I made my first couple records. Just excitement, feeling invigorated. Youthful."

Guitarist Jeremy Brown died one day prior to the album's release on March 30, 2015. During the tour to support the album, Weiland was found dead on the band's tour bus on December 3, 2015.

== Reception ==
Professional ratings
Aggregate scores
| Source | Rating |
|---|---|
| Metacritic | 57/100 |
Review scores
| Source | Rating |
| AllMusic | 3/5 stars |
| Consequence | C− |
| Rolling Stone | 2/5 stars |

Blaster received mixed reviews from critics. At Metacritic, which assigns a normalized rating out of 100 to reviews from critics, the album received an average score of 57, which indicates "mixed or average reviews", based on 7 reviews. Dan Bogosian of Consequence said, "Scott Weiland spent so much time as a one-trick pony. Even in his softest work with Stone Temple Pilots and Velvet Revolver, his tunes could be best described as “guitar-heavy” and “furry.” Blaster is no different, though he has gone more glam than before. By the standards of the Weiland of old, Blaster falls softly short; its best flavors come from the handful of new touches." Stephen Thomas Erlewine of AllMusic said, "With such a familiar palette, details matter and the aptly titled Blaster lacks in subtlety. Much of it churns at crackling digital overdrive, sounding brutal, loud, and ugly, but beneath that gnarled surface, Weiland can still deliver the kind of candied hooks that keep him firmly situated as a guilty pleasure. Usually, these hooks grab hold on the lightest songs: the snaky sway of "Way She Moves," the icy new romanticism of "Youth Quake," and, especially, "Beach Pop," a piece of sticky AM bubblegum pop that earns its handclaps." Kory Grow of Rolling Stone said, "With Stone Temple Pilots, Scott Weiland was one of grunge's greatest singers, crooning and growling in equal measure. His husky howls were also one of the super-ingredients in Velvet Revolver. But on most of Blaster, Weiland's first all-new solo album since 2008, he suffers from a bad case of Generic Rock Voice, firing off gravelly clichés like, "In the nick of time/I was taken by surprise by this girl of mine" ("Amethyst")."

== Track listing ==
| No. | Title | Writer(s) | Length |
|---|---|---|---|
| 1. | "Modzilla" | Scott Weiland; Jeremy Brown; Tommy Black | 3:17 |
| 2. | "Way She Moves" | Weiland; Brown; Black; Danny Thompson | 4:11 |
| 3. | "Hotel Rio" | Weiland; Brown; Black; Thompson | 4:36 |
| 4. | "Amethyst" | Weiland; Brown; Mike Avenaim; Black | 4:17 |
| 5. | "White Lightning" | Weiland; Brown; Black; Thompson | 3:22 |
| 6. | "Blue Eyes" | Weiland; James Iha; Brown; Black | 3:57 |
| 7. | "Bleed Out" | Weiland; Brown; Black; Thompson | 2:45 |
| 8. | "Youth Quake" | Weiland; Brown; Black | 3:46 |
| 9. | "Beach Pop" | Weiland; Brown; Black; Thompson | 3:30 |
| 10. | "Parachute" | Weiland; Brown; Black; Thompson | 4:29 |
| 11. | "20th Century Boy" (T. Rex cover) | Marc Bolan | 4:20 |
| 12. | "Circles" | Weiland; Brown; Black; Thompson | 3:16 |

== Personnel ==
- Scott Weiland – lead vocals, rhythm guitar, keyboards
- Jeremy Brown – lead guitar
- Tommy Black – bass, backing vocals
- Danny Thompson – drums
- Mike Avenaim – drums (tracks 1, 4, 6, 8)
- James Iha – rhythm guitar (track 6)

== Charts ==
| Chart (2015) | Peak position |
|---|---|
| US Billboard 200 | 133 |
| US Independent Albums (Billboard) | 10 |
| US Top Rock Albums (Billboard) | 24 |
