= Lady, Your Roof Brings Me Down =

Single by Scott Weiland

from the album Great Expectations Soundtrack
- Released: 1997
- Genre: Alternative rock
- Length: 5:26
- Label: Atlantic
- Songwriter(s): Scott Weiland; Victor Indrizzo
- Producer(s): Blair Lamb; Scott Weiland

Scott Weiland singles chronology
"Lady, Your Roof Brings Me Down" (1997)	"Barbarella" (1998)

Audio video
- "Lady Your Roof Brings Me Down (2023 Remaster)" on YouTube

"Lady, Your Roof Brings Me Down" is a song by Scott Weiland first appearing on the Great Expectations Soundtrack and then later on his debut album 12 Bar Blues. The song features Sheryl Crow on accordion.

== Personnel ==
- Sheryl Crow - Accordion
- Joel Derouin - Violin
- Victor Indrizzo - Piano, Guitar, Drums, Additional Vocals
- Susie Katayama - Cello
- Blair Lamb - Producer
- Martyn LeNoble - Bass
- Robin Lorentz - Violin
- Novi Novog - Viola
- Scott Weiland - Vocals, Synthesizer

== Charts ==
Chart	Peak
Modern Rock Tracks	39
