= The Actual (band) =

American alternative rock band

- Origin: US
- Genres: Alternative rock
- Years active: 2001–2007
- Labels: Softdrive Records; RED Distribution
- Members: Max Bernstein; Rob Obee; Jeremy Bonsall; Ben Flanagan

The Actual were a four-piece alternative rock group from Los Angeles, California headed by guitarist and singer Max Bernstein. They were signed to Eyeball Records and released one album as a three-piece for the label, "Songs On Radio Idaho", before signing with Scott Weiland's label Softdrive Records. They opened for the supergroup Velvet Revolver at the Aladdin Hotel in the summer of 2005 and also played the Volcom stage on the 2007 Warped Tour. In 2005, The Actual contributed two songs "Promised Land" and "Dancing On The Perimeter" to the film "Bewitched" (2005).

The Actual's second album In Stitches was released on May 31, 2007, on the Softdrive label. They promoted the album by touring as the opening act for Velvet Revolver on their Spring 2007 club tour. Weiland is the co-producer of In Stitches. The album's first single, "This is the Worst Day of My Life," was selected as song-of-the-week on MySpace in late May 2007. In late 2007, The Actual parted ways.

The Actual played their first live show in 13 years on October 1, 2023 in Los Angeles, with Bernstein on guitar and vocals, Jeremy Bonsall on bass and Aaron Bonsall on drums.

== Line-up ==
- Max Bernstein- vocals, guitar
- Rob Obee- drums and Jeffrey Keenan- drums
- Jeremy Bonsall- bass
- Ben Flanagan- guitar, vocals

== Discography details ==
=== The Red EP (2001, Eyeball Records) ===
1. Shells
2. Cold Inside
3. Big Trouble in Little China
4. I Don't Want to Know
5. Manhattan

=== Songs on Radio Idaho (2003, Eyeball Records) ===
Songs on Radio Idaho cover art

Songs on Radio Idaho is the band's first album. It was released on September 2, 2003, by Eyeball.

Songs on Radio Idaho track listing

1. The Proof
2. The Glow Wears Off
3. Cold Inside
4. Hospitality Girl
5. Keep You in a Bottle
6. A Way Around It
7. I Am an Item
8. So Long
9. Cameron
10. Across the Country
11. When the Dishes Decide to Break
12. The Shines
13. Radio Idaho

=== In Stitches (2007, Softdrive) ===
1. The Pride Of The Echelon
2. This Is The Worst Day Of My Life (Do You Want To Come Over)
3. September Had A Trigger Finger
4. If You See Her
5. Permanent Kitten
6. Needle Park
7. To All The Plain Janes
8. Between The Bridge And The Chapel
9. Dancing On The Perimeter
10. Sending You A Signal
11. Lindsay Never Gets Lonely
12. Stay In My Rectangle
13. Hospitality Girl
