= Barbarella (song) =

Single by Scott Weiland

from the album 12 Bar Blues
- Released: 1998
- Recorded: Scott's house, Foxy Dead Girl, Royaltone, Oceanway, The Village, and Master Control
- Genre: Alternative rock
- Length: 6:39
- Label: Atlantic
- Songwriter(s): Scott Weiland; Tony Castaneda
- Producer(s): Tracy Chisholm; Scott Weiland

Scott Weiland singles chronology
"Lady, Your Roof Brings Me Down" (1997)	"Barbarella" (1998)	"Learning to Drive" (2007)

"Barbarella" is the only official single released from Scott Weiland's 1998 debut album 12 Bar Blues. The song is titled after the sci-fi film Barbarella, while the lyrics of the song pay homage to several science fiction television shows and movies.

== Music video ==
The song's music video, directed by Jonathan Dayton and Valerie Faris, uses themes from the David Bowie film The Man Who Fell to Earth. It was shot in and around Las Vegas, Nevada.

== Chart performance ==
The song charted on the Billboard Modern Rock Tracks and remained there for three weeks, peaking at number 36.

Chart (1998)	Peak position
US Modern Rock Tracks (Billboard)	36

== Personnel ==
- Tony Castaneda - Guitar
- Tracy Chisholm - Producer
- Peter DiStefano - Guitar, Ethereal Guitar, Bass
- Mark Howard - Mixing
- Victor Indrizzo - Hi-hat Cymbal
- Daniel Lanois - Guitar, Producer, Mixing
- Martyn LeNoble - Bass
- Holly Reiger - Guitar
- Michael Weiland - Acoustic Drum Loop
- Scott Weiland - Vocals, Human Beatbox, Piano, Synthesizer, Percussion, Additional Guitars, Producer
