= Franco-Giacomo Carbone =

American production designer

Franco-Giacomo Carbone is an American production designer.

He began as a set and costume designer in New York. He has worked off Broadway for Lincoln Center Theater, La Mama and others. He graduated from the American Film Institute in 1998. Carbone's very first film, Billy's Hollywood Screen Kiss, garnered favorable reviews nationwide for its bold production design. His motion picture credits include Sylvester Stallone's Rocky Balboa and John Rambo, William Friedkin's Bug, Eli Roth's Hostel and Cabin Fever, David Jacobson's Down in the Valley and James Cox's Wonderland.

== Filmography ==
| Year | Title | Director | Notes |
|---|---|---|---|
| 2008 | The Lodger | David Ondaatje | |
| 2008 | Rambo | Sylvester Stallone | |
| 2007 | Bug | William Friedkin | |
| 2006 | Rocky Balboa | Sylvester Stallone | |
| 2005 | Hostel | Eli Roth | |
| 2005 | Down in the Valley | David Jacobson | |
| 2004 | Starship Troopers 2: Hero of the Federation | Phil Tippett | Video |
| 2004 | Perfect Opposites | Matt Cooper | |
| 2003 | Wonderland | James Cox | |
| 2002 | Cabin Fever | Eli Roth | |
| 2002 | Purpose | Alan Ari Lazar | |
| 2001 | Pretty When You Cry | Jack N. Green | |
| 2001 | Alex in Wonder | Drew Ann Rosenberg | |
| 2001 | See Jane Run | Sarah Thorp | |
| 2001 | Almost a Woman | Betty Kaplan | TV |
| 2000 | Psycho Beach Party | Robert Lee King | |
| 1999 | Shafted! | Tom Putnam | |
| 1999 | Deal of a Lifetime | Paul Levine | |
| 1999 | Kill the Man | Tom Booker, Jon Kean | |
| 1998 | A Hollow Place | Joseph Anaya | |
| 1998 | Billy's Hollywood Screen Kiss | Tommy O'Haver | |
