= The Backsliders =

The Backsliders, 1999

The Backsliders are an alternative-traditional country-rock band. Chip Robinson teamed up with Steve Howell to form the band as a duo in 1991 in Athens, GA. The remaining members had all joined the group by 1994, and the group imploded in 1999 during the making of the album Southern Lines. Chip Robinson reformed the band to finish the album with Don Dixon and Mitch Easter at The Fidelitorium, recruiting Terry Anderson on drums, Roger Gupton on bass and vocals, Rob Farris on Hammond B3 and piano. Brad Rice rejoined this lineup on lead guitar for the tour promoting that album. The Backsliders disbanded shortly after the tour and reformed with the original members in 2012.

== Band members ==
- Chip Robinson - vocals, guitar
- Stephen Howell - guitar, vocals
- Greg Rice - keyboards
- Danny Kurtz - bass
- Jeff Dennis - drums

== Past members ==
- Brad Rice - guitar
- Terry Anderson - drums, vocals
- Roger Gupton - bass, vocals
- Erik Kristiansen - guitar
- Mike Krause - guitar
- Rob Farris - keyboards, vocals

== Discography ==
- 1996 From Raleigh, North Carolina
- 1997 Throwin' Rocks at the Moon - (produced by Dwight Yoakam’s longtime guitarist, Pete Anderson) - # 1 on the Americana radio chart
- 1999 Southern Lines - (produced by Eric Ambel with additional recording done by Don Dixon and Mitch Easter)
- 2014 Raleighwood (EP) - named after a tour slogan and sign erected over the ruins of The Brewery, a bar where the band got its start.

Other

- 1997 Crash Course - various artists – track # 6 "My Baby's Gone"
- 1998 The Songs Of Dwight Yoakam: Will Sing For Food - various artists – track # 2 "Doin' What I Did"
- 2007 Bug - original motion picture soundtrack - various artists – track # 4 "Cowboy Boots"

== See also ==
- Jeff Hart and the Ruins - Chip Robinson
- Son Volt - Brad Rice
- Tift Merritt - Brad Rice
- Ryan Adams - Brad Rice
