= Softdrive Records =

- Founded: 2003
- Founder: Scott Weiland
- Defunct: 2015
- Distributor: RED Distribution / New West Records
- Genre: Rock, alternative rock
- Country of origin: United States
- Location: Los Angeles, California

Softdrive Records was an American independent record label founded by musician Scott Weiland, best known as the lead singer of Stone Temple Pilots and Velvet Revolver. The label was established in 2003 and was later developed by Weiland with producer Doug Grean and manager Dana Dufine. Its roster included The Actual, Campfire Girls, Something to Burn, Tommy Joe Wilson, The Color Turning and Vox Waves, in addition to releases by Weiland himself.

== History ==
Weiland founded Softdrive Records in 2003 as a joint venture with Interscope Records. The label's first announced release was Tell Them Hi, an album by Los Angeles rock band Campfire Girls.

The label was expanded in 2006 by Weiland, producer Doug Grean and manager Dana Dufine. Softdrive entered into a distribution arrangement with RED Distribution, then part of Sony BMG, with additional support from New West Records.

Los Angeles alternative rock band The Actual became one of Softdrive's early signings. Their album In Stitches was released by the label in 2007 and was co-produced by Weiland and Grean.

Softdrive also signed Something to Burn, whose album Transitions was released through Softdrive and New West Records in 2009.

Weiland also used Softdrive for his solo work, including his second solo studio album, "Happy" in Galoshes, released in 2008.

Producer and engineer Rocco Guarino worked extensively with Weiland and Softdrive-related projects, including engineering work on Happy in Galoshes and Blaster, directing Softdrive promotional material and producing recordings for Vox Waves.

In 2014, Softdrive began working with Los Angeles psychedelic rock band Vox Waves, whose members included singer Evan Snyder, later a touring drummer for Night Beats, and musician Matteo Arias. The band was intended to become a flagship project for a renewed Softdrive Records after Weiland became a supporter of their music.

Guarino produced and engineered material for Vox Waves, including "Wasting All My Time". The group later became known as Turquoise Noise, with Guarino producing, engineering and mixing an album under that name. The planned Softdrive project was not commercially released following Weiland's death in December 2015.

== Artists ==
- Scott Weiland
- Scott Weiland and the Wildabouts
- The Actual
- Campfire Girls
- Something to Burn
- Tommy Joe Wilson
- The Color Turning
- Vox Waves / Turquoise Noise

== Selected releases ==
Year	Artist	Title	Notes
2003	Campfire Girls	Tell Them Hi	
2007	The Actual	In Stitches	
2008	Scott Weiland	"Happy" in Galoshes	
2009	Something to Burn	Transitions	
2011	Scott Weiland	The Most Wonderful Time of the Year	
2014	Scott Weiland and the Wildabouts	Blaster	
2015	Vox Waves / Turquoise Noise	Turquoise Noise	Produced and engineered by Rocco Guarino; planned Softdrive project

== See also ==
- Scott Weiland
- Stone Temple Pilots
- Velvet Revolver
