= Doug Grean =

American record producer, audio engineer, and guitarist

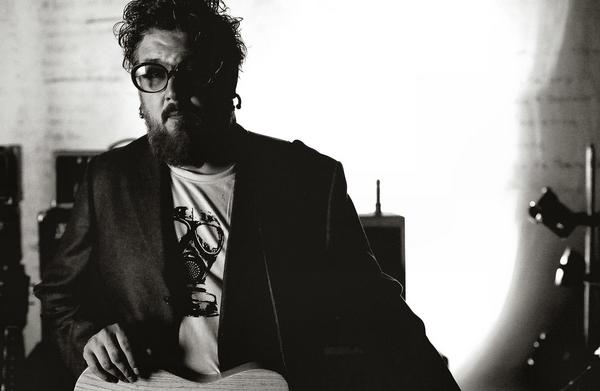

Background information
- Origin: United States
- Occupations: Music Producer; Audio Engineer; Musician
- Instruments: Guitar; Bass; Keyboard

Doug Grean is an American record producer, audio engineer, guitarist, based in NYC. He has worked with artists Sheryl Crow, Ricki Lee Jones, Glen Campbell, Scott Weiland, Slash, Velvet Revolver, Stone Temple Pilots, The Crystal Method, Tim McGraw, Cyndi Lauper, Annabella Lwin (Bow Wow Wow), Corey Glover (Living Colour), Camp Freddy, DJ Hurricane and John Taylor (Duran Duran). Grean was formerly the lead guitarist and touring musical director for Scott Weiland and the Wildabouts. Some of Grean's television appearances with Weiland include: VH1 Legends, Last Call with Carson Daly, The Tonight Show with Jay Leno, and the Grammy awards with Velvet Revolver as keyboardist, performing "All Across the Universe" with Stevie Wonder, Norah Jones, Bono, Steven Tyler, Brian Wilson, and Alison Krauss.

Grean is a multi-instrumentalist; he plays guitar, bass, keyboards, mandolin, lap steel, and banjo. He is most noted for morphing electric guitar sounds, unique and highly stylized. "I’m constantly trying to wring new and exciting voices from the sometimes-mundane electric guitar,” Grean explains. "Some end up sounding very ambient, but others sound like synthesizers, or like string sections." His hallmark rock production sound often incorporates electronic music and horns, as well as traditional Americana instruments such as accordion, hammer dulcimer.

Grean was born April 12, 1966, in Portchester, New York. He discovered guitar and mandolin at age 13 and formed a band with his friends which developed into a popular Grateful Dead-influenced jam band, Crimson Rose, drawing standing-room-only crowds throughout the Tri-State area at clubs where he was too young to enter. At 18, Grean moved to New Orleans to study music at Tulane University. Over the next 10 years, he became a devoted student of New Orleans' style jazz, blues and funk, honing his guitar chops by performing extensively in the city’s most authentic venues. During that time, Grean jammed in nightclubs alongside George Porter Jr. (The Meters), Ivan Neville, Willie Green (The Neville Brothers), and Russell Batiste.

In 1992, Grean moved to Los Angeles, where he engineered at Clubhouse studios (Burbank, California) and Artisan studios (Hollywood, California), and then produced and engineered at Softdrive Records (Scott Weiland's studio in Burbank, California) for 15 years.

Grean currently records and produces from his studio Haven Sound in NYC. He also writes and plays gigs around Los Angeles and Long Beach in his New Orleans funk band, the Terpsichords.

== Discography ==
- Scott Weiland – It's the Most Wonderful Time of the Year (2011) Softdrive/Rhino
- Scott Weiland – A Compilation of SW Covers (2011) Softdrive
- The Other Side OF Morning – Letter's from your Love the Mad Man (2011)
- Stone Temple Pilots – Stone Temple Pilots (2010) Atlantic
- The Color Turning – Good Hands Bad Blood (2009) Softdrive/Sony
- Something To Burn – Transitions (2008) Softdrive/Sony
- Scott Weiland – Happy In Galoshes (2008) Softdrive/Sony
- Craig Gore – Ten Year Sleep (2007) Independent
- The Actual – In Stitches (2007) Softdrive/Sony
- Velvet Revolver – Libertad (2007) RCA
- Scott Weiland – Bug motion picture soundtrack (2007) Lionsgate
- Last of the Believers – Paper ships Under a Burning Bridge (2007) LOTB Inc.
- Camp Freddy – Employee of the Month motion picture soundtrack (2006) Lionsgate
- Kevin Max – Between the Fence and the Universe (2005) Infinity
- The Actual – Bewitched motion picture soundtrack (2005) Sony
- King Straggler – King Straggler (2005) Independent
- Velvet Revolver – Live Bonus DVD (2004) RCA
- Velvet Revolver – Fantastic Four motion picture soundtrack (2004) Windup
- Velvet Revolver – Contraband (2004) RCA
- Sheryl Crow – C'mon C'mon (2002) Interscope
- The Crystal Method – Community Service (2002) Geffen
- The Crystal Method – Tweekend (2001) Geffen
- Scott Weiland – Not Another Teen Movie motion picture soundtrack (2001) Maverick
- Scott Weiland – Austin Powers: The Spy Who Shagged Me motion picture soundtrack (2000) Warner Bros.
- Scott Weiland – Ready To Rumble motion picture soundtrack (2000) Atlantic
- Stone Temple Pilots – Shangri-La Dee Da (2000) Atlantic
- Stone Temple Pilots – The Stoned Immaculate: A Tribute To The Doors (2000) Elektra
