= Scott Weiland =

American singer (1967–2015)

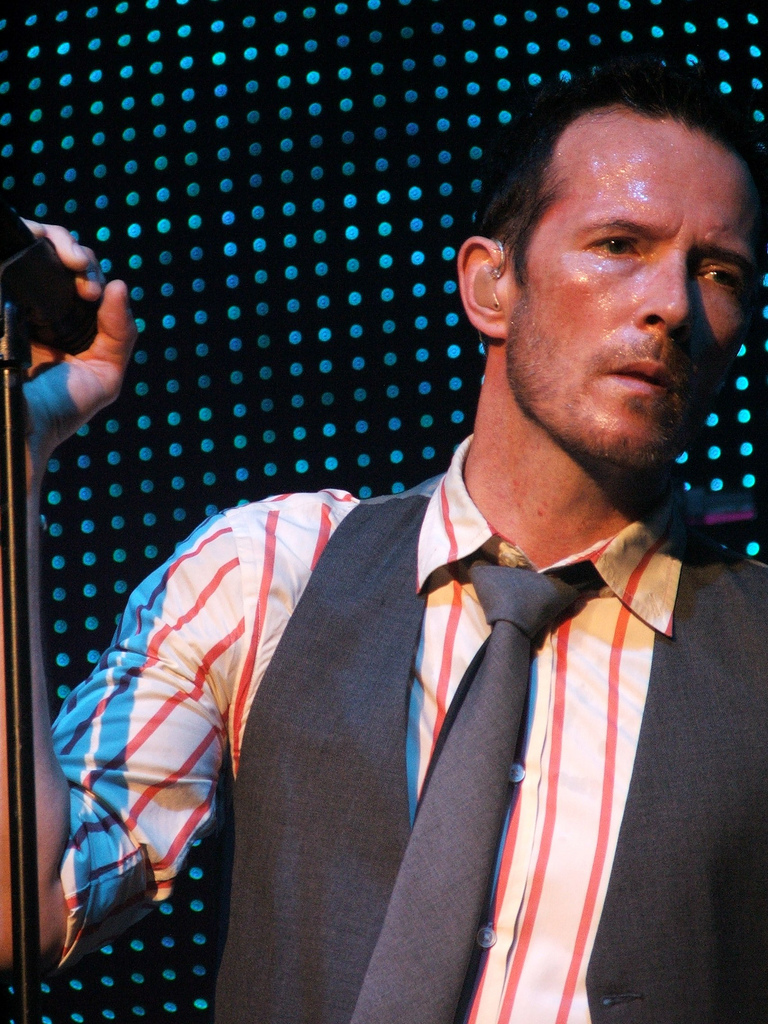
- Weiland performing with Stone Temple Pilots in July 2009

Background information
- Born: Scott Richard Kline; October 27, 1967; San Jose, California, U.S.
- Origin: San Diego, California, U.S.
- Died: December 3, 2015 (aged 48) Bloomington, Minnesota, U.S.
- Genres: Alternative rock; hard rock; alternative metal; grunge; neo-psychedelia
- Occupations: Singer; songwriter
- Years active: 1985–2015
- Labels: Softdrive; Atlantic; RCA
- Formerly of: Stone Temple Pilots; Velvet Revolver; Camp Freddy; The Magnificent Bastards; The Wondergirls; Art of Anarchy; Scott Weiland and the Wildabouts
- Spouses: Janina Castaneda (m. 1994; div. 2000) Mary Forsberg (m. 2000; div. 2007) Jamie Wachtel (m. 2013)
- Website: scottweiland.com

Scott Richard Weiland (/ˈwaɪlənd/, WY-lənd; né Kline; October 27, 1967 – December 3, 2015) was an American singer and songwriter. He was best known as the lead vocalist of the rock band Stone Temple Pilots from 1989 to 2003 and again from 2008 to 2013, recording six albums with them. Weiland was also the lead singer of the rock supergroup Velvet Revolver from 2003 to 2008. He released one album with rock supergroup Art of Anarchy in 2015, as well as four solo studio albums and several collaborations with other musicians.

Weiland was noted for his flamboyant and chaotic onstage persona, his consistently changing appearance, and his versatile vocal style. He sold over 50 million albums with his various projects and collaborations. Weiland's career was plagued by substance abuse issues, leading to various high-profile arrests and his firings from Velvet Revolver and Stone Temple Pilots. On December 3, 2015, at the age of 48, he was found dead on his tour bus from an accidental drug overdose.

== Early life ==
Weiland was born Scott Richard Kline on October 27, 1967, at the Kaiser Permanente Medical Center in San Jose, California, the son of Sharon (née Williams) and Kent Kline. His father had German ancestry. He was raised Catholic. At the age of five, he was legally adopted by his stepfather David Weiland and subsequently took his surname. Around the same time, he moved to Bainbridge Township, Ohio, where he attended Kenston High School. According to Robert DeLeo, when he was younger, Scott was in choir. At the age of 12, while living in Ohio, Weiland was raped by an older male who invited him to his house; he wrote in his autobiography Not Dead & Not For Sale that he repressed the memory until it returned to him in therapy decades later.

Weiland moved back to California as a teenager and attended Edison High School in Huntington Beach and Orange Coast College in Costa Mesa. Before fully devoting himself to a music career, he worked as a paste up artist for the Los Angeles Daily Journal legal newspaper.

== Career ==
=== Stone Temple Pilots ===
In 1985, Scott Weiland and his friends in their band Soi Disant – guitarist Corey Hicock and drummer David Allin – first encountered Robert DeLeo playing live at various gigs, deciding to track him down after witnessing his shows. Hicock and Allin would soon be replaced by Eric Kretz and DeLeo's brother Dean. They took the name Stone Temple Pilots because of their fondness for the initials "STP". Robert DeLeo said that, while he was working at Mesa Boogie, in Sunset Boulevard, Scott was working "across catty-corner" from him and would come to show musical ideas. In one of the band's first opening performances under the name Mighty Joe Young, they opened for Electric Love Hogs, whose guitarist Dave Kushner would one day co-found Weiland's later band Velvet Revolver. In 1992, they released their first album, Core, spawning four hits ("Sex Type Thing", "Wicked Garden", "Creep", and "Plush".)

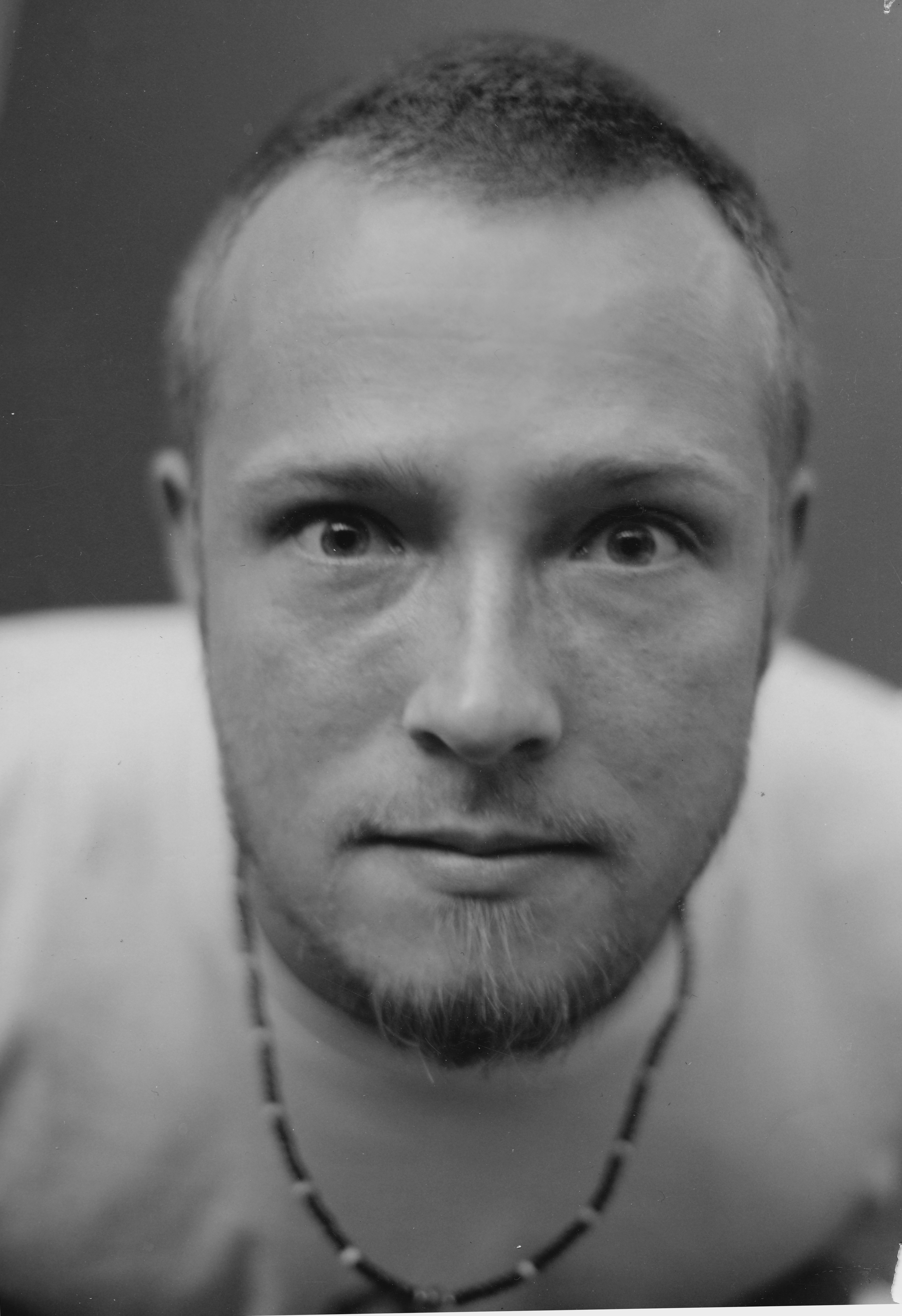
Weiland in 1994

In 1994, STP released their second record, Purple, which saw the development of a more distinctive identity for the band. Like Core, Purple was a big success for the band, spawning three hit singles ("Big Empty", "Vasoline", and "Interstate Love Song") and selling more than six million copies. The critical response to Purple was more favorable, with Spin calling it a "quantum leap" from the band's previous album.

In 1995, Weiland formed the alternative rock band the Magnificent Bastards with session drummer Victor Indrizzo in San Diego. The band included Zander Schloss and Jeff Nolan on guitars and Bob Thompson on bass. Only two songs were recorded by the Magnificent Bastards, "Mockingbird Girl", composed by Nolan, Schloss, and Weiland, appeared in the film Tank Girl and on its soundtrack, and a cover of John Lennon's "How Do You Sleep?" was recorded for the tribute album, Working Class Hero: A Tribute to John Lennon. Weiland rejoined Stone Temple Pilots in the fall of 1995, but STP was forced to cancel most of their 1996–1997 tour in support of their third release, Tiny Music... Songs from the Vatican Gift Shop, which sold about two million albums. Weiland encountered problems with drug addiction at this time as well, which inspired some of his songs in the late-1990s and resulted in jail time.

In 1999, STP regrouped once again and released No. 4. The album contained the hit single "Sour Girl", promoted by a surreal music video with Sarah Michelle Gellar. That same year, Weiland also recorded two songs with the short-lived supergroup the Wondergirls. During this time period, Weiland spent five months in jail for drug possession.

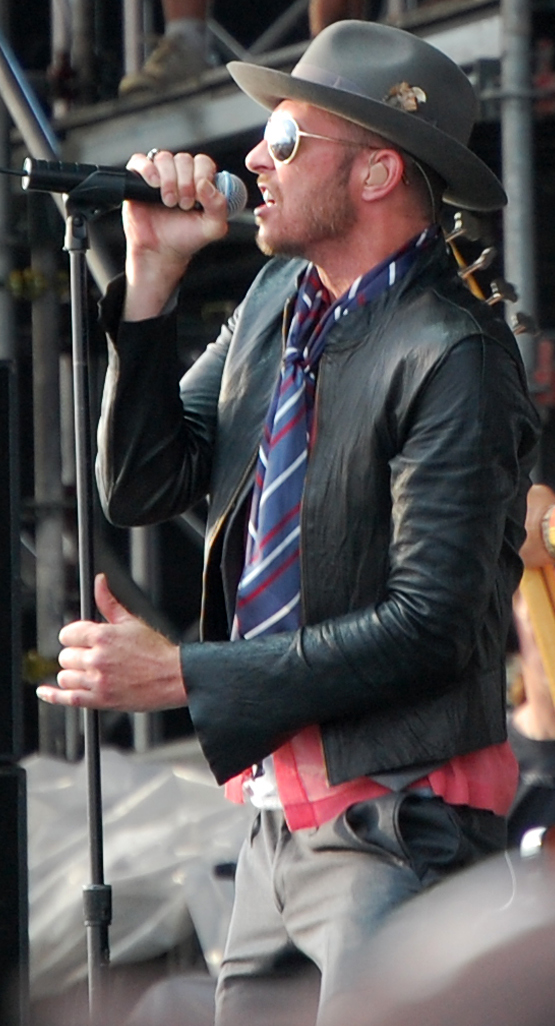
Weiland onstage with Stone Temple Pilots, 2008

In November 2000, Weiland was invited to perform on the show VH1 Storytellers with the surviving members of the Doors. Weiland performed vocals on two Doors songs, "Break On Through (To the Other Side)" and "Five to One". That same month Stone Temple Pilots appeared on the Doors tribute CD, Stoned Immaculate with their own rendition of "Break on Through" as the lead track. On June 19, 2001, STP released its fifth album, Shangri-La Dee Da. That same year the band headlined the Family Values Tour along with Linkin Park, Staind and Static-X. In late 2002, significant backstage altercations between the DeLeo brothers and Weiland precipitated the band's break-up.

In 2008, Stone Temple Pilots announced a 73-date U.S. tour on April 7 and performed together for the first time since 2002. The reunion tour kicked off at the Rock on the Range festival on May 17, 2008. According to Dean DeLeo, steps toward a Stone Temple Pilots reunion started with a simple phone call from Weiland's wife. She invited the DeLeo brothers to play at a private beach party, which led to the reconciliation of Weiland and the DeLeo brothers.

STP's reunion tour was a success, and the band continued to tour throughout 2009 and began recording its sixth studio album. STP's first album since 2001, Stone Temple Pilots, was released on May 25, 2010.

STP toured Southeast Asia for the first time in 2011, playing in Philippines (Manila), Singapore and Indonesia (Jakarta). Following this, the band played successful shows in Australia, including sell-out performances in Sydney and Melbourne.

The band expressed interest in a 20th anniversary tour to celebrate the release of Core with Scott commenting on January 2, 2012, "Well, we're doing a lot of special things. [There's] a lot of archival footage that we're putting together, a coffee table book, hopefully a brand new album – so many ideas. A box set and then a tour, of course."

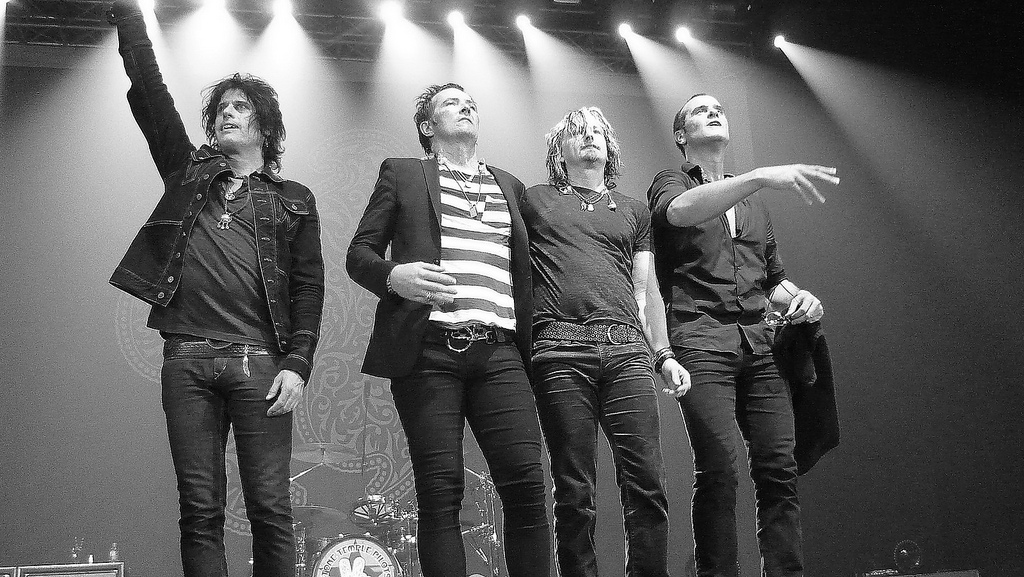
Stone Temple Pilots in 2011

STP began to experience problems in 2012 that were said to have been caused by tensions between Weiland and the rest of the band. Despite the band's claims that their fall tour would be celebrating the 20th anniversary of Core, this did not happen. On February 27, 2013, shortly before his solo tour was set to commence, Stone Temple Pilots announced Weiland's termination from the band on their website.

Weiland criticized the band after they hired Linkin Park singer Chester Bennington as his replacement, claiming he was still a member and they shouldn't be calling themselves Stone Temple Pilots without him.

=== Velvet Revolver ===
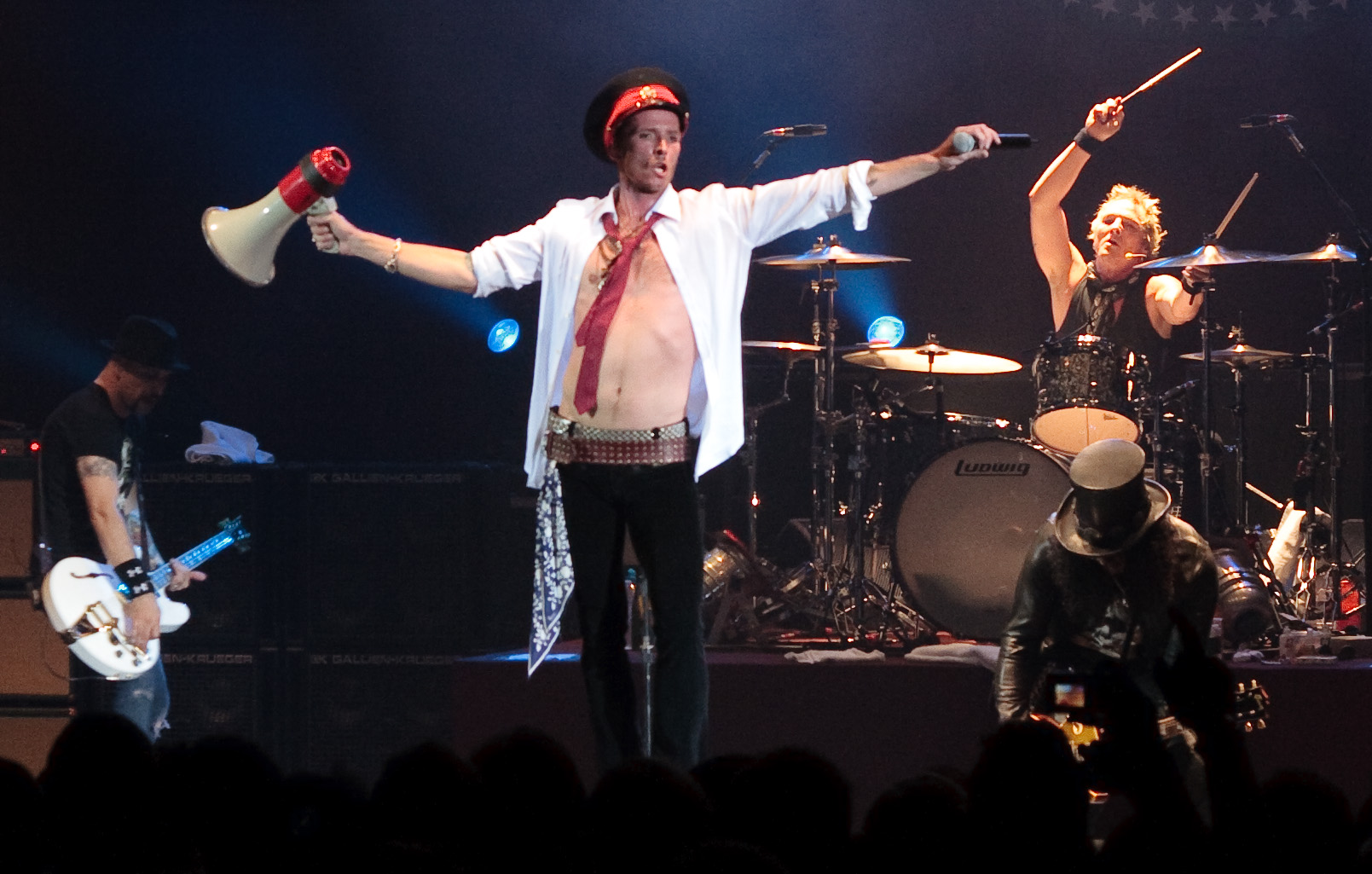
Weiland performing with Velvet Revolver in London

In 2002, former Guns N' Roses members – guitarist Slash, bassist Duff McKagan and drummer Matt Sorum – as well as former Wasted Youth guitarist Dave Kushner were looking for a singer to help form a new band. Throughout his career, Weiland had become acquainted with the four musicians; he became friends with McKagan after attending the same gym, was in rehab at the same time as Sorum and once played on the same bill as Kushner. Weiland was sent two discs of material to work with but felt that the first disc "sounded like Bad Company gone wrong". Weiland was more positive when he was sent the second disc, comparing it to Core-era Stone Temple Pilots, though he turned them down because Stone Temple Pilots had not yet separated.

When Stone Temple Pilots disbanded in 2003, the band sent Weiland new music, which he took into his studio and added vocals. This music eventually became the song "Set Me Free". Although he delivered the music to the band himself, Weiland was still unsure whether or not he wanted to join them, despite performing at an industry showcase at Mates. They recorded two songs with producer Nick Raskulinecz, a recorded version of "Set Me Free" and a cover of Pink Floyd's "Money", for the soundtracks to the movies The Hulk and The Italian Job, respectively. Weiland joined the band soon after, and "Set Me Free" managed to peak at number 17 on the Mainstream Rock chart without any radio promotion or a record label. It was prior to a screening of The Hulk at Universal Studios that the band chose a name. After seeing a movie by Revolution Studios, Slash liked the beginning of the word, eventually thinking of Revolver because of its multiple meanings: the name of a gun, subtext of a revolving door, which suited the band, as well as the name of a Beatles album. When he suggested Revolver to the band, Weiland suggested 'Black Velvet' Revolver, liking the idea of "something intimate like velvet juxtaposed with something deadly like a gun." They eventually arrived at Velvet Revolver, announcing it at a press conference and performance showcase at the El Rey Theatre while also performing the songs "Set Me Free" and "Slither" as well as covers of Nirvana's "Negative Creep", Sex Pistols' "Bodies", and Guns N' Roses' "It's So Easy".

Velvet Revolver's debut album Contraband was released in June 2004 to much success. It debuted at number one on the Billboard 200 and has sold over three million copies worldwide to date. Two of the album's songs, "Slither" and "Fall to Pieces", reached number one on the Billboard Modern Rock Tracks chart. The song "Slither" also won a Grammy Award for Best Hard Rock Performance with Vocal in 2005, an award Weiland had won previously with STP for the song "Plush" in 1994. At the 2005 Grammy Awards, Weiland (along with the rest of Velvet Revolver) performed the Beatles song "Across the Universe", along with Bono, Brian Wilson, Norah Jones, Stevie Wonder, Steven Tyler, Billie Joe Armstrong, Alison Krauss, and Alicia Keys. On July 2, 2005, Weiland and Velvet Revolver performed at Live 8 in London, in which Weiland was condemned for using strong language before the UK watershed during the performance.

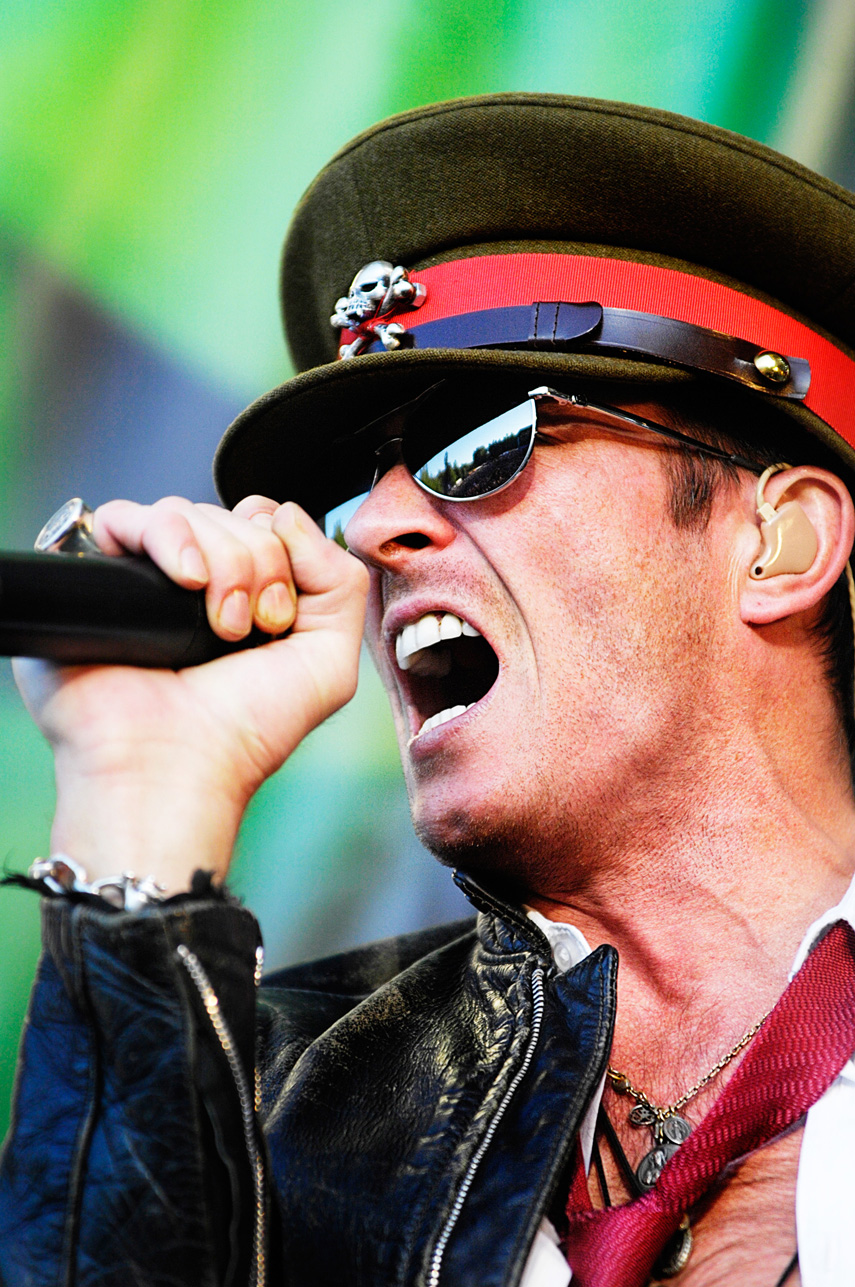
Weiland performing at Provinssirock festival in Seinäjoki, Finland, June 2007

Velvet Revolver released their second album, Libertad, on July 3, 2007, peaking at number five on the Billboard 200. The album's first single "She Builds Quick Machines" peaked at 74 on the Hot Canadian Digital Singles. The second and third singles, "The Last Fight" and "Get Out the Door", both peaked at number 16 and 34 on the Mainstream Rock Chart, respectively. Critical reception to the album was mixed. Though some critics praised the album and felt that Libertad gave the band an identity of their own, outside of the Guns N' Roses and Stone Temple Pilots comparisons, others described the album as "bland" and noted that the band seem to be "play[ing] to their strengths instead of finding a collective sound."

After several flares on their personal blogs and in interviews, it was announced on April 1, 2008 that Weiland would no longer be a member of Velvet Revolver.

Velvet Revolver reunited for a one-off performance with Weiland at a benefit concert for the late John O'Brien, on January 12, 2012.

=== Art of Anarchy ===
The project started in 2011, with guitarist Bumblefoot recording parts for the debut album in between touring with Guns N' Roses. Weiland wrote and recorded the vocals after sharing the song files back and forth with Bumblefoot from 2012 to 2013. Weiland also took part in promotional photo shoots and music videos in October 2014.

Their self-titled debut album was released in June 2015. On January 21, 2015, they released a 2:06 teaser of the new album. Bumblefoot is the producer and engineer on the album. The first single to be released from the album was "'Til the Dust Is Gone". The album contains 11 tracks. However, Weiland distanced himself from the project, stating "It was a project I did where I was just supposed to have written the lyrics and melodies, and I was paid to do it. I did some production work on it, and the next thing I knew there were press releases that I was in the band. ... I'm not in the band." In a January 2015 Rolling Stone interview, both Weiland and the Votta brothers from Anarchy stated it was a studio project that Weiland was never meant to tour with and that Anarchy would have to find a lead singer outside of the tracks Weiland had already contributed. Following Weiland's death, the lead vocalist position in Art of Anarchy was filled by former Creed vocalist Scott Stapp.

=== Solo career and the Wildabouts ===
While STP went on hiatus after the release of Tiny Music ..., Weiland released a solo album called 12 Bar Blues (1998). Weiland wrote most of the songs on the album and collaborated with several artists, notably Daniel Lanois, Sheryl Crow, Brad Mehldau, and Jeff Nolan.

On November 25, 2008, Weiland released his second solo album, "Happy" in Galoshes, produced by Weiland and songwriting-producing partner Doug Grean. Weiland went on tour in early 2009 to promote the album.

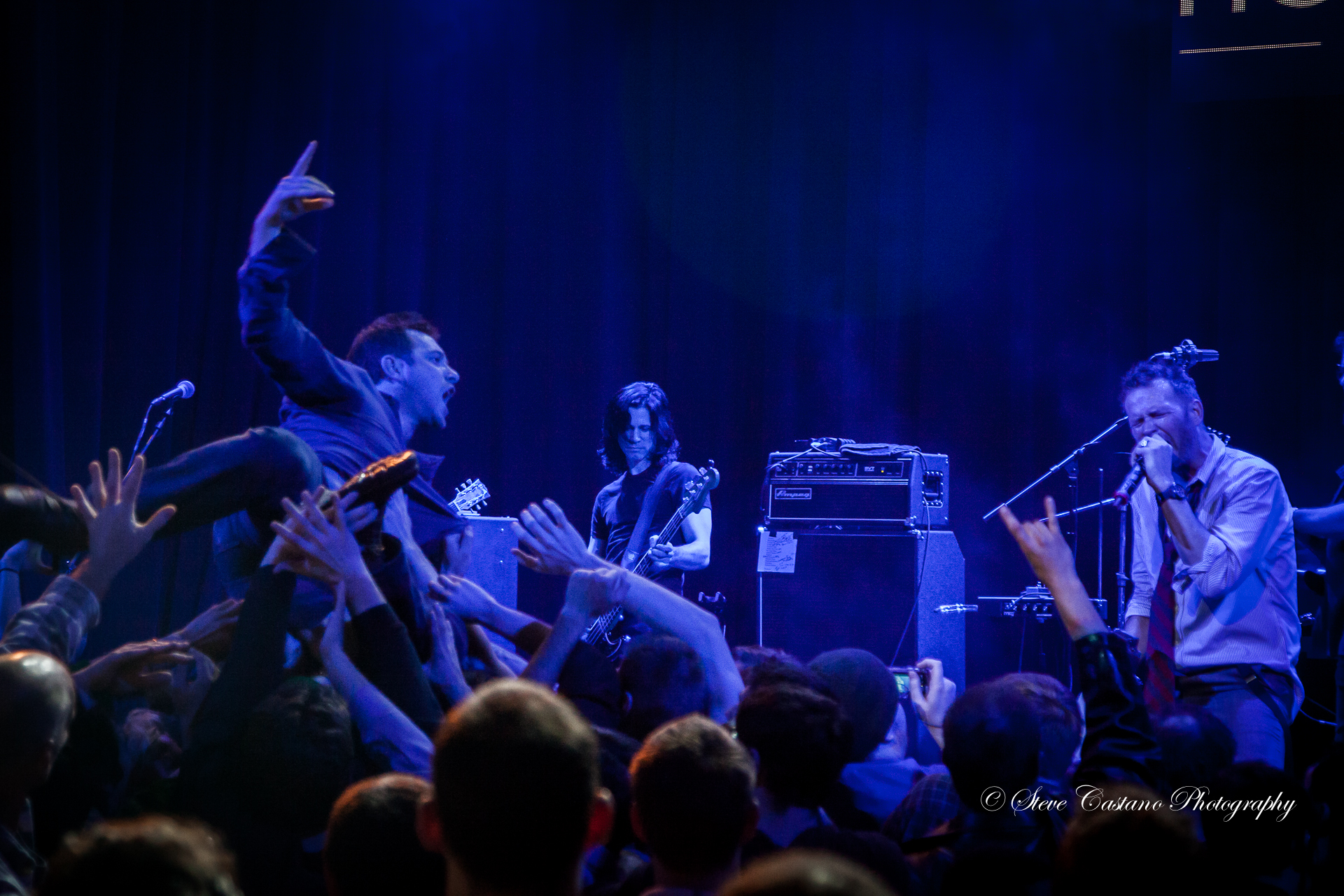
Scott Weiland and the Wildabouts perform at the Howard Theatre in Washington, D.C., on March 11, 2013, as part of the Purple at the Core Tour

On August 30, 2011, Weiland released a covers album, A Compilation of Scott Weiland Cover Songs, exclusively through his website. The album was originally to be released along with Weiland's autobiography until he decided to release it separately, stating, "[It] actually turned out so well that we're going to release a single and put it out on its own, 'cause I think it's ... it's sort of my Pin Ups, I guess you'd say."

On October 4, 2011, Weiland released The Most Wonderful Time of the Year, an album consisting entirely of Christmas music. Weiland supported the album with a US club tour. Two promotional recordings were taken from the album, cover versions of "Winter Wonderland" and "I'll Be Home for Christmas" with their respective music videos.

Scott Weiland and the Wildabouts' Purple at the Core tour commenced in March 2013 with pop/rock band MIGGS as the opening act.

In an interview with San Diego radio station KBZT in June 2014, Weiland stated that his debut album with the Wildabouts, titled Blaster, would be released in November that year. However, it was pushed back and eventually released on March 31, 2015. Guitarist Jeremy Brown died the day before the album's release. The cause of death was determined to be multiple drug intoxication, with coronary atherosclerosis and cardiomegaly being significant contributing factors. Nick Maybury replaced Brown in April 2015.

A posthumous live album titled Scott Weiland: Live featuring tracks recording during Weiland's 2009 solo tour was released on October 23, 2026. The album had initially been released on vinyl on Record Store Day 2026.

== Business ventures ==
In 2006, Weiland launched his own record label, Softdrive Records, with his songwriting partner Doug Grean. Later, Weiland announced that his label signed the up-and-coming rock band Something to Burn.

On December 19, 2008, Weiland signed a publishing deal with Bug Music, allowing Weiland to "receive funding to pursue the development of creative projects and writers for Bug Music through his co-founded label, Softdrive Records." The deal included Weiland's share of the Stone Temple Pilots catalog and any solo work produced thereafter.

On January 21, 2009, Weiland announced the launch of his clothing line, Weiland for English Laundry, in partnership with designer Christopher Wicks.

== Artistry ==
Weiland's vocal and musical style proved to be versatile, evolving constantly throughout his career. At the peak of Stone Temple Pilots' success in the early to mid-1990s, Weiland displayed a deep, baritone vocal style that was compared to that of Pearl Jam singer Eddie Vedder. However, as STP continued to branch out throughout its career, so did Weiland's vocal style. The band's third album, Tiny Music... Songs from the Vatican Gift Shop, had Weiland singing in a much higher, raspier tone to complement the band's more 60's rock-influenced sound. Later albums showcased Weiland's influences ranging from bossa nova on Shangri-La Dee Da to blues rock and classic rock on the band's 2010 self-titled album.

I just thought he was a great singer, and he'd always been on my mind for [Velvet Revolver]. He was the one vocalist that I knew had the kind of voice that would serve what we were going to do: he had a John Lennon-ish quality, a little bit of Jim Morrison, and a touch of almost David Bowie. He was the best singer to come out in a long time in my opinion.

— Slash on Scott Weiland

Weiland's first solo record, 12 Bar Blues (1998), represented a huge shift in Weiland's style, as the album featured a sound "rooted in glam rock, filtered through psychedelia and trip-hop". With Velvet Revolver, Weiland's vocals ranged from his classic baritone to a rawer style to complement the band's hard rock sound. A New York Post review of Velvet Revolver's 2007 album Libertad commented that "Weiland's vocals are crisp and controlled, yet passionate."

Weiland's second solo album, 2008's "Happy" in Galoshes, featured a wide variety of musical genres, such as bossa nova, country, neo-psychedelia and indie rock. Weiland's 2011 solo effort, the Christmas album The Most Wonderful Time of the Year consisted entirely of Christmas music in a crooning style similar to that of David Bowie and Frank Sinatra, as well as some reggae and bossa nova.

== Personal life ==
=== Relationships and family ===
Weiland married Janina Castaneda on September 17, 1994, and they divorced in 2000. He married Mary Forsberg on May 20, 2000, and they had a son named Noah (born 2000) and a daughter named Lucy (born 2002) before divorcing in 2007.

In 2005, Weiland and his son Noah were featured on comedian David Spade's The Showbiz Show with David Spade during a comedy sketch about discouraging music file sharing. Noah has a line during the sketch in which he tells a little girl, "Please buy my daddy's album so I can have food to eat."

Mary Forsberg's autobiography Fall to Pieces was co-written with Larkin Warren and released in 2009. Weiland's autobiography Not Dead & Not for Sale was co-written with David Ritz and released May 17, 2011.

In a November 2012 interview with Rolling Stone, Weiland revealed that he was engaged to Jamie Wachtel, whom he met during the 2011 filming of his music video for "I'll Be Home for Christmas". They married at their Los Angeles home on June 22, 2013.

In late 2020, Weiland's son Noah Weiland debuted his new band Suspect208, which also featured Slash's son London on drums and Robert Trujillo's son Tye on bass. Their debut song "Long Awaited" was described by Wall of Sound as being reminiscent of Purple-era Stone Temple Pilots. In early 2021, Noah was fired from the band for drug use, and the rest of the band dissolved by May of the same year.

=== Substance use and health problems ===
In 1995, Weiland was convicted of buying crack cocaine and sentenced to one year of probation. His drug use did not end after his sentence but rather increased, and he moved into a hotel room for two months; in the room next door was Courtney Love, and the pair "shot drugs the whole time" together.

Weiland revealed in 2001 that he was diagnosed with bipolar disorder.

In a 2005 interview with Esquire, Weiland said that while performing in his first bands as a teenager, his drinking "escalated" and he began using cocaine for the first time, which he referred to as a "sexual" experience. In December 2007, he was arrested and charged with driving under the influence, his first arrest in over four years. On February 7, 2008, he checked into rehab and left in early March.

Weiland's younger brother Michael died of cardiomyopathy in early 2007. The Velvet Revolver songs "For a Brother" and "Pills, Demons, & Etc" from the album Libertad are about him. Weiland said in an interview with MTV News in November 2008 that several songs on "Happy" in Galoshes were inspired by the death of his brother and his separation from Mary Forsberg. In the same article, MTV News reported that Weiland had not done heroin since December 5, 2002. Weiland admitted that he went through a "very short" cocaine binge in late 2007.

In April 2015, online footage from a concert raised questions about Weiland's health, as he appeared unsteady and was singing markedly out of tune and in a slurred voice. A representative for Weiland asserted that lack of sleep, several drinks and a faulty earpiece were to blame, not drugs. In June 2015, Weiland claimed that he had been off drugs for 13 years. His response was directed towards comments made by Filter's frontman Richard Patrick, who claimed Weiland was using drugs and that his fans were pushing him closer to death by "sticking up for" him.

After Weiland's death, the Wildabouts' tour manager Aaron Mohler said, "A lot of times I've seen Scott do coke so he could drink more."

Shortly after his death, Weiland's widow Jamie acknowledged that her husband was drinking heavily before he left on his band's last tour, but that he promised her that he would "get it together". She accompanied him on the tour for a week in November and said that he was "just killing it" onstage and "taking it up a notch" every night.

Weiland had hepatitis C, which he may have acquired from intravenous drug use.

== Death ==
Weiland was found dead on his tour bus in Bloomington, Minnesota, on December 3, 2015. He was 48 years old and had been on tour with the Wildabouts. The band's scheduled gig that evening in nearby Medina had been cancelled several days earlier, though they were still planning to play the next night in Rochester. Police searched the tour bus and confirmed there were small amounts of cocaine in the bedroom where Weiland was discovered dead.

Police also found prescription drugs, including Xanax, Buprenorphine, Ziprasidone, Viagra, and hypnotics on the tour bus. Additionally, two bags of cocaine and a bag of marijuana were found. Tommy Black, bassist for the Wildabouts, was arrested on suspicion of possession of cocaine, although the charges against him were later dropped.

Despite the discovery of drugs, no underlying cause of death was immediately given. The medical examiner later determined Weiland's death was the result of an accidental overdose of cocaine, alcohol, and methylenedioxyamphetamine (MDA). In its report, the examiner's office also noted Weiland's atherosclerotic cardiovascular disease, history of asthma, and prolonged substance abuse. However, in a 2024 interview, Wachtel disputed Weiland's cause of death as being an overdose, instead stating that it was due to the failure of his heart from years of drug and alcohol addiction.

News of Weiland's death quickly spread throughout the Internet, with many of his musical peers, including his former band members, along with fans and music critics throughout the world, sharing their condolences, tributes, and memories. A day following his death, his former bandmates in Stone Temple Pilots issued a statement saying that he was "gifted beyond words" but acknowledging his struggle with substance abuse, calling it "part of [his] curse."

A private funeral for Weiland was held at Hollywood Forever Cemetery on December 10, 2015, in Los Angeles. Members of both Stone Temple Pilots and Velvet Revolver attended. Mary Forsberg and their two children were not in attendance, later having a private ceremony in honor of Weiland.

== Legacy ==
In the wake of Weiland's death, many critics and peers offered re-evaluations of Weiland's life and career, including David Fricke of Rolling Stone. Several other artists paid tribute to the singer by covering Stone Temple Pilots tunes in concert, including Life of Agony, Saint Asonia, Umphrey's McGee, Candlebox, Halestorm, and Pop Evil, among others, while Chris Cornell dedicated a performance of "Say Hello 2 Heaven" by Temple of the Dog to the singer.

On the Smashing Pumpkins' website, Billy Corgan praised Weiland, saying: "It was STP's third album (Tiny Music... Songs from the Vatican Gift Shop), that had got me hooked, a wizardly mix of glam and post-punk, and I confessed to Scott, as well as the band many times, how wrong I'd been in assessing their native brilliance. And like Bowie can and does, it was Scott's phrasing that pushed his music into a unique, and hard to pin down, aesthetic sonicsphere. Lastly, I'd like to share a thought which, though clumsy, I hope would please Scott In Hominum. And that is if you asked me who I truly believed were the great voices of our generation, I'd say it were he, Layne, and Kurt."

In 2018, Guns N' Roses with Slash and Duff, honored Weiland during the Not in This Lifetime... Tour by covering the Velvet Revolver hit song "Slither". The band has continued to regularly cover the song live ever since.

On December 3, 2025, the tenth anniversary of Weiland's death, his son Noah held a tribute show to celebrate his father at the Garden Amp in Orange County, California. Jakob Nowell, singer for Sublime and who also lost his father Bradley Nowell when he was a baby, also performed at the event. "My old therapist gave me the idea to throw a party, get-together for my father," Noah said in an interview. "I didn't even realize it was about to be 10 years until he brought it up. My brain started cooking ideas up instantly. I'm keeping [the setlist a] surprise. Just expect hits from different eras and even some deep cuts, underrated songs. I'll definitely do a solo song or two of my own tunes, but they will be more rock and grunge based to fit the vibe of the show."

== Discography ==
=== Solo ===
==== Studio albums ====
Title	Details	Peak chart positions		
Title	Details	US	US Rock	NZ
12 Bar Blues	Released: March 31, 1998; Label: Atlantic; Format: LP, CD	42	—	47
"Happy" in Galoshes	Released: November 25, 2008; Label: Softdrive; Format: LP, CD, streaming	97	25	—
The Most Wonderful Time of the Year	Released: October 4, 2011; Label: Softdrive, Atco; Format: LP, CD, streaming	—	—	—
Blaster (as Scott Weiland and the Wildabouts)	Released: March 31, 2015; Label: Softdrive; Format: LP, CD, streaming	133	24	—

==== Cover albums ====
- A Compilation of Scott Weiland Cover Songs (2011)

==== Live albums ====
- Scott Weiland: Live (2026)

==== Charted singles ====
Title	Year	Peak chart positions	Album
Title	Year	US Alt	Album
"Lady, Your Roof Brings Me Down"	1997	39	12 Bar Blues
"Barbarella"	1998	36	12 Bar Blues
"Missing Cleveland"	2008	28	"Happy" in Galoshes
"If I Could Fly"	2025	—	Non-album single

=== with Art of Anarchy ===
- Art of Anarchy (2015)

== Bibliography ==
- Weiland, Scott (2011). Not Dead & Not for Sale: A Memoir. Scribner. ISBN 978-0743297165.
- Prato, Greg (2016). Scott Weiland: Memories of a Rock Star. Createspace. ISBN 978-1523720682.
